= C18H34O3 =

The molecular formula C_{18}H_{34}O_{3} (molar mass: 298.46 g/mol, exact mass: 298.2508 u) may refer to:

- Castor oil
- Ricinelaidic acid, or (+)-(R)-ricinelaidic acid
- Ricinoleic acid
