= PGPR =

PGPR may refer to:

- Polyglycerol polyricinoleate, emulsifier made from glycerol and fatty acids
- Plant-growth promoting rhizobacteria, heterogeneous group of bacteria from the rhizosphere, root surfaces etc.
