= Sodium ricinoleate =

Names
- Preferred IUPAC name Sodium (9Z,12R)-12-hydroxyoctadec-9-enoate
- Other names Ricinoleic acid sodium salt

Identifiers
CAS Number	5323-95-5
3D model (JSmol)	Interactive image
ChemSpider	17215848
ECHA InfoCard	100.023.811
EC Number	226-191-2
PubChem CID	23687338
RTECS number	VJ3500000
UNII	OOO64813BX
CompTox Dashboard (EPA)	DTXSID9026005
- InChI: InChI=1S/C18H34O3.Na/c1-2-3-4-11-14-17(19)15-12-9-7-5-6-8-10-13-16-18(20)21;/h9,12,17,19H,2-8,10-11,13-16H2,1H3,(H,20,21);/q;+1/p-1/b12-9-;/t17-;/m1./s1 Key: IJRHDFLHUATAOS-DPMBMXLASA-M
- SMILES: O[C@H](CCCCCC)C/C=C\CCCCCCCC([O-])=O.[Na+]

Properties
Chemical formula	C_{18}H_{33}NaO_{3}
Molar mass	320.449 g·mol^{−1}
Appearance	Pale white solid
- Except where otherwise noted, data are given for materials in their standard state (at 25 °C [77 °F], 100 kPa). Infobox references

Sodium ricinoleate is the sodium salt of ricinoleic acid, the principal fatty acid derived from castor oil. It is used in making soap, where its molecular structure causes it to lather more easily than comparable sodium soaps derived from fatty acids. It is a bactericide. It exhibits several polymorphic structural phases.

As a surfactant, sodium ricinoleate is an irritant to human skin and mucous membranes, causing hypersensitivity responses. These are due to castor bean constituents, which can be removed in order to prepare it as a food-grade ingredient.

Sodium ricinoleate was a constituent in toothpaste and was the 'SR' of Gibbs SR toothpaste, the first product to be advertised on British TV (in 1955).

== Citations ==
- Dunn, Kevin M. (2010). Scientific Soapmaking: The Chemistry of the Cold Process. Clavicula Press. ISBN 9781935652090.
- Seeley, Sam F. (September 1932). "Sodium Ricinoleate: Its Possible Value in the Prevention and Treatment of Peritonitis". Annals of Surgery. 96 (3): 350–8. doi:10.1097/00000658-193209000-00004. PMC 1391690. PMID 17866830.
- Burdock, GA; Carabin, IG; Griffiths, JC (Oct 2006). "Toxicology and pharmacology of sodium ricinoleate". Food and Chemical Toxicology. 44 (10): 1689–98. doi:10.1016/j.fct.2006.05.007. PMID 16831502.
- Narayana, K.S.; Shindeab, Neeta; Tiddy, Gordon J. T.; Holmes, Michael C. (1994). "The thermotropic liquid crystals formed by anhydrous sodium ricinoleate". Liquid Crystals. 17 (5): 617–28. doi:10.1080/02678299408037333.
