= Kusche =

Kusche is a German surname. Notable people with the surname include:

- August Kusche (1869 – 1934), German botanist and entomologist
- Benno Kusche (1916–2010), German operatic baritone
- Emily Kusche (born 2002), German actress
- Larry Kusche (1940–2024), American author, research librarian and pilot
- Maria Kusche (1928–2012), Spanish art historian of German descent
