= Scotorythra macrosoma =

Scientific classification
- Kingdom: Animalia
- Phylum: Arthropoda
- Clade: Pancrustacea
- Class: Insecta
- Order: Lepidoptera
- Family: Geometridae
- Genus: Scotorythra
- Species: S. macrosoma

Binomial name
- Scotorythra macrosoma Meyrick, 1899

Species of moth

Scotorythra macrosoma is a species of moth in the family Geometridae. It was first described by Edward Meyrick in 1899 and is endemic to the Hawaiian islands of Kauai, Molokai, Maui, and Hawaii.

Larvae have been reared from leaves of Ricinus species.
