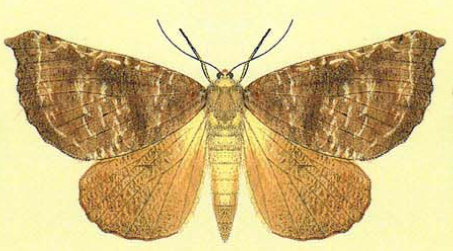
- Extinct Scotorythra megalophylla (female)

Scientific classification
- Kingdom: Animalia
- Phylum: Arthropoda
- Class: Insecta
- Order: Lepidoptera
- Family: Geometridae
- Tribe: Boarmiini
- Genus: Scotorythra; Butler, 1883

Synonyms
- Sisyrophyta Meyrick, 1899; Nesochlide Perkins, 1901; Acrodrepanis Perkins, 1901

= Scotorythra =

Genus of moths

Scotorythra is a genus of moths in the family Geometridae erected by Arthur Gardiner Butler in 1883. All species of this genus are endemic to Hawaii.

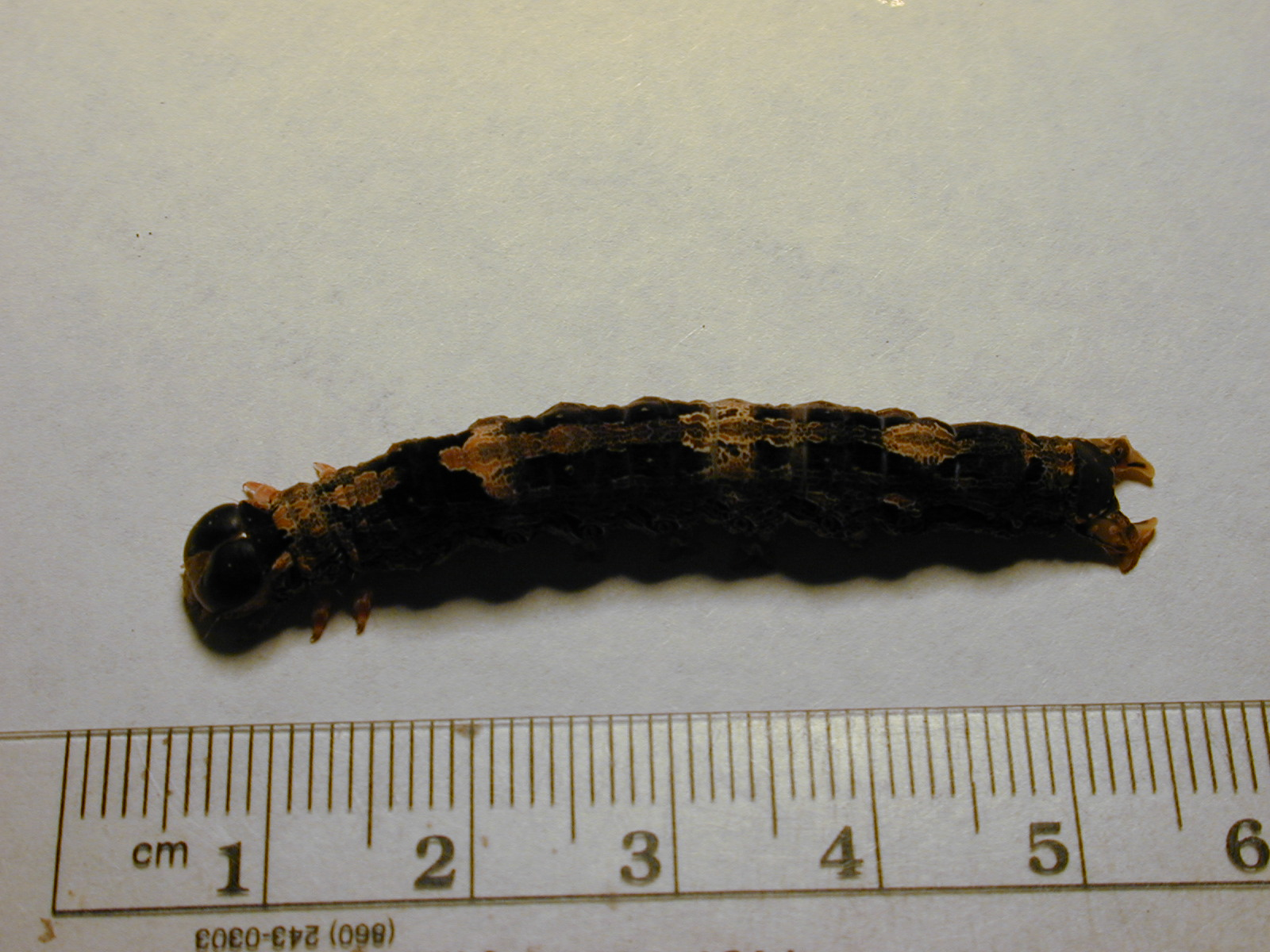
Caterpillar of a Scotorythra species

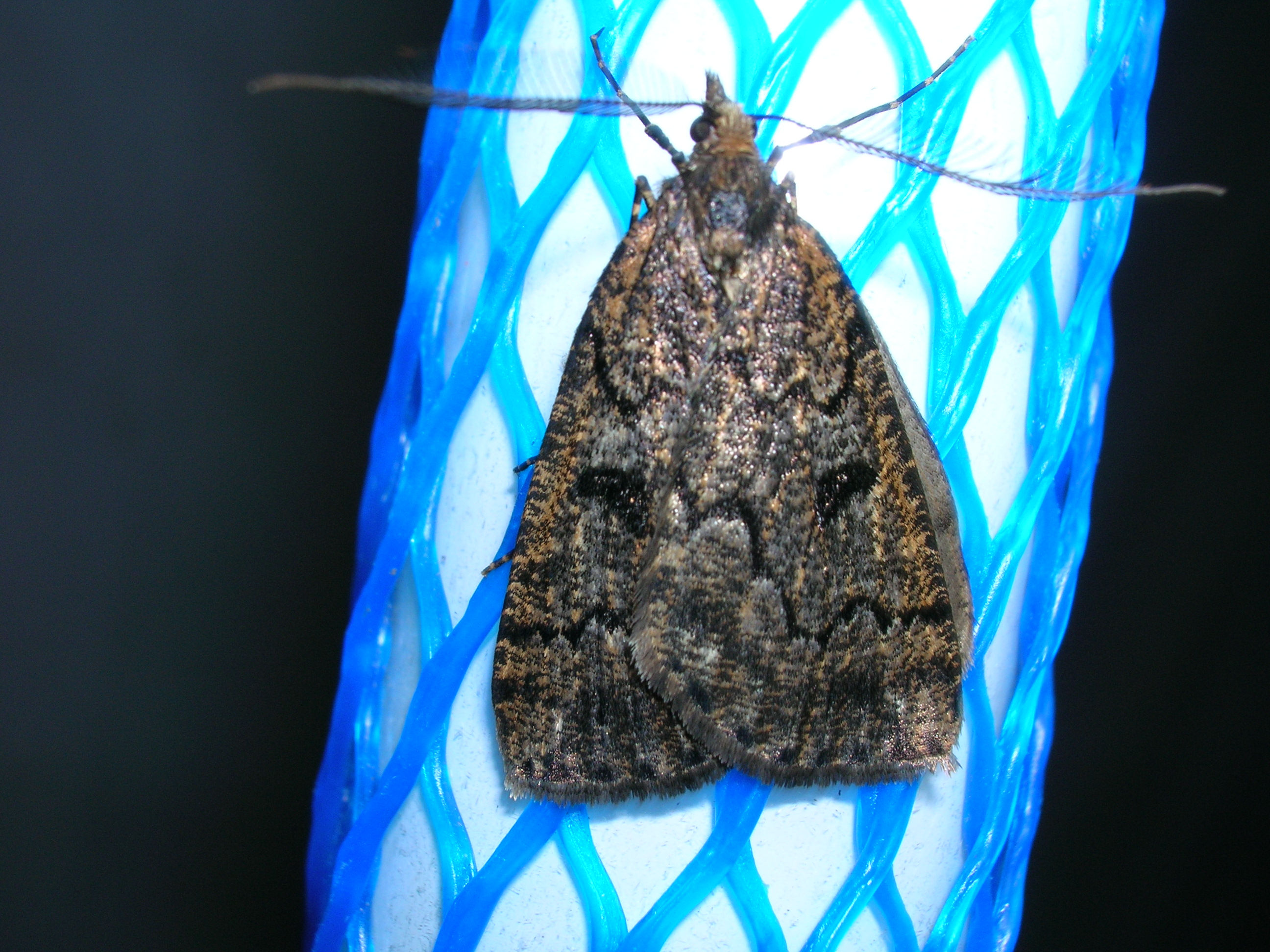

== Species ==
- Scotorythra anagraptis Meyrick, 1899
- Scotorythra apicalis Swezey, 1948
- Scotorythra arboricolans Butler, 1883
- Scotorythra artemidora Meyrick, 1899
- Scotorythra brunnea (Warren, 1896)
- Scotorythra capnopa Meyrick, 1899
- Scotorythra caryopis Meyrick, 1899
- Scotorythra corticea (Butler, 1881)
- Scotorythra crocorrhoa Meyrick, 1928
- Scotorythra demetrias Meyrick, 1899
- Scotorythra diceraunia Meyrick, 1900
- Scotorythra dissotis Meyrick, 1904
- Scotorythra epicyma Meyrick, 1899
- Scotorythra epixantha (Perkins, 1901)
- Scotorythra euryphaea Meyrick, 1899
- Scotorythra gomphias (Meyrick, 1899)
- Scotorythra goniastis Meyrick, 1899
- Scotorythra hecataea Meyrick, 1899
- Scotorythra hyparcha Meyrick, 1899
- Scotorythra kuschei Swezey, 1940
- Scotorythra leptias Meyrick, 1904
- Scotorythra macrosoma Meyrick, 1899
- Scotorythra megalophylla Meyrick, 1899
- Scotorythra metacrossa Meyrick, 1904
- Scotorythra nephelosticta Meyrick, 1899
- Scotorythra nesiotes (Perkins, 1901)
- Scotorythra ochetias (Meyrick, 1899)
- Scotorythra ortharcha Meyrick, 1899
- Scotorythra oxyphractis Meyrick, 1899
- Scotorythra pachyspila Meyrick, 1899
- Scotorythra paludicola (Butler, 1879)
- Scotorythra paratactis Meyrick, 1904
- Scotorythra platycapna Meyrick, 1899
- Scotorythra rara (Butler, 1879)
- Scotorythra trachyopis Meyrick, 1899
- Scotorythra trapezias Meyrick, 1899
- Scotorythra triscia Meyrick, 1899

The following species are believed to be extinct:

- Kona giant looper moth (Scotorythra megalophylla)
- Koʻolau giant looper moth (Scotorythra nesiotes)
- Hawaiian hopseed looper moth (Scotorythra paratactis)
