= Hawaiian hopseed looper moth =

Conservation status
- Data Deficient (IUCN 3.1)

Scientific classification
- Kingdom: Animalia
- Phylum: Arthropoda
- Class: Insecta
- Order: Lepidoptera
- Family: Geometridae
- Genus: Scotorythra
- Species: S. paratactis

Binomial name
- Scotorythra paratactis Meyrick, 1904

Species of moth

The Hawaiian hopseed looper moth (Scotorythra paratactis) is a species of moth in the family Geometridae. It is endemic to the island of Oahu in Hawaii.

The larvae feed on Dodonaea viscosa.
