= Scotorythra caryopis =

Scientific classification
- Kingdom: Animalia
- Phylum: Arthropoda
- Class: Insecta
- Order: Lepidoptera
- Family: Geometridae
- Genus: Scotorythra
- Species: S. caryopis

Binomial name
- Scotorythra caryopis Meyrick, 1899

Synonyms
- Scotorythra isopora Meyrick, 1899

Species of moth

Scotorythra caryopis is a moth of the family Geometridae. It was first described by Edward Meyrick in 1899. It is endemic to the Hawaiian islands of Kauai and Oahu.

The larvae feed on Acacia koa.
