= Scotorythra hyparcha =

Scientific classification
- Kingdom: Animalia
- Phylum: Arthropoda
- Class: Insecta
- Order: Lepidoptera
- Family: Geometridae
- Genus: Scotorythra
- Species: S. hyparcha

Binomial name
- Scotorythra hyparcha Meyrick, 1899

Species of moth

Scotorythra hyparcha is a moth of the family Geometridae. It was first described by Edward Meyrick in 1899. It is endemic to the island of Hawaii. Its larvae probably feed on Metrosideros species.
