= Zinc ricinoleate =

Names
- IUPAC name Zinc bis[(9Z,12R)-12-hydroxy-9-octadecenoate]

Identifiers
CAS Number	13040-19-2
3D model (JSmol)	Interactive image
ChemSpider	4942331
ECHA InfoCard	100.032.632
PubChem CID	6437808
UNII	BOH1Z111J2
CompTox Dashboard (EPA)	DTXSID30891887
- InChI: InChI=1S/2C18H34O3.Zn/c2*1-2-3-4-11-14-17(19)15-12-9-7-5-6-8-10-13-16-18(20)21;/h2*9,12,17,19H,2-8,10-11,13-16H2,1H3,(H,20,21);/q;;+2/p-2/b2*12-9-;/t2*17-;/m11./s1 Key: GAWWVVGZMLGEIW-GNNYBVKZSA-L; InChI=1/2C18H34O3.Zn/c2*1-2-3-4-11-14-17(19)15-12-9-7-5-6-8-10-13-16-18(20)21;/h2*9,12,17,19H,2-8,10-11,13-16H2,1H3,(H,20,21);/q;;+2/p-2/b2*12-9-;/t2*17-;/m11./s1 Key: GAWWVVGZMLGEIW-AHLWSCBLBS
- SMILES: CCCCCC[C@@H](O)C/C=C\CCCCCCCC(=O)[O-].CCCCCC[C@@H](O)C/C=C\CCCCCCCC(=O)[O-].[Zn+2]

Properties
Chemical formula	C_{36}H_{66}O_{6}Zn
Molar mass	660.315
- Except where otherwise noted, data are given for materials in their standard state (at 25 °C [77 °F], 100 kPa). Infobox references

Zinc ricinoleate is the zinc salt of ricinoleic acid, a major fatty acid found in castor oil. It is used in many deodorants as an odor-adsorbing agent. The mechanism of this activity is unclear.

Zinc carboxylates adopt the basic zinc acetate structure but they are often depicted, like here, as salts with naked Zn^{2+} and two ionized carboxylate anions.
