= Scotorythra diceraunia =

Scientific classification
- Domain: Eukaryota
- Kingdom: Animalia
- Phylum: Arthropoda
- Class: Insecta
- Order: Lepidoptera
- Family: Geometridae
- Genus: Scotorythra
- Species: S. diceraunia

Binomial name
- Scotorythra diceraunia Meyrick, 1900

Species of moth

Scotorythra diceraunia is a moth of the family Geometridae. It was first described by Edward Meyrick in 1900. It is endemic to the Hawaiian islands of Oahu, Molokai and Maui.

Larvae have been reared from guava.
