= Scotorythra goniastis =

Scientific classification
- Kingdom: Animalia
- Phylum: Arthropoda
- Class: Insecta
- Order: Lepidoptera
- Family: Geometridae
- Genus: Scotorythra
- Species: S. goniastis

Binomial name
- Scotorythra goniastis Meyrick, 1899

Species of moth

Scotorythra goniastis is a moth of the family Geometridae first described by Edward Meyrick in 1899. It is endemic to the Hawaiian islands of Maui and Hawaii.
