= Scotorythra euryphaea =

Scientific classification
- Domain: Eukaryota
- Kingdom: Animalia
- Phylum: Arthropoda
- Class: Insecta
- Order: Lepidoptera
- Family: Geometridae
- Genus: Scotorythra
- Species: S. euryphaea

Binomial name
- Scotorythra euryphaea Meyrick, 1899

Species of moth

Scotorythra euryphaea is a moth of the family Geometridae. It was first described by Edward Meyrick in 1899. It is endemic to the Hawaiian islands of Kauai, Oahu, Molokai and Maui.

The larvae probably feed on Metrosideros species.
