= Scotorythra apicalis =

Scientific classification
- Domain: Eukaryota
- Kingdom: Animalia
- Phylum: Arthropoda
- Class: Insecta
- Order: Lepidoptera
- Family: Geometridae
- Genus: Scotorythra
- Species: S. apicalis

Binomial name
- Scotorythra apicalis Swezey, 1948

Species of moth

Scotorythra apicalis is a moth of the family Geometridae. It was first described by Otto Herman Swezey in 1948. It is endemic to the island of Hawaii.
