= Scotorythra pachyspila =

Scientific classification
- Kingdom: Animalia
- Phylum: Arthropoda
- Class: Insecta
- Order: Lepidoptera
- Family: Geometridae
- Genus: Scotorythra
- Species: S. pachyspila

Binomial name
- Scotorythra pachyspila Meyrick, 1899

Species of moth

Scotorythra pachyspila is a moth of the family Geometridae. It was first described by Edward Meyrick in 1899. It is endemic to the Hawaiian islands of Kauai, Oahu, Maui, Lanai and Hawaii

The larvae feed on Metrosideros species.
