= Erigeron kuschei =

Conservation status
- Critically Imperiled (NatureServe)

Scientific classification
- Kingdom: Plantae
- Clade: Tracheophytes
- Clade: Angiosperms
- Clade: Eudicots
- Clade: Asterids
- Order: Asterales
- Family: Asteraceae
- Genus: Erigeron
- Species: E. kuschei

Binomial name
- Erigeron kuschei Eastw.

Species of flowering plant

Erigeron kuschei is a rare species of flowering plant in the family Asteraceae known by the common name Chiricahua fleabane. It is endemic to Arizona in the southwestern United States, where it is known from two locations in the Chiricahua Mountains.

Erigeron kuschei is a rhizomatous perennial herb produces hairy stems a few centimeters tall. The leaves are spatula-shaped to lance-shaped and up to 6 cm (2.4 in) long near the base of the plant. The flower heads are lined with hairy, glandular phyllaries and contain many white ray florets each up to 1.1 cm (0.43 in) long surrounding numerous yellow disc florets.

This plant grows in shady spots on north-facing cliffs and outcrops, often in mossy spots among conifers.

The species is named for botanist J. August Kusche.
