= Alex Macintosh =

British television personality (1925–1997)

Alex Macintosh (18 November 1925 – 7 September 1997) was a BBC presenter and continuity announcer from the mid-1950s to the mid-1970s. He was also the voice artist heard during the first British-broadcast advertisement, for Gibbs SR Toothpaste on ITV, 22 September 1955.

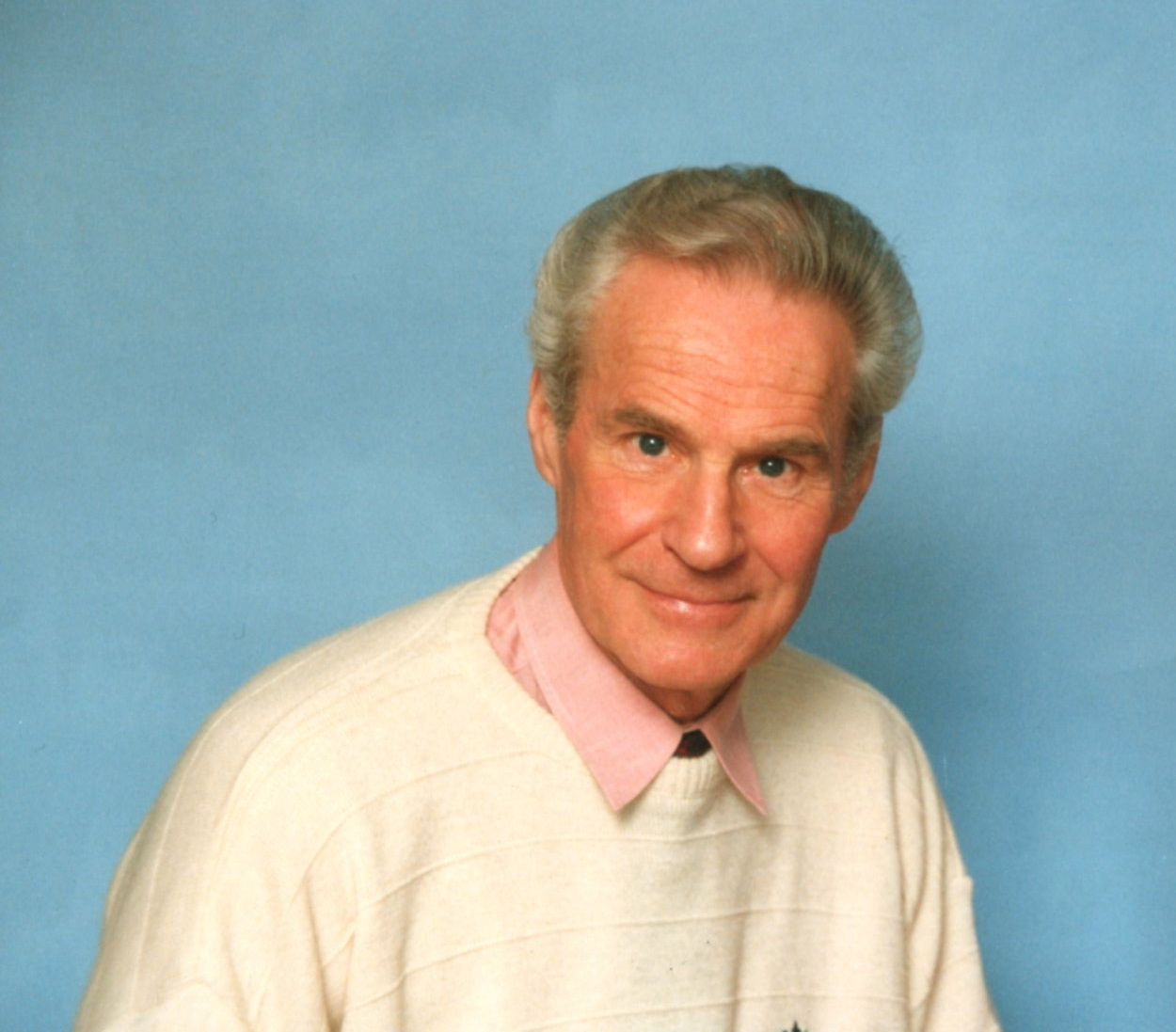
Alex Macintosh

== Career ==
Macintosh was a BBC TV in-vision announcer from 1955 to 1961, which led to him becoming a presenter on other BBC programmes.

Other work included a spell as a regional presenter on Come Dancing (between 1957 and 1966; and again 1968–1972). In 1962, he guest-starred in an episode of Brian Rix's Dial RIX as a host of "Come Prancing."

In 1957 he played a TV Interviewer in There's Always a Thursday.

In addition to BBC work, Macintosh's voice was heard on the very first advert for Gibbs SR Toothpaste that was shown at 8.12pm on the opening night of ITV on 22 September 1955.

In 1961, he presented the London area news magazine Town and Around, and was a relief news reader in March 1961.

In 1962, he played the part of Paul Kay, newspaper reporter, in Dead Man's Evidence.

Macintosh also took many supporting roles in a variety of TV programmes, often as a TV reporter, interviewer or newsreader, in which guise he appeared in episodes of R3 (1965), The Troubleshooters (1969) and Doctor Who (Day of the Daleks) (1972).

== Later life ==
After a considerable stint with the BBC, Macintosh worked for an Australian TV company in Sydney, before retiring to Norfolk where he pursued an interest in portrait painting.

== Quotes ==
"The tingling fresh toothpaste that does your gums good, too. It's tingling fresh. It's fresh as ice. It's Gibbs SR toothpaste."
