= Scotorythra epixantha =

Scientific classification
- Domain: Eukaryota
- Kingdom: Animalia
- Phylum: Arthropoda
- Class: Insecta
- Order: Lepidoptera
- Family: Geometridae
- Genus: Scotorythra
- Species: S. epixantha

Binomial name
- Scotorythra epixantha (Perkins, 1901)

Synonyms
- Nesochlide epixantha Perkins, 1901

Species of moth

Scotorythra epixantha is a moth of the family Geometridae. It was described by Perkins in 1901. It is endemic to the Hawaiian island of Oahu.
