= Scotorythra ortharcha =

Scientific classification
- Domain: Eukaryota
- Kingdom: Animalia
- Phylum: Arthropoda
- Class: Insecta
- Order: Lepidoptera
- Family: Geometridae
- Genus: Scotorythra
- Species: S. ortharcha

Binomial name
- Scotorythra ortharcha Meyrick, 1899

Species of moth

Scotorythra ortharcha is a moth of the family Geometridae. It was first described by Edward Meyrick in 1899. It is endemic to the island of Hawaii.
