= Scotorythra nesiotes =

Koʻolau giant looper moth

Conservation status
- Extinct (IUCN 2.3)

Scientific classification
- Kingdom: Animalia
- Phylum: Arthropoda
- Class: Insecta
- Order: Lepidoptera
- Family: Geometridae
- Genus: Scotorythra
- Species: †S. nesiotes

Binomial name
- †Scotorythra nesiotes (Perkins, 1901)

Synonyms
- Acrodrepanis nesiotes Perkins, 1901

Species of moth

Scotorythra nesiotes, the Koʻolau giant looper moth, was a moth in the family Geometridae. The species was described by Perkins in 1901. It was endemic to Oʻahu, the Hawaiian Islands.

It had a wingspan of about 49 mm.
