= Scotorythra kuschei =

Scientific classification
- Domain: Eukaryota
- Kingdom: Animalia
- Phylum: Arthropoda
- Class: Insecta
- Order: Lepidoptera
- Family: Geometridae
- Genus: Scotorythra
- Species: S. kuschei

Binomial name
- Scotorythra kuschei Swezey, 1940

Species of moth

Scotorythra kuschei is a moth of the family Geometridae. It was first described by Otto Herman Swezey in 1940. It is endemic to the Hawaiian island of Kauai.
