= Scotorythra corticea =

Scientific classification
- Domain: Eukaryota
- Kingdom: Animalia
- Phylum: Arthropoda
- Class: Insecta
- Order: Lepidoptera
- Family: Geometridae
- Genus: Scotorythra
- Species: S. corticea

Binomial name
- Scotorythra corticea (Butler, 1881)

Synonyms
- Scotosia corticea Butler, 1881; Scotorythra aruraea Meyrick, 1899

Species of moth

Scotorythra corticea is a moth of the family Geometridae. It was first described by Arthur Gardiner Butler in 1881. It is endemic to the Hawaiian island of Maui.

The larvae feed on Acacia koa.
