= Scotorythra ochetias =

Scientific classification
- Kingdom: Animalia
- Phylum: Arthropoda
- Class: Insecta
- Order: Lepidoptera
- Family: Geometridae
- Genus: Scotorythra
- Species: S. ochetias

Binomial name
- Scotorythra ochetias (Meyrick, 1899)

Synonyms
- Sisyrophyta ochetias Meyrick, 1899

Species of moth

Scotorythra ochetias is a moth of the family Geometridae. It was first described by Edward Meyrick in 1899. It is endemic to the island of Hawaii.
