= Scotorythra trapezias =

Scientific classification
- Kingdom: Animalia
- Phylum: Arthropoda
- Class: Insecta
- Order: Lepidoptera
- Family: Geometridae
- Genus: Scotorythra
- Species: S. trapezias

Binomial name
- Scotorythra trapezias Meyrick, 1899

Species of moth

Scotorythra trapezias is a moth of the family Geometridae. It was first described by Edward Meyrick in 1899.

It is endemic to the Hawaiian islands of Kauai, Oahu, Molokai, Maui and Hawaii.

The larvae feed on Dodonaea species.
