= Scotorythra arboricolans =

Scientific classification
- Domain: Eukaryota
- Kingdom: Animalia
- Phylum: Arthropoda
- Class: Insecta
- Order: Lepidoptera
- Family: Geometridae
- Genus: Scotorythra
- Species: S. arboricolans

Binomial name
- Scotorythra arboricolans Butler, 1883

Synonyms
- Scotorythra syngonopa Meyrick, 1899; Scotorythra homotrias Meyrick, 1899

Species of moth

Scotorythra arboricolans is a moth of the family Geometridae. It was first described by Arthur Gardiner Butler in 1883. It is endemic to the Hawaiian islands of Kauai, Oahu, Molokai, Maui, Lanai and Hawaii

The larvae feed on Santalum freycinetianum, Santalum paniculatum and Santalum pyrularium.
