= Scotorythra artemidora =

Scientific classification
- Kingdom: Animalia
- Phylum: Arthropoda
- Class: Insecta
- Order: Lepidoptera
- Family: Geometridae
- Genus: Scotorythra
- Species: S. artemidora

Binomial name
- Scotorythra artemidora Meyrick, 1899

Species of moth

Scotorythra artemidora is a moth of the family Geometridae. It was first described by Edward Meyrick in 1899. It is endemic to the island of Hawaii.
