= Polyglycerol polyricinoleate =

Emulsion used in food production

Names
- IUPAC name 1,2,3-Propanetriol, homopolymer, (9Z,12R)-12-hydroxy-9-octadecenoate

Identifiers
| CAS Number | 29894-35-7 |
| ChemSpider | None |
| ECHA InfoCard | 100.117.615 |
| E number | E476 (thickeners, ...) |
| PubChem CID | 9843407 |
| UNII | DHM1T5XO11 |

Properties
| Chemical formula | (C_{3}H_{5}O_{2})_{n}(C_{18}H_{32}O_{2})_{m} |

Related compounds
| Related compounds | Triricinolein (monomer); Polyglycerol; Ricinoleic acid |
- Except where otherwise noted, data are given for materials in their standard state (at 25 °C [77 °F], 100 kPa). verify (what is ?) Infobox references

Polyglycerol polyricinoleate (PGPR), E476, is an emulsifier made from glycerol and fatty acids (usually from castor bean, but also from soybean oil). In chocolate, compound chocolate and similar coatings, PGPR is mainly used with another substance like lecithin to reduce viscosity. It is used at low levels (below 0.5%), and works by decreasing the friction between the solid particles (e.g. cacao, sugar, milk) in molten chocolate, reducing the yield stress so that it flows more easily, approaching the behaviour of a Newtonian fluid. It can also be used as an emulsifier in spreads and in salad dressings, or to improve the texture of baked goods. It is made up of a short chain of glycerol molecules connected by ether bonds, with ricinoleic acid side chains connected by ester bonds.

PGPR is a yellowish, viscous liquid, and is strongly lipophilic: it is soluble in fats and oils and insoluble in water and ethanol.

== Manufacture ==
Glycerol is heated to above 200 °C in a reactor in the presence of an alkaline catalyst to create polyglycerol. Castor oil fatty acids are separately heated to above 200 °C, to create interesterified ricinoleic fatty acids. The polyglycerol and the interesterified ricinoleic fatty acids are then mixed to create PGPR.

== Use in chocolate ==
As PGPR improves the flow characteristics of chocolate and compound chocolate, especially near the melting point, it can improve the efficiency of chocolate coating processes: chocolate coatings with PGPR flow better around shapes of enrobed and dipped products, and it also improves the performance of equipment used to produce solid molded products: the chocolate flows better into the mold, and surrounds inclusions and releases trapped air more easily. PGPR can also be used to reduce the quantity of cocoa butter needed in chocolate formulations: the solid particles in chocolate are suspended in the cocoa butter, and by reducing the viscosity of the chocolate, less cocoa butter is required, which saves costs, because cocoa butter is an expensive ingredient, and also leads to a lower-fat product.

== Safety ==
The FDA has deemed PGPR to be generally recognized as safe for human consumption, and the Joint FAO/WHO Expert Committee on Food Additives (JECFA) has also deemed it safe. Both of these organisations set the acceptable daily intake at 7.5 milligrams per kilogram of body weight. In 2017, a panel from the European Food Safety Authority recommended an increased acceptable daily intake of 25 milligrams per kilogram of body weight based on a new chronic toxicity and carcinogenicity study. In Europe, PGPR is allowed in chocolate up to a level of 0.5%.

In a 1998 review funded by Unilever of safety evaluations from the late 1950s and early 1960s, "PGPR was found to be 98% digested by rats and utilized as a source of energy superior to starch and nearly equivalent to peanut oil." Additionally, no evidence was found of interference with normal fat metabolism, nor with growth, reproduction, and maintenance of tissue. Overall, it did not "constitute a human health hazard".
