= Scotorythra gomphias =

Scientific classification
- Kingdom: Animalia
- Phylum: Arthropoda
- Class: Insecta
- Order: Lepidoptera
- Family: Geometridae
- Genus: Scotorythra
- Species: S. gomphias

Binomial name
- Scotorythra gomphias (Meyrick, 1899)

Synonyms
- Sisyrophyta gomphias Meyrick, 1899

Species of moth

Scotorythra gomphias is a moth of the family Geometridae. It was first described by Edward Meyrick in 1899. It is endemic to the Hawaiian islands of Oahu, Molokai, Maui and Hawaii.

The larvae feed on Bobea, Pisonia and Straussia species.
