= Mentadent =

Toothpaste brand of Unilever

- Unilever's Mentadent P Toothpaste in the UK
- Product type: Dental Products
- Current owner: Unilever (excluding North America); Church & Dwight (North America only)
- Introduced: 1982; 44 years ago

Mentadent is a brand name for a line of dental products manufactured by Unilever for its home and international markets excluding the United States and Canada where the company sold its rights to the brand to Church & Dwight Company in 2003.

In 2016, Church & Dwight announced it would discontinue the Mentadent brand effective Spring 2017. As it only involved the rights for US and Canadian sales, this did not affect Unilever which still markets and sells Mentadent branded products in other markets.

In 2018 it was thought that Unilever had quietly retired the Mentadent SR brand from the UK market, leaving only Mentadent P on sale. However, as of 2024, various Mentadent toothpastes were available to buy in Asda.

== History ==
Unilever first introduced the brand around 1982 with the launch of Mentadent P, Mentadent later became the key brand for Unilever toothpaste and Gibbs SR, a brand that dated back to the 1950s, was renamed Mentadent SR.

=== First UK television advert ===
Mentadent SR, formerly Gibbs SR, is one of three toothpaste products still marketed by Unilever worldwide. The product was originally named after its active ingredient, sodium ricinoleate.

Gibbs SR was the first product to be promoted on UK television. The introduction of commercial television advertising was due to the Television Act 1954 which created the commercial broadcaster ITV. The advertisement was first shown on Associated-Rediffusion in London on 22 September 1955 at 8.12pm BST, with a voiceover by Alex Macintosh. The advertisement was written and produced by Brian Palmer.

== Toothpaste ==
Unilever makes 3 varieties of toothpaste under the Mentadent brand

1. Mentadent P Toothpaste
2. Mentadent Sensitive Toothpaste
3. Mentadent SR Toothpaste (Discontinued)

== Post-2003 brand in the United States and Canada ==
In 2003, Church & Dwight Company acquired the United States and Canadian rights to the Mentadent brand from Unilever and then operated it as a subsidiary brand of Arm & Hammer until it discontinued sales of the brand in 2016.

Mentadent is most notable for its unique toothpaste dispenser: a dual chamber pump. This design is intended to keep two ingredients separated until they are dispensed. Upon brushing, the ingredients will react with each other in the user's mouth. Both the toothpaste (formula) and the design of the pump were invented and then patented by Hans Schaeffer - who later sold the patent.

In the majority of its toothpaste lines, the two separate ingredients are baking soda and peroxide. Upon brushing, baking soda and peroxide combine to release oxygen bubbles. It is claimed that these bubbles will clean, whiten, and freshen the mouth.

Varieties

- Mentadent Replenishing White
- Mentadent Advanced Whitening
- Mentadent Advanced Cleaning with Breath Freshening
- Mentadent Advanced Care
- Mentadent White System

== See also ==
- List of toothpaste brands
- Index of oral health and dental articles
