= August Kusche =

German–American entomologist (1869–1934)

John August Kusche (1869–1934) was a German–American botanist and entomologist. He discovered species of moths and butterflies, and made collections in remote South Pacific and Arctic regions, Alaska, Arizona, Hawaiian Islands, and elsewhere. He contributed many specimens to collections at North American museums. A species of the aster family, Erigeron kuschei, was named after him.

== Biography ==
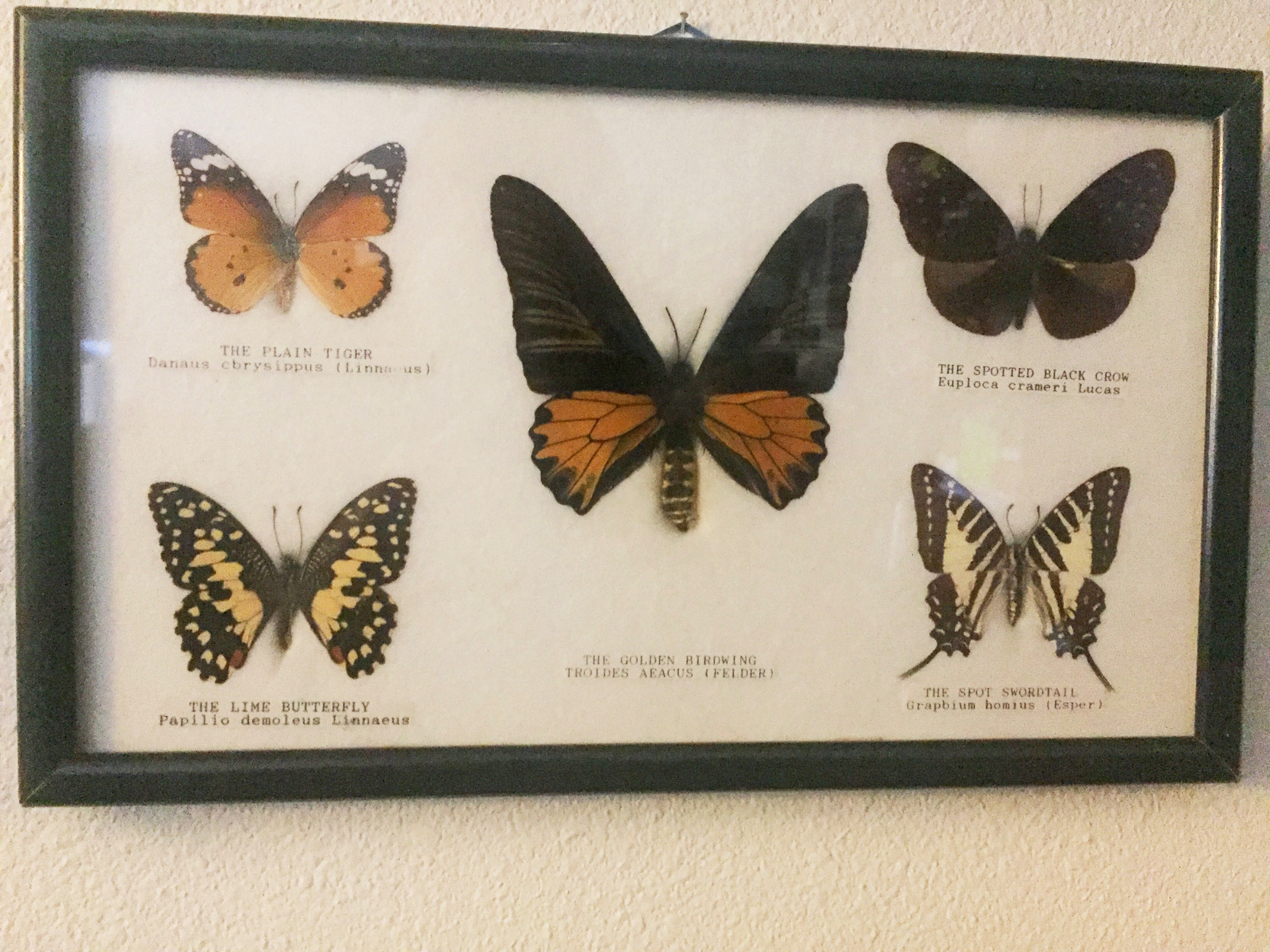
Butterflies mounted by August Kusche

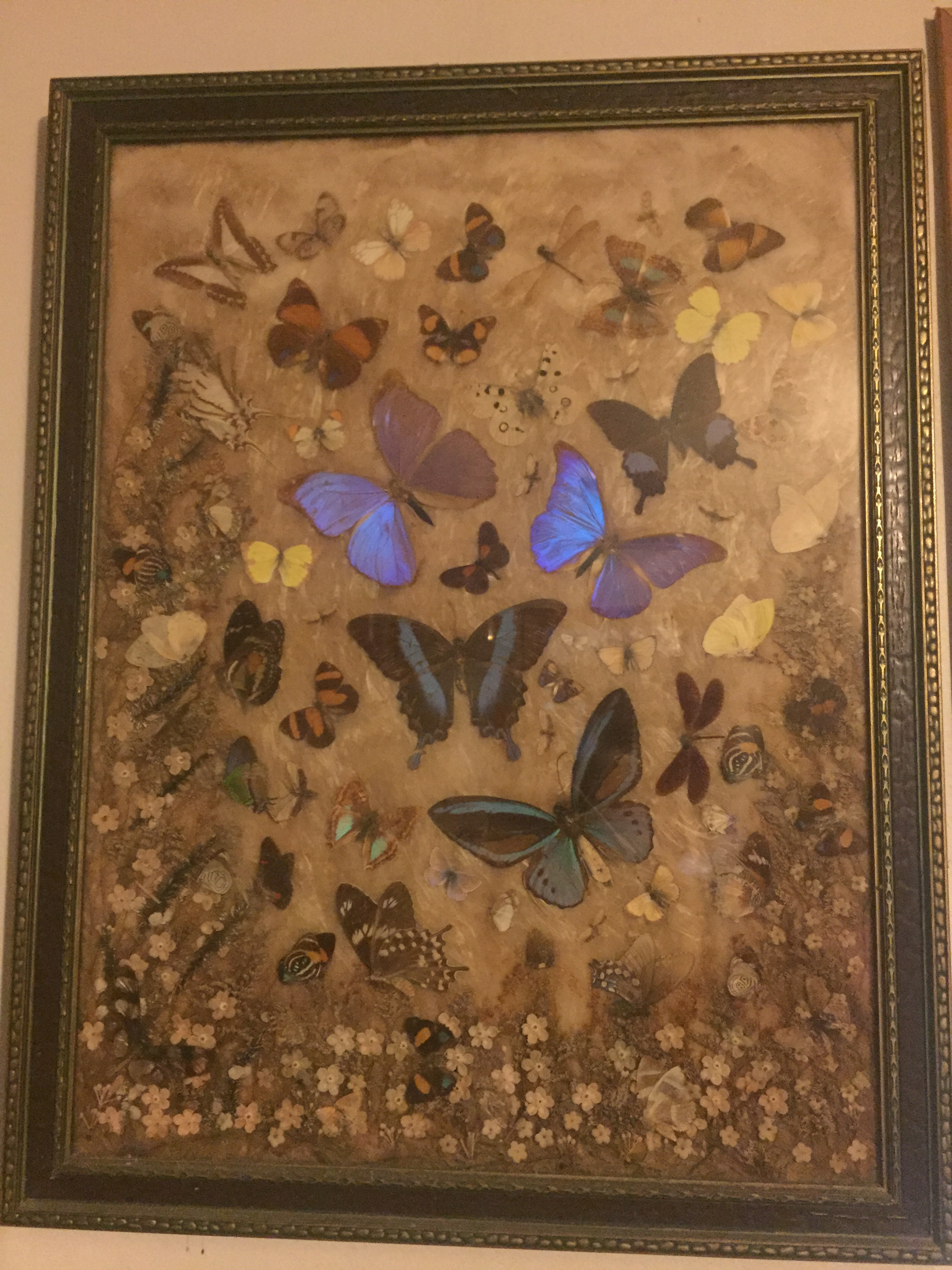
A picture made of mounted butterflies and plants created by Kusche. The inscription on the back reads "Mounted by I Aug Kusche, Nov. 2, 1926: Los Angeles Calf."

August Kusche's father, Johann Karl Wilhelm Kusche, had four children: Herman, Ernst, Pauline and August, from his first marriage. Subsequently, after the divorce from his first wife, he remarried and had six more children: Bertha, Wilhelm, Heinrich, Reinhold, and two others who died at a young age. August’s father descended from a long line of farmers who tilled the lands around Kreuzburg, Germany.

Kusche attended a gardening school in Kreuzburg but left at a young age after unintentionally setting a forest on fire. After the fire, he immigrated to the United States and corresponded with his family, encouraging them to join him.

Kusche's father relocated to Brownsville, Texas, shortly after February 1893 and established a homestead. After contracting yellow fever and recovering, his health was greatly affected, leaving him weak and unable to work. He reached out to August, who was residing in Prescott, Arizona, at the time, seeking financial assistance. August wrote back, saying "Dear father, if you are out of money, see to it that you go back to Germany as soon as possible. Without any money here, you are lost."

When August arrived in the United States, he got a job as a gardener on a Pennsylvanian farm. He had an affair with a Swiss woman named Louise Notz, and she became pregnant. August denied being the child's father, but was married to the woman soon after. He went west on horseback, but had his horse stolen by Native Americans. He ended up in San Francisco, and his family eventually joined him there. By this time, he had three sons and a daughter. After his children grew up, he began traveling and collecting moths and butterflies.

Kusche traveled to the islands of the Pacific Ocean, where he collected moths and butterflies. There, he caught a fever that nearly killed him. He was picked up by a government ship in New Guinea and was unconscious until he awoke in a hospital in San Francisco. He had hearing loss and lost all of his teeth. His doctor told him not to take any more trips to Alaska, which helped his condition. In 1924, Kusche lived in San Diego. He had taken a trip to Alaska just before this date. He worked as a gardener in California for nine years (1915–1924), where he died of stomach cancer.

== Notable discoveries ==
In 1928, Kusche donated 164 species of Lepidoptera he collected on Kauai between 1919 and 1920 to the Bishop Museum. Of those species, 55 had not previously been recorded on Kauai and 6 were newly discovered, namely Agrotis stenospila, Euxoa charmocrita, Plusia violacea, Nesamiptis senicula, Nesamiptis proterortha, and Scotorythra crocorrhoa.

The Essig Museum of Entomology listed 26 species collected by Kusche from California, Arizona, Alaska, and the Solomon Islands.
