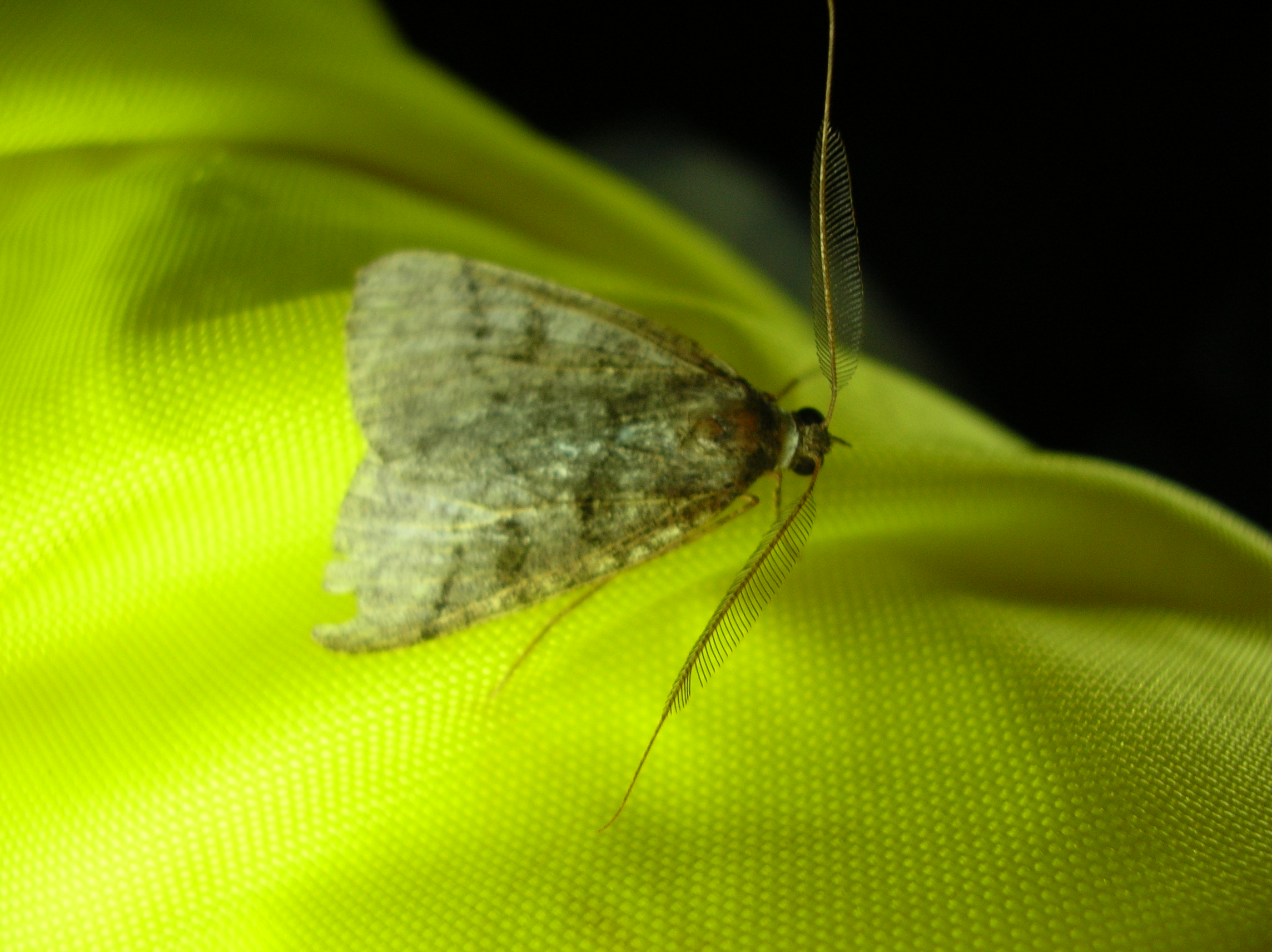

Scientific classification
- Domain: Eukaryota
- Kingdom: Animalia
- Phylum: Arthropoda
- Class: Insecta
- Order: Lepidoptera
- Family: Geometridae
- Genus: Scotorythra
- Species: S. rara

Binomial name
- Scotorythra rara (Butler, 1879)

Synonyms
- Scotosia rara Butler, 1879

= Scotorythra rara =

Species of moth

Scotorythra rara is a moth of the family Geometridae. It was first described by Arthur Gardiner Butler in 1879. It is endemic to the Hawaiian islands of Kauai, Oahu, Molokai, Maui and Hawaii.

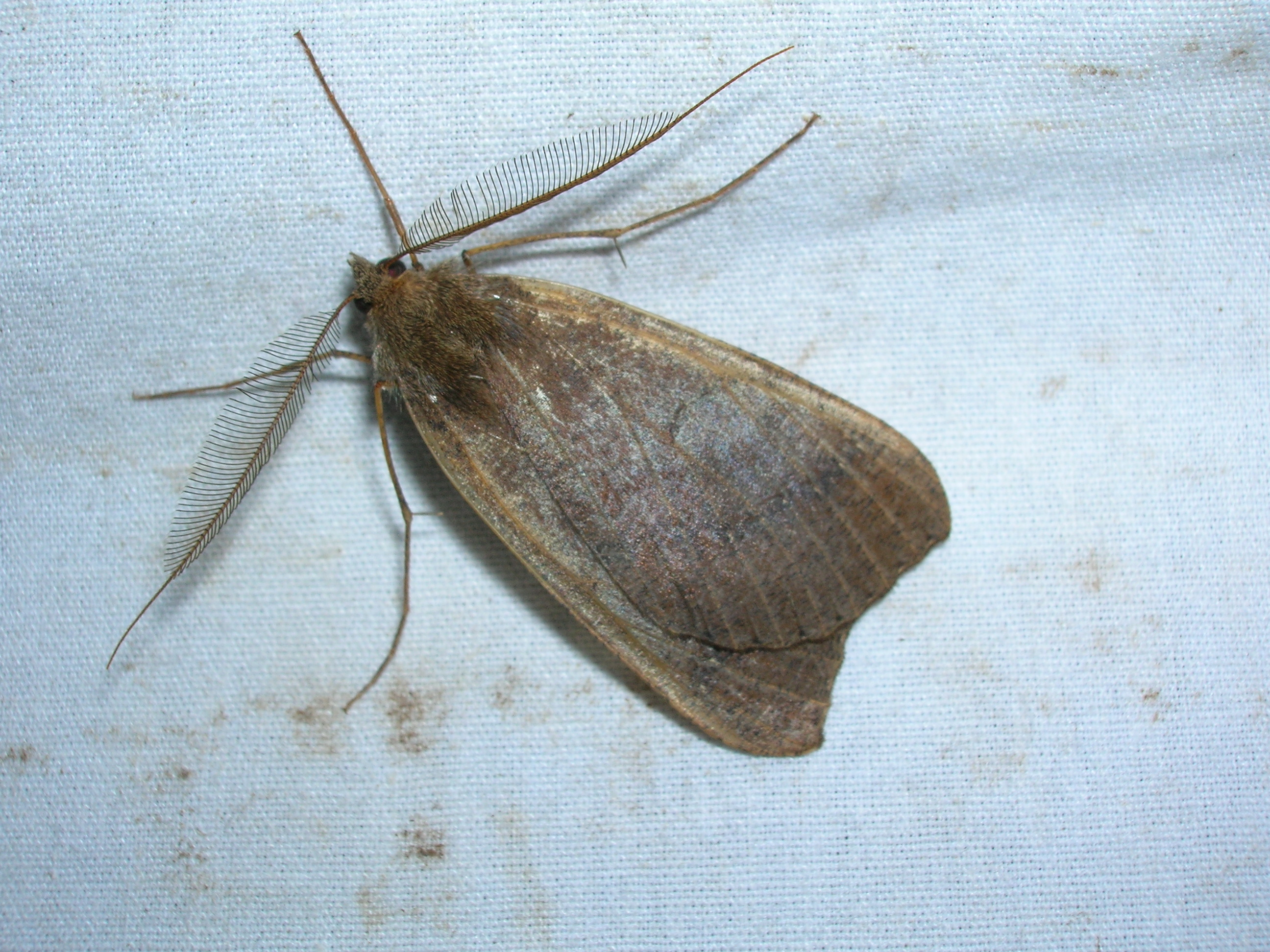

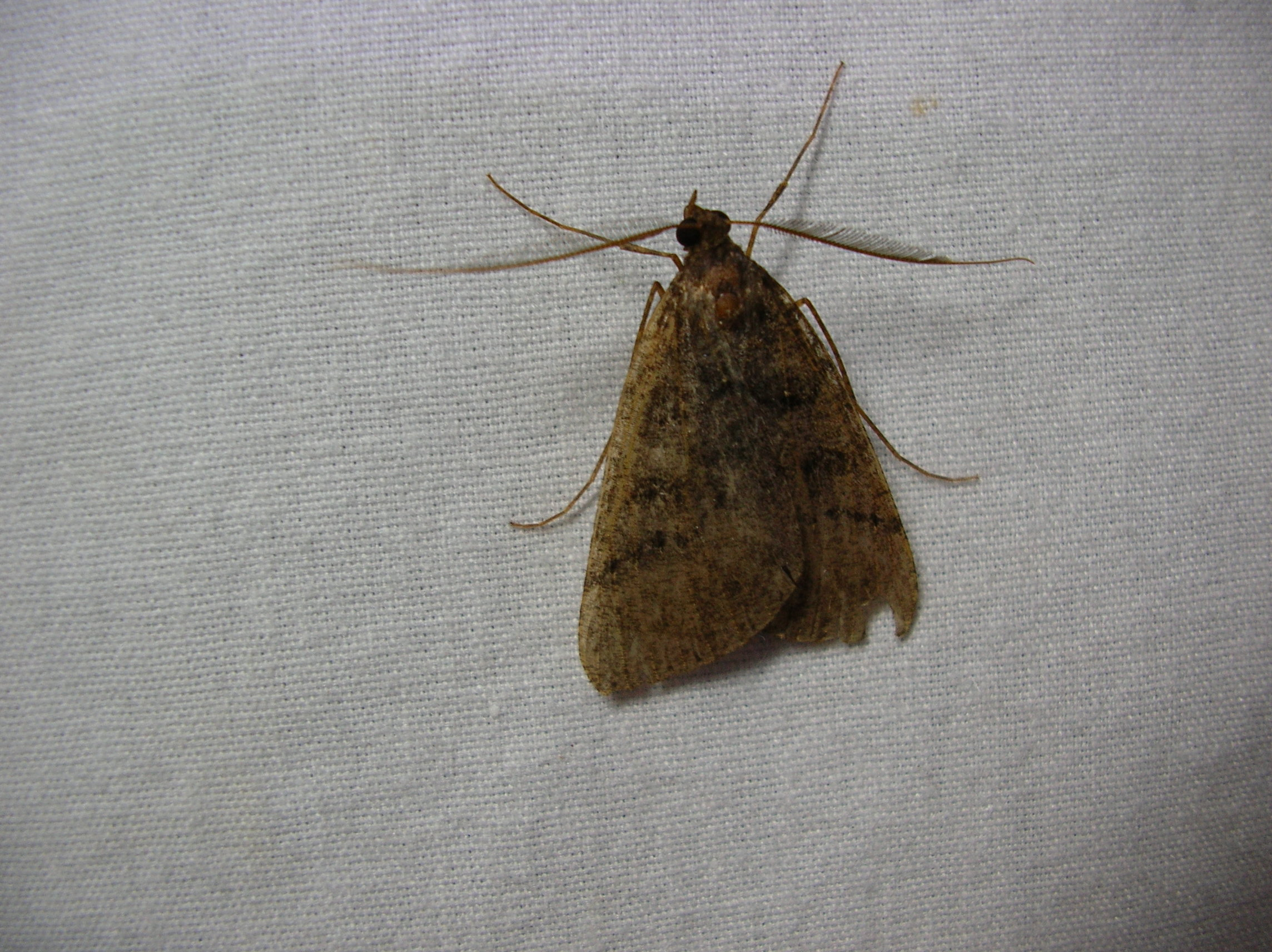

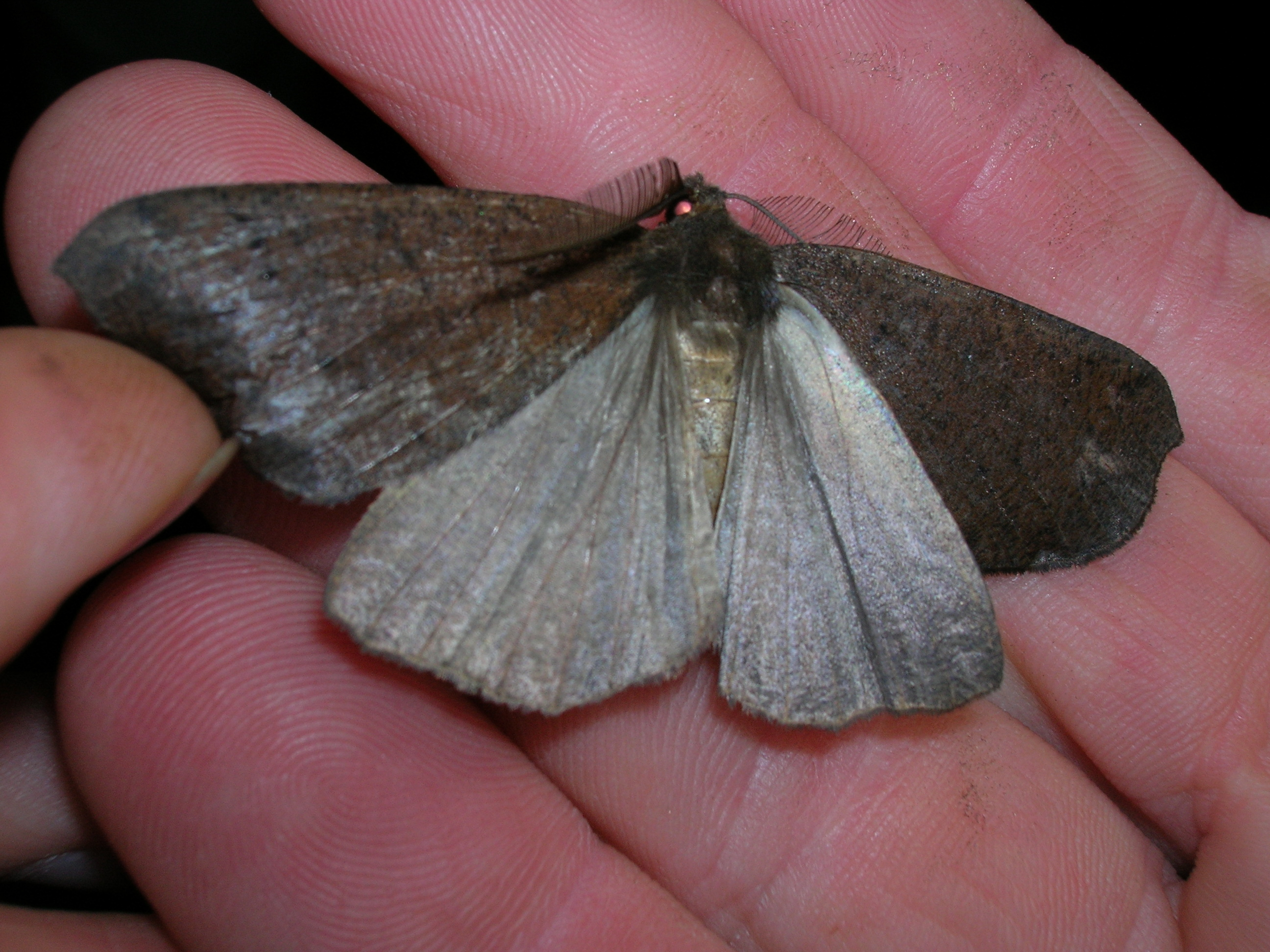

The larvae feed on Acacia koa, Cheirodendron gaudichaudii, Cibotium, Cyrtandra, Elaeocarpus, guava, Metrosideros, Melicope, Pipturus, Rubus hawaiiensis, Sapindus, Straussia and Vaccinium.
