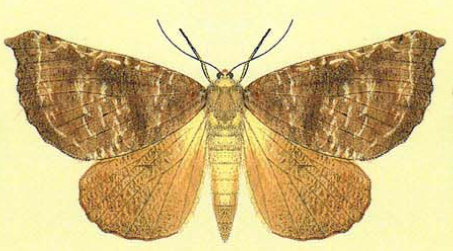
- Female

Conservation status
- Extinct (IUCN 2.3)

Scientific classification
- Kingdom: Animalia
- Phylum: Arthropoda
- Class: Insecta
- Order: Lepidoptera
- Family: Geometridae
- Genus: Scotorythra
- Species: †S. megalophylla

Binomial name
- †Scotorythra megalophylla Meyrick, 1899

Synonyms
- Acrodrepanis megalophylla (Meyrick, 1899)

= Kona giant looper moth =

Extinct species of moth

The Kona giant looper moth (Scotorythra megalophylla) is an extinct species of moth in the family Geometridae. The species was first described by Edward Meyrick in 1899. It was endemic to Hawaii.

This species had a wingspan of about three inches (8 cm), and was the second largest endemic moth in Hawaii, surpassed only by the still-extant Blackburn's sphinx (Manduca blackburni).
