= Ricinolein =

Names
- Systematic IUPAC name Propane-1,2,3-triyl tris[(9Z,12R)-12-hydroxyoctadec-9-enoate]
- Other names Glycerin triricinoleate; Glycerol triricinoleate; Glyceryl triricinoleate; Ricinoleic acid triglyceride; Ricinoleic triglyceride; Triricinolein

Identifiers
| CAS Number | 2540-54-7 |
| 3D model (JSmol) | Interactive image |
| ChEBI | CHEBI:140471 |
| ChemSpider | 9939216 |
| ECHA InfoCard | 100.018.016 |
| EC Number | 219-817-0 |
| PubChem CID | 11764524 |
| UNII | NZ59BAU9ZN |
| CompTox Dashboard (EPA) | DTXSID2051926 |
- InChI: InChI=1S/C57H104O9/c1-4-7-10-31-40-51(58)43-34-25-19-13-16-22-28-37-46-55(61)64-49-54(66-57(63)48-39-30-24-18-15-21-27-36-45-53(60)42-33-12-9-6-3)50-65-56(62)47-38-29-23-17-14-20-26-35-44-52(59)41-32-11-8-5-2/h25-27,34-36,51-54,58-60H,4-24,28-33,37-50H2,1-3H3/b34-25-,35-26-,36-27-/t51-,52-,53-/m1/s1
- SMILES: O=C(CCCCCCC/C=C\C[C@H](O)CCCCCC)OCC(OC(CCCCCCC/C=C\C[C@H](O)CCCCCC)=O)COC(CCCCCCC/C=C\C[C@H](O)CCCCCC)=O

Properties
| Chemical formula | C_{57}H_{104}O_{9} |
| Molar mass | 933.450 g·mol^{−1} |
- Except where otherwise noted, data are given for materials in their standard state (at 25 °C [77 °F], 100 kPa). Infobox references

Ricinolein is the chief constituent of castor oil and is the triglyceride of ricinoleic acid. Castor oil, the expressed natural fatty oil of the seeds of Ricinus communis also contains mixtures of the glycerides of isoricinoleic acids and much smaller traces of tristearin and the glyceride of dihydroxysteric acid. Ricinolein is the active principle in the use of castor oil as a purgative and solvent for several medically useful alkaloids.
