= Scotorythra brunnea =

Scientific classification
- Domain: Eukaryota
- Kingdom: Animalia
- Phylum: Arthropoda
- Class: Insecta
- Order: Lepidoptera
- Family: Geometridae
- Genus: Scotorythra
- Species: S. brunnea

Binomial name
- Scotorythra brunnea (Warren, 1896)

Synonyms
- Scotorythra rara ab. brunnea Warren, 1896; Scotorythra brachytarsa Meyrick, 1899

Species of moth

Scotorythra brunnea is a moth of the family Geometridae. It was first described by William Warren in 1896. It is endemic to the Hawaiian islands of Kauai, Oahu, Molokai, Maui and Hawaii.

The wingspan is 40–45 mm.

Larvae have been reared from guava.
