= Ricinelaidic acid =

Names
- Preferred IUPAC name (9E,12R)-12-Hydroxyoctadec-9-enoic acid
- Other names (+)-(R)-Ricinelaidic acid

Identifiers
CAS Number	540-12-5
3D model (JSmol)	Interactive image
ChEBI	CHEBI:45478
ChemSpider	393218
PubChem CID	445641
UNII	9O64E391KI
CompTox Dashboard (EPA)	DTXSID801316395
- InChI: InChI=1S/C18H34O3/c1-2-3-4-11-14-17(19)15-12-9-7-5-6-8-10-13-16-18(20)21/h9,12,17,19H,2-8,10-11,13-16H2,1H3,(H,20,21)/b12-9+/t17-/m1/s1 Key: WBHHMMIMDMUBKC-XLNAKTSKSA-N; InChI=1/C18H34O3/c1-2-3-4-11-14-17(19)15-12-9-7-5-6-8-10-13-16-18(20)21/h9,12,17,19H,2-8,10-11,13-16H2,1H3,(H,20,21)/b12-9+/t17-/m1/s1 Key: WBHHMMIMDMUBKC-XLNAKTSKBT
- SMILES: O=C(O)CCCCCCC/C=C/C[C@H](O)CCCCCC

Properties
Chemical formula	C_{18}H_{34}O_{3}
Molar mass	298.467 g·mol^{−1}
Appearance	Colorless waxy solid
Melting point	49–50 °C (120–122 °F; 322–323 K)
- Except where otherwise noted, data are given for materials in their standard state (at 25 °C [77 °F], 100 kPa). verify (what is ?) Infobox references

Ricinelaidic acid or (+)-(R)-ricinelaidic acid is an organic compound with the formula CH_{3}(CH_{2})_{5}CH(OH)CH_{2}CH=CH(CH_{2})_{7}CO_{2}H. It is an unsaturated omega-9 trans fatty acid. It is prepared by isomerization of the cis isomer, ricinoleic acid, which is a major constituent of castor oil.

== Further information ==
- Wright, Amanda J.; Marangoni, Alejandro G. (2007). "Time, temperature, and concentration dependence of ricinelaidic acid-canola oil organogelation". Journal of the American Oil Chemists' Society. 84 (1): 3–9. doi:10.1007/s11746-006-1012-6. S2CID 96323666.
