= Scotorythra crocorrhoa =

Scientific classification
- Domain: Eukaryota
- Kingdom: Animalia
- Phylum: Arthropoda
- Class: Insecta
- Order: Lepidoptera
- Family: Geometridae
- Genus: Scotorythra
- Species: S. crocorrhoa

Binomial name
- Scotorythra crocorrhoa Meyrick, 1928

Species of moth

Scotorythra crocorrhoa is a moth of the family Geometridae. It was first described by Edward Meyrick in 1928. It is endemic to the Hawaiian island of Kauai.
