= Ricinoleic acid =

Names
- Preferred IUPAC name (9Z,12R)-12-Hydroxyoctadec-9-enoic acid
- Other names (R)-12-Hydroxy-9-cis-octadecenoic acid

Identifiers
CAS Number	141-22-0
3D model (JSmol)	Interactive image
ChEBI	CHEBI:28592
ChemSpider	558800
ECHA InfoCard	100.004.974
KEGG	C08365
PubChem CID	643684
UNII	I2D0F69854
CompTox Dashboard (EPA)	DTXSID0041567
- InChI: InChI=1S/C18H34O3/c1-2-3-4-11-14-17(19)15-12-9-7-5-6-8-10-13-16-18(20)21/h9,12,17,19H,2-8,10-11,13-16H2,1H3,(H,20,21)/b12-9-/t17-/m1/s1 Key: WBHHMMIMDMUBKC-QJWNTBNXSA-N; InChI=1/C18H34O3/c1-2-3-4-11-14-17(19)15-12-9-7-5-6-8-10-13-16-18(20)21/h9,12,17,19H,2-8,10-11,13-16H2,1H3,(H,20,21)/b12-9-/t17-/m1/s1 Key: WBHHMMIMDMUBKC-QJWNTBNXBT
- SMILES: O=C(O)CCCCCCC\C=C/C[C@H](O)CCCCCC

Properties
Chemical formula	C_{18}H_{34}O_{3}
Molar mass	298.461 g/mol
Appearance	Yellow viscous liquid
Density	0.945 g/cm^{3}
Melting point	5 °C (41 °F; 278 K)
Boiling point	245 °C (473 °F; 518 K)

Hazards
NFPA 704 (fire diamond)	0 1 0
Flash point	228 °C (442 °F; 501 K)
Safety data sheet (SDS)	Fisher Scientific
- Except where otherwise noted, data are given for materials in their standard state (at 25 °C [77 °F], 100 kPa). verify (what is ?) Infobox references

Ricinoleic acid, formally called 12-hydroxy-9-cis-octadecenoic acid, is a fatty acid. It is an unsaturated omega-9 fatty acid and a hydroxy acid. It is a major component of the seed oil obtained from the seeds of castor plant (Ricinus communis L., Euphorbiaceae), the plant that produces ricin. It is also found in the sclerotium of ergot (Claviceps purpurea Tul., Clavicipitaceae). About 90% of the fatty acid content in castor oil is the ricinolein.

== Production ==
Ricinoleic acid is manufactured for industries by saponification or fractional distillation of hydrolyzed castor oil.

The first attempts to prepare ricinoleic acid were made by Friedrich Krafft in 1888.

== Use ==
Sebacic acid ((CH_{2})_{8}(CO_{2}H)_{2}), which is used in preparing certain nylons, is produced by cleavage of ricinoleic acid. The coproduct is 2-octanol. The mechanism of the base-induced cleavage is proposed to proceed by initial dehydrogenation of the secondary alcohol, affording the ketone. The resulting α,β-unsaturated ketone undergoes retroaldol reaction, resulting in lysis of the C-C bond.

The zinc salt is used in personal care products such as deodorants.

== See also ==
- Castor oil
- Lesquerolic acid, a similar chemical, which could be described as ricinoleic acid with -CH_{2}-CH_{2}- group inserted between carboxyl group and the double bond.
- Polyglycerol polyricinoleate, a polymer of glycerol with ricinoleic acid side chains, used as an emulsifier in chocolate
- Ricinelaidic acid, the trans isomer of ricinoleic acid
- Ricinolein, the triglyceride of ricinoleic acid
- Sodium ricinoleate, the sodium salt of ricinoleic acid
- Undecylenic acid, a product of pyrolysis of ricinoleic acid
