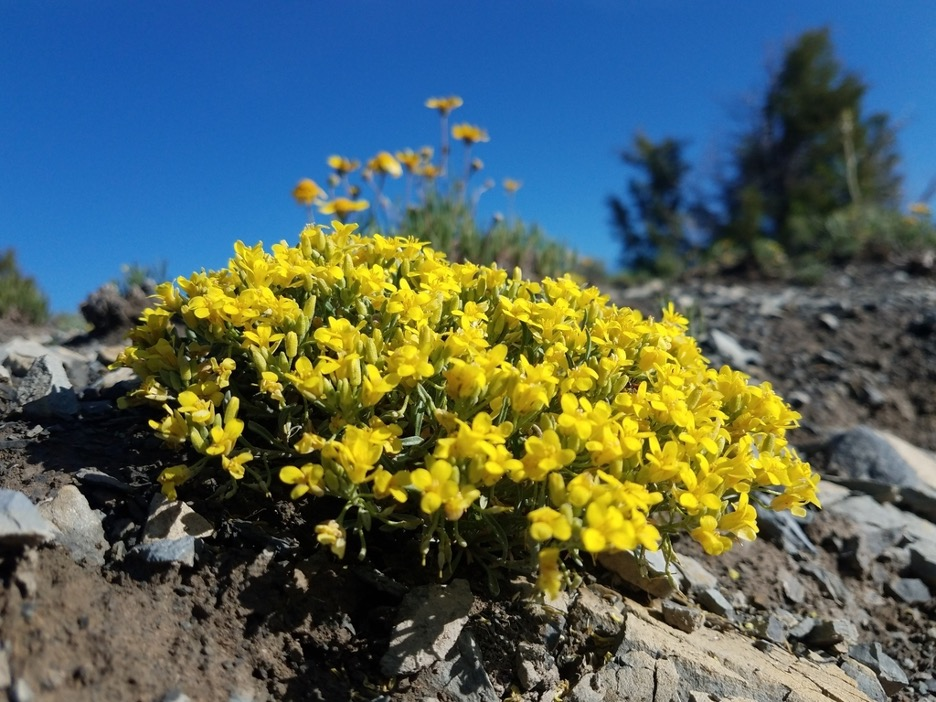
- Physaria pulvinata in bloom

Conservation status
- Critically Imperiled (NatureServe)

Scientific classification
- Kingdom: Plantae
- Clade: Tracheophytes
- Clade: Angiosperms
- Clade: Eudicots
- Clade: Rosids
- Order: Brassicales
- Family: Brassicaceae
- Genus: Physaria
- Species: P. pulvinata

Binomial name
- Physaria pulvinata O'Kane & Reveal
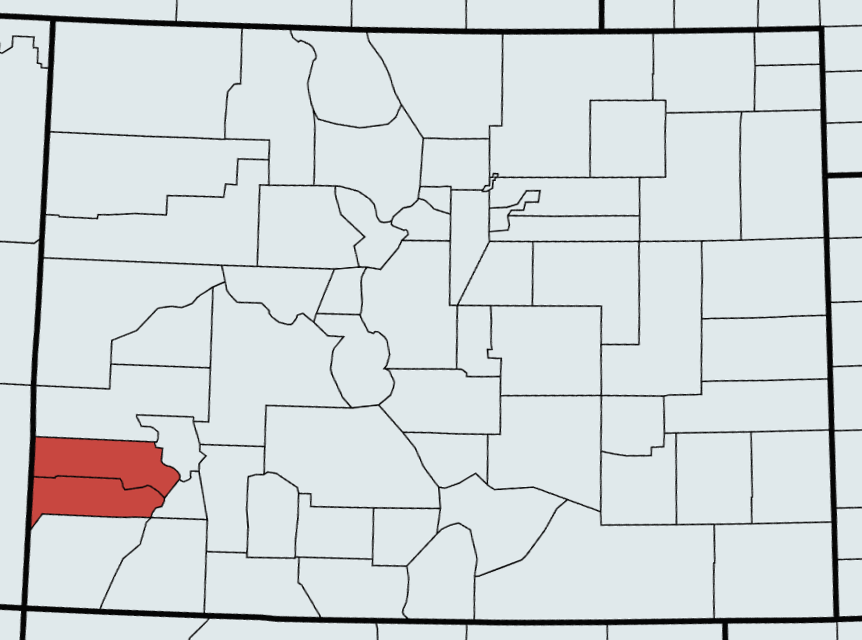
- County level distribution in Colorado

= Physaria pulvinata =

Plant species in the mustard family

Physaria pulvinata is a flowering plant species in the family Brassicaceae known by the common name cushion bladderpod. It is a rare species endemic to the Mancos Shale Barrens of Dolores and San Miguel counties in southwest Colorado. Described by Steve O'Kane and James L. Reveal in 2006, this plant grows in dense mats with yellow flowers, gray stellate hairs, and ellipsoid fruits. This plant is considered a sensitive species and faces many threats including grazing, road construction, shale mining, invasive species and climate change.

== Description ==
Physaria pulvinata is a compact plant which grows close to the ground in dense mats. The plant is heavily covered with stellate hairs causing it to appear gray-green in color. Flowers are yellow with four spatulate petals each around 4–7 mm in length. Fruits are pubescent, compressed, ellipsoid and 4–6 mm in length. It is a long lived perennial plant with reddish stems and a deep taproot. P. pulvinata is less than 30 cm across and forms a densely branching system of several hundred stalks each with clusters of narrow entire-margined leaves.

== Taxonomy ==
Physaria pulvinata is a flowering plant of the family Brassicaceae. The word "Pulvinus" means cushion in latin and the plant is named so due to its low-lying and densely matted structure. This plant was described by Steve O'Kane and James Reveal in 2006.. Physaria pulvinata is most closely related to Physaria intermedia and Physaria navajoensis both of which are also recently described, low growing plants with narrow leaves. While it is closely related to these two species, P. pulvinata is quite distinct and unlikely to be confused with either as P. intermedia does not grow in dense mounds and P. navajoensis lacks pubescent fruit.

== Distribution ==
Physaria pulvinata is a rare species endemic to a few small areas of Dolores County and San Miguel County in western Colorado. Its distribution is restricted to the Mancos Shale barrens located at the eastern edge of the Colorado Plateau within the Dolores River Basin. This area is semi-desert with mountains to the east and desert in all other directions. It is found at elevations ranging from 2,299–2,587 meters (7,543–8,488 ft). The estimated range of P. pulvinata is very small due to its habitat requirement and is estimated at around 55 square kilometers (21 square miles). Its range is owned or managed by a variety of parties including 35% privately held, 52% managed by Colorado Parks and Wildlife (including 32% in State Parks), 8% managed by the US Forest Service, 4% by the SLB and 1% by the US Bureau of Land Management. A main site where P. pulvinata has been documented is Lone Mesa State Park. P. physaria's range is characterized by highly localized summer thunderstorms with august being the wettest month. This is an arid part of the world with an average annual precipitation of 40 cm (16 in). The average annual temperature is 55°F with mean maximum temperatures hottest in July at 83.7°F and mean minimum temperatures coldest in January at 37.6°F.

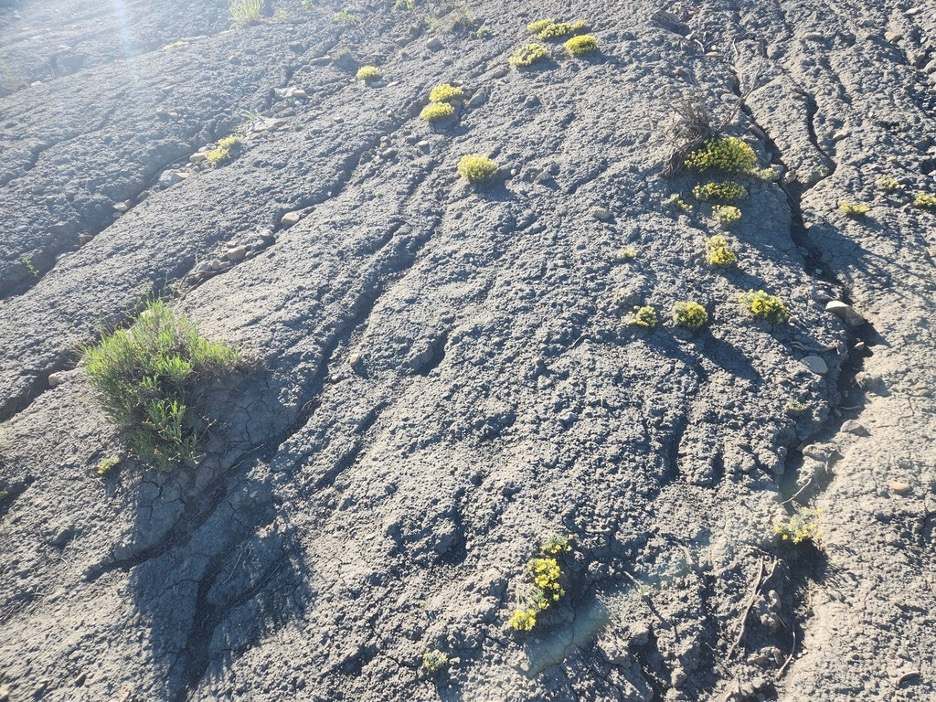
Mancos Shale Barrens, essential habitat for P. pulvinata

== Habitat ==
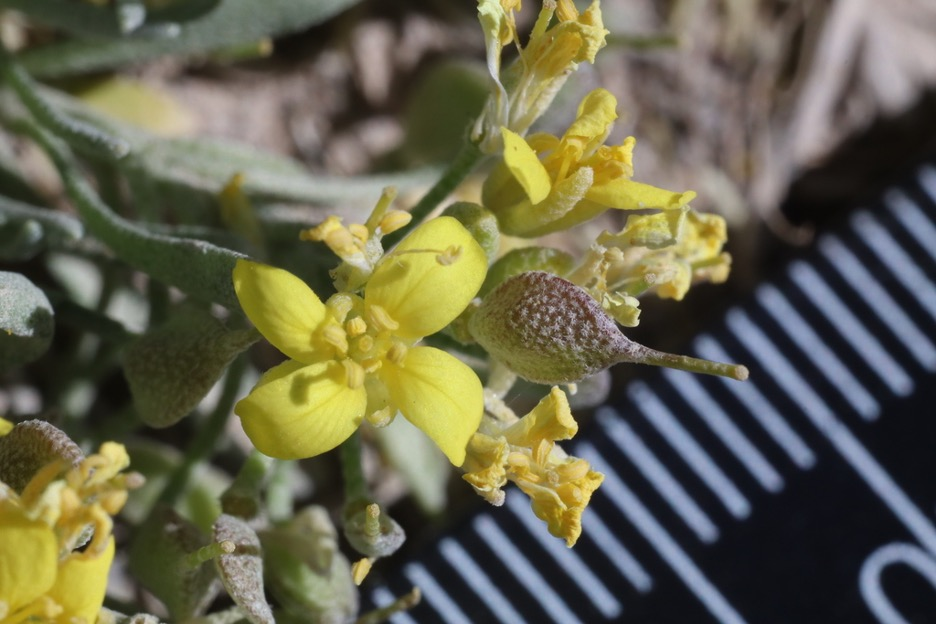
Physaria pulvinata fruit and flowers

Physaria pulvinata grows only on certain arid soils derived from the Mancos Shale formation known as the Mancos Shale Barrens. Mancos Shale was deposited as an organic-rich layer of finely stratified sedimentary rock in the Cretaceous Period when the Western Interior seaway covered much of what is now western North America. Two other species endemic to this habitat were described in 2009, Gutierrezia elegens and Pakera mancosana known as the lone mesa snakeweed and Mancos Shale packera respectively. This habitat drives plant adaptation and endemism due to its fine, clay-rich shallow soils. P. pulvinata prefers these shallow soils and uses its taproot to find water by entering cracks deep in the bedrock. The Mancos Shale Barrens are also known for their lack of an organic layer and the presence of a rocky top layer known as "chiprock". P. pulvinata tolerates chiprock the best of all local plants being the only species found in areas with above 80% chiprock. This plant has such a small tolerance range that it is seldom found locally where the soil is better developed and the rocks are more sparse. Within its small range, P. pulvinata grows quite densely with a surveyed population near the southern entrance of Lone Mesa State Park containing around 7,000 individual plants in an area of .32 kilometers. This plant is often found growing in a community predominately containing the low scrub genera Artemisia, Chrysopsis and Tetraneurus as well as forbs of the genera Sphaeralcea and Cryptantha.

== Life history ==
Little is known on the life history of Physaria pulvinata as it has been the subject of little scientific study. It is known that P. pulvinata flowers in June to July producing plentiful bright yellow flowers with four petals each. After pollination, P. pulvinata produces compressed ellipsoid fruits in August. How pollination occurs is unknown. The plant invests much energy into its long taproot which it uses to extract water from deep cracks in the bedrock.

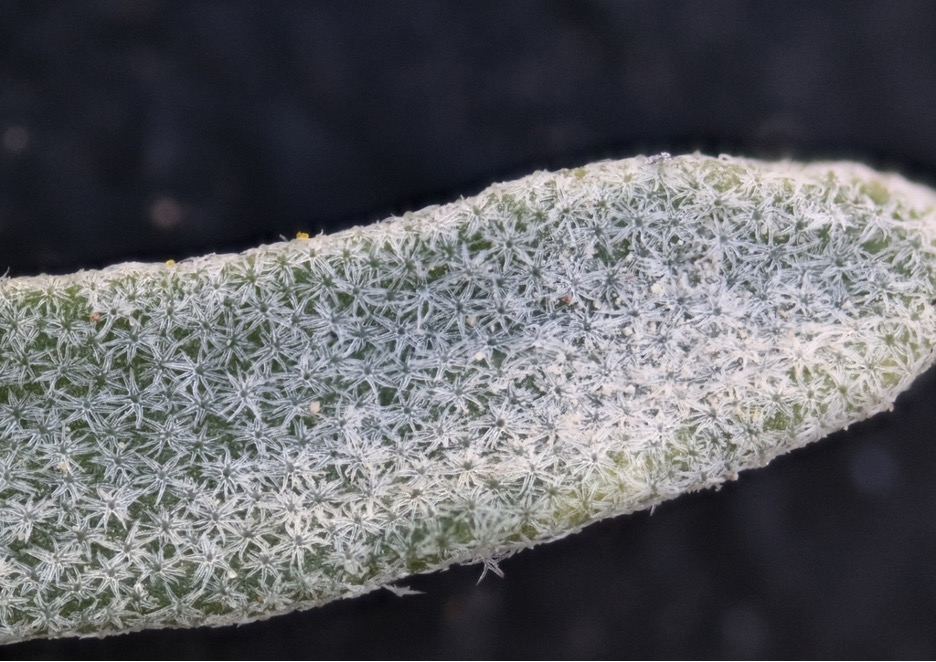
Stellate hairs of P. pulvinata leaf making it appear gray

== Threats ==
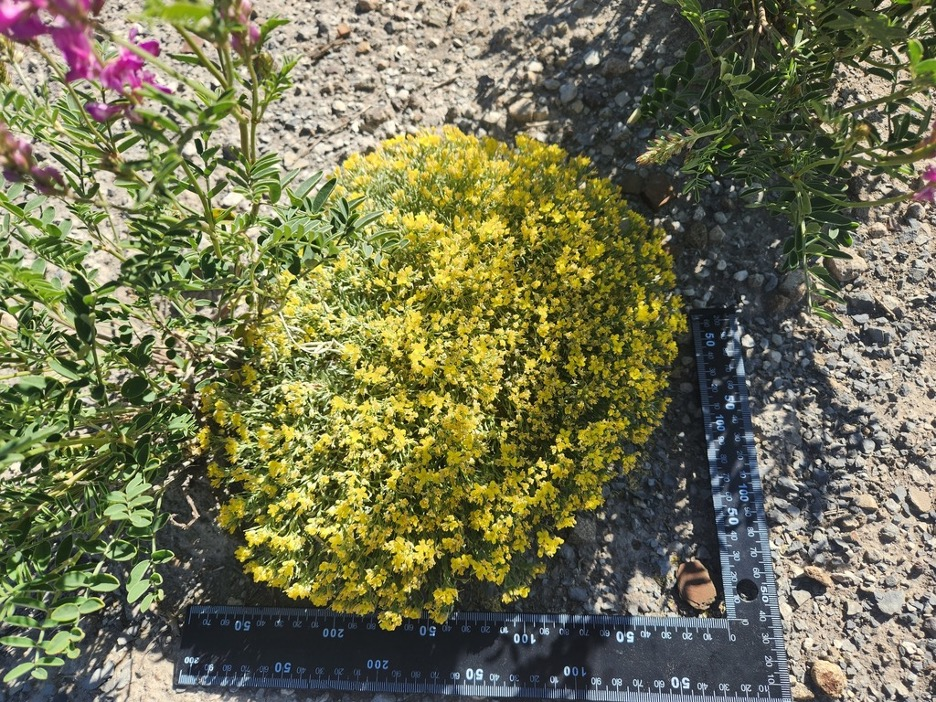
Physaria pulvinata mat growth form and size

Physaria pulvinata faces numerous threats to its continued existence including grazing, invasive species, shale mining, road maintenance and construction, off-roading, and climate change. Since P. pulvinata has a highly restricted range to a small part of two Colorado counties it is especially vulnerable. A prime concern in this plants conservation is the lack of awareness about it from the general public with very few people knowing it even exists. Road construction and maintenance is thought to be one of the greatest threats facing this species as they destroy habitat when built, spread invasive species, and facilitate human activities such as grazing and off-roading. Mining of the Mancos Shale for road construction projects is another problem for the species as it is highly dependent upon the shale. Colorado Parks and Wildlife State that the biggest threats to the species are climate change and severe weather, human disturbance and the general lack of knowledge about this plant. Climate change is identified as a primary threat because it is expected to alter this plants habitat which are already islands of habitat adrift within a matrix uninhabitable to P. pulvinata. With such a restricted range the plant will likely be unable to migrate to new habitat to deal with a changing climate and as it is so highly specialized it will likely not be able to niche shift quickly leaving it without the two main strategies plants have for dealing with changing climates.

== Conservation ==
Both the US Forest Service and Bureau of Land Management list P. pulvinata as a sensitive species and Colorado Parks and Wildlife list it as a tier 1 species of conservation concern but no protections are in place for the species at the federal or state level. In an assessment of conservation factors relevant to the species conducted by Rondeau et el in 2011 P. pulvinata was considered to be "poorly conserved". The biggest threats all appear to be road-related but conservationists believe these impacts can be mitigated with little effect on the completion of road projects. The Colorado Natural Heritage Program operated by Colorado State University performed an analysis on the species and wrote a report which recommends several actions regarding conservation of the plant. Their primary recommendation is to catalog where population of P. Pulvinata occur near local roads and to use that info to create special management units for populations of the plant alongside roads. These special management areas would be put under certain protections where actions such as herbicide spraying, mowing, seeding, fire fuel control and off-roading are prohibited to protect this sensitive species. In areas where noxious weeds threaten this native species, the Colorado Natural Heritage Program believes actions should be taken to bring them under control but that herbicide treatments should be limited to over 200m away from P. pulvinata populations except when the noxious weeds present a significant population or habitat level threat. The Colorado Natural Heritage Program also recommends regular monitoring of the plant's populations by experts to ensure that it is doing well and to determine whether further conservation actions or legal protections are necessary. Colorado Parks and Wildlife includes P. pulvinata in its State Wildlife Action Plan (SWAP) as a Tier 1 species of conservation concern. They perform annual surveys at Lone Mesa State Park and several other local public lands where P. pulvinata can be found but claim they lack knowledge of the locations of populations on private land. CPW recommends many conservation actions for the species such as further research into its life history and ecology, enforcing off-road vehicle restrictions, and evaluating how local projects might affect the plant before they are implemented. CPW designates many of these actions as high priority but admits that most recommended actions have not yet been initiated.
