= Bladderpod oil =

Bladderpod oil is a seed oil, extracted from the seeds of the Physaria fendleri and other species of genus Physaria, native to the plains and mesas of southwestern United States, eastward to Kansas and southward into northern Mexico. Bladderpod oil is rich in lesquerolic acid (C20:1-OH), a rare hydroxycarboxylic acid. The only commercial source of hydroxycarboxylic acids is ricinoleic acid (C18:1-OH), found in castor oil. Essentially all castor oil production in the U.S. has been eliminated by a combination of economic factors, excessive allergenic reactions of field and processing workers, and toxicity of the seed meal. The fatty acid composition of bladderpod oil is:

Fatty acid	Percentage
Palmitic	1.5%
Palmitoleic	1.4%
Stearic	2.4%
Oleic	15.2%
Linoleic	7.6%
Linolenic	13.1%
Ricinoleic	0.3%
Densipolic	0.2%
Lesquerolic	53.2%
Auricolic	3.8%

Other species of bladderpod that yield similar oils include Physaria lindheimeri, Paysonia densipilia, Paysonia auriculata and Physaria pallida. P. fendleri is of particular interest because of the yields of 1,500 kg/ha that have been achieved in only a few years of cultivation.

== Uses ==
The hydroxycarboxylic acids contained in bladderpod oil are an important raw material used in the manufacture of resins, waxes, nylons, plastics, corrosion inhibitors, coatings, lubricating greases and cosmetics.
