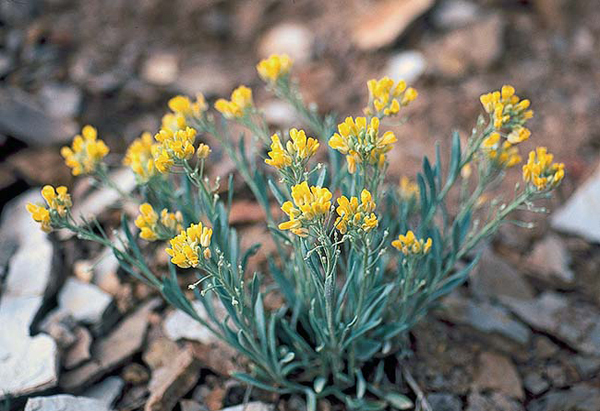

Conservation status
- Critically Imperiled (NatureServe)

Scientific classification
- Kingdom: Plantae
- Clade: Tracheophytes
- Clade: Angiosperms
- Clade: Eudicots
- Clade: Rosids
- Order: Brassicales
- Family: Brassicaceae
- Genus: Physaria
- Species: P. obcordata

Binomial name
- Physaria obcordata Rollins

= Physaria obcordata =

Species of flowering plant

Physaria obcordata is a rare species of flowering plant in the family Brassicaceae known by the common name Dudley Bluffs twinpod. It is similar in appearance to the more common Piceance twinpod, but can be distinguished by looking at the leaves through a hand lens. The Piceance twinpod, Physaria acutifolia has stellate hairs when viewed through a hand lens while Physaria ocordata has markings that look like a satellite dish, or a circle with a dot in the middle. It is endemic to Colorado, where it is found only in the Piceance Basin in Rio Blanco County. It is threatened by the loss and degradation of its habitat. It is a federally listed threatened species of the United States.

This plant was discovered in 1982 and described to science in 1983. Its Piceance Basin habitat is open, barren, and made up of white shale outcrops in the Green River Formation. The topography has been shaped by rivers cutting down through the substrate. Much of the rock is oil shale covering deposits of natural gas. Heavy petroleum exploration and extraction activities occur throughout the area, and the region is mined for minerals such as nahcolite and dawsonite. This mining and surveying activity is the main threat to the species and its relative, the Dudley Bluffs bladderpod (Physaria congesta). This threat is considered "imminent". 100% of the plant's habitat is potential territory for oil and mineral mining. The threat includes drilling activity as well as associated activities including road maintenance, pipeline installation, utilities, and construction of new housing and power plants. Increased pollution and dust may affect the plants.

The Dudley Bluffs twinpod is a perennial herb with a branching caudex covered with the shredded remains of previous seasons' leaves. The erect stems grow 12 to 18 centimeters tall. The wide lance-shaped basal leaves are 4 to 8 centimeters long. The upper leaves are narrower but not much shorter. The inflorescence is a loose raceme of flowers with yellow-green sepals and yellow petals up to a centimeter in length. The heart-shaped fruit is a hanging, inflated silique that is papery in texture and roughly half a centimeter long. The plant is pollinated by bees of the genera Halictus, Lasioglossum, Dialictus, and Andrena.

Though rare overall with a very small distribution, this plant is locally abundant, with 10,000 individuals at one site. There are ten occurrences and an estimated total of up to 27,800 individuals.
