= Physaria fremontii =

Conservation status
- Imperiled (NatureServe)

Scientific classification
- Kingdom: Plantae
- Clade: Tracheophytes
- Clade: Angiosperms
- Clade: Eudicots
- Clade: Rosids
- Order: Brassicales
- Family: Brassicaceae
- Genus: Physaria
- Species: P. fremontii

Binomial name
- Physaria fremontii (Rollins & E.A.Shaw) O'Kane & Al-Shehbaz

Synonyms
- Lesquerella fremontii Rollins & E.A.Shaw

Species of flowering plant

Physaria fremontii (syn. Lesquerella fremontii) is a species of flowering plant in the family Brassicaceae known by the common name Fremont's bladderpod. It is endemic to Wyoming in the United States, where it occurs only in and around the Wind River Range in Fremont County.

This species is a perennial herb growing from a taproot and producing decumbent or prostrate stems up to 15 centimeters long. The basal leaves are up to four or five centimeters long with oval blades borne on petioles. Longer, narrower leaves occur along the stems. The flowers have four yellow petals and measure 6 to 8 millimeters in length. The fruit is an inflated or flattened pod up to 7 millimeters long. It has a coating of hairs on the outer and inner surfaces.

This plant is a calciphile, growing only on limestone or rocks that are partly limestone or are derived from limestone. It can be found up to 11,100 feet in elevation, up to the subalpine climates of the local mountains. It may be grow in Festuca idahoensis plant communities, and it is often associated with Pinus flexilis and Artemisia tripartita. The habitat is open. The landscape may have few plants, or it may be covered in cushion plants or dry mountain meadow species. Associated plants include Arenaria congesta (ballhead sandwort), Balsamorhiza incana (hoary balsamroot), Draba oligosperma (few-seed draba), Elymus spicatus (bluebunch wheatgrass), Erigeron compositus (cut-leaved daisy), Haplopappus acaulis (stemless mock goldenweed), Hymenoxys acaulis (stemless hymenoxys), Hymenoxys richardsonii (Richardson’s hymenoxys), Koeleria macrantha (Junegrass), Lomatium cous (biscuitroot), Lupinus argenteus (silvery lupine), Oxytropis sericea (white locoweed), Phlox hoodii (Hood’s phlox), Phlox multiflora (many-flowered phlox), Poa secunda (Sandberg bluegrass), Potentilla ovina (sheep cinquefoil), Sedum lanceolatum (lance-leaved stonecrop), Senecio canus (woolly groundsel), and Townsendia spathulata (spoon-leaved Easter-daisy).

This plant's habitat is affected by road construction, limestone quarrying, and recreational activity such as off-road vehicle use.
