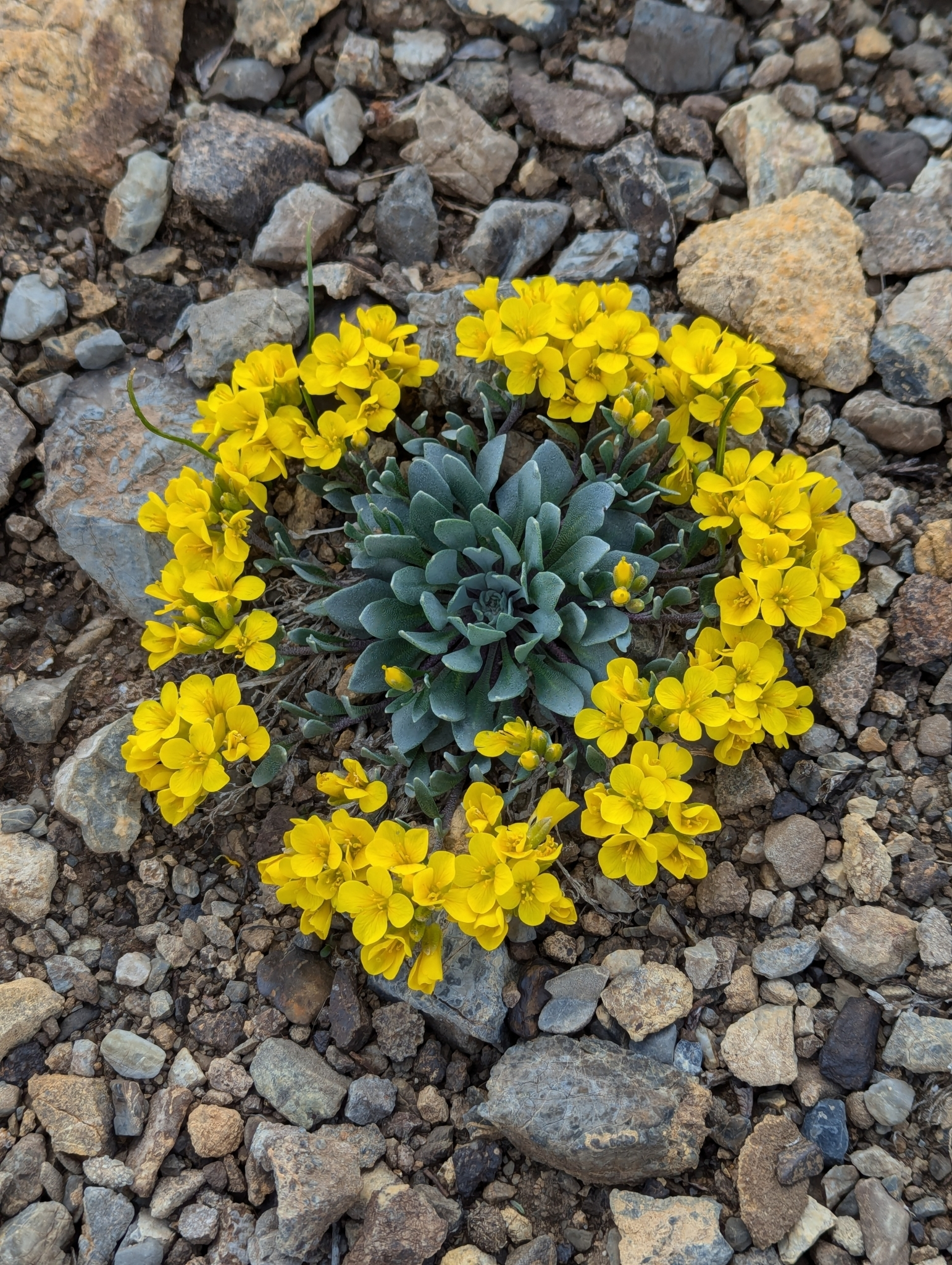
- South of Mount Lincoln in the Pike National Forest

Conservation status
- Imperiled (NatureServe)

Scientific classification
- Kingdom: Plantae
- Clade: Tracheophytes
- Clade: Angiosperms
- Clade: Eudicots
- Clade: Rosids
- Order: Brassicales
- Family: Brassicaceae
- Genus: Physaria
- Species: P. alpina

Binomial name
- Physaria alpina Rollins

= Physaria alpina =

Plant species in the cabbage family

Physaria alpina, also known as alpine twinpod or Avery Peak twinpod, is a rare plant species that only grows in the mountains of Colorado above timberline.

== Description ==
Alpine twinpod is easily recognized by its one rosette of basal leaves covered in silvery-hairs. The leaves and flowering stems sprout from a caudex, a shortened stem structure usually buried in the soil, that is atop a long taproot.

The leaf stems is slender and the leaf can be a broad or narrow tear-drop, delta, or egg shape that is 1.5 to 3.5 centimeters long. Usually leaf edges are smooth, but they can have a few faint teeth. The tip is usually broad, but can be somewhat sharp on narrower leaves. Examined closely the trichomes, the hairs covering the leaves, are stellate, shaped like tiny sea anemones.

The flowering stems grow horizontally 3 to 6 cm from under the rosette, each with two to five leaves that are similar to the basal leaves. The end of the stems turns upward with a loosely packed raceme of three to six flowers.

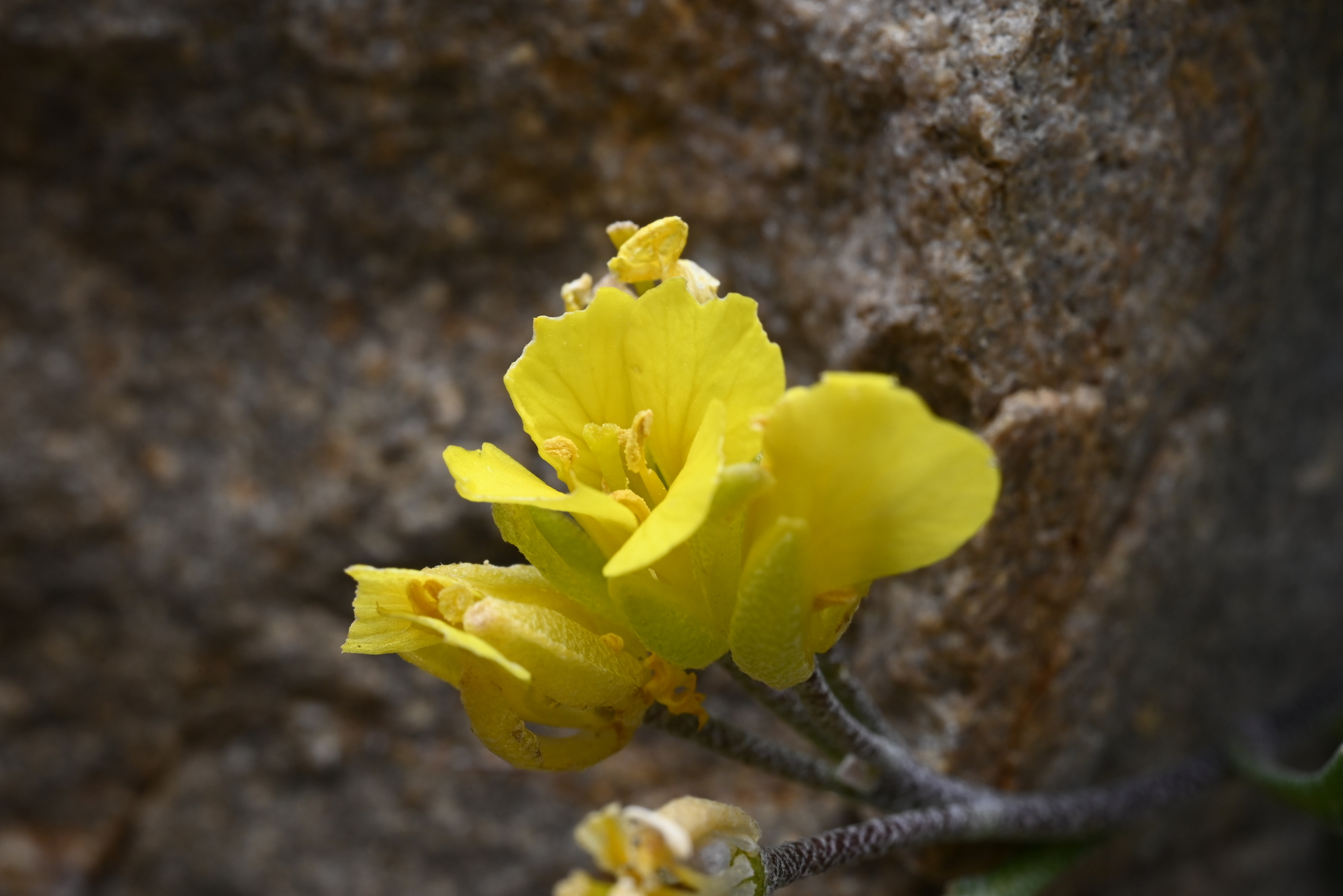
A group of flowers

The flower petals are bright yellow-orange and fairly large. They stand up from the flower rather than opening widely and are spatulate, spoon-shaped, with a length of 1–1.5 cm, though usually not longer than 1.2 cm. The sepals are narrow and 7–9 millimeters long.

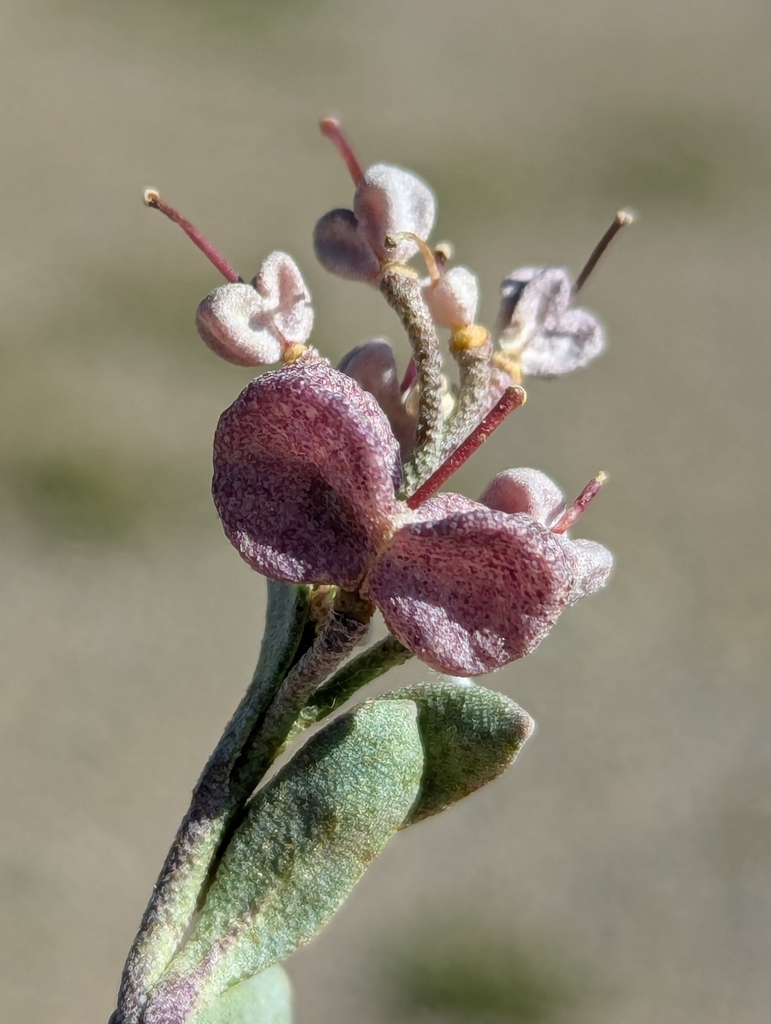
A fruit pod

The fruits are twined, somewhat angular pods that are like partly inflated balloons, 4–11 mm long and 10–13 mm wide. They turn somewhat purple as they ripen and are thickly covered in short hairs, but are not silvery. Each cavity will have one or two flattened seeds 2.5–3 mm across.

== Taxonomy ==
Physaria alpina was scientifically described and named in 1981 by Reed Clark Rollins. It is part of the genus Physaria which is classified in the Brassicaceae family. It has no subspecies or synonyms. The type specimen was collected by Paul Groff from a sandstone ridge of the Maroon Formation southwest of Avery Peak in the Elk Mountains on 20 July 1980.

=== Names ===
Physaria alpina is commonly known as Avery Peak twinpod or alpine twinpod.

== Range and habitat ==
Alpine twinpod is endemic to Colorado where it has been reported in just five counties, Park, Lake, Pitkin, Gunnison, and Delta. It grows in the drainage of the Gunnison River in the west and in the Mosquito Range in central Colorado. It ranges from 3,500 meters (11,500 ft) up to as much as 4,000 meters (13,000 ft).

Its habitat includes the open alpine tundra, on rocky ridges, in rocky scree at the base of cliffs, and in some disturbed areas such as roadcuts or the discarded spoils from mines. Areas where it grows are flat to slopes of 30 percent and have limestone and dolomite underneath them.

=== Conservation ===
The conservation organization NatureServe evaluated alpine twinpod in 2025 and rated it as imperiled at both the global and state level (G2, S2). Of the 16 places it has been documented, only four have excellent viability and the rest are only fair, unstudied, or have not been seen again. Direct threats include recreation and the potential reopening of mining sites as well as a moderate vulnerability to climate change. Experimentation with artificial aging of seeds indicate that it, like many other alpine plants, is likely to be difficult to store in a seed bank for long periods of time for conservation.

== Uses ==
Alpine twinpod is occasionally grown by rock gardeners and like many alpine twinpods are relatively easy to grow in fast-draining gravel beds or in trough gardens. It will reproduce from seed quite readily in suitable garden conditions, but does not do so rapidly that it crowds out other plants in troughs or raised bed. The seeds germinate readily, nearly all seeds experimented on, with or without cold-moist stratification when subjected to alternating light/dark cycles of 12 hours at 20 °C (68 °F) and 10 °C (50 °F) respectively. At colder alternating temperatures of 15 °C (59 °F) and 6 °C (43 °F) none sprout without cold-moist stratification and only around 30% could be induced to sprout with a 12-week treatment of stratification at 2–3 °C (36–37 °F).
