= Popweed =

Popweed may refer to:

- Fucus, a genus of seaweed
- Various plants in the family Brassicaceae, with seed pods that pop, especially:
  - Cardamine, a large genus of flowering plants in the mustard family
  - Lesquerella, a defunct species name
