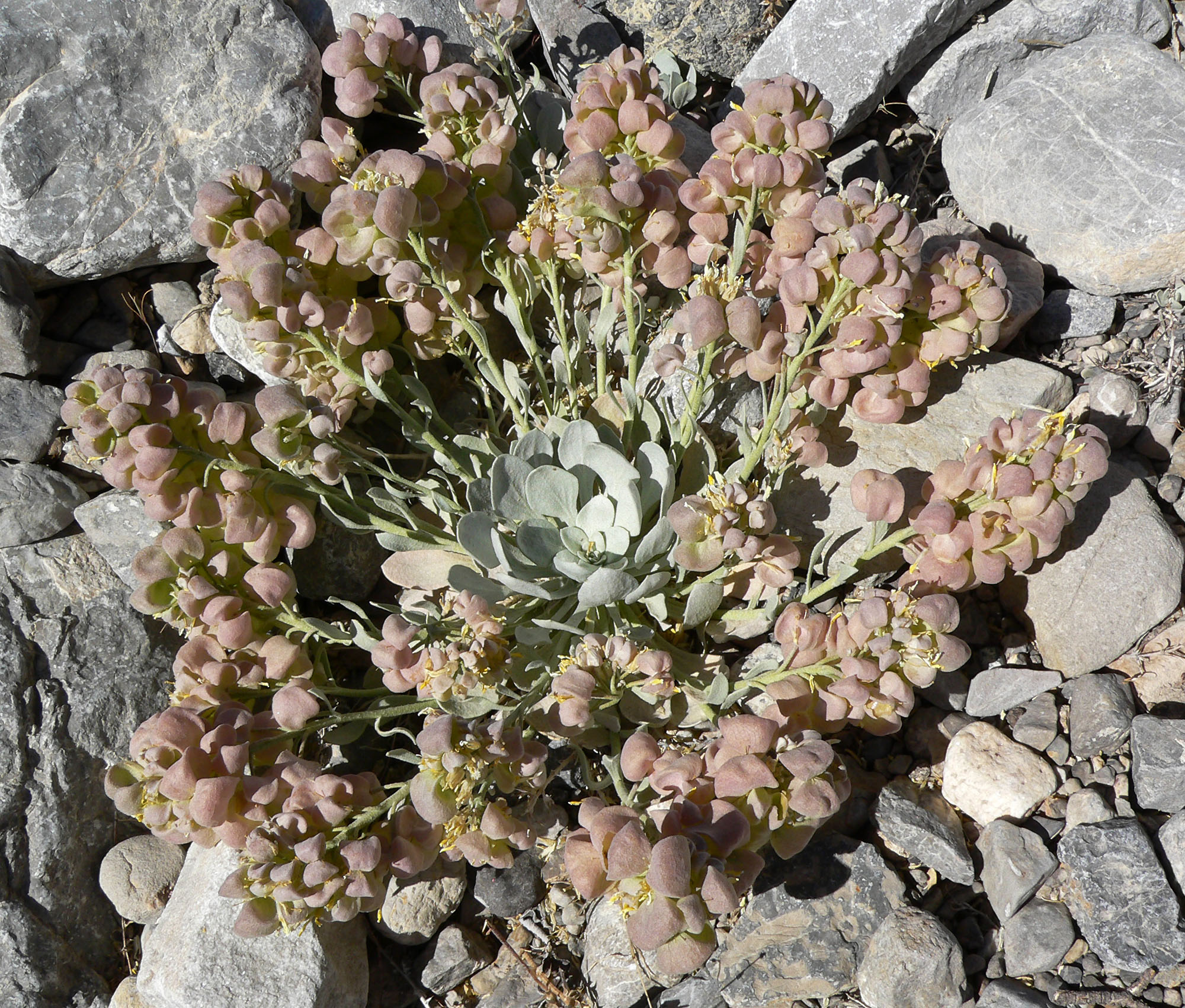
- plant in fruit

Scientific classification
- Kingdom: Plantae
- Clade: Tracheophytes
- Clade: Angiosperms
- Clade: Eudicots
- Clade: Rosids
- Order: Brassicales
- Family: Brassicaceae
- Genus: Physaria
- Species: P. chambersii

Binomial name
- Physaria chambersii Rollins

= Physaria chambersii =

Species of flowering plant

Physaria chambersii is a species of flowering plant in the family Brassicaceae known by the common name Chambers' twinpod. It is native to the southwestern United States, where it grows in desert woodland and plateau habitat. It is a perennial herb growing from a taproot and producing a clumpy rosette of stems up to 15 centimeters long, growing erect and falling over in fruit. The plant is covered in a silver-white coat of hairs. The leaves in the rosette are rounded to oval, up to 6 centimeters long by 2 wide, and smaller, spoon-shaped leaves are located along the stems. The inflorescence is a raceme of four-petalled golden yellow flowers. The fruit is an inflated pod which may be over a centimeter long. It is notched and divided into two chambers, each containing 4 seeds.
