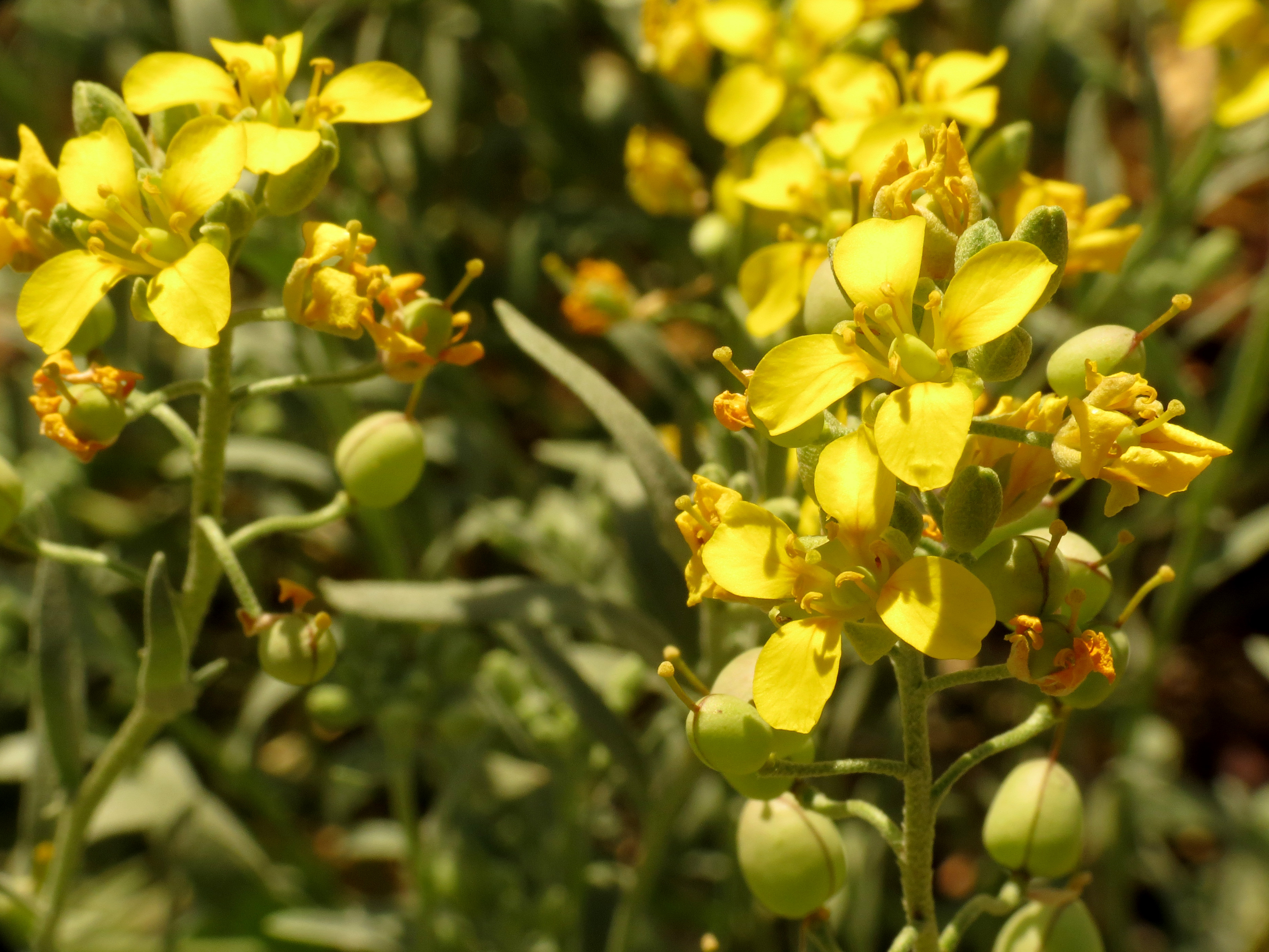
- Physaria gordonii in Rincon Heights, Tucson, Arizona, USA.

Conservation status
- Secure (NatureServe)

Scientific classification
- Kingdom: Plantae
- Clade: Tracheophytes
- Clade: Angiosperms
- Clade: Eudicots
- Clade: Rosids
- Order: Brassicales
- Family: Brassicaceae
- Genus: Physaria
- Species: P. gordonii

Binomial name
- Physaria gordonii (A. Gray) O'Kane & Al-Shehbaz

Subspecies
- Physaria gordonii densifolia

Synonyms
- Lesquerella gordonii; Vesicaria gordonii; Alyssum gordonii

= Physaria gordonii =

Species of flowering plant

Physaria gordonii, commonly known as Gordon's bladderpod, is a species of plant in the family Brassicaceae distributed throughout the Southwestern United States and Northern Mexico. It is a winter annual wildflower, maturing between April and June. The plant normally grows in sandy or gravel deserts. The plant has low-growing stems, with long, lanceolate leaves measuring about 4 in (10 cm). The plants flowers are in a loose, raceme cluster, and are radially symmetrical. The plant is very similar to P. fendleri.
