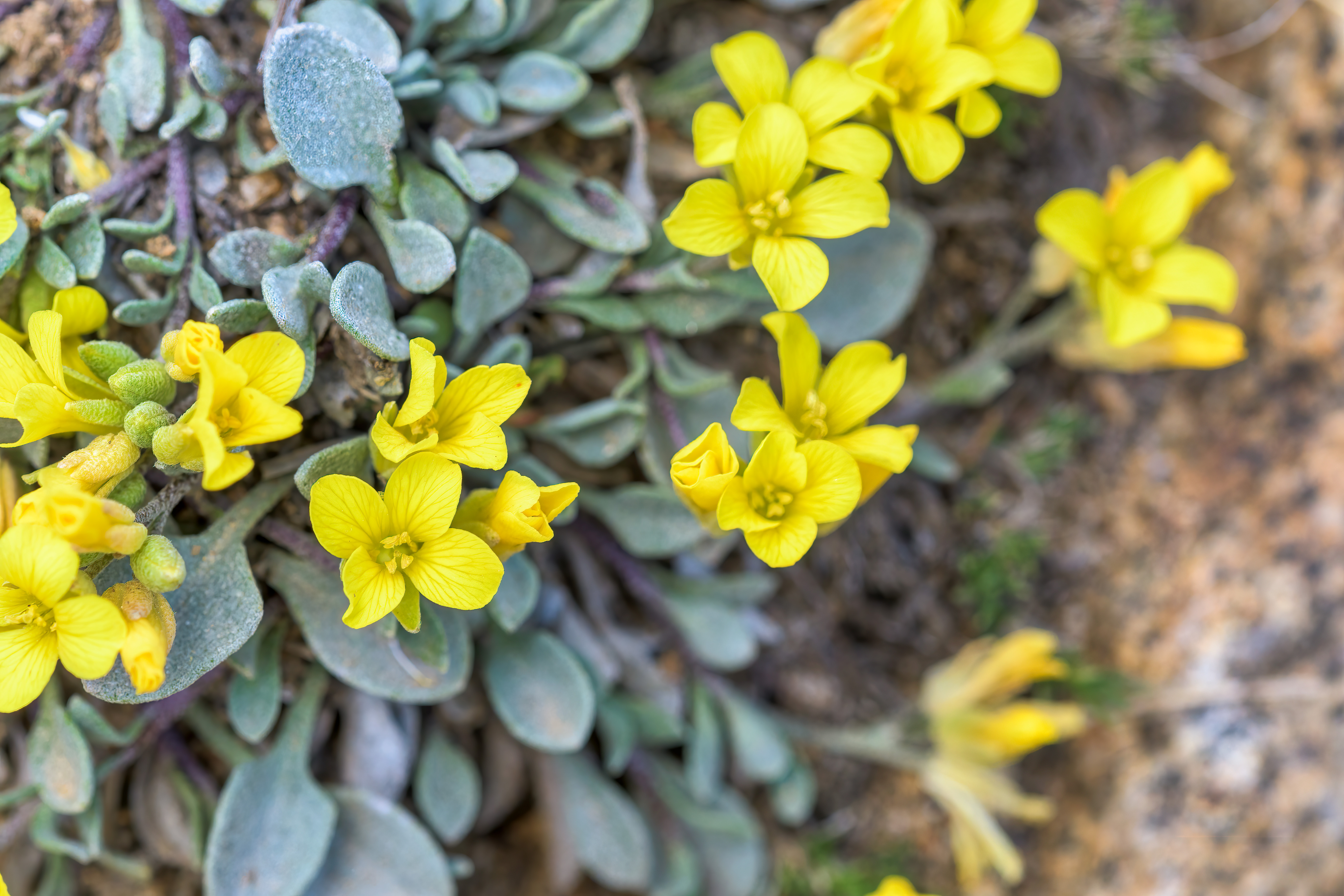

Scientific classification
- Kingdom: Plantae
- Clade: Tracheophytes
- Clade: Angiosperms
- Clade: Eudicots
- Clade: Rosids
- Order: Brassicales
- Family: Brassicaceae
- Genus: Physaria
- Species: P. humilis

Binomial name
- Physaria humilis (Rollins) O'Kane & Al-Shehbaz

Synonyms
- Lesquerella humilis Rollins

= Physaria humilis =

Species of plant

Physaria humilis, the St. Marys Peak bladderpod or Bitterroot bladderpod, is a species within the family Brassicaceae that is endemic to the Bitterroot Mountains of Montana.

== Range ==
Montana endemic restricted to a very small area of the Bitterroot Mountains of Ravalli County, Montana with only a few known occurrences.

== Habitat ==
Rocky, granite-derived soil on open slopes, primarily in the subalpine and alpine zones.

== Ecology ==
Flowers in late June-August, fruiting in July-August.

== Etymology ==
Physaria humilis (originally known as Lesquerella humilis) was formerly described as a species in 1984 by Dr. Reed Rollins. It was first discovered on St. Joseph Peak in the Bitterroot Range in 1966, by Klaus H. Lackschewitz and Tor Fageraas. This first specimen, and other early collections, were variously labeled as Lesguerella alpina, Physaria didvmocarpa, or P. geveri, but Rollins ultimately determined that they represented a previously undescribed species. The type specimen was collected in 1983 by Reed C. and Kathryn W. Rollins, with Lackschewitz, Peter Lesica, and Aileen G. Roads, near the summit of St. Mary Peak, also in the Bitterroot Range.
