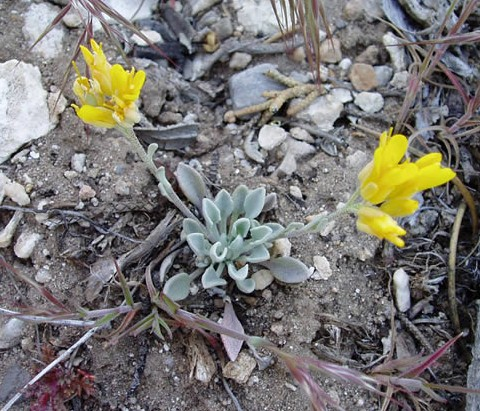
- subsp. bernardina

Conservation status
- Secure (NatureServe)

Scientific classification
- Kingdom: Plantae
- Clade: Tracheophytes
- Clade: Angiosperms
- Clade: Eudicots
- Clade: Rosids
- Order: Brassicales
- Family: Brassicaceae
- Genus: Physaria
- Species: P. kingii

Binomial name
- Physaria kingii (S.Watson) O’Kane & Al-Shehbaz

= Physaria kingii =

Species of flowering plant

Physaria kingii is a species of flowering plant in the family Brassicaceae known by the common name King bladderpod. It is native to western North America from Utah to Baja California, where it grows in dry and rocky habitat, such as deserts and adjacent mountain slopes. This is a perennial herb growing a small, hairy stem from a caudex. The leaves form a patch or rosette around the caudex, each up to 6 centimeters long and round, oval, diamond, or spoonlike in shape. The inflorescence is an erect or mostly upright raceme of bright yellow mustardlike flowers. The fruit is a hairy capsule under a centimeter long suspended on a short, often curvy pedicel.

There are three subspecies. One, the San Bernardino Mountains bladderpod (subsp. bernardina), is a very rare plant known from only a few spots near Big Bear in the San Bernardino Mountains of southern California. Because of threats to the plant from mining and other human activities, this subspecies is treated as an endangered species on the federal level.
