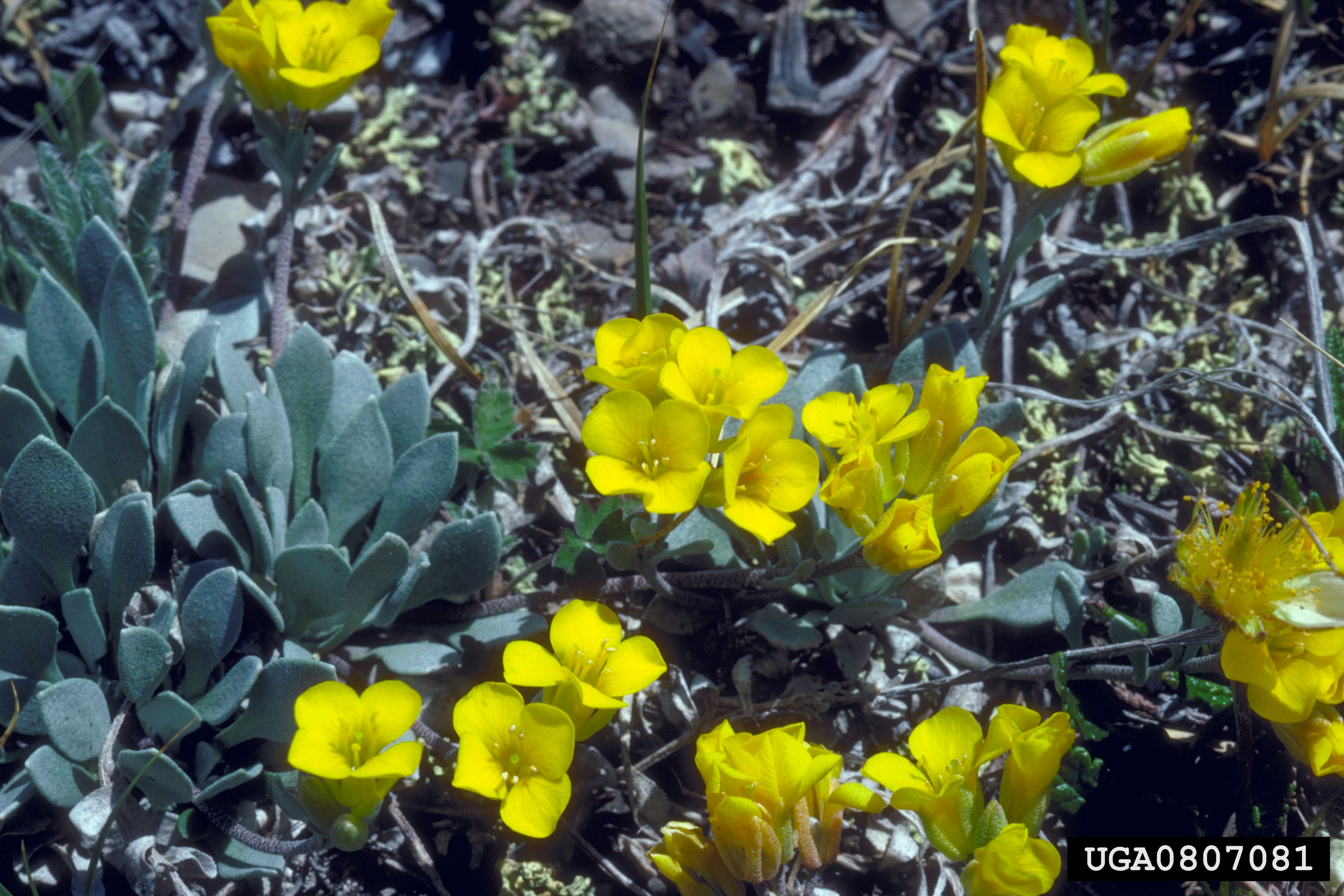

Conservation status
- Imperiled (NatureServe)

Scientific classification
- Kingdom: Plantae
- Clade: Tracheophytes
- Clade: Angiosperms
- Clade: Eudicots
- Clade: Rosids
- Order: Brassicales
- Family: Brassicaceae
- Genus: Physaria
- Species: P. bellii

Binomial name
- Physaria bellii G.A.Mulligan

= Physaria bellii =

Species of flowering plant

Physaria bellii is a species of flowering plant in the family Brassicaceae known by the common names Bell's twinpod and Front Range twinpod. It is endemic to Colorado in the United States.

This perennial herb produces decumbent or prostrate stems from a caudex. The plant is covered in hairs, making it silvery. The basal leaves are toothed and the leaves along the stems are smooth on the edges. The inflorescence is a raceme of flowers with yellow petals and yellowish sepals. The fruit is a leathery pod reaching nearly a centimeter in length. Flowering occurs in May and June.

This plant grows on the Front Range in Colorado. It grows on the Niobrara, Pierre, Fountain, Ingleside, and Lykins Formations. The soils are limestone, limestone shale, or red sandstone. The habitat is shrubland dominated by Rhus trilobata and Cercocarpus montanus.

The plant is rare in general but locally abundant. Potential threats to the species include hybridization with Physaria vitulifera, a more widespread plant, limestone mining, road construction and maintenance, and introduced species of plants. The main threat is residential development.
