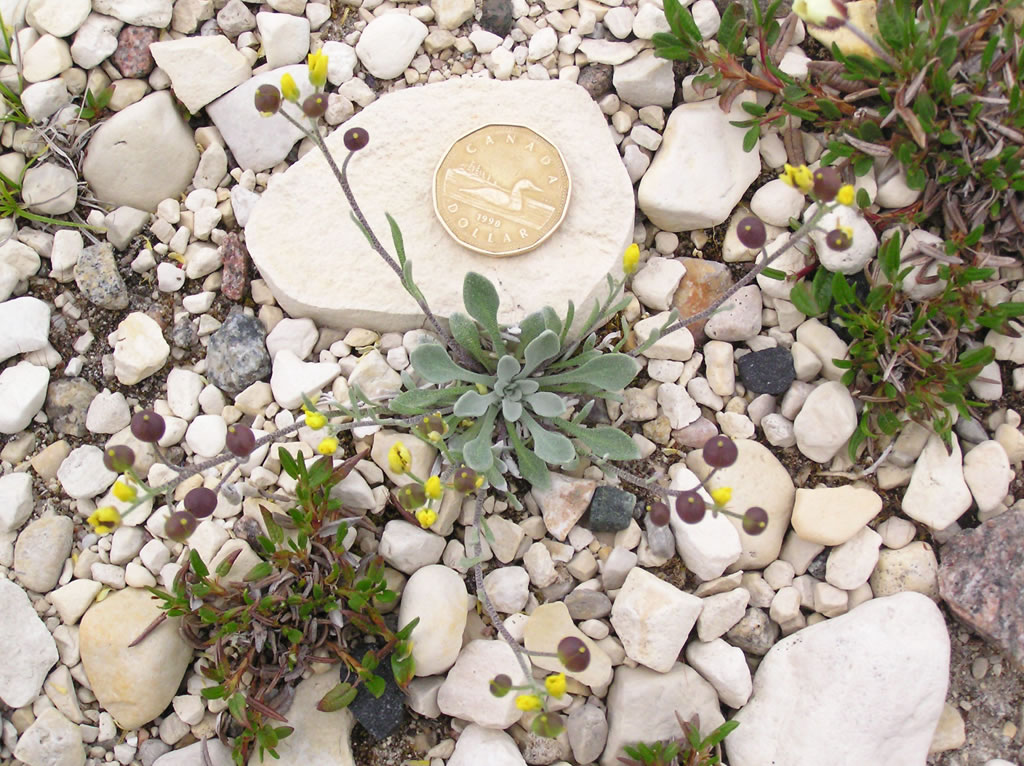

Scientific classification
- Kingdom: Plantae
- Clade: Tracheophytes
- Clade: Angiosperms
- Clade: Eudicots
- Clade: Rosids
- Order: Brassicales
- Family: Brassicaceae
- Genus: Physaria
- Species: P. arctica

Binomial name
- Physaria arctica (Wormsk. ex Hornem.) O'Kane & Al-Shehbaz

Synonyms
- Alyssum arcticum Wormsk. ex Hornem. (1816) (basionym); Lesquerella arctica (Wormsk. ex Hornem.) S.Watson; Lesquerella purshii (S.Watson) Fernald; Vesicaria arctica (Wormsk. ex Hornem.) Richardson; Vesicaria andicola Gillies ex Hook. & Arn.; Vesicaria leiocarpa (Trautv.) N.Busch

= Physaria arctica =

Species of flowering plant

Physaria arctica is a perennial flowering herb in the family Brassicaceae, known by the common name arctic bladderpod.

== Description ==
Plants are 6–12 cm high with a short taproot and woody stem-base. Basal leaves, 2–6 cm and arranged in a rosette predominate, and are obovate to oblanceolate, while cauline leaves, sessile or shortly petiolate, are oblanceolate or lingulate and 0.5-1.5 cm. Inflorescences are loosely racemose, with flower stalks ascending or erect and 5–20 mm. There are 3-8 radially symmetrical flowers per inflorescence, and the petals are spaulate, 5-6mm, with blades that narrow gradually to the claw.

== Distribution ==
Physaria arctica ranges across much of the subarctic biome in North America, as well as the Russian Far East, and east Siberia. It is the only member of the genus known to occur in Asia. In North America it is known from Alaska, Alberta, British Columbia, Greenland, Labrador, Manitoba, Newfoundland, Northwest Territories, Nunavut, Québec, and Yukon.

== Habitat ==
Physaria arctica grows in sand and gravel from calcareous bedrock, river bars and terraces, cliff ledges, scree and talus slopes.
