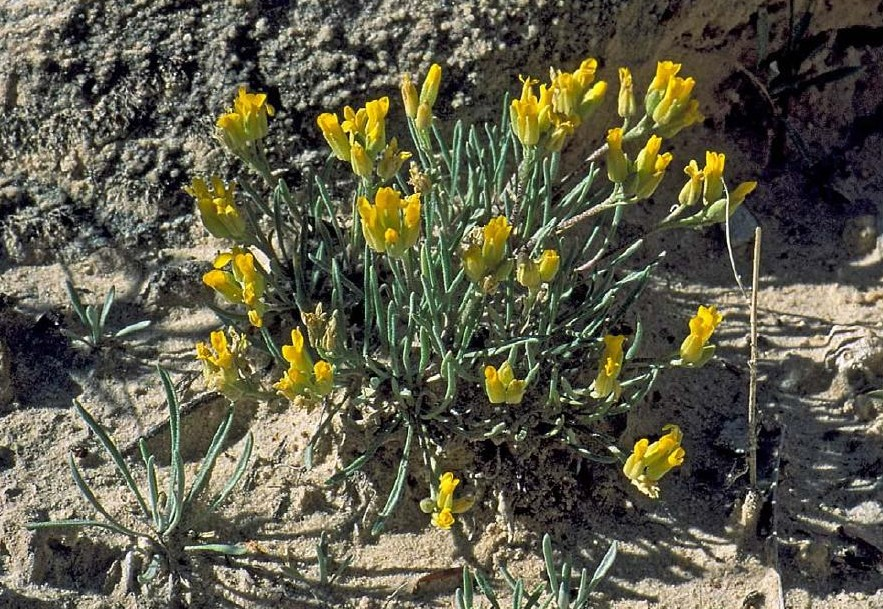

Conservation status
- Vulnerable (NatureServe)

Scientific classification
- Kingdom: Plantae
- Clade: Tracheophytes
- Clade: Angiosperms
- Clade: Eudicots
- Clade: Rosids
- Order: Brassicales
- Family: Brassicaceae
- Genus: Physaria
- Species: P. parvula

Binomial name
- Physaria parvula (Greene) O'Kane & Al-Shehbaz

Synonyms
- Lesquerella parvula Greene

= Physaria parvula =

Species of flowering plant

Physaria parvula (syn. Lesquerella parvula) is a species of flowering plant in the family Brassicaceae known by the common name pygmy bladderpod. It is native to the Western United States, where it can be found in Colorado, Utah, and Wyoming.

This plant is a tuft-forming perennial herb. It is gray-green in color due to a coating of branching hairs. Stems up to 15 centimeters tall arise from a caudex buried just underground. The leaves are linear in shape and measure 1 to 3 centimeters in length. The narrow leaves make the plant distinctive among the Physaria species growing in the area. The flowers have four clawed yellow petals each about half a centimeter long.

This plant grows in open areas in sagebrush and mountain shrub ecosystems. It may grow in areas with few or no other plants, such as areas that are windswept and harsh.
