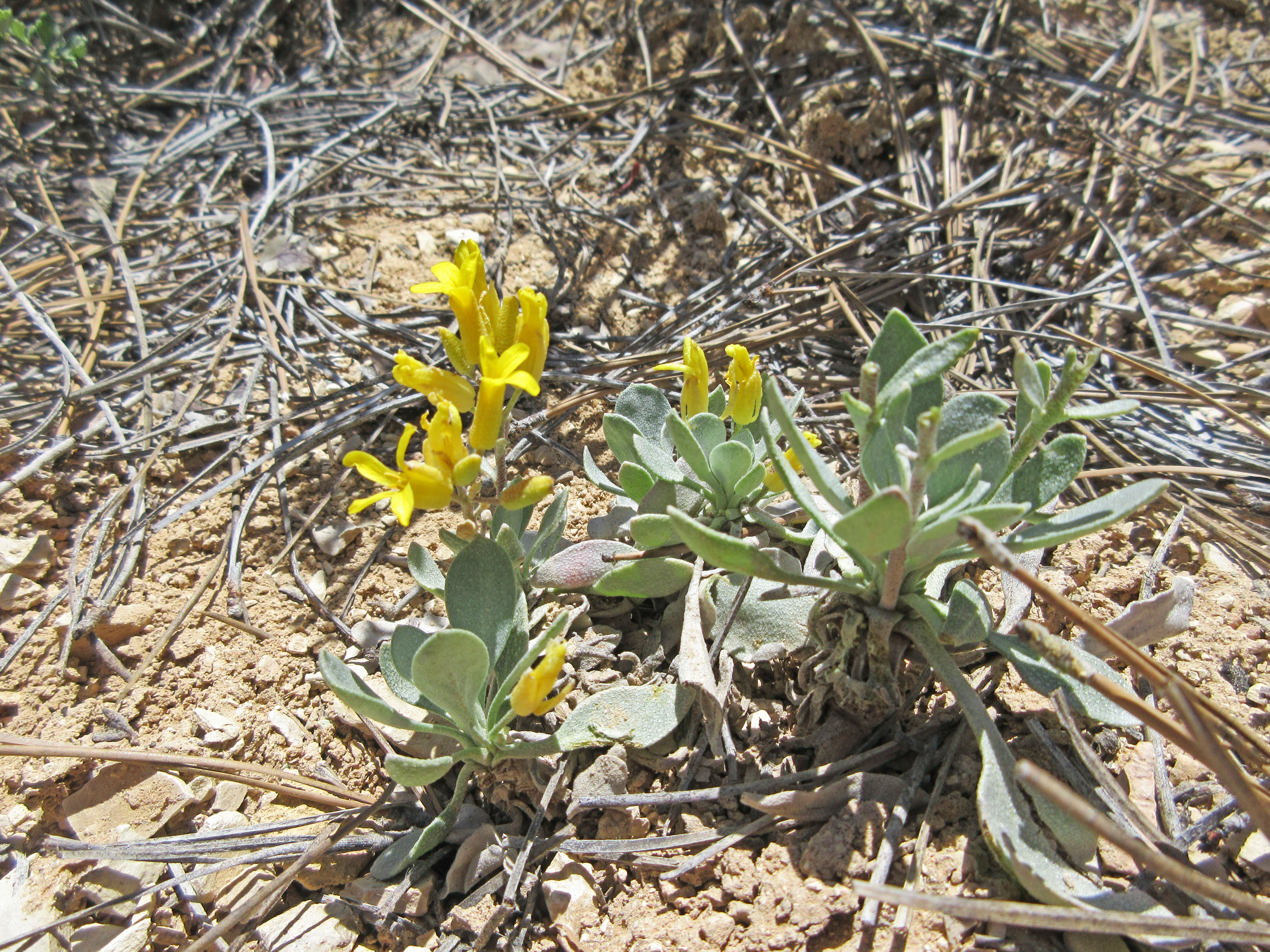

Scientific classification
- Kingdom: Plantae
- Clade: Embryophytes
- Clade: Tracheophytes
- Clade: Angiosperms
- Clade: Eudicots
- Clade: Rosids
- Order: Brassicales
- Family: Brassicaceae
- Genus: Physaria
- Species: P. lepidota

Binomial name
- Physaria lepidota Rollins

Synonyms
- (for subsp. membranacea): Physaria chambersii var. membranacea Rollins; Physaria lepidota var. membranacea (Rollins) Rollins

= Physaria lepidota =

Species of flowering plant

Physaria lepidota, the Kane County twinpod, is a plant species endemic to Utah. It is known only from Kane, Washington, and Garfield Counties in the southern part of the state. It grows on rocky slopes and outcrops, and sometimes in disturbed areas.

Physaria lepidota is a perennial herb with most of the above-ground parts covered with a silvery pubescence. Stems branch at the base but rarely above, sometimes reaching a height of 20 cm (8 inches). Flowers are yellow, born in a dense raceme. Fruits are highly inflated, up to 20 mm (0.8 inches) across with purplish papery walls.

== Subspecies ==
Despite the limited range of the species, two subspecies are generally recognized, differing in the shapes of the fruits and of the hairs in the pubescence:

Physaria lepidota subsp. lepidota

and

Physaria lepidota subsp. membranacea

The two subspecies also differ in chromosome number (2n=16 for subsp. lepidota, 2n=8 for subsp. membranacea).
