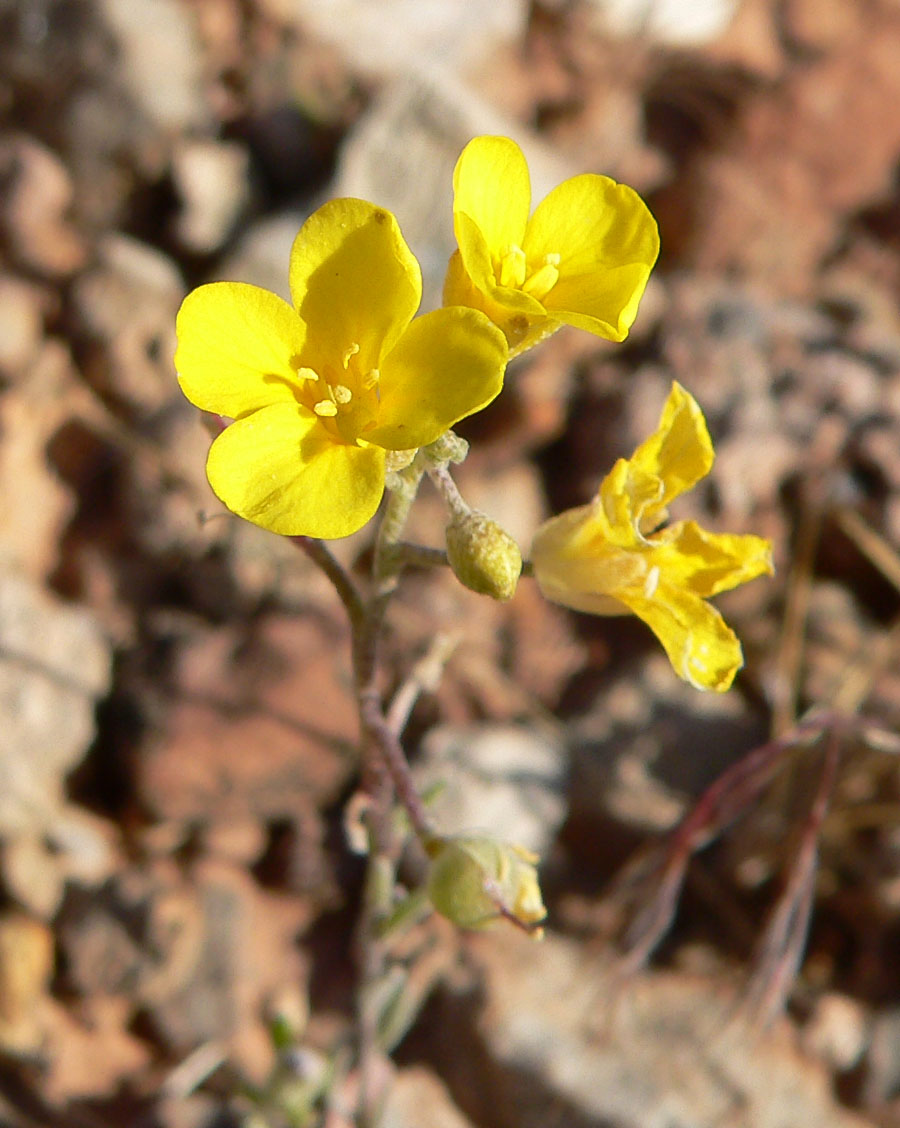
- Physaria tenella, formerly "Lesquerella tenella"

Scientific classification
- Kingdom: Plantae
- Clade: Tracheophytes
- Clade: Angiosperms
- Clade: Eudicots
- Clade: Rosids
- Order: Brassicales
- Family: Brassicaceae
- Genus: Lesquerella; S. Watson

Species
- None

= Lesquerella =

Genus of flowering plants

Lesquerella is the former name of a genus of flowering plants in the family Brassicaceae. Recent work has shown that Lesquerella is indistinct from the genus Physaria and both genera have been united under Physaria. In addition, the former Lesquerella of the southeastern United States have been moved to the genus Paysonia since 2002. The genus Lesquerella is now no longer applied to any species and is considered defunct.

The genus is named in honor of Leo Lesquereux, 1805–1889, Swiss and American botanist.
