= Physaria hemiphysaria =

Conservation status
- Apparently Secure (NatureServe)

Scientific classification
- Kingdom: Plantae
- Clade: Tracheophytes
- Clade: Angiosperms
- Clade: Eudicots
- Clade: Rosids
- Order: Brassicales
- Family: Brassicaceae
- Genus: Physaria
- Species: P. hemiphysaria

Binomial name
- Physaria hemiphysaria (Maguire) O'Kane & Al-Shehbaz

Synonyms
- Lesquerella hemiphysaria

Species of flowering plant

Physaria hemiphysaria (formerly Lesquerella hemiphysaria) is a species of flowering plant in the mustard family known by the common names Intermountain bladderpod and skyline bladderpod. It is endemic to Utah in the United States, where it grows on rocky ridges and outcrops of sandstone, shale, clay, and sand.

This perennial herb produces stout, decumbent stems up to 10 or 20 centimeters long from a caudex. The leaves are up to 5.5 centimeters long, the upper ones smaller. The basal leaves may have toothed edges and the upper ones are smooth-edged. The inflorescence is a raceme of flowers with narrow yellow petals. The fruit is a silique a few millimeters long.

There are two subspecies of this plant. The ssp. hemiphysaria occurs on the Wasatch Plateau of Utah, while ssp. lucens (Tavaputs bladderpod or Range Creek bladderpod) is limited to the West Tavaputs Plateau.
