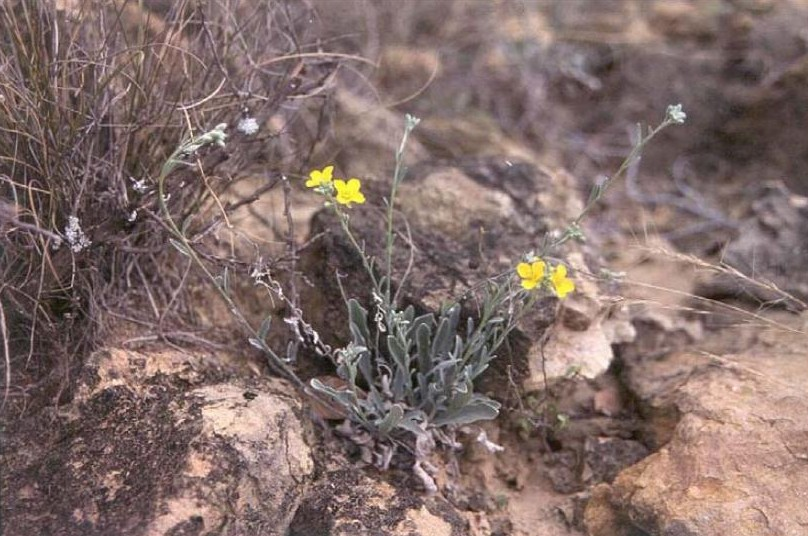

Conservation status
- Critically Imperiled (NatureServe)

Scientific classification
- Kingdom: Plantae
- Clade: Tracheophytes
- Clade: Angiosperms
- Clade: Eudicots
- Clade: Rosids
- Order: Brassicales
- Family: Brassicaceae
- Genus: Physaria
- Species: P. thamnophila

Binomial name
- Physaria thamnophila (Rollins & E.A.Shaw) O'Kane & Al-Shehbaz

Synonyms
- Lesquerella thamnophila

= Physaria thamnophila =

Species of flowering plant

Physaria thamnophila (syn. Lesquerella thamnophila) is a rare species of flowering plant in the mustard family known by the common name Zapata bladderpod. It is native to Texas in the United States, where it is known from Zapata and Starr Counties. The plant is threatened by the loss and degradation of its habitat. It is federally listed as an endangered species.

This is a perennial herb producing one or more spreading stems from a woody base. The stems grow to 80 centimeters in maximum length. The herbage is silvery in color due to a coat of branching hairs. The leaves are oval to lance-shaped and smooth to faintly toothed on the edges, the lowest leaves reaching 12 centimeters long. The inflorescence is a raceme of yellow flowers. Blooming can occur through September whenever there is enough moisture. The population size can also increase rapidly after a significant amount of rainfall.

This plant grows in desert shrublands above the Rio Grande floodplain in southern Texas. The substrate is calcareous clay and sandstone in geologic formations that contain an abundance of fossils. The terrain is sparsely covered by thorny shrubs and cacti, with the plant community dominated by Leucophyllum frutescens and Acacia berlandieri. Other plants in the habitat include Acacia rigidula (blackbrush acacia), Prosopis spp. (mesquite), Celtis pallida (granjeno), Yucca treculeana (Spanish dagger), Zizyphus obtusifolia (lotebush), and Guaiacum angustifolium (guayacan). Some shrubs may serve as nurse plants to the bladderpod, which grows in their shade and may benefit from their protection from soil erosion and herbivory by animals.

This plant was thought to be limited to Zapata and Starr Counties in Texas, but there has been a documented population south of the border in Tamaulipas and the plant may occur in Webb County, Texas. There are approximately eleven populations known, but only about seven of these still exist. During dry spells the populations can shrink to low numbers, but flourish again when rain occurs.

The main threat to the species is habitat destruction and modification. Non-native grass species have been introduced to the region to make pastures for grazing. Some areas have then become overgrazed. The landscape has been cleared and developed and associated infrastructure has been installed, including highways and transmission lines. There is active petroleum exploration occurring in the area.
