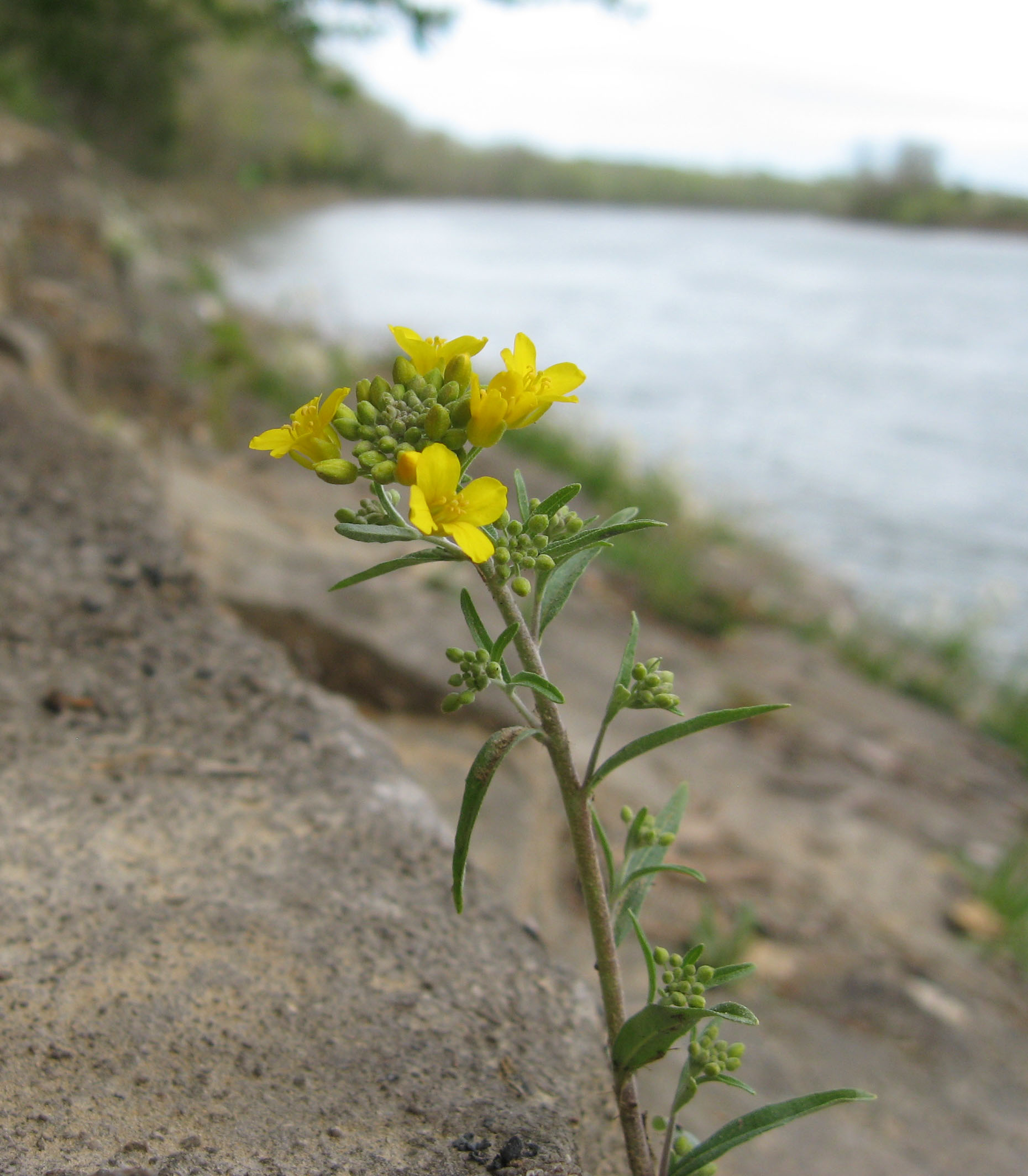

Conservation status
- Imperiled (NatureServe)

Scientific classification
- Kingdom: Plantae
- Clade: Tracheophytes
- Clade: Angiosperms
- Clade: Eudicots
- Clade: Rosids
- Order: Brassicales
- Family: Brassicaceae
- Genus: Physaria
- Species: P. globosa

Binomial name
- Physaria globosa (Desv.) O’Kane & Al-Shehbaz

Synonyms
- Alyssum globosum Alyssum shortii Lesquerella globosa Vesicaria globosa

= Physaria globosa =

Species of flowering plant

Physaria globosa is a rare flowering plant in the mustard family commonly known as globe bladderpod, Short's bladderpod, and Lesquereux's mustard. It is endemic to the United States, where it is limited to Indiana, Kentucky, and Tennessee. It is a rare species throughout its range and in 2014 the U.S. Fish and Wildlife Service issued a final rule protecting it under the Endangered Species Act.

== Description ==
Physaria globosa is a small plant covered with dense hairs giving it a grayish appearance. It produces yellow flowers in the spring, and its fruit is globe-shaped. Its preferred habitat is dry limestone cliffs, barrens, cedar glades, steep wooded slopes, and talus areas. Many sites where it is found are on roadsides, where it can be threatened by road construction and maintenance activities such as mowing, herbicide usage, and road widening or repaving.

== Conservation ==
The population fluctuates year to year, but on average there are about 2000 living plants at any one time, divided among 33 known locations. Threats include forms of habitat degradation and destruction, including road construction and grading, mowing, dumping, herbicides, alteration of waterways, livestock damage, and invasive species of plants such as Japanese honeysuckle, garlic mustard, alsike clover, sweet clover, meadow fescue, and multiflora rose.

All populations are considered vulnerable to extirpation.
