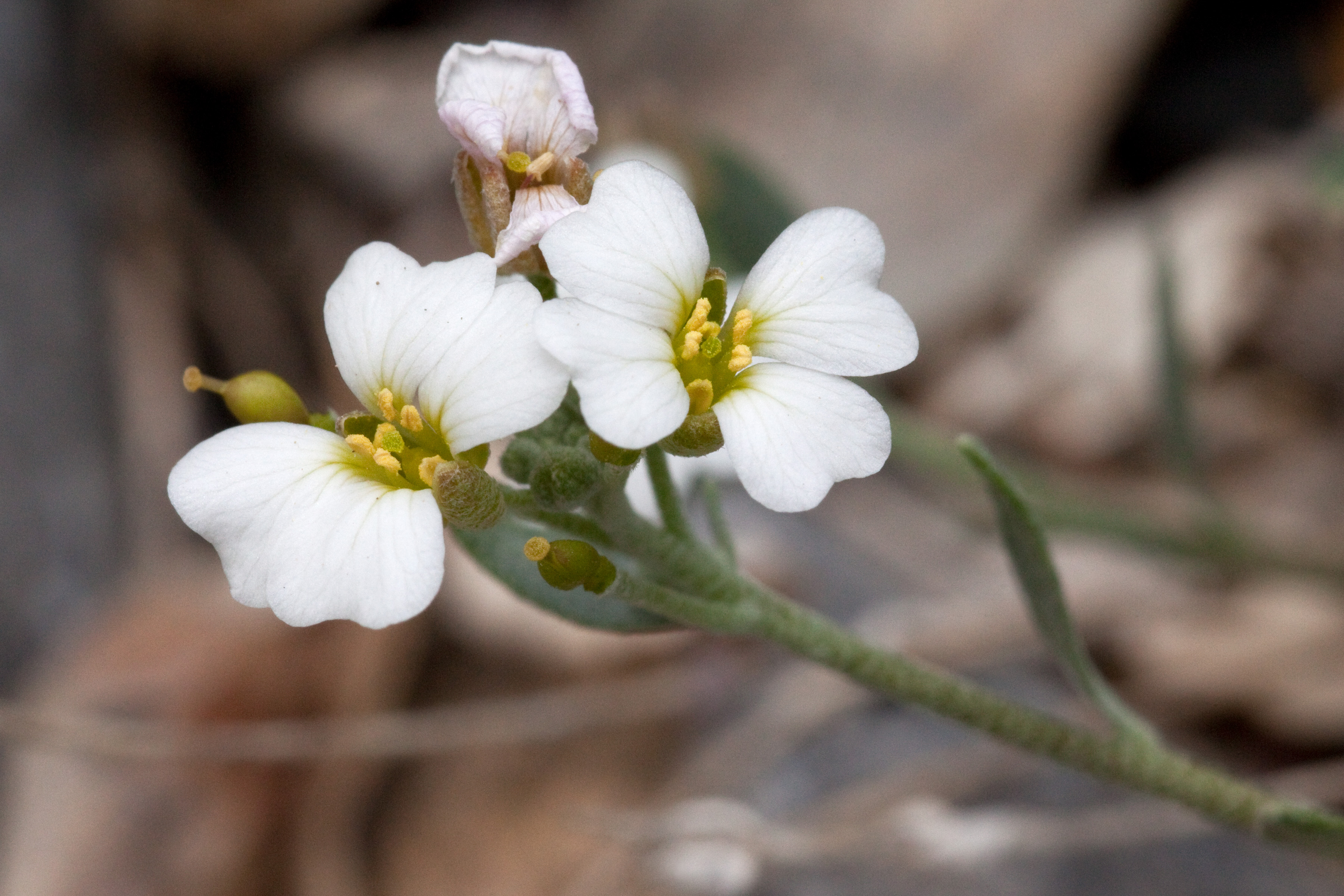
- Found in the Sonoran Desert

Scientific classification
- Kingdom: Plantae
- Clade: Tracheophytes
- Clade: Angiosperms
- Clade: Eudicots
- Clade: Rosids
- Order: Brassicales
- Family: Brassicaceae
- Genus: Physaria
- Species: P. purpurea

Binomial name
- Physaria purpurea (A.Gray) O'Kane & Al-Shehbaz

= Physaria purpurea =

Species of flowering plant

Physaria purpurea, the western white bladderpod or rose bladderpod, is a perennial plant in the family Brassicaceae found in the Sonoran Desert.
