= Physaria rollinsii =

Conservation status
- Imperiled (NatureServe)

Scientific classification
- Kingdom: Plantae
- Clade: Tracheophytes
- Clade: Angiosperms
- Clade: Eudicots
- Clade: Rosids
- Order: Brassicales
- Family: Brassicaceae
- Genus: Physaria
- Species: P. rollinsii

Binomial name
- Physaria rollinsii G.A.Mulligan

Species of flowering plant

Physaria rollinsii, also known as Rollins' twinpod, is a species of flowering plant in the family Brassicaceae. It is endemic to the Gunnison River Basin in Colorado in the United States, where it occurs in Gunnison and Saguache counties.

== Description ==
These perennial forbs produce numerous decumbent unbranched stems from their caudex, and can grow to a diameter of 1 decimeter. The plants appear a pale green due to the stellate 6-8 rayed trichomes covering the leaves and stems. Their basal leaves are oblanceolate to triangular with 1-2 broad teeth. The leaves are small, growing to around 1–3.5 cm long, and 2–10 mm wide, and they are oblanceolate to triangular in shape. Their inflorescences are a raceme congested with small (8–10 mm) yellow flowers. Each flower turns into a reddish nearly orbicular, didymous fruit, from which it earns the name 'twinpod'. Their chromosome count is 2n=8.

== Distribution and habitat ==
Physaria rollinsii is restricted to the Gunnison River Basin in Colorado where it can be found growing in sagebrush steppe on dry open hillsides and steep rocky ridges. They can be found on a variety of geologies within the Gunnison Basin, and are known from granitic talus, limestone chiprock, and clay banks. Within the basin they are found between elevations of 7,500–8,700 ft (2,300–2,700 m), and are confined to an area of 1,243 km^{2} (480 sq mi).

== Threats ==
This species is listed as imperiled due to threats from livestock, recreation and invasive species, with Cheatgrass (Bromus tectorum) being a major competitor for habitat. Additionally its small range and elevation gradient make the species incredibly susceptible to climate change.

== Ecology ==
The species primarily occurs among species typical of sagebrush steppe including Artemisia tridentata, Cercocarpus montanus, Chrysothamnus depressus, Opuntia fragilis, Phlox longifolia, and Penstemon caespitosus. Plants can be seen flowering and fruiting from May to June.
