= Physaria parviflora =

Conservation status
- Imperiled (NatureServe)

Scientific classification
- Kingdom: Plantae
- Clade: Embryophytes
- Clade: Tracheophytes
- Clade: Spermatophytes
- Clade: Angiosperms
- Clade: Eudicots
- Clade: Rosids
- Order: Brassicales
- Family: Brassicaceae
- Genus: Physaria
- Species: P. parviflora

Binomial name
- Physaria parviflora (Rollins) O'Kane & Al-Shehbaz

Synonyms
- Lesquerella parviflora

Species of flowering plant

Physaria parviflora (syn. Lesquerella parviflora) is a species of flowering plant in the family Brassicaceae known by the common names Piceance bladderpod and frosty bladderpod. It is endemic to Colorado in the United States, where it occurs in Garfield, Mesa, and Rio Blanco Counties.

This perennial herb is coated thickly in branching hairs, appearing silvery. It produces several stems that spread out along the ground, reaching lengths of 10 to 30 centimeters. There is a clump of basal leaves and some leaves along the stems. The inflorescence is a raceme of flowers with yellow petals and sepals. The fruit is a hanging silicle containing flat seeds.

This plant grows on shale barrens in the Piceance Basin of Colorado. Its substrate originates from the Parachute Creek Member of the Green River Formation. The habitat is pinyon-juniper woodland, and associated plant species include Pinus edulis, Juniperus osteosperma, Astragalus lutosus, Galium coloradense, Oryzopsis hymenoides, and buckwheats, thistles, and penstemons.

There are about 31 known populations of this plant. It is threatened by oil shale mining in its habitat. Other threats include off-road vehicles and overgrazing.
