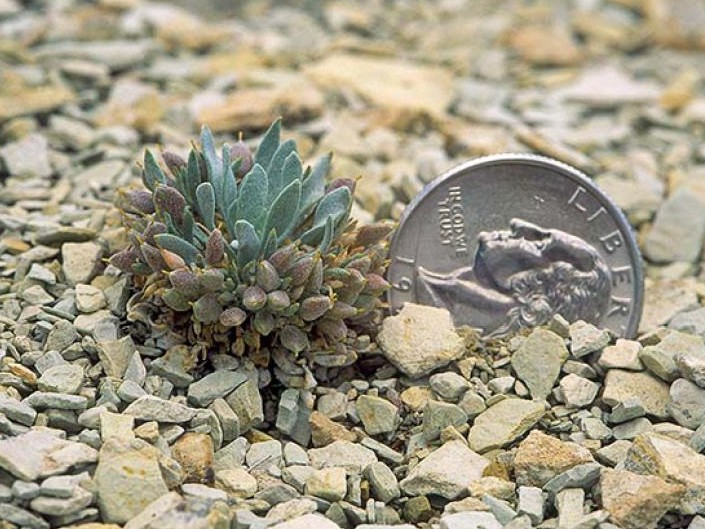

Conservation status
- Critically Imperiled (NatureServe)

Scientific classification
- Kingdom: Plantae
- Clade: Embryophytes
- Clade: Tracheophytes
- Clade: Spermatophytes
- Clade: Angiosperms
- Clade: Eudicots
- Clade: Rosids
- Order: Brassicales
- Family: Brassicaceae
- Genus: Physaria
- Species: P. congesta

Binomial name
- Physaria congesta (Rollins) O'Kane & Al-Shehbaz

Synonyms
- Lesquerella congesta

= Physaria congesta =

Species of flowering plant

Physaria congesta (syn. Lesquerella congesta) is a rare species of flowering plant in the mustard family known by the common name Dudley Bluffs bladderpod. It is endemic to western Colorado in the United States, where it is known only from seven occurrences in Rio Blanco County. It is federally listed as a threatened species.

This is a petite perennial herb taking the form of a small, compact mound no more than about 2 centimeters tall. A short stem arises from a hairy caudex that remains buried in the soil. This is attached to a long, slender taproot. The leaves are linear or lance-shaped and measure up to 1.5 centimeters in length. They are coated in hairs, giving them a gray or silver color. The inflorescence is a raceme of flowers. It is so short it generally lies within the densely packed leaves. The flowers have bright yellow petals each about half a centimeter long. The fruit is a silique about the same length. The flowers are pollinated by the bee Andrena hicksii and other Andrena species.

This plant grows on barren outcrops of rock in the notoriously petroleum-rich Piceance Basin. The substrate is pale white in color, and the tiny, gray-colored plant is nearly invisible until it blooms in yellow flowers. The flat, open ground in the area is a section of the Green River Formation exposed when rivers and creeks cut through the rock. The rock covers a vast network of oil shale. About 90% of the plant's habitat is on land overseen by the Bureau of Land Management. The BLM is establishing a plan to balance the needs of the plant and other organisms in the habitat with the proposed oil and gas exploration in the immediate area. The rock is also mined for deposits of nahcolite and dawsonite, two types of sodium minerals.

There are about 10,000 individual plants estimated to exist, all in an area of 88 square kilometers in one Colorado county. The plant is directly threatened by petroleum exploration activities. The effects of exploration on the species are not yet clear. While it is threatened, the species in general currently has a high probability of survival and does not yet meet the criteria for uplisting to endangered species status.

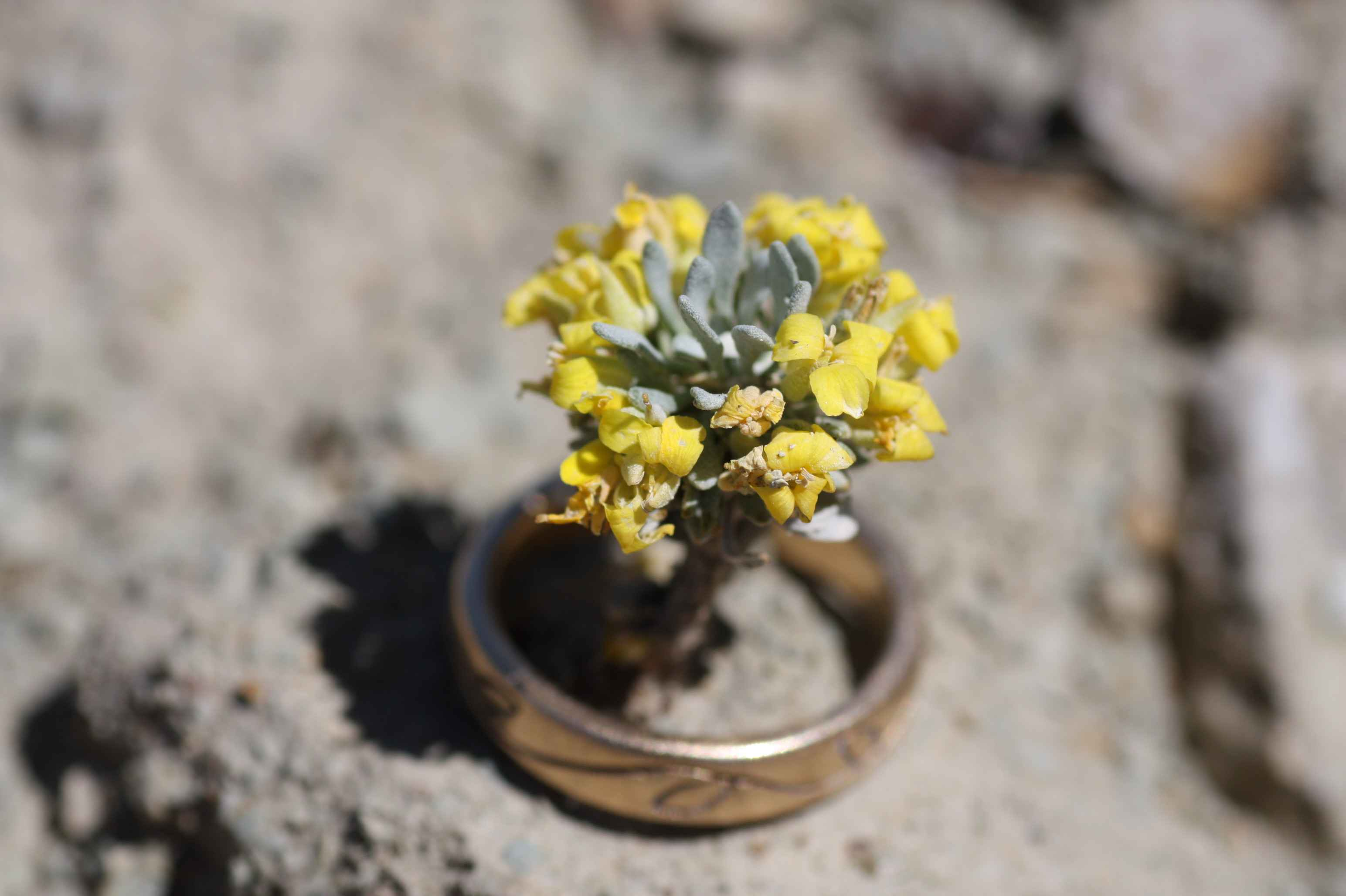
Flowering specimen with ring for scale

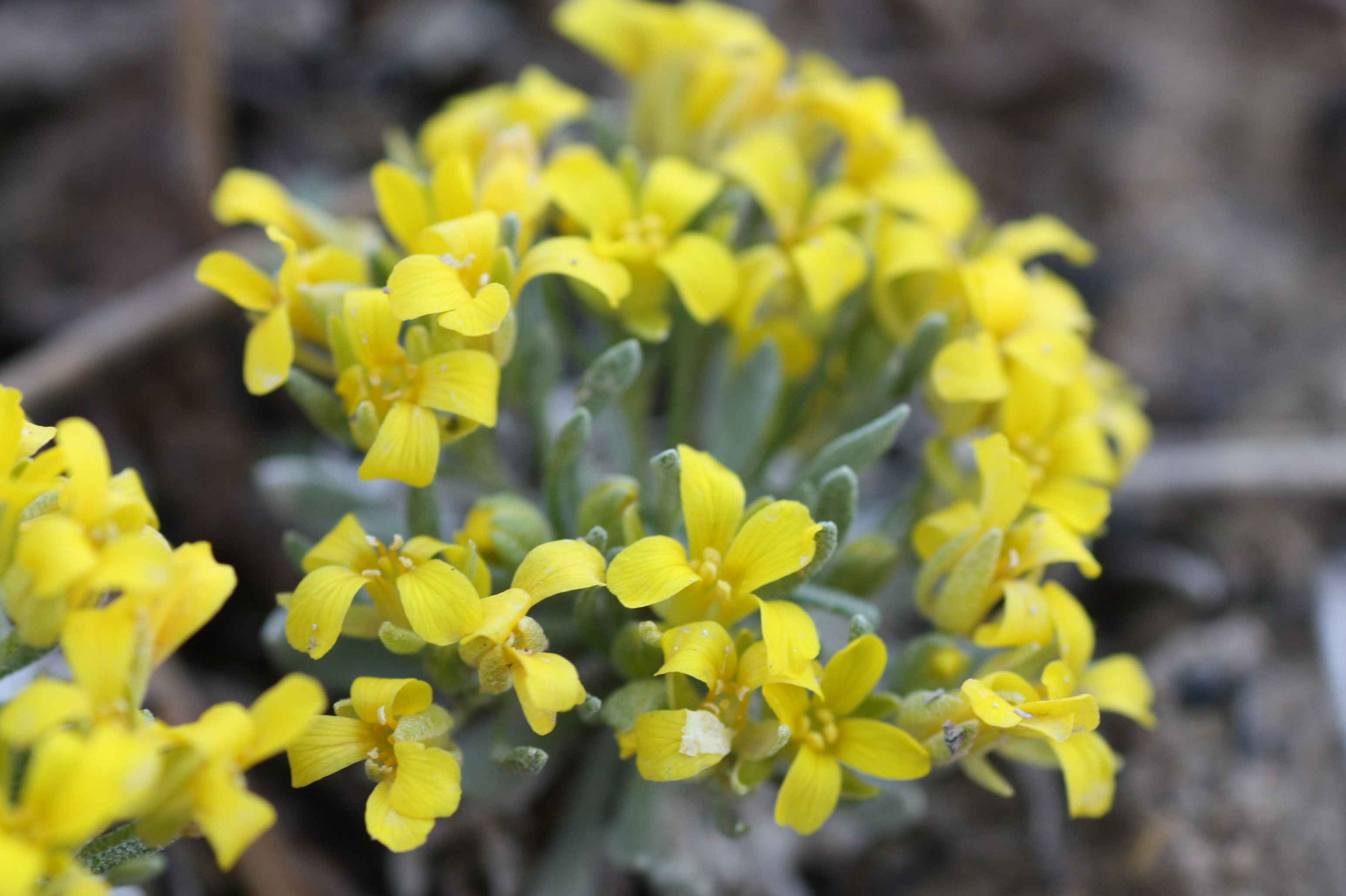
Inflorescence detail

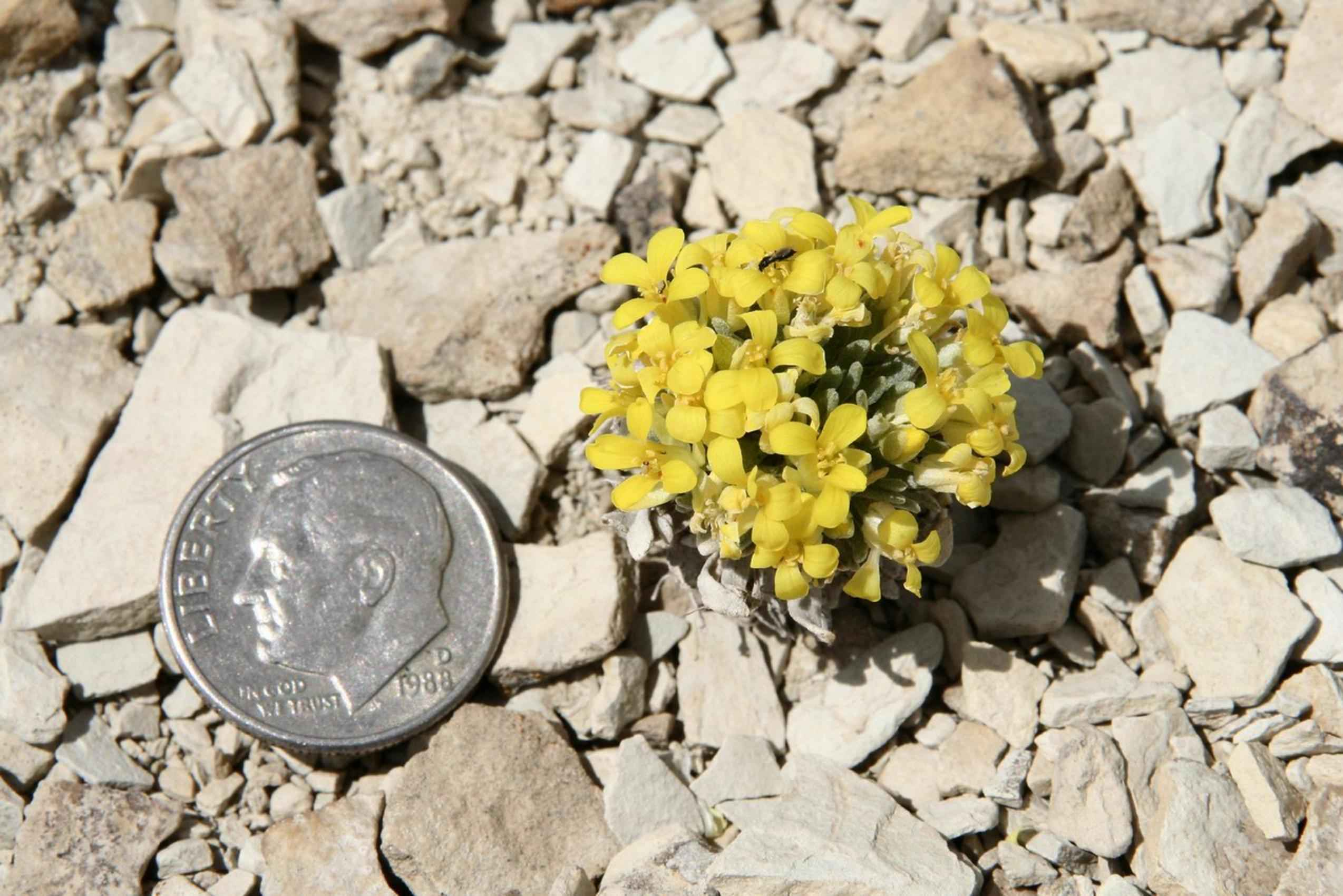
Flowering bladderpod juxtaposed to dime
