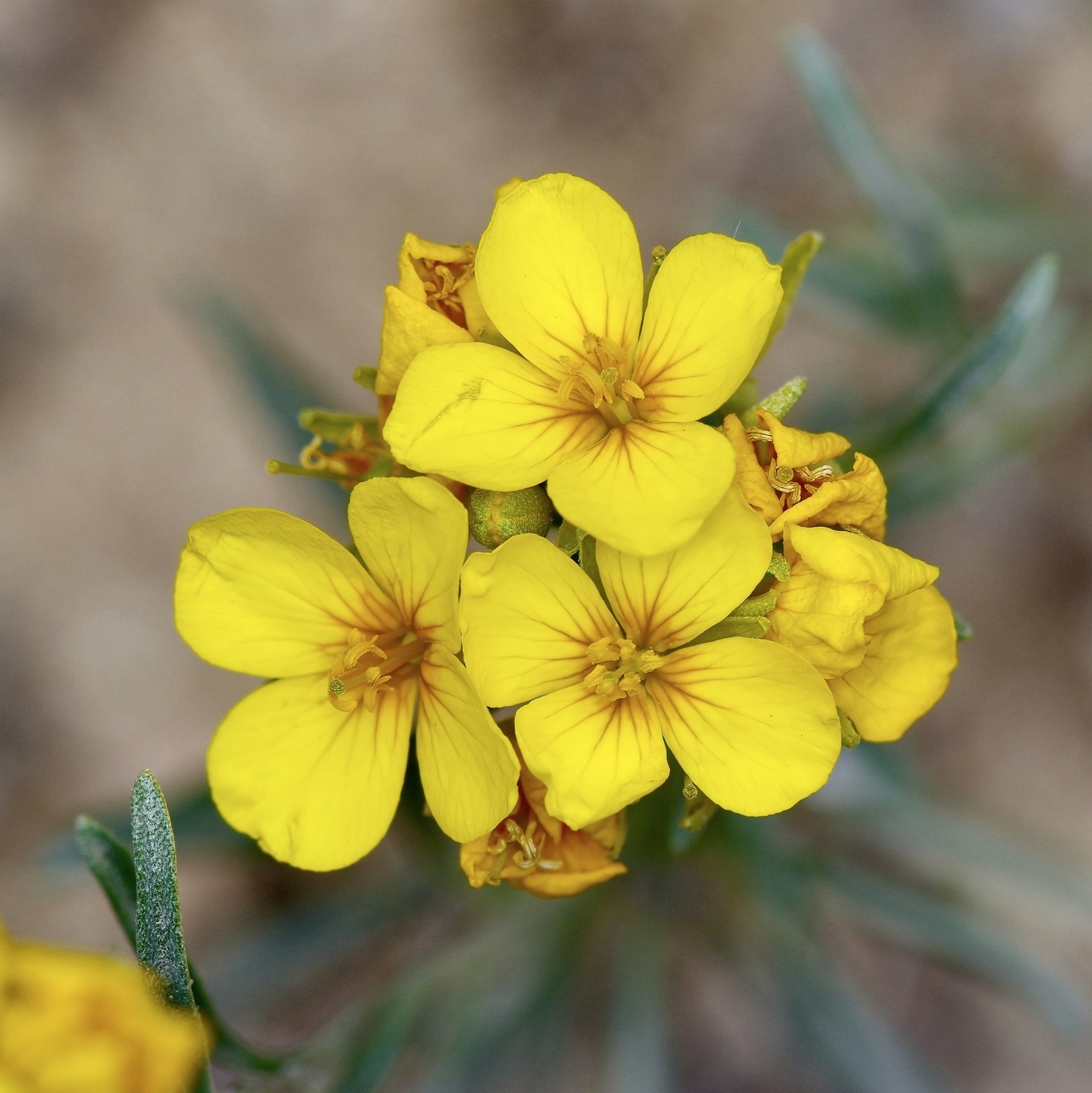
- Physaria fendleri flowers Hill Country State Natural Area, Bandera County, Texas

Conservation status
- Secure (NatureServe)

Scientific classification
- Kingdom: Plantae
- Clade: Tracheophytes
- Clade: Angiosperms
- Clade: Eudicots
- Clade: Rosids
- Order: Brassicales
- Family: Brassicaceae
- Genus: Physaria
- Species: P. fendleri

Binomial name
- Physaria fendleri (A.Gray) O’Kane & Al-Shehbaz

= Physaria fendleri =

Species of flowering plant

Physaria fendleri is a species of flowering plant in the family Brassicaceae known by several common names, including Fendler's bladderpod, popweed, and lesquerella.

== Distribution ==
The plant is native to the Southwestern United States and northern Mexico.

It is also cultivated in these regions, as it does best in their climates and in local calcareous soils. It requires less irrigation than many other crops, due to its adaptation to life in an arid region.

== Description ==
Physaria fendleri is a perennial plant in natural habitats. It is cultivated as a winter annual.

It produces hairless capsules called siliques which contain 6 to 25 seeds each.

== Uses ==
The species is best known as the richest source of bladderpod oil. Most Physaria species contain the hydroxy acid, lesquerolic acid in their oil with a seed oil content of ~24%. This oil is useful as a replacement for castor oil in some applications due to its ability to form estolides. If the plant becomes more widely cultivated and breeding and refinement techniques are improved, the oil could be used in a number of industries, including cosmetics, coatings, plastics, and lubricants. One obstacle to use is the oil's reddish-brown color, which makes it less valuable for certain applications than the colorless or pale yellow castor oil. Breeding may reduce the pigment load of the plant's oils over time. Breeding may also favor other characteristics in this species, such as its capacity for cultivation in other climates, male sterility to allow better control of pollination, and tolerance for a wider array of soil types.

The plant has uses beyond its oil. The seed coat of P. fendleri also contains a useful natural gum which might be viable as a food additive similar to xanthan gum. The mash is high in protein, and has a similar proportion of various amino acids to the soybean. It may prove to be a good animal fodder.
