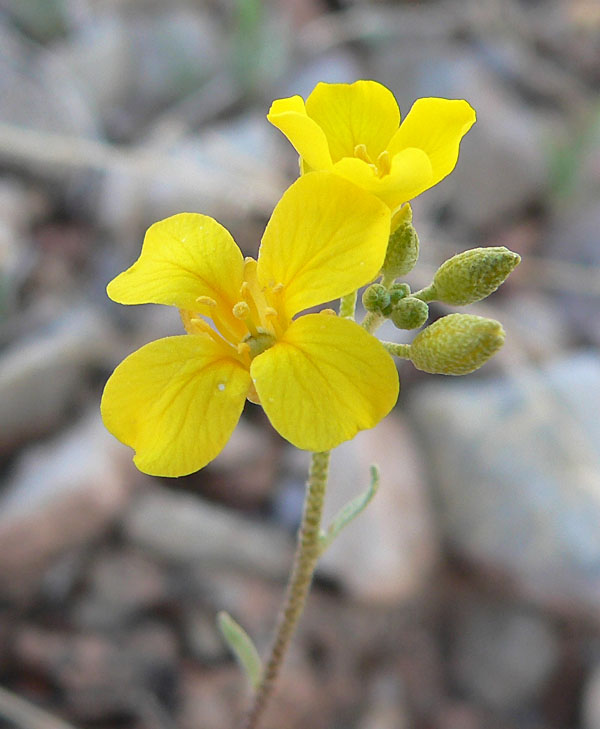

Scientific classification
- Kingdom: Plantae
- Clade: Tracheophytes
- Clade: Angiosperms
- Clade: Eudicots
- Clade: Rosids
- Order: Brassicales
- Family: Brassicaceae
- Genus: Physaria
- Species: P. tenella

Binomial name
- Physaria tenella (A.Nelson) O'Kane & Al-Shehbaz

= Physaria tenella =

Species of flowering plant

Physaria tenella is a species of flowering plant in the family Brassicaceae known by the common names Moapa bladderpod and slender bladderpod. It is native to western North America from Utah to Sonora, where it grows mainly in desert habitat. This is an annual herb producing several hairy multibranched erect to spreading stems sometimes exceeding half a meter long. The basal leaves are up to 6.5 centimeters long and sometimes toothed, and there are smaller leaves higher on the stem. The inflorescence is a raceme of flowers at the tip of the stem. The mustardlike flower has four orange to bright yellow petals each up to a centimeter long. The fruit is a plump, hairy, rounded capsule containing flat orange seeds.
