= Physaria navajoensis =

Scientific classification
- Kingdom: Plantae
- Clade: Tracheophytes
- Clade: Angiosperms
- Clade: Eudicots
- Clade: Rosids
- Order: Brassicales
- Family: Brassicaceae
- Genus: Physaria
- Species: P. navajoensis

Binomial name
- Physaria navajoensis (O'Kane) O'Kane & Al-Shehbaz

Synonyms
- Lesquerella navajoensis (O'Kane)

Species of flowering plant

Physaria navajoensis, the Navajo twinpod or Navajo bladderpod, is a plant species native the US states of Arizona, Utah, and New Mexico. It is known from only one county in Arizona (Apache), one in Utah (Kane) and two counties in New Mexico (San Juan and McKinley). Much of the plant's range is on land of the Navajo Nation. The plant occurs in open, sunny locations at elevations of 2200–2400 m.

Physaria navajoensis is a perennial herb with a woody caudex. Much of the shoot is covered with silvery-gray branched hairs. Stems branch mostly at the base. Leaves are narrow, up to 15 mm long. Flowers are yellow with an orange center, up to 15 mm across, borne in a raceme. Fruits are egg-shaped, about 4 mm in diameter.
