= Physaria intermedia =

Scientific classification
- Kingdom: Plantae
- Clade: Tracheophytes
- Clade: Angiosperms
- Clade: Eudicots
- Clade: Rosids
- Order: Brassicales
- Family: Brassicaceae
- Genus: Physaria
- Species: P. intermedia

Binomial name
- Physaria intermedia (S.Watson) O'Kane & Al-Shehbaz

Species of bladder pod

Physaria intermedia is a rare species of bladder pod in the cabbage family, Brassicaceae.

== Range ==
1500–2100 m; endemic to northeast-northcentral New Mexico.

== Ecology ==
Physaria intermedia is an example of the adaptation of Physaria species to dry or alpine habitats.

== Taxonomy ==
DNA analysis and resulting phylogenetic trees indicate that historical classifications were in error. The closely related Physaria fallax (nom nudum) represents disjunct populations of Physaria in southwest New Mexico, Arizona and southern Utah.
