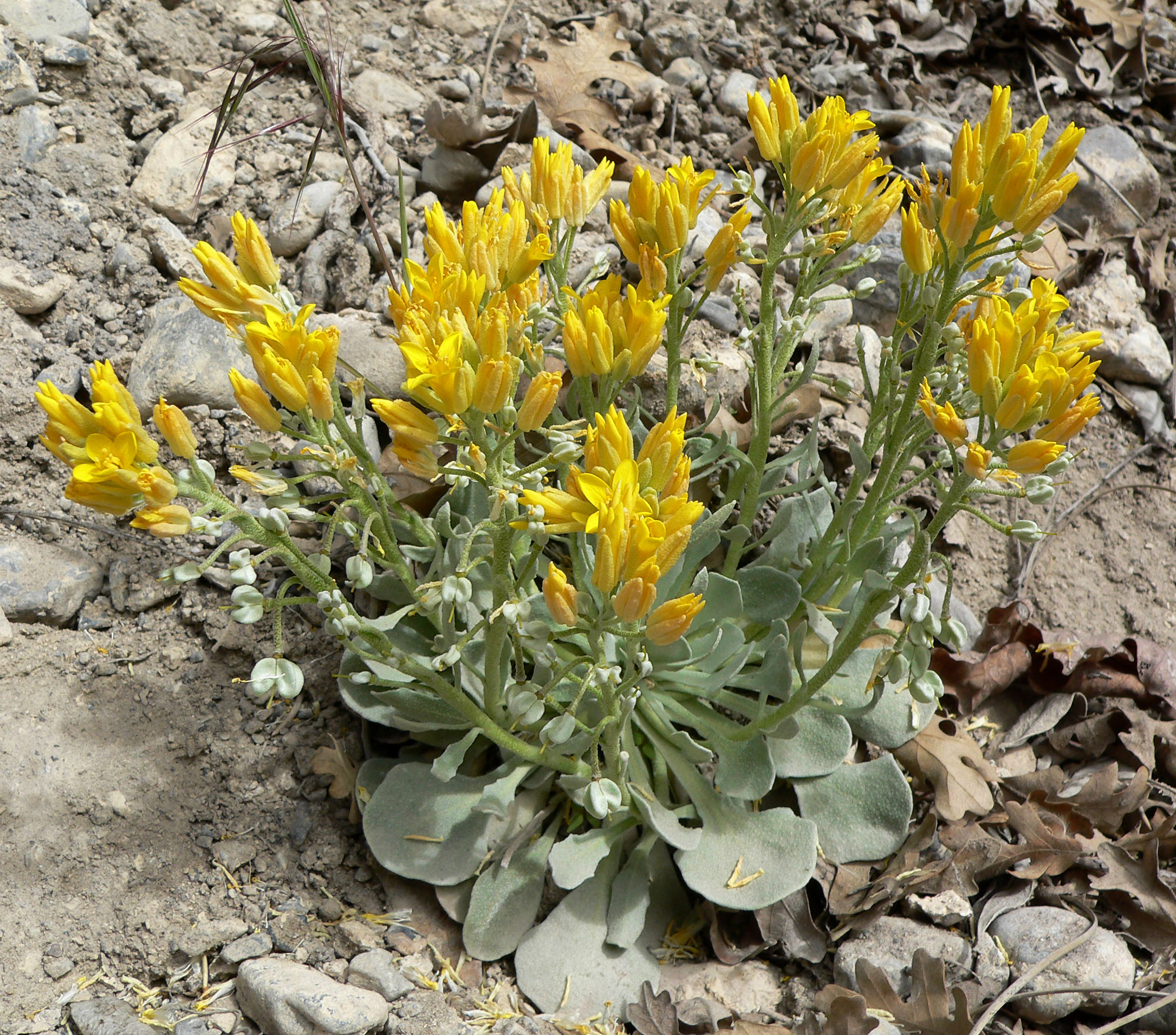
- Physaria chambersii

Scientific classification
- Kingdom: Plantae
- Clade: Tracheophytes
- Clade: Angiosperms
- Clade: Eudicots
- Clade: Rosids
- Order: Brassicales
- Family: Brassicaceae
- Genus: Physaria (Nutt. ex Torr. & A.Gray) A.Gray

Species
- See text

= Physaria =

Genus of flowering plants

Physaria is a genus of flowering plants in the family Brassicaceae. Many species are known generally as twinpods, bladderpods, or lesquerella. They are native to the Americas, with many species endemic to western North America. They are densely hairy annual and perennial herbs often growing prostrate or decumbent, along the ground in patches or clumps. They bear inflorescences of bright yellow flowers. The fruit is often notched deeply, dividing into twin sections, giving the genus its common name.

Bladderpod oil is extracted from the seeds of Physaria fendleri and certain other species in the genus.

Due to the presence of both annual and perennial herbaceous members, this genus has been used as a model for allocation pattern comparisons between the annual and perennial life cycle.

Many of species of Physaria were formerly included in the now-defunct genus Lesquerella.

According to Plants of the World Online Species include:

- Physaria acutifolia Rydb.
- Physaria alpestris Suksd.
- Physaria alpina Rollins
- Physaria angustifolia (Nutt.) O'Kane & Al-Shehbaz
- Physaria arctica (Wormsk. ex Hornem.) O'Kane & Al-Shehbaz
- Physaria arenosa (Richardson) O'Kane & Al-Shehbaz
- Physaria argentea (S.Schauer) O'Kane & Al-Shehbaz
- Physaria argyraea (A.Gray) O'Kane & Al-Shehbaz
- Physaria arizonica (S.Watson) O'Kane & Al-Shehbaz
- Physaria aurea (Wooton) O'Kane & Al-Shehbaz
- Physaria bellii G.A.Mulligan
- Physaria berlandieri (S.Watson) O'Kane & Al-Shehbaz
- Physaria brassicoides Rydb.
- Physaria calcicola (Rollins) O'Kane & Al-Shehbaz
- Physaria calderi (G.A.Mulligan & A.E.Porsild) O'Kane & Al-Shehbaz
- Physaria carinata (Rollins) O'Kane & Al-Shehbaz
- Physaria chambersii Rollins
- Physaria cinerea (S.Watson) O'Kane & Al-Shehbaz
- Physaria condensata Rollins
- Physaria congesta (Rollins) O'Kane & Al-Shehbaz
- Physaria cordiformis Rollins
- Physaria crassistigma O'Kane & Al-Shehbaz
- Physaria curvipes (A.Nelson) Grady & O'Kane
- Physaria densiflora (A.Gray) O'Kane & Al-Shehbaz
- Physaria didymocarpa (Hook.) A.Gray
- Physaria dornii Lichvar
- Physaria douglasii (S.Watson) O'Kane & Al-Shehbaz
- Physaria eburniflora Rollins
- Physaria engelmannii (A.Gray) O'Kane & Al-Shehbaz
- Physaria eriocarpa Grady & O'Kane
- Physaria fendleri (A.Gray) O'Kane & Al-Shehbaz
- Physaria filiformis (Rollins) O'Kane & Al-Shehbaz
- Physaria floribunda Rydb.
- Physaria fremontii (Rollins & E.A.Shaw) O'Kane & Al-Shehbaz
- Physaria garrettii (Payson) O'Kane & Al-Shehbaz
- Physaria geyeri (Hook.) A.Gray
- Physaria globosa (Desv.) O'Kane & Al-Shehbaz
- Physaria gooddingii (Rollins & E.A.Shaw) O'Kane & Al-Shehbaz
- Physaria gordonii (A.Gray) O'Kane & Al-Shehbaz
- Physaria gracilis (Hook.) O'Kane & Al-Shehbaz
- Physaria grahamii C.V.Morton
- Physaria hemiphysaria (Maguire) O'Kane & Al-Shehbaz
- Physaria hitchcockii (Munz) O'Kane & Al-Shehbaz
- Physaria humilis (Rollins) O'Kane & Al-Shehbaz
- Physaria inflata (Rollins & E.A.Shaw) O'Kane & Al-Shehbaz
- Physaria integrifolia (Rollins) Lichvar
- Physaria intermedia (S.Watson) O'Kane & Al-Shehbaz
- Physaria johnstonii (Rollins) O'Kane & Al-Shehbaz
- Physaria kingii (S.Watson) O'Kane & Al-Shehbaz
- Physaria klausii (Rollins) O'Kane & Al-Shehbaz
- Physaria lata (Wooton & Standl.) O'Kane & Al-Shehbaz
- Physaria lateralis O'Kane & Al-Shehbaz
- Physaria lepidota Rollins
- Physaria lesicae (Rollins) O'Kane & Al-Shehbaz
- Physaria lindheimeri (A.Gray) O'Kane & Al-Shehbaz
- Physaria ludoviciana (Nutt.) O'Kane & Al-Shehbaz
- Physaria macrocarpa (A.Nelson) O'Kane & Al-Shehbaz
- Physaria mcvaughiana (Rollins) O'Kane & Al-Shehbaz
- Physaria mendocina (Phil.) O'Kane & Al-Shehbaz
- Physaria mexicana (Rollins) O'Kane & Al-Shehbaz
- Physaria mirandiana (Rollins) O'Kane & Al-Shehbaz
- Physaria montana (A.Gray) Greene
- Physaria multiceps (Maguire) O'Kane & Al-Shehbaz
- Physaria navajoensis (O'Kane) O'Kane & Al-Shehbaz
- Physaria neeseae S.L.Welsh & N.D.Atwood
- Physaria nelsonii O'Kane & Al-Shehbaz
- Physaria newberryi A.Gray
- Physaria obcordata Rollins
- Physaria obdeltata (Rollins) O'Kane & Al-Shehbaz
- Physaria occidentalis (S.Watson) O'Kane & Al-Shehbaz
- Physaria okanensis Al-Shehbaz & Prina
- Physaria oregona S.Watson
- Physaria ovalifolia (Rydb. ex Britton) O'Kane & Al-Shehbaz
- Physaria pachyphylla O'Kane & Grady
- Physaria pallida (Torr. & A.Gray) O'Kane & Al-Shehbaz
- Physaria palmeri (S.Watson) O'Kane & Al-Shehbaz
- Physaria parviflora (Rollins) O'Kane & Al-Shehbaz
- Physaria parvula (Greene) O'Kane & Al-Shehbaz
- Physaria pendula (Rollins) O'Kane & Al-Shehbaz
- Physaria peninsularis (Wiggins) O'Kane & Al-Shehbaz
- Physaria pinetorum (Wooton & Standl.) O'Kane & Al-Shehbaz
- Physaria prostrata (A.Nelson) O'Kane & Al-Shehbaz
- Physaria pruinosa (Greene) O'Kane & Al-Shehbaz
- Physaria pueblensis (Payson) O'Kane & Al-Shehbaz
- Physaria pulvinata O'Kane & Reveal
- Physaria purpurea (A.Gray) O'Kane & Al-Shehbaz
- Physaria pycnantha Grady & O'Kane
- Physaria pygmaea O'Kane & Al-Shehbaz
- Physaria rectipes (Wooton & Standl.) O'Kane & Al-Shehbaz
- Physaria recurvata (Engelm. ex A.Gray) O'Kane & Al-Shehbaz
- Physaria reediana O'Kane & Al-Shehbaz
- Physaria rollinsii G.A.Mulligan
- Physaria rosei (Rollins) O'Kane & Al-Shehbaz
- Physaria saximontana Rollins
- Physaria schaffneri (S.Watson) O'Kane & Al-Shehbaz
- Physaria scrotiformis O'Kane
- Physaria sessilis (S.Watson) O'Kane & Al-Shehbaz
- Physaria sinuosa (Rollins) O'Kane & Al-Shehbaz
- Physaria spatulata (Rydb.) Grady & O'Kane
- Physaria subumbellata (Rollins) O'Kane & Al-Shehbaz
- Physaria tenella (A.Nelson) O'Kane & Al-Shehbaz
- Physaria thamnophila (Rollins & E.A.Shaw) O'Kane & Al-Shehbaz
- Physaria tumulosa (Barneby) O'Kane & Al-Shehbaz
- Physaria urbaniana (Muschl.) O'Kane & Al-Shehbaz
- Physaria valida (Greene) O'Kane & Al-Shehbaz
- Physaria vicina (J.L.Anderson, Reveal & Rollins) O'Kane & Al-Shehbaz
- Physaria vigana B.L.Turner
- Physaria vitulifera Rydb.
- Physaria wyndii (Rollins & E.A.Shaw) O'Kane & Al-Shehbaz
