= Lesquerolic acid =

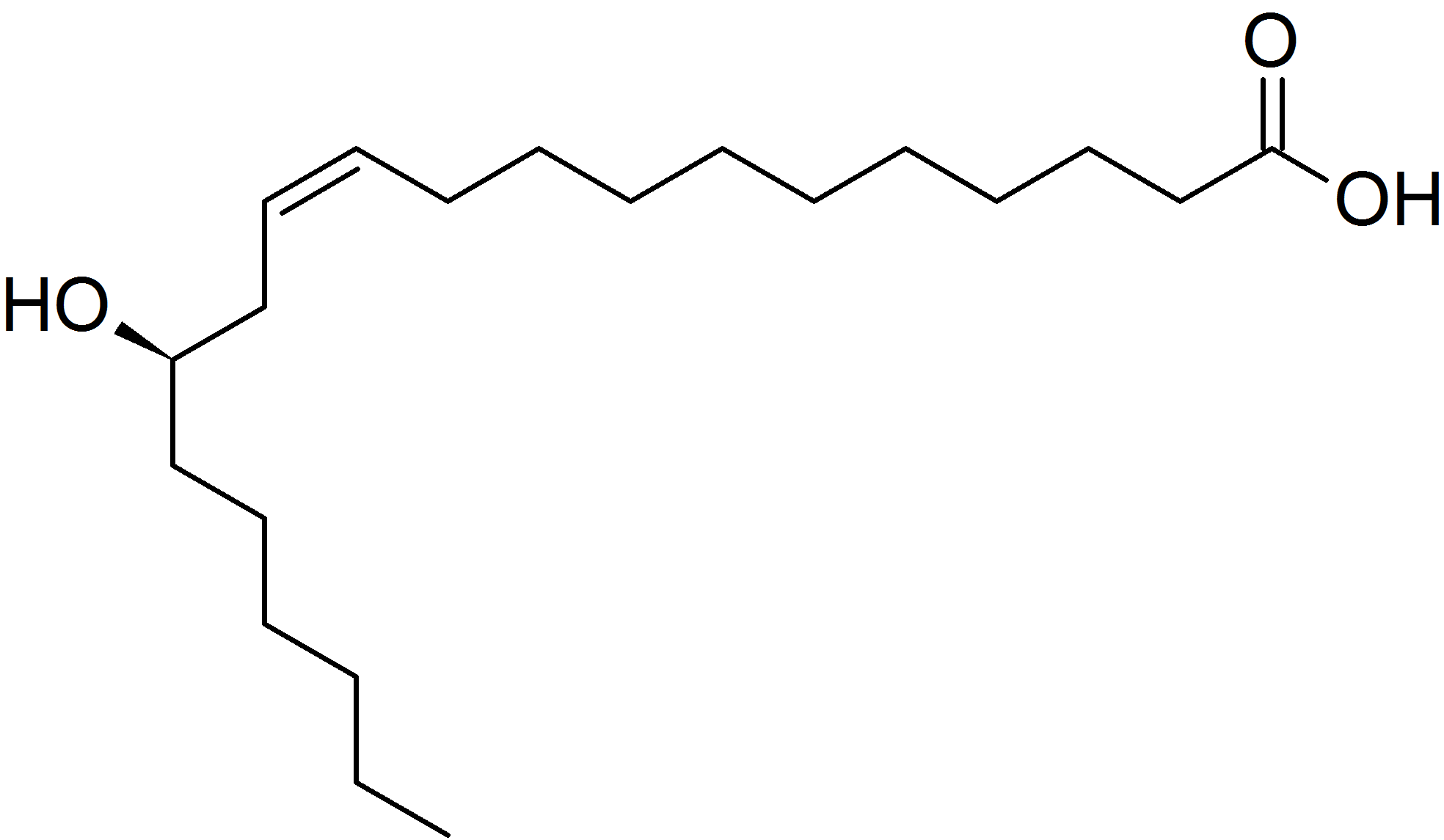
- Stereo, skeletal formula of lesquerolic acid (Z,R)

Names
- Preferred IUPAC name (11Z,14R)-14-Hydroxyicos-11-enoic acid

Identifiers
CAS Number	4103-20-2
3D model (JSmol)	Interactive image
ChEBI	CHEBI:165421
ChemSpider	4472235
MeSH	lesquerolic+acid
PubChem CID	5312810
UNII	87K5QW62TR
CompTox Dashboard (EPA)	DTXSID101029878
- InChI: InChI=1S/C20H38O3/c1-2-3-4-13-16-19(21)17-14-11-9-7-5-6-8-10-12-15-18-20(22)23/h11,14,19,21H,2-10,12-13,15-18H2,1H3,(H,22,23)/b14-11-/t19-/m1/s1 Key: OONXYOAWMIVMCI-KWRJMZDGSA-N
- SMILES: O=C(O)CCCCCCCCC\C=C/C[C@H](O)CCCCCC

Properties
Chemical formula	C_{20}H_{38}O_{3}
Molar mass	326.521 g·mol^{−1}
- Except where otherwise noted, data are given for materials in their standard state (at 25 °C [77 °F], 100 kPa). Infobox references

Lesquerolic acid is a hydroxycarboxylic acid that occurs naturally in Paysonia lasiocarpa and other Paysonia and Physaria species. The acid is typically found together with other hydroxylated fatty acids, such as densipolic, auricolic, ricinoleic, etc.

This compound has the R configuration at the alcohol-bearing stereocenter, and it is of the Z configuration at the olefin. Lesquerolic acid is chemically similar to ricinoleic acid, but with two additional carbons at the carboxyl end of the carbon chain.

== Uses ==
Lesquerolic acid, with other hydroxy fatty acids, has important industrial uses, including making resins, waxes, nylons and plastics.
