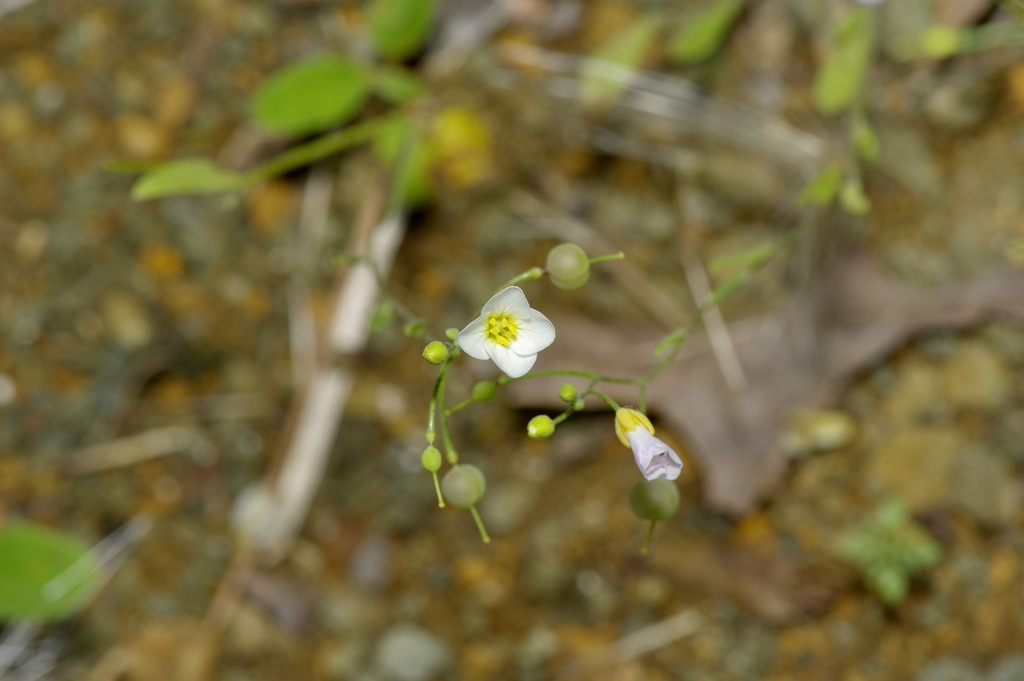
- Physaria pallida in bloom with developing seeds

Conservation status
- Critically Imperiled (NatureServe)

Scientific classification
- Kingdom: Plantae
- Clade: Tracheophytes
- Clade: Angiosperms
- Clade: Eudicots
- Clade: Rosids
- Order: Brassicales
- Family: Brassicaceae
- Genus: Physaria
- Species: P. pallida

Binomial name
- Physaria pallida (Torr. & A.Gray) O’Kane & Al-Shehbaz
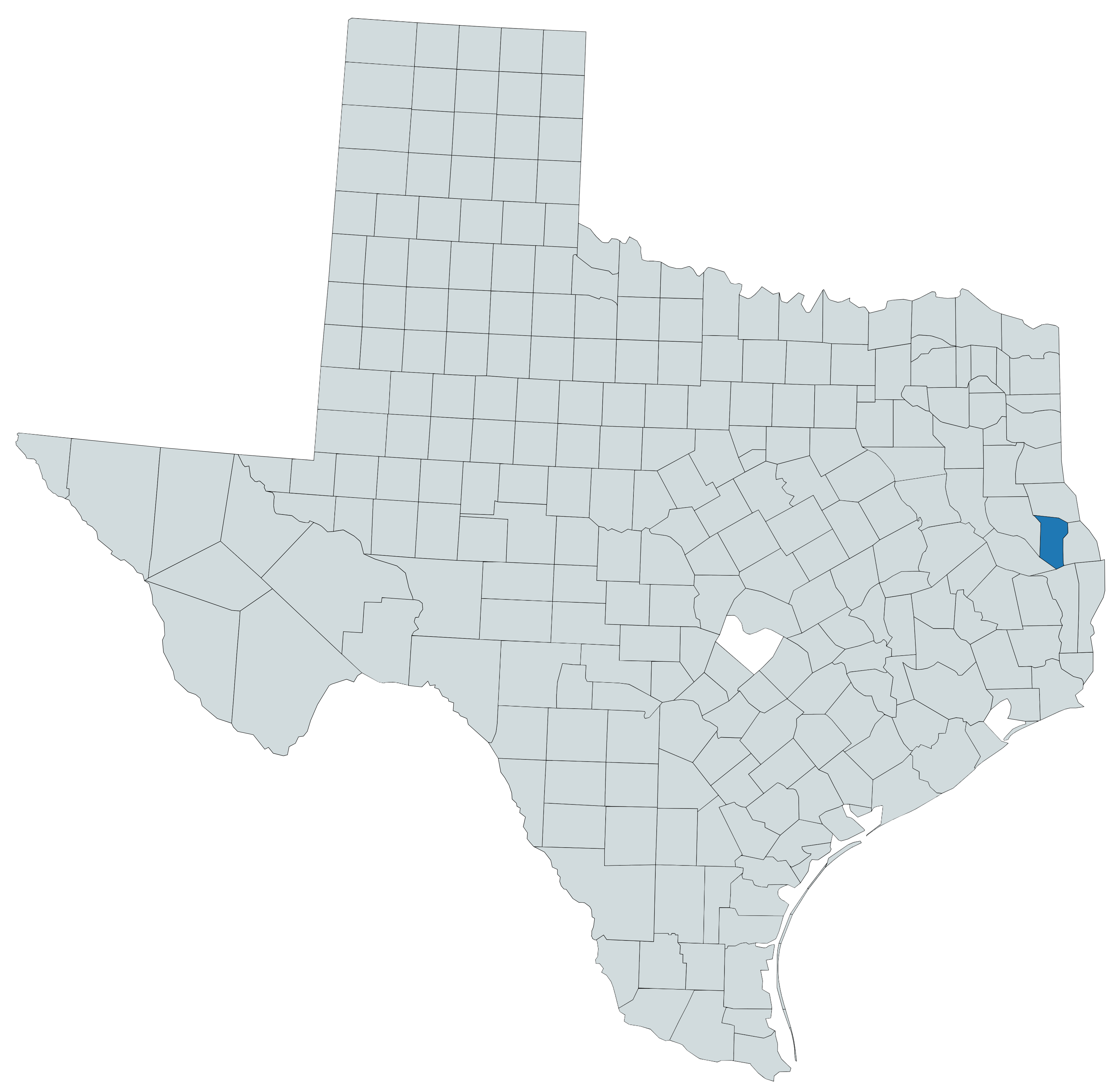
- Range of Physaria pallida

Synonyms
- Lesquerella pallida

= Physaria pallida =

Species of flowering plant

Physaria pallida (syn. Lesquerella pallida) is a rare species of flowering plant in the mustard family known by the common name white bladderpod. It is endemic to Texas in the United States, where it is known only from San Augustine County. It is federally listed as an endangered species.

== Description ==
This is an annual herb growing mostly erect to a height of 30 to 60 centimeters. The leaves may be any of a variety of shapes and have smooth, toothed, or lobed edges. The longest near the base of the plant can reach 10 centimeters in length. The inflorescence is a raceme of flowers with oval white petals that narrow near the yellowish bases and measure just over a centimeter long. The fruit is a spherical silique which is variable in size.

== Habitat ==
This plant was discovered in the 1830s but not seen again until its rediscovery in 1981. It has never been found outside of San Augustine County, Texas. There are six populations. The plant grows on openings in oak, hickory, and pine woods. It is limited to a part of the Piney Woods region on the Gulf Coastal Plain where there is alkaline soil derived from the Weches Formation. This geologic formation contains carbonates above a layer of water-impermeable glauconite, which keeps the soil above from draining, leaving the area quite moist. Most of the soils in eastern Texas are acidic, but the calcium and magnesium minerals in this formation make it alkaline. Other rare plants that occur on the Weches Formation include Sedum pulchellum, Calylophus drummondianus, Liatris mucronata, Paronychia virginica, Petalostemum pulcherrimum, Heliotropium tenellum, Eleocharis compressa, and Cuphea viscosissima.

== Conservation ==
This plant is threatened by the loss and degradation of its habitat, which has largely been converted to agricultural and pasture use, or degraded during glauconite gravel mining operations, the product of which is used for road surfacing. The ecological succession of brush and woody vegetation into the clearings on which it depends also threatens the plant. It does not tolerate competition with other plants. Habitat conservation activities include the removal of brush and vegetation buildup by mechanical means or with herbicides or fire. Most of the populations occur on private property, so conservation will depend on the cooperation of landowners.
