= Reed C. Rollins =

American botanist (1911-1998)

Reed Clark Rollins
- Born: December 7, 1911
- Died: April 28, 1998 (aged 86)
- Education: University of Wyoming; Harvard University
- Occupations: Botanist, Professor

Reed Clark Rollins (7 December 1911 – 28 April 1998) was an American botanist, professor at Harvard University and one of the founders of both the International Association for Plant Taxonomy and the Organization for Tropical Studies. He was also the second president of each of them.

== Bibliography ==
- Al-Shehbaz, Ihsan A. (1999). "Reed Clark Rollins (7 December 1911 – 28 April 1998)". Taxon. 48 (2): 225–256. Bibcode:1999Taxon..48..225A. doi:10.1002/j.1996-8175.1999.tb05426.x. JSTOR 1224430.
- Al-Shehbaz, Ihsan A. (2000). "Chapter 13: Reed Clark Rollins". In National Academy of Sciences (ed.). Biographic Memoirs. Vol. 78. Washington, DC: The National Academies Press. doi:10.17226/9977. ISBN 978-0-309-07035-5.
- Campbell, Christopher S.; Greene, Craig W. (1988). "A Tribute to Reed Clark Rollins, Recipient of the 1987 Asa Gray Award". Systematic Botany. 13 (1): 170–171.
