= Broomweed =

Broomweed is a common name for several species of plants, including:

- Amphiachyris amoena, also known as Texas broomweed
- Amphiachyris dracunculoides, also known as annual broomweed, prairie broomweed, or common broomweed
- Corchorus siliquosus, a tropical plant used to make brooms
- Gutierrezia sarothrae, also known as perennial broomweed or broom snakeweed
- Gutierrezia texana, also known as Texas snakeweed or matchweed
- Malvastrum coromandelianum
- Scoparia dulcis, also known as sweet broomweed
- Sida species, tropical plants used to make brooms
- Triumfetta species, tropical plants used to make brooms
