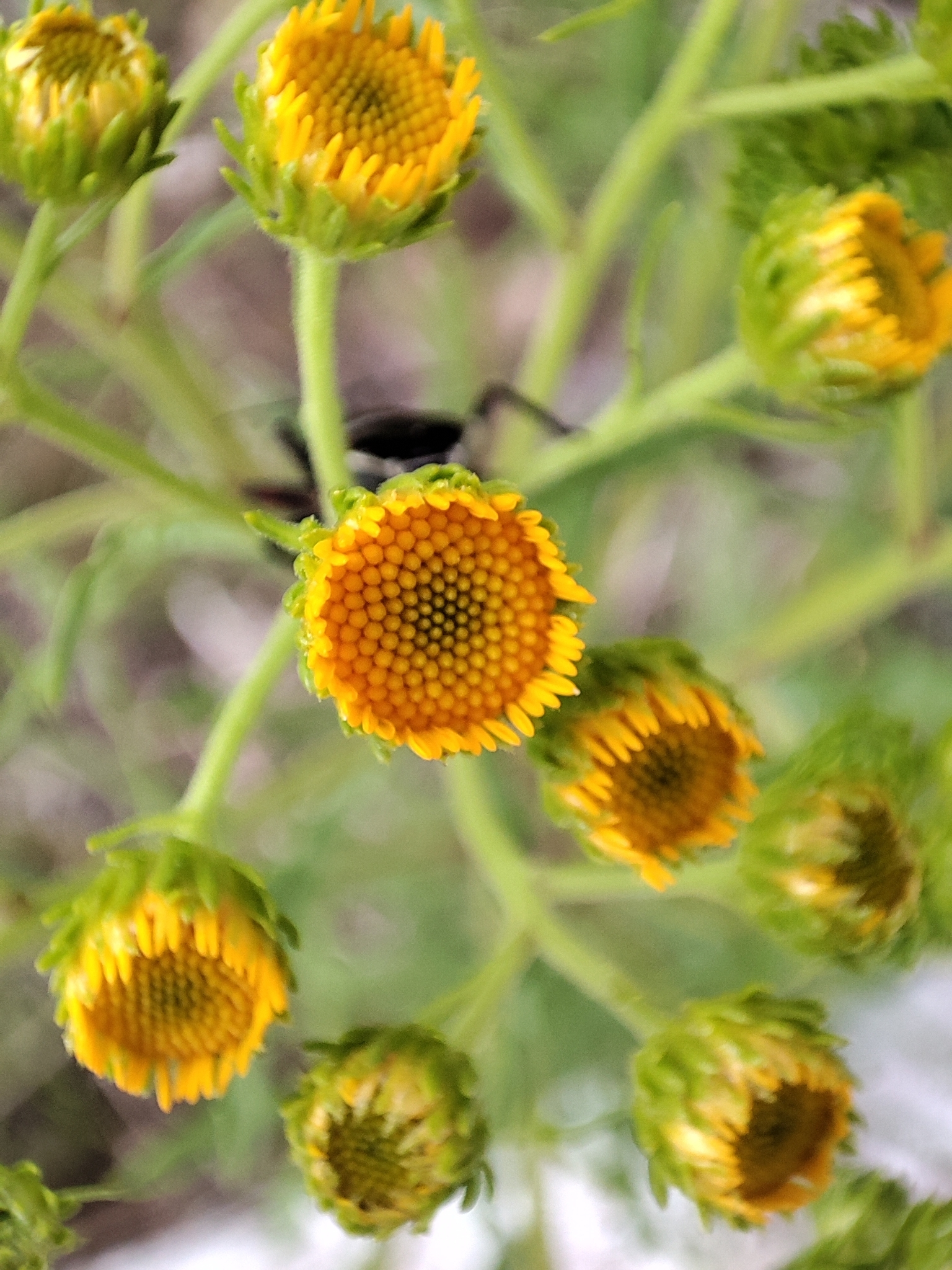
- Xanthocephalum gymnospermoides

Scientific classification
- Kingdom: Plantae
- Clade: Embryophytes
- Clade: Tracheophytes
- Clade: Angiosperms
- Clade: Eudicots
- Clade: Asterids
- Order: Asterales
- Family: Asteraceae
- Subfamily: Asteroideae
- Tribe: Astereae
- Subtribe: Machaerantherinae
- Genus: Xanthocephalum; Willd.

Synonyms
- Grindeliopsis Sch.Bip.; Guenthera Regel

= Xanthocephalum =

Genus of flowering plants

Xanthocephalum is a genus of North American plants in the tribe Astereae within the family Asteraceae.

The name "Xanthocephalum" means "yellow head," from the Greek "xanthos," yellow and "kephale," head. The genus was once much larger than it is today, with many of its former members transferred to Gutierrezia in the 1980s.

Species

- Xanthocephalum amoenum Shinners - Texas
- Xanthocephalum benthamianum Hemsl. - Aguascalientes, San Luis Potosí, Chihuahua, Durango, Michoacán, Jalisco
- Xanthocephalum centauroides Willd. - Michoacán, Durango, D.F., Guanajuato, México State
- Xanthocephalum durangense M.A.Lane - Durango
- Xanthocephalum eradiatum (M.A.Lane) G.L.Nesom - Chihuahua
- Xanthocephalum gymnospermoides (A.Gray) Benth. & Hook.f. - United States (Arizona, Texas), Chihuahua, Sonora
- Xanthocephalum humile (Kunth) Benth. & Hook.f. - Hidalgo, D.F., Puebla, Tlaxcala, México State, San Luis Potosí
- Xanthocephalum megalocephalum Fernald - Chihuahua

formerly included

see Amphiachyris Gutierrezia Gymnosperma Pilosella Stephanodoria
