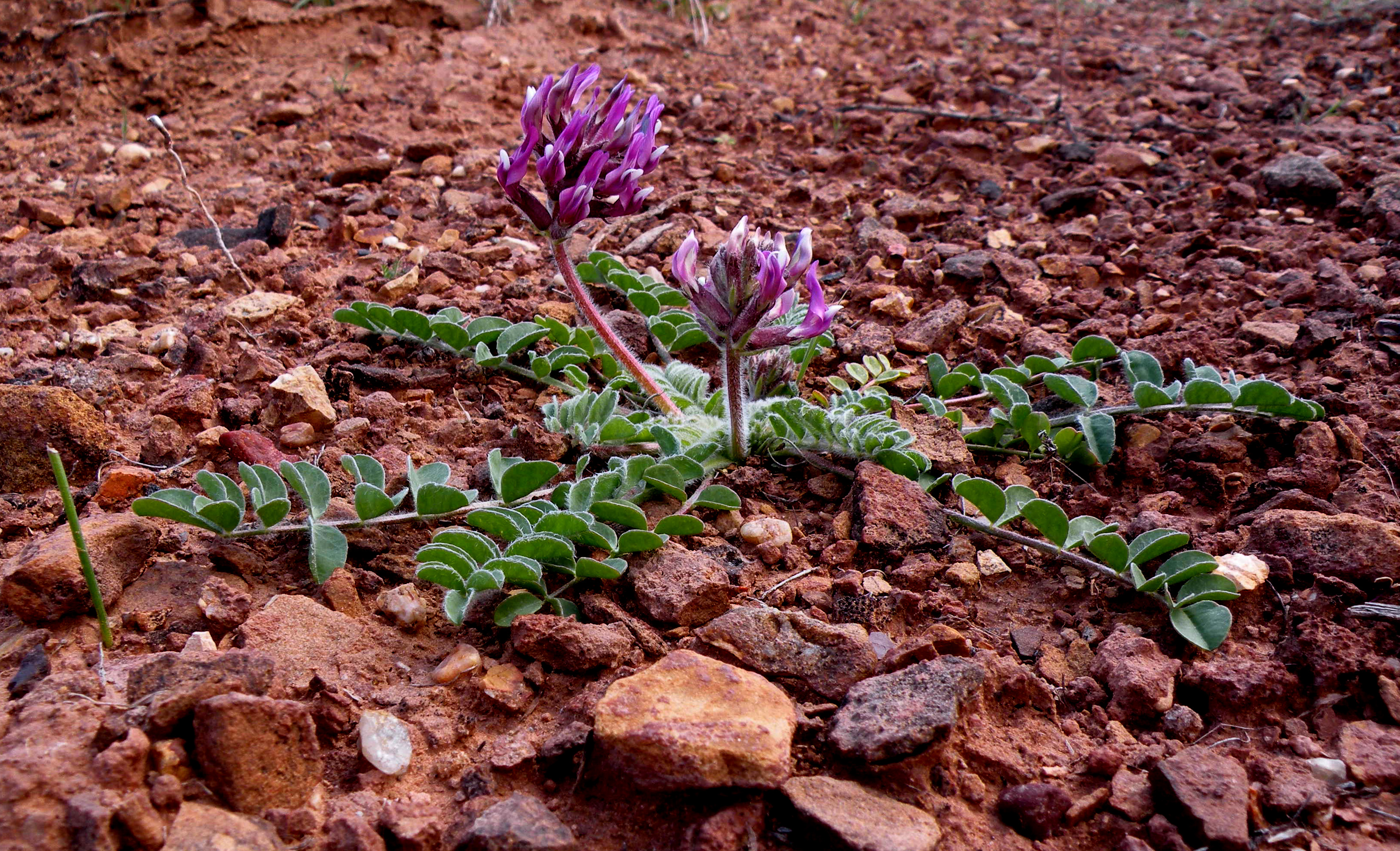

Conservation status
- Critically Imperiled (NatureServe)

Scientific classification
- Kingdom: Plantae
- Clade: Tracheophytes
- Clade: Angiosperms
- Clade: Eudicots
- Clade: Rosids
- Order: Fabales
- Family: Fabaceae
- Subfamily: Faboideae
- Genus: Astragalus
- Species: A. holmgreniorum

Binomial name
- Astragalus holmgreniorum Barneby
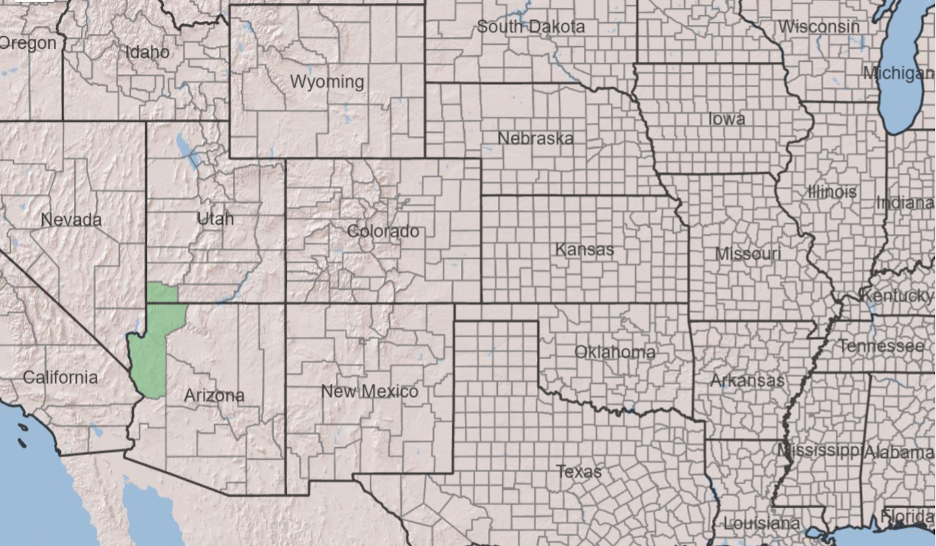
- Geographical Distribution of A. holmgrenorium

= Astragalus holmgreniorum =

Species of endangered plant

Astragalus holmgreniorum is a rare species of milkvetch known by the common names Holmgren milk-vetch and paradox milk-vetch. It is native to a tiny section of desert shrub woodland on the border between Utah and Arizona, in the far northern Mojave Desert. There are six populations remaining. It is a federally listed endangered species.

This is a perennial herb with no stem, just leaves emerging directly from the root crown. The leaves are up to 13 centimeters long and are made up of several leaflets each measuring up to 1.6 centimeters in length. The inflorescence is a raceme of 6 to 16 flowers. Each pea-like flower has a purple corolla about 2 centimeters long. The peduncle bends down and lies on the ground as the fruits develop. Each fruit is a legume pod up to 5 centimeters long.

Threats to the existence of this species include damage to the habitat from off-road vehicles, highway maintenance, power line installation, and grazing, and invasion by introduced species.

== Description ==
The Astragalus holmgreniorum is a herbaceous non-woody perennial that produces small purple flowers during the spring. This stem-less perennial grows close to the ground and after flowering, it dies back to the root crown. Astragalus holmgreniorum grows close to the ground with its leaves pinnately compound, on opposite sides of the stem in a row. The leaves are 4 to 13 cm long and have 9 to 15 leaflets that are 0.6 to 1.6 cm long and are obovately shaped.

The purple flowers are pedicels that consist of short floral stalks that grow on a branched supporting stalk. They have a distinct pea-like shape with 5 petals ranging from 1.8 to 2.4 cm in length and 0.6 to 0.9 cm in width. The flowers grow in groups of 6 to 16. Astragalus holmgreniorum produces fruits that are two-chambered legume pods that keep up to 38 seeds. The pods are 3 to 5 cm long and 0.6 to 0.9 cm wide.

== Life cycle ==
Astragalus holmgreniorum is a short-lived plant. They experience low survivorship from germination to one-year-old juvenile or reproductive adult. It is rare for these plants to live past their third growing season Fewer than 2 percent of seedlings live into their fourth growing season. Many studies have shown that seed production and seed bank persistence are two key life-history transitions that are affecting population survival.

As for the life cycle, seedlings usually emerge in late winter, but for plants entering their second year of growth or older, they appear several weeks before the new seedlings. This occurs in late February or early March. Astragalus holmgreniorum flowers between March and April. They set fruit by the end of April and their seed pods remain until the end of May. The plants then die back to their roots between late May and mid-June Not all plants produce flowers. Usually, plants that have survived at least one dormant season produce them. The seeds are dormant at maturity and they lose their hard seededness over a period of 10 or more years in the soil.

== Population size ==
In 1993, three populations of A. holmgreniorum were discovered and listed. Land managers and botanists have since divided these three populations of A. holmgreniorum into six smaller populations because of the distance between each population. In 2001, when the plant was listed as endangered, the United States Fish and Wildlife Service (FWS) estimated a population size between 10,030 and 11,030 adult plants. The most recent report on A. holmgreniorum, in 2021, estimated a total adult population of 7,100 range-wide.

== Geographic distribution and range ==
The six populations of A. holmgreniorum are found in Washington County, Utah and Mohave County, Arizona in an area just under 25 km^{2} (10 sq. mi). Three major concentrations of the plant are broken into six populations. The largest concentration is along the Utah-Arizona state border. There are three populations within this grouping: State Line, Gardner Wall, and Central Valley.There are two populations in the city of Santa Clara, UT: South Hills and Stucki Spring. The last population is isolated east of St. George, UT called Purgatory Flat. There is no known data for the historic distribution of A. holmgreniorum. However, there is a past loss of habitats with similar conditions to the suitable habitat of A. holmgreniorum, indicating it may have had a larger range.

== Ecology ==
=== Diet ===
Astragalus holmgrenorium is a photoautotrophic plant. This means that it relies on photosynthesis to produce its energy from sunlight.

=== Pollinators ===
Astragalus holmgrenorium relies on the production of seeds for reproduction. Seeds are dispersed by insect visitation, pollination, water, and smaller ground-dwelling birds. Native bees such as Anthophora coptognatha, Anthopora dammersi, Anthopora porterae, Eucera quadricincta, Osmia titusi, two types of Dialictus species, and the introduced honeybee, Apis mellifera, are the primary visitors and pollinators of A. holmgreniorum.

=== Habitat ===
Astragalus holmgrenorium requires appropriate soils, geological layers, slope, drainage and plant community within the landscape to provide space for individual and population growth. A. holmgrenorium occurs in the Mojave Desert ecoregion: the Sonora-Mojave-Creosotebush-White Bursage Desert Scrub. Its native habitat is sparsely vegetated, warm, and desert. The desert scrub has a sparse to a moderately dense layer of shrubs (2-50% coverage). The landscape has small and large hills, along with plateau formations that are broken up by water erosion. Specifically, A. homgrenorium plants are found on the Virgin Limestone member, middle red member, and upper red member of the Moenkopi Formation and the Petrified Forest member of the Chinle Formation.

Astragalus holmgreniorum occurs at elevations from 2480 to 3000 ft, and is found slightly above or on the edge of drainage areas. Populations receive run-on water from nearby sloping areas. Astragalus holmgrenorium is associated with the following soils that are defined by the USDA:

- Badlands – very steep
- Eroded land-Shalet complex – warm
- Hobog-rock land association
- Isom cobbly sandy loam
- Gypill Hobog complex – 6-35% slopes
- Gypill very cobbly sandy loam – 15-40% slopes
- Hobog-Grapevine complex – 2-35% slopes

Other native plants in association with A. holmgrenorium include:

- Desert goldenhead (Acamptopappus sphaerocephalus)
- White burrobush (Ambrosia dumosa)
- Nevada jointfir (Ephedra nevadensis)
- Torrey's jointfir (Ephedra torreyana)
- White ratany (Krameria grayi)
- Range ratany (Krameria parvifolia)
- Anderson wolfberry (Lycium andersonii)
- Threadleaf snakeweed (Gutierrezia microcephala)
- Broom snakeweed (Gutierrezia sarothrae)

=== Range ===
Astragalus holmgrenorium has a relatively small geographic distribution. All six known populations of A. holmgrenorium occur within approximately 10 miles of St. George, Utah. These populations are distributed throughout Washington County, Utah and Mojave County, Arizona.

== Major threats ==
The small population sizes and range of A. holmgreniorum make the species highly vulnerable to both natural disruptions and human activity. The most serious threats to the species are identified as habitat loss and fragmentation; habitat degradation; competition and displacement caused by invasive species; and loss of pollinators.

=== Habitat loss and fragmentation ===
The main source of habitat loss and fragmentation within the known populations is the urban development and expansion of St. George, Utah. As the city grows, plans for development are spreading into habitat for A. holmgreniorum. Proposed plans include multi-use developments of high-density residential areas with commercial and industrial sites. Proposed additions to Interstate-15 run through known habitats of A. holmgreniorum. Developments near small populations of species break populations and can lead to severe effects. Separating populations of the plant makes it hard for pollination to happen.

=== Habitat degradation ===
The most serious threat of habitat degradation comes from the use of off-road vehicles (ORV). Between 1998 and 2006, ORV use in Washington County, Utah went up 438%. Use of ORV off designated paths and dirt roads damages hills and plateaus where A. holmgreniorum are most often found. The tires break the soil and change the water cycle and flow of the habitat. This creates open environments for invasive grass species. The FWS has called this a serious and ongoing threat. Habitat degradation due to cattle is also a major concern for the populations of State Line and Gardner Wall where cattle ranchers live. A. holmgreniorum, however, is less susceptible to herbivores than other milk-vetch species.

=== Competition and displacement from invasive species ===
The increased density and range of invasive species such as cheatgrass (Bromus tectorum) and red brome (Bromus madritensis) has led to the potential of local extinctions of populations of A. holmgreniorum. Cheatgrass (Bromus tectorum) and red brome (Bromus madritensis), living in broken soils across the Mojave Desert, grow in abundance and dry quickly, leading to fires over large areas. The Arizona-Utah state border is not fire-adapted and has an historic occurrence of fire every 250 years. The invasive species are fire-adapted and take over more area after a fire. Invasive species also emerge before the milk-vetches and out-compete the seedlings for sunlight and water.

=== Loss of pollinators ===
A. holmgreniorum is capable of self-pollination, but the presence of pollinators makes it easier for the plants to create seeds and spread. The main threat to pollinators is habitat fragmentation that pushes populations of A. holmgreniorum outside of the pollinators’ range. Habitat fragmentation caused by road production also leads to more pollinators dying by car collisions.

== Listing under the ESA ==
A. holmgreniorum was federally listed as endangered in October 2001 after a final rule making publication in September 2001. This decision was based on declining populations and the severity of the threats listed above. The FWS ranked the recovery priority 5C, which means a high number and severity of threats and a low potential for full recovery.

== Five-year review ==
A 5-year review was done in 2007 with no changes to the status made because the species was recently listed. Another 5-year review was asked for in 2016. The 5-year review came out in 2021. The status of endangered and the priority ranking of 5C did not change. The threats laid out in the recovery plan and 5-year review of 2007 are still severe. The 2021 5-year review also showed a decline in population size in every population. The three smallest populations—South Hills, Stucki Spring, and Purgatory Flat—show few to no plants in recent years. The distribution between populations is now 56% in the State Line Population, 42% in the Central Valley population, and two percent in the remaining populations. The 5-year review shows unsuccessful conservation efforts.

== Recovery plan ==
A recovery plan for A. holmgreniorum was written in September 2006. The recovery goal for A. holmgreniorum is to have a large enough population that the plant can survive without conservation efforts from the ESA. The recovery plan includes dozens of criteria that are both population-based and threat based. Once these criteria are reached, a petition will be submitted to delist the species from endangered to threatened. There are five main objectives that the criteria for delisting fall under and are necessary for the criteria to be met:

- maintain the distribution of A. holmgreniorum to the extent practicable throughout its current range;
- effectively manage the species habitat, considering environmental changes and new insights;
- effectively monitor population trends, emerging threats, and the performance of protection strategies;
- ensure that offsite measures are in place to minimize extinction risks from catastrophic events, and;
- engage partners in a long-term commitment to the recovery and post-delisting conservation of A. holmgreniorum.

Because of the small geographic range and population size of A. holmgreniorum, the top priority is to keep the current population size and range of A. holmgreniorum. The second priority is to conserve the habitat for A. holmgreniorum and its pollinators. The FWS has approved 6289 acres of land for critical habitat along the Arizona-Utah State border. The FWS also wants to increase the range and size of A. holmgreniorum by planting A. holmgreniorum in new locations that are suitable for the species. One criterion for delisting a species from the ESA is new populations created. The current recovery status of the species is poor—the threats continue to outrank the conservation efforts made. Population decline since the listing has kept the status of endangered and highest priority the same. Three of the populations are now facing local extinction.
