= G. californica =

G. californica may refer to:

- Gutierrezia californica, the San Joaquin snakeweed and California matchweed, a flowering plant species native to California and Baja California

== Synonyms ==
- Gale californica, a synonym for Myrica californica, the California bayberry, California wax myrtle or Pacific wax myrtle, an evergreen shrub or small tree species native to the Pacific Ocean coast of North America from Vancouver Island south to California
- Gastropacha californica, a synonym for Phyllodesma americana, the American lappet moth, a moth species found from Nova Scotia to Georgia, west through Texas to California, north to British Columbia and Yukon

== See also ==
- List of Latin and Greek words commonly used in systematic names § C
