= Guenthera =

Guenthera may refer to the following plants:

- Guenthera, a genus in the family Brassicaceae
- Guenthera, a synonym of Xanthocephalum, a genus in the family Asteraceae

== See also ==
- Guentheria (disambiguation), several genera
