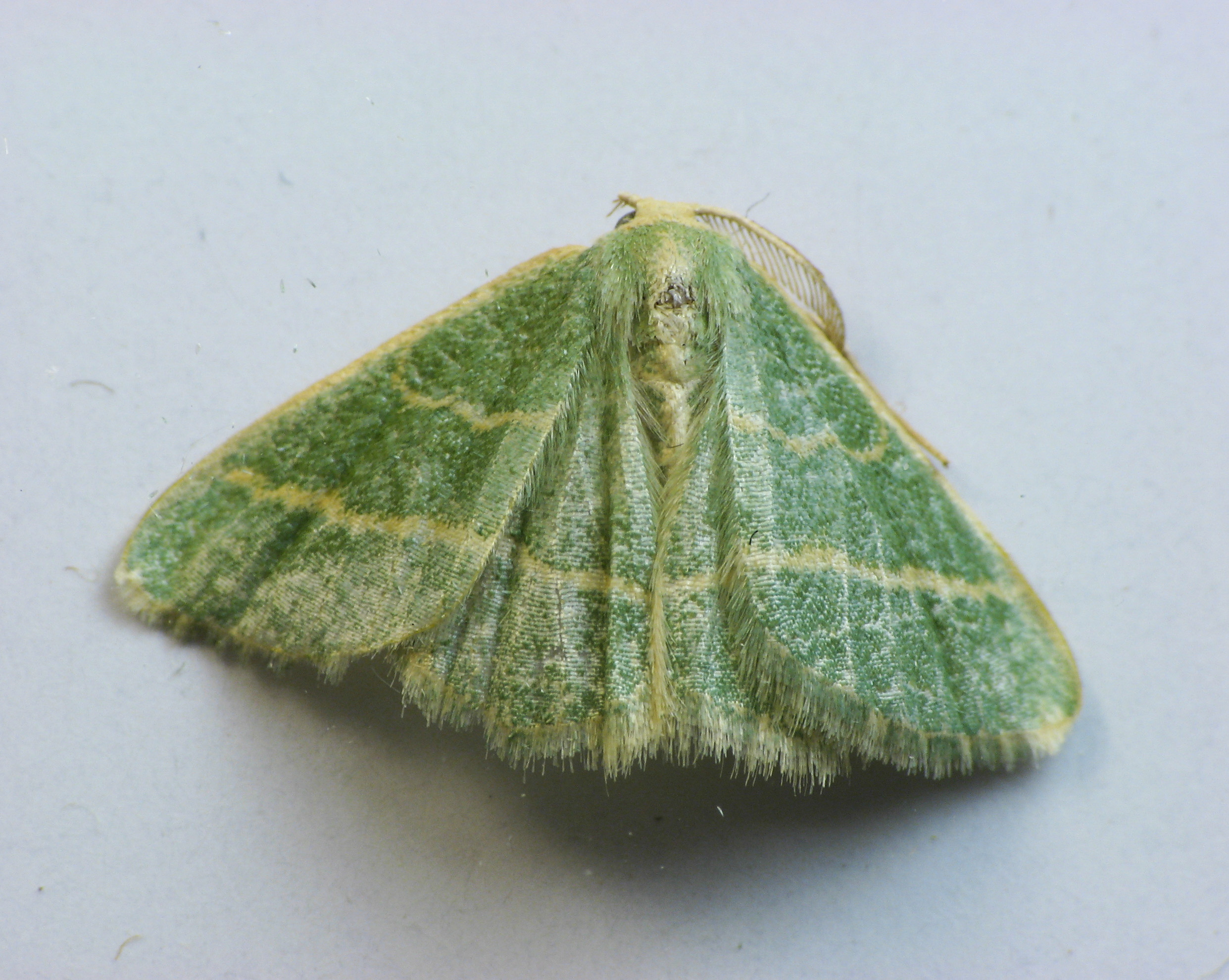

Scientific classification
- Kingdom: Animalia
- Phylum: Arthropoda
- Clade: Pancrustacea
- Class: Insecta
- Order: Lepidoptera
- Family: Geometridae
- Genus: Chlorochlamys
- Species: C. chloroleucaria

Binomial name
- Chlorochlamys chloroleucaria (Guenée, 1858)

Synonyms
- Nemoria chloroleucaria Guenée, 1857; Nemoria indiscriminata Walker, [1863]; Nemoria densaria Walker, [1863]; Thassodes deprivata Walker, [1863]; Geometra desolataria Herrich-Schäffer, 1870; Aplodes flavilineata Riley, 1870; Eucrostis rectilinea Zeller, 1872

= Chlorochlamys chloroleucaria =

Species of moth

Chlorochlamys chloroleucaria, the blackberry looper, is a moth of the family Geometridae. It is found from Nova Scotia to Florida, west in Canada to Manitoba, west in the United States to the Rocky Mountains, and south into Mexico.

It is also listed as occurring in Great Britain. This is based on a single individual held in the BMNH and originating from the early 19th century.

The wingspan is 14–23 mm. Adults are on wing from April to November in the south and from May to September in the north. There are at least two generations per year.

The larvae feed on the fruit of blackberries and petals of various composite flowers. Recorded food plants include Achillea millefolium, Ambrosia, Aster, Chrysanthemum leucanthemum, Eupatorium perfoliatum, Gutierrezia dracunculoides, Gutierrezia texana, Helenium autumnale, Helianthus, Parthenium hysterophorus, Rudbeckia hirta, Solidago, Vernonia, Zinnia, Dianthus, Prunus pennsylvanica, Rubus, Ceanothus, Myrica asplenifolia and Apocynum androsaemifolium.
