= Lone Mesa State Park =

State park in Dolores County, Colorado

- Location within Colorado
- Location: Dolores County, Colorado, U.S.
- Nearest city: Dolores, Colorado
- Coordinates: 37°45′00″N 108°27′00″W
- Area: 11,618 acres (4,702 hectares)
- Visitors: 960 (in 2021)
- Governing body: Colorado Parks and Wildlife

Lone Mesa State Park is a closed-access state park in Colorado located 23 miles (37 kilometers) north of Dolores. It is currently undergoing development and planning. According to the park's website, the park is "restricted to hunting, volunteer and educational programs."

Several local endemic species have been located or described in the park including Physaria puvinata Gutierrezia elegens and Pakera mancosana.
