= Guentheria =

Guentheria may be:

- Guentheria Spreng., a synonym for Gaillardia, a genus of flowering plants in the family Asteraceae
- Guentheria Leman 1821 non Sprengel 1826, synonym for Corsinia, a genus of liverworts in the order Marchantiales
- Guentheria Bleeker, synonym for Halichoeres, a genus of fish

== See also ==
- Guenthera (disambiguation), several genera
