= Gutierrezia petradoria =

Scientific classification
- Kingdom: Plantae
- Clade: Tracheophytes
- Clade: Angiosperms
- Clade: Eudicots
- Clade: Asterids
- Order: Asterales
- Family: Asteraceae
- Genus: Gutierrezia
- Species: G. petradoria

Binomial name
- Gutierrezia petradoria (S.L.Welsh & Goodrich) S.L.Welsh 1983

Synonyms
- Xanthocephalum petradoria S.L.Welsh & Goodrich 1981

Species of flowering plant

Gutierrezia petradoria is a species of flowering plant in the family Asteraceae known by the common names San Pedro snakeweed and goldenrod snakeweed

== Distribution ==
The plant is endemic to western Utah, located the Southwestern United States. It is native to the Lower Sevier River watershed, within Juab County and Millard County.

== Description ==
Gutierrezia petradoria is a perennial herb to woody subshrub, growing up to 40 cm (16 in) in height.

At the end of each branch there is an inflorescence of one or a few flower heads. The heads are larger than for most of the species in the genus. The head contains 5-13 disc florets with 4-10 yellow ray florets around the edge. The ray flowers are up to 10 mm (0.39 in) long, much larger and showier than in the case of most other species in the genus.
