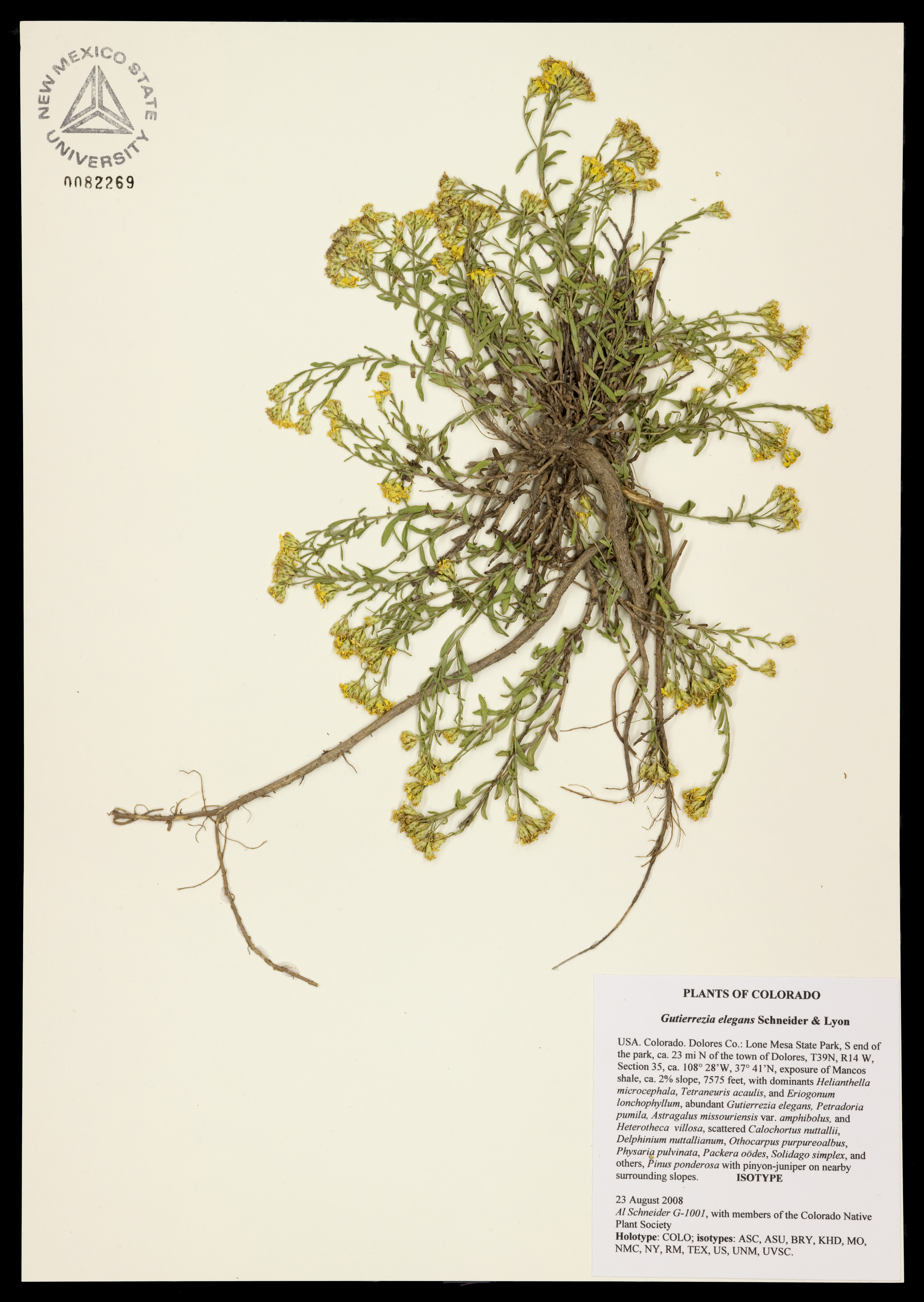

Conservation status
- Critically Imperiled (NatureServe)

Scientific classification
- Kingdom: Plantae
- Clade: Embryophytes
- Clade: Tracheophytes
- Clade: Spermatophytes
- Clade: Angiosperms
- Clade: Eudicots
- Clade: Asterids
- Order: Asterales
- Family: Asteraceae
- Genus: Gutierrezia
- Species: G. elegans

Binomial name
- Gutierrezia elegans Al Schneid. & P.Lyon

= Gutierrezia elegans =

Species of flowering plant

Gutierrezia elegans, the Lone Mesa snakeweed, is a species of Gutierrezia endemic to the United States.

== Discovery ==
Gutierrezia elegans was discovered by Peggy Lyon, a Colorado State University botanist, and Al Schneider, an amateur botanist of the Four Corners area, August 4, 2008. Lyon and Schneider found the plant while they were putting together a list of plant species in Lone Mesa State Park in Colorado. Peggy said that they would have missed noticing the plant if they were only looking for known rare plants. They sent the specimen to Guy Nesom, a plant expert. Guy and other experts examined the plant and agreed that it was a previously undiscovered species of Gutierrezia. Tim Hogan, an employee of the University of Colorado Herbarium, said that the discovery shows us how little we know about biodiversity.

The Lone Mesa snakeweed was the sixth new plant discovered in Colorado in roughly 15 years.
