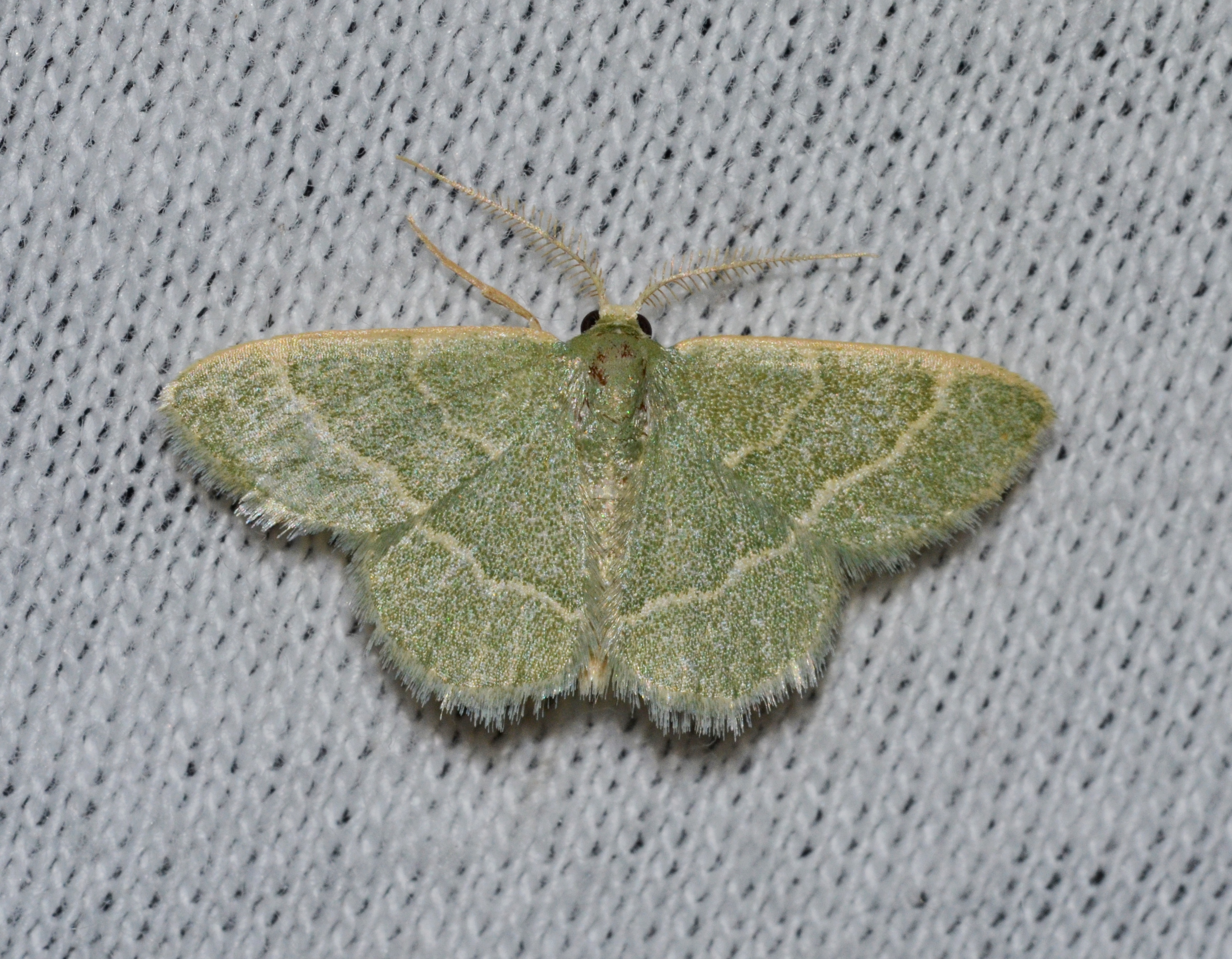

Scientific classification
- Kingdom: Animalia
- Phylum: Arthropoda
- Clade: Pancrustacea
- Class: Insecta
- Order: Lepidoptera
- Family: Geometridae
- Genus: Chlorochlamys
- Species: C. phyllinaria

Binomial name
- Chlorochlamys phyllinaria (Zeller, 1872)

Synonyms
- Eucrostes phyllinaria Zeller, 1872; Chlorochlamys curvifera Prout, 1912; Chlorochlamys fletcheraria Sperry, 1949; Chlorochlamys vertaria Pearsall, 1908; Eucrostes zelleraria Packard, 1876

= Chlorochlamys phyllinaria =

Thin-lined chlorochlamys moth

Species of moth

Chlorochlamys phyllinaria, the thin-lined chlorochlamys moth, is a moth of the family Geometridae. It is found in North America, where it has been recorded from Georgia to California, northward in the central states to Nebraska.

The length of the forewings is 6–9 mm for males and 7–10.5 mm for females. Adults are usually on wing from June to September, but from March to November in the south-west.
