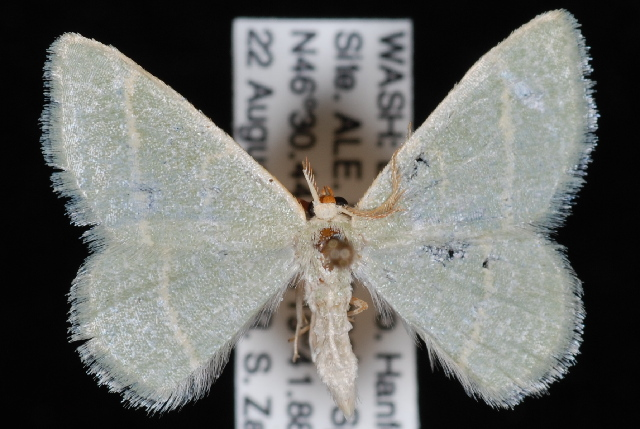

Scientific classification
- Kingdom: Animalia
- Phylum: Arthropoda
- Clade: Pancrustacea
- Class: Insecta
- Order: Lepidoptera
- Family: Geometridae
- Tribe: Hemitheini
- Genus: Chlorochlamys
- Species: C. triangularis

Binomial name
- Chlorochlamys triangularis Prout in Wytsman, 1912

= Chlorochlamys triangularis =

Species of moth

Chlorochlamys triangularis is a species of emerald moth in the family Geometridae. It is found in North America.

The MONA or Hodges number for Chlorochlamys triangularis is 7072.
