= Gutierrezia serotina =

Scientific classification
- Kingdom: Plantae
- Clade: Tracheophytes
- Clade: Angiosperms
- Clade: Eudicots
- Clade: Asterids
- Order: Asterales
- Family: Asteraceae
- Genus: Gutierrezia
- Species: G. serotina

Binomial name
- Gutierrezia serotina Greene 1899

Synonyms
- Gutierrezia polyantha A.Nelson

Species of flowering plant

Gutierrezia serotina is a North American species of flowering plant in the family Asteraceae known by the common name late snakeweed.

It is endemic to Arizona in the United States.

== Description ==
Gutierrezia serotina is a perennial herb or subshrub up to 30 cm (1 foot) in height. Leaves are very narrow, sometimes thread-like.

At the end of each branch there is an inflorescence of one or a few flower heads. The heads are larger than for most of the species in the genus. The head contains 8-17 disc florets with 4-9 yellow ray florets around the edge.
