= Gutierrezia arizonica =

Scientific classification
- Kingdom: Plantae
- Clade: Tracheophytes
- Clade: Angiosperms
- Clade: Eudicots
- Clade: Asterids
- Order: Asterales
- Family: Asteraceae
- Genus: Gutierrezia
- Species: G. arizonica

Binomial name
- Gutierrezia arizonica (A.Gray) M.A.Lane 1980

Synonyms
- Greenella arizonica A.Gray 1880; Xanthocephalum arizonicum (A.Gray) Shinners

Species of flowering plant

Gutierrezia arizonica is a North American species of flowering plant in the family Asteraceae known by the common name Arizona snakeweed. It is native to Arizona in the United States and Sonora in northwestern Mexico.

Gutierrezia arizonica is an annual herb up to 30 cm (1 foot) in height. At the end of each branch there is an inflorescence of one or a few small flower heads just a few millimeters wide. The head contains 16-40 disc florets with 8-15 white ray florets around the edge.
