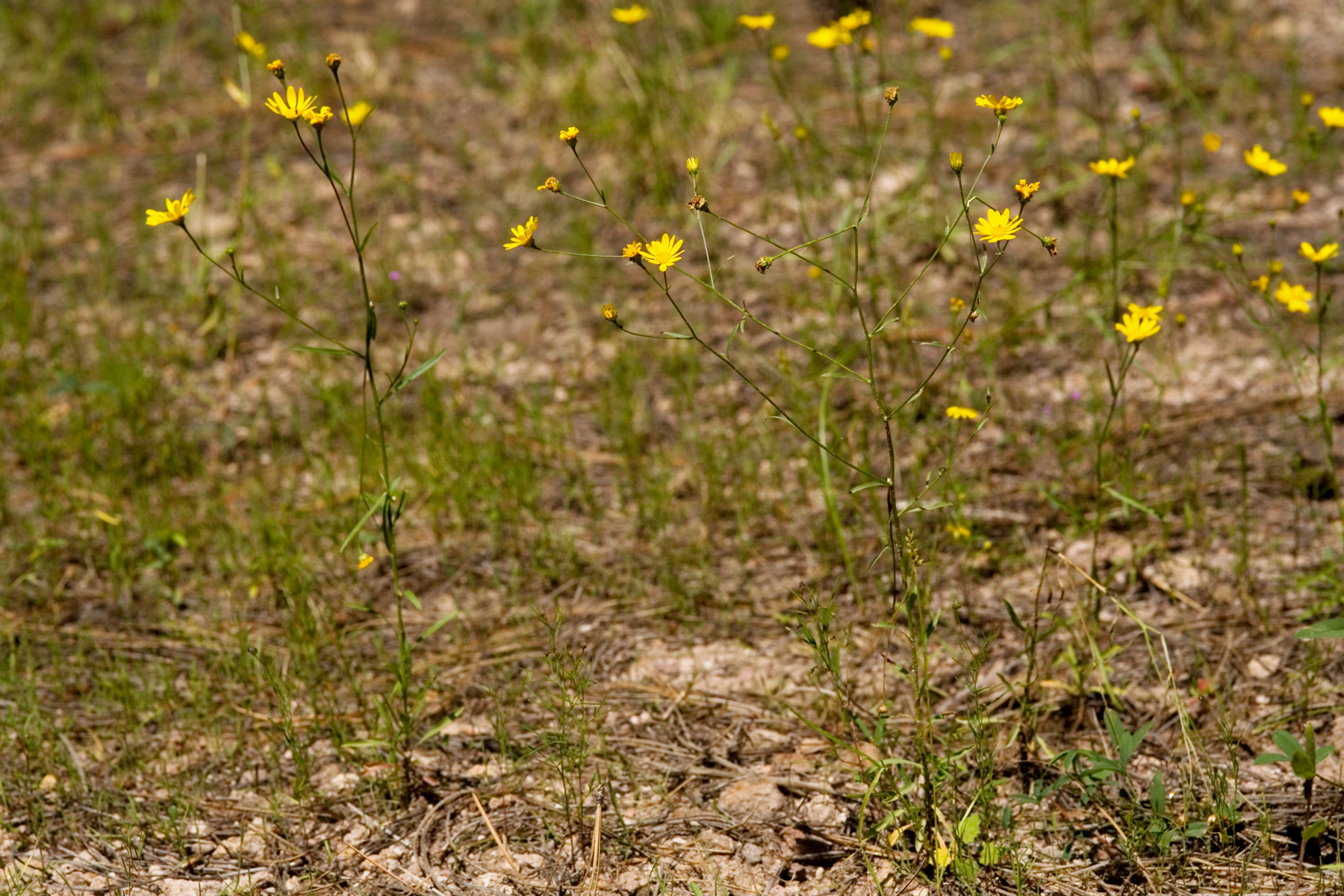

Scientific classification
- Kingdom: Plantae
- Clade: Tracheophytes
- Clade: Angiosperms
- Clade: Eudicots
- Clade: Asterids
- Order: Asterales
- Family: Asteraceae
- Genus: Gutierrezia
- Species: G. wrightii

Binomial name
- Gutierrezia wrightii A.Gray 1853

Synonyms
- Greenella discoidea A.Gray; Xanthocephalum discoideum (A.Gray) Shinners; Xanthocephalum wrightii (A.Gray) A.Gray

= Gutierrezia wrightii =

Species of flowering plant

Gutierrezia wrightii is a North American species of flowering plant in the family Asteraceae known by the common name Wright's snakeweed. It is native to the southwestern United States (Arizona and New Mexico) and northwestern Mexico (Sonora, Chihuahua, Sinaloa).

Gutierrezia wrightii is an annual herb up to 200 cm (79 in) in height. Leaves are narrowly lance-shaped, up to 7 cm (2.8 in) long. The plant produces numerous flower heads in loose arrays. Each head contains 30-60 disc florets with 8-19 yellow ray florets around the edge.
