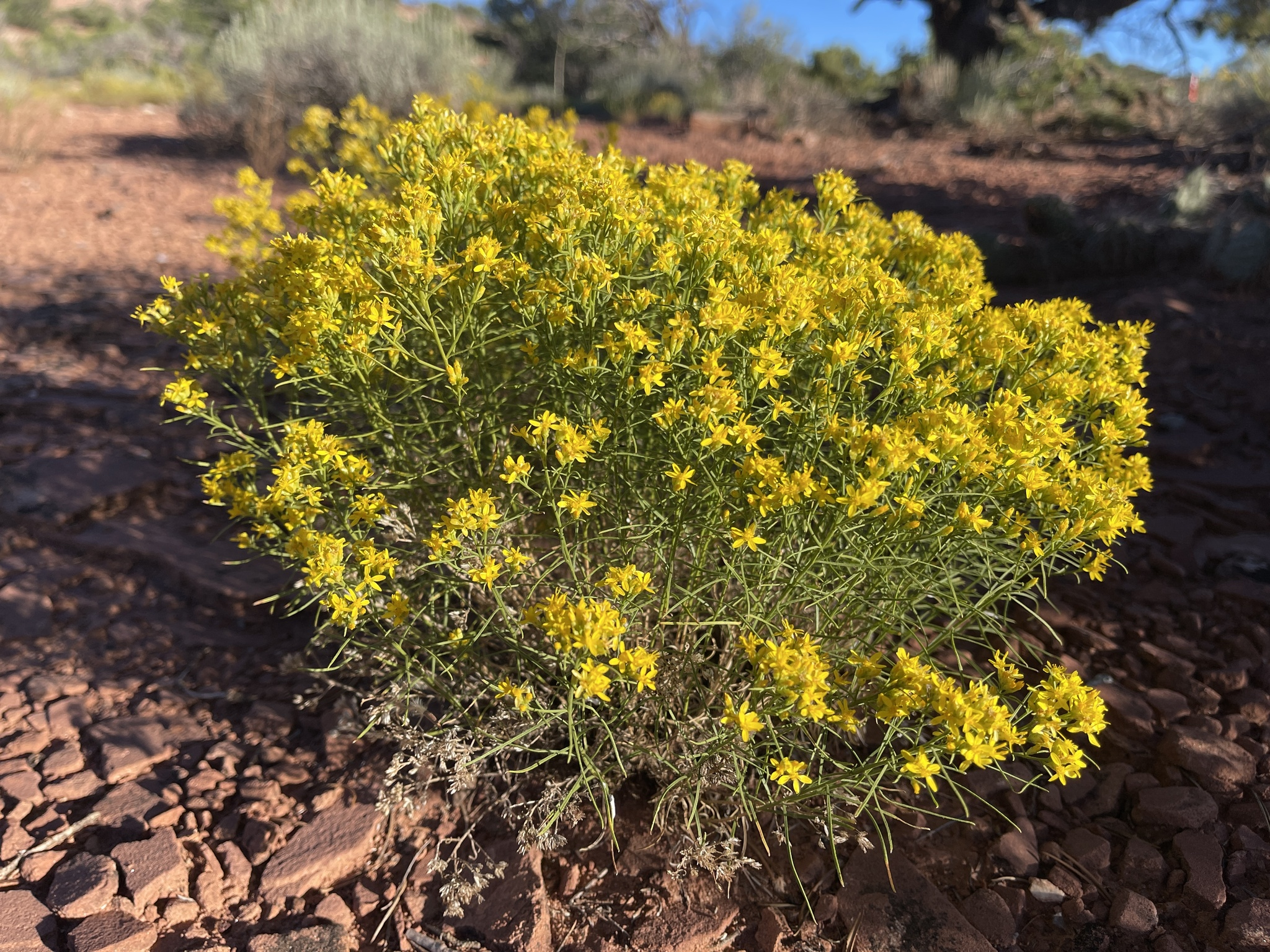
- In Bears Ears National Monument, Utah

Conservation status
- Secure (NatureServe)

Scientific classification
- Kingdom: Plantae
- Clade: Tracheophytes
- Clade: Angiosperms
- Clade: Eudicots
- Clade: Asterids
- Order: Asterales
- Family: Asteraceae
- Genus: Gutierrezia
- Species: G. sarothrae

Binomial name
- Gutierrezia sarothrae (Pursh) Britt. & Rusby

Synonyms
- Brachyris euthamiae; Solidago sarothrae; Xanthocephalum sarothrae

= Gutierrezia sarothrae =

Plant species in the daisy family

Gutierrezia sarothrae is a species of flowering plant in the family Asteraceae known by the common names broom snakeweed, broomweed, snakeweed, and matchweed. It is a subshrub native to much of the western half of North America, from western Canada to northern Mexico, and can be found in a number of arid, grassland, and mountain habitats. It can be toxic to livestock in large quantities, due mainly to the presence of saponins.

The species was utilized by various Native American groups for medicinal and other purposes.

== Description ==
Gutierrezia sarothrae is a perennial subshrub that is typically 10 to 60 centimeters (4 to 24 in) in height, but can sometimes reach as much as 100 cm (39 in). Its stems are brown at their base and are green to tan in color higher up on the plant. They branch freely from the woody caudex at the base forming a rounded shape. The stems die back during dormancy, giving the plant its broom-like appearance. They range from smooth to having some short hairs, and may be resinous and therefore sticky when touched. As the stems are about the same length, this causes the plant to often appear domed or fan-shaped when flowering. The leaves are alternate and linear, and 5 to 63 millimetres (1/4 to 2 1/2 in) long and 1 to 3 mm (1/16 to 1/8 in) wide. The lower leaves are usually shed before the plant flowers. During its first year of growth, the plant produces a long, woody taproot, and numerous lateral roots as the plant matures.

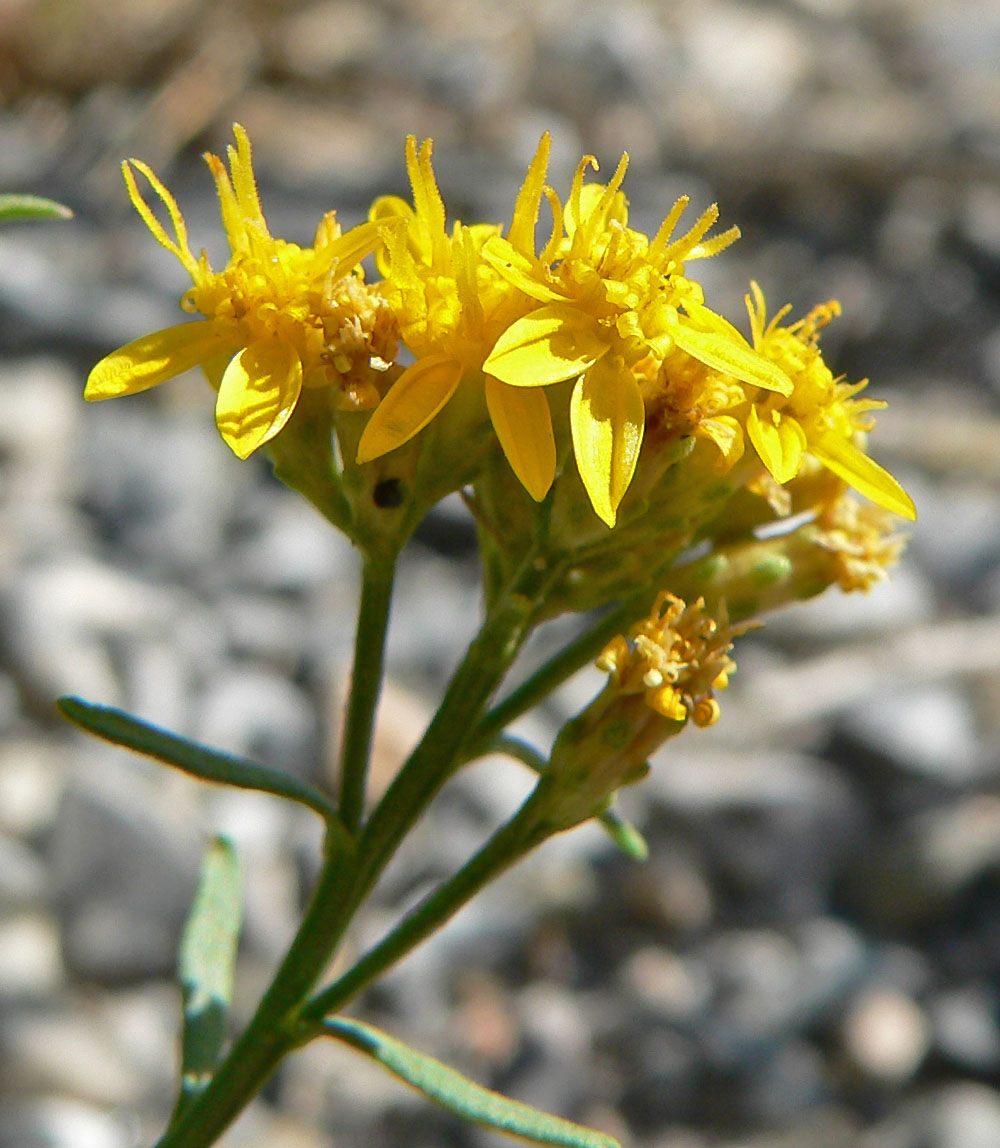
Close-up of flower heads

Dense clusters of 3–7 small, yellow ray and 2–6 tiny disk flowers form in clusters, 3–6 mm (1/8–1/4 in) in length, at the end of the stems from mid-July to September. The flowers are pollinated by various insects, resulting in an oval fruit covered with chaffy scales. The plant reproduces from seeds, which are light, densely hairy, and wind-dispersed. A single plant is capable of producing over 9,000 seeds annually, although most ripe seeds fall beneath the parent plant. Seeds can remain viable in the soil for several years; under laboratory conditions seeds have remained viable for at least two years.

G. sarothrae is commonly confused with rabbitbrush, but can be distinguished by the presence of ray flowers, which rabbitbrush plants do not have. It is also similar to littlehead snakeweed (G. microcephala), which has only 1–3 of both ray and disk flowers.

== Taxonomy ==
Gutierrezia sarothrae was scientifically named and described as Solidago sarothrae by Frederick Traugott Pursh in 1813. It was moved to the genus Gutierrezia by Nathaniel Lord Britton and Henry Hurd Rusby in 1887. It is classified in the Asteraceae. It has no accepted subspecies or varieties, but it has 33 synonyms.

Table of Synonyms
Name	Year	Notes
Brachyachyris euthamiae Spreng.	1826	= het.
Brachyris divaricata Nutt.	1840	= het.
Brachyris euthamiae Nutt.	1818	≡ hom., nom. superfl.
Galinsoga linearifolia Spreng.	1826	= het.
Gutierrezia corymbosa A.Nelson	1936	= het.
Gutierrezia digyna S.F.Blake	1924	= het.
Gutierrezia divaricata Torr. & A.Gray	1842	= het.
Gutierrezia diversifolia Greene	1899	= het.
Gutierrezia euthamiae Torr. & A.Gray	1842	= het.
Gutierrezia fasciculata Greene	1899	= het.
Gutierrezia filifolia Greene	1899	= het.
Gutierrezia fulva Lunell	1910	= het.
Gutierrezia globosa A.Nelson	1936	= het.
Gutierrezia goldmanii Greene	1909	= het.
Gutierrezia greenei Lunell	1910	= het.
Gutierrezia haenkei Sch.Bip.	1855	= het.
Gutierrezia ionensis Lunell	1912	= het.
Gutierrezia juncea Greene	1899	= het.
Gutierrezia laricina Greene	1909	= het.
Gutierrezia lepidota Greene	1899	= het.
Gutierrezia linearifolia Lag.	1816	= het.
Gutierrezia linearis Rydb.	1905	= het.
Gutierrezia longifolia Greene	1899	= het.
Gutierrezia longipappa S.F.Blake	1943	= het.
Gutierrezia microphylla Durand & Hilg.	1854	= het.
Gutierrezia myriocephala A.Nelson	1904	= het.
Gutierrezia scoparia Rydb.	1905	= het.
Gutierrezia tenuis Greene	1899	= het.
Solidago sarothrae Pursh	1813	≡ hom.
Xanthocephalum digynum (S.F.Blake) Shinners	1950	= het.
Xanthocephalum longipappum (S.F.Blake) Shinners	1950	= het.
Xanthocephalum sarothrae (Pursh) Shinners	1950	≡ hom.
Xanthocephalum tenue (Greene) Shinners	1950	= het.
Notes: ≡ homotypic synonym; = heterotypic synonym

== Etymology ==
The genus name, Gutierrezia, was selected by Lagasca, but he did not specify who was being honored. According to research by Kathleen H. Keeler, a likely person associated with the Royal Botanical Garden of Madrid during the time period was Pedro Gutiérrez Bueno (1745-1826). The species name, sarothrae, is related to sarothron, "broom", and sarein, "to sweep", describing the numerous herbaceous branches of this plant.

The common name matchweed refers to the appearance of the stems and flower heads to matches, whereas broomweed refers to its use as a broom and snakeweed refers to its medicinal use to treat snakebites. A related name, sheep weed, is for its folk use as a treatment for sheep bitten by rattlesnakes. It is likewise known as yerba de la vibora, rattlesnake weed, by Spanish speakers. It has also been called turpentine weed due to its odor. An occasional common name for the species is golden broomweed.

== Distribution and habitat ==
A native North American plant, G. sarothrae is found throughout west-central Canada (the Prairie Provinces, the western and central United States (the Great Plains and regions to the west), and northern Mexico as far south as Zacatecas and Baja California Sur. Due to its efficient water use and drought tolerance, it is able to survive in arid and semi-arid sites, such as rocky plains, dry foothills, ridgetops, mountain slopes, and in semi-desert valleys. The species is very adaptable, and can be found in a variety of ecoregions, including pinyon–juniper woodlands, desert shrublands, and sagebrush-grasslands. It can survive in a wide variety of soil types with full sun and good drainage, but growth is reportedly best in clay loams of alluvial slopes, and shallow, rocky, or sandy soil, and is poor in saline or alkaline soils.

== Ecology ==
G. sarothrae is a poor quality browse for most large ungulates. It is important to pronghorn antelope in some areas, especially during spring and summer, and can comprise up to 28% of the pronghorn antelope's diet. The plant is of little value to cattle and horses, but can be a fair quality winter browse for domestic sheep when there is little access to green forage.

Under natural conditions, G. sarothrae quickly invades disturbed areas, and can minimize soil erosion; for example, it is reportedly able to stabilize loose windblown soils in mesquite sand dunes. It has been rated by the U.S. Fish and Wildlife Service as low to medium for erosion control potential, low for short-term revegetation potential, and low to medium for long-term revegetation potential.

=== Management ===
G. sarothrae is one of the most widespread and damaging rangeland weeds, and can displace desirable vegetation if not properly managed. This displacement may be caused by livestock grazing, drought, or fire suppression. The plant quickly invades overgrazed rangeland, as cattle often leave it untouched while overgrazing grasses. Because of this, an abundance of G. sarothrae is considered to be an indicator of rangeland deterioration. It is a fire-intolerant species, and is severely harmed or killed by fire; immediately after a fire it may be completely removed from an area. However, seeds can remain viable if in the soil, often causing G. sarothrae densities to increase after a fire. This may make it necessary to burn at five to ten year intervals in order to reduce its populations.

Herbicide effectiveness is variable; when herbicide application is effective, populations are controlled for up to five years. Mechanical control is generally ineffective; hoeing the plants just below the soil can be effective, but may be impractical in stony soil. Biological control has also been studied, with a combination of an Argentinean root-boring weevil, Heilipodus ventralis, and an Argentinean moth root-borer, Carmenta haematica, found to be an effective method of control.

== Toxicity ==
G. sarothrae can be toxic to domestic sheep, goats, and cattle when consumed in large quantities, although domestic goats are moderately resistant to its effects. Its toxicity is due primarily to saponins, which can cause illness, death, or abortion, as well as to alkaloids, terpenes, and flavonols in the plant. The species is also a facultative absorber of selenium, which can cause illness or death in large amounts. As little as 9 kilograms (20 pounds) of fresh G. sarothrae consumed by cattle in seven days can cause miscarriages, and in cattle, sheep, and goats consuming ten to 20% of their body weight in two weeks can cause death. Toxicity is generally higher during periods of rapid growth, such as early leaf development, and when grown on sandy rather than on calcareous or clay soils.

== Uses ==
G. sarothrae was used by the Native Americans of the Great Plains for various purposes. The Comanche bound the stems together to make brooms. The Blackfoot used the roots in an herbal steam as a treatment for respiratory ailments. A decoction of the plant was used by the Lakota to treat colds, coughs, and dizziness, while a concentrate made from the flowers was used by the Dakota as a laxative for horses. The Navajo rubbed the ashes of the plant on their bodies to treat headaches and dizziness, and also applied the chewed plant to wounds, snakebites, and areas swollen by insect bites and stings. The Zuni used an infusion of the blossoms as a diuretic and to "make one strong in the limbs and muscles", and an infusion of the whole plant was used topically for muscle aches.

=== Cultivation ===
Broom snakeweed is used as a garden plant in xeriscaping for its showy late season blooms. Plants are propagated by seed and do not require cold stratification. Due to being unpalatable to herbivores it is resistant to damage by deer.
