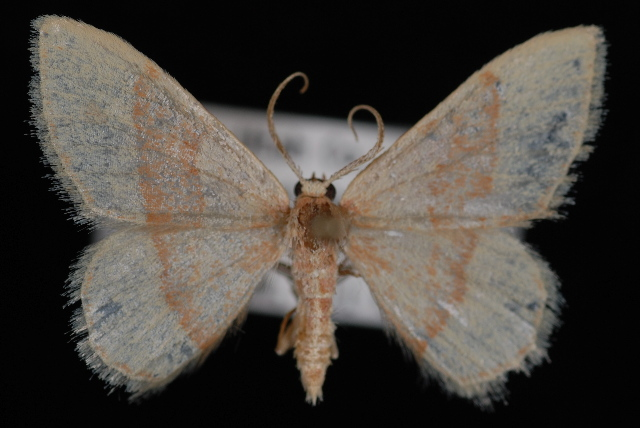

Scientific classification
- Kingdom: Animalia
- Phylum: Arthropoda
- Class: Insecta
- Order: Lepidoptera
- Family: Geometridae
- Genus: Chlorochlamys
- Species: C. appellaria

Binomial name
- Chlorochlamys appellaria Pearsall, 1911

= Chlorochlamys appellaria =

Species of moth

Chlorochlamys appellaria is a species of emerald moth in the family Geometridae. It is found in Central America and North America.

The MONA or Hodges number for Chlorochlamys appellaria is 7073.
