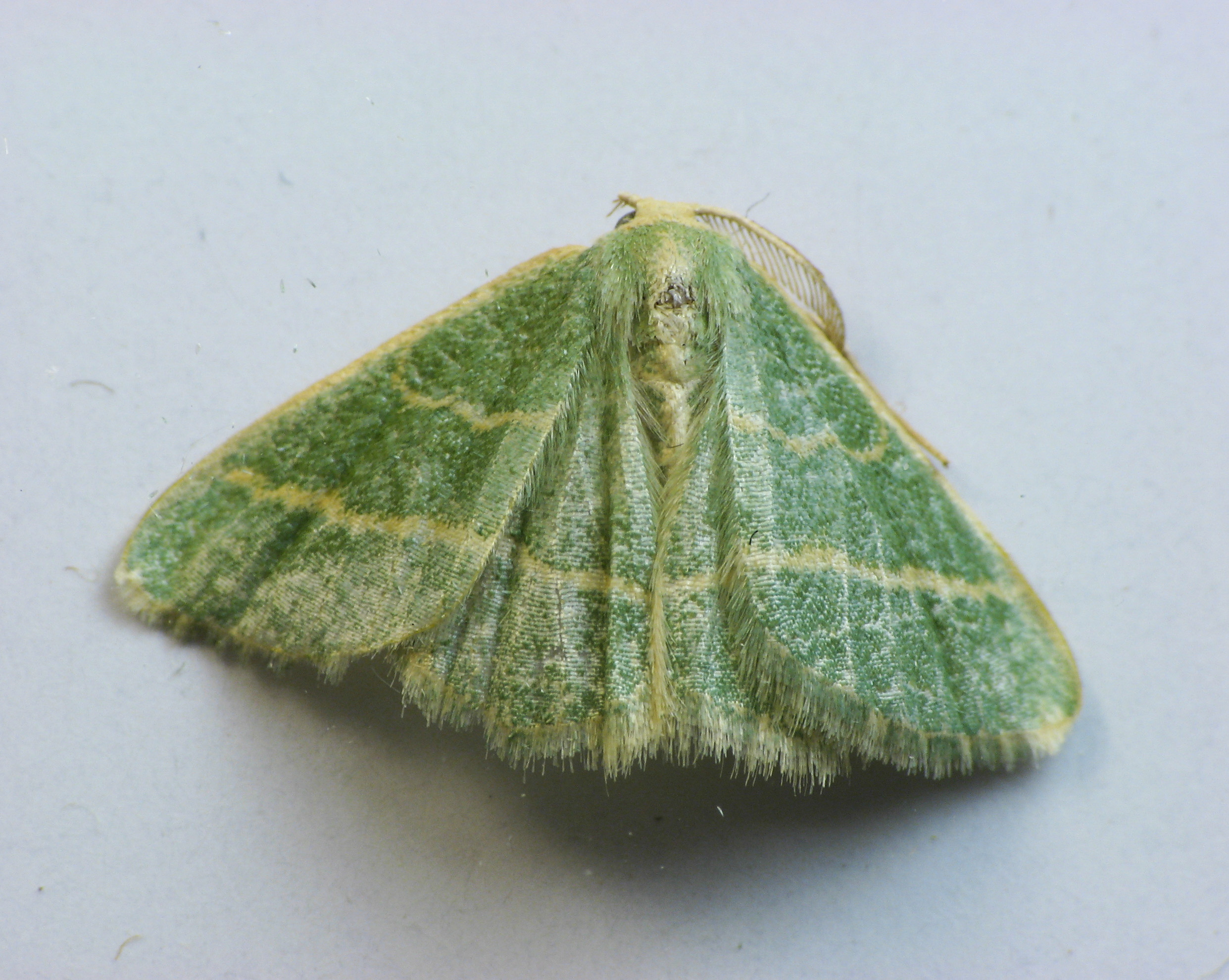
- Chlorochlamys chloroleucaria

Scientific classification
- Kingdom: Animalia
- Phylum: Arthropoda
- Class: Insecta
- Order: Lepidoptera
- Family: Geometridae
- Tribe: Hemitheini
- Genus: Chlorochlamys; Hulst, 1896

= Chlorochlamys =

Genus of moths

Chlorochlamys is a genus of moths in the family Geometridae.

== Species ==
- Chlorochlamys appellaria Pearsall, 1911
- Chlorochlamys chloroleucaria (Guenée, 1857)
- Chlorochlamys phyllinaria (Zeller, 1872)
- Chlorochlamys triangularis Prout, 1912
