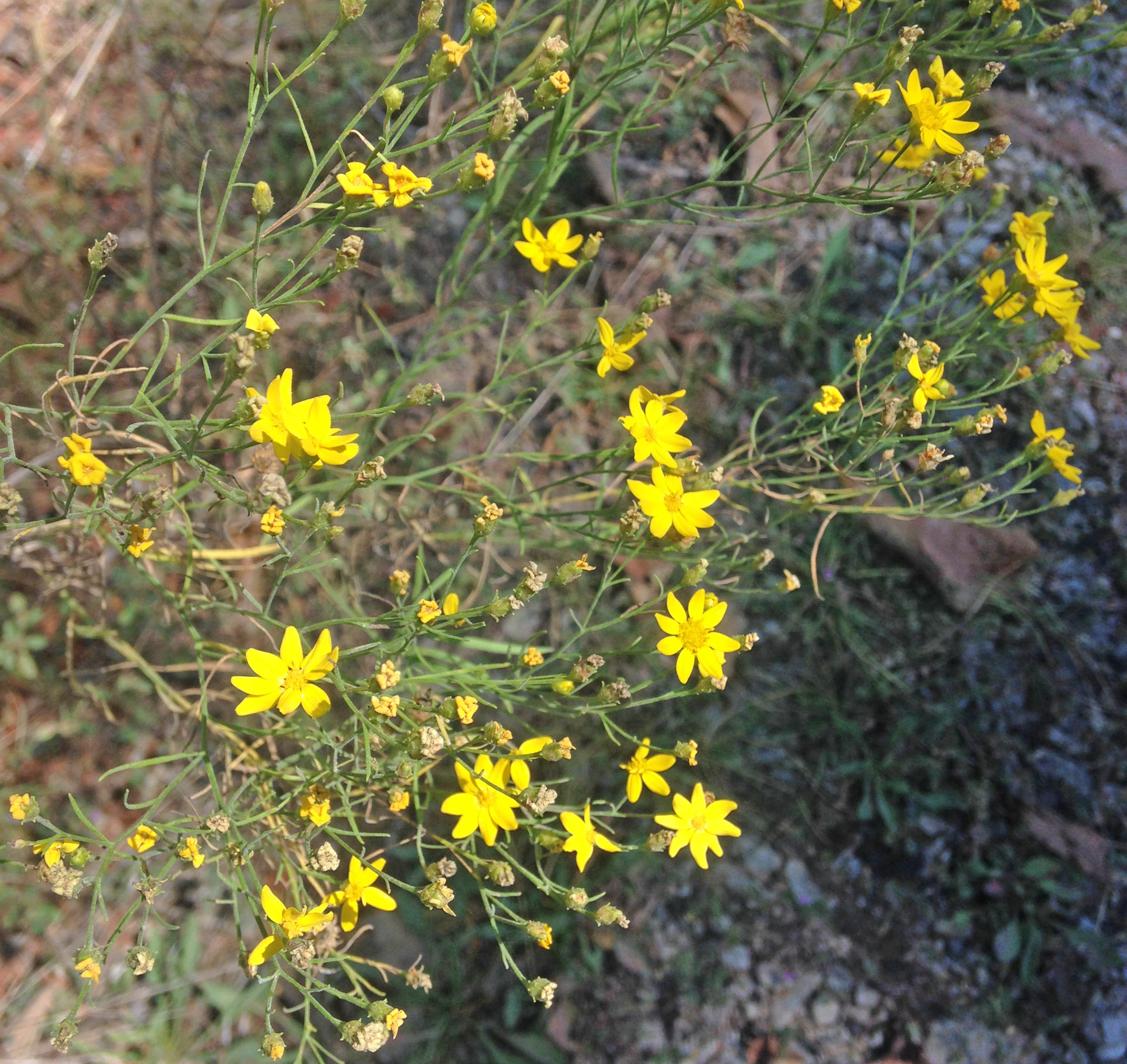

Scientific classification
- Kingdom: Plantae
- Clade: Tracheophytes
- Clade: Angiosperms
- Clade: Eudicots
- Clade: Asterids
- Order: Asterales
- Family: Asteraceae
- Genus: Amphiachyris
- Species: A. dracunculoides

Binomial name
- Amphiachyris dracunculoides (DC.) Nutt.

Synonyms
- Brachyris dracunculoides DC.; Brachyris ramosissima Hook.; Gutierrezia lindheimeriana Scheele; Xanthocephalum dracunculoides (DC.) Shinners

= Amphiachyris dracunculoides =

Species of flowering plant

Amphiachyris dracunculoides, commonly called broomweed, is a North American species of flowering plants in the family Asteraceae. It is native to the United States, primarily the southern Great Plains from Missouri to eastern New Mexico.

Amphiachyris dracunculoides is a tall annual herb occasionally reaching as much as 200 cm (7 feet) in height. The leaves are linear, glabrous, and alternately arranged. Flower heads are yellow, with both ray florets and disc florets. The involucre is made up of 2-3 series of imbricate phyllaries. It is found in calcareous areas, and is tolerant of disturbed habitats.
