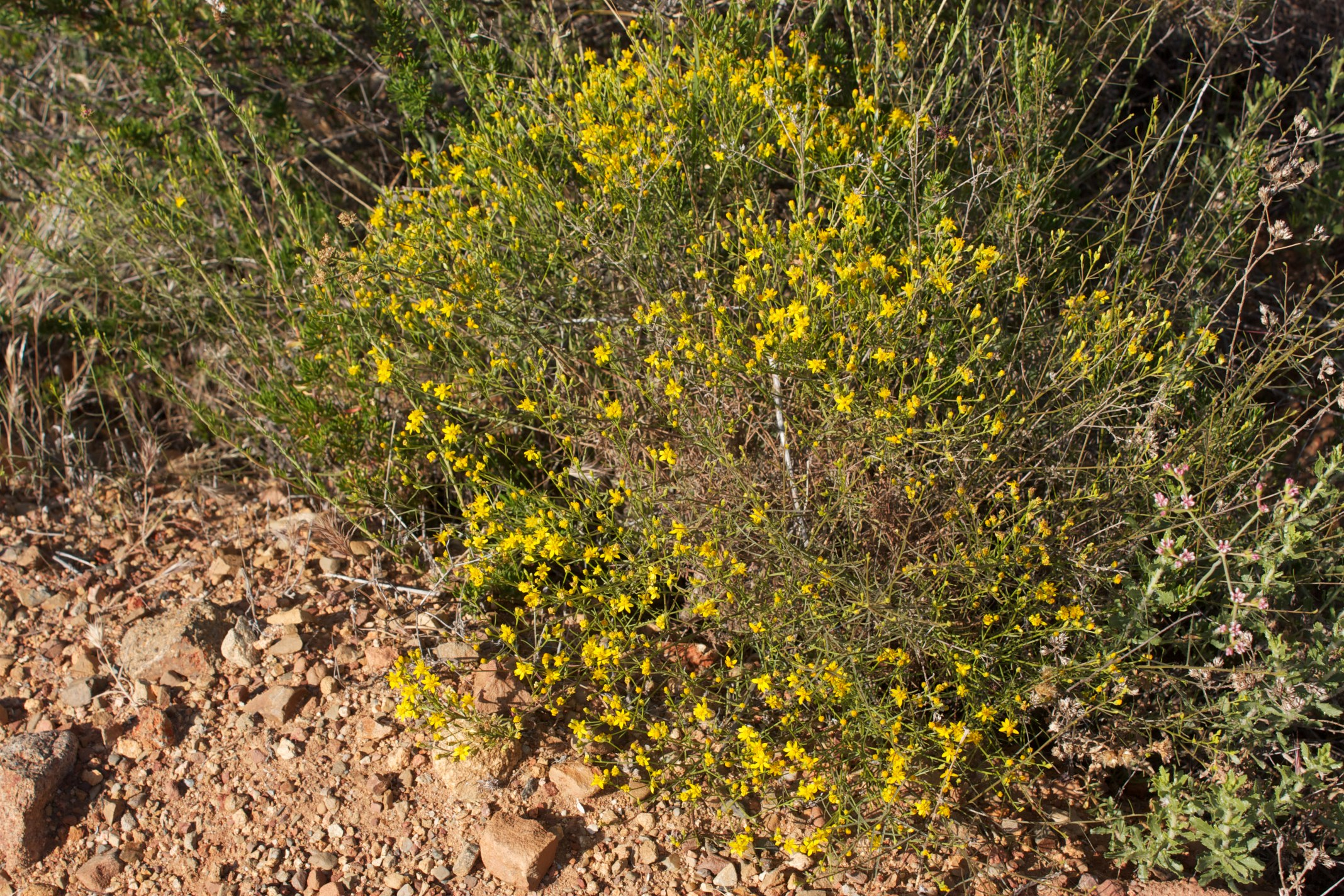

Scientific classification
- Kingdom: Plantae
- Clade: Tracheophytes
- Clade: Angiosperms
- Clade: Eudicots
- Clade: Asterids
- Order: Asterales
- Family: Asteraceae
- Genus: Gutierrezia
- Species: G. californica

Binomial name
- Gutierrezia californica (DC.) Torr. & Gray 1842

Synonyms
- Brachyris californica DC. 1836; Gutierrezia bracteata Abrams; Gutierrezia divergens Greene; Xanthocephalum californicum (DC.) Greene

= Gutierrezia californica =

Species of flowering plant

Gutierrezia californica is a North American species of flowering plant in the family Asteraceae known by the common names San Joaquin snakeweed and California matchweed. It is native to California and Arizona in the United States and Baja California in Mexico. It grows in sunny sandy or rocky areas in grasslands, scrub, or open woodlands.

This is a small subshrub reaching up to about half a meter (20 inches) in height. It grows clumpy or gangly and generally erect stems in shades of gray and red which are lined with small linear green leaves.

At the end of each branch of the stem is an inflorescence of one to three small flower heads just a few millimeters wide. The head contains several yellow disc florets with long, protruding styles and several yellow ray florets around the edge.
