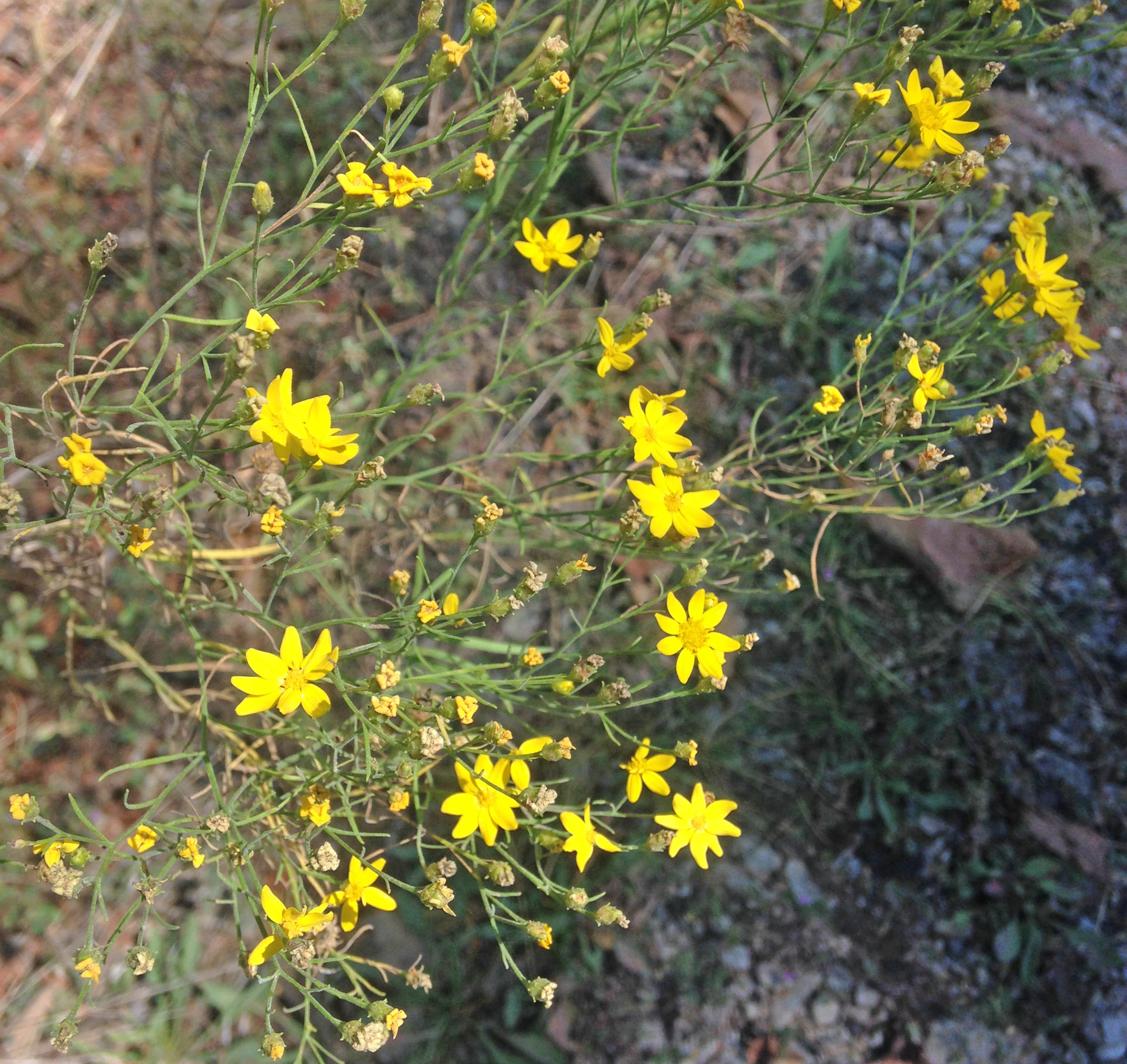

Scientific classification
- Kingdom: Plantae
- Clade: Tracheophytes
- Clade: Angiosperms
- Clade: Eudicots
- Clade: Asterids
- Order: Asterales
- Family: Asteraceae
- Subfamily: Asteroideae
- Tribe: Astereae
- Subtribe: Gutiereziinae
- Genus: Amphiachyris (DC.) Nutt.

Synonyms
- Brachyris sect. Amphiachyris DC.

= Amphiachyris =

Genus of flowering plants

Amphiachyris is a genus of flowering plants in the family Asteraceae described as a species in 1840.

Amphiachyris is endemic to the United States.

Species

- Amphiachyris amoena (Shinners) Solbrig - Texas
- Amphiachyris dracunculoides (DC.) Nutt. - southern Great Plains, with a few scattered populations more east
