= Stephanodoria =

Scientific classification
- Kingdom: Plantae
- Clade: Tracheophytes
- Clade: Angiosperms
- Clade: Eudicots
- Clade: Asterids
- Order: Asterales
- Family: Asteraceae
- Subfamily: Asteroideae
- Tribe: Astereae
- Subtribe: Machaerantherinae
- Genus: Stephanodoria; E.L.Greene
- Species: S. tomentella

Binomial name
- Stephanodoria tomentella (B.L.Rob.) Greene

Synonyms
- Xanthocephalum tomentellum B.L.Rob.

Genus of plants

Stephanodoria is a genus of Mexican plants in the tribe Astereae within the family Asteraceae.

Species

The only known species is Stephanodoria tomentella, native to San Luis Potosí in northeastern Mexico.
