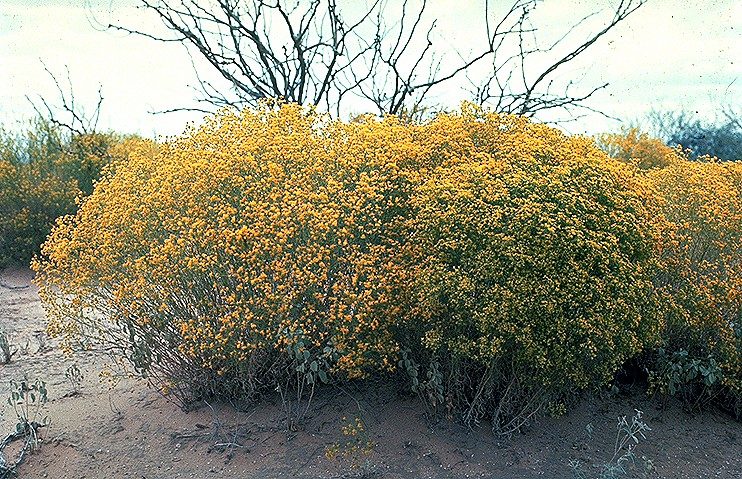
- Gutierrezia sarothrae

Scientific classification
- Kingdom: Plantae
- Clade: Tracheophytes
- Clade: Angiosperms
- Clade: Eudicots
- Clade: Asterids
- Order: Asterales
- Family: Asteraceae
- Subfamily: Asteroideae
- Tribe: Astereae
- Subtribe: Gutiereziinae
- Genus: Gutierrezia; Lag.

Type species
- Gutierrezia linearifolia Lag. (syn of G. sarothrae)

Synonyms
- Brachyris Nutt.; Brachyachyris Spreng.; Greenella A.Gray; Odontocarpha Poepp. ex DC.; Hemiachyris DC.

= Gutierrezia =

Genus of flowering plants

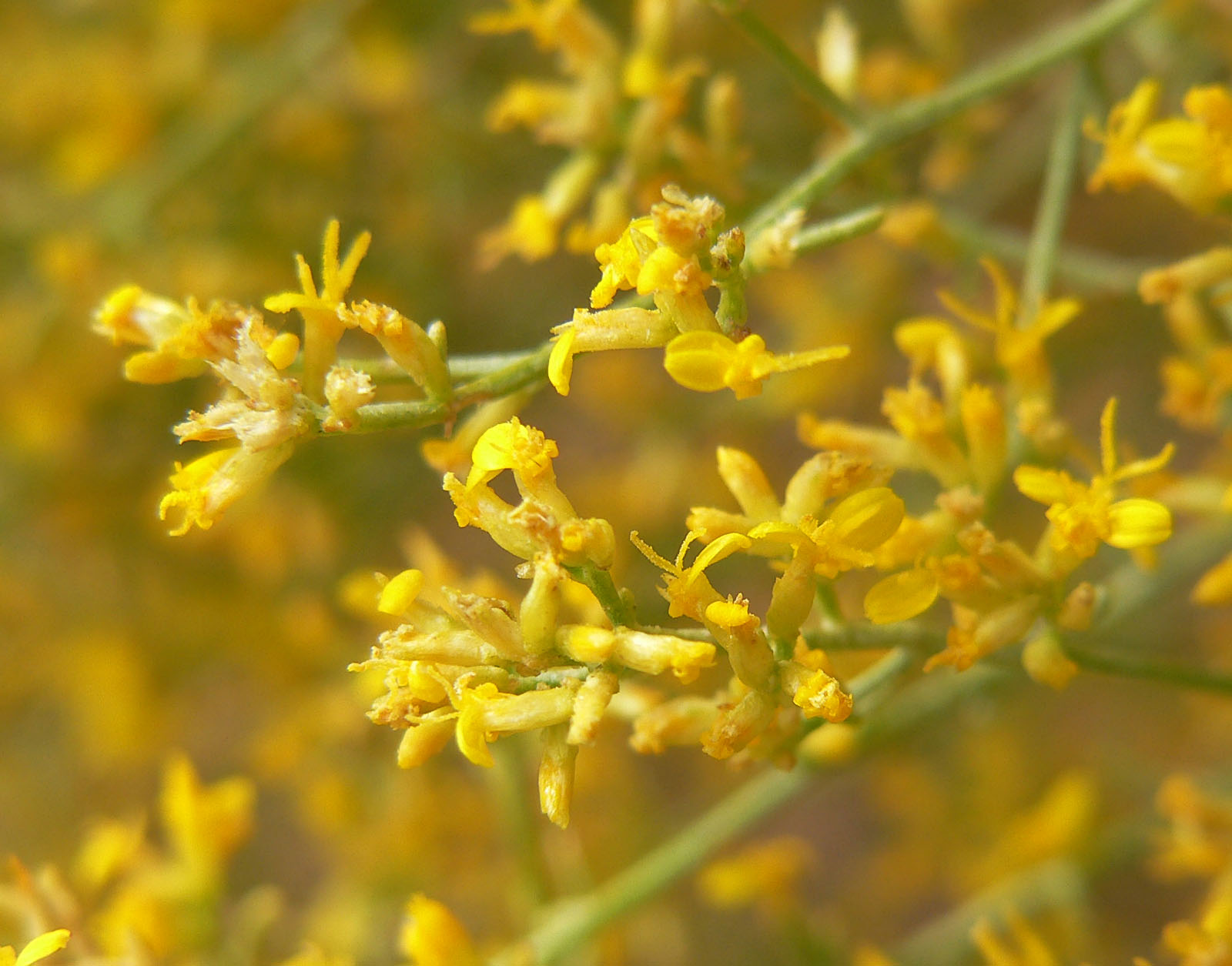
Flower heads of Gutierrezia microcephala

Gutierrezia is a genus of flowering plants in the family Asteraceae, native to western North America and western South America. Plants of this genus are known generally as snakeweeds or matchweeds. Some species have been called greasewood. They are annual or perennial plants or subshrubs with yellow or white flowers.

These plants contain chemical compounds which can be toxic to livestock and some are considered weeds.

Species

- Gutierrezia alamanii - Mexico (Chihuahua)
- Gutierrezia argyrocarpa - Mexico (Hidalgo)
- Gutierrezia arizonica – Arizona snakeweed - USA (Arizona), Mexico (Sonora)
- Gutierrezia baccharoides - Chile, Argentina
- Gutierrezia californica – San Joaquin snakeweed - USA (California, and Yavapai Co, Arizona), Mexico (Baja California)
- Gutierrezia conoidea - Mexico (Chihuahua, Durango, Jalisco, Zacatecas)
- Gutierrezia dracunculoides - USA (from Arizona to Nebraska and Tennessee)
- Gutierrezia dunalii - Mexico (Morelos, México State)
- Gutierrezia elegans - Lone Mesa snakeweed - USA (Colorado)
- Gutierrezia espinosae - Chile
- Gutierrezia gayana - Chile
- Gutierrezia gilliesii - Argentina
- Gutierrezia grandis - Mexico (Nuevo León, Coahuila)
- Gutierrezia isernii - Argentina
- Gutierrezia mandonii - Argentina, Bolivia
- Gutierrezia microcephala – threadleaf snakeweed - southwestern USA, northern Mexico
- Gutierrezia neaeana - Chile
- Gutierrezia paniculata - Chile
- Gutierrezia petradoria – San Pedro snakeweed - USA (Utah)
- Gutierrezia pomariensis - USA (Utah)
- Gutierrezia pulviniformis - Argentina
- Gutierrezia ramulosa - Mexico (Baja California)
- Gutierrezia repens - Argentina
- Gutierrezia resinosa - Chile
- Gutierrezia sarothrae – broom snakeweed - western Canada, western and central USA, northern Mexico
- Gutierrezia sericocarpa - Mexico (San Luis Potosí, Durango, Zacatecas, Guanajuato, Querétaro, Nayarit)
- Gutierrezia serotina – late snakeweed - USA (Arizona)
- Gutierrezia solbrigii - Argentina
- Gutierrezia spathulata - Argentina
- Gutierrezia sphaerocephala – roundleaf snakeweed - USA (Arizona, New Mexico, Texas), northern Mexico
- Gutierrezia taltalensis - Chile
- Gutierrezia texana – Texas snakeweed - USA (New Mexico, Texas, Oklahoma, Louisiana, Arkansas), Mexico (Nuevo León)
- Gutierrezia wrightii – Wright's snakeweed - USA (Arizona, New Mexico), Mexico (Chihuahua, Durango, Sonora)
