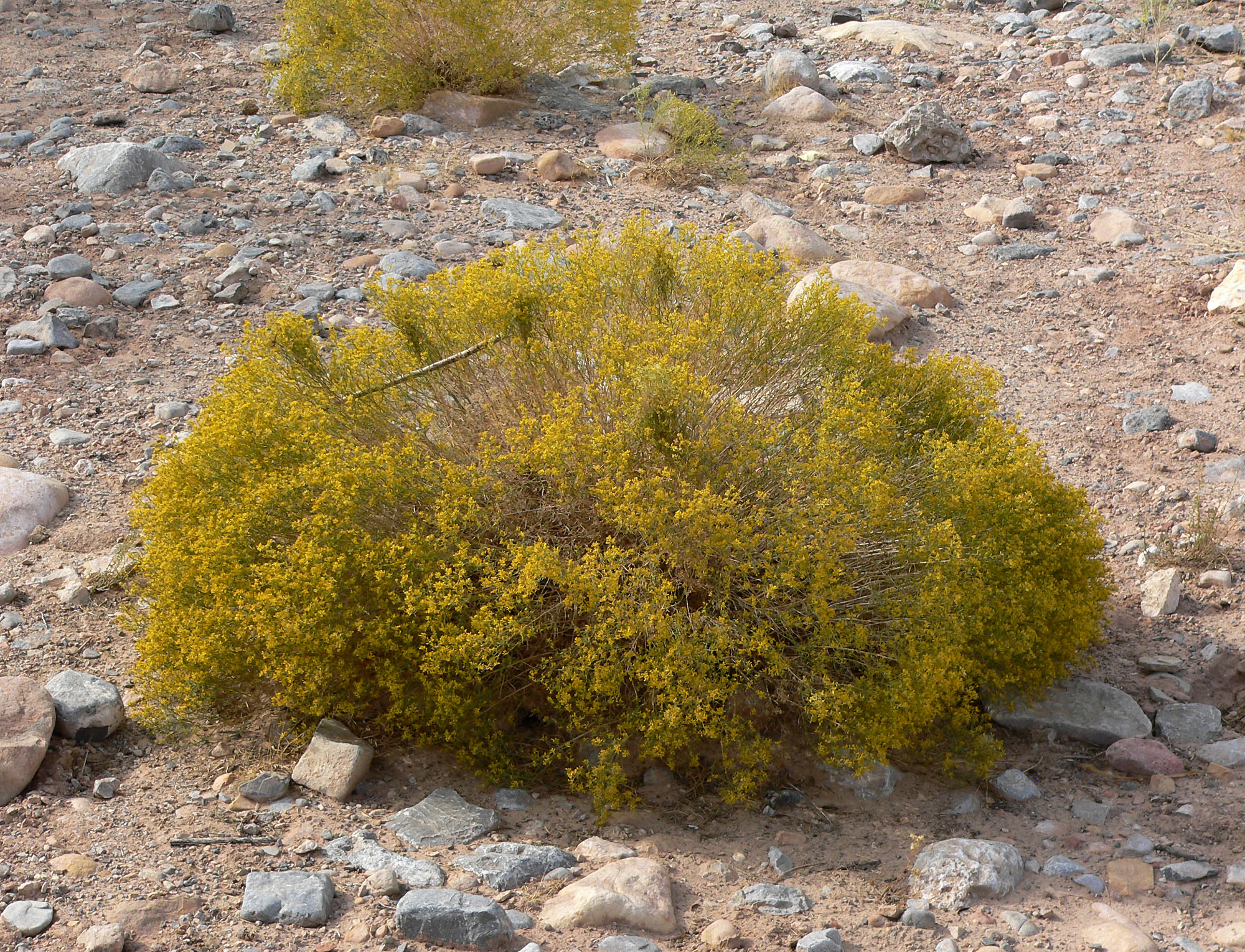

Conservation status
- Secure (NatureServe)

Scientific classification
- Kingdom: Plantae
- Clade: Tracheophytes
- Clade: Angiosperms
- Clade: Eudicots
- Clade: Asterids
- Order: Asterales
- Family: Asteraceae
- Genus: Gutierrezia
- Species: G. microcephala

Binomial name
- Gutierrezia microcephala (DC.) A.Gray

Synonyms
- List: Brachyris microcephala DC.; Gutierrezia euthamiae var. microcephala A.Gray; Gutierrezia glomerella Greene; Gutierrezia linoides Greene; Gutierrezia lucida Greene; Gutierrezia sarothrae var. microcephala (DC.) J.M.Coult.; Xanthocephalum lucidum Greene; Xanthocephalum microcephalum (DC.) Shinners

= Gutierrezia microcephala =

Plant species in the daisy family

Gutierrezia microcephala is a species of flowering plant in the family Asteraceae known by the common names sticky snakeweed, threadleaf snakeweed, threadleaf broomweed, and smallhead snakeweed. It is a subshrub native to the southwestern United States and northern Mexico, and can be found in arid grassland and desert sand dune habitats. It can be toxic to livestock in large quantities, due to the presence of saponins and high concentrations of selenium.

== Botanical description ==
Gutierrezia microcephala is a small, resinous, perennial desert subshrub that is typically 20 to 60 centimetres (7.9 to 23.6 in) in height and less than 100 centimetres (39 in) in diameter. It is heavily branched, often causing it to be nearly spherical. New shoots and twigs are green to yellow in color, and older parts are brown and woody. The leaves are linear, threadlike, and alternate; 1 to 4 centimetres (0.39 to 1.57 in) long and 0.5 to 2 millimetres (0.020 to 0.079 in) wide. Along with the leaves, the stem tissue is photosynthetic, giving the plant a high photosynthetic capacity. G. microcephala typically flowers July to October, but this can vary depending on the amount of precipitation.

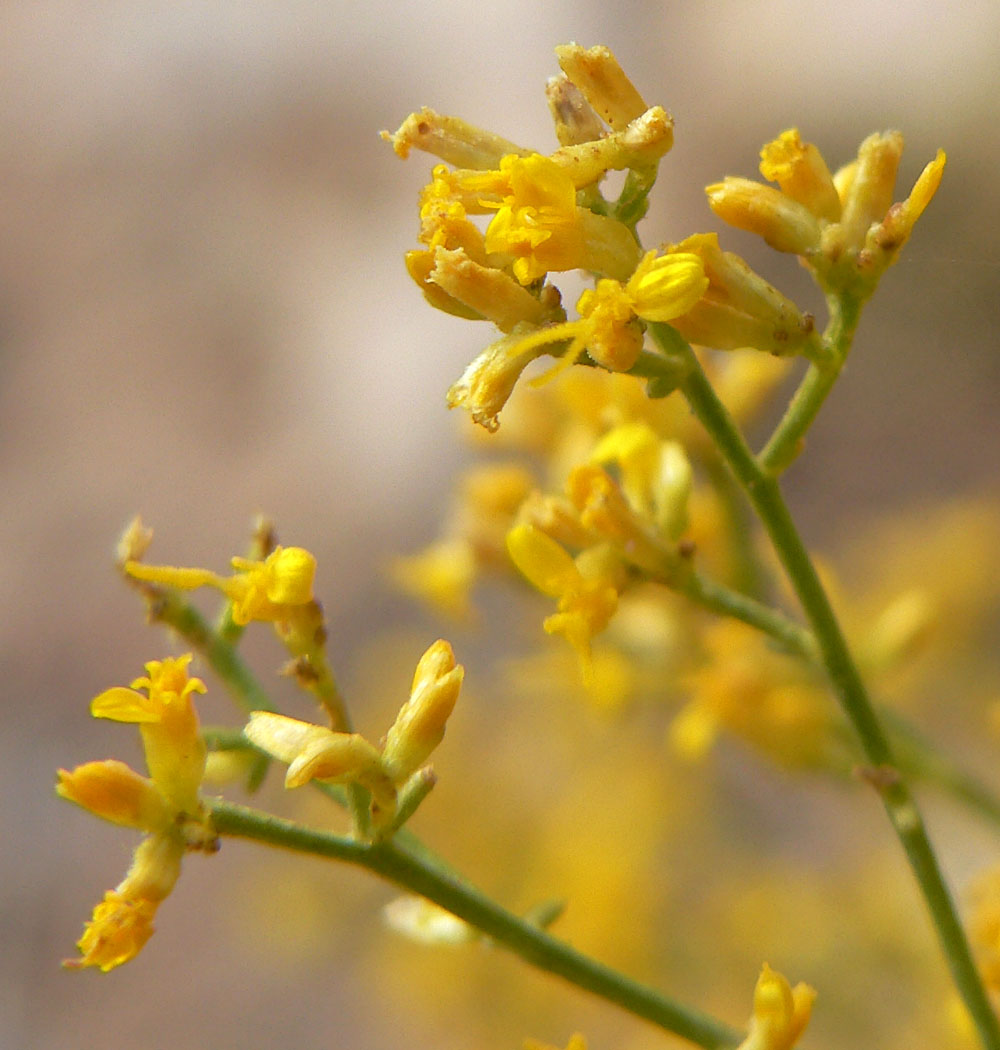
A close up of Gutierrezia microcephala flower heads

When flowering, the tips of stem branches are occupied by sessile inflorescences of 5 or 6 flowers. The knobby, waxy yellow flower buds open into golden yellow flower heads, each of which has one or two disc florets between 2.2 to 3.3 millimetres (0.087 to 0.130 in) in diameter, and one or two ray florets between 2.1 to 3.5 millimetres (0.083 to 0.138 in) in diameter. The mature plants produce many achene, although most seeds fall within a few metres of the parent plant. This is because the plant grows a very small pappus, which makes wind-borne seed distribution very inefficient.

== Habitat ==
Gutierrezia microcephala, a native North American plant, is found throughout the southwestern United States (from California east as far as Texas and Colorado) and northern Mexico (from Baja California to Tamaulipas, Veracruz, and Zacatecas). It occurs in a variety of ecoregions, such as arid grasslands, chaparral, sand dunes, and oak or oak-pine woodlands. G. microcephala is primarily found in well-drained sandy, gravelly, or rocky soils, and is often found in intermittently dry creeks or on the adjacent slopes. It often predominates on shallow, rocky soil, where grasses are not well established.

== Uses ==
Gutierrezia microcephala was used by the Native Americans for various reasons. The Cahuilla used an infusion of the plant as a gargle or placed the plant in their mouths as a toothache remedy. The Hopi and Tewa both used the plant as a carminative, as prayer stick decorations, and for roasting sweet corn, and the Navajo applied a poultice of the plant to the back and legs of horses for unknown reasons. The Zuni steeped the flower heads in boiling water and used the tea as a diuretic, tonic, and sweat-inducer, and also used the plant as an indicator of water.

Gutierrezia microcephala is of little known use to wildlife, and is generally uneaten by livestock except when other forage is unavailable.

== Toxicity ==
Gutierrezia microcephala can be toxic to livestock, especially when grown in sandy soil. Toxicity is due to the presence of saponins, alkaloids, terpenes, and flavonols, as well as high concentrations of selenium; G. microcephala plants have been found to contain selenium levels of 1287 ppm. Toxicity symptoms include abortion and death; as little as 9 kilograms (20 lb) of fresh G. microcephala consumed by cattle in seven days can cause abortions, and in cattle, sheep, and goats consuming ten to twenty percent of their body weight in two weeks can cause death.

== Management ==
Gutierrezia microcephala is one of the most widespread and damaging rangeland weeds, and is an indicator of overgrazed or disturbed rangelands. The herbicides picloram and triclopyr have been found to give satisfactory control, with control lasting at least 5 to 7 years with proper grazing management. Biological control has also been studied, with a combination of an Argentinean root-boring weevil, Heilipodus ventralis, and an Argentinean moth root-borer, Carmenta haematica, found to be an effective method of control.

Fire kills or severely damages G. microcephala, allowing controlled burns to be used in the management of its populations. Burns must be done carefully, as G. microcephala may recolonize burned sites if moisture conditions and competition is favorable, giving mixed success for prescribed burns. Burns can be limited by insufficient amounts fine fuel; if there is enough fine fuel, burns are generally effective if fuel moisture and relative humidity are low, the air temperature is between 24–32 °C (75–90 °F), and there is a gentle breeze.
