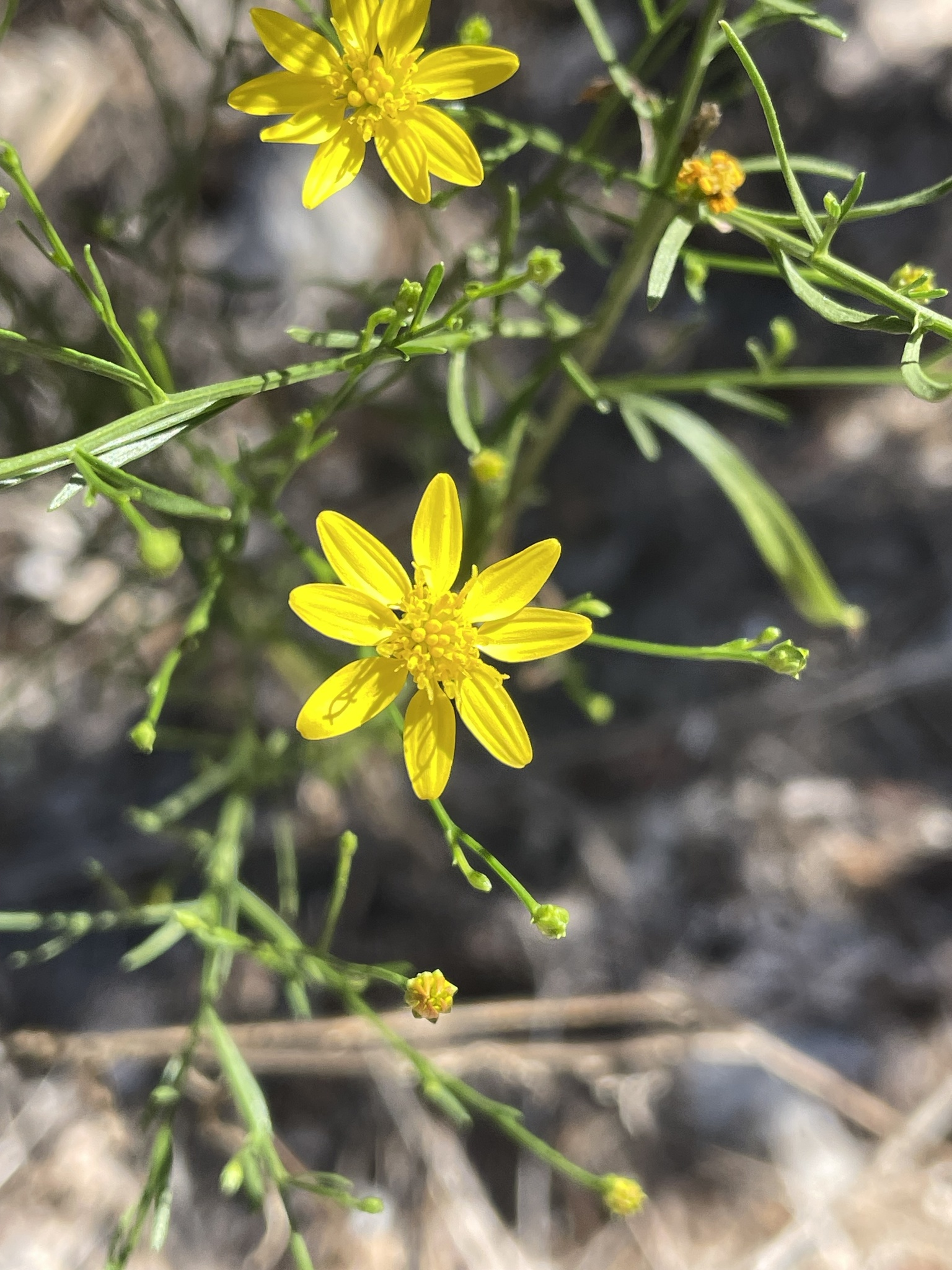

Scientific classification
- Kingdom: Plantae
- Clade: Tracheophytes
- Clade: Angiosperms
- Clade: Eudicots
- Clade: Asterids
- Order: Asterales
- Family: Asteraceae
- Genus: Gutierrezia
- Species: G. texana

Binomial name
- Gutierrezia texana (DC.) Torr. & A. Gray 1842

Synonyms
- Synonymy: Brachyris microcephala Hook. 1837 not DC. 1836; Hemiachyris texana DC. 1836; Xanthocephalum texanum (DC.) Shinners; Gutierrezia berlandieri A.Gray, syn of var. glutinosa; Gutierrezia glutinosa (S.Schauer) Sch.Bip., syn of var. glutinosa; Hemiachyris glutinosa S.Schauer, syn of var. glutinosa; Xanthocephalum sphaerocephalum, syn of var. glutinosa

= Gutierrezia texana =

Species of flowering plant

Gutierrezia texana is a North American species of flowering plant in the family Asteraceae known by the common name Texas snakeweed. It is native to the south-central United States (New Mexico, Texas, Oklahoma, southwestern Arkansas, northwestern Louisiana) and northern Mexico as far south as Guanajuato and Hidalgo.

Gutierrezia texana is an annual, hairless herb up to 100 cm (39 in) in height. The plant produces numerous flower heads in loose arrays. Each head usually has 5-36 ray flowers (though sometimes no rays) plus 7–48 disc flowers.

Varieties

- Gutierrezia texana var. glutinosa (S.Schauer) M.A.Lane
- Gutierrezia texana var. texana
