= Carmenta haematica =

Scientific classification
- Kingdom: Animalia
- Phylum: Arthropoda
- Clade: Pancrustacea
- Class: Insecta
- Order: Lepidoptera
- Family: Sesiidae
- Genus: Carmenta
- Species: C. haematica

Binomial name
- Carmenta haematica (Ureta, 1956)

Synonyms
- Synanthedon haematica Ureta, 1956

Species of moth

Carmenta haematica, the Argentine root borer, is a moth of the family Sesiidae. It was described by Ureta in 1956, and is known from Argentina and Chile.

Adults are day flying and have orange (female) or clear (male) wings with a wingspan of 20–24 mm. Adults emerge in late summer, and larvae develop during the fall, winter and spring.
