= Amphiachyris amoena =

Scientific classification
- Kingdom: Plantae
- Clade: Tracheophytes
- Clade: Angiosperms
- Clade: Eudicots
- Clade: Asterids
- Order: Asterales
- Family: Asteraceae
- Genus: Amphiachyris
- Species: A. amoena

Binomial name
- Amphiachyris amoena (Shinners) Solbrig

Synonyms
- Gutierrezia amoena (Shinners) Diggs, Lipscomb & O'Kennon; Xanthocephalum amoenum Shinners

Species of flowering plant

Amphiachyris amoena is a North American species of flowering plants in the family Asteraceae. It is found only in central and north-central Texas in the United States.
