= C18H32O3 =

The molecular formula C_{18}H_{32}O_{3} may refer to:

- Coronaric acid, or isoleukotoxin
- Densipolic acid, rare fatty acid
- 9-Hydroxyoctadecadienoic acid
- 13-Hydroxyoctadecadienoic acid (13-HODE)
- Vernolic acid (leukotoxin)
