= GPR132 =

Protein-coding gene in the species Homo sapiens

Identifiers
- Aliases: GPR132, G2A, G protein-coupled receptor 132
- External IDs: OMIM: 606167; MGI: 1890220; GeneCards: GPR132

Gene location (Human)
Chr.	Chromosome 14 (human)
Band	14q32.33	Start	105,049,395 bp
Band	14q32.33	End	105,065,445 bp

Gene location (Mouse)
Chr.	Chromosome 12 (mouse)
Band	12|12 F1	Start	112,814,493 bp
Band	12|12 F1	End	112,831,848 bp
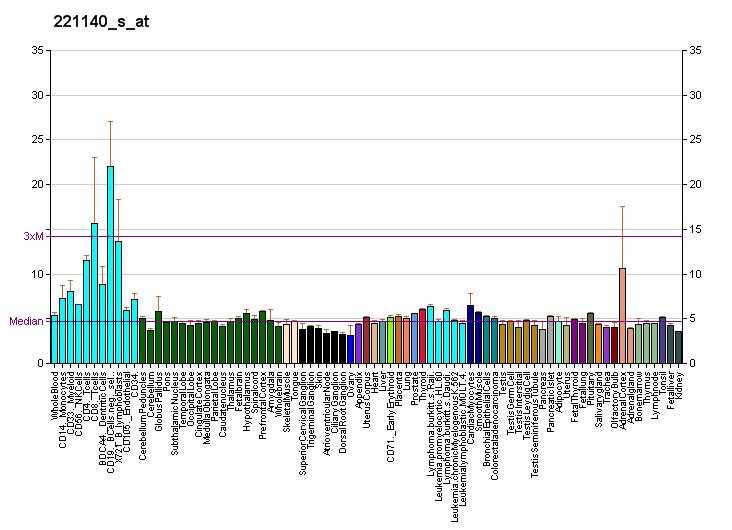
RNA expression pattern
Bgee	Human / Mouse (ortholog); Top expressed in: granulocyte; monocyte; blood; bone marrow cell; spleen; right uterine tube; lymph node; appendix; testicle; upper lobe of left lung / Top expressed in: thymus; mesenteric lymph nodes; granulocyte; blood; pharynx; embryo; spleen; gastrula; lip; esophagus; More reference expression data
BioGPS	More reference expression data
Gene ontology
Molecular function	G protein-coupled receptor activity; signal transducer activity
Cellular component	integral component of membrane; plasma membrane; membrane
Biological process	signal transduction; negative regulation of G2/M transition of mitotic cell cycle; G protein-coupled receptor signaling pathway; G1/S transition of mitotic cell cycle
Sources:Amigo / QuickGO
Orthologs
Databases	NCBI: entry; OMA: entry
Species	Human	Mouse
Entrez	29933	56696
Ensembl	ENSG00000183484	ENSMUSG00000021298
UniProt	Q9UNW8	Q9Z282
RefSeq (mRNA)	NM_013345; NM_001278694; NM_001278695; NM_001278696	NM_019925
RefSeq (protein)	NP_001265623; NP_001265624; NP_001265625; NP_037477	NP_064309
Location (UCSC)	Chr 14: 105.05 – 105.07 Mb	Chr 12: 112.81 – 112.83 Mb
PubMed search
- Wikidata
View/Edit Human	View/Edit Mouse

G protein coupled receptor 132, also termed G2A, is classified as a member of the proton sensing G protein coupled receptor (GPR) subfamily. Like other members of this subfamily, i.e. GPR4, GPR68 (OGR1), and GPR65 (TDAG8), G2A is a G protein coupled receptor that resides in the cell surface membrane, senses changes in extracellular pH, and can alter cellular function as a consequence of these changes. Subsequently, G2A was suggested to be a receptor for lysophosphatidylcholine (LPC). However, the roles of G2A as a pH-sensor or LPC receptor are disputed. Rather, current studies suggest that it is a receptor for certain metabolites of the polyunsaturated fatty acid, linoleic acid.

== The G2A gene ==
G2A in humans is encoded by the GPR132 gene. The G2A gene is located on chromosome 14q32.3 codes for two alternative splice variants, the original one, G2A-a, and G2A-b, that consist of 380 and 371 amino acids, respectively; the two receptor variants, when expressed in Chinese hamster ovary cells, gave very similar results when analyzed for functionality. G2A-a and G2A-b mRNA are expressed at similar levels in blood leukocytes ( macrophages, dendritic cells, neutrophils [PMN], mast cells, T lymphocytes and B lymphocytes at the highest levels followed by lower levels in spleen, lung and heart tissues; both variants are expressed at similar levels, and are almost equally induced by DNA synthesis inhibitors (hydroxyurea and cytosine arabinoside) or a differentiation inducer (all-trans retinoic acid) in HL-60 human leukemic cells.

The mouse G2A receptor, encoded by Gpr132, has 67% amino acid identity to human G2A but does not sense pH and does not respond to certain presumptive ligands (i.e. linoleic acid metabolites) that activate the human G2A.

== G2A deficiency in mice ==
Targeted disruption of G2A in mice causes the development of a late onset (> 1 year) slowly progressive wasting and autoimmune disease characterized by lymphoid organ enlargement, lymphocytic infiltration into various tissues, glomerular immune complex deposition, and anti-nuclear autoantibodies. Mice transplanted with bone marrow cells containing the BCR-ABL leukemia-inducing fusion gene but deficient in G2A exhibit expanded populations of leukemic cells compared to recipients of BCR-ABL-containing, G2A-sufficient bone marrow cells. BCR-ABL is the oncogene of the Philadelphia chromosome that causes human Chronic myelogenous leukemia and is sometimes found associated with human acute lymphocytic leukemia and acute myelocytic leukemia; furthermore, the forced expression of BCR-ABL in cultured rodent cells induces the expression of G2A and the overexpression of G2A inhibits the malignant growth to these cells. Thus, the G2A deficiency studies suggest that G2A functions in mice to suppress certain immune dysfunctions and BCR-ABL-related leukemic cell growth.

== G2A function ==
=== pH sensor ===
G2A was initially defined as one of the gene products whose production was stimulated in mouse pre-B lymphocytes (see Immunoglobulin heavy chain) by transfecting the cells with the human oncogene (i.e., cancer causing) BCR-ABL or by treating the cells with DNA damaging agents; its expression in these cells blocked their progression through the cell cycle specifically at the G2-M DNA damage checkpoint. These studies allow that G2A limits the potentially malignant growth of certain cells in mice and possible could do so in humans. In addition, Gene knockout studies in mice find G2A to be necessary for suppressing an autoimmune syndrome (see G2A deficiency in mice). These results allow that G2A may function in blocking certain aspects of autoimmunity, particularly those involving the proliferation and tissue trafficking of lymphocytes. Early studies first classified G2A as a proton-sensing receptor and suggested that G2A contributed to the regulation of proliferation in certain cells and the regulation of lymphocytes' contributions to certain immune functions by being activated by changes in extracellular pH. Tissues suffering malignant cell growth, autoimmune reactions, poor blood flow ischemia, inflammation and allergy reactions, and tissue injury develop extracellular acidification due to the stimulation of anaerobic glycolysis; The proton-sensing function of G2A could be involved in combating or, in certain cases promoting these conditions. An example implicating G2A's pH sensitivity in physiological responses involves pain perception. In rats, G2A, similar to other pH sensing GPCRs, is located in dorsal root ganglia neurons, small diameter neurons responsible for nociception, and other nerve tissues responsible for sensing pain; it is suggested that G2A in these nerve tissues detects the acid changes that occur in the extracellular media of injured tissues and signal for the perception of pain

However, the activity of the human G2A receptor and its mouse homolog are significantly less sensitive to pH fluctuations than other pH sensing GPCRs; indeed, in studies of thymocytes and splenocytes taken from mice deficient in either the G2A or another pH-sensing GPCR, TDAG8, TDAG8 was found critical while G2A was found dispensable for sensing pH changes. Thus, the cited functions of G2A presumed due to its pH sensing ability could reflect other means for this receptor's activation.

=== Receptor for lyso-phospholipids ===
A report working with human neutrophils proposed that G2A was a receptor for a phospholipid, lysophosphatidylcholine (LPC), and a Sphingomyelin, sphingosylphosphorylcholine. However, these studies did not give evidence that these lyso-phospholipids actually bound to G2A; some 4 years later this report was withdrawn. Nonetheless, many of LPC's activities do depend on G2A; more recent data suggest that rather than acting directly as a ligand that binds to G2A, LPC alters G2A's distribution within the cell by increasing its movement from the cell interior to the cell surface and/or by preventing its movement away from the cell surface to the cell interior. That is, in neutrophils and other cell types which have internal stores of G2A in membrane-bound secretory vesicles, G2A-containing vesicles continuously merge with and move back out of a cell's surface membrane. Lyso-phospholipids may act as a)) detergents to increase a cell's permeability thereby allowing entry of small extracellular molecules such as ionic calcium which trigger the movement of the intracellular vesicles to the surface membrane or b) agents that intercalate or wedge into the cell's surface membrane to promote this vesicle movement or slow this vesicle movement out of the membrane . Such effects increase the expression of G2A at the cell surface membrane which, if G2A has a sub-stimulatory level of activity when normally express but stimulatory when it is overexpressed at the surface membrane, may lead to G2A-dependent cellular responses. With respect to this view, small decreases in extracellular pH reduce the internalization of G2A thereby increasing its surface membrane expression.

LPCs that contain the unsaturated fatty acids hexadecanoic acid or octadecanoic acid bound to their sn-1 act to permeablize, while LPC with the monounsaturated fatty acid, oleic acid at sn-1 act to perturb target cell surface membranes. While not involving G2A receptor binding, some actions of LPCs are G2A-dependent. For example, LPCs increase the bactericidal activity of rodent neutrophils, enhance hydrogen peroxide production in rodent neutrophils triggered by the ingestion of bacteria, stimulate the chemotaxis of human monocytes, and protect mice from the lethal effects of experimentally induced bacterial sepsis endotoxin. G2A may similarly be responsible for the activities of other phospholipids which, like LPC have not been shown to bind to G2A but still require G2A for certain of their activities viz., lysophosphatidylserine and lysophosphatidylethanolamine; these two lyso-phospholipids stimulate calcium signaling pathways in human neutrophils by a G2A dependent mechanism. Furthermore, activated neutrophils greatly increase their surface membrane content of lysophosphatidylserine. In a mouse model, mouse neutrophils with increased levels of lysophosphatidylserine on their surface membrane due to cell activation or artificial addition showed an increase in there engulfment by mouse macrophages in vitro that was dependent on the expression of G2A in the macrophages and an increased rate of clearance in mice by a mechanism that was dependent on the expression of G2A by the mice. Lysophosphotidylserine-laden neutrophils stimulated the G2A-dependent production the proinflammatory mediator, prostaglandin E2, by macrophages in the in vitro studies and inhibited the production of pro-inflammatory mediators, interleukin-6 and keratinocyte chemoattractant, for in vivo studies. G2A is also involved in blood-borne lysophosphatidylcholine (LPC) mediated amplification of microbial TLR ligands induced inflammatory responses from human cells. Taken together, these studies suggest that G2A, activated by certain phospholipids contributes not only to the development but also the resolution of certain inflammation and innate immune responses in mice and may also do so in humans.

=== Receptor for fatty acid metabolites ===
The linoleic acid metabolites, 9(S)-hydroxyoctadecadienoic acid (HODE), 9(R)-HODE, and 13(R)-HODE, and the arachidonic acid metabolites 5(S)-hydroxyicosatetraenoic acid (HETE), 12(S)-HETE, 15(S)-HETE, and racemic 5-HETE, 12-HETE, 15-HETE, 8-HETE, 9-HETE, and 11-HETE stimulate Chinese hamster ovary cells made to express G2A; these effects, unlike those of phospholipids, appear to involve and require the binding of the metabolites to G2A as evidenced by the ability of the most potent of these metabolites, 9-HODE to stimulate G2A-dependent functions in membranes isolated from these cells. 9-HODE induces cultured normal human epidermal keratinocytes to stop growing by inhibiting their cell cycle at the G_{1} stage; it also stimulates these cells to secrete three cytokines that stimulate keratinocyte growth vis., interleukin-6, interleukin-8, and GM-CSF. These activities are G2A-dependent. It is suggested that 9-HODE acts in human skin to block the proliferation of damaged cells while concurrently, by triggering the secretion of the cited cytokines, stimulating the proliferation of undamaged skin cells; these actions may thereby serve to rejuvenate skin damaged for example by UV light.

== See also ==
- Proton-sensing G protein-coupled receptors
