= Hydroxyoctadecadienoic acid =

Hydroxyoctadecadienoic acid may refer to:

- 9-Hydroxyoctadecadienoic acid
- 13-Hydroxyoctadecadienoic acid
