= G2A (disambiguation) =

G2A may refer to:

- G2A - a video games website.
- LNWR Class G2A
- Haplogroup G2a
- A version of the Soko G-2 Galeb
- A G protein-coupled receptor that is also termed GPR132
