= Psychosine sulfotransferase =

Class of enzymes

Identifiers
- EC no.: 2.8.2.13
- CAS no.: 37259-76-0

Databases
- BRENDA: enzyme data
- ExPASy: NiceZyme view
- KEGG: enzyme entry
- MetaCyc: metabolic pathway
- Rhea: reactions
- PDB structures: RCSB PDB PDBe PDBsum
- Gene Ontology: AmiGO / QuickGO
Search
- PMC: articles
- PubMed: articles
- NCBI: proteins

Psychosine sulfotransferase (EC 2.8.2.13) is an enzyme that catalyzes the chemical reaction:

psychosine
+ PAPS
psychosine sulfate
+ adenosine
3',5'-bisphosphate

The reaction converts the cytotoxic lipid psychosine, derived from sphingosine, to a sulfate product by transferring a sulfate group from the cofactor 3'-phosphoadenosine-5'-phosphosulfate (PAPS) and giving adenosine 3',5'-bisphosphate as a byproduct. The enzyme was characterised from mouse brain.

This enzyme is a transferase, specifically a sulfotransferases, which transfer sulfur-containing groups. The systematic name of this enzyme class is 3'-phosphoadenylyl-sulfate:galactosylsphingosine sulfotransferase. Other names in common use include PAPS:psychosine sulphotransferase, and 3'-phosphoadenosine 5'-phosphosulfate-psychosine sulphotransferase.
