= Antioxidative stress =

Overabundance of bioavailable antioxidant compounds

Antioxidative stress is an overabundance of bioavailable antioxidant compounds that interfere with the immune system's ability to neutralize pathogenic threats. The fundamental opposite is oxidative stress, which can lead to such disease states as coronary heart disease or cancer.

Antioxidant compounds reduce reactive oxygen species (ROS), which reduces emitted free-radicals. When ROS function is impaired, there is more susceptibility to atopic disorders or diseases due to impairment of the attack-kill-present-respond behavior of the Th-1 immune response chain. Over-consumption of antioxidants could thus lead to antioxidative stress, where antioxidants might weaken or block the adaptive stress responses and cause dangerous health conditions and cause harm.

== Health effects ==
The concept of antioxidative stress may best be described by excessive or detrimental nutritional consumption of a diet rich in antioxidants, unbalancing the immune systems' pathogenic response processes. Serious health conditions can result if these processes are chronically unbalanced, ranging from acute to chronic. Immunological stress by over-supplementation of antioxidants facilitates adverse health effects specifically including allergies, asthma, and physiological alterations (especially of the skin).

Many foods contain antioxidant content, while numerous dietary supplements are exceptionally rich in antioxidants. Products marketed with health benefits routinely tout antioxidant content as a beneficial product aspect without consideration of overall dietary oxidative balances. This is generally due to the biological effects of antioxidants being misunderstood in popular culture, focusing only on their beneficial qualities to reduce ROS to prevent excessive free-radicals which may otherwise lead to well-known disease conditions.

=== Correlation with medical conditions ===
Many antioxidative compounds are also antinutrients, such as phenolic compounds, found in plant foods belonging to the families of phenolic acids, flavonoids, isoflavonoids, and tocopherols, among others. Phenolic compounds found in foods generally contribute to their astringency and may also reduce the availability of certain minerals such as zinc. Zinc deficiency is characterized by growth retardation, loss of appetite, and impaired immune function. In more severe cases, zinc deficiency causes hair loss, diarrhea, delayed sexual maturation, impotence, hypogonadism in males, and eye and skin lesions.

High-dose supplements of antioxidants may be linked to health risks in some cases, including higher mortality rates. For example, high doses of beta-carotene and vitamin E was found to increase the risk of lung cancer and overall mortality in smokers. High doses of vitamin E may increase risks of prostate cancer and one type of stroke. Antioxidant supplements may also interact with some medicines.

=== Role of free-radicals ===
The primary factor in antioxidants causing or promoting the aforementioned health issues, is the attenuation or inactivation of reactive oxygen species (ROS), which immune system responders use to kill or destroy pathogens, mainly bacteria and fungi. ROS produce free-radicals as a by-product of the oxygen burst used to kill pathogens. Excess free-radicals that are not effectively scavenged and collected result in oxidative stress that can also be harmful.

Free-radicals are not the enemy that popular culture has made them out to be, as they aid in proper biochemical signaling that make them necessary in a healthy immune system. Several complex biological free-radical collection systems already exist for the purpose of scavenging, which normally, do not require augmentation by supplementation of antioxidants to function nominally.

=== Role in disease ===
Antioxidants attenuate the Th-1 immune response, responsible for eliminating bacterial and fungal threats, while the Th-2 immune response compensates for a weak Th-1 response by increasing its own responders, which may be not only ineffective, but overall destructive to healthy surrounding tissues, thus harmful. The net result: over-supplementation of antioxidants are a direct, underlying cause of allergenic diseases and skin alterations, spurring signs (objective indications) and symptoms (subjective states) of localized and disseminated medical conditions.

Because of the low-level biochemical nature of these immunological systems and their processes, the consequences of antioxidative stress can result in overlying symptoms, leading or contributing to chronic, co-morbid, localized, and/or disseminated disease states, that are clinically challenging to successfully treat.

A diet rich in anti-oxidants could allow for skin alterations such as acute acne or chronic non-infectious lesions, especially when the Th-1 immune process is persistently compromised by an overload of dietary antioxidant sources, like daily ingesting of vitamin C supplements, for example. Allergenic reactions by invading atopic pathogens, well beyond the scope of microbiota, can become initial factors triggering chronic atopic disease.

When relating to atopic skin conditions caused by chronic antioxidative stress, symptoms similar to Chronic granulomatous disease (CGD) may appear, a disease where phagocytes have an impaired ability to destroy pathogens due to a genetic inability to effectively kill pathogens by ROS, versus supplementation induced inability caused by antioxidative stress.

== Dietary balance ==
Nearly all living creatures consume antioxidants in some quantity. Inadequate consumption of dietary antioxidants can be detrimental. For example, a deficiency of vitamin C is a primary cause of scurvy. Vitamin C can be ingested by eating certain fruits. A dietary balance of oxidants and antioxidants is critical in maintaining optimal health.

There have been studies on antioxidant capacities of various supplements and compounds. However, there has not been a dietary system devised to quantify what levels of oxidants or antioxidants are "healthy". Unfortunately, in laboratory testing, there is no single gold standard assay to determine clinically-accepted antioxidant capacity due to numerous available assay methods, though there are several accepted popular assays that can be merged into a final result to produce a representative antioxidative value. Resulting values are subjective because assay methods comprising a final value can vary drastically between individual assay results.

Additionally, such a value does not highlight prevalence in types of antioxidants compounds over others (like lycopene versus ascorbic acid), meaning that while a resulting content value between two substances may be similar, though the potential overlying resulting effect can differ, making clinical assessments of resulting symptoms highly unreliable as to the underlying condition. However, a Norwegian scientific study created a table of 3139 products over a period of eight years, with normalized values based on a modified assay, giving a more comprehensive picture when comparing a variety of food antioxidant capacities.

While it is not known what constitutes healthy oxidative levels, it is known that regular exercise essentially tightens this balance, by both emitting more ROS, while reducing the capacity of leukocytes for oxidant release. Available antioxidant research has noted the significant challenge in determining what qualifies as oxidative and antioxidative stress, citing a wide range of variables to consider, such as a person's physiology, status, environment, and other factors.

== Precipitating nutritional factors ==
Numerous nutritional substances, compounds, and foods have some degree of antioxidant capacity. High-capacity antioxidants include, but not limited to, vitamins C and E, resveratrol and flavonoids (e.g. wine), Sangre de grado (Croton lechleri) aka Dragons Blood, green and black teas, cloves, cinnamon, most commonly used spices and herbs, mints, several berry and nut species, coffee and chocolates.

Normal intake of antioxidants, traditionally considered staples of healthy food, may exert beneficial properties towards some disease states such as neurological disorders, inflammatory conditions, and depression. However, chronic unbalanced ingestion or high quantity supplementation could result in serious ailments due to the suppression of ROS. Allergies, asthma, bacterial and fungal infections of the skin (alterations) are known conditions that stem from antioxidant stress.

=== Components of antioxidants ===
There are many types of antioxidant compounds. Examples are, but not limited to, Carotenoids (Beta-carotene, Lycopene), Lutein, Manganese, Magnesium, Selenium, Vitamin A (retinol), Vitamin C (ascorbic acid, ascorbates), and Vitamin E (α-Tocopherol, tocotrienols), and many more. These compounds can be found as ingredients in various products, or as components of ingredients, or as broader categorical classifications of components. Determining the compound makeup of a product or ingredient allows for general identification of antioxidant compounds, and thus, the potential antioxidant content a product exhibits.

== Research ==
Because overall research and reporting on antioxidative stress is sparse, a fundamental knowledge gap exists in this medically-significant field. Long-term effects of chronic antioxidant stress are not well-researched. Safe levels of antioxidant consumption have yet to be established in human diets. The lack of overall awareness of the subject has invoked comparatively few clinical or field studies, sparse data and statistics, and may suggest a valuable field of nutritional research has been categorically dismissed or overlooked.

Assays for oxidative stress and antioxidant reserves are offered by at least one diagnostic company. Diagnosing antioxidative stress is currently extremely rare due to factors such as widespread unfamiliarity, lacking proper understanding in the clinical environment, and trivial modern medical training on the subject. Speculatively, when considering the general abundance of oxidative stress-related conditions (e.g. cancer), a comparable statistical population of antioxidative stress-related conditions (e.g. allergies) is hypothetically viable, based upon available documented research regarding the known resulting pathology of antioxidative stress.

== See also ==
- Reductive stress
