= Reductive stress =

Reductive stress (RS) is defined as an abnormal accumulation of reducing equivalents despite being in the presence of intact oxidation and reduction systems. A redox reaction involves the transfer of electrons from reducing agents (reductants) to oxidizing agents (oxidants) and redox couples are accountable for the majority of the cellular electron flow. RS is a state where there are more reducing equivalents compared to reactive oxygen species (ROS) in the form of known biological redox couples such as GSH/GSSG, NADP+/NADPH, and NAD+/NADH. Reductive stress is the counterpart to oxidative stress, where electron acceptors are expected to be mostly reduced. Reductive stress is likely derived from intrinsic signals that allow for the cellular defense against pro-oxidative conditions. There is a feedback regulation balance between reductive and oxidative stress where chronic RS induce oxidative species (OS), resulting in an increase in production of RS, again.

== Implications of reductive stress ==
There are several implications of an excess of reducing equivalents: regulation of cellular signaling pathways by decreasing cell growth responses, modification of transcriptional activity, perturbs disulfide bond formation within proteins, increase of mitochondrial malfunction, decrease in cellular metabolism, and cytotoxicity. The over expression of antioxidant enzymatic systems promote the excess production of reducing equivalents resulting in the depletion of ROS and prompting RS in cells. Nuclear factor erythroid 2–related factor 2 (Nrf2) is an important transcription factor that regulates a multitude of genes that code for antioxidant response and after uncontrolled amplification of this signaling pathway RS increases. Although different organelles may each have a different redox status, through probing for factors such as glutathione and hydrogen peroxide (H_{2}O_{2}), it was determined that reductive stress is present in the endoplasmic reticulum (ER) of senescent cells. Reductive stress is significant in the aging process of a cell and when ER oxidation status is elevated, cellular aging is slowed. In particular, when reductive stress is increased, it may result in many downstream effects such as increased apoptosis, decreased cell survival, and mitochondrial dysfunction—all of which need to be properly regulated to ensure that the needs of the cell are met. Data shows, in an isolated mitochondria, when there is a high ratio of NADH/NAD+, an example of RS, ROS increases significantly in the mitochondrial matrix which results in H_{2}O_{2} spillover from the mitochondria. Reductive stress has even been suggested to lead to higher probability of cardiomyopathy in humans. This has also been mysteriously linked to the abundant presence of heat shock protein 27 (Hsp27), suggesting that high levels of Hsp27 induce can induce cardiomyopathy. Reductive stress is present in many diseases with abnormalities such as the increase of reducing equivalents, resulting in issues such as hypoxia-induced oxidative stress. A more reductive redox environment promotes cancer metastasis and cancer cells use reductive stress to promote growth and resist anti-cancer agents, such as chemotherapy and radiotherapy.

== See also ==
- Antioxidative stress
