= Oxidative stress =

Free radical toxicity

Oxidative stress mechanisms in tissue injury. Free radical toxicity induced by xenobiotics and the subsequent detoxification by cellular enzymes (termination).

Oxidative stress reflects an imbalance between the systemic manifestation of reactive oxygen species and a biological system's ability to readily detoxify the reactive intermediates or to repair the resulting damage. Disturbances in the normal redox state of cells can cause toxic effects through the production of peroxides and free radicals that damage all components of the cell, including proteins, lipids, and DNA.

Oxidative stress from oxidative metabolism causes base damage, as well as strand breaks in DNA. Base damage is mostly indirect and caused by the reactive oxygen species generated, e.g., O^{−}_{2} (superoxide radical), OH (hydroxyl radical) and H_{2}O_{2} (hydrogen peroxide).

Short-term oxidative stress is required to initiate stress response processes in plants.

== Chemical and biological effects ==
Chemically, oxidative stress is associated with increased production of oxidizing species or a significant decrease in the effectiveness of antioxidant defenses, such as glutathione. The effects of oxidative stress depend upon the size of these changes, with a cell being able to overcome small perturbations and regain its original state. However, more severe oxidative stress can cause cell death, and even moderate oxidation can trigger apoptosis, while more intense stresses may cause necrosis.

Production of reactive oxygen species is a particularly destructive aspect of oxidative stress. Such species include free radicals and peroxides. Some of the less reactive of these species (such as superoxide) can be converted by oxidoreduction reactions with transition metals or other redox cycling compounds (including quinones) into more aggressive radical species that can cause extensive cellular damage. Most long-term effects are caused by damage to DNA.

DNA damage induced by ionizing radiation is similar to oxidative stress, and these lesions have been implicated in aging and cancer. Biological effects of single-base damage by radiation or oxidation, such as 8-oxoguanine and thymine glycol, have been extensively studied. Recently the focus has shifted to some of the more complex lesions. Tandem DNA lesions are formed at substantial frequency by ionizing radiation and metal-catalyzed H_{2}O_{2} reactions. Under anoxic conditions, the predominant double-base lesion is a species in which C8 of guanine is linked to the 5-methyl group of an adjacent 3'-thymine (G[8,5- Me]T).

Most of these oxygen-derived species are produced by normal aerobic metabolism. Normal cellular defense mechanisms destroy most of these. Repair of oxidative damages to DNA is frequent and ongoing, largely keeping up with newly induced damages. In rat urine, about 74,000 oxidative DNA adducts per cell are excreted daily. There is also a steady state level of oxidative damages in the DNA of a cell. There are about 24,000 oxidative DNA adducts per cell in young rats and 66,000 adducts per cell in old rats. Likewise, any damage to cells is constantly repaired. However, under the severe levels of oxidative stress that cause necrosis, the damage causes ATP depletion, preventing controlled apoptotic death and causing the cell to simply fall apart.

Polyunsaturated fatty acids, particularly arachidonic acid and linoleic acid, are primary targets for free radical and singlet oxygen oxidations. For example, in tissues and cells, the free radical oxidation of linoleic acid produces racemic mixtures of 13-hydroxy-9Z,11E-octadecadienoic acid, 13-hydroxy-9E,11E-octadecadienoic acid, 9-hydroxy-10E,12-E-octadecadienoic acid (9-EE-HODE), and 11-hydroxy-9Z,12-Z-octadecadienoic acid as well as 4-Hydroxynonenal while singlet oxygen attacks linoleic acid to produce (presumed but not yet proven to be racemic mixtures of) 13-hydroxy-9Z,11E-octadecadienoic acid, 9-hydroxy-10E,12-Z-octadecadienoic acid, 10-hydroxy-8E,12Z-octadecadienoic acid, and 12-hydroxy-9Z-13-E-octadecadienoic (see 13-Hydroxyoctadecadienoic acid and 9-Hydroxyoctadecadienoic acid).

Similar attacks on arachidonic acid produce a far larger set of products including various isoprostanes, hydroperoxy- and hydroxy- eicosatetraenoates, and 4-hydroxyalkenals. While many of these products are used as markers of oxidative stress, the products derived from linoleic acid appear far more predominant than arachidonic acid products and therefore easier to identify and quantify in, for example, atheromatous plaques.

Certain linoleic acid products have also been proposed to be markers for specific types of oxidative stress. For example, the presence of racemic 9-HODE and 9-EE-HODE mixtures reflects free radical oxidation of linoleic acid whereas the presence of racemic 10-hydroxy-8E,12Z-octadecadienoic acid and 12-hydroxy-9Z-13-E-octadecadienoic acid reflects singlet oxygen attack on linoleic acid.

In addition to serving as markers, the linoleic and arachidonic acid products can contribute to tissue and/or DNA damage but also act as signals to stimulate pathways which function to combat oxidative stress.

Oxidant	Description
•O^{−}_{2}, superoxide anion	One-electron reduction state of O_{2}, formed in many autoxidation reactions and by the electron transport chain. Rather unreactive but can release Fe^{2+} from iron-sulfur proteins and ferritin. Undergoes dismutation to form H_{2}O_{2} spontaneously or by enzymatic catalysis and is a precursor for metal-catalyzed •OH formation.
H_{2}O_{2}, hydrogen peroxide	Two-electron reduction state, formed by dismutation of •O^{−}_{2} or by direct reduction of O_{2}. Lipid-soluble and thus able to diffuse across membranes.
•OH, hydroxyl radical	Three-electron reduction state, formed by Fenton reaction and decomposition of peroxynitrite. Extremely reactive, will attack most cellular components
ROOH, organic hydroperoxide	Formed by radical reactions with cellular components such as lipids and nucleobases.
RO•, alkoxy and ROO•, peroxy radicals	Oxygen centred organic radicals. Lipid forms participate in lipid peroxidation reactions. Produced in the presence of oxygen by radical addition to double bonds or hydrogen abstraction.
HOCl, hypochlorous acid	Formed from H_{2}O_{2} by myeloperoxidase. Lipid-soluble and highly reactive. Will readily oxidize protein constituents, including thiol groups, amino groups and methionine.
ONOO-, peroxynitrite	Formed in a rapid reaction between •O^{−}_{2} and NO•. Lipid-soluble and similar in reactivity to hypochlorous acid. Protonation forms peroxynitrous acid, which can undergo homolytic cleavage to form hydroxyl radical and nitrogen dioxide.

Table adapted from.

== Production and consumption of oxidants ==
One source of reactive oxygen under normal conditions in humans is the leakage of activated oxygen from mitochondria during oxidative phosphorylation. E. coli mutants that lack an active electron transport chain produce as much hydrogen peroxide as wild-type cells, indicating that other enzymes contribute the bulk of oxidants in these organisms. One possibility is that multiple redox-active flavoproteins all contribute a small portion to the overall production of oxidants under normal conditions.

Other enzymes capable of producing superoxide are xanthine oxidase, NADPH oxidases and cytochromes P450. Hydrogen peroxide is produced by a wide variety of enzymes including several oxidases. Reactive oxygen species play important roles in cell signalling, a process termed redox signaling. Thus, to maintain proper cellular homeostasis, a balance must be struck between reactive oxygen production and consumption.

The best studied cellular antioxidants are the enzymes superoxide dismutase (SOD), catalase, and glutathione peroxidase. Less well studied (but probably just as important) enzymatic antioxidants are the peroxiredoxins and the recently discovered sulfiredoxin. Other enzymes that have antioxidant properties (though this is not their primary role) include paraoxonase, glutathione-S transferases, and aldehyde dehydrogenases.

The amino acid methionine is prone to oxidation, but oxidation of methionine can be reversible. Oxidation of methionine is shown to inhibit the phosphorylation of adjacent Ser/Thr/Tyr sites in proteins. This gives a plausible mechanism for cells to couple oxidative stress signals with mainstream cellular signaling such as phosphorylation.

== Antioxidants as supplements ==
The use of antioxidants to prevent some diseases is controversial. In a high-risk group like smokers, high doses of beta carotene increased the rate of lung cancer since high doses of beta-carotene in conjunction with high oxygen tension due to smoking results in a pro-oxidant effect and an antioxidant effect when oxygen tension is not high. In less high-risk groups, the use of vitamin E appears to reduce the risk of heart disease. However, while consumption of food rich in vitamin E may reduce the risk of coronary heart disease in middle-aged to older men and women, using vitamin E supplements also appears to result in an increase in total mortality, heart failure, and hemorrhagic stroke. The American Heart Association therefore recommends the consumption of food rich in antioxidant vitamins and other nutrients, but does not recommend the use of vitamin E supplements to prevent cardiovascular disease. In other diseases, such as Alzheimer's, the evidence on vitamin E supplementation is also mixed. Since dietary sources contain a wider range of carotenoids and vitamin E tocopherols and tocotrienols from whole foods, ex post facto epidemiological studies can have differing conclusions than artificial experiments using isolated compounds. The nitrone radical scavenger NXY-059 was investigated for acute ischemic stroke, but a large phase III trial failed to confirm its efficacy.

The USDA removed the table showing the Oxygen Radical Absorbance Capacity (ORAC) of Selected Foods Release 2 (2010) table due to the lack of evidence that the antioxidant level present in a food translated into a related antioxidant effect in the body.

== Metal catalysts ==
Metals such as iron, copper, chromium, vanadium, and cobalt are capable of redox cycling in which a single electron may be accepted or donated by the metal. This action catalyzes production of reactive radicals and reactive oxygen species. The presence of such metals in biological systems in an uncomplexed form (not in a protein or other protective metal complex) can significantly increase the level of oxidative stress. These metals are thought to induce Fenton reactions and the Haber-Weiss reaction, in which hydroxyl radical is generated from hydrogen peroxide. The hydroxyl radical then can modify amino acids. For example, meta-tyrosine and ortho-tyrosine form by hydroxylation of phenylalanine. Other reactions include lipid peroxidation and oxidation of nucleobases. Metal-catalyzed oxidations also lead to irreversible modification of arginine, lysine, proline, and threonine. Excessive oxidative-damage leads to protein degradation or aggregation.

The reaction of transition metals with proteins oxidized by reactive oxygen or nitrogen species can yield reactive products that accumulate and contribute to aging and disease. For example, in Alzheimer's patients, peroxidized lipids and proteins accumulate in lysosomes of the brain cells.

== Origin of eukaryotes ==
The great oxygenation event began with the biologically induced appearance of oxygen in the Earth's atmosphere about 2.45 billion years ago. The rise of oxygen levels due to cyanobacterial photosynthesis in ancient microenvironments was probably highly toxic to the surrounding biota. Under these conditions, the selective pressure of oxidative stress is thought to have driven the evolutionary transformation of an archaeal lineage into the first eukaryotes. Oxidative stress might have acted in synergy with other environmental stresses (such as ultraviolet radiation and/or desiccation) to drive this selection. Selective pressure for efficient repair of oxidative DNA damages may have promoted the evolution of eukaryotic sex involving such features as cell-cell fusions, cytoskeleton-mediated chromosome movements and emergence of the nuclear membrane. Thus, the evolution of meiotic sex and eukaryogenesis may have been inseparable processes that evolved in large part to facilitate repair of oxidative DNA damages.

== See also ==
- Antioxidative stress
- Acatalasia
- Bruce Ames
- Catalase
- Catalysis
- Hydrogen peroxide
- Malondialdehyde, an oxidative stress marker
- Mitochondrial free radical theory of aging
- Mitohormesis
- Nitric oxide
- Pro-oxidant
- Reductive stress
