= GPR65 =

Protein-coding gene in the species Homo sapiens

Identifiers
- Aliases: GPR65, TDAG8, hTDAG8, G protein-coupled receptor 65
- External IDs: OMIM: 604620; MGI: 108031; GeneCards: GPR65

Gene location (Human)
Chr.	Chromosome 14 (human)
Band	14q31.3	Start	88,005,135 bp
Band	14q31.3	End	88,014,811 bp

Gene location (Mouse)
Chr.	Chromosome 12 (mouse)
Band	12|12 E	Start	98,234,894 bp
Band	12|12 E	End	98,242,903 bp
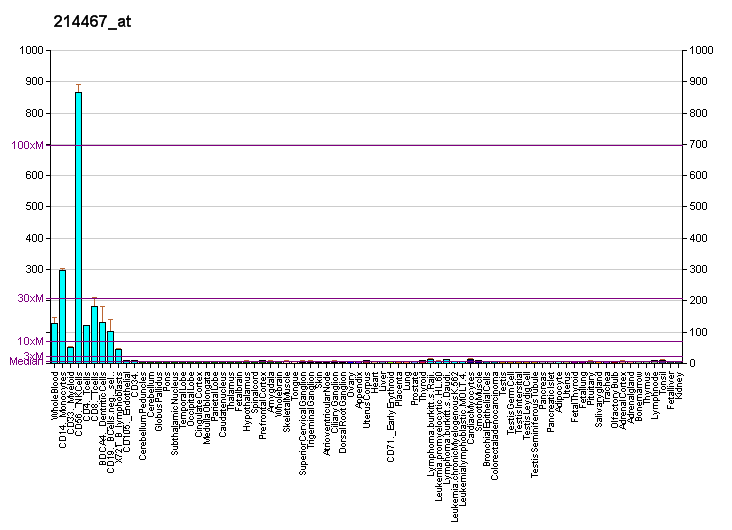
RNA expression pattern
Bgee	Human / Mouse (ortholog); Top expressed in: white blood cell; mononuclear cell; monocyte; periodontal fiber; granulocyte; blood; bone marrow; appendix; trabecular bone; spleen / Top expressed in: granulocyte; stroma of bone marrow; spleen; lymph node; thymus; mesenteric lymph nodes; blood; dermis; pharynx; subcutaneous adipose tissue; More reference expression data
BioGPS	More reference expression data
Gene ontology
Molecular function	G protein-coupled receptor activity; signal transducer activity
Cellular component	integral component of membrane; plasma membrane; integral component of plasma membrane; membrane; intracellular anatomical structure
Biological process	multicellular organism development; actin cytoskeleton reorganization; immune response; positive regulation of stress fiber assembly; activation of GTPase activity; response to acidic pH; signal transduction; apoptotic process; positive regulation of Rho protein signal transduction; positive regulation of cytosolic calcium ion concentration involved in phospholipase C-activating G protein-coupled signaling pathway; G protein-coupled receptor signaling pathway; adenylate cyclase-activating G protein-coupled receptor signaling pathway
Sources:Amigo / QuickGO
Orthologs
Databases	NCBI: entry; OMA: entry
Species	Human	Mouse
Entrez	8477	14744
Ensembl	ENSG00000140030	ENSMUSG00000021886
UniProt	Q8IYL9	Q61038
RefSeq (mRNA)	NM_003608	NM_008152
RefSeq (protein)	NP_003599	NP_032178
Location (UCSC)	Chr 14: 88.01 – 88.01 Mb	Chr 12: 98.23 – 98.24 Mb
PubMed search
- Wikidata
View/Edit Human	View/Edit Mouse

Psychosine receptor is a G protein-coupled receptor (GPCR) protein that in humans is encoded by the GPR65 gene. GPR65 is also referred to as TDAG8.

== Species, tissue, and subcellular distribution ==
GPR65 (TDAG8) is primarily expressed in lymphoid tissues (spleen, lymph nodes, thymus, and leukocytes), and as a GPCR, the protein is localized to the plasma membrane.

== Function ==
=== Ligand binding ===
In 2001, GPR65 was reported to be a specific receptor for psychosine (d-galactosyl-β-1,1′ sphingosine) as well as several other related glycosphingolipids. However, the specific binding of psychosine to GPR65 has been contested as the reported ligand binding did not satisfy the appropriate pharmacological criteria.

More recently, 3-[(2,4-dichlorophenyl)methylsulfanyl]-1,6-dimethylpyridazino[4,5-e][1,3,4]thiadiazin-5-one (referred to as BTB09089) was found to be a specific agonist for GPR65. Furthermore, [(S)-phenyl(pyridin-4-yl)methyl] 4-methyl-2-pyrimidin-2-yl-1,3-thiazole-5-carboxylate (referred to as ZINC62678696) was found to act as a BTB09089 negative allosteric modulator.

=== pH sensing ===
GPR65 senses extracellular pH. Levels of cyclic adenosine monophosphate (cAMP), a secondary messenger associated with activation of GPCRs in the cAMP-dependent pathway, were found to be elevated in neutral to acidic extracellular pH (pH 7.0-6.5) in cells expressing GPR65. In cells with mutated GPR65, this pH-sensing effect was reduced or eliminated. In the presence of psychosine, however, the levels of cAMP increased at a shifted, more acidic pH range. As such, psychosine displayed an inhibitory effect as an antagonist when GPR65 was stimulated with an increasing concentration of protons (increasingly acidic pH). This finding directly contested the previous reporting of psychosine as an activating ligand for GPR65.

The pH-sensing ability of GPR65 was further tested and confirmed, as it was found that cAMP levels increased when GPR65 was stimulated by pH values less than pH 7.2.

GPR65 senses pH by protonation of histidine residues on its extracellular domain, and when activated, GPR65 enables the downstream signaling through the Gq/11, Gs, and G12/13 pathways. The ability of GPR65 to sense pH can modulate several cellular functions in various biological systems including the immune, cardiovascular, respiratory, renal, and nervous systems.

GPR65's ability to sense pH plays a prominent role in tumor development. GPR65 is highly expressed in a variety of human tumors. Tumor development is associated with low extracellular pH due to changes in metabolism of rapidly dividing cells. GPR65 enables tumor growth by sensing the acidic environment. It was found that overexpression of GPR65 prevents tumor cell death in acidic conditions in vitro and facilitates tumor growth in vivo.

=== Immune ===
GPR65 reduces immune-mediated inflammation by regulating cytokine production of T cells (including IL-6, TNF-α and IL-1β) and macrophages.

=== Cardiovascular ===
After myocardial infarction, anaerobic respiration and severe inflammation occurs—both of which are accompanied by an acidic environment. GPR65 knockout mice showed a decline in survival and cardiac function after myocardial infarction, which indicates that GPR65-mediated pH sensing is physiologically relevant. GPR65 exhibits a cardioprotective effect against myocardial infarction by reducing CCL20 expression and the migration of IL-17A-producing γδT cells that express CCR6, a receptor for CCL20.

=== Visual ===
Retinal function is sensitive to changes in pH. It was found that GPR65 is overexpressed in the retina of mouse models of retinal degeneration and that the receptor supports the survival of photoreceptors in a degenerating retina by sensing pH and activating microglia after light-injury.

=== Gastrointestinal ===
Vagal afferents expressing GPR65 innervate intestinal villi. These GPR65-expressing vagal afferents detect nutrients in the intestinal lumen and also slow gut motility.

=== Depression ===
GPR65 was identified as a potential target linking inflammation and depression. GPR65 knockout mice exhibited a significant reduction in mobility in a forced swim test as well as higher consumption of sucrose—both of which are behaviors associated with depression.

== History/Discovery ==
In 1996, Choi et al. first identified GPR65 (TDAG8) as a G protein-coupled receptor whose expression was induced during activation-induced apoptosis of T cells. The group sought to identify which genes were necessary during T cell receptor-mediated death of immature thymocytes, and using differential mRNA display, they found that TDAG8 expression was induced upon activation of T cells. Because this gene was found to be associated with T-cell death (apoptosis), it was named TDAG8, or T Cell Death Associated Gene 8.

== See also ==
- Proton-sensing G protein-coupled receptors
