= Proton-sensing G protein-coupled receptors =

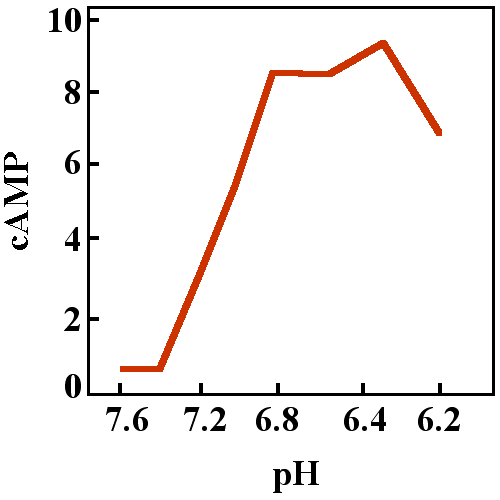
Production of cAMP in response to activation of TDAG8 G protein-coupled receptor by low pH. Data from Wang et al., "TDAG8 is a proton-sensing and psychosine-sensitive G-protein-coupled receptor".

Proton-sensing G protein-coupled receptors are transmembrane receptors which sense acidic pH and include GPR132 (G2A), GPR4, GPR68 (OGR1) and GPR65 (TDAG8). These G protein-coupled receptors are activated when extracellular pH falls into the range of 6.4-6.8 (typical values are above 7.0). The functional role of the low pH sensitivity of the proton-sensing G protein-coupled receptors is being studied in several tissues where cells respond to conditions of low pH including bone and inflamed tissues. The four known proton-sensing G protein-coupled receptors are Class A receptors in subfamily A15.

== Nociception ==
Pain sensation can be initiated by nociceptor cells that are sensory neurons with cell bodies located in the dorsal root ganglia. Some nociceptors respond to low pH and the pH-sensitive amiloride-sensitive cation channel 3 has been described as a modulator of acid-induced pain sensation. However, results with amiloride-sensitive cation channel 3 gene knockout mice suggest that those channels do not fully account for acid-induced pain sensation. Proton-sensing G protein-coupled receptors have been shown to be expressed in small-diameter neurons responsible for nociception where they may play a role in acid-induced pain sensation. Acid-sensing neuron-mediated immediate pungent pain has been associated with acid-sensing ion channels.

== Other functions ==
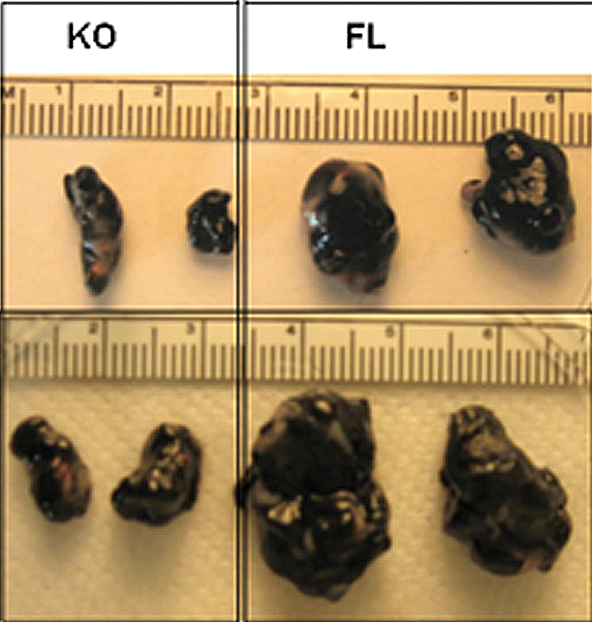
Mice lacking the Ovarian cancer G protein-coupled receptor 1 gene (OGR1) had slower melanoma growth (KO) than control mice with OGR1 (FL), possibly due to a difference in macrophage activity.

Mice lacking each of the four identified proton-sensing GPCRs have been studied. Results so far suggest that these GPCRs might regulate cell proliferation (immune system cells such as lymphocytes and macrophages), but due to redundancy and expression of multiple proton-sensing GPCRs family members in the same cell, multiple gene knockouts are needed. Results for mice lacking OGR1 suggested a possible role for proton-sensing GPCRs in osteoclasts.
