= Sphingosine beta-galactosyltransferase =

Class of enzymes

Identifiers
- EC no.: 2.4.1.23
- CAS no.: 9032-90-0

Databases
- IntEnz: IntEnz view
- BRENDA: BRENDA entry
- ExPASy: NiceZyme view
- KEGG: KEGG entry
- MetaCyc: metabolic pathway
- PRIAM: profile
- PDB structures: RCSB PDB PDBe PDBsum
- Gene Ontology: AmiGO / QuickGO
Search
- PMC: articles
- PubMed: articles
- NCBI: proteins

Sphingosine beta-galactosyltransferase (EC 2.4.1.23) is an enzyme that catalyzes the chemical reaction

UDP-galactose +
sphingosine
UDP
psychosine

The enzyme transfer a galactose sugar from uridine diphosphate galactose to sphingosine at its terminal hydroxy group. This produces psychosine, a cytotoxic compound, with uridine diphosphate (UDP) as a byproduct.

This enzyme belongs to the family of glycosyltransferases, specifically the hexosyltransferases. The systematic name of this enzyme class is UDP-galactose:sphingosine 1-beta-galactosyltransferase. Other names in common use include psychosine-UDP galactosyltransferase, galactosyl-sphingosine transferase, psychosine-uridine diphosphate galactosyltransferase, UDP-galactose:sphingosine O-galactosyl transferase, uridine diphosphogalactose-sphingosine beta-galactosyltransferase, and UDP-galactose:sphingosine 1-beta-galactotransferase. This enzyme participates in sphingolipid metabolism.
