= Densipolic acid =

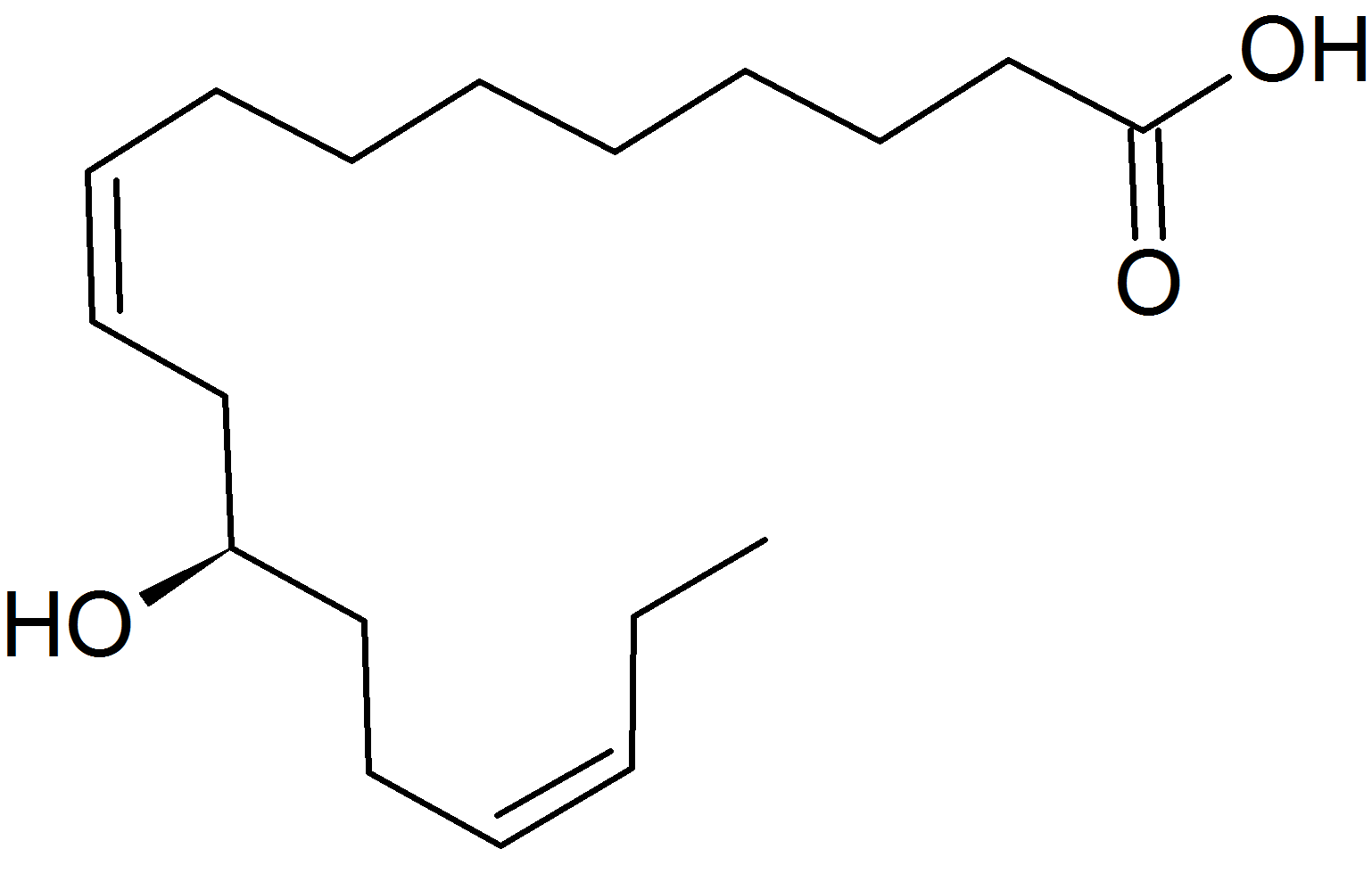

Names
- IUPAC name (9Z,12R,15Z)-12-hydroxyoctadeca-9,15-dienoic acid
- Other names 12R-HODE

Identifiers
CAS Number	7121-47-3
3D model (JSmol)	Interactive image
ChEBI	CHEBI:165769
ChemSpider	4472256
PubChem CID	5312831
- InChI: InChI=1S/C18H32O3/c1-2-3-4-11-14-17(19)15-12-9-7-5-6-8-10-13-16-18(20)21/h3-4,9,12,17,19H,2,5-8,10-11,13-16H2,1H3,(H,20,21)/b4-3-,12-9-/t17-/m1/s1 Key: OKIDIWHWTIMACU-MNEPGTOVSA-N
- SMILES: CCC=CCCC(CC=CCCCCCCCC(=O)O)O

Properties
Chemical formula	C_{18}H_{32}O_{3}
Molar mass	296.451 g·mol^{−1}
- Except where otherwise noted, data are given for materials in their standard state (at 25 °C [77 °F], 100 kPa). Infobox references

Densipolic acid is a linear fatty acid composed of 18 carbon atoms, with two double bonds in the positions 9=10 and 15=16 and a hydroxyl-OH in the position 12. Although the compound has no nutritional relevance, densipolic acid is an Omega-3 acid.

== Discovery ==
The acid was initially isolated C. R. Smith and colleagues in 1962 from the seed oil of the Lesquerella densipila plant, from which it takes its name.

The acid is typically found together with other hydroxylated fatty acids (lesquerolic, auricolic, ricinoleic, etc.) in the seed oil of other Lesquerella species (lescurii, perforata, stonensis, lyrata, etc.) and some Physaria species of the Brassicaceae family.

== Chemical properties ==
The biosynthetic pathways of hydroxylated fatty acids in plants have not been fully researched. There is biochemical evidence that an n−3 desaturase, in acids with 18 carbon atoms a Δ15 desaturase, is able to convert ricinoleic acid to densipolic acid.

In seed oils with high concentrations of hydroxylated fatty acids there is the possibility of forming atypical glycerides, such as triglycerides containing more than three acyl groups.

== See also ==
- Bladderpod oil
