= GPR4 =

Protein-coding gene in the species Homo sapiens

Identifiers
- Aliases: GPR4, G protein-coupled receptor 4, GPR6C.l
- External IDs: OMIM: 600551; MGI: 2441992; GeneCards: GPR4

Gene location (Human)
Chr.	Chromosome 19 (human)
Band	19q13.32	Start	45,589,764 bp
Band	19q13.32	End	45,602,212 bp

Gene location (Mouse)
Chr.	Chromosome 7 (mouse)
Band	7|7 A3	Start	18,946,463 bp
Band	7|7 A3	End	18,958,099 bp
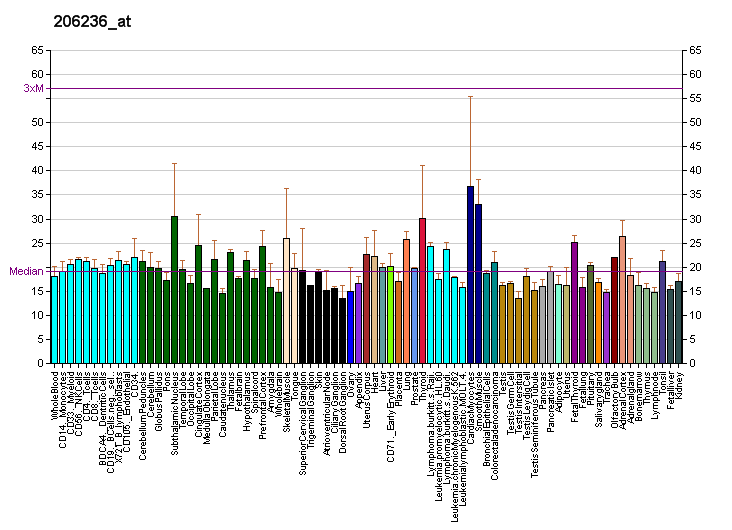

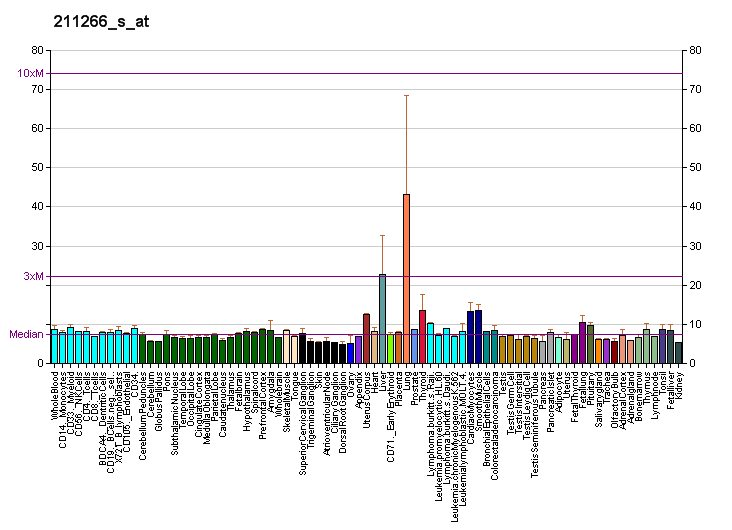
RNA expression pattern
Bgee	Human / Mouse (ortholog); Top expressed in: upper lobe of left lung; right lung; apex of heart; left lobe of thyroid gland; right lobe of thyroid gland; left ventricle; pericardium; subcutaneous adipose tissue; epithelium of colon; tibial nerve / Top expressed in: molar; otolith organ; utricle; habenula; myocardium of ventricle; medial dorsal nucleus; seminiferous tubule; muscle of thigh; medial head of gastrocnemius muscle; embryo; More reference expression data
BioGPS	More reference expression data
Gene ontology
Molecular function	signal transducer activity; G protein-coupled receptor activity
Cellular component	integral component of membrane; plasma membrane; integral component of plasma membrane; membrane
Biological process	negative regulation of angiogenesis; angiogenesis involved in wound healing; G protein-coupled receptor signaling pathway; glomerular mesangial cell development; signal transduction; response to acidic pH; positive regulation of Rho protein signal transduction; positive regulation of cytosolic calcium ion concentration involved in phospholipase C-activating G protein-coupled signaling pathway
Sources:Amigo / QuickGO
Orthologs
Databases	NCBI: entry; OMA: entry
Species	Human	Mouse
Entrez	2828	319197
Ensembl	ENSG00000177464	ENSMUSG00000044317
UniProt	P46093	Q8BUD0
RefSeq (mRNA)	NM_005282	NM_175668
RefSeq (protein)	NP_005273	NP_783599
Location (UCSC)	Chr 19: 45.59 – 45.6 Mb	Chr 7: 18.95 – 18.96 Mb
PubMed search
- Wikidata
View/Edit Human	View/Edit Mouse

G-protein coupled receptor 4 is a protein that in humans is encoded by the GPR4 gene.

== See also ==
- Proton-sensing G protein-coupled receptors
