= GPR68 =

Protein-coding gene in the species Homo sapiens

Identifiers
- Aliases: GPR68, GPR12A, OGR1, G protein-coupled receptor 68, AI2A6
- External IDs: OMIM: 601404; MGI: 2441763; GeneCards: GPR68

Gene location (Human)
Chr.	Chromosome 14 (human)
Band	14q32.11	Start	91,232,532 bp
Band	14q32.11	End	91,253,925 bp

Gene location (Mouse)
Chr.	Chromosome 12 (mouse)
Band	12|12 E	Start	100,842,941 bp
Band	12|12 E	End	100,874,457 bp
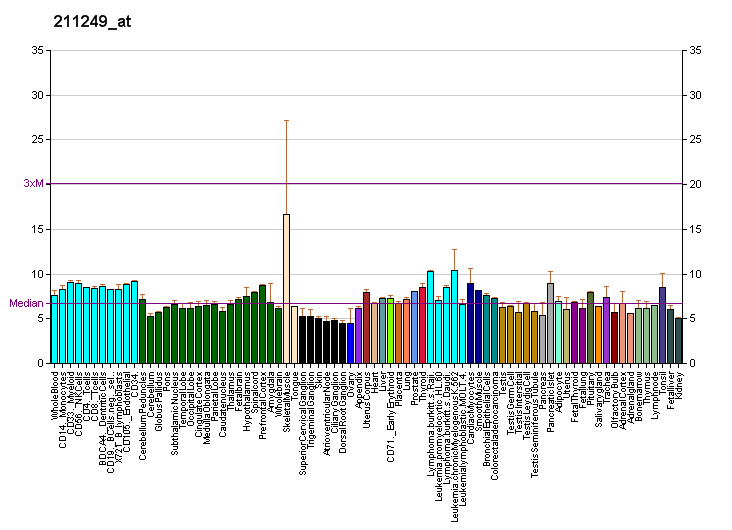
RNA expression pattern
Bgee	Human / Mouse (ortholog); Top expressed in: tendon of biceps brachii; granulocyte; gingival epithelium; testicle; cardia; pylorus; buccal mucosa cell; saphenous vein; pituitary gland; human penis / Top expressed in: zygote; oocyte; primary oocyte; secondary oocyte; mesenteric lymph nodes; lumbar subsegment of spinal cord; dentate gyrus of hippocampal formation granule cell; cerebellar cortex; hippocampus proper; ciliary body; More reference expression data
BioGPS	More reference expression data
Gene ontology
Molecular function	G protein-coupled receptor activity; signal transducer activity
Cellular component	integral component of membrane; plasma membrane; integral component of plasma membrane; membrane
Biological process	G protein-coupled receptor signaling pathway; negative regulation of monocyte differentiation; positive regulation of insulin secretion involved in cellular response to glucose stimulus; cellular response to pH; inflammatory response; positive regulation of osteoclast development; signal transduction; positive regulation of insulin secretion
Sources:Amigo / QuickGO
Orthologs
Databases	NCBI: entry; OMA: entry
Species	Human	Mouse
Entrez	8111	238377
Ensembl	ENSG00000119714	ENSMUSG00000047415
UniProt	Q15743	Q8BFQ3
RefSeq (mRNA)	NM_001177676; NM_003485; NM_001348437	NM_001177673; NM_001177674; NM_175493
RefSeq (protein)	NP_001171147; NP_003476; NP_001335366	NP_001171144; NP_001171145; NP_780702; NP_001390243
Location (UCSC)	Chr 14: 91.23 – 91.25 Mb	Chr 12: 100.84 – 100.87 Mb
PubMed search
- Wikidata
View/Edit Human	View/Edit Mouse

Ovarian cancer G-protein coupled receptor 1 is a protein that in humans is encoded by the GPR68 gene.

== See also ==
- Proton-sensing G protein-coupled receptors
