= Psychosine =

Names
- IUPAC name (2S,3R,4E)-2-Amino-3-hydroxyoctadec-4-en-1-yl β-D-galactopyranoside
- Systematic IUPAC name (2R,3R,4S,5R,6R)-2-{[(2S,3R,4E)-2-Amino-3-hydroxyoctadec-4-en-1-yl]oxy}-6-(hydroxymethyl)oxane-3,4,5-triol

Identifiers
| CAS Number | 2238-90-6 |
| 3D model (JSmol) | Interactive image |
| Beilstein Reference | 52571 |
| ChEBI | CHEBI:16874 |
| ChemSpider | 4444111 |
| ECHA InfoCard | 100.164.357 |
| EC Number | 636-571-3 |
| KEGG | C01747 |
| PubChem CID | 5280458 |
| UNII | BG5A25U68L |
| CompTox Dashboard (EPA) | DTXSID60896981 |
- InChI: InChI=1S/C24H47NO7/c1-2-3-4-5-6-7-8-9-10-11-12-13-14-15-19(27)18(25)17-31-24-23(30)22(29)21(28)20(16-26)32-24/h14-15,18-24,26-30H,2-13,16-17,25H2,1H3/b15-14+/t18-,19+,20+,21-,22-,23+,24+/m0/s1 Key: HHJTWTPUPVQKNA-PIIMIWFASA-N
- SMILES: CCCCCCCCCCCCC/C=C/[C@H]([C@H](CO[C@H]1[C@@H]([C@H]([C@H]([C@H](O1)CO)O)O)O)N)O

Properties
| Chemical formula | C_{24}H_{47}NO_{7} |
| Molar mass | 461.640 g·mol^{−1} |

Hazards
- GHS labelling
| Pictograms | (GHS07: Exclamation mark) |
| Signal word | Warning |
| Hazard statements | H302, H312, H332 |
| Precautionary statements | P261, P264, P270, P271, P280, P301+P312, P302+P352, P304+P312, P304+P340, P312, P322, P330, P363, P501 |
- Except where otherwise noted, data are given for materials in their standard state (at 25 °C [77 °F], 100 kPa). Infobox references

Psychosine is a highly cytotoxic lipid that accumulates in the nervous system in the absence of galactosylceramidase and has been associated with Krabbe disease.

== Formation ==
The enzyme sphingosine beta-galactosyltransferase converts sphingosine to psychosine:

UDP-galactose +
sphingosine
UDP
psychosine

In this reaction, a galactose sugar from uridine diphosphate galactose is added to sphingosine at its terminal hydroxy group. Uridine diphosphate (UDP) is the byproduct.
