= 9-Hydroxyoctadecadienoic acid =

Names
- Preferred IUPAC name (9S,10E,12Z)-9-Hydroxyoctadeca-10,12-dienoic acid
- Other names: α-Dimorphecolic acid; 9-hydroxy-10(E),12(Z)-octadecadienoic acid

Identifiers
CAS Number	73543-67-6
3D model (JSmol)	Interactive image
ChemSpider	4472255
ECHA InfoCard	100.230.886
PubChem CID	5312830
UNII	42KE04U9BM
CompTox Dashboard (EPA)	DTXSID20868260
- InChI: InChI=1S/C18H32O3/c1-2-3-4-5-6-8-11-14-17(19)15-12-9-7-10-13-16-18(20)21/h6,8,11,14,17,19H,2-5,7,9-10,12-13,15-16H2,1H3,(H,20,21)/b8-6-,14-11+/t17-/m1/s1 COPY Key: NPDSHTNEKLQQIJ-UINYOVNOSA-N
- SMILES: CCCCC/C=C\C=C\[C@H](CCCCCCCC(=O)O)O

Properties
Chemical formula	C_{18}H_{32}O_{3}
Molar mass	296.451 g·mol^{−1}
- Except where otherwise noted, data are given for materials in their standard state (at 25 °C [77 °F], 100 kPa). Infobox references

9-Hydroxyoctadecadienoic acid (or 9-HODE) has been used in the literature to designate either or both of two stereoisomer metabolites of the essential fatty acid, linoleic acid: 9(S)-hydroxy-10(E),12(Z)-octadecadienoic acid (9(S)-HODE) and 9(R)-hydroxy-10(E),12(Z)-octadecadienoic acid (9(R)-HODE); these two metabolites differ in having their hydroxy residues in the S or R configurations, respectively. The accompanying figure gives the structure for 9(S)-HETE. Two other 9-hydroxy linoleic acid derivatives occur in nature, the 10E,12E isomers of 9(S)-HODE and 9(R)-HODE viz., 9(S)-hydroxy-10E,12E-octadecadienoic acid (9(S)-EE-HODE) and 9(R)-hydroxy-10E,12E-octadecadienoic acid (13(R)-EE-HODE); these two derivatives have their double bond at carbon 12 in the E or trans configuration as opposed to the Z or cis configuration. The four 9-HODE isomers, particularly under conditions of oxidative stress, may form together in cells and tissues; they have overlapping but not identical biological activities and significances. Because many studies have not distinguished between the S and R stereoisomers and, particularly in identifying tissue levels, the two EE isomers, 9-HODE is used here when the isomer studied is unclear.

A similar set of 13-Hydroxyoctadecadienoic acid (13-HODE) metabolites (13(S)-HODE), 13(R)-HODE, 13(S)-EE-HODE), and 13(R)-EE-HODE) also occurs naturally and, again particularly under conditions of oxidative stress, may form concurrently with 9-HODEs; these 13-HODEs also have overlapping and complementary but not identical activities with the 9-HODEs. Some recent studies measuring HODE levels in tissue have lumped the four 9-HODEs and four 13-HODEs together to report only on total HODEs (tHODEs): tHODEs have been proposed to be markers for certain human disease. Other recent studies have lumped together the 9-(S), 9(R), 13 (S)-, and 13(R)-HODE along with the two ketone metabolites of these HODEs, 9-oxoODE (9-oxo-10(E),12(Z)-octadecadienoic acid) and 13-oxoODE, reporting only on total OXLAMs (oxidized linoleic acid metabolites); the OXLAMs have been implicated in working together to signal for pain perception.

== Pathways making 9-HODEs ==
=== Cyclooxygenases 1 and 2 ===
The enzymes cyclooxygenase 1 (COX-1) and cyclooxygenase 2 (COX-2), which are best known for metabolizing arachidonic acid to prostaglandins, are also able to metabolize linoleic acid predominantly to 9(R)-hydroperoxy-10(E),12(Z)-octadecadienoic acid (i.e. 9(R)-HpODE)-HODE) and lesser amounts of 9(S)-hydroperoxy-10(E),12(Z)-octadecadienoic acid (i.e. 9(S)-HpODE); in cells and tissues, the two hydroperoxy metabolites are rapidly reduce to 9(R)-HODE and 9(S)-HODE, respectively. COX-2 exhibits a greater preference for linoleic acid than does Cox-1 and is therefore credited with producing most of these products in cells expressing both COX enzymes. The COXs also metabolize linoleic acid to 13(S)-hydroperoxy-octadecadionoic acid (13(S)-HpODE and lesser amounts of 13(R)-hydroperoxy-octadecadienoic acid (13(R)-HpODE, which are then rapidly reduced to 13(S)-HODE) and 13(R)-HODE; the two enzymes therefore metabolize linoleic acid predominantly to the R stereoisomer of 9-HODE and (S) stereoisomer of 13-HODE with the 13-HODE products predominating over the 9-HODE products.

=== Cytochrome P450 ===
Cytochrome P450 microsomal enzymes metabolize linoleic acid to a mixture of 9(S)-HpODE and 9(R)-HpODE which are subsequently reduced to their corresponding hydroxy products; these reactions produce racemic mixtures in which the R stereoisomer predominates, for instance by a R/S ratio of 80%/20% in human liver microsomes. In cells and tissues, the cytochrome enzymes concurrently metabolize linoleic acid to 13(S)-HpODE and 13(R)-HpODE which are reduced to 13(S)-HODE and 13(R)-HODE in an R/S ratio similar to than of the 9-HODES, i.e. 80%/20%.

=== Free-radical and singlet-oxygen oxidations ===
Oxidative stress in cells and tissues produces Free-radical-induced and singlet-oxygen-induced oxidations of linoleic acid to generate the various racemic mixtures of 9-HpODE and 9-HODE in non-enzymatic reactions that produce, or are suspected but not proven to produce, approximately equal amounts of their S and R stereoisomers. These oxidations are credited with being the major contributors to 9-HODE and 13-HODE isomer production in tissues undergoing oxidative stress such as occurs in any tissue suffering inadequate blood flow, inflammation, or other serious insult, in liver steatohepatitis, in the atheroma plaques of cardiovascular disease, in nerve tissues of neurodegenerative diseases, and in the various tissues compromised by diabetes (see oxidative stress). Free-radical oxidation of linoleic acid produces racemic mixtures of 9-HODE and 9-EE-HODE; singlet-oxygen attack on linoleic acid produces (presumably) racemic mixtures of 9-HODE, 10-hydroxy-8E,12Z-octadecadienoic acid, and 12-hydroxy-9Z-13-E-octadecadienoic acid. Since free-radical-induced and singlet-oxygen-induced oxidations of linoleic acid produce a similar set of 13-HODE metabolites (see 13-Hydroxyoctadecadienoic acid), since both free radicals and singlet oxygen attack not only free linoleic acid but also linoleic acid bound to phospholipids, glycerides, cholesterol, and other lipids, and since free-radical and singlet-oxygen reactions may occur together, oxygen-stressed tissues often contain an array of free and lipid-bound 9-HODE and 13-HODE products. For example, laboratory studies find that 9-HODE and 9-EE-HODE (along with their 13-HODE counterparts) are found in the phospholipid and cholesterol components of low-density lipoproteins that have been oxidized by human monocytes; the reaction appears due to the in situ free-radical- and/or superoxide-induced oxidation of the lipoproteins.

=== Mouse 8(S)-lipoxygenase ===
The murine homolog of human 15(S)-lipoxygenase-2 (ALOX15B), 8(S)-lipoxygenase, while preferring arachidonic acid over linoleic acid, metabolizes linoleic acid predominantly to (9(S)-HpODE, which in tissues and cells is rapidly reduced to 9(S)-HODE. However, ALOX15B, similar to human 15-lipoxygenase-1 (ALOX15), metabolizes linoleic acid to 13(S)-HODE but not to 9(S)-HODEs.

== Metabolism ==
Like most unsaturated fatty acids, the 9-HODEs formed in cells are incorporated into cellular phospholipids principally at the sn-2 position of the phospholipid (see Phospholipase A2); since, however, the linoleic acid bound to cellular phospholipids is susceptible to non-enzymatic peroxidation and free-radical attack, the 9-HODEs in cellular phospholipids may also derive more directly from in-situ oxidation. 9-HODE esterified to the sn-2 position of phosphatidylserine is subject to be released as free 9-HODE by the action of cytosol (see phospholipase A2 section on cPLA2) and therefore may serve as a storage pool that is mobilized by cell stimulation.

9-HODE may be further metabolized to 9-oxo-10(E),12(Z)-octadecadienoic acid (9-oxoODE or 9-oxo-ODE), possibly by the same hydroxy-fatty-acid dehydrogenase which metabolizes other hydroxy fatty acids, such as 13-HODE, to their oxo derivatives.

== Direct actions ==
9-HODE, 9-oxoODE, and 9-EE-HODE (along with their 13-HODE counterparts) directly activate peroxisome proliferator-activated receptor gamma (PPARγ). This activation appears responsible for the ability of 13-HODE (and 9-HODE) to induce the transcription of PPARγ-inducible genes in human monocytes as well as to stimulate the maturation of these cells to macrophages. 13(S)-HODE (and 9(S)-HODE) also stimulate the activation of peroxisome proliferator-activated receptor beta (PPARβ) in a model cell system; 13-HODE (and 9-HODE) are also proposed to contribute to the ability of oxidized low-density lipoprotein (LDL) to activate PPARβl: LDL containing phospholipid-bound 13-HODE (and 9-HODE) is taken up by the cell and then acted on by phospholipases to release the HODEs which in turn directly activate PPARβl.

13(S)-HODE, 13(R)-HODE and 13-oxoODE, along with their 9-HODE counterparts, also act on cells through TRPV1. TRPV1 is the transient receptor potential cation channel subfamily V member 1 receptor (also termed capsaicin receptor or vanilloid receptor 1). These 6 HODEs, dubbed, oxidized linoleic acid metabolites (OXLAMs), individually but also and possibly to a greater extent when acting together, stimulate TRPV1-dependent responses in rodent neurons, rodent and human bronchial epithelial cells, and in model cells made to express rodent or human TRPV1. This stimulation appears due to a direct interaction of these agents on TRPV1 although reports disagree on the potencies of the (OXLAMs) with, for example, the most potent OXLAM, 9(S)-HODE, requiring at least 10 micromoles/liter or a more physiological concentration of 10 nanomoles/liter to activate TRPV1 in rodent neurons. The OXLAM-TRPV1 interaction is credited with mediating pain sensation in rodents (see below).

9(S)-HODE and with progressively lesser potencies 9(S)-HpODE, a racemic mixture of 9-HODE, 13(S)-HpODE, and 13(S)-HODE directly activate human (but not mouse) GPR132 (i.e. G protein coupled receptor 132 or G2A) in Chinese hamster ovary cells made to express these receptors; 9(S)-HODE was also a more potent stimulator of human G2A than a series of mono-hydroxy arachidonic acid metabolites. GPR132 was initially described as a pH sensing receptor; the role(s) of 9-HODEs as well as other linoleic and arachidonic acid metabolites in activating GPR132 under the physiological and pathological conditions in which it is implicated to be involved(see (see GPR132 for a listing of these conditions) have not yet been determined. This determination, as it might apply to humans, is made difficult by the inability of these HODEs to activate rodent GPR132 and therefore to be analyzed in rodent models.

== Biological and clinical relevancy ==
=== As markers of disease involving oxidative stress ===
Various measurements of tissue and blood levels of reactive oxygen species have been used as markers of diseases in which these species are generated and may contribute to tissue injury and systemic disturbances; examples of such diseases include a wide range of neurological, cardiovascular, infectious, autoimmune, and genetic diseases (see oxidative stress). HODEs measurements have been evaluated as markers for many of these oxygen-stress-related diseases. These measurements commonly use saponification methods to release HODEs bound by acylation to other molecules; they therefore measure not only free HODEs but also HODEs acylated to phospholipids, glycerides, cholesterol, and other lipids.

Studies find that 1) 9(S)-HODE (and 13(S)-HODE) levels are elevated in the plasma of older patients with early-stage cataracts compared to non-cataract subjects; 2) 9-HODE (and 13-HODE) are increased in the low density lipoproteins of patients with rheumatoid arthritis compared to healthy subjects as well as in the destructive but not normal bone tissue of the rheumatoid arthritic patients; 3) total HODEs (includes 9-HODE and 13-HODE stereoisomers) are higher in the plasma and liver of patients with hepatitis C and hepatitis B chronic viral infections as well as in the plasma and red blood cells of patients with Alzheimer's disease compared to healthy subjects; 4) 9-HODE and 9-oxoODE (as well as 13-HODE and 13-oxo-ODE) levels were elevated in the serum and/or pancreatic secretions of patients with pancreatitis compared to control subjects; 5) levels of the hydroperoxy precursors to 9-HODE and 13-HODE are elevated in the plasma and/or red blood cells of patients with Alzheimer's disease, atherosclerosis, diabetes, diabetic nephritis, non-alcoholic steatohepatitis, and alcoholic steatohepatitis compared to healthy subjects. These studies suggest that high levels of the HODEs may be useful to indicate the presence and progression of the cited diseases. Since, however, the absolute values of HODEs found in different studies vary greatly, since HODE levels vary with dietary linoleic acid intake, since HODEs may form during the processing of tissues, and since abnormal HODE levels are not linked to a specific disease, the use of these metabolites as markers has not attained clinical usefulness. HODE markers may find usefulness as markers of specific disease, type of disease, and/or progression of disease when combined with other disease markers.

=== As mediators of oxidative-stress-related diseases ===
Some of the studies cited above have suggested that 9-HODEs, 13-HODEs, their hydroperoxy counterparts, and/or their oxo counterparts contribute mechanistically to these oxidative-stress-related diseases. That is, the free radical oxidation of linoleic acid makes these products which then proceed to contribute to the tissue injury, DNA damage, and/or systemic dysfunctions that characterize the diseases. Furthermore, certain of these HODE-related products may serve as signals to activate pathways that combat the reactive oxygen species and in this and other ways the oxidative stress. It remains unclear whether or not the HODEs and their counterparts promote, dampen, or merely reflect oxidative-stress-related diseases.

=== As mediators of pain perception ===
9(S)-HODE, 9(R)-HODE, and 9-oxoODE, along with the other OXLAMs, appear to act through the TRPV1 receptor (see above section on Direct actions) mediate the perception of acute and chronic pain induced by heat, UV light, and inflammation in the skin of rodents. These studies propose that the OXLAM-TRPV1 circuit (with 9(S)-HODE being the most potent TRPV1-activating OXLAM) similarly contributes to the perception of pain in humans.

=== As contributors to atherosclerosis ===
9-HODEs, 13-HODEs, and low density lipoprotein which has been oxidized so that it contains HODEs stimulate the expression of interleukin 1β mRNA in and its extracellular release from human peripheral blood monocyte-derived macrophages; interleukin 1β is implicated in the proliferation of smooth muscle cells that occurs in atherosclerosis and contributes to blood vessel narrowing.
