= Eriogonum longifolium var. harperi =

Scientific classification
- Kingdom: Plantae
- Clade: Tracheophytes
- Clade: Angiosperms
- Clade: Eudicots
- Order: Caryophyllales
- Family: Polygonaceae
- Genus: Eriogonum
- Species: E. longifolium
- Variety: E. l. var. harperi

Trinomial name
- Eriogonum longifolium var. harperi (Goodman) Reveal

Variety of wild buckwheat

Eriogonum longifolium var. harperi, also known as Harper's buckwheat or Harper's umbrella plant, is a dicot of the family Polygonaceae, found in areas of nutrient-poor shale soils in Alabama, Kentucky and Tennessee. It lives inconspicuously in an immature vegetative stage for four or more years before developing a flowering stalk, then flowers and dies. It is listed as an endangered species by the state of Tennessee. It has eleven small populations in Alabama and five in Tennessee but its survival in Kentucky is uncertain. According to a leading expert, Professor James L. Reveal of the University of Maryland, its Kentucky population has been reportedly extirpated. Its 2006 Alabama Natural Heritage Program ranking was G4T2S1, demonstrating an opinion that it was "critically imperiled" in that state.

== Plant communities ==
One of the larger E. longifolium var. harperi populations is found on TVA property in northern Alabama and is estimated to be over 700 plants. There the umbrella plants cohabit with prickly pear (Opuntia spp.) and false aloe (Manfreda virginica) in an upland calcareous cliff plant community. Their foothold is attributed to human removal of competitors to allow a better view of the Tennessee River from one of the buildings on the property.

Another northern Alabama population is found on a cedar glade site which is owned by the Alabama Nature Conservancy. This plant community is home to many other rare and endangered plants including Alabama glade cress (Leavenworthia alabamica), Alabama larkspur (Delphinium alabamicum), glade quillwort (Isoëtes butleri), lyrate bladderpod (Paysonia lyrata), Nashville breadroot (Pediomelum subacaule), prairie Indian plantain (Arnoglossum plantagineum), Tennessee milk vetch (Astragalus tennesseensis), and yellow sunnybell (Schoenolirion croceum).

== See also ==
Immature Harper's umbrella plant surrounded by poor, rocky soil

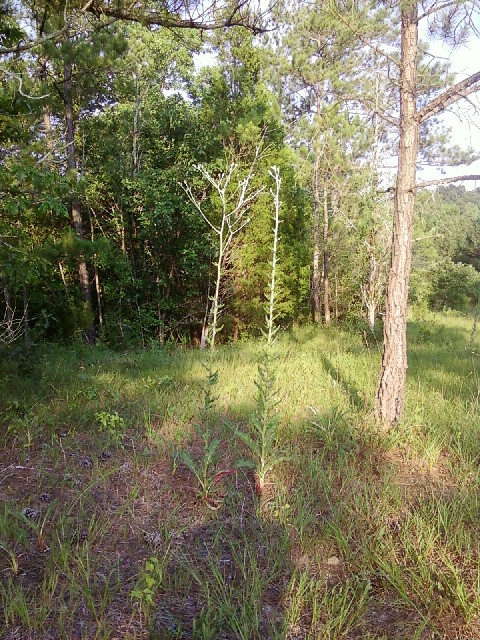
Harper's umbrella plant stalks

- Buckwheat
- Eriogonum - North American wild buckwheat
- Eriogonum longifolium - longleaf eriogonum or long-leaf wild buckwheat
- Eriogonum longifolium var. gnaphalifolium - scrub buckwheat
- Eriogonum longifolium var. lindheimeri
- Plant community
- Soils retrogression and degradation

== External resources ==
- Alabama inventory list 2003 (PDF)-see page 47
- Alabama Prairie Grove Glades protected site
- Tennessee endangered plant list from state.tn.us (PDF)-see page 15
- University of Tennessee Herbarium link with photos
- USDA List of Tennessee state protected plants
