= Bladderpod =

Bladderpod is a common name for several plants and may refer to:

- Alyssoides utriculata, a species of flowering plant in the family Brassicaceae
- Cleome isomeris, a species of flowering plant in the family Cleomaceae
- Lesquerella, a genus of flowering plants in the Family Brassicaceae, now considered a synonym of Physaria
- Lobelia inflata, a species of flowering plant in the family Campanulaceae
- Paysonia, a genus of flowering plants in the family Brassicaceae
- Peritoma arborea, a species of flowering plant in the family Cleomaceae
- Physaria, a genus of flowering plants in the family Brassicaceae
