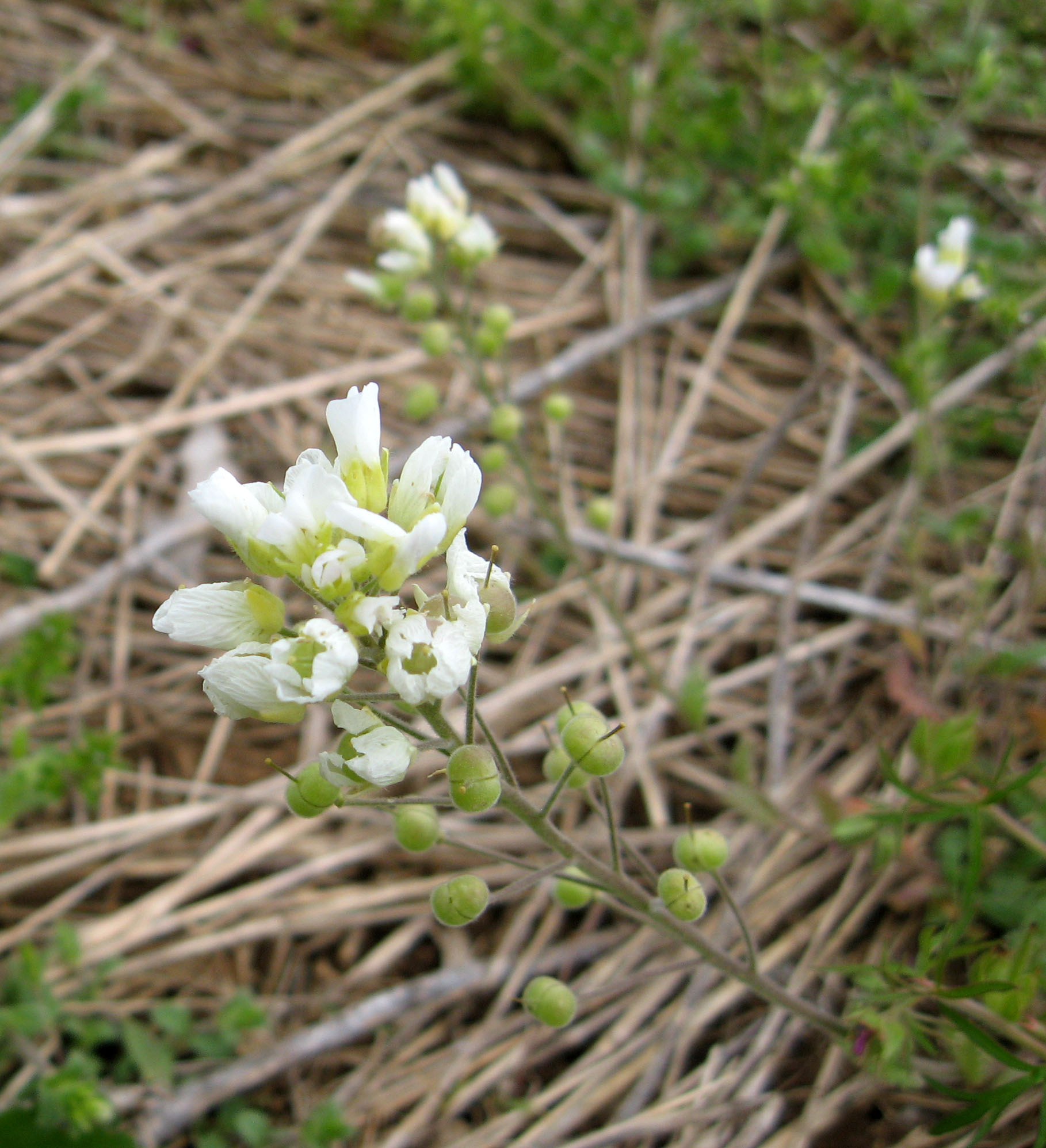

Conservation status
- Critically Imperiled (NatureServe)

Scientific classification
- Kingdom: Plantae
- Clade: Tracheophytes
- Clade: Angiosperms
- Clade: Eudicots
- Clade: Rosids
- Order: Brassicales
- Family: Brassicaceae
- Genus: Paysonia
- Species: P. stonensis

Binomial name
- Paysonia stonensis (Rollins) O'Kane & Al-Shehbaz

Synonyms
- Lesquerella stonensis

= Paysonia stonensis =

Species of flowering plant

Paysonia stonensis (syn. Lesquerella stonensis) is a species of flowering plant in the family Brassicaceae, known by the common name Stones River bladderpod. It is endemic to Tennessee in the United States, where it is limited to Rutherford County. It grows only in the floodplains of the Stones River, and certain tributaries.

== Description ==
Paysonia stonensis is an annual herb with densely hairy, erect stems growing 20 to 40 centimeters tall. The basal leaves are lobed and measure up to six centimeters long, and leaves higher on the stem are shorter and toothed on the edges; they clasp the stem at their bases. The leaves are very hairy. The flowers have white petals with narrowed yellow bases. The flowers are fragrant. The fruit is a nearly rounded silicle, containing small seeds. This species is similar to Paysonia perforata; the two are told apart by the hair distribution on the fruits.

== Natural history ==
It grows on floodplains, where it is subject to disturbance. The disturbance may be caused naturally by flooding, or artificially by agricultural activity. The plants take over on sites which have been turned over, revealing fresh soil. A soil seed bank yields new seedlings when conditions are right. Seeds can persist in the seed bank for at least six years. Seed dormancy is broken when temperatures reach spring and summer highs, and germination occurs in September and October. Those that do not germinate become dormant again when temperatures drop.

== Conservation ==
The number of occurrences seems to vary year to year, with up to 20 in good years. It is only solidly established at two sites. Threats to the species include loss of habitat when it is converted to residential or other use. Agencies such as the Tennessee Department of Environment and Conservation are involved in preserving the cycles of disturbance in the habitat that make conditions right for the plant.
