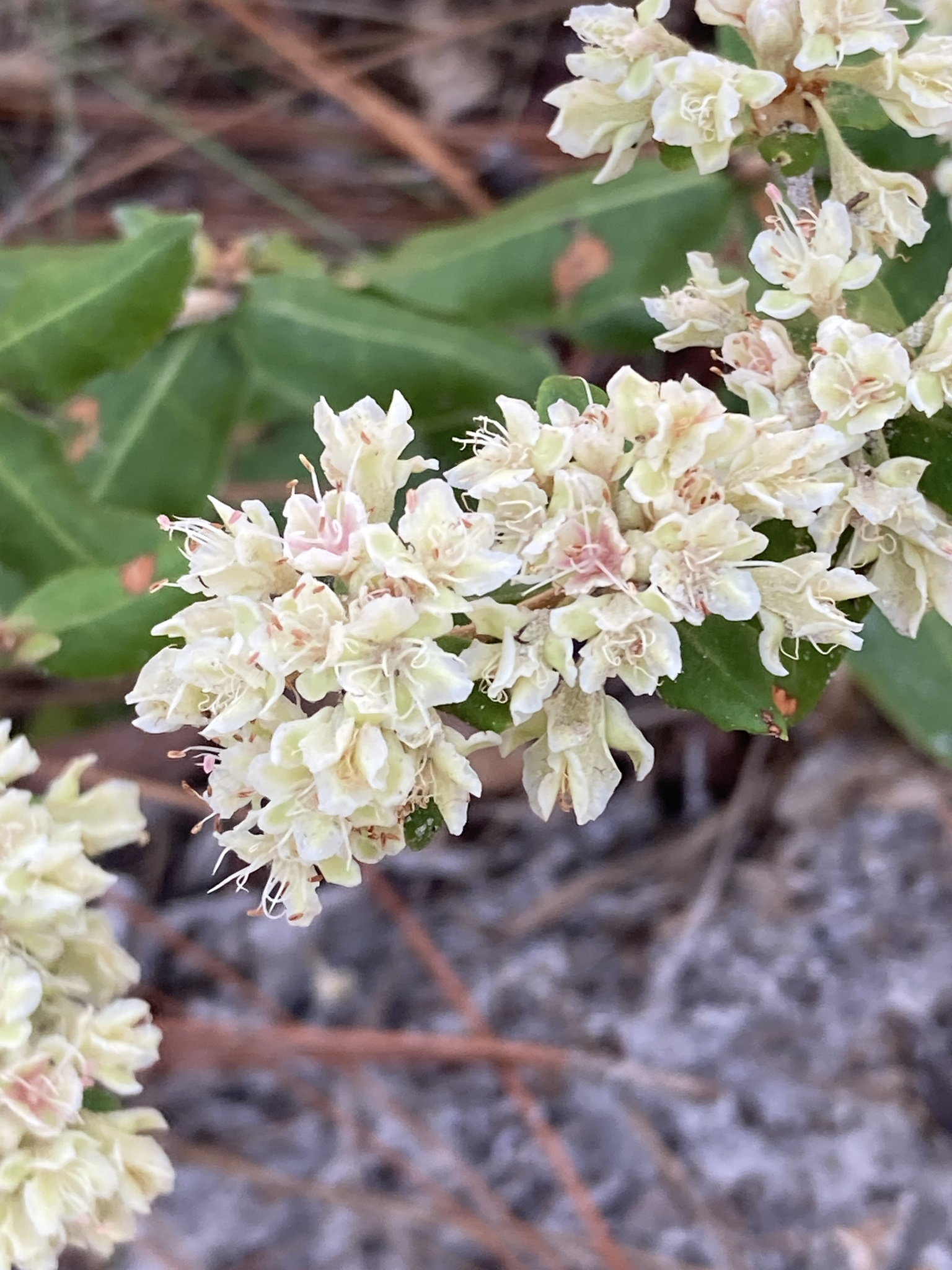

Conservation status
- Secure (NatureServe)

Scientific classification
- Kingdom: Plantae
- Clade: Tracheophytes
- Clade: Angiosperms
- Clade: Eudicots
- Order: Caryophyllales
- Family: Polygonaceae
- Genus: Eriogonum
- Species: E. tomentosum

Binomial name
- Eriogonum tomentosum Michx.

= Eriogonum tomentosum =

Species of wild buckwheat

Eriogonum tomentosum, commonly referred to as dogtongue buckwheat or dogtongue wild buckwheat, is a species in the Polygonaceae (smartweed or knotweed) family.

== Distribution ==
It is found in Southeastern US states including Alabama, Florida, Georgia, North Carolina and South Carolina.

== See also ==
- Eriogonum longifolium var. gnaphalifolium
