= Paysonia perforata =

Conservation status
- Critically Imperiled (NatureServe)

Scientific classification
- Kingdom: Plantae
- Clade: Tracheophytes
- Clade: Angiosperms
- Clade: Eudicots
- Clade: Rosids
- Order: Brassicales
- Family: Brassicaceae
- Genus: Paysonia
- Species: P. perforata

Binomial name
- Paysonia perforata (Rollins) O'Kane & Al-Shehbaz

Synonyms
- Lesquerella perforata

Species of flowering plant

Paysonia perforata, known by the common name Spring Creek bladderpod, is a rare species of flowering plant in the mustard family. It is endemic to Tennessee in the United States, where it is known only from Wilson County. This very rare plant is threatened by the loss and degradation of its habitat. It is federally listed as an endangered species.

== Description ==
This is an annual herb growing mostly erect to a height of 10 to 15 centimeters. The leaves are auriculate (ear-shaped), up to 5 centimeters long by 1.5 wide, and have toothed or lobed edges. They are usually hairy. The flowers have white or lavender petals with a yellow tinge at the bases. The fruit is an inflated silique drying to a papery texture and measuring about half a centimeter wide. This species is similar to Paysonia stonensis, another Tennessee endemic, from which it differs only in the arrangement of hairs on its fruits.

== Natural history ==
This plant only grows in the Central Basin of Tennessee, where there are 21 known occurrences in Wilson County. The occurrences are almost all located on the floodplains of two or three creeks within a five-mile radius of Lebanon. The plant is adapted to a regime of periodic flooding as the creeks swell. The scouring action of the floodwaters maintain a floodplain that is clear of perennial grasses and large or woody vegetation that would otherwise take hold and compete with the bladderpod. Large sections of this floodplain region have been converted to agricultural use, and the soil disturbance created by plowing has replaced the natural disturbance of flooding. Certain agricultural practices do not adversely affect the plant, such as delaying spring plowing until the time of year when the plant has finished its reproduction. The fruit is mature and splits to release seeds in late April and early May. Other practices, such as no-till farming, do not favor the plant's growth because they do not produce the soil disturbance that it would require in nature. Plowing the soil during times of the year when this annual plant has not yet matured and set seed can prevent the species' propagation.

The floodplain soil is silty and overlies limestone substrates. The habitat includes natural floodplains and farm land such as crop fields and pastures. Other rare plants in the Nashville Basin include Boechera perstellata, Dalea foliosa, Dalea gattingeri, and Echinacea tennesseensis.

== Conservation ==
The lack of disturbance in the habitat causes its degradation by allowing the encroachment of large vegetation that crowds out the annual plants. The habitat in this region is being destroyed outright, however, by other processes, particularly the development of residential, commercial, and industrial complexes and associated utilities such as water lines and sewers. The plant's range is on the outer fringe of the Nashville metropolitan area, which is undergoing rapid growth. These threats prompted the addition of this plant to the endangered species list of the US.
