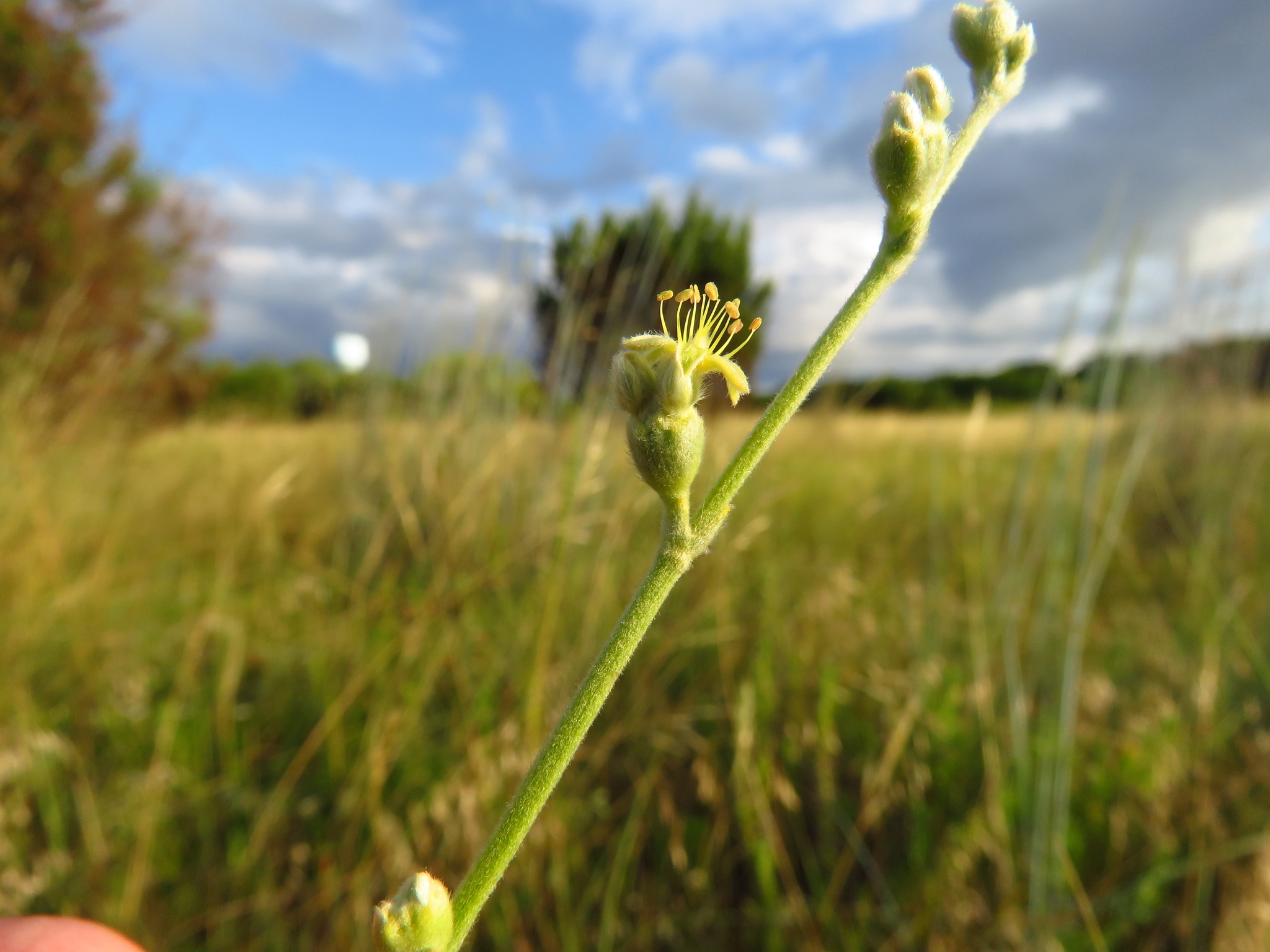

Conservation status
- Apparently Secure (NatureServe)

Scientific classification
- Kingdom: Plantae
- Clade: Tracheophytes
- Clade: Angiosperms
- Clade: Eudicots
- Order: Caryophyllales
- Family: Polygonaceae
- Genus: Eriogonum
- Species: E. longifolium

Binomial name
- Eriogonum longifolium Nutt.

= Eriogonum longifolium =

Species of wild buckwheat

Eriogonum longifolium, the longleaf eriogonum or long-leaf wild buckwheat, is a dicot of the family Polygonaceae. In addition to populations of E. longifolium var. longifolium found in Arkansas, Kansas, Louisiana, Missouri, New Mexico, Oklahoma, and Texas, there are varieties or subspecies that are geographically isolated and at various levels of endangerment. According to the University of Michigan Native American Ethnobotony database, Eriogonum longifolium has been used as a food by the Kiowa and as a medicinal by the Comanche.

Eriogonuum longifolium leaves are described as being lanceolate, oblanceolate or oblong and with tomentose coating; the plant develops flowering stems which are up to 17 dm (67 in) tall.

== Varieties or subspecies ==
- Tennessee, Alabama and Kentucky: E. longifolium var. harperi (Harper's buckwheat or Harper's umbrella plant)
- Florida: E. longifolium var. gnaphalifolium Gandog, (sometimes known as Eriogonum floridanum Small) - Scrub Buckwheat or Longleaf Wild Buckwheat
- New Mexico: E. longifolium var. lindheimeri
