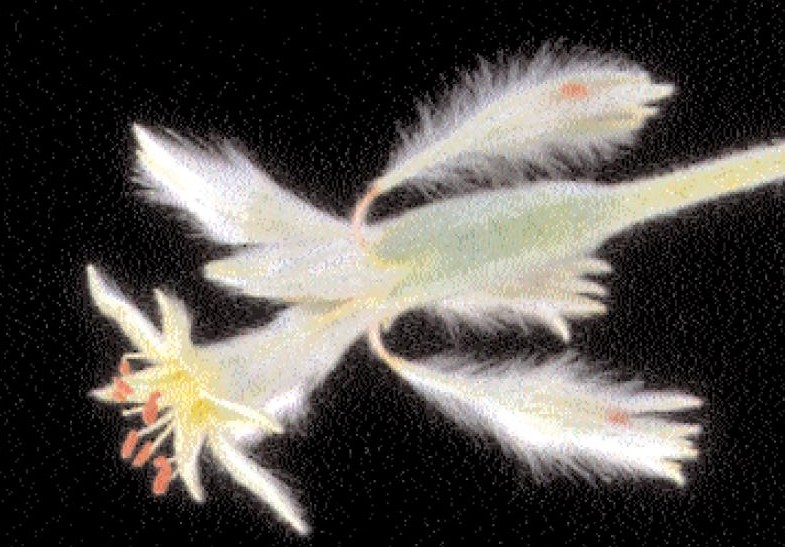
- Flower

Conservation status
- Threatened (ESA)

Scientific classification
- Kingdom: Plantae
- Clade: Tracheophytes
- Clade: Angiosperms
- Clade: Eudicots
- Order: Caryophyllales
- Family: Polygonaceae
- Genus: Eriogonum
- Species: E. longifolium
- Variety: E. l. var. gnaphalifolium

Trinomial name
- Eriogonum longifolium var. gnaphalifolium Gand.

= Eriogonum longifolium var. gnaphalifolium =

Variety of wild buckwheat

Eriogonum longifolium Nutt. var. gnaphalifolium Gand. (also known as Eriogonum floridanum Small), commonly referred to as scrub buckwheat is a dicot of the Polygonaceae (smartweed or knotweed) family. It is listed as threatened in the US and endangered in Florida. Within Florida its most closely related species is Eriogonum tomentosum however there are three other varieties of Eriogonum longifolium found in other areas of the US.

Scrub buckwheat is found in areas of scrub, flatland and sand hills.

== Description ==
It is described as generally having no more than three flowering stems, but stronger plants may have more. Its flowers are described as emerging from an involucre or protective cup found on each branch of its terminal corymb. Flowers are pollinated by a variety of solitary bees, solitary digger wasps and twig nesting wasps, flies and social wasps.

According to the US Fish and Wildlife Service there is an active habitat management program. Also, there is significant interest in studying its fire tolerance and tendency to bloom or to die following prescribed burning of competing undergrowth.

== See also ==
- Eriogonum longifolium var. harperi
- Eriogonum longifolium var. lindheimeri
