= Lutzia cretica =

Scientific classification
- Kingdom: Plantae
- Clade: Tracheophytes
- Clade: Angiosperms
- Clade: Eudicots
- Clade: Rosids
- Order: Brassicales
- Family: Brassicaceae
- Genus: Lutzia; Gand.
- Species: L. cretica

Binomial name
- Lutzia cretica (L.) Greuter & Burdet

Synonyms
- Alyssoides cretica (L.) Medik.; Alyssoides tomentosa Moench; Alyssum creticum L.; Alyssum oocarpum Gand.; Alyssum paniculatum Desf.; Lutzia fruticosa Gand.; Scleroptychis cretica (L.) Degen; Vesicaria cretica (L.) Poir.; Vesicaria paniculata (Desf.) Desv.

Species of plant

Lutzia cretica is a species of herbaceous plant endemic to the Aegean Islands of Greece. It is the only species in the genus Lutzia, which belongs to the cabbage family Brassicaceae.

Prior to a 2015 reappraisal based on molecular phylogenetic data, the plant was most commonly included in the genus Alyssoides as Alyssoides cretica.

Lutzia cretica grows into a characteristic spherical bush. Its leaves are greyish-white and tomentose (covered in soft dense hairs). It produces large yellow flowers between February and April, and the fruits can remain on the plant until June.

It grows in the crevices of limestone cliffs and ravines, from sea level up to 400 m (1,300 ft), less frequently as high as 800 m (2,600 ft). It is found on the islands of Crete (mostly the central and eastern parts and on some small offshore islets), Kasos, Karpathos, and Astypalaia.
