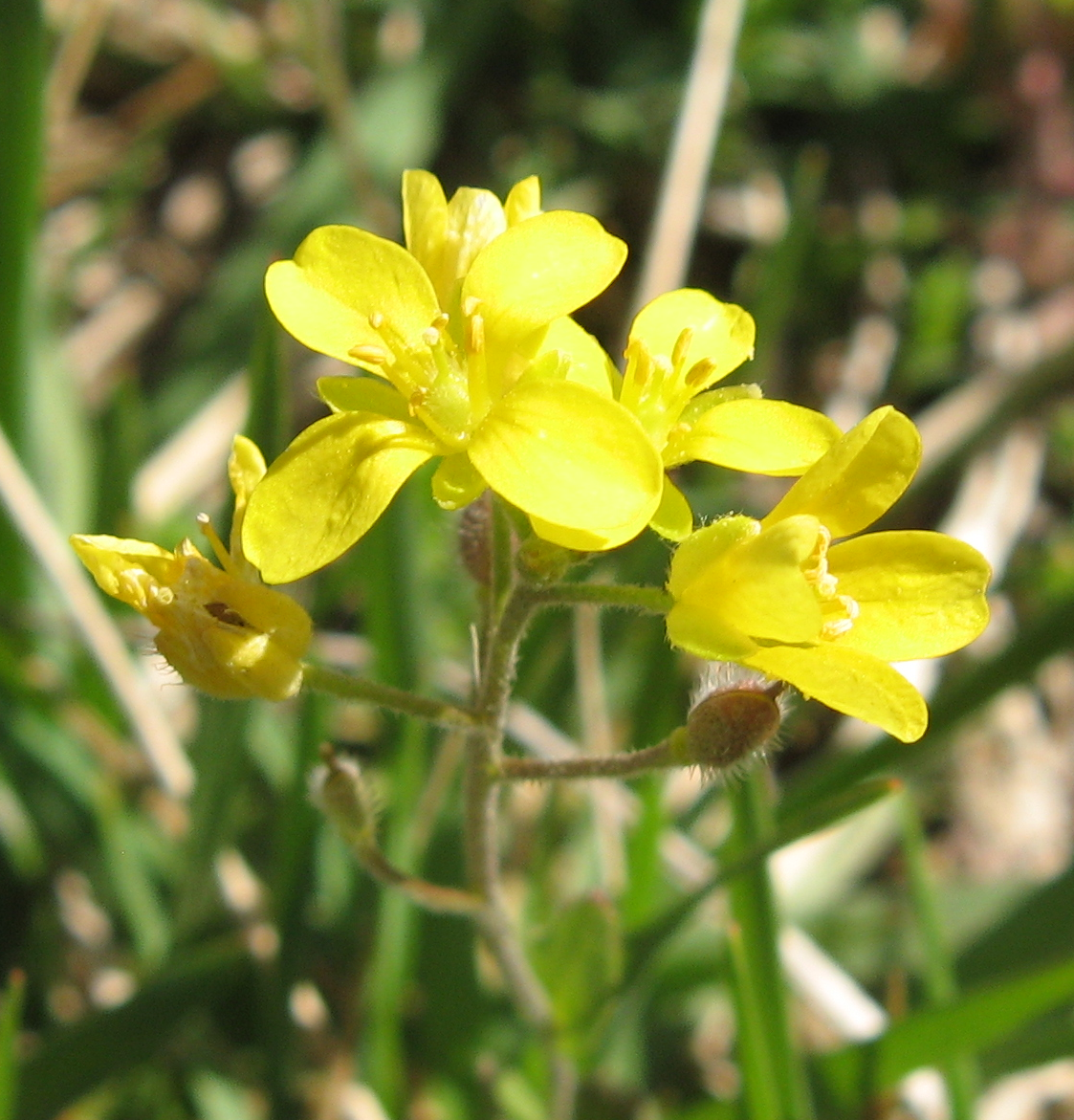

Conservation status
- Apparently Secure (NatureServe)

Scientific classification
- Kingdom: Plantae
- Clade: Tracheophytes
- Clade: Angiosperms
- Clade: Eudicots
- Clade: Rosids
- Order: Brassicales
- Family: Brassicaceae
- Genus: Paysonia
- Species: P. lescurii

Binomial name
- Paysonia lescurii (A.Gray) O'Kane & Al-Shehbaz

= Paysonia lescurii =

Species of plant

Paysonia lescurii is a species of flowering plant in the family Brassicaceae known by the common names Lescur's bladderpod or Nashville mustard. It is native to Middle Tennessee in the United States, where it can be found in wet fields, lawns, and roadsides. It is also present in neighboring areas of the U.S. states of Kentucky and Alabama.

== Description ==
Paysonia lescurii typically grows from 6 to 12 inches (15 to 30 cm) tall and has small yellow flowers about 0.6 inches (1.5 cm) wide. The flowers have four petals and are borne in racemes up to 8 inches (20 cm) long. The stems are branched from the base and densely hairy. The basal leaves are 1 to 3 inches (3 to 8 cm) long and pinnately lobed. The smaller stem leaves are alternate, simple, and toothed to shallowly lobed with clasping bases.
