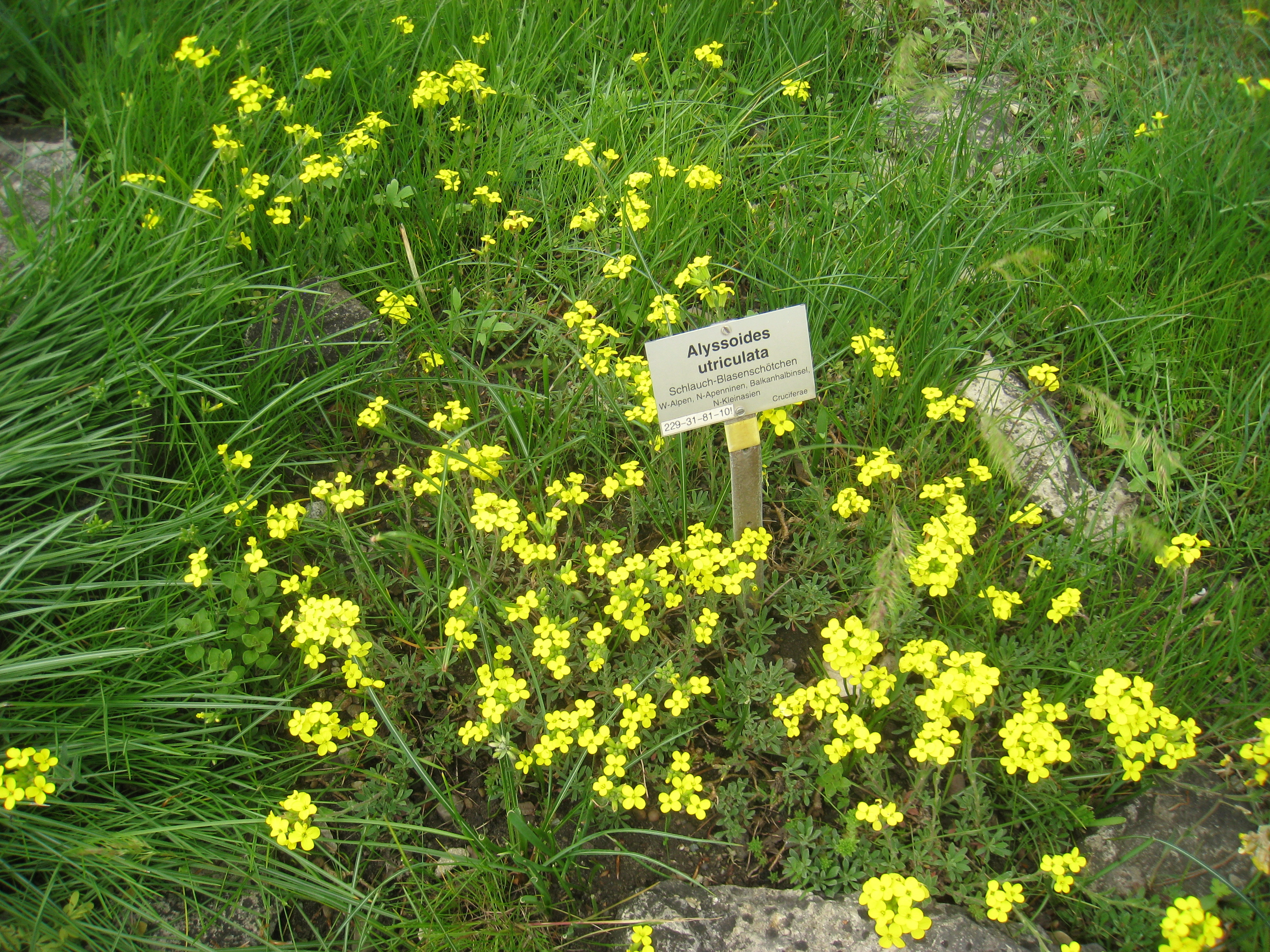

Scientific classification
- Kingdom: Plantae
- Clade: Tracheophytes
- Clade: Angiosperms
- Clade: Eudicots
- Clade: Rosids
- Order: Brassicales
- Family: Brassicaceae
- Genus: Alyssoides; Mill.
- Species: A. utriculata

Binomial name
- Alyssoides utriculata (L.) Medik.

Synonyms
- Alyssoides graeca (Reut. ex Boiss.) Jáv.; Alyssum graecum (Reut. ex Boiss.) Kuntze; Alyssum oederi Durande; Vesicaria graeca Reut. ex Boiss.; Vesicaria utriculata (L.) DC.

= Alyssoides =

Species of plant

Alyssoides is a genus of flowering plants in the family Brassicaceae containing a single species, Alyssoides utriculata. A herbaceous perennial plant native to Southern Europe and Turkey, it grows on dry rocky slopes and on calcareous rocks, reaching heights of 20 to 50 cm and blooming with yellow flowers between April and May–July.

The genus formerly contained a second species, Alyssoides cretica, but after molecular phylogenetic studies from 2008 and 2013 it was reassigned to the genus Lutzia.

There are two subspecies: the A. utricalata subsp. utriculata, and A. utriculata subsp. bulgarica, which characteristically differ by the pattern and shape of their hairs.

Alyssoides utriculata is used as an ornamental plant and in gardening may be referred to as inflated bladderseed or as (Greek) bladderpod (not to be confused with other plants named bladderpod).

== Distribution ==
The plant's distribution ranges from southern France to Turkey. It is found in the Massif Central of France, the Western Alps, the Apennines of Italy, the Dinaric Alps of Croatia, Bosnia and Herzegovina, Montenegro, and Albania; in western Kosovo, in Serbia (the Tara and Rtanj mountains among others), in the south of North Macedonia, in Greece (from low elevations up to 2200(-2500) m; relatively common in the north-east, in more isolated locations in the north (Vourinos, Vermion, Olympus, and a few localities in Pindus) and the central areas (Pentelikon, Parnis, Parnassus and Giona)), in Bulgaria (at elevations of 50–1900 m in Stara Planina, the Rhodopes, Strandzha and the southwest), southwestern Romania, and northern Anatolia.

== Gallery ==
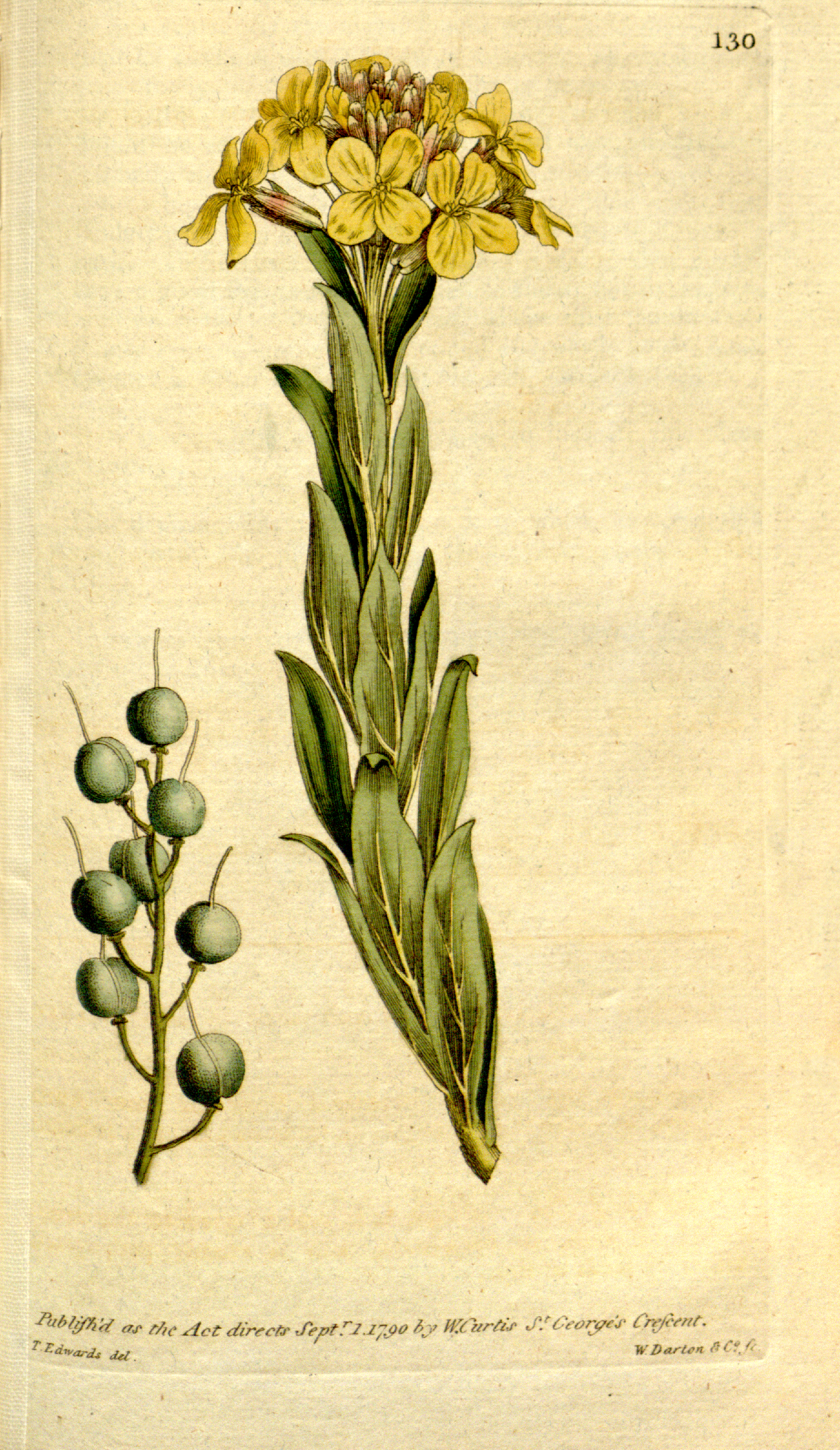
Botanical illustration

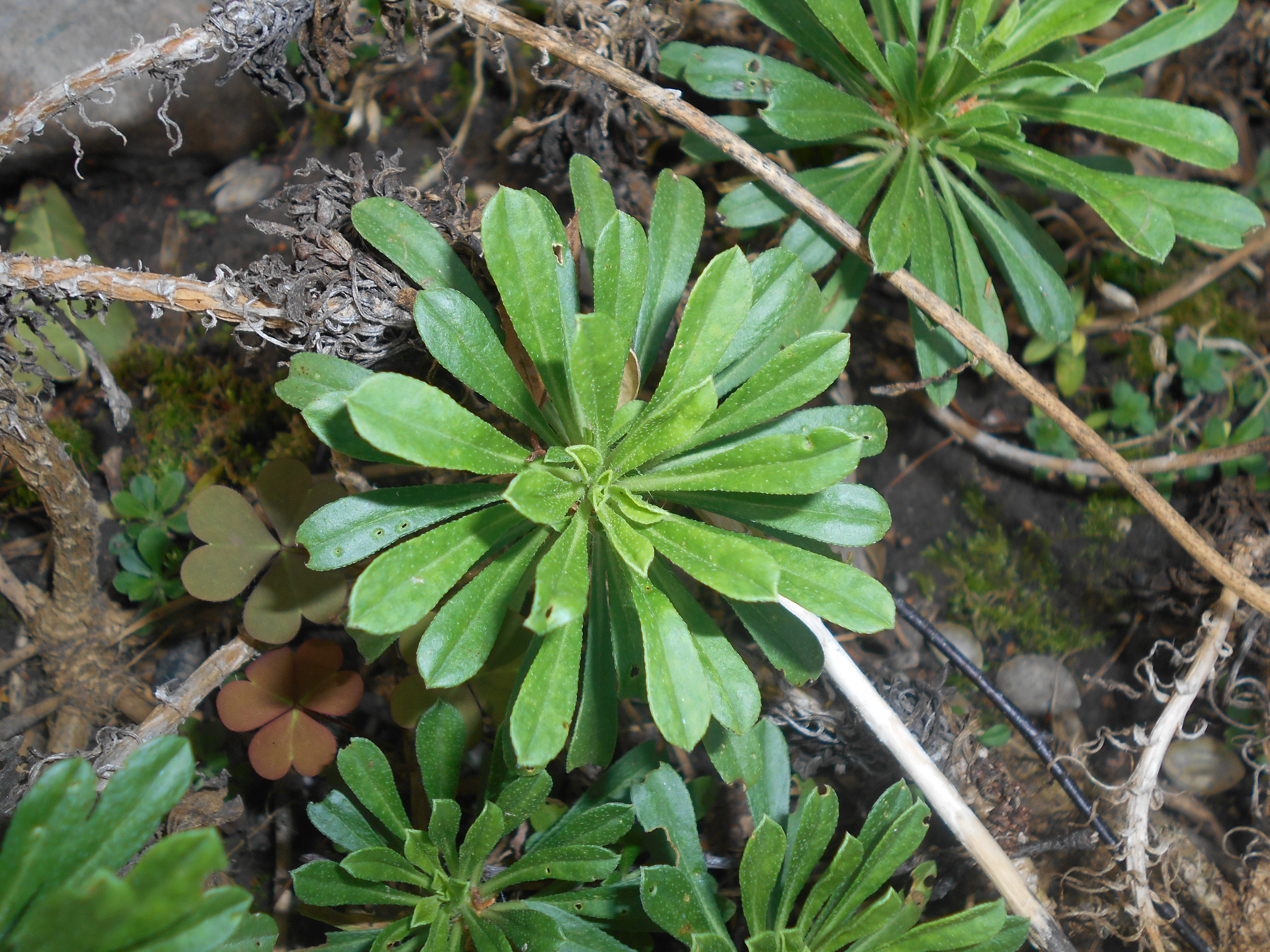

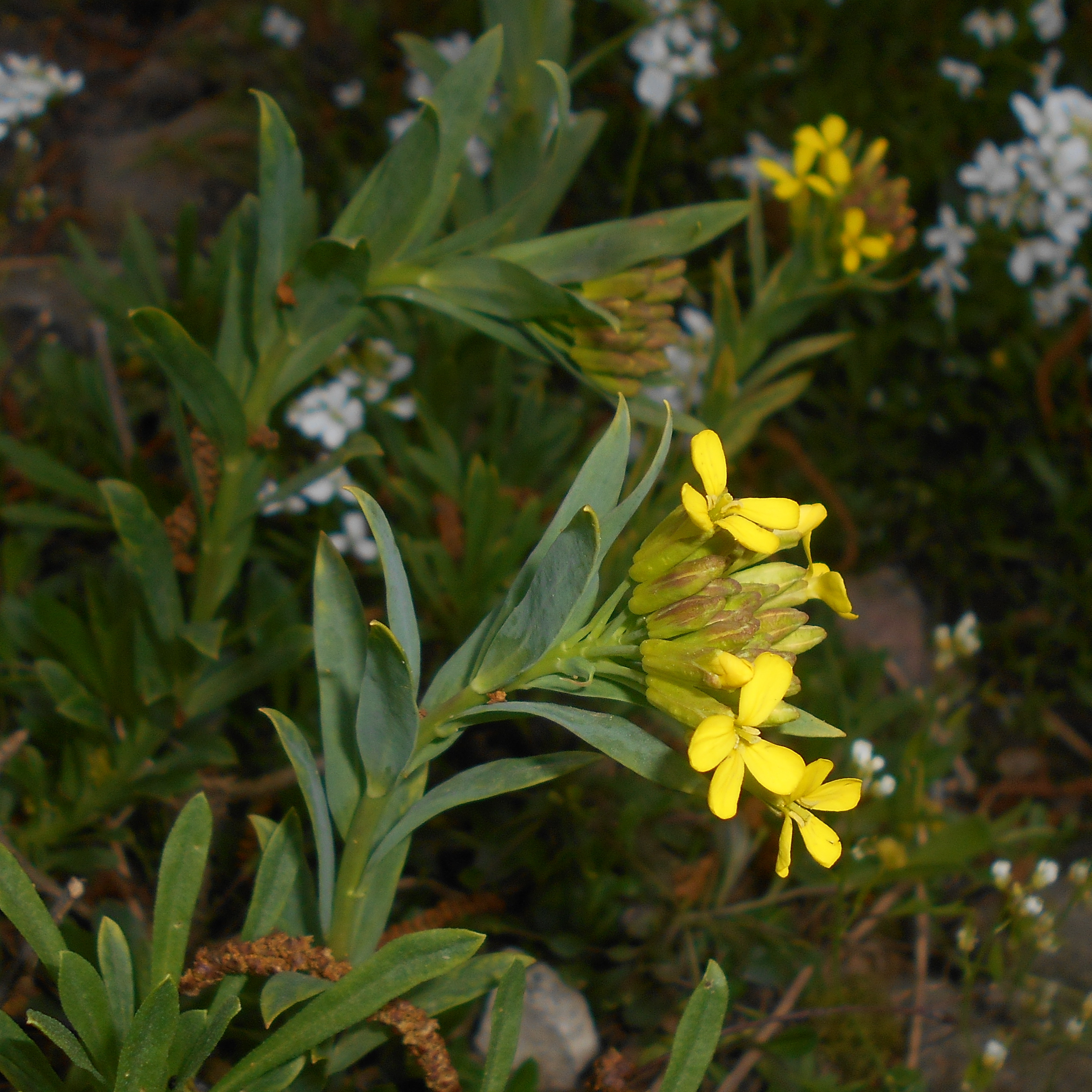

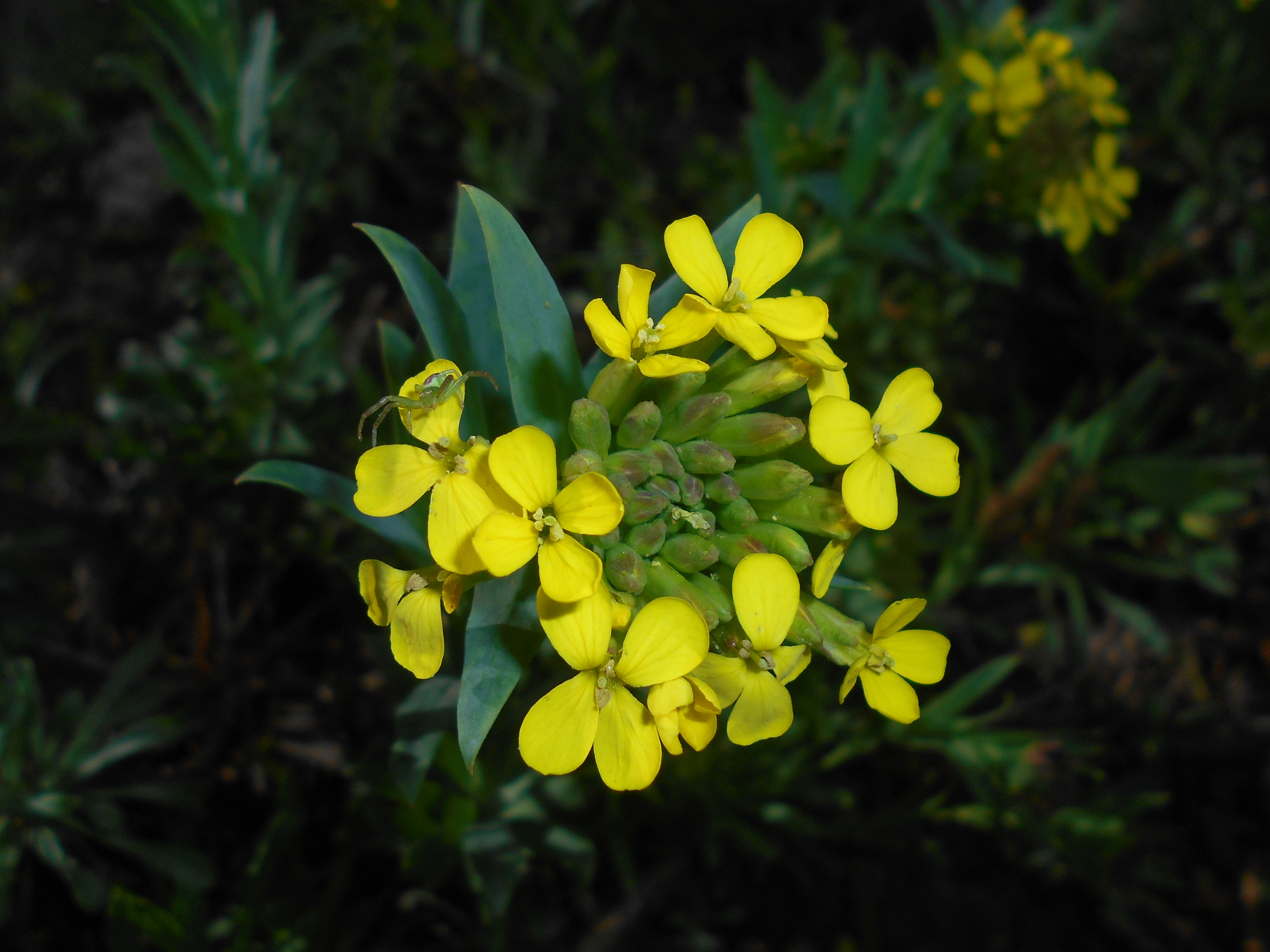
Inflorescence

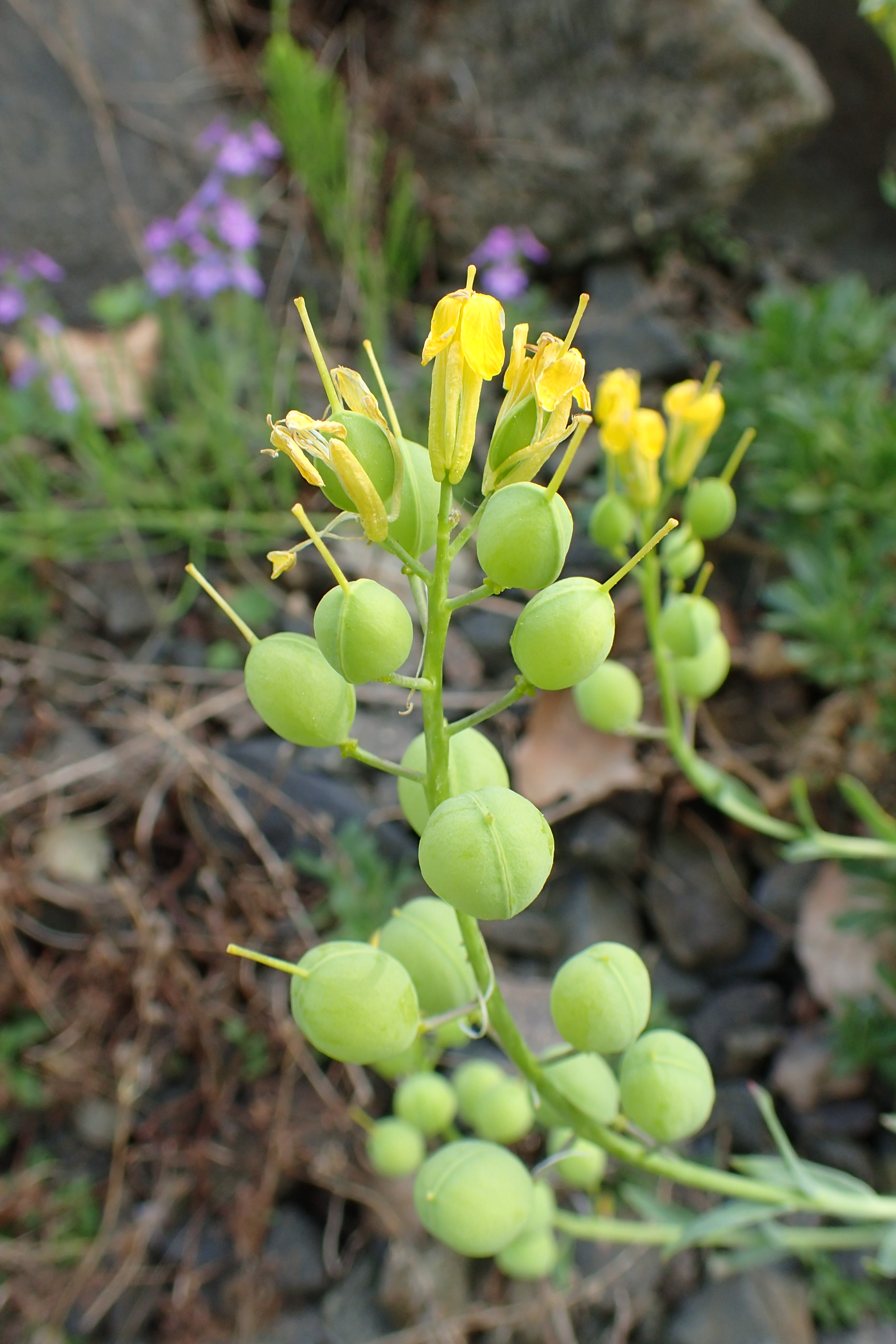

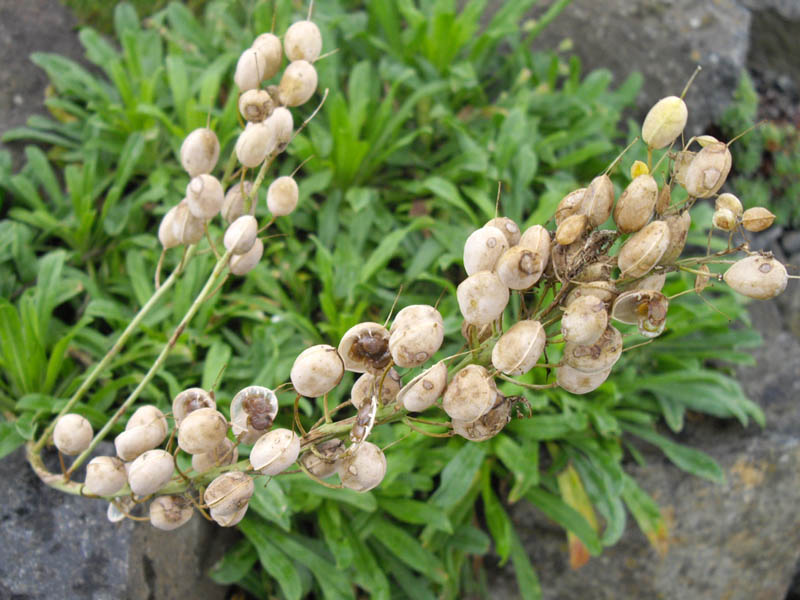
Fruits

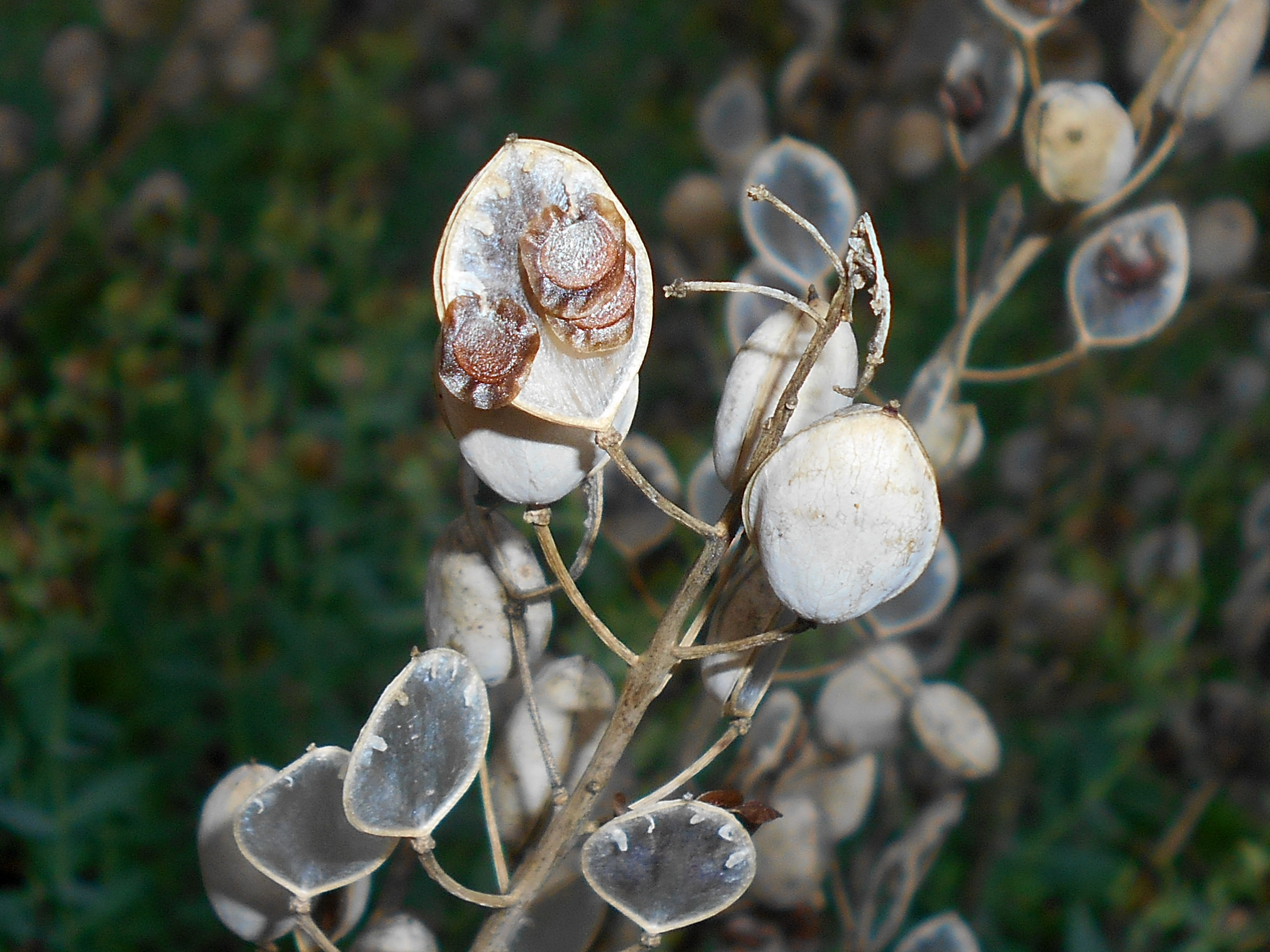
