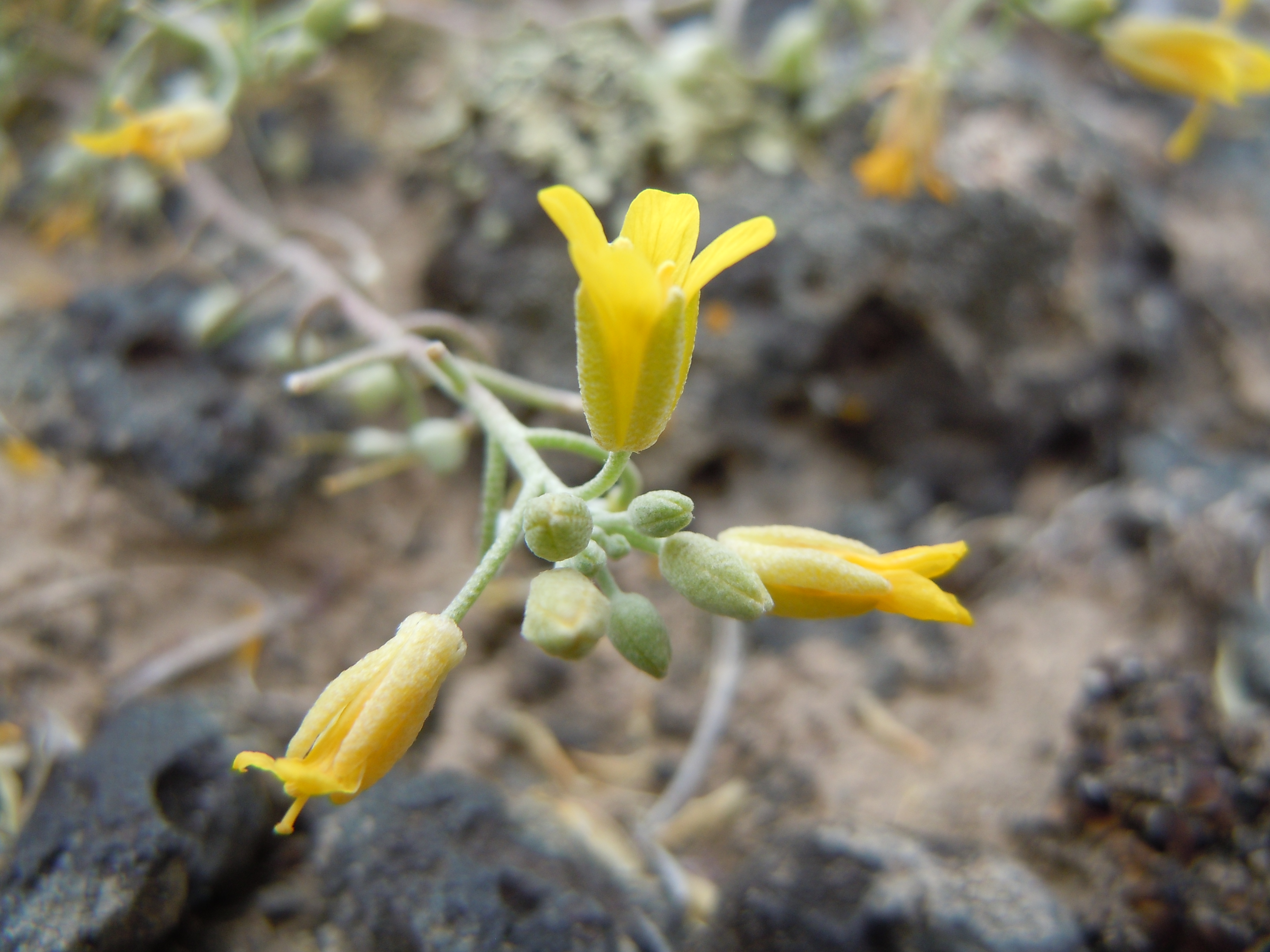

Conservation status
- Secure (NatureServe)

Scientific classification
- Kingdom: Plantae
- Clade: Tracheophytes
- Clade: Angiosperms
- Clade: Eudicots
- Clade: Rosids
- Order: Brassicales
- Family: Brassicaceae
- Genus: Physaria
- Species: P. ludoviciana

Binomial name
- Physaria ludoviciana (Nutt.) O'Kane & Al-Shehbaz

Synonyms
- List: Alyssum ludovicianum Nutt.; Lesquerella ludoviciana (Nutt.) S.Watson; Myagrum argenteum Pursh; Vesicaria ludoviciana (Nutt.) DC.

= Physaria ludoviciana =

Species of flowering plant in the cabbage family Brassicaceae

Physaria ludoviciana is a species of flowering plant in the mustard family Brassicaceae, with the common names of bladder pod, silver bladderpod, louisiana bladderpod, and foothill bladderpod. It used to be Lesquerella ludoviciana which is now a synonym. The plant is a source of auricolic acid, a rare fatty acid.

== Description ==
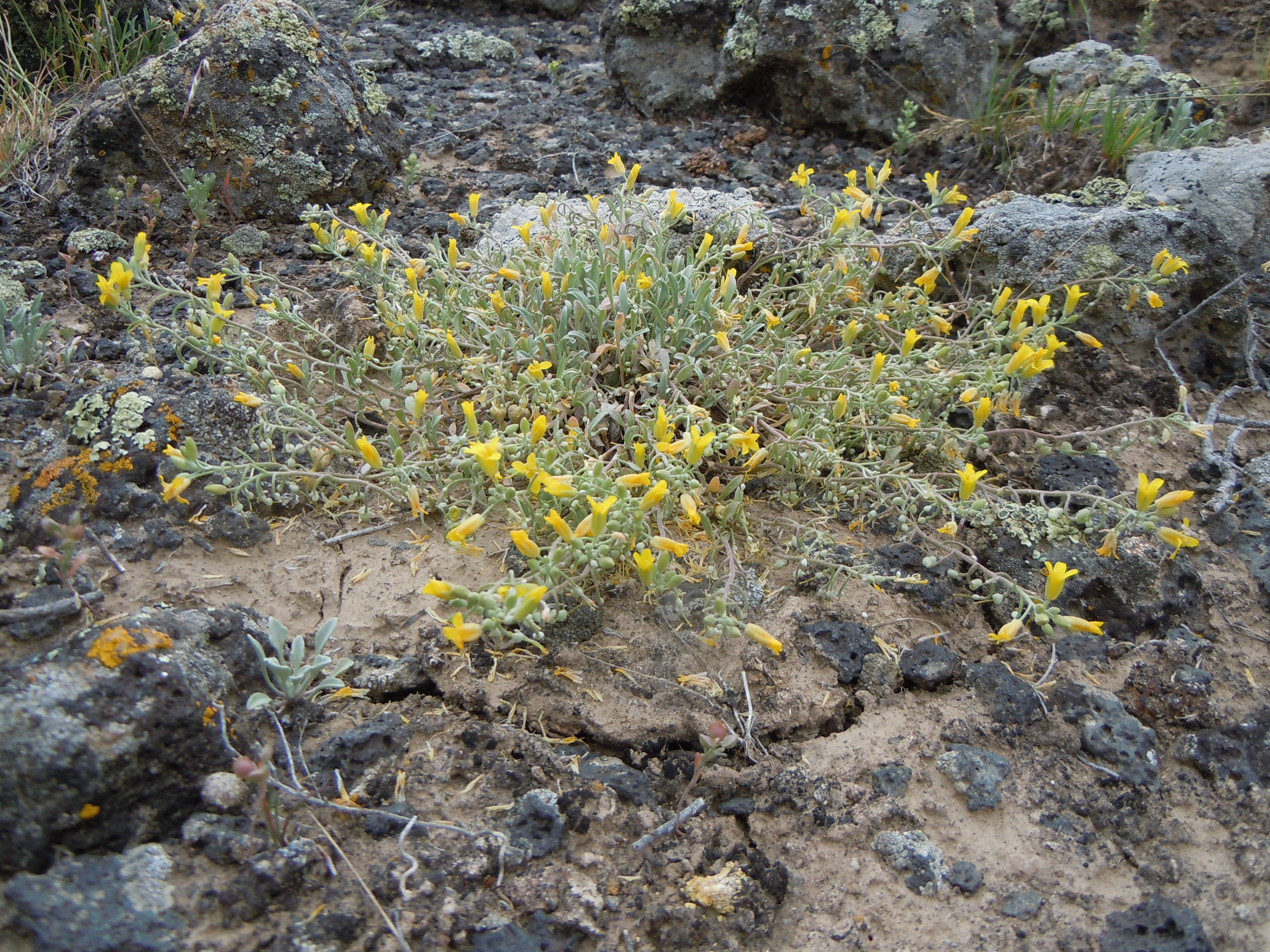
Physaria ludoviciana habit.

Physaria ludoviciana is a taprooted perennial, growing 6-16 inches tall. The flowers have four sepals and four yellow petals and six stamens. The leaves are simple, narrow, and covered with stellate-pilose hairs. The basal leaves are produced in a rosette. The two loculed fruits are a globe-like silicle with dense pilose hairs. Flowering occurs in early spring to mid/late summer, and some plants are polyploids.

== Distribution and habitat ==
It is an endangered species in Illinois and Minnesota, and a threatened species in Wisconsin. In all three states this species is outside of its main range which is more western, growing in the dry plains. The Minnesota populations are found around Red Wing in Goodhue County; they are 500 kilometers from the species main range in the west and it is speculated it was introduction there by the long-range dispersal of a single seed or they are remnants from when the environment was drier and the species had a greater natural range. The Minnesota plants are found in dry prairie on south-facing bluffs in sandy soil originating from weathered limestone; the populations are threatened by the encroachment of woody and invasive species due to human suppression of fires.

Physaria ludoviciana is avoided by grazing animals.
