= Eriogonum longifolium var. lindheimeri =

Scientific classification
- Kingdom: Plantae
- Clade: Tracheophytes
- Clade: Angiosperms
- Clade: Eudicots
- Order: Caryophyllales
- Family: Polygonaceae
- Genus: Eriogonum
- Species: E. longifolium
- Variety: E. l. var. lindheimeri

Trinomial name
- Eriogonum longifolium var. lindheimeri Gand.

Variety of wild buckwheat

Eriogonum longifolium var. lindheimeri, commonly known as Lindheimer's long-leaf eriogonum and Lindheimer's buckwheat, is a dicot of the family Polygonaceae, found in New Mexico and Texas.

== See also ==
- Eriogonum longifolium var. gnaphalifolium
- Eriogonum longifolium var. harperi
