= Auricolic acid =

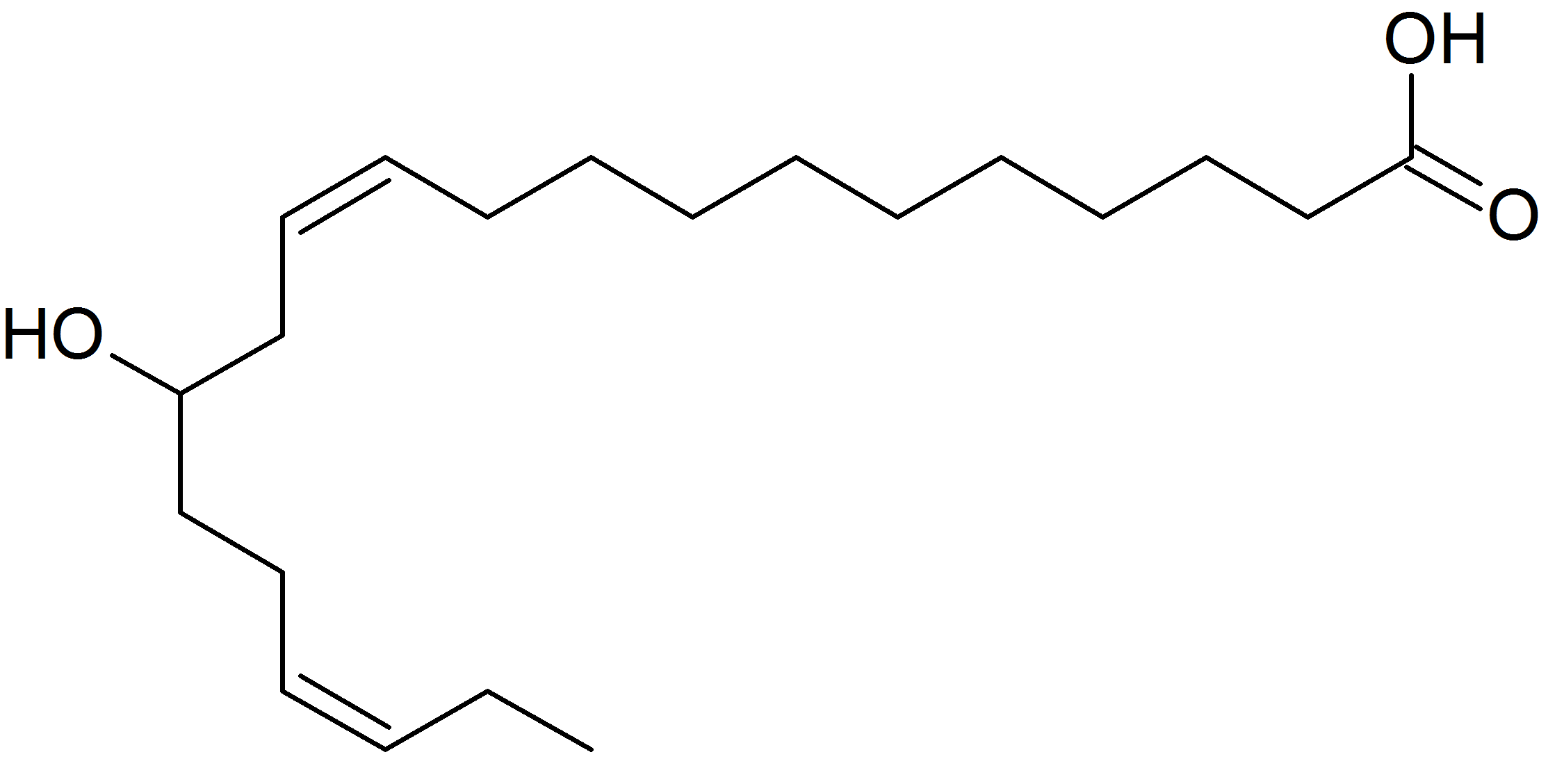

Names
- IUPAC name (11Z,17Z)-14-hydroxyicosa-11,17-dienoic acid

Identifiers
| CAS Number | 37780-50-0 |
| 3D model (JSmol) | Interactive image |
| ChEBI | CHEBI:186663 |
| PubChem CID | 73242169 |
- InChI: InChI=1S/C20H36O3/c1-2-3-4-13-16-19(21)17-14-11-9-7-5-6-8-10-12-15-18-20(22)23/h3-4,11,14,19,21H,2,5-10,12-13,15-18H2,1H3,(H,22,23)/b4-3-,14-11- Key: GWEIHUNYMRRZJJ-MOAWTDCJSA-N
- SMILES: CCC=CCCC(CC=CCCCCCCCCCC(=O)O)O

Properties
| Chemical formula | C_{20}H_{36}O_{3} |
| Molar mass | 324.505 g·mol^{−1} |
- Except where otherwise noted, data are given for materials in their standard state (at 25 °C [77 °F], 100 kPa). Infobox references

Auricolic acid is a linear fatty acid composed of 20 carbon atoms, with two double bonds at the position 11=12 and 17=18 and a hydroxyl-OH at the position 14. The compound's delta notation is 14-OH-20: 2Δ.

The acid is found in Lesquerella auriculata seed oil. Also, the compound has been isolated from Lesquerella ludoviciana, Lesquerella calcicola, Physaria saximontana and others from the genera Lesquerella and Physaria (Bladderpod oil).

== Discovery ==
The acid was initially isolated in 1937 by researchers Kleiman, Spencer, Earle, Nieschlag, Barclay in the oil of Lesquerella auriculata and Lesquerella densiflora with the concentration of auricolic acid being between 30% and 40% of the total fatty acids.
