= Paysonia auriculata =

Earleaf bladderpod

Scientific classification
- Kingdom: Plantae
- Clade: Tracheophytes
- Clade: Angiosperms
- Clade: Eudicots
- Clade: Rosids
- Order: Brassicales
- Family: Brassicaceae
- Genus: Paysonia
- Species: P. auriculata

Binomial name
- Paysonia auriculata (Engelm. & A. Gray) O'Kane & Al-Shehbaz

Synonyms
- Alyssum auriculatum (Engelm. & A. Gray) Kuntze; Lesquerella auriculata (Engelm. & A. Gray) S. Watson; Vesicaria auriculata Engelm. & A. Gray

Species of flowering plant

Paysonia auriculata, the earleaf bladderpod or plains eared bladderpod, is a plant species native to the south-central part of the United States. It is widespread in Oklahoma, with isolated populations in Sumner County (Kansas) and from four counties in Texas (Upshur, Austin, Kaufman and Navarro). It occurs in grasslands, prairies, disturbed areas, etc.

== Description ==
Paysonia auriculata is an annual herb up to 20 cm tall. Flowers are yellow, up to 12 mm across. Fruits are spherical, about 7 mm in diameter.

== Acid ==
The plant is a source of auricolic acid, a rare fatty acid.

== See also ==
- Bladderpod oil
