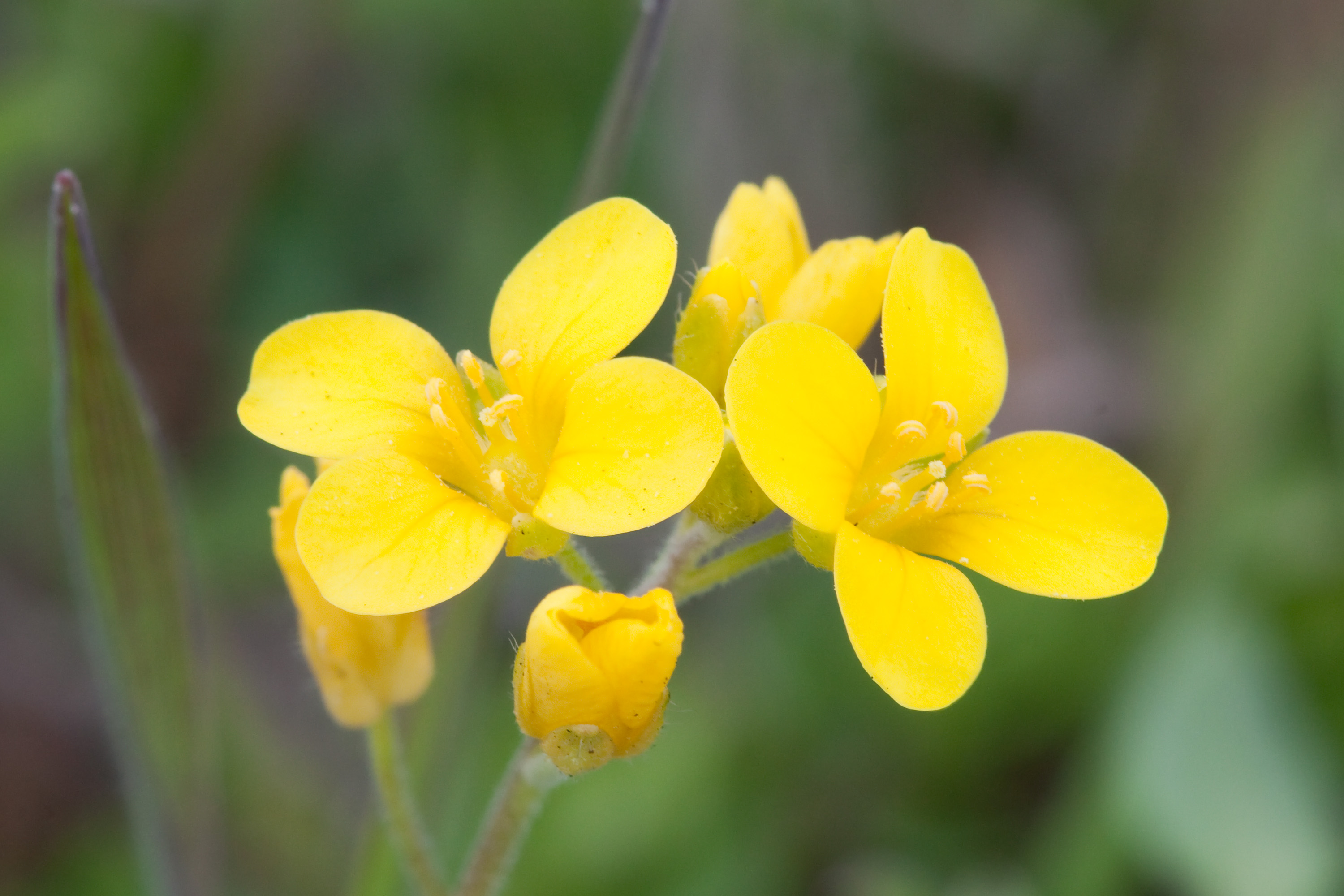
- Paysonia lescurii

Scientific classification
- Kingdom: Plantae
- Clade: Tracheophytes
- Clade: Angiosperms
- Clade: Eudicots
- Clade: Rosids
- Order: Brassicales
- Family: Brassicaceae
- Genus: Paysonia; O'Kane & Al-Shehbaz

Species
- 8; see text

= Paysonia =

Genus of flowering plants

Paysonia is a genus of flowering plants in the family Brassicaceae. They are generally referred to by the common name bladderpod or mustard. The genus is found in southern North America, ranging from the southeastern and south-central United States to northeastern Mexico. Until 2002 it was considered to be part of the genus Lesquerella but was separated based on genetic and morphological features.

== Species ==
Eight species are accepted.

- Paysonia auriculata (Engelm. & A.Gray) O'Kane & Al-Shehbaz
- Paysonia densipila (Rollins) O'Kane & Al-Shehbaz
- Paysonia grandiflora (Hook.) O'Kane & Al-Shehbaz
- Paysonia lasiocarpa (Hook. ex A.Gray) O'Kane & Al-Shehbaz
- Paysonia lescurii (A.Gray) O'Kane & Al-Shehbaz
- Paysonia lyrata (Rollins) O'Kane & Al-Shehbaz
- Paysonia perforata (Rollins) O'Kane & Al-Shehbaz
- Paysonia stonensis (Rollins) O'Kane & Al-Shehbaz
