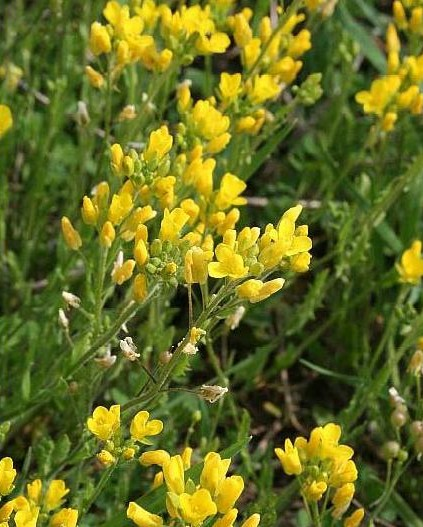

Conservation status
- Critically Imperiled (NatureServe)

Scientific classification
- Kingdom: Plantae
- Clade: Tracheophytes
- Clade: Angiosperms
- Clade: Eudicots
- Clade: Rosids
- Order: Brassicales
- Family: Brassicaceae
- Genus: Paysonia
- Species: P. lyrata

Binomial name
- Paysonia lyrata (Rollins) O'Kane & Al-Shehbaz

Synonyms
- Lesquerella lyrata

= Paysonia lyrata =

Species of flowering plant

Paysonia lyrata is a rare species of flowering plant in the family Brassicaceae known by the common name lyreleaf bladderpod. It is endemic to Alabama in the United States, where it is known from only three occurrences. It is federally listed as a threatened species.

This is an annual herb growing mostly erect to a height of 10 to 30 centimeters. The hairy leaves are up to 7 centimeters in length, the lowest ones largest and sometimes lyrate (lyre-shaped). The flowers have bright yellow petals 5 to 7 millimeters in length.

There is one occurrence in each of three Alabama counties, Colbert, Franklin, and Lawrence Counties. The largest population is in Lawrence County, where thousands of plants grow in a Nature Conservancy preserve. The plant grows in open cedar glades and other open habitat, such as pastures, often with red-colored and limestone-derived soils. The cedar glade is an endangered habitat type that now exists as remnants within stretches of degraded or improperly managed territory. Historically, the glades were maintained naturally as open areas in otherwise brushy woodlands, with disturbances such as wildfire or the activity of bison preventing the succession of woody vegetation into the open areas. The plants are adapted to habitat that is disturbed, so they can sometimes be found growing in artificially disturbed areas such as roadsides, cultivated fields, and pastures grazed by cattle.

There are only a few populations of the plant remaining, and these are persisting in small stretches of land that are no longer part of the original pristine cedar glade ecosystem, or are in cedar glades that are degrading in quality. Only one population is considered to be thriving due to appropriate management.
