= Crataegus cupulifera =

Scientific classification
- Kingdom: Plantae
- Clade: Tracheophytes
- Clade: Angiosperms
- Clade: Eudicots
- Clade: Rosids
- Order: Rosales
- Family: Rosaceae
- Genus: Crataegus
- Species: C. cupulifera

Binomial name
- Crataegus cupulifera Sarg.

Species of hawthorn

Crataegus cupulifera is a hawthorn. The name is considered to be a synonym of C. scabrida var. egglestoni.
