= C. arborea =

C. arborea may refer to:

- Careya arborea, the slow match tree, a tree species found in India
- Cojoba arborea, a tree species found in the Caribbean, Mexico and Central America
- Coriaria arborea, the tutu, a poisonous shrub species native to New Zealand
- Crataegus arborea, the Montgomery hawthorn, a plant species native to the eastern United States in North America

== See also ==
- Arborea (disambiguation)
