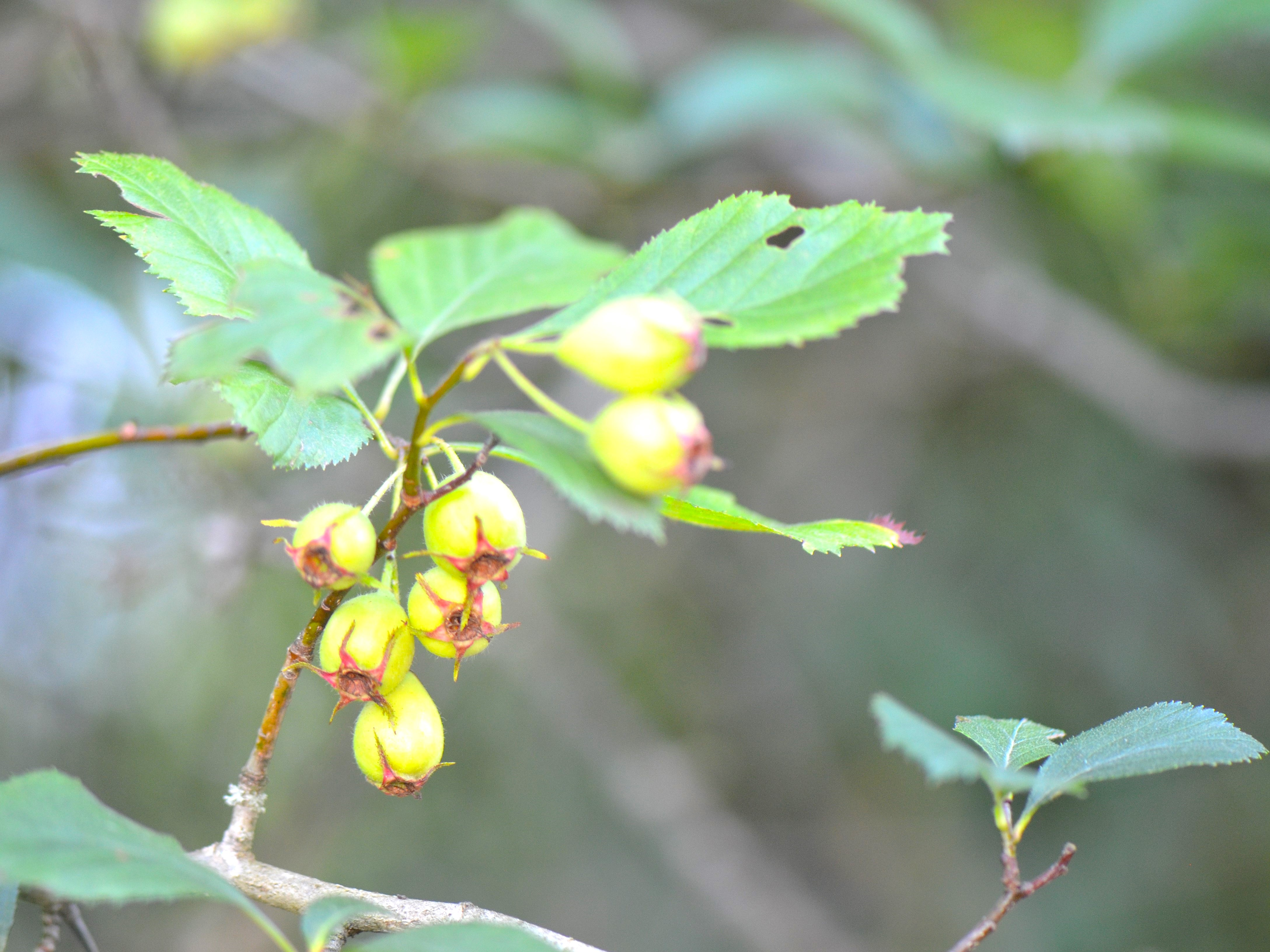
- At the Jardin botanique de Saverne, France

Conservation status
- Critically Endangered (IUCN 3.1)

- Critically Imperiled (NatureServe)

Scientific classification
- Kingdom: Plantae
- Clade: Embryophytes
- Clade: Tracheophytes
- Clade: Spermatophytes
- Clade: Angiosperms
- Clade: Eudicots
- Clade: Rosids
- Order: Rosales
- Family: Rosaceae
- Genus: Crataegus
- Section: Crataegus sect. Coccineae
- Series: Crataegus ser. Bracteatae
- Species: C. harbisonii

Binomial name
- Crataegus harbisonii Beadle

= Crataegus harbisonii =

Species of hawthorn

Crataegus harbisonii is a rare species of hawthorn. Once common in the Nashville area, its population has been reduced significantly in modern times. It is now currently known only from small populations in Davidson and Obion County, Tennessee. This species has been taken into cultivation. It forms a vigorous shrub to 8 m in height with hairy leaves, attractive flowers and round reddish fruit.

It is closely related to Crataegus ashei and Crataegus triflora.

== See also ==
- Thomas Grant Harbison
