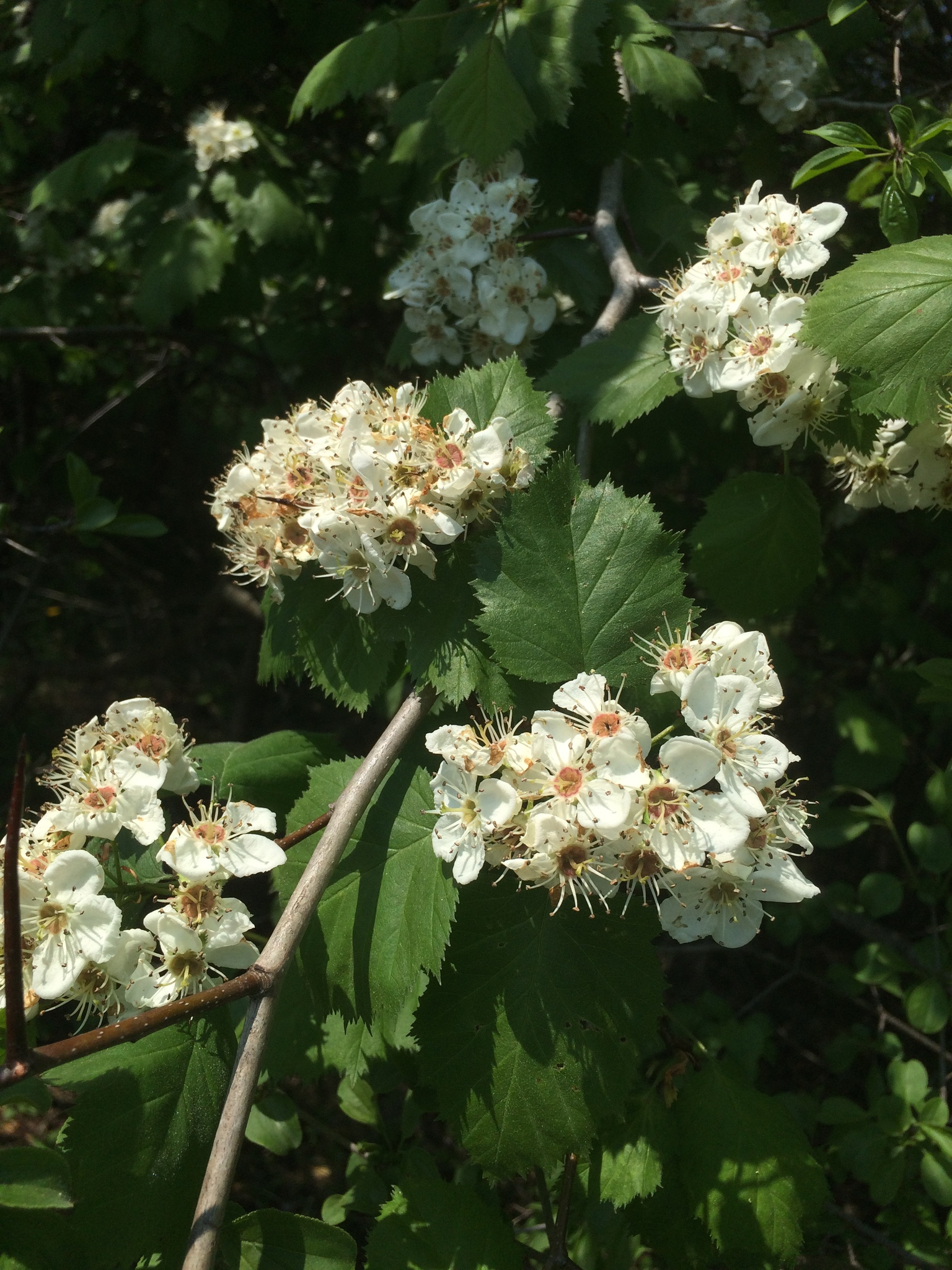
- In Canada

Conservation status
- Least Concern (IUCN 3.1)

Scientific classification
- Kingdom: Plantae
- Clade: Tracheophytes
- Clade: Angiosperms
- Clade: Eudicots
- Clade: Rosids
- Order: Rosales
- Family: Rosaceae
- Genus: Crataegus
- Section: Crataegus sect. Coccineae
- Series: Crataegus ser. Dilatatae
- Species: C. coccinioides

Binomial name
- Crataegus coccinioides Ashe

= Crataegus coccinioides =

Species of hawthorn

Crataegus coccinioides is a species of hawthorn known by the common names Kansas hawthorn and large-flowered cockspurthorn. Crataegus coccinioides is native from Kansas, to New England, and the southernmost parts of Ontario and Quebec. It has large flowers and leaves and fruit that appear pinkish until polished to reveal the red colour underneath the wax bloom. Crataegus coccinioides (or its var. locuples) is a synonym of Crataegus dilatata.
