= Crataegus × smithiana =

Scientific classification
- Kingdom: Plantae
- Clade: Tracheophytes
- Clade: Angiosperms
- Clade: Eudicots
- Clade: Rosids
- Order: Rosales
- Family: Rosaceae
- Genus: Crataegus
- Species: C. × smithiana

Binomial name
- Crataegus × smithiana

Species of hawthorn

Crataegus × smithiana, or perhaps more correctly Crataegus 'Smithiana', is a hybrid hawthorn commonly known as red Mexican hawthorn. The hybrid is said to have originated at the Yarralumla Nursery in Canberra, Australia. This tree has been planted along several streets in Canberra.

== Taxonomy ==
The Latin binomial that is sometimes used, Crataegus × smithiana or the equivalent C. smithiana, appears to have never been validly published under the rules of the International Code of Botanical Nomenclature.
