= Crataegus tracyi =

Conservation status
- Least Concern (IUCN 3.1)

Scientific classification
- Kingdom: Plantae
- Clade: Tracheophytes
- Clade: Angiosperms
- Clade: Eudicots
- Clade: Rosids
- Order: Rosales
- Family: Rosaceae
- Genus: Crataegus
- Section: Crataegus sect. Coccineae
- Series: Crataegus ser. Madrenses
- Species: C. tracyi

Binomial name
- Crataegus tracyi Ashe ex Eggl.
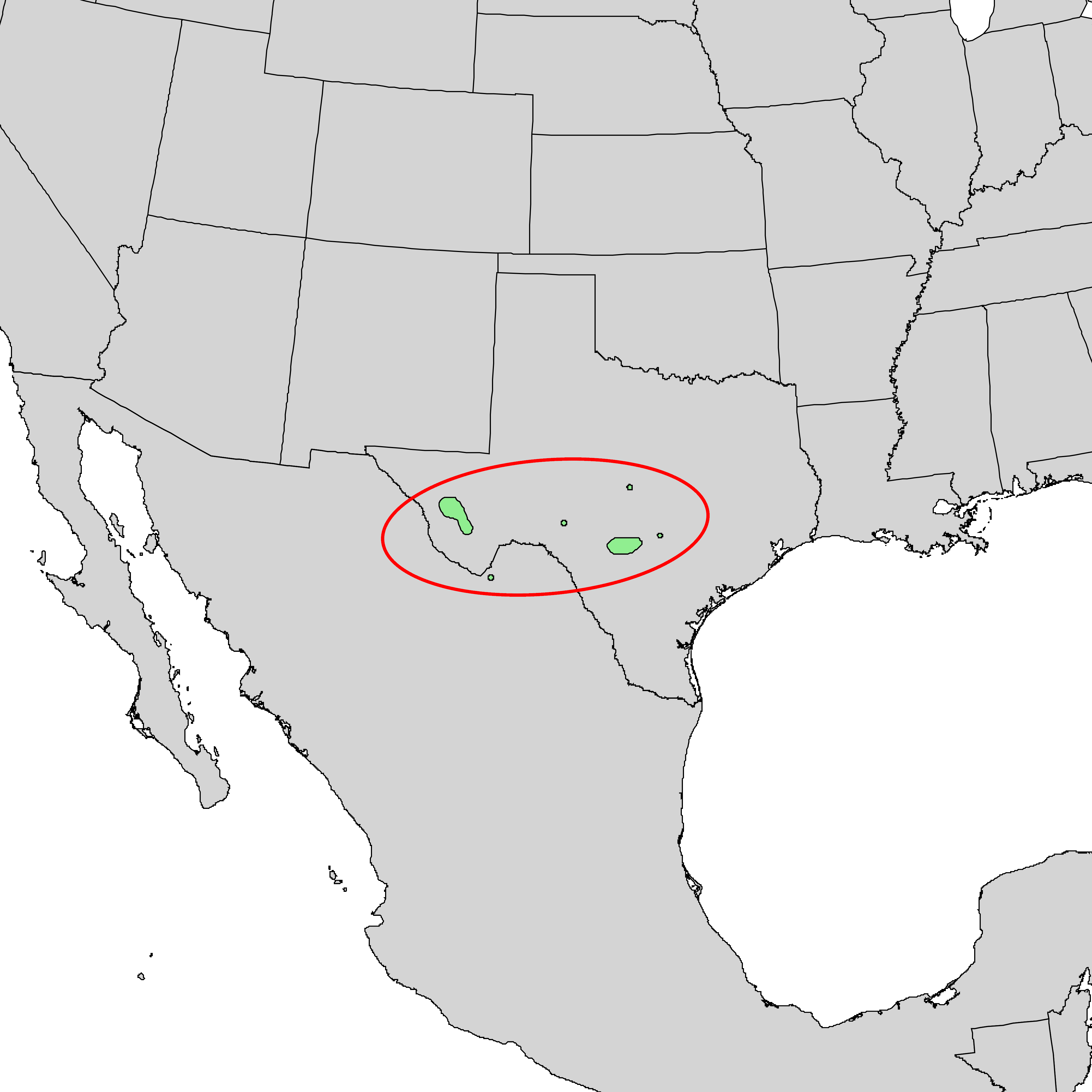
- Natural range of Crataegus tracyi

Species of hawthorn

Crataegus tracyi is a species of hawthorn from Texas and Mexico. It is a shrub to about 6 m in height with white flowers, round red somewhat hairy fruit, and often with red autumn leaves. It is quite variable in appearance. It is rarely cultivated but has the potential to become a valuable ornamental plant.
