= Crataegus reverchonii =

Conservation status
- Least Concern (IUCN 3.1)

Scientific classification
- Kingdom: Plantae
- Clade: Tracheophytes
- Clade: Angiosperms
- Clade: Eudicots
- Clade: Rosids
- Order: Rosales
- Family: Rosaceae
- Genus: Crataegus
- Species: C. reverchonii

Binomial name
- Crataegus reverchonii Sarg.

Texan species of hawthorn

Crataegus reverchonii is a species of hawthorn known as Reverchon hawthorn, native to the Southwestern United States (Texas and Oklahoma).
