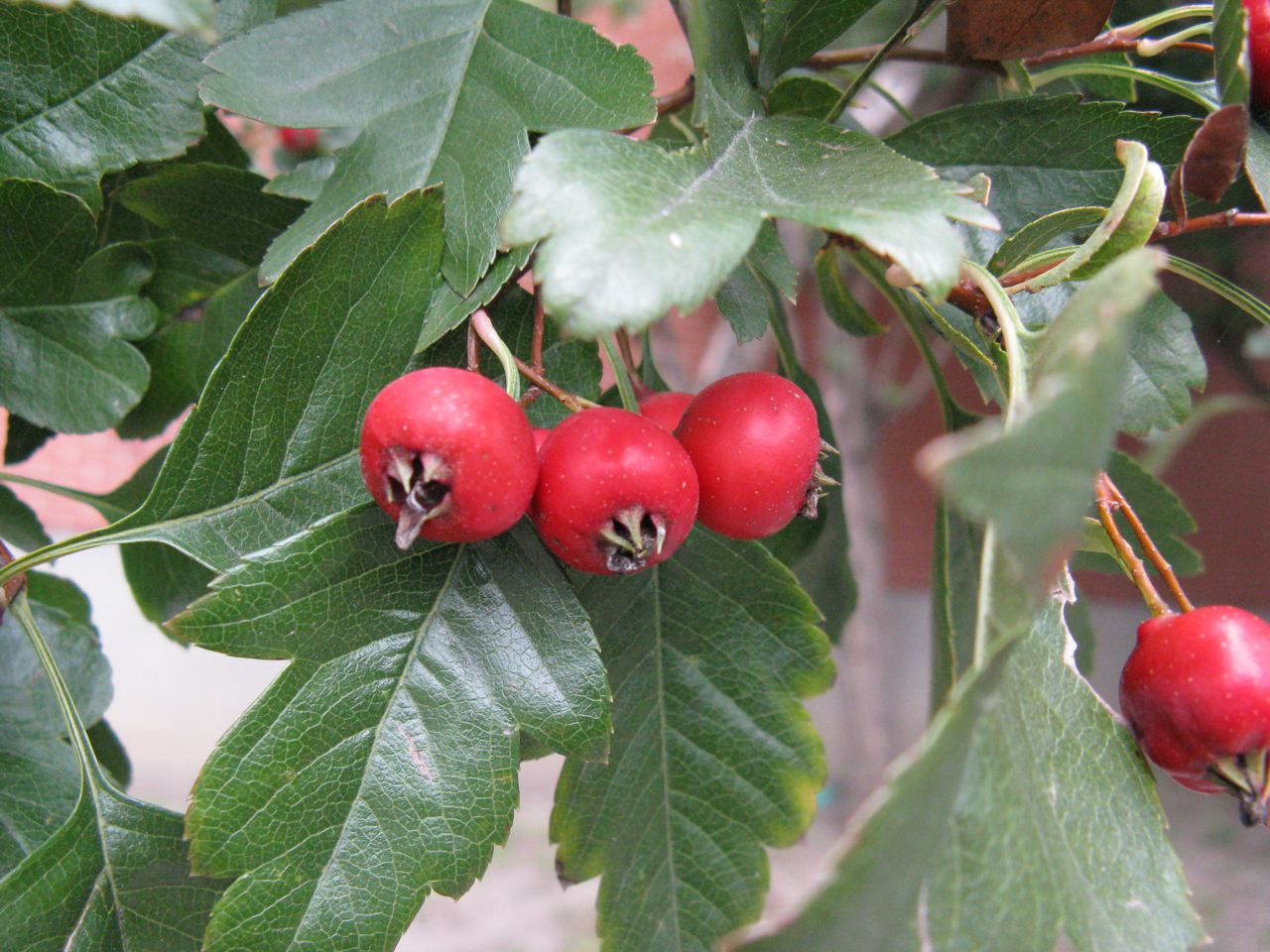

Scientific classification
- Kingdom: Plantae
- Clade: Tracheophytes
- Clade: Angiosperms
- Clade: Eudicots
- Clade: Rosids
- Order: Rosales
- Family: Rosaceae
- Genus: Crataegus
- Species: C. × mordenensis

Binomial name
- Crataegus × mordenensis Boom

= Crataegus × mordenensis =

Species of hawthorn

Crataegus × mordenensis, the Morden hawthorn, is a hybrid that arose between two species in the genus Crataegus (hawthorn), Crataegus laevigata and Crataegus succulenta. This hybrid was first raised at the Agriculture Canada Plant Breeding Station in Morden, Manitoba, in 1935.

Two cultivars of this hybrid are significant in horticulture: 'Toba', with white double flowers that age to pink, and 'Snowbird' with white double flowers.

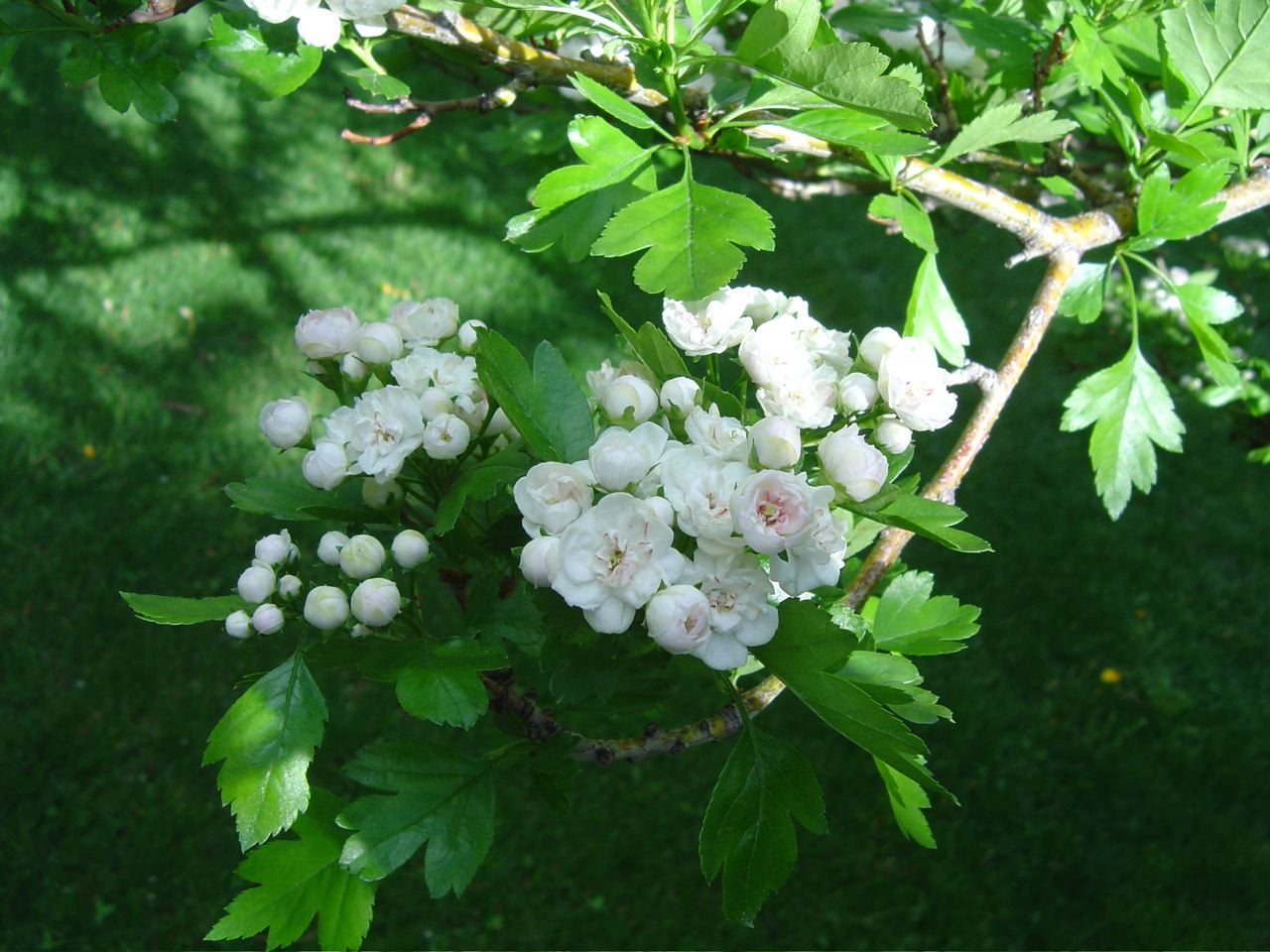
Crataegus × mordenensis 'Toba', young flowers.

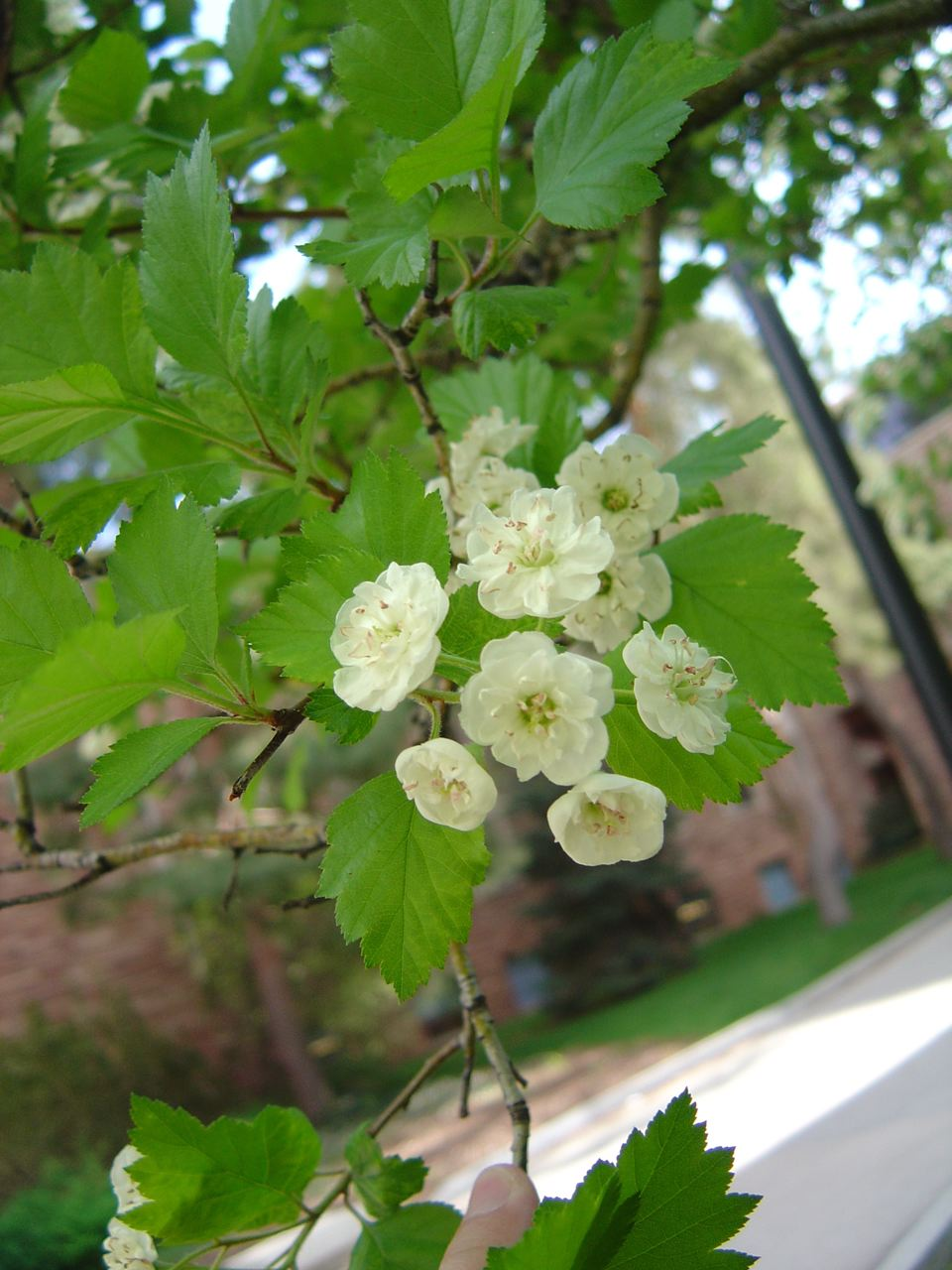
Crataegus × mordenensis 'Snowbird'
