= Crataegus collina =

Conservation status
- Least Concern (IUCN 3.1)

Scientific classification
- Kingdom: Plantae
- Clade: Tracheophytes
- Clade: Angiosperms
- Clade: Eudicots
- Clade: Rosids
- Order: Rosales
- Family: Rosaceae
- Genus: Crataegus
- Section: Crataegus sect. Coccineae
- Series: Crataegus ser. Punctatae
- Species: C. collina

Binomial name
- Crataegus collina Chapm.

Species of hawthorn

Crataegus collina is a type of hawthorn that is closely related to C. punctata, the dotted hawthorn, and sometimes considered to be the same species. A sample of C. collina and C. punctata has suggested that C. collina is polyploid, and C. punctata is diploid, but a wider sample is needed to confirm that this is generally the case.
