= Crataegus ater =

Scientific classification
- Kingdom: Plantae
- Clade: Tracheophytes
- Clade: Angiosperms
- Clade: Eudicots
- Clade: Rosids
- Order: Rosales
- Family: Rosaceae
- Genus: Crataegus
- Species: C. ater

Binomial name
- Crataegus ater Ashe

Species of hawthorn

Crataegus ater, known as the Nashville hawthorn, is a species of hawthorn that grows as a shrub or tree, native to the Great Lakes region of North America.

== Distribution ==
The native range of Crataegus ater includes Michigan, Ohio in the U.S., and Ontario in Canada.
