= Crataegus × ariifolia =

Scientific classification
- Kingdom: Plantae
- Clade: Tracheophytes
- Clade: Angiosperms
- Clade: Eudicots
- Clade: Rosids
- Order: Rosales
- Family: Rosaceae
- Genus: Crataegus
- Species: C. × ariifolia

Binomial name
- Crataegus × ariifolia Cinovskis

Synonyms
- C. sorbifolia Lange

Species of hawthorn

Crataegus × ariifolia is an ornamental hybrid hawthorn that is used in horticulture. Its name refers to a similarity of its leaves to the genus Aria (Sorbus aria).

== Taxonomy ==
The name of this hybrid was originally spelled C. ariaefolia, but this should always be corrected to C. ariifolia according to article 60.8 of the International Code of Botanical Nomenclature. One of the parents of the hybrid was given as C. oxyacantha (an invalid name), which probably means C. laevigata.
