= Crataegus jackii =

Scientific classification
- Kingdom: Plantae
- Clade: Tracheophytes
- Clade: Angiosperms
- Clade: Eudicots
- Clade: Rosids
- Order: Rosales
- Family: Rosaceae
- Genus: Crataegus
- Section: Crataegus sect. Coccineae
- Series: Crataegus ser. Rotundifoliae
- Species: C. jackii

Binomial name
- Crataegus jackii Sarg.

Species of hawthorn

Crataegus jackii is a hawthorn that is restricted to southern Quebec. It is related to and has been considered to be a synonym of C. chrysocarpa, but is very hairy, with larger flowers, and has been made a synonym of C. lumaria Ashe.
