= Crataegus okanaganensis =

Scientific classification
- Kingdom: Plantae
- Clade: Tracheophytes
- Clade: Angiosperms
- Clade: Eudicots
- Clade: Rosids
- Order: Rosales
- Family: Rosaceae
- Tribe: Maleae
- Subtribe: Malinae
- Genus: Crataegus
- Species: C. okanaganensis

Binomial name
- Crataegus okanaganensis J.B.Phipps & O'Kennon

Species of hawthorn

Crataegus okanaganensis is a species of hawthorn native to western British Columbia, Washington state and Montana. It forms a vigorous shrub to 8 m in height with brilliant red fruit in late summer, that later ripen to "burgundy to deep purple (occasionally almost black)". It has potential as an ornamental plant.
