= Crataegus pulcherrima =

Conservation status
- Least Concern (IUCN 3.1)

Scientific classification
- Kingdom: Plantae
- Clade: Tracheophytes
- Clade: Angiosperms
- Clade: Eudicots
- Clade: Rosids
- Order: Rosales
- Family: Rosaceae
- Genus: Crataegus
- Section: Crataegus sect. Coccineae
- Series: Crataegus ser. Pulcherrimae
- Species: C. pulcherrima

Binomial name
- Crataegus pulcherrima Ashe
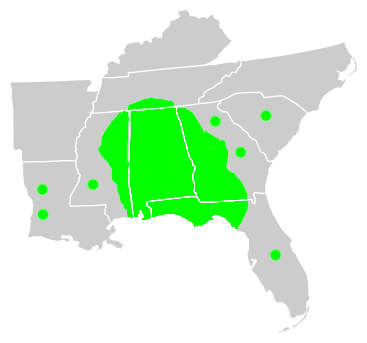
- Natural range of C. pulcherrima

Species of hawthorn

Crataegus pulcherrima is a species of Hawthorn native to the southeastern United States. This species and those related to it that are classified in Crataegus series Pulcherrimae have been largely ignored since they were originally described in 1903, but warrant consideration as ornamental cultivated plants.

== Description ==
Crataegus pulcherrima is a shrub or small tree up to about 8 m tall. The leaves are simple and alternately arranged, and have serrated margins with 2-4 lobes. The upper leaf surface is dull green and glabrous. Flowers are white, tinged with pink, 15-25 mm in diameter, appearing mid- to late spring. The fruit is a bright red, 7-14 mm pome, ripening in early autumn, persisting into mid- autumn.

== Distribution ==
Crataegus pulcherrima is native from eastern Mississippi east to Alabama and western Georgia, north to south-central Tennessee and south to the Florida Panhandle. It has been reported in Louisiana and South Carolina. Crataegus pulcherrima occurs naturally in mixed upland hardwood and pine forests, often in rich, sandy soils.
