= Crataegus heldreichii =

Conservation status
- Least Concern (IUCN 3.1)

Scientific classification
- Kingdom: Plantae
- Clade: Tracheophytes
- Clade: Angiosperms
- Clade: Eudicots
- Clade: Rosids
- Order: Rosales
- Family: Rosaceae
- Genus: Crataegus
- Species: C. heldreichii

Binomial name
- Crataegus heldreichii Boiss.

Synonyms
- Crataegus tanacetifolia var. heldreichii (Boiss.) Regel

Species of plant in the rose family

Crataegus heldreichii is a species of flowering plant in the family Rosaceae. It is a hawthorn with red fruit that is native to Albania, Bulgaria, Greece and Yugoslavia.
