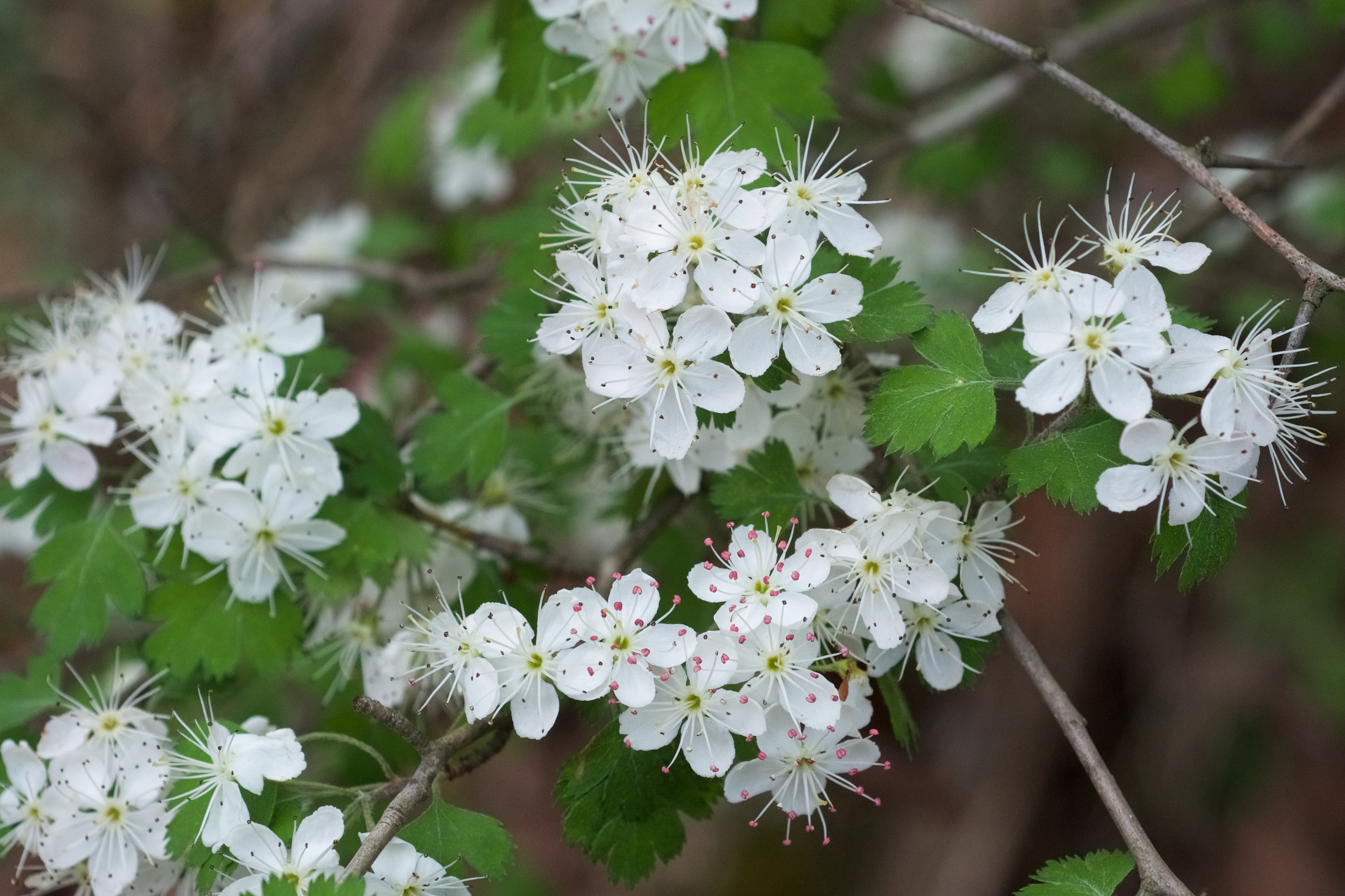

Conservation status
- Least Concern (IUCN 3.1)

- Secure (NatureServe)

Scientific classification
- Kingdom: Plantae
- Clade: Tracheophytes
- Clade: Angiosperms
- Clade: Eudicots
- Clade: Rosids
- Order: Rosales
- Family: Rosaceae
- Genus: Crataegus
- Species: C. marshallii

Binomial name
- Crataegus marshallii Eggl.

Synonyms
- C. apiifolia (Marshall) Michx. nom. illeg.

= Crataegus marshallii =

Species of hawthorn

Crataegus marshallii is a species of hawthorn known by the common name parsley hawthorn. It is native to the southeastern United States.

The leaves of C. marshallii are finely dissected and decorative. The dainty flowers, small red fruit, and beautiful bark add to the ornamental value of this species.

In 1803, Michaux published the name Crataegus apiifolia for this American species, but that name is considered illegitimate.

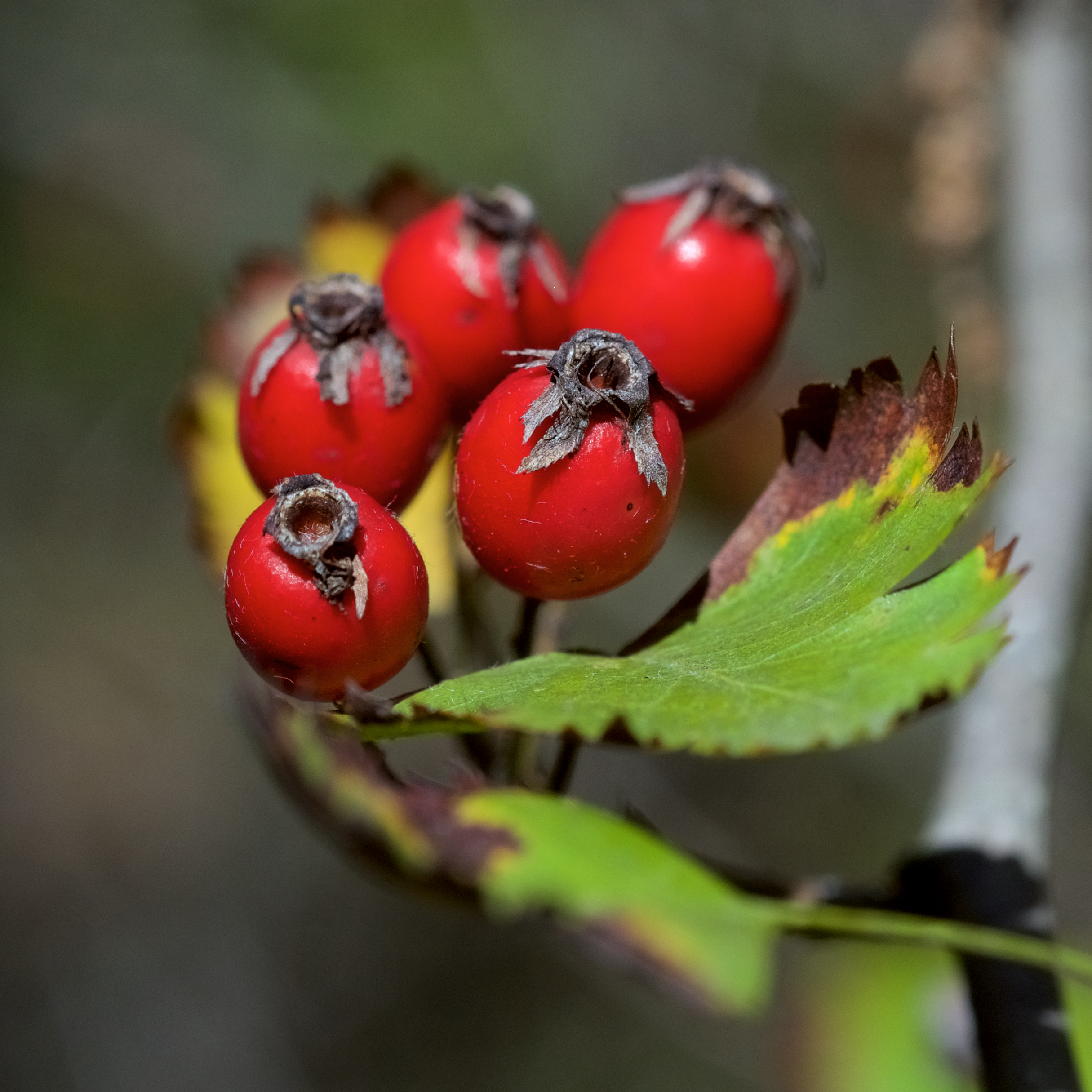
Fruit of Crataegus marshallii
