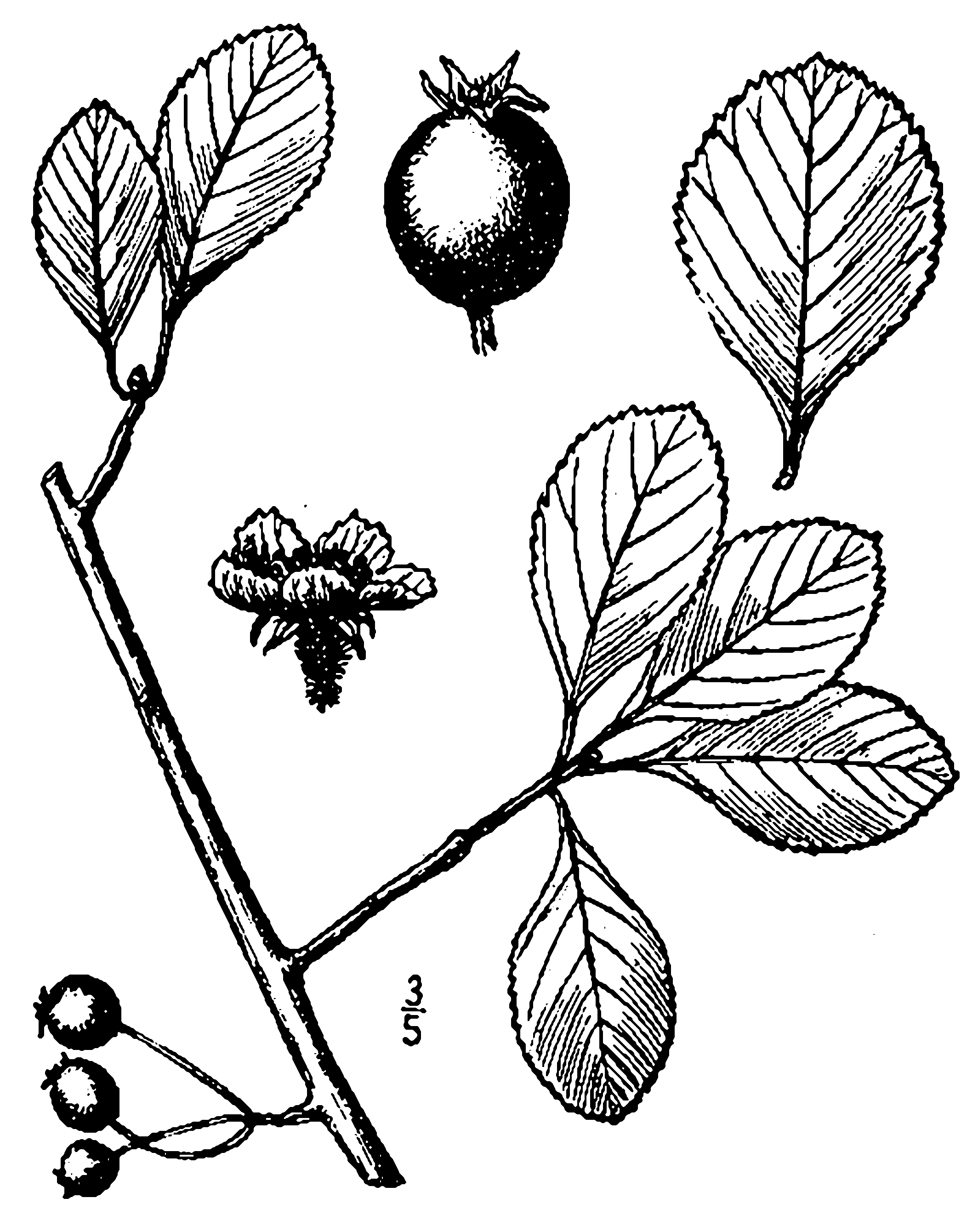

Conservation status
- Least Concern (IUCN 3.1)

Scientific classification
- Kingdom: Plantae
- Clade: Tracheophytes
- Clade: Angiosperms
- Clade: Eudicots
- Clade: Rosids
- Order: Rosales
- Family: Rosaceae
- Genus: Crataegus
- Section: Crataegus sect. Coccineae
- Series: Crataegus ser. Crus-galli
- Species: C. berberifolia

Binomial name
- Crataegus berberifolia Torr. & A.Gray

= Crataegus berberifolia =

Species of hawthorn

Crataegus berberifolia, the barberry hawthorn, is a species of hawthorn from the southeastern United States. There are two varieties: C. berberifolia var. berberifolia has 20 stamens with cream-coloured anthers, and C. berberifolia var. engelmanii has 10 stamens with purplish pink anthers.
