= Crataegus ambitiosa =

Scientific classification
- Kingdom: Plantae
- Clade: Tracheophytes
- Clade: Angiosperms
- Clade: Eudicots
- Clade: Rosids
- Order: Rosales
- Family: Rosaceae
- Genus: Crataegus
- Species: C. ambitiosa

Binomial name
- Crataegus ambitiosa Sarg.

Species of hawthorn

Crataegus ambitiosa, the Grand Rapids hawthorn, is a species of hawthorn endemic to Michigan, in the Great Lakes region of North America. It has been placed in series Silvicolae. It can grow up to 20 feet (6.1 metres) tall.
