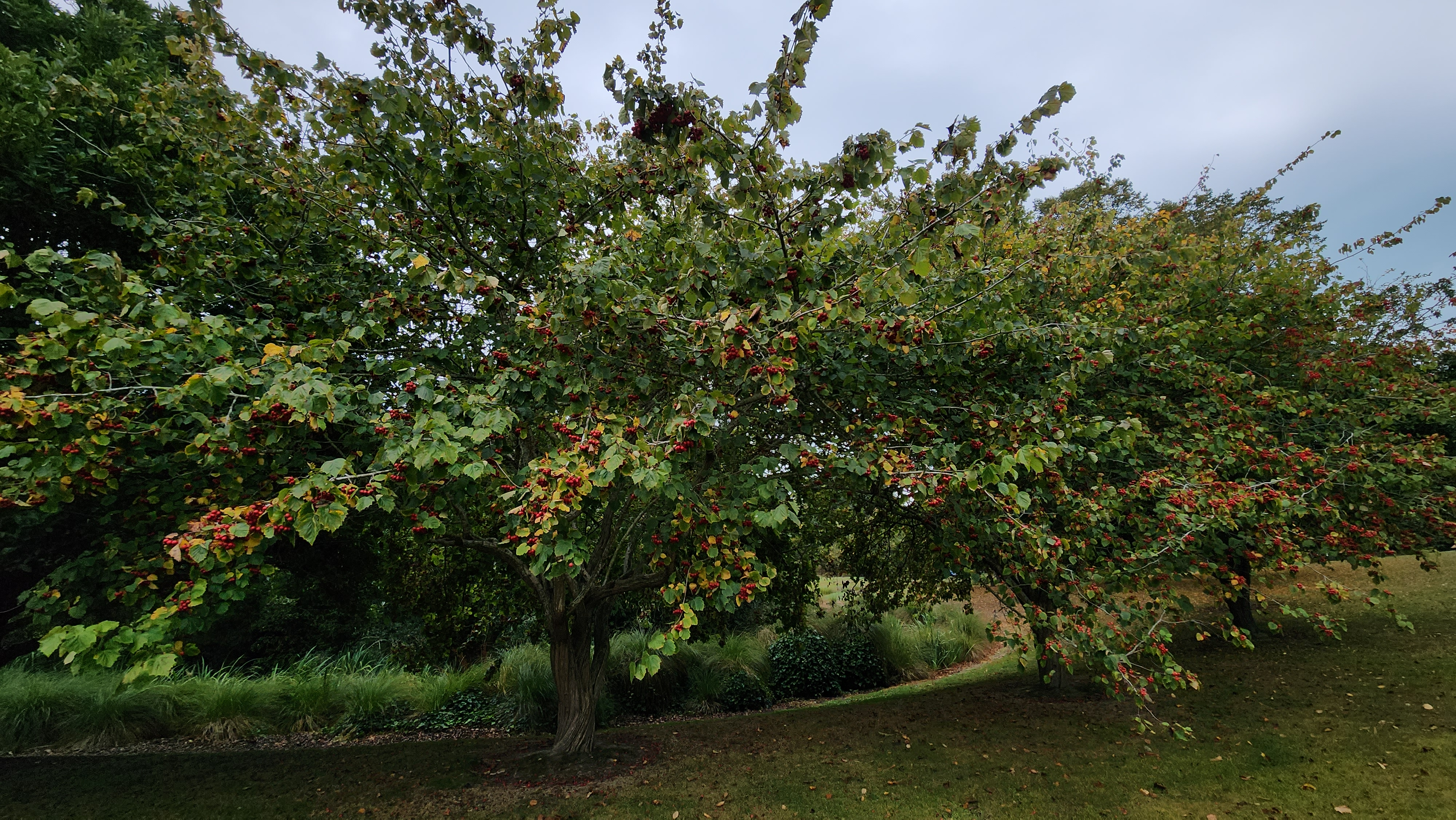

Scientific classification
- Kingdom: Plantae
- Clade: Tracheophytes
- Clade: Angiosperms
- Clade: Eudicots
- Clade: Rosids
- Order: Rosales
- Family: Rosaceae
- Genus: Crataegus
- Species: C. ancisa

Binomial name
- Crataegus ancisa Beadle

= Crataegus ancisa =

Species of hawthorn

Crataegus ancisa, the Mississippi hawthorn, is a species of hawthorn that grows as a shrub or tree, and is endemic to the Southern United States, in North America. It can grow up to 15 feet (4.6 metres) tall.

== Distribution ==
Crataegus ancisa is found in Mississippi and Alabama.
