= Crataegus annosa =

Scientific classification
- Kingdom: Plantae
- Clade: Tracheophytes
- Clade: Angiosperms
- Clade: Eudicots
- Clade: Rosids
- Order: Rosales
- Family: Rosaceae
- Genus: Crataegus
- Species: C. annosa

Binomial name
- Crataegus annosa Beadle

Species of hawthorn

Crataegus annosa is a poorly known species of hawthorn that is endemic to Alabama, and first recorded from Russell County there, in the Southern United States of North America. It can grow up to 25 feet (7.6 metres) tall.

== Taxonomy ==
In some respects it resembles Crataegus series Apricae, while in other respects it resembles series Lacrimatae.
