= Crataegus sargentii =

Conservation status
- Least Concern (IUCN 3.1)

Scientific classification
- Kingdom: Plantae
- Clade: Tracheophytes
- Clade: Angiosperms
- Clade: Eudicots
- Clade: Rosids
- Order: Rosales
- Family: Rosaceae
- Genus: Crataegus
- Section: Crataegus sect. Coccineae
- Series: Crataegus ser. Pulcherrimae
- Species: C. sargentii

Binomial name
- Crataegus sargentii Beadle

Species of hawthorn

Crataegus sargentii is a species of hawthorn from the southeastern United States, commonly called Sargent's hawthorn. It is a shrub to about 5 m in height with white flowers, and fruit up to about 1 cm in diameter that are yellow or yellow flushed with pink or red.
