= Crataegus pratensis =

Scientific classification
- Kingdom: Plantae
- Clade: Tracheophytes
- Clade: Angiosperms
- Clade: Eudicots
- Clade: Rosids
- Order: Rosales
- Family: Rosaceae
- Genus: Crataegus
- Section: Crataegus sect. Crataegus
- Series: Crataegus ser. Crataegus
- Species: C. pratensis

Binomial name
- Crataegus pratensis Sarg.

Species of hawthorn

Crataegus pratensis is a species of hawthorn known by the common name prairie hawthorn.
