= Crataegus arcana =

Scientific classification
- Kingdom: Plantae
- Clade: Tracheophytes
- Clade: Angiosperms
- Clade: Eudicots
- Clade: Rosids
- Order: Rosales
- Family: Rosaceae
- Genus: Crataegus
- Species: C. arcana

Binomial name
- Crataegus arcana Beadle 1902

Species of hawthorn

Crataegus arcana, the Carolina Hawthorn, is a rare and poorly known species of hawthorn in the rose family. It grows as a shrub or tree and is endemic to the eastern United States in North America. It is thought to be allied with series Pruinosae.

== Distribution ==
Crataegus arcana is found in Michigan, New York, North Carolina, and West Virginia.
