= Crataegus hupehensis =

Conservation status
- Least Concern (IUCN 3.1)

Scientific classification
- Kingdom: Plantae
- Clade: Tracheophytes
- Clade: Angiosperms
- Clade: Eudicots
- Clade: Rosids
- Order: Rosales
- Family: Rosaceae
- Genus: Crataegus
- Species: C. hupehensis

Binomial name
- Crataegus hupehensis Sarg.

Species of hawthorn

Crataegus hupehensis is an Asian species of hawthorn that can grow to be a substantial tree. It is similar to C. pinnatifida var. major, but with less pronounced lobes on the leaves.
