= Crataegus mercerensis =

Scientific classification
- Kingdom: Plantae
- Clade: Tracheophytes
- Clade: Angiosperms
- Clade: Eudicots
- Clade: Rosids
- Order: Rosales
- Family: Rosaceae
- Genus: Crataegus
- Section: Crataegus sect. Coccineae
- Series: Crataegus ser. Rotundifoliae
- Species: C. mercerensis

Binomial name
- Crataegus mercerensis Sarg.

Species of hawthorn

Crataegus mercerensis is a hawthorn that is considered to be a synonym of either C. chrysocarpa or of C. dodgei.
