= Crataegus anamesa =

Scientific classification
- Kingdom: Plantae
- Clade: Tracheophytes
- Clade: Angiosperms
- Clade: Eudicots
- Clade: Rosids
- Order: Rosales
- Family: Rosaceae
- Genus: Crataegus
- Section: Crataegus sect. Coccineae
- Series: Crataegus ser. Virides
- Species: C. anamesa

Binomial name
- Crataegus anamesa Sarg.
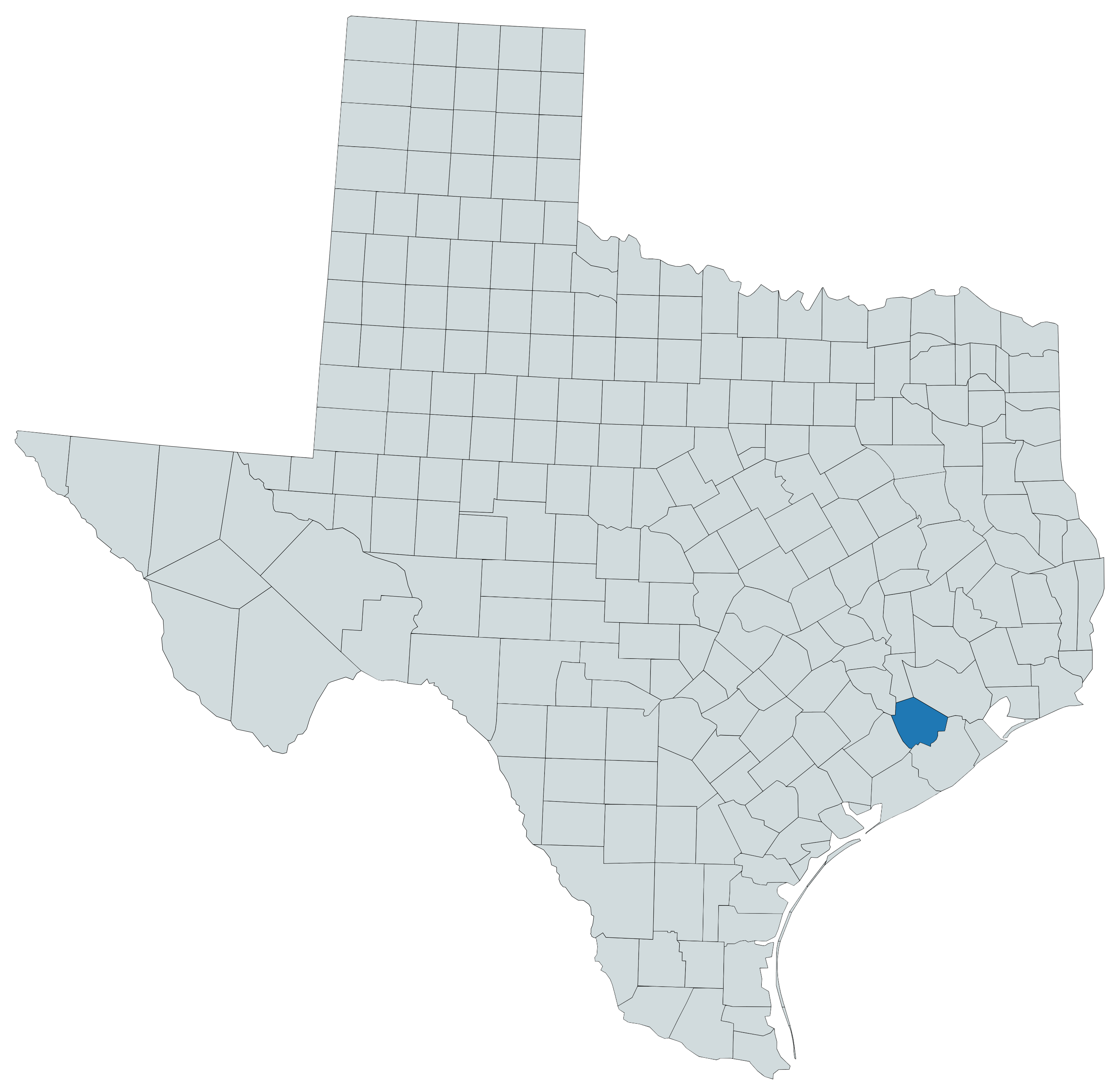
- Range of Crataegus anamesa

Species of hawthorn

Crataegus anamesa, the Fort Bend hawthorn, is a species of hawthorn that is endemic to Fort Bend County, Texas, in North America. When mature, it stands 12-15' in height and produces dark red fruit 1/3-2/5" in diameter.
