= Crataegus kansuensis =

Conservation status
- Least Concern (IUCN 3.1)

Scientific classification
- Kingdom: Plantae
- Clade: Tracheophytes
- Clade: Angiosperms
- Clade: Eudicots
- Clade: Rosids
- Order: Rosales
- Family: Rosaceae
- Subtribe: Malinae
- Genus: Crataegus
- Species: C. kansuensis

Binomial name
- Crataegus kansuensis E.H.Wilson

Species of flowering plant

Crataegus kansuensis, the Gansu hawthorn (Chinese: 甘肃山楂), is a species of hawthorn found in China. They are shrubs or small trees, often very thorny. They prefer to grow in mixed forests, on shaded slopes and alongside streams, 1,000 to 3,000 m (3,300 to 9,800 ft) above sea level.
