= Crataegus fontanesiana =

Scientific classification
- Kingdom: Plantae
- Clade: Tracheophytes
- Clade: Angiosperms
- Clade: Eudicots
- Clade: Rosids
- Order: Rosales
- Family: Rosaceae
- Genus: Crataegus
- Section: Crataegus sect. Coccineae
- Series: Crataegus ser. Macracanthae
- Species: C. fontanesiana

Binomial name
- Crataegus fontanesiana Steud.

Species of hawthorn

J.B. Phipps has shown that Crataegus fontanesiana are "somewhat narrow-leaved forms of C. calpodendron". The name was mis-applied for much of the 19th and 20th centuries to some forms of C. crus-galli.
