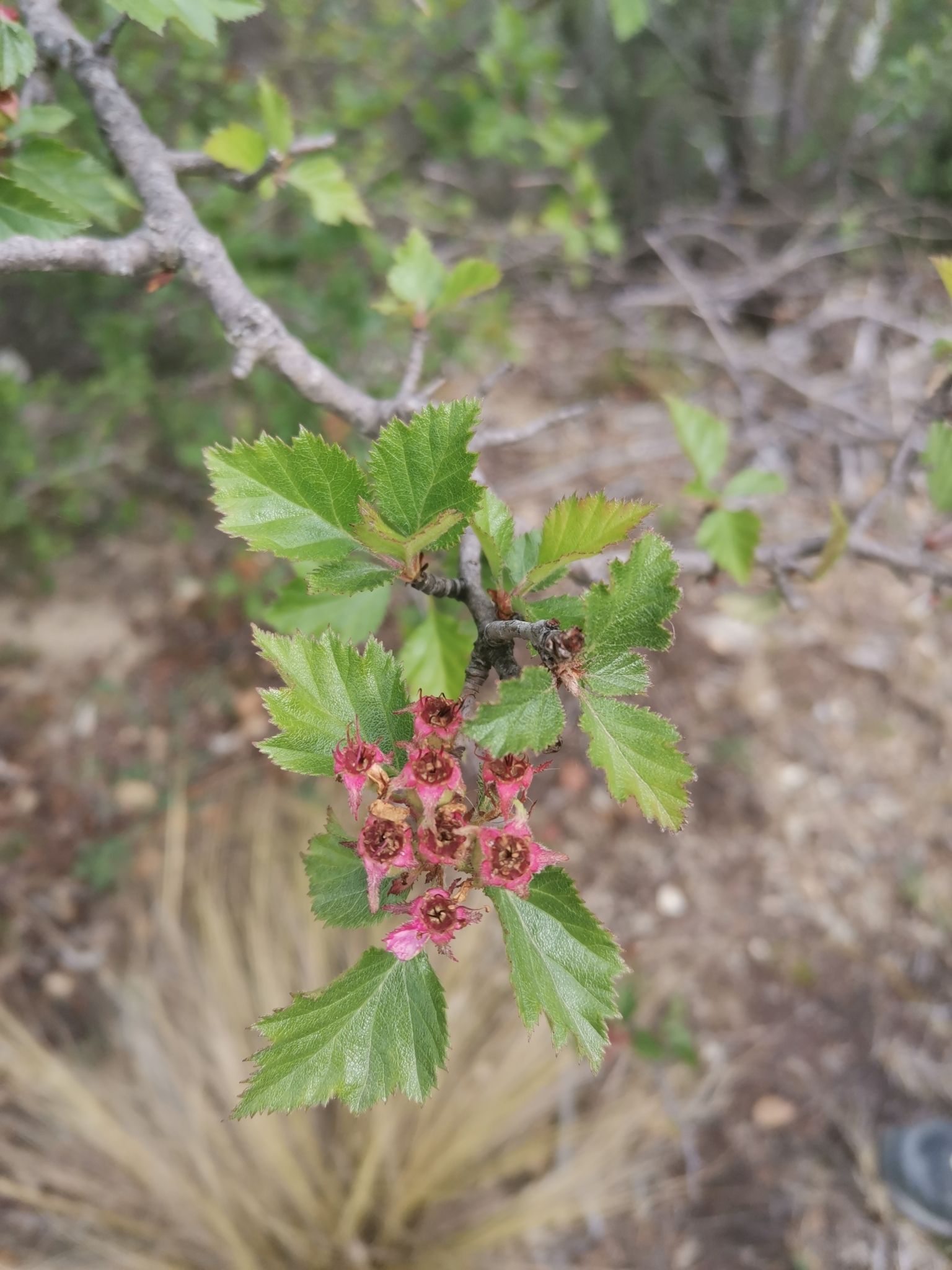

Scientific classification
- Kingdom: Plantae
- Clade: Tracheophytes
- Clade: Angiosperms
- Clade: Eudicots
- Clade: Rosids
- Order: Rosales
- Family: Rosaceae
- Genus: Crataegus
- Species: C. greggiana

Binomial name
- Crataegus greggiana Eggl.

Synonyms
- Crataegus greggiana var. pepo J.B.Phipps; Crataegus uvaldensis Sarg.

= Crataegus greggiana =

Species of plant

Crataegus greggiana, the Gregg hawthorn or Gregg's hawthorn, is a species of hawthorn that is used for food.

It is native to the Edwards Plateau of Texas and the states of Coahuila and Nuevo León in Mexico.
