= Crataegus wilsonii =

Scientific classification
- Kingdom: Plantae
- Clade: Tracheophytes
- Clade: Angiosperms
- Clade: Eudicots
- Clade: Rosids
- Order: Rosales
- Family: Rosaceae
- Genus: Crataegus
- Section: Crataegus sect. Sanguineae
- Series: Crataegus ser. Sanguineae
- Species: C. wilsonii

Binomial name
- Crataegus wilsonii Sarg.

Species of hawthorn

Crataegus wilsonii is a species of hawthorn native to the mountains of southwestern China at elevations of 900 to 3000 meters. It is an ornamental tree, intolerant of summer drought, that is rarely cultivated.
