= Crataegus vulsa =

Scientific classification
- Kingdom: Plantae
- Clade: Tracheophytes
- Clade: Angiosperms
- Clade: Eudicots
- Clade: Rosids
- Order: Rosales
- Family: Rosaceae
- Genus: Crataegus
- Species: C. vulsa

Binomial name
- Crataegus vulsa Beadle

Species of hawthorn

Crataegus vulsa, the Alabama hawthorn, is a rare species of hawthorn from northeastern Alabama and northwestern Georgia.
