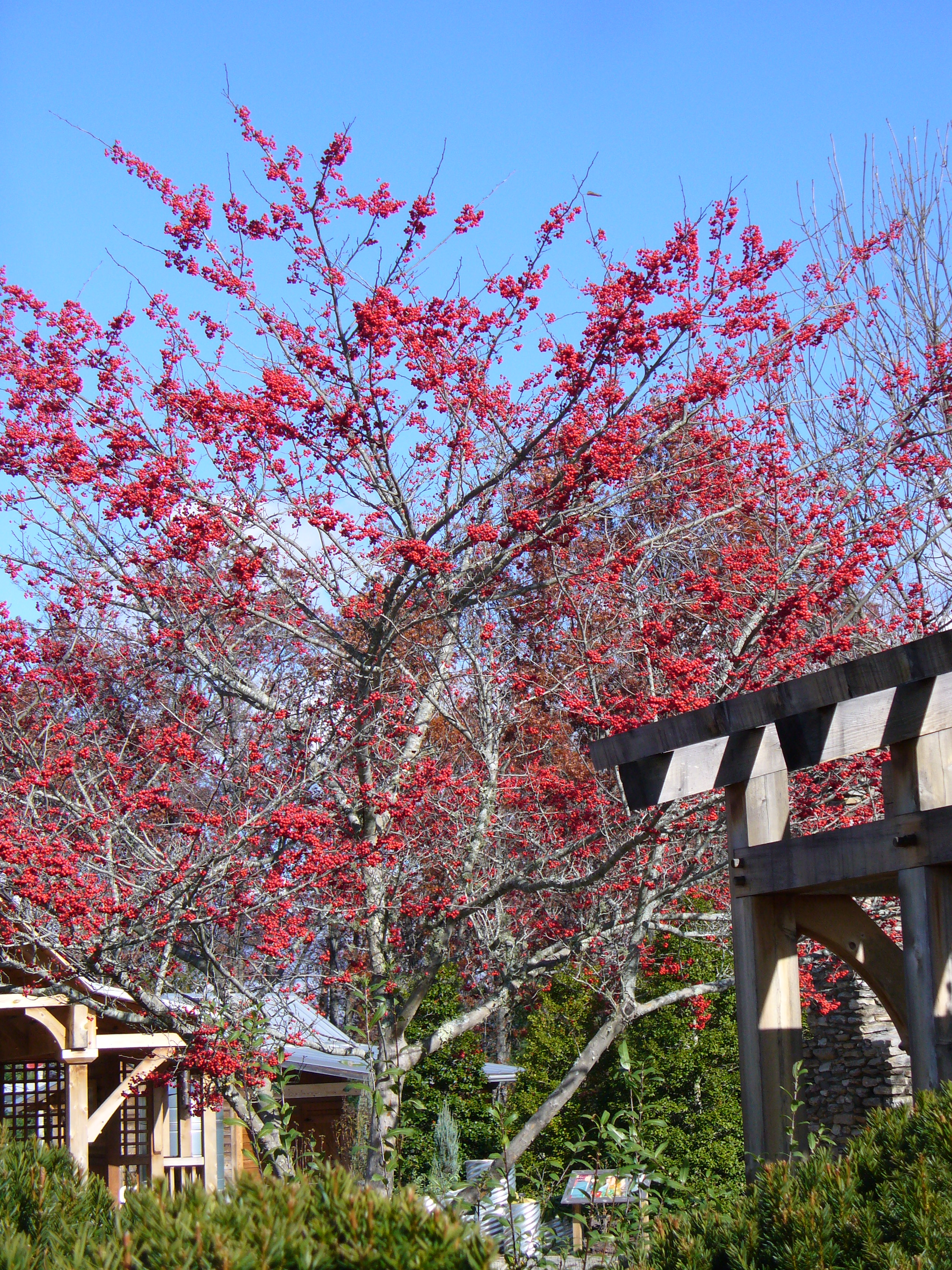
- 'Winter King' cultivar

Conservation status
- Least Concern (IUCN 3.1)

Scientific classification
- Kingdom: Plantae
- Clade: Tracheophytes
- Clade: Angiosperms
- Clade: Eudicots
- Clade: Rosids
- Order: Rosales
- Family: Rosaceae
- Genus: Crataegus
- Section: Crataegus sect. Coccineae
- Series: Crataegus ser. Virides
- Species: C. viridis

Binomial name
- Crataegus viridis L.

= Crataegus viridis =

Species of plant

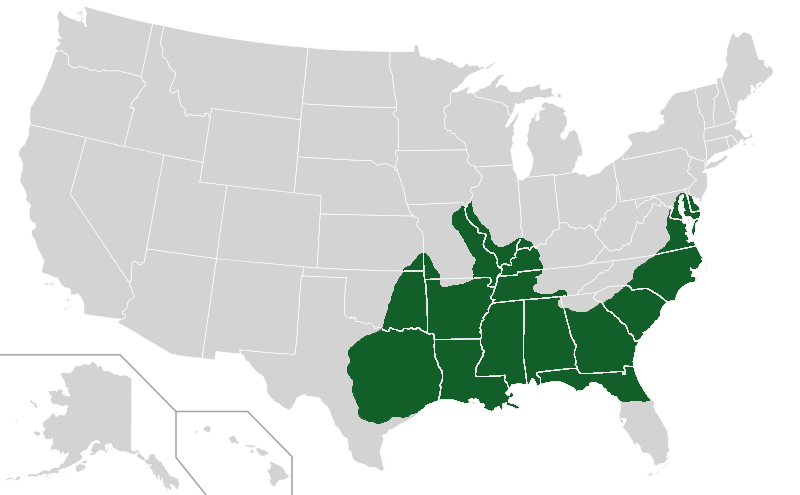
Native range

Crataegus viridis, the green hawthorn or southern thorn, is a species of hawthorn that is native to the southeastern United States. The tree tends to grow to be 5–15 meters tall. Forms vary considerably, and many desirable ornamental forms could be selected from the wild. The cultivar 'Winter King' is a well-known selection.

== Gallery ==
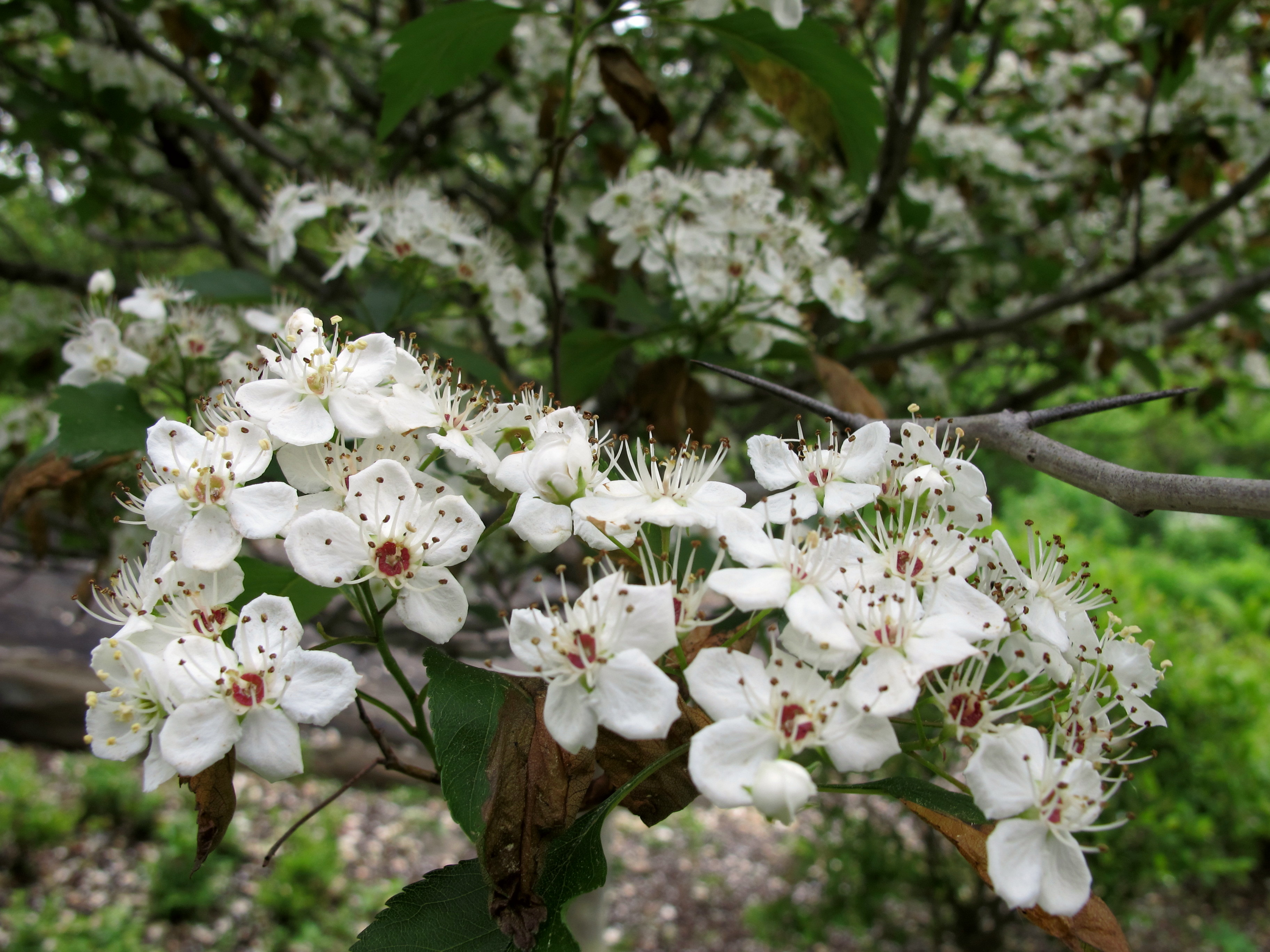

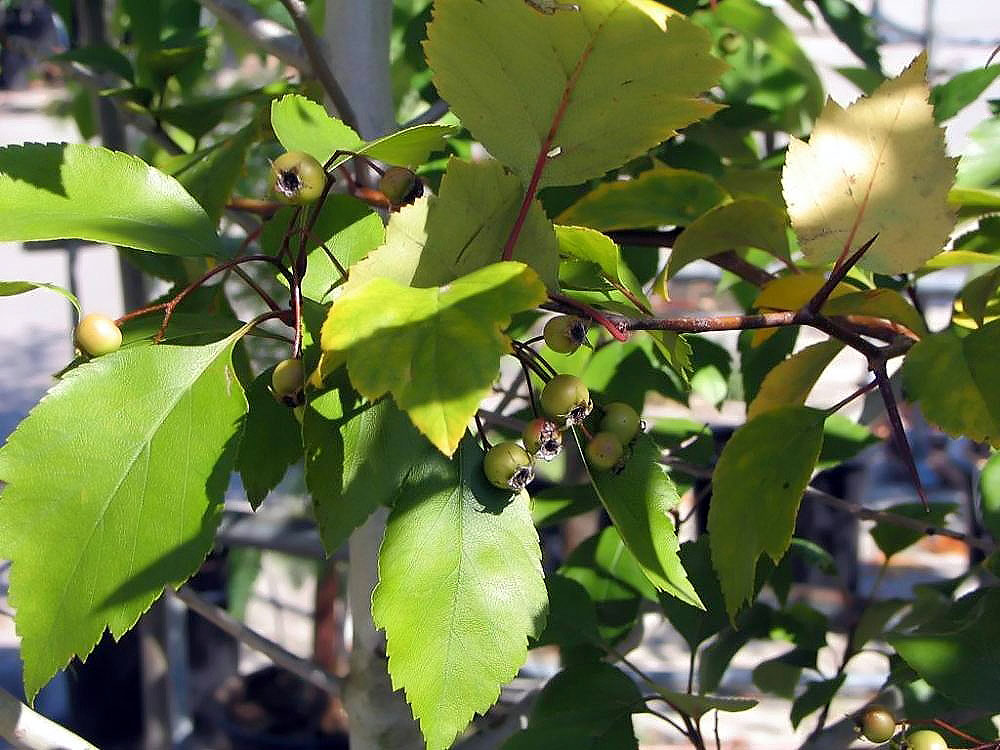

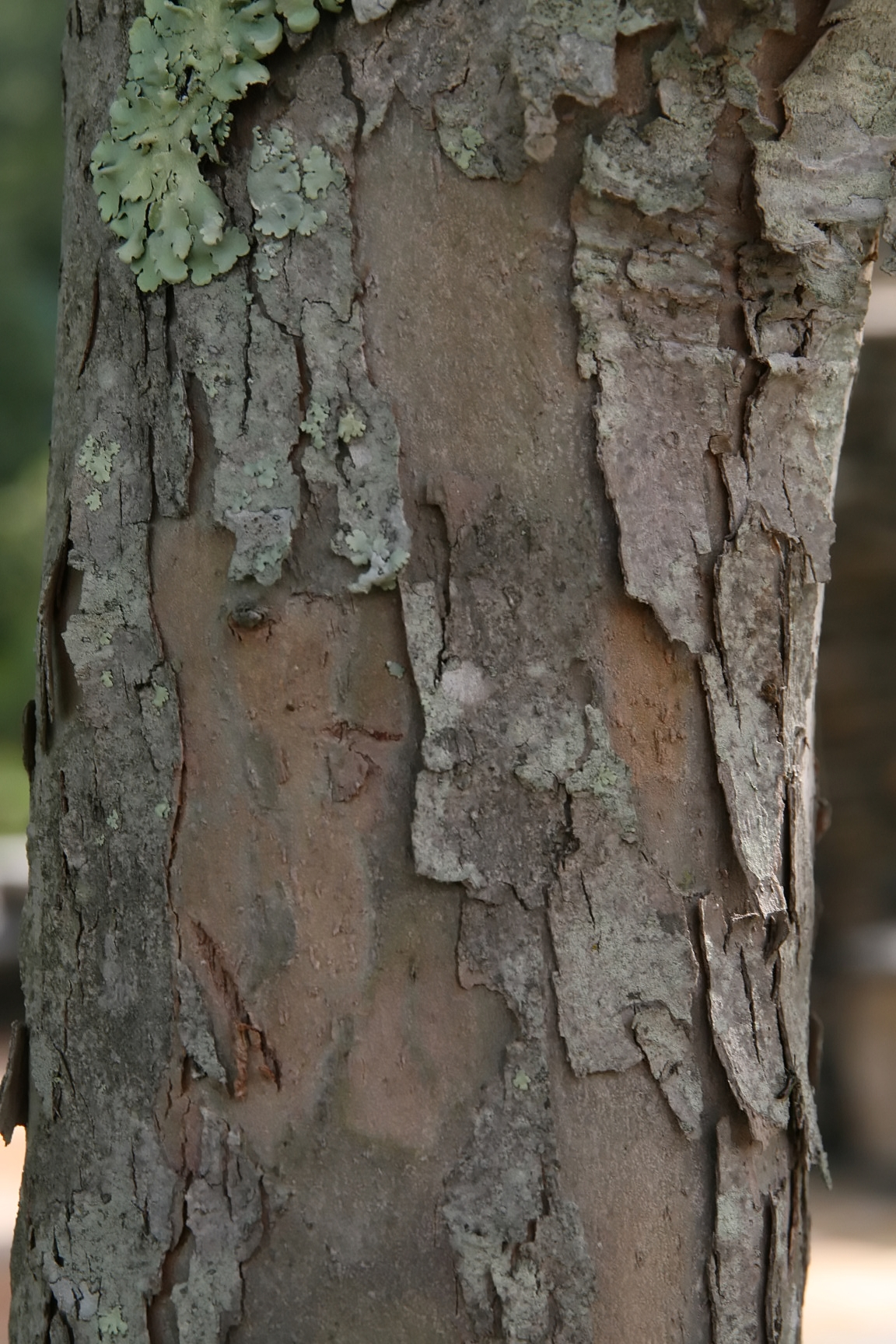
