= Crataegus canbyi =

Scientific classification
- Kingdom: Plantae
- Clade: Tracheophytes
- Clade: Angiosperms
- Clade: Eudicots
- Clade: Rosids
- Order: Rosales
- Family: Rosaceae
- Genus: Crataegus
- Section: Crataegus sect. Coccineae
- Series: Crataegus ser. Crus-galli
- Species: C. canbyi

Binomial name
- Crataegus canbyi Sarg.

Species of hawthorn

Crataegus canbyi is a hawthorn that is sometimes considered to be a synonym of C. crus-galli.
