= Crataegus putnamiana =

Scientific classification
- Kingdom: Plantae
- Clade: Tracheophytes
- Clade: Angiosperms
- Clade: Eudicots
- Clade: Rosids
- Order: Rosales
- Family: Rosaceae
- Genus: Crataegus
- Species: C. putnamiana

Binomial name
- Crataegus putnamiana Sarg.

Species of hawthorn

Crataegus putnamiana is a rare species of North American hawthorn derived from hybridization between a species in Crataegus series Coccineae and a species in series Dilatatae.
