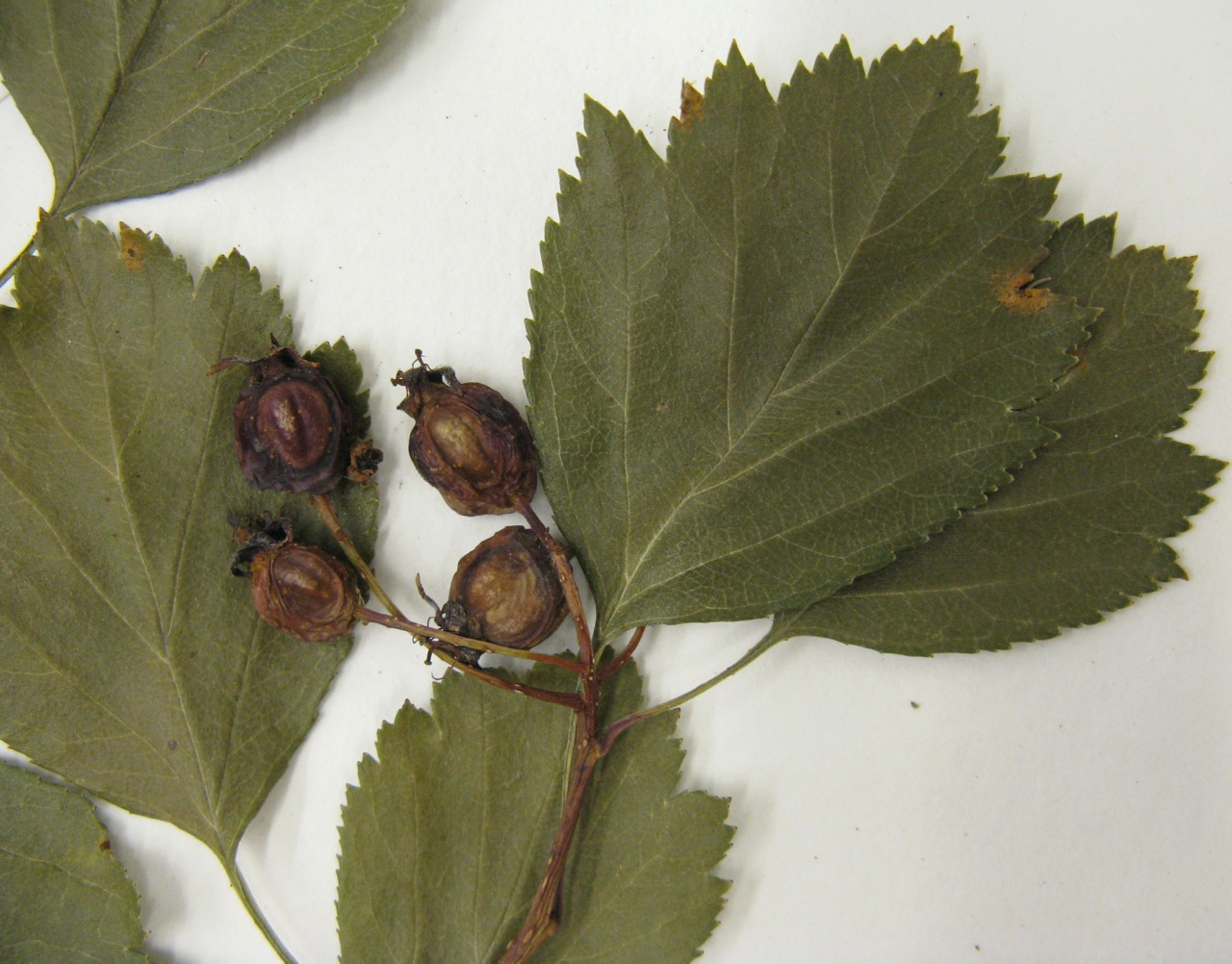

Scientific classification
- Kingdom: Plantae
- Clade: Tracheophytes
- Clade: Angiosperms
- Clade: Eudicots
- Clade: Rosids
- Order: Rosales
- Family: Rosaceae
- Genus: Crataegus
- Species: C. purpurella

Binomial name
- Crataegus purpurella J.B.Phipps & R.O'Kennon

= Crataegus purpurella =

Species of flowering plant

Crataegus purpurella, also known as the Loch Lomond hawthorn, is a plant in the Crataegus genus. It is endemic to Saskatchewan, Canada, and is unranked by NatureServe.
