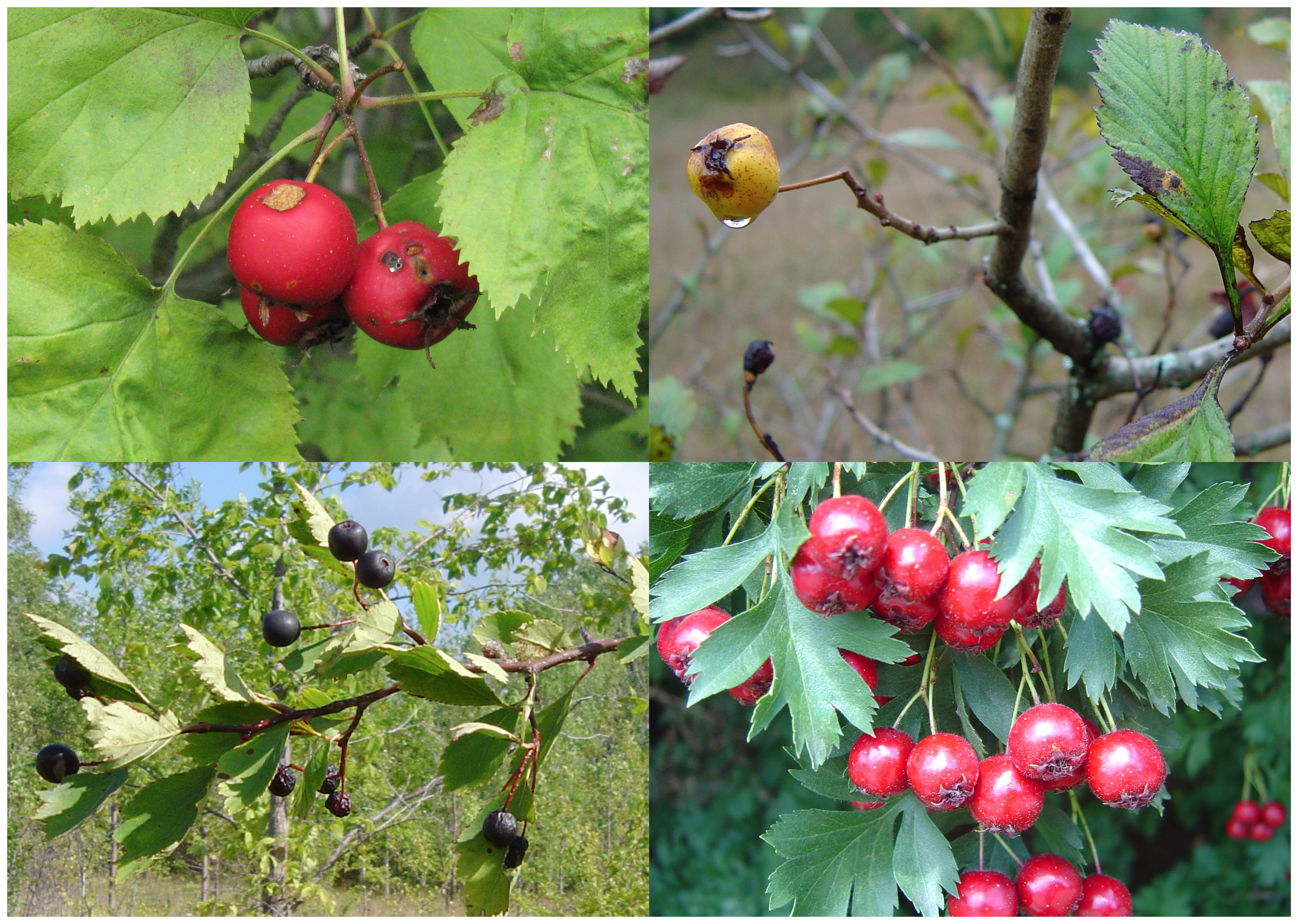
- Fruit of four different species of Crataegus (clockwise from top left: C. coccinea, C. punctata yellow form, C. ambigua and C. douglasii)

Scientific classification
- Kingdom: Plantae
- Clade: Embryophytes
- Clade: Tracheophytes
- Clade: Angiosperms
- Clade: Eudicots
- Clade: Rosids
- Order: Rosales
- Family: Rosaceae
- Subfamily: Amygdaloideae
- Tribe: Maleae
- Subtribe: Malinae
- Genus: Crataegus; Tourn. ex L.

Type species
- Crataegus rhipidophylla Gand.

Synonyms
- Anthomeles M.Roem.; + Crataegomespilus Simon-Louis ex Bellair; × Crataemespilus E.G.Camus; Halmia (Medik.) M.Roem.; Mespilophora Neck., opus utique oppr.; Mespilus L.; Oxyacantha Medik.; Phaenopyrum M.Roem.; Phalacros Wenz.; Sportella Hance; Xeromalon Raf.

= Crataegus =

Hawthorns Temporal range: Eocene–Recent

Genus of flowering plants in the rose family Rosaceae

Crataegus (/krəˈtiːɡəs/), commonly called hawthorn, quickthorn, thornapple, May-tree, whitethorn, Mayflower or hawberry, is a genus of several hundred species of shrubs and trees in the family Rosaceae, native to temperate regions of the Northern Hemisphere in Europe, Asia, North Africa and North America. The name "hawthorn" was originally applied to the species native to northern Europe, especially the common hawthorn C. monogyna, and the unmodified name is often so used in Britain and Ireland. The name is now also applied to the entire genus and to the related Asian genus Rhaphiolepis.

== Description ==
Crataegus species are shrubs or small trees, mostly growing to 5–15 m (15–50 ft) tall, with small fruit and (usually) thorny branches. The most common type of bark is smooth grey in young individuals, developing shallow longitudinal fissures with narrow ridges in older trees. The thorns are sharp-tipped branches that arise either from other branches or from the trunk, and are typically 1–3 cm (1/2–1 in) long (recorded as up to 11.5 cm or 4 1/2 in in one case). The leaves grow spirally arranged on long shoots, and in clusters on spur shoots on the branches or twigs. The leaves of most species have lobed or serrated margins and are somewhat variable in shape. Flowers are five-petalled and grow in flat-topped clusters and are most typically white, although they can also be pale pink or occasionally scarlet in colour. The fruit, sometimes known as a "haw", appears berry-like but is structurally polypyrenous, with from one to five pyrenes that resemble the "stones" of plums, peaches, etc., which are drupaceous fruit in the same subfamily.

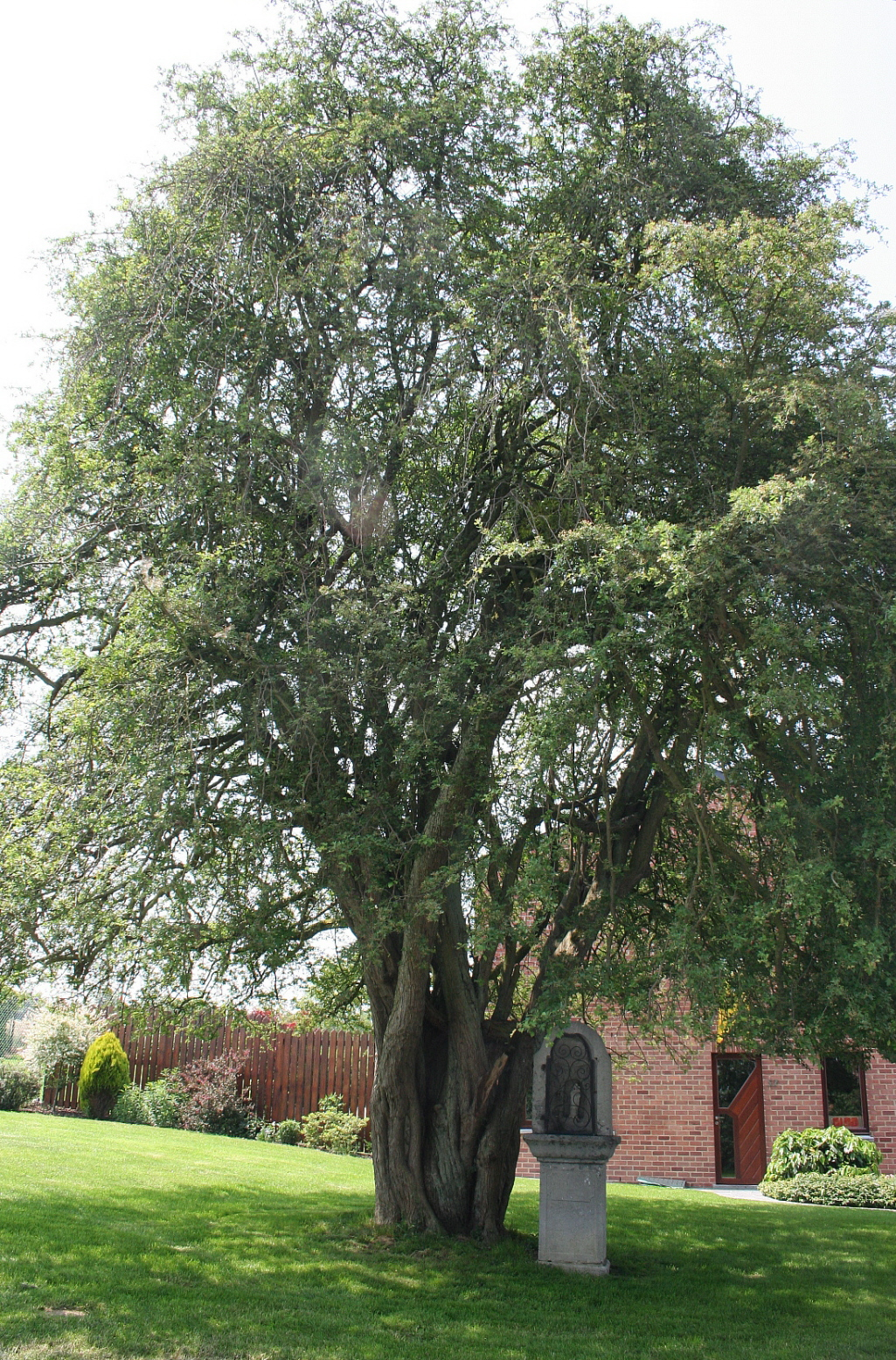
Crataegus monogyna

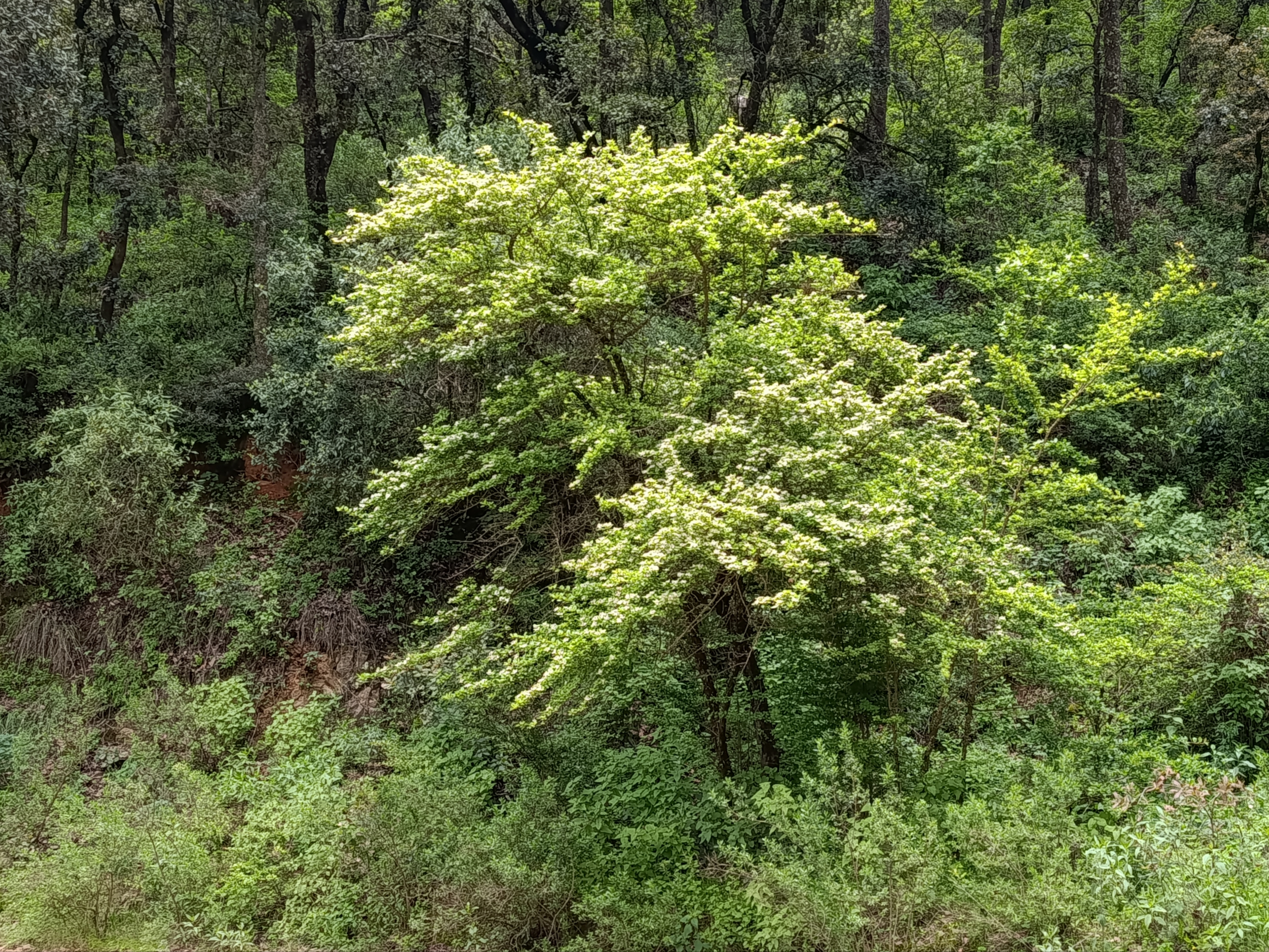
Crataegus mexicana

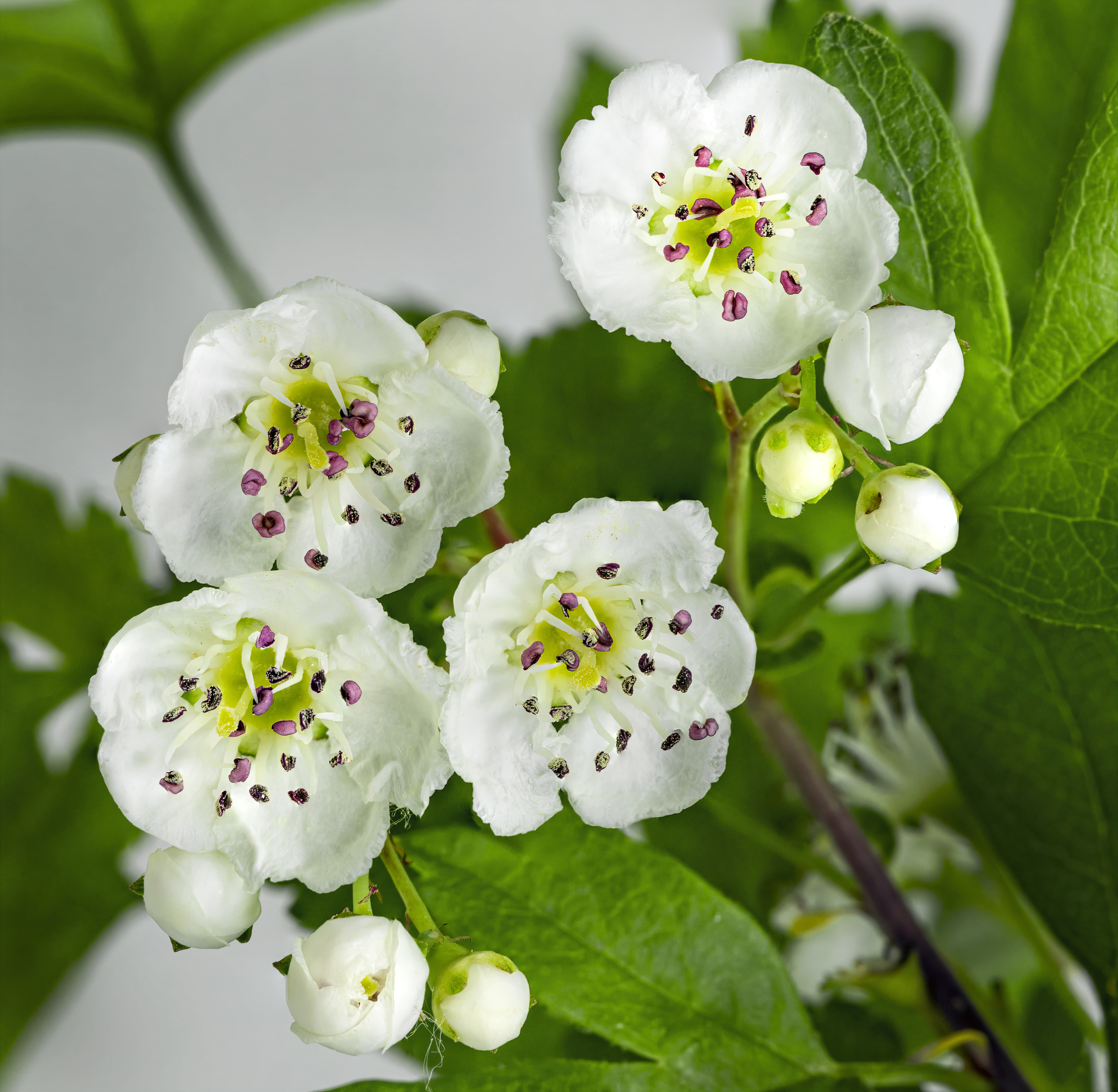
Close-up of C. monogyna flowers

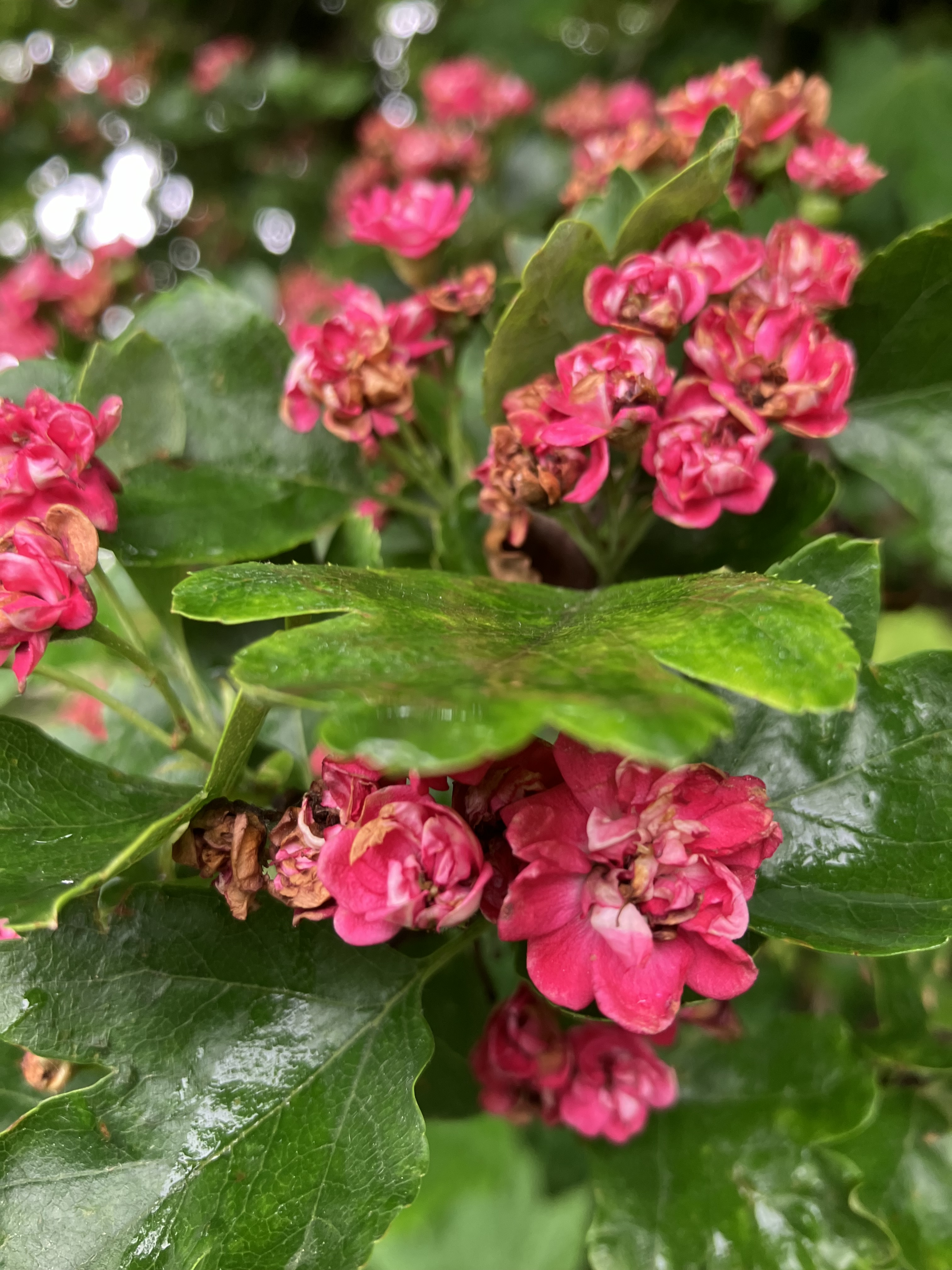
Scarlet hawthorn

== Taxonomy ==
The number of species in the genus depends on taxonomic interpretation. Some botanists in the past recognised 1000 or more species, many of which are apomictic microspecies. A reasonable number is estimated to be 200 species. The genus likely first appeared in the Eocene, with the ancestral area likely being Eastern North America and in Europe, which at that time remained closely linked due to the North Atlantic Land Bridge. The earliest known leaves of the genus from the Eocene of North America, with the earliest leaves from Europe being from the Oligocene.

The genus is classified into sections which are further divided into series. Series Montaninsulae has not yet been assigned to a section. The sections are:

- section Brevispinae
- section Crataegus
- section Coccineae
- section Cuneatae
- section Douglasia
- section Hupehensis
- section Macracanthae
- section Sanguineae

=== Selected species ===
As of August 2026 Plants of the World Online accepts 264 species and several naturally-occurring interspecific hybrids. Selected species include:

- Crataegus aemula – Rome hawthorn
- Crataegus aestivalis – May hawthorn
- Crataegus alabamensis – Alabama hawthorn
- Crataegus altaica – Altai hawthorn
- Crataegus ambigua – Russian hawthorn
- Crataegus ambitiosa – Grand Rapids hawthorn
- Crataegus anamesa – Fort Bend hawthorn
- Crataegus ancisa – Mississippi hawthorn
- Crataegus annosa – Phoenix City hawthorn
- Crataegus aprica – sunny hawthorn
- Crataegus arborea – Montgomery hawthorn
- Crataegus arcana – Carolina hawthorn
- Crataegus ater – Nashville hawthorn
- Crataegus austromontana – valley head hawthorn
- Crataegus azarolus – Azarole hawthorn
- Crataegus berberifolia – barberry hawthorn
- Crataegus biltmoreana – Biltmore hawthorn
- Crataegus boyntonii – stinking hawthorn
- Crataegus brachyacantha – blueberry hawthorn
- Crataegus brainerdii – Brainerd's hawthorn
- Crataegus calpodendron – late hawthorn
- Crataegus canbyi
- Crataegus chlorosarca
- Crataegus chrysocarpa – fireberry hawthorn
- Crataegus coccinea – scarlet hawthorn
- Crataegus coccinioides – Kansas hawthorn
- Crataegus collina – hillside hawthorn
- Crataegus crus-galli – cockspur hawthorn
- Crataegus cuneata – Japanese hawthorn
- Crataegus cupulifera
- Crataegus dahurica
- Crataegus dilatata – broadleaf hawthorn, Apple-leaf hawthorn
- Crataegus douglasii – black hawthorn, Douglas hawthorn
- Crataegus ellwangeriana
- Crataegus erythropoda – cerro hawthorn
- Crataegus flabellata – Gray's hawthorn, fanleaf hawthorn
- Crataegus flava – yellow-fruited hawthorn
- Crataegus fluviatilis
- Crataegus fontanesiana
- Crataegus greggiana – Gregg's hawthorn
- Crataegus harbisonii – Harbison's hawthorn
- Crataegus heldreichii
- Crataegus heterophylla – various-leaved hawthorn
- Crataegus holmesiana – Holmes' hawthorn
- Crataegus hupehensis
- Crataegus intricata – thicket hawthorn, intricate hawthorn
- Crataegus iracunda – stolon–bearing hawthorn
- Crataegus jackii
- Crataegus jonesae
- Crataegus kansuensis – Gansu hawthorn
- Crataegus laevigata – Midland hawthorn, English hawthorn
- Crataegus lassa – sandhill hawthorn
- Crataegus lepida
- Crataegus macrosperma – big-fruit hawthorn
- Crataegus marshallii – parsley-leaved hawthorn
- Crataegus maximowiczii
- Crataegus mercerensis
- Crataegus mexicana – tejocote, Mexican hawthorn
- Crataegus mollis – downy hawthorn
- Crataegus monogyna – common hawthorn, oneseed hawthorn
- Crataegus nigra – Hungarian hawthorn
- Crataegus okanaganensis – Okanagan Valley hawthorn
- Crataegus opaca – western mayhaw
- Crataegus orientalis – oriental hawthorn
- Crataegus pedicellata – scarlet hawthorn
- Crataegus pennsylvanica – Pennsylvania thorn
- Crataegus pentagyna – small-flowered black hawthorn
- Crataegus peregrina
- Crataegus persimilis – plumleaf hawthorn
- Crataegus phaenopyrum – Washington hawthorn
- Crataegus phippsii
- Crataegus pinnatifida – Chinese hawthorn
- Crataegus populnea – poplar hawthorn
- Crataegus pratensis – prairie hawthorn
- Crataegus pruinosa – frosted hawthorn
- Crataegus pulcherrima – beautiful hawthorn
- Crataegus punctata – dotted hawthorn, white hawthorn: sometimes claimed as the state flower of Missouri, though the legislation does not specify a species
- Crataegus purpurella – Loch Lomond hawthorn
- Crataegus putnamiana
- Crataegus pycnoloba
- Crataegus reverchonii – Reverchon's hawthorn
- Crataegus rhipidophylla
- Crataegus rivularis – river hawthorn
- Crataegus saligna – willow hawthorn
- Crataegus sanguinea – redhaw hawthorn, Siberian hawthorn
- Crataegus sargentii – Sargent's hawthorn
- Crataegus scabrida – rough hawthorn
- Crataegus scabrifolia
- Crataegus songarica
- Crataegus spathulata – littlehip hawthorn
- Crataegus submollis – Quebec hawthorn
- Crataegus succulenta – fleshy hawthorn
- Crataegus tanacetifolia – tansy–leaved thorn
- Crataegus texana – Texas hawthorn
- Crataegus tracyi – Tracy hawthorn
- Crataegus triflora – three-flowered hawthorn
- Crataegus uniflora – one-flowered hawthorn, dwarf hawthorn
- Crataegus viridis – green hawthorn, including cultivar 'Winter King'
- Crataegus visenda
- Crataegus vulsa – Alabama hawthorn
- Crataegus wattiana – Altai hawthorn
- Crataegus wilsonii – Wilson hawthorn

=== Selected hybrids ===
- Crataegus × ariifolia (= C. ariaefolia)
- Crataegus × dsungarica
- Crataegus × grignonensis – Grignon hawthorn, an unpublished name
- Crataegus × lavalleei – Lavallée hawthorn, including Crataegus × carrierei
- Crataegus × macrocarpa
- Crataegus × media – the name for C. monogyna × C. laevigata hybrids
- Crataegus × mordenensis – Morden hawthorn, including 'Toba' and 'Snowbird'
- Crataegus × ruscinonensis – Hybrid Hawthorn, Whithorn, Single-seed Hawthorn. Hybrid between C. azarolus and C. monogyna.
- Crataegus × sinaica – za'rur
- Crataegus × smithiana – red Mexican hawthorn, an unpublished name
- Crataegus × vailiae

=== Graft-chimaera ===
Together with the genus Pyrus, it forms the graft-chimaera + Pyrocrataegus.

=== Etymology ===
The generic epithet, Crataegus, is derived from the Greek kratos "strength" because of the great strength of the wood and akis "sharp", referring to the thorns of some species. The name haw, originally an Old English term for hedge (from the Anglo-Saxon term haguthorn, "a fence with thorns"), also applies to the fruit.

== Ecology ==
Hawthorns provide food and shelter for many species of birds and mammals, and the flowers are important for many nectar-feeding insects. Hawthorns are also used as food plants by the larvae of a large number of Lepidoptera species, such as the small eggar moth, E. lanestris. Haws are important for wildlife in winter, particularly thrushes and waxwings; these birds eat the haws and disperse the seeds in their droppings.

== Propagation ==
Although it is commonly stated that hawthorns can be propagated by cutting, this is difficult to achieve with rootless stem pieces. Small plants or suckers are often transplanted from the wild. Seeds require stratification and take one or two years to germinate. Seed germination is improved if the pyrenes that contain the seed are subjected to extensive drying at room temperature, before stratification. Uncommon forms can be grafted onto seedlings of other species.

== Uses ==
=== Culinary use ===
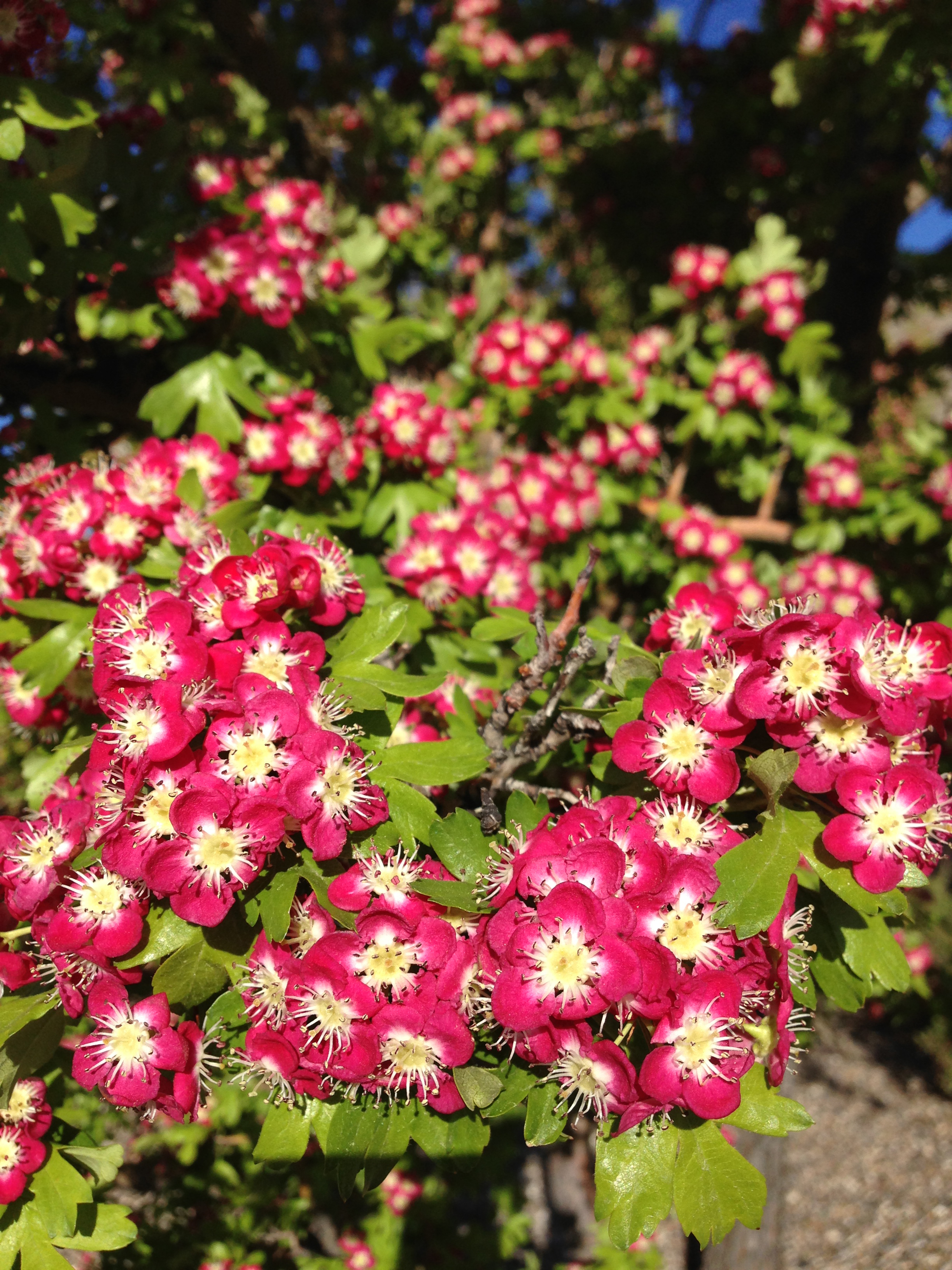
Crataegus monogyna 'Crimson Cloud' in Elko, Nevada

The "haws" or fruits of the common hawthorn, C. monogyna, are edible. In the United Kingdom, they are sometimes used to make a jelly or homemade wine. The leaves are edible, and if picked in spring when still young, are tender enough to be used in salads. The young leaves and flower buds, which are also edible, are known as "bread and cheese" in rural England. In the southern United States, fruits of three native species, C. aestivalis, C. opaca and C. rufula, are collectively known as mayhaws and are made into conserves and pies and fermented into wine. The Kutenai people of northwestern North America used red and black hawthorn fruit for food.

On Manitoulin Island, Ontario, some red-fruited species are called hawberries. During colonisation, European settlers ate these fruits during the winter as the only remaining food supply. People born on the island are now called "haweaters".

In Mexico, the fruit of many Crataegus species are known as tejocotes, but only C. mexicana appears to be cultivated for culinary use. They are stuffed in the piñatas broken during the traditional pre-Christmas celebration known as Las Posadas. They are also cooked with other fruits to prepare a Christmas punch. The mixture of tejocote paste, sugar and chili powder produces a popular Mexican candy called rielitos, which is manufactured by several brands.

The fruits of the species C. pinnatifida (Chinese hawthorn), and particularly the large-fruited C. pinnatifida var. major are cultivated. They are tart, bright red and resemble small crabapple fruits. They are used to make many kinds of Chinese snacks, such as tanghulu — coated in sugar syrup and skewered – and haw flakes. The fruits, which are called 山楂 shān zhā in Chinese, are also used to produce jams, jellies, juices, alcoholic beverages and other drinks; these could in turn be used in other dishes (for instance, many older recipes for Cantonese sweet and sour sauce call for shānzhā jam). In South Korea, a liquor called sansachun (산사춘) is made from the fruits.

In Iran, the fruits of Crataegus (including Crataegus azarolus var. aronia, as well as other species) are known as zâlzâlak and eaten raw as a snack, or made into a jam known by the same name.

The fruits of North America's C. greggiana are made into preserves.

=== Research ===
A 2008 Cochrane Collaboration meta-analysis of previous studies concluded that evidence exists of "a significant benefit in symptom control and physiologic outcomes" for an extract of hawthorn used as an adjuvant in treating chronic heart failure. A 2010 review concluded that "Crataegus [hawthorn] preparations hold significant potential as a useful remedy in the treatment of cardiovascular disease". The review indicated the need for further study of the best dosages and concluded that although "many different theoretical interactions between Crataegus and orthodox medications have been postulated ... none have [yet] been substantiated."

Phytochemicals found in hawthorn include tannins, flavonoids, oligomeric proanthocyanidins and phenolic acids.

=== Traditional medicine ===
Several species of hawthorn have been used in traditional medicine. The products used are often derived from C. monogyna, C. laevigata, or related Crataegus species, sometimes generally referred to as hawthorn without distinguishment. The dried fruits of C. pinnatifida (called shān zhā in Chinese) are used in traditional Chinese medicine, primarily as a digestive aid. A closely related species, C. cuneata (Japanese hawthorn, called sanzashi in Japanese) is used in a similar manner. Other species (especially Crataegus laevigata) are used in herbal medicine where the plant is believed to strengthen cardiovascular function.

The Kutenai people of northwestern North America used black hawthorn fruit (Kutenai language: kaⱡa; approximate pronunciation: kasha) for food, and red hawthorn fruit (Kutenai language: ⱡupⱡi; approximate pronunciation: shupshi) in traditional medicine.

==== Side effects ====
Overdose can cause cardiac arrhythmia and low blood pressure, while milder side effects include nausea and dizziness. Patients taking digoxin should avoid taking hawthorn.

=== Landscaping ===
Many species and hybrids are used as ornamental and street trees. The common hawthorn is extensively used in Europe as a hedge plant. During the British Agricultural Revolution in the eighteenth and nineteenth centuries, hawthorn saplings were mass propagated in nurseries to create the new field boundaries required by the Inclosure Acts. Several cultivars of the Midland hawthorn C. laevigata have been selected for their pink or red flowers. Hawthorns are among the trees most recommended for water conservation landscapes.

=== Grafting ===
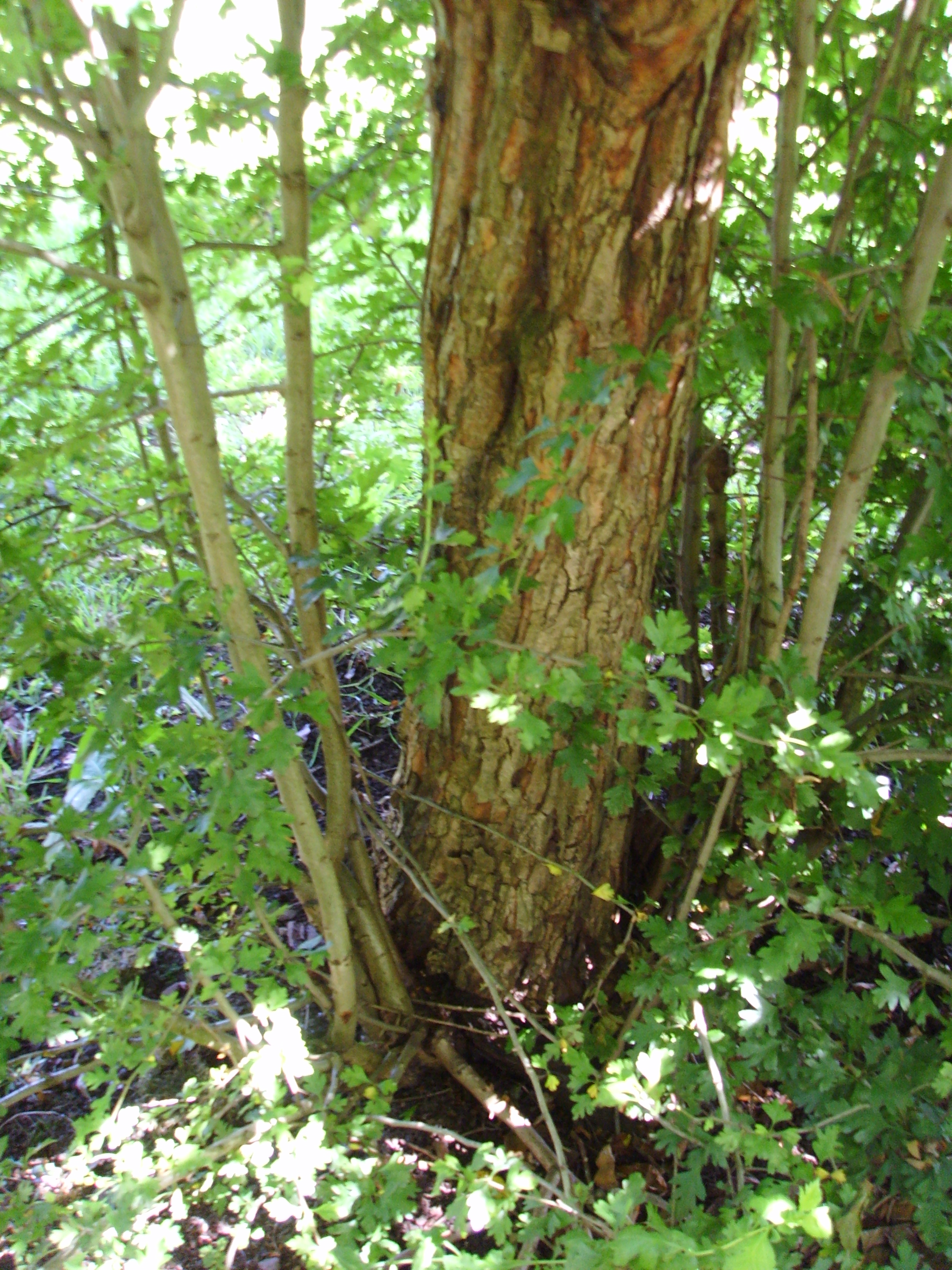
Hawthorn rootstock on a medlar tree in Totnes, UK

Hawthorn can be used as a rootstock in the practice of grafting. It is graft-compatible with Mespilus (medlar) and with pear, and makes a hardier rootstock than quince, but the thorny suckering habit of the hawthorn can be problematic.

Seedlings of Crataegus monogyna have been used to graft multiple species on the same trunk, such as pink hawthorn, pear tree and medlar, the result being trees which give pink and white flowers in May and fruits during the summer. "Chip budding" has also been performed on hawthorn trunks to have branches of several varieties on the same tree. Such trees can be seen in Vigo, Spain, and in the northwest of France (mainly in Brittany).

=== Bonsai ===
Many species of hawthorn make excellent bonsai trees. They are grown and enjoyed for their display of flowers.

=== Other uses ===
The wood of some Crataegus species is hard and resistant to rot. In rural North America, it was prized for use as tool handles and fence posts. First Nations people of western Canada used the thorns for durable fish hooks and minor skin surgeries.

== In culture ==
The Scots saying "Ne'er cast a cloot til Mey's oot" conveys a warning not to shed any (clothes) before the summer has fully arrived and the mayflowers (hawthorn blossoms) are in full bloom.

The custom of employing the flowering branches for decorative purposes on May Day (1 May) is of very early origin, but since the adoption of the Gregorian calendar in 1752, the tree has rarely been in full bloom in England before the second week of that month. In the Scottish Highlands, the flowers may be seen as late as the middle of June. The hawthorn has been regarded as the emblem of hope, and its branches are stated to have been carried by the ancient Greeks in wedding processions, and to have been used by them to deck the altar of Hymenaios. The supposition that the tree was the source of Jesus's crown of thorns doubtless gave rise to the tradition among the French peasantry (current as late as 1911) that it utters groans and cries on Good Friday, and probably also to the old popular superstition in Great Britain and Ireland that ill luck attended the uprooting of hawthorns. Branches of Glastonbury thorn (C. monogyna 'Biflora', sometimes called C. oxyacantha var. praecox), which flowers both in December and in spring, were formerly highly valued in England, on account of the legend that the tree was originally the staff of Joseph of Arimathea.

Robert Graves, in his book The White Goddess, traces and reinterprets many European legends and myths in which the whitethorn (hawthorn), also called the May-tree, is central.

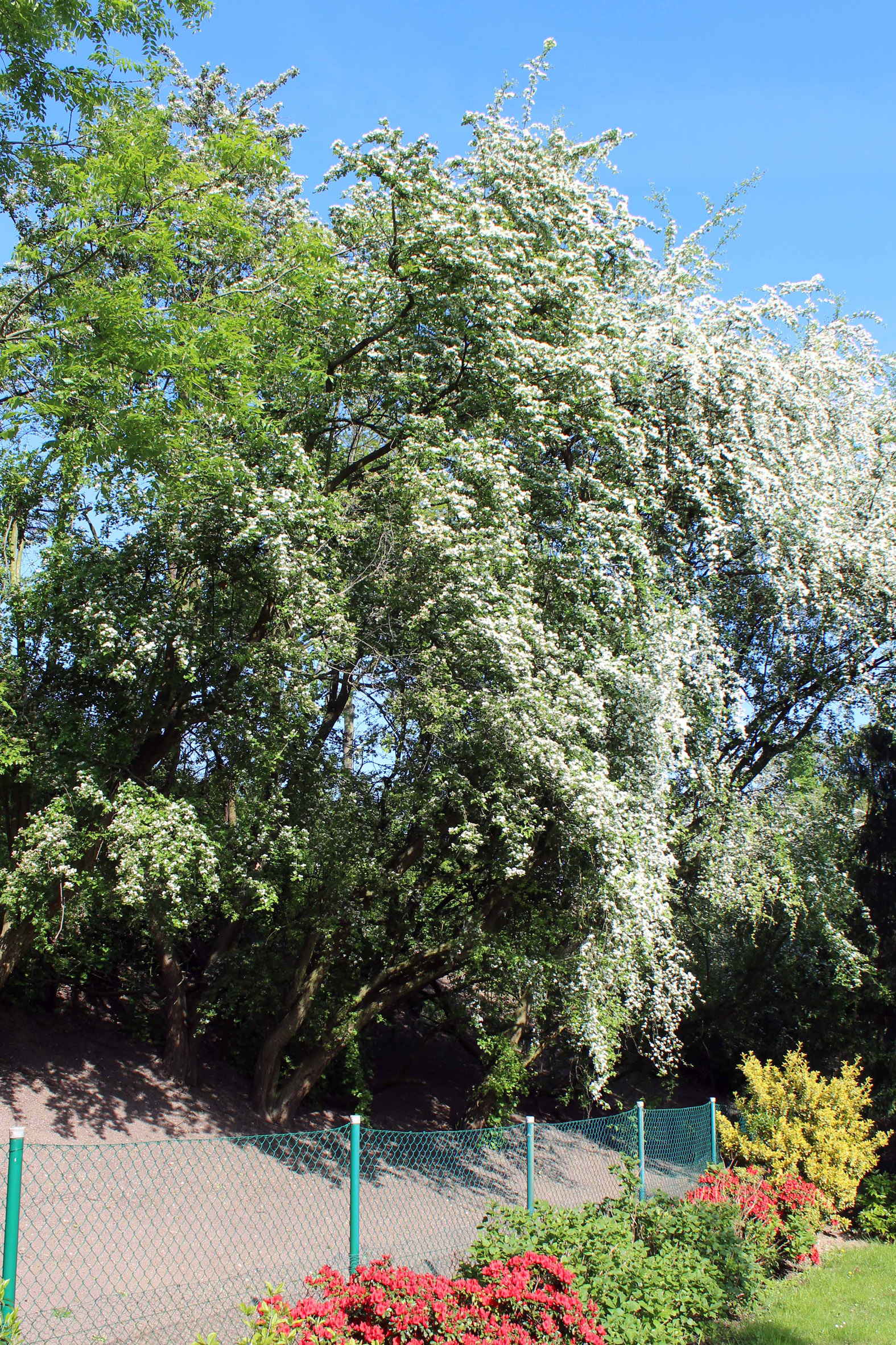
Hawthorn trees demarcate a garden plot; according to legend, they are strongly associated with the fairies.

It was once said to heal the broken heart. In Ireland, the red fruit is, or was, called the Johnny MacGorey or Magory.

Serbian folklore that spread across Balkan notes that hawthorn (Serbian глог or glog) is essential to kill vampires, and stakes used for their slaying must be made from the wood of the thorn tree.

In Gaelic folklore, hawthorn (in Scottish Gaelic, sgitheach and in Irish, sceach) 'marks the entrance to the otherworld' and is strongly associated with the fairies. Lore has it that it is very unlucky to cut the tree at any time other than when it is in bloom; however, during this time, it is commonly cut and decorated as a May bush (see Beltane). This warning persists to modern times; folklorist Bob Curran has questioned whether the ill luck of the DeLorean Motor Company was associated with the destruction of a fairy thorn to make way for a production facility.

The superstitious dread of harming hawthorn trees prevalent in Britain and Ireland may also be connected to an old belief that hawthorns, and more especially 'lone thorns' (self-seeded specimens standing in isolation from other trees) originate from lightning or thunderbolts and give protection from lightning strikes.

Hawthorn trees are often found beside clootie wells; at these types of holy wells, they are sometimes known as rag trees, for the strips of cloth which are tied to them as part of healing rituals. 'When all fruit fails, welcome haws' was once a common expression in Ireland.

According to a medieval legend, the Glastonbury thorn, C. monogyna 'Biflora', which flowers twice annually, was supposed to have miraculously grown from a walking stick planted by Joseph of Arimathea at Glastonbury in Somerset, England. The original tree was destroyed in the sixteenth century during the English Reformation, but several cultivars have survived. Since the reign of King James I, it has been a Christmas custom to send a sprig of Glastonbury thorn flowers to the Sovereign, which is used to decorate the royal family's dinner table.

In the Victorian era, the hawthorn represented hope in the language of flowers.

The hawthorn – species unspecified – is the state flower of Missouri. The legislation designating it as such was introduced by Sarah Lucille Turner, one of the first two women to serve in the Missouri House of Representatives.
