= Crataegus austromontana =

Scientific classification
- Kingdom: Plantae
- Clade: Tracheophytes
- Clade: Angiosperms
- Clade: Eudicots
- Clade: Rosids
- Order: Rosales
- Family: Rosaceae
- Genus: Crataegus
- Section: Crataegus sect. Coccineae
- Series: Crataegus ser. Triflorae
- Species: C. austromontana

Binomial name
- Crataegus austromontana Beadle

Species of hawthorn

Crataegus austromontana, with common name Valley Head hawthorn, is a very rare species of hawthorn that is possibly extinct. It grows as a shrub or tree 4–5 metres (13–16 ft) in height.

== Distribution ==
Crataegus austromontana was found in Alabama and Tennessee. The last time that a herbarium specimen was collected was in 1916. Previously believed to be extinct during a 107 year period where no living plants were found. Crataegus austromontana was recently rediscovered in Paint Rock, AL and Northwest GA in 2023.
