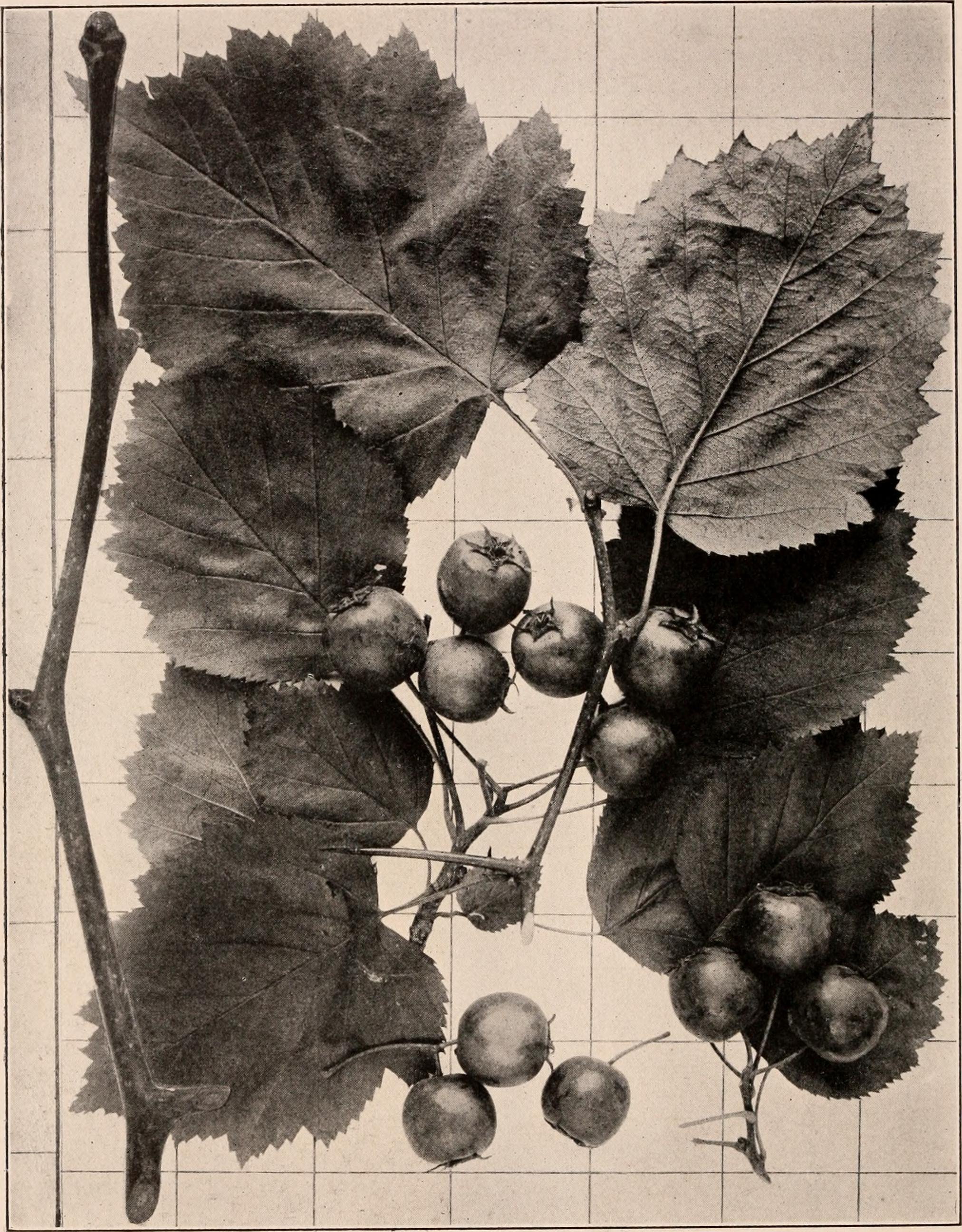

Scientific classification
- Kingdom: Plantae
- Clade: Tracheophytes
- Clade: Angiosperms
- Clade: Eudicots
- Clade: Rosids
- Order: Rosales
- Family: Rosaceae
- Genus: Crataegus
- Section: Crataegus sect. Coccineae
- Series: Crataegus ser. Coccineae
- Species: C. ellwangeriana

Binomial name
- Crataegus ellwangeriana Sarg.

= Crataegus ellwangeriana =

Species of hawthorn

Crataegus ellwangeriana is a named hawthorn species that has been poorly understood and often misidentified. It is now considered to be a synonym of C. coccinea var. coccinea. A study concluded, that C. pennsylvanica of series Molles has frequently been misidentified as C. ellwangeriana.
