= Crataegus visenda =

Scientific classification
- Kingdom: Plantae
- Clade: Tracheophytes
- Clade: Angiosperms
- Clade: Eudicots
- Clade: Rosids
- Order: Rosales
- Family: Rosaceae
- Genus: Crataegus
- Section: Crataegus sect. Coccineae
- Series: Crataegus ser. Apricae
- Species: C. visenda

Binomial name
- Crataegus visenda Beadle

Synonyms
- C. arrogans Beadle; C. sororia Beadle var. visenda (Beadle) R. W. Lance; C. tristis Beadle

Species of hawthorn

Crataegus visenda is a species of hawthorn from the southeastern United States, in Alabama, Florida, and Georgia. It is a large shrub or small tree to 10 m tall. It has been considered as a synonym of Crataegus flava Aiton (Ref. USDA Plants Profile)
