= Crataegus arborea =

Scientific classification
- Kingdom: Plantae
- Clade: Tracheophytes
- Clade: Angiosperms
- Clade: Eudicots
- Clade: Rosids
- Order: Rosales
- Family: Rosaceae
- Genus: Crataegus
- Section: Crataegus sect. Coccineae
- Series: Crataegus ser. Crus-galli
- Species: C. arborea

Binomial name
- Crataegus arborea Beadle

Synonyms
- Crataegus ohioensis Sarg.; Crataegus pyracanthoides Beadle; Crataegus arborea var. ohioensis (Sarg.) Kruschke; Crataegus pyracanthoides var. arborea (Beadle) E.J.Palmer

Species of hawthorn

Crataegus arborea, the Montgomery hawthorn, is a North American species of hawthorn, native to the eastern United States. It is a shrub or small tree.

== Distribution ==
Crataegus arborea is found in Alabama, Arkansas, Florida, Indiana, Missouri, Ohio, Tennessee, and West Virginia.
