= Crataegus dilatata =

Scientific classification
- Kingdom: Plantae
- Clade: Embryophytes
- Clade: Tracheophytes
- Clade: Spermatophytes
- Clade: Angiosperms
- Clade: Eudicots
- Clade: Rosids
- Order: Rosales
- Family: Rosaceae
- Genus: Crataegus
- Section: Crataegus sect. Crataegus
- Series: Crataegus ser. Crataegus
- Species: C. dilatata

Binomial name
- Crataegus dilatata Sarg.

Species of hawthorn

Crataegus dilatata is a species of hawthorn known by the common names broadleaf hawthorn and apple-leaf hawthorn. Crataegus dilatata is native from New York to New England, and the southernmost parts of Ontario and Quebec. They grow to a height of 20 feet (6.1 m). The leaves are 2 to 2.5 inches (51 to 64 mm) long, broadly ovate, short pointed at the tip, notched or rounded at the base, coarsely doubly saw-toothed and usually with several shallow lobes. The Latin name means "dilated" or "spread out" which describes the broad leaves.
