= Crataegus scabrida =

Scientific classification
- Kingdom: Plantae
- Clade: Tracheophytes
- Clade: Angiosperms
- Clade: Eudicots
- Clade: Rosids
- Order: Rosales
- Family: Rosaceae
- Genus: Crataegus
- Species: C. scabrida

Binomial name
- Crataegus scabrida Beadle

Synonyms
- C. asperifolia Sarg. C. dunbarii Sarg. C. improvisa Sarg. C. iterata Sarg. C. pinguis Sarg.

Species of hawthorn

Crataegus scabrida is a species of hawthorn.
