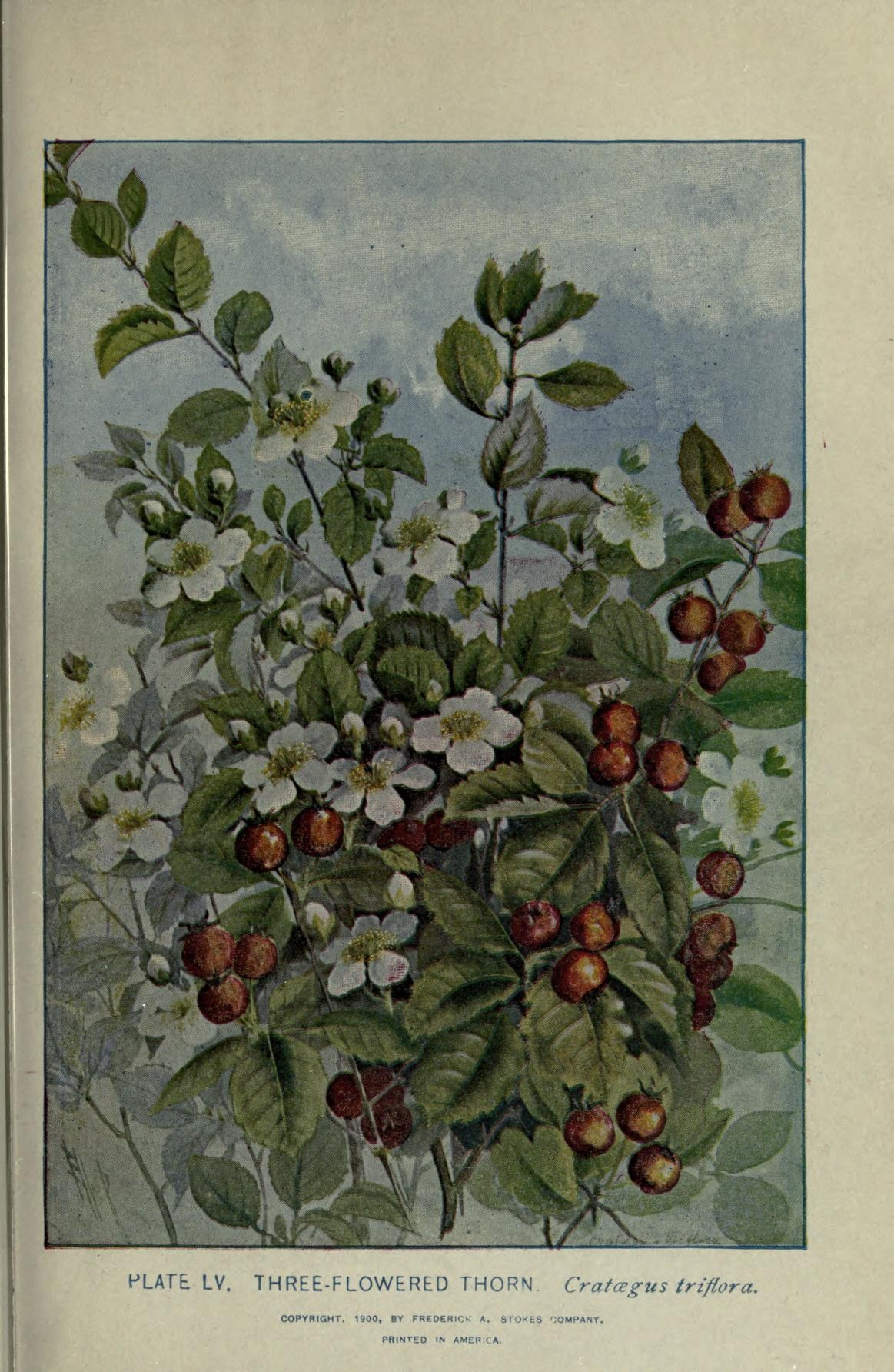
- Illustration by Ellis Rowan

Scientific classification
- Kingdom: Plantae
- Clade: Tracheophytes
- Clade: Angiosperms
- Clade: Eudicots
- Clade: Rosids
- Order: Rosales
- Family: Rosaceae
- Genus: Crataegus
- Section: Crataegus sect. Coccineae
- Series: Crataegus ser. Triflorae
- Species: C. triflora

Binomial name
- Crataegus triflora Chapm.

= Crataegus triflora =

Three-flowered hawthorn

Species of hawthorn

== Overview ==
Crataegus triflora is an uncommon hawthorn species of the south-eastern United States, of known by the common name three-flowered hawthorn.

== Physical Description ==
Picture of the dried leaves of Crataegus triflora

=== Leaves ===
Leaves of Crataegus triflora are green and oval-shaped. Each leaf has a toothed edge and shallow lobes. Each leaf has a single blade and 5-7 veins per side. The leaf shape is “blade broadly elliptic (3-8 cm)”. The stems include compound thorns. The twigs are a brown, gray color. Thorns are located on the twigs. They are straight, dark gray or black, and extremely thin (around 2-4 cm).

Crataegus triflora with flowers

=== Flowers ===
Crataegus triflora produces flowers approximately 25-30 mm wide, similar to the size of a wild rose. It is vascular, meaning that the flower has an intricate piping system along the inside, allowing for transport of water, minerals, and food. Its inflorescences usually contain clusters of 2-6 flowers, though clusters can contain up to 12, and are developed on peduncles around 2-5 centers arising laterally from the extension of shoots rather than short woody shoots. The flowers are quite large for hawthorn flowers, and although rarely cultivated, they can be very attractive if well grown. The fruit is medium-sized, sub globose, hairy, red, and has long, spreading calyx lobes. It is also medium-sized, including about 3-5 nutlets. It is a multi-stemmed shrub 3 to 5 metres (10 to 16 feet) tall.

=== Stamen ===
Stamen is the male reproductive organ in the flower and is composed of filament and anther. In Crataegus triflora, there are more stamen then in any other species of Crataegus, ranging from 10 to up to 45 per flower. In Louisiana, in some flowers like C. ashei, some leaves and flowers are smaller, but the stamen number generally stays the same.

== Ecosystem ==
Crataegus triflora, commonly referred to as the three-flower hawthorn, is geographically located in six southeastern states. Primarily found in Alabama, Mississippi, Georgia, with rarer appeareances in Tennessee, Arkansas, and Louisiana. Crataegus triflora grows in several habitats but is most frequently in an ecosystem with an influx of shrubs, small trees, and light openings. Examples of the habitats are pine forests, canopy gaps in hardwood forests, and prairie margins. Additionally, these flowers prefer extremely fertile clay rich areas. These ecosystems contain lots of grazing animals, such as cattle and horses. Crategus triflora and the hawthorn family interact with a variety of animals and their ecosystems. Their flowers provide nectar and pollen and are pollinated by insects such as bees, wasps, and flies. Birds feed on the hawthorns fruits and help disperse the seeds to new areas. Finally, C. triflora’s shrubs provide shelter and nesting sites.

== Specific Threats and Conservation Status ==
In the states of Alabama and Mississippi, Crataegus triflora holds a S2 conservation status, meaning that it is imperiled. In the states of Arkansas, Louisiana, and Georgia, the Crataegus triflora holds an S1 conservation status, meaning that it is critically imperiled. These five states make up the core area range for where the Crataegus triflora is found, and it is unknown if there are any occurrences outside of this range. Within this range, there are 44 known occurrences (populations), but each one has less than 50 individual plants present. The main threats to the Crataegus triflora are grazing, fire, clearing, and cedar apple rust.

== Phylogeny ==
Simplified phylogenic tree of Crataegus triflora

There are many closely related species of Crataegus triflora, including more than 10 other species in the genus Crataegus. Defining characteristics include, but are not limited to, the number of stamen, leaf shape and orientation, fruit color, flower size, and the presence or absence of thorns. Crataegus triflora, specifically, share many similarities with wild roses, genus Rosa, like its flower size and number. However, other species such as Mespulis canescens exhibit characteristics that are rare in Crataegus plants despite shared ancestry. For example, Mespulis canescens typically produce inflorescenses on the sides of the stems instead of the top of the stem. While Crateagus triflora also exhibit this characteristic, it is one of the only Crataegus plants to do so.
