= List of Crataegus species =

Crataegus is a large genus of flowering plants in the family Rosaceae. As of August 2026 Plants of the World Online accepts 264 species and several interspecific hybrids in the genus.

== A ==
- Crataegus aestivalis (Walter) Torr. & A.Gray
- Crataegus alabamensis Beadle
- Crataegus × albanica Pojark.
- Crataegus alleghaniensis Beadle
- Crataegus ambigua C.A.Mey. ex A.K.Becker
- Crataegus × amicta Ashe
- Crataegus apiifolia (Marshall) Rössig
- Crataegus aprica Beadle
- Crataegus aquacervensis J.B.Phipps & R.O'Kennon
- Crataegus × armena Pojark.
- Crataegus artzachensis Gabrielian & Sargsyan
- Crataegus ashei Beadle
- Crataegus asperifolia Sarg.
- Crataegus × atrorubens Ashe
- Crataegus atrovirens J.B.Phipps & R.O'Kennon
- Crataegus attrita Beadle
- Crataegus aurantia Pojark.
- Crataegus aurescens J.B.Phipps
- Crataegus austromontana Beadle
- Crataegus azarolus L.

== B ==
- Crataegus baroussana Eggl.
- Crataegus beadlei Ashe
- Crataegus beata Sarg.
- Crataegus berberifolia Torr. & A.Gray
- Crataegus × bicknellii (Eggl.) Eggl.
- Crataegus biltmoreana Beadle
- Crataegus × bornmuelleri Zabel ex K.I.Chr. & Ziel.
- Crataegus boyntonii Beadle
- Crataegus brachyacantha Sarg. & Engelm.
- Crataegus brainerdii Sarg.
- Crataegus brazoria Sarg.
- Crataegus × brevipes Peck
- Crataegus brittonii Eggl.

== C ==
- Crataegus calpodendron (Ehrh.) Medik.
- Crataegus × canescens (J.B.Phipps) T.A.Dickinson & E.Y.Y.Lo
- Crataegus castlegarensis J.B.Phipps & R.O'Kennon
- Crataegus caucasica K.Koch
- Crataegus × chersonensis K.I.Chr.
- Crataegus chlorocarpa Lenné & K.Koch
- Crataegus chlorosarca Maxim.
- Crataegus christensenii Dönmez
- Crataegus chrysocarpa Ashe
- Crataegus chungtienensis W.W.Sm.
- Crataegus × cispontica Ufimov
- Crataegus clarkei Hook.f.
- Crataegus coccinea L.
- Crataegus coccinioides Ashe
- Crataegus cognata Sarg.
- Crataegus × cogswellii K.I.Chr. & T.A.Dickinson
- Crataegus coleae Sarg.
- Crataegus × collicola Ashe
- Crataegus collina Chapm.
- Crataegus colonica Beadle
- Crataegus compacta Sarg.
- Crataegus condigna Beadle
- Crataegus coriifolia Sharifnia & Zarrink.
- Crataegus corusca Sarg.
- Crataegus crocea Beadle
- Crataegus crus-galli L.
- Crataegus cuneata Siebold & Zucc.
- Crataegus cupressocollina J.B.Phipps & R.O'Kennon
- Crataegus cuprina J.B.Phipps

== D ==
- Crataegus × daghestanica Gladkova
- Crataegus dahurica (Dieck) Koehne
- Crataegus delawarensis Sarg.
- Crataegus × desueta Sarg.
- Crataegus dispar Beadle
- Crataegus × disperma Ashe
- Crataegus × dispessa Ashe
- Crataegus distincta Kruschke
- Crataegus dodgei Ashe
- Crataegus douglasii Lindl.
- Crataegus drepanensis Raimondo, P.Marino & Scuderi
- Crataegus dsungarica Zabel ex Lange
- Crataegus dzhairensis Vassilcz.

== E ==
- Crataegus egens Beadle
- Crataegus egglestonii Sarg.
- Crataegus enderbyensis J.B.Phipps & R.O'Kennon
- Crataegus erythrocarpa Ashe
- Crataegus erythropoda Ashe

== F ==
- Crataegus fecunda Sarg.
- Crataegus ferganensis Pojark.
- Crataegus flabellata (Bosc ex Spach) K.Koch
- Crataegus flava Aiton
- Crataegus flavida Sarg.
- Crataegus florens Beadle
- Crataegus floridana Sarg.
- Crataegus florifera Sarg.
- Crataegus fluviatilis Sarg.
- Crataegus forbesiae Sarg.
- Crataegus formosa Sarg.
- Crataegus × fretalis Sarg.
- Crataegus furtiva Beadle

== G ==
- Crataegus gattingeri Ashe
- Crataegus gaylussacia A.Heller
- Crataegus germanica (L.) Kuntze
- Crataegus glareosa Ashe
- Crataegus granatensis Boiss.
- Crataegus grandifolia J.B.Phipps
- Crataegus greggiana Eggl.
- Crataegus gregorianii Gabrieljan & Sargsyan
- Crataegus grossidentata Sharifnia & K.I.Chr.

== H ==
- Crataegus harbisonii Beadle
- Crataegus hatamii Hamzehee, K.I.Chr. & Attar
- Crataegus heldreichii Boiss.
- Crataegus heterophylla Flüggé
- Crataegus heterophylloides Pojark. ex K.I.Chr.
- Crataegus hissarica Pojark.
- Crataegus holmesiana Ashe
- Crataegus × hudsonica Sarg.
- Crataegus hupehensis Sarg.
- Crataegus hypolasia K.Koch

== I ==
- Crataegus × ideae Sarg.
- Crataegus incaedua Sarg.
- Crataegus indicens Ashe
- Crataegus integra (Nash) Beadle
- Crataegus intricata Lange
- Crataegus invicta Beadle
- Crataegus iracunda Beadle
- Crataegus irrasa Sarg.
- Crataegus isfajramensis Pachom.

== J – K ==
- Crataegus jesupii Sarg.
- Crataegus johnstonii J.B.Phipps
- Crataegus jonesiae Sarg.
- Crataegus kansuensis E.H.Wilson
- Crataegus karadaghensis Pojark.
- Crataegus keepii Sarg.
- Crataegus keeslingii Witsell & Lance
- Crataegus kelloggii Sarg.
- Crataegus × kennedyi Sarg.
- Crataegus khatamsazae Hamzehee, K.I.Chr. & Attar
- Crataegus × killinica K.I.Chr.
- Crataegus knorringiana Pojark.
- Crataegus kurdistanica Hadač & Chrtek
- Crataegus × kyrtostyla Fingerh.

== L ==
- Crataegus laciniata Ucria
- Crataegus lacrimata Small
- Crataegus laevigata (Poir.) DC.
- Crataegus × lambertiana Lange
- Crataegus lanata Beadle
- Crataegus lancei J.B.Phipps
- Crataegus × laneyi Sarg.
- Crataegus lanuginosa Sarg.
- Crataegus lassa Beadle
- Crataegus latebrosa Sarg.
- Crataegus laurentiana Sarg.
- Crataegus lepida Beadle
- Crataegus levis Sarg.
- Crataegus longipes Pojark.
- Crataegus lucorum Sarg.
- Crataegus lumaria Ashe

== M ==
- Crataegus macracantha (Lindl.) Lodd. ex Loudon
- Crataegus × macrocarpa Hegetschw.
- Crataegus macrosperma Ashe
- Crataegus magniflora Sarg.
- Crataegus × maligna Sarg.
- Crataegus margaretta Ashe
- Crataegus maximowiczii C.K.Schneid.
- Crataegus × media Bechst.
- Crataegus menandiana Sarg.
- Crataegus mendosa Beadle
- Crataegus meridiana Beadle
- Crataegus mexicana Moc. & Sessé ex DC.
- Crataegus meyeri Pojark.
- Crataegus microphylla K.Koch
- Crataegus mollis (Torr. & A.Gray) Scheele
- Crataegus monogyna Jacq.
- Crataegus munda Beadle

== N ==
- Crataegus nananixonii J.B.Phipps & R.O'Kennon
- Crataegus necopinata Pojark.
- Crataegus nelsonii Eggl.
- Crataegus neobushii Sarg.
- Crataegus nigra Waldst. & Kit.
- Crataegus × ninae-celottiae K.I.Chr. & T.A.Dickinson
- Crataegus nitida (Engelm. ex Britton & N.E.Br.) Sarg.
- Crataegus nitidula Sarg.
- Crataegus × notha Sarg.

== O ==
- Crataegus oakesiana Eggl.
- Crataegus okanaganensis J.B.Phipps & R.O'Kennon
- Crataegus okennonii J.B.Phipps
- Crataegus opaca Hook. & Arn.
- Crataegus opima Beadle
- Crataegus opulens Sarg.
- Crataegus orbicularis J.B.Phipps & R.O'Kennon
- Crataegus oreophila Lance
- Crataegus oresbia W.W.Sm.
- Crataegus orientalis Pall. ex M.Bieb.
- Crataegus ouachitensis E.J.Palmer

== P ==
- Crataegus padifolia Sarg.
- Crataegus pallasii Griseb.
- Crataegus pamiroalaica Zaprjagaeva
- Crataegus pearsonii Ashe
- Crataegus × peloponnesiaca Byatt
- Crataegus pennsylvanica Ashe
- Crataegus pentagyna Waldst. & Kit. ex Willd.
- Crataegus pequotorum Sarg.
- Crataegus persimilis Sarg.
- Crataegus petrodavisii Dönmez
- Crataegus pexa Beadle
- Crataegus phaenopyrum (L.f.) Medik.
- Crataegus phippsii O'Kennon
- Crataegus × pilosa Sarg.
- Crataegus pinnatifida Bunge
- Crataegus pisifera Sarg.
- Crataegus pontica K.Koch
- Crataegus × poplavskae Tzvelev
- Crataegus populnea Ashe
- Crataegus porteri Britton
- Crataegus pringlei Sarg.
- Crataegus prona Ashe
- Crataegus pruinosa (H.L.Wendl.) K.Koch
- Crataegus × pseudoazarolus Popov
- Crataegus pseudoheterophylla Pojark.
- Crataegus pseudosanguinea Popov ex Pojark.
- Crataegus × puberis Sarg.
- Crataegus pulcherrima Ashe
- Crataegus pulla Beadle
- Crataegus punctata Jacq.
- Crataegus purpurella J.B.Phipps & R.O'Kennon
- Crataegus putata Sarg.
- Crataegus pycnoloba Boiss. & Heldr.

== Q - R ==
- Crataegus quaesita Beadle
- Crataegus × radnoti-gyarmatii Ker.-Nagy
- Crataegus ravida Ashe
- Crataegus remotilobata Raikova ex Popov
- Crataegus reverchonii Sarg.
- Crataegus rhipidophylla Gand.
- Crataegus rhodamae-loveae T.A.Dickinson
- Crataegus rivularis Nutt.
- Crataegus rivuloadamensis J.B.Phipps & R.O'Kennon
- Crataegus rivulopugnensis J.B.Phipps & R.O'Kennon
- Crataegus roribacca Ashe
- Crataegus rosei Eggl.
- Crataegus rubella Beadle
- Crataegus rubribracteolata J.B.Phipps & R.O'Kennon
- Crataegus × rubrinervis Lange
- Crataegus × rubrocarnea Sarg.
- Crataegus × rufula Sarg.
- Crataegus × rupicola Sarg.
- Crataegus × ruscinonensis Gren. & Blanc
- Crataegus russanovii Cinovskis

== S ==
- Crataegus sakranensis Hadač & Chrtek
- Crataegus saligna Greene
- Crataegus sanguinea Pall.
- Crataegus sargentii Beadle
- Crataegus scabrida Sarg.
- Crataegus scabrifolia (Franch.) Rehder
- Crataegus schizophylla Eggl.
- Crataegus schuettei Ashe
- Crataegus senta Beadle
- Crataegus shandongensis F.Z.Li & W.D.Peng
- Crataegus sheila-phippsiae J.B.Phipps & R.O'Kennon
- Crataegus shensiensis Pojark.
- Crataegus sheridana A.Nelson
- Crataegus shinnersii Kruschke
- Crataegus shuswapensis J.B.Phipps & R.O'Kennon
- Crataegus silvestris Sarg.
- Crataegus × simulata Sarg.
- Crataegus × sinaica Boiss.
- Crataegus songarica K.Koch
- Crataegus sororia Beadle
- Crataegus spathulata Michx.
- Crataegus × spatiosa Sarg.
- Crataegus spes-aestatum J.B.Phipps
- Crataegus sphaenophylla Pojark.
- Crataegus spissa Sarg.
- Crataegus stankovii Kossych
- Crataegus stevenii Pojark.
- Crataegus stonei Sarg.
- Crataegus subheterophylla P.D.Sell
- Crataegus submollis Sarg.
- Crataegus suborbiculata Sarg.
- Crataegus succulenta Schrad. ex Link
- Crataegus suksdorfii (Sarg.) Kruschke
- Crataegus sulfurea J.B.Phipps

== T ==
- Crataegus talyschensis Pojark. ex Ufimov
- Crataegus tanacetifolia (Poir.) Pers.
- Crataegus tanuphylla Sarg.
- Crataegus taurica Pojark.
- Crataegus tenuior J.B.Phipps
- Crataegus teres Beadle
- Crataegus texana Buckley
- Crataegus theodori Essenova
- Crataegus thermopegaea E.J.Palmer
- Crataegus tianschanica Pojark.
- Crataegus tinctoria Ashe
- Crataegus tkatschenkoi K.I.Chr.
- Crataegus tracyi Ashe ex Eggl.
- Crataegus triflora Chapm.
- Crataegus turkestanica Pojark.
- Crataegus turnerorum Enquist
- Crataegus tzvelevii Ufimov

== U – V ==
- Crataegus umbratilis Sarg.
- Crataegus uniflora Münchh.
- Crataegus ursopedensis J.B.Phipps & R.O'Kennon
- Crataegus × vailiae Britton
- Crataegus vegeta Sarg.
- Crataegus venusta Beadle
- Crataegus vicana Beadle
- Crataegus viridis L.

== W ==
- Crataegus warneri Sarg.
- Crataegus wattiana Hemsl. & Lace
- Crataegus whitakeri Sarg.
- Crataegus wilsonii Sarg.
- Crataegus wootoniana Eggl.

== Y – Z ==
- Crataegus yaltirikii Dönmez
- Crataegus × yosgatica K.I.Chr.
- Crataegus zagrica Khat.
- Crataegus × zangezura Pojark.
- Crataegus zichichii Raimondo, Spadaro & Venturella
