= Crataegus iracunda =

Conservation status
- Least Concern (IUCN 3.1)

Scientific classification
- Kingdom: Plantae
- Clade: Tracheophytes
- Clade: Angiosperms
- Clade: Eudicots
- Clade: Rosids
- Order: Rosales
- Family: Rosaceae
- Genus: Crataegus
- Section: Crataegus sect. Coccineae
- Series: Crataegus ser. Tenuifoliae
- Species: C. iracunda

Binomial name
- Crataegus iracunda Beadle

Synonyms
- C. drymophila Sarg.; C. iracunda var. silvicola E. J. Palmer

Species of hawthorn

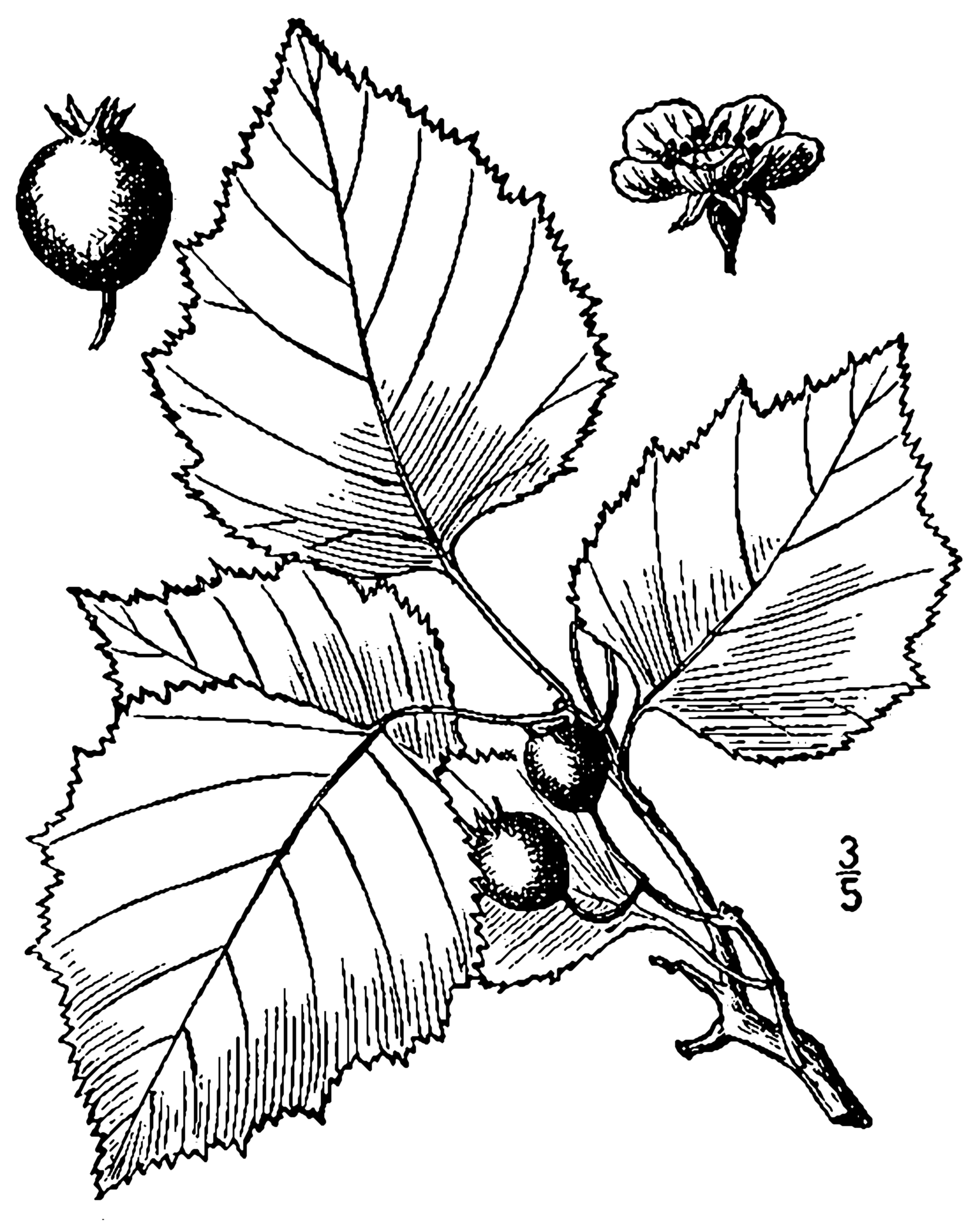

Crataegus iracunda, with common name passionate hawthorn, and sometimes called the stolon-bearing hawthorn is a North American species of hawthorn. It was described in 1899 by Chauncey Delos Beadle of the Biltmore Herbarium (Biltmore Estate) in North Carolina. Taxonomic opinions have differed about this species, and to complicate matters Crataegus macrosperma and various species of C. series Populneae have frequently been misidentified as C. iracunda, leading to differing statements about its geographic range. The 2015 Flora of North America considers its range to be in the southeastern U.S., restricted to the US states of Alabama, Georgia, Louisiana, Mississippi, North Carolina, South Carolina, and Virginia.

Crataegus iracunda is a branching shrub or small tree rarely more than 6 meters (20 feet) in height, sprouting from the roots and thus forming large thickets. Leaves are egg-shaped, pointed at the tips, with teeth along the edges. Flowers come in flat-topped arrays. Fruit is red or orange, sometimes with green blotches.

Varieties within the species have been defined, for example:

- C. iracunda var. iracunda, with synonyms:
  - C. drymophila Sarg.
  - C. silvicola Beadle
  - C. maineana Sarg.
- C. iracunda var. stolonifera (Sarg.) Kruschke, with synonyms:
  - C. stolonifera Sarg.
  - C. demissa Sarg.
- C. iracunda var. populnea (Ashe) Kruschke, with synonyms:
  - C. populnea Ashe
  - C. marcida Ashe
  - C. perlaeta Sarg.
  - C. delectata Sarg.
- C. iracunda var. brumalis (Ashe) Kruschke, with synonym:
  - C. brumalis Ashe
- C. iracunda var. diffusa (Sarg.) Kruschke, with synonyms:
  - C. diffusa Sarg.
  - C. beckwithae Sarg.
  - C. uncta Sarg.
