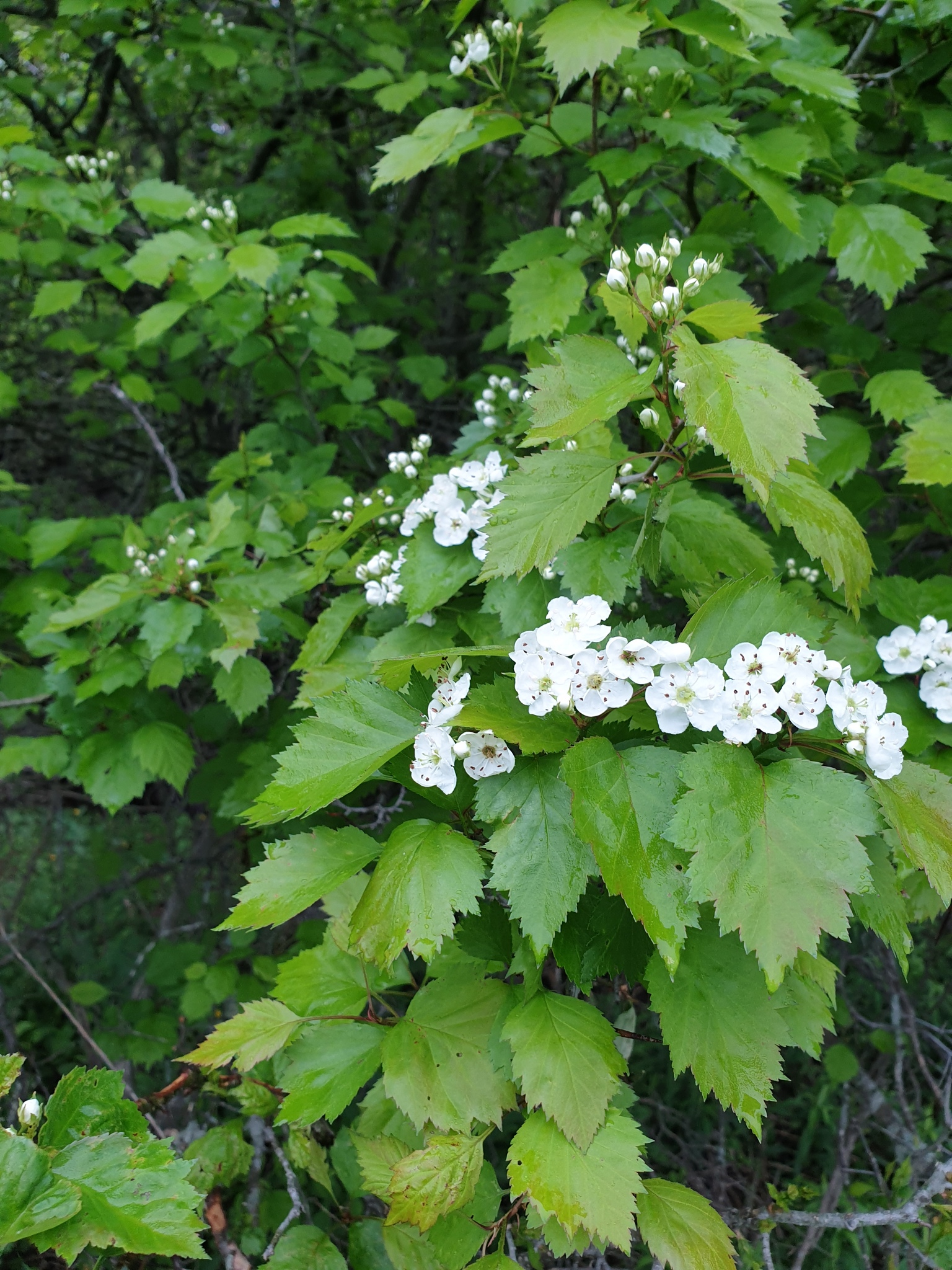

Scientific classification
- Kingdom: Plantae
- Clade: Tracheophytes
- Clade: Angiosperms
- Clade: Eudicots
- Clade: Rosids
- Order: Rosales
- Family: Rosaceae
- Genus: Crataegus
- Section: Crataegus sect. Coccineae
- Series: Crataegus ser. Tenuifoliae
- Species: C. fluviatilis

Binomial name
- Crataegus fluviatilis Sarg.

Synonyms
- C. apiomorpha Sarg.

= Crataegus fluviatilis =

Species of hawthorn

Crataegus fluviatilis is a species of hawthorn similar to C. flabellata and to C. macrosperma. The name C. apiomorpha has been applied to a form of the species that is most similar to C. macrosperma.
