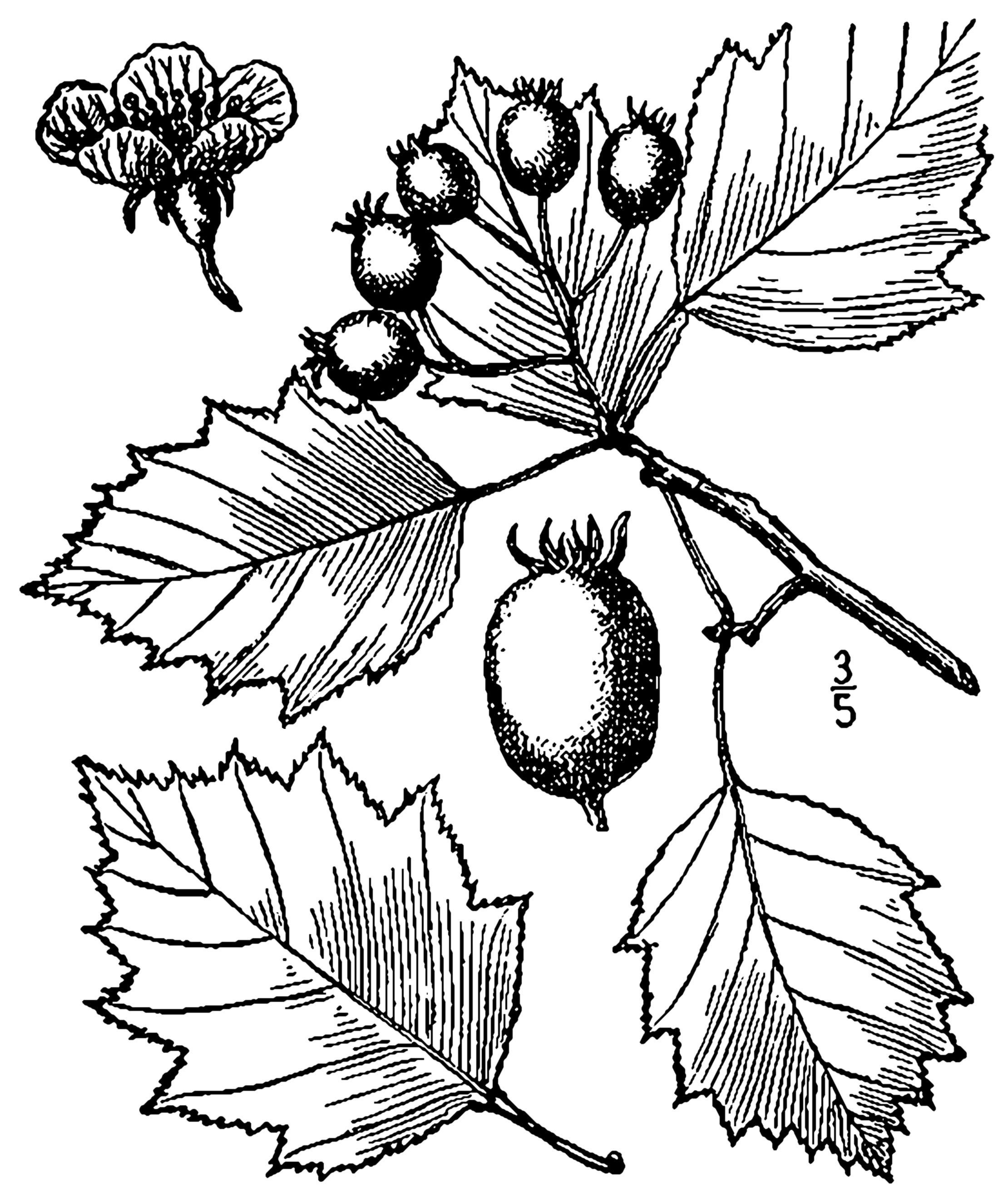
- Crataegus macrosperma

Scientific classification
- Kingdom: Plantae
- Clade: Tracheophytes
- Clade: Angiosperms
- Clade: Eudicots
- Clade: Rosids
- Order: Rosales
- Family: Rosaceae
- Genus: Crataegus
- Section: Crataegus sect. Coccineae
- Series: Crataegus ser. Tenuifoliae (Beadle ex Sarg.) Rehder

= Crataegus ser. Tenuifoliae =

Species of hawthorn

Series Tenuifoliae is a series within the genus Crataegus that contains at least seven species of hawthorn trees and shrubs, native to Eastern North America, with one disjunct species (C. wootoniana) in the mountains of New Mexico.

== Species ==
The principal species in the series are:

- Crataegus flabellata
- Crataegus schuettei
- Crataegus roribacca
- Crataegus fluviatilis
- Crataegus iracunda
- Crataegus macrosperma
- Crataegus wootoniana

The following rare local species appear to be hybrid derivatives of series Tenuifoliae:

- Crataegus × fretalis
- Crataegus × lucorum
