= Crataegus delawarensis =

Conservation status
- Possibly Extinct (NatureServe)

Scientific classification
- Kingdom: Plantae
- Clade: Tracheophytes
- Clade: Angiosperms
- Clade: Eudicots
- Clade: Rosids
- Order: Rosales
- Family: Rosaceae
- Genus: Crataegus
- Section: Crataegus sect. Coccineae
- Series: Crataegus ser. Populneae
- Species: C. delawarensis

Binomial name
- Crataegus delawarensis Sarg.

Synonyms
- Crataegus pruinosa var. delawarensis (Sarg.) E.J.Palmer

Species of hawthorn

Crataegus delawarensis, commonly known as the Delaware hawthorn was a hawthorn species endemic to northern Delaware. Crataegus delawarensis can be differentiated from other members of its series by its narrower leaf blades and yellow anthers. It was a tree-like shrub that could grow up to 30 ft. in height. There is only one known occurrence between Newport and New Castle, Delaware. Despite searches, Crataegus delawarensis has not been seen since 1903. Due to its limited range and intermediate characteristics, Crataegus delawarensis is assumed to have been of hybrid origin between Crataegus pruinosa and C. populnea.
