= Crataegus aemula =

Conservation status
- Vulnerable (IUCN 3.1)

Scientific classification
- Kingdom: Plantae
- Clade: Tracheophytes
- Clade: Angiosperms
- Clade: Eudicots
- Clade: Rosids
- Order: Rosales
- Family: Rosaceae
- Genus: Crataegus
- Section: Crataegus sect. Coccineae
- Series: Crataegus ser. Populneae
- Species: C. aemula

Binomial name
- Crataegus aemula Beadle

Species of hawthorn

Crataegus aemula, the Rome hawthorn, is a species of hawthorn that is common in some parts of Mississippi and Georgia, and also occurs in Alabama. It is a perennial shrub or tree. Its habitats include oak flatwoods and brush.
