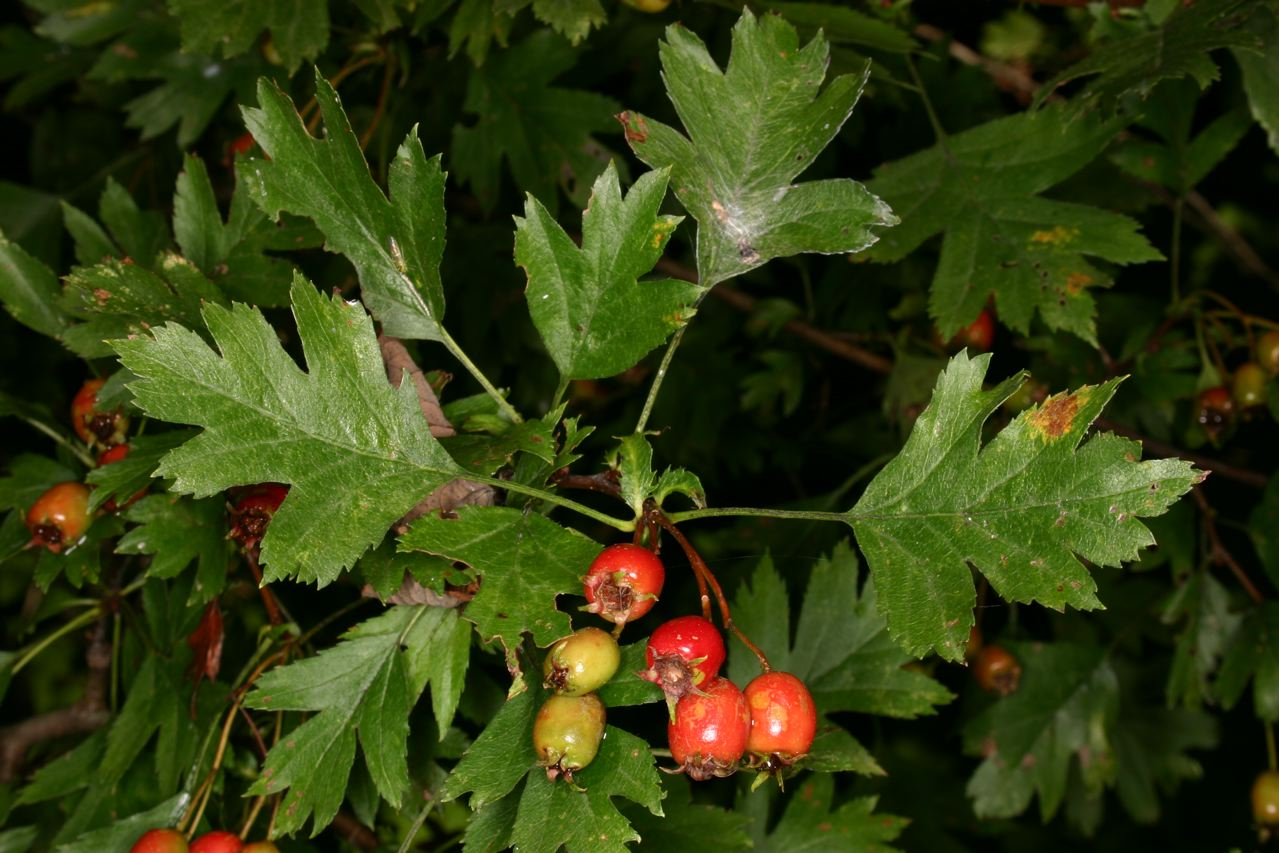

Conservation status
- Least Concern (IUCN 3.1)

Scientific classification
- Kingdom: Plantae
- Clade: Tracheophytes
- Clade: Angiosperms
- Clade: Eudicots
- Clade: Rosids
- Order: Rosales
- Family: Rosaceae
- Genus: Crataegus
- Section: Crataegus sect. Crataegus
- Series: Crataegus ser. Crataegus
- Species: C. rhipidophylla

Binomial name
- Crataegus rhipidophylla Gand.

Synonyms
- C. rosiformis Janka; C. curvisepala Lindman

= Crataegus rhipidophylla =

Species of hawthorn

Crataegus rhipidophylla is a species of hawthorn which occurs naturally from southern Scandinavia and the Baltic region to France, the Balkan Peninsula, Turkey, Caucasia, and Ukraine. It is poorly known as a landscape and garden plant, but seems to have potential for those uses.

Compared to Crataegus monogyna, C. rhipidophylla has larger flowers, larger and more colourful fruits, and more decorative foliage. It has a more or less dome-shaped crown, and it is more tolerant of shade than C. monogyna.

== Description ==
Crataegus rhipidophylla is a shrub or tree which can grow to 7 metres (23 ft) tall. Its stout thorns can be up to 1.5 cm (5/8 in) long. Leaf blades are dark green, with 2–4 pairs of acute or subacuminate lobes. A helpful characteristic trait for identification is the finely serrated lobe margin. This can help distinguish C. rhipidophylla from C. monogyna which has irregularly serrated lobe margins, with more or less coarse teeth. The basal lobes of flowering shoots leaf blades each have 6–25 teeth. Their stipules also are serrate or serrate-denticulate. Inflorescences are corymbs, 3–4.5 cm (1 1/8–1 3/4 in) long, of 5–15 lax white flowers. The hypanthium is 3–5 mm (1/8–1/4 in) long. Sepals are more or less narrowly triangular, 1–2.6 times as long as wide. There are 14–20 stamens with purple anthers. Apart from the serrated leaf blade lobe margins, the number of styles or pyrenes is a second useful characteristic trait for identification. C. rhipidophylla has flowers with 1 style (fruit with 1 pyrene), or more rarely, and at the most, 2 styles or pyrenes. This is similar to C. monogyna but unlike C. laevigata which has 2 or 3 styles or pyrenes (sometimes 1, 4 or at most 5). Fruits are either bright or dark red, 8–15 mm (3/8–5/8 in) long and 1.3–2 times as long as wide.

Flowers are in bloom in May and June. Fruits can be seen from June to October.

== Taxonomy ==
The type specimen for Crataegus rhipidophylla is a holotype named by Michel Gandoger. It was collected in 1870 at la Come, in Liergues, Rhône, France.

Despite not being one of the most common European hawthorn species, the type specimen for genus Crataegus L. is a C. rhipidophylla specimen (originally Crataegus oxyacantha L., nom. rejic.)

=== Varieties and hybrids ===
Hybrids of Crataegus rhipidophylla
Hybrid name	Other parent species
C. × browicziana K. I. Chr.	C. microphylla
C. × subsphaericea Gand.	C. monogyna
C. × macrocarpa Hegetschw.	C. laevigata

There are currently three recognized varieties:

- C. rhipidophylla Gand var. rhipidophylla
- C. rhipidophylla var. lindmanii (Hrabetová) K.I.Chr
- C. rhipidophylla var. kutahyaensis Dönmez

C. rhipidophylla var. ronnigeri (K. Malý) Janjić has been suggested to be used as a valid name for C. rhipidophylla var. lindmanii. Another synonym is Crataegus lindmanii Hrabětova

C. rhipidophylla var. lindmanii can be recognized by its erect or suberect sepals crowning the fruit.

The plant is parent to hybrids (see table). C. × macrocarpa (with C. laevigata) and C. × subsphaericea (with C. monogyna) are intermediates in terms of size and form between the parent species. C. × subsphaericea is found outside the range of its parents.

== Distribution and habitat ==
Crataegus rhipidophylla is a subatlantic species. It has a Eurasian native range, including southern Scandinavia and the Baltic region, France, the Balkan Peninsula, Asian Turkey, Caucasia, the Crimea, and Ukraine. It grows from sea level up to 1,800 m altitude.

This species grows both on limestone and granitic or volcanic rocks. It is one of the few shade-tolerant hawthorn species, growing in shaded parts of continuous forests.
