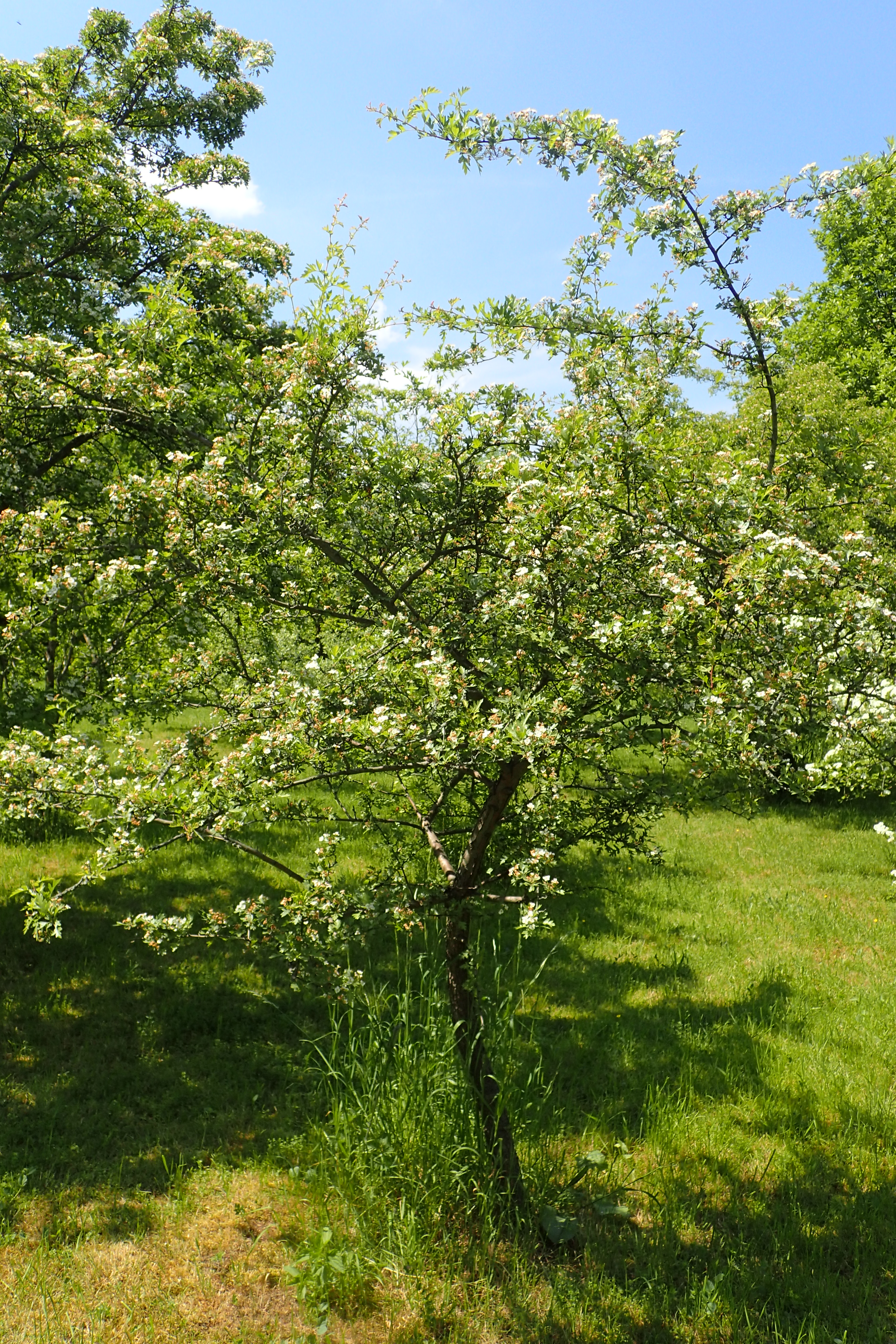

Scientific classification
- Kingdom: Plantae
- Clade: Tracheophytes
- Clade: Angiosperms
- Clade: Eudicots
- Clade: Rosids
- Order: Rosales
- Family: Rosaceae
- Genus: Crataegus
- Species: C. × sinaica

Binomial name
- Crataegus × sinaica Boiss.

= Crataegus × sinaica =

Species of hawthorn

Crataegus × sinaica is a hawthorn that originated as a hybrid between two other hawthorn species, C. azarolus in series Orientales and C. monogyna in series Crataegus. It has been placed in the nothosection Orientaegus. It grows in the central and eastern parts of the Mediterranean region on rocky mountain slopes. In Egypt it grows in the mountains near Saint Catherine in South Sinai, where it is known as za'rur or za'rur al-awdiyah.

== Chemistry ==
Gas-liquid chromatography of lipoidal matter of the seeds of C. sinaica indicated that the seeds consist mainly of a mixture of a series of n-alkanes (75.75%). Sterols only represent 7.17% of the total unsaponifiable fraction. Analysis of the fatty acids from C. sinaica as methyl esters showed that the oil is rich in unsaturated fatty acids (86.86%). The major fatty acid is linolenic acid (C18:3) representing 38.43% of the total fatty acids mixture, followed by oleic acid (C18:1) 27.53%, and linoleic acid (C18:2) 20.89%. In addition, the results revealed the presence of stearic acid (3.69%) and palmitic acid (9.45%).
