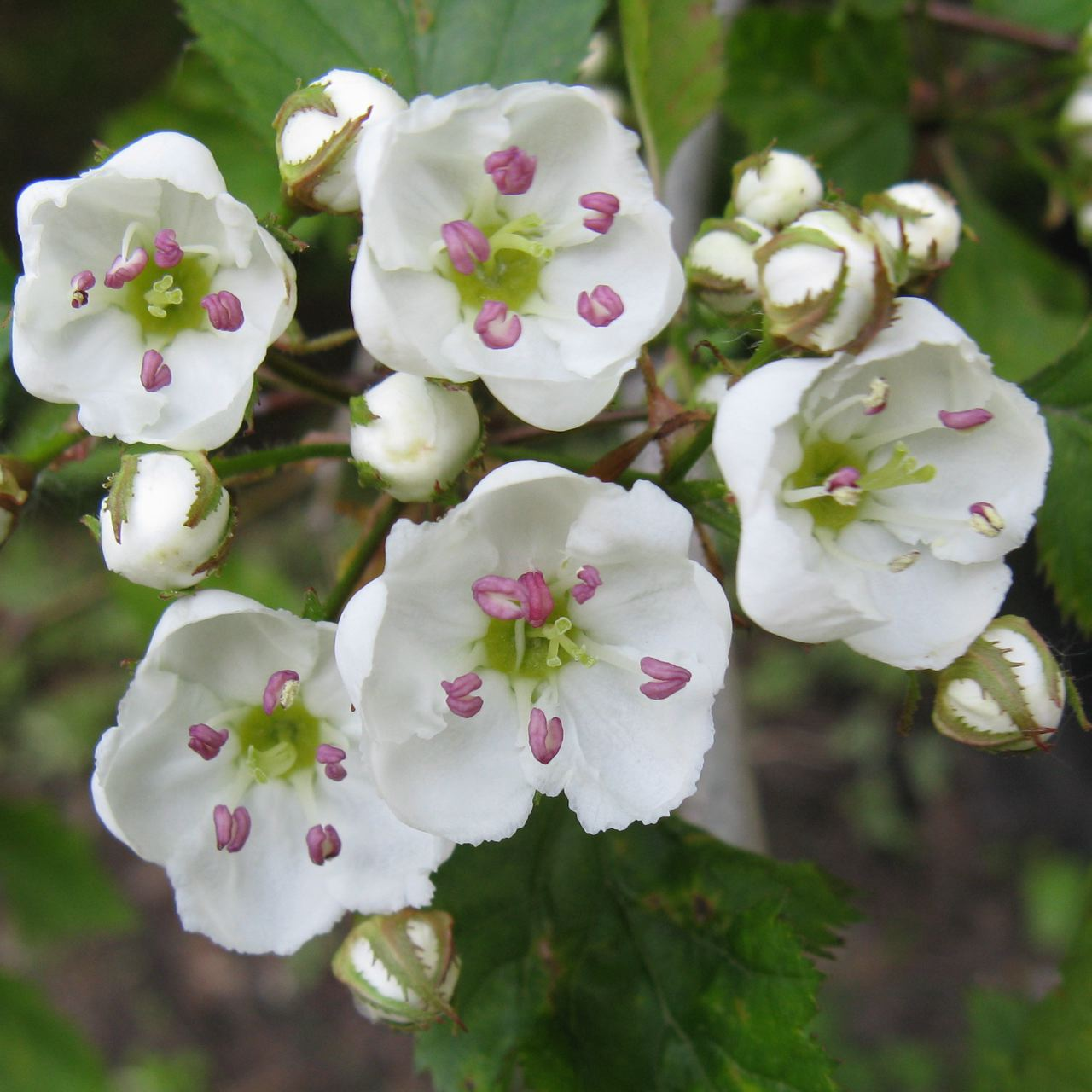

Conservation status
- Least Concern (IUCN 3.1)

Scientific classification
- Kingdom: Plantae
- Clade: Tracheophytes
- Clade: Angiosperms
- Clade: Eudicots
- Clade: Rosids
- Order: Rosales
- Family: Rosaceae
- Genus: Crataegus
- Section: Crataegus sect. Coccineae
- Series: Crataegus ser. Coccineae
- Species: C. holmesiana

Binomial name
- Crataegus holmesiana Ashe

= Crataegus holmesiana =

Species of hawthorn

Crataegus holmesiana is a species of hawthorn. It is closely related to the scarlet hawthorn, but with more elongated fruit and leaves.
