= Crataegus biltmoreana =

Scientific classification
- Kingdom: Plantae
- Clade: Tracheophytes
- Clade: Angiosperms
- Clade: Eudicots
- Clade: Rosids
- Order: Rosales
- Family: Rosaceae
- Genus: Crataegus
- Section: Crataegus sect. Coccineae
- Series: Crataegus ser. Intricatae
- Species: C. biltmoreana

Binomial name
- Crataegus biltmoreana Beadle

Species of hawthorn

Crataegus biltmoreana is a species of hawthorn. It is wide-ranging but somewhat scarce, known from Vermont to Georgia and west to Missouri and Arkansas, but is most abundant in Appalachia. It is one of many hawthorn species named by Chauncey Delos Beadle when he worked at the Biltmore Estate. The fruit are green, yellow, or orange. It is sometimes considered to be a synonym of C. intricata.

== See also ==
- List of hawthorn species with yellow fruit
