= Crataegus ucrainica =

Scientific classification
- Kingdom: Plantae
- Clade: Tracheophytes
- Clade: Angiosperms
- Clade: Eudicots
- Clade: Rosids
- Order: Rosales
- Family: Rosaceae
- Subtribe: Malinae
- Genus: Crataegus
- Species: C. ucrainica

Binomial name
- Crataegus ucrainica Pojark.

Putative species of plant

Crataegus ucrainica is a putative species of hawthorn found in Ukraine. A 2014 molecular and morphological study reduced it to a synonym of Crataegus meyeri.
