= Crataegus boyntonii =

Scientific classification
- Kingdom: Plantae
- Clade: Tracheophytes
- Clade: Angiosperms
- Clade: Eudicots
- Clade: Rosids
- Order: Rosales
- Family: Rosaceae
- Genus: Crataegus
- Section: Crataegus sect. Coccineae
- Series: Crataegus ser. Intricatae
- Species: C. boyntonii

Binomial name
- Crataegus boyntonii Beadle

Synonyms
- Crataegus buckleyi Beadle Crataegus foetida Ashe

Species of hawthorn

Crataegus boyntonii is a species of hawthorn native to the southeastern United States. Its fruit are "yellow-green flushed with red". It is sometimes considered to be a synonym of Crataegus intricata.
