= Crataegus × macrocarpa =

Scientific classification
- Kingdom: Plantae
- Clade: Tracheophytes
- Clade: Angiosperms
- Clade: Eudicots
- Clade: Rosids
- Order: Rosales
- Family: Rosaceae
- Genus: Crataegus
- Section: Crataegus sect. Crataegus
- Series: Crataegus ser. Crataegus
- Species: C. × macrocarpa

Binomial name
- Crataegus × macrocarpa Hegetschw.

Synonyms
- synonyms include C. eremitagensis Raunk. C. schumacheri Raunk. C. calycina Peterm.

Species of hawthorn

Crataegus × macrocarpa, is a hybrid between two species of Crataegus (hawthorn), C. laevigata and C. rhipidophylla, both in series Crataegus. A chemotaxonomic investigation comparing flavonoid patterns in C. × macrocarpa and its putative parent species corroborated their supposed relationship. It is sometimes confused with C. × media, the hybrid between C. monogyna and C. laevigata.

Under the rules of botanical nomenclature the name C. × macrocarpa covers all intermediate forms between the two parent species, including backcrosses.

Its fruit persists for an average of 40.6 days, and bears an average of 1.0 seeds per fruit. Fruits average 72.5% water.

== Bibliography ==
- Ehrlén, Johan; Eriksson, Ove (1991). "Phenological variation in fruit characteristics in vertebrate-dispersed plants". Oecologia. 86 (4): 463–470. doi:10.1007/BF00318311. ISSN 0029-8549.
