= Crataegus turkestanica =

Scientific classification
- Kingdom: Plantae
- Clade: Tracheophytes
- Clade: Angiosperms
- Clade: Eudicots
- Clade: Rosids
- Order: Rosales
- Family: Rosaceae
- Subtribe: Malinae
- Genus: Crataegus
- Species: C. turkestanica

Binomial name
- Crataegus turkestanica Pojark.

Synonyms
- Crataegus pseudoheterophylla subsp. turkestanica (Pojark.) K.I.Chr.

Species of flowering plant

Crataegus turkestanica, the Turkestan hawthorn, is a species of hawthorn found in Central Asia, Afghanistan and Iran. They are typically found in association with Juglans regia. Some authorities have it as a synonym of Crataegus pseudoheterophylla subsp. turkestanica.
