= Crataegus senta =

Conservation status
- Data Deficient (IUCN 3.1)

Scientific classification
- Kingdom: Plantae
- Clade: Tracheophytes
- Clade: Angiosperms
- Clade: Eudicots
- Clade: Rosids
- Order: Rosales
- Family: Rosaceae
- Subtribe: Malinae
- Genus: Crataegus
- Species: C. senta

Binomial name
- Crataegus senta Beadle

Synonyms
- List: Crataegus anisophylla Beadle; Crataegus calva Beadle; Crataegus cirrata Beadle; Crataegus colonica Beadle; Crataegus egens Beadle; Crataegus furtiva Beadle; Crataegus lancei J.B.Phipps; Crataegus laxa Beadle; Crataegus pentasperma Ashe; Crataegus pulla Beadle; Crataegus quaesita Beadle; Crataegus resima Beadle; Crataegus viaria Beadle; Crataegus yadkinensis Ashe

Species of flowering plant

Crataegus senta (common name rough hawthorn) is a putative species of hawthorn native to North Carolina. Most authorities have it as a synonym of Crataegus flava, the summer haw or yellow-fruited thorn, from which it differs by having red fruit.
