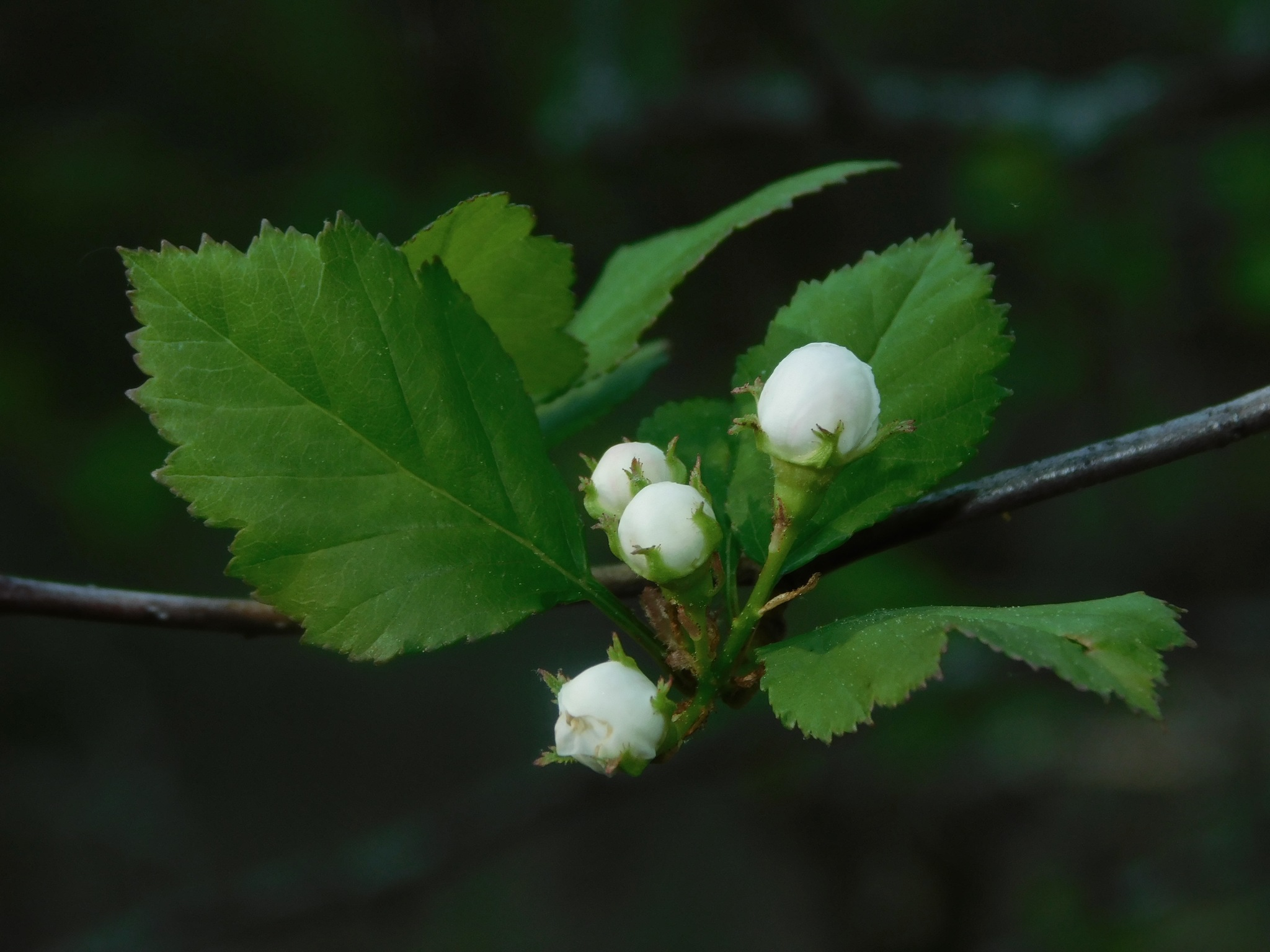

Scientific classification
- Kingdom: Plantae
- Clade: Tracheophytes
- Clade: Angiosperms
- Clade: Eudicots
- Clade: Rosids
- Order: Rosales
- Family: Rosaceae
- Genus: Crataegus
- Species: C. flava

Binomial name
- Crataegus flava Hook.

= Crataegus flava =

Species of hawthorn

Crataegus flava, common names summer haw and yellow-fruited thorn, is a species of hawthorn native to the southeastern United States from Virginia to Florida, west to Mississippi. Due to an error by Sargent the name C. flava was, and often still is, used for a different species C. lacrimata, which belongs to a different series, the Lacrimatae series. Flavae is another group of species that were thought to be related to the misidentified C. flava, and although it is now apparent that they are not related, the name of the group remains. Because the true identity of this species has only recently been discovered, the name is rarely used correctly. Individuals with red fruit occur; these have sometimes been assigned to a separate species, Crataegus senta.

Like most hawthorns, plants similar to C. flava bear edible fruit that can be used to make jellies and jams, have a flavor that is mealy and a bit dry, and grow in large clusters. Some are shaped like pears. Also like most hawthorns, the wood of C. flava is hard and can be made into small tools.

== Habitat ==
C. flava is found in upland habitats such as second growth mixed forests, open pinelands, sand pine ridges, deciduous woodlands, oak-hickory woodlands, and scrub oak woodlands. It often grows in sandy, well-drained soil. It can be found in disturbed areas such as old fields, fence rows, and right-of-ways.

== See also ==
- List of hawthorn species with yellow fruit
