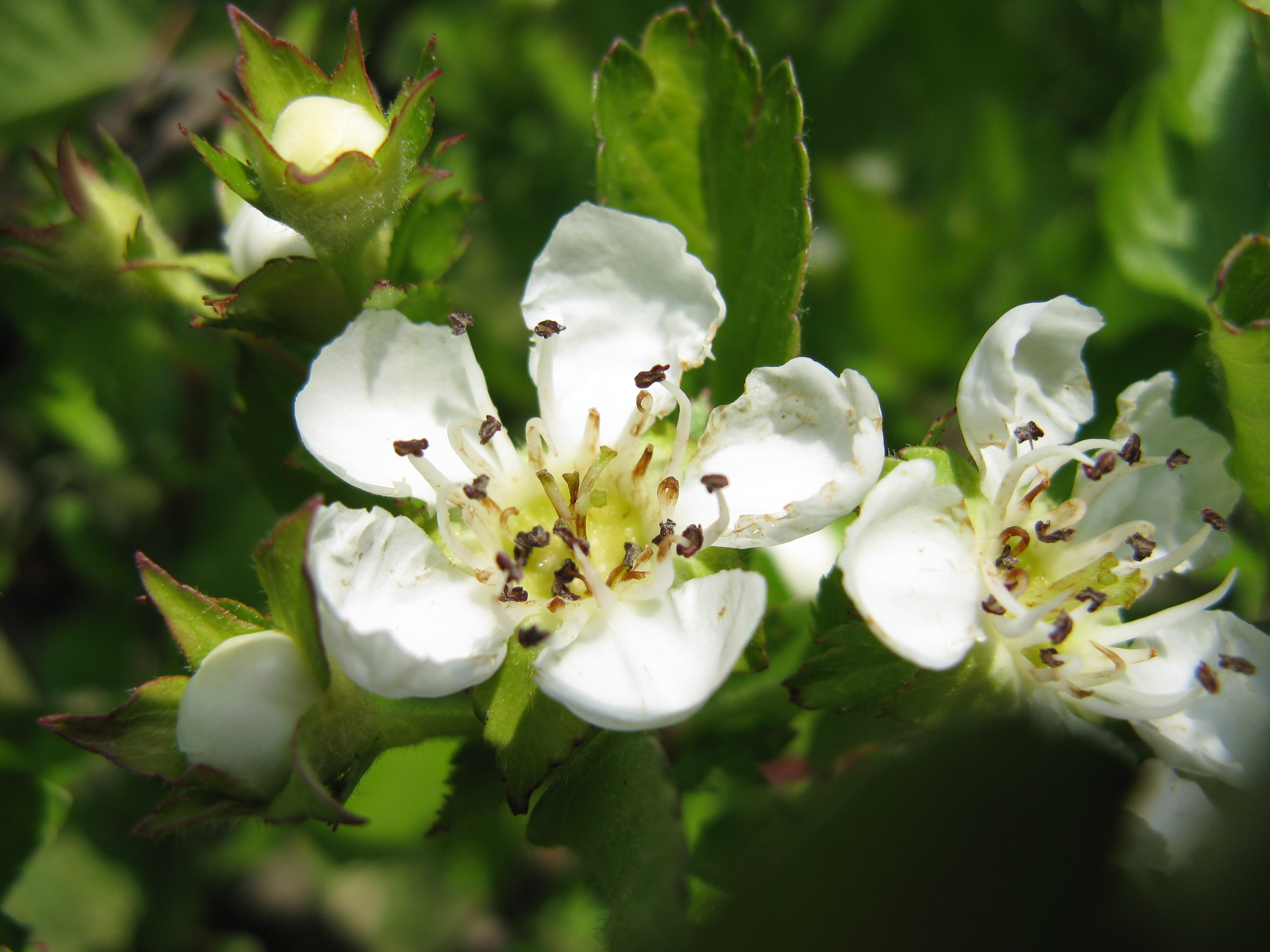

Scientific classification
- Kingdom: Plantae
- Clade: Tracheophytes
- Clade: Angiosperms
- Clade: Eudicots
- Clade: Rosids
- Order: Rosales
- Family: Rosaceae
- Genus: Crataegus
- Species: C. cuneata

Binomial name
- Crataegus cuneata Siebold & Zucc.

= Crataegus cuneata =

Species of hawthorn

Crataegus cuneata is a species of hawthorn known by the common names Chinese hawthorn (Chinese: 山楂; pinyin: Shan zha) or Japanese hawthorn. It is native to China, and is widely cultivated in Japan. It is used for bonsai. The fruit can be red or yellow. Its habitats include valleys and thickets.

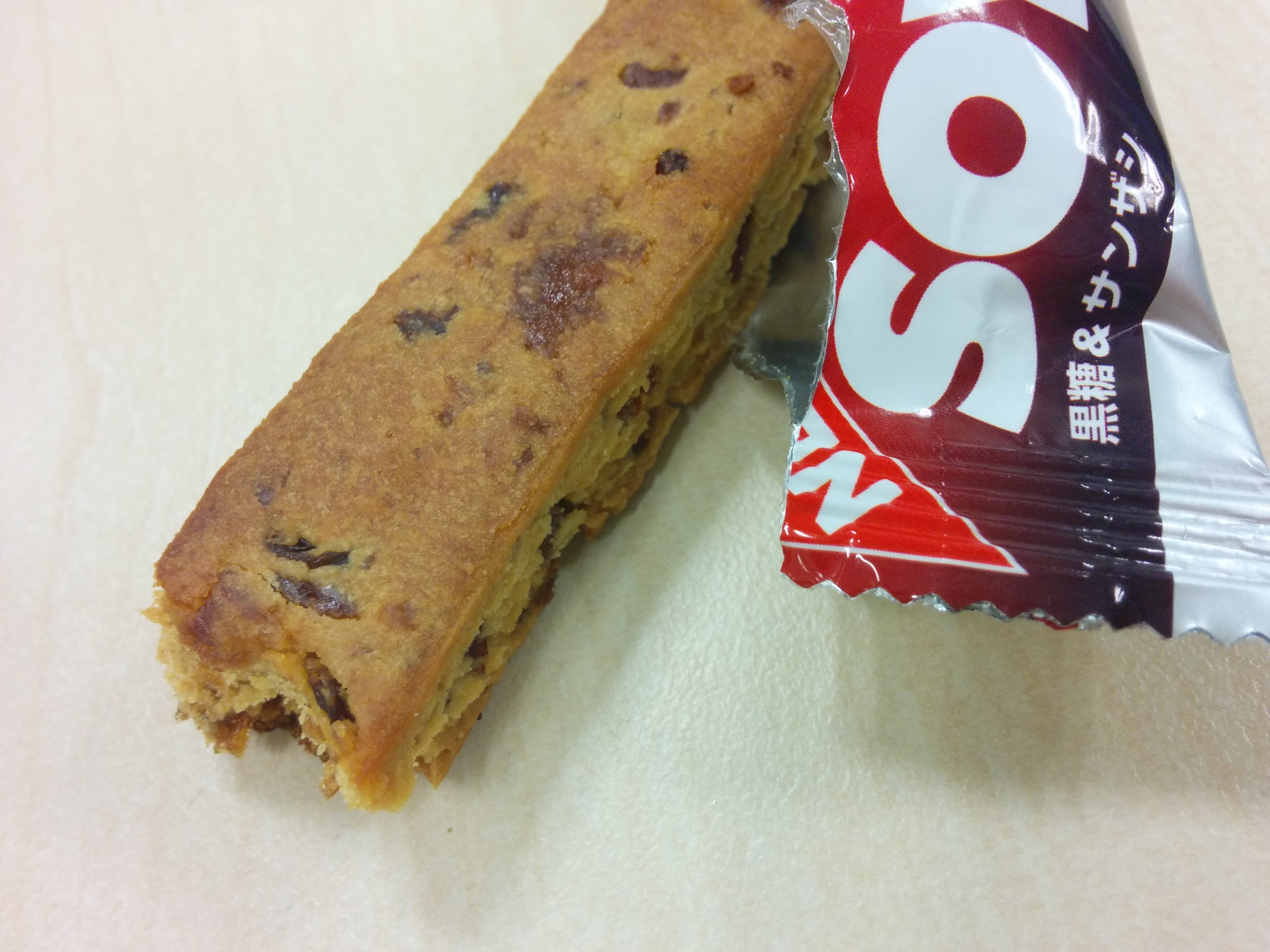
Japanese baked bar containing Crataegus cuneata

== Images ==
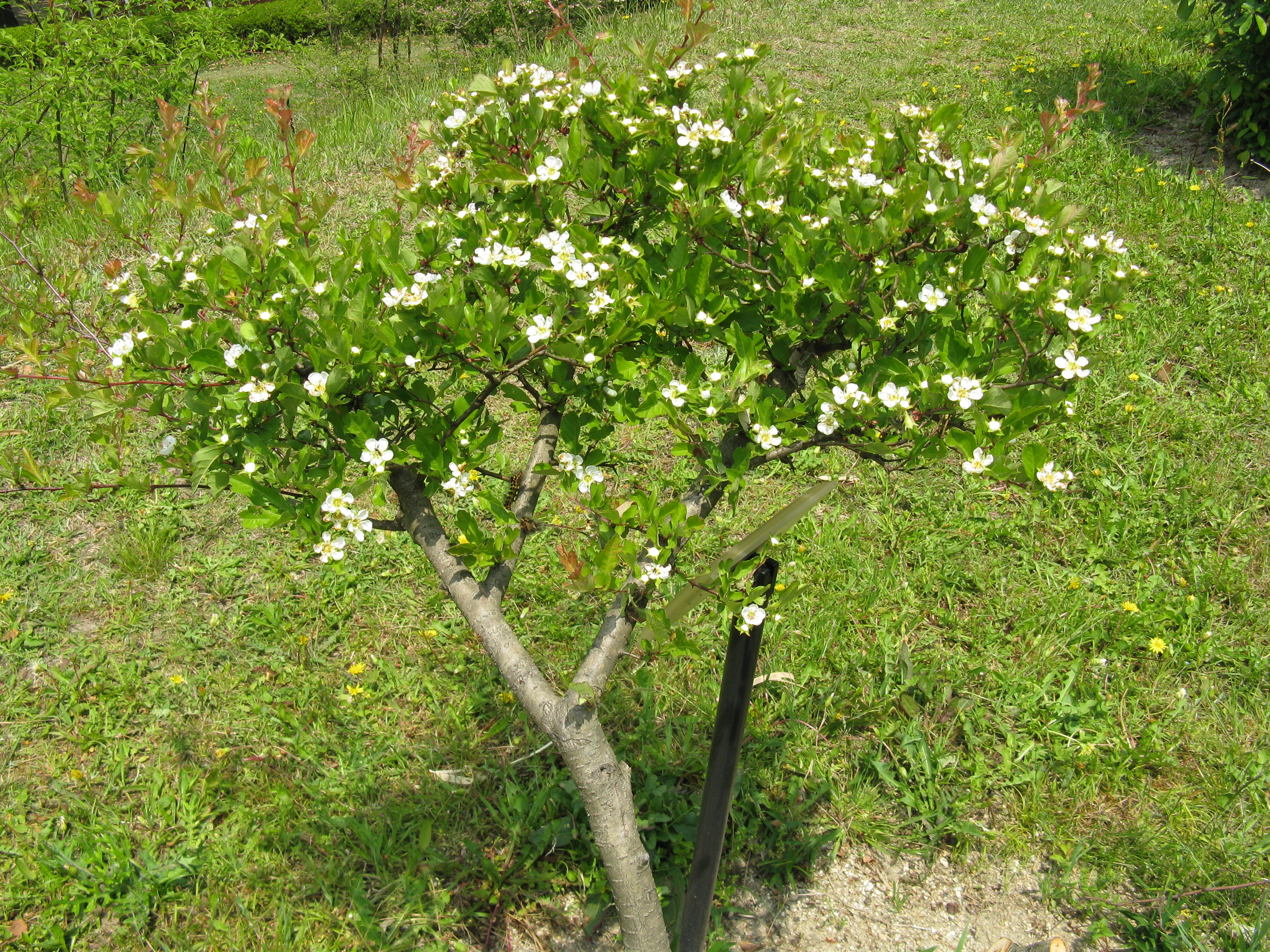
