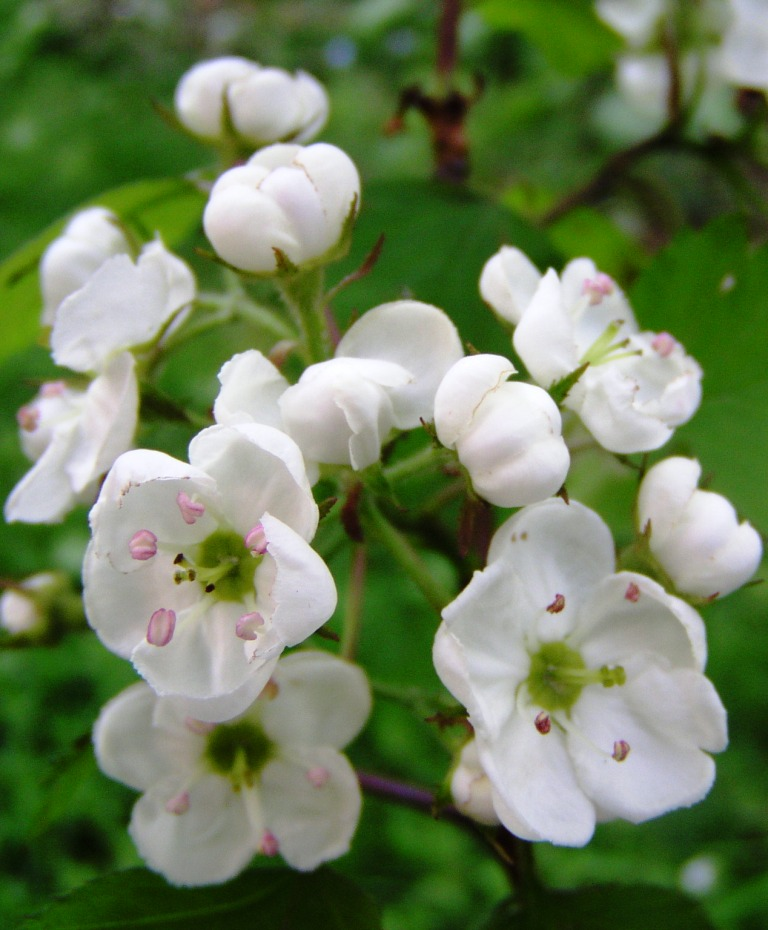

Conservation status
- Least Concern (IUCN 3.1)

Scientific classification
- Kingdom: Plantae
- Clade: Tracheophytes
- Clade: Angiosperms
- Clade: Eudicots
- Clade: Rosids
- Order: Rosales
- Family: Rosaceae
- Genus: Crataegus
- Section: Crataegus sect. Coccineae
- Series: Crataegus ser. Coccineae
- Species: C. coccinea

Binomial name
- Crataegus coccinea L.

Synonyms
- List: Crataegus acclivis Sarg.; Crataegus albicans Ashe; Crataegus assurgens Sarg.; Crataegus delecta Sarg.; Crataegus elliptica Aiton; Crataegus flava var. pubescens A.Gray; Crataegus pedicellata Sarg.; Crataegus spathulata Pursh; Crataegus uticaensis Sarg.; Crataegus virginica Lodd. ex Loudon; Mespilus elliptica (Aiton) Poir.; Phaenopyrum ellipticum (Aiton) M.Roem.; Phaenopyrum virginicum (Lodd. ex Loudon) M.Roem.

= Crataegus coccinea =

Scarlet hawthorn

Species of hawthorn

Crataegus coccinea, the scarlet hawthorn, is a species of hawthorn around which there is considerable confusion because the name has been misapplied for a long time. It has been shown to be the same as C. pedicellata, and under the rules of botanical nomenclature, the older name (C. coccinea) should be used.

== Taxonomic history ==
In 1901, Charles Sprague Sargent chose a lectotype for Crataegus coccinea from among Linnaeus's specimens, but chose a specimen that resembles C. dodgei Ashe. Sargent's lectotype opinion was followed by other authors until he realized his error and corrected it in 1909. The name C. coccinea has also been misapplied to specimens of C. intricata Lange. For almost 100 years, particularly since 1910, this species was generally called Crataegus pedicellata Sarg. except by a few authors.

Linnaeus's original description was inadequate to make a decision between various unrelated species, including C. nigra, C. phaenopyrum, and C. mollis. A component of the 2003 lectotype decision was that John Claudius Loudon had founded series Coccineae on C. coccinea, which includes C. pedicellata, to which Linnaeus's specimen 187 of the Clifford Herbarium (now at the British Museum) is considered to belong. With this taxonomy, C. pedicellata Sarg. is a heterotypic synonym of C. coccinea L.
