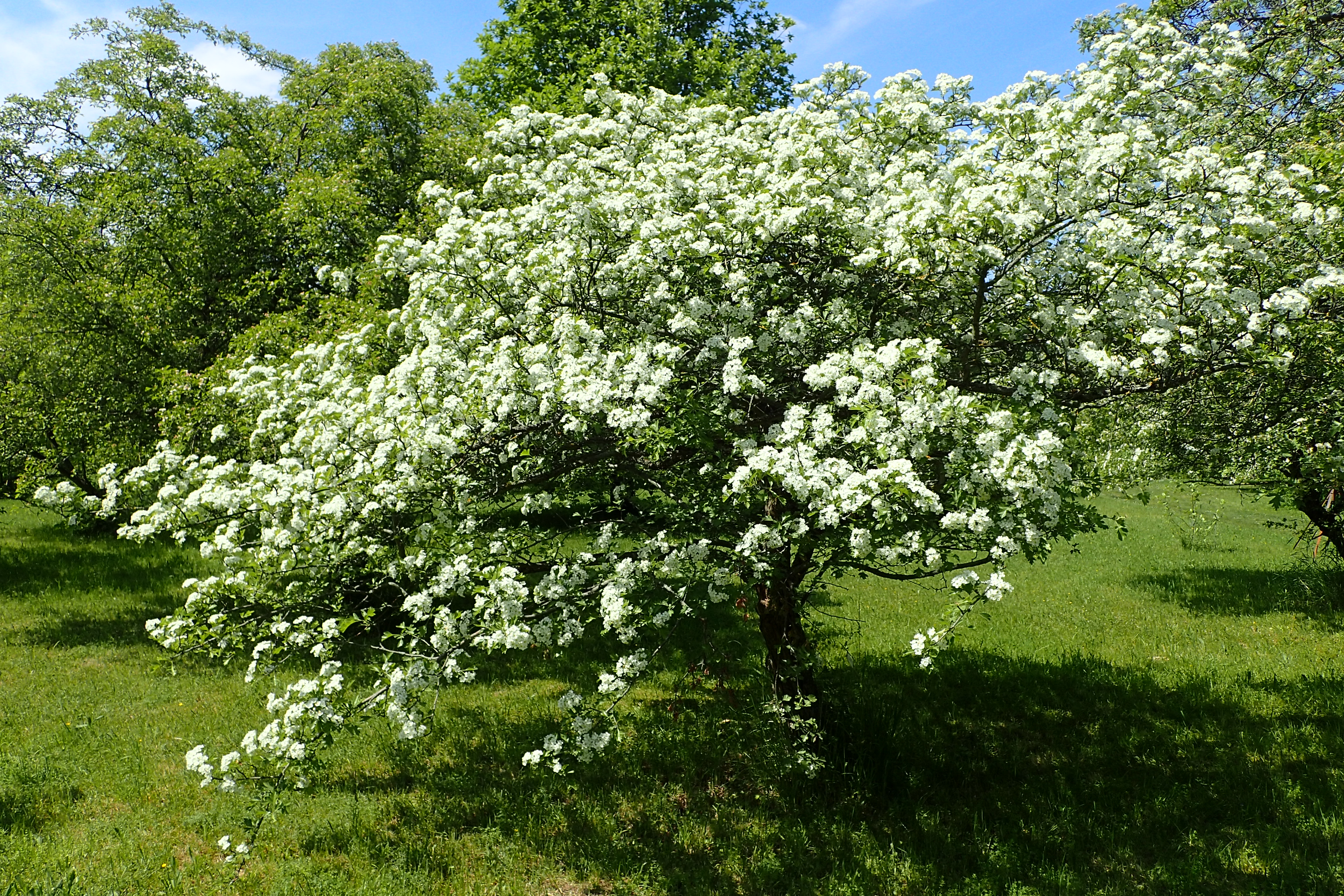
- At the Berlin Botanical Garden and Botanical Museum

Conservation status
- Data Deficient (IUCN 3.1)

Scientific classification
- Kingdom: Plantae
- Clade: Tracheophytes
- Clade: Angiosperms
- Clade: Eudicots
- Clade: Rosids
- Order: Rosales
- Family: Rosaceae
- Subtribe: Malinae
- Genus: Crataegus
- Species: C. meyeri

Binomial name
- Crataegus meyeri Pojark.

Synonyms
- List: Crataegus eriantha Pojark.; Crataegus persica Pojark.; Crataegus stankovii Kossych; Crataegus taurica Pojark.

= Crataegus meyeri =

Species of flowering plant

Crataegus meyeri is a species of hawthorn found in Belarus, European Russia, Ukraine including Crimea, Anatolia, the Transcaucasus, Iraq and Iran. Trees, they are found in scrubby areas and forest openings on drier mountain slopes, typically in association with Quercus. A 2014 molecular and morphological study reduced Crataegus ucrainica and Crataegus × yosgatica to synonyms of Crataegus meyeri.
