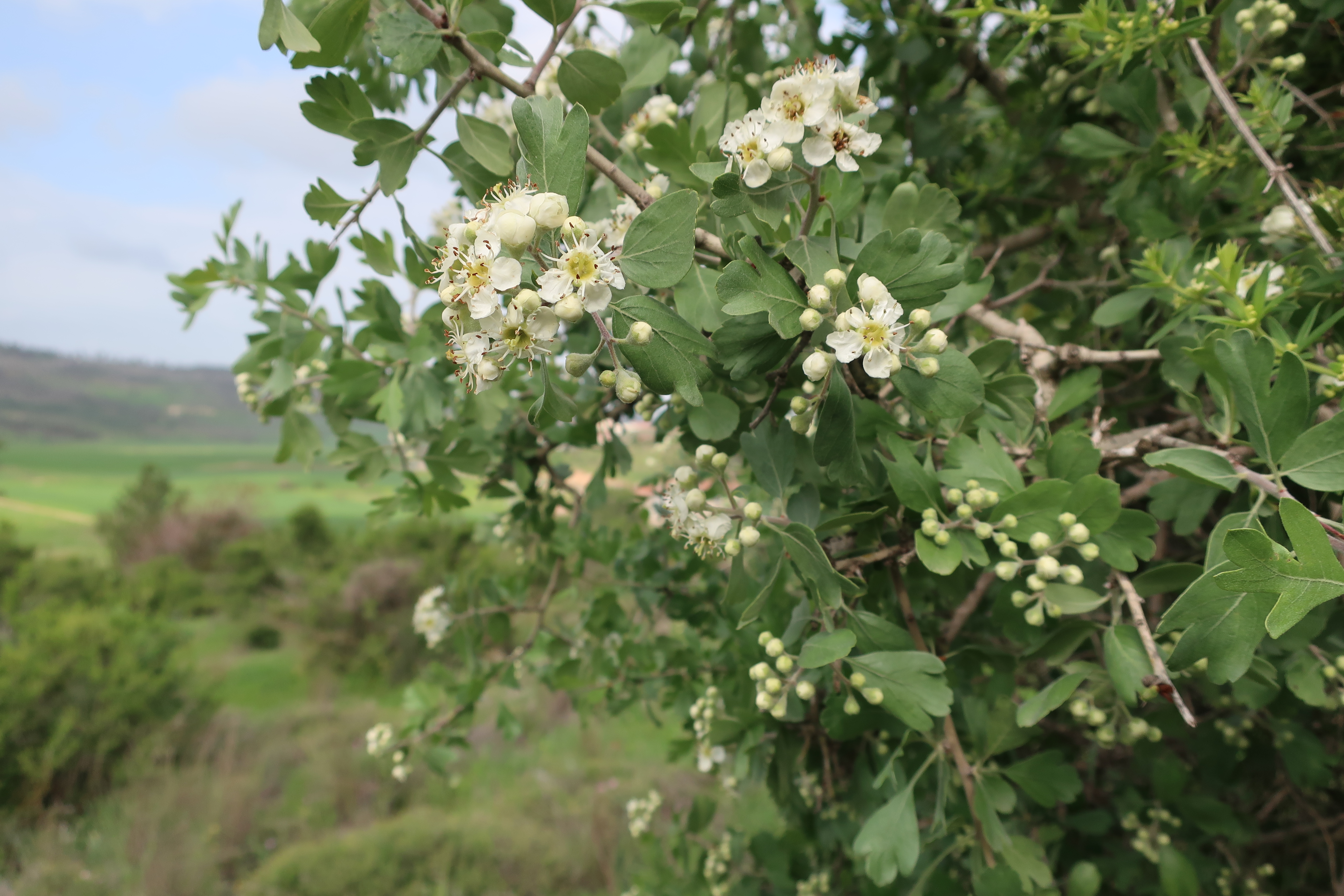
- C. azarolus var. aronia in bloom

Conservation status
- Least Concern (IUCN 3.1)

Scientific classification
- Kingdom: Plantae
- Clade: Tracheophytes
- Clade: Angiosperms
- Clade: Eudicots
- Clade: Rosids
- Order: Rosales
- Family: Rosaceae
- Genus: Crataegus
- Species: C. azarolus

Binomial name
- Crataegus azarolus L.

Synonyms
- Mespilus azarolus (L.) Duhamel; Oxyacantha azarolus (L.) Bubani; Pyrus azarolus (L.) Scop.

= Crataegus azarolus =

Mediterranean species of flowering plant

Crataegus azarolus is a species of hawthorn known by the common names azarole, azerole (from Arabic: الزُّعرُورَة, romanized: az-zu'rūra) and Mediterranean medlar. It is native to the Mediterranean Basin and is a common plant there, growing on sites comparable to those the European common hawthorn grows on. In the Arab countries it is the most common hawthorn species. When growing in the wild, the azerole bears plentiful crops of haw fruits, which are similar to the haws of the European common hawthorn, but more plump.

C. azarolus is often divided into subspecies or varieties, for example Christensen in his monograph uses four varieties:

- C. azarolus var. azarolus has orange fruit.
- C. azarolus var. aronia L., has yellowish fruit often with some red tinges
- C. azarolus var. chlorocarpa (Moris) K.I.Chr. has yellowish fruit
- C. azarolus var. pontica (K.Koch) K.I.Chr. has yellowish or orange fruit

C. azarolus has been used historically for a number of medicinal purposes.

== Gallery ==
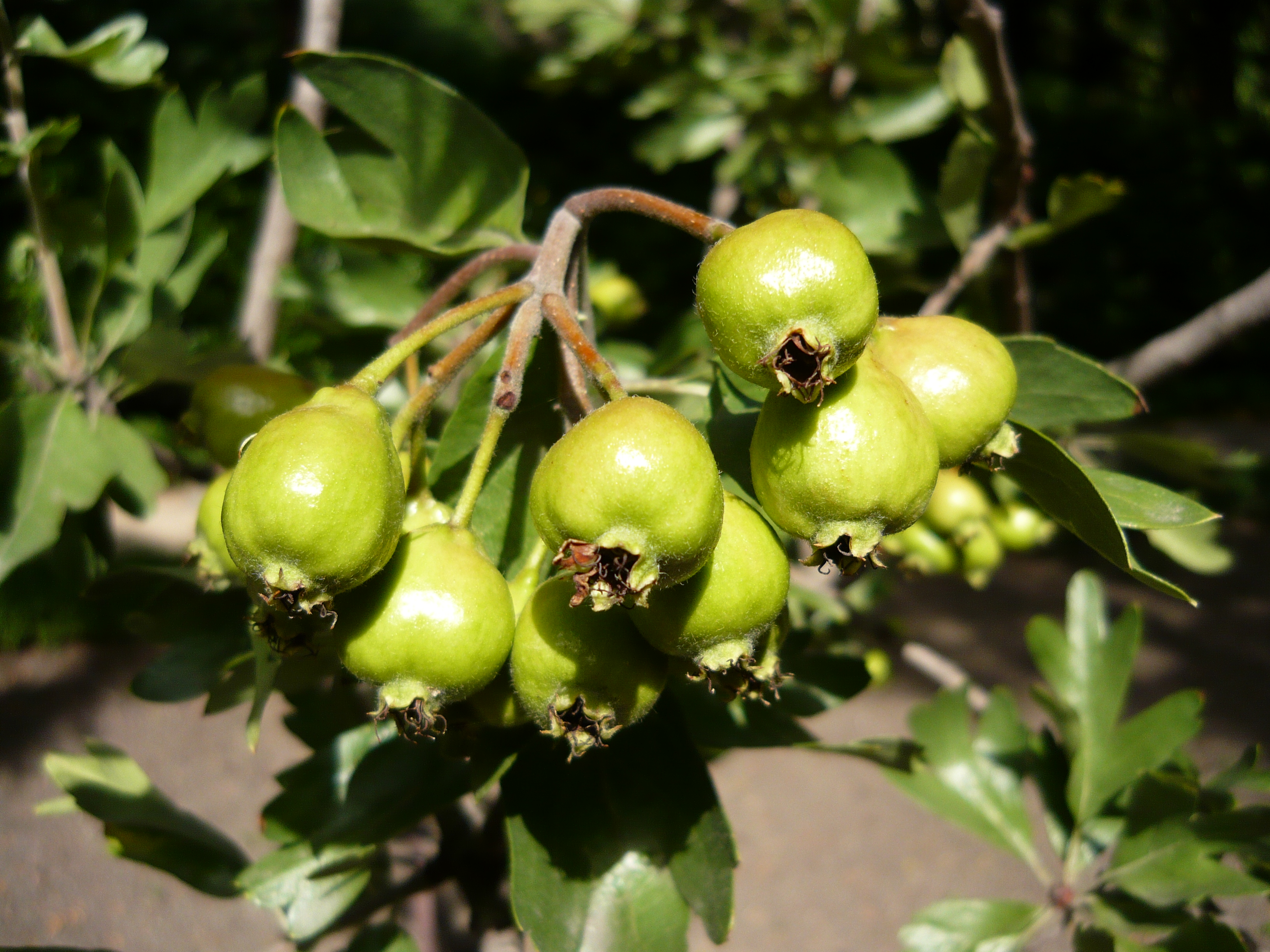
Fruit of Crataegus azarolus

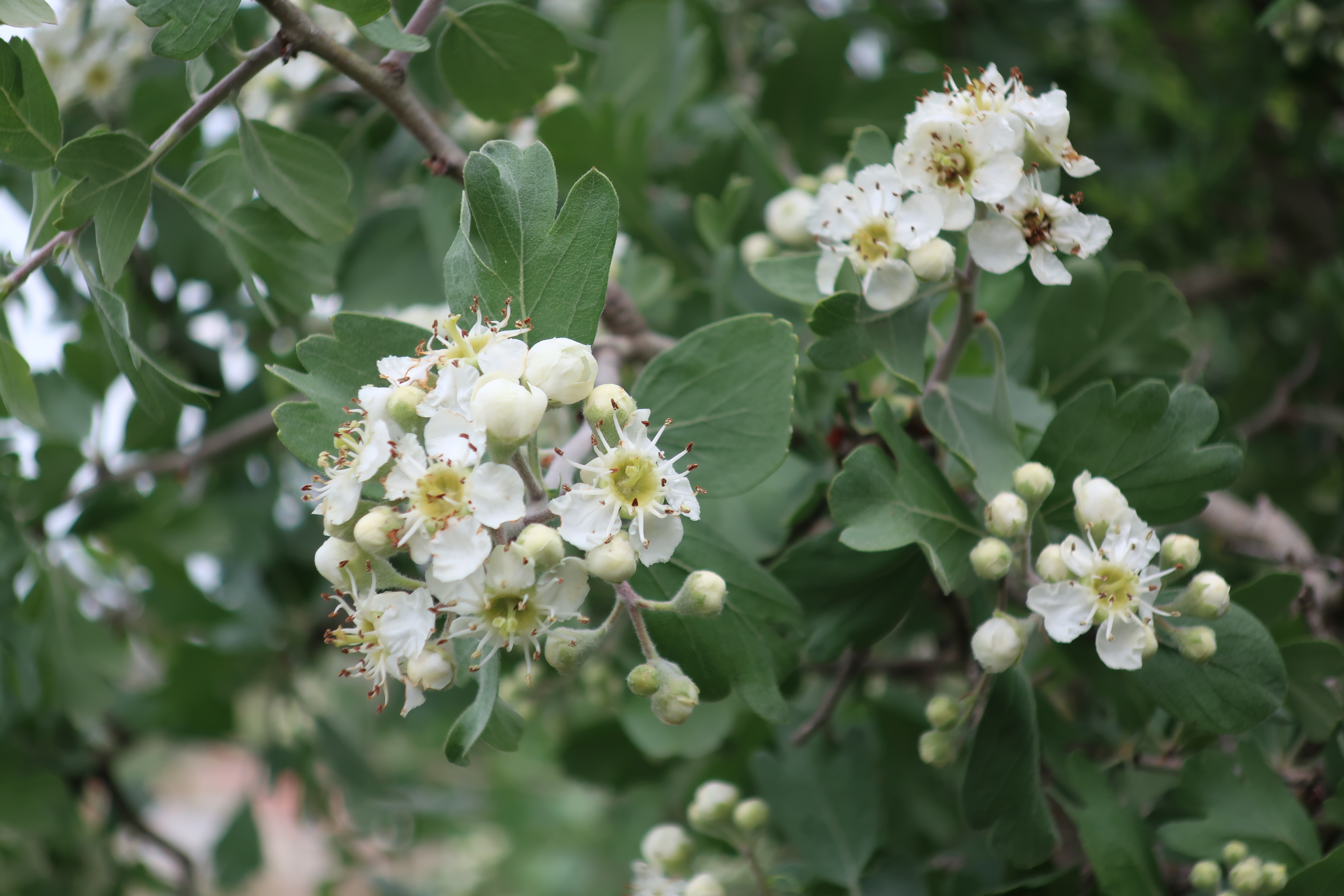
Blossoms of the Crataegus azarolus var. aronia

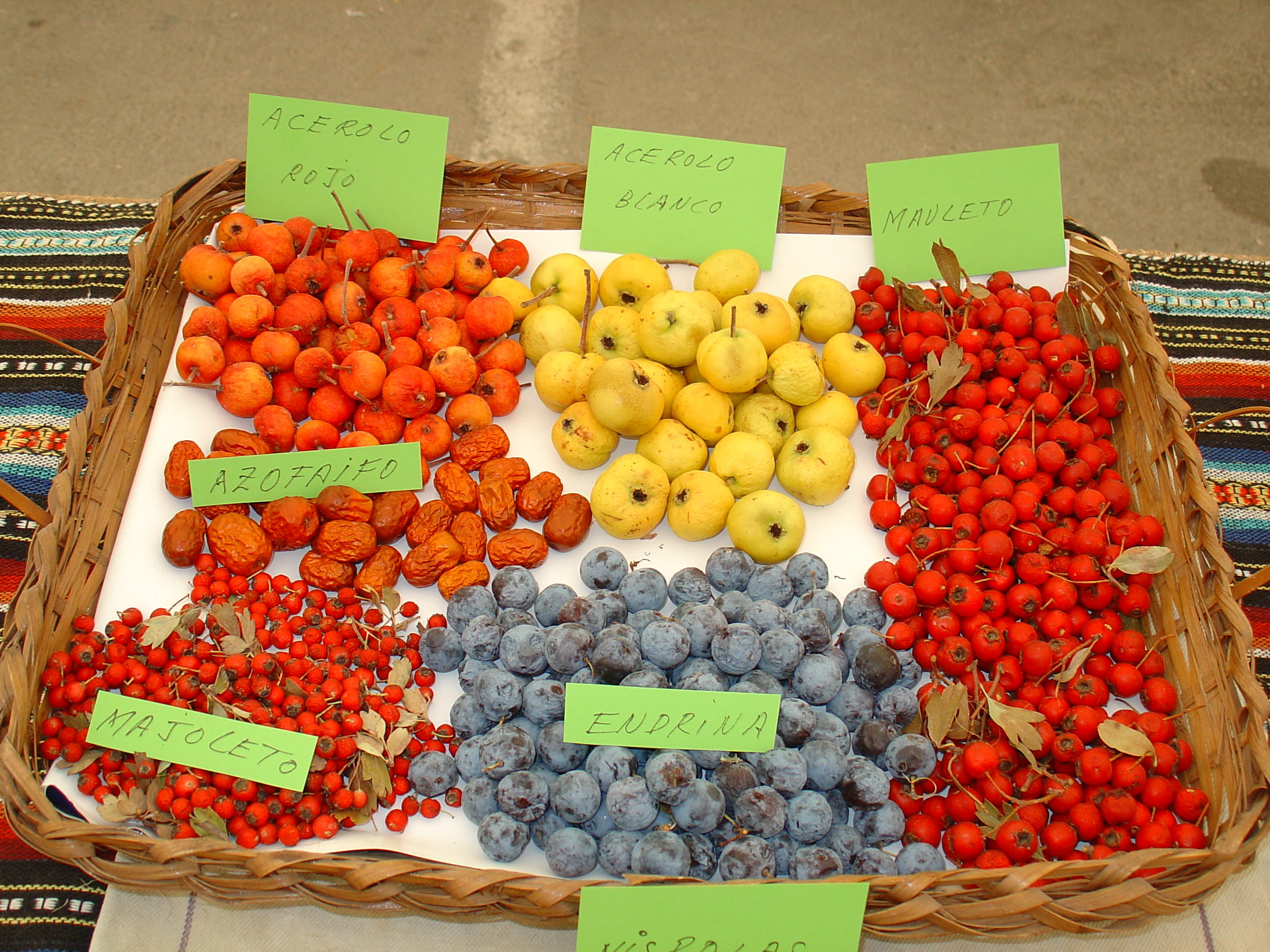
Orange and yellow azarole fruits displayed alongside common haws, sloes and jujubes.

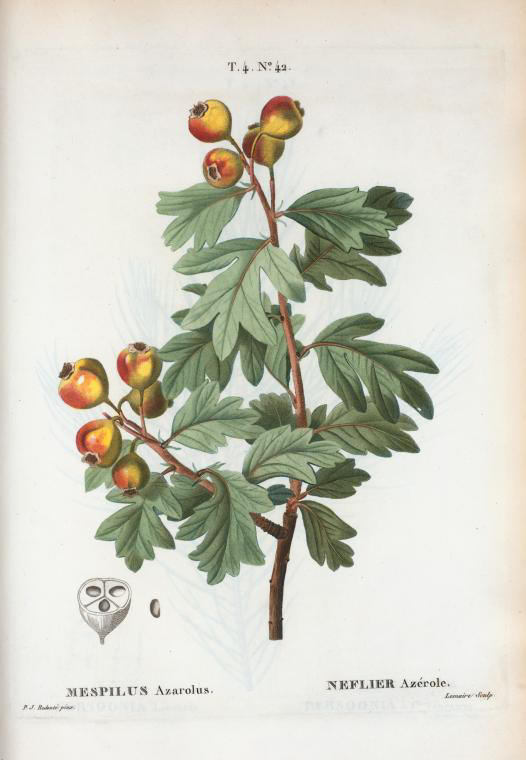
Botanical illustration from Duhamel du Monceau, H.L. 1768. Traité des arbres fruitiers

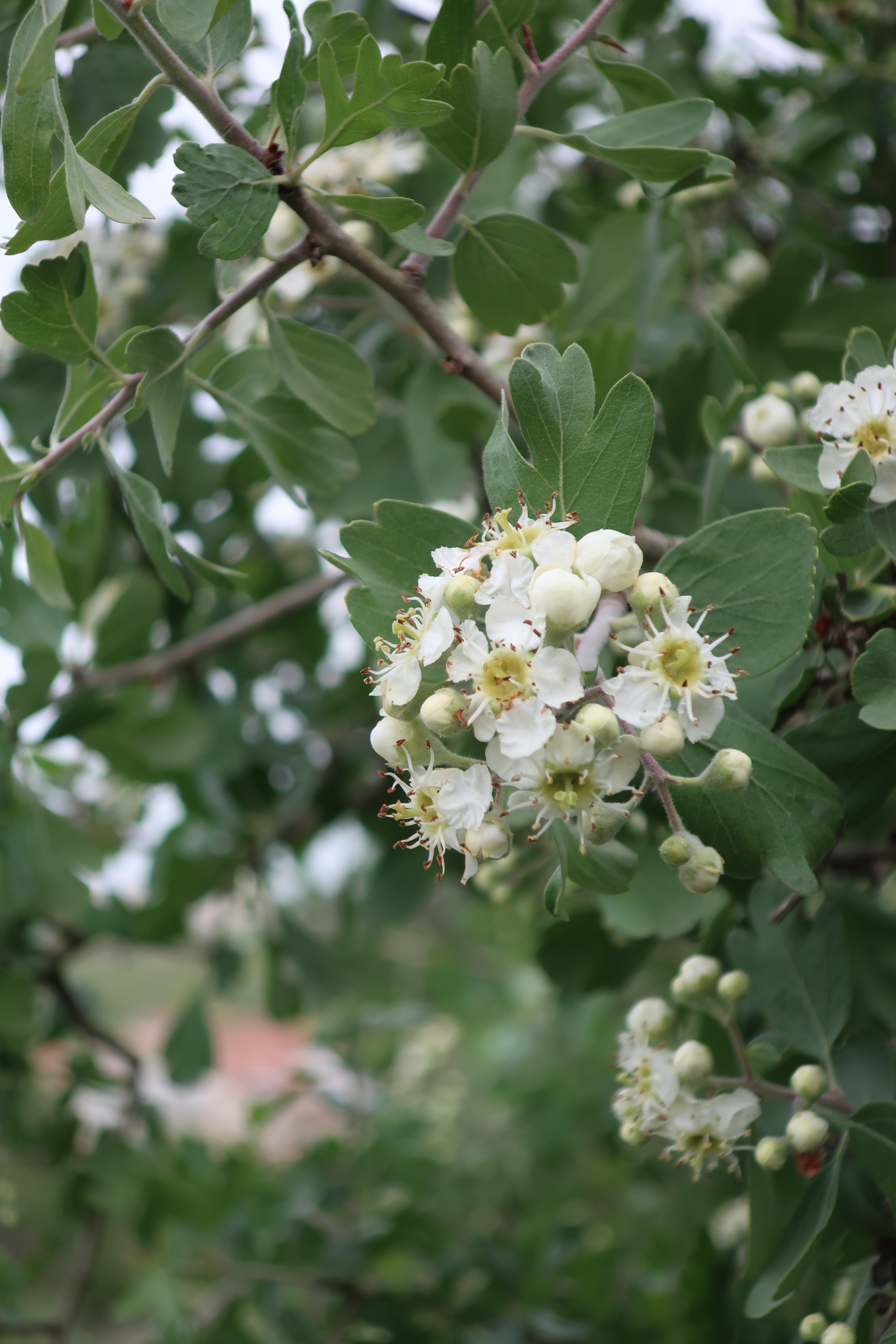
Crataegus azarolus var. aronia in bloom
