= Crataegus × yosgatica =

Scientific classification
- Kingdom: Plantae
- Clade: Tracheophytes
- Clade: Angiosperms
- Clade: Eudicots
- Clade: Rosids
- Order: Rosales
- Family: Rosaceae
- Subtribe: Malinae
- Genus: Crataegus
- Species: C. × yosgatica

Binomial name
- Crataegus × yosgatica K.I.Chr.

Putative hybrid species of plant

Crataegus × yosgatica or Crataegus yosgatica is a putative hybrid species of hawthorn, found in Turkey. It was thought to be a cross between Crataegus monogyna and C. tanacetifolia. A 2014 molecular and morphological study reduced it to a synonym of Crataegus meyeri.
