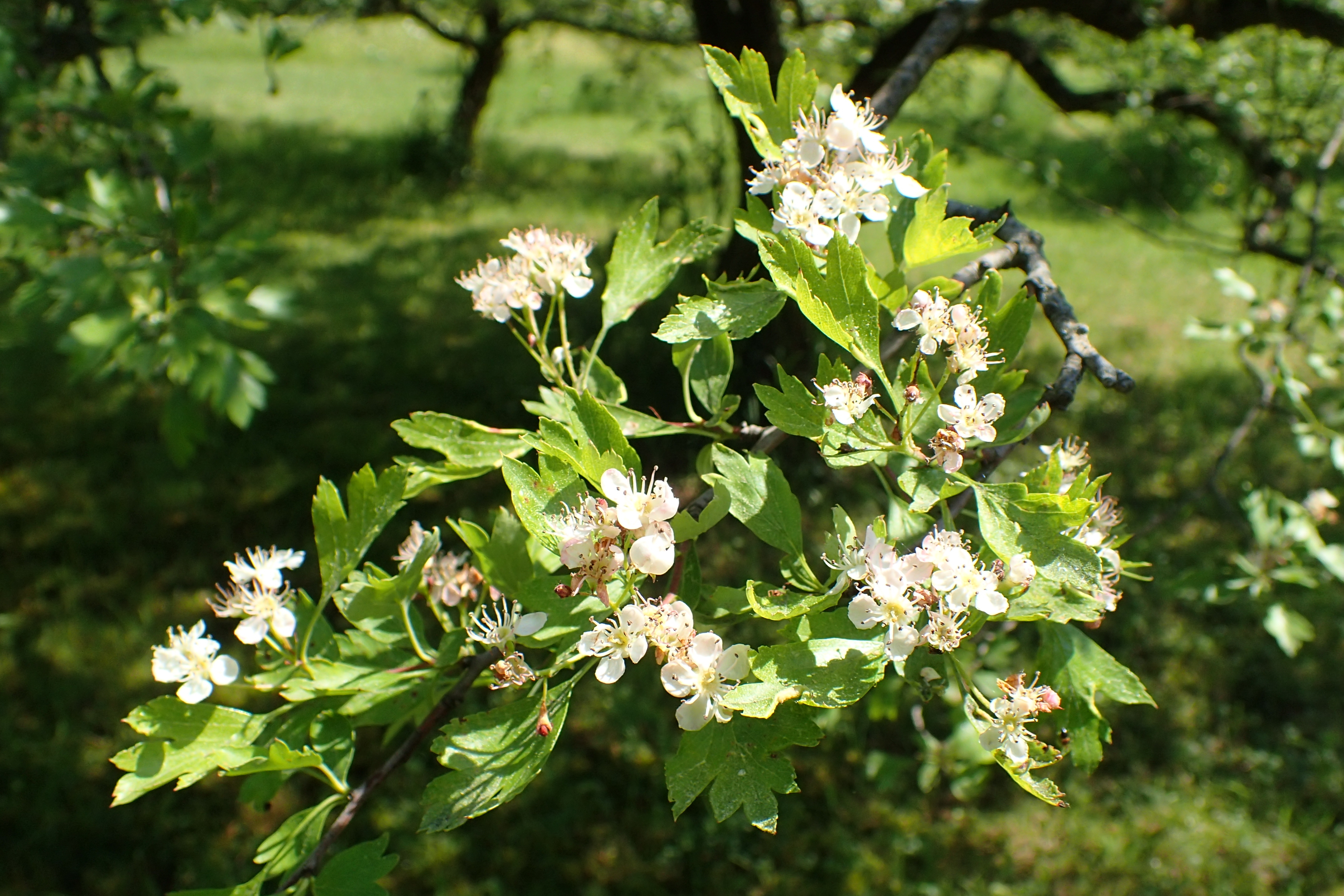
- Crataegus pseudoheterophylla subsp. turcomanica

Scientific classification
- Kingdom: Plantae
- Clade: Tracheophytes
- Clade: Angiosperms
- Clade: Eudicots
- Clade: Rosids
- Order: Rosales
- Family: Rosaceae
- Subtribe: Malinae
- Genus: Crataegus
- Species: C. pseudoheterophylla

Binomial name
- Crataegus pseudoheterophylla Pojark.

= Crataegus pseudoheterophylla =

Species of flowering plant

Crataegus pseudoheterophylla is a species of hawthorn found in Anatolia, the Transcaucasus, Iran and Afghanistan. They are trees or shrubs that are typically found on scrubby mountain slopes.

== Subspecies ==
A number of subspecies have been proposed:

- Crataegus pseudoheterophylla subsp. pseudoheterophylla autonym
- Crataegus pseudoheterophylla subsp. turcomanica (Pojark.) K.I.Chr. found in Iran and Turkmenistan
- Crataegus pseudoheterophylla subsp. turkestanica (Pojark.) K.I.Chr. found in Iran, Central Asia, and Afghanistan
