= Crataegus stolonifera =

Scientific classification
- Kingdom: Plantae
- Clade: Tracheophytes
- Clade: Angiosperms
- Clade: Eudicots
- Clade: Rosids
- Order: Rosales
- Family: Rosaceae
- Genus: Crataegus
- Section: Crataegus sect. Coccineae
- Series: Crataegus ser. Populneae
- Species: C. stolonifera

Binomial name
- Crataegus stolonifera Sarg.

Synonyms
- C. irracunda var. stolonifera (Sarg.) Kruschke

Species of hawthorn

Crataegus stolonifera is a hawthorn species native to the northeastern U.S. and southeastern Canada.
