= Crataegus ser. Populneae =

Scientific classification
- Kingdom: Plantae
- Clade: Tracheophytes
- Clade: Angiosperms
- Clade: Eudicots
- Clade: Rosids
- Order: Rosales
- Family: Rosaceae
- Genus: Crataegus
- Section: Crataegus sect. Coccineae
- Series: Crataegus ser. Populneae; J.B.Phipps

Species of hawthorn

Series Populneae is a series within the genus Crataegus that contains at least eight species of hawthorn trees and shrubs, native to Eastern North America. Only one species, C. populnea, is widespread.

== Species ==
The species in the series are:

- Crataegus beata
- Crataegus populnea
- Crataegus prona
- Crataegus jesupii
- Crataegus levis
- Crataegus delawarensis
- Crataegus aemula
- Crataegus stolonifera

The rare and poorly documented species Crataegus haemacarpa may also belong to this series.
