= Crataegus apiifolia =

Crataegus apiifolia is an illegitimate name for two species of hawthorns:

- Crataegus marshallii, parsley hawthorn
- Crataegus monogyna, common hawthorn
