= Crataegus lassa =

Conservation status
- Least Concern (IUCN 3.1)

Scientific classification
- Kingdom: Plantae
- Clade: Tracheophytes
- Clade: Angiosperms
- Clade: Eudicots
- Clade: Rosids
- Order: Rosales
- Family: Rosaceae
- Subtribe: Malinae
- Genus: Crataegus
- Species: C. lassa

Binomial name
- Crataegus lassa Beadle

Synonyms
- List: Crataegus adusta Beadle; Crataegus amica Beadle; Crataegus arguta Beadle; Crataegus audens Beadle; Crataegus constans Beadle; Crataegus crocea Beadle; Crataegus curva Beadle; Crataegus dapsilis Beadle; Crataegus dolosa Beadle; Crataegus flava var. integra Nash; Crataegus frugalis Beadle; Crataegus illudens Beadle; Crataegus incana Beadle; Crataegus inopina Beadle; Crataegus inops Beadle; Crataegus integra (Nash) Beadle; Crataegus lanata Beadle; Crataegus meridiana Beadle; Crataegus panda Beadle; Crataegus rava Beadle; Crataegus recurva Beadle; Crataegus rimosa Beadle; Crataegus sodalis Beadle; Crataegus vicana Beadle; Crataegus villaris Beadle

Species of flowering plant

Crataegus lassa, the sandhill hawthorn, is a species of hawthorn native to the southeastern United States. Small trees or large shrubs, they have a characteristic weeping or drooping habit, and grow in pine barrens, the Carolina sandhills region, the Florida longleaf pine sandhills, and similar areas with well-drained soils.
