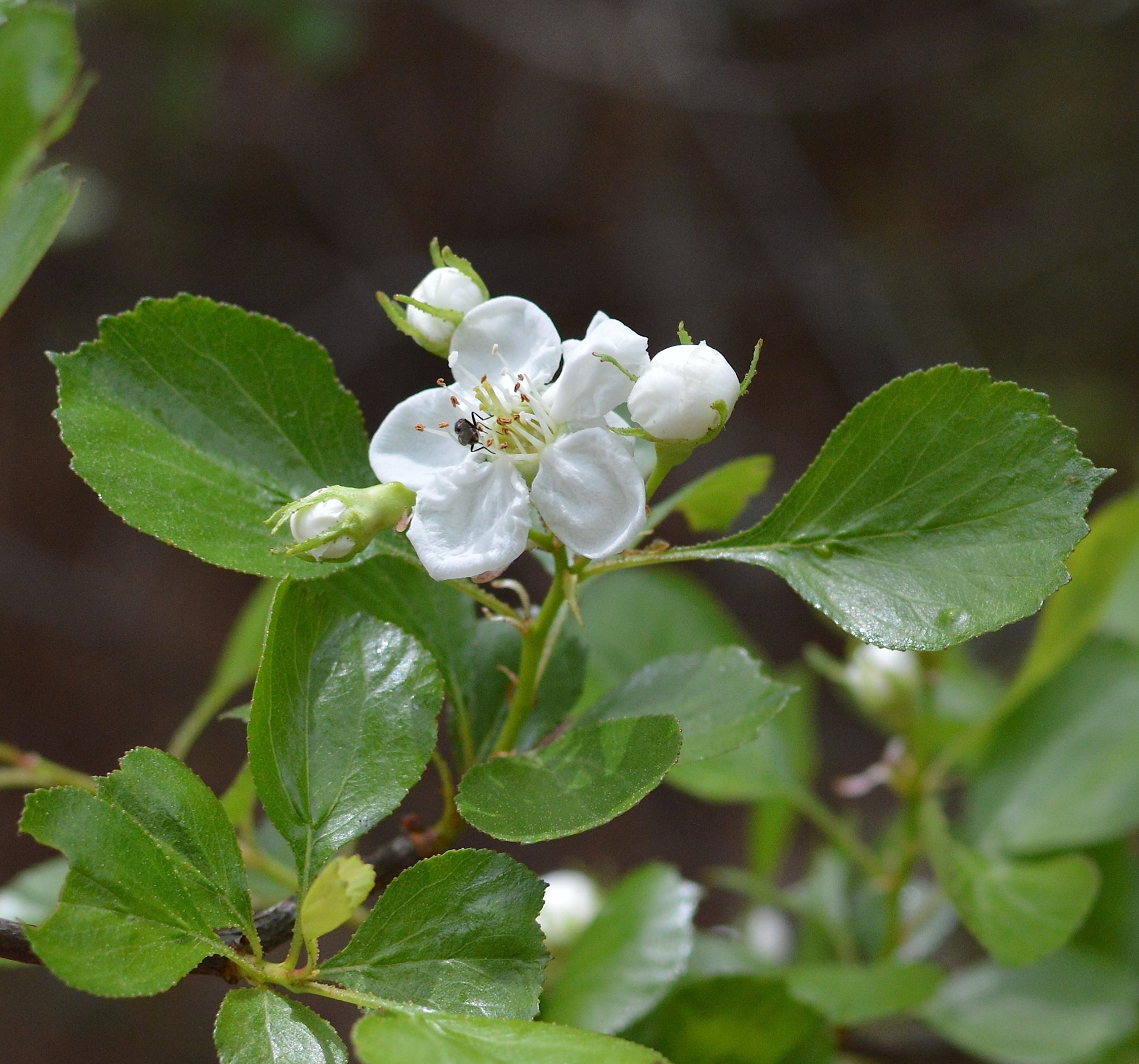

Conservation status
- Near Threatened (IUCN 3.1)

Scientific classification
- Kingdom: Plantae
- Clade: Tracheophytes
- Clade: Angiosperms
- Clade: Eudicots
- Clade: Rosids
- Order: Rosales
- Family: Rosaceae
- Genus: Crataegus
- Species: C. alabamensis

Binomial name
- Crataegus alabamensis Beadle

Synonyms
- List: Crataegus adunca Beadle; Crataegus alabamensis var. florens (Beadle) Lance; Crataegus alabamensis var. ravenelii (Sarg.) Lance; Crataegus alabamensis var. teres (Beadle) Lance; Crataegus alachuaniformis Murrill; Crataegus attrita Beadle; Crataegus clara Beadle; Crataegus compitalis Beadle; Crataegus florens Beadle; Crataegus fortis Beadle; Crataegus insidiosa Beadle; Crataegus ravenelii Sarg.; Crataegus ravenelii f. superba Murrill; Crataegus teres Beadle

= Crataegus alabamensis =

Species of plant in the rose family

Crataegus alabamensis, the Alabama hawthorn, is a species of flowering plant in the family Rosaceae, native to the southeastern United States. It can be distinguished from other hawthorns by its "beautifully formed" leaves with pronounced crenato-serrate margins.
