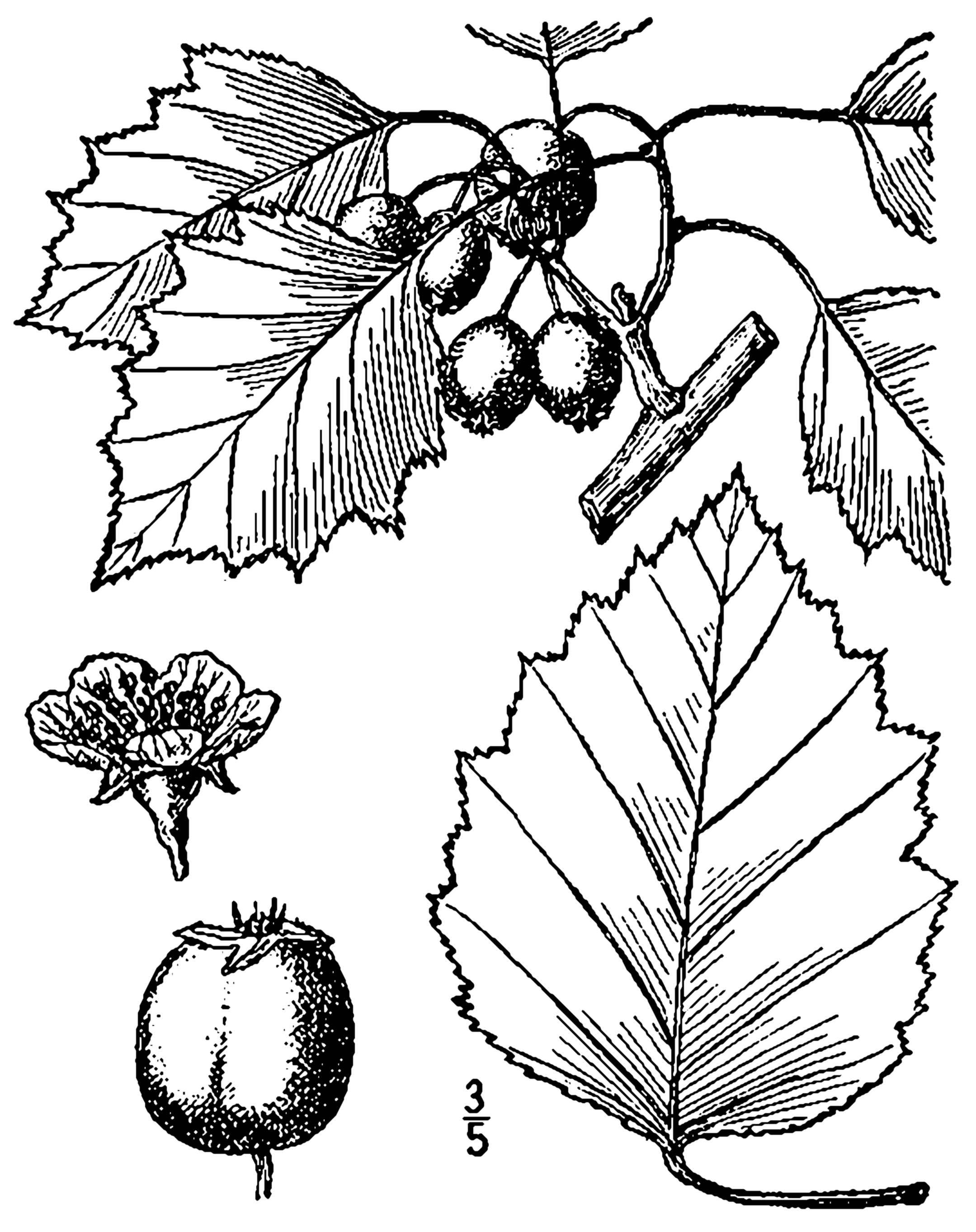
- Botanical illustration

Conservation status
- Least Concern (IUCN 3.1)

Scientific classification
- Kingdom: Plantae
- Clade: Tracheophytes
- Clade: Angiosperms
- Clade: Eudicots
- Clade: Rosids
- Order: Rosales
- Family: Rosaceae
- Genus: Crataegus
- Species: C. schuettei

Binomial name
- Crataegus schuettei Ashe

Synonyms
- List: Crataegus alnorum Sarg.; Crataegus basilica Beadle; Crataegus basilica var. viridimontana (Sarg.) E.J.Palmer; Crataegus ferrissii Ashe; Crataegus schuettei var. basilica (Beadle) J.B.Phipps; Crataegus schuettei var. cuneata Kruschke; Crataegus schuettei var. ferrissii (Ashe) Kruschke; Crataegus tortilis Ashe; Crataegus viridimontana Sarg.; Oxyacantha alnorum (Sarg.) Nieuwl.

= Crataegus schuettei =

Species of flowering plant

Crataegus schuettei, the royal hawthorn or Schuette's hawthorn, is a species of shrubby tree in the family Rosaceae, native to northeastern North America; from Arkansas and North Carolina north to Ontario and Quebec. It is typically found growing in forest edges and old fields. Its ripe fruit is red.

== Subtaxa ==
The following varieties are accepted:

- Crataegus schuettei var. cuneata Kruschke ex J.B.Phipps – Minnesota, Wisconsin
- Crataegus schuettei var. gigantea Kruschke ex J.B.Phipps – Wisconsin
- Crataegus schuettei var. schuettei
