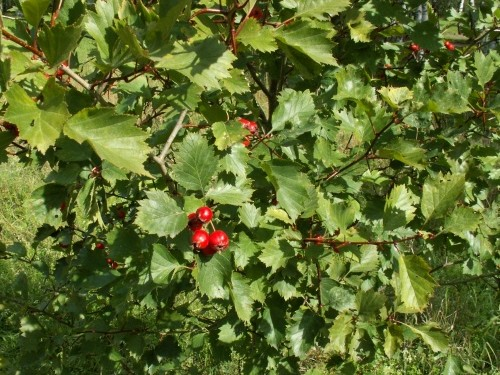
- Crataegus flabellata var. grayana

Conservation status
- Least Concern (IUCN 3.1)

Scientific classification
- Kingdom: Plantae
- Clade: Tracheophytes
- Clade: Angiosperms
- Clade: Eudicots
- Clade: Rosids
- Order: Rosales
- Family: Rosaceae
- Genus: Crataegus
- Section: Crataegus sect. Coccineae
- Series: Crataegus ser. Tenuifoliae
- Species: C. flabellata

Binomial name
- Crataegus flabellata (Bosc ex Spach) Rydb.

Synonyms
- C. crudelis Sarg.; C. coccinea var. flabellata (Bosc ex Spach) Britton; C. densiflora Sarg. nom. illeg.; C. grayana Eggl.; Mespilus flabellata Bosc ex Spach

= Crataegus flabellata =

Fanleaf hawthorn

Species of hawthorn

Crataegus flabellata is a species of hawthorn known by the common name fanleaf hawthorn. It is native to the northeastern United States and adjacent Canada. It is intermediate in appearance between C. macrosperma and C. chrysocarpa. C. macrosperma, which occurs throughout the range of C. flabellata and also in the southeastern U.S., is often misidentified as C. flabellata.

== Varieties ==
Crataegus crudelis Sarg. is a form of C. flabellata from Quebec that has very long thorns (up to 10 cm). The two varieties C. flabellata var. grayana (Eggl.) E.J. Palmer and C. flabellata, var. flabellata differ in that the first has 20 stamens per flower, and the latter has 10 stamens, but in other features the two varieties are variable and the features overlap.

Hardy and robust, the grayana variety is commonly grown as a hedge in Sweden and Finland, where it was introduced in the 18th century by the botanist Pehr Kalm and is known as "hedge hawthorn" (Swedish häckhagtorn, Finnish aitaorapihlaja).
