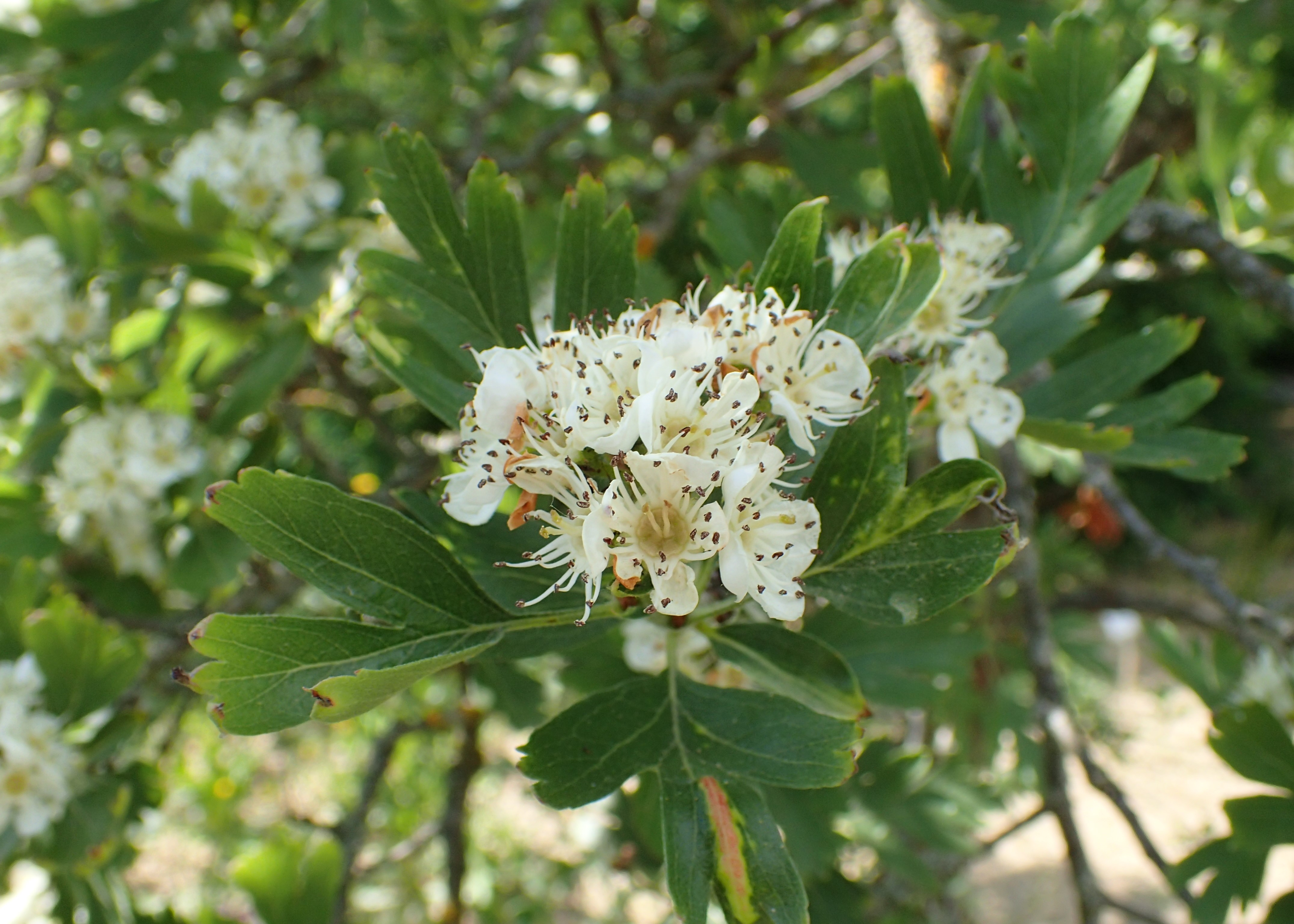
- Here given as Crataegus azarolus var. pontica

Conservation status
- Least Concern (IUCN 3.1)

Scientific classification
- Kingdom: Plantae
- Clade: Tracheophytes
- Clade: Angiosperms
- Clade: Eudicots
- Clade: Rosids
- Order: Rosales
- Family: Rosaceae
- Subtribe: Malinae
- Genus: Crataegus
- Species: C. pontica

Binomial name
- Crataegus pontica K.Koch

Synonyms
- Crataegus aronia var. pontica (W.D.J.Koch) Zohary & Danin; Crataegus azarolus var. pontica (W.D.J.Koch) K.I.Chr.; Crataegus pontica f. aurantiaca Cinovskis

= Crataegus pontica =

Species of flowering plant

Crataegus pontica is a species of flowering plant in the family Rosaceae. It is a hawthorn found in Turkey (including East Thrace), the South Caucasus, possibly Palestine and Jordan, Iraq, Iran and Central Asia. It is planted as a windbreak, and its yellow to orange fruit are made into marmalade, or dried and ground to be added as a flavoring to baking flour.
