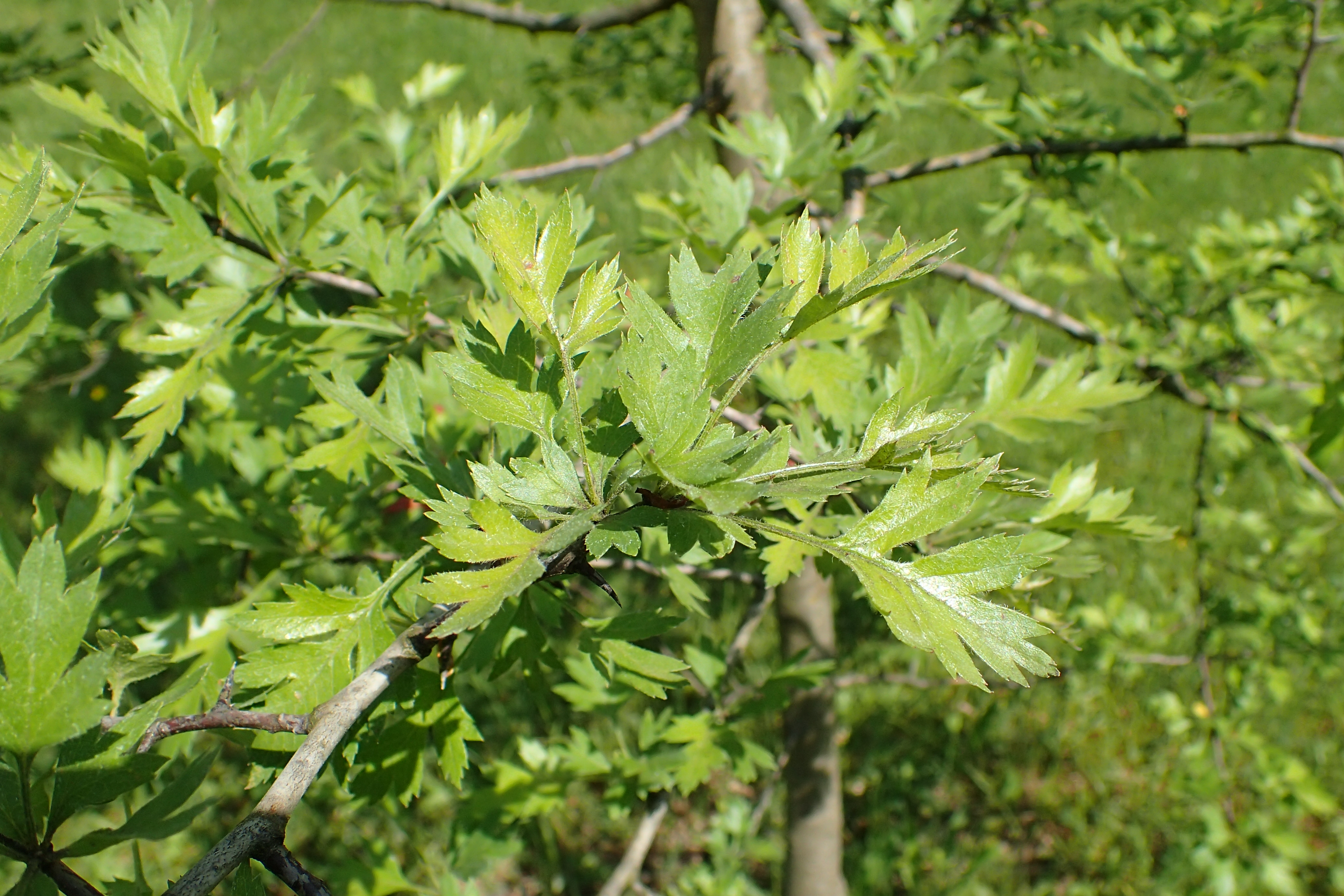

Scientific classification
- Kingdom: Plantae
- Clade: Tracheophytes
- Clade: Angiosperms
- Clade: Eudicots
- Clade: Rosids
- Order: Rosales
- Family: Rosaceae
- Genus: Crataegus
- Species: C. microphylla

Binomial name
- Crataegus microphylla K.Koch

Subspecies
- Crataegus microphylla subsp. malyana K.I.Chr. & Janjic; Crataegus microphylla subsp. microphylla

Synonyms
- Crataegus laevigata subsp. microphyllaz (K.Koch) Dostál; Crataegus lagenaria Fisch. & C.A.Mey. ex Boiss.; Crataegus monogyna var. lagenaria Wenz.; Mespilus microphylla (K.Koch) K.Koch; Mespilus monogyna var. lagenaria Wenz.

= Crataegus microphylla =

Species of flowering plant

Crataegus microphylla is a species of flowering plant in the family Rosaceae. It is a hawthorn found in the former Yugoslavia, Bulgaria, Ukraine, Crimea, European Russia, the Transcaucasus, Anatolia, Iraq and Iran. Typically a slender shrub, it is occasionally grown as an ornamental.
