= Crataegus populnea =

Scientific classification
- Kingdom: Plantae
- Clade: Tracheophytes
- Clade: Angiosperms
- Clade: Eudicots
- Clade: Rosids
- Order: Rosales
- Family: Rosaceae
- Genus: Crataegus
- Section: Crataegus sect. Coccineae
- Series: Crataegus ser. Populneae
- Species: C. populnea

Binomial name
- Crataegus populnea Ashe

Synonyms
- C. compta Sarg.; C. luxuriosa Sarg.

Species of hawthorn

Crataegus populnea is a hawthorn native to the northeastern U.S. and southeastern Canada. The flowers have about 10 stamens with red to purple anthers, and the fruit are orange to red, about 1 cm in diameter, spherical or oblong. Crataegus compta is a variant with pear-shaped fruit.
