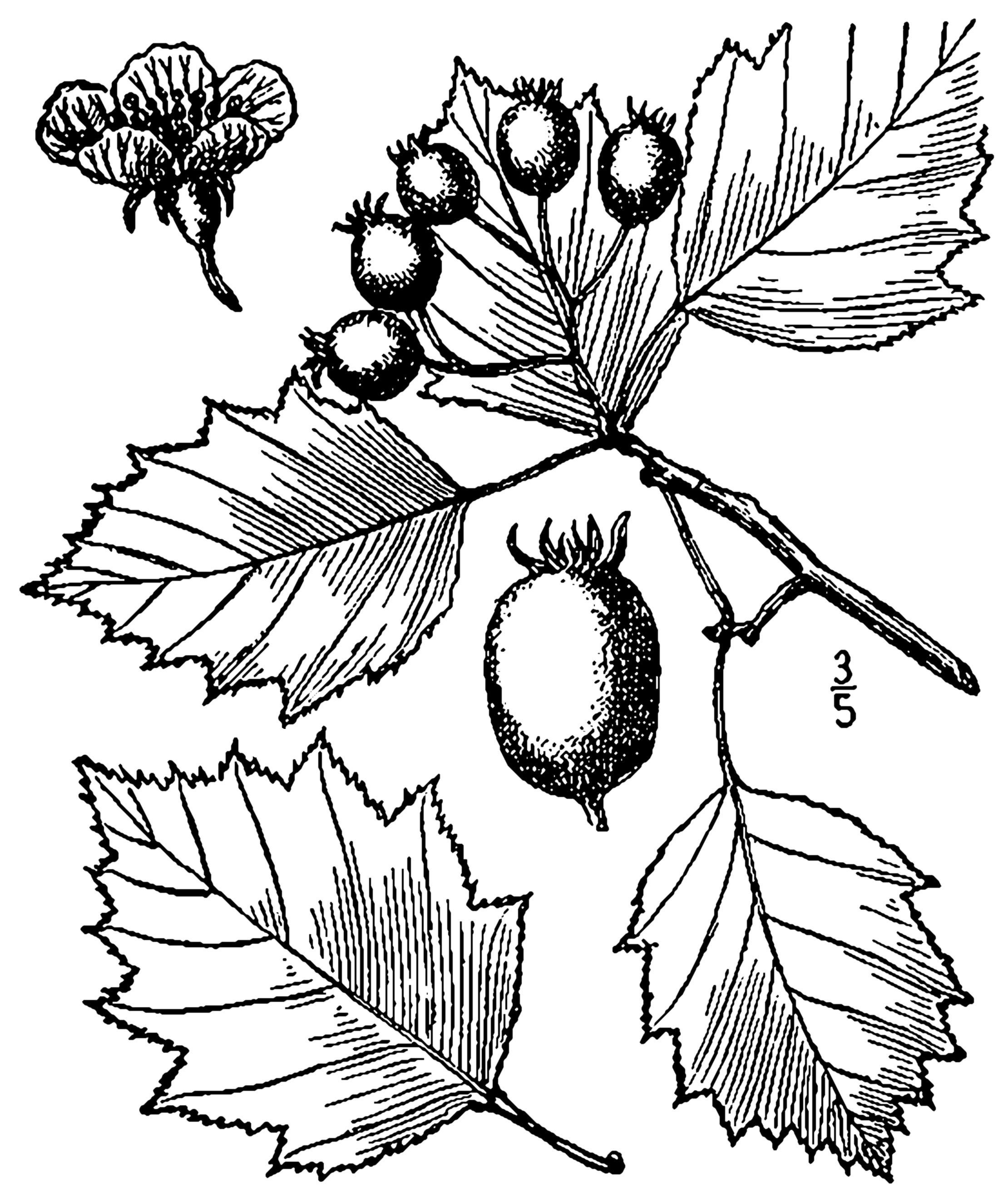

Conservation status
- Least Concern (IUCN 3.1)

Scientific classification
- Kingdom: Plantae
- Clade: Tracheophytes
- Clade: Angiosperms
- Clade: Eudicots
- Clade: Rosids
- Order: Rosales
- Family: Rosaceae
- Genus: Crataegus
- Section: Crataegus sect. Coccineae
- Series: Crataegus ser. Tenuifoliae
- Species: C. macrosperma

Binomial name
- Crataegus macrosperma Ashe

= Crataegus macrosperma =

Species of hawthorn

Crataegus macrosperma, the bigfruit hawthorn is a species of hawthorn native to most of the eastern United States and adjacent Canada, though uncommon at lower altitudes in the south. It is sometimes misidentified as C. flabellata. It is one of the earliest hawthorns to bloom in spring.

== Description ==
It is a small tree with long straight thorns. It has white flowers that bloom during the spring that smell like dead fish, attracting midges that fertilize the flowers, resulting in edible reddish-orange fruits that appear during the fall.

The most fruit will appear if grown in full sunlight. It tolerates clay soils, drought, and wind, but not salt air. Seed-grown trees will take 5–8 years before producing fruit, but grafted trees often have flowers by the third year.

== Ethnobotany ==
The fruit can be eaten raw or cooked. The leaves, berries, and flowers are used in medicine for cardiovascular health.
