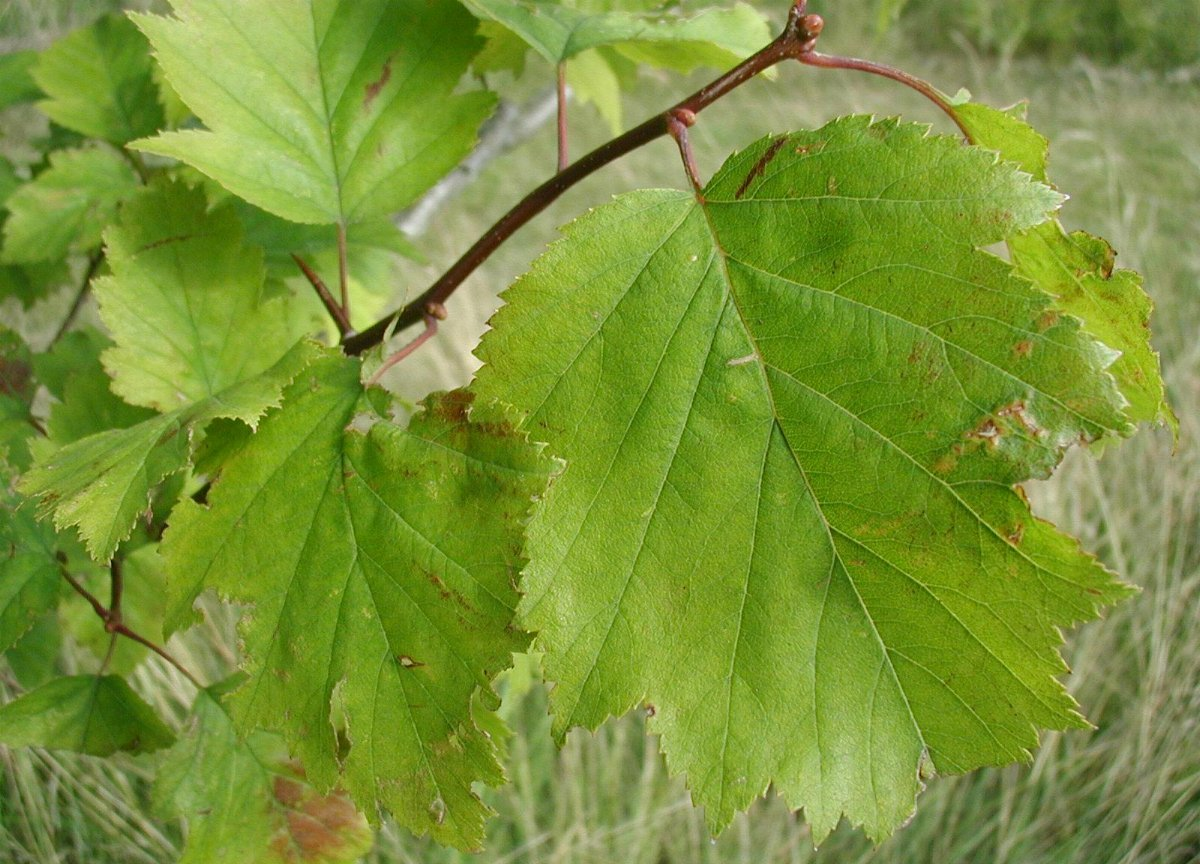

Scientific classification
- Kingdom: Plantae
- Clade: Tracheophytes
- Clade: Angiosperms
- Clade: Eudicots
- Clade: Rosids
- Order: Rosales
- Family: Rosaceae
- Genus: Crataegus
- Section: Crataegus sect. Coccineae
- Series: Crataegus ser. Intricatae
- Species: C. intricata

Binomial name
- Crataegus intricata Lange

Synonyms
- List: Crataegus apposita Sarg.; Crataegus biltmoreana Beadle; Crataegus biltmoreana var. stonei (Sarg.) Kruschke; Crataegus boyntonii Beadle; Crataegus buckleyi Beadle; Crataegus communis Beadle; Crataegus confusa Sarg.; Crataegus craytonii Beadle; Crataegus foetida Ashe; Crataegus horseyi E.J.Palmer; Crataegus intricata var. biltmoreana (Beadle) Lance; Crataegus intricata var. boyntonii (Beadle) Kruschke; Crataegus intricata var. rubella (Beadle) Kruschke; Crataegus intricata var. straminea (Beadle) E.J.Palmer; Crataegus intricata f. straminea (Beadle) Kruschke; Crataegus ouachitensis var. minor E.J.Palmer; Crataegus padifolia var. incarnata Sarg.; Crataegus rubella Beadle; Crataegus stonei Sarg.; Crataegus straminea Beadle; Crataegus villicarpa Sarg.; Mespilus biltmoreana (Beadle) Daniels

= Crataegus intricata =

Species of hawthorn

Crataegus intricata is a species of hawthorn known by the common names Copenhagen hawthorn, Lange's thorn and thicket hawthorn. It is native to eastern Canada and the eastern United States. Its fruit are brown to red.
