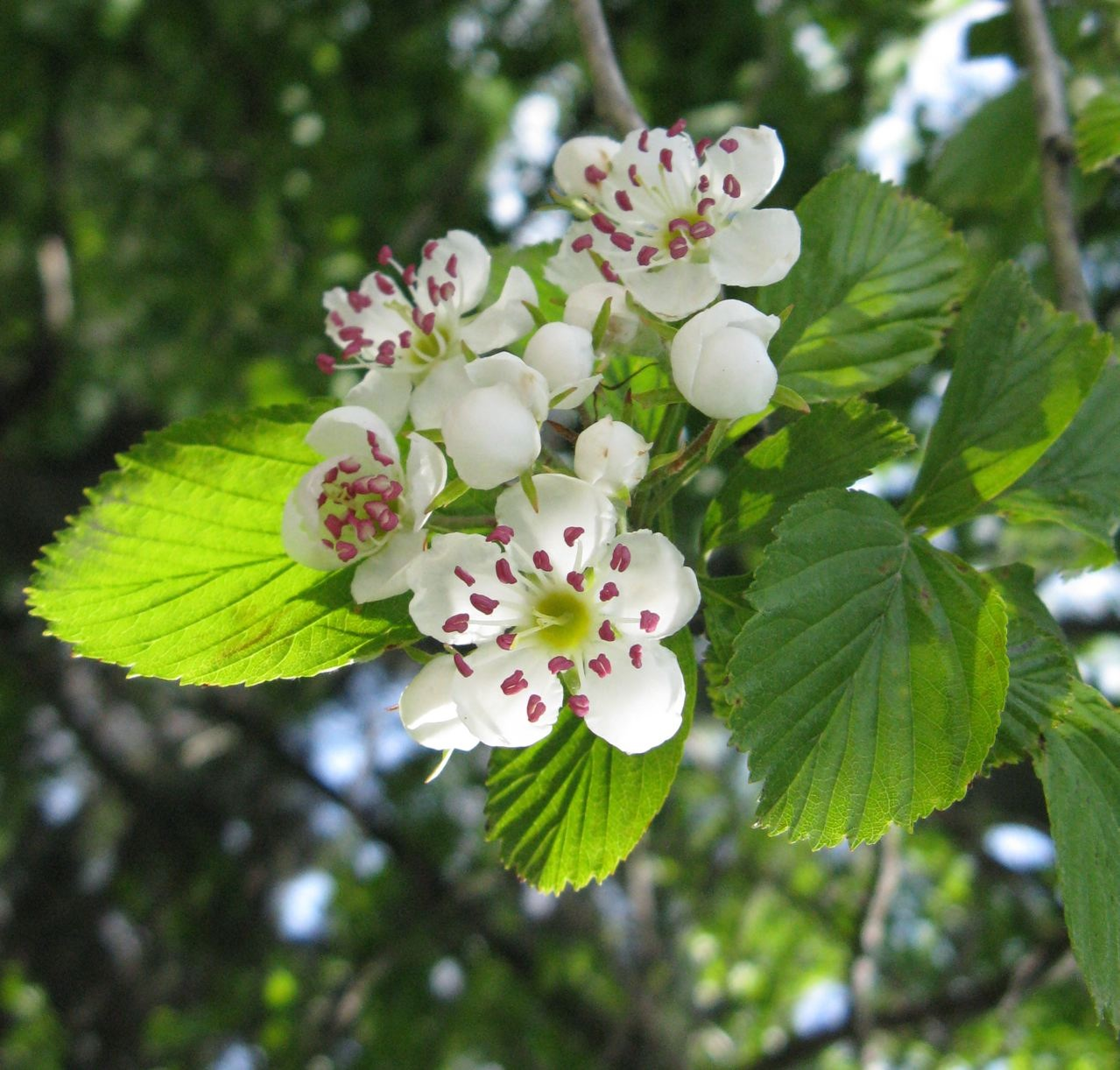
- A red-anthered form of this variable species

Conservation status
- Least Concern (IUCN 3.1)

Scientific classification
- Kingdom: Plantae
- Clade: Tracheophytes
- Clade: Angiosperms
- Clade: Eudicots
- Clade: Rosids
- Order: Rosales
- Family: Rosaceae
- Genus: Crataegus
- Section: Crataegus sect. Coccineae
- Series: Crataegus ser. Punctatae
- Species: C. punctata

Binomial name
- Crataegus punctata Jacq.

= Crataegus punctata =

Species of hawthorn

Crataegus punctata is a species of hawthorn known by the common names dotted hawthorn or white haw that is native to most of the eastern United States and eastern Canada. While some sources claim it is the state flower of Missouri, the actual legislation does not identify an exact species. Furthermore, the Missouri Department of Conservation asserts the Crataegus mollis was specifically designated as the state flower.

== Description ==
Although many North American hawthorns are polyploid and reproduce by apomixis, this species is apparently diploid and sexual, at least throughout Ontario, Canada. The name white haw refers to its distinctive pale (grey) bark, which is particularly noticeable in the winter landscape. The plant is a bush or small tree to about 7 meters in height and very thorny, particularly on the trunk. The flower has three to five styles and approximately 20 stamens, and the fruit is a pome-type polypyrenous drupe which contains three to five pits. Anther colour varies from deep purple through red to pink to white, and the mature fruit colour can be deep burgundy, scarlet, yellow, or yellow with a red cheek.

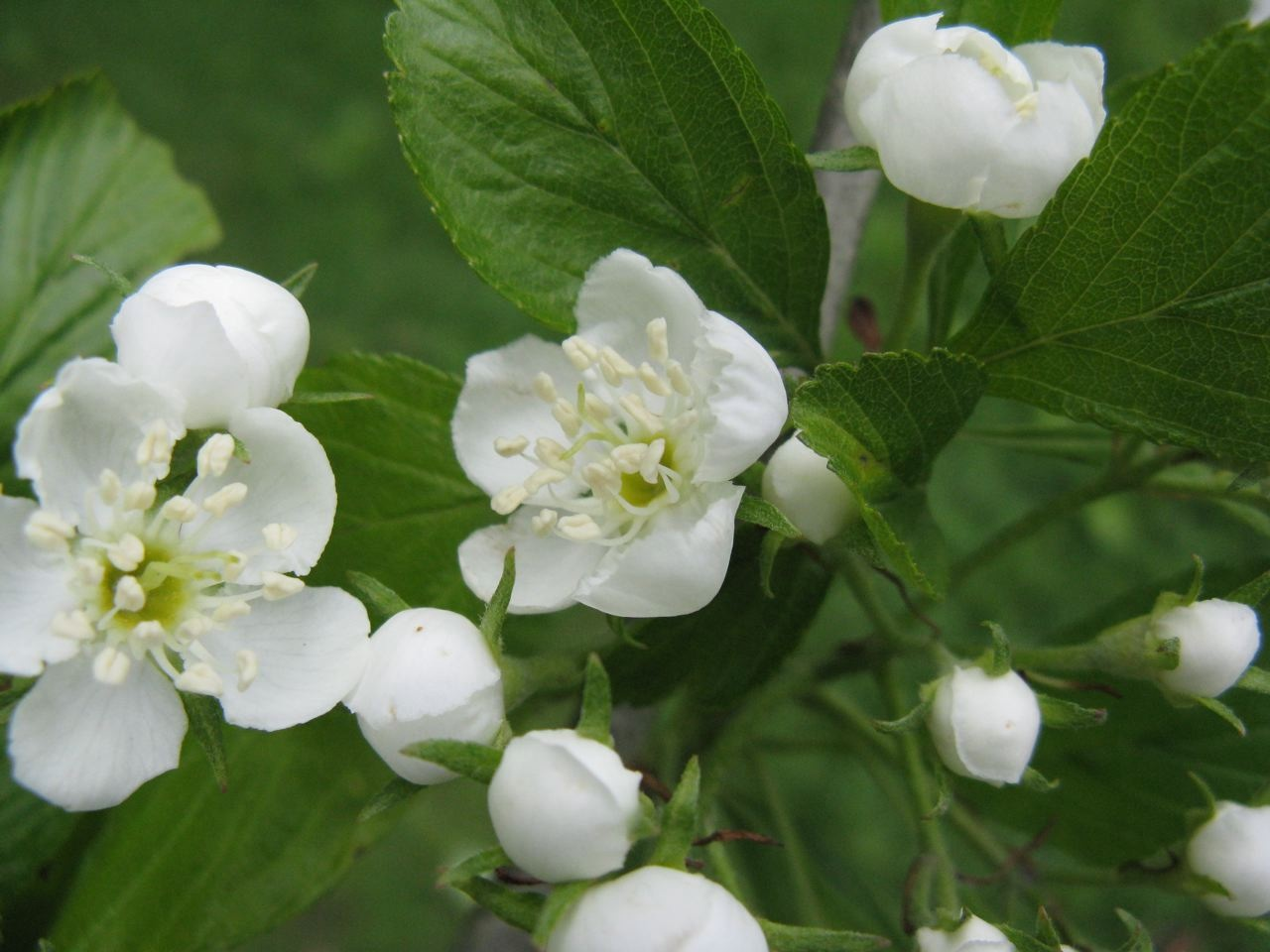
Flowers of a white-anthered form

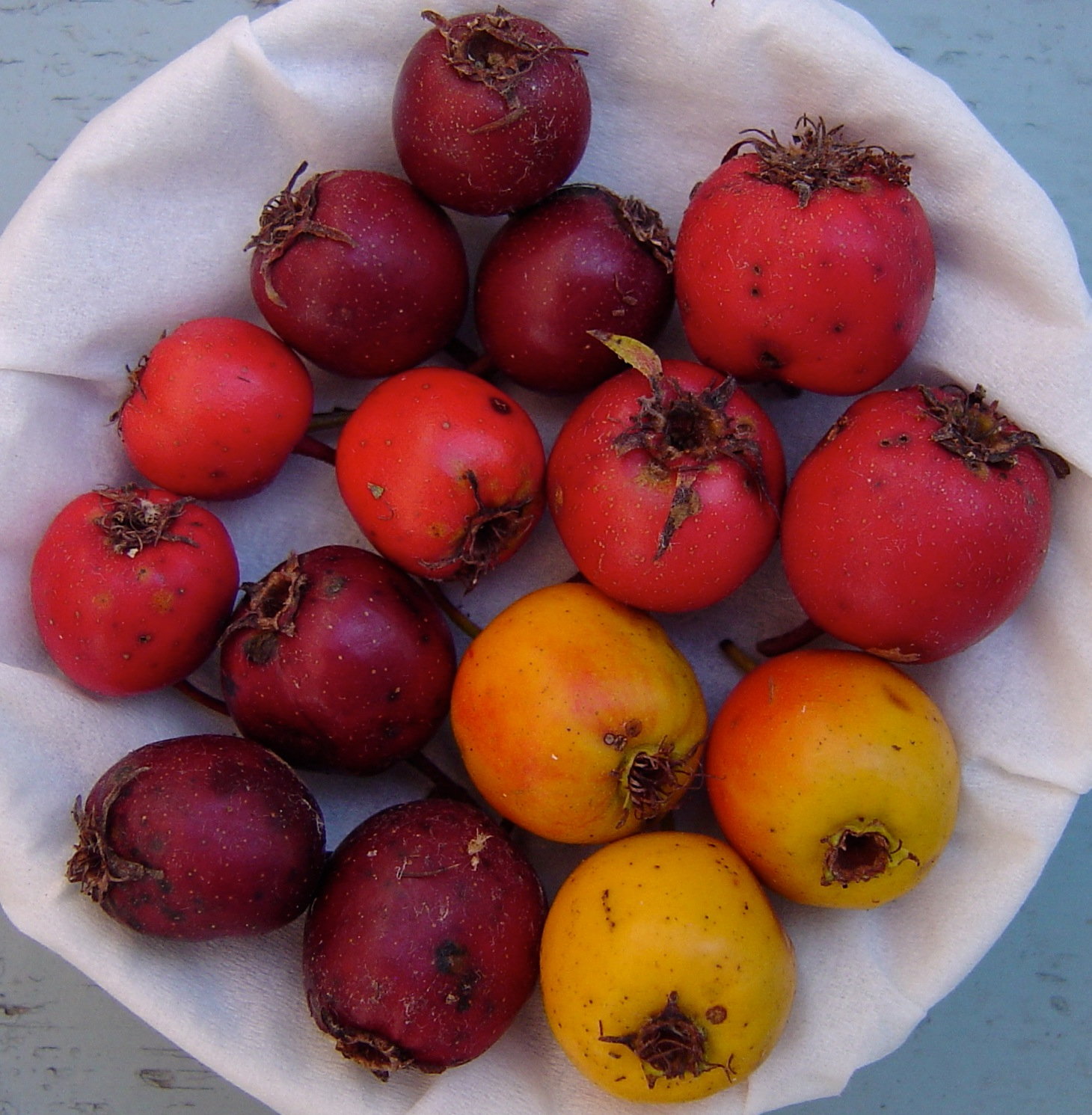
Fruit colour varies

== See also ==
- List of hawthorn species with yellow fruit
