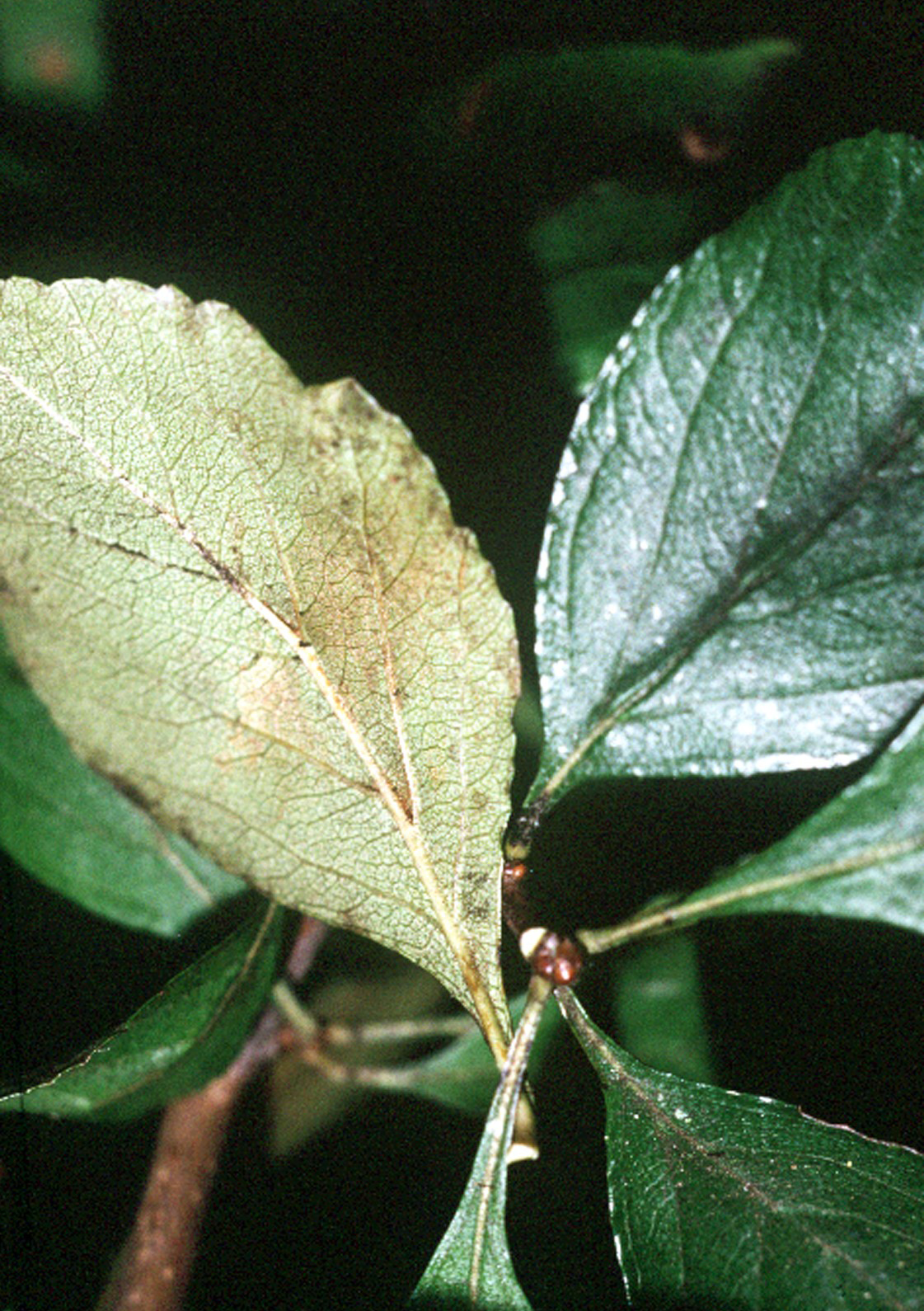

Conservation status
- Least Concern (IUCN 3.1)

Scientific classification
- Kingdom: Plantae
- Clade: Tracheophytes
- Clade: Angiosperms
- Clade: Eudicots
- Clade: Rosids
- Order: Rosales
- Family: Rosaceae
- Genus: Crataegus
- Section: Crataegus sect. Coccineae
- Series: Crataegus ser. Aestivales
- Species: C. aestivalis

Binomial name
- Crataegus aestivalis (Walter) Torr. & A.Gray

Synonyms
- C. cerasoides Sarg.; C. fruticosa Sarg.; C. luculenta Sarg.; C. maloides Sarg.; C. monantha Sarg.; Mespilus aestivalis Walter

= Crataegus aestivalis =

Species of hawthorn

Crataegus aestivalis, known as the eastern mayhaw, is a shrub or small tree of the southeastern United States that grows in low-lying or wet areas from eastern Alabama to central Florida and Virginia. It is one of several species of hawthorn with fruits known as "mayhaws", which are harvested for use in making mayhaw jelly, considered a delicacy in many areas of the South. Other species of mayhaws include Crataegus opaca, the western May Hawthorn, which is native from east Texas to Alabama.

The jelly is a rosy color, with a delicate flavor. It's sometimes commercially available at farm stands or specialty Southern food stores.

== Distribution and habitat ==
C. aestivalis is found in the southeastern corner of the United States, from Virginia to Mississippi.

It most often grows in swamp forests that are flooded for much of the year, and is occasionally found in groves or stands known as "mayhaw flats". As such, it is considered an obligate wetland species.

C. aestivalis prefers full sun, but can tolerate partial shade. It can grow in a variety of soil conditions, though it prefers well-drained, slightly acidic soils. It is tolerant of air pollution.

Common associates include Planera aquatica, Nyssa aquatica, Nyssa biflora, and Quercus virginiana.

== Diseases and parasites ==
Mayhaw can be affected by diseases and insects that impact other pome fruit species, including insects such as the hawthorn lace bug, mealy bugs, leafminers, and the roundheaded appletree borer and diseases including fruit rot, cedar-quince rust, fire blight, and cedar-hawthorn rust. With that said, most mayhaws are rarely affected by pests and diseases.

== Cultivation ==
Annual pruning of sucker stems and weak branches, opening up the canopy, can increase fruit production.

== Uses ==
The wood of C. aestivalis can be used to make mallets and tool handles, and the plant can be used medicinally in herbal folk medicine as a tea to treat high blood pressure. The fruit can be used for preserves, jelly, pies, and also can be dried for later use.
