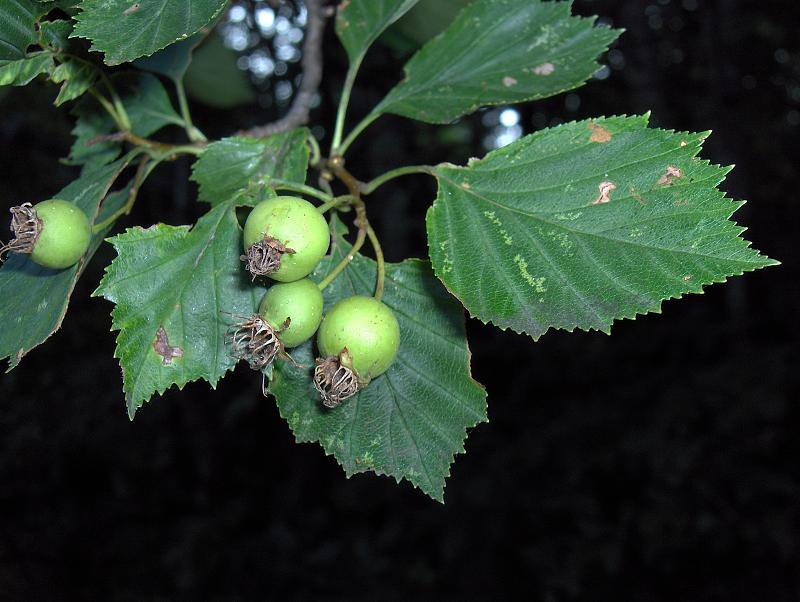

Conservation status
- Least Concern (IUCN 3.1)

Scientific classification
- Kingdom: Plantae
- Clade: Tracheophytes
- Clade: Angiosperms
- Clade: Eudicots
- Clade: Rosids
- Order: Rosales
- Family: Rosaceae
- Genus: Crataegus
- Section: Crataegus sect. Coccineae
- Series: Crataegus ser. Pruinosae
- Species: C. pruinosa

Binomial name
- Crataegus pruinosa (H.L.Wendl.) K.Koch

= Crataegus pruinosa =

Species of hawthorn

Crataegus pruinosa is a species of hawthorn known by the common name frosted hawthorn. It is native to a wide area of the eastern United States and southern Canada, and is sometimes considered to be several species, rather than just one.

The pulp of the small fruits is edible.

== Varieties ==
The following varieties are recognized in the Flora of North America (2015):

- C. pruinosa var. pruinosa, synonyms:
  - C. bracteata Sarg.
  - C. tumida Sarg.
- C. pruinosa var. dissona (Sarg.) Eggl., synonyms:
  - C. dissona Sarg.
  - C. brachypoda Sarg.
  - C. disjuncta Sarg.
  - C. rigida Sarg.
- C. pruinosa var. parvula (Sarg.) J.B.Phipps, synonyms:
  - C. parvula Sarg.
- C. pruinosa var. rugosa (Ashe) Kruschke, synonyms:
  - C. rugosa Ashe
  - C. leiophylla Sarg.
  - C. mackenziei Sarg. ex Mackenzie
  - C. rubicundula Sarg.
  - C. seclusa Sarg.
  - C. seducta Sarg.
- C. pruinosa var. virella (Ashe) Kruschke, synonyms:
  - C. virella Ashe
- C. pruinosa var. magnifolia (Sarg.) J.B.Phipps, synonyms:
  - C. magnifolia Sarg.
