= List of hawthorn species with yellow fruit =

Most species of Crataegus (hawthorn) have red fruit, others can have black or purple fruit, and some have yellow or orange fruit.

== European and Asian species ==
- C. altaica
- C. azarolus, fruit yellow, orange-yellowish, or red
- C. ×bornmuelleri, fruit yellowish, orange, or red
- C. cuneata, fruit can be red or yellow, native to China
- C. dahurica
- C. ferganensis
- C. kansuensis
- C. laevigata cultivar 'François Rigaud'
- C. orientalis var. pojarkovae
- C. ×pseudoazarolus, fruit orange to almost black
- C. pycnoloba, immature red fruit ripen to largely yellow
- C. scabrifolia, fruit can be red or yellow
- C. tanacetifolia
- C. ×tianshanica
- C. tkatschenkoi (syn: C. trilobata V.I.Tkachenko, nom. illeg.)
- C. russanovii
- C. wattiana
- C. zarrei, dark orange fruit

== American species ==
- C. albicera, series Crus-galli
- C. ambigens, series Silvicolae, fruit "greenish-yellow becoming dark purplish-red"
- C. amica, series Flavae, fruit "orange blotched with red"
- C. amplifica, series Pruinosae, fruit "light yellowish green to dark russet"
- C. anisophylla, series Flavae, fruit orange or orange and red
- C. angulata, series Pruinosae, fruit "light yellowish green becoming dark purplish-red"
- C. annosa, series Apricae, fruit yellow or orange, with red
- C. aprica series Apricae, fruit ripen through a yellow or orange phase before changing to red
- C. arenicola, series Uniflorae, fruit "orange or orange-red"
- C. arta, series Crus-galli, fruit yellow-green and orange-red
- C. attrita, series Flavae, fruit "yellow splashed with red"
- C. audens, series Flavae, fruit "orange-yellow flushed with red"
- C. aurescens, Series Madrenses
- C. austrina, series Pulcherrimae, fruit yellow-green or orange
- C. berberifolia, series Crus-galli, fruit orange or reddish
- C. biltmoreana, series Intricatae, fruit green, yellow, or orange
- C. bisulcata, series Uniflorae
- C. boothiana, series Tenuifoliae, fruit bright orange
- C. boyntonii, series Intricatae, fruit "yellow-green flushed with red"
- C. calva, series Flavae, fruit yellow or orange-red
- C. chrysocarpa, series Rotundifoliae, fruit ripen through a yellow or orange phase before ripening to red
- C. condigna, series Flavae, fruit "red or orange and greenish"
- C. contrita, series Pulcherrimae, fruit green or greenish yellow
- C. cornellii, series Intricatae
- C. crocea, series Flavae, fruit "yellow to russet-red"
- C. crocina, series Crus-galli
- C. croomeana, series Uniflorae,
- C. crus-galli, series Crus-galli, rare forms have yellow fruit,
- C. cullasagensis, series Flavae, fruit "dark orange, mottled with orange-red and crimson"
- C. dapsilis, series Flavae, fruit "yellow or orange and red"
- C. darlingtoniana, series Intricatae
- C. definita, series Intricatae, fruit green or greenish yellow
- C. delosii, series Intricatae, fruit orange tinged with red
- C. diversifolia, series Intricatae, fruit orange
- C. dodgei, series Rotundifoliae, fruit "dull crimson or orange"
- C. dolosa, series Flavae
- C. earlei, series Uniflorae
- C. edura, series Crus-galli
- C. egens, series Flavae, fruit "orange-red or orange and red"
- C. egglestonii, fruit "orange becoming crimson"
- C. flava, series Intricatae, fruit dull orange, a rare species whose name is rarely used correctly
- C. flavida, series Intricatae
- C. fortunata, series Intricatae
- C. furtiva, series Flavae, fruit "orange or orange and red"
- C. galbana, series Apricae, fruit orange to red
- C. geniculata, series Flavae, fruit "lemon-yellow or orange mottled with red"
- C. gilva, series Intricatae
- C. glabrata, series Macracanthae, fruit "crimson blotched with yellow"
- C. gracilior, series Crus-galli
- C. harveyana, series Intricatae, fruit orange
- C. ignava, series Apricae
- C. illudens, series Flavae
- C. incaedua, series Punctatae, fruit "yellowish red"
- C. incana, series Flavae, fruit "orange-yellow or orange and red"
- C. infesta, series Crus-galli
- C. inopina, series Flavae, fruit "yellow or orange-yellow and red"
- C. inops, series Flavae, fruit "orange or orange and red"
- C. intricata, series Intricatae
- C. kelloggii, series Molles
- C. lacrimata, series Flavae, fruit yellow or orange and red"
- C. lecta, series Pruinosae, fruit "light yellow-green becoming red"
- C. leimonia, series Silvicolae, fruit "orange-red blotched with yellow-green"
- C. leonensis, series Apricae, fruit orange-red to russet, or blotched with green
- C. lepida, series Flavae, fruit orange or orange-red
- C. luteola, series Intricatae
- C. margaretta, series Rotundifoliae, fruit "reddish or orange"
- C. meridiana, series Flavae, fruit "orange, yellow, or yellow flushed with red"
- C. mexicana, series Mexicanae
- C. minutiflora, series Intricatae, fruit "dull orange or orange and green"
- C. mira, series Apricae, fruit orange to red
- C. modesta, series Intricatae, fruit "bright yellow or orange-red"
- C. neofluvialis, series Macracanthae, fruit "greenish orange or flushed with red"
- C. opaca, some cultivars
- C. padifolia, series Intricatae, fruit "yellow flushed with pink, usually pink"
- C. pallens, series Intricatae
- C. panda, series Flavae, fruit "orange-red or orange tinged with red"
- C. peckii, series Intricatae, fruit "light yellow-green or red tinged"
- C. peramoena, series Macracanthae, fruit "light scarlet blotched with yellow"
- C. pertomentosa, series Macracanthae, fruit "red or yellowish, becoming dark red"
- C. pulcherrima, series Pulcherrimae, fruit yellow-green
- C. pulla, series Flavae, fruit "orange-yellow flushed with red"
- C. punctata var. aurea, series Punctatae
- C. quaesila, series Flavae, fruit red and orange
- C. radina, series Silvicolae, fruit "yellow-green to dark purplish-red"
- C. raleighensis, series Uniflorae
- C. rhodella, series Uniflorae, fruit orange and red
- C. rimosa, series Flavae, fruit "yellow or orange-yellow and red"
- C. riparia, series Silvicolae, fruit orange-yellow
- C. rosei subsp. parryana, series Crus-galli, fruit bright yellow
- C. sargentii, series Intricatae
- C. segnis, series Apricae, fruit orange to red
- C. sicca, series Pruinosae
- C. siderea, series Tenuifoliae, fruit yellow-green
- C. sinistra, series Crus-galli, fruit reddish, green, or yellow
- C. smithii, series Uniflorae, fruit orange
- C. sororia, series Flavae, fruit red or red and yellow
- C. stonei, series Intricatae, fruit "light yellow or greenish-yellow"
- C. straminea, series Intricatae, fruit yellowish green
- C. stratfordensis, series Macracanthae, fruit "greenish yellow mottled with crimson"
- C. structilis, series Macracanthae, fruit "orange or reddish-orange"
- C. subflavida (possibly the same as C. ignava)
- C. taetrica, series Tenuifoliae, fruit scarlet-yellow
- C. tetrica, series Crus-galli, fruit yellow-green
- C. tenax, series Punctatae, fruit "scarlet or mottled with yellow or olive"
- C. torta, series Pruinosae, fruit "light yellow or russet green"
- C. tripartita, series Virides, fruit yellow-green
- C. villicarpa, series Intricatae, fruit "orange-yellow or tinged with red"
- C. uniflora, series Uniflorae
- C. vailiae, series Macracanthae, fruit "yellowish-green becoming red"
- C. versuta, series Flavae, fruit "orange or greenish-yellow and red"
- C. viburnifolia, series Molles
- C. vicana, series Flavae, fruit "yellow or orange blotched with red"
- C. vicenda, series Flavae, fruit "yellow or flushed with red"
- C. villaris, series Flavae, fruit "yellow or orange-yellow flushed with red"
- C. virella, series Pruinosae, fruit "yellowish green blotched with pink, olive, or russet"
- C. visenda, series Apricae, fruit orange to red
- C. vivida, series Coccineae, fruit "dull orange-red blotched with yellow"

== See also ==
- List of hawthorn species with black fruit

== Sources ==
- Christensen, K.I. 1992. Revision of Crataegus sect. Crataegus and nothosect. Crataeguineae (Rosaceae-Maloideae) in the Old World. Systematic Botany Monographs 35: 1–199.
- Phipps, J.B., and Dvorsky, K.A. 2008. A taxonomic revision of Crataegus series Lacrimatae (Rosaceae). Journal of the Botanical Research Institute of Texas 2(2): 1101–1162.
