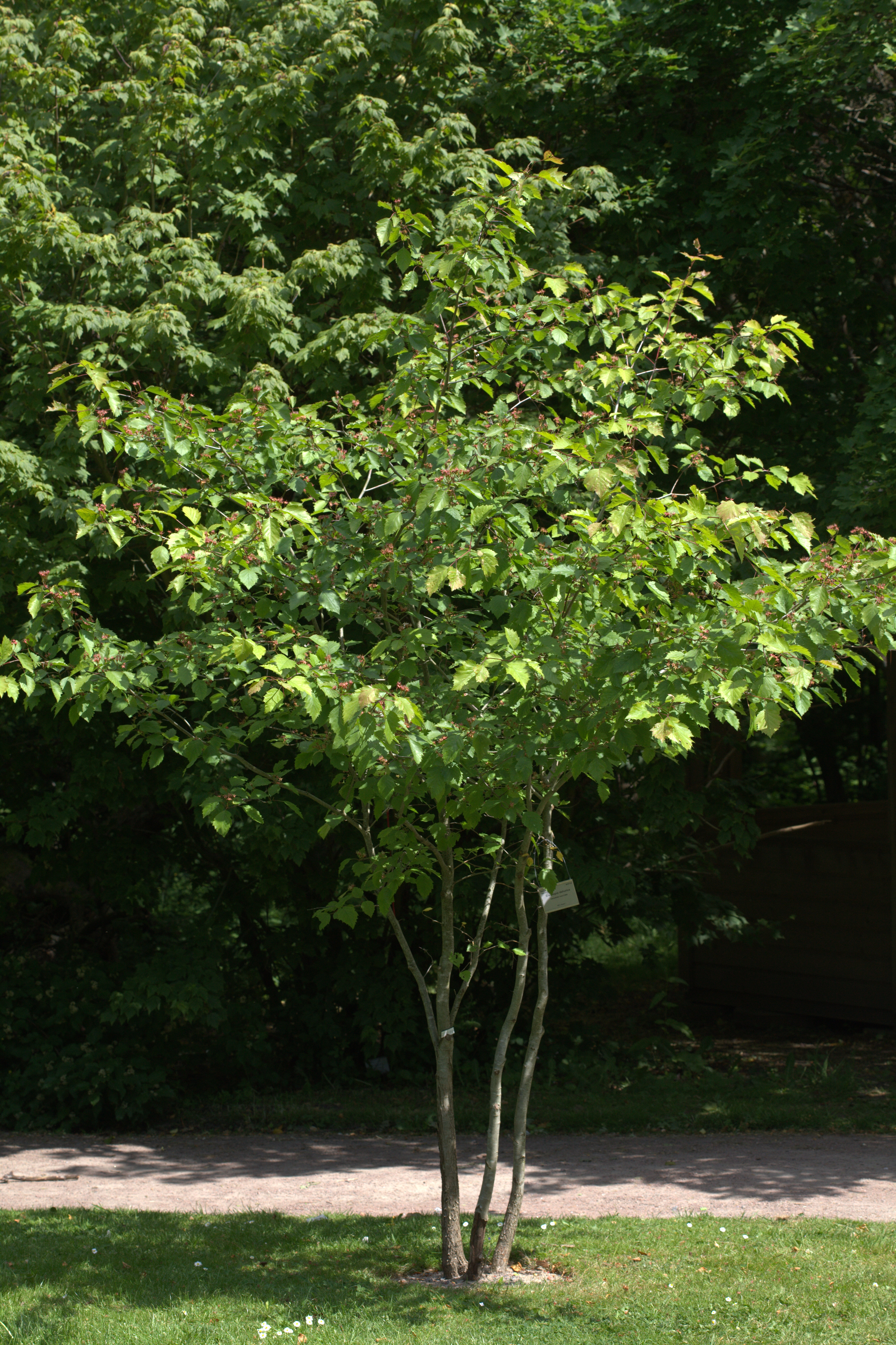

Conservation status
- Least Concern (IUCN 3.1)

Scientific classification
- Kingdom: Plantae
- Clade: Tracheophytes
- Clade: Angiosperms
- Clade: Eudicots
- Clade: Rosids
- Order: Rosales
- Family: Rosaceae
- Genus: Crataegus
- Section: Crataegus sect. Sanguineae
- Series: Crataegus ser. Sanguineae
- Species: C. dahurica

Binomial name
- Crataegus dahurica Koehne ex C.K.Schneid.

Synonyms
- Crataegus chitaensis Sarg.; Crataegus laevicalyx J.X.Huang, L.Y.Sun & T.J.Feng; Crataegus purpurea Bosc ex DC.

= Crataegus dahurica =

Species of hawthorn

Crataegus dahurica is a species of hawthorn native to northeastern Asia. It is closely related to C. sanguinea. The fruit are red or yellow.

== See also ==
- List of Crataegus species with yellow fruit
