= Crataegus rufula =

Scientific classification
- Kingdom: Plantae
- Clade: Tracheophytes
- Clade: Angiosperms
- Clade: Eudicots
- Clade: Rosids
- Order: Rosales
- Family: Rosaceae
- Genus: Crataegus
- Section: Crataegus sect. Coccineae
- Series: Crataegus ser. Aestivales
- Species: C. rufula

Binomial name
- Crataegus rufula Sarg.

Species of hawthorn

Crataegus rufula, or Crataegus × rufula, known as the rusty hawthorn or rufous mayhaw, is a shrub or small tree of the south eastern United States. It is one of several species of hawthorn with fruits known as "mayhaws", which are harvested for use in making mayhaw jelly. It is thought to be a hybrid between the other two species of mayhaw.
