= Crataegus texana =

Scientific classification
- Kingdom: Plantae
- Clade: Embryophytes
- Clade: Tracheophytes
- Clade: Spermatophytes
- Clade: Angiosperms
- Clade: Eudicots
- Clade: Rosids
- Order: Rosales
- Family: Rosaceae
- Genus: Crataegus
- Section: Crataegus sect. Coccineae
- Series: Crataegus ser. Molles
- Species: C. texana

Binomial name
- Crataegus texana Buckley

Synonyms
- C. mollis var. texana (Buckley) Lance

Species of hawthorn

Crataegus texana, the Texas hawthorn, is a member of the family Rosaceae. Typically, it is found in the form of a small tree or a large shrub and blooms in early spring, usually in the months of March and April. Flowers of the Texas Hawthorn are white and usually produce small, one-inch, scarlet fruits that are said to resemble tiny red apples. Its twigs are usually armed with thorns that can grow to be about one to three inches long.

== Description ==
=== Vegetative characteristics ===
Crataegus texana is a perennial tree that grows to be about 25 feet tall and has long, sharp thorns. It has shiny, dark green leaves that can grow to be between 0.75 and 1.5 inches long. Its simple leaves have toothed leaf margins with a parallel veination. Their leaves are ovate in shape, acute at the apex, and cuneate at the base.

=== Generative characteristics ===
Flowers of Crataegus texana grow in flat-topped clusters of five white petals to be about 0.50-0.75 inches wide. It blooms in early spring and develops a round, fleshy, red fruit that is actually a pome, a fleshy fruit that has an outer thickened layer with a central core that contains seeds located inside a capsule.

== Distribution and habitat ==
Crataegus texana is a native species to the United States. It has a limited range, growing in only nine or ten counties of the coastal plain and south-central Texas regions. It can be found in the rich bottomlands and river bottoms in the Gulf Prairies and marshes and in rich sandy clay loams of the Post Oak Savannah and Rio Grande Plains. Crataegus texana usually grows in bottomland soil near an intermittent water source. It can, however, be found to grow in fencerows as well as in areas with heavy deciduous shrub and vine growth. It has a moderate heat tolerance and needs only a modest amount of water. It can grow in areas with partial sunlight and has adaptable soil requirements. Crataegus texana is a deciduous tree meaning that it sheds its leaves every year.

== Uses ==
The edible fruits are sometimes cooked into jams and jellies. Also, upon distillation, the Texas hawthorn can be used to make liquors. Mostly, however, birds depend on its fruit for survival through the winter months, and some mammals, such as squirrels, opossums, and raccoons, also savor them. Crataegus texana is also of special value to native bees. It is recognized by pollination ecologists as attracting large numbers of native bees.
