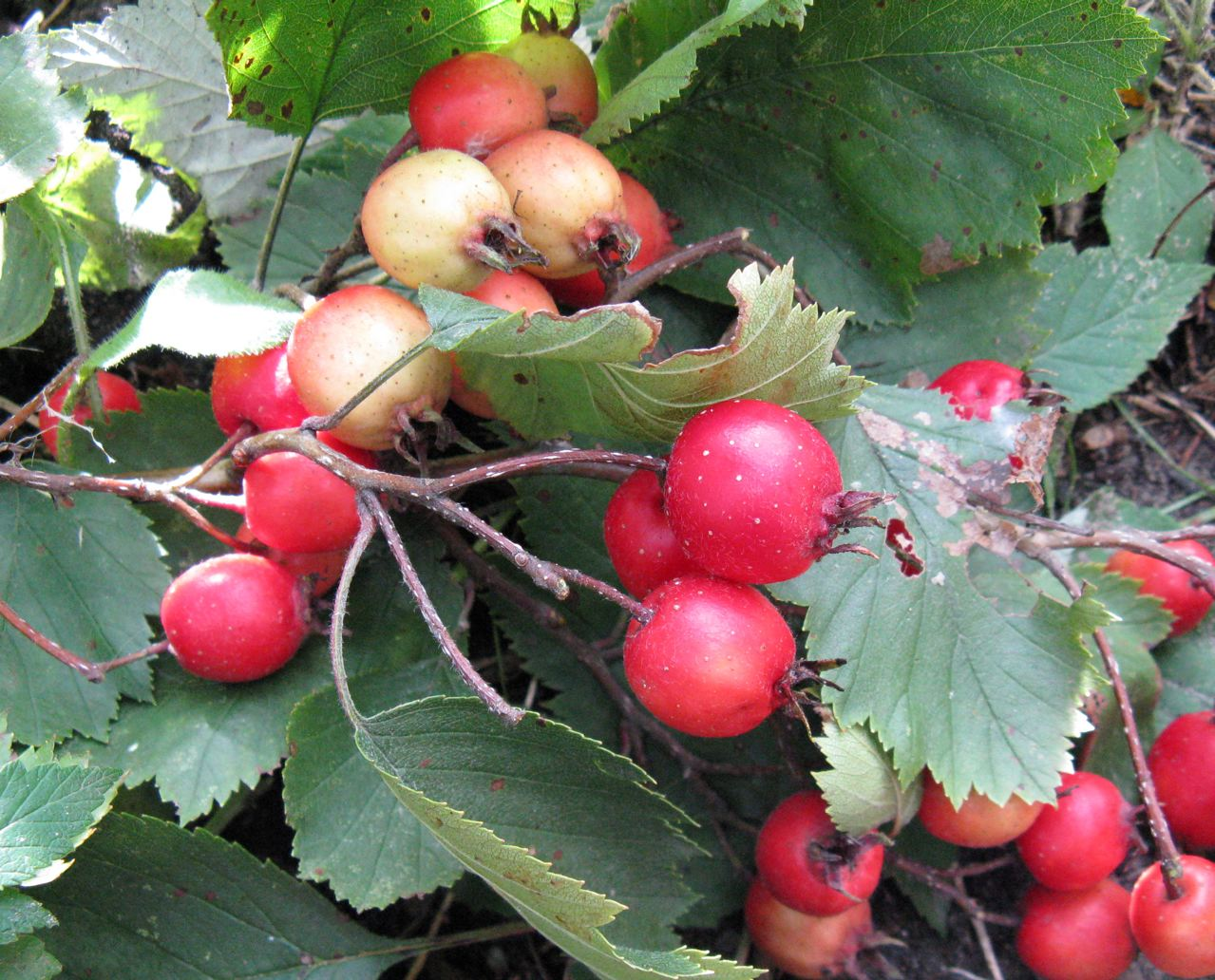

Conservation status
- Least Concern (IUCN 3.1)

Scientific classification
- Kingdom: Plantae
- Clade: Embryophytes
- Clade: Tracheophytes
- Clade: Spermatophytes
- Clade: Angiosperms
- Clade: Eudicots
- Clade: Rosids
- Order: Rosales
- Family: Rosaceae
- Genus: Crataegus
- Section: Crataegus sect. Coccineae
- Series: Crataegus ser. Molles
- Species: C. submollis

Binomial name
- Crataegus submollis Sarg.

Synonyms
- C. arnoldiana Sarg.; C. canadensis Sarg.; C. champlainensis Sarg.

= Crataegus submollis =

Species of hawthorn

Crataegus submollis, known as the northern downy hawthorn, northern red haw, Quebec hawthorn, or hairy cockspurthorn, is a species of hawthorn that grows to about 7 m in height and typically carries large crops of red fruit.

This species is closely related to C. mollis, but the two species have separate native ranges. Amongst other differences between these two species, C. mollis has approximately 20 stamens, whereas C. submollis has approximately 10 stamens per flower. Crataegus submollis is native to north-eastern North America, and has been introduced in Europe.

The thorns are usually numerous and up to 7 cm in length.

== Images ==
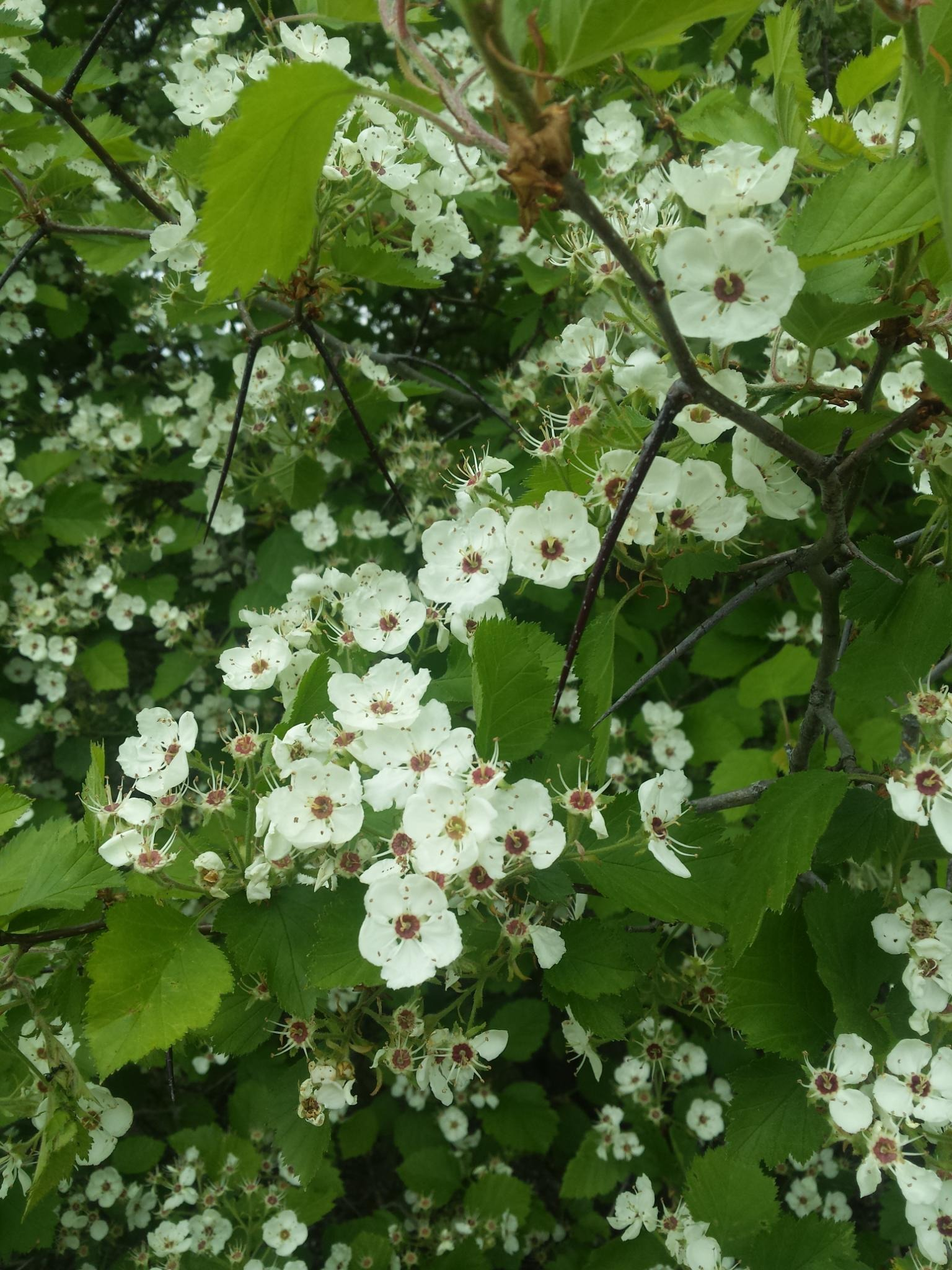
Flowers
