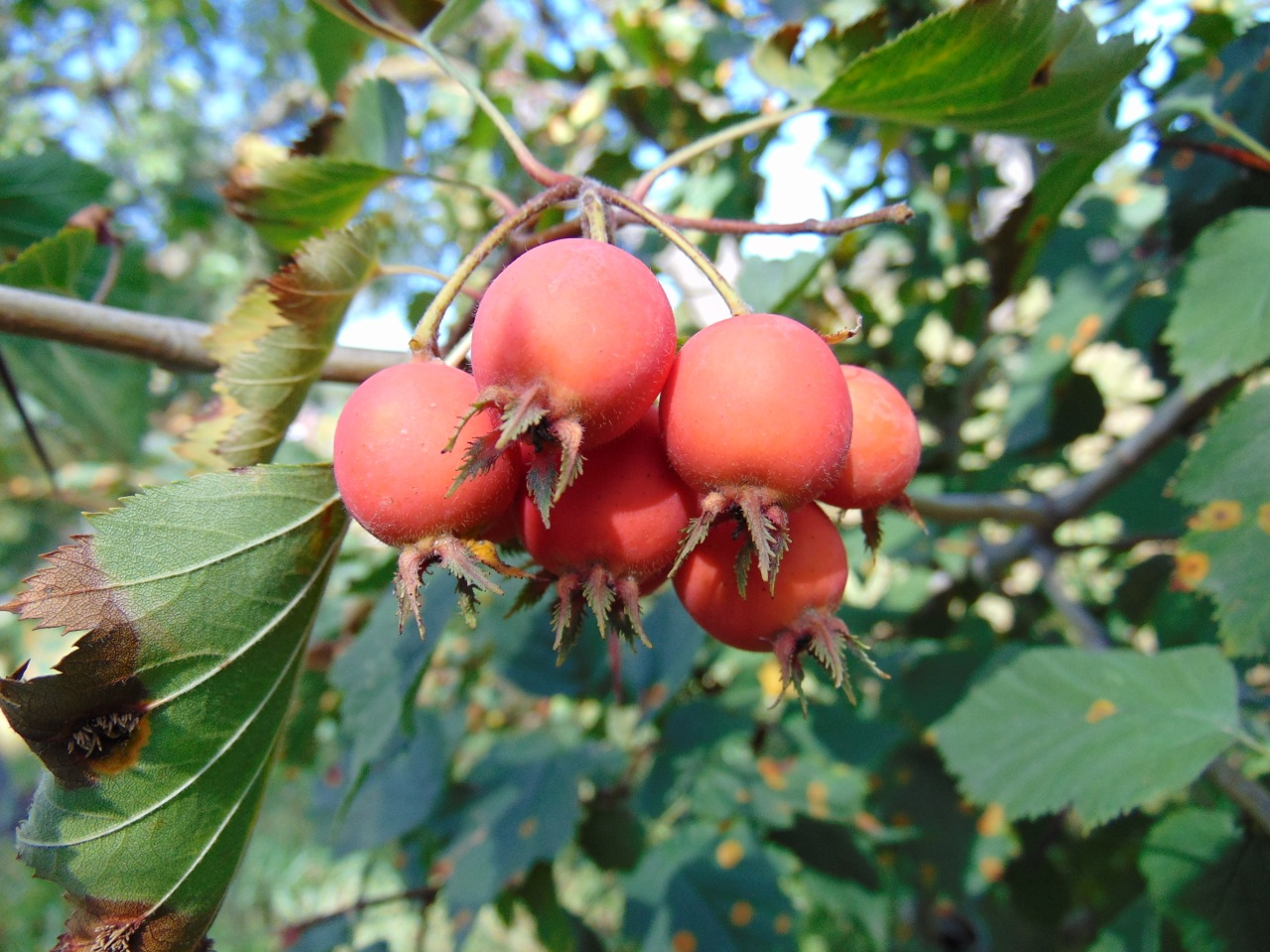

Conservation status
- Data Deficient (IUCN 3.1)

Scientific classification
- Kingdom: Plantae
- Clade: Tracheophytes
- Clade: Angiosperms
- Clade: Eudicots
- Clade: Rosids
- Order: Rosales
- Family: Rosaceae
- Genus: Crataegus
- Section: Crataegus sect. Coccineae
- Series: Crataegus ser. Molles
- Species: C. pennsylvanica

Binomial name
- Crataegus pennsylvanica Ashe

Synonyms
- C. tatnalliana Sarg.

= Crataegus pennsylvanica =

Species of hawthorn

Crataegus pennsylvanica, known as the Pennsylvania thorn, is a species of hawthorn native to Delaware, New York, North Carolina, Ontario, Ohio, and Pennsylvania, that grows to about 8 m in height. The mature trees have few thorns.

This species has often been confounded with C. mollis, but the two species have separate native ranges except for an area of overlap in northeastern Ohio.

== Images ==
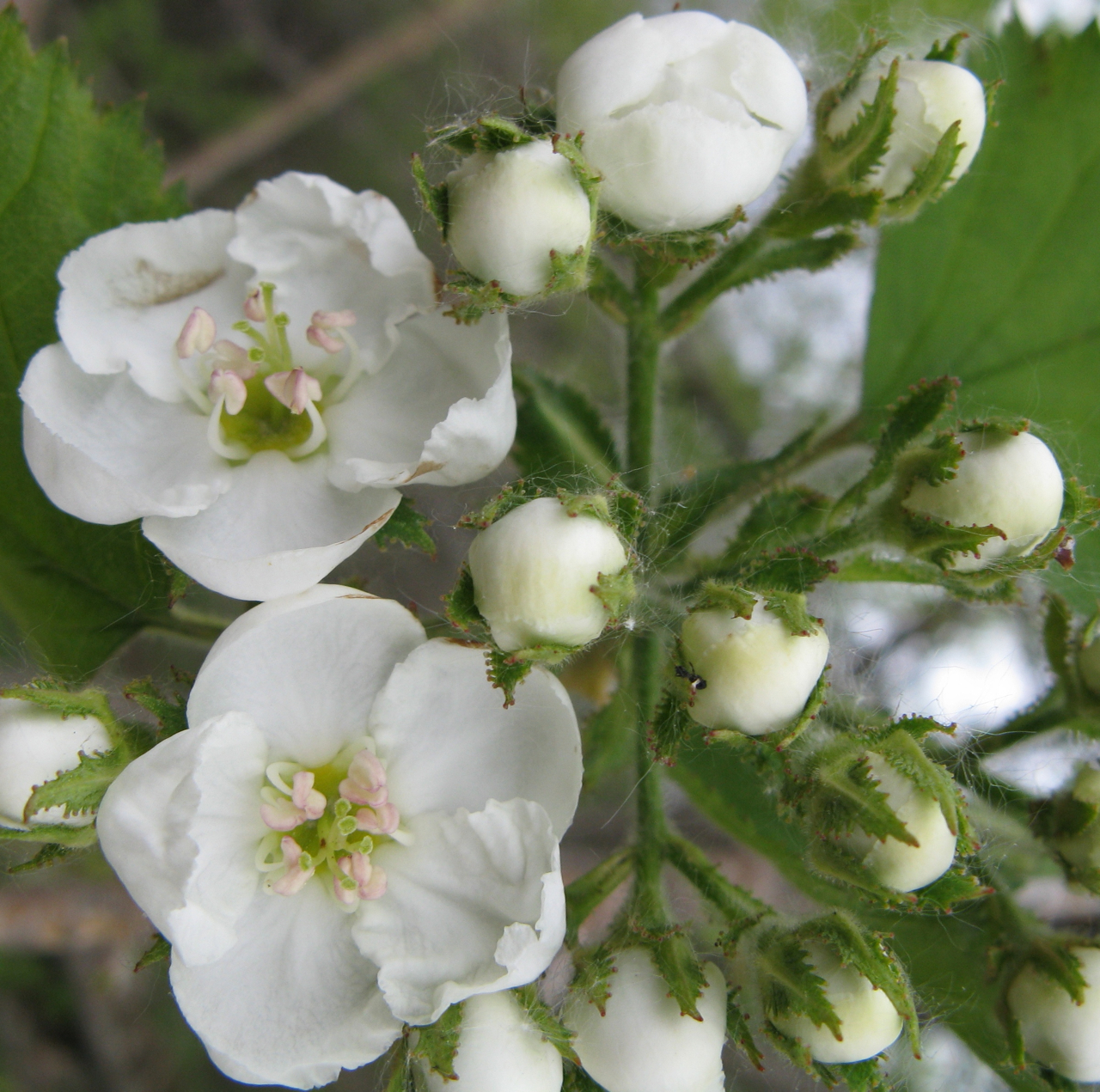

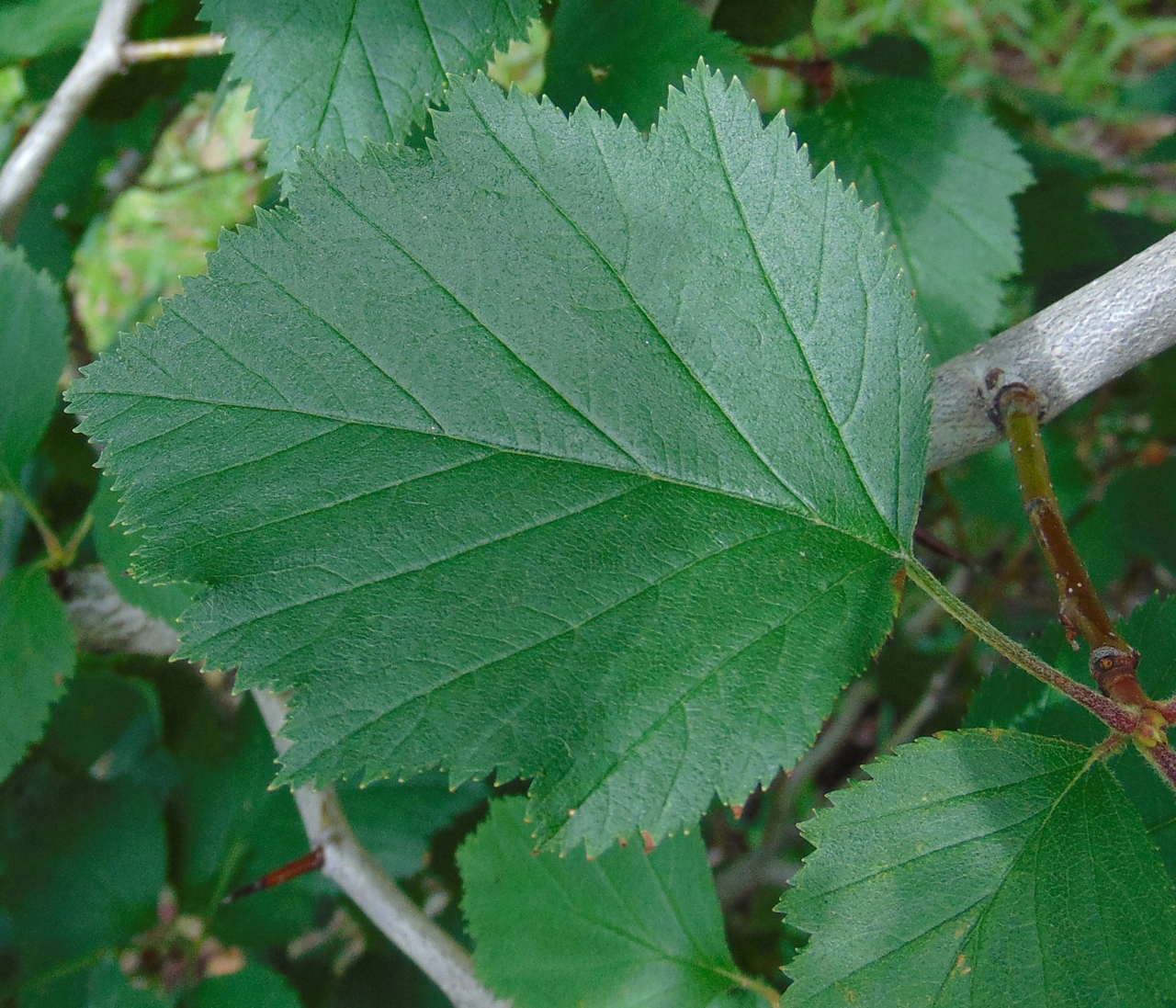
