= Crataegus aprica =

Conservation status
- Least Concern (IUCN 3.1)

Scientific classification
- Kingdom: Plantae
- Clade: Tracheophytes
- Clade: Angiosperms
- Clade: Eudicots
- Clade: Rosids
- Order: Rosales
- Family: Rosaceae
- Genus: Crataegus
- Section: Crataegus sect. Coccineae
- Series: Crataegus ser. Apricae
- Species: C. aprica

Binomial name
- Crataegus aprica Beadle

Synonyms
- Crataegus shallotte Ashe; Crataegus sororia Beadle; Crataegus consanguinea Beadle; Crataegus segnis Beadle; Crataegus abdita Beadle; Crataegus annosa Beadle; Crataegus arrogans Beadle; Crataegus egregia Beadle; Crataegus exilis Beadle; Crataegus galbana Beadle; Crataegus limata Beadle; Crataegus tristis Beadle; Crataegus valida Beadle; Crataegus visenda Beadle; Crataegus sororia var. segnis (Beadle) Lance; Crataegus sororia var. visenda (Beadle) Lance

Species of hawthorn

Crataegus aprica is a species of hawthorn native to the southeastern United States. It is a bush with small leaves and fruit that go through an apricot-coloured stage before becoming red.

== See also ==
- List of hawthorn species with yellow fruit
