= Crataegus altaica =

Scientific classification
- Kingdom: Plantae
- Clade: Tracheophytes
- Clade: Angiosperms
- Clade: Eudicots
- Clade: Rosids
- Order: Rosales
- Family: Rosaceae
- Genus: Crataegus
- Section: Crataegus sect. Sanguineae
- Series: Crataegus ser. Altaicae
- Species: C. altaica

Binomial name
- Crataegus altaica (Loud.) Lange

Synonyms
- Crataegus altaica Ledeb. ex Loudon nom. inval.; Crataegus purpurea var. altaica Loudon; Crataegus sanguinea var. incisa Regel; Crataegus sanguinea var. inermis Karelin & Kirilov; Crataegus wattiana var. incisa (Regel) C. K. Schneider

Species of hawthorn

Crataegus altaica is a species of hawthorn. It is sometimes considered to be a synonym of C. wattiana. Crataegus altaica var. villosa is considered to be a synonym of Crataegus maximowiczii.

== See also ==
- List of hawthorn species with yellow fruit
