= Crataegus ser. Pruinosae =

Scientific classification
- Kingdom: Plantae
- Clade: Tracheophytes
- Clade: Angiosperms
- Clade: Eudicots
- Clade: Rosids
- Order: Rosales
- Family: Rosaceae
- Genus: Crataegus
- Section: Crataegus sect. Coccineae
- Series: Crataegus ser. Pruinosae (Sarg.) Rehder

Species of hawthorn

Series Pruinosae is a series within the genus Crataegus that contains at least six species of hawthorn trees and shrubs, native to Eastern North America. They are similar in some respects to series Intricatae. They are very thorny, with medium to large leaves, and hard fruit that are usually pinkish in colour.

== Species ==
The principal species in the series are:

- Crataegus compacta
- Crataegus gattingeri
- Crataegus suborbiculata
- Crataegus formosa
- Crataegus cognata
- Crataegus pruinosa

The Grand Rapids hawthorn, Crataegus × coleae, collected in the area of Grand Rapids, Michigan until the 1940s, appears to be a hybrid with series Anomalae.
