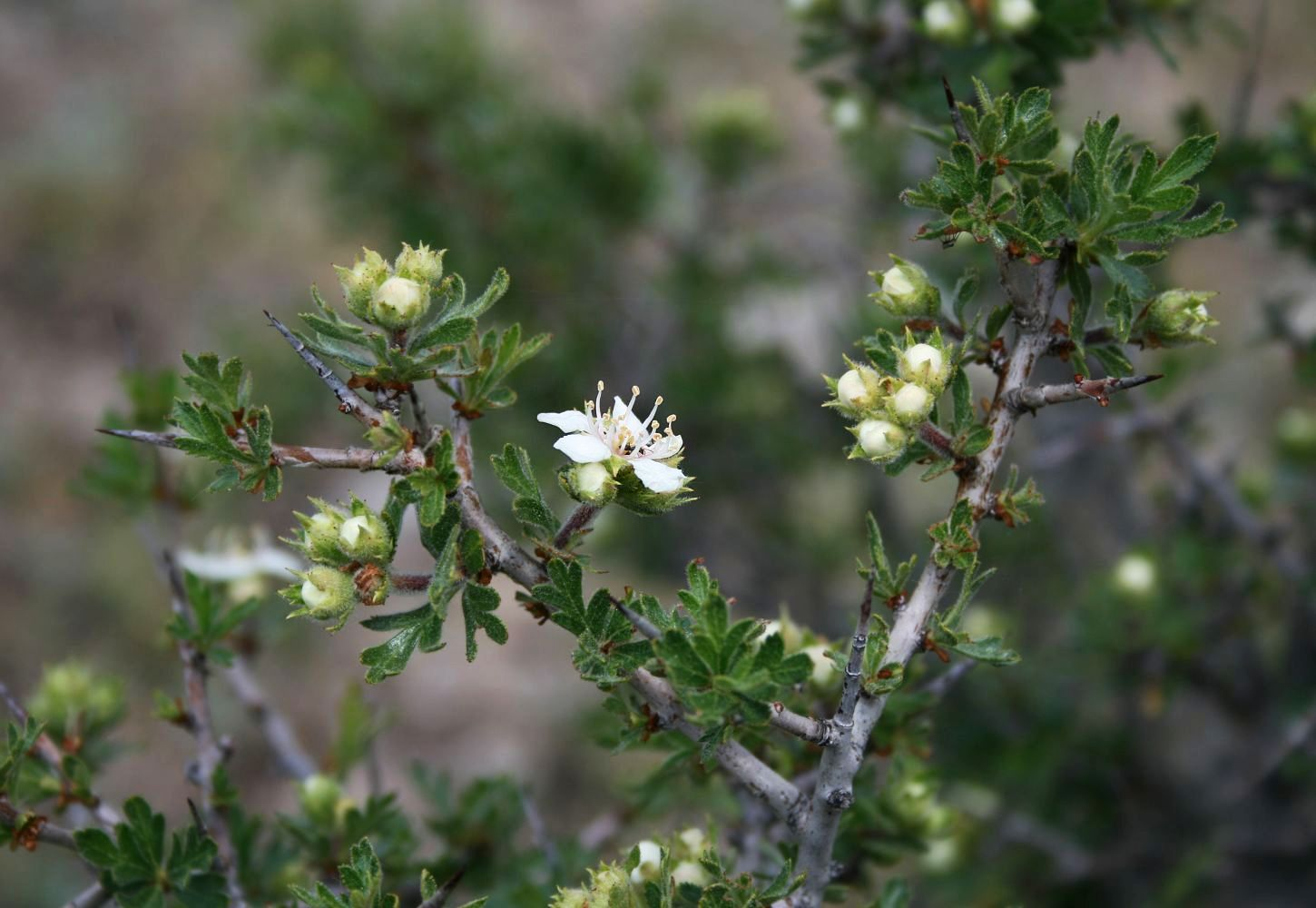

Scientific classification
- Kingdom: Plantae
- Clade: Tracheophytes
- Clade: Angiosperms
- Clade: Eudicots
- Clade: Rosids
- Order: Rosales
- Family: Rosaceae
- Genus: Crataegus
- Species: C. tanacetifolia

Binomial name
- Crataegus tanacetifolia (Poir.) Pers.

Synonyms
- Mespilus tanacetifolia Poir.

= Crataegus tanacetifolia =

Species of fruit and plant

Crataegus tanacetifolia, the tansy-leaved thorn, is a species of hawthorn. It is native to Turkey where it occurs on dry slopes or in rocky places, usually on calcareous rocks.

It is a deciduous tree that grows up to 10 metres in height and 8 metres in width The fruit, is 10–14 mm or up to 25 mm in diameter, orange or rarely red in colour. It can be consumed fresh or cooked.

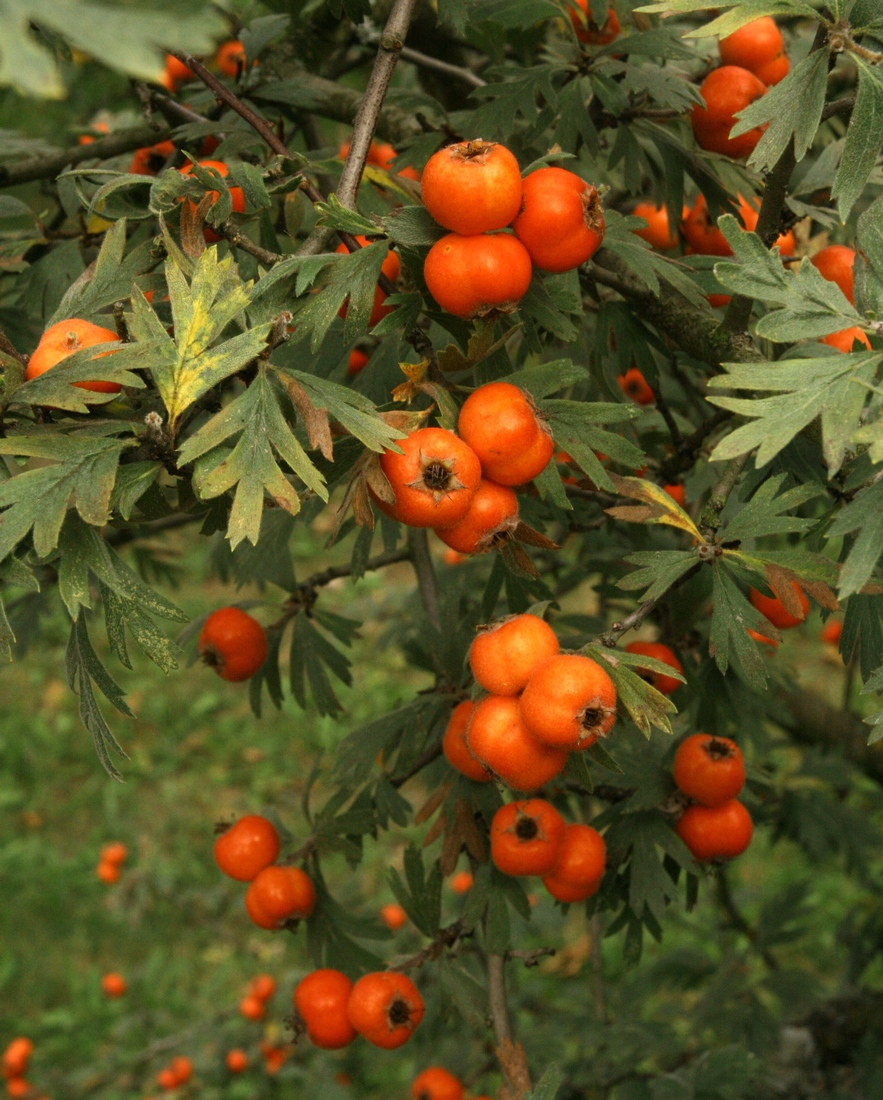

== See also ==
- List of hawthorn species with yellow fruit
