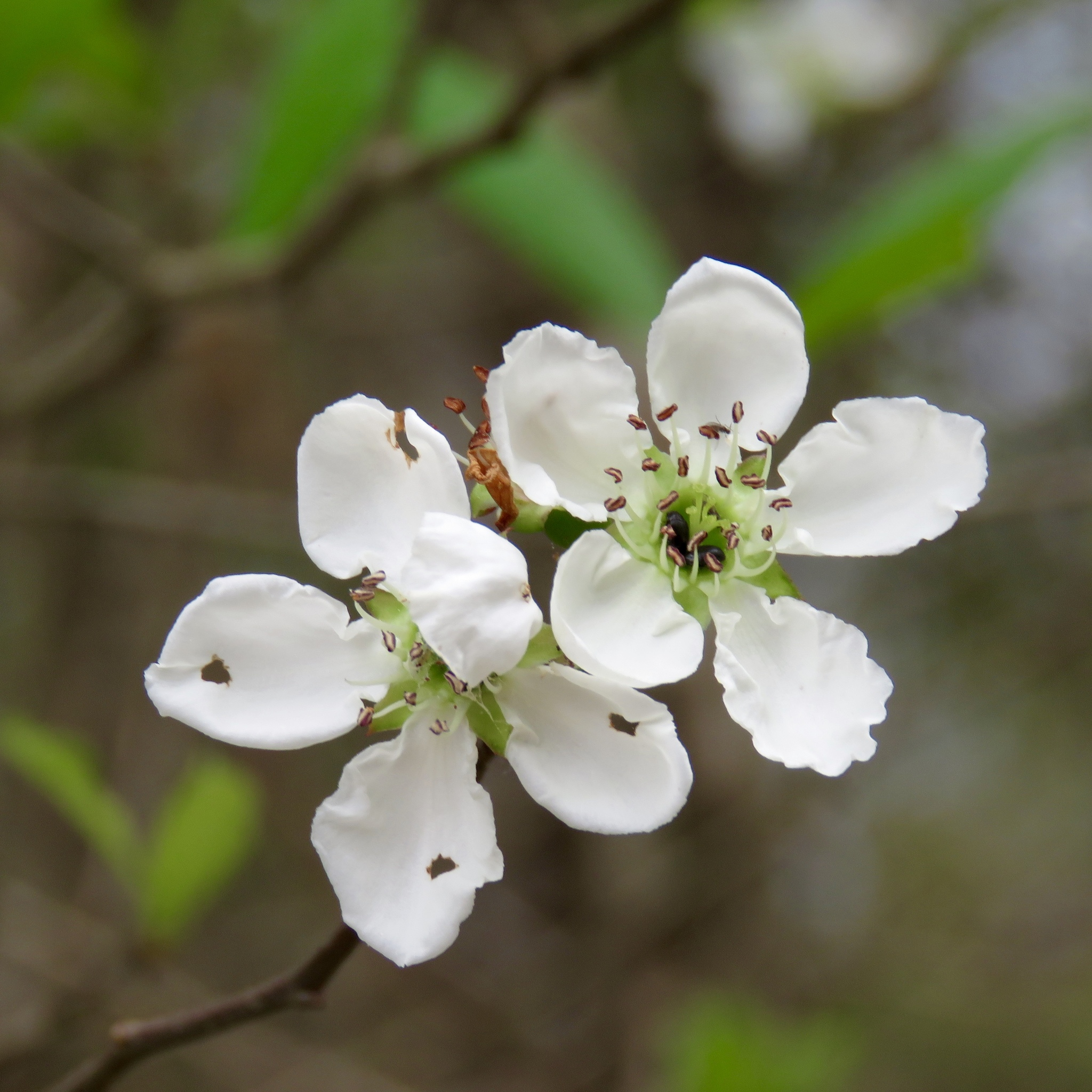

Conservation status
- Least Concern (IUCN 3.1)

Scientific classification
- Kingdom: Plantae
- Clade: Tracheophytes
- Clade: Angiosperms
- Clade: Eudicots
- Clade: Rosids
- Order: Rosales
- Family: Rosaceae
- Genus: Crataegus
- Section: Crataegus sect. Coccineae
- Series: Crataegus ser. Aestivales
- Species: C. opaca

Binomial name
- Crataegus opaca Hooker & Arn.

= Crataegus opaca =

Species of hawthorn

Crataegus opaca, known as the western mayhaw, is a shrub or small tree of the southern United States. It is one of several species of hawthorn with fruits known as "mayhaws".

== Description ==
Crataegus opaca can be characterized as either a small tree or large shrub, with typical height ranging from 12–36 feet (3.7–11.0 m). It has a tall and narrow trunk with a rounded crown and spiny branches. It has oval, dark green leaves and when in bloom, clusters of pink or white flowers. Its fruits are relatively large and have a cranberry-red color when ripe. Blooms usually appear between February and March, and the fruit ripens from May to June.

== Habitat ==
This species prefers wet, rich, and acidic soils, and is located in low woods, creeks, and river bottoms, often in standing water. Its native distribution ranges from Alabama west to Texas, and north to Arkansas.

== Uses ==
The fruits, known as mayhaws, are commonly used to make jams, preserves, and jellies. While the fruits are bitter raw, the jelly produced from them is highly prized for its flavor.
