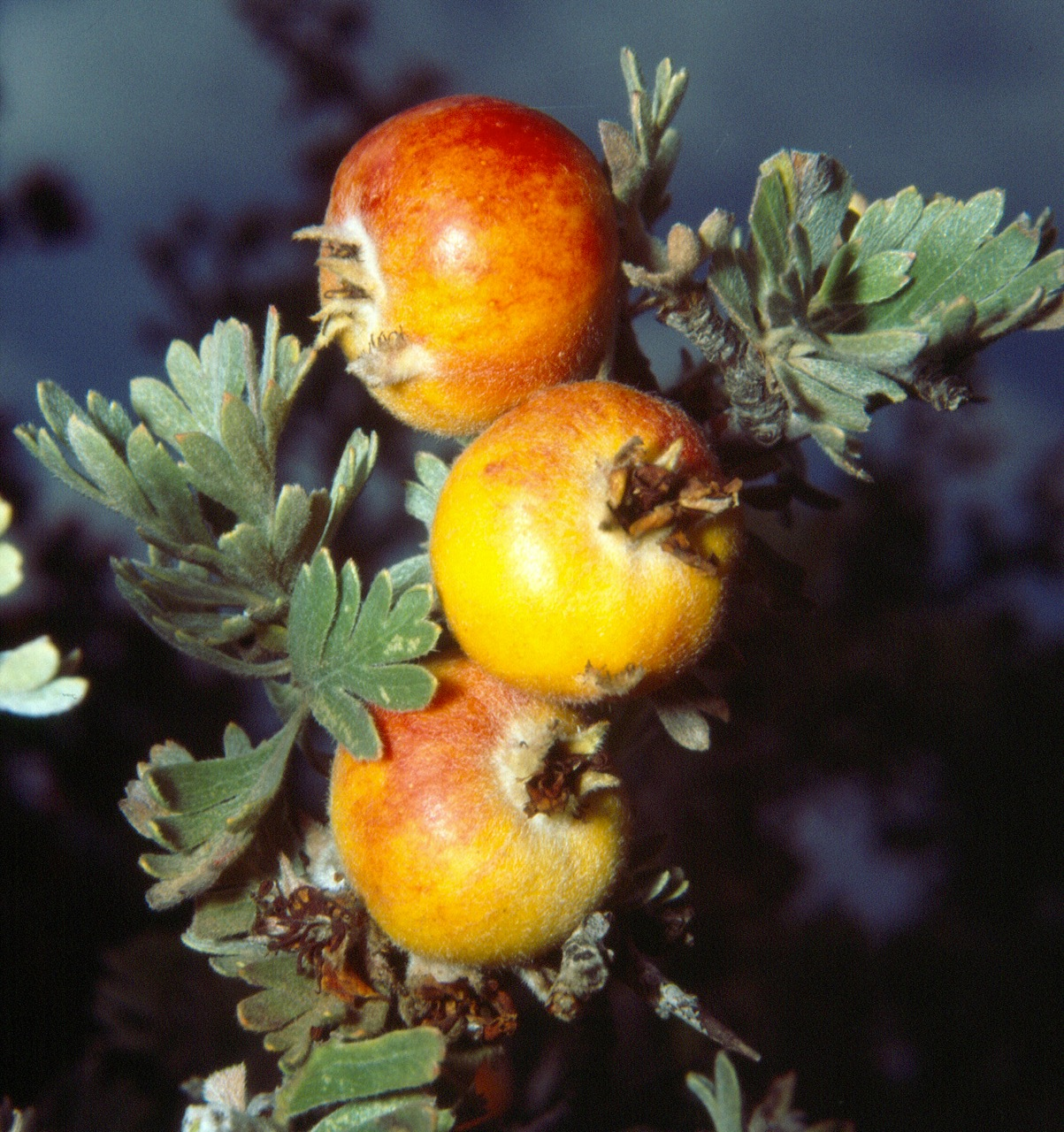

Conservation status
- Least Concern (IUCN 3.1)

Scientific classification
- Kingdom: Plantae
- Clade: Tracheophytes
- Clade: Angiosperms
- Clade: Eudicots
- Clade: Rosids
- Order: Rosales
- Family: Rosaceae
- Genus: Crataegus
- Species: C. pycnoloba

Binomial name
- Crataegus pycnoloba Boiss. & Heldr.

= Crataegus pycnoloba =

Species of plant in the family Rosaceae

Crataegus pycnoloba is a species of hawthorn in the Rosaceae family. It is native to the mountains of the northern and central Peloponnesus of Greece. The plant is a shrub or rarely a small tree. The fruit are red or dark reddish brown when immature, but later develop a yellow background colour.

== See also ==
- List of hawthorn species with yellow fruit
