= Crataegus scabrifolia =

Conservation status
- Least Concern (IUCN 3.1)

Scientific classification
- Kingdom: Plantae
- Clade: Tracheophytes
- Clade: Angiosperms
- Clade: Eudicots
- Clade: Rosids
- Order: Rosales
- Family: Rosaceae
- Genus: Crataegus
- Species: C. scabrifolia

Binomial name
- Crataegus scabrifolia (Franch.) Rehder

Synonyms
- Pyrus scabrifolia Franchet; Crataegus bodinieri H. Léveillé; C. henryi Dunn

Species of hawthorn

Crataegus scabrifolia is a hawthorn from China that grows at altitudes between 1500 and 3000 m in areas with high rainfall. It is usually a large shrub or small tree, and usually without thorns. The edible fruit are large for a hawthorn, up to 2.5 cm in diameter, red or yellow, and are sold in local markets. The tree is apparently not cultivated outside China.

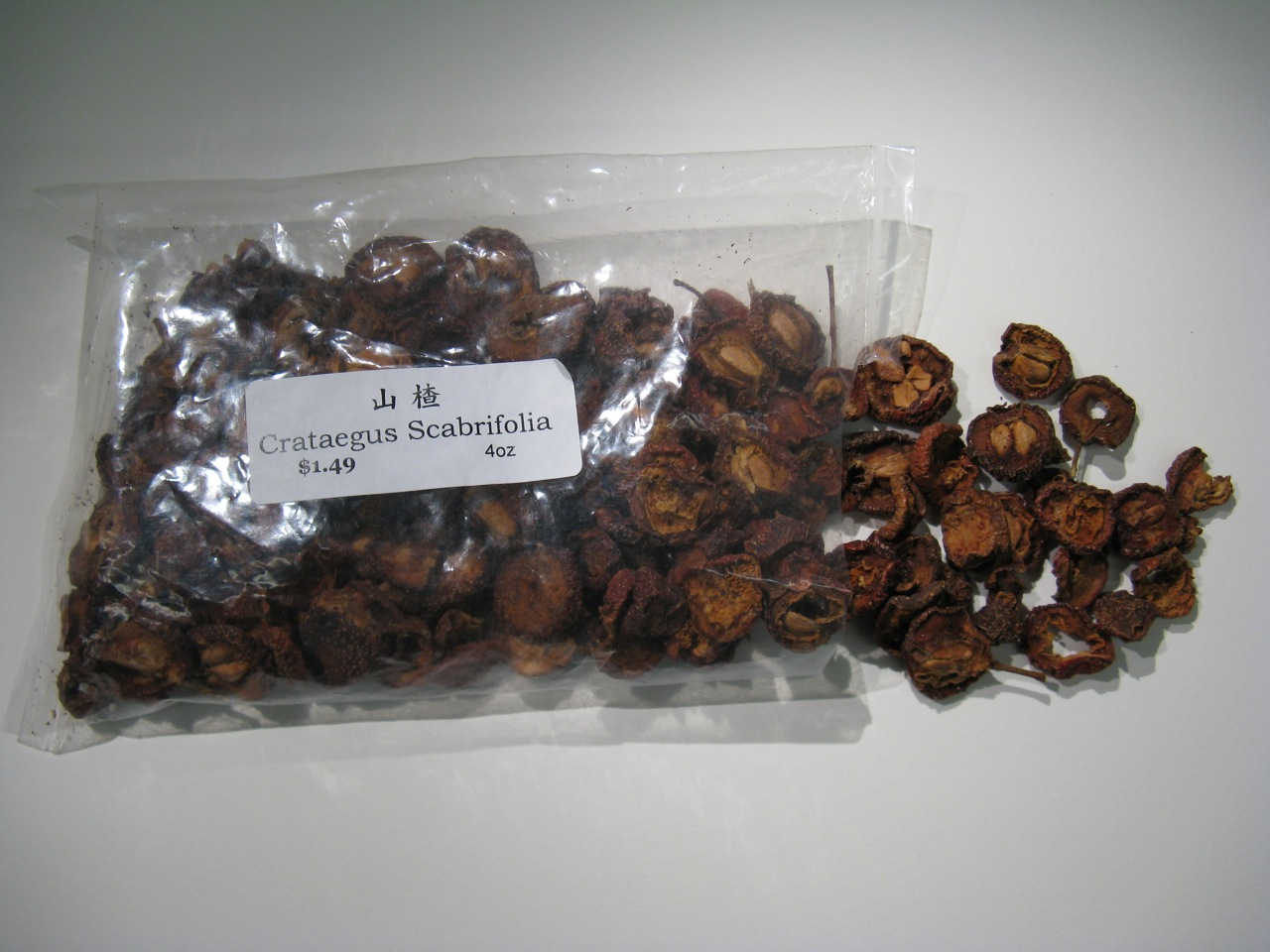
Dried Crataegus fruits labelled "Crataegus scabrifolia"

== See also ==
- List of Crataegus species with yellow fruit
