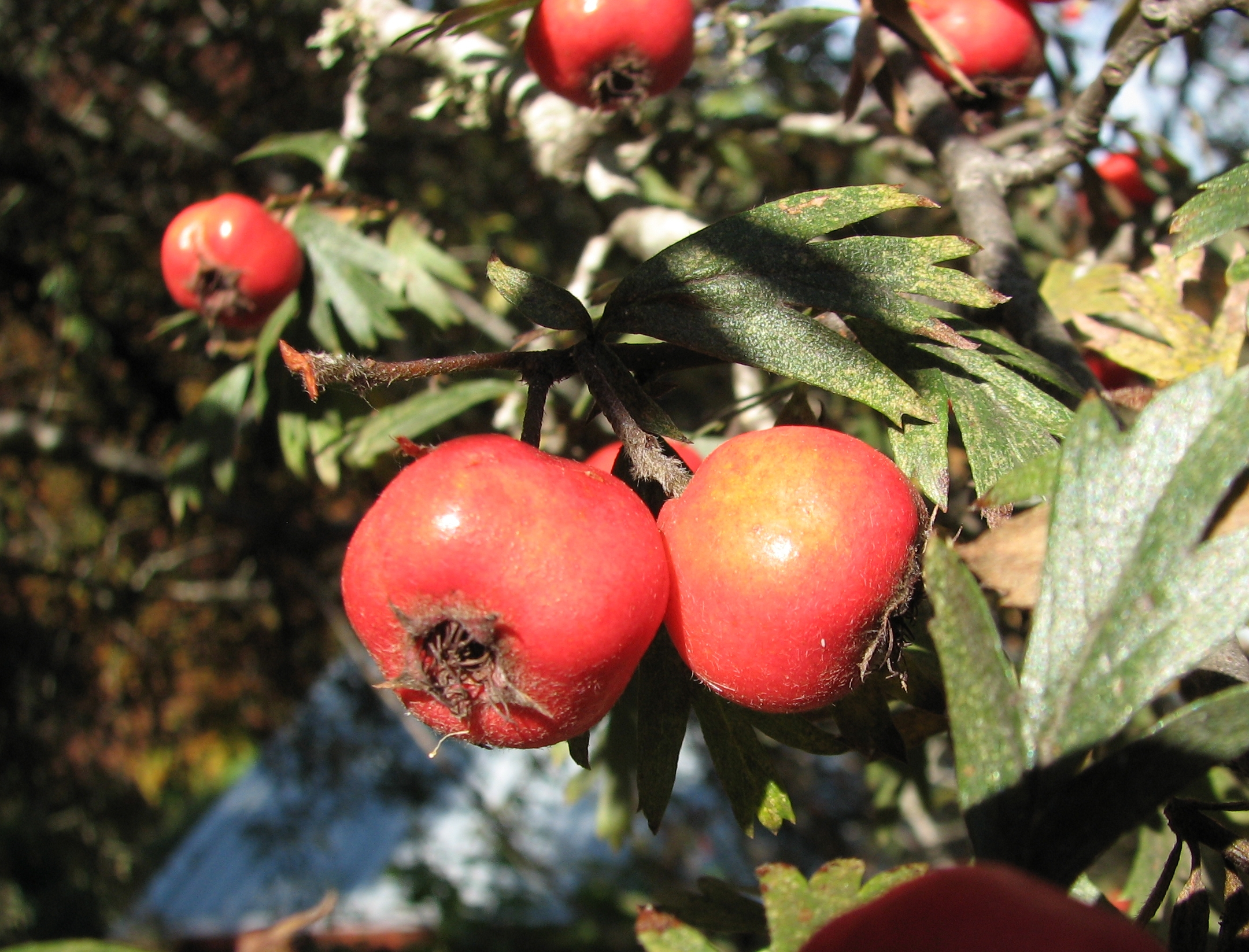
- Crataegus orientalis subsp. orientalis

Scientific classification
- Kingdom: Plantae
- Clade: Tracheophytes
- Clade: Angiosperms
- Clade: Eudicots
- Clade: Rosids
- Order: Rosales
- Family: Rosaceae
- Genus: Crataegus
- Species: C. orientalis

Binomial name
- Crataegus orientalis M.Bieb.

Synonyms
- C. boissieri Willk.; C. × destefani Lojac.; C. eriocarpa Pomel; C. odoratissima Hornem.; C. pojarkovae Kossych; C. pubescens C.Presl non Steud.; C. pycnoloba var. parnassica Diapulis; C. sanguinea Schrad. non Pall.; C. sericella Pojark.; C. szovitsii Pojark.; C. tournefortii Griseb.

= Crataegus orientalis =

Species of hawthorn

Crataegus orientalis, known as oriental hawthorn, is a species of hawthorn native to the Mediterranean region, Turkey, Caucasia, Crimea, and western Iran, with fruits that are orange or various shades of red.

This species is highly variable. Knud Ib Christensen in his monograph divides it into four subspecies:

- C. orientalis subsp. orientalis
- C. orientalis subsp. pojarkovae (Kossych) Byatt has orange fruit.
- C. orientalis subsp. presliana K.I.Chr.
- C. orientalis subsp. szovitsii (Pojarkova) K.I.Chr.

== Uses ==
=== Culinary uses ===
In Caucasia the fruits are either eaten raw or used to make a type of sweet bread.

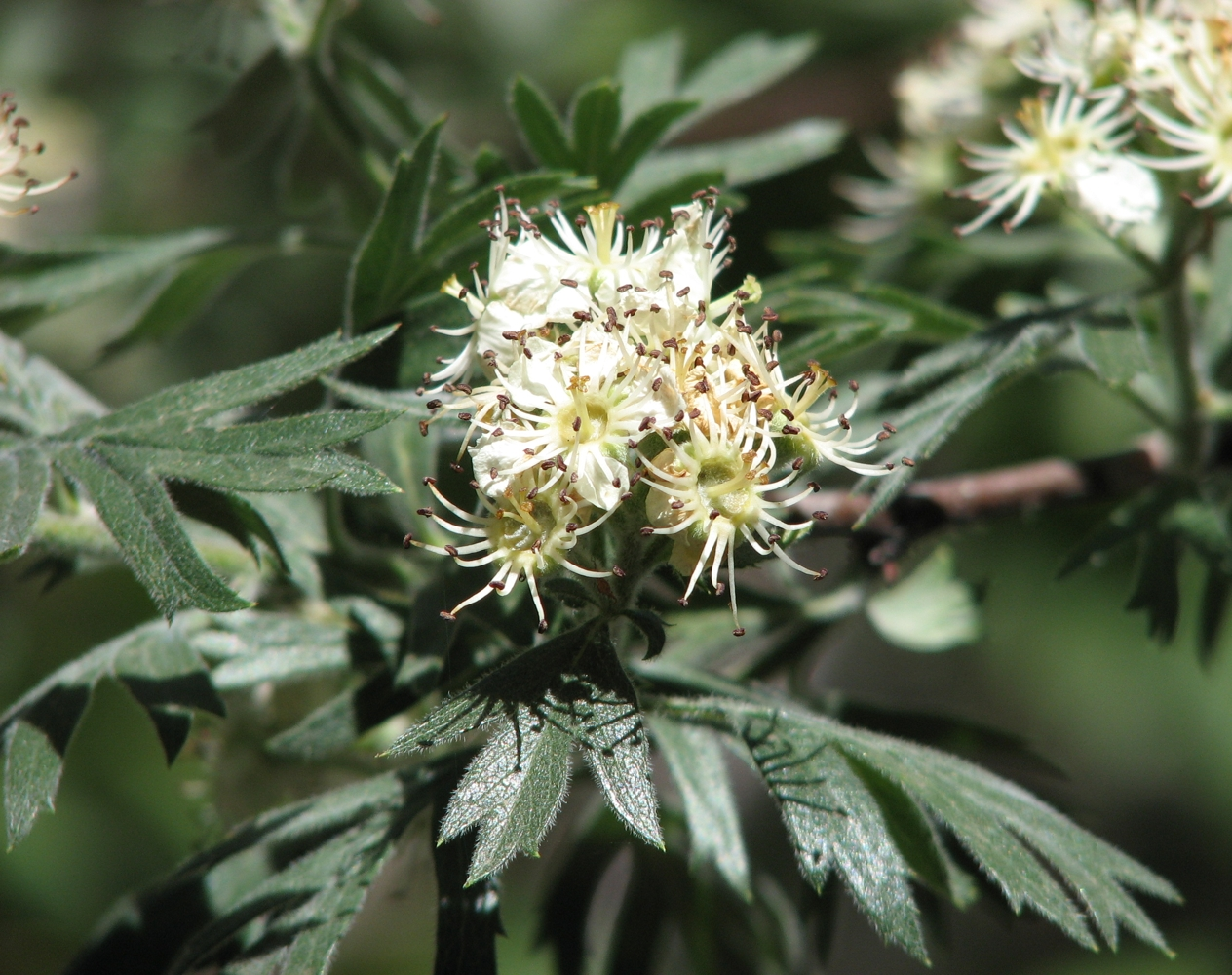
Flowers of C. orientalis subsp. orientalis

== See also ==
- List of hawthorn species with yellow fruit
- Medicinal use of various Crataegus species
