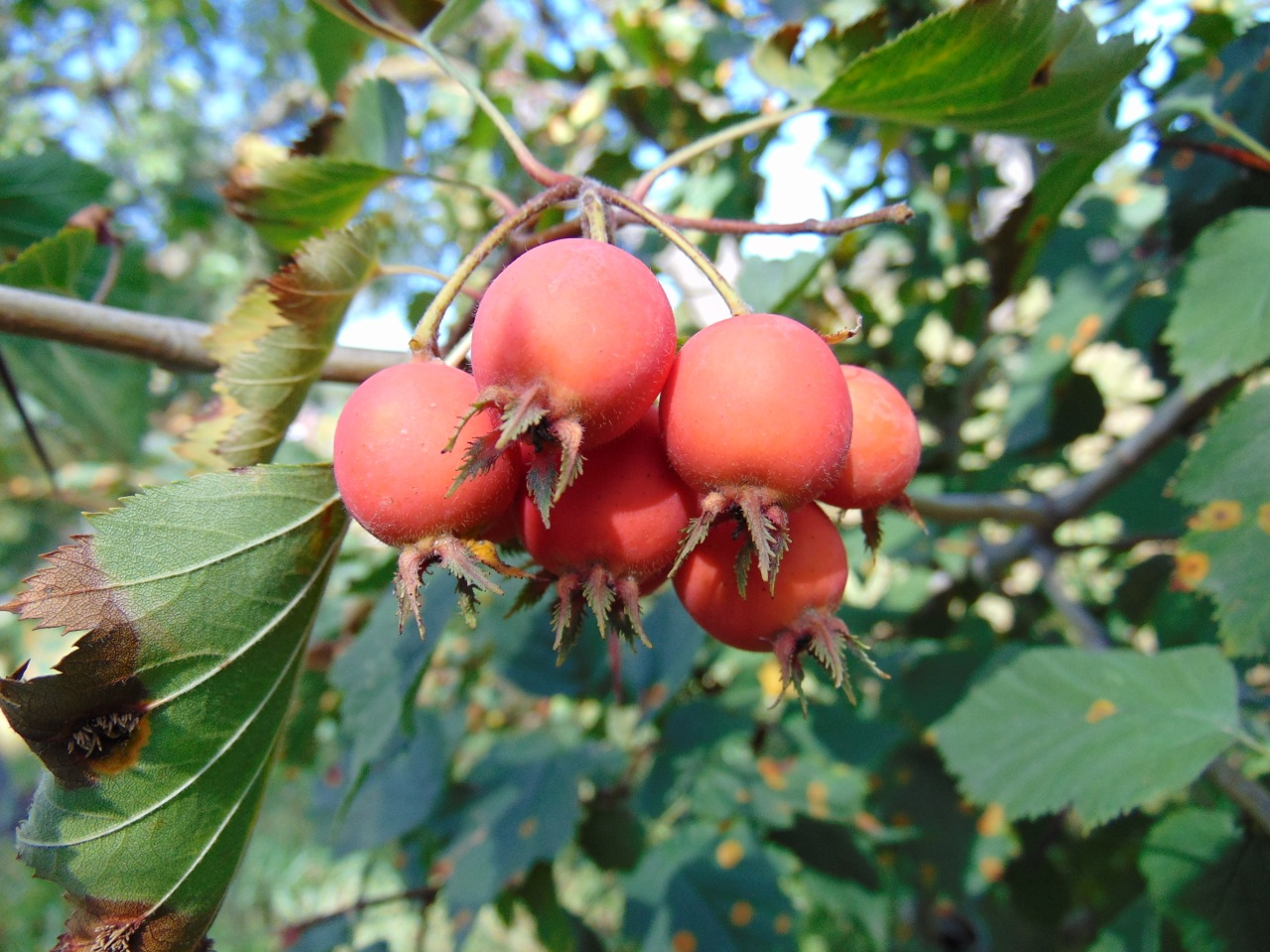
- Crataegus pennsylvanica fruit

Scientific classification
- Kingdom: Plantae
- Clade: Tracheophytes
- Clade: Angiosperms
- Clade: Eudicots
- Clade: Rosids
- Order: Rosales
- Family: Rosaceae
- Genus: Crataegus
- Section: Crataegus sect. Coccineae
- Series: Crataegus ser. Molles (Beadle ex Sarg.) Rehder

= Crataegus ser. Molles =

Species of hawthorn

Series Molles is a series within the genus Crataegus that contains at least six species of hawthorn trees and shrubs, native to Eastern North America. Some of the species are cultivated as ornamental plants. They have relatively large leaves, large flowers, and bloom early for hawthorns. The plant parts are usually hairy, particularly in early growth, and the fruit are generally red (sometimes yellow) and are large for hawthorn fruit (up to 2.5 cm diameter in some species).

== Species ==
The principal species in the series are:

- Crataegus brazoria
- Crataegus lanuginosa
- Crataegus mollis
- Crataegus submollis
- Crataegus pennsylvanica
- Crataegus texana

The following rare local species appear to be hybrid derivatives of series Molles:

- Crataegus × kelloggii
- Crataegus × latebrosa
- Crataegus × dispessa
