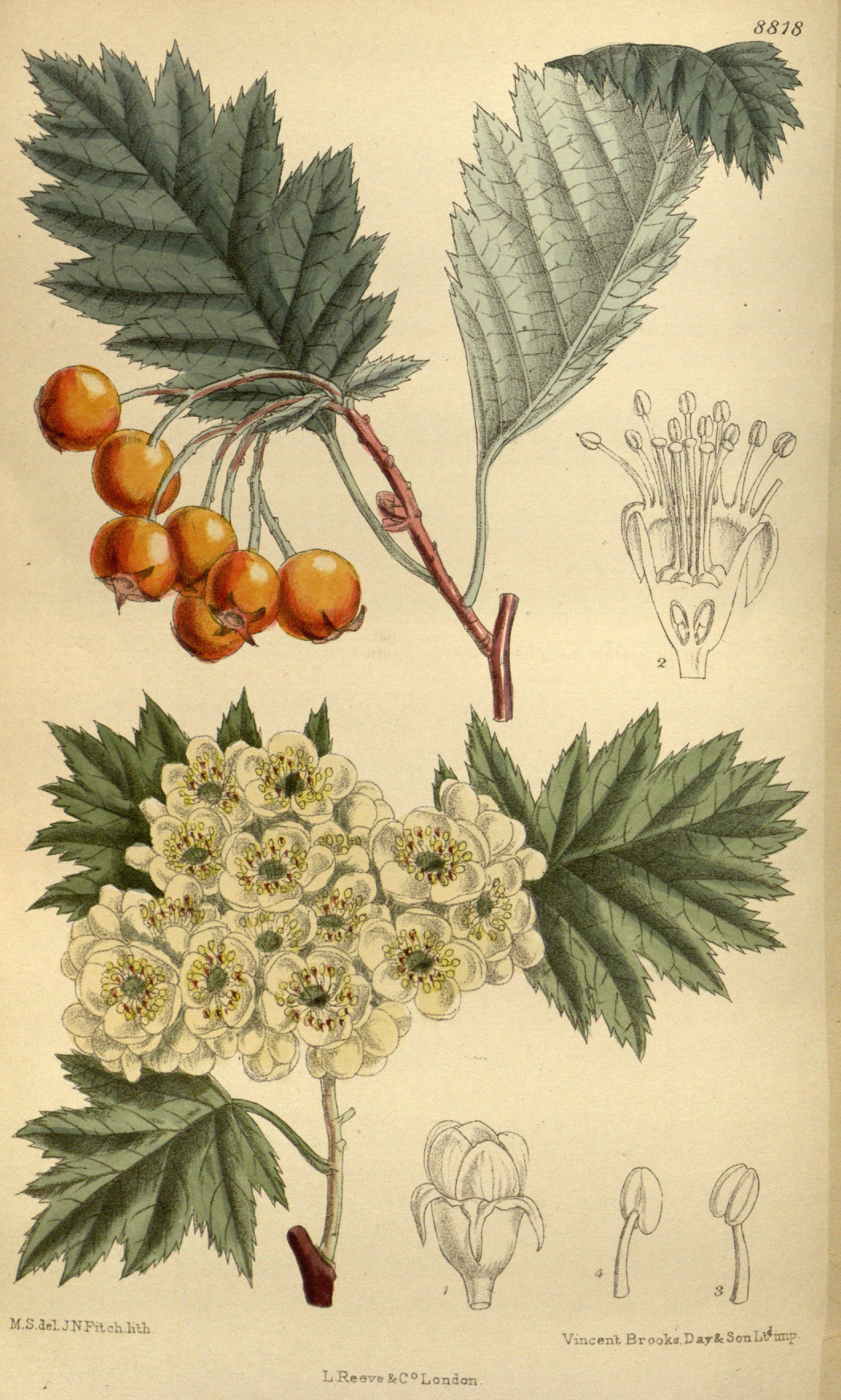
- Illustration from Curtis's Botanical Magazine, 1919

Conservation status
- Least Concern (IUCN 3.1)

Scientific classification
- Kingdom: Plantae
- Clade: Tracheophytes
- Clade: Angiosperms
- Clade: Eudicots
- Clade: Rosids
- Order: Rosales
- Family: Rosaceae
- Genus: Crataegus
- Section: Crataegus sect. Sanguineae
- Series: Crataegus ser. Altaicae
- Species: C. wattiana

Binomial name
- Crataegus wattiana Hemsl. & Lace

= Crataegus wattiana =

Species of hawthorn

Crataegus wattiana, the Altai hawthorn, is an Asian species of hawthorn. The original description states that it has yellow fruit with five stones (pyrenes). Crataegus wattiana var. wattiana has become naturalized in Seattle, in the U.S. state of Washington.

Two varieties are recognized in the 2015 Flora of North America:

- var. wattiana has shallow leaf lobes
- var. incisa C.K.Schneid. leaves are pinnate near the base, and lobed in the upper portion

== See also ==
- List of hawthorn species with yellow fruit
