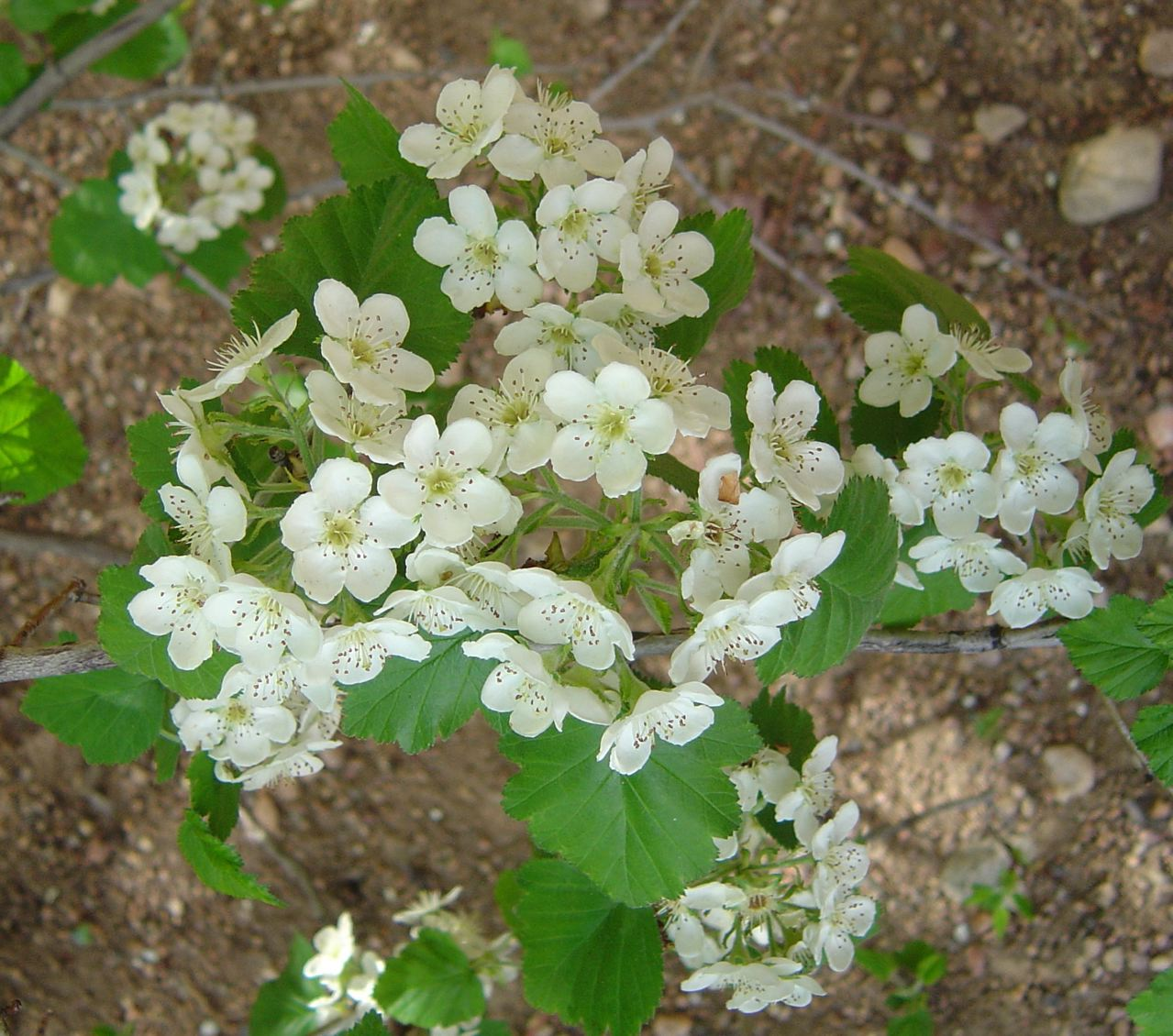

Conservation status
- Least Concern (IUCN 3.1)

Scientific classification
- Kingdom: Plantae
- Clade: Tracheophytes
- Clade: Angiosperms
- Clade: Eudicots
- Clade: Rosids
- Order: Rosales
- Family: Rosaceae
- Genus: Crataegus
- Section: Crataegus sect. Coccineae
- Series: Crataegus ser. Molles
- Species: C. mollis

Binomial name
- Crataegus mollis (Torr. & A.Gray) Scheele

Synonyms
- C. coccinea var. mollis Torrey & A.Gray

= Crataegus mollis =

Species of hawthorn

Crataegus mollis, known as downy hawthorn or red hawthorn, is a species of plant that occurs in eastern North America from southeastern North Dakota east to Nova Scotia and southwest to eastern Texas. The range of this species is from southern Ontario and Michigan to eastern North Dakota and southward to Denison, Texas, and Arizona. This tree inhabits wooded bottomlands, the prairie border, and the midwest savanna understorey.

== Description ==
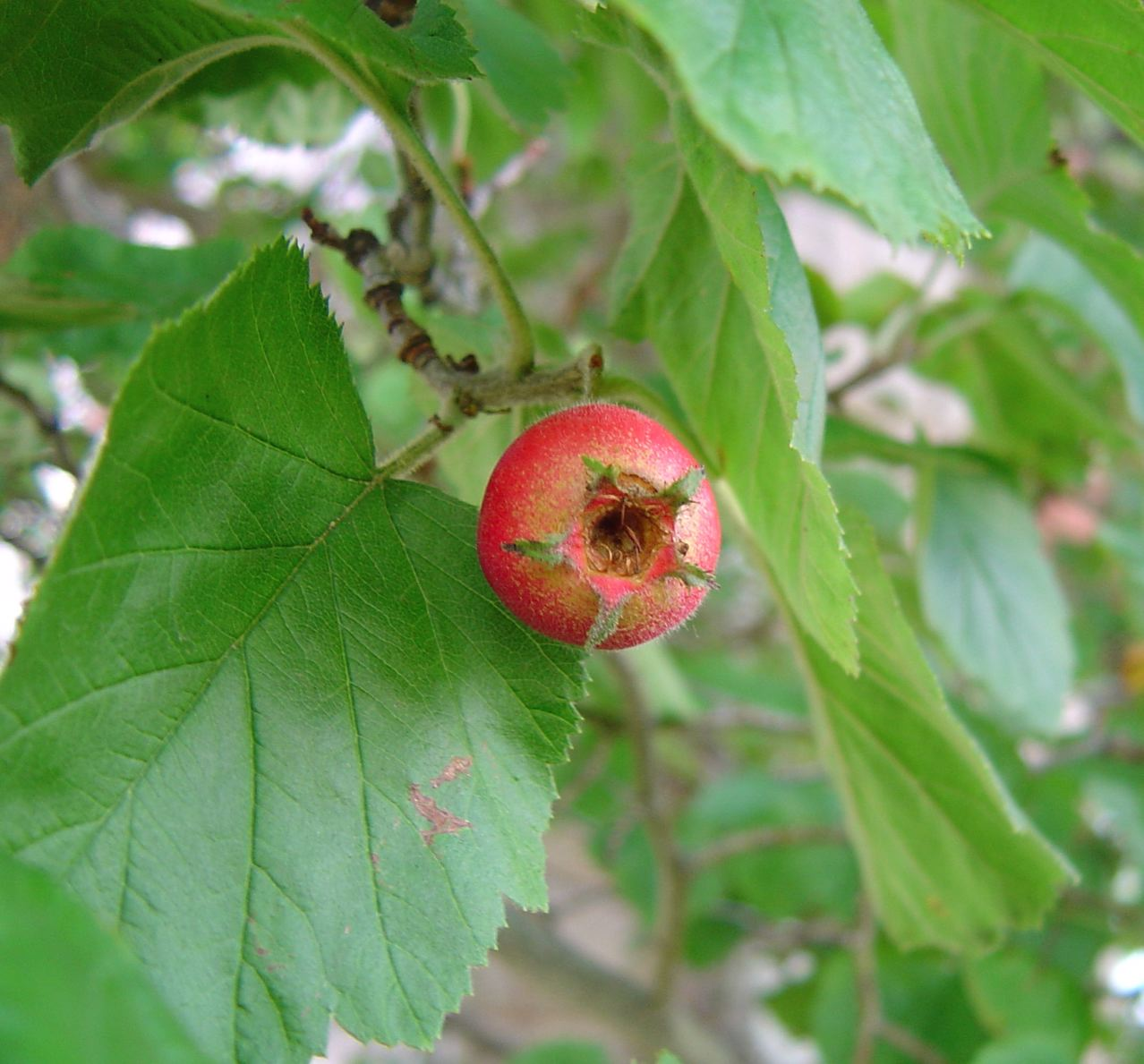
Fruit of Crataegus mollis.

This tree grows to 10–13 m (33–43 ft) high with a dense crown of thorny branches and an ash-grey trunk. The leaves are 5–10 cm (2.0–3.9 in) in length and often drop in late summer due to defoliation by leaf diseases. The tree seems to suffer little from the early loss of its leaves. Among the earliest in the genus to bloom, downy hawthorn also has earliest ripening fruit, which decorate the defoliated tree in late summer and early fall. The large brightly colored edible fruit of the species ripen from the middle of August to early in September. It is closely related to Crataegus submollis, but the two species have separate native ranges. Amongst other differences between these two species, C. submollis has approximately 10 stamens, whereas C. mollis has approximately 20 stamens per flower.

The white flowers are borne in clusters at the end of the branches in spring. The bright red edible fruit ripens in late summer and early fall and falls soon after.

This species is a target of Gypsy moths. Leaf rusts and fire blight are among the many foliage diseases to affect this species. The sharp thorns are a hazard.

This species is uncommon in cultivation.

The seeds of the species usually do not germinate until two to three years after the fruit has ripened as they have a latent period.

== Gallery ==
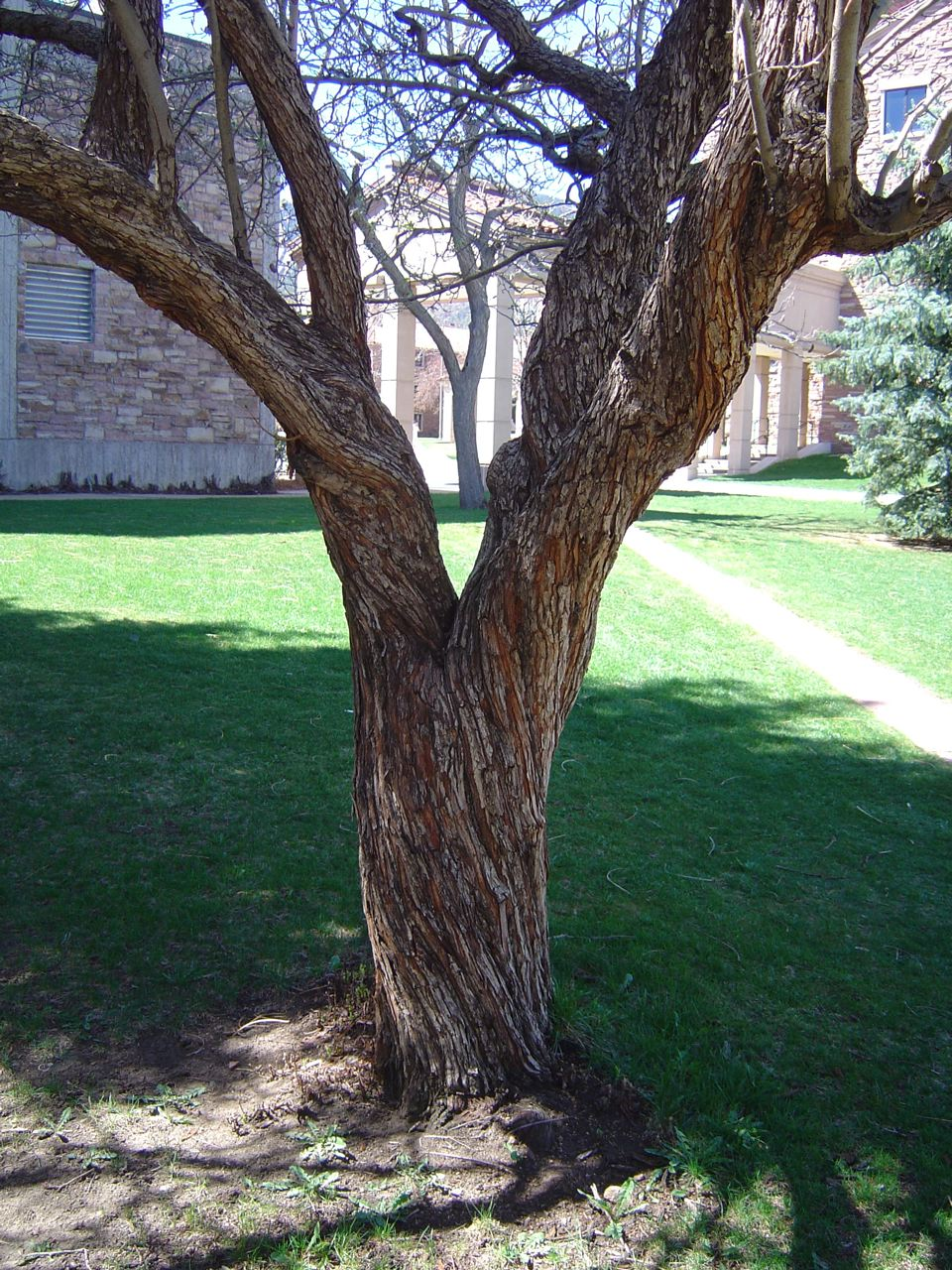

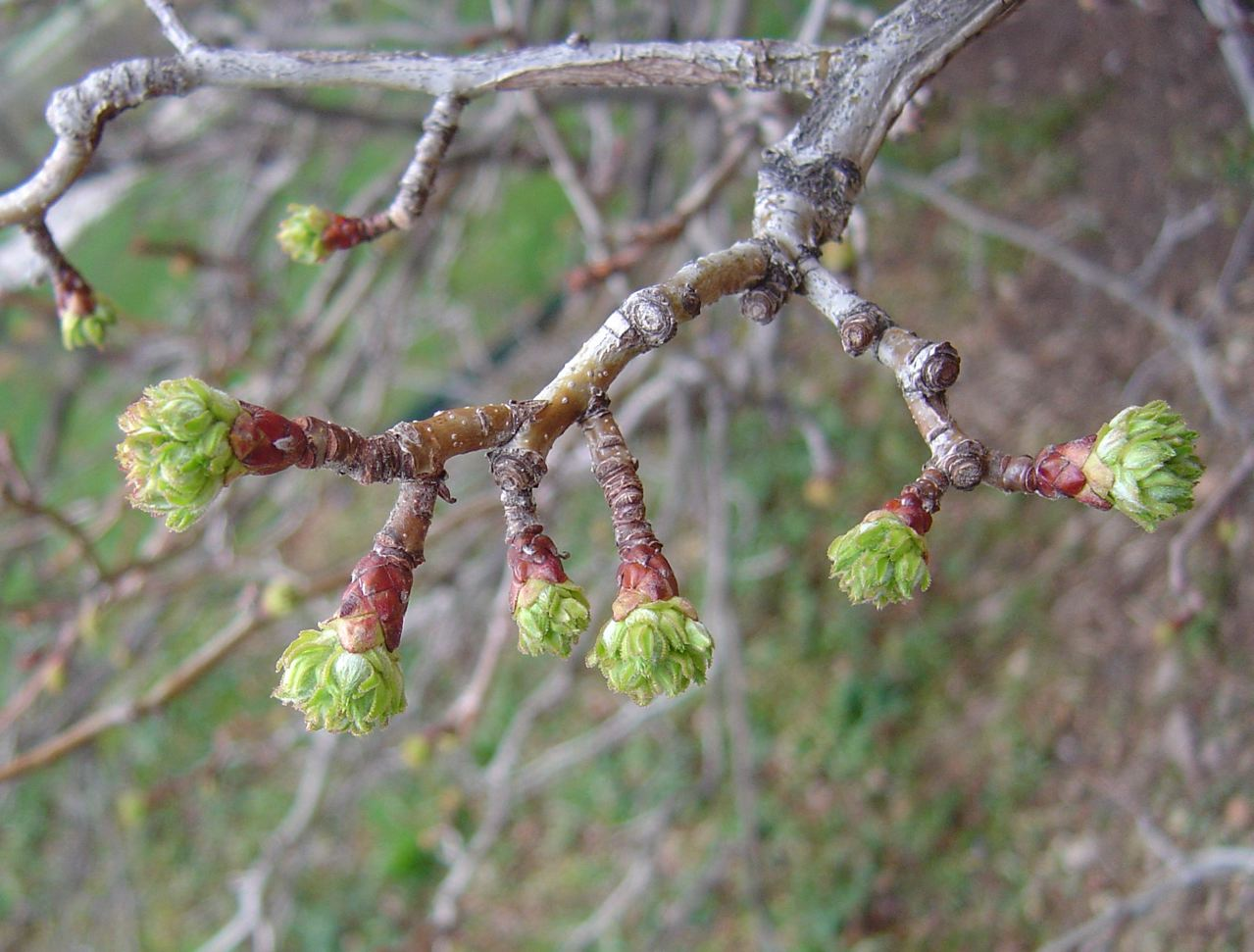
