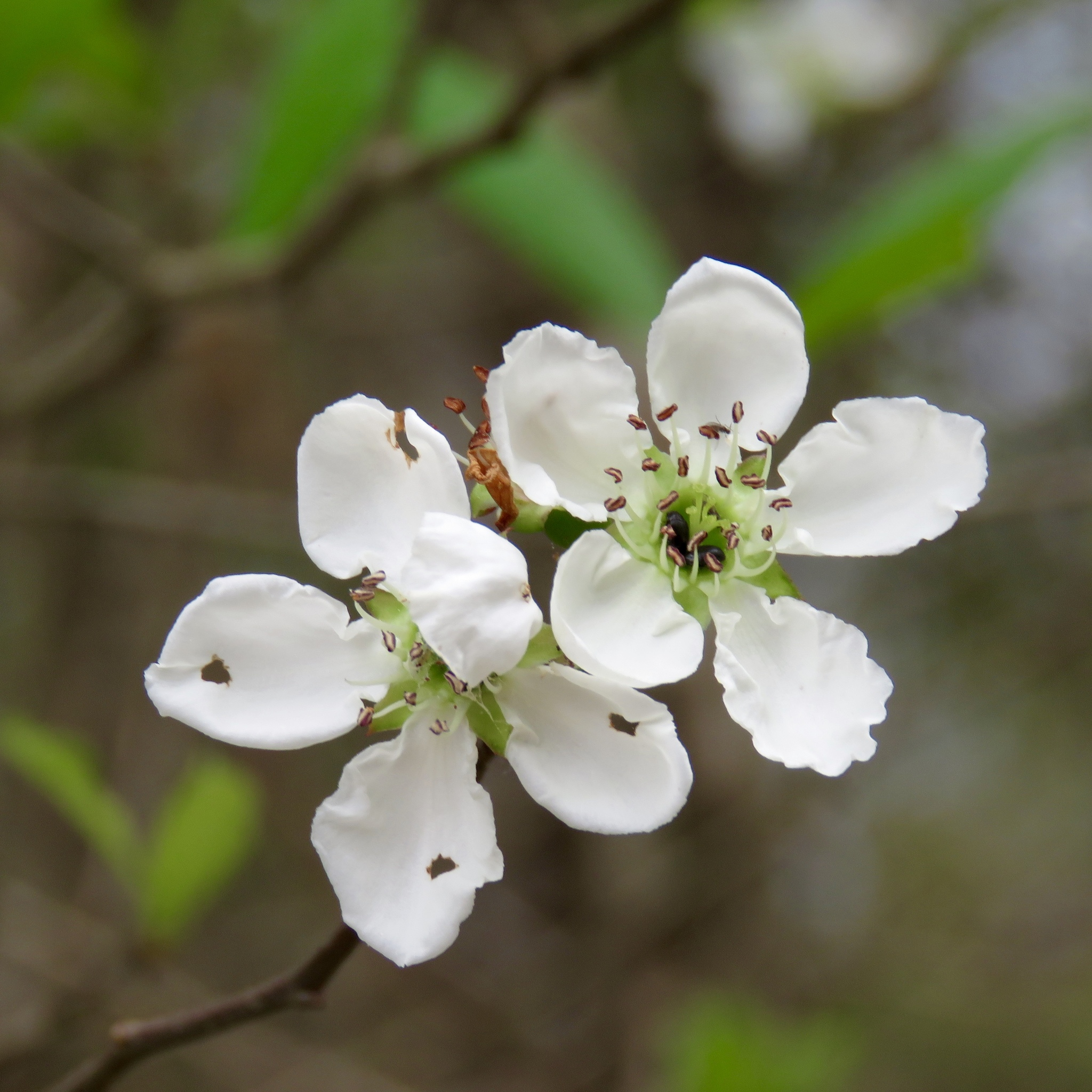
- Crataegus opaca

Scientific classification
- Kingdom: Plantae
- Clade: Tracheophytes
- Clade: Angiosperms
- Clade: Eudicots
- Clade: Rosids
- Order: Rosales
- Family: Rosaceae
- Genus: Crataegus
- Section: Crataegus sect. Coccineae
- Series: Crataegus ser. Aestivales (Sarg. ex C.K.Schneid.) Rehder

Species
- Crataegus aestivalis (Walter) Torr. & A.Gray; Crataegus opaca Hook. & Arn. ex Hook.; Crataegus rufula Sarg.

= Mayhaw =

Species of fruit and plant

Mayhaw is the name given to the fruit of the species of Crataegus series Aestivales that are common in wetlands throughout the southern United States. The principal species are C. aestivalis, the eastern mayhaw, and C. opaca, the western mayhaw.

Mayhaws grow in moist soil in river and creek bottoms under hardwood trees. The fruit is also found in bayous surrounding lakes, such as Caddo Lake on the Texas/Louisiana border. The fruit ripens in late April through May, thus the name may-haw. Mayhaws are often collected out of the water from boats, and the fruit is used to make jelly.

Families would go on outings to collect mayhaws and create stockpiles of the jelly to last throughout the year, but the tradition has declined with the increasing urbanization of the South and the destruction of the mayhaw's native habitat. The fruit has also been cultivated to grow outside of wetlands, and this is increasingly the source of the jelly.

== In culture ==
Many communities associate themselves with the fruit because of its reputation as a celebrated delicacy of Southern U.S. cuisine. For example, Colquitt, Georgia, holds a mayhaw festival in April. Daisetta, Texas; El Dorado, Arkansas; Marion, Louisiana; and Starks, Louisiana, all celebrate a mayhaw festival each May.

The mayhaw is the state fruit tree of Louisiana.
