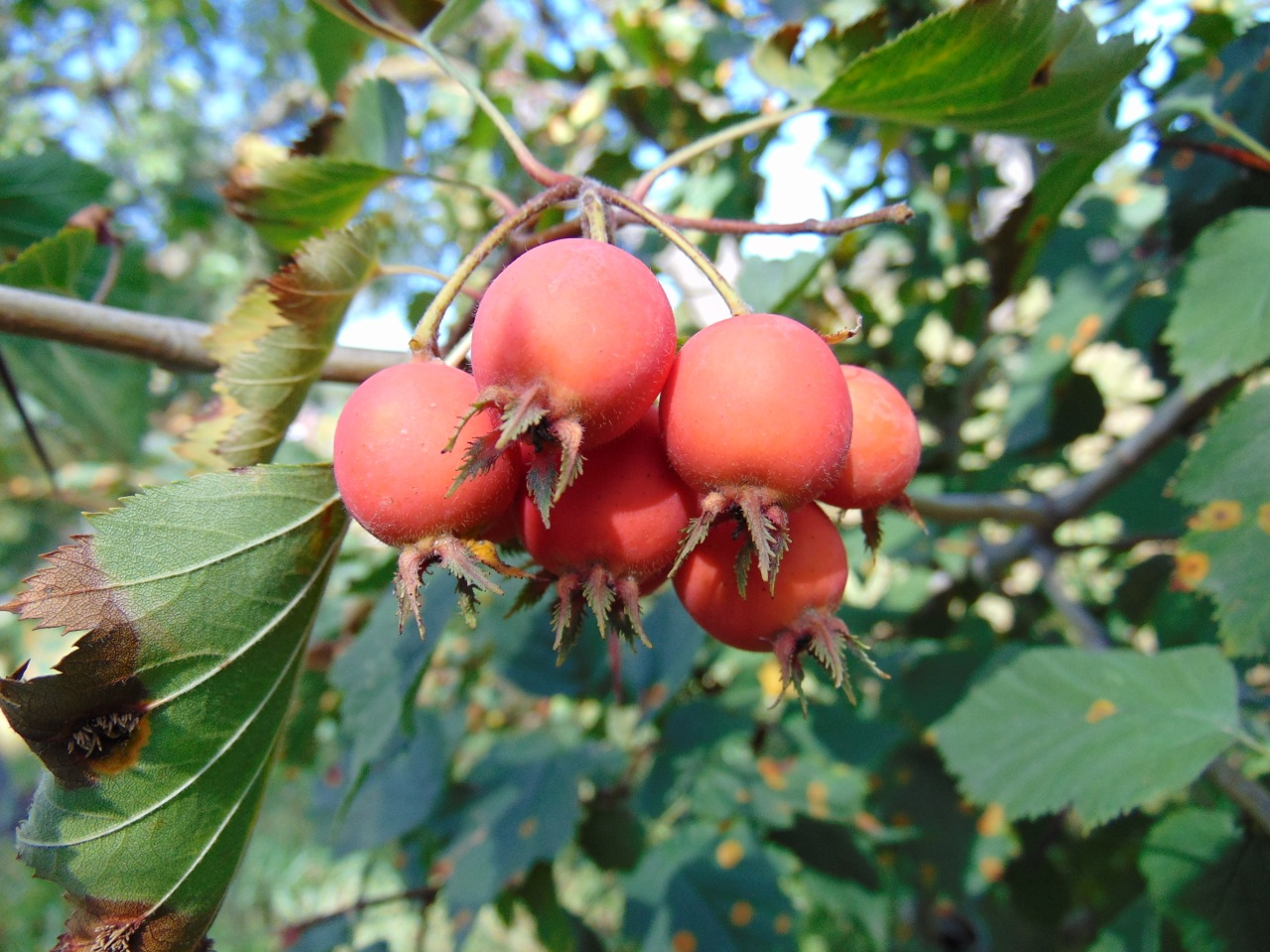
- Crataegus pennsylvanica fruit, series Molles

Scientific classification
- Kingdom: Plantae
- Clade: Tracheophytes
- Clade: Angiosperms
- Clade: Eudicots
- Clade: Rosids
- Order: Rosales
- Family: Rosaceae
- Genus: Crataegus
- Section: Crataegus sect. Coccineae; Loudon

= Crataegus sect. Coccineae =

Species of hawthorn

Section Coccineae is a section within the genus Crataegus that includes the majority of North American hawthorn diversity. It includes at least 20 series as well as some species that have not yet been assigned to series.

== Series ==
Series in section Coccineae include:

- Aestivales
- Apricae
- Bracteatae
- Coccineae
- Crus-galli
- Dilatatae
- Greggianae
- Intricatae
- Lacrimatae
- Madrenses
- Molles
- Parvifoliae
- Populneae
- Pruinosae
- Pulcherrimae
- Punctatae
- Rotundifoliae
- Tenuifoliae
- Triflorae
- Virides

Two more series are sometimes included within section Coccineae:

- Anomalae
- Macracanthae
