= C. digitata =

C. digitata may refer to:

- Callipielus digitata, a moth species found in Chile
- Cardamine digitata, the Richardson's bittercress, a plant species native of Alaska and Canada
- Callirhoe digitata, a wild flower species in the genus Callirhoe
- Crypsotidia digitata, a moth of the family Erebidae
- Cucurbita digitata, the fingerleaf gourd and bitter squash, a flowering plant species native to the southwestern United States and northern Mexico
