= Benjamin Franklin Bush (botanist) =

American botanist and ornithologist

- Born: December 21, 1858; Columbus, Indiana
- Died: February 14, 1937 (aged 78); Independence, Missouri
- Citizenship: American
- Scientific career
- Fields: Botany, ornithology
- Author abbrev. (botany): Bush

Benjamin Franklin "Frank" Bush (December 21, 1858 – February 14, 1937) was an American botanist and ornithologist. He was an expert on the flora of Jackson County, Missouri, and his lifelong research into the plant life of that area made it into one of the best known botanical regions in the United States.

== Early life ==
Bush was born in Columbus, Indiana, in 1858. He moved with his mother Henrietta Bush to Jackson County, Missouri, in 1865, and that area remained his home for the rest of life. While there, Henrietta Bush met and married Robert B. Tindall, a florist who built and operated the first greenhouse in Independence, Missouri.

Bush developed a love of the natural world as a young man by exploring the frontier country of post-Civil War western Missouri. Within a few miles of his home were prairies, dense woods, rocky glades, and small waterways connected to the Missouri River. Young Bush was particularly taken with the calls and songs of the bird species in the area, and he amassed an important collection of bird eggs from the region. He also tracked the behaviors of passenger pigeons, prairie chickens, and Carolina parakeets. But his lifelong interest in birds was always superseded by his interest in plants.

== Flora of Jackson County ==
Bush's interest in the plant life of Jackson County stemmed in part from receiving a copy of Alphonso Wood's Class-Book of Botany as a young man. Trying to identify native species by using the text, he found only a small portion were mentioned. This led to his own eager cataloging of the new species and a robust correspondence relationship with Asa Gray and George Engelmann for instruction. Bush's first catalog of the flora of Jackson County was published in 1882.

In 1886, Samuel Mills Tracy published his Flora of Missouri, which was the first catalog of plant life in the state as a whole. Tracy used Bush's research as the primary source for his information on the plants of Jackson County and the surrounding region.

Around this time, Bush also struck up a friendship with Cameron Mann of Kansas City, and the two undertook several botanical excursions together. They also collaborated on a supplement to Bush's Flora of Jackson County in 1885. Later, Bush began a collaboration with Kenneth Kent Mackenzie, and the two of them produced several papers on plants in Missouri and used their collecting experience from expeditions in the state to publish the Manual of the Flora of Jackson County in 1902.

== Other botanical interests ==
Between 1891 and 1892, Bush was employed to help collect and prepare wood specimens for the exhibit on Missouri forestry at the World's Columbian Exposition in Chicago. He also was employed by the Missouri Botanical Garden to collect plant specimens from the remote areas in the four corners of Missouri: Clark County, Atchison County, McDonald County, and Dunklin County.

Outside of Missouri, he collected extensively in Arkansas, Oklahoma (Indian Territory) and Texas for the Arnold Arboretum and the Missouri Botanical Garden. He also developed a passion for ferns and published the first list of fern species in Texas. Bush edited and distributed three exsiccatae, namely Plants of Missouri (1894 – 1895), Plants of Indian Territory (1894 – 1895) and Plants of Texas (1901).

Bush cultivated relationships with many important botanists, and he spent time collecting with Ernest Jesse Palmer and Arnold Arboretum director Charles Sprague Sargent.

== Personal life ==
In order to support his family, Bush supplemented his income with work outside of botany. He opened a general store near Kansas City in Courtney, Missouri, which he ran for nearly 40 years. He also worked as the postmaster in Courtney during that time. His business was aided by the large number of Mexican and Italian laborers brought into the area by Santa Fe Railway to do maintenance work on the line that ran near Courtney. Through these customers, Bush was able to become conversant in both Spanish and Italian.

== Legacy ==
Bush collected and identified a large number of plants that were new to science in the 19th century. Among them were Quercus arkansana, Hamamelis vernalis, Crataegus missouriensis, Callirhoe bushii, Fraxinus profunda, and Echinacea paradoxa (Bush's purple coneflower). He was also the first to discover corkwood in Missouri. Previously it had only been found in Florida and Texas. The epithet bushii is attached to several species in his honor.

The University of North Carolina Herbarium's website has this to say about Bush: "The many thousands of well-prepared sheets of plants collected by him which have found their way into nearly all the herbaria of the world will be a constant reminder of his work; the large number of plants previously unknown to science which he discovered, and many of which he described, as well as those described by others and bearing his name, will remain a monument to him."

== Selected works ==
- Flora of Jackson County (1882)
- Notes on a list of plants collected in Southeastern Missouri in 1893 (1894)
- The trees, shrubs and vines of Missouri (1895)
- The Lespedezas of Missouri (1902)
- The North American species of Chaerophyllum (1902)
- New plants from Missouri (1902)
- The Missouri Saxifrages (1909)
- The genus Euthamia in Missouri (1918)
- The Missouri Artemisias (1928)
