= Wildflower =

Flower that grows in the wild, not intentionally planted

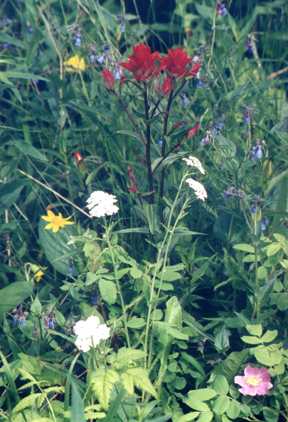
Five wildflower species occupy less than 1,000 cm^{2} in this photo taken on the eastern slope foothills of the Canadian Rocky Mountains in late July. Pink: Alberta wild rose; white: Western yarrow; blue: Bluebells showing both pink (immature) and blue (mature) stages; yellow: Arnica cordifolia (heart-leaved arnica); and red: Red paintbrush

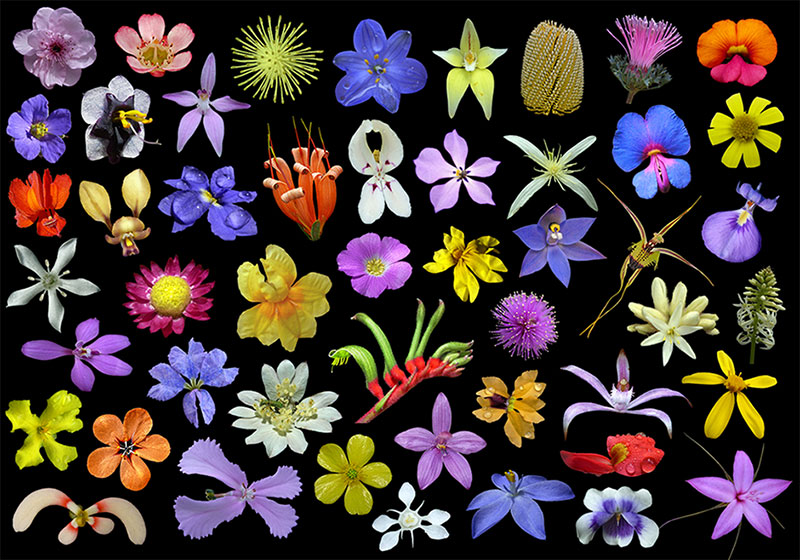
Wildflowers of Western Australia

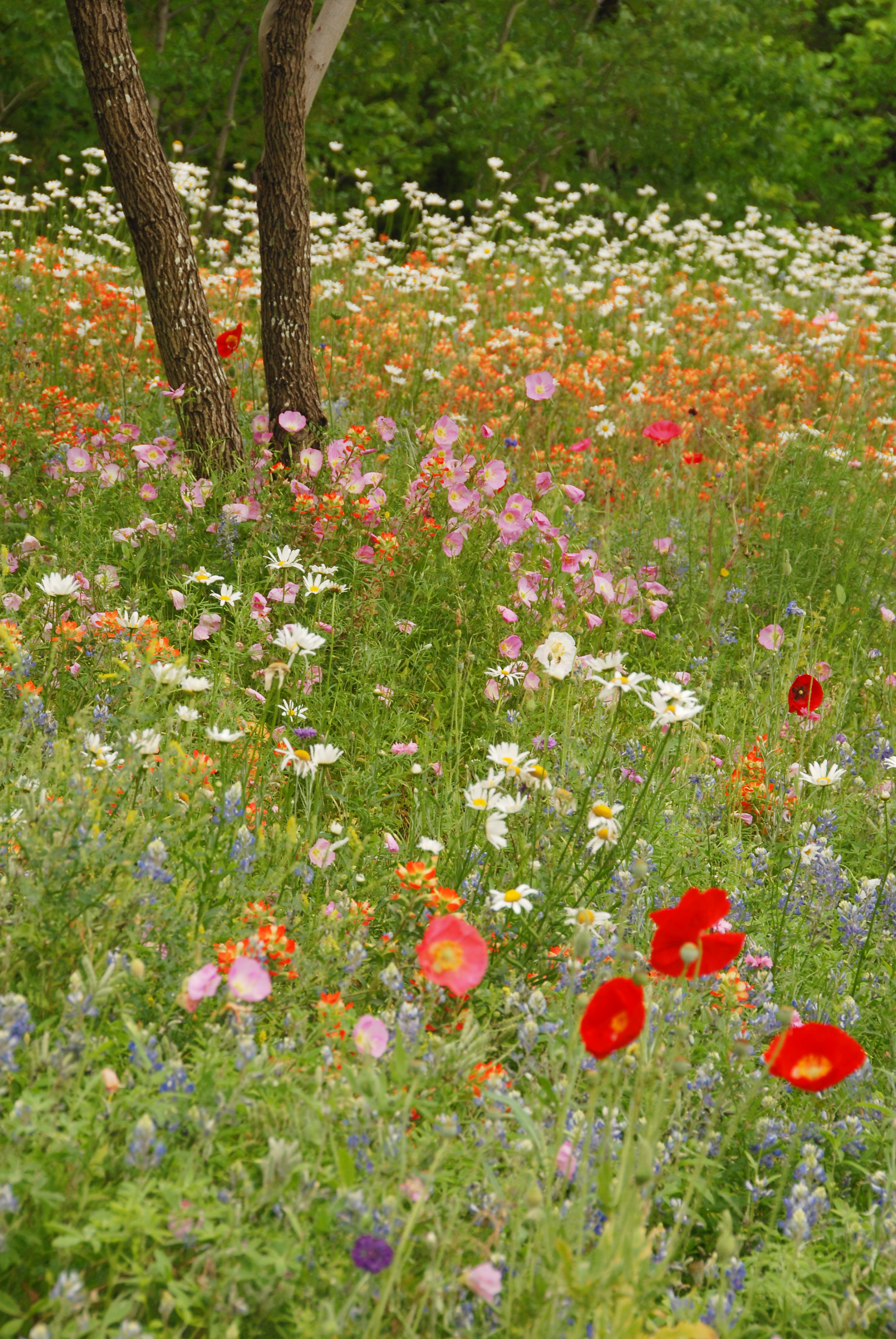
Wildflowers are blooming in April in a field in central Texas near Lake Grapevine.

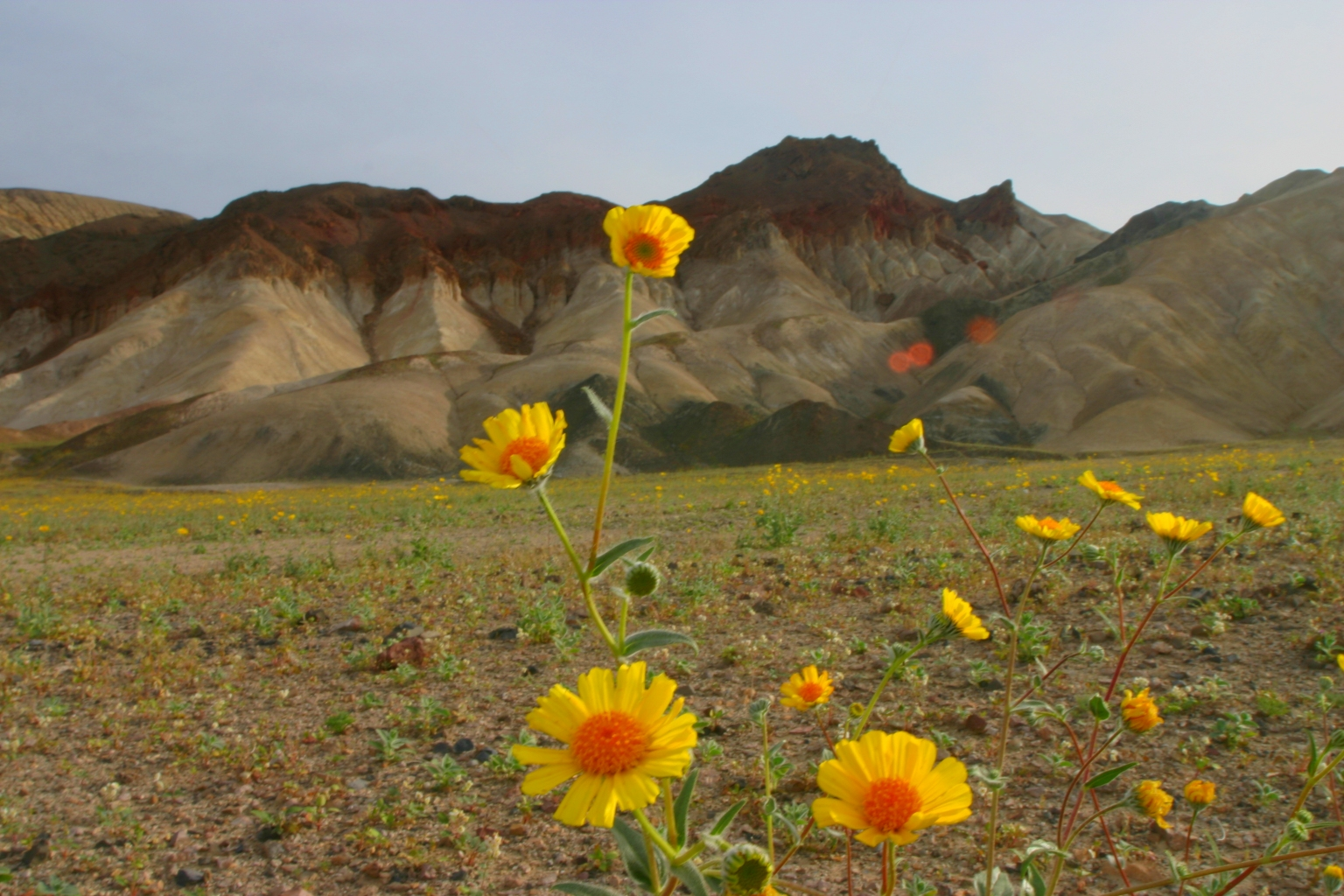
Wildflowers in Death Valley National Park

A wildflower (or wild flower) is a flower that grows in the wild, rather than being intentionally seeded or planted. The term implies that the plant is neither a hybrid nor a selected cultivar that is any different from the native plant, even if it is growing where it would not naturally be found. The term can refer to the whole plant, even when not in bloom, and not just the flower.

"Wildflower" is an imprecise term. More exact terms include:

- native species naturally occurring in the area (see flora)
- exotic or introduced species not native to the area, including
  - invasive species that out-compete other plants, whether native or not
  - imported (introduced to an area whether deliberately or accidentally)
  - naturalized (imported, but come to be considered by the public as native)

In the United Kingdom, the organization Plantlife International instituted the "County Flowers scheme" in 2002; see County flowers of the United Kingdom for which members of the public nominated and voted for a wildflower emblem for their county. The aim was to spread awareness of the heritage of native species and about the need for conservation, as some of these species are endangered. For example, Somerset has adopted the cheddar pink (Dianthus gratianopolitanus), London the rosebay willowherb (Chamerion angustifolium) and Denbighshire/Sir Ddinbych in Wales the rare limestone woundwort (Stachys alpina).

== Examples ==
- Adonis aestivalis, summer pheasant's-eye
- Anagallis, pimpernel
- Agrostemma githago, common corn-cockle
- Anthemis arvensis, corn chamomile
- Callirhoe involucrata, purple poppy-mallow
- Centaurea cyanus, cornflower
- Coreopsis tinctoria, plains coreopsis
- Dianthus barbatus, sweet William
- Digitalis purpurea, foxglove
- Dimorphotheca sinuata, glandular Cape marigold
- Eschscholzia californica, California poppy
- Ficaria verna, lesser celandine
- Glebionis segetum, corn marigold
- Gypsophila elegans, annual baby's-breath
- Lantana spp., shrub verbenas
- Papaver rhoeas, common poppy
- Petasites hybridus, butterbur
- Phlox drummondii, annual phlox
- Potentilla sterilis, strawberryleaf cinquefoil
- Prunus padus, bird cherry
- Silene latifolia, white campion
- Tussilago farfara, coltsfoot
- Viola riviniana, common dog-violet
- Viola tricolor, wild pansy

== See also ==
- List of San Francisco Bay Area wildflowers
- Superbloom
- Megaherb
- Native plant
- Naturalisation
- Weed
- Escaped plant
