= Callipielus fumosa =

Scientific classification
- Kingdom: Animalia
- Phylum: Arthropoda
- Class: Insecta
- Order: Lepidoptera
- Family: Hepialidae
- Genus: Callipielus
- Species: C. fumosa

Binomial name
- Callipielus fumosa Nielsen and Robinson, 1983

Species of moth

Callipielus fumosa is a species of moth of the family Hepialidae. It is known from Chile.
