= Callipielus gentillii =

Scientific classification
- Kingdom: Animalia
- Phylum: Arthropoda
- Class: Insecta
- Order: Lepidoptera
- Family: Hepialidae
- Genus: Callipielus
- Species: C. gentillii

Binomial name
- Callipielus gentillii Nielsen and Robinson, 1983

Species of moth

Callipielus gentillii is a species of moth of the family Hepialidae. It is known from Argentina.
