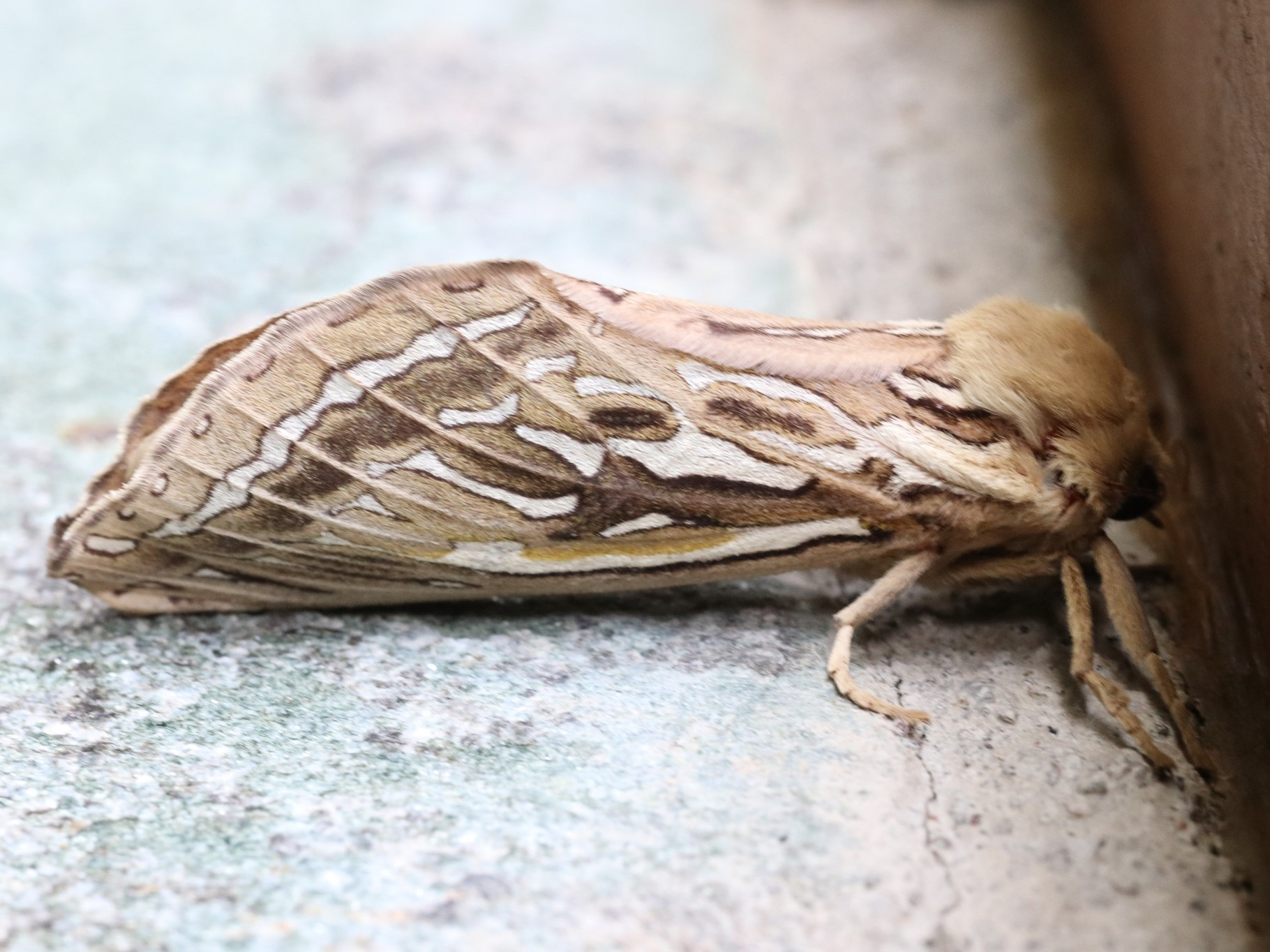

Scientific classification
- Domain: Eukaryota
- Kingdom: Animalia
- Phylum: Arthropoda
- Class: Insecta
- Order: Lepidoptera
- Family: Hepialidae
- Genus: Callipielus
- Species: C. arenosus

Binomial name
- Callipielus arenosus Butler, 1882

Synonyms
- Callipielus chiliensis Viette, 1950; Callipielus leukogramma Bryk, 1945; Callipielus staudingeri Wagner, 1911; Hepialus antarcticus Staudinger, 1899

= Callipielus arenosus =

Species of moth

Callipielus arenosus is a species of moth of the family Hepialidae. It is found in Argentina and Chile.
