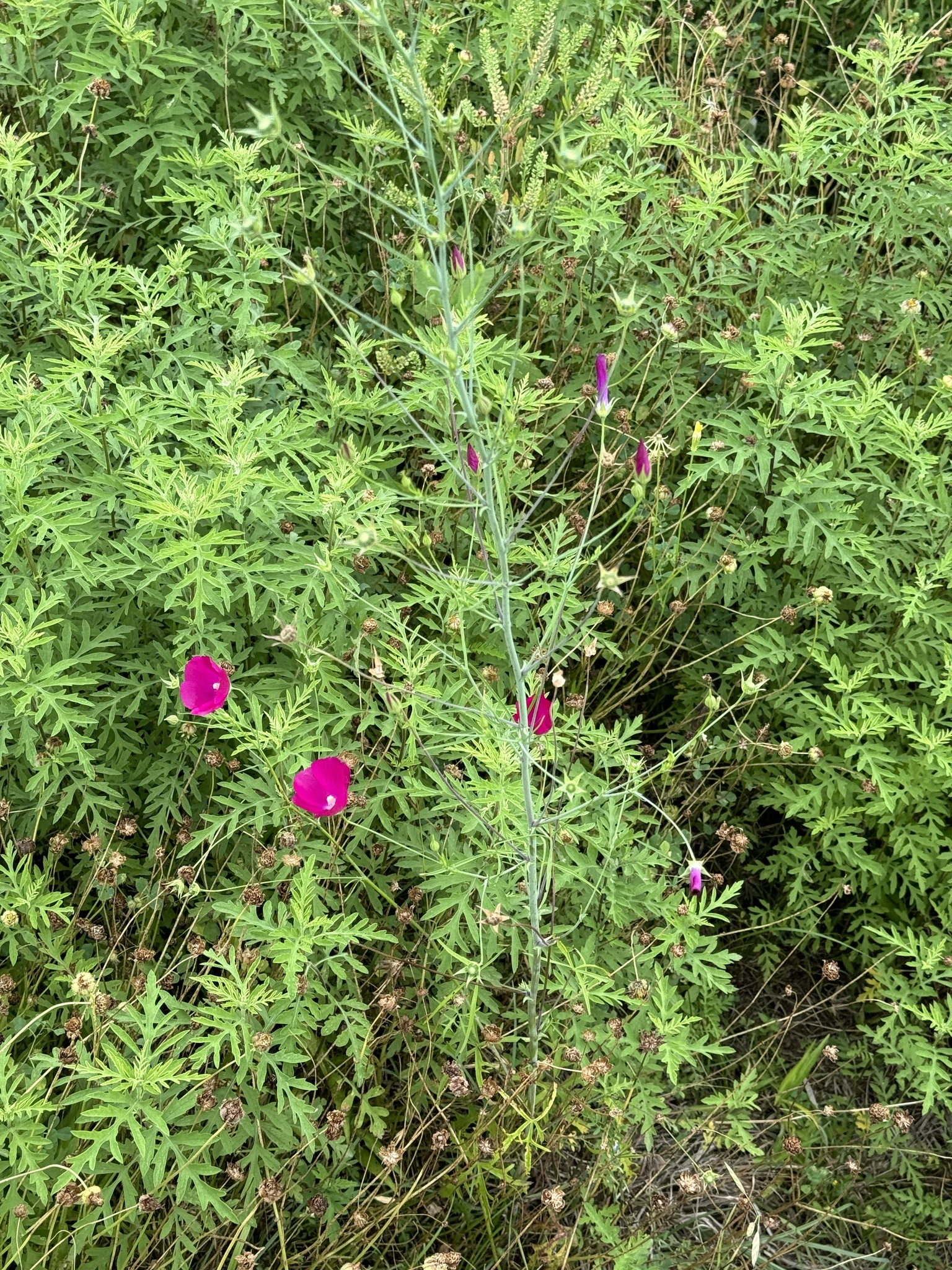
- Callirhoe leiocarpa in Texas

Conservation status
- Secure (NatureServe)

Scientific classification
- Kingdom: Plantae
- Clade: Tracheophytes
- Clade: Angiosperms
- Clade: Eudicots
- Clade: Rosids
- Order: Malvales
- Family: Malvaceae
- Genus: Callirhoe
- Species: C. leiocarpa

Binomial name
- Callirhoe leiocarpa Martin

= Callirhoe leiocarpa =

Species of flowering plant

Callirhoe leiocarpa is a species of flowering plant in the family Malvaceae known by the common names tall poppymallow or annual winecup. It was formally described and named by American botanist Robert F. Martin in 1938. It is an annual wildflower that grows 2–4 feet tall with vivid magenta-pink, cup-shaped flowers observed mostly in Texas but with some sighting in other southern states. It thrives in full sun, well-drained sandy or rocky soil, blooms March-August, and is drought-tolerant.
