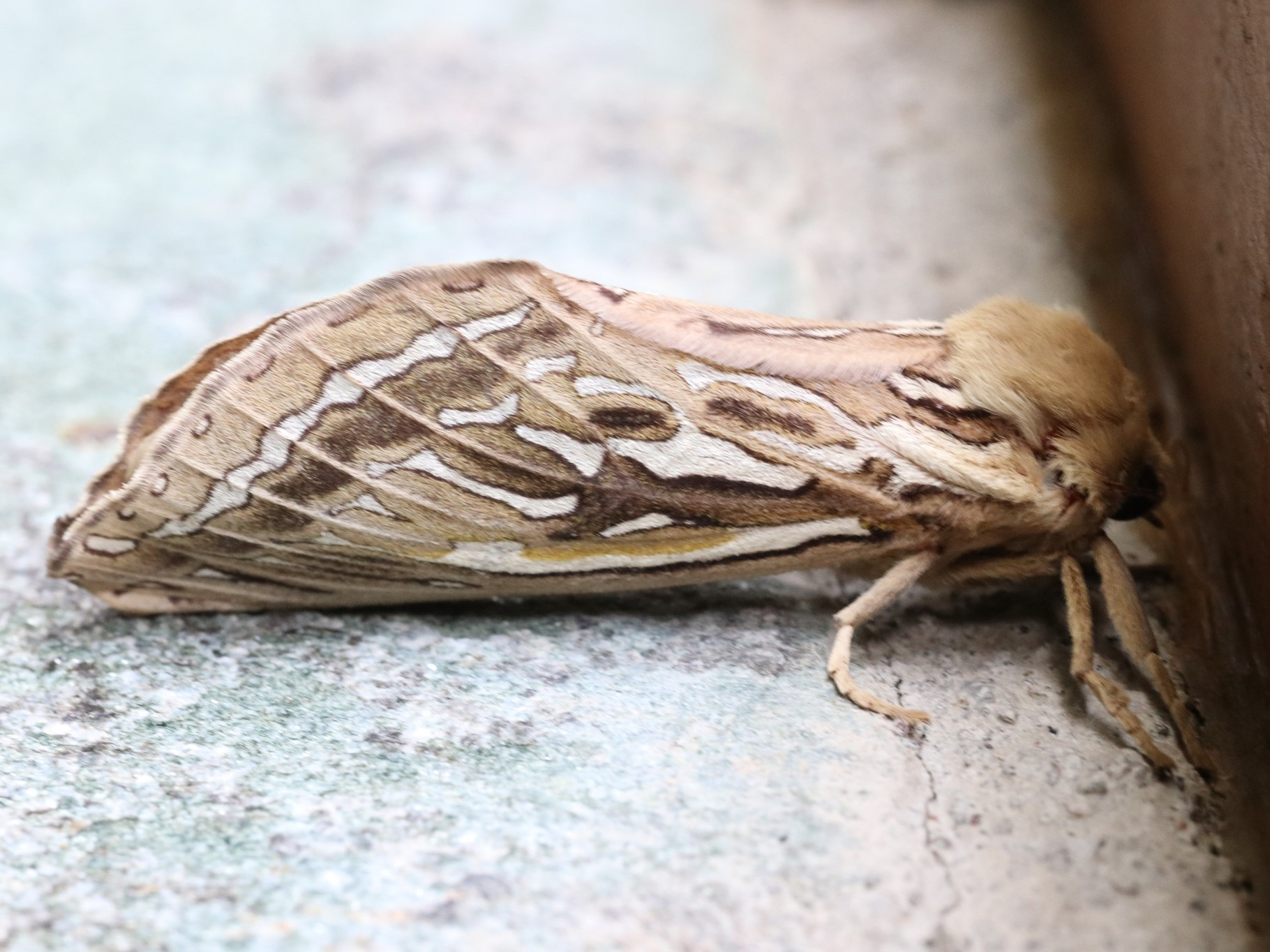
- Callipielus arenosus

Scientific classification
- Domain: Eukaryota
- Kingdom: Animalia
- Phylum: Arthropoda
- Class: Insecta
- Order: Lepidoptera
- Family: Hepialidae
- Genus: Callipielus; Butler, 1882

Species
- See text.

Synonyms
- Stachyocera Ureta, 1957

= Callipielus =

Genus of moths

Callipielus is a genus of moths of the family Hepialidae. There are 10 described species, all found in southern South America.

== Species ==
- Callipielus arenosus - Chile/Argentina
- Callipielus argentata - Chile
- Callipielus digitata - Chile
- Callipielus fumosa - Chile
- Callipielus gentillii - Argentina
- Callipielus izquierdoi - Chile
- Callipielus krahmeri - Chile
- Callipielus perforata - Argentina
- Callipielus salasi - Chile
- Callipielus vulgaris - Argentina
