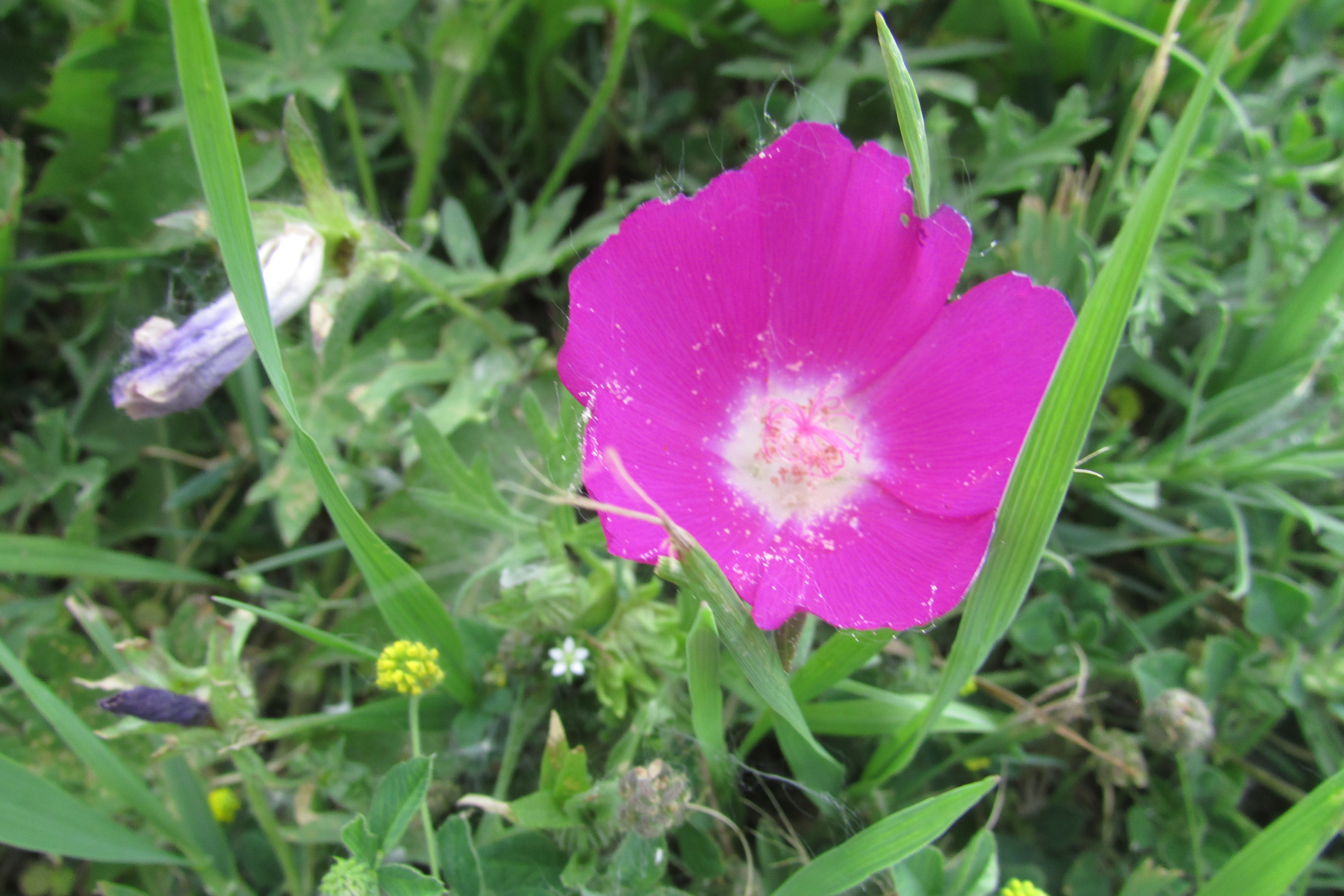
- In Kansas

Conservation status
- Vulnerable (NatureServe)

Scientific classification
- Kingdom: Plantae
- Clade: Tracheophytes
- Clade: Angiosperms
- Clade: Eudicots
- Clade: Rosids
- Order: Malvales
- Family: Malvaceae
- Genus: Callirhoe
- Species: C. bushii

Binomial name
- Callirhoe bushii Fernald

= Callirhoe bushii =

Species of flowering plant

Callirhoe bushii is a species of flowering plant in the mallow family known by the common name Bush's poppy-mallow. It is native to the United States, where it can be found in Arkansas, Kansas, Missouri, and Oklahoma. There are also some introduced populations in Iowa.

This plant was first described in 1909 and named for the botanist Benjamin Franklin Bush. It produces poppy-like magenta flowers. It is commonly grown as an ornamental plant. In the wild it grows in woodlands and on prairies, often on calcareous soils. It is associated with Verbesina helianthoides, Campanula americana, Ampelopsis cordata, Campsis radicans, Cassia sp., Melilotus alba, Rudbeckia triloba, Polymnia canadensis, Smilax sp., and Clematis virginiana

There are 49 known occurrences, the largest containing hundreds of individuals. Most populations, however, have fewer than 50 plants. The species is threatened by habitat loss during development and urbanization. Habitat is also being consumed for grazing and cropland. The plant can tolerate some disturbance, but not the destruction of habitat.
