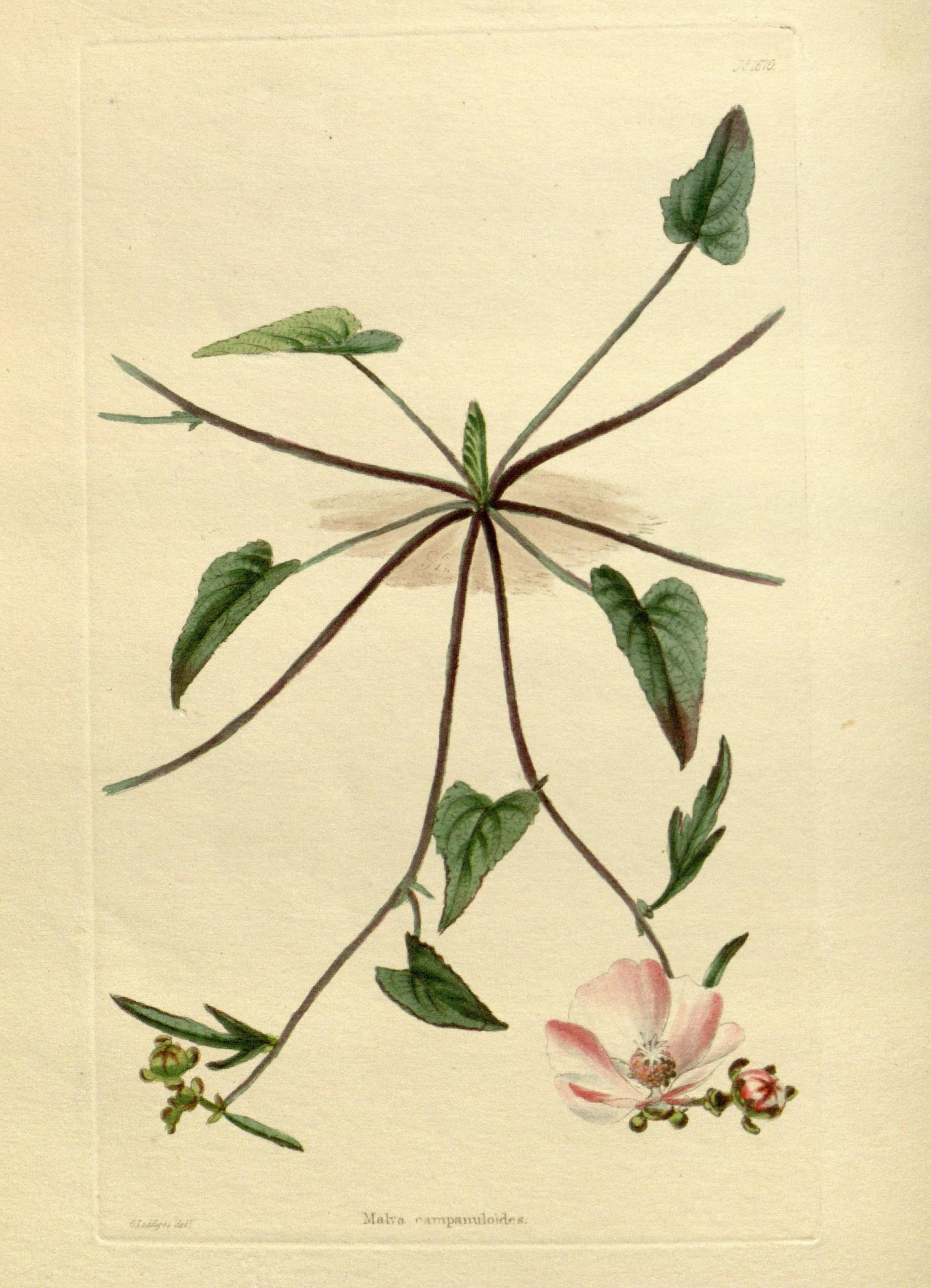
- Botanical illustration

Scientific classification
- Kingdom: Plantae
- Clade: Embryophytes
- Clade: Tracheophytes
- Clade: Angiosperms
- Clade: Eudicots
- Clade: Rosids
- Order: Malvales
- Family: Malvaceae
- Genus: Callirhoe
- Species: C. triangulata

Binomial name
- Callirhoe triangulata (Leavenw.) A.Gray

Synonyms
- Malva campanuloides G.Lodd. ex Bosse; Malva houghtonii Torr. & A.Gray; Malva triangulata Leavenw.; Nuttallia cordifolia Nutt.; Nuttallia triangulata (Leavenw.) Hook.; Sesquicella triangulata (Leavenw.) Alef.

= Callirhoe triangulata =

Species of plant

Callirhoe triangulata, the clustered poppymallow, is a species of flowering plant in the family Malvaceae. Disjunctly distributed, it is found in the upper Midwest, particularly the Illinois, Kankakee, Mississippi, Wabash, and Wisconsin river valleys, and in scattered locales in the Atlantic Plain of the southeastern United States. A perennial reaching 60 cm (2 ft), it prefers sandy soils.
