= Callipielus salasi =

Scientific classification
- Kingdom: Animalia
- Phylum: Arthropoda
- Class: Insecta
- Order: Lepidoptera
- Family: Hepialidae
- Genus: Callipielus
- Species: C. salasi

Binomial name
- Callipielus salasi Robinson, 1977

Species of moth

Callipielus salasi is a species of moth of the family Hepialidae. It was discovered in Temuco, Chile at the Carillanca Experimental Station. It was discovered and named by Gaden Sutherland Robinson in his 1977 publication "A Taxonomic Revision of the Genus Callipielus" and readdressed in his 1983 publication "Ghost Moths of South America".
