= Ernest Jesse Palmer =

U.S. botanist (1875–1962)

Ernest Jesse Palmer (April 8, 1875 – February 25, 1962) was a “collector-botanist” botanical taxonomist and plant collector. He began collecting in 1901, then collected professionally for the Missouri Botanical Garden starting in 1913 and for Harvard University's Arnold Arboretum from 1921, until 1948. He specialized in the genera Crataegus and Quercus.

== Early life ==
Ernest Jesse Palmer was born in Leicester, England on April 8, 1875 to Anna Windle Palmer and Amos Palmer. The family moved to west central Missouri when he was just three years old, then again in 1891 to Webb City, Missouri. Throughout his childhood his parents encouraged his interest in natural history.

== Career ==
Palmer became his family’s main support at the age of eleven after his father lost his ability to work. He worked several jobs including deliveries via his horse and cart, and later bookkeeping for a local oil company, Waters-Pierce Oil Company. Meanwhile he continued his interests in natural history.

In 1900, Palmer read botanist Benjamin Franklin Bush’s 1894 paper in which Bush implored readers to send to him plant specimens for taxonomic identification. Over a period of a few months, botanist Bush identified several plants for Palmer and in the next year visited him several times. Through Bush, Palmer became aware of the botanist Charles Sprague Sargent. Sargent, for whom Bush collected specimens, also became aware of E.J.Palmer.

Palmer first sent specimens to Sargent in November of 1901. The first shipment of hawthorn fruits failed due to mispackaging and mishandling, but when Palmer sent a second package he received praise from Sargent for the successful drying of them. According to Sargent, the Crataegus hawthorn genera are difficult to handle. He further writes that he will send a list of plants for Palmer to look for in the spring. By 1903 Sargent had identified three new herbarium specimens from Palmer’s samples, Crataegus palmeri, C. lanuginosa, and C. speciosa. The first he named after Palmer. Palmer increased his taxonomic knowledge, especially on the Crataegus genus, and exchanged letters with Sargent until 1907.

Sargent wrote to Palmer in 1907 to urge him to work for the Arnold Arboretum collecting professionally. Palmer refused, citing his need to support his family. Sargent asked again in 1908 and 1911, and Palmer refused him these times as well. However, by 1910 Palmer was traveling extensively to collect specific specimens for Sargent. He traveled to Joplin, Duenweg, Alba, Carthage, Galena and Noel, nearby to Webb City, Missouri. He finally accepted Sargent’s offer in 1913, also starting work for the Missouri Botanical Garden.

After his mother’s death in 1920, Palmer moved to Boston in 1921 to work with Sargent. They worked closely together until Sargent’s death in March 1927. A month later Palmer was fired as a cost-cutting measure but was rehired the following year. He officially retired midsummer of 1947 but returned to work later that September until early summer 1948.

== Marriage and family ==
Ernest Jesse Palmer married Elizabeth McDougal in 1930 at the age of 55. Elizabeth was a bacteriologist at Massachusetts State Laboratory. They lived at an Arnold Arboretum house at 1090 Centre street in Boston where they raised three children, Theodore Windle Palmer, Grace Elizabeth Palmer, and Ernest MacDougal Palmer.

== Publications ==
E.J. Palmer wrote more than 100 botanical papers, he had published his first paper in 1910. After his death his wife published a book of his poems: Gathered Leaves, Green Gold and Sere.

The standard author abbreviation E.J.Palmer is used to indicate this person as the author when citing a botanical name.
