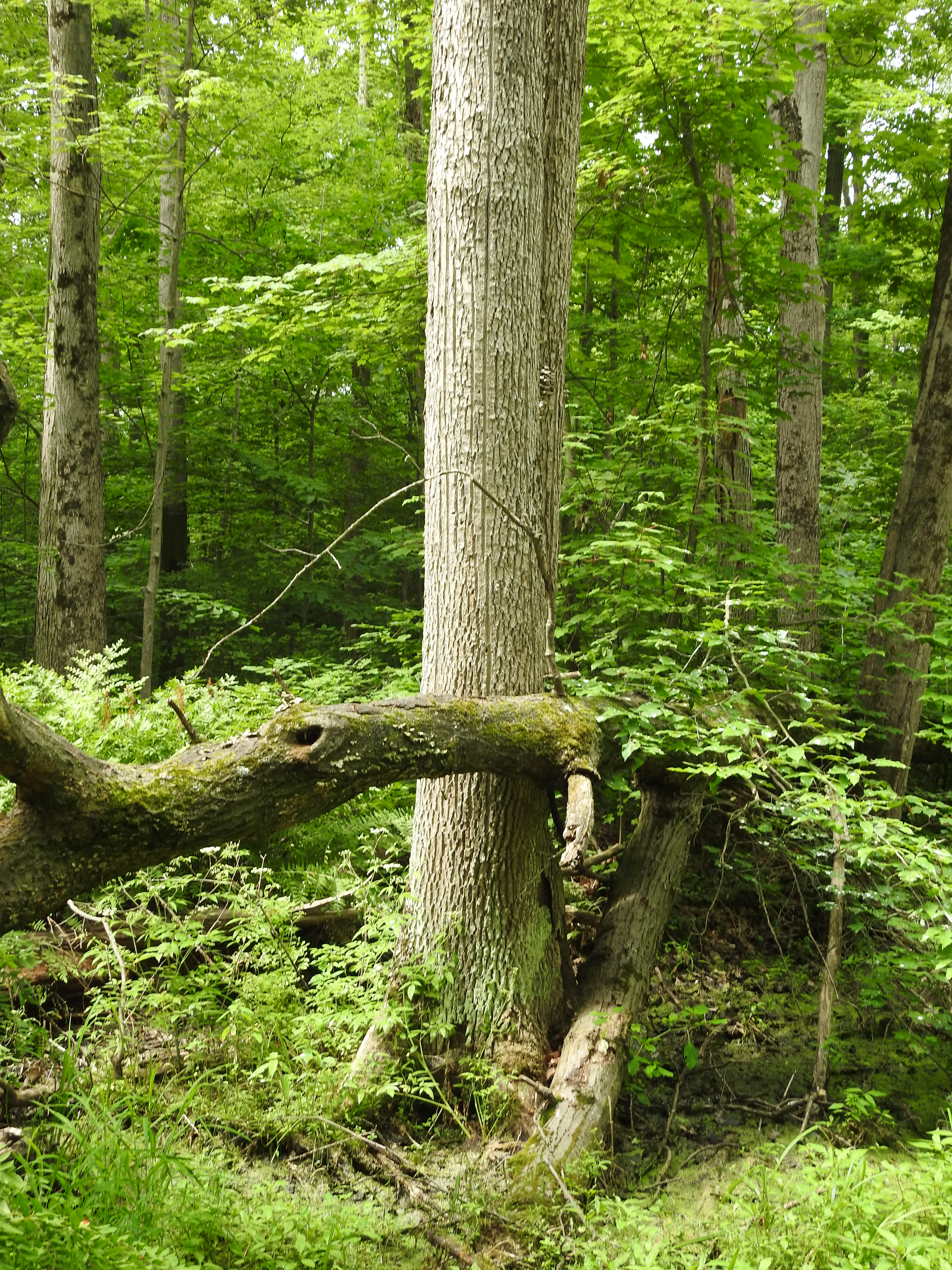
- Pumpkin ash in a hardwood swamp in Ontario, Canada.

Conservation status
- Critically Endangered (IUCN 3.1)

Scientific classification
- Kingdom: Plantae
- Clade: Tracheophytes
- Clade: Angiosperms
- Clade: Eudicots
- Clade: Asterids
- Order: Lamiales
- Family: Oleaceae
- Genus: Fraxinus
- Section: Fraxinus sect. Melioides
- Species: F. profunda

Binomial name
- Fraxinus profunda (Bush) Bush
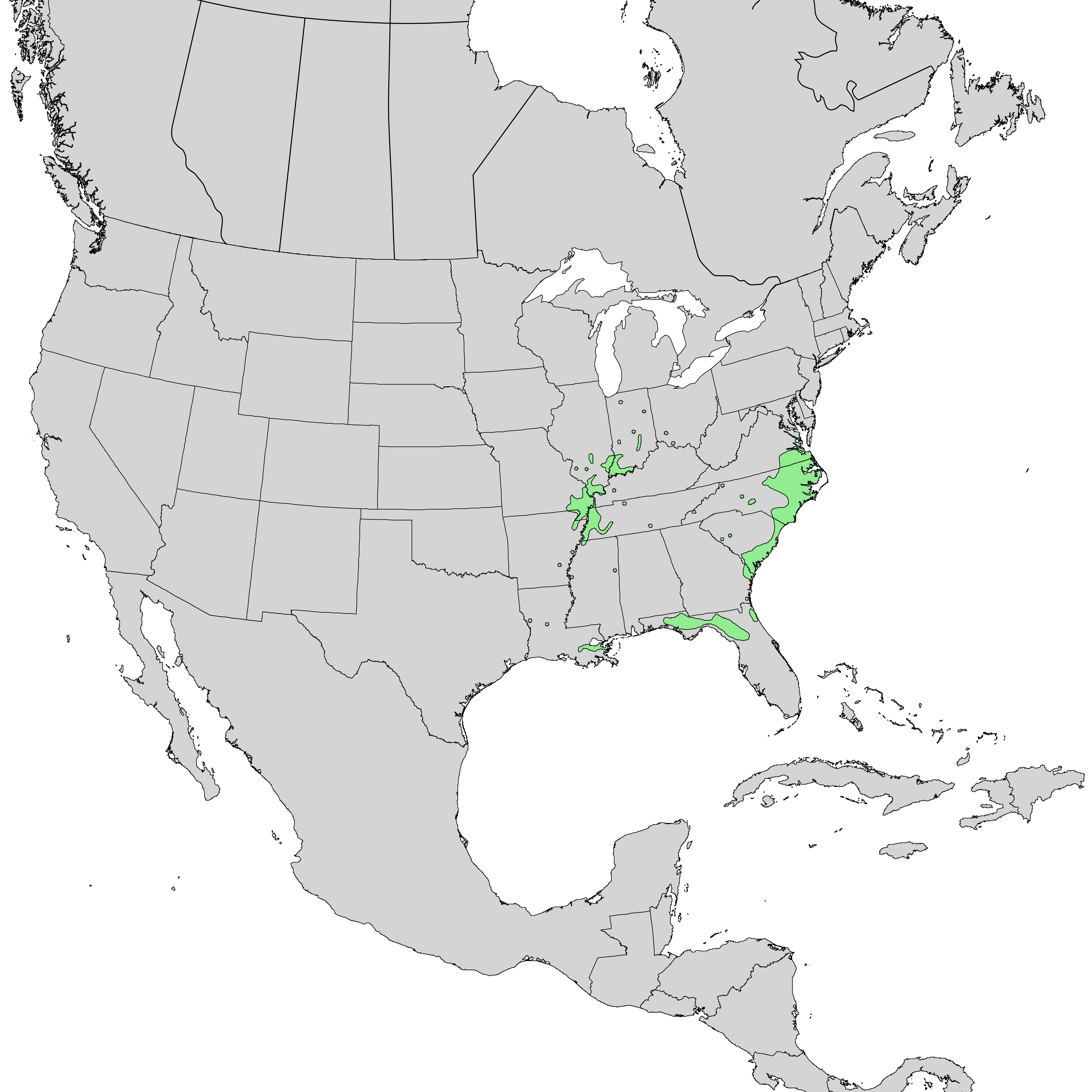
- Natural range of Fraxinus profunda
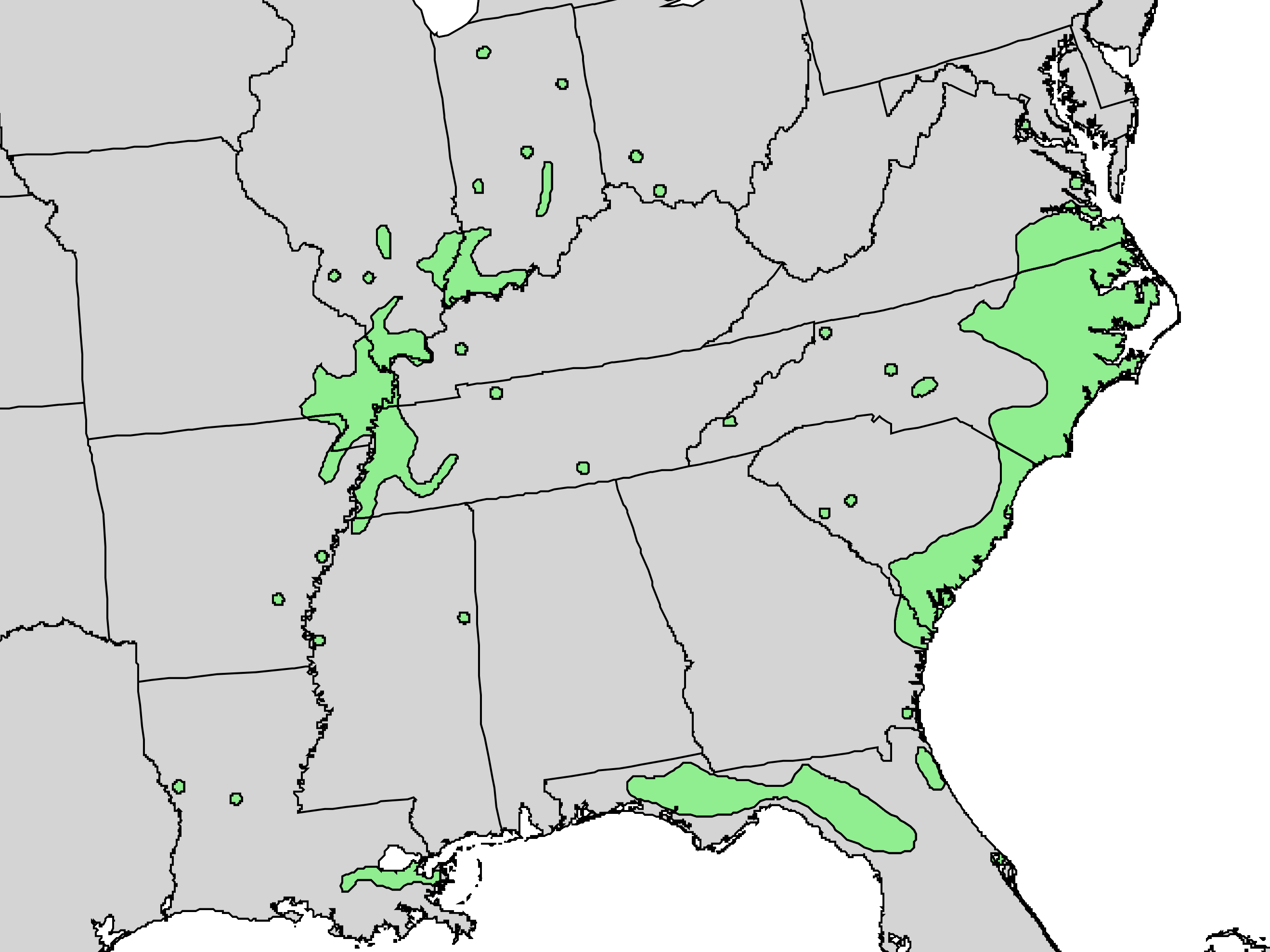
- Close-up of natural range of Fraxinus profunda

Synonyms
- Fraxinus tomentosa F.Michx.

= Fraxinus profunda =

Species of ash

Fraxinus profunda, the pumpkin ash, is a species of ash (Fraxinus) native to eastern North America, where it has a scattered distribution on the Atlantic coastal plain and interior lowland river valleys from the Lake Erie basin in Ontario and New York west to Illinois, southwest to Missouri and southeast to northern Florida. It grows in bottomland habitats, such as swamps, floodplains and riverbanks. It is threatened by the emerald ash borer (Agrilus planipennis), an invasive insect which has caused widespread destruction of ash trees in eastern North America.

== Taxonomy ==
Pumpkin ash is a member of the olive family (Oleaceae) and is placed in section Melioides of the genus Fraxinus. Historically, it was frequently called Fraxinus tomentosa Michx., but since Michaux used this name interchangeably with the species now known as green ash (F. pennsylvanica), the name Fraxinus profunda, which was applied by Benjamin Franklin Bush in 1901, was given precedence.

Pumpkin ash is hexaploid (n=138) and has been hypothesized to have originated as a fertile hybrid between green ash and white ash (F. americana), but this remains unproven.

The name pumpkin ash originates from early European settlers in Arkansas and refers to the swollen trunk bases which this tree often produces in very wet habitats.

== Morphology ==
Pumpkin ash is a medium-sized deciduous tree reaching 12 to 30 meters (39 to 98 ft) tall with a trunk up to 1 meter in diameter, although exceptional trees can reach 50 meters (160 feet) tall with a 4.7 meters (15 feet) diameter trunk. Important morphological characteristics of pumpkin ash include:

- bark: gray, thick and fissured with a diamond pattern on mature trees
- buds: dark brown to blackish, with a velvety texture
- leaves: 25 to 40 centimeters (9.8 to 15.7 inches) long, oppositely-arranged, pinnately compound with 7 to 9 leaflets; leaflets 8 to 20 centimeters (3.1 to 7.9 inches) long and 5 to 8 centimeters (2.0 to 3.1 inches) broad, with smooth or obscurely serrated margins and short petiolules; abaxial (lower) surfaces are tomentose and lack a dense covering of papillae (visible at >40x magnification)
- flowers: wind-pollinated, purplish-green, lacking a corolla; borne in panicles; blooming in spring shortly before the emergence of leaves
- fruit: samaras 5 to 8 centimeters (2.0 to 3.1 inches) long, comprising a single seed with an elongated apical wing 9 millimetres (0.35 inches) broad.

Like other species in the section Melioides, pumpkin ash is dioecious, with male and female flowers produced on separate individuals.

Pumpkin ash trees frequently produce bulbous swollen trunk bases and this is sometimes cited as a diagnostic feature of this species. However, not all pumpkin ash trees exhibit this feature and other ash species, such as green ash, can also produce swollen trunks in very wet habitats.

== Reproduction ==
Pumpkin ash attains sexual maturity and begins producing fruit at approximately ten years of age. The seeds develop during the summer and are dropped in the early fall. The winged samaras are adapted to wind dispersal, but pumpkin ash seeds are uniquely adapted to dispersal by water and can survive submersion for several months.

Seedlings thrive in moist soils in canopy openings and are sensitive to shade. Young trees are extremely fast growing and can quickly attain a height where they compete with mature trees.

== Ecology ==
Pumpkin ash occurs primarily in swamps, floodplains and other wet bottomland habitats. Along with other ashes, it is a food plant for the larvae of several species of Lepidoptera (see List of Lepidoptera that feed on ashes).

Pumpkin ash is threatened by the emerald ash borer, an invasive insect which has destroyed large numbers of ash trees in eastern North America. In 2017, the IUCN assessed the pumpkin ash as Critically Endangered, due to observed massive population declines over most of its range. In 2021, pumpkin ash was listed as endangered in Canada under the Species at Risk Act, 2002.

== Distribution ==
Pumpkin ash has a discontinuous range in eastern North America, where it occurs mainly in swamps and river bottoms of the Atlantic coastal plain, Mississippi valley and lower Great Lakes basin, but is conspicuously absent from regions in between, such as the Appalachian Mountains. As a result of widespread damage by the emerald ash borer, pumpkin ash is near extirpation in North Carolina, South Carolina and Florida, and is critically endangered in Canada.

=== Climate ===
Areas where pumpkin ash trees are found typically have an average rainfall of 101 to 122 centimeters (40 to 48 inches) of rain per year. During the growing season, from March to September, the average rainfall is around 66 centimetres (26 inches). Pumpkin ash can tolerate temperatures as low as -31 degrees Celsius (-24 degrees Fahrenheit).

=== Soils ===
Pumpkin ash grows in saturated wetland soils, including sites which are flooded year-round. Saplings tend to grow slower in very wet conditions compared to higher-elevation microsites.

== Uses ==
Pumpkin ash trees provide resources for humans and animals such as deer and birds. Birds, like wood ducks, feed on the fruit of a Fraxinus profunda. Deer feed on the twigs and leaves of the pumpkin ash tree, and the humans use the woody parts of the tree as lumber for building. In addition to being used as lumber, the wood of pumpkin ash trees can also be used in tools such as stocks or handles. The wood can also be used as lumber, naval store products, and nursery stock products.

== Gallery ==
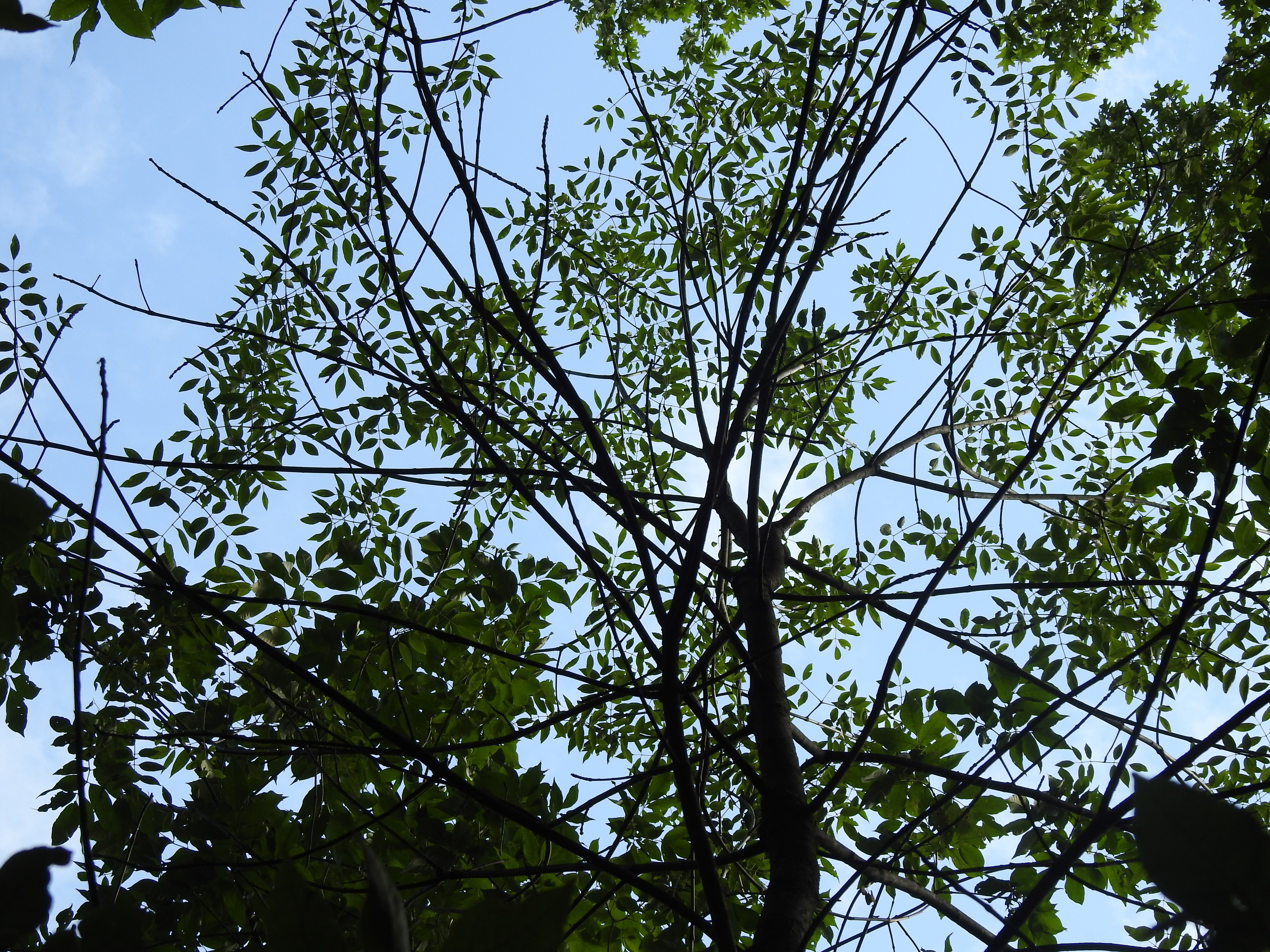
Canopy of a pumpkin ash affected by emerald ash borer in Essex County, Ontario, Canada.

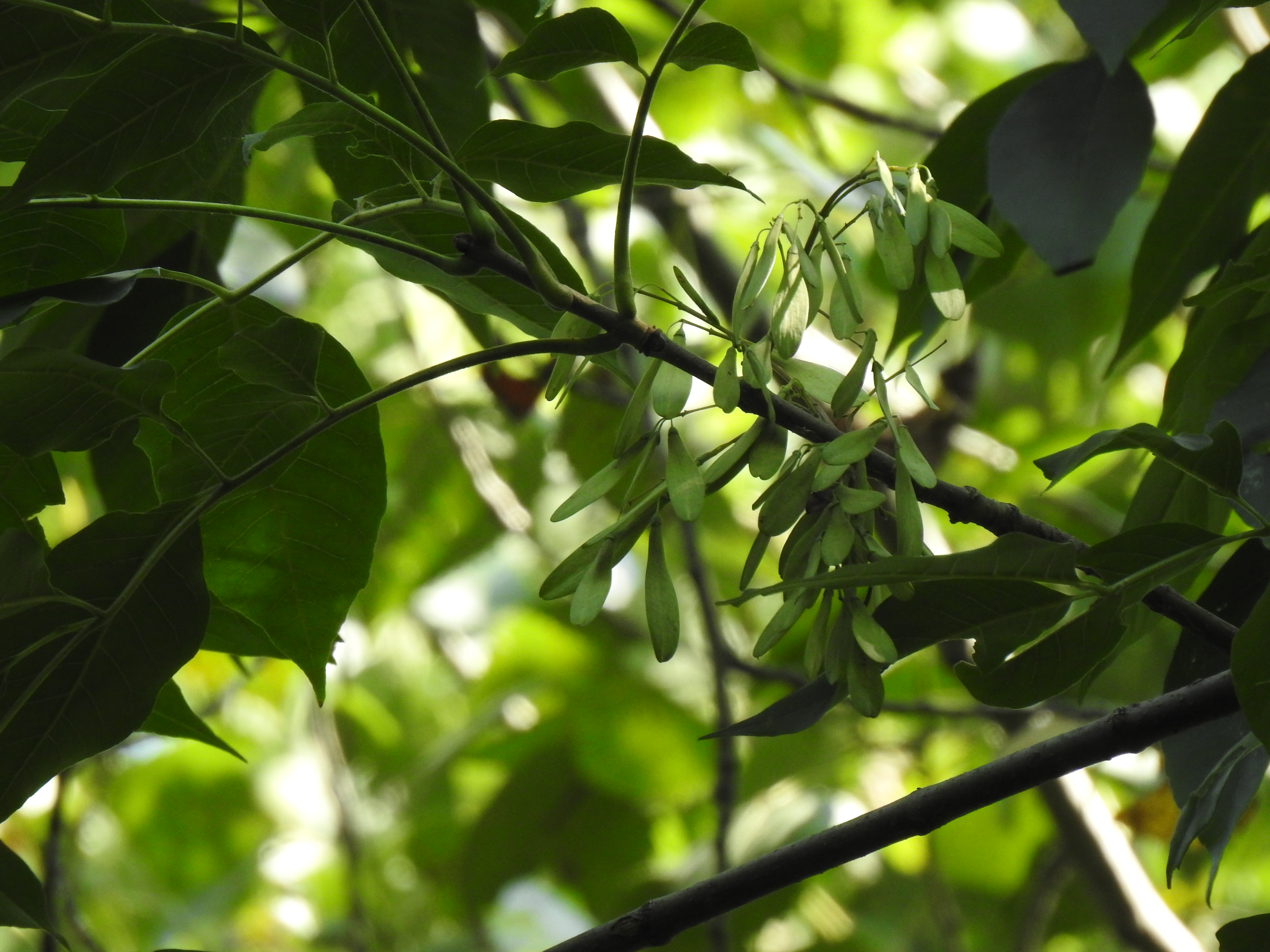
Developing samaras of a pumpkin ash in Elgin County, Ontario, Canada.

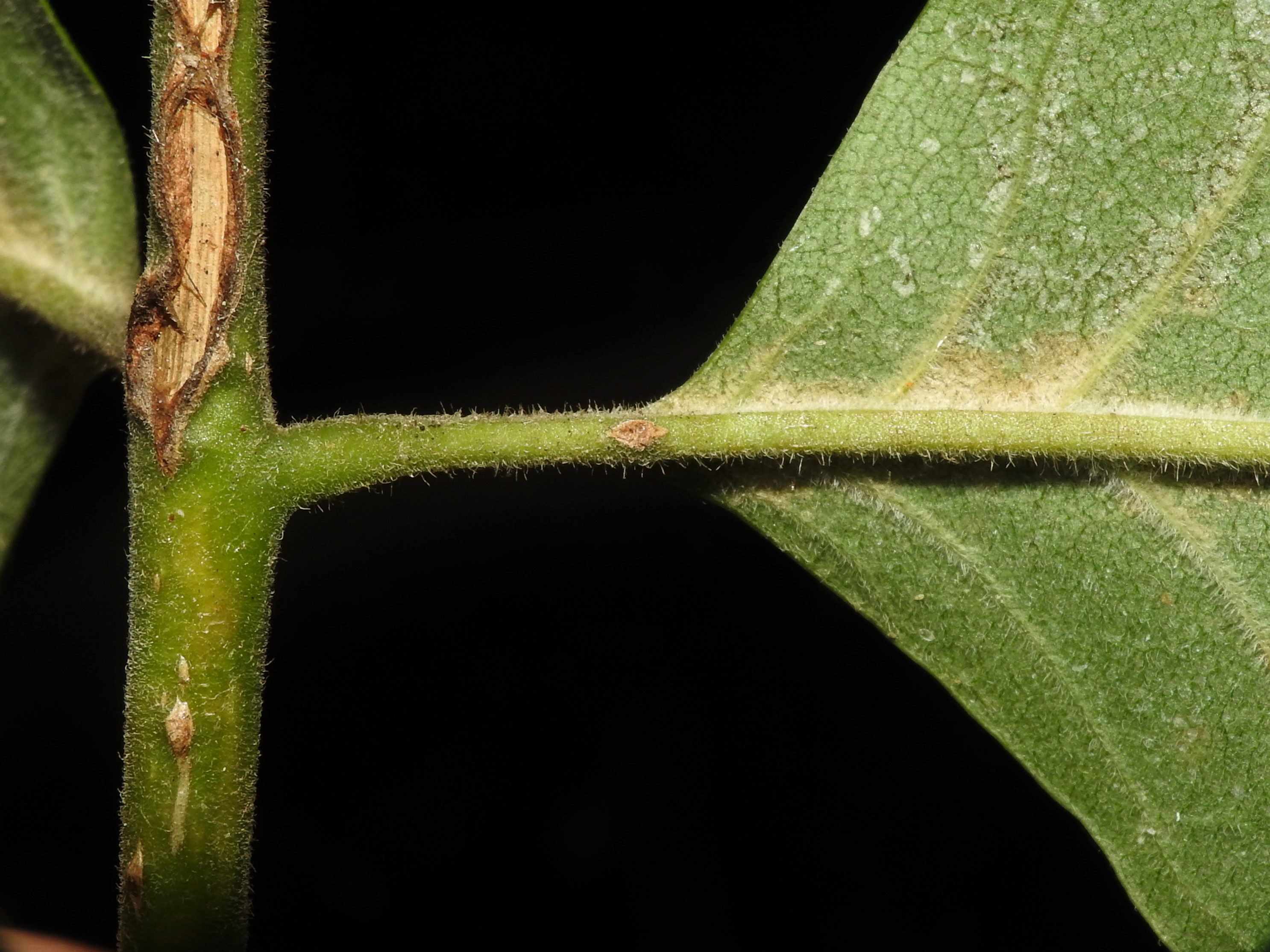
Rachis, petiolule and abaxial leaflet surface of a pumpkin ash leaf from Lambton County, Ontario, Canada.

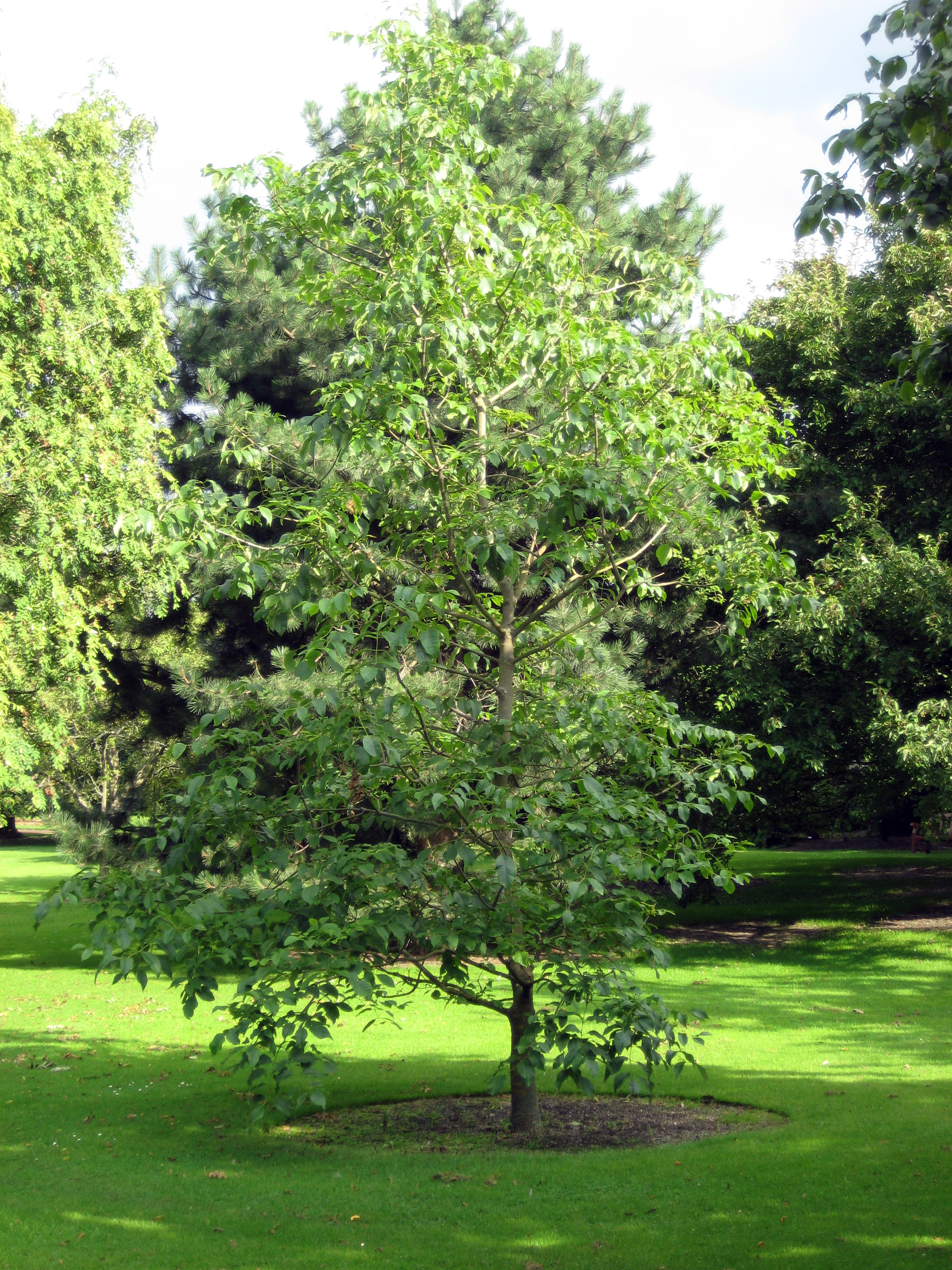
Pumpkin ash in cultivation at Royal Botanic Garden Edinburgh.
