= Callirhoe scabriuscula =

Conservation status
- Imperiled (NatureServe)

Scientific classification
- Kingdom: Plantae
- Clade: Tracheophytes
- Clade: Angiosperms
- Clade: Eudicots
- Clade: Rosids
- Order: Malvales
- Family: Malvaceae
- Genus: Callirhoe
- Species: C. scabriuscula

Binomial name
- Callirhoe scabriuscula B.L.Rob.

Species of flowering plant

Callirhoe scabriuscula is a rare species of flowering plant in the mallow family known as Texas poppy mallow. It is endemic to Texas, where it is known from about ten populations in the deep sands alongside the Colorado River. Much of its habitat has been lost, which is the reason it was federally listed as an endangered species in 1981.

== Description ==
This is a perennial herb with an erect stem that may exceed one meter in height. It produces showy cup-shaped flowers in shades of magenta to wine red with a darker red spot at the base of each petal. Flowering occurs for a short period of time during May or June. The flower opens just before dawn and closes at sunset every day for 6 to 8 days. As soon as the flower is pollinated, it closes within 90 minutes and begins to wither. The flower is a favorite stop for local bees, the main pollinators.

== Distribution and habitat ==
This plant is present in three Texas counties along the Colorado River in an ecoregion known as the Rolling Plains. It only grows in deep spits of windblown, alluvial sand.
