= Callipielus izquierdoi =

Scientific classification
- Kingdom: Animalia
- Phylum: Arthropoda
- Class: Insecta
- Order: Lepidoptera
- Family: Hepialidae
- Genus: Callipielus
- Species: C. izquierdoi

Binomial name
- Callipielus izquierdoi (Ureta, 1957)

Synonyms
- Stachyocera izquierdoi Ureta, 1957

Species of moth

Callipielus izquierdoi is a species of moth of the family Hepialidae. It is known from Chile.
