= Taproot =

Dominant root from which other roots sprout laterally / horizontal

The two types of root systems in plants. The fibrous-root system (A) is characterized by many roots with similar sizes. In contrast, plants that use the taproot system (B) grow a main root, with smaller roots branching off. The letters indicate where the root systems begin.

A taproot is a large, central, and dominant root from which other roots sprout laterally and horizontally. Typically, a taproot is somewhat straight and very thick, is tapering in shape, and grows straight down. In some plants, such as the carrot, the taproot is a storage organ so well developed that it has been cultivated as a vegetable.

The taproot system contrasts with the adventitious- or fibrous-root system of plants with many branched roots, but many plants that grow a taproot during germination go on to develop branching root structures, although some that rely on the main root for storage may retain the dominant taproot for centuries—for example, Welwitschia.

== Description ==
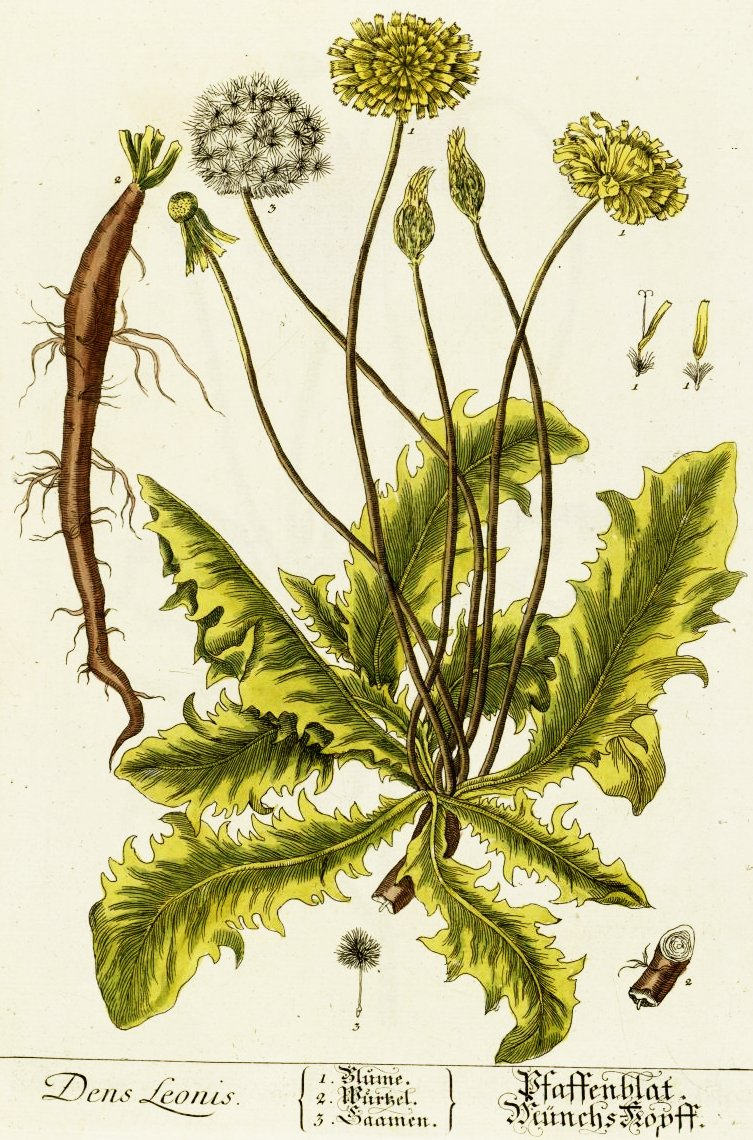
A dandelion taproot (left) with the rest of the plant (right)

Dicots, one of the two divisions of flowering plants (angiosperms), start with a taproot, which is one main root forming from the enlarging radicle of the seed. The tap root can be persistent throughout the life of the plant but is most often replaced later in the plant's development by a fibrous root system. A persistent taproot system forms when the radicle keeps growing and smaller lateral roots form along the taproot. The shape of taproots can vary but the typical shapes include:

- Conical root: this type of root tuber is conical in shape, i.e. widest at the top and tapering steadily towards the bottom: e.g. carrot.
- Fusiform root: this root is widest in the middle and tapers towards the top and the bottom: e.g. radish.
- Napiform root: the root has a top-like appearance. It is very broad at the top and tapers suddenly like a tail at the bottom: e.g. turnip.

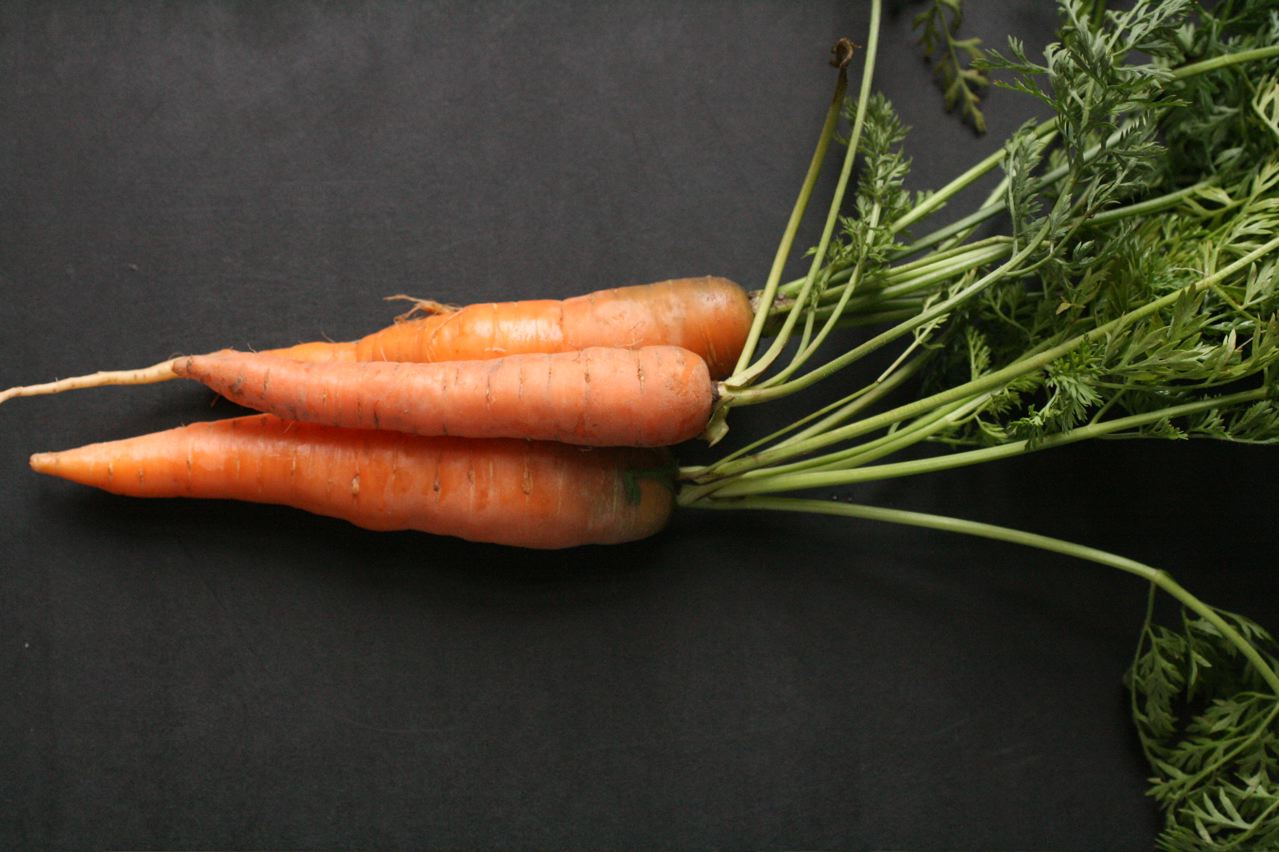
The edible, orange part of the carrot is its taproot

Many taproots are modified into storage organs. Some plants with taproots:

- Beetroot
- Burdock
- Carrot
- Sugar beet
- Dandelion
- Parsley
- Parsnip
- Poppy mallow
- Radish
- Sagebrush
- Turnip
- Common milkweed
- trees such as oaks, elms, pines and firs

== Development ==
Taproots develop from the radicle of a seed, forming the primary root. It branches off to secondary roots, which in turn branch to form tertiary roots. These may further branch to form rootlets. For most plants species the radicle dies some time after seed germination, causing the development of a fibrous root system, which lacks a main downward-growing root. Most trees begin life with a taproot, but after one to a few years the main root system changes to a wide-spreading fibrous root system with mainly horizontal-growing surface roots and only a few vertical, deep-anchoring roots. A typical mature tree 30–50 m tall has a root system that extends horizontally in all directions as far as the tree is tall or more, but as much as 100% of the roots are in the top 50 cm of soil.

Soil characteristics strongly influence the architecture of taproots; for example, deep and rich soils favour the development of vertical taproots in many oak species such as Quercus kelloggii, while clay soils promote the growth of multiple taproots.

== Horticultural considerations ==
Many plants with taproots are difficult to transplant, or even to grow in containers, because the root tends to grow deep rapidly and in many species comparatively slight obstacles or damage to the taproot will stunt or kill the plant. Among weeds with taproots dandelions are typical; being deep-rooted, they are hard to uproot and if the taproot breaks off near the top, the part that stays in the ground often resprouts such that, for effective control, the taproot needs to be severed at least several centimetres below ground level.

== Gallery ==
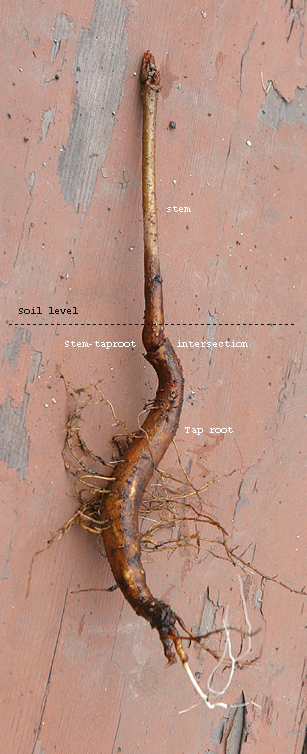
A tree taproot

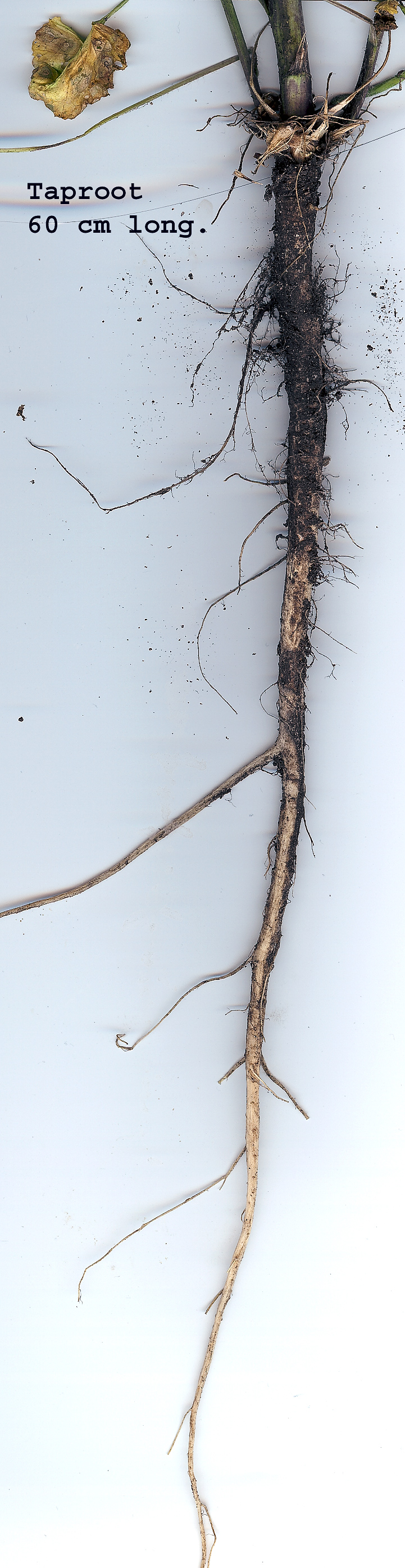
A taproot
