= Crataegus × vailiae =

Scientific classification
- Kingdom: Plantae
- Clade: Tracheophytes
- Clade: Angiosperms
- Clade: Eudicots
- Clade: Rosids
- Order: Rosales
- Family: Rosaceae
- Genus: Crataegus
- Species: C. × vailiae

Binomial name
- Crataegus × vailiae Britton

Synonyms
- C. × conjungens Sarg. C. missouriensis Ashe

Species of hawthorn

Crataegus × vailiae is a hawthorn hybrid that primarily occurs in Virginia, Tennessee, North Carolina and Georgia. It appears to be a hybrid between C. uniflora and a member of series Macracanthae, probably C. calpodendron.
