= Callipielus argentata =

Scientific classification
- Kingdom: Animalia
- Phylum: Arthropoda
- Class: Insecta
- Order: Lepidoptera
- Family: Hepialidae
- Genus: Callipielus
- Species: C. argentata

Binomial name
- Callipielus argentata Ureta, 1957

Species of moth

Callipielus argentata is a species of moth of the family Hepialidae. It is known from Chile and Argentina.
