= Courtney, Missouri =

Unincorporated community in Missouri, U.S.

Coordinates: 39°09′20″N 94°23′37″W

Courtney is an unincorporated community in Jackson County, in the U.S. state of Missouri.

== History ==
A post office called Courtney was established in 1888, and remained in operation until 1962. The community has the name of C. C. Courtney, an early settler.
