= Callipielus digitata =

Scientific classification
- Kingdom: Animalia
- Phylum: Arthropoda
- Class: Insecta
- Order: Lepidoptera
- Family: Hepialidae
- Genus: Callipielus
- Species: C. digitata

Binomial name
- Callipielus digitata Robinson, 1977

Synonyms
- Callipielus brunnescens Robinson, 1977; Callipielus castilloi Robinson, 1977

Species of moth

Callipielus digitata is a species of moth of the family Hepialidae. It is known from Chile.
