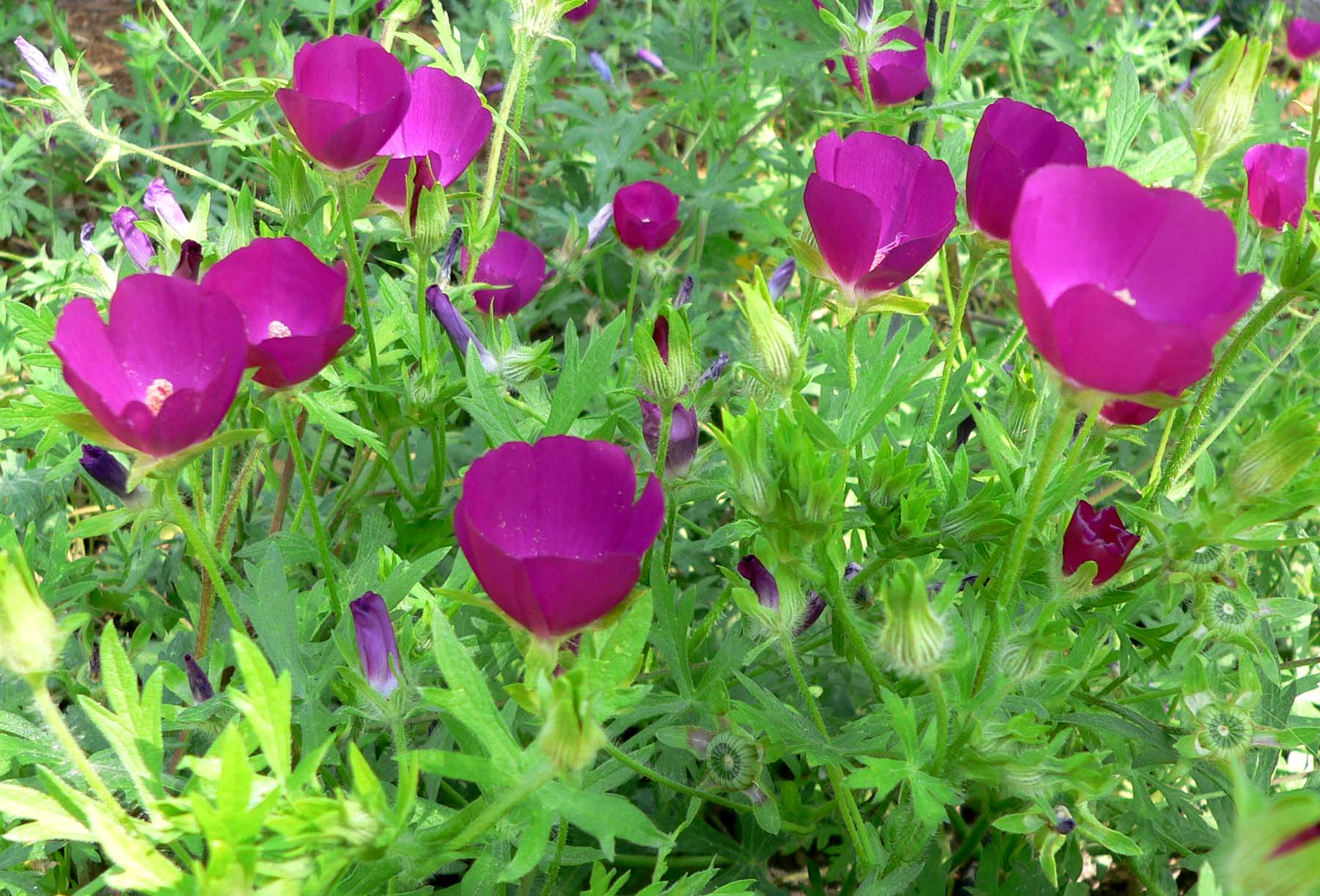

Conservation status
- Secure (NatureServe)

Scientific classification
- Kingdom: Plantae
- Clade: Tracheophytes
- Clade: Angiosperms
- Clade: Eudicots
- Clade: Rosids
- Order: Malvales
- Family: Malvaceae
- Genus: Callirhoe
- Species: C. involucrata

Binomial name
- Callirhoe involucrata (Torr. & A.Gray) A.Gray

Varieties
- C. involucrata var. involucrata; C. involucrata var. lineariloba; C. involucrata var. tenuissima

Synonyms
- Callirhoe geranioides Small; Callirhoe lineariloba (Torr. & A.Gray) A.Gray; Callirhoe macrostegia Hochr.; Callirhoe palmata Buckley; Callirhoe sidalceoides Standl.; Callirhoe verticillata Groenl.; Malva involucrata Torr. & A. Gray; Malva lineariloba (Torr. & A. Gray) M.J. Young

= Callirhoe involucrata =

Plant species in the mallow family

Callirhoe involucrata is a species of flowering plant in the mallow family known by the common names purple poppy-mallow, winecup and buffalo rose. It is native to the Great Plains of the United States and adjacent areas in northern Mexico.

The leaves and stems die back in winter, showing at most a small rosette of green leaves immediately above the root crown.

== Cultivation ==
The purple poppy-mallow is a plant that can create a blanket of color in a garden. Each plant can cover a great deal of ground with masses of its leaves and flowers. In suitably sandy or well draining soils each plant will produce a large parsnip like root. This plant can be classified as ground cover.

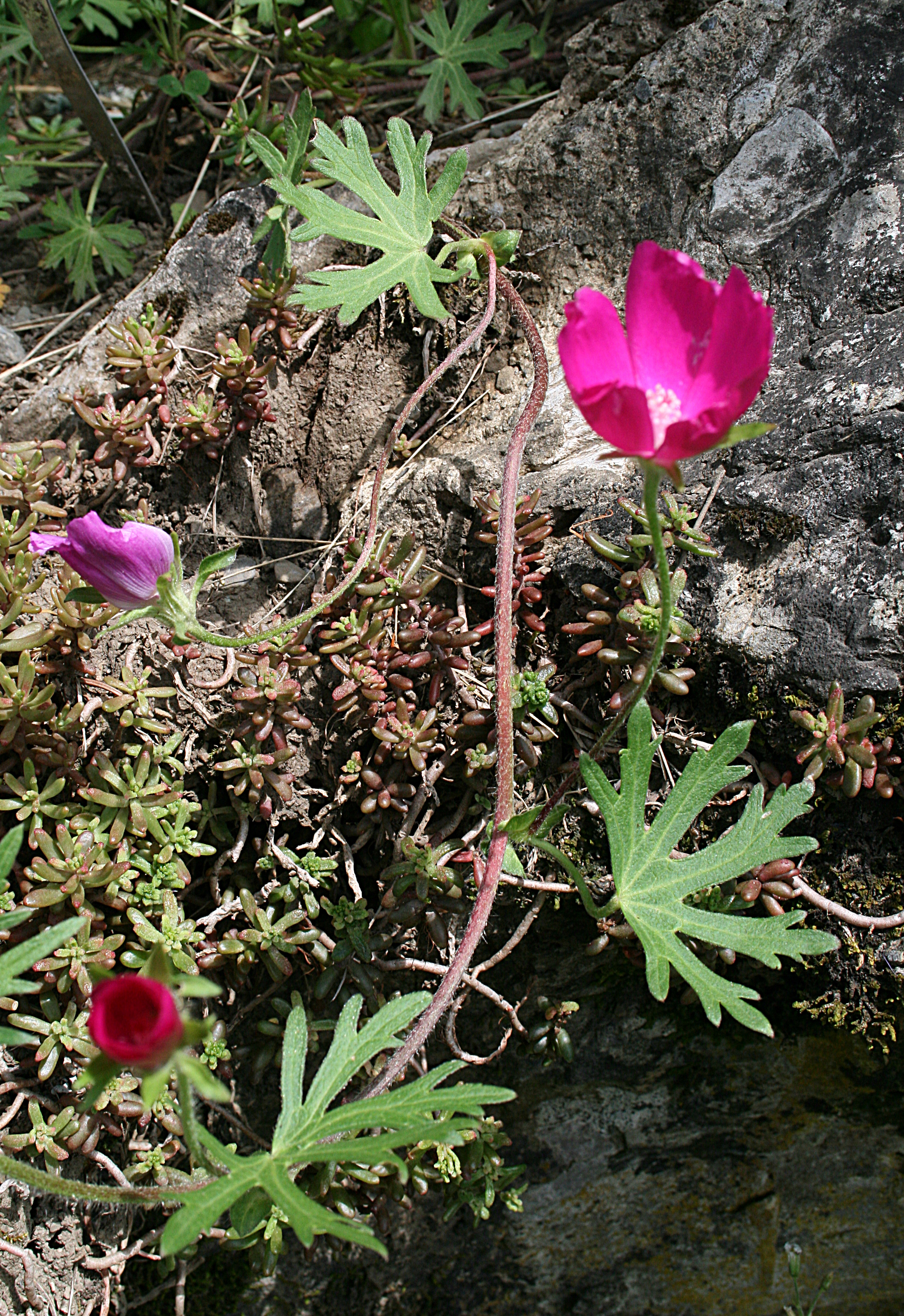
Callirhoe involucrata
