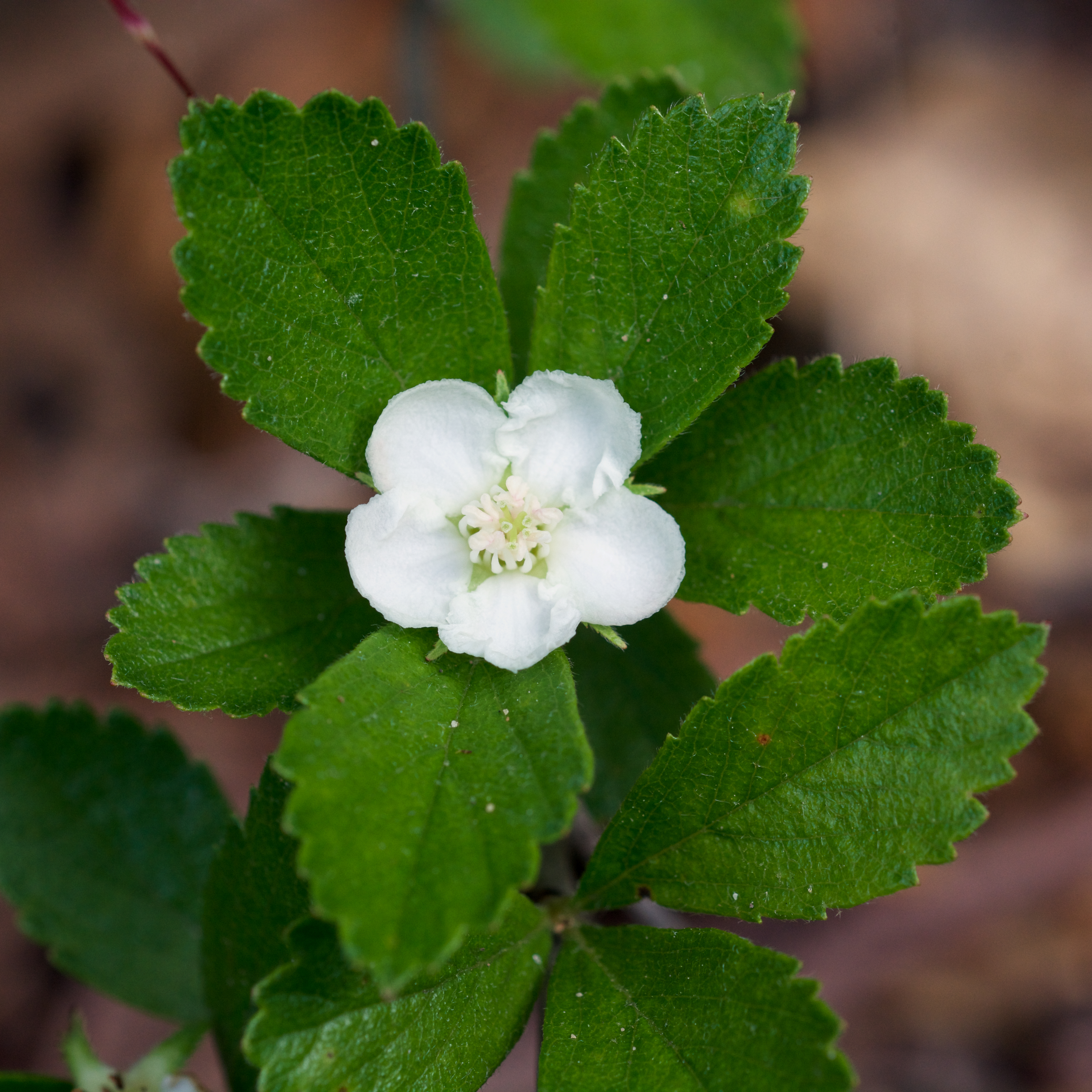

Conservation status
- Least Concern (IUCN 3.1)

Scientific classification
- Kingdom: Plantae
- Clade: Tracheophytes
- Clade: Angiosperms
- Clade: Eudicots
- Clade: Rosids
- Order: Rosales
- Family: Rosaceae
- Genus: Crataegus
- Section: Crataegus sect. Coccineae
- Series: Crataegus ser. Parvifoliae
- Species: C. uniflora

Binomial name
- Crataegus uniflora Münchh.

= Crataegus uniflora =

Species of hawthorn

Crataegus uniflora is a species of hawthorn known by the common name one-flowered hawthorn, or dwarf hawthorn. It is native to parts of the southeastern United States. The plant is usually a small bush, but some forms can be a few meters tall. The flowers occur singly or in small clusters. It is a hermaphroditic species. The fruit are hairy and yellow to reddish in colour.

== Habitat ==
C. uniflora can be found in a wide variety of habitats. It thrives in open light and shaded environments in moist loamy soils, loamy sands, and dry sand.
