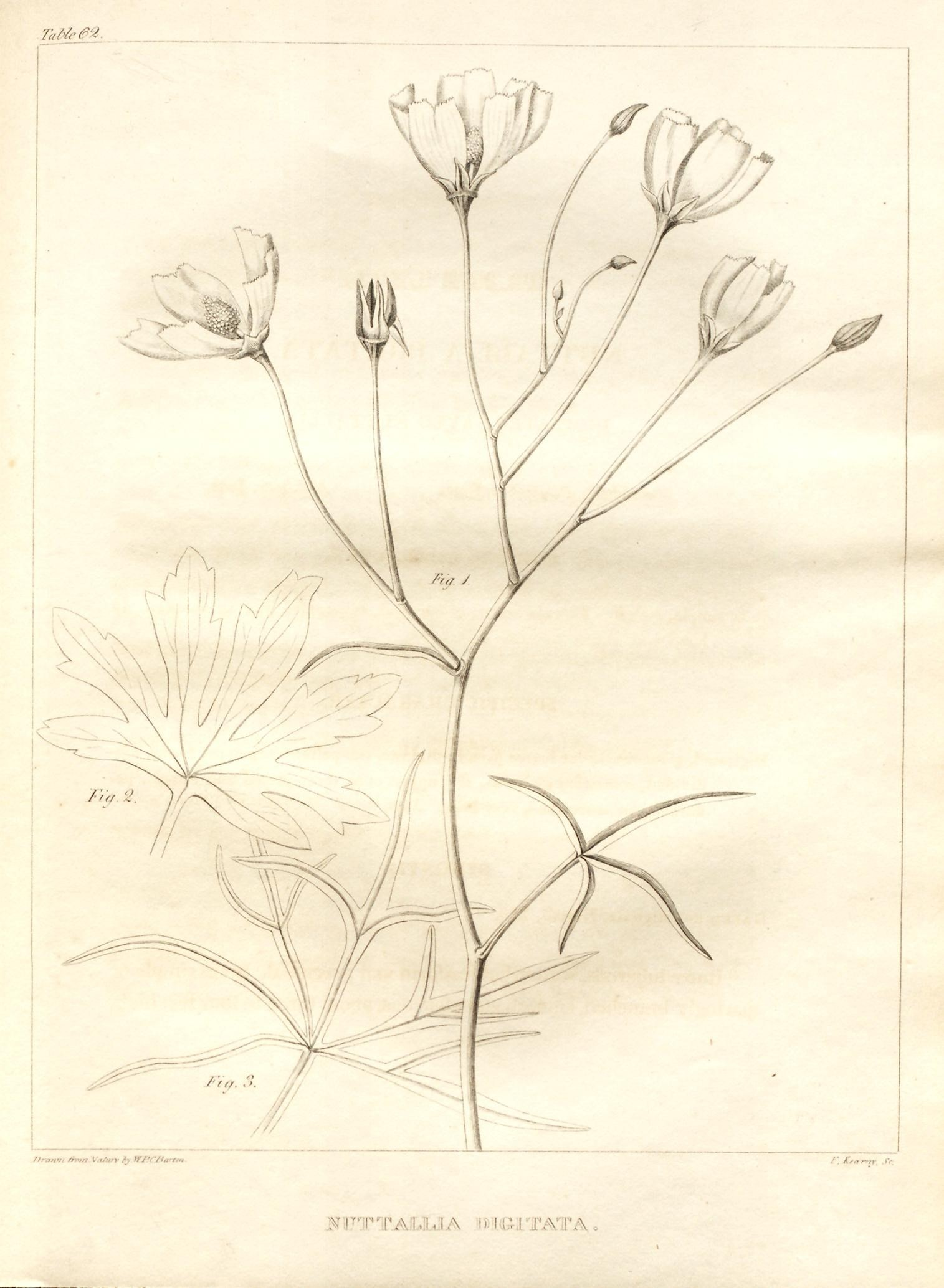
- A faded botanical illustration

Scientific classification
- Kingdom: Plantae
- Clade: Tracheophytes
- Clade: Angiosperms
- Clade: Eudicots
- Clade: Rosids
- Order: Malvales
- Family: Malvaceae
- Genus: Callirhoe
- Species: C. digitata

Binomial name
- Callirhoe digitata Nutt.

Synonyms
- List: Malva digitata (Nutt.) Torr. & A.Gray; Monolix digitata (Nutt.) Raf.; Nuttallia cordata Lindl.; Nuttallia digitata (Nutt.) W.P.C.Barton; Sesquicella digitata (Nutt.) Alef.; Sida digitata (Nutt.) Spreng.; Sida pedata Spreng.

= Callirhoe digitata =

Species of plant in the family Malvaceae

Callirhoe digitata, the fringed poppy mallow or standing wine cup, is a species of flowering plant in the family Malvaceae, native to the U.S. states of Kansas, Oklahoma, Missouri, Arkansas, and Alabama, and introduced to Illinois. A perennial with magenta flowers, in the wild it prefers to grow in sunny areas with drier, more alkaline soils. Recommended for both formal and informal plantings, it is hardy in USDA zones 5 through 8, and once established it is drought resistant.
