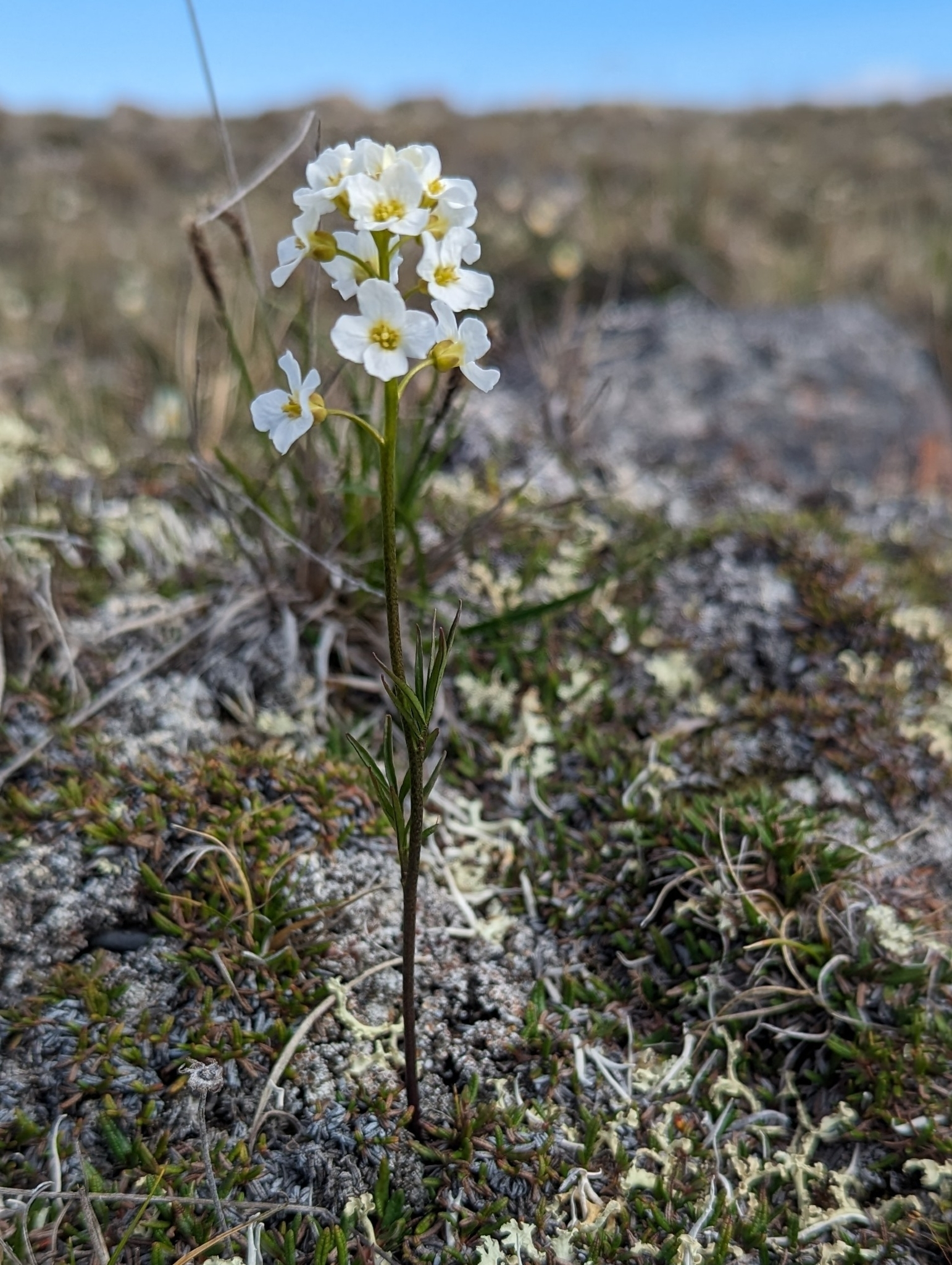

Scientific classification
- Kingdom: Plantae
- Clade: Tracheophytes
- Clade: Angiosperms
- Clade: Eudicots
- Clade: Rosids
- Order: Brassicales
- Family: Brassicaceae
- Genus: Cardamine
- Species: C. digitata

Binomial name
- Cardamine digitata Richards.

Synonyms
- List: Cardamine hyperborea O.E.Schulz; Cardamine oxyphylla Andrz. ex Ledeb.; Cardamine petersiana (Graebn.) Kuntze; Cardamine richardsonii Hultén; Cardamine sphenophylla Jurtzev; Dentaria petersiana Graebn.

= Cardamine digitata =

Species of flowering plant

Cardamine digitata, commonly known as Richardson's bittercress, is an ornamental species of plant in the family Brassicaceae. It is native to Alaska and Canada.
