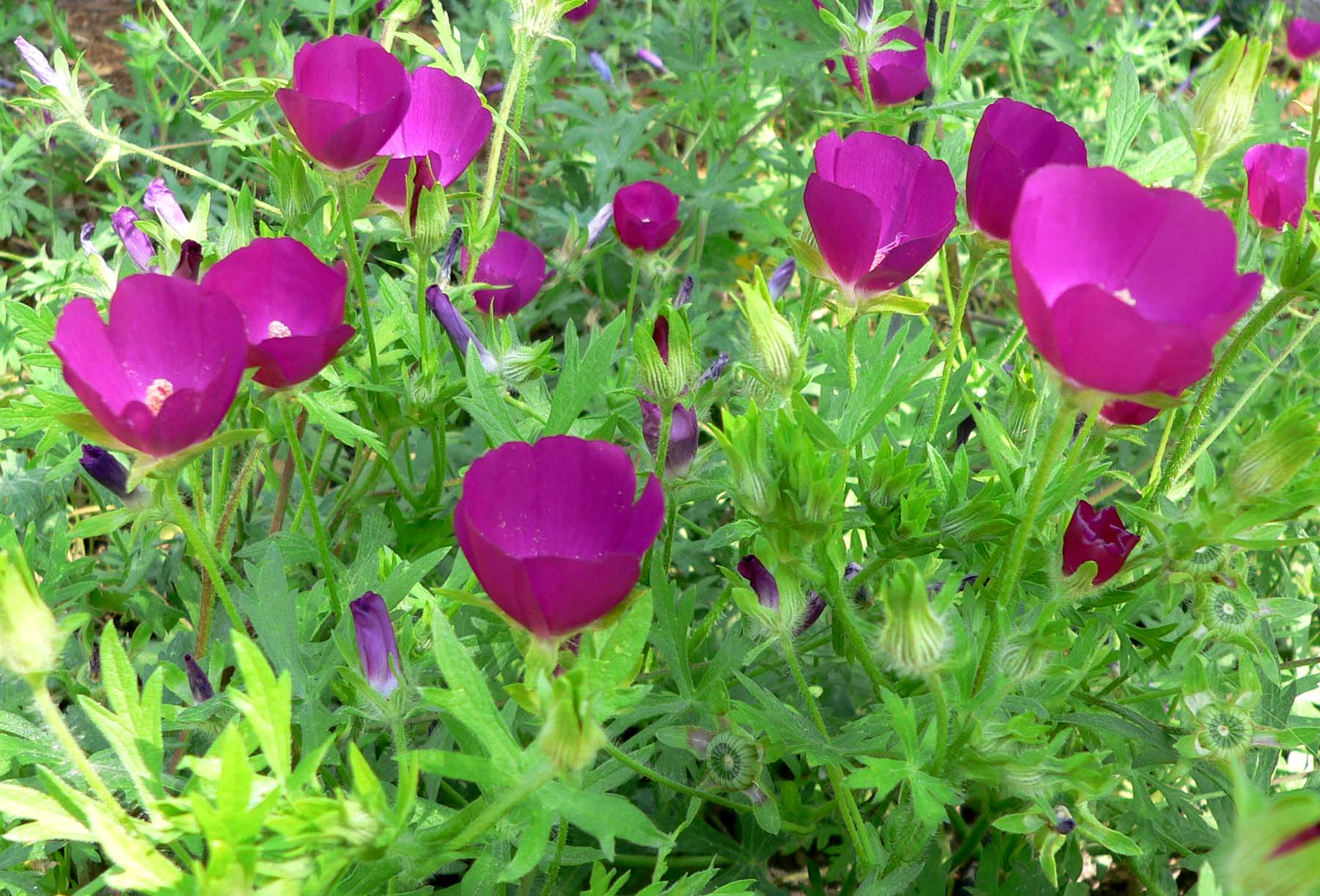
- Purple poppy mallow (C. involucrata)

Scientific classification
- Kingdom: Plantae
- Clade: Tracheophytes
- Clade: Angiosperms
- Clade: Eudicots
- Clade: Rosids
- Order: Malvales
- Family: Malvaceae
- Subfamily: Malvoideae
- Tribe: Malveae
- Genus: Callirhoe; Nutt.

Species
- see text

Synonyms
- Nuttallia Barton

= Callirhoe (plant) =

Genus of flowering plants

Callirhoe is a genus of flowering plants in the mallow family, Malvaceae. Its nine species are commonly known as poppy mallows and all are native to the prairies and grasslands of North America. Of the nine species, some are annuals while others are perennial plants.

The genus is named for the Oceanid Callirrhoe in Greek mythology.

Poppy mallow leaves are alternate and palmately lobed. The flowers are cup-shaped and brightly colored.

The purple poppy mallow (Callirhoe involucrata) is grown as a garden plant. It is a low-growing perennial with a large taproot and hairy stems. The flowers range from cerise to reddish violet with white centers. It is especially used in dry climates.

Species include:

- Callirhoe bushii Fernald – Bush's poppy mallow
- Callirhoe digitata Nutt. – fringed poppy mallow, winecup
- Callirhoe involucrata (Torr. & A.Gray) A.Gray – purple poppy mallow, winecup
- Callirhoe leiocarpa R.F.Martin – tall poppy mallow
- Callirhoe papaver (Cav.) A.Gray – woodland poppy mallow
- Callirhoe pedata (Nutt. ex Hook.) A.Gray – palmleaf poppy mallow
- Callirhoe scabriuscula B.L.Rob. – Texas poppy mallow
- Callirhoe triangulata (Leavenw.) A.Gray – clustered poppy mallow

== Formerly placed here ==
- Sidalcea oregana spicata (Regel) C.L.Hitchc. (as C. spicata Regel)
