= Cedars of Lebanon State Park =

State park in Tennessee, United States

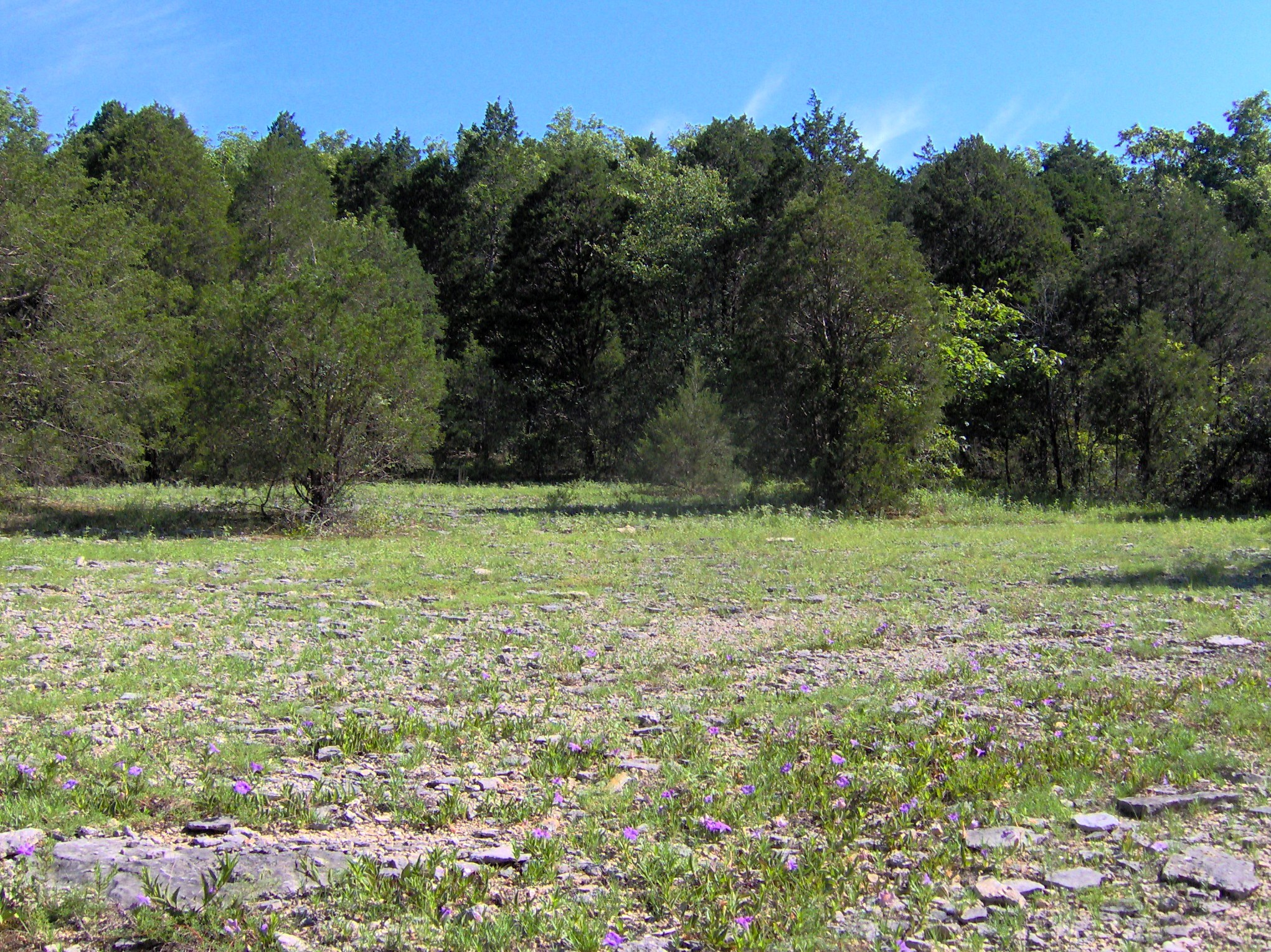
- cedar glade
- Interactive map of Cedars of Lebanon State Park
- Type: Tennessee State Park
- Location: Lebanon, Tennessee
- Coordinates: 36.07366°N 86.31151°W
- Area: 900 acres (364 ha)
- Operator: Tennessee Department of Environment and Conservation
- Website: Cedars of Lebanon State Park
- Cedars of Lebanon State Park Historic District
- U.S. National Register of Historic Places
- U.S. Historic district
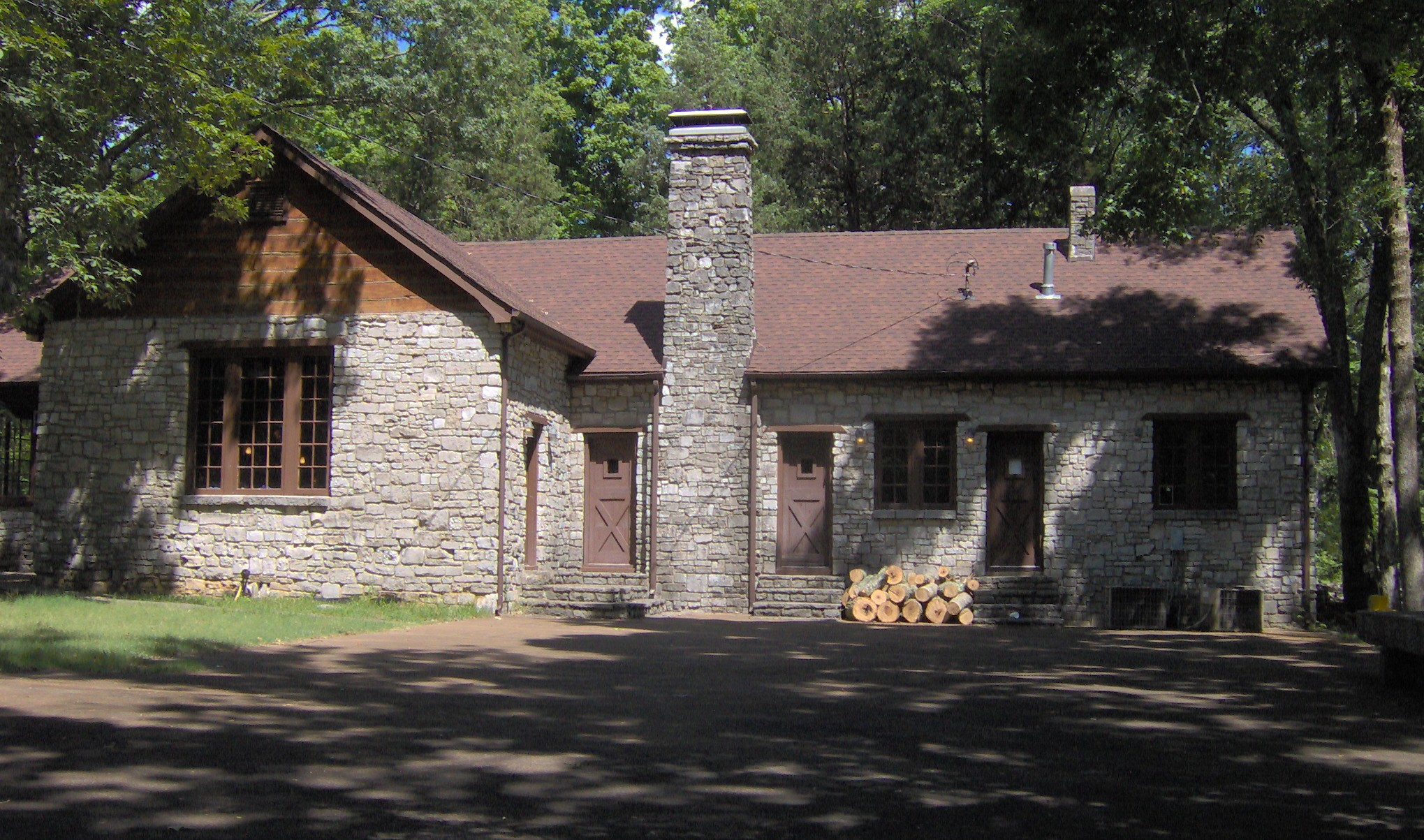
- Cedar Lodge
- Nearest city: Lebanon, Tennessee
- Built: 1925-1949
- NRHP reference No.: 95001274
- Added to NRHP: 1995

Cedars of Lebanon State Park is a state park in Wilson County, Tennessee, in the southeastern United States. It consists of 900 acres (364 ha) situated amidst the 9,420-acre (3,810 ha) Cedars of Lebanon State Forest. The park and forest are approximately 10 miles (16 km) south of Lebanon, Tennessee.

Cedars of Lebanon State Forest is known for its cedar glades, a unique type of ecosystem that has adapted to the thin (or nonexistent) soil layers that often occur in the eastern Central Basin. These glades are typically flanked by thick stands of red cedar, a type of juniper tree that can survive in soil layers too thin to support most large wooded plants. The presence of the red cedar in the basin reminded the region's early Euro-American settlers of the Lebanese cedar forests of Biblical fame.

== Geographical setting ==
Cedars of Lebanon State Park is situated in the eastern Central Basin approximately 15 miles (24 km) west of the eastern Highland Rim, 15 miles (24 km) east of Nashville and 20 miles (32 km) north of Murfreesboro. U.S. Route 231, which runs north-to-south, splits the state forest into eastern and western sections. The state park (i.e., the developed area) is located in the eastern section along Cedar Forest Road. The western section consists of an undeveloped state forest. 1,043 acres (422 ha) of the western section has been classified as a state natural area.

Like most karst areas, Cedars of Lebanon State Forest is drained in large part by underground streams. The water in the forest likely flows into nearby streams, such as Hurricane Creek. These streams empty into the Stones River's J. Percy Priest Lake impoundment, which is located a few miles west of the park.

== Natural information ==
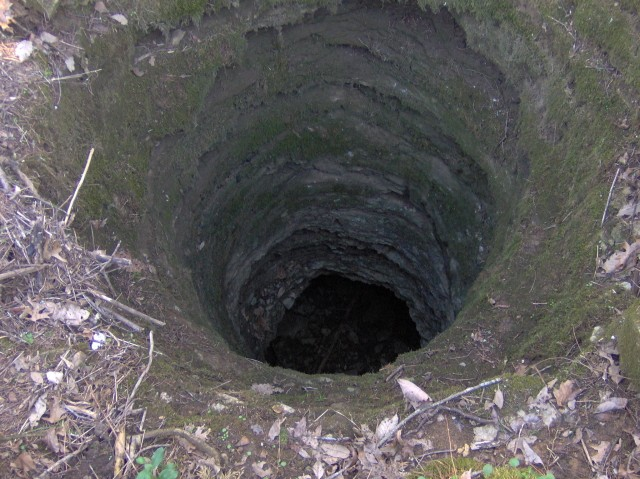
Sinkhole along the Hidden Springs Trail

Cedars of Lebanon State Forest is underlain by Ordovician period limestone, formed roughly 460 million years ago from calcareous ooze deposited by a primordial sea that once covered Middle Tennessee. Weathering of this rock has led to the creation of karst formations such as joints, underground streams, caves, and sinkholes, which are common throughout the park and forest. The forest is located in a flat section of the Central Basin characterized by thin soil layers where the limestone bedrock is often exposed.

Cedar glade communities have adapted to the basin's harsh barrens, where the soil is too thin to support most plant types, especially large wooded plants. The glades are typically open areas resembling rock or gravel-strewn meadows. Most glades include small areas of bare rock where nothing grows, gravelly areas where only grasses grow, and patches of very thin soil that support shrubs and small red cedars. Cedar glades are typically surrounded by stands of red cedar known as cedar thickets. Beyond the cedar thickets, the soil is thick enough to support a hardwood forest consisting primarily of oak and hickory.

The cedar glades of Cedars of Lebanon State Forest are home to 350 plant species, 29 of which are endemic to the cedar glades. Flowering plant species living in the glades include the formerly endangered Tennessee Coneflower (Echinacea tennesseensis), the Prickly Pear cactus (Opuntia humifusa), Limestone flame flower (Phemeranthus calcaricus), Gattinger's Prairie Clover (Dalea gattingeri), Glade Phlox (Phlox bifida), and Nashville Breadroot (Pediomelum subacaule). Nonflowering plants include reindeer moss and glade moss. Along with the red cedar, trees in the surrounding forest include white oak and shagbark hickory. Wildlife chiefly consists of rodents and birds.

== History ==
The earliest Euro-American settlers arrived in Wilson County in the late 1790s. The city of Lebanon, established in 1802, was named after the abundance of red cedar in the area. The settlers believed (mistakenly) that the red cedar stands were similar to the cedar forests of ancient Lebanon, which were harvested by Phoenician city-states and used in the construction of the Temple of Solomon. The first Wilson County courthouse and many other early structures in the county were constructed using red cedar logs.

For much of the 19th century, the barren glades were largely devoid of human habitation, with the exception of a few small farms. In an 1879 essay on the history of Wilson County, James Drake described the various soil types in the county, which included a "dark soil, peculiar to the cedar flats, the least desirable of any we have, and subject to drought, being usually near the rock." The town of Gladeville was established in 1852 just west of the modern state forest boundaries and grew into a sizeable hamlet until the outbreak of the American Civil War.

In the late 19th and early 20th centuries, the high demand for lumber led to the harvesting of most of the forests in the Central Basin. Red cedar in particular was popular for use in the making of furniture, fence rails, and pencils. In the cedar flats of Wilson County, small farmers were struggling with depletion of the already-thin soil layer caused by poor farming tactics. In 1935, as part of the New Deal, the federal government initiated a plan to resettle farmers living in badly eroded lands to allow the devastated forests to recover. As part of the Lebanon Cedar Forest Project, the federal Resettlement Administration helped move the farmers in the cedar flats to new locations, and the Works Project Administration constructed forestry and recreational facilities and planted thousands of red cedar seedlings. The work was supervised by the United States Forestry Service. "Lebanon Cedar Forest" officially opened in 1937, with local newspaper editor Dixon Merritt presiding over the opening ceremony. Although the land was managed by the Tennessee Department of Conservation, the federal government retained ownership until 1955.

Botanists began noting the ecological importance of the cedar glades as early as 1901, when German-born doctor Augustin Gattinger (1825–1903) mentioned the glades in his book The Flora of Tennessee and the Philosophy of Botany. Research conducted by Elsie Quarterman of Vanderbilt University led to the forest's designation as a National Natural Landmark in 1973. In 1995, Cedar Lodge and several other structures built by the WPA in the 1930s and 1940s were placed on the National Register of Historic Places.

== The park today ==
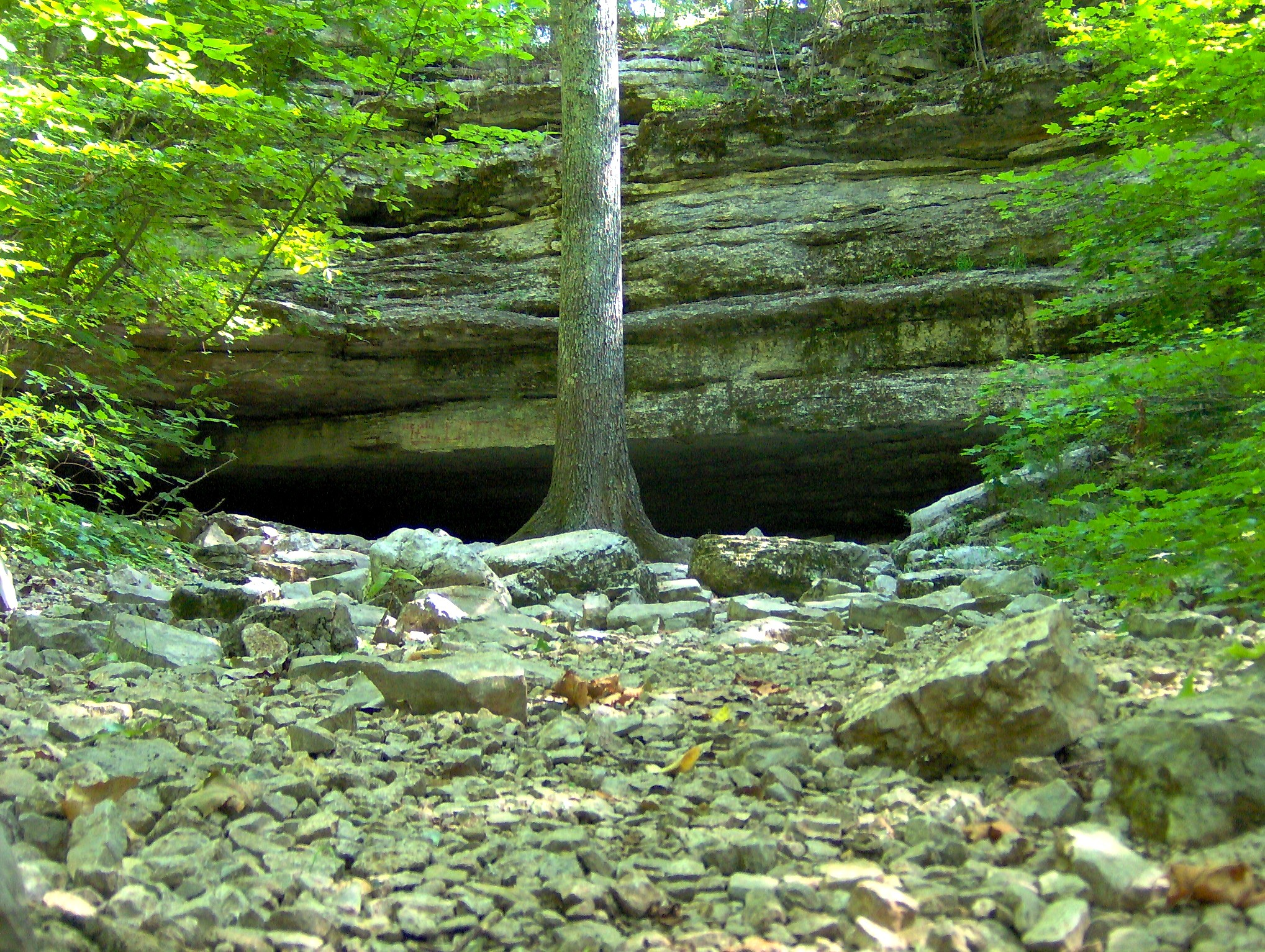
Jackson Cave

Cedars of Lebanon State Park has 117 campsites, 11 picnic shelters, 8 miles (13 km) of hiking trails, a group lodge, and a meeting hall. A small museum, the Dixon Merritt Nature Center, displays some of the forest's natural features. The park also maintains a disc golf course. The disc golf course was designed with help from the "Father of Disc Golf," Ed Headrick, in 1977. It is an 18-hole short course landscaped through cedar woods with limestone karst topography. The throws are short but technical. The course stays busy year round and is used frequently by local disc golfers.

The park's eight miles (13 km) of hiking trails range in size from 0.5 to 5 miles (0.8 to 8 km). The 0.5-mile (0.8 km) Cedar Glades Trail, which begins at the park visitor center, is a self-guided interpretive trail that crosses several cedar glade habitats characteristic of glades found in the eastern basin. The 2-mile (3.2 km) Cedar Forest Trail, which begins near the junction of Cedar Forest Road and WPA Road, loops through a mixed oak-hickory and red cedar forest and passes several sizeable sinkholes and blockfields. The 0.5-mile (0.8 km) Dixon Merritt Trail begins behind the Merritt Nature Center and provides access to Jackson Cave. The 0.5-mile (0.8 km) Limestone Sinks Trail is another self-guided trail that passes several large limestone sinks. The 5-mile (8 km) Hidden Springs Trail, which starts near the picnic area, loops through multiple terrain types characteristic of the state forest, including a large limestone sink and associated dry streambed, several substantial cedar glades, and a dense stand of mixed red cedar and oak-hickory forest.

Jackson Cave is one of 18 known caves located in the state forest and the immediate vicinity. The cave's entrance is 30 feet (9.1 m) wide and 4 feet (1.2 m) high, and the cave corridor has an average width of 12 feet (3.7 m) and an average height of 6 feet (1.8 m). The cave extends approximately 1,000 feet (300 m) from its entrance to a large pool of water.

== Photo gallery ==
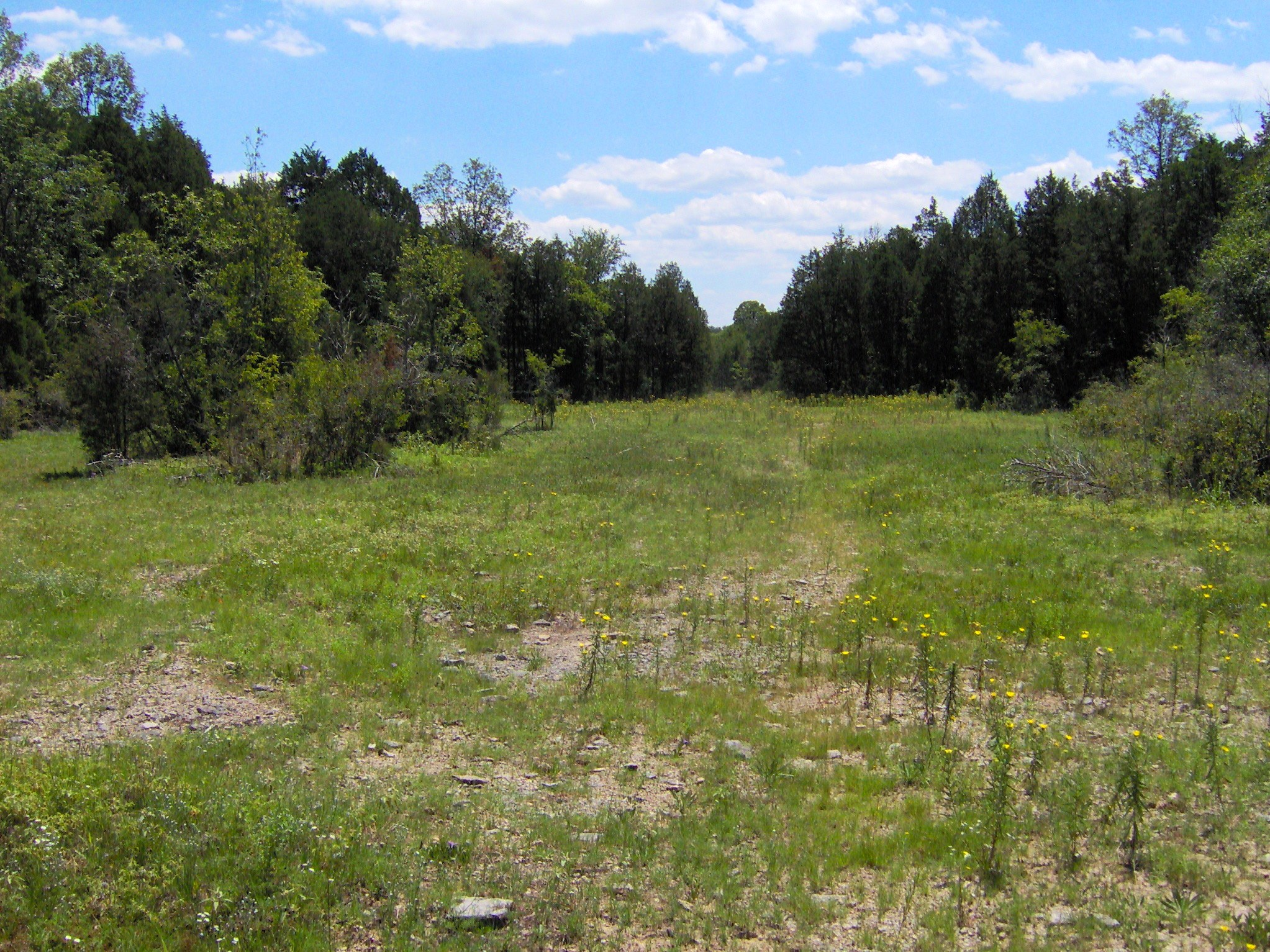
Cedar glade along Hidden Springs Trail

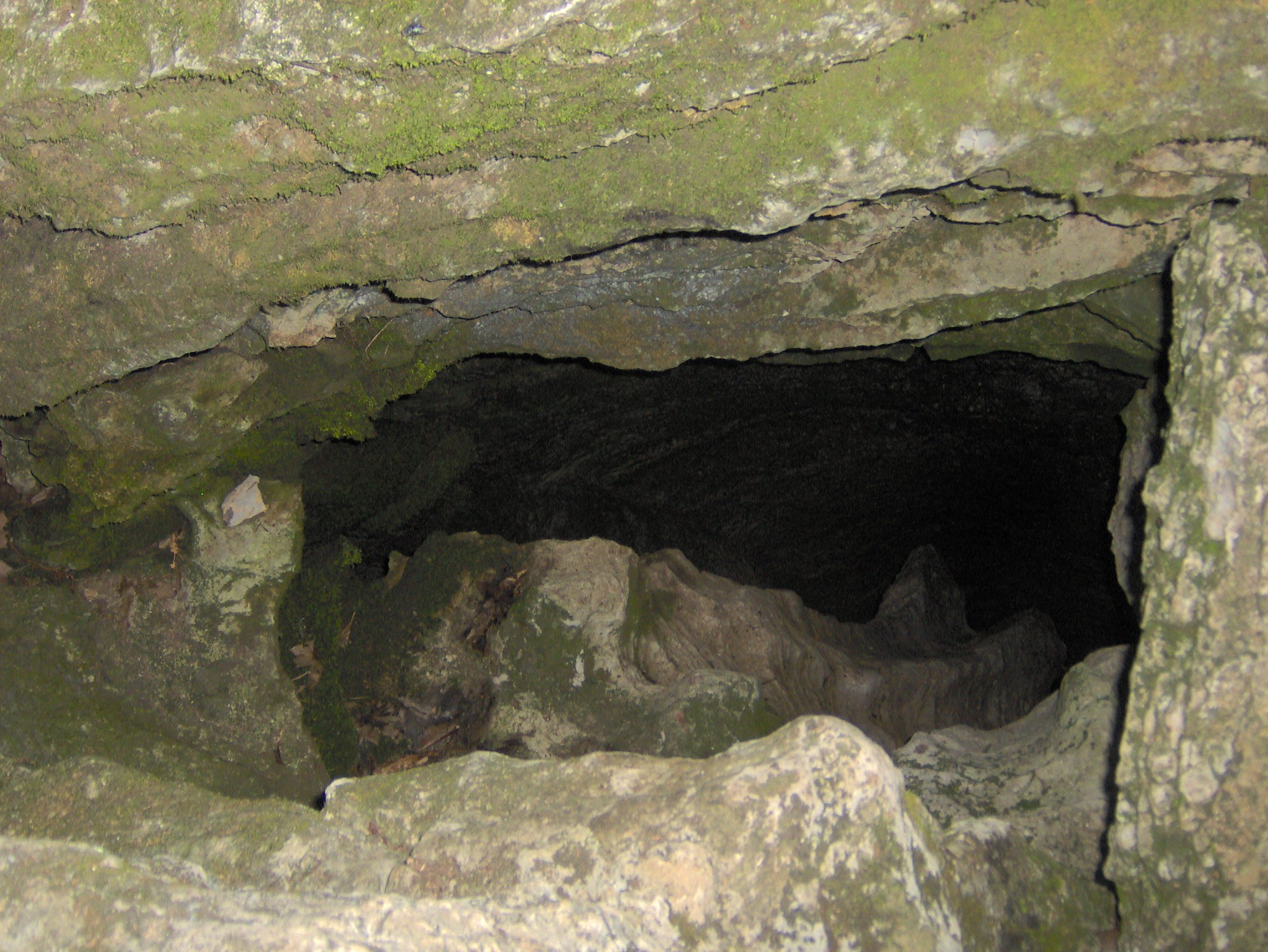
Sinkhole along the Cedar Forest Trail

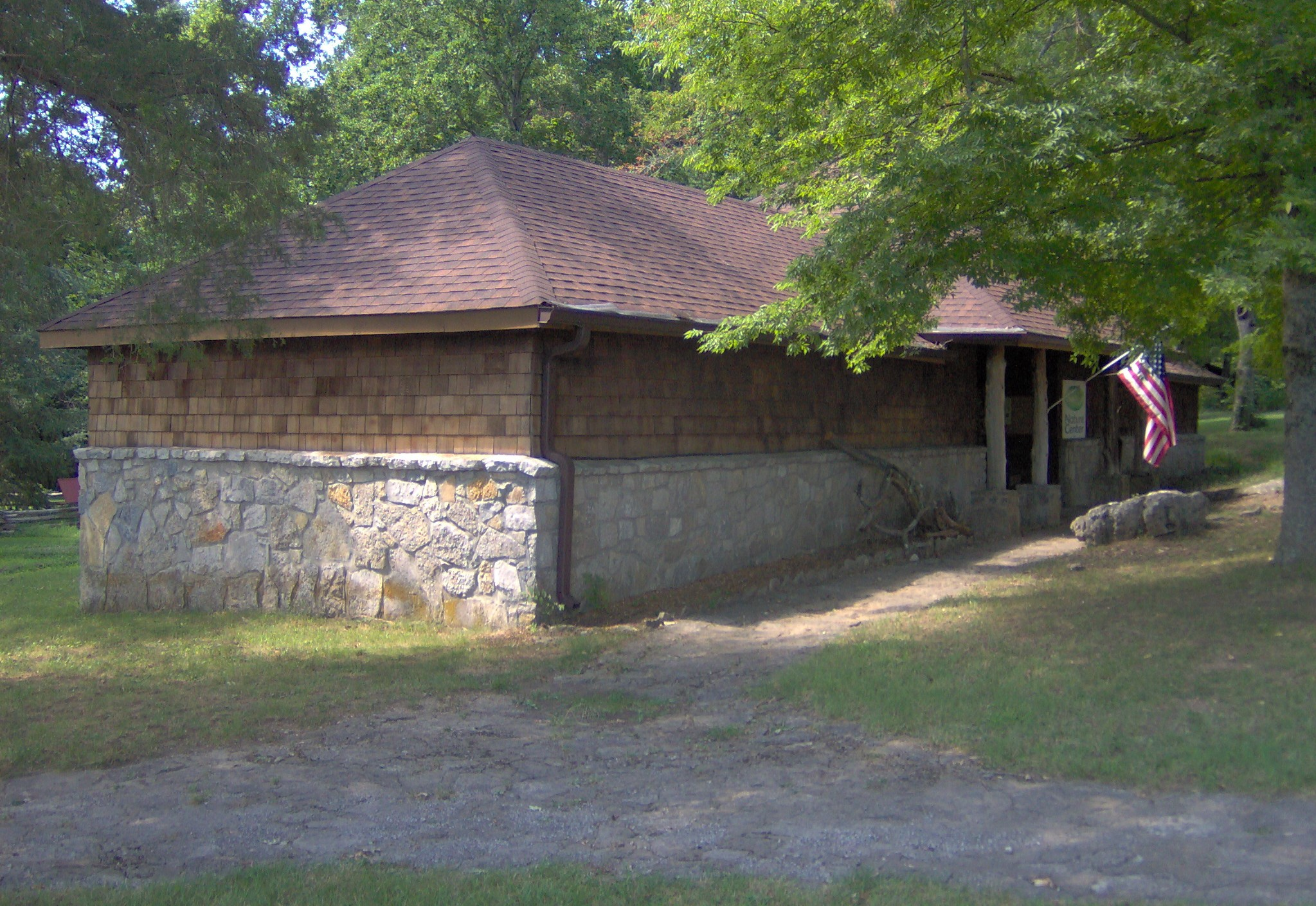
Merritt Nature Center

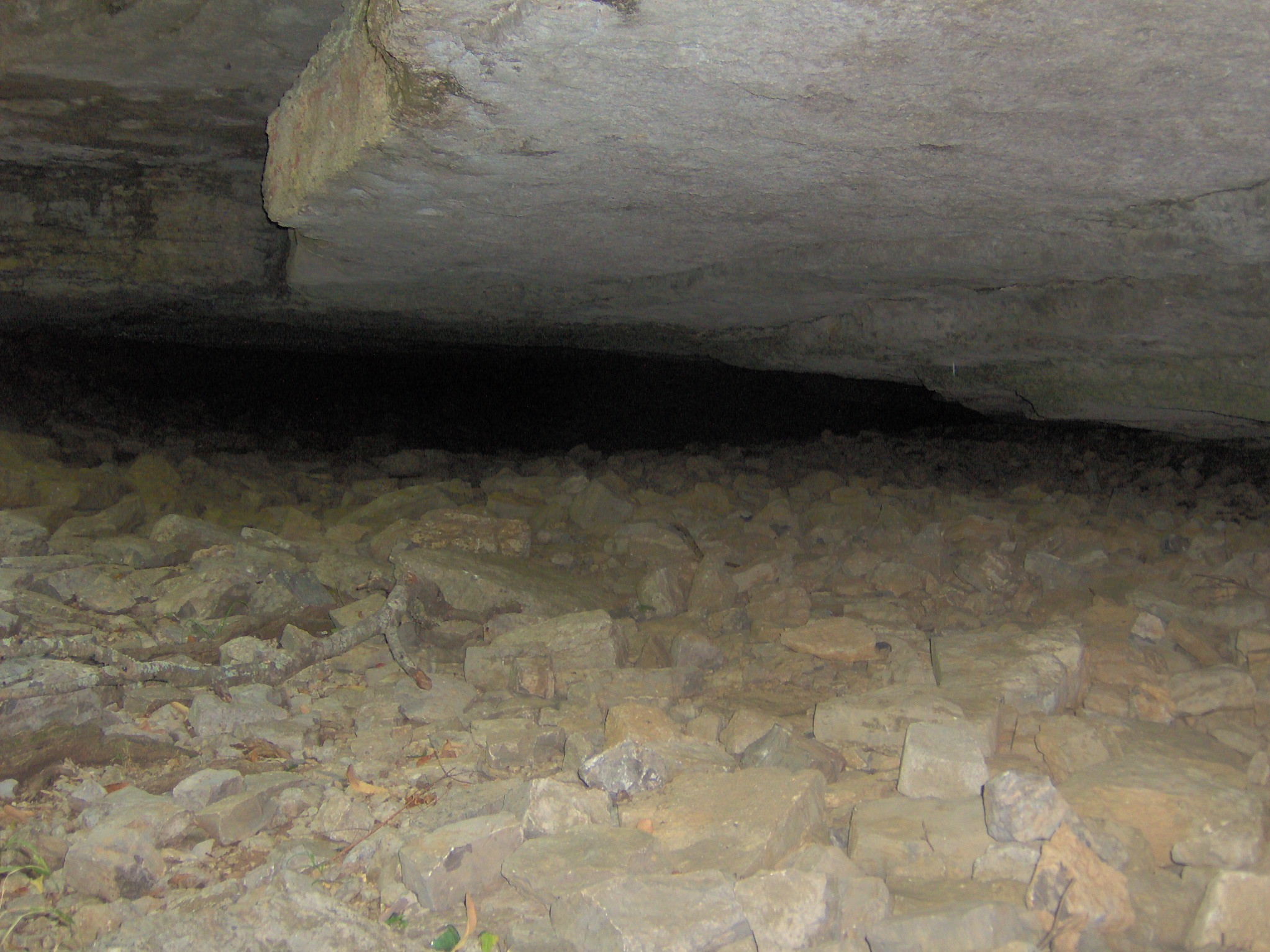
Entrance to Jackson Cave

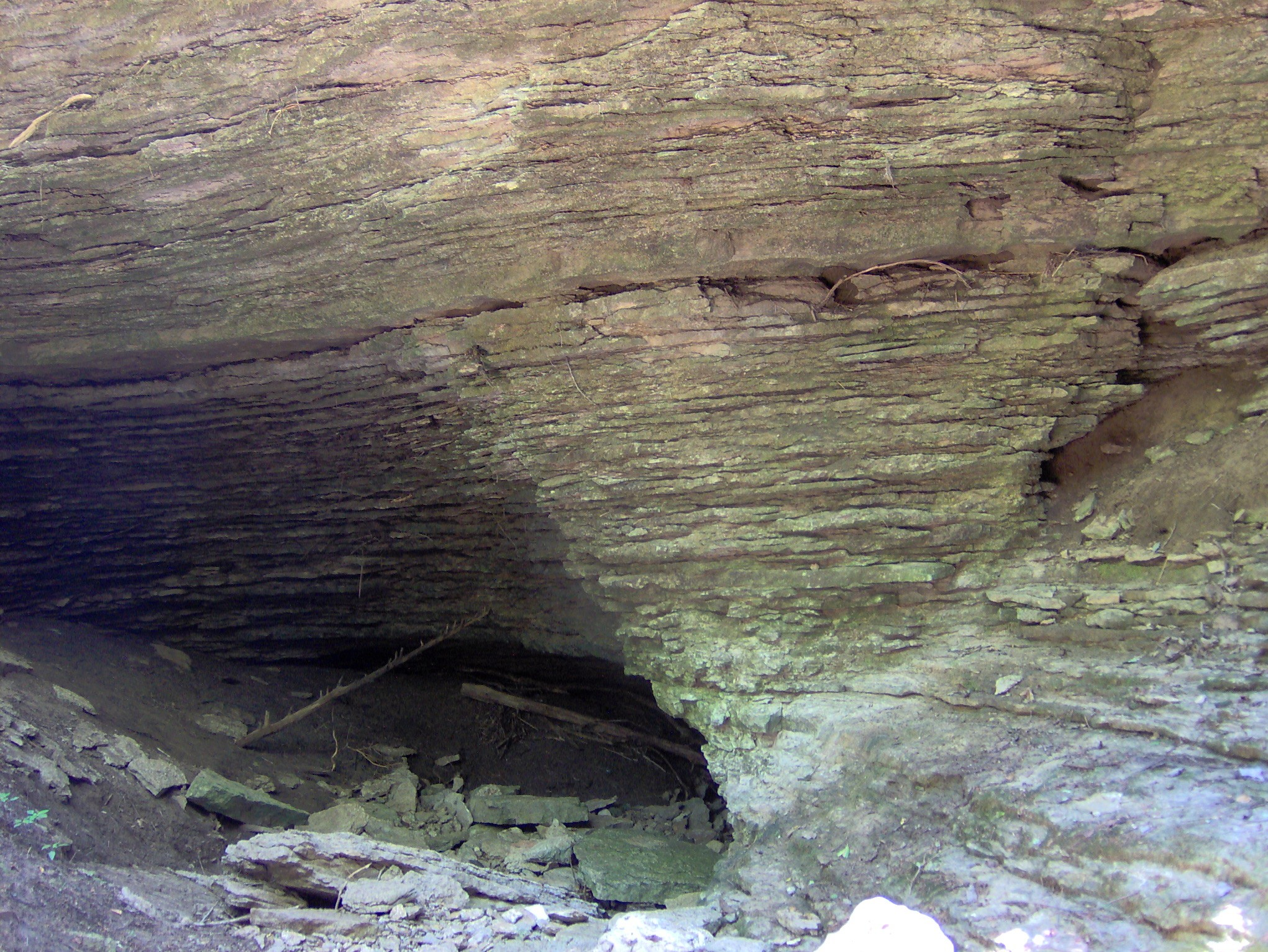
The wall of a large sinkhole along the Hidden Springs Trail

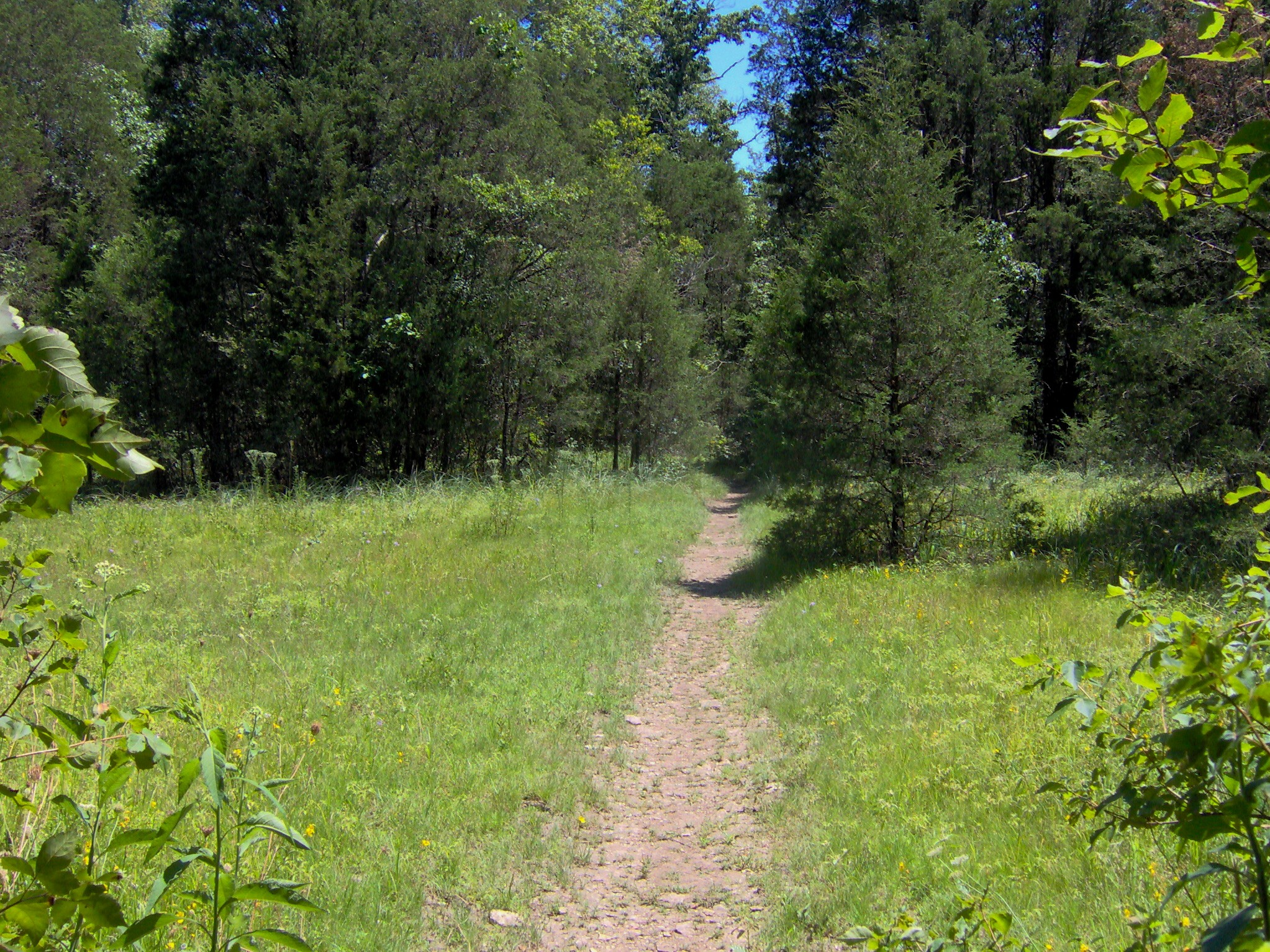
Hidden Springs Trail crossing a cedar glade

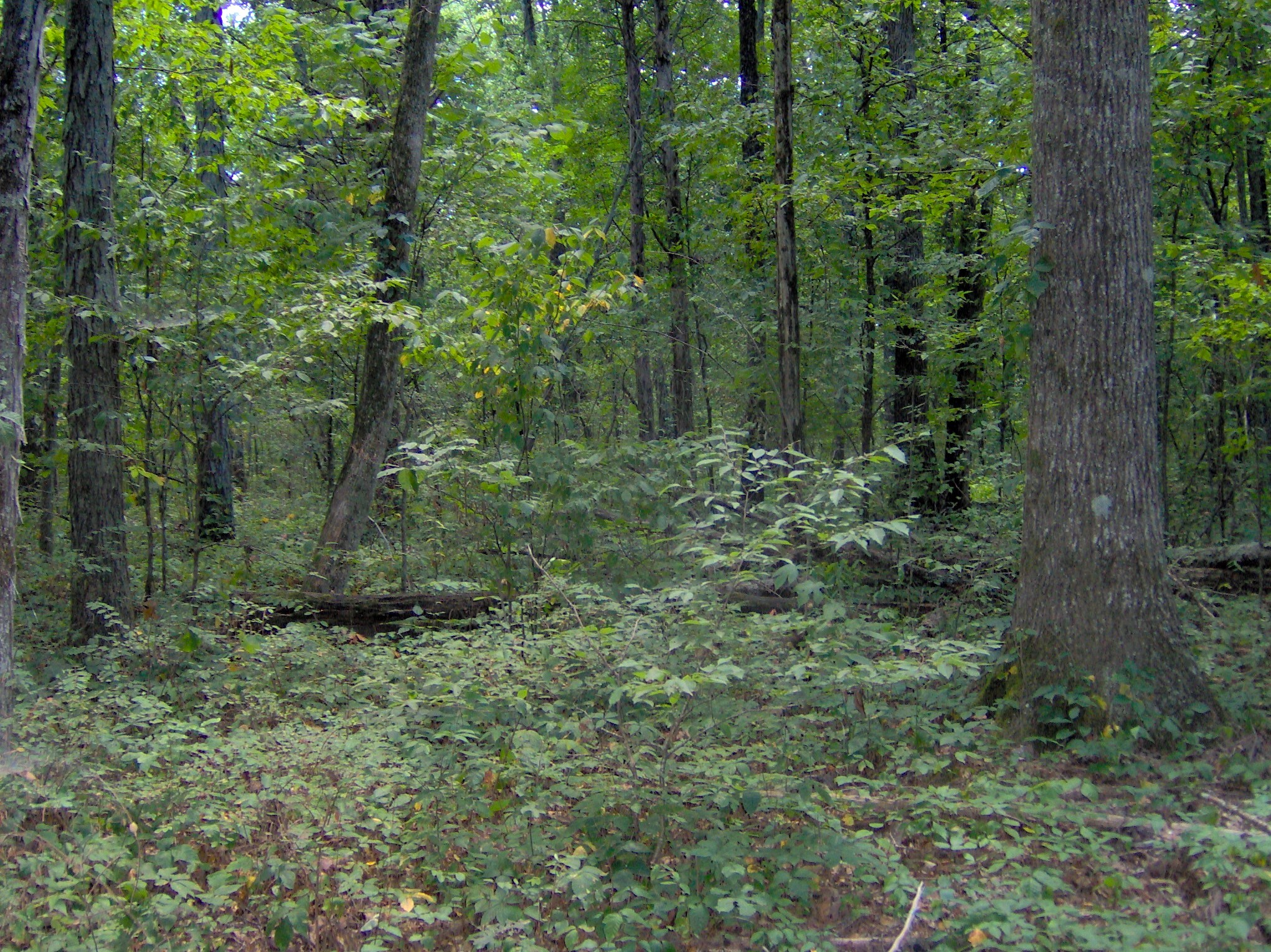
Oak-hickory forest along Hidden Springs Trail

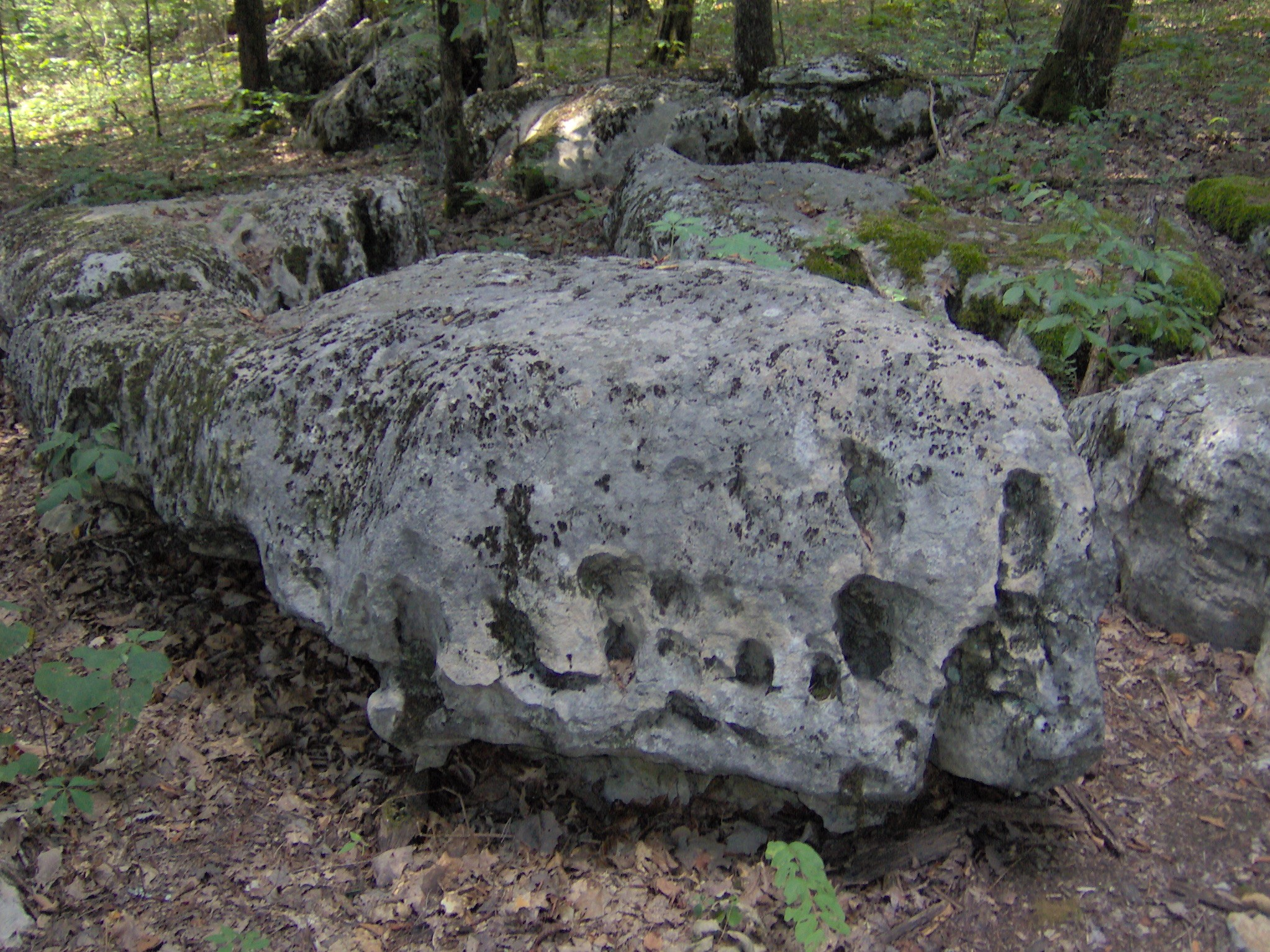
Blockfield along the Cedar Forest Trail

== See also ==
- Breakin' Up Winter
