= Calcareous glade =

Type of ecological community found in the US

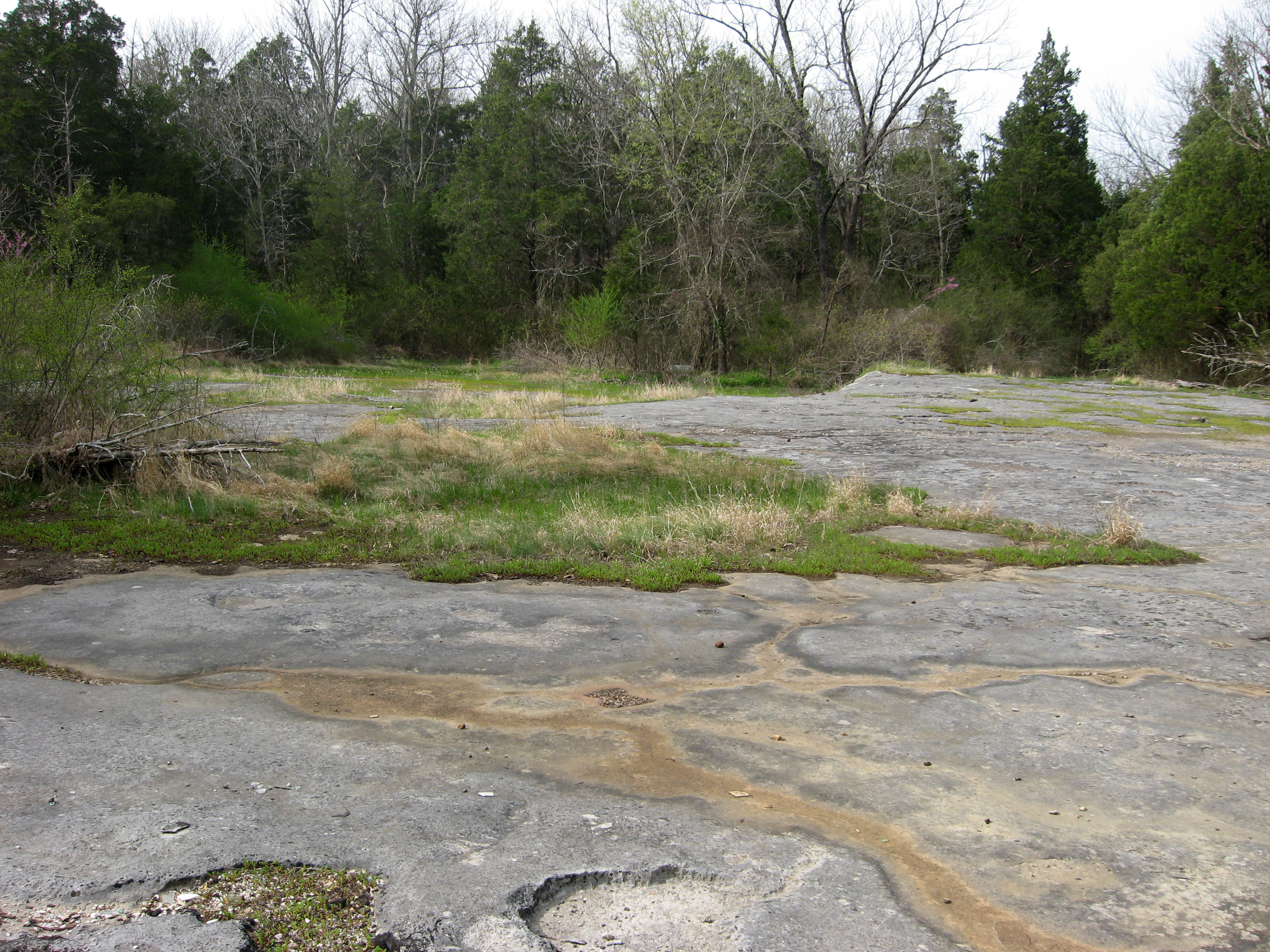
Limestone glade in the Pennyroyal Plain, Simpson County, Kentucky

A calcareous glade is a type of ecological community that is found in the central Eastern United States. Calcareous glades occur where bedrock such as limestone occurs near or at the surface, and have very shallow and little soil development. Due to the shallow soil and the extreme conditions created by it, trees are often unable to grow in the glades. This creates a habitat that is usually sunny, dry, and hot. Calcareous glade vegetation is more similar to that of a desert habitat than a grassland, being dominated by small spring annuals with occasional geophytic or succulent perennials.

The usage of the words "glades" and "barrens" to describe dry, rocky communities in the United States is not uniform, and the terms are often used interchangeably. Calcareous glade communities can intergrade with dry rocky prairies, particularly in sloping habitats. Due to their unsuitability for agriculture, glade communities have survived to the present day at a higher rate than deeper-soil prairie communities.

== Interior Low Plateau glades ==
The Interior Low Plateau is a region in the Upper South that is known for its calcareous glade communities. This region is centered in Tennessee and Kentucky, and extends into northern Alabama, and southern Illinois, southern Indiana, and southern Ohio. These glades are best developed in the area of the Central Basin (or Nashville Basin) in Tennessee, where they are geographically widespread and harbor high levels of endemism. Outside of the Central Basin, calcareous glades are found in lower numbers throughout the Interior Low Plateau, and species endemism is greatly reduced. Glades in the Interior Low Plateaus are characterized by species such as one-flower gladecress (Leavenworthia uniflora), limestone skullcap (Scutellaria parvula), widow's-cross stonecrop (Sedum pulchellum), poverty dropseed (Sporobolus vaginiflorus) and glade violet (Viola egglestonii).

=== Central Basin cedar glades ===
The limestone glades of the Central Basin in Tennessee are often called "cedar glades". The name comes from the abundance of eastern red cedar (Juniperus virginiana) that occurs on the margins of the glades or in cracks in the bedrock where the roots can gain a foothold.

Many of the characteristic plants that grow in the limestone glades of the Central Basin are endemics that occur nowhere else, or disjunct populations of plants that are widespread in the prairies of the central U.S. Some species with highly restricted ranges that occur in the glades of the Central Basin include the Tennessee coneflower (Echinacea tennesseensis), Pyne's ground plum (Astragalus bibullatus), leafy prairie clover (Dalea foliosa), Tennessee milkvetch (Astragalus tennesseensis), Nashville breadroot (Pediomelum subacaule), and limestone fameflower (Phemeranthus calcaricus).

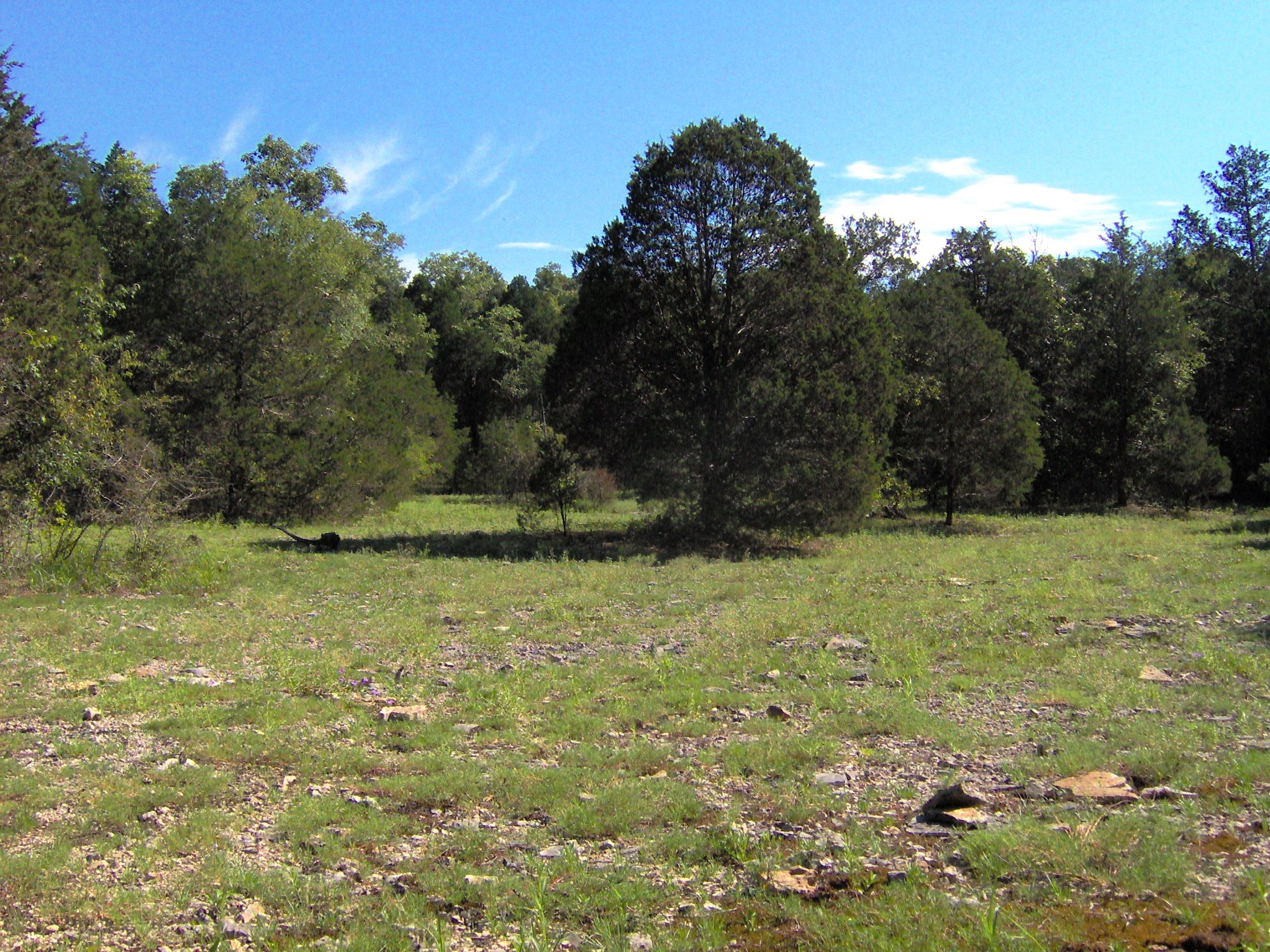
"Cedar glade" in the Nashville Basin, Wilson County, Tennessee

These glades can be saturated with water in the winter and spring, leading to "xerohydric" (dry/wet alternating) conditions.

=== Threats to the cedar glades ===
The central basin (or Nashville Basin) of Tennessee is one of the largest areas containing limestone glades. Because of the rapid growth of metropolitan Nashville and the surrounding cities of Murfreesboro and Lebanon, many of the limestone glades have been destroyed by development. The State of Tennessee and the Nature Conservancy have established a number of parks and preserves to protect important plant populations. Cedars of Lebanon State Park in Wilson County and Long Hunter State Park in Davidson County both protect substantial limestone glade ecosystems.

=== Limestone slope glades ===
The limestone slope glades of Kentucky are a globally vulnerable habitat consisting of limestone glades found on hillsides, which are wet in the spring but become very dry in the rest of the year. This provides habitat for unique species such as necklace glade cress, Butler's quillwort, and Crawe's sedge.

=== Endemic plant species ===
This is a list of calcareous glade-adapted plant species considered endemic to the Interior Low Plateau region. Some are found in only a single county of a single state.

- Astragalus bibullatus
- Astragalus tennesseensis
- Castilleja kraliana (Cahaba paintbrush)
- Clinopodium glabellum
- Dalea cahaba
- Dalea foliosa
- Dalea gattingeri
- Delphinium alabamicum
- Echinacea tennesseensis
- Eleocharis bifida (Cedar glade spike rush)
- Erigeron dolomiticola (Cahaba daisy fleabane)
- Hypericum dolabriforme (Glade St. John's wort)
- Leavenworthia uniflora
- Lithospermum decipiens (Deceptive marbleseed)
- Lobelia gattingeri (Gattinger's lobelia)
- Marshallia mohrii (Coosa Barbara's-buttons)
- Pediomelum subacaule
- Penstemon tenuiflorus (Limestone beardtongue)
- Phemeranthus calcaricus (Limestone fameflower)
- Physaria filiformis
- Rudbeckia grandiflora (Largeflower coneflower)
- Silphium glutinosum (Sticky rosinweed)
- Sisyrinchium calciphilum (Glade blue-eyed grass)
- Spigelia alabamensis (Alabama pinkroot)
- Symphyotrichum kentuckiense (Miss Price's aster)

== Ozark Mountains glades ==
A dolomite glade at Ava Glades, Missouri, some of the largest of their type on Earth.

Calcareous glades are well developed in the Ozark Mountains. In Missouri, the majority of these glades are found on dolomitic limestones, with less than 1% formed from calcitic limestone. Species indicative of Ozarkian calcareous glade communities include Cheilanthes feei (slender lip fern), Echinacea simulata (pale purple coneflower), Heliotropium tenellum (pasture heliotrope), Isoetes butleri (limestone quillwort), Oenothera macrocarpa (Missouri evening primrose), and Ophioglossum engelmannii (limestone adder's-tongue). In Missouri, Physaria filiformis (Missouri bladderpod) is a species restricted to calcitic limestone glades. The sloping terrain of glades in the Ozarks is distinct from the levelness of glades in the Southeastern US, causing faster soil erosion and a mosaic of plant distribution to form.

== Ridge and Valley glades ==
The Ridge-and-Valley Appalachians, which extend north from Pennsylvania south to Alabama, have significant calcareous glade communities. These glades often have dolomitic soils, resulting in a high magnesium content (in contrast to the glades of the Nashville Basin). In Virginia, these glades provide habitat for rare magnesiophiles such as Addison's leatherflower (Clematis addisonii), tall larkspur (Delphinium exaltatum), smooth coneflower (Echinacea laevigata), and glade wild quinine (Parthenium auriculatum).

At the southern end of the Ridge and Valley in Alabama in Bibb County, species endemism of glade communities peaks. This area, known as a Ketona Dolomite Outcrops, was first recognized as ecologically significant in 1992. Since its discovery, eight new plant taxa to science have been described from this region, in addition to the 60 species of conservation concern found in or around this community. Endemic species of this area include Castilleja kraliana, Dalea cahaba, Liatris oligocephala, Lithospermum decipiens, and Spigelia alabamensis.
