= Overbridge State Natural Area =

Class II Natural Area in Tennessee

Overbridge State Natural Park
- A photo in the park, looking toward Dry Creek
- Location: Tennessee
- Nearest city: Murfreesboro, Tennessee
- Area: 70 acres (28 ha)
- Max. elevation: 610
- Min. elevation: 600
- Established: 1995

Overbridge State Natural Area is a Class II Natural Area located in Rutherford County, Tennessee. It was designated in 1995, and covers 70 acres (28 ha), including portions of Dry Creek. It is home to a rare cedar glade, and other endangered species, including Dalea foliosa and Astragalus bibullatus.

== History ==
In 1993, the property was part of a larger 260-acre farm plot. It was purchased by the state. In 1995, it was listed as a Natural Area.

== Geography ==
The area is located in central Tennessee. Most of the land is forested. ADry Creek runs through it. The area is mostly flat.
