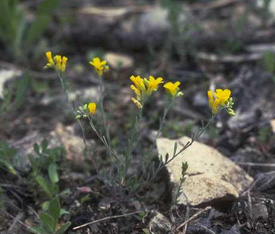

Conservation status
- Vulnerable (IUCN 3.1)

Scientific classification
- Kingdom: Plantae
- Clade: Tracheophytes
- Clade: Angiosperms
- Clade: Eudicots
- Clade: Rosids
- Order: Brassicales
- Family: Brassicaceae
- Genus: Physaria
- Species: P. filiformis

Binomial name
- Physaria filiformis (Rollins) O'Kane & Al-Shehbaz 2002

Synonyms
- Lesquerella filiformis Rollins 1956

= Physaria filiformis =

Species of plant

Physaria filiformis (syn. Lesquerella filiformis) is a rare species of flowering plant in the family Brassicaceae known by the common names Missouri bladderpod and limestone glade bladderpod. It is native to Missouri and Arkansas in the United States. It was federally listed as an endangered species in 1987 and it was downlisted to threatened status in 2003. P. filiformis remains listed as an endangered species at the state level in Missouri.

== Description ==
Physaria filiformis is an annual herb producing several slender, branching stems up to 25 centimeters (10 inches) tall, growing erect or drooping. The leaves vary in shape, and the basal ones reach 2.4 centimeters (0.96 inch) in length. Both the leaves and the stems have a dense covering of fine hairs, which gives the plant a silvery-gray appearance. The inflorescence is a raceme of pale yellow flowers with petals half a centimeter to nearly one centimeter (0.4 inch) long. The fruit is a spherical silique. The plant is a winter annual, sprouting and forming a basal rosette of leaves in the fall and then producing stems and flower the following spring. Seeds are dispersed on the wind and in surface runoff.

== Distribution and habitat ==
Physaria filiformis grows in limestone glades and outcrops of bare bedrock in southwestern Missouri and northwestern Arkansas. The surrounding habitat may be prairie and pasture. Several types of forest may be adjacent to the glades. The soil is shallow on the glades and supports few other plants. The plant grows less often in more vegetated areas with deeper soils, probably because other plants successfully compete with it there. It is also less abundant in the shady understory of Juniperus virginiana forest, as sunlight is a limiting factor in its growth. It can be found in a number of microhabitats, a factor that is important in its management and conservation. Wildfire is important in the maintenance of the limestone glade habitat and even more so its surrounding ecotones. Fire is the mechanism that keeps these habitats open and free of large and woody vegetation that shade out small annuals. Fire prevents ecological succession in the open habitat where the plant grows.

As the health of the local ecosystem depends on fire, the practice of fire suppression has caused the degradation of the habitat. When fire is prevented, woody vegetation moves in, covering the glades and blocking the light from reaching this small plant. This encroachment of surrounding vegetation is a main threat to the species. Other threats include off-road vehicles, limestone mining, and urban development. Invasive species of plants have been introduced to the habitat, including Bromus tectorum, a competitive grass. The plant may be affected by grazing, trampling, and other disturbance, but these threats are mild because the plant can tolerate light disturbance.

== Conservation ==
When Physaria filiformis was designated an endangered species there were nine populations. Extensive surveys located more occurrences and many of these were put under the protection of a number of agencies, including the National Park Service and The Nature Conservancy. By 2003 there were about 60 populations and the outlook for the plant had improved enough to warrant its downlisting to threatened status.

Most occurrences of the plant are in southwestern Missouri. A large population can be found at Wilson's Creek National Battlefield. Other protected populations are being managed at Rocky Barrens Conservation Area (Missouri Department of Conservation), Greenfield Glade (The Nature Conservancy), and Bois d'Arc Conservation Area (Missouri Department of Conservation). Nearly all remaining sites are on privately owned land. Conservation activities include protection of the habitat in public areas, prescribed burns to replace the natural fire regime, and reduced use of herbicides.

To better inform conservation efforts, a recent study to understand genetic diversity and structure in Physaria filiformis was conducted and found there could be enough genetic variation between geographically isolated populations for them to be considered separate species. Whether or not a separate species is distinguished, protecting each separate population's genetic diversity is critical to help conservation efforts succeed.
