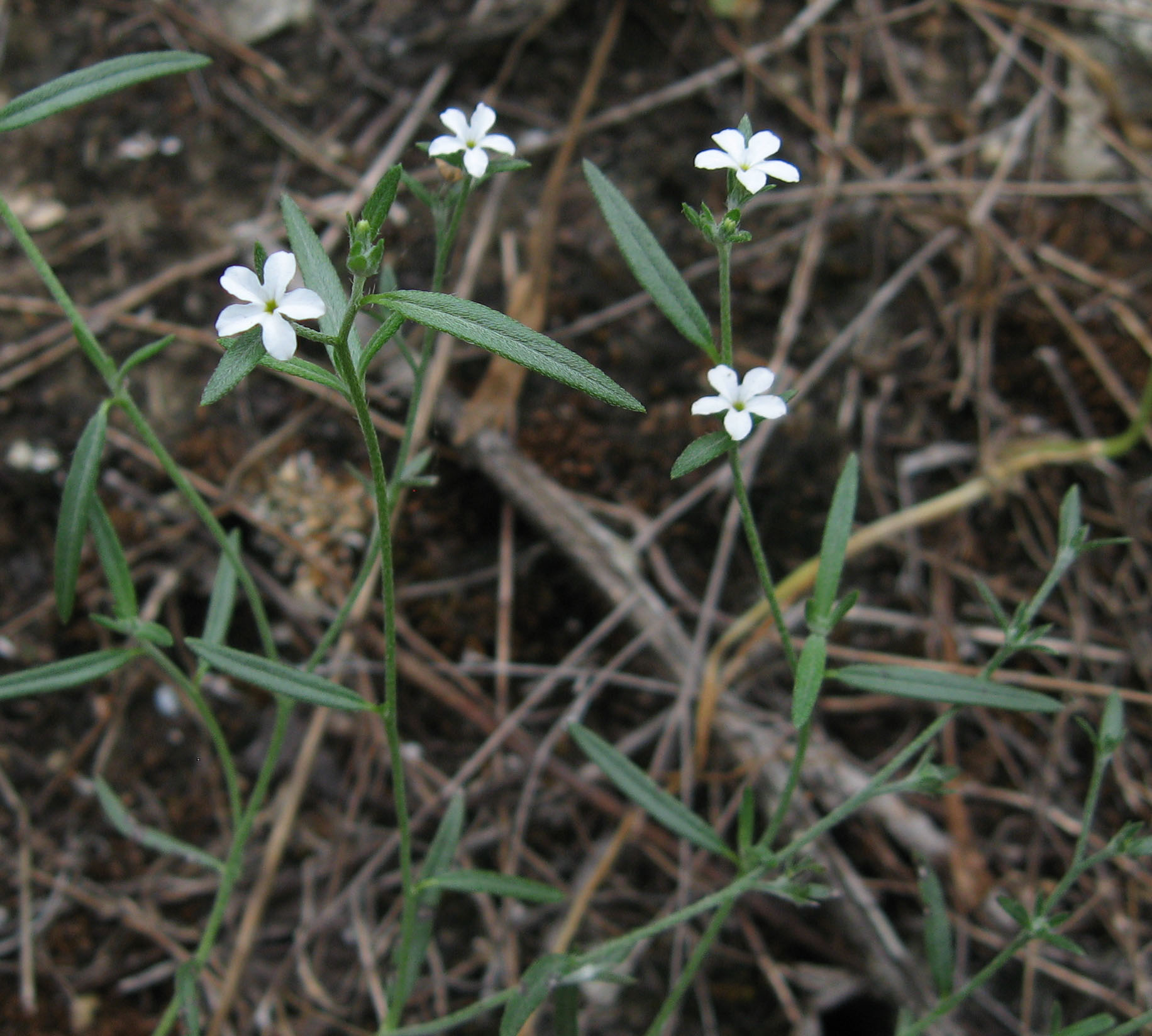

Scientific classification
- Kingdom: Plantae
- Clade: Tracheophytes
- Clade: Angiosperms
- Clade: Eudicots
- Clade: Asterids
- Order: Boraginales
- Family: Heliotropiaceae
- Genus: Heliotropium
- Species: H. tenellum

Binomial name
- Heliotropium tenellum (Nutt.) Torrey

= Heliotropium tenellum =

Species of flowering plant in the borage family

Heliotropium tenellum, the pasture heliotrope, is a species of plant in the heliotrope family. It is native to southeastern and south-central North America, where it is found in limestone glades and rocky prairies.

It is an annual species that produces white flowers in the summer.
