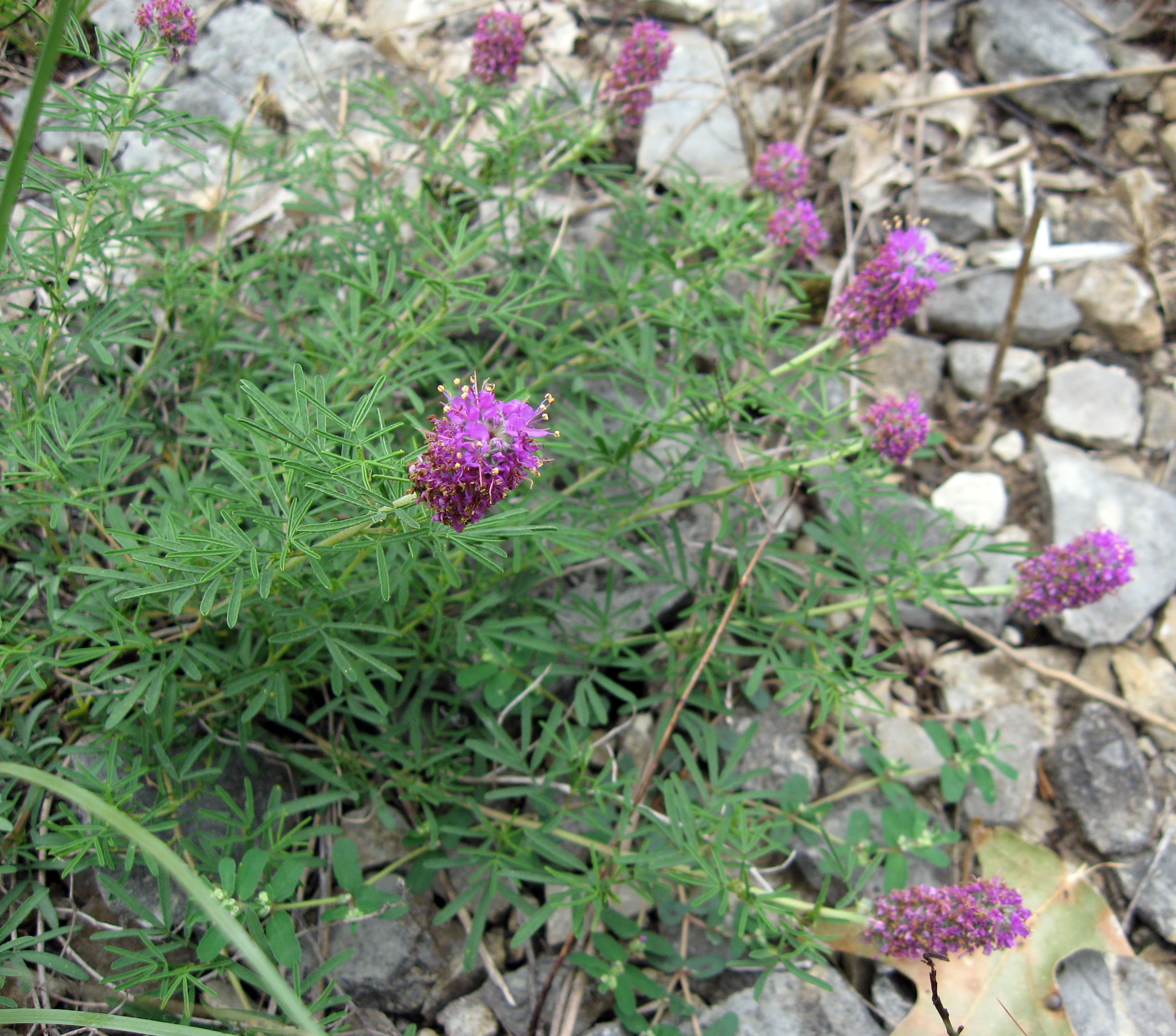

Conservation status
- Vulnerable (NatureServe)

Scientific classification
- Kingdom: Plantae
- Clade: Tracheophytes
- Clade: Angiosperms
- Clade: Eudicots
- Clade: Rosids
- Order: Fabales
- Family: Fabaceae
- Subfamily: Faboideae
- Genus: Dalea
- Species: D. gattingeri

Binomial name
- Dalea gattingeri (A.Heller) Barneby

= Dalea gattingeri =

Species of legume

Dalea gattingeri, commonly called purpletassels or Gattinger prairie clover, is a species of flowering plant in the legume family. It is native to the Southeastern United States, where it is restricted to limestone cedar glades of Tennessee, Alabama, Georgia, Missouri, and Arkansas. Its populations are widely dispersed and geographically small, with most populations being found in the Nashville Basin.

It is a perennial that produces purple flowers in the summer. It has been shown to have alleopathic chemicals that inhibit the growth of nearby species Minuartia patula.
