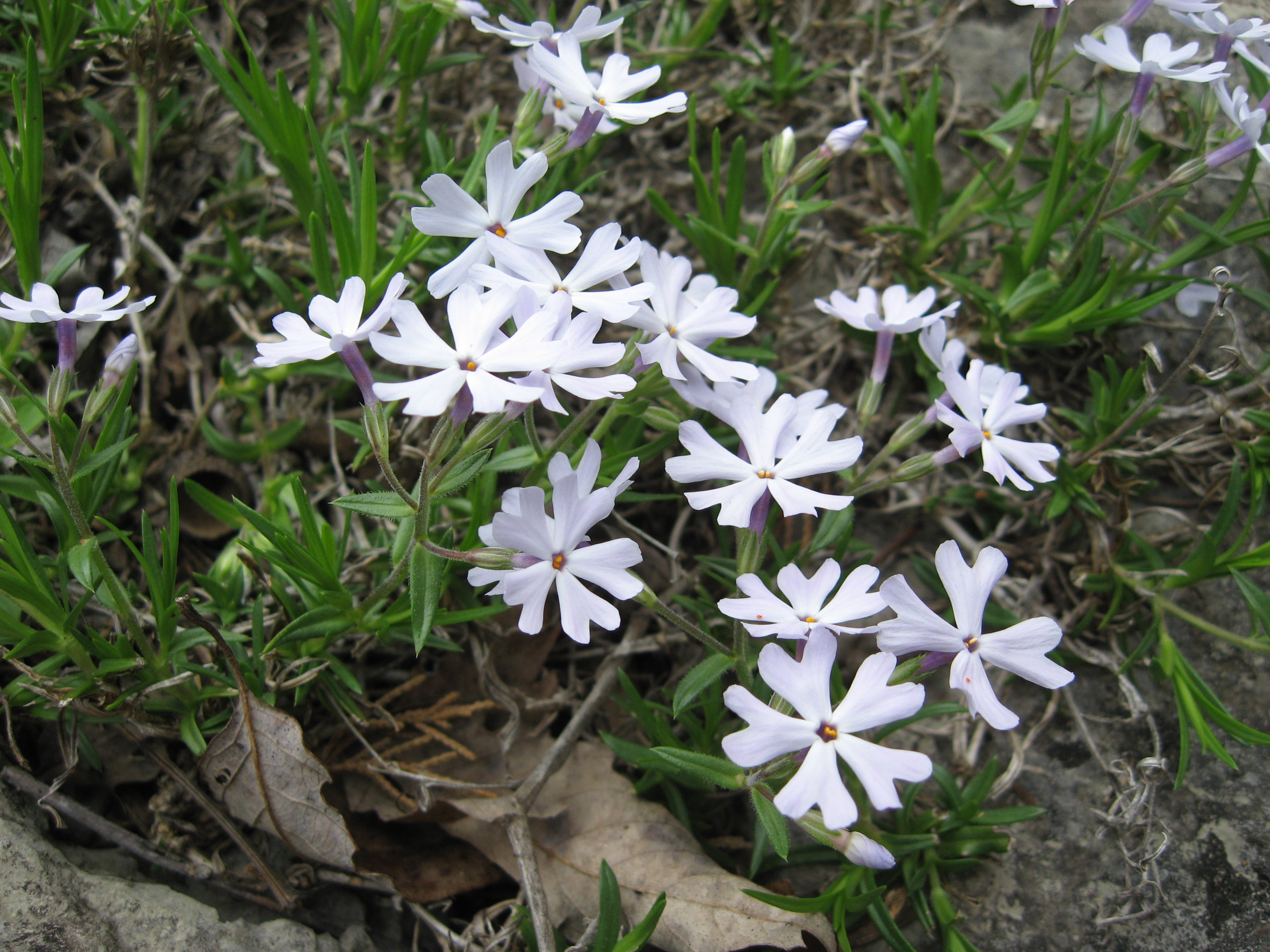

Conservation status
- Secure (NatureServe)

Scientific classification
- Kingdom: Plantae
- Clade: Tracheophytes
- Clade: Angiosperms
- Clade: Eudicots
- Clade: Asterids
- Order: Ericales
- Family: Polemoniaceae
- Genus: Phlox
- Species: P. bifida

Binomial name
- Phlox bifida Beck

= Phlox bifida =

Species of flowering plant

Phlox bifida, commonly known as cleft phlox or sand phlox, is a perennial herbaceous plant in the Polemoniaceae (phlox) family that is native to the central United States.

== Description ==
Phlox bifida is a mat-forming subshrub growing up to 15–30 centimetres (6–12 in) tall in patches of short stems. The stems occasionally branch and are covered with short hairs. Leaves along the stem are opposite, linear, and short, measuring about 5 centimetres (2 in) long. The flowers are pale purple and have 5 lobes, each with a V-shaped notch at the end.

== Taxonomy ==
Two subspecies of Phlox bifida are distinguished based on hair and flower characters. These are:

- Phlox bifida ssp. bifida - Native to sandy regions of the Midwest.
- Phlox bifida ssp. stellaria - Native to limestone glades and cliffs of Kentucky and Tennessee.

== Etymology ==
The genus name Phlox comes from the old Greek word for "flame," referencing flowers that were flame colored. The specific epithet bifada is Latin for "twice-cut", which describes the notched petals.

== Distribution and habitat ==
Phlox bifida is native to the Midwestern United States, the Ozarks, and the cedar glades of Kentucky and Tennessee. The plant can be found in dry woods, on slopes, and on bluff ledges. It typically grows in dry, rocky soils.

== Ecology ==
The flowers bloom in the early spring, and a variety of butterflies and moths feed on the nectar.
