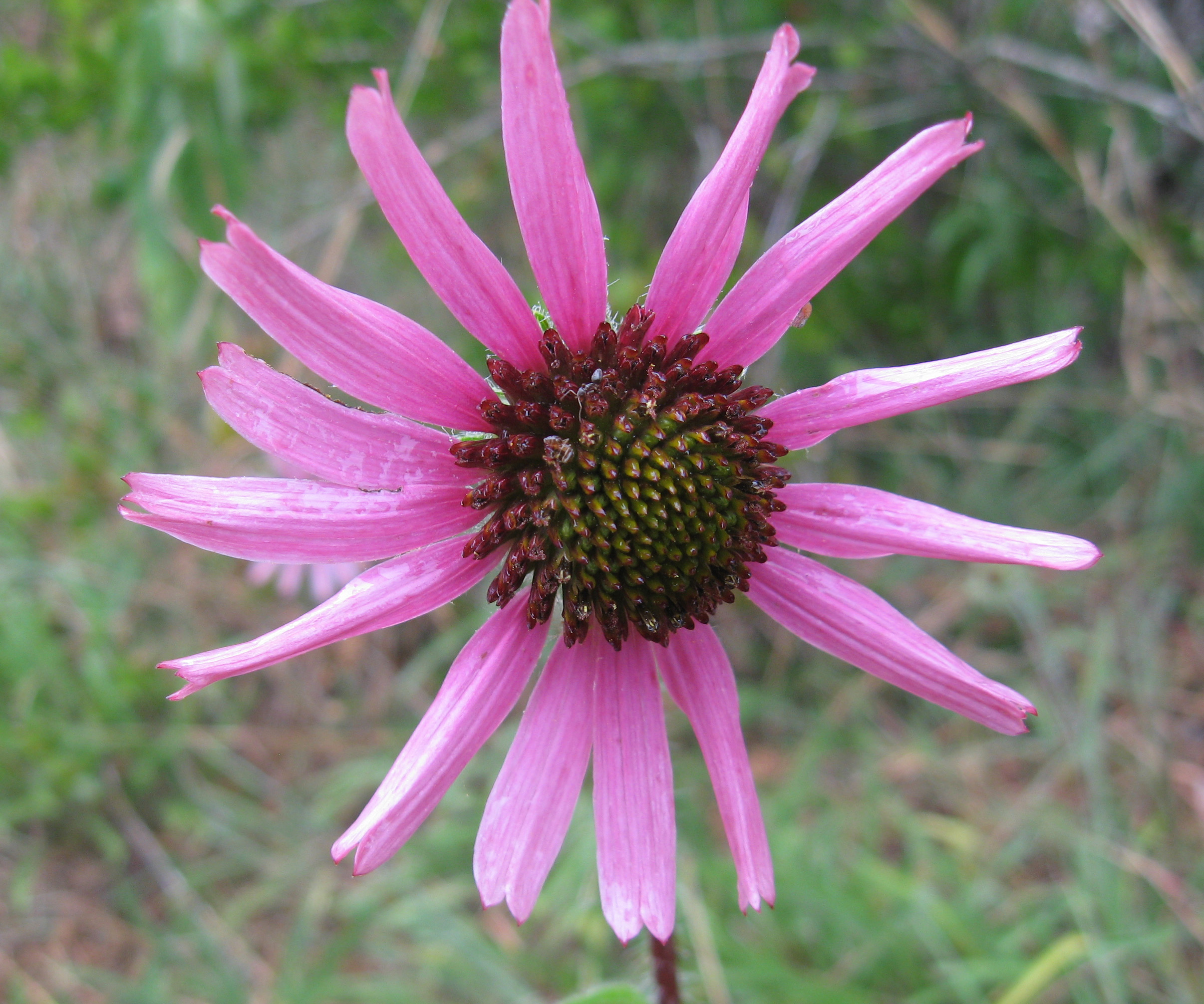

Conservation status
- Imperiled (NatureServe)

- Delisted (ESA)

Scientific classification
- Kingdom: Plantae
- Clade: Tracheophytes
- Clade: Angiosperms
- Clade: Eudicots
- Clade: Asterids
- Order: Asterales
- Family: Asteraceae
- Tribe: Heliantheae
- Genus: Echinacea
- Species: E. tennesseensis

Binomial name
- Echinacea tennesseensis (Beadle) Small

Synonyms
- Brauneria tennesseensis Beadle 1898; Echinacea angustifolia var. tennesseensis (Beadle) S.F.Blake; Echinacea pallida var. tennesseensis (Beadle) Binns, B.R.Baum & Arnason

= Echinacea tennesseensis =

Species of flowering plant

Echinacea tennesseensis, also known as the Tennessee coneflower or Tennessee purple coneflower, is a flowering plant in the family Asteraceae, endemic to the cedar glades of the central portion of the U.S. state of Tennessee.

== Description ==
Echinacea tennesseensis is a herbaceous perennial plant growing to 75 centimetres (2.46 ft) tall. The leaves are hairy, lanceolate, and arranged in a basal whorl with only a few small leaves on the flower stems.

The flowers are produced in a capitulum (flowerhead) up to 8 cm (3.2 inches) broad, with a ring of purple ray florets surrounding the brown disc florets.

A noticeable characteristic is its generally erect ray flowers, in contrast to the more drooping rays of its most similar congener, E. angustifolia (widespread throughout the prairie of the central U.S.) and other common Echinacea species such as E. purpurea.

== Distribution ==
Echinacea tennesseensis is a rare species, found in fewer than 10 locations in Davidson, Wilson, and Rutherford Counties.

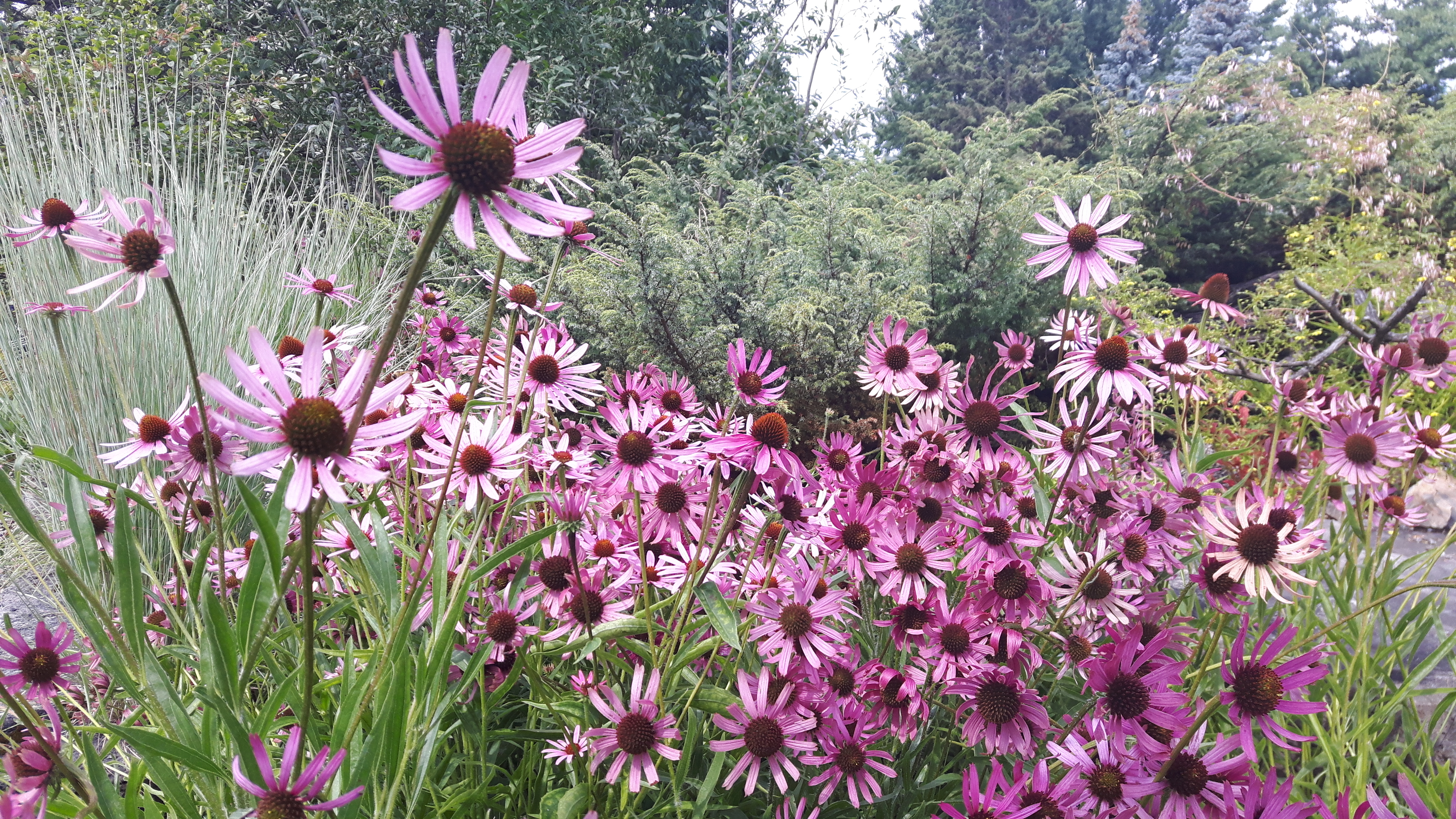
Flowering plants in cultivation

It has been hypothesized that an ancestral Echinacea species spread into middle Tennessee during the hypsithermal period following the last ice age, when conditions were drier and prairies extended into much of the central eastern U.S. that is now forested. As conditions became wetter, the Echinacea populations became isolated on the prairie-like habitat of the cedar glades which were eventually surrounded by forest. This isolation resulted in divergence and speciation of E. tennesseensis.

== Conservation status ==
The Tennessee coneflower was once a federally listed endangered plant species and its recovery has been aided by the purchase of habitat by the Nature Conservancy and the State of Tennessee. The United States Fish and Wildlife Service proposed that this plant be removed from the endangered species list because all the former threats to the species are eliminated or reduced. The Tennessee coneflower was delisted effective September 2, 2011.
