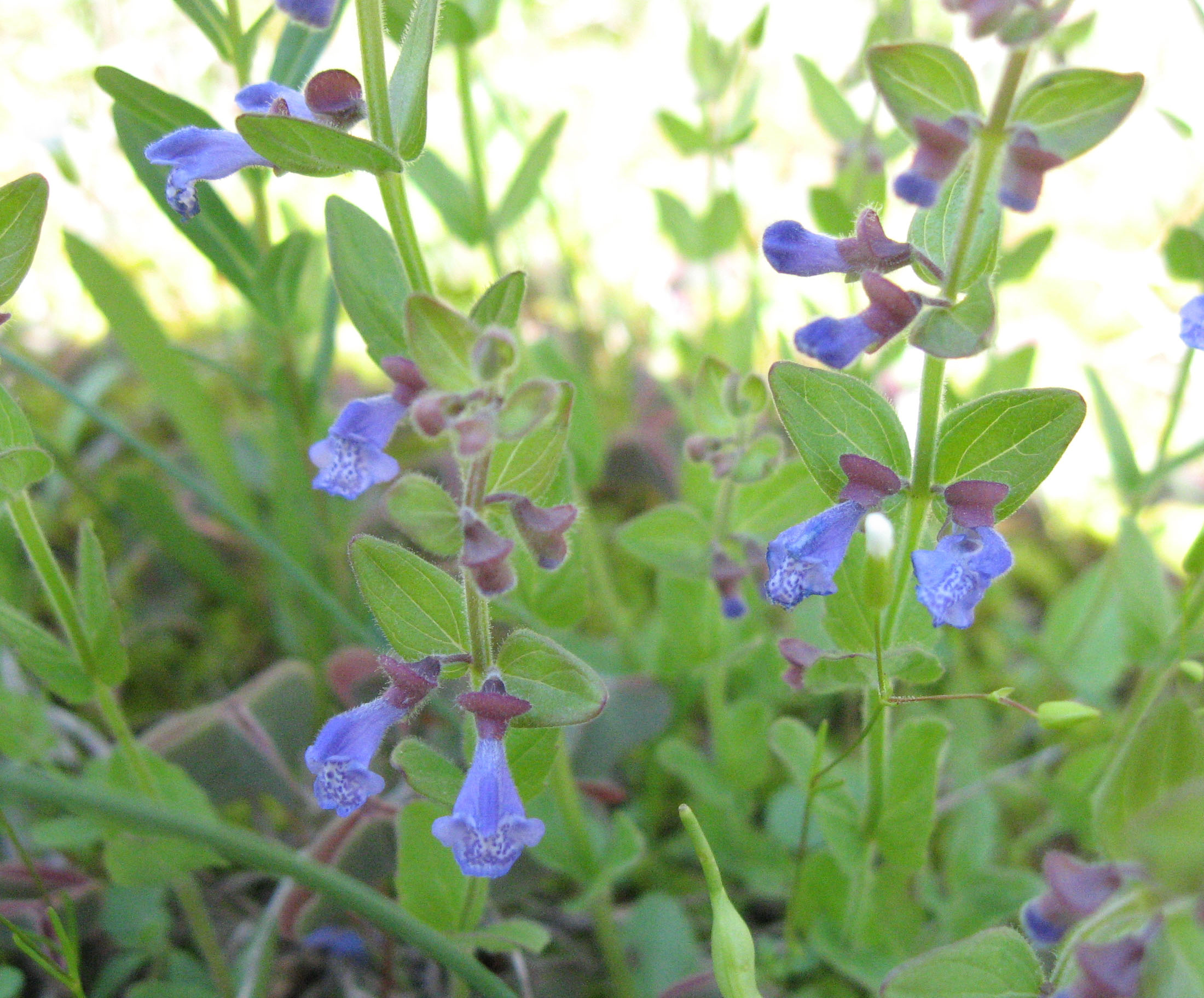

Scientific classification
- Kingdom: Plantae
- Clade: Tracheophytes
- Clade: Angiosperms
- Clade: Eudicots
- Clade: Asterids
- Order: Lamiales
- Family: Lamiaceae
- Genus: Scutellaria
- Species: S. parvula

Binomial name
- Scutellaria parvula Michx.

= Scutellaria parvula =

Species of flowering plant

Scutellaria parvula, commonly known as the small skullcap, is a member of the mint family. It is native to eastern and central North America, being most common in the central states and become rare in the east. It is found in areas that provide ample sunlight, such as prairies, glades, and savannas, often in calcareous soil. Flowering time is from late spring to early summer.

The closely related Scutellaria australis is sometimes considered a variety of this species.
