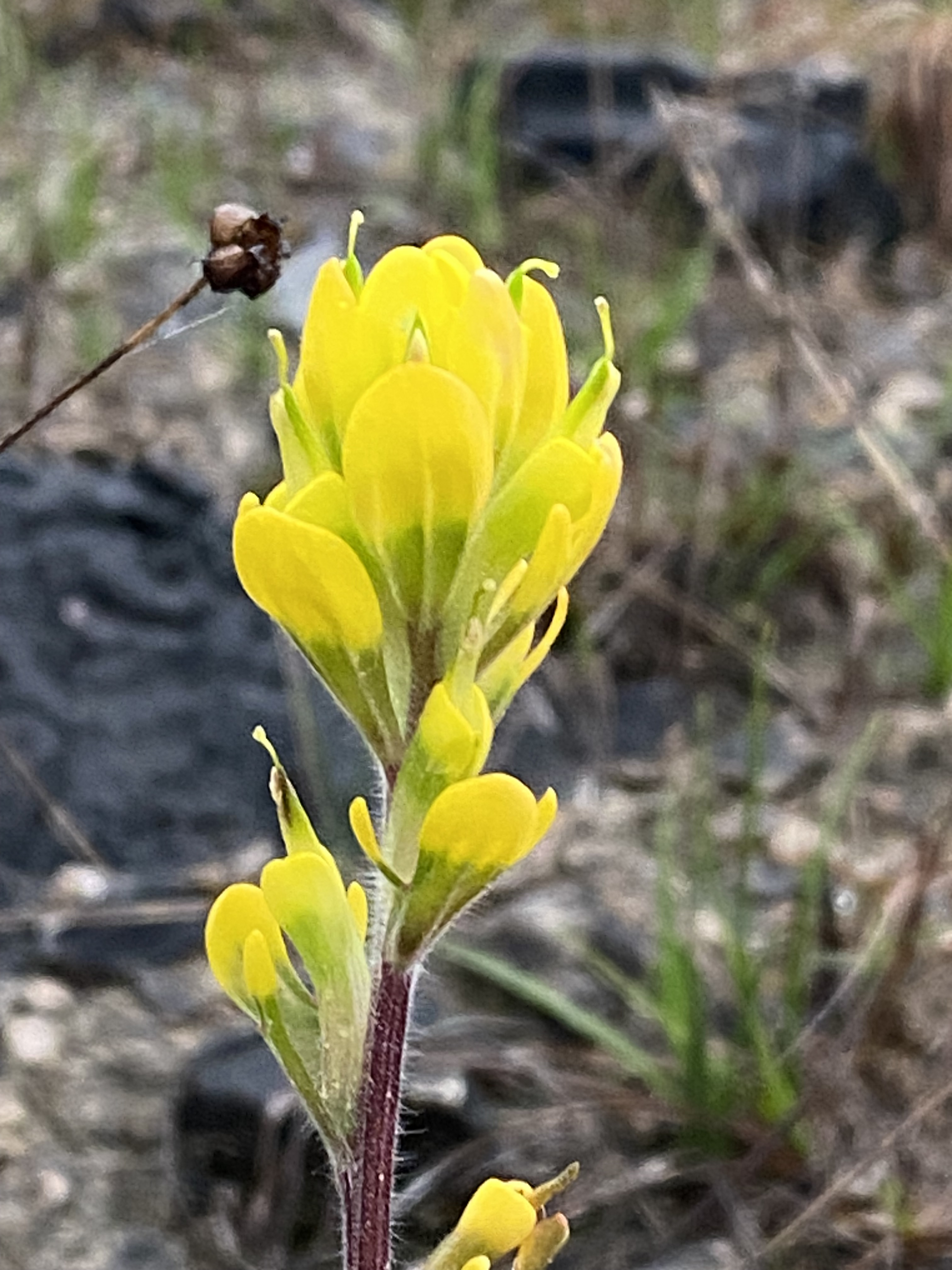
- Castilleja kraliana in flower

Conservation status
- Imperiled (NatureServe)

Scientific classification
- Kingdom: Plantae
- Clade: Tracheophytes
- Clade: Angiosperms
- Clade: Eudicots
- Clade: Asterids
- Order: Lamiales
- Family: Orobanchaceae
- Genus: Castilleja
- Species: C. kraliana

Binomial name
- Castilleja kraliana J.R.Allison

= Castilleja kraliana =

Species of plant

Castilleja kraliana, is a species of flowering plant in the family Orobanchaceae known by the common names Cahaba paintbrush or Cahaba Indian paintbrush.

== Description ==
This species has a fibrous root system along an erect, green stem that is pubescent and contains short-stalked glands. The stems are also solitary and may be branched from the mid-stem. Basal leaves are often purple in color, oblanceolate, and unlobed with flat margins. Cauline leaves range from linear to linear-lanceolate with 3-5 lobes. Flowers are attached at the base by a large, green bract. They are bright yellow towards the apex. Each flower contains four sepals that form a yellow tube at the tip and white or light green at the base. The corolla contains five yellow-green petals which form a tube. The fruit is a capsule containing many small seeds.

== Habitat ==
It is endemic to Ketona Dolomite outcrops in Bibb County, Alabama.
