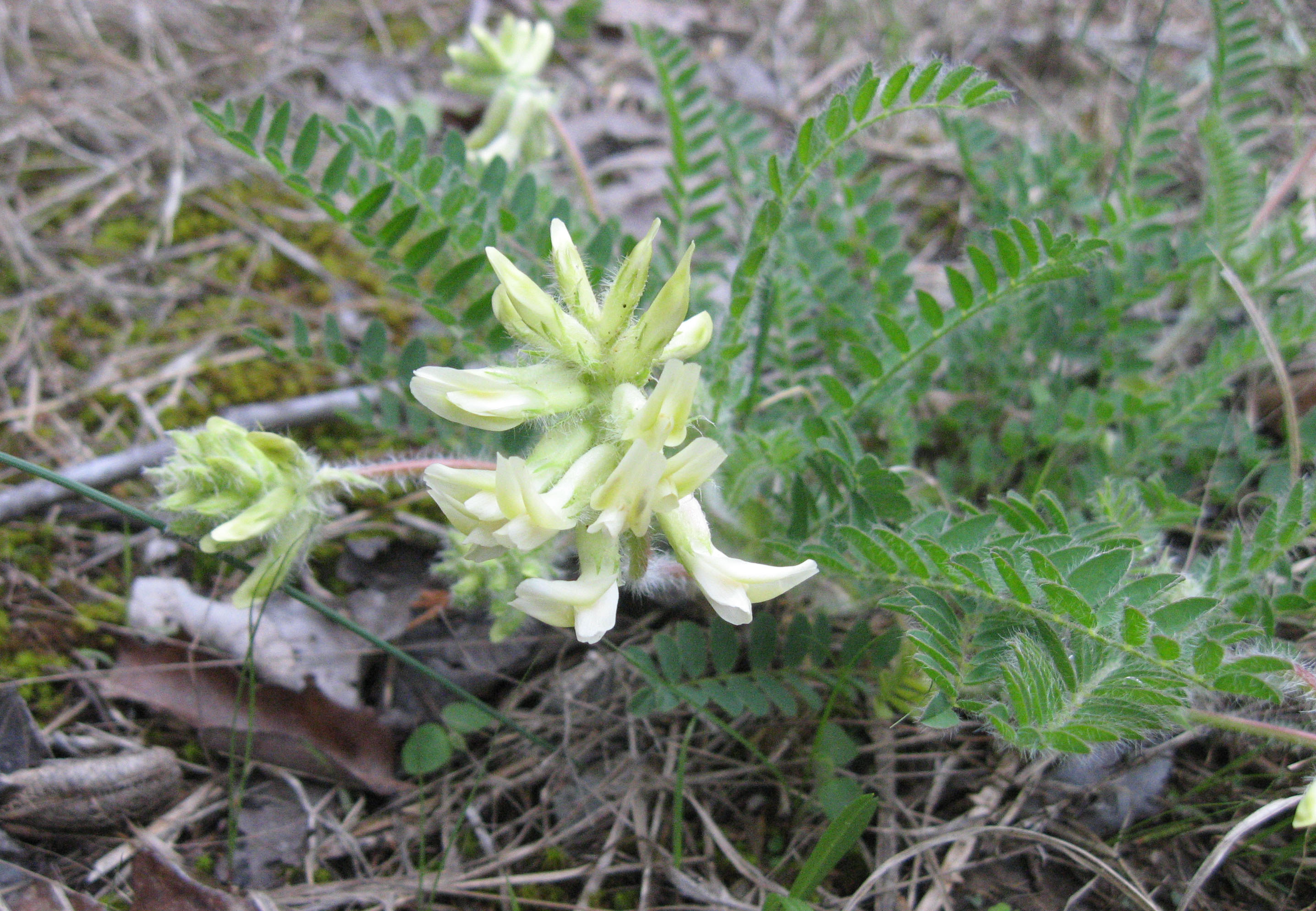

Conservation status
- Imperiled (NatureServe)

Scientific classification
- Kingdom: Plantae
- Clade: Embryophytes
- Clade: Tracheophytes
- Clade: Angiosperms
- Clade: Eudicots
- Clade: Rosids
- Order: Fabales
- Family: Fabaceae
- Subfamily: Faboideae
- Genus: Astragalus
- Species: A. tennesseensis

Binomial name
- Astragalus tennesseensis A.Gray ex. Chapm.

= Astragalus tennesseensis =

Species of legume

Astragalus tennesseensis is a species of flowering plant in the legume family known by the common name Tennessee milkvetch. It is native to the United States, where it is known from Illinois, Indiana, Tennessee and Alabama. Most of the occurrences are in Tennessee.

This plant produces cream-colored flowers in April and May. The seedlings grow slowly and several years pass before the plants reach reproductive maturity. The species is adapted to drought, remaining metabolically active in habitat that is dry over the summer.

This plant has been nearly extirpated from Illinois and Indiana, but it has been reintroduced there in a few select populations. Some natural populations have been rediscovered in Illinois.

The plant grows in cedar glades and glade ecotones and open prairies. It may be found in the partial shade of Juniperus virginiana, but it does not tolerate heavy shade.

This species is unique within genus Astragalus and it is the only species in section Tennesseensis.
