= Glade (geography) =

Open area within a woodland

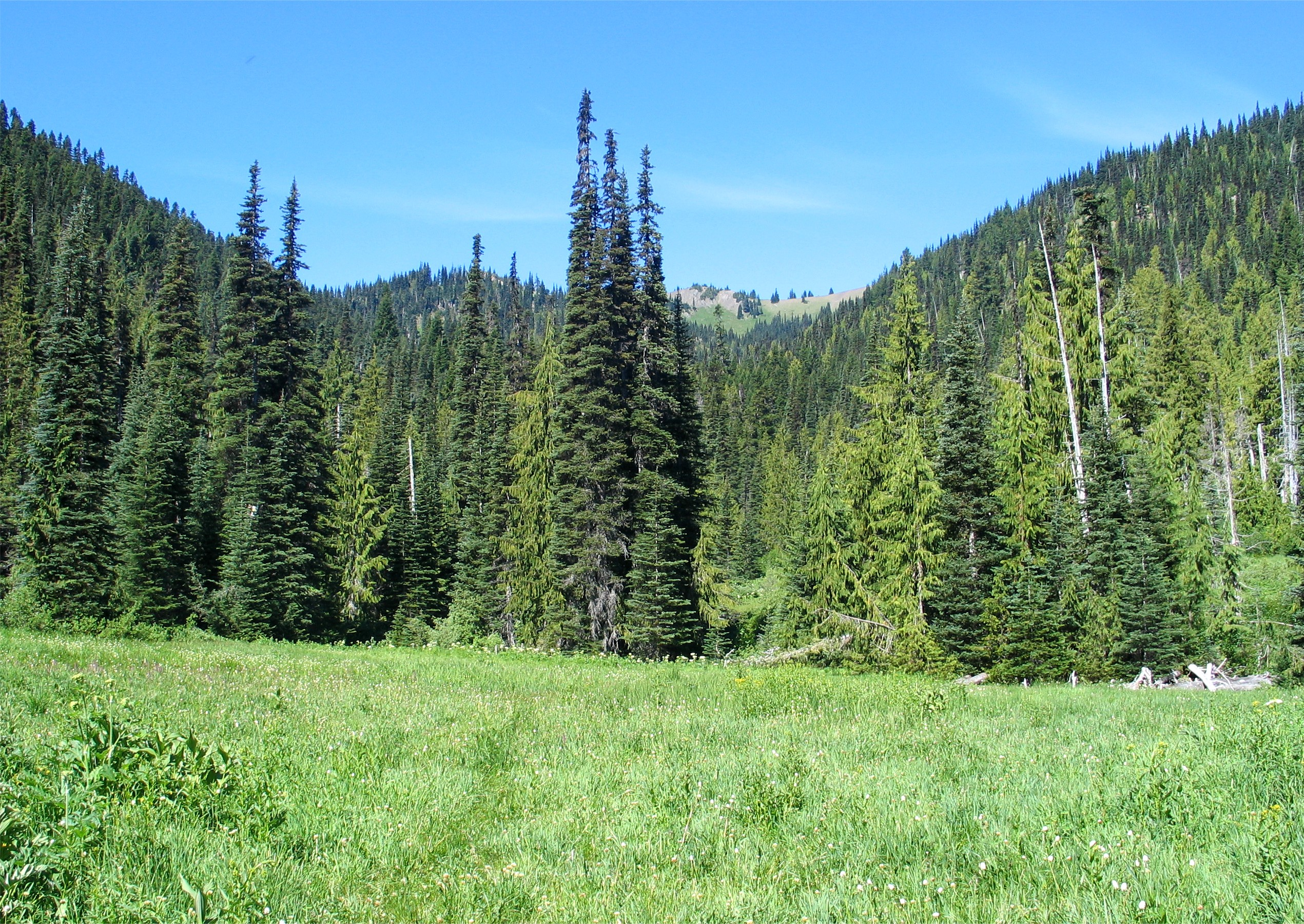
A glade in a montane forest in the Olympic Mountains

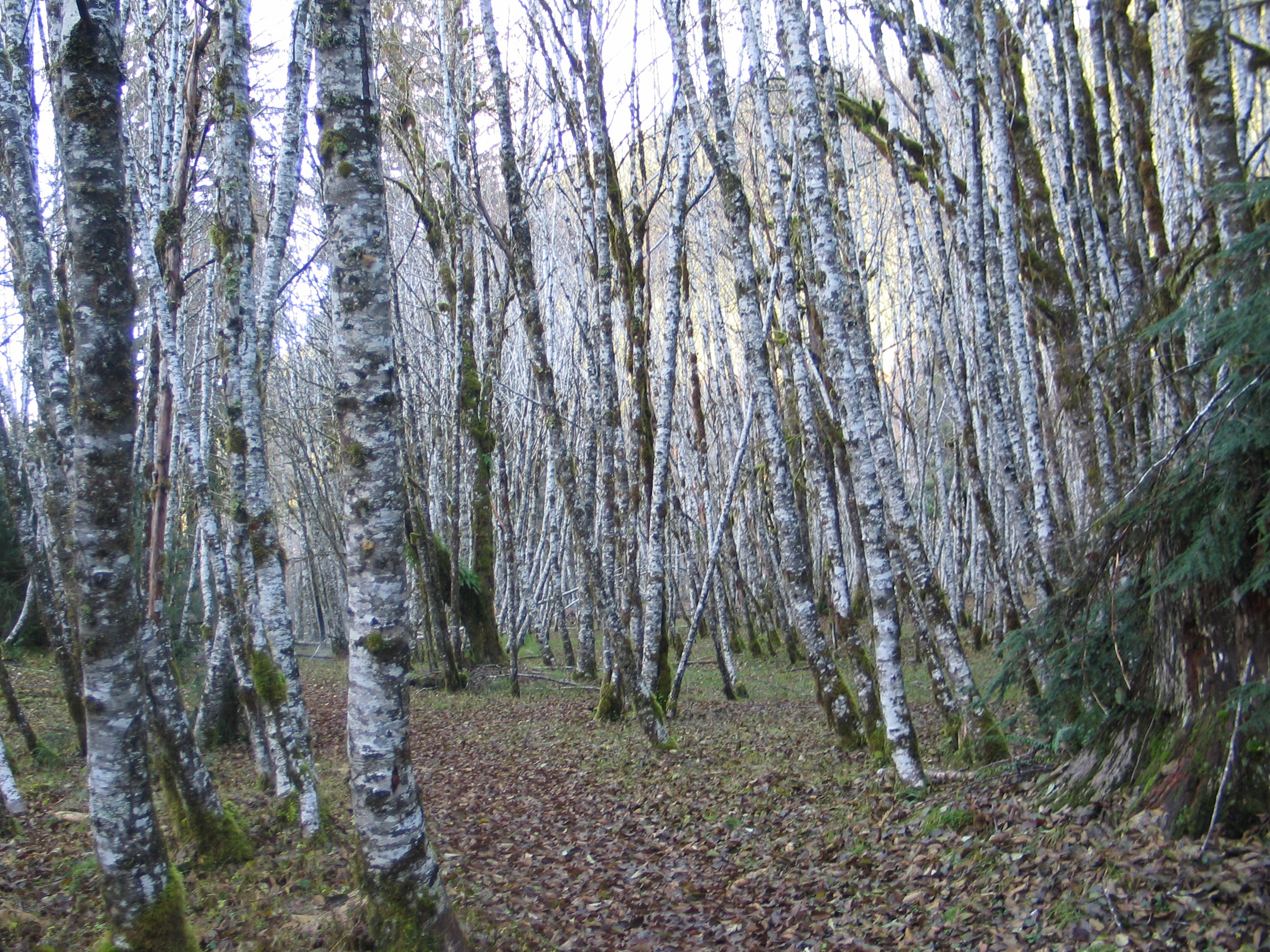
An alder glade along the Elwha River

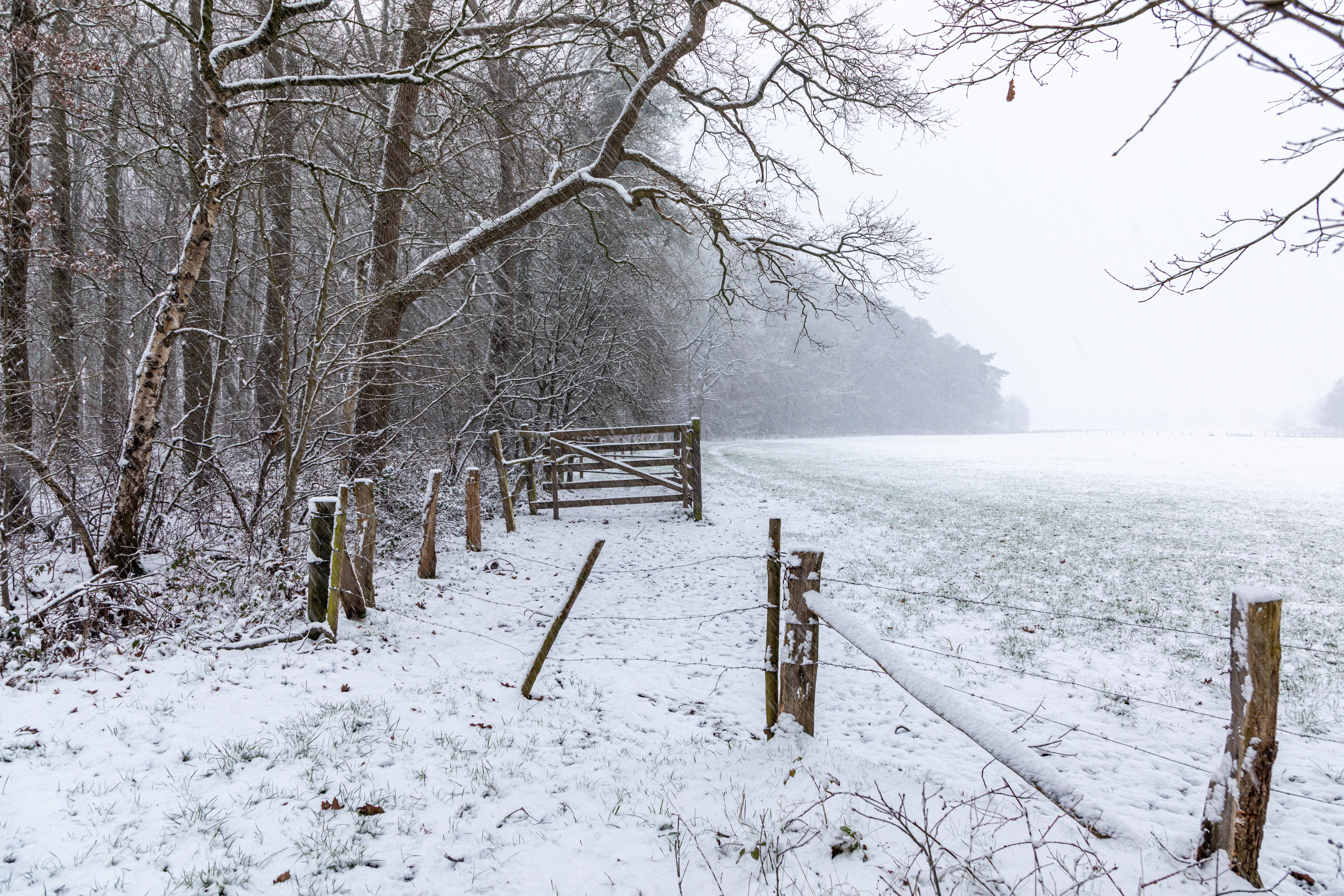
Artificial clearing in Börnste hamlet, Kirchspiel, Dülmen, North Rhine-Westphalia, Germany

In the most general sense, a glade or clearing is an open area within a forest. Glades are often grassy meadows under the canopy of deciduous trees such as red alder or quaking aspen in western North America. They also represent openings in forests where local conditions such as avalanches, poor soils, or fire damage have created semipermanent clearings. They are very important to herbivorous animals, such as deer and elk, for forage and denning activities.

Sometimes the word is used in a looser sense, as in the treeless wetlands of the Everglades of Florida. In the central United States, calcareous glades occur with rocky, prairie-like habitats in areas of shallow soil.

Glades are characterized by unique plant and animal communities that are adapted to harsh and dry conditions.

== See also ==
- Treefall gap
