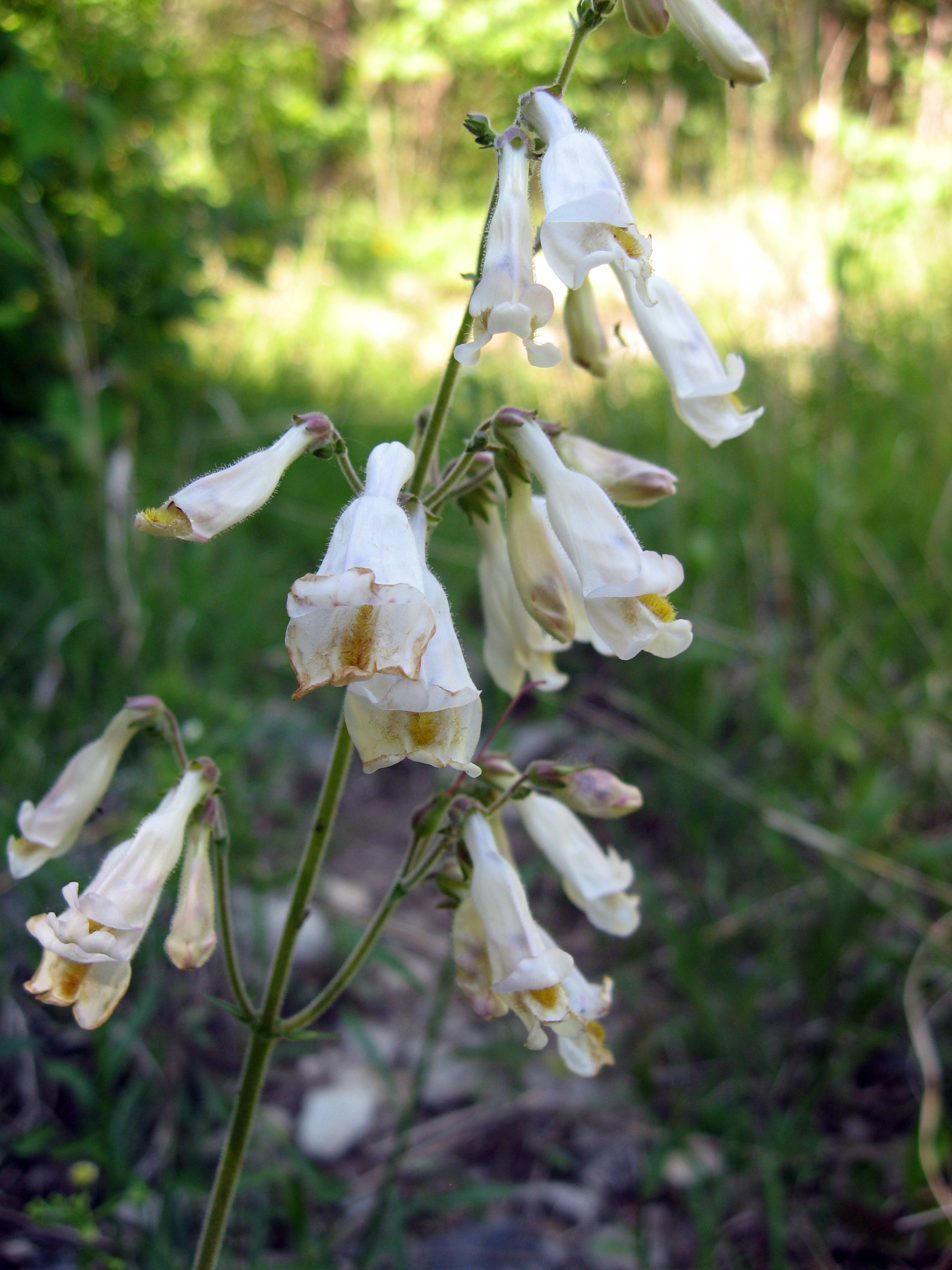

Conservation status
- Apparently Secure (NatureServe)

Scientific classification
- Kingdom: Plantae
- Clade: Embryophytes
- Clade: Tracheophytes
- Clade: Spermatophytes
- Clade: Angiosperms
- Clade: Eudicots
- Clade: Asterids
- Order: Lamiales
- Family: Plantaginaceae
- Genus: Penstemon
- Species: P. tenuiflorus

Binomial name
- Penstemon tenuiflorus Pennell

= Penstemon tenuiflorus =

Species of flowering plant

Penstemon tenuiflorus, commonly known as eastern whiteflower beardtongue, is a species of flowering plant in the plantain family. It is native only to a small area of the Southeastern United States, in the southern Interior Low Plateau and Black Belt of Alabama and Mississippi. Its preferred habitat is limestone glades and woodlands.
