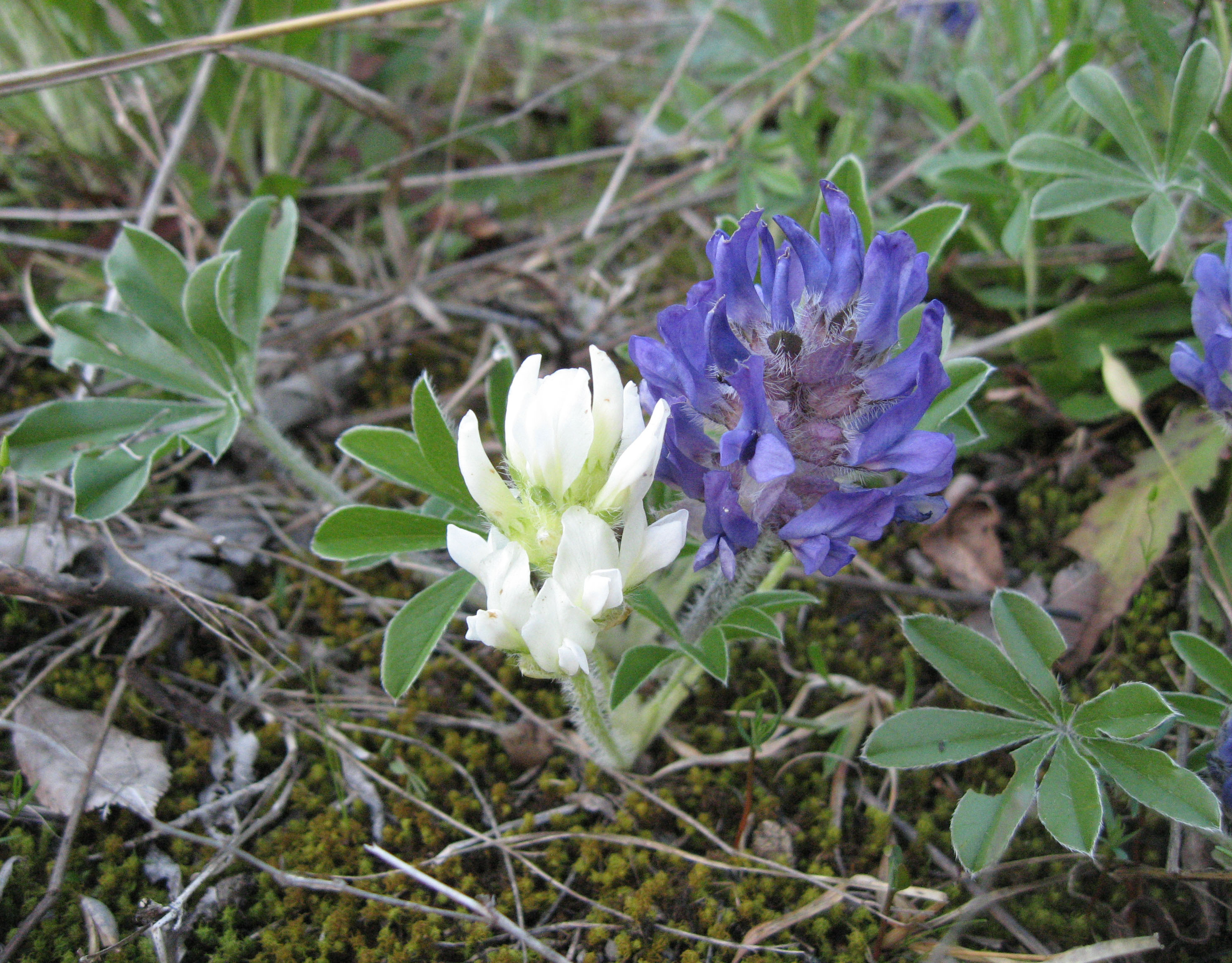

Conservation status
- Apparently Secure (NatureServe)

Scientific classification
- Kingdom: Plantae
- Clade: Tracheophytes
- Clade: Angiosperms
- Clade: Eudicots
- Clade: Rosids
- Order: Fabales
- Family: Fabaceae
- Subfamily: Faboideae
- Genus: Pediomelum
- Species: P. subacaule

Binomial name
- Pediomelum subacaule (Torr. & A.Gray) Rydb.

= Pediomelum subacaule =

Species of legume

Pediomelum subacaule is a species of flowering plant in the legume family known by the common names Nashville breadroot and whiterim scurfpea. It is native to a small area of Eastern North America, only being found in limestone cedar glades of the Interior Low Plateau and Ridge and Valley ecoregions of Alabama, Georgia, and Tennessee.

This species is a geophyte, and is well adapted to the desert-like conditions of flat limestone glades. The plants flower in April and set seed in May, then quickly die back in summer, beginning new growth when the cool temperatures of fall set in. This life cycle is in harmony with the availability of water in the harsh cedar glade environment, which is often saturated with water in the winter and spring but extremely hot and dry during the summer.
