= Nashville Basin =

Area surrounding Murfreesboro, Tennessee

Coordinates: 36°00′N 86°48′W

Nashville Basin in Tennessee

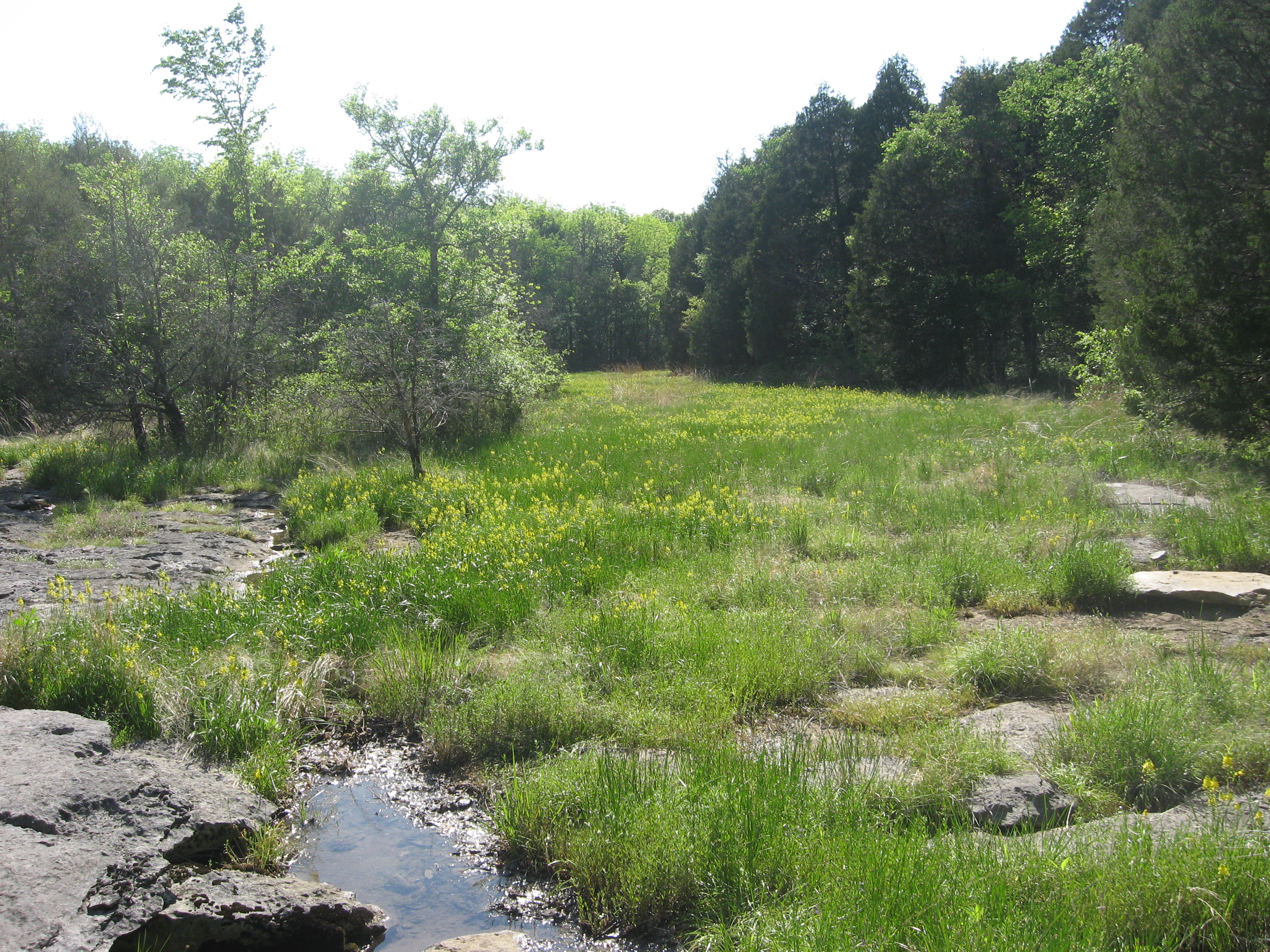
Nashville Basin fen

The Nashville Basin, also known as the Central Basin, is a term often used to describe the area surrounding Murfreesboro, Tennessee, in which Nashville is located. The Central Basin was caused by an uplifting which produced a dome known as the Nashville Dome. The Nashville Dome is evidenced by the underlying rock strata that all dip downward away from Nashville. The uplifting of the Nashville Dome fractured overlying strata, making it more easily eroded, and thus the "dome" resulted in a "basin". Uplifted strata in the center of a geological dome have higher potential erosive energy than the surrounding strata, because they are physically higher. Erosion thus acts on the uplifted area at a greater rate than on the surrounding flat-lying area, creating a low area, i.e., a basin. This area is more correctly referred to as the "Central Dome" of Tennessee.

Nashville is located in the northwestern portion of the Central Basin. The basin extends for approximately forty-five to sixty miles to the east of Nashville and about eighty miles to the south, near the Tennessee–Alabama state line. Travelers leaving Nashville in a northerly or easterly direction will soon begin the climb up the escarpment that marks the bordering geographic/geologic province, the Highland Rim and further eastwards, the Cumberland Plateau. The southern edge of the Highland Rim is more distant and somewhat less pronounced. The only downhill routes leaving the area follow the course of the Cumberland River as it flows northwest toward Ashland City and Clarksville, Tennessee.

The Central Basin is underlain primarily by limestone from the Ordovician Period. The Nashville Basin and a similar but smaller area surrounding Lexington, Kentucky, referred to as the "Kentucky Bluegrass" area, are the two primary areas of this sort in the world.

The Inner Basin of the flattest terrain and most limestone-derived soil chemistry is located to the south and east of Nashville, primarily in the counties of Marshall, Rutherford, Wilson, and Bedford. Here also are seen the horse farms somewhat reminiscent of the Kentucky Bluegrass region. Supposedly the underlying rock weathers to a soil particularly suited to the growing of the sorts of grasses most favored by horses. Limestone glades (or cedar glades), located to the east of Nashville, primarily in Wilson and Rutherford Counties, are open areas where the flat limestone rock is denuded of overlying soil or nearly so, provide an environment for flora unlike any other in the world.
