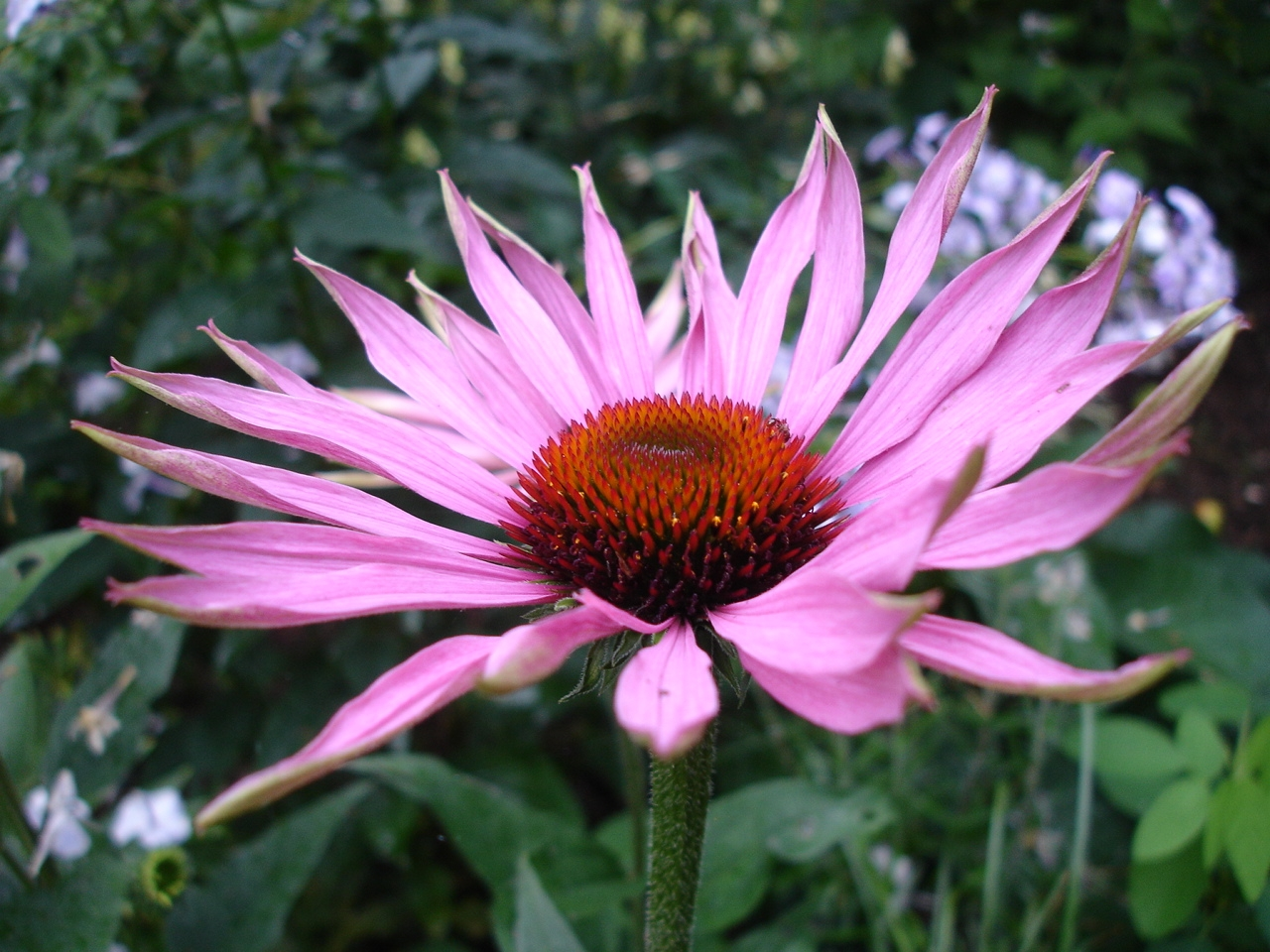
- Echinacea purpurea 'Maxima'

Scientific classification
- Kingdom: Plantae
- Clade: Tracheophytes
- Clade: Angiosperms
- Clade: Eudicots
- Clade: Asterids
- Order: Asterales
- Family: Asteraceae
- Subfamily: Asteroideae
- Tribe: Heliantheae
- Subtribe: Zinniinae
- Genus: Echinacea; Moench, 1794

Synonyms
- Brauneria Necker ex T.C.Porter & Britton; Helichroa Raf.

= Echinacea =

Genus of flowering plants in the daisy family

Echinacea /ˌɛkɪˈneɪsiə, ˌɛkɪˈneɪʃiə/ [ek-in-NAY-shee-a] is a genus of herbaceous flowering plants in the daisy family. It has ten species, which are commonly called coneflowers. They are native only in eastern and central North America, where they grow in wet to dry prairies and open wooded areas. They have large, showy heads of composite flowers, blooming in summer. The generic name is derived from the Greek word ἐχῖνος (ekhinos), meaning "hedgehog", due to the spiny central disk. These flowering plants and their parts have different uses. Some species are cultivated in gardens for their showy flowers. Two of the species, E. tennesseensis and E. laevigata, were formerly listed in the United States as endangered species; E. tennesseensis has been delisted due to recovery and E. laevigata is now listed as threatened.

Echinacea has a long history of use in traditional medicine by Indigenous peoples for treating infections, pain, and wounds, and it later gained popularity in Western herbal remedies, especially for colds. However, modern research shows weak or inconclusive evidence for its effectiveness, with concerns about product variability and potential side effects. Regulatory authorities have not approved Echinacea products for any medical use.

== Description ==
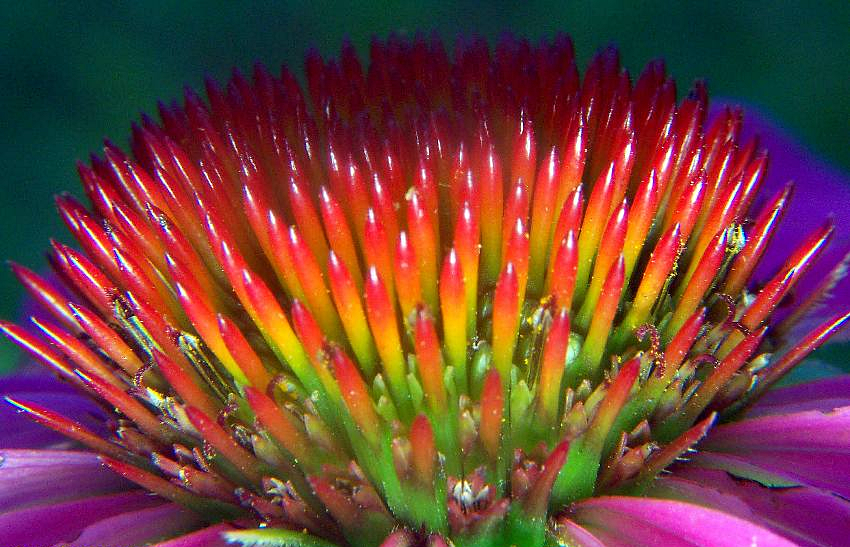
The spiny center of the head showing the paleae, from which the name derives

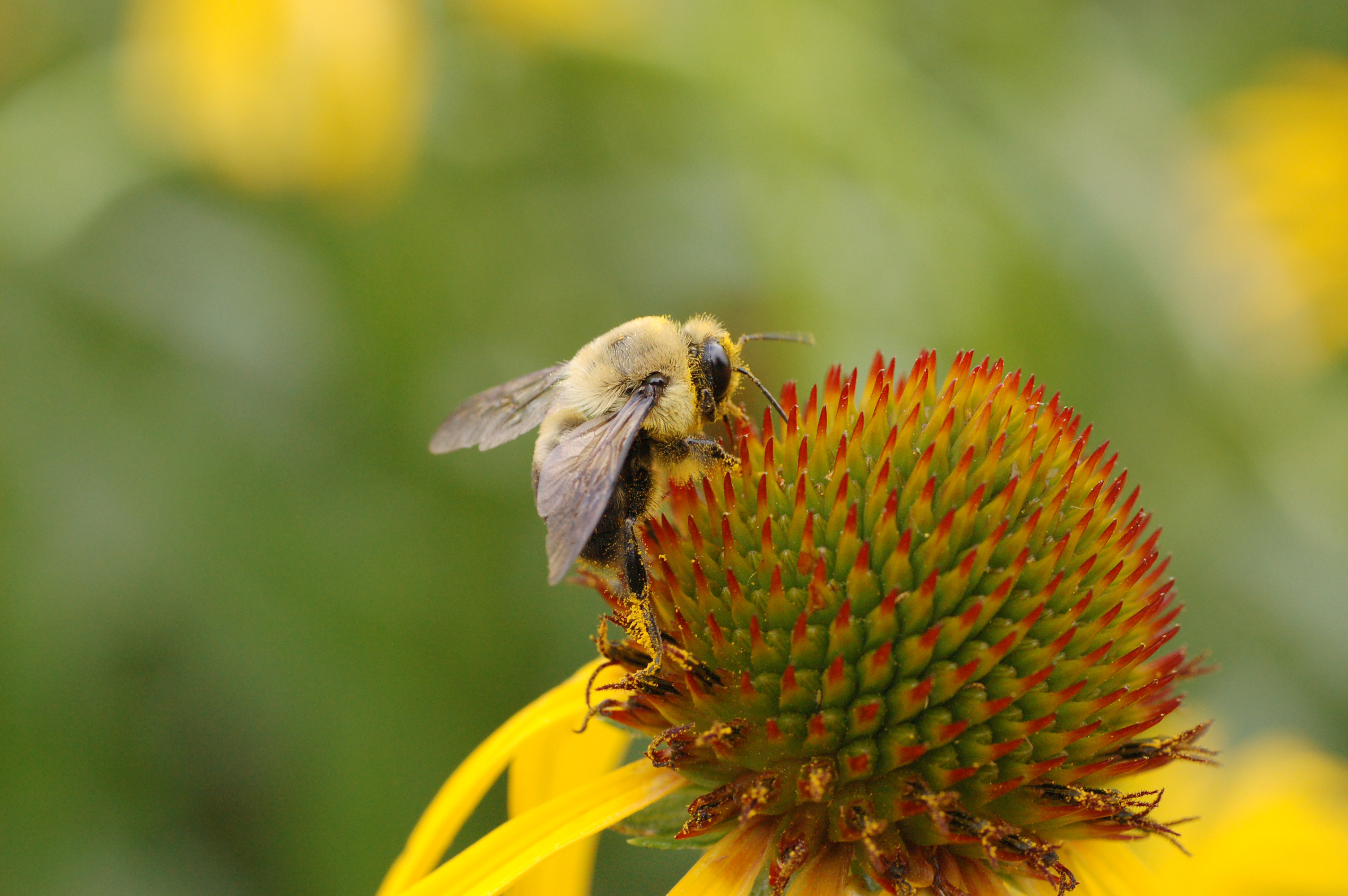
A bee on an Echinacea paradoxa head (inflorescence)

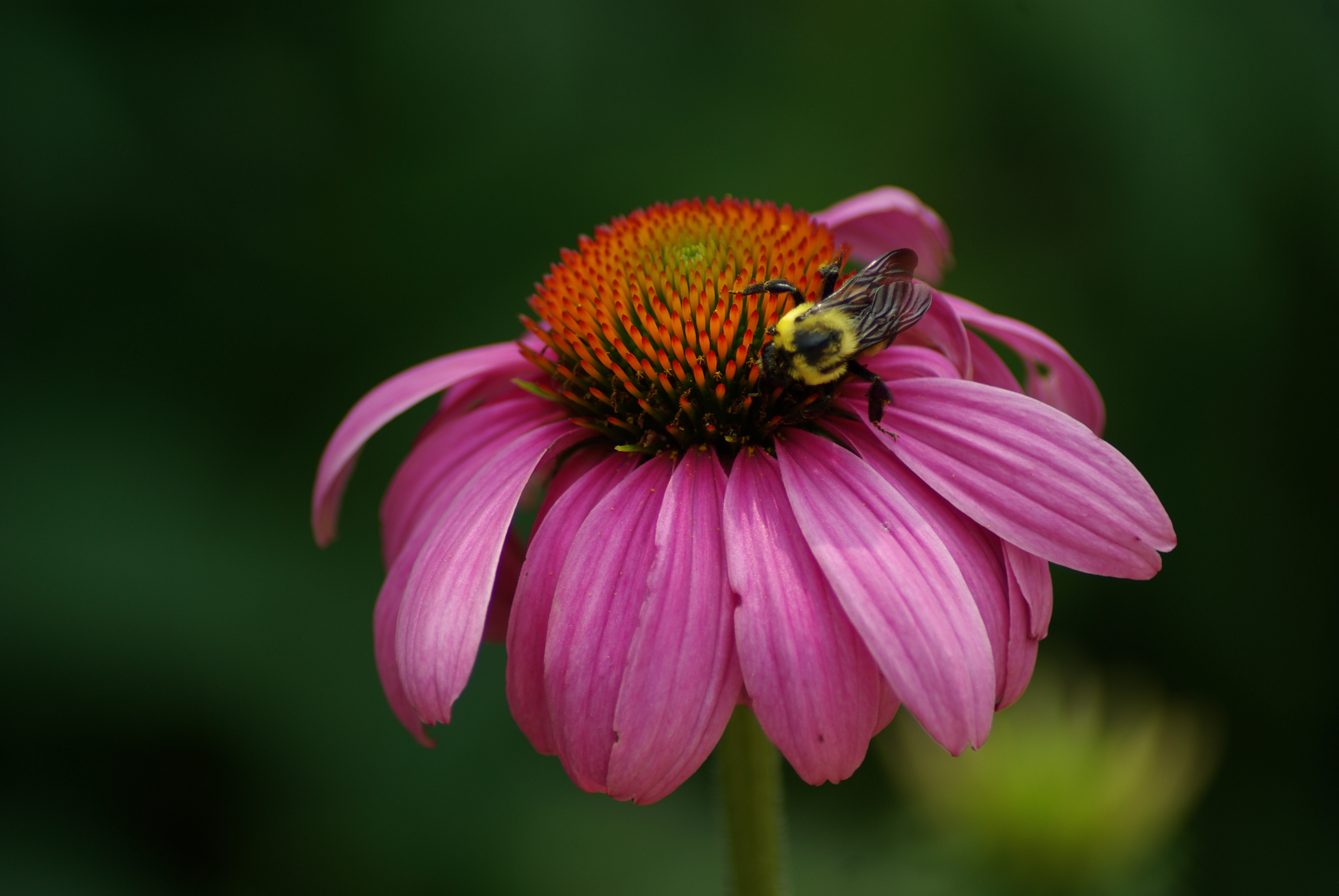
A bee on an Echinacea purpurea head

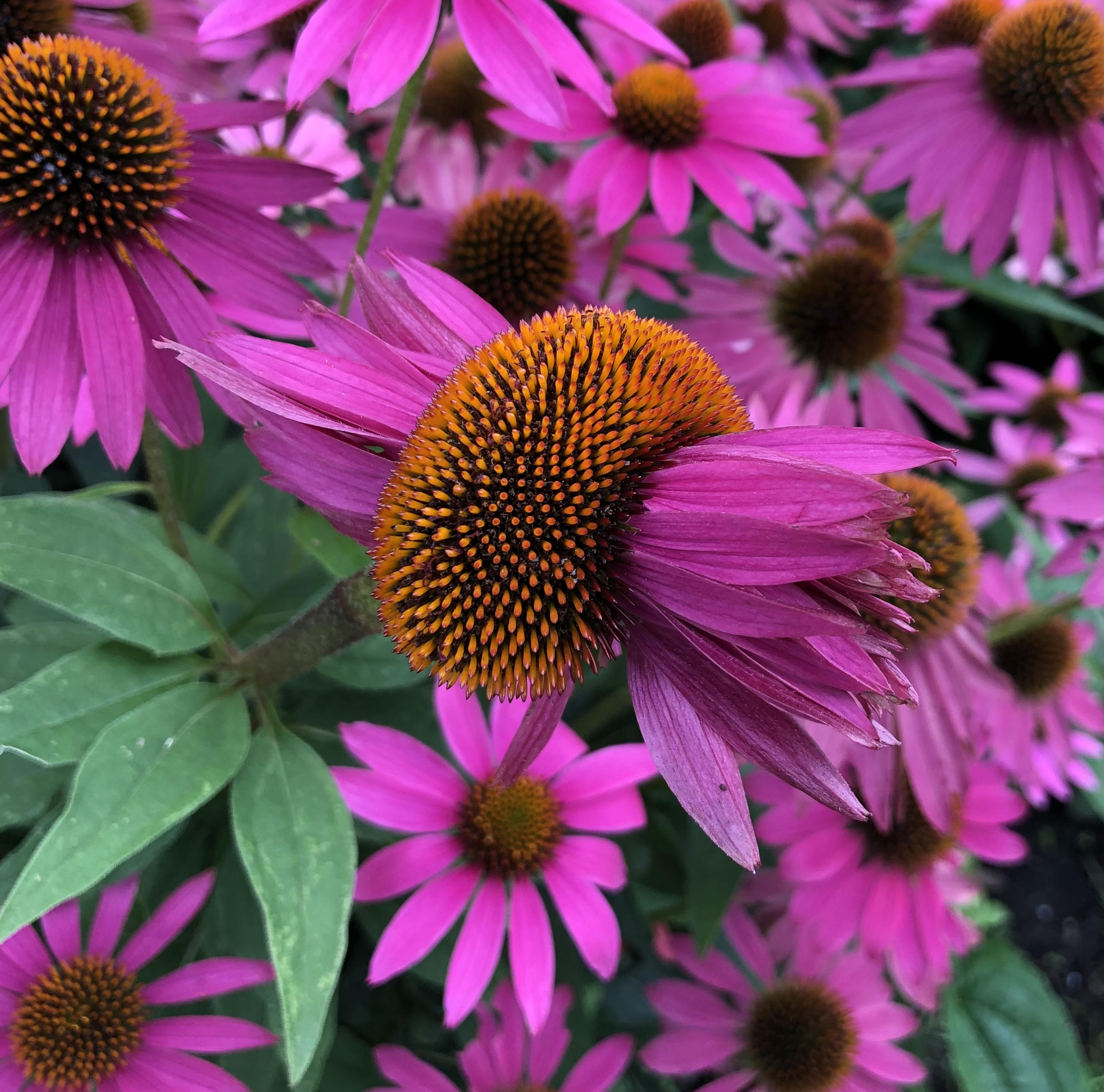
Fasciation on an Echinacea purpurea

Echinacea species are herbaceous, drought-tolerant perennial plants growing up to 140 cm (4 ft 7 in) in height. They grow from taproots, except E. purpurea, which grows from a short caudex with fibrous roots. They have erect stems that in most species are unbranched. Both the basal and cauline (stem) leaves are arranged alternately. The leaves are normally hairy with a rough texture, having uniseriate trichomes (1–4 rings of cells), but sometimes they lack hairs. The basal leaves and the lower stem leaves have petioles, and as the leaves progress up the stem the petioles often decrease in length. The leaf blades in different species may have one, three, or five nerves. Some species have linear to lanceolate leaves, and others have elliptic- to ovate-shaped leaves; often the leaves decrease in size as they progress up the stems. Leaf bases gradually increase in width away from the petioles or the bases are rounded to heart shaped. Most species have leaf margins that are entire, but sometimes they are dentate or serrate.

The flowers are collected together into single rounded heads at the ends of long peduncles. The inflorescences have crateriform to hemispheric shaped involucres which are 12–40 mm (0.47–1.57 in) wide. The phyllaries, or bracts below the flower head, are persistent and number 15–50. The phyllaries are produced in a 2–4 series. The receptacles are hemispheric to conic. The paleae (chaffs on the receptacles of many Asteraceae) have orange to reddish purple ends, and are longer than the disc corollas. The paleae bases partially surrounding the cypselae, and are keeled with the apices abruptly constricted to awn-like tips. The ray florets number 8–21 and the corollas are dark purple to pale pink, white, or yellow. The tubes of the corolla are hairless or sparsely hairy, and the laminae are spreading, reflexed, or drooping in habit and linear to elliptic or obovate in shape. The abaxial faces of the laminae are glabrous or moderately hairy. The flower heads have typically 200–300 fertile, bisexual disc florets but some have more. The corollas are pinkish, greenish, reddish-purple or yellow and have tubes shorter than the throats. The pollen is normally yellow in most species, but usually white in E. pallida. The three or four-angled fruits (cypselae), are tan or bicolored with a dark brown band distally. The pappi are persistent and variously crown-shaped with 0 to 4 or more prominent teeth. x = 11.

Plants are generally long lived, with distinctive flowers. The common name "coneflower" comes from the characteristic center "cone" at the center of the flower head. Like all members of the daisy family, the flowering structure is a composite inflorescence, with rose-colored (rarely yellow or white) florets arranged in a prominent, somewhat cone-shaped head – "cone-shaped" because the petals of the outer ray florets tend to point downward (are reflexed) once the flower head opens, thus forming a cone.

== Taxonomy ==
The first Echinacea species were named by European explorers after seeing them in the forests of southeastern North America during the 18th century. The genus Echinacea was then formally described by Linnaeus in 1753, and this specimen as one of five species of Rudbeckia, Rudbeckia purpurea. Conrad Moench subsequently reclassified it in 1794 as the separate but related genus, Echinacea, with the single species Echinacea purpurea, so that the botanical authority is given as (L.) Moench. In 1818, Nuttall, using the original name, described a variety of Rudbeckia purpurea, which he named Rudbeckia purpurea var serotina. In 1836, De Candolle elevated this variety to a species in its own right, as Echinacea serotina (Nutt.) DC, by which time four species of the genus Echinacea were recognised.

Historically, there has been much confusion over the taxonomic treatment of the genus, largely due to the ease with which the taxa hybridize with introgression where species ranges overlap, and high morphological variation. Furthermore it was discovered that the type specimen for Echinacea purpurea (L) Moench was not the one originally described by Linnaeus, but rather that described by De Candolle as Echinacea serotina (Nutt.) DC.

=== Subdivision ===
Many taxonomic treatments of the genus Echinacea have recorded varying numbers of subordinate taxa, ranging between 2 and 11. One of the most widely adopted schemes was that of McGregor (1968), which included nine species, of which two, E. angustifolia DC and E. paradoxa (Norton) Britton, were further divided into two varietals. Treatments that include ten species, differ by the addition of E. serotina (Nutt.) DC. Alternative classification include with four species and eight subspecies, and two subgenera with four species, has been proposed, based on morphology alone, but has proved controversial. This recognised subgenus Echinacea, with the single species E. purpurea, and subgenus Pallida, with three species, E. atrorubens, E. laevigata and E. pallida. In this scheme, other taxa are reduced to variety rank, e.g. E. atrorubens var. neglecta. Subsequently, McGregor's classification was preserved in the Flora of North America (2006).

DNA analysis has been applied to determine the number of Echinacea species, allowing clear distinctions among species based on chemical differences in root metabolites. The research concluded that of the 40 genetically diverse populations of Echinacea studied, there were nine to ten distinct species.

==== Species ====
Plants of the World Online gives nine accepted species, and World Flora Online gives ten:

- Echinacea angustifolia – Narrow-leaf coneflower
- Echinacea atrorubens – Topeka purple coneflower
- Echinacea laevigata – Smooth coneflower, smooth purple coneflower
- Echinacea pallida – Pale purple coneflower
- Echinacea paradoxa – Yellow coneflower, Bush's purple coneflower
- Echinacea purpurea – Purple coneflower, eastern purple coneflower
- Echinacea sanguinea – Sanguine purple coneflower
- Echinacea serotina – Narrow-leaved purple coneflower
- Echinacea simulata – Wavyleaf purple coneflower
- Echinacea tennesseensis – Tennessee coneflower

These two databases differ in their treatment of E. serotina (Nutt.) DC. , the former considering this as a synonym of E. purpurea and the latter as a distinct species.

=== Former classification ===
- Rudbeckia
- Brauneria (1790)

=== Etymology ===
Moench named the genus Echinacea, from the Greek word ἐχῖνος (ekhinos) for hedgehog or sea-urchin, in recognition that in the seed stage, the cone has spiny projections.

== Distribution and habitat ==
Echinacea is restricted to North America, east of the Rocky Mountains, and in the Atlantic drainage area, predominantly the Great Plains and central United States and adjacent areas of Canada. The genus range is from Saskatchewan in the north to almost the Gulf of Mexico in Louisiana and Texas in the south, and from the Ohio oak savannas, glades of Tennessee and the Carolinas in the east, to the Rocky Mountain foothills in the west.

== Conservation ==
Natural populations of Echinacea are threatened by over-harvesting of wild specimens for the herbal product trade, modification of their habitats by humans, and a decrease in the number of pollinators. Major reductions in the size of populations of E. laevigata and E. tennesseensis have led to their classification as endangered species. Insects and other modes of pollen distribution can be detrimental to conservation efforts. E. tennesseensis had recovered sufficiently by 2011 that it was removed from the list.

== Cultivation ==
Many species of Echinacea are cultivated for commercial use, while others, notably E. purpurea, E. angustifolia, and E. pallida, are grown as ornamental plants in gardens. Many cultivars exist, and many of them are asexually propagated to keep them true to type.

== Uses ==
Echinacea has long been used as a traditional medicine.

=== History ===
Echinacea angustifolia was widely used by the North American Indigenous peoples as folk medicine, with archaeological evidence dating back to the 18th century. Traditional use included external application (insect bites, burns, wounds), chewing of roots (throat and tooth infections) and internal use (cough, pain, snake bites, stomach cramps). Some Plains tribes used Echinacea for cold symptoms. The Kiowa used it for coughs and sore throats, the Cheyenne for sore throats, the Pawnee for headaches, and many tribes, including the Lakota, used it as a pain medication. Early European settlers noticed this and began to develop their own uses. According to Wallace Sampson, its modern use for the common cold began when a Swiss herbal supplement maker was told that Echinacea was used for cold prevention by Native American tribes who lived in the area of South Dakota. The first preparation was Meyers Blood Purifier (c. 1880), which was promoted for neuralgia, rattlesnake bites and rheumatism. By the start of the 20th century it was the most common herbal remedy in America. Commercial cultivation began in Germany in the late 1930s, and in Switzerland in 1950, by A. Vogel. Soon chemists and pharmacologists began the task of identifying potentially active ingredients and their properties. These included alkylamides, cichoric acid, echinacoside, ketoalkenes and polysaccharides. Extracts appeared to exhibit immunostimulant properties and were mainly promoted for the prevention and treatment of colds, influenza and sepsis. Despite many different preparations and hundreds of publications, no exact identification of a truly active ingredient has been identified.

=== Infectious diseases ===
According to a 2025 meta-analysis, Echinacea purpurea may reduce upper respiratory tract infection incidence, duration, and antibiotic use in children, with some benefit for otitis media, though safety remains unclear. According to a 2014 meta-analysis, Echinacea preparations have not been conclusively shown to effectively prevent or treat common colds. According to a 2015 meta-analysis, Echinacea extracts reduce the risk of recurrent respiratory infections and related complications, especially in susceptible individuals.

=== Side effects ===
When taken by mouth, Echinacea does not usually cause side effects, but may have undesirable interactions with various drugs prescribed for diseases, such as heart disease, bleeding, and autoimmune diseases, such as rheumatoid arthritis, lupus, or psoriasis. Although there are no specific case reports of drug interactions with Echinacea, safety about taking Echinacea supplements is not well understood, with possibilities that it may cause side effects, such as nausea, stomach upset or diarrhea, and that it may have adverse reactions with other medications. One of the most extensive and systematic studies to review the safety of Echinacea products concluded that overall, "adverse events are rare, mild and reversible," with the most common symptoms being "gastrointestinal and skin-related." Such side effects include nausea, abdominal pain, diarrhea, itch, and rash. Echinacea has also been linked to allergic reactions, including asthma, shortness of breath, and one case of anaphylaxis. Muscle and joint pain has been associated with Echinacea, but it may have been caused by cold or flu symptoms for which the Echinacea products were administered. There are isolated case reports of rare and idiosyncratic reactions including thrombocytopenic purpura, leucopenia, hepatitis, kidney failure, and atrial fibrillation, although it is not clear that these were due to Echinacea itself. Up to 58 drugs or supplements may interact with Echinacea.

As a matter of manufacturing safety, one investigation by an independent-consumer testing laboratory found that five of eleven selected retail Echinacea products failed quality testing. Four of the failing products contained levels of phenols below the potency level stated on the labels. One failing product was contaminated with lead.

==== Children under 12 years old ====
The European Herbal Medicinal Products Committee (HMPC) and the UK Herbal Medicines Advisory Committee (HMAC) recommended against the use of Echinacea-containing products in children under the age of 12. Manufacturers re-labelled all oral Echinacea products that had product licenses for children with a warning that they should not be given to children under 12 as a precautionary measure.

==== Pregnancy ====
Although research has not found increased risk of birth defects associated with use of Echinacea during the first trimester, it is recommended that pregnant women should avoid Echinacea products until stronger safety supporting evidence becomes available.

==== Lactation ====
It is recommended that women breastfeeding should use caution with Echinacea products due to insufficient safety information available.

==== General precaution ====
The U.S. Food and Drug Administration recommends caution about using dietary supplements, because some products may not be risk free under certain circumstances, or may interact with prescription and over-the-counter medicines.

As with any herbal preparation, individual doses of Echinacea may vary significantly in chemical composition. Inconsistent process control in manufactured echinacea products may involve poor inter- and intra-batch homogeneity, species or plant part differences, variable extraction methods, and contamination or adulteration with other products, leading to potential for substantial product variability.

=== Research ===
Echinacea products vary widely in composition. They contain different species (E. purpurea, E. angustifolia, E. pallida), different plant segments (roots, flowers, extracts), different preparations (extracts and expressed juice), and different chemical compositions which complicate understanding of a potential effect. Well-controlled clinical trials are limited and low in quality, with little scientific evidence that Echinacea supplement products are useful for treating any disease.

According to Cancer Research UK, "There is no scientific evidence to show that echinacea can help treat, prevent or cure cancer in any way. Some therapists have claimed that echinacea can help relieve side effects from cancer treatments such as chemotherapy and radiotherapy, but this has not been proven either."

Although there are multiple scientific reviews and meta-analyses published on the supposed immunological effects of Echinacea, there is significant variability of products used among studies, leading to low-quality or no evidence for efficacy and safety, leading to considerable controversy. Consequently, regulatory authorities, such as the United States Food and Drug Administration, have not approved Echinacea products as safe and effective for any health or therapeutic purpose.

== See also ==
- List of ineffective cancer treatments

== Bibliography ==
=== Books and documents ===
- European Union (24 November 2015). "European Union herbal monograph on Echinacea purpurea (L.) Moench, herba recens" (PDF). Committee on Herbal Medicinal Products, European Medicines Agency. Archived from the original (PDF) on 19 June 2018.
- Kindscher, Kelly, ed. (30 September 2006). The Conservation Status of Echinacea Species (PDF). USDA. Archived from the original (PDF) on September 24, 2015.
- Kindscher, Kelly, ed. (2016). Echinacea: Herbal Medicine with a Wild History. Springer Nature. ISBN 978-3-319-18155-4.(additional excerpts here)
- McKeown, K A (1999). "A Review of the Taxonomy of the Genus Echinacea". In Janick, Jules (ed.). Perspectives on New Crops and New Uses. ASHS Press. pp. 482–489. ISBN 978-0-9615027-0-6.
- Miller, Sandra Carol; Yu, He-ci, eds. (2004). Echinacea: The genus Echinacea. Medicinal and Aromatic Plants - Industrial Profiles. CRC Press. ISBN 978-0-203-02269-6.
- Moerman, Daniel E. (1998). Native American Ethnobotany. Timber Press. ISBN 978-0-88192-453-4.
- Mowrey D (1998). Echinacea. McGraw-Hill Professional. ISBN 978-0-87983-610-8.
- Plowden, C. Chicheley (1972) [1968]. A Manual of Plant Names (3rd ed.). Allen & Unwin. ISBN 978-0-04-580007-0.(Available here at Internet Archive)

Historical sources

- de Candolle, A. P. (1824–1873). Prodromus systematis naturalis regni vegetabilis, sive, Enumeratio contracta ordinum generum specierumque plantarum huc usque cognitarium, juxta methodi naturalis, normas digesta 17 vols. Paris: Treuttel et Würtz.
- Linnaeus, Carl (1753). "Rudbeckia". Species Plantarum: exhibentes plantas rite cognitas, ad genera relatas, cum differentiis specificis, nominibus trivialibus, synonymis selectis, locis natalibus, secundum systema sexuale digestas. 2 vols. Vol. 2. Stockholm: Impensis Laurentii Salvii. p. 907., see also Species Plantarum
- Moench, Conrad (1794). "Echinacea". Methodus plantas horti botanici et agri Marburgensis: a staminum situ describendi (in Latin). Marburg: Marburgi cattorum: in officina nova libraria academiae. p. 591.
- Nuttall, Thomas (1818). The Genera of North American Plants: And a Catalogue of the Species, to the Year 1817. 2 vols. Vol. 1. Philadelphia: Nuttall. ISBN 978-0-608-40885-9. (Volume 2, both volumes also available here at BHL)

=== Chapters ===
- Kindscher, Kelly (2007). "Plant Lore". In Wishart, David J. (ed.). Encyclopedia of the Great Plains Indians. University of Nebraska Press. p. 166. ISBN 978-0-8032-9862-0.(Excerpted and expanded from Wishart, David J. (2004). Encyclopedia of the Great Plains. U of Nebraska Press. p. 309. ISBN 978-0-8032-4787-1., also searchable at Internet Archive, here)
- Kindscher, Kelly; Wittenberg, Rebecca (2006). The naming and classification of Echinacea species. pp. 8–31., in Kindscher (2006)
- Kindscher, Kelly; Wittenberg, Rebecca (2016). The naming and classification of Echinacea species. pp. 37–45., in Kindscher (2016)
- Binns, S. E.; Arnason, J. T.; Baum, B. R. (2004). Taxonomic history and revision of the genus Echinacea. pp. 3–11., in Miller & Yu (2004)
- Panero, J L (2007). "Heliantheae". In Kadereit, Joachim W.; Jeffrey, Charles; Kubitzki, Klaus (eds.). The families and genera of vascular plants v. 8 Flowering Plants. Eudicots: Asterales. Springer Science & Business Media. pp. 440–477. ISBN 978-3-540-31051-8.

=== Articles ===
- Barnes, Joanne; Anderson, Linda A; Gibbons, Simon; Phillipson, J David (August 2005). "Echinacea species (Echinacea angustifolia (DC.) Hell., Echinacea pallida (Nutt.) Nutt., Echinacea purpurea (L.) Moench): a review of their chemistry, pharmacology and clinical properties". Journal of Pharmacy and Pharmacology. 57 (8): 929–954. doi:10.1211/0022357056127. PMID 16102249. S2CID 25151912.
- Hobbs, Christopher (Winter 1994). "Echinacea: A Literature Review: Botany, History, Chemistry, Pharmacology, Toxicology, and Clinical Uses". HerbalGram (30): 33–48.
- Hostettmann, K. (2003). "Geschichte einer Pflanze am Beispiel von Echinacea" [History of a plant: the example of Echinacea]. Complementary Medicine Research (in German). 10 (1): 9–12. doi:10.1159/000071678. PMID 12808356. S2CID 72348436.
- Perry, Ann (March 2010). "No Easy Answers to Echinacea's Evolution" (PDF). Agricultural Research. 58 (3): 22.

Taxonomy and phylogeny

- Binns, Shannon E.; Baum, Bernard R.; Arnason, John T. (2001). "Typification of Echinacea purpurea (L.) Moench (Heliantheae: Asteraceae) and its implications for the correct naming of two Echinacea taxa". Taxon. 50 (4): 1169–1175. Bibcode:2001Taxon..50.1169B. doi:10.2307/1224737. JSTOR 1224737.
- Binns, Shannon E.; Baum, Bernard R.; Arnason, John Thor (2002). "A Taxonomic Revision of Echinacea (Asteraceae: Heliantheae)". Systematic Botany. 27 (3): 610–632. JSTOR 3093966.
- Flagel, L. E.; Rapp, R. A.; Grover, C. E.; Widrlechner, M. P.; Hawkins, J.; Grafenberg, J. L.; Alvarez, I.; Chung, G. Y.; Wendel, J. F. (1 June 2008). "Phylogenetic, morphological, and chemotaxonomic incongruence in the North American endemic genus Echinacea" (PDF). American Journal of Botany. 95 (6): 756–765. Bibcode:2008AmJB...95..756F. doi:10.3732/ajb.0800049. hdl:10261/15034. PMID 21632401.
- McGregor, Ronald L (1968). "The taxonomy of the genus Echinacea (Compositae)". University of Kansas Science Bulletin. 48: 113–142.
- Urbatsch, Lowell E.; Baldwin, Bruce G.; Donoghue, Michael J. (July 2000). "Phylogeny of the Coneflowers and Relatives (Heliantheae: Asteraceae) Based on Nuclear rDNA Internal Transcribed Spacer (ITS) Sequences and Chlorplast DNA Restriction Site Data". Systematic Botany. 25 (3): 539. Bibcode:2000SysBo..25..539U. doi:10.2307/2666695. JSTOR 2666695. S2CID 28581817.
- Zhang, N; Erickson, DL; Ramachandran, P; Ottesen, AR; Timme, RE; Funk, VA; Luo, Y; Handy, SM (16 March 2017). "An analysis of Echinacea chloroplast genomes: Implications for future botanical identification". Scientific Reports. 7 (1): 216. Bibcode:2017NatSR...7..216Z. doi:10.1038/s41598-017-00321-6. PMC 5428300. PMID 28303008.

Traditional medicine

- Ang-Lee, Michael K.; Moss, Jonathan; Yuan, Chun-Su (11 July 2001). "Herbal Medicines and Perioperative Care". JAMA. 286 (2): 208–216. doi:10.1001/jama.286.2.208. PMID 11448284.
- Canlas, Judith; Hudson, James B; Sharma, Manju; Nandan, Devki (September 2010). "Echinacea and trypanasomatid parasite interactions: Growth-inhibitory and anti-inflammatory effects of Echinacea". Pharmaceutical Biology. 48 (9): 1047–1052. doi:10.3109/13880200903483468. PMID 20731557.
- Hart, Anna; Dey, Paola (August 2009). "Echinacea for prevention of the common cold: An illustrative overview of how information from different systematic reviews is summarised on the internet". Preventive Medicine. 49 (2–3): 78–82. doi:10.1016/j.ypmed.2009.04.006. PMID 19389422.
- Huntley, Alyson L; Thompson Coon, Joanna; Ernst, Edzard (2005). "The Safety of Herbal Medicinal Products Derived from Echinacea Species: A Systematic Review". Drug Safety. 28 (5): 387–400. doi:10.2165/00002018-200528050-00003. PMID 15853441. S2CID 25239464.
- Izzo, Angelo A.; Ernst, Edzard (September 2009). "Interactions Between Herbal Medicines and Prescribed Drugs: An Updated Systematic Review". Drugs. 69 (13): 1777–1798. doi:10.2165/11317010-000000000-00000. PMID 19719333. S2CID 25720882.
- Karsch-Völk, Marlies; Barrett, Bruce; Kiefer, David; Bauer, Rudolf; Ardjomand-Woelkart, Karin; Linde, Klaus (20 February 2014). "Echinacea for preventing and treating the common cold". Cochrane Database of Systematic Reviews. 2 (2) CD000530. doi:10.1002/14651858.CD000530.pub3. PMC 4068831. PMID 24554461.
- Mullins, Raymond J (February 1998). "Echinacea-associated anaphylaxis". Medical Journal of Australia. 168 (4): 170–171. doi:10.5694/j.1326-5377.1998.tb126773.x. PMID 9507713. S2CID 11837168.
- Schapowal, A; Klein, P; Johnston, SL (March 2015). "Echinacea reduces the risk of recurrent respiratory tract infections and complications: a meta-analysis of randomized controlled trials". Advances in Therapy. 32 (3): 187–200. doi:10.1007/s12325-015-0194-4. PMID 25784510. S2CID 1294616.
- Shah, Sachin A; Sander, Stephen; White, C Michael; Rinaldi, Mike; Coleman, Craig I (July 2007). "Evaluation of echinacea for the prevention and treatment of the common cold: a meta-analysis". The Lancet Infectious Diseases. 7 (7): 473–480. doi:10.1016/S1473-3099(07)70160-3. PMC 7106401. PMID 17597571.
- Turner, Ronald B.; Bauer, Rudolf; Woelkart, Karin; Hulsey, Thomas C.; Gangemi, J. David (28 July 2005). "An Evaluation of Echinacea angustifolia in Experimental Rhinovirus Infections". New England Journal of Medicine. 353 (4): 341–348. doi:10.1056/NEJMoa044441. PMID 16049208.

=== Websites ===
- Chang, Louise (26 June 2007). "Study: Echinacea Cuts Colds by Half. Skeptic Remains Unconvinced by New Analysis". WebMD.
- Cooperman, Tod (17 July 2021). "Echinacea Supplements Review". Product reviews. ConsumerLab.* Kindscher, Kelly (2021). "Conservation planning for Echinacea species". Kansas Biological Survey: Research - medicinal plants. University of Kansas.
- Fish and Wildlife Service (3 August 2011). "Endangered and Threatened Wildlife and Plants; Removal of Echinacea tennesseensis (Tennessee Purple Coneflower) From the Federal List of Endangered and Threatened Plants". Federal Register. Department of the Interior.
- NCCIH (July 2020). "Echinacea". US National Institutes of Health.
- NCCIH (December 2020a). "The Common Cold and Complementary Health Approaches: What the Science Says". US National Institutes of Health.
- Drugsite (8 April 2021). "Echinacea Uses, Benefits & Dosage - Drugs.com Herbal Database". Drugs.com. New Zealand: Drugsite Trust.
- Cancer Research UK (18 January 2019). "Echinacea". Complementary and alternative therapies.
- Natural Standard Research Collaboration (1 November 2013). "Echinacea (Echinacea angustifolia, Echinacea pallida, Echinacea purpurea)". Drugs and supplements. Mayo Clinic. Archived from the original on 8 July 2017.
- MHRA (20 August 2014). "Echinacea herbal products should not be used in children under 12 years old". The National Archives (Press release).
- FDA (29 November 2017). "What You Need to Know about Dietary Supplements". Food: Consumers. Archived from the original on June 11, 2019.

Databases and floras

- McCoy, Ann; Widrlechner, Mark; Carstens, Jeff (October 2005). "A Comprehensive Echinacea Germplasm Collection Located at the North Central Regional Plant Introduction Station" (PDF). Iowa Botanical Supplement Research Center (Conference poster). USDA/ARS, Iowa State University, Ames.(Fifty-Fifth Annual Meeting of the Eastern Region of the International Plant Propagators' Society)
- Urbatsch, Lowell E.; Neubig, Kurt M.; Cox, Patricia B. (2006). "Echinacea Moench, Methodus. 591. 1794". Flora of North America. New York: Oxford University Press. p. 88.
- "Echinacea purpurea (L.) Moench". Tropicos. Missouri Botanical Garden. 2021.
- POWO (2021). "Echinacea Moench". Plants of the World Online. Royal Botanic Gardens, Kew.
- WFO (2021). "Echinacea".
