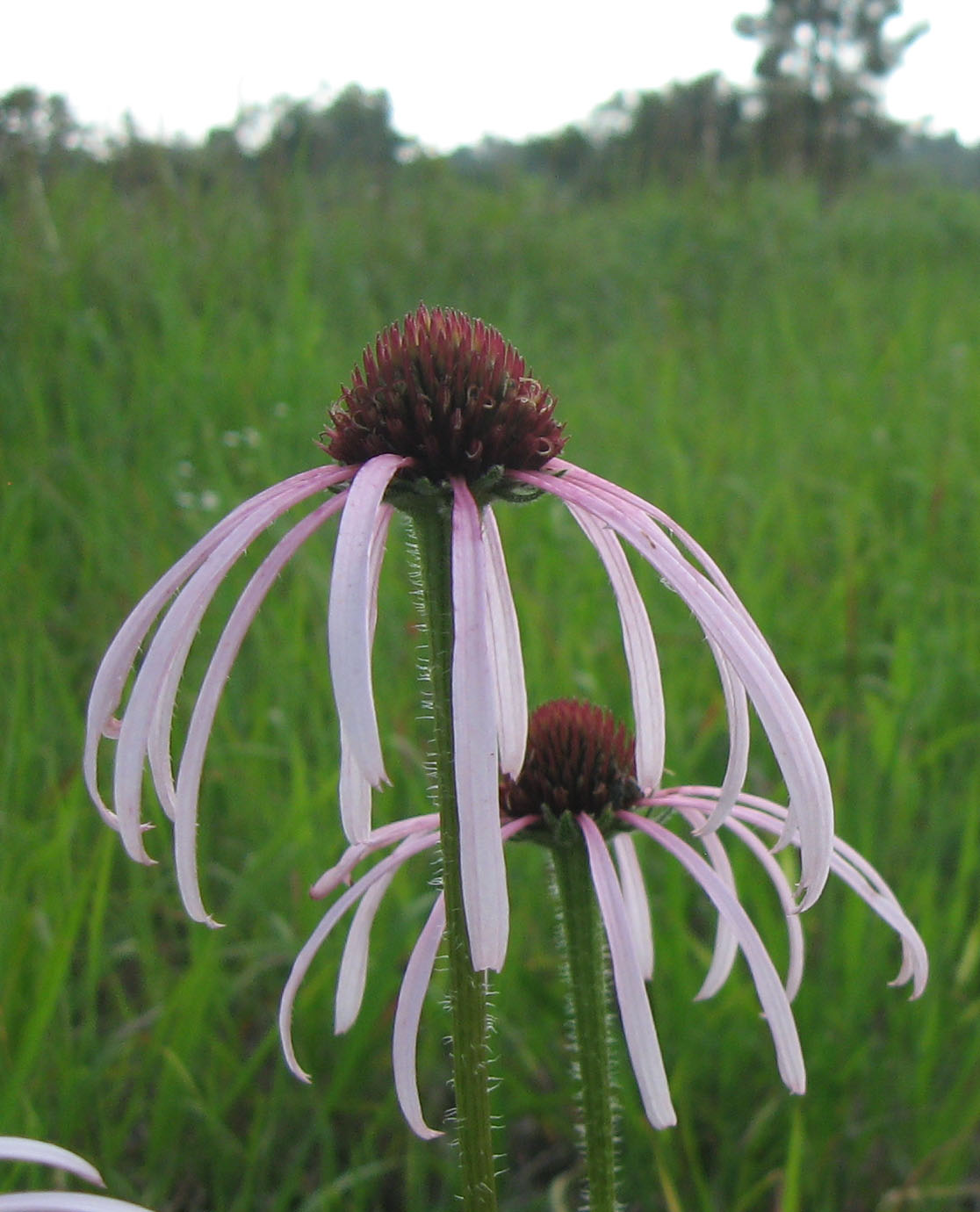

Conservation status
- Apparently Secure (NatureServe)

Scientific classification
- Kingdom: Plantae
- Clade: Tracheophytes
- Clade: Angiosperms
- Clade: Eudicots
- Clade: Asterids
- Order: Asterales
- Family: Asteraceae
- Genus: Echinacea
- Species: E. simulata

Binomial name
- Echinacea simulata R.L.McGregor

Synonyms
- Echinacea speciosa McGregor, 1967, illegitimate homonym not (Wenderoth) Paxton 1849; Echinacea pallida var. simulata (McGregor) Binns, B.R.Baum & Arnason

= Echinacea simulata =

Species of flowering plant

Echinacea simulata, commonly called wavy leaf purple coneflower, glade coneflower, or prairie purple coneflower, is a species of perennial flowering plant in the family Asteraceae. It is native to the east-central states of the United States. Its natural habitat is dry, calcareous, open areas such as barrens and woodlands.

== Description ==
Echinacea simulata is very similar in appearances to E. pallida, which has a different chromosome number. The most readily distinguishing morphological feature is that E. simulata has yellow pollen grains. More work is needed to determine the physical and ecological differences between these two taxa.

This species grows on usually unbranched stems up to 100 centimetres (3.3 ft) tall from a branched fusiform taproot. The foliage and stems have spreading hairs that are sparsely to densely distributed. The stems are mostly green or purple mottled. The plant has both basal leaves and leaves along the stem. Leaves are alternate, simple, lanceolate and 5–40 centimetres (2–16 in) long. They usually have 3 primary veins. The basal leaves and lower stem leaves have petioles that are 4–20 centimetres (1.6–7.9 in) long, and the stem leaves have shorter petioles or no petioles (sessile).

Normally single flower heads are produced on peduncles that are 20–40 centimetres (8–16 in) long. Ray corollas are normally soft rose to pink colored but also rarely off white. There are typically 8 to 21 rays that are 4–9 centimetres (1.6–3.5 in) long and drooping, surrounding a central cone-shaped disk. The phyllaries, or bracts, below the flower heads are lanceolate to ovate, 7–15 millimetres (0.28–0.59 in) wide and 1.5–3 millimetres (0.059–0.118 in) long. The seeds are produced in angled fruits called Cypselae that are tan and 3–4.5 millimetres (0.12–0.18 in) long, with smooth surfaces, normally without hairs.

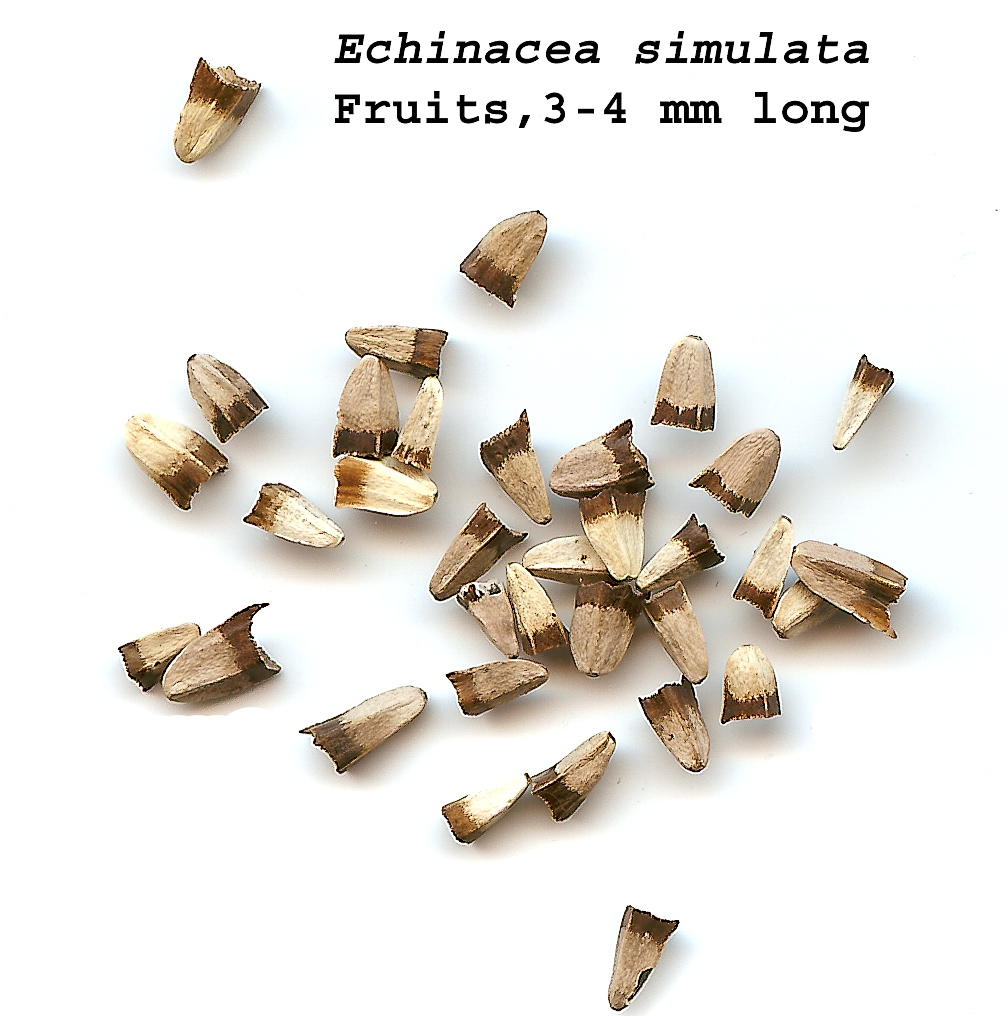
Fruits of Echinacea simulata

== Distribution and habitat ==
E. simulata is native to the east-central states of Arkansas, Georgia, Kansas, Missouri and Tennessee. The plant is rare in Alabama, Georgia, and Tennessee. It is reported as introduced in Illinois. The U.S. Department of Agriculture also reports it as native to North Carolina and Virginia. Wavy leaf purple coneflower has a relatively small distribution, and its locations are still being determined.

The plant grows in glades and open woodlands and prefers dry, calcareous soils.

== Ecology ==
This species blooms in late spring to midsummer. Butterflies and bees are attracted to the nectar and birds eat the seeds in the late summer and fall.
