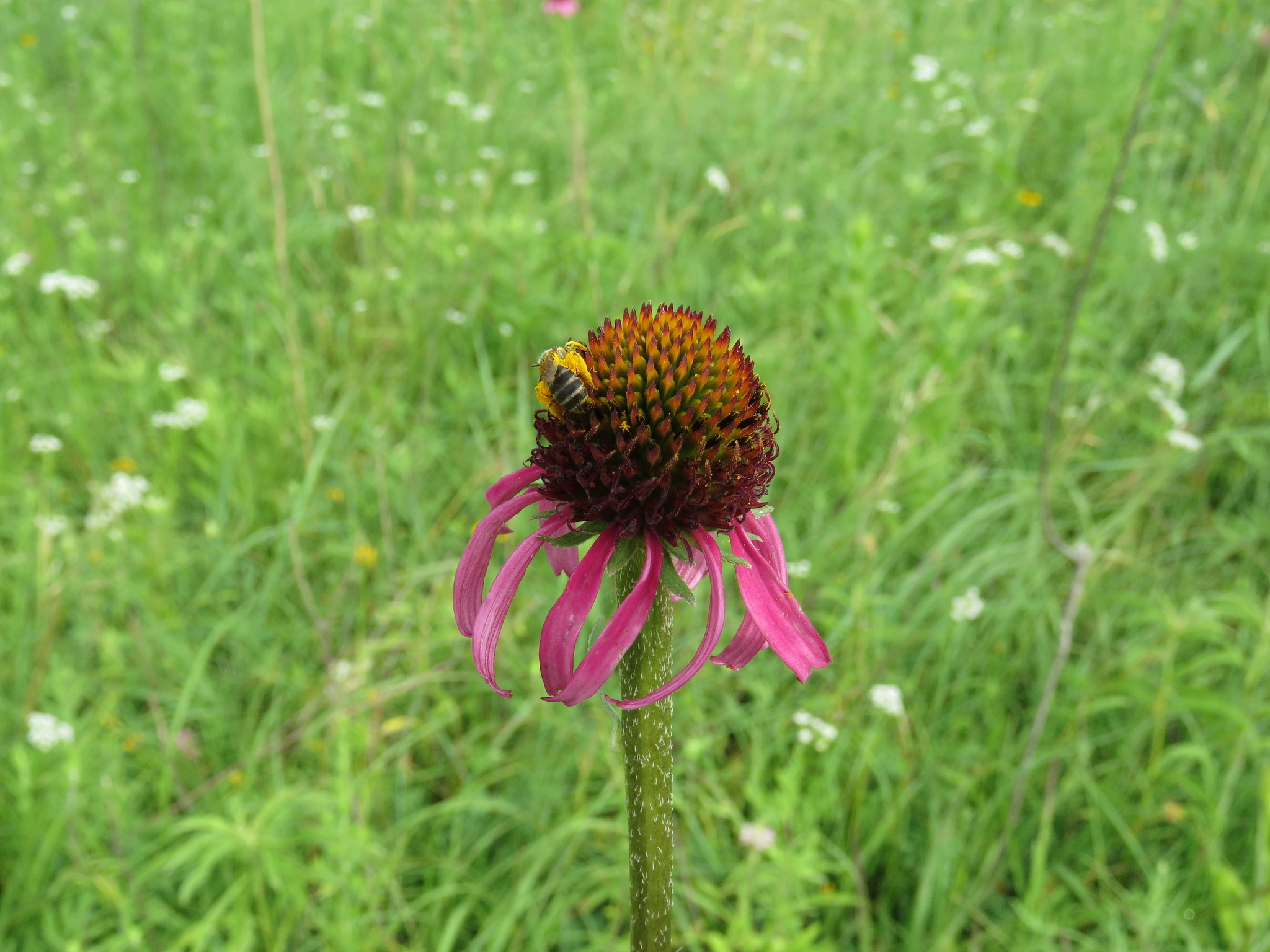

Scientific classification
- Kingdom: Plantae
- Clade: Tracheophytes
- Clade: Angiosperms
- Clade: Eudicots
- Clade: Asterids
- Order: Asterales
- Family: Asteraceae
- Genus: Echinacea
- Species: E. atrorubens

Binomial name
- Echinacea atrorubens (Nutt.) Nutt.

Synonyms
- Brauneria atrorubens C.L.Boynton & Beadle; Rudbeckia atrorubens Nutt.

= Echinacea atrorubens =

Species of flowering plant

Echinacea atrorubens, called the Topeka purple coneflower, is a North American species of flowering plant in the family Asteraceae. It is native to eastern Kansas, Oklahoma, and eastern Texas in the south-central United States. It is found growing in dry soils around limestone or sandstone outcroppings and prairies.

E. atrorubens is a perennial herb up to 90 centimetres (3.0 ft) tall with elongate-turbinate roots that are sometimes branched. The stems and foliage are usually hairy with appressed to ascending hairs 1.2 mm long (strigose), rarely some plants are glabrous. The stems are light green or tan and mottled in color. The basal leaves have petioles 0–12(–20) cm long and leaf blades typically 3 or 5-nerved, usually linear or lanceolate, rarely ovate, 5–30 cm (2–12 in) long and 0.5–3.0 cm (0.20–1.18 in) wide; the margins are normally entire.

Flowering occurs in late spring. The flowering stems or peduncles are 20–50 cm (8–19.5 in) long ending usually with only one flower head. The flowering "cones" with paleae 9–15 mm long, with the ends red to orange-tipped, usually straight, and prickly-pointed. Ray flower corollas are purple or rarely pink or white. Discs or cones are ovoid to conic and 25–35 wide and 20–40 mm tall. Disc corollas are 4.5–5.5 mm long with lobes greenish to pink or purple. Seed cypselae are tan and 4–5 mm long with faces finely tuberculate, glabrous. This species has 11 chromosomes.
