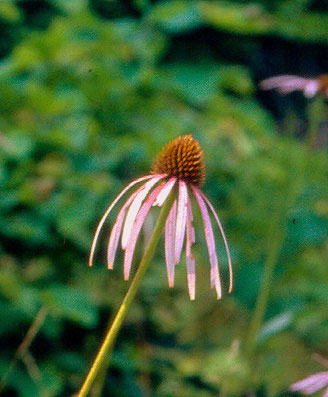

Conservation status
- Imperiled (NatureServe)

- Threatened (ESA)

Scientific classification
- Kingdom: Plantae
- Clade: Tracheophytes
- Clade: Angiosperms
- Clade: Eudicots
- Clade: Asterids
- Order: Asterales
- Family: Asteraceae
- Tribe: Heliantheae
- Genus: Echinacea
- Species: E. laevigata

Binomial name
- Echinacea laevigata (Boynton & Beadle) Blake 1929

Synonyms
- Brauneria laevigata C.L.Boynton & Beadle 1903; Echinacea purpurea var. laevigata (F.E.Boynton & Beadle ex C.L.Boynton & Beadle) Cronquist

= Echinacea laevigata =

Smooth purple coneflower

Species of flowering plant

Echinacea laevigata, the smooth purple coneflower, is a federally listed threatened species of plant found in the Piedmont of the eastern United States. Most populations are found on roadsides and other open areas with plenty of sunlight, often on calcium- and magnesium- rich soils.

== Description ==
Echinacea laevigata is a rhizomatous perennial herb that resembles its close relative, the common echinacea (Echinacea purpurea). The two can be told apart by the leaves, which are cordate (heart-shaped) in the common species. E. laevigata grows up to about 1.5 meters (5 feet) in height with a mostly naked, smooth, leafless stem. Any leaves are roughly lance-shaped. On top of the stem is a flower head containing narrow pink or purplish ray florets up to 8 centimeters (3.2 inches) long. The florets droop away from the center of the head. The small, tubular disc florets in the center are dark purple. Blooming occurs in May through July. The fruit is an achene about half a centimeter long which is likely dispersed by birds and small mammals that collect them for food. Some vegetative reproduction has been observed with more than one stem coming from a shared rhizome or aboveground rosette of leaves.

== Habitat ==
The natural habitat for Echinacea laevigata is sunny openings in forested habitat. Open areas of this kind were made by wildfire, fires set by Native Americans, and the grazing activity of animals. The plant's preferred soils are rich in calcium and magnesium, and include limestone and marble, gabbro, and diabase. Plants that share the habitat included eastern red cedar (Juniperus virginiana) and rattlesnake master (Eryngium yuccifolium). There are several species of oak, but these are stunted allowing sunlight to reach the understory. When human impacts began to reduce the amount of forest habitat remaining in the region, the plant survived in other open, sunny habitat types, such as cedar barrens, clearcuts, roadsides, cleared areas around utility equipment, and limestone bluffs. Two-thirds of the populations known since the plant was first discovered are now gone.

The plant is pollinated by a number of insects, including honeybee (Apis mellifera), bumblebees (Bombus spp.), the bees Psithyrus citrinus and Xylocopa virginica, a number of butterflies, and Lygaeus kalmii, a bug.

== Distribution ==
Its current range is within the states of Virginia, North Carolina, South Carolina, and Georgia, and it was historically also found in Pennsylvania and Maryland. It has been rare as long as it has been known, but a number of human activities and associated processes have reduced its range further. Today there are about 100 occurrences, and many of these are in poor condition. The amount of appropriate habitat available for this plant has been greatly reduced and it continues to decline.

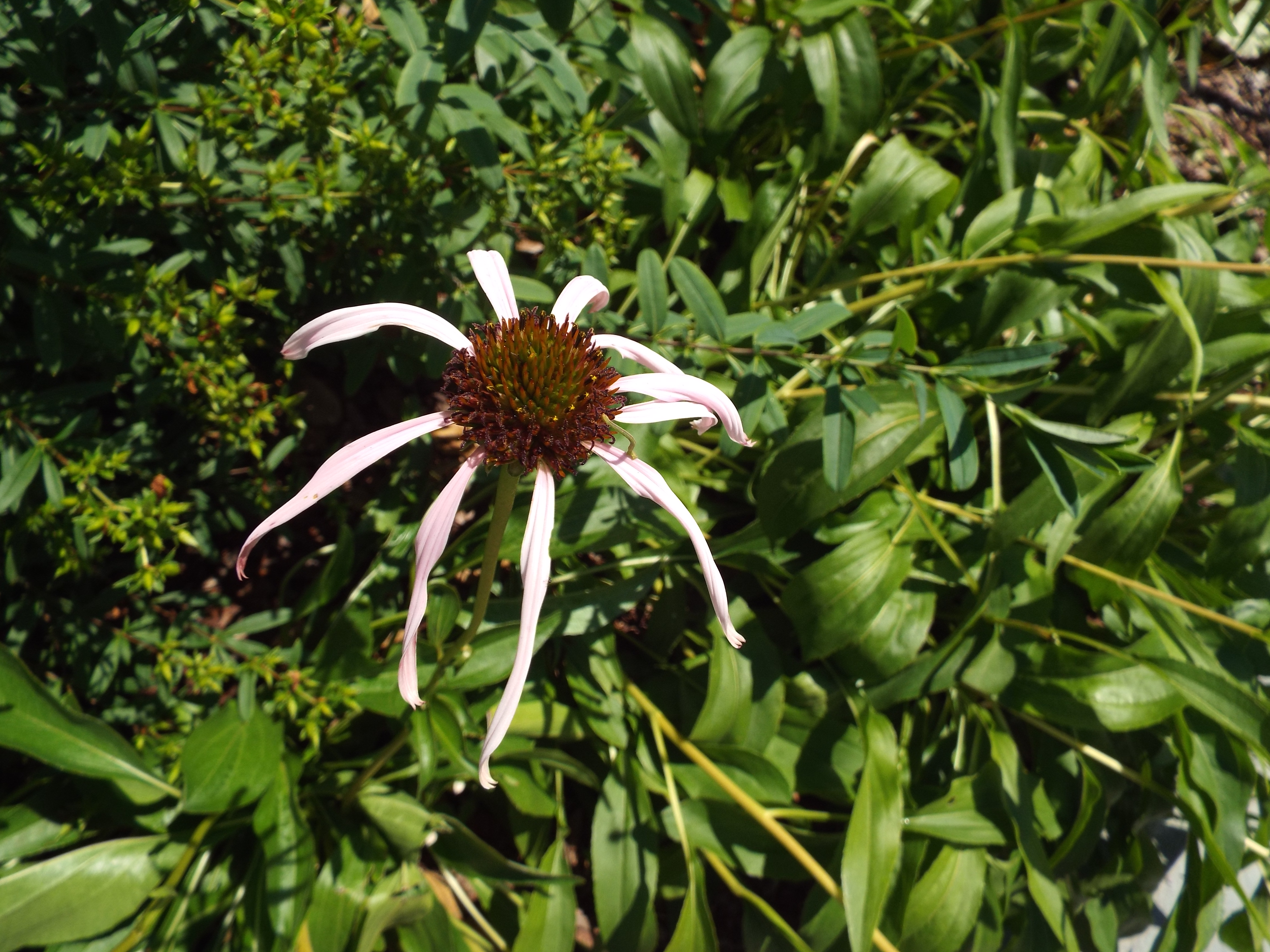
Echinacea laevigata at the National Arboretum in Washington, DC.

== Conservation ==
Continuing threats to Echinacea laevigata include further destruction and degradation of the land, collecting of the plant by flora enthusiasts, vandalism, herbicides, and exotic plant species. When the plant was listed as an endangered species in 1992, most of the populations were small, with many containing fewer than 100 plants each, and half were located on roadsides where they are vulnerable to destruction. There is a fear that this plant may be targeted for commercial harvest in the pharmaceutical echinacea trade, but there is little evidence of this threat so far.

Populations of Echinacea laevigata were lost when the habitat was destroyed, or when it was degraded as natural processes of disturbance were prevented. The plant requires open habitat where it can receive sunlight. When fire suppression is practiced, the habitat becomes overgrown, and the open areas close; this has led to the extirpation of several historical populations. Habitat has also been destroyed outright during development, agricultural operations, road construction, and installation of utilities such as gas lines.

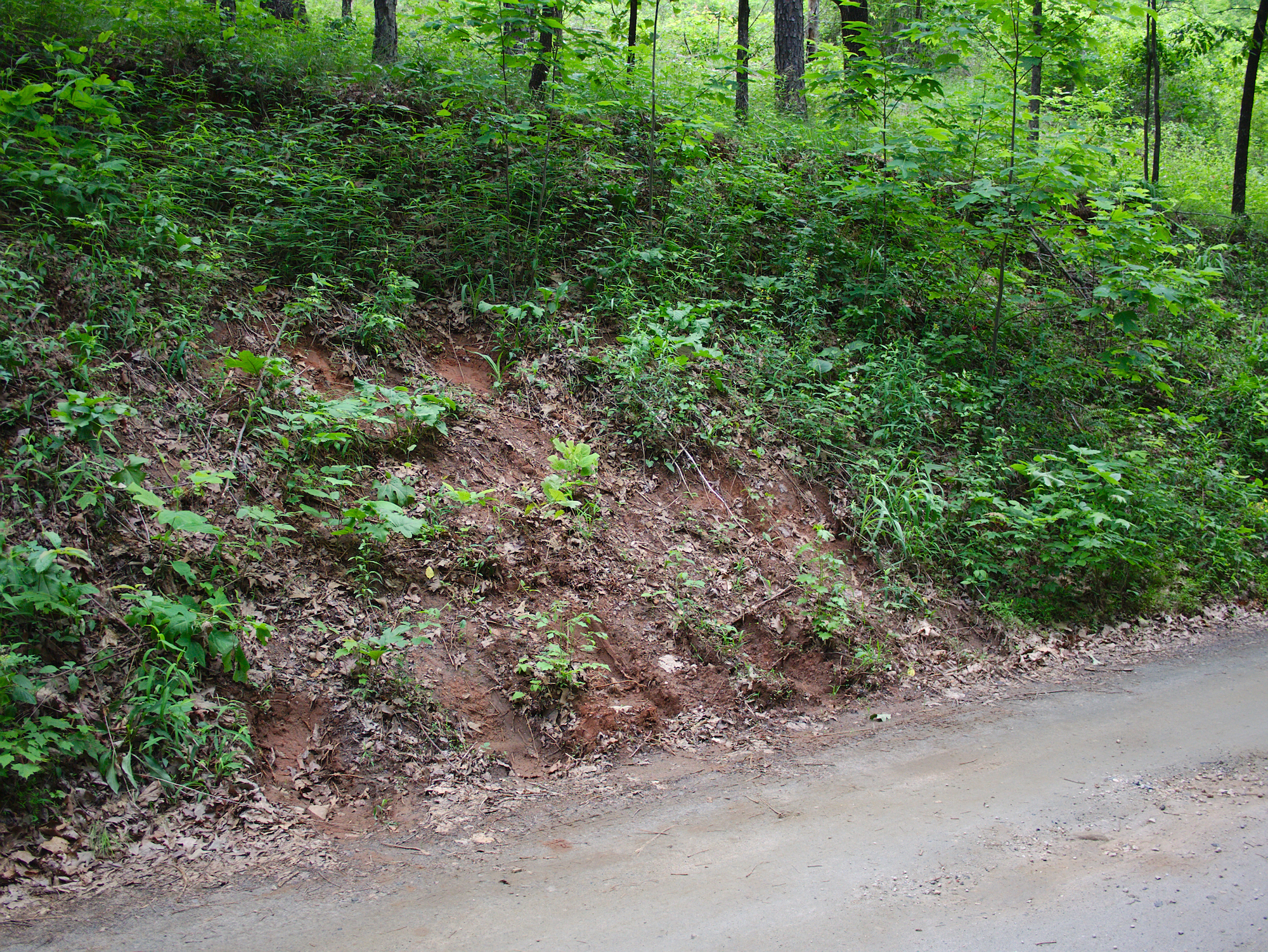
Echinacea laevigata habitat loss due to off-roading activities

Conservation efforts underway include research on the most effective method of restoring the natural cycle of disturbance to the land, for example, by initiating controlled burns.

The U.S. Fish and Wildlife Service reclassified the listing for Echinacea laevigata in 2022 under the Endangered Species Act to threatened. This means it has made a significant recovery since 1992, when it was declared in danger of extinction.
