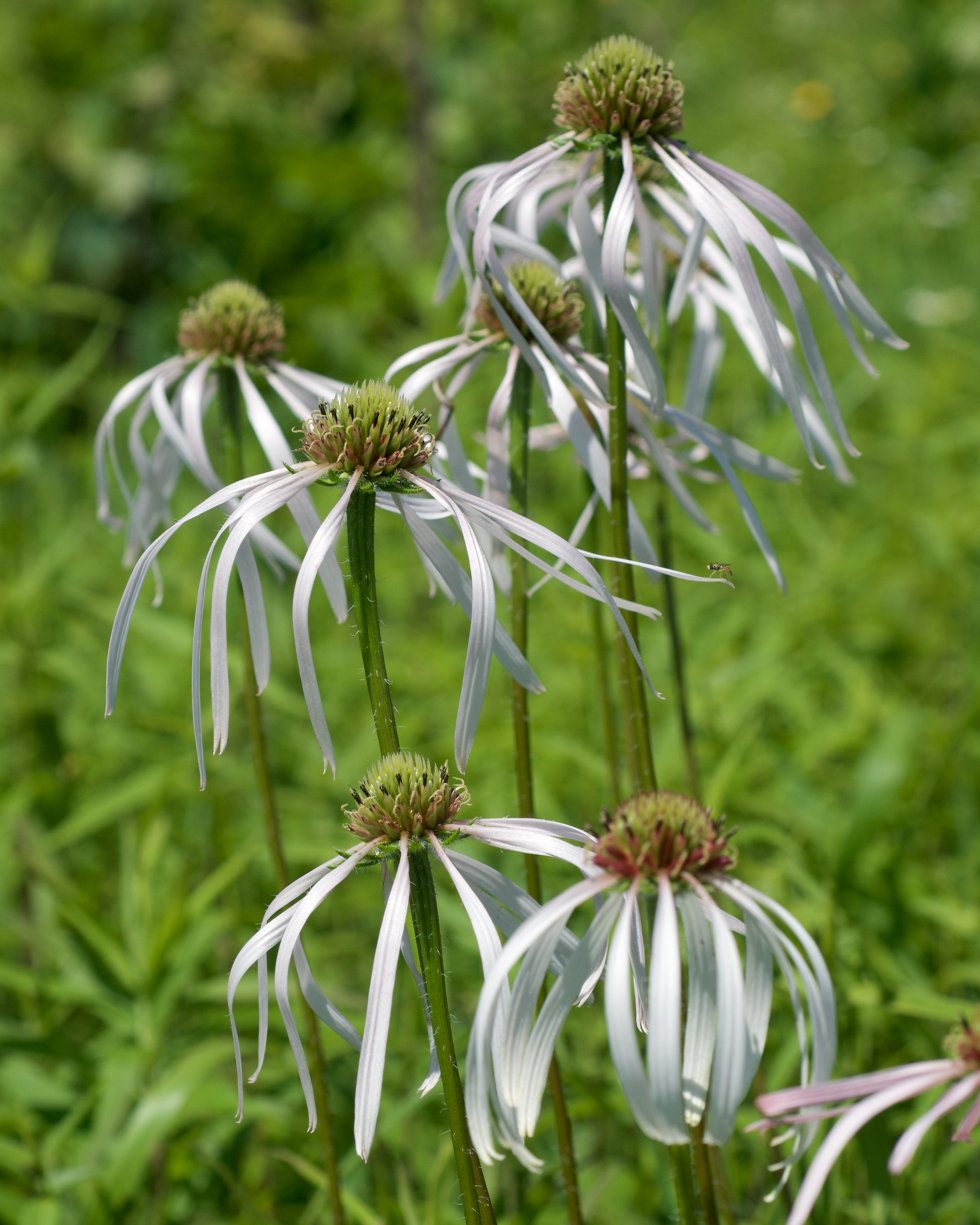

Conservation status
- Apparently Secure (NatureServe)

Scientific classification
- Kingdom: Plantae
- Clade: Tracheophytes
- Clade: Angiosperms
- Clade: Eudicots
- Clade: Asterids
- Order: Asterales
- Family: Asteraceae
- Genus: Echinacea
- Species: E. pallida

Binomial name
- Echinacea pallida (Nutt.) Nutt.

Synonyms
- Rudbeckia pallida Nutt.; Brouneria pallida Britton

= Echinacea pallida =

Species of flowering plant

Echinacea pallida, the pale purple coneflower, is a species of herbaceous perennial plant in the family Asteraceae. It is sometimes grown in gardens and used for medicinal purposes. Its native range is the central region of the United States and Ontario, Canada.

== Description ==
Echinacea pallida is similar to E. angustifolia, but plants often grow taller, ranging from 1.5 to 2.5 ft (45 to 75 cm) tall, with some growing 3 ft (90 cm) or more tall. Plants normally grow with one unbranched stem in the wild, but often produce multi-stemmed clumps in gardens. They have deep taproots that are spindle shaped, wider in the center and narrowing at the ends. Stems are green or mottled with purple and green. The leaves are elongated lanceolate or linear-lanceolate with three veins and are concentrated at the base of the stem. Flower head rays are narrow, linear, elongated, and drooping, ranging from 1 to 3 inches (2.5 to 7.6 cm) long. The flower heads are from 3/4 to 3 inches (1.9 to 7.6 cm) wide with pale rose-purple or nearly white ray florets. The flowers have white pollen. Echinacea pallida blooms from May into July. The fruits are cypselae and are tan or bi-colored with angled edges.

== Distribution ==
It is found in the Mississippi Valley, the southeastern Great Plains, and the region south of Lake Michigan. Most of the known populations are in the region from southern Wisconsin and Iowa south to Louisiana and eastern Texas, with additional reports (many of them likely from introductions) in the Southeastern United States, New England, New York, Michigan, and Ontario.

== Habitat and range ==
Echinacea pallida grows in prairies and prairie remnant sites and requires full sun exposure with well-draining soil. While it prefers moist soils, it is drought tolerant due to its long taproot. It is often found next to roads.

The state of Tennessee lists E. pallida as endangered, and Wisconsin lists the species as threatened, mostly due to habitat loss and over-collection of roots, which are made into herbal medicine. The use of Echinacea as a medicinal plant has not been demonstrated to have any positive health effects. It is a larval host to the silvery checkerspot.

== Gallery ==
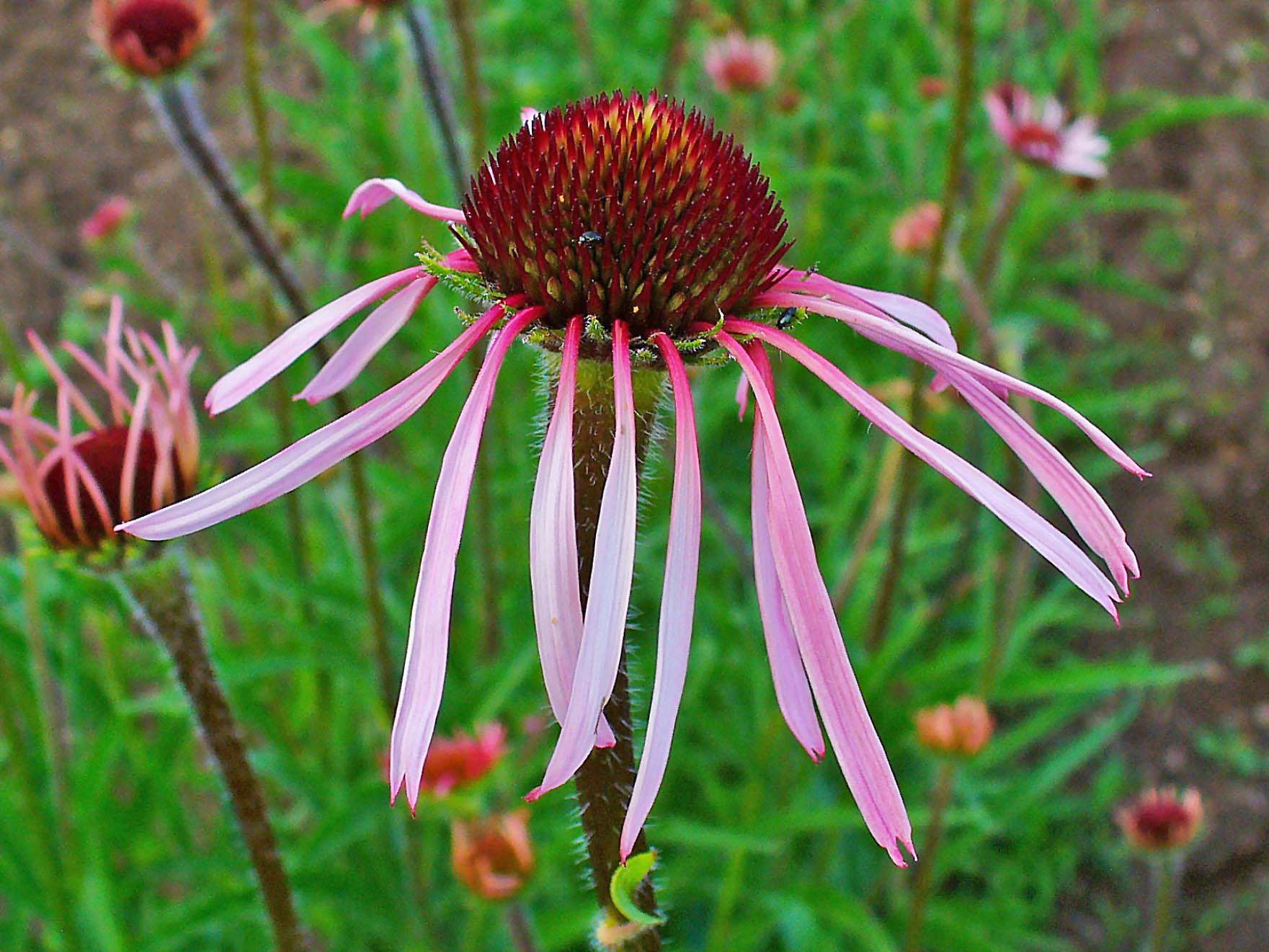
Flowerhead

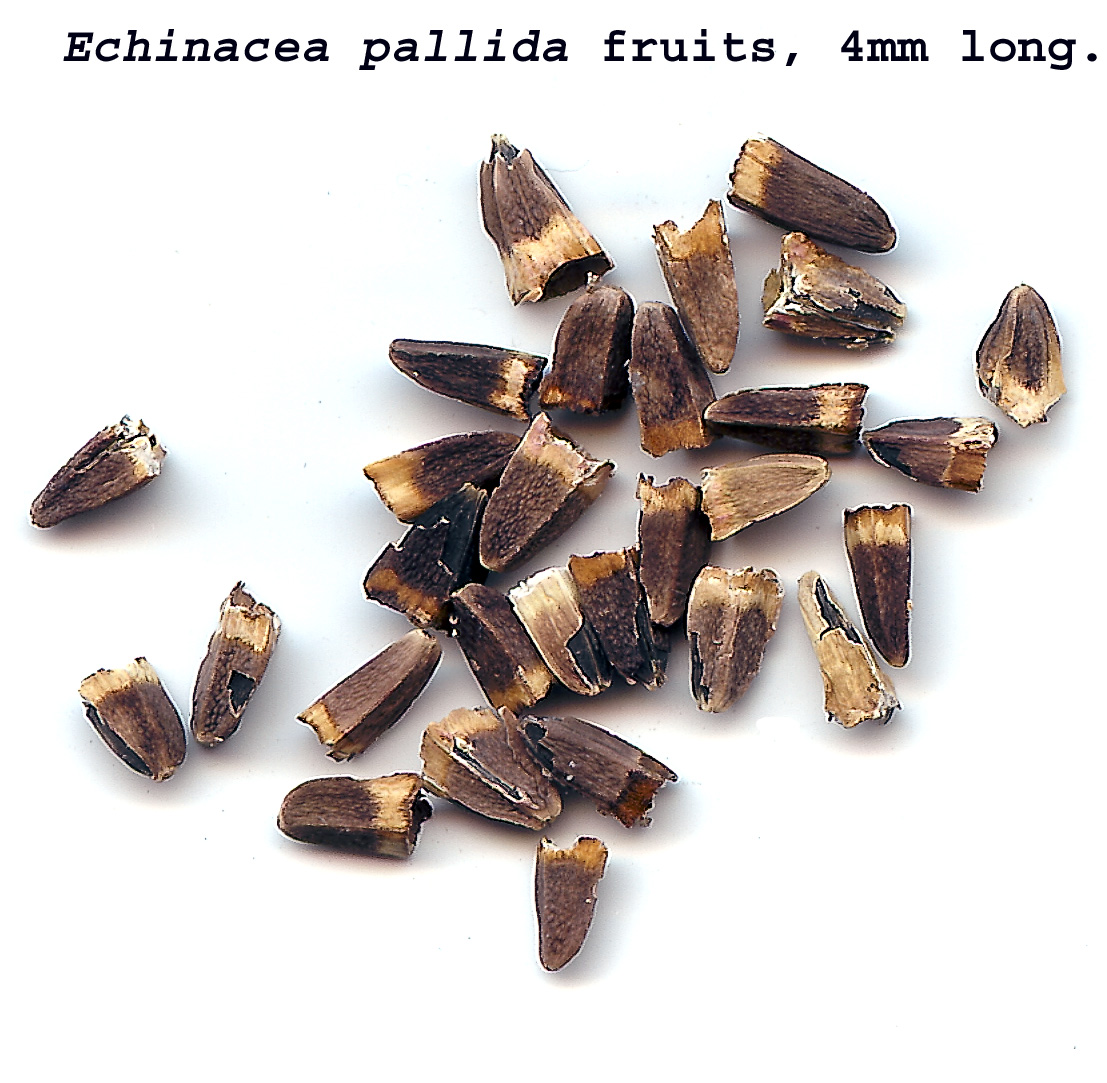
Fruits

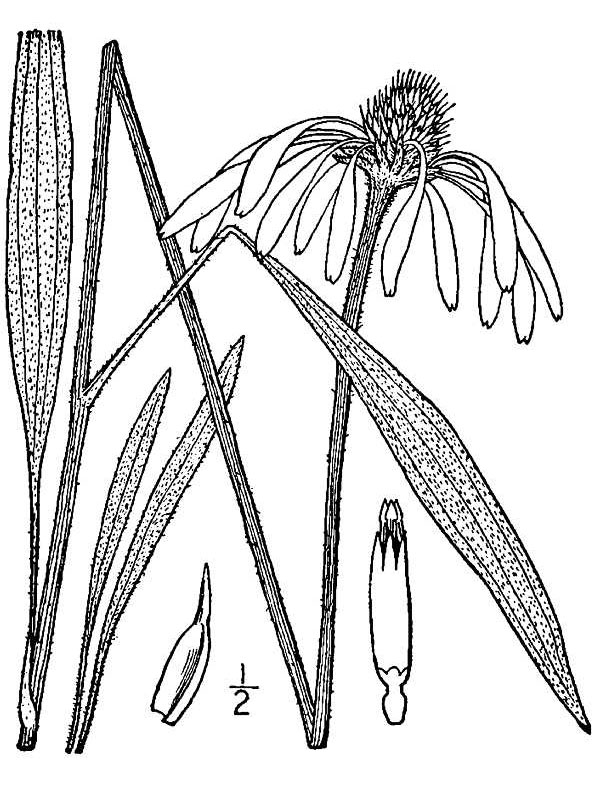
Illustration from Britton and Brown 1913

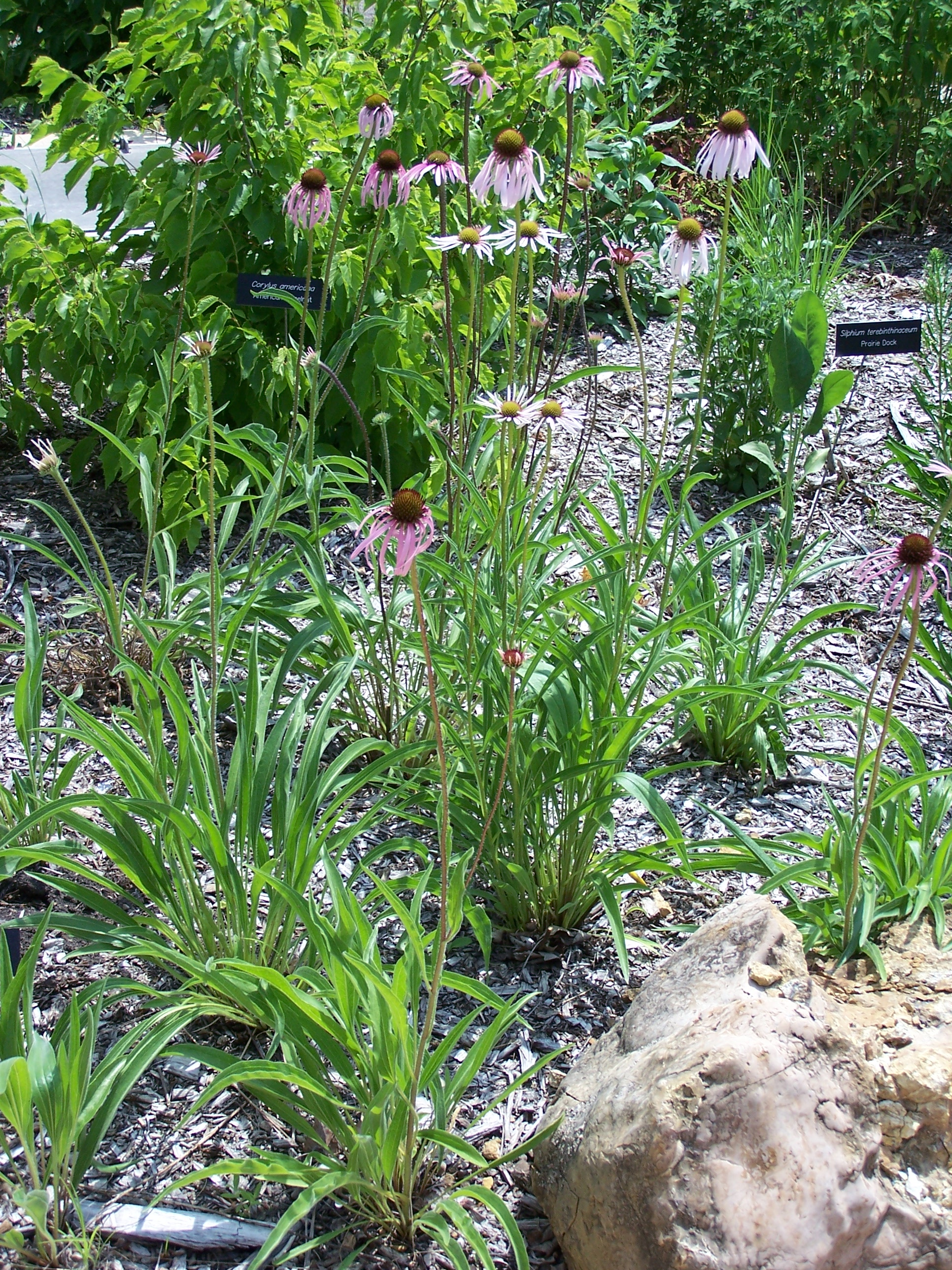
In cultivation at the Minnesota Landscape Arboretum
