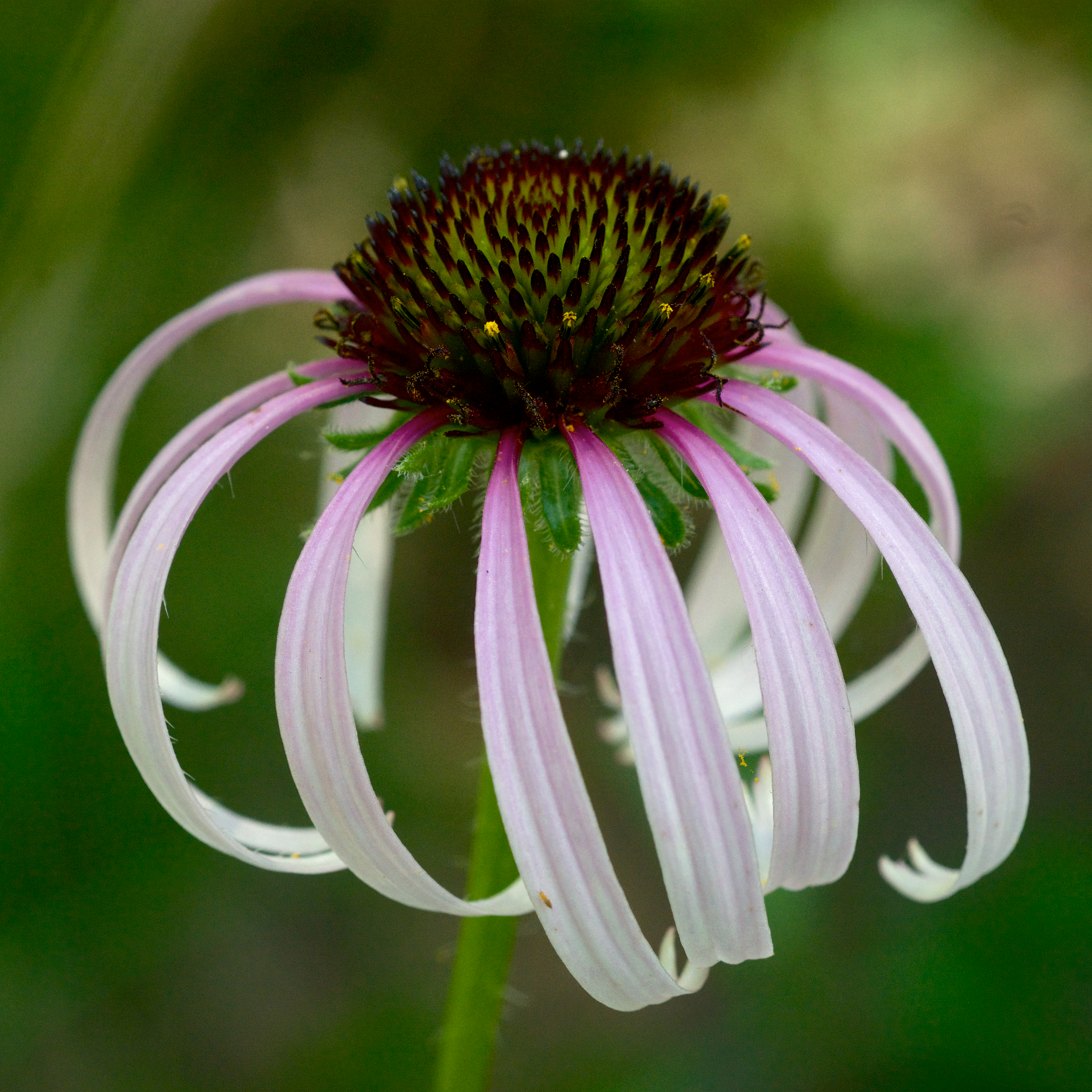

Scientific classification
- Kingdom: Plantae
- Clade: Tracheophytes
- Clade: Angiosperms
- Clade: Eudicots
- Clade: Asterids
- Order: Asterales
- Family: Asteraceae
- Genus: Echinacea
- Species: E. sanguinea

Binomial name
- Echinacea sanguinea Nutt.

Synonyms
- Echinacea pallida var. sanguinea (Nutt.) Gandhi & R.D.Thomas

= Echinacea sanguinea =

Species of flowering plant

Echinacea sanguinea, the sanguine purple coneflower, is a herbaceous perennial native to open sandy fields, open pine woods, and prairies in eastern Texas, southeastern Oklahoma, Louisiana, and southwestern Arkansas. It is the southernmost Echinacea species. The specific epithet sanguinea, which is Latin for "blood", refers to the color of the petals.

== Description ==
It grows up to 120 cm (4 ft) tall with an unbranched stem. The alternate leaves are typically close to the ground, growing 10–25 cm (4–10 in) long and 6 mm (¼ in) wide, with the upper leaves having long hairs.

It flowers from late spring to early summer at low altitudes 0–200 m (0–656 ft). Each stem has one rose-pink to pale purple flower head, up to 5 cm (2 in) long and 12 mm (½ in) wide, with 10–20 ray flowers that conspicuously droop. The 2.5 cm (1 in) cone-shaped center containing the disc florets is purplish-brown on the outside and greenish toward the center.
