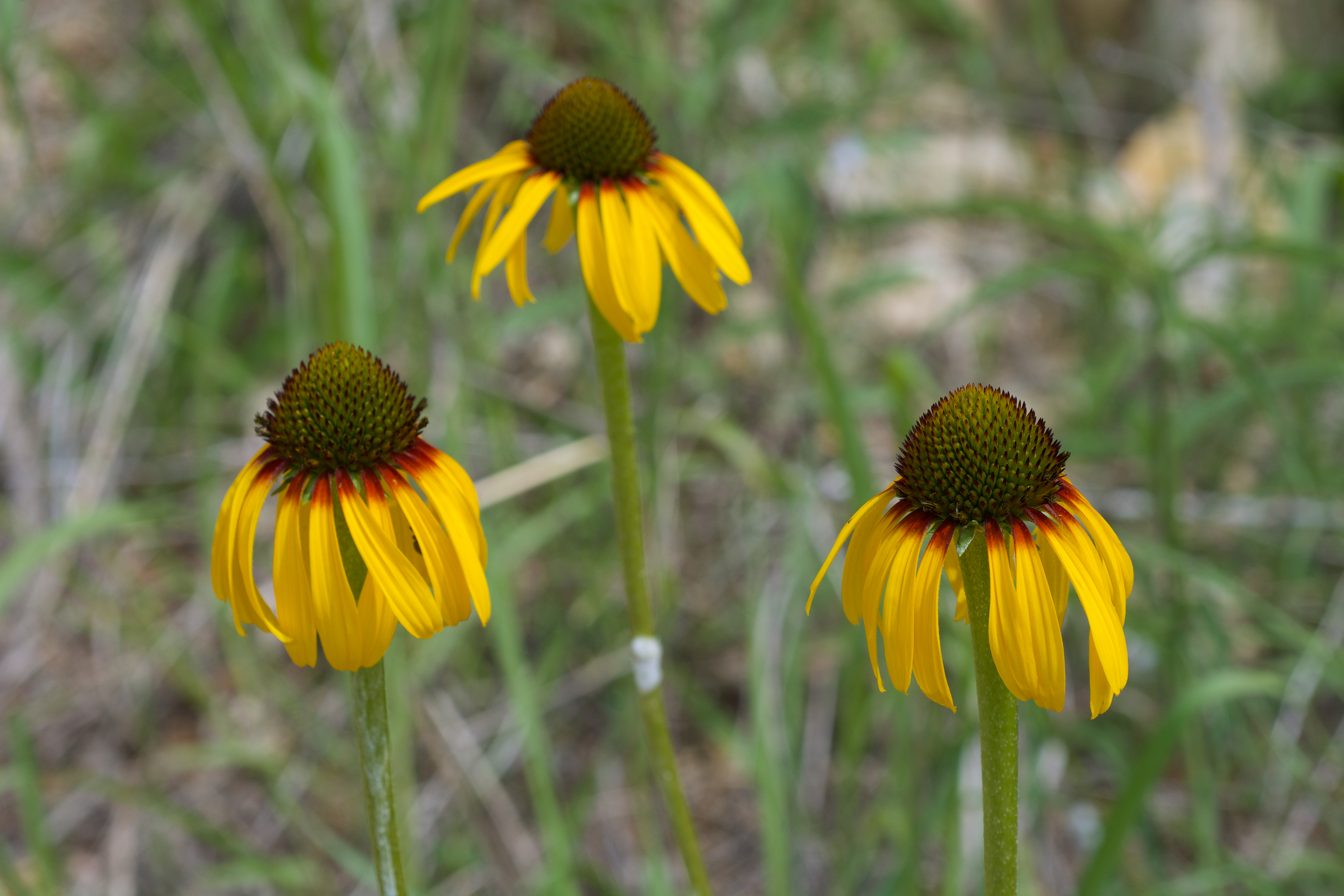

Conservation status
- Vulnerable (NatureServe)

Scientific classification
- Kingdom: Plantae
- Clade: Tracheophytes
- Clade: Angiosperms
- Clade: Eudicots
- Clade: Asterids
- Order: Asterales
- Family: Asteraceae
- Tribe: Heliantheae
- Genus: Echinacea
- Species: E. paradoxa

Binomial name
- Echinacea paradoxa (J. B. S. Norton) Britt.

Synonyms
- Brauneria paradoxa Norton; Echinacea atrorubens var. paradoxa (Norton) Cronquist; Echinacea atrorubens var. neglecta (McGregor) Binns, B.R.Baum & Arnason, syn of var. neglecta

= Echinacea paradoxa =

Species of flowering plant

Echinacea paradoxa, the yellow coneflower, Bush's purple coneflower, or Ozark coneflower, is a North American species of flowering plant in the family Asteraceae. It is native to southern Missouri, Arkansas, and south-central Oklahoma. It is listed as threatened in Arkansas.

== Description ==
Echinacea paradoxa is a perennial herb up to 90 cm (3 ft) tall with multiple, slightly hairy stems arising from the rootstock. Most of the leaves are basal leaves with smooth margins. They are alternate, becoming shorter higher up on the stem, and they are completely absent on the upper two-thirds of the stem. The basal leaves are 8–45 cm (3–18 in) long and narrowly elliptic to lanceolate, and the stem leaves are 4–35 cm (2–14 in) long and linear to narrowly elliptic or narrowly lanceolate.

One plant can produce several flower heads, each with white, pink, or yellow ray florets surrounding a central head of numerous disk florets. Each flower head is about 5–6 cm (2–2.5 in) across. The central head is dome-shaped and dark reddish brown to nearly black. It is prickly to the touch. It blooms in May and June.

== Taxonomy ==
Varieties

- Echinacea paradoxa var. paradoxa - yellow rays - Arkansas and Missouri - yellow coneflower or Ozark coneflower
- Echinacea paradoxa var.neglecta - pink or white rays Oklahoma and Texas - Bush's purple coneflower

Echinacea paradoxa var. paradoxa has a baseline chromosome number of x = 11, like most Echinacea plants.

== Distribution and habitat ==
Echinacea paradoxa var. paradoxa, or yellow coneflower, is endemic to the Ozarks of Missouri and Arkansas. It is listed as imperiled in Arkansas.

Echinacea paradoxa var. neglecta, or Bush's purple coneflower, is currently only known to exist in the wild in the Arbuckle Mountains region of southeastern Oklahoma. One isolated population was reported from Montgomery County in eastern Texas. It is listed as critically imperiled in Oklahoma and presumed extirpated in Texas.

Habitats include partially sunny to sunny savannas, glades, limestone outcroppings, barrens, open hillsides, and bald knobs.

== Gallery ==
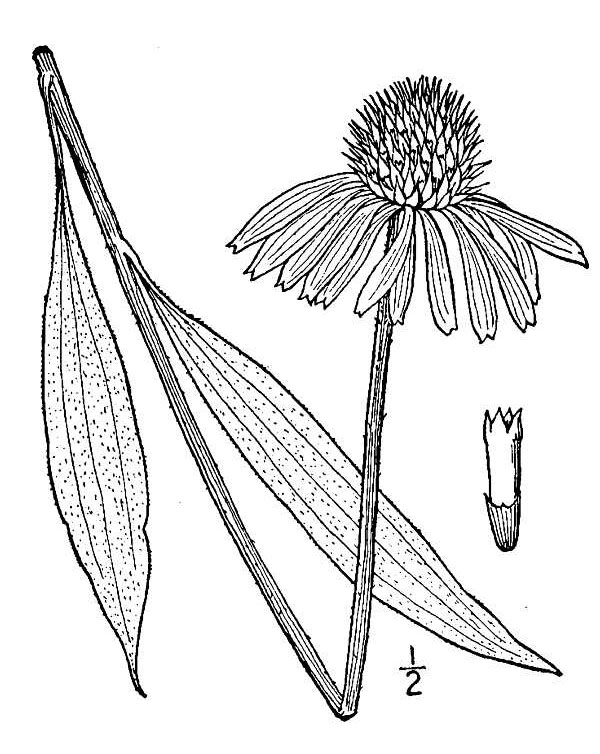
Illustration

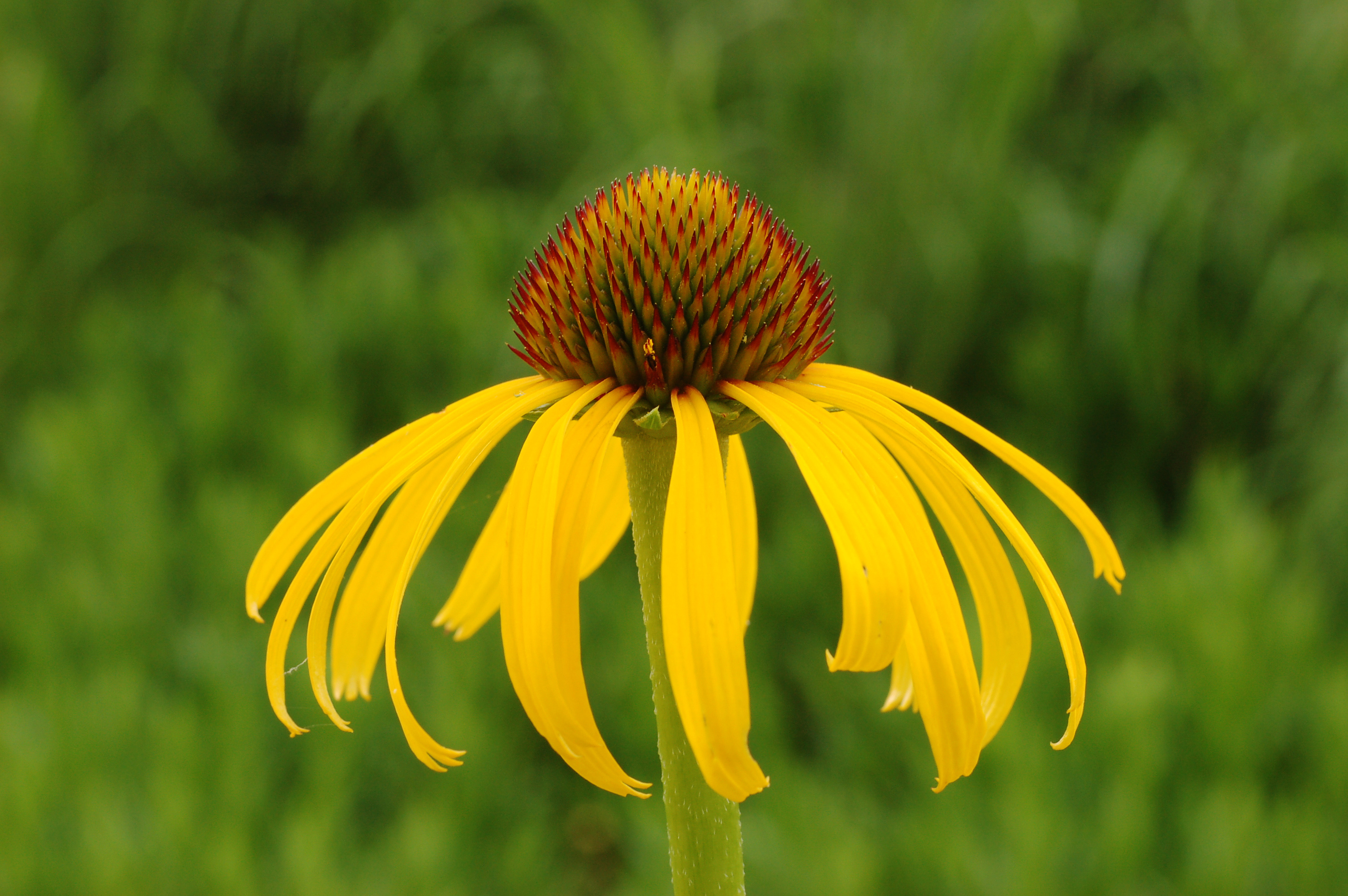
Flower

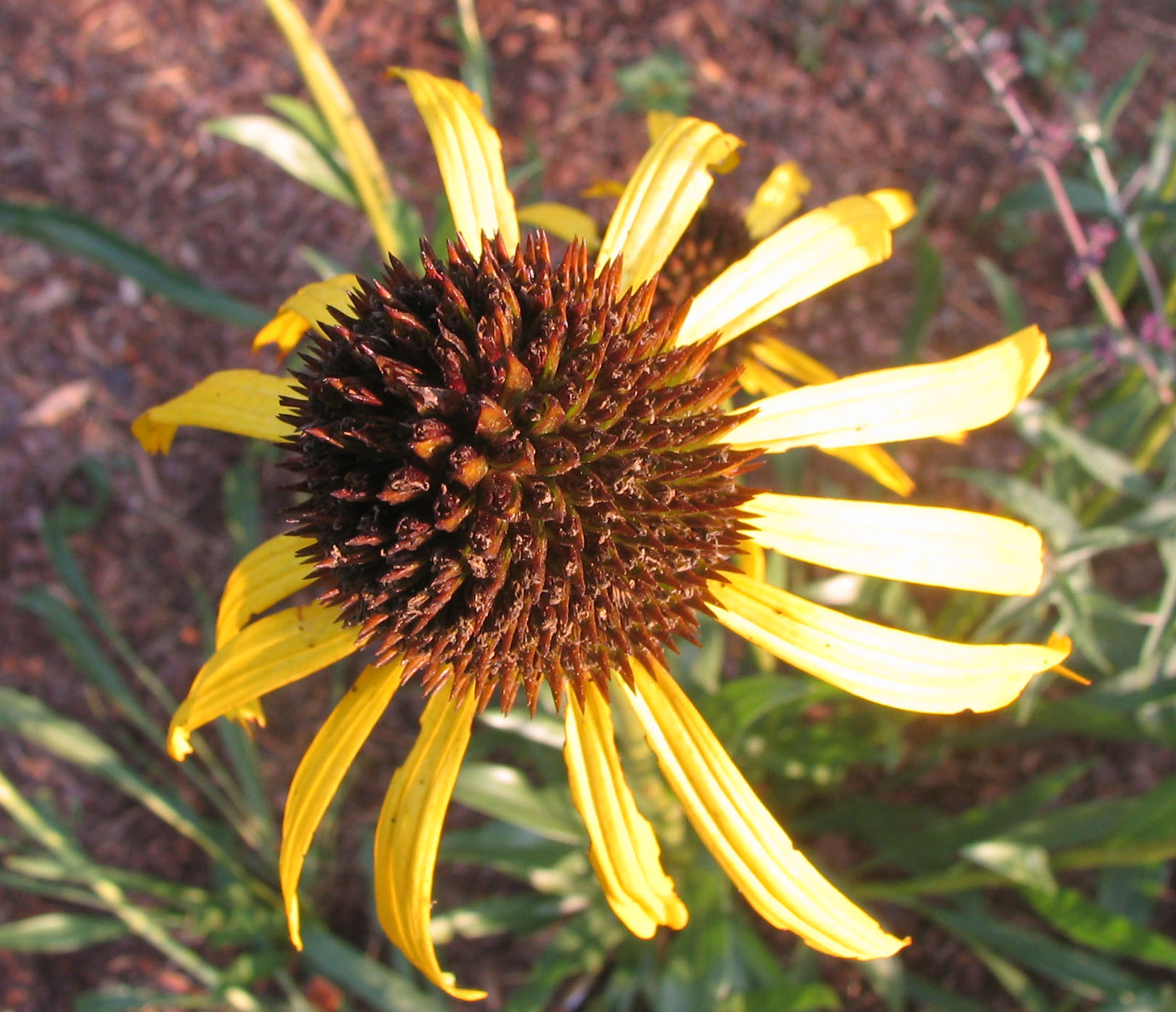
Flower from above

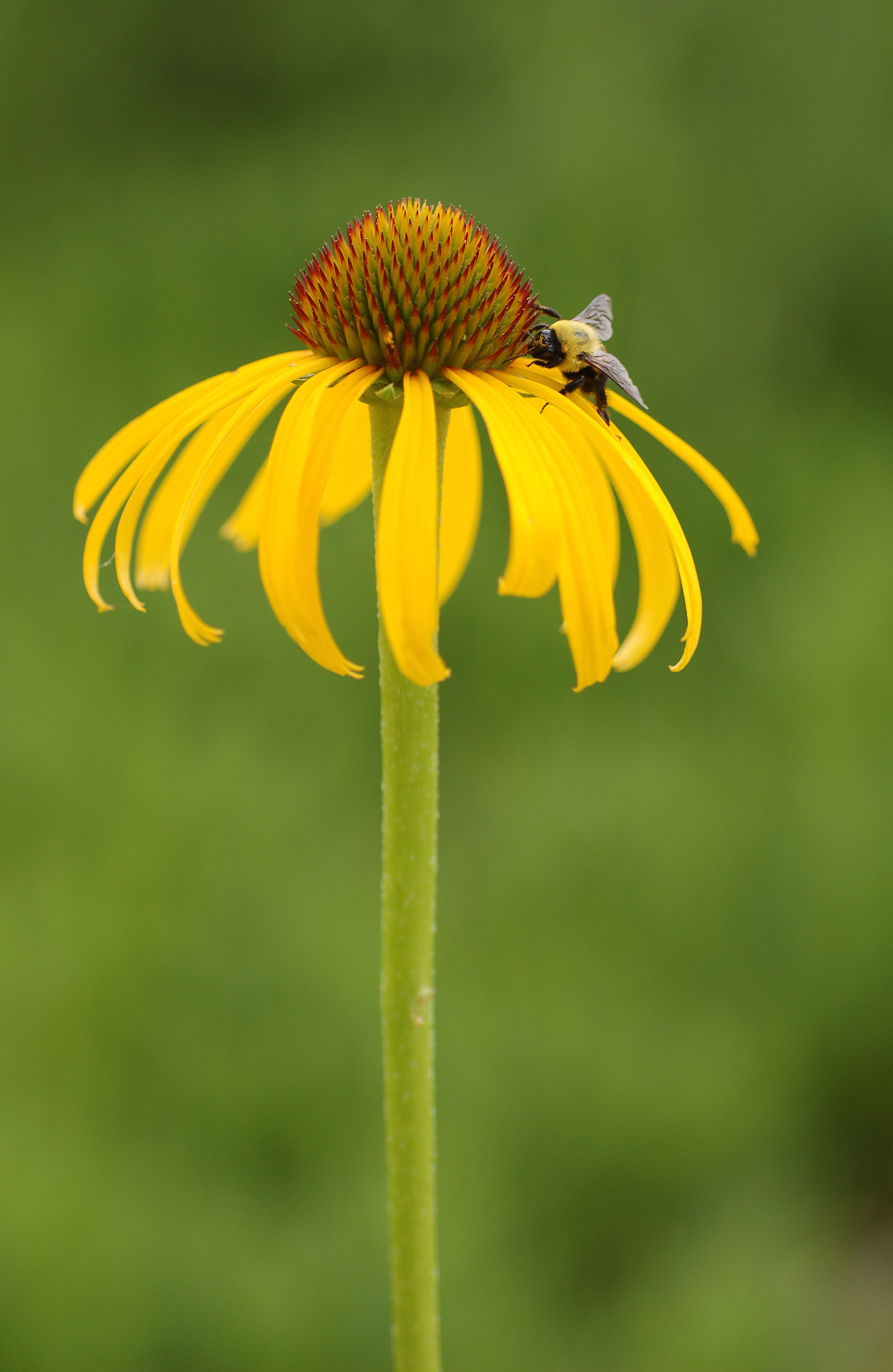
Flower and a bee

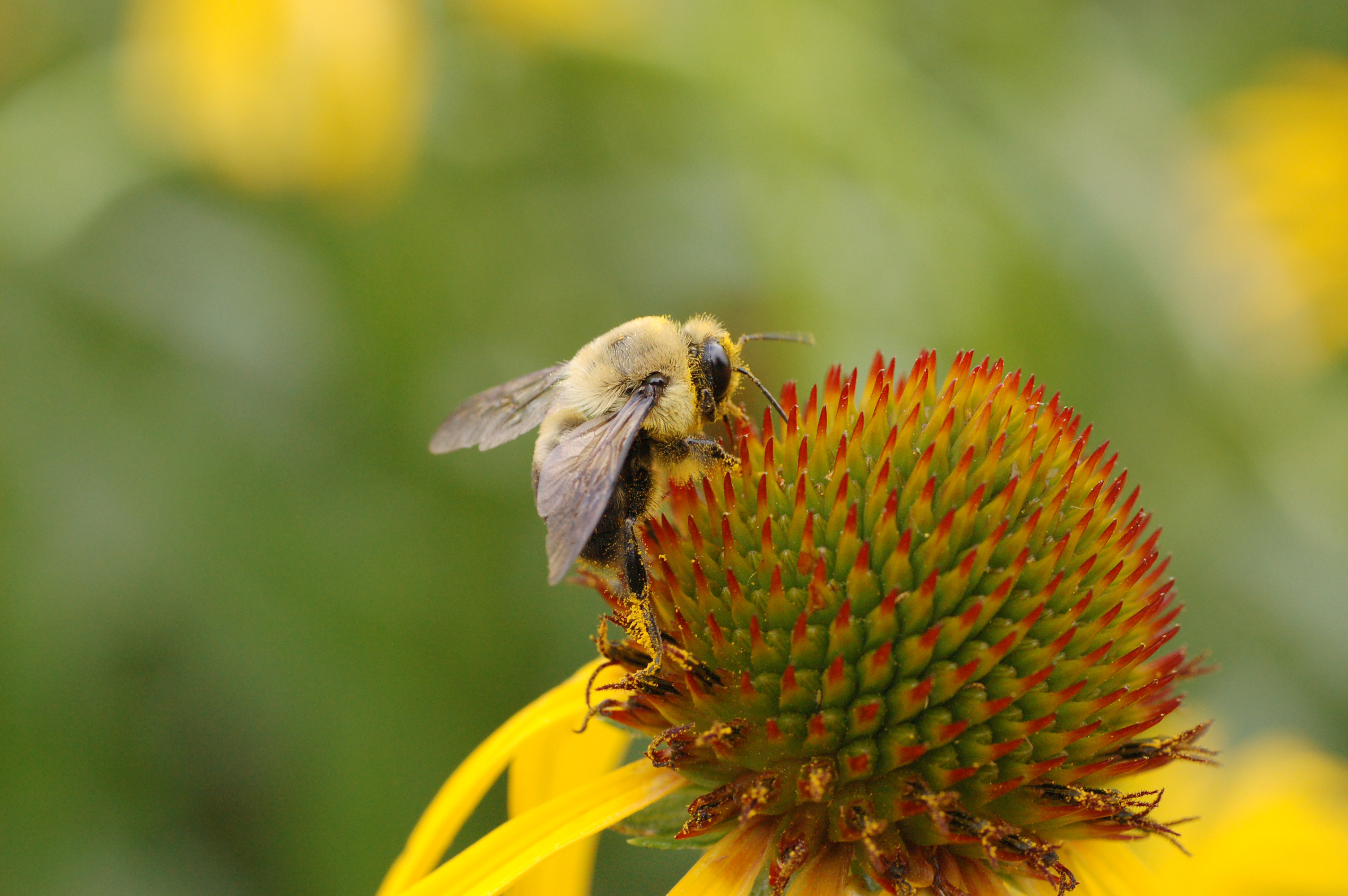
Flower closeup with a bee
