= Echinacea serotina =

Scientific classification
- Kingdom: Plantae
- Clade: Tracheophytes
- Clade: Angiosperms
- Clade: Eudicots
- Clade: Asterids
- Order: Asterales
- Family: Asteraceae
- Genus: Echinacea
- Species: E. serotina

Binomial name
- Echinacea serotina (Nutt.) DC.

Synonyms
- Brauneria serotina (Sweet) Bergmans; Rudbeckia purpurea var. serotina Nutt.; Rudbeckia serotina (Nutt.) Sweet 1823 not Nutt. 1834; Echinacea purpurea var. serotina (Nutt.) L.H.

Species of flowering plant

Echinacea serotina, the narrow-leaved purple coneflower or blacksamson echinacea, is a species of flowering plant in the family Asteraceae. It is native to the states of Arkansas and Louisiana in the United States. The species is sometimes listed as being found only in Louisiana, but the type collection was made in Arkansas, part of Louisiana at the time.

Echinacea serotina is very similar to E. purpurea but with stiffer, bristly hairs on the foliage.
