= Pharmaceutical Biology =

- Discipline: Pharmaceutical science
- Language: English
- Edited by: John M. Pezzuto

Publication details
- History: 1961-present
- Publisher: Taylor & Francis
- Frequency: Monthly
- Impact factor: 2.971 (2019)

Standard abbreviations
- ISO 4: Pharm. Biol.

Indexing
- CODEN: PHBIFC
- ISSN: 1388-0209 (print); 1744-5116 (web)
- LCCN: sn98030858
- OCLC no.: 637673973

Links
- Journal homepage; Online access; Online archive

Pharmaceutical Biology is a monthly peer-reviewed medical journal that publishes research on natural product research related to pharmaceutical biology. The editor-in-chief is John M. Pezzuto (Western New England University).
