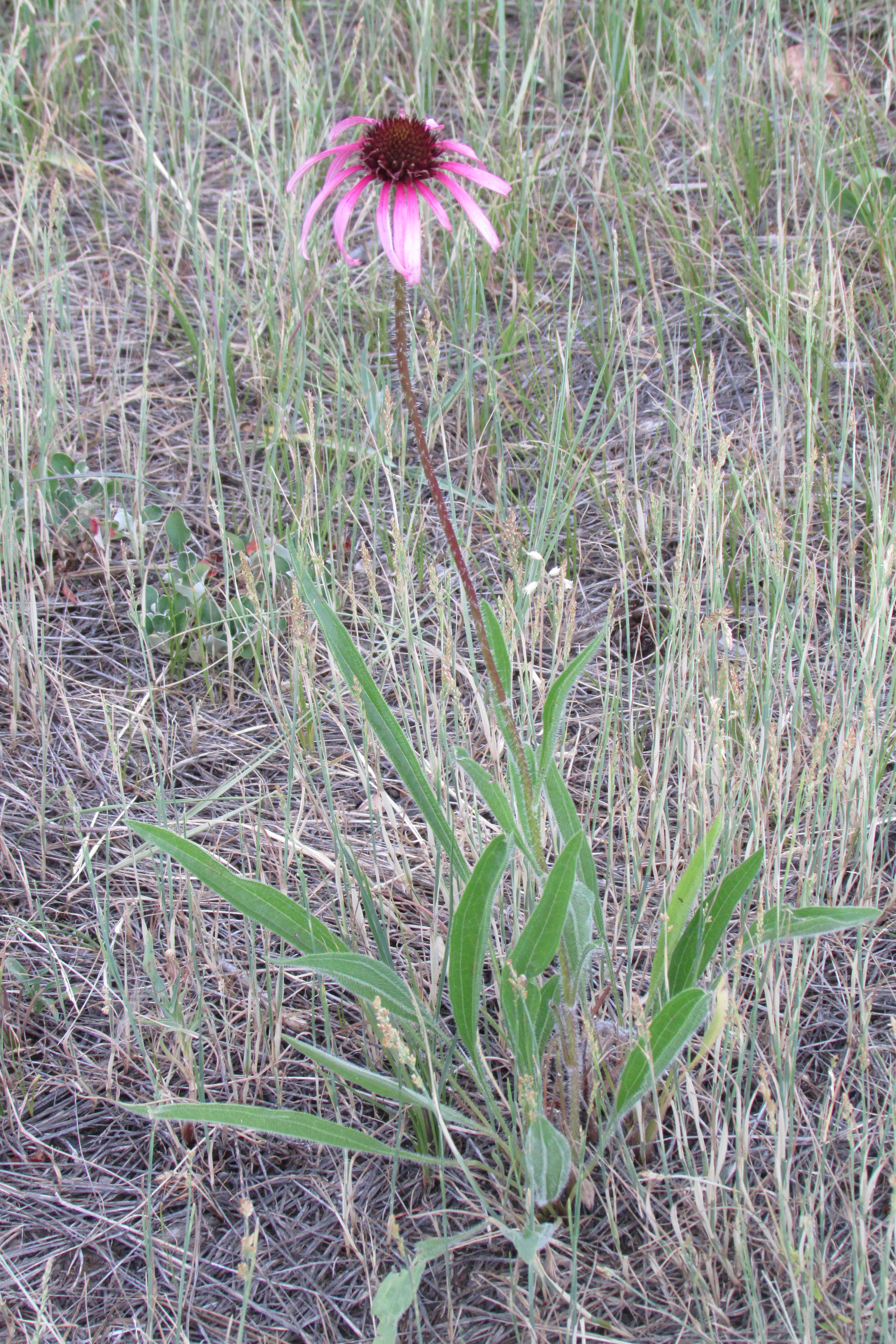

Conservation status
- Apparently Secure (NatureServe)

Scientific classification
- Kingdom: Plantae
- Clade: Tracheophytes
- Clade: Angiosperms
- Clade: Eudicots
- Clade: Asterids
- Order: Asterales
- Family: Asteraceae
- Tribe: Heliantheae
- Genus: Echinacea
- Species: E. angustifolia

Binomial name
- Echinacea angustifolia DC.

Synonyms
- Brauneria angustifolia (DC.) A.Heller; Echinacea pallida var. angustifolia (DC.) Cronquist; Echinacea angustifolia var. strigosa McGregor

= Echinacea angustifolia =

Species of flowering plant

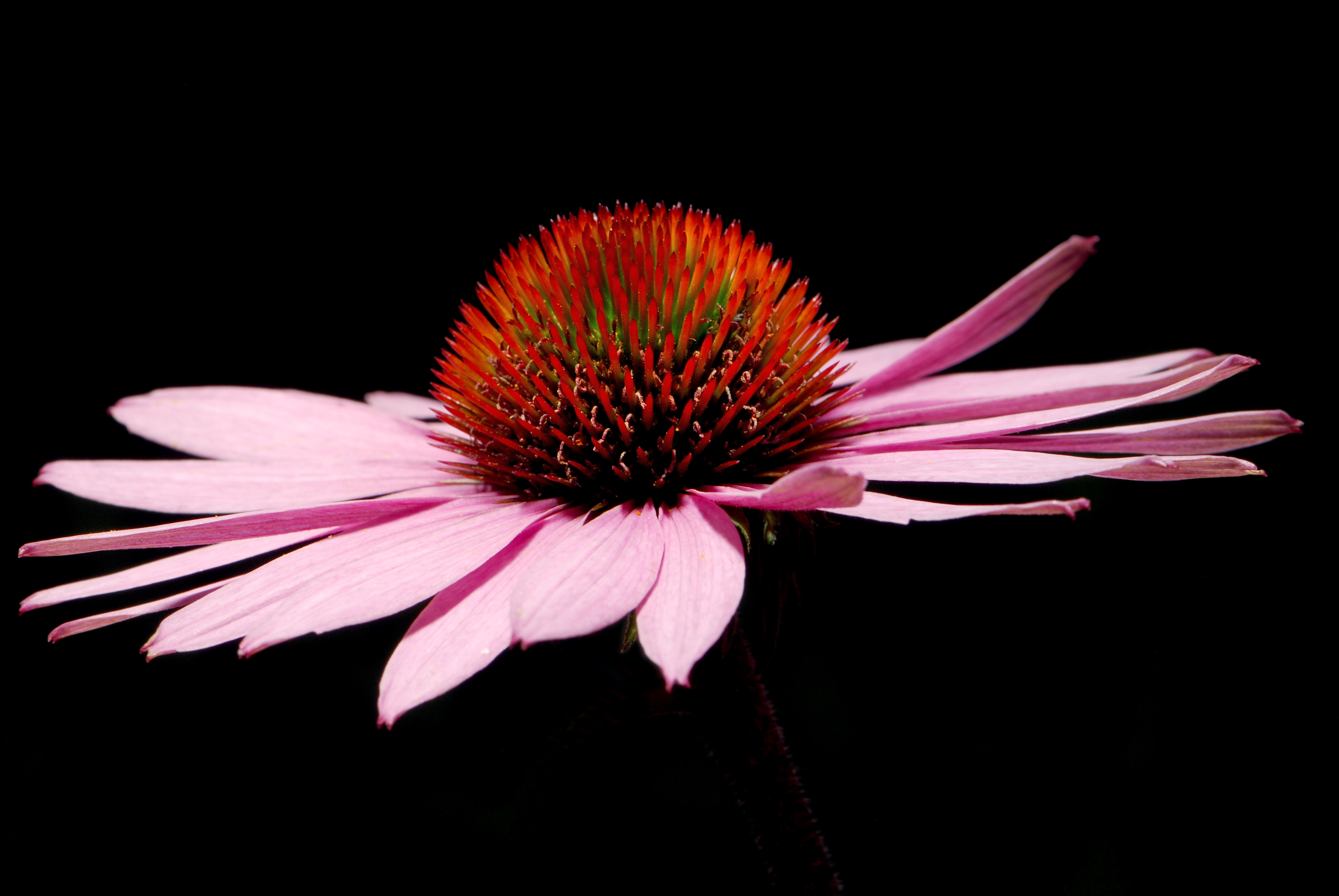
Echinacea angustifolia

Echinacea angustifolia, the narrow-leaved purple coneflower or blacksamson echinacea, is a species of flowering plant in the family Asteraceae. It is native to North America, where it is widespread across much of the Great Plains of central Canada and the central United States, with additional populations in surrounding regions.

E. angustifolia is a perennial herb with spindle-shaped taproots that are often branched. The stems and leaves are moderately to densely hairy. The plant produces flower heads each at the end of a long peduncle. Each flower head contains 8–21 pink or purple ray florets plus 80–250 orange disc florets.

Echinacea angustifolia blooms in late spring to mid-summer. Two subspecies are used by some botanists, but are regarded as illegitimate by Flora of North America (FNA) and Plants of the World Online (POWO):

- Echinacea angustifolia subsp. angustifolia is native to central Canada and the central United States from Saskatchewan and Manitoba in the north to New Mexico, Texas, and Louisiana in the south.
- Echinacea angustifolia subsp. strigosa has a more limited range in Kansas, Oklahoma, Texas, and Louisiana.

== Morphology ==
The word "Echinacea" is derived from the Greek word "echinos" which means sea urchin or hedgehog; a feature that can be observed in the flower head of the plant.

Echinacea angustifolia is about 10–50 cm in length.

The plant consists of white to pink or deep purple flower petals that characteristically wilt downwards, while the ray florets of the flower head range from green to red-brown in color. The leaves are dark green and can be oblong-lanceolate or elliptical in shape. The plant has pubescent stems with rhizomes present underground.

== Reproduction and life cycle ==
The plant does not self pollinate and requires assistance from bee pollinators in the reproduction process. In Echinacea angustifolia there is greater success in pollination between mates that are at a closer proximity between one another. Echinacea angustifolia is an herbaceous perennial plant, producing flowers and living more than two years at a time. The plant is known to grow at a slow rate and is drought-resistant to help the plant survive in its temperate grassland habitat.

== Chemistry ==
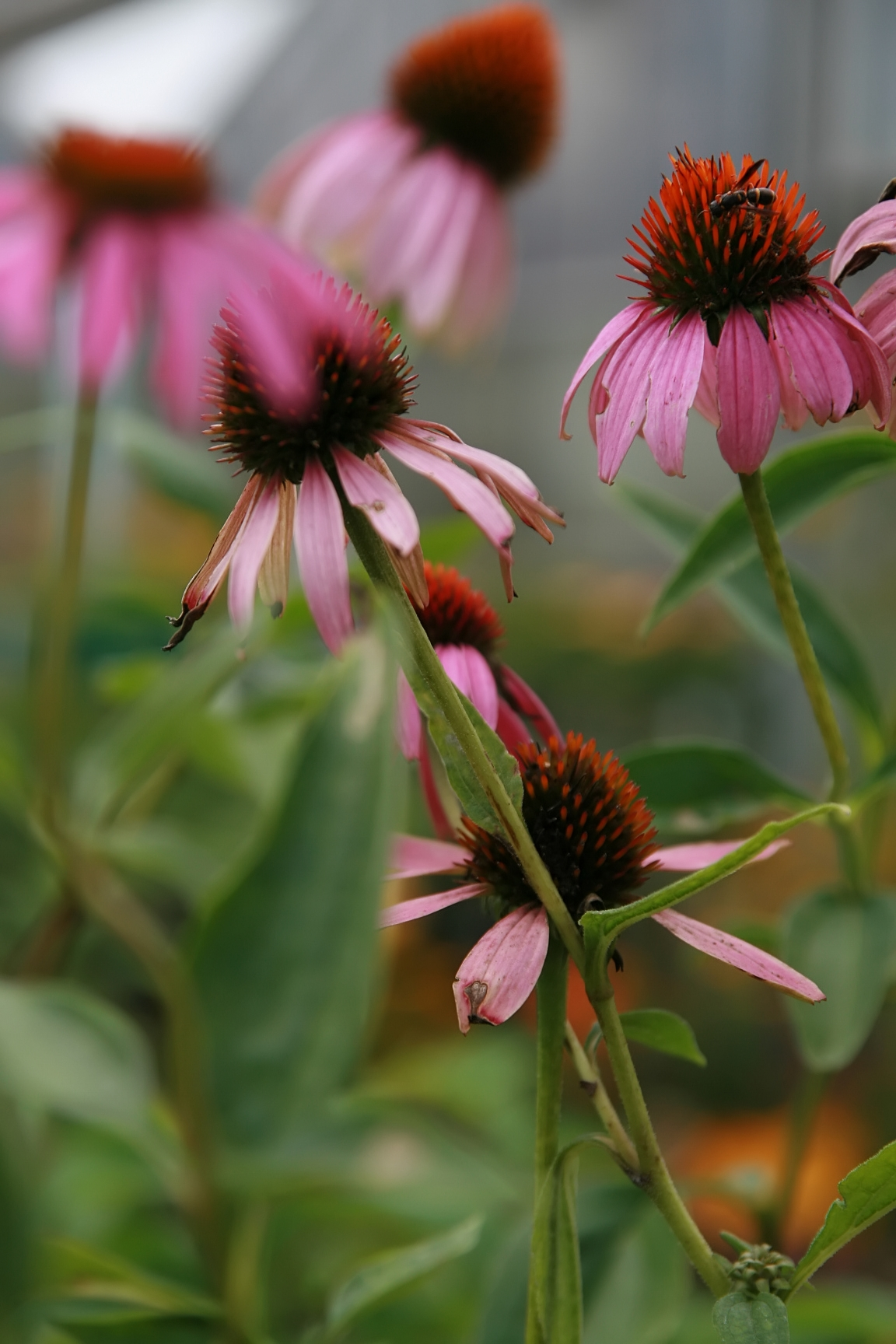
Echinacea angustifolia

Greater root density is observed in Echinacea angustifolia growing in higher latitude, in turn, producing a greater quantity of polyphenols and alkylamides available in the root extract.

Although it is used in herbal medicine there is mixed consensus that it is effective or safe for treating disease.

== Range and habitat ==
Echinacea angustifolia grows in the drier parts of the tallgrass prairie, the mixed grass prairie, and the shortgrass prairie in North America, in a range of soils from rocky to sandy-clay. It is recorded by the USDA Natural Resources Conservation Service PLANTS database (PLANTS) as growing in Colorado, Iowa, Kansas, Louisiana, Manitoba, Minnesota, Missouri, Montana, Nebraska, New Mexico, New York, North Dakota, Oklahoma, Saskatchewan, South Dakota, Texas, Wyoming. The FNA largely agrees with this, but do not record it in New York and PLANTS only records it in Monroe County, NY.

== Cultivation ==
The wildflower gardening author Claude A. Barr regarded narrow-leaved purple coneflower as, "bold, spectacular, and beautiful." Though he did disagree with the common name, pointing out that it is more pink than purple in most cases. Though gravelly or stony soil is a preference of the plant in the wild, they survive in normal garden soil provided they are not crowded by other plants. Most often it is propagated by seed, but can also be grown from around 10 centimeter sections of taproot from younger plants. They are set upright under 2–3 centimeters of soil with controlled moisture to start new root and top growth.
