= Advances in Therapy =

- Discipline: Pharmacotherapy
- Language: English
- Edited by: Clare Shepherd (managing)

Publication details
- History: 1984-present
- Publisher: Springer Science+Business Media
- Frequency: Monthly
- Impact factor: 3.847 (2020)

Standard abbreviations
- ISO 4: Adv. Ther.

Indexing
- ISSN: 0741-238X (print); 1865-8652 (web)
- OCLC no.: 10113075

Links
- Journal homepage; Online access

Advances in Therapy is a monthly peer-reviewed medical journal covering clinical medicine, especially research on pharmaceuticals. The Managing Editor is Clare Shepherd. The journal publishes original clinical research papers and review articles. The journal was established in 1984 and published by Health Communications. Since 2008 it has been published by Springer Science+Business Media.

== Abstracting and indexing ==
The journal is abstracted and indexed in CINAHL, Current Contents/Clinical Medicine, EMBASE, International Pharmaceutical Abstracts, PsycINFO, PubMed/MEDLINE, Science Citation Index, and Scopus. According to the Journal Citation Reports, the journal has a 2020 impact factor of 3.847.
