= Interior Low Plateaus =

Physiographic region in eastern United States

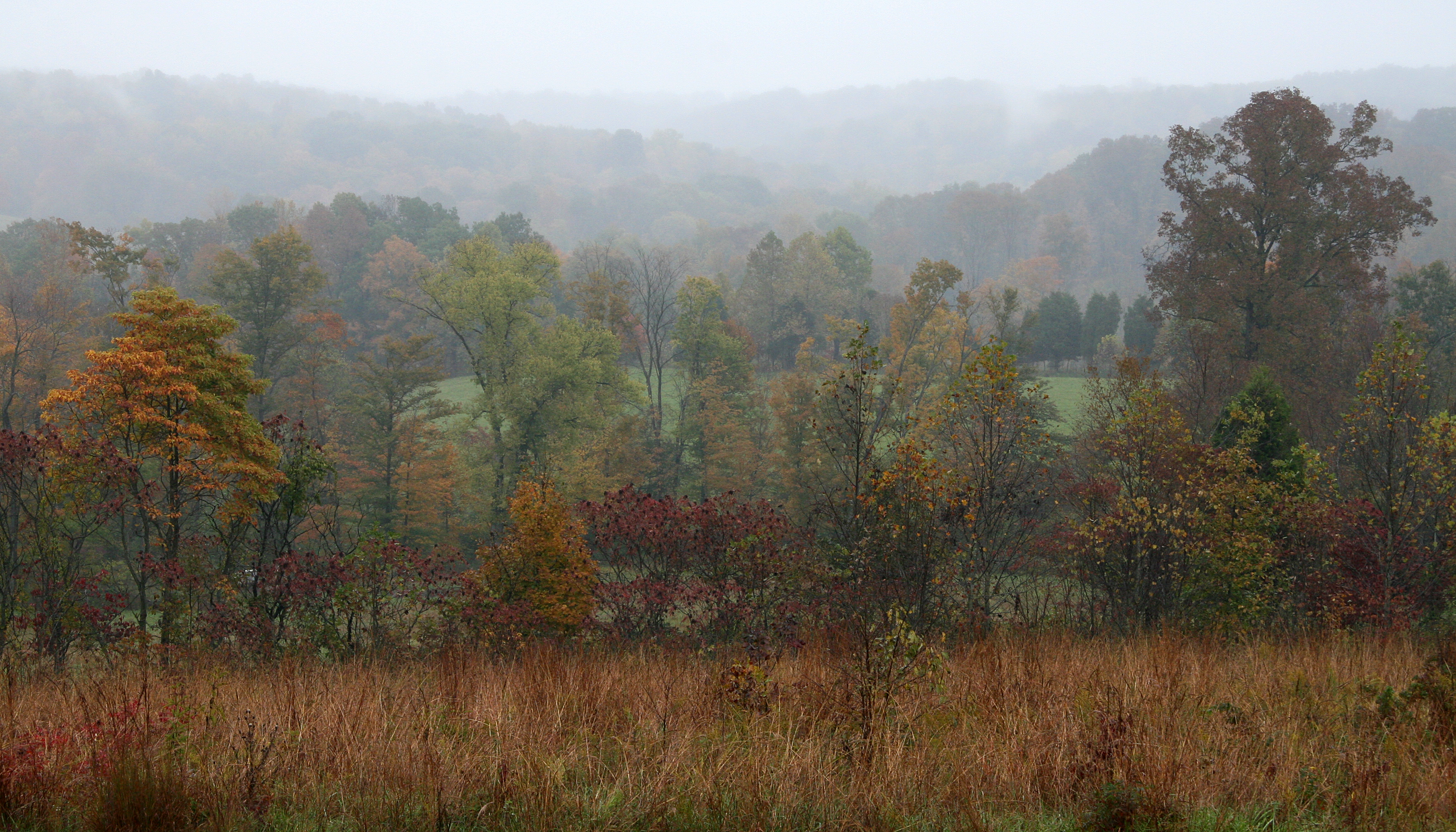
- Hoosier National Forest

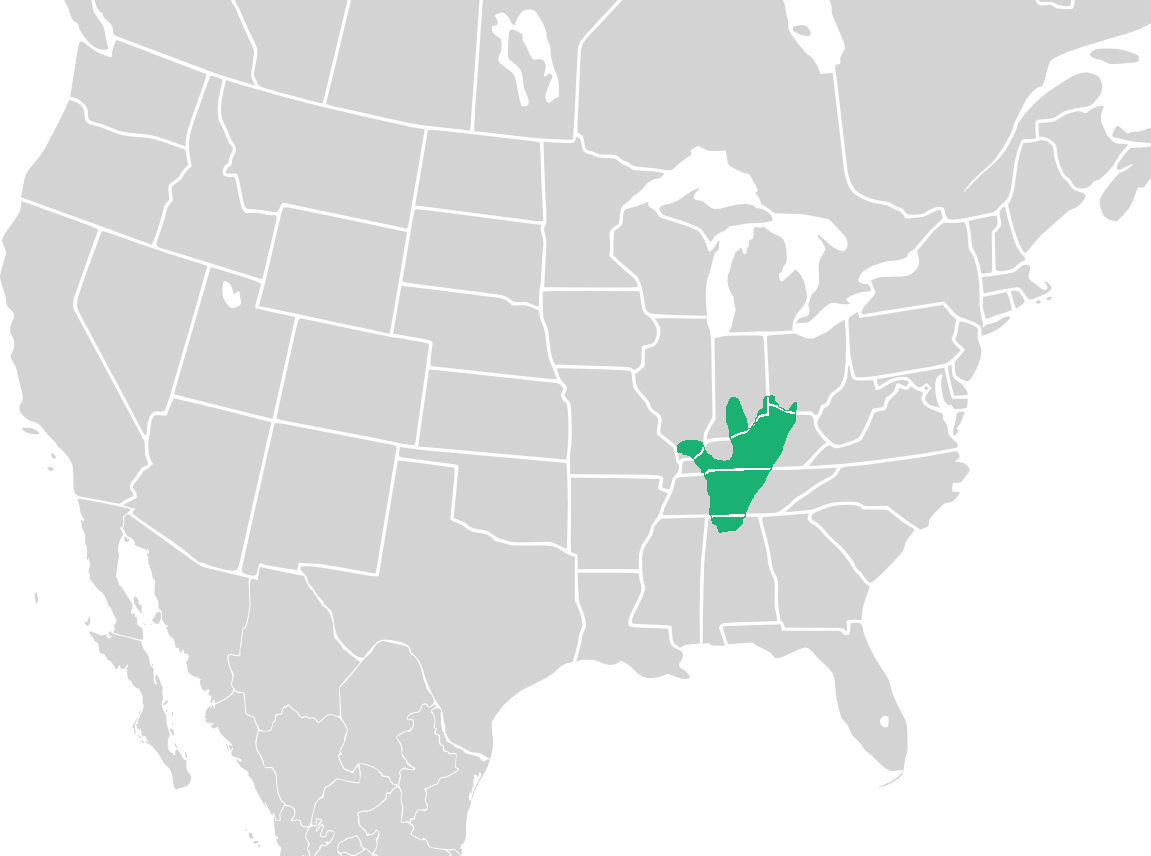

Ecology
- Biome: Temperate broadleaf and mixed forests
- Borders: List: Central forest-grasslands transition; Southern Great Lakes forests; Appalachian mixed mesophytic forests; Southeastern mixed forests; Mississippi lowland forests; Ozark Mountain forests
- Bird species: 203
- Mammal species: 69

Geography
- Area: 296,000 km^{2} (114,000 mi^{2})
- Country: United States
- States: List: Missouri; Illinois; Indiana; Ohio; Kentucky; Tennessee; Mississippi; Alabama; Arkansas; Oklahoma

Conservation
- Habitat loss: 46.522%
- Protected: 7.01%

The Interior Low Plateaus are a physiographic region in eastern United States. It consists of a diverse landscape that extends from north Alabama across central Tennessee and Kentucky into southern Illinois, Indiana, and Ohio. Its natural communities are a matrix of temperate forests, woodlands, and prairies.

== Setting ==
This is a region of rolling plains and eroded plateaus, with a humid subtropical climate in the south and humid continental climate in the north. It is notable for its extensive karst limestone, which comprise the caves at Mammoth Cave National Park. This region includes a portion of what the U.S. Forest service calls the "Central Hardwood Forest".

The region extends from southern Ohio, Indiana and Illinois through Tennessee and central Kentucky and into northern Alabama. Nearly 65% of Kentucky's territory is within the Interior Low Plateaus region, which encompasses an area from the western Appalachian Plateaus to the Tennessee River. It includes the Kentucky Bluegrass and Knobs regions, the Highland Rim and the Shawnee Hills.

== Geology ==
The underlying bedrock of the Interior Low Plateaus consists of sedimentary rocks such as limestone, sandstone, and shale. These date from the Ordovician period in the Nashville Basin and Bluegrass region, up to the Carboniferous Period in the Shawnee Hills. The Interior Low Plateaus lie at the southern edge of the glacial boundary. Unlike the till plain to the north, the underlying bedrock is generally close to the surface, and the topography of an area depends on how resistant the underlying bedrock is to erosion. More resistant sandstones have resulted in hillier areas such as the Norman Upland and Crawford Upland in Southern Indiana, while softer limestones have already eroded down to gently rolling plains, like the Scottsburg Lowlands and Wabash Lowlands of southeast and southwest Indiana. The hillier parts of the Interior Low Plateaus are not mountain ranges, but dissected plateaus.

== Natural Communities ==
The natural communities in this region are a matrix of forest, woodlands, and prairie. Today, much of the open prairie and savanna communities have been lost due to fire suppression and agriculture. However, oak-hickory woodlands remain relatively common, and mesic forest is abundant along riparian areas.

=== Woodlands ===
Oak-hickory woodland is the most common natural community in the Interior Low Plateaus. It is the dominant natural community for many areas of rolling hills, including the Western Highland Rim, Shawnee Hills, and Outer Bluegrass. These woodlands represent an intermediate state between a forest and a savanna.

Common trees in this community include post oak (Quercus stellata), white oak (Quercus alba), southern red oak (Quercus falcata), black oak (Quercus velutina), and pignut hickory (Carya glabra). In more calcareous areas, common woodland trees include Shumard oak (Quercus shumardii), Chinquapin oak (Quercus muhlenbergii), and Carolina shagbark (Carya carolinae-septentrionalis). In more acidic dry woodlands there are stands of chestnut oak (Quercus montana) and Virginia pine (Pinus virginiana). In swampy fragipan flats, woodlands consist of willow oak (Quercus phellos), overcup oak (Quercus lyrata), pin oak (Quercus palustris), sweetgum (Liquidambar styraciflua), and blackgum (Nyssa sylvatica). The woodlands in this region contain a rich sun-loving herbaceous layer, with many species of goldenrod (Solidago), sunflower (Helianthus), and aster (Symphyotrichum).

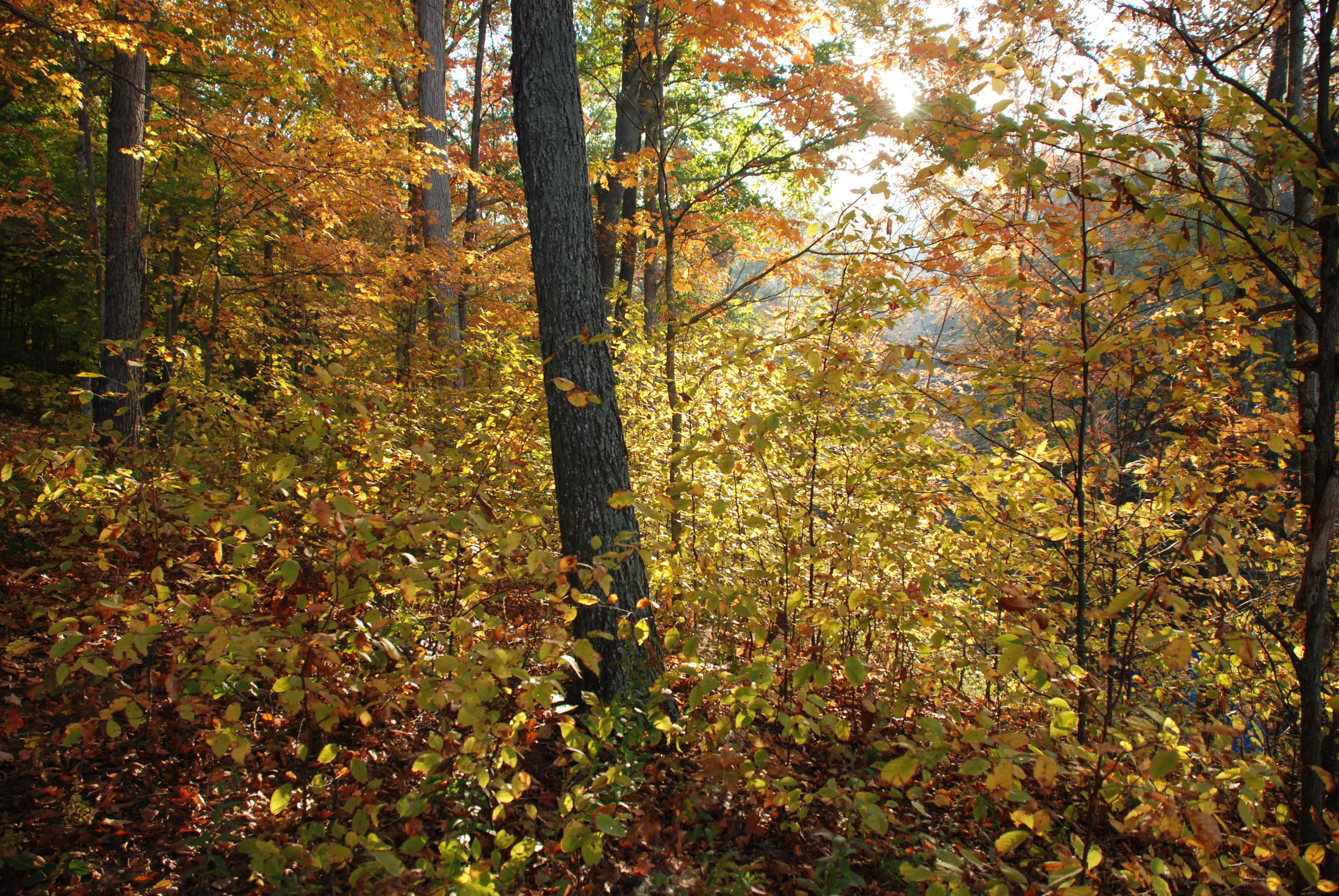
Oak-hickory woodland in the Hoosier National Forest, Indiana

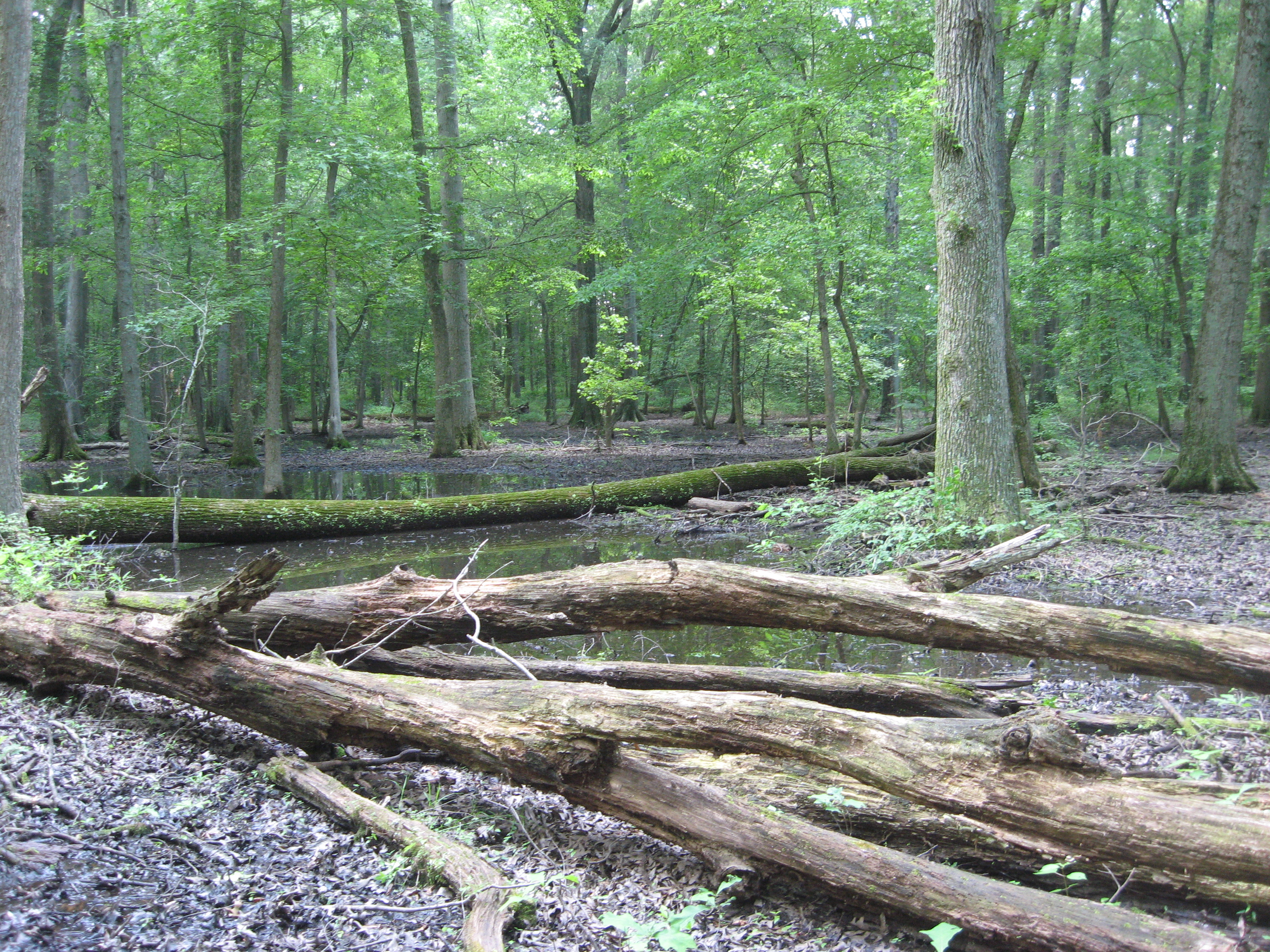
Wet oak flatwoods in the Pennyroyal Plain, Tennessee

=== Prairie and Savanna ===
The flat surfaces of the Interior Low Plateaus historically contained extensive areas of open prairie. This community was concentrated in the areas of the Mitchell Plain and Pennyroyal Plain with smaller areas of prairie in the Nashville Basin and Highland Rim. Early settlers describe these areas as nearly treeless expanses, containing Greater prairie chicken and herds of Bison. Today, some prairie remains in areas that are managed by controlled burns, or other forms of tree removal such as powerline and roadside clearings.

Dry prairies are the most common remnant in this region, due to their unsuitability for agriculture and resistance to succession. They are dominated by Schizachyrium scoparium (little bluestem) and Aristida purpurascens (three-awn grass). Mesic prairies are rarer, and are dominated by very tall grasses such as Indian grass (Sorghastrum nutans), big bluestem (Andropogon gerardi), and plume grass (Erianthus alopecuroides). Wet prairies are the rarest and most poorly-documented grassland type in this region. The few existing remnants have species such as gamagrass (Tripsacum dactyloides), prairie cordgrass (Spartina pectinata), and many rushes (Juncus) and sedges (Carex). Significant prairie remnants now remain at Ft. Campbell and Arnold Air Force Base, as well as in a few small nature preserves. Blackjack oak (Quercus marilandica) was reportedly one of the few trees that could occasionally survive the annual wildfires in the prairies.

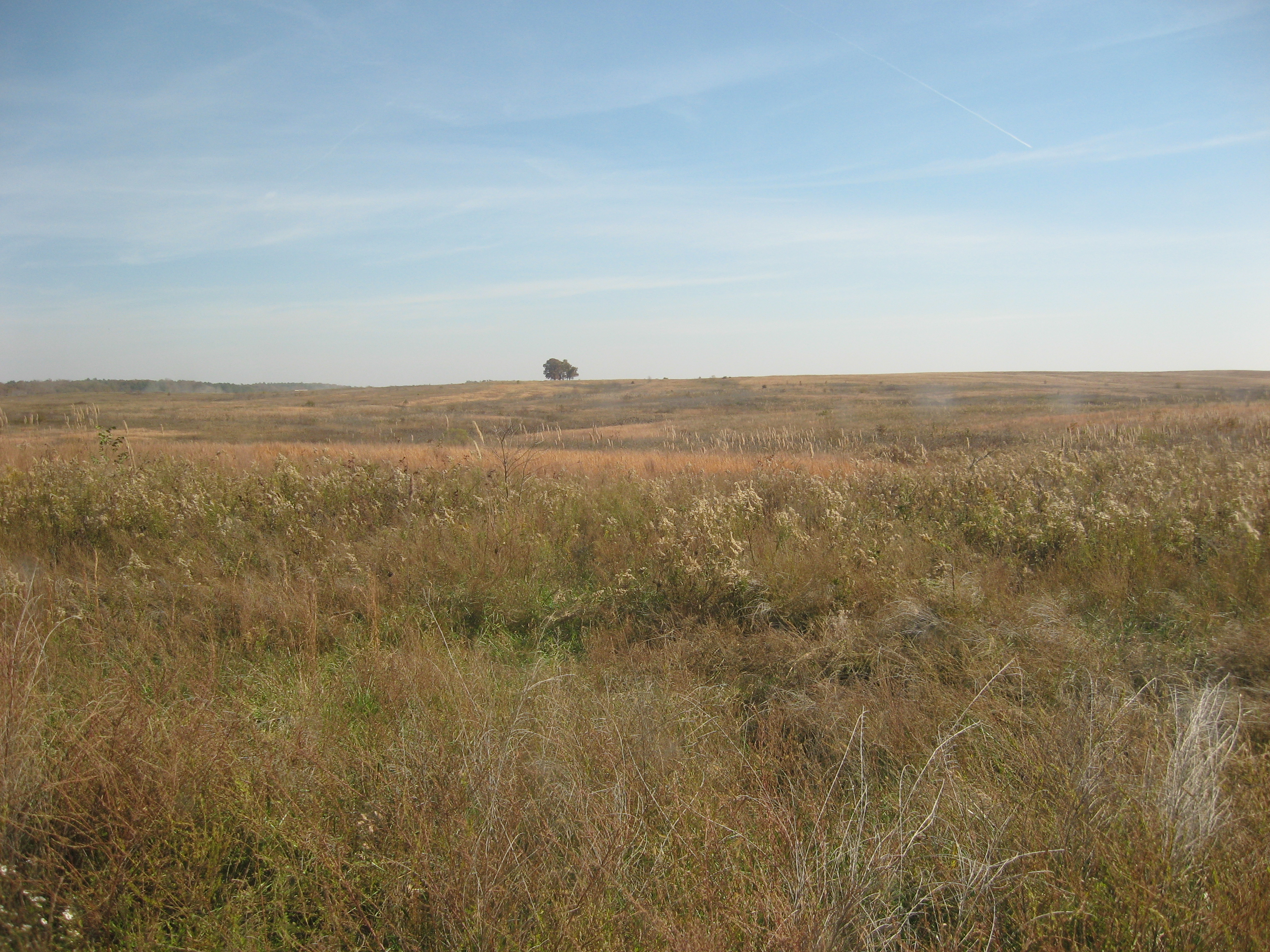
Mesic prairie remnant in the Pennyroyal Plain, Tennessee

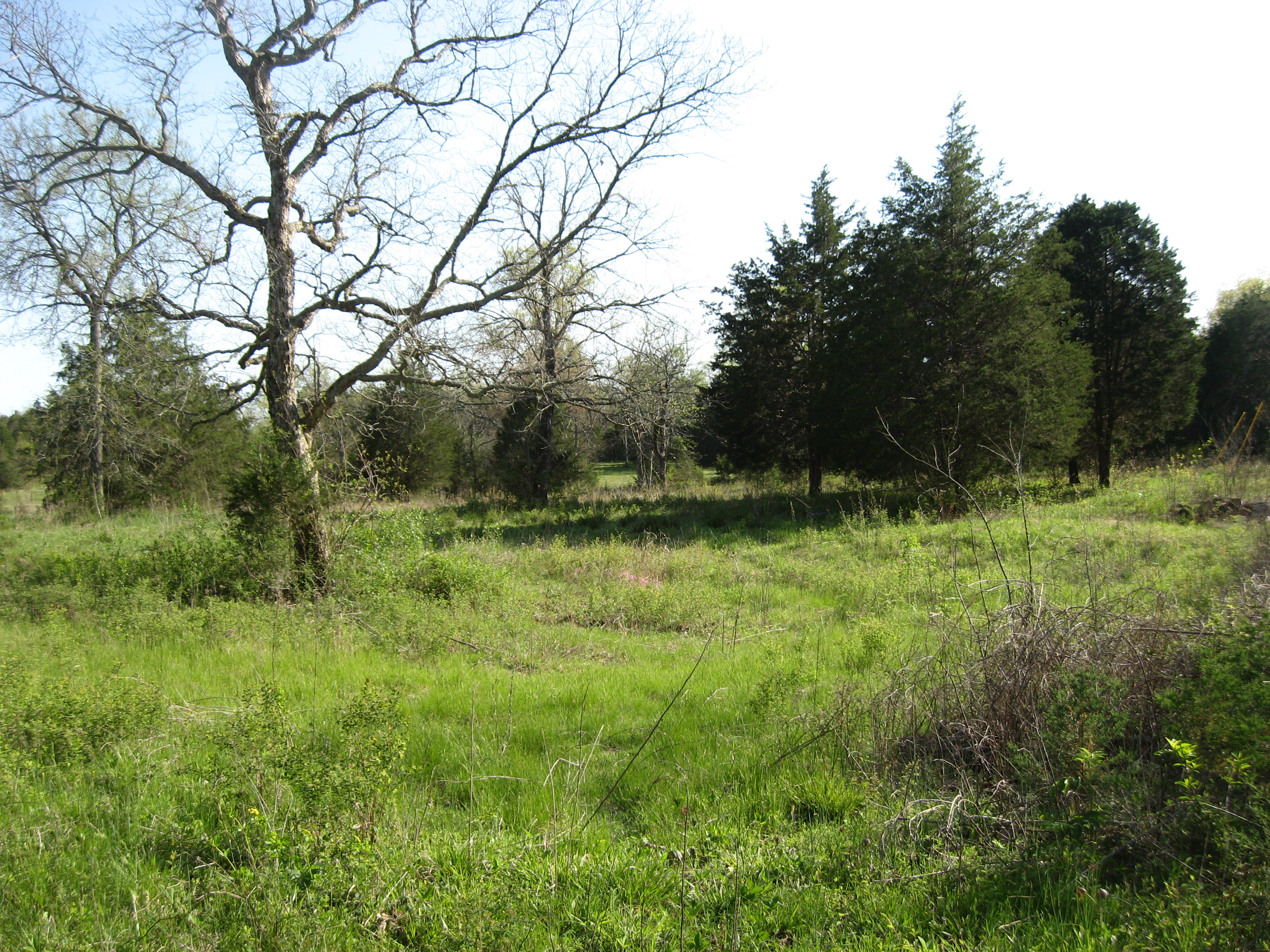
Dry oak savanna in the Inner Nashville Basin, Tennessee

=== Forests ===
Closed-canopy forests in this region are also naturally found in many areas, such as riparian zones, river bottoms, and dissected terrain.

Mesic forests are often found in narrow stream gorges. These forests have a particularly rich diversity in spring wildflowers. They are dominated by sugar maple (Acer saccharum), beech (Fagus grandifolia), basswood (Tilia americana), northern red oak (Quercus rubra), and tuliptree (Liriodendron tulipifera). In the Eastern Highland Rim, at the edge of the Cumberland Plateau, these forests develop a more Appalachian character, and contain species such as eastern hemlock (Tsuga canadensis), yellow buckeye (Aesculus flava), and cucumber magnolia (Magnolia tripetala). Acidic sandstone cove forests in the Shawnee Hills also contain more typically Appalachian species such as yellow birch (Betula alleghaniensis) and umbrella magnolia (Magnolia tripetala).

Floodplain forests in the Interior Low Plateau remain relatively common, although many areas have been converted to agriculture. These forests are dominated by sugarberry (Celtis laevigata), boxelder (Acer negundo), silver maple (Acer saccharinum), and sycamore (Platanus occidentalis).

Forests were particularly common in the uplands of the Inner Bluegrass region of Kentucky, which has naturally mesic conditions. These forests were dominated by sugar maple (Acer saccharum), bitternut hickory (Carya cordiformis), Ohio buckleye (Aesculus glabra), blue ash (Fraxinus quadrangulata), and chinquapin oak (Quercus muhlenbergii). This community is now quite rare in the Inner Bluegrass due to logging by early European settlers. Its destruction was so rapid and complete, that mid-20th century ecologists mistook the successional state of the Bluegrass as its natural condition. Sun-loving species such as hackberry (Celtis occidentalis), black cherry (Prunus serotina), black walnut (Juglans nigra), and white ash (Fraxinus americana) now dominate much of the Bluegrass region.

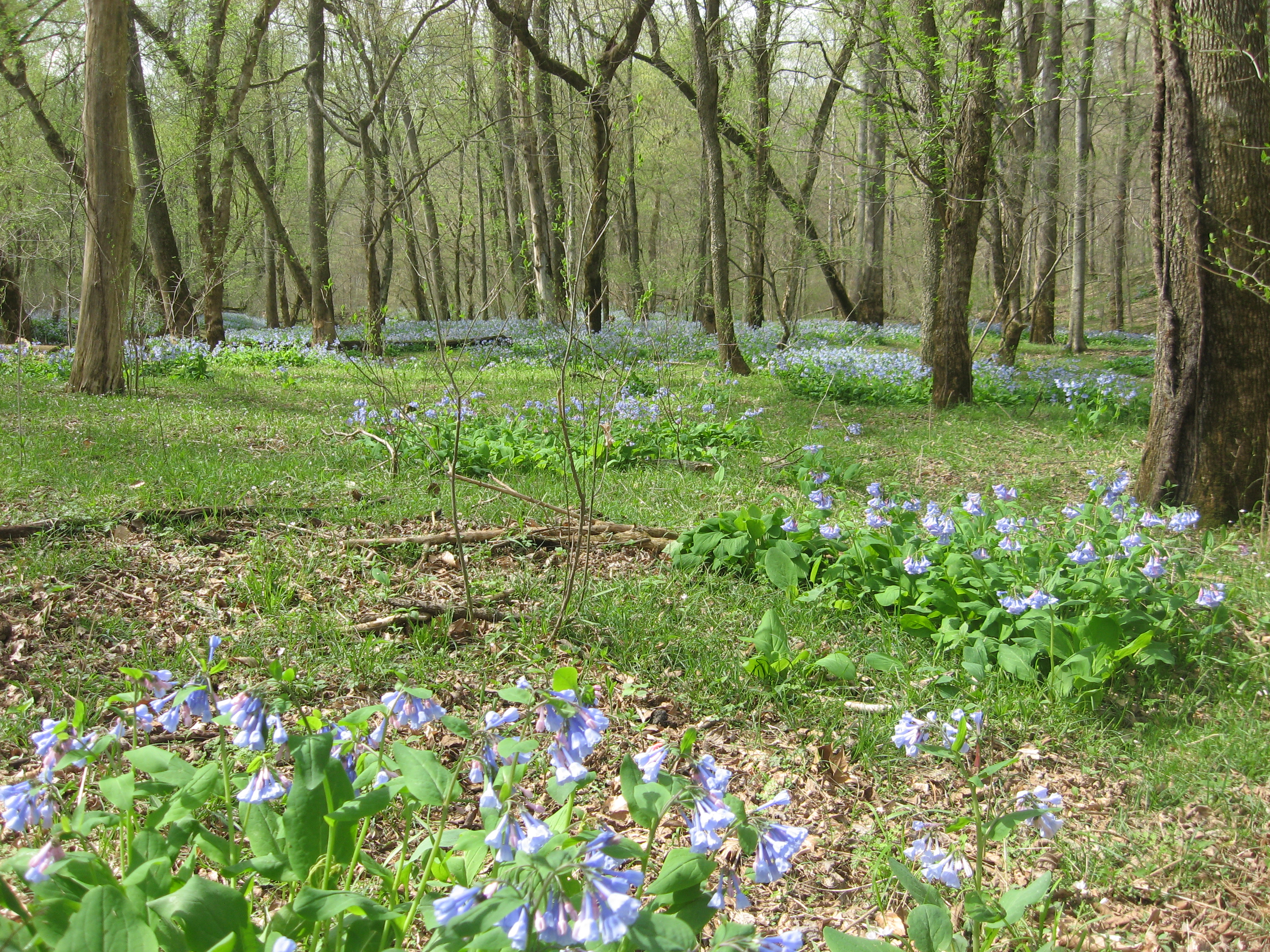
Bottomland forest in the Pennyroyal Plain, Kentucky

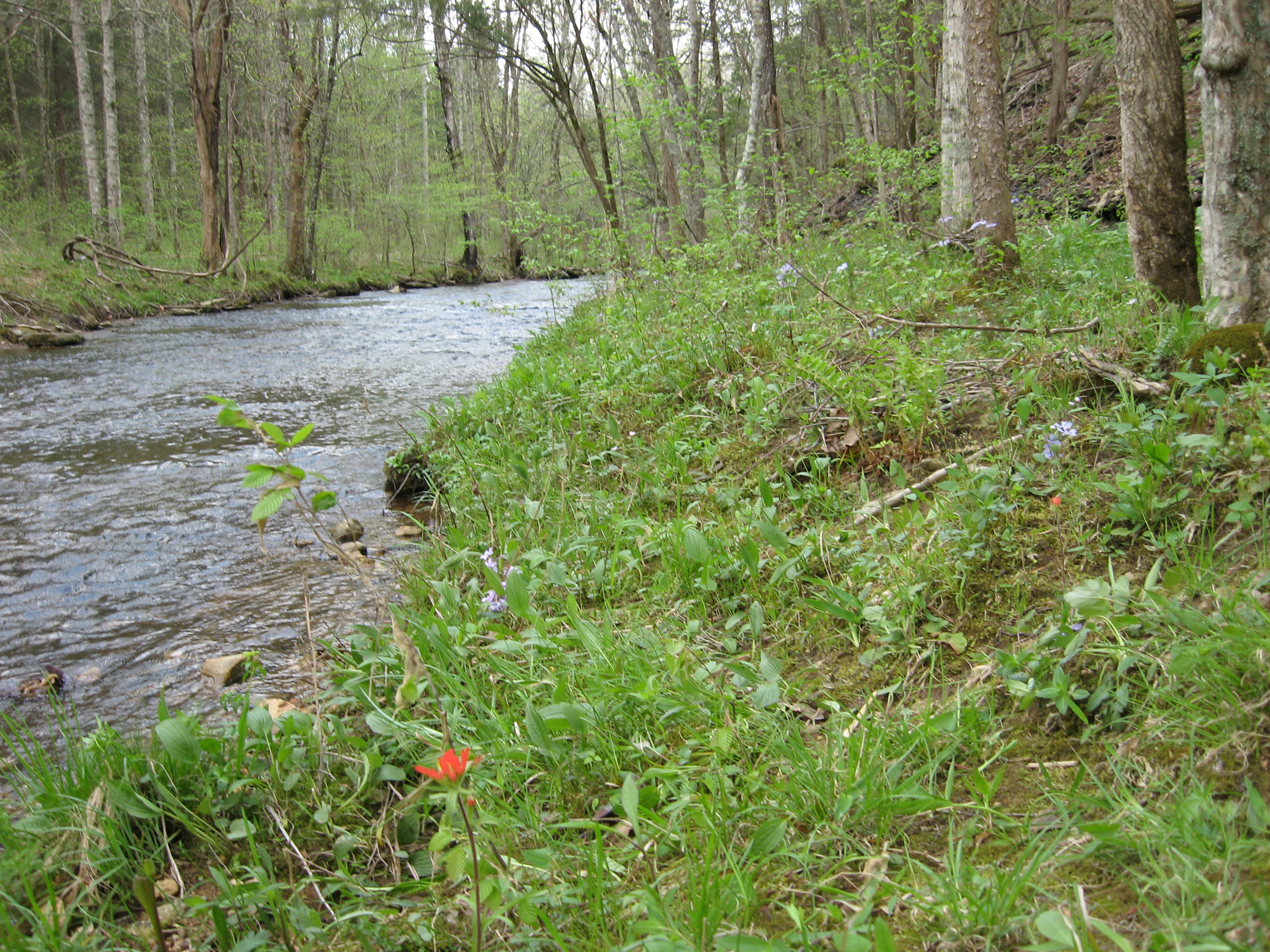
Calcareous riparian forest in the Western Highland Rim, Tennessee

=== Barrens and Glades ===
Barrens are open treeless areas on slopes, often with shallow soil. These are found sporadically in the Outer Bluegrass, Inner Nashville Basin, Shawnee Hills, and in parts of the Highland Rim. It is unclear whether these communities rely on fire for their openness, or are maintained by soil conditions alone. They are usually dominated by short grasses such as little bluestem (Schizachyrium scoparium), and large showy forbs such as prairie dock (Silphium terebinthinaceum) and blazing star (Liatris). Barrens are particularity abundant and well-preserved in the area of Adams County, Ohio, which includes Adams Lake Prairie, Lynx Prairie, Chaparral Prairie, and others.

Glades are areas of flat rock exposures of bedrock. In the Nashville Basin, glades are most often found in areas that were a matrix of barren and woodland communities. Although historically with a more open grassland border, many are now surrounded by dense thickets of redcedar (Juniperus virginiana) and redbud (Cercis canadensis). Glades are most common the Nashville Basin, although there are rare examples found in the Mitchell Plain, Pennyroyal Plain and Outer Bluegrass. Glades have a flora adapted to extreme dry conditions in the summer, and standing water in the spring. The glades of the Nashville Basin and Moulton Valley are considered a center endemism due to their large number of restricted species. Characteristic species of the Nashville Basin glades include Nashville glade cress (Leavenworthia stylosa), limestone fame-flower (Phemeranthus calcaricus), Nashville breadroot (Pediomelum subacaule), Gattinger's prairie clover (Dalea gattingeri), and Tennessee milk-vetch (Astragalus tennesseensis). Glades in other regions contain less endemism, and are characterized by species such as widow's-cross stonecrop (Sedum pulchellum), limestone skullcap (Scutellaria parvula), glade violet (Viola egglestonii), one-flower gladecress (Leavenworthia uniflora), and poverty dropseed (Sporobolus vaginiflorus). Glade remnants are common and well-preserved due to their undesirability for agriculture, and their largely edaphic nature. Many examples exist in Cedars of Lebanon State Park, as well as numerous other natural areas.

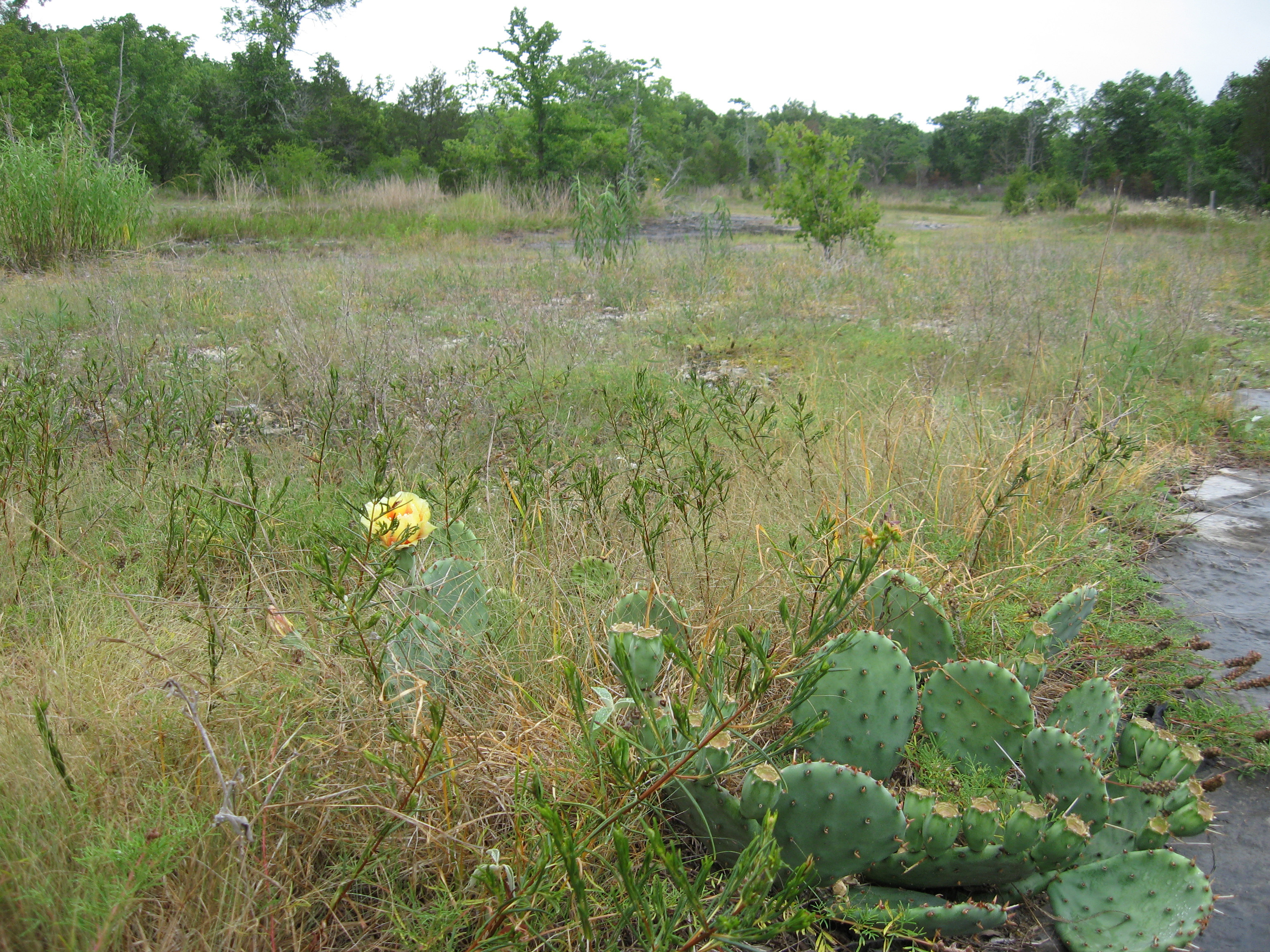
Limestone glade in the Inner Nashville Basin, Tennessee

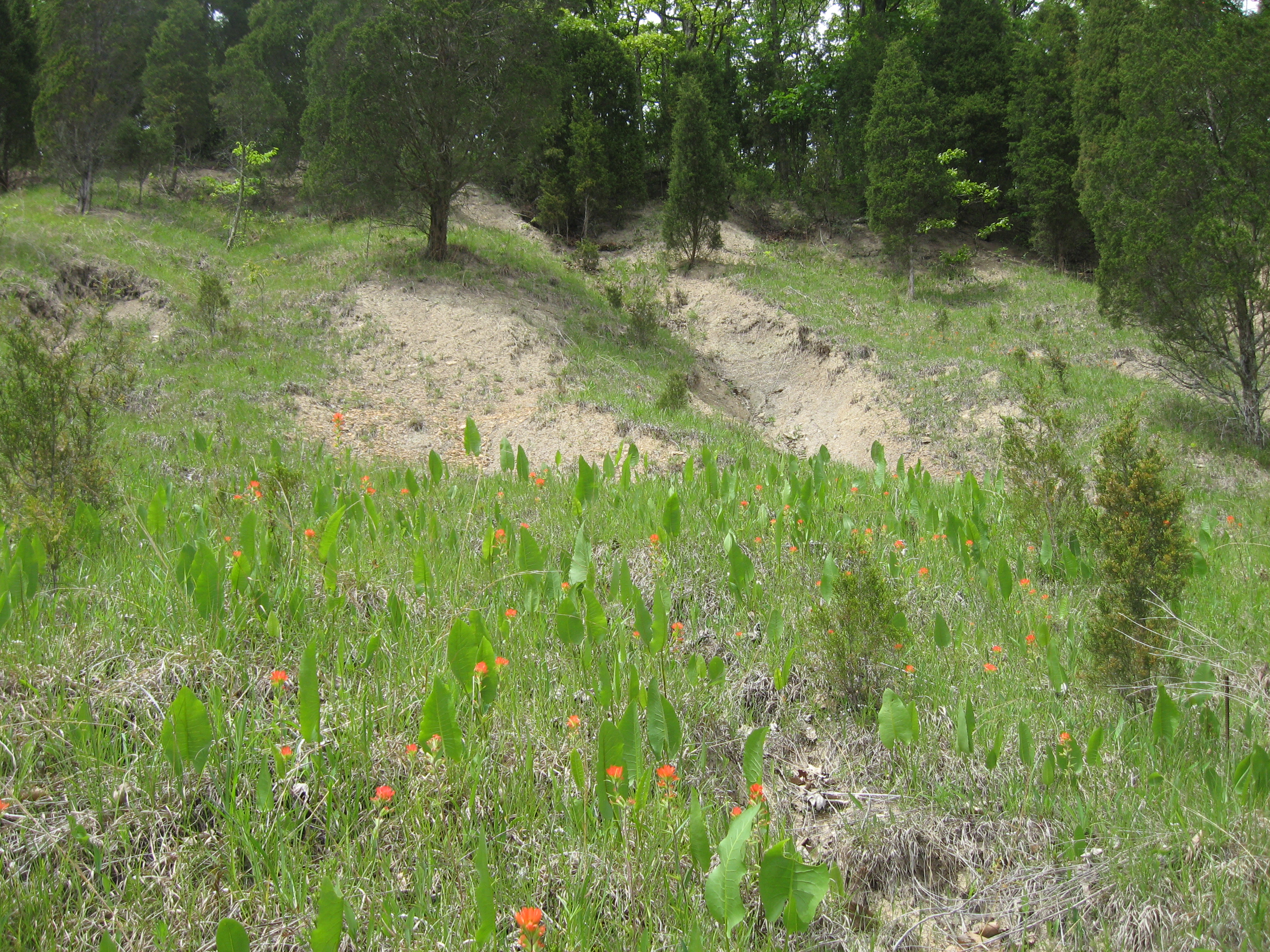
Dolomite barren in the Outer Bluegrass, Kentucky

=== Wetlands ===
The Interior Low Plateau has an abundance of sinkhole ponds in the karst regions of the Mitchell Plain, Pennyroyal Plain, and Highland Rim. These isolated communities were historically found within a matrix of wet prairie. These communities are often covered in swamp forest, and are dominated by swamp cottonwood (Populus heterophylla) and red maple (Acer rubrum). High-quality herbaceous examples have species with coastal plain affinities. Many of these communities have been destroyed due to drainage for agriculture.

Emergent shrub sloughs are found along the bottoms of major rivers, such as the Cumberland River and Tennessee River. These are dominated by buttonbush (Cephalanthus occidentalis), and along the Tennessee River contain bald-cypress (Taxodium distichum). These sloughs were historically widespread, but dam construction and agricultural activity have destroyed most of them.

A rare wetland type in this region is the calcareous seepage fen. These are found sparingly in the Highland Rim, and are dominated by grass of Parnassus (Parnassia grandifolia) and contain the federally-endangered Tennessee yellow-eyed grass (Xyris tennesseensis). Calcareous seeps are also found near glades in the Inner Nashville Basin. These communities often have extensive stands of sunnybells (Schoenolirion croceum) and other rare species. Calcareous seeps and swamp forest are also found sparingly in the Bluegrass region. These contain trees such as green ash (Fraxinus pennsylvanica) and swamp white oak (Quercus bicolor), along with many herbaceous plants that are considered regionally rare.

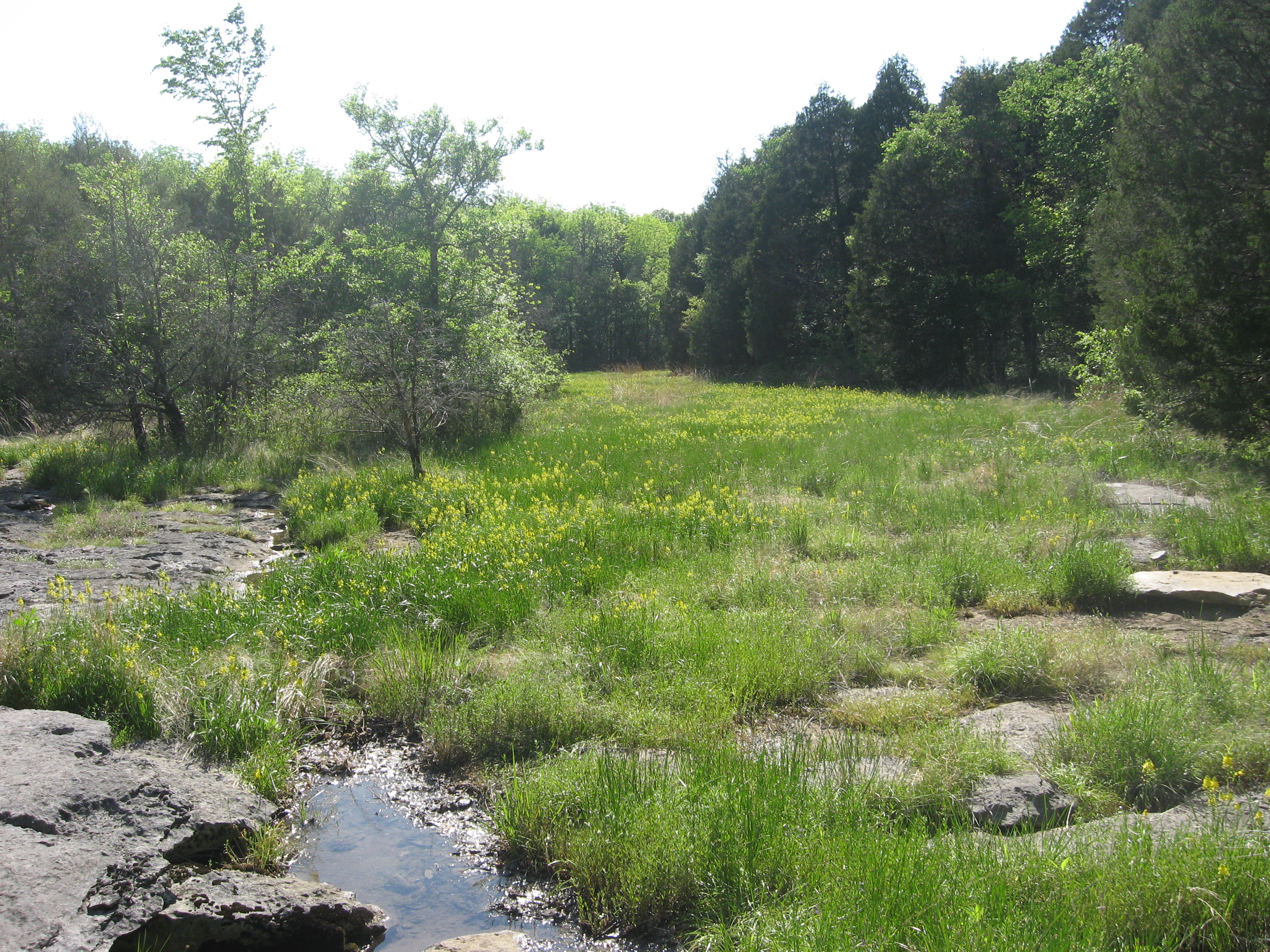
Calcareous seepage fen in the Inner Nashville Basin, Tennessee

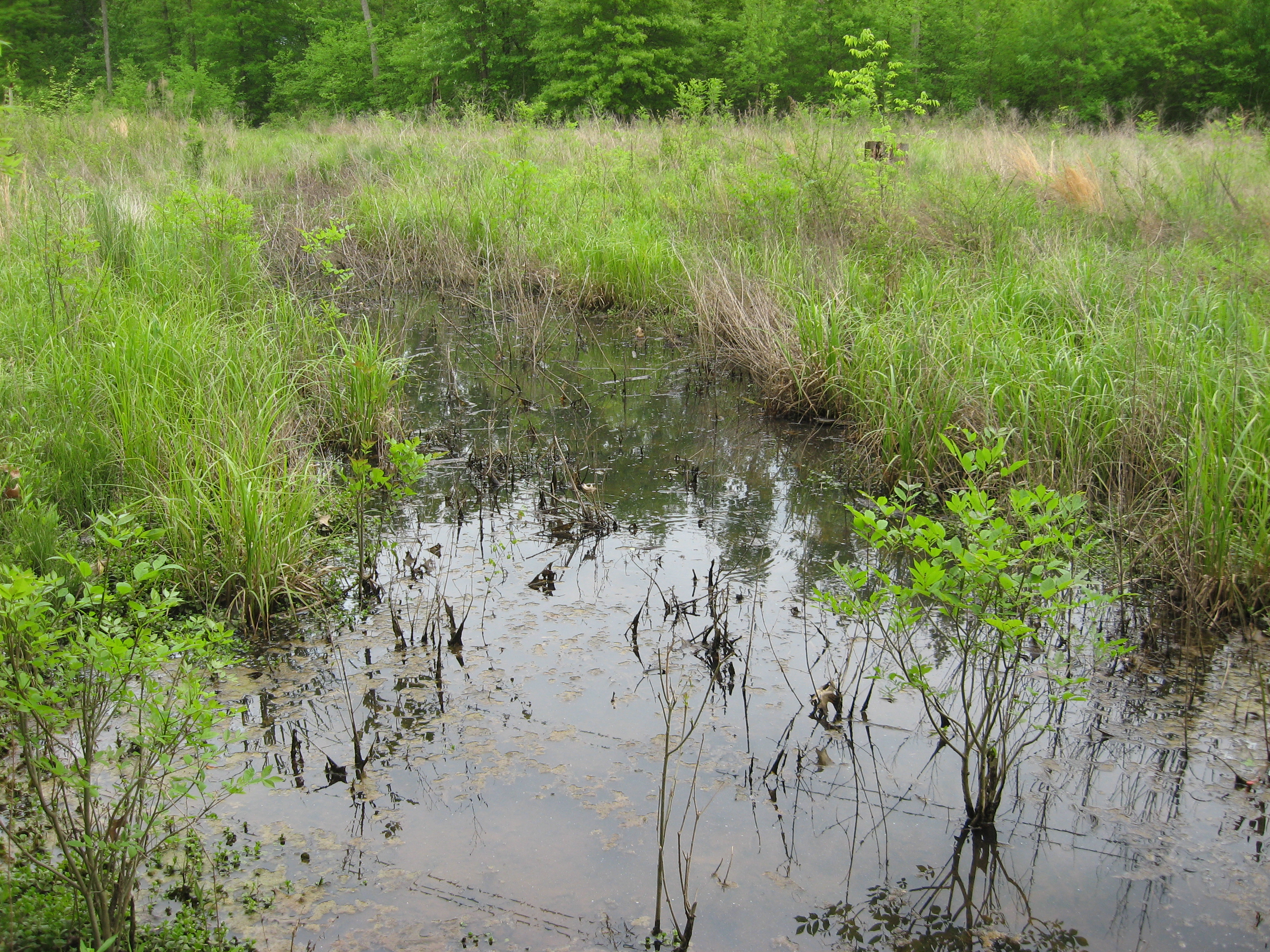
Emergent slough along the Cumberland River, Tennessee

== Fauna ==
This region contains the richest diversity of freshwater animals in North America. In particular, the Duck River in Tennessee is considered one of the top three most biologically rich rivers in the world, containing over 150 species of fish, 60 species of freshwater mussels, and 22 species of aquatic snails. The Green River in this region also harbors diversity of a similar scale. This high amount of freshwater mussel diversity is due to the limestone bedrock underlying much of the region. The limestone creates calcareous water that acts as a buffer against acidity, which helps the mussels in shell-building.

Birds of the woodlands include vireos and tanagers while mammals include Eastern gray squirrels, chipmunks, raccoons and opossums.

== Threats ==
The dominance of oak in this part of the pre-Columbian savannas of North America was due to frequent fires. The fire suppression policies since the 1930s have been a significant forest disturbance.

Today there is very little intact habitat in this ecoregion, with a reduction of bottomland hardwood forests by 70–95%, and only 0.02 percent of the original oak savannas remain. Although much of the area is forested, these forests tend to be highly fragmented and significantly altered by development, agriculture, and fire suppression. The forests are dominated primarily by oak and hickory species, but succession has filled the understory with maples and yellow poplar and blocking oak regeneration. In some areas, habitat is threatened by urbanization and invasive species such as non-native privet, honeysuckle, garlic mustard and kudzu.

== Protected Land ==
Significant natural areas in the ecoregion include: Mammoth Cave National Park; the Land Between the Lakes National Recreation Area of Tennessee and Kentucky; Hoosier National Forest and Yellowwood State Forest in southern Indiana; the Edge of Appalachia Preserve in Ohio; and the Shawnee Hills in southern Illinois.

== See also ==
- Physiographic regions of the world
- List of ecoregions in the United States (EPA) the USEPA uses the designation, and assigns to it, number 71
- List of ecoregions in the United States (WWF), the WWF provides an alternate classification and includes this region in primarily its Central U.S. hardwood forests designation
