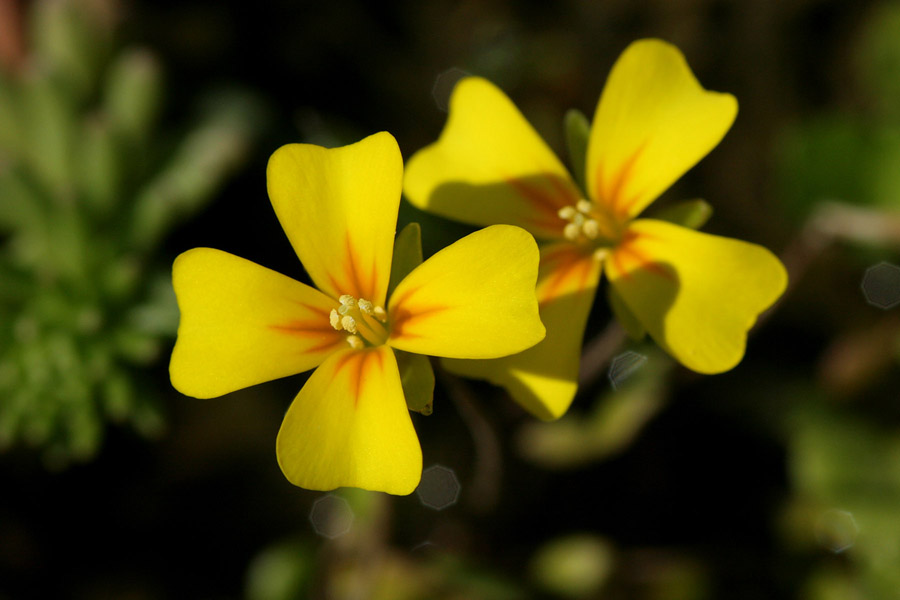

Conservation status
- Imperiled (NatureServe)

Scientific classification
- Kingdom: Plantae
- Clade: Tracheophytes
- Clade: Angiosperms
- Clade: Eudicots
- Clade: Rosids
- Order: Brassicales
- Family: Brassicaceae
- Genus: Leavenworthia
- Species: L. crassa

Binomial name
- Leavenworthia crassa Rollins

= Leavenworthia crassa =

Species of flowering plant

Leavenworthia crassa is a species of flowering plant in the mustard family, Brassicaceae, known commonly as the fleshy-fruit gladecress. It is endemic to Alabama in the United States, where it occurs in only two counties. It is "likely one of the most imperiled plant species in the Southeast," and the United States Fish and Wildlife Service issued a final rule listing it as an endangered species in 2014.

== Description ==
This plant is variable in appearance. Its morphology is determined by its genes rather than environmental conditions, and it reflects the variable breeding system of the species. Some individuals are self-incompatible and must receive pollen from other plants in order to reproduce, while others can fertilize themselves. Populations of the species have both self-incompatible and self-fertilizing individuals, but some populations are almost entirely selfing. Self-incompatible plants have a morphology that encourages pollen transfer: the flowers are large and aromatic and have anthers that are extrorse, facing outward. These plants also have two flower color morphs. Self-compatible plants have smaller, barely scented flowers with introrse, or inward-facing anthers.

This annual herb forms a rosette of leaves but usually has no stem. Flowers are borne on long pedicels that emerge from bracts hidden in the leaf rosette. In favorable conditions the plant may later grow a stem with an inflorescence.

The leaves have blades up to 8 centimeters long which have one to eight lobes on each edge, with the largest one at the tip. The margins are smooth or toothed. The pedicels holding the flowers are 4 to 8 centimeters long. The flower has 4 petals, each 1 to 1.4 centimeters long with a notch in the tip. The two petal color morphs are white and yellow, but all the petals have yellow or orange bases. The fruit is a smooth, oblong or somewhat rounded silicle up to about 1.4 centimeters long. The winged seeds are roughly 2 or 3 millimeters long.

== Ecology ==
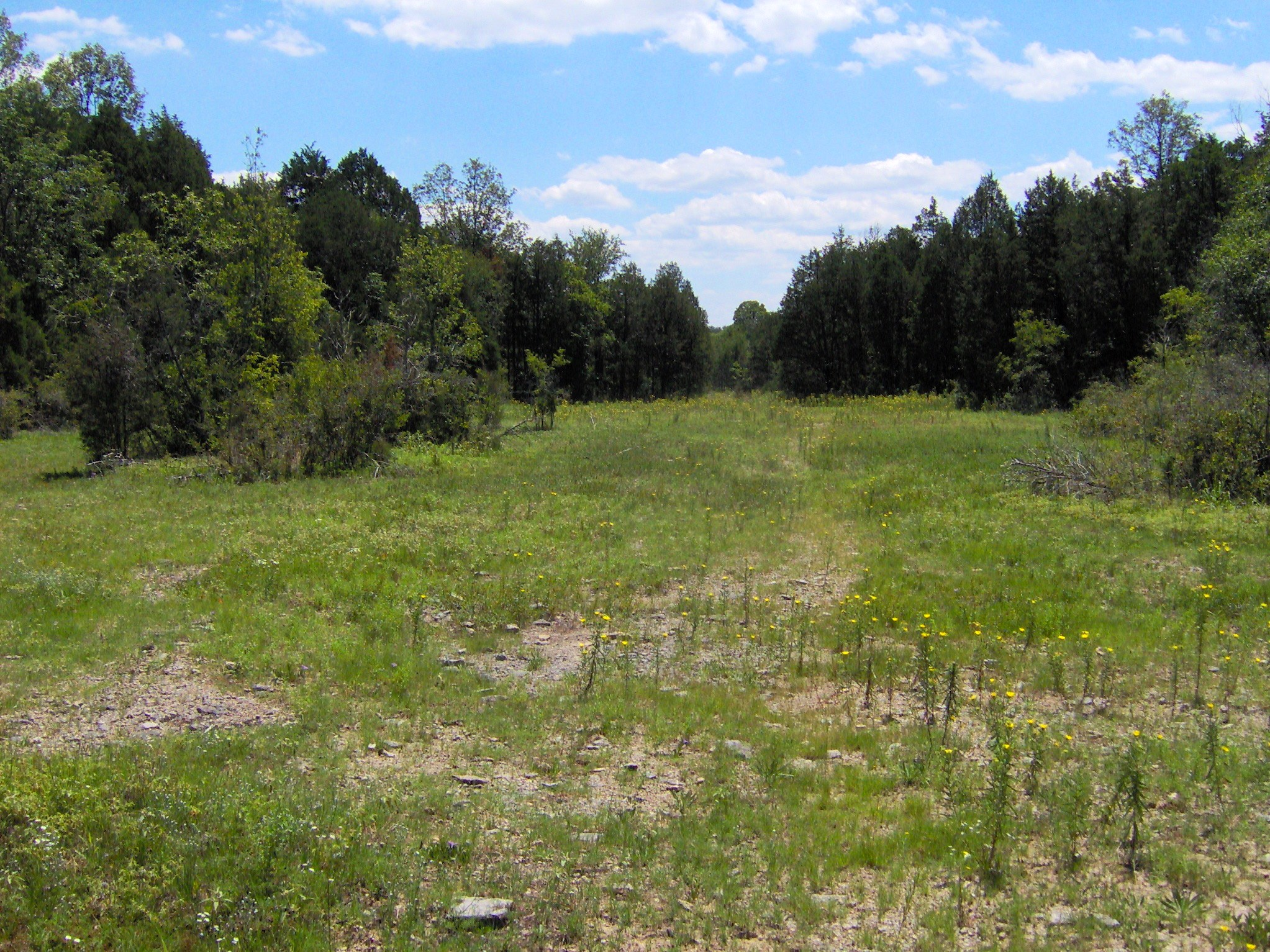
Cedar glade

Like other species in the small genus Leavenworthia, this plant is adapted to cedar glade habitat. These glades are sunny openings in woods dominated by eastern red cedar (Juniperus virginiana). They have thin soils over sheets of limestone, with many bare rock and gravel outcroppings. The soils are very wet during the winter and spring and very dry in the summer. The species requires the full sun of this open habitat type and cannot survive in shady areas. Other plants in the habitat include Tennessee milkvetch (Astragalus tennesseensis), Alabama gladecress (Leavenworthia alabamica), Michaux's gladecress (Leavenworthia uniflora), dwarf larkspur (Delphinium tricorne), smooth rockcress (Boechera laevigata), yellow sunnybell (Schoenolirion croceum), and small skullcap (Scutellaria parvula).

Pollinators of the outcrossing plants probably include halictid bees such as Halictus ligatus.

== Conservation ==
This plant grows at six small sites within a 13-mile radius in Lawrence and Morgan Counties in northern Alabama. Some populations are very small, but in some areas the plant is locally abundant. The total population size was approximately 12,000 individuals in 2009. Most of the occurrences are on privately owned land. One site is in a protected area in William B. Bankhead National Forest.

A main threat to the species is the loss and disturbance of its cedar glade habitat. About 50% of the region's cedar glades have been lost since European settlement, and remaining glades are fragmented and altered by grazing, cultivation, and residential development. Many are affected by activity related to roadways, such as herbicides, road construction, grading, trash dumping, and off-road vehicles. Modified glades no longer maintain themselves through the natural processes of drought, wildfire, and erosion, and the openings shrink as woody vegetation closes in. The sunny open spots required by the plant are reduced. The process is hastened by invasive species of plants, especially common privet (Ligustrum vulgare) and bush honeysuckle (Lonicera maackii).

The proposal to list the plant as an endangered species was made because it "is in danger of extinction throughout all or a significant portion of its range."
