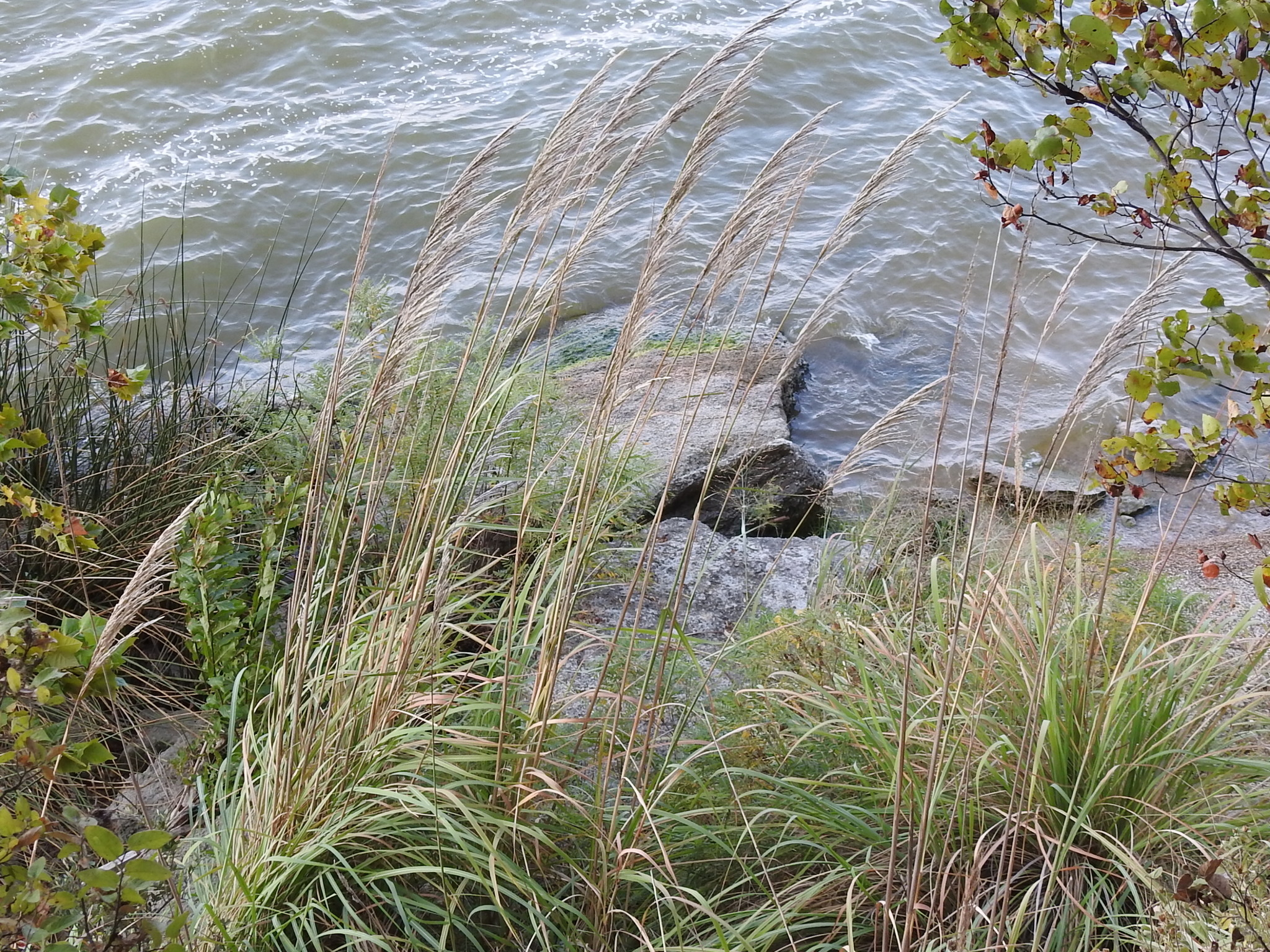
- Erianthus giganteus

Scientific classification
- Kingdom: Plantae
- Clade: Tracheophytes
- Clade: Angiosperms
- Clade: Monocots
- Clade: Commelinids
- Order: Poales
- Family: Poaceae
- Subfamily: Panicoideae
- Supertribe: Andropogonodae
- Tribe: Andropogoneae
- Genus: Erianthus; Michx.

= Erianthus (plant) =

Genus of grasses

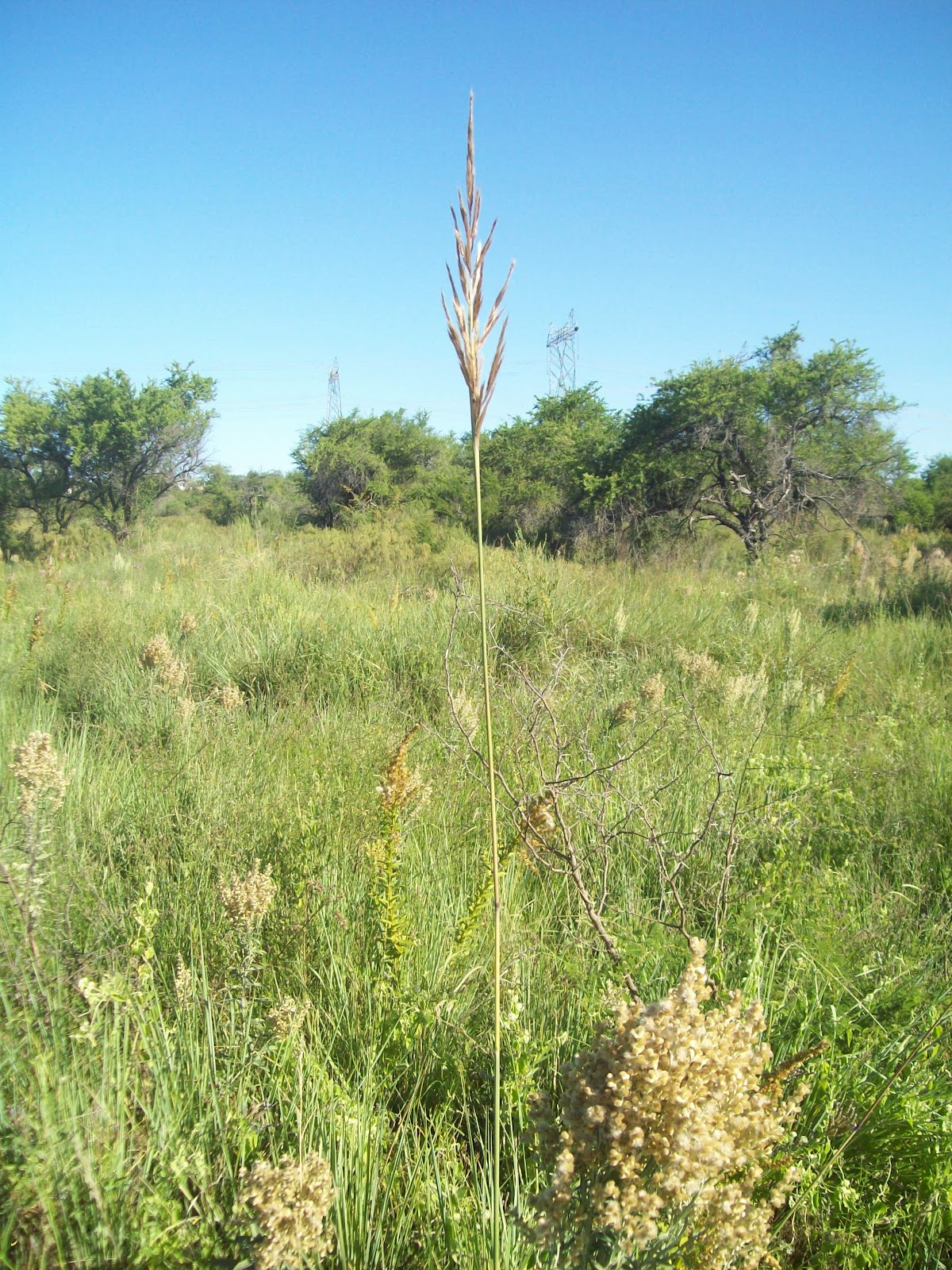
Erianthus angustifolius

Erianthus is a genus of tall, perennial grasses in the Poaceae family. It includes nine species native to the Americas, ranging from the eastern and southeastern United States to parts of Central America and the Caribbean, northern South America, and to Brazil to northeastern Argentina.

== Taxonomy ==
Erianthus belongs to the Andropogoneae tribe and within that tribe they belong to the saccharine subtribe. The Genus Erianthus was established by Michaux in Flora Boreali-Americana in 1803 . It is a primitive genus of the "saccharine complex" and is widely distributed in America, Mediterranean, India, China, South East Asia, and New Guinea.

== Description ==
Erianthus is a native Ornamental grass in the Poaceae family and is closely related to sugarcane. They are found naturally in wetlands, marshes, and ditches. Erianthus can grow 15'-20' tall in tropical areas and have large arching leaf blades with sharp edges.

The leaves of the Erianthus plant are long and narrow, and are located on the lower stem. The leaves can be 4–5 ft across and are medium gray-green with a white mid vein. The leaves are bilaterally serrated and have fine hairs. The top surface of the leaf near the base of the blade is covered with long, fuzzy, and tan-yellowish hairs that also cover the ligule.

== Habitat ==
Erianthus is usually found in dry to moist fields, meadows, roadsides, and woodland influenced by incendiary fires. They need 6 or more hours of direct sunlight everyday.

== Flowers ==
The flower heads are pale, silvery, feathery plumes at the tips of tall flower stalks that appear in late summer and early fall. The inflorescence occurs at the stem tip.

== Uses ==
Erianthus has a high biomass productivity, is drought tolerant, and disease resistant. Breeders use Erianthus to transfer beneficial traits to sugarcane such as genetic diversity and stress intolerance which makes the crop more productive. Erianthus giganteus contributes to the wetland ecosystem by loosing portions of its leaf and culm biomass during senescence. This supports rapid microbial composition because the carbon dioxide and nutrients are released before the plant reaches the surface.

== Seed dispersal ==
The main seed dispersal mechanism is wind and water.

== Species ==
Nine species are accepted.

- Erianthus alopecuroides (L.) Elliott
- Erianthus angustifolius Nees
- Erianthus asper Nees
- Erianthus brevibarbis Michx.
- Erianthus coarctatus Fernald
- Erianthus contortus Baldwin ex Elliott
- Erianthus giganteus (Walter) P.Beauv.
- Erianthus strictus Baldwin
- Erianthus trinii (Hack.) Hack.
