= Leavenworthia exigua var. laciniata =

Scientific classification
- Kingdom: Plantae
- Clade: Tracheophytes
- Clade: Angiosperms
- Clade: Eudicots
- Clade: Rosids
- Order: Brassicales
- Family: Brassicaceae
- Genus: Leavenworthia
- Species: L. exigua
- Variety: L. e. var. laciniata

Trinomial name
- Leavenworthia exigua var. laciniata Rollins, 1963

Species of flower

Leavenworthia exigua var. laciniata, the Kentucky glade cress, is a threatened variety of flowering annual plant in the mustard family endemic to a small area in the southern outskirts of Louisville, Kentucky. The taxon is listed as threatened by the U.S. Fish and Wildlife Service. The federal government designated 2,053 acres as critical habitat for Kentucky glade cress. Critical habitat for the species in Kentucky's Bullitt and Jefferson counties is threatened by developers, including a proposed natural gas pipeline from Louisville Gas & Electric. A campaign to protect the Kentucky glade cress exists.
