= Erianthus coarctatus =

Scientific classification
- Kingdom: Plantae
- Clade: Tracheophytes
- Clade: Angiosperms
- Clade: Monocots
- Clade: Commelinids
- Order: Poales
- Family: Poaceae
- Subfamily: Panicoideae
- Genus: Erianthus
- Species: E. coarctatus

Binomial name
- Erianthus coarctatus Fernald

Species of perennial grass

Erianthus coarctatus, the compressed plumegrass or brown plume grass, is a species of perennial grass found in North America.

== Description ==
Erianthus coarctatus can reach 1–1.5 metres (3 ft 3 in – 4 ft 11 in) in height, with blades up to 40 centimetres (16 in) in length and 1 centimeters in width. The blades are scaberulous with glabrous sheaths. When grain is produced, it is ellipsoid in shape, reddish in color, and reaches a length of 2–3.5 millimetres (0.08–0.14 in).

== Distribution and habitat ==
Within North America E. coarctatus's range stretches from Delaware to Florida and westward to Texas.

It can be found in mesic environments such as marshes, swamps, and depression ponds. E. coarctatus is often observed in habitats that experience frequent fire.
