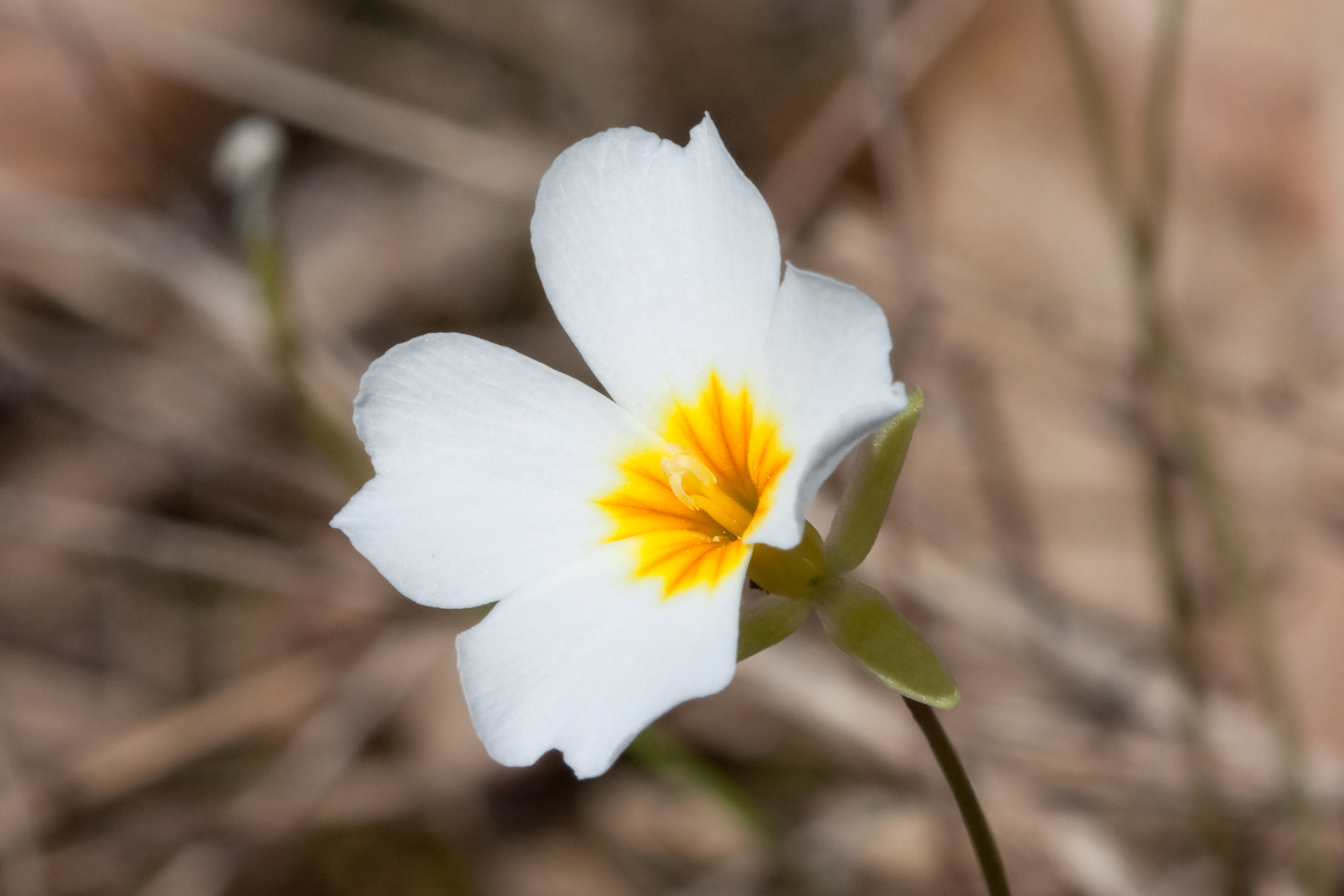
- Leavenworthia stylosa

Scientific classification
- Kingdom: Plantae
- Clade: Embryophytes
- Clade: Tracheophytes
- Clade: Angiosperms
- Clade: Eudicots
- Clade: Rosids
- Order: Brassicales
- Family: Brassicaceae
- Genus: Leavenworthia; Torr.

Species
- about 8, see text

= Leavenworthia =

Genus of flowering plants

Leavenworthia is a genus of flowering plants in the family Brassicaceae. It includes about eight species native to the southern and southeastern United States. They are known generally as gladecresses.

== Description ==
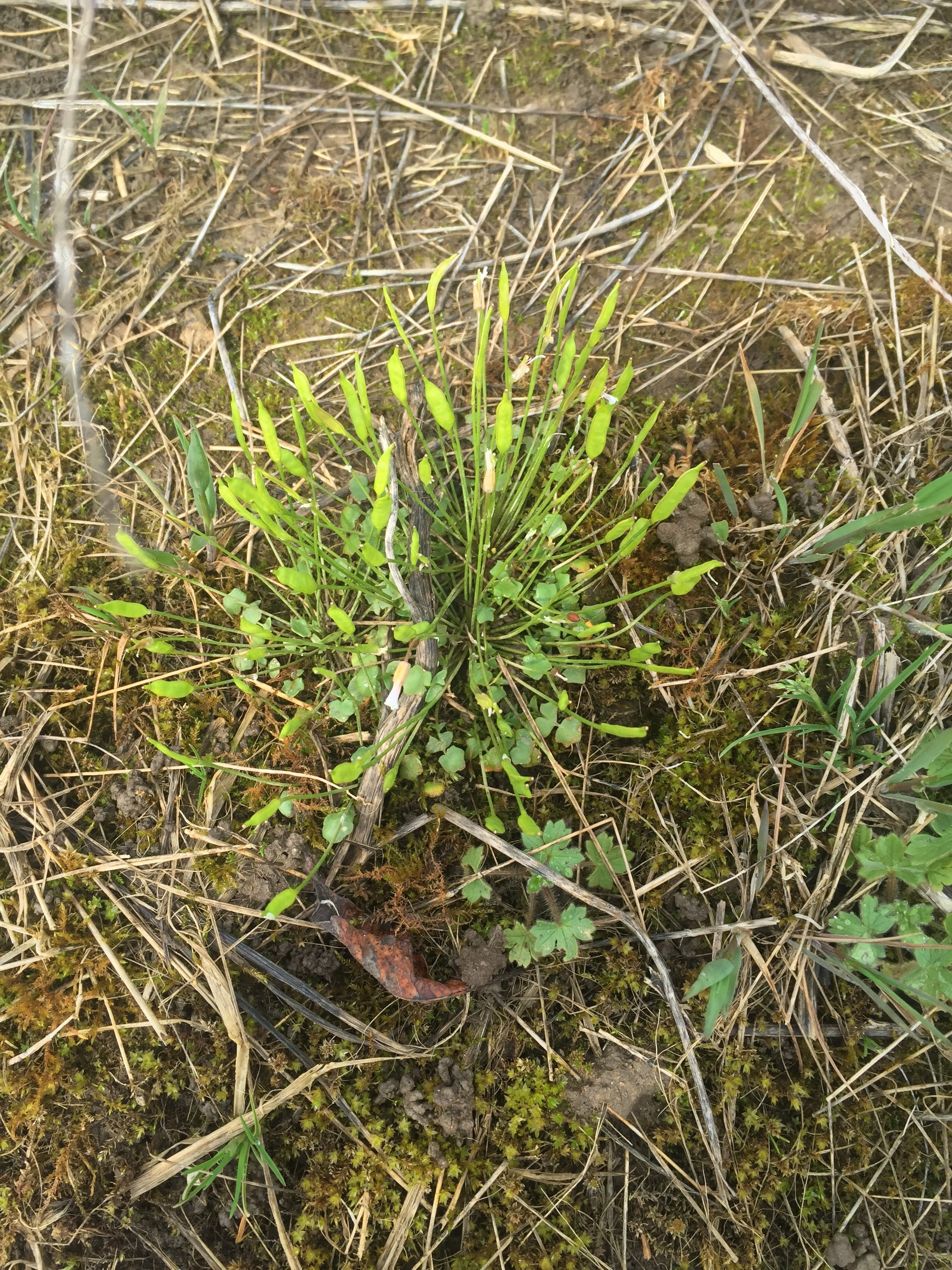
Leavenworthia exigua from Central Tennessee showing characteristic siliques.

These are small annual herbs under 10 centimeters tall. They produce a basal rosette of leaves and often lack a true stem, instead sending up a scape, a flowering stalk topped with an inflorescence. The inflorescence is usually made up of just one flower, but a large plant may produce several flowers in a raceme. The petals are white, yellow, orange, or lavender. They are often notched and clawed, narrow at the base and wider at the tip. There are six stamens, two short and four long. The fruits are siliques or silicles of various shapes. The seeds are flattened and have wide margins or wings.

== Ecology ==
Leavenworthia species are mainly restricted to habitats with limestone substrates, especially cedar glades. These glades can be very wet in winter and spring, even flooded. Several species are narrow endemics in terms of geography; L. alabamica and L. crassa are endemic to Alabama, L. aurea to Oklahoma, L. stylosa to Tennessee, and L. texana to Texas.

== Breeding systems ==
The mating systems found in genus Leavenworthia have been studied extensively because they are variable and have changed several times in the evolutionary history of the group. Some species are self-compatible, while others are self-incompatible. L. exigua, L. torulosa, and L. uniflora are self-compatible, able to produce seed from ovules fertilized by their own pollen. In L. alabamica and L. crassa, separate populations of self-compatible and self-incompatible individuals have been observed. At at least three points in the history of Leavenworthia there have been transitions between mating systems, in which self-incompatible plants evolved self-compatibility, developing the ability to fertilize their own ovules.

This process has inspired studies of the genetics of the genus, which may help explain how such changes occurred. Self-incompatibility is the ancestral state of the genus, and it has been lost several times. The transition from self-incompatibility to self-compatibility is described as the loss of a barrier, rather than the gain of a new function; in L. alabamica, for example, a mutation in a pollen gene may have led to the production of compatible pollen. Self-compatible plants are also shaped differently, with smaller flowers in which the pollen-bearing anthers are positioned closer to the stigma.

== Diversity ==
Taxa include:

- Leavenworthia alabamica Rollins – Alabama gladecress
  - Leavenworthia alabamica var. alabamica
  - Leavenworthia alabamica var. brachystyla
- Leavenworthia aurea Torr. – golden gladecress, golden yelloweye
- Leavenworthia crassa Rollins – fleshyfruit gladecress
  - Leavenworthia crassa var. crassa
  - Leavenworthia crassa var. elongata
- Leavenworthia exigua Rollins – Tennessee gladecress
  - Leavenworthia exigua var. exigua
  - Leavenworthia exigua var. laciniata – Kentucky gladecress
  - Leavenworthia exigua var. lutea
- Leavenworthia stylosa A.Gray ex Chapm. – cedar gladecress
- Leavenworthia texana Mahler (syn. L. aurea var. texana) – Texas golden gladecress
- Leavenworthia torulosa A.Gray – necklace gladecress
- Leavenworthia uniflora (Michx.) Britton – Michaux's gladecress
