= Lynx Prairie =

Nature preserve in Adams County, Ohio, United States

Coordinates: 38°45′34″N 83°24′25″W

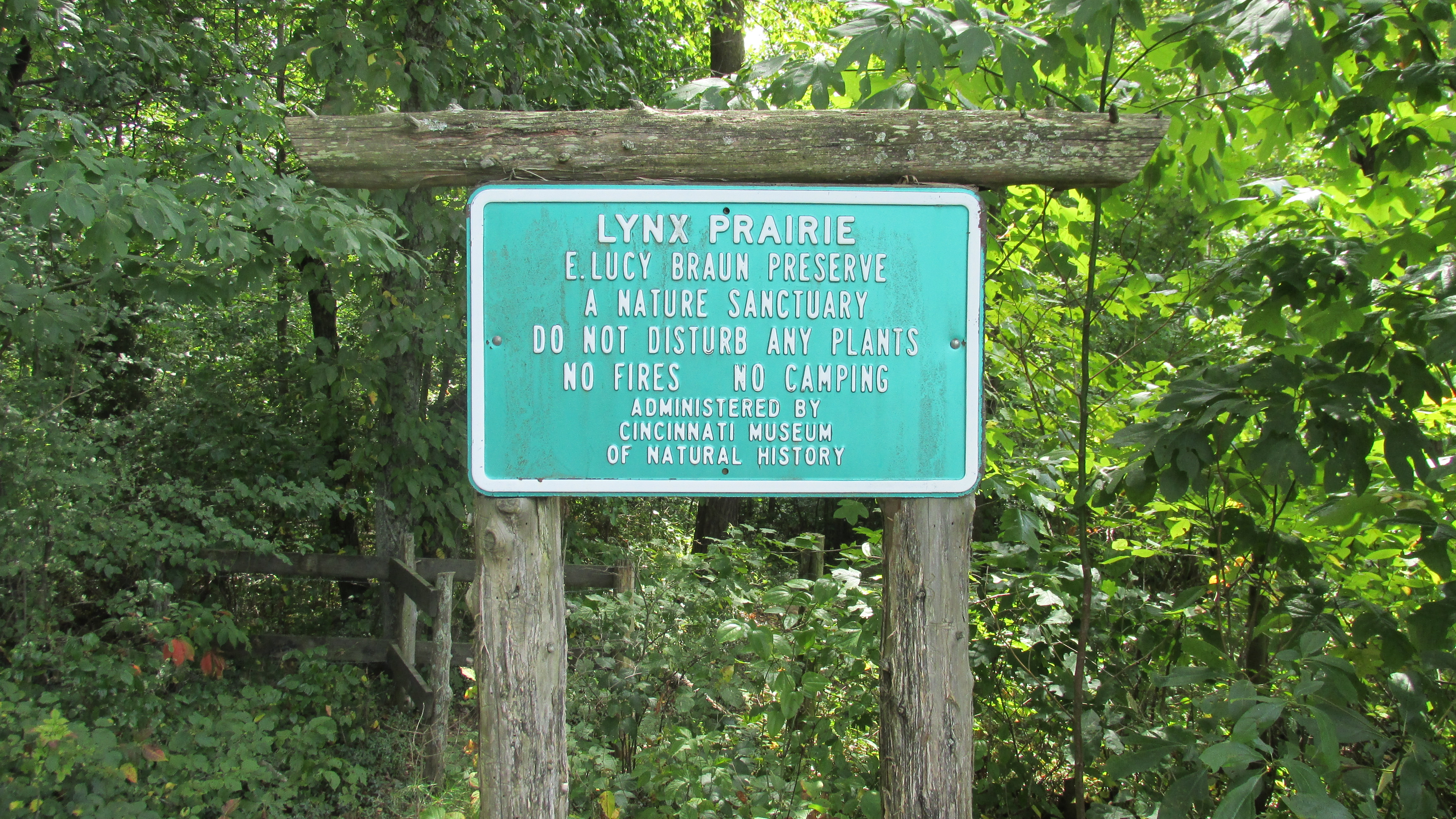
Lynx Prairie trail head marker

Lynx Prairie is a 52-acre (210,000 m^{2}) nature preserve located in Adams County, Ohio, United States, near the community of Lynx. The preserve features a group of cedar glades which harbor rare prairie species, surrounded by forests on all sides.

The prairie species are a remnant of a rare ecosystem, which has found refuge on the dry, rocky openings in this part of the state. These grassland openings were probably created by the extinct Megafauna that were once found in the area, although Native American use of fire may have also played a role in maintaining this landscape. Today, controlled burns are used at Lynx Prairie to keep woody species at bay.

Many rare plants are found at Lynx Prairie such as American bluehearts (Buchnera americana), rattlesnake master (Eryngium yuccifolium), crested coralroot (Hexalectris spicata), gladecress (Leavenworthia uniflora), scaly blazing star (Liatris squarrosa), and Texas rock sandwort (Minuartia michauxii var. texana).

The southern shrub rusty blackhaw (Viburnum rufidulum) is found in the woods surrounding the prairie. It is approaching the northern limit of its range here and is considered rare in Ohio.

Lynx Prairie is owned by The Nature Conservancy and features 1.5 miles (2.4 km) of trail loops. Parking for the preserve is at East Liberty Church and the trail head is marked at the southeast corner of the cemetery.

Emma Lucy Braun was an early advocate for the prairie. Her efforts to protect an initial 22 acres (8.9 ha) led to the establishment of the Richard & Lucile Durrell Edge of Appalachia Preserve System.

In 1967, the Buzzardroost Rock-Lynx Prairie-The Wilderness areas were designated as a National Natural Landmark by the National Park Service.
