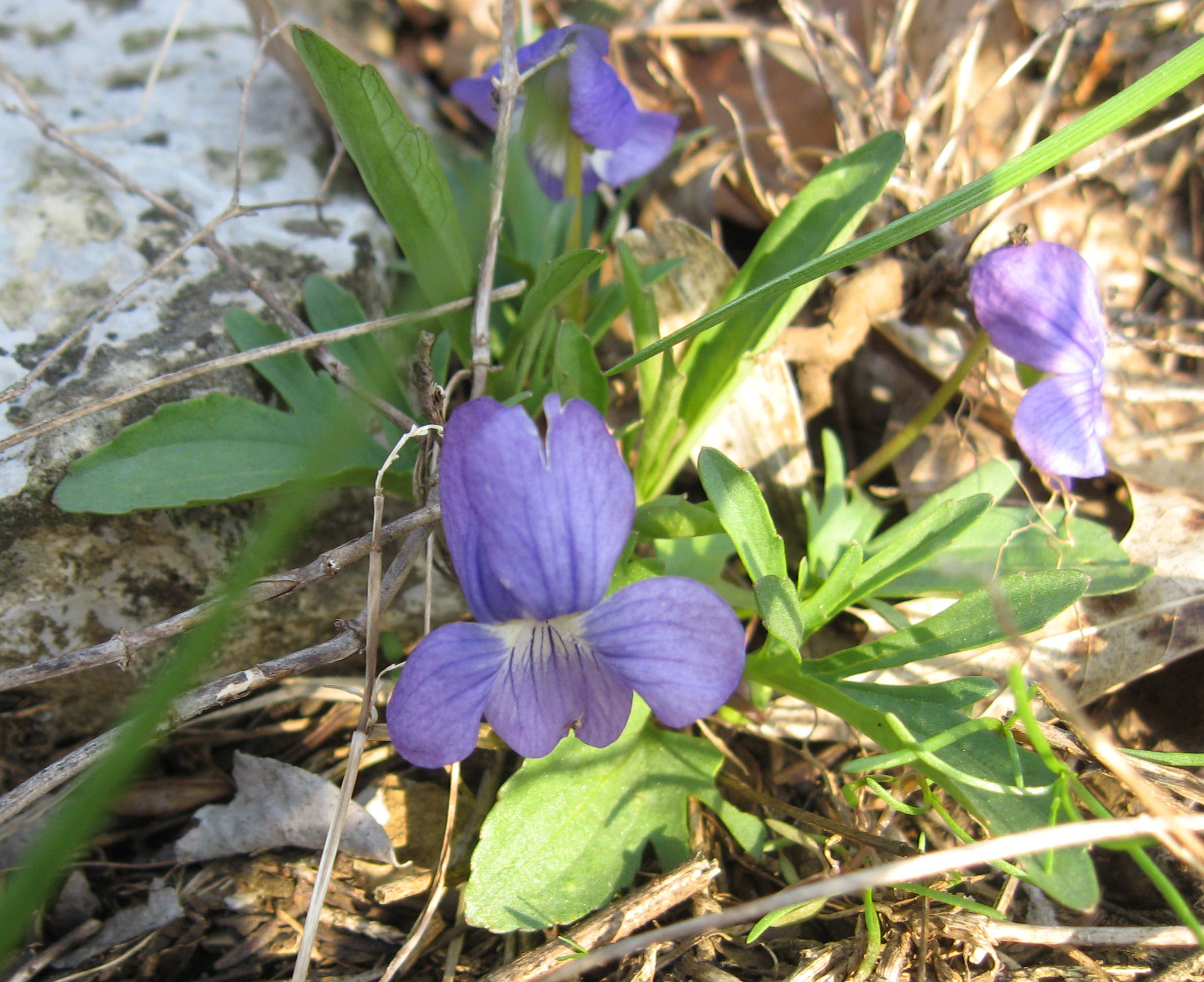

Scientific classification
- Kingdom: Plantae
- Clade: Tracheophytes
- Clade: Angiosperms
- Clade: Eudicots
- Clade: Rosids
- Order: Malpighiales
- Family: Violaceae
- Genus: Viola
- Species: V. egglestonii

Binomial name
- Viola egglestonii Brainerd

= Viola egglestonii =

Species of flowering plant

Viola egglestonii, commonly known as glade violet, is a species herbaceous plant in the violet family. It is native to a small area of eastern North America, only being found in limestone cedar glades of the Interior Low Plateau and Ridge and Valley ecoregions of Alabama, Georgia, Indiana, Kentucky, and Tennessee.

Viola egglestonii is a perennial, stemless blue violet, distinguished by its deeply lobed leaves, bearded petals, and glabrous leaves. It blooms from early to mid April. The cedar glade habitat which it is endemic to is generally rare, and populations of this species are tracked in all of the states it is found in except Tennessee. It is the most common in Tennessee's Nashville Basin due to the region's relative abundance of limestone cedar glades.
