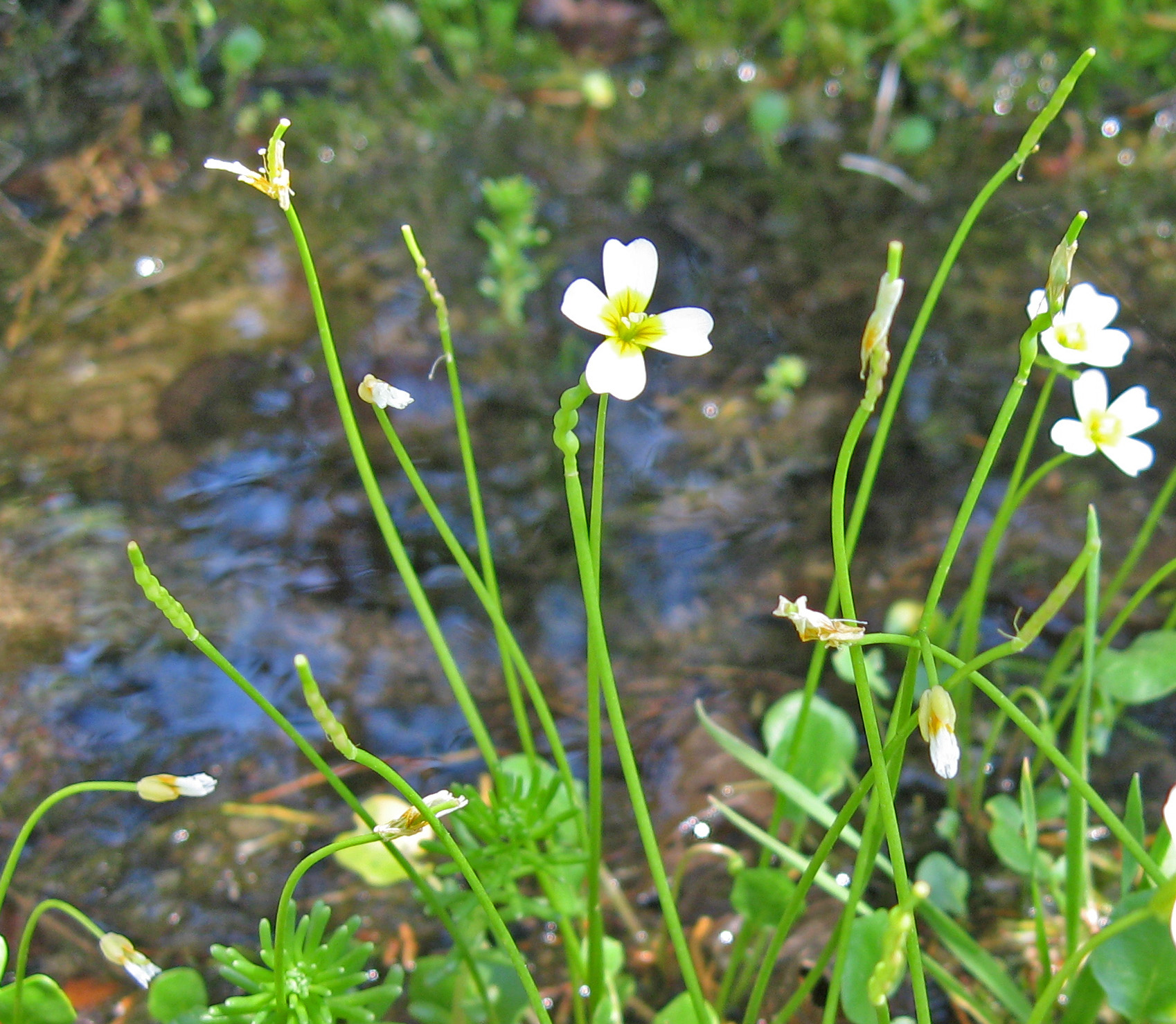

Scientific classification
- Kingdom: Plantae
- Clade: Tracheophytes
- Clade: Angiosperms
- Clade: Eudicots
- Clade: Rosids
- Order: Brassicales
- Family: Brassicaceae
- Genus: Leavenworthia
- Species: L. torulosa

Binomial name
- Leavenworthia torulosa A.Gray

= Leavenworthia torulosa =

Species of flowering plant

Leavenworthia torulosa, the necklace gladecress, is a species of plant in the mustard family. It is native to the eastern United States where it is only found near limestone cedar glades of Alabama, Georgia, Kentucky, and Tennessee. It is considered rare in all states it is found except Tennessee, where it is common in the Nashville Basin due to the abundance of available habitat.

It is found in more wet-mesic areas than typical Leavenworthia of the region, often growing in standing water. It is a winter annual, which makes it well adapted for the extreme wet and dry seasons of the cedar glades. It produces a relatively large yellow and white flower in early spring and dies with the arrival of summer.

The constricted mature fruits are diagnostic of this species.
