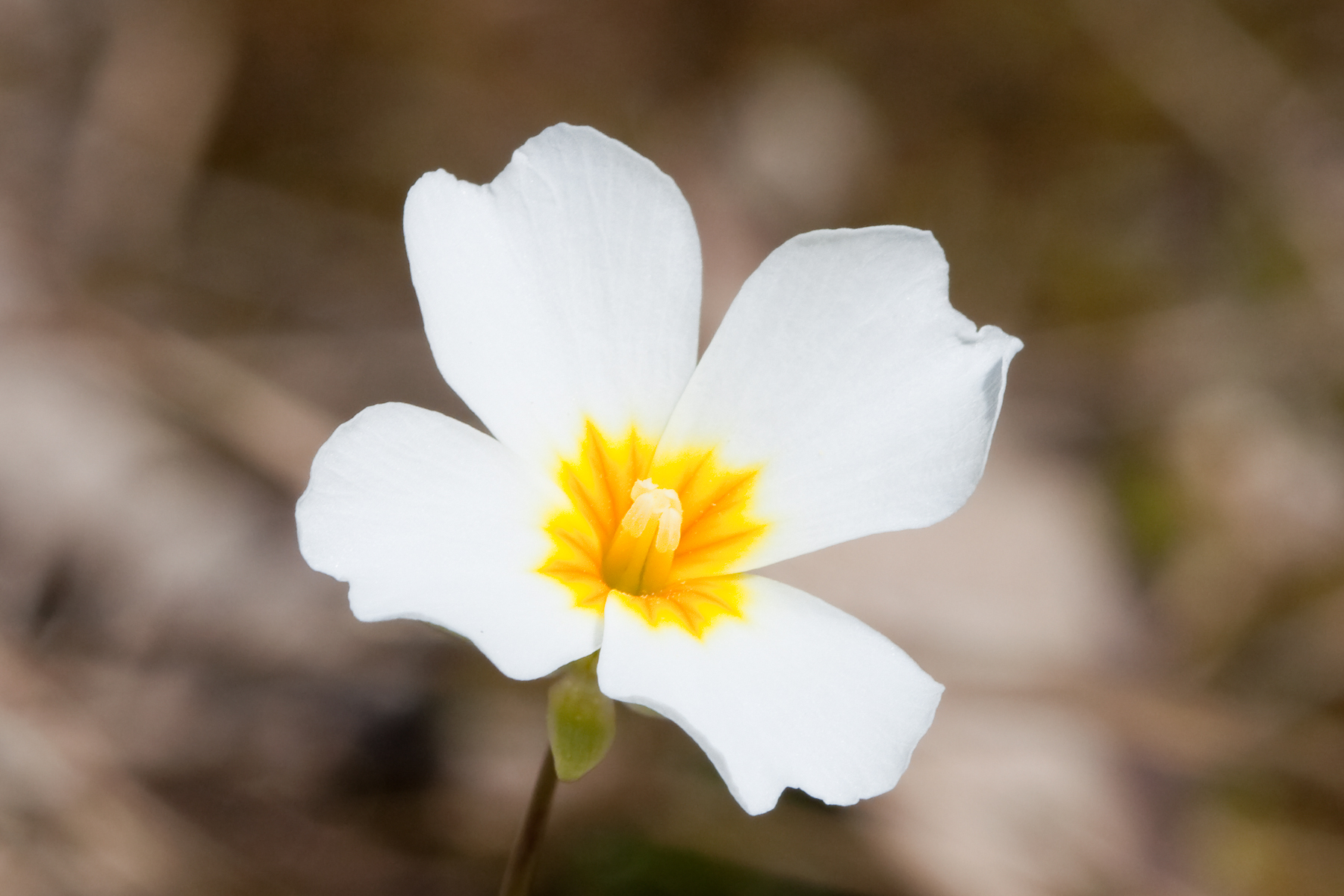
- Leavenworthia stylosa flower

Conservation status
- Apparently Secure (NatureServe)

Scientific classification
- Kingdom: Plantae
- Clade: Tracheophytes
- Clade: Angiosperms
- Clade: Eudicots
- Clade: Rosids
- Order: Brassicales
- Family: Brassicaceae
- Genus: Leavenworthia
- Species: L. stylosa

Binomial name
- Leavenworthia stylosa A.Gray

= Leavenworthia stylosa =

Species of flowering plant

Leavenworthia stylosa is a species of flowering plant in the family Brassicaceae known by the common names cedar gladecress or long-styled gladecress. It is found only in the Central Basin of Tennessee, where it grows in cedar glades, ditches, and low-lying fields. It is an annual herb growing up to 3 in (7.6 cm) tall.

Leavenworthia stylosa typically blooms from March to May. The flowers are about 1 inch wide and are white or yellow in color with a yellow center. The tips of the petals are notched. Yellow varieties are found more commonly north of Nashville, while white varieties are found more commonly south.

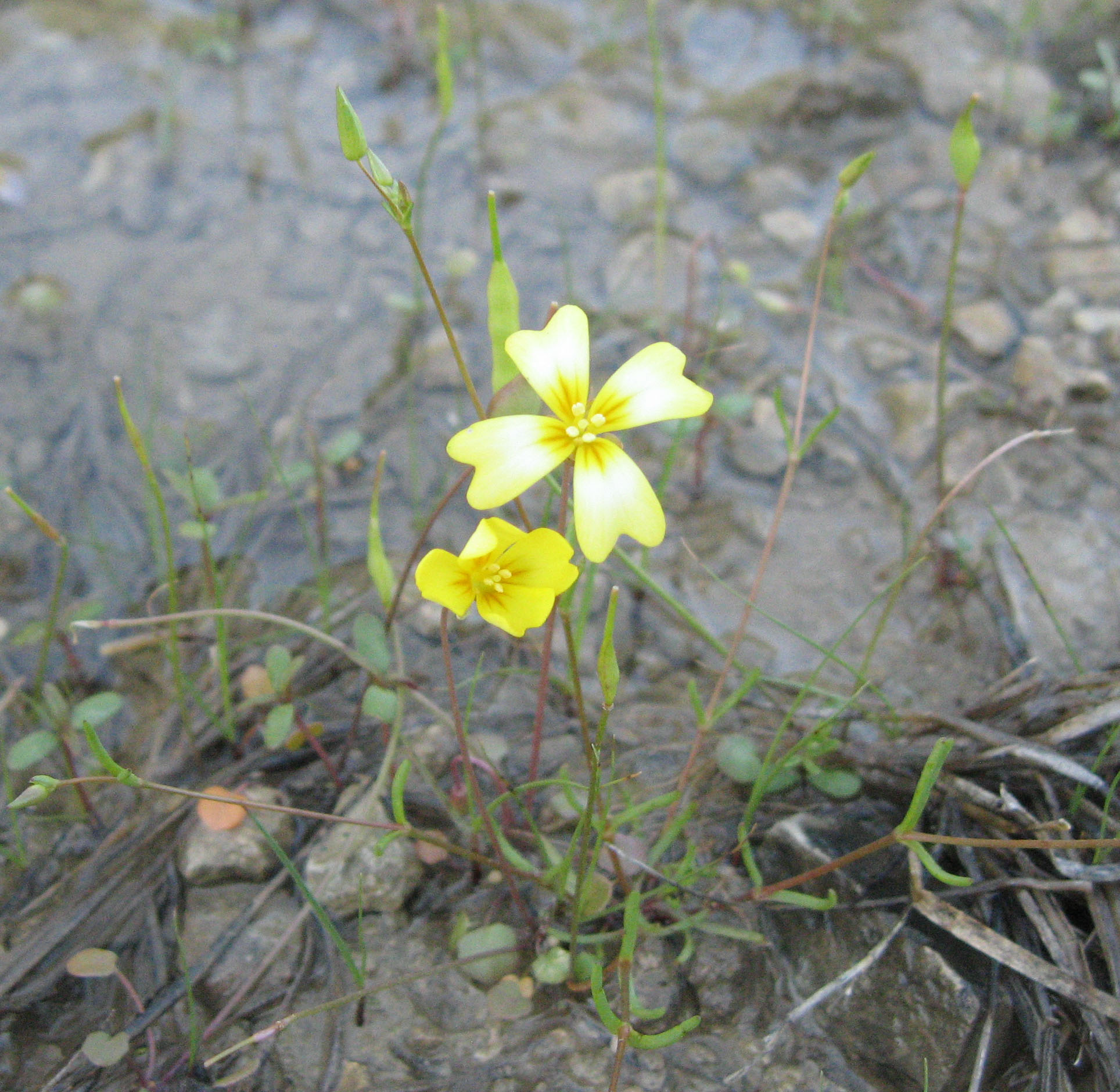
Yellow variation

== Habitat ==
As the common name suggests, Leavenworthia stylosa grows only in cedar glades and adjacent habitat. Cedar glades are sites in the central eastern United States where limestone lies on the surface resulting in an unusual ecosystem. Along with Eastern red cedar, for which the glades are named, Leavenworthia stylosa is one of the characteristic plants.
