= Leavenworthia exigua =

Conservation status
- Vulnerable (NatureServe)

Scientific classification
- Kingdom: Plantae
- Clade: Tracheophytes
- Clade: Angiosperms
- Clade: Eudicots
- Clade: Rosids
- Order: Brassicales
- Family: Brassicaceae
- Genus: Leavenworthia
- Species: L. exigua

Binomial name
- Leavenworthia exigua Rollins

Species of flowering plant

Leavenworthia exigua, also known as the Tennessee gladecress, is a member of the mustard family. Tennessee gladecress is an annual plant that is native to southern United States. It is a fruit-bearing plant, with squarish leaves that fall off one the fruit is present and ripened. Tennessee gladecress is a beautiful plant during its blooming season, as it produces a light-lilac colored, small flower.

== Description ==
Leavenworthia exigua is a member of the Leavenworthia genus along with seven other species. Members of the Leavenworthia genus are often indigenous to southern states, including Kentucky and Tennessee. With seeds that germinate in the fall, L. exigua are annual winter and spring plants; to find a L. exigua, it may be helpful to look for areas of limestone clades where the soil is damp for the winter and spring seasons. There are three different variations of L. exigua found in four southern states: Alabama, Tennessee, Kentucky, and Georgia. Due to its rare nature, L. exiguais protected in all four states.

Leavenworthia exigua reaches approximately 5 to 10 cm (2.0 to 3.9 in) in height with a slender, central stalk. Its early leaves are simple, while mature they are arranged in a lobed pattern, often accompanied by a sharp or square end shape. These leaves are arranged around a rosette of leaves, or a small, whorled cluster of leaves. L. exigua possesses small flowers during the spring seasons, which are identified by having a pale, lilac color. These flowers have four petals with a green, not lilac, sepal.

== Habitat ==
Leavenworthia exigua is most found in limestone (cedar) glades where there is a large amount of water found within the gravelly soil. L. exigua is germinated in the fall season, where it blooms into a small, rosette of leaves during the winter seasons. During this time, the thin soil is rich in nutrients and water, ideal for the nurturing of L. exigua. The lilac-colored flowers and seeds make their appearance in early spring, which lay dormant during the drier summer season.

== Conservation ==
With nearly half of the cedar glades being lost in southern states, L. exigua is considered to be an endangered species although abundant in its areas found, L. exigua is found in very minimal areas. In Georgia, L. exigua is ranked in the S2 bracket, meaning that it is an imperiled plant species. It is currently located in 24 cedar glades, 17 of which are located on conservational land.
