= Edge of Appalachia Preserve =

Protected area in Ohio, United States

Coordinates: 38°47′32″N 83°23′02″W

- Edge of Appalachia Preserve, Adams County, Ohio
- Interactive map of Edge of Appalachia Preserve
- Location: Adams County, Ohio
- Area: 20,000 acres (8,100 ha)
- Established: 1959
- Governing body: The Nature Conservancy, Cincinnati Museum Center

Edge of Appalachia Preserve, also known as Richard and Lucile Durrell Edge of Appalachia Preserve System or simply The Edge, is a series of ten adjacent nature preserves located along the Appalachian Escarpment in Adams County, Ohio. Four of the ten preserves, Lynx Prairie, Buzzardroost Rock, Red Rock and The Wilderness, are National Natural Landmarks. The Preserve is owned and operated by The Nature Conservancy and Cincinnati Museum Center. It is the largest privately owned nature preserve in Ohio.

== History ==
The area encompassing the Edge of Appalachia Preserve was first studied by ecologist Emma Lucy Braun in the 1920s. However, it was not until 1959 when the Nature Conservancy purchased 42 acres (170,000 m^{2}) near Lynx, Ohio that the Edge of Appalachia Preserve was created and established as a protected preserve.

== Biodiversity ==
The Edge of Appalachia Preserve is among the most biologically assorted areas in the Midwestern United States. The preserve is predominantly wooded with over 13,000 acres (53 km^{2}) of forestland. Over 100 rare species of animals and plants are found within the preserve. The Edge of Appalachia Preserve contains 30 ecological communities, eight of which are classified as rare throughout the world. Among its rare plants are the Canby's mountain lover and the northern white cedar. The Edge of Appalachia Preserve is also home to the rare green salamander and Allegheny woodrat. Over 1,200 plant species grow in the preserve.

The preserve has over 27 miles of hiking on five trails, including Buzzardroost Rock Trail, the Wilderness Trail, and the Lynx Prairie Trail.

== Buzzardroost Rock Trail ==
View from Buzzard Roost Rock, Edge of Appalachia Preserve, Adams County, Ohio.

Panoramic view from Buzzard Roost Rock, Edge of Appalachia Preserve, Adams County, Ohio.

Buzzardroost

Hiking trail
- Length: 2.2 mi (3.5 km)
- Difficulty: Moderate

Buzzardroost Rock Trail, also known as Christian and Emma Goetz Buzzardroost Rock Trail, is a hiking trail in the preserve in Adams County, Ohio. It is located in the Appalachian Mountains and has a length of 2.2 miles (3.5 km). It is part of the Buzzard Roost Nature Reserve.

At the end of the trail is a viewing point and boards with information about the trail.
