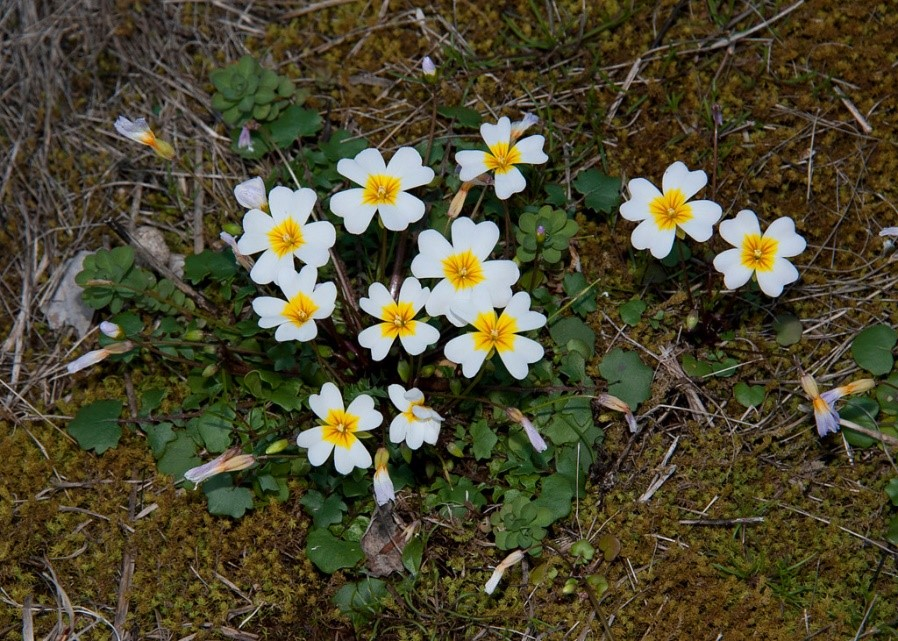

Conservation status
- Imperiled (NatureServe)

Scientific classification
- Kingdom: Plantae
- Clade: Tracheophytes
- Clade: Angiosperms
- Clade: Eudicots
- Clade: Rosids
- Order: Brassicales
- Family: Brassicaceae
- Genus: Leavenworthia
- Species: L. alabamica

Binomial name
- Leavenworthia alabamica Rollins

= Leavenworthia alabamica =

Species of flowering plant

Leavenworthia alabamica is a species of flowering plant in the family Brassicaceae. It is commonly known as Alabama gladecress. It is endemic to Alabama.

== Description ==
Leavenworthia species are winter annual herbs. Scientists use species' genes to determine morphology because some populations are self-compatible, and some are self-incompatible. Self- incompatible species tend to have larger flowers to aid in pollination. The blade of petals tends to be pink or white with a yellow/orange claw.

== Habitat ==
Leavenworthia alabamica occurs in four counties. Populations in Morgan County were found to be self-compatible, which is the opposite of self-incompatible populations found in the other three counties. It flowers between March and April. They are best suited for limestone outcrops and cedar glades. They can also be found in abandoned fields, pastures, rocky knolls, and roadsides.

== Conservation ==
This plant growing only in four counties in Alabama raises conservation concerns. Although abundant within these counties, their habitat limits their distribution. This plant's habitat is also being largely disturbed. Nearly 50% of cedar glades' habitats have been lost. Another cause for conservation concern is that these species are found on roadside ditches. This affects these populations, such as trash dumping, herbicides, and vehicles off-roading.

== Genetics ==
In a study of Leavenworthia alabamica and L. crassa. researchers determined that its self-incompatible type had much higher genetic diversity. Further, they determined that the loss of self-incompatibility resulted in lower overall genetic diversity. However in spite of this, unique alleles have been found to be present in different populations.

The emergence of self-compatibility has been suggested to be a form of reproductive assurance in the wake of population declines. And, while the genetic diversity in self-compatible types has been found to decrease, its genotypes produced around 17-22% more seed. This combined with production of more fruit suggests natural selection as an agent in its prevalence.
