= Saccharum alopecuroides =

Scientific classification
- Kingdom: Plantae
- Clade: Tracheophytes
- Clade: Angiosperms
- Clade: Monocots
- Clade: Commelinids
- Order: Poales
- Family: Poaceae
- Subfamily: Panicoideae
- Genus: Saccharum
- Species: S. alopecuroides

Binomial name
- Saccharum alopecuroides (L.) Nutt.

Species of perennial grass

Saccharum alopecuroides, commonly known as silver plumegrass, is a species of perennial grass found in North America.

== Description ==
Saccharum alopecuroides is a grass species with purplish culms that reach a height of up to 3 m (10 ft) with blades reaching a length of 75 cm (30 in). Panicles are white to brown in color, reaching a length between 15 and 30 cm (0.5 and 1.0 ft), with nodes and internodes that are commonly glabrous. When grain is produced it is ellipsoid in shape, reddish in color, and 2 to 3.5 mm (0.08 to 0.14 in) in length.

This species possesses fibrous roots.

== Distribution and habitat ==
Within the United States, S. alopecuroides can be found from New Jersey to Florida and westward to Texas through Indiana.

This species can be found in environments such as in fields, along and inside woodlands, and along roadsides.
