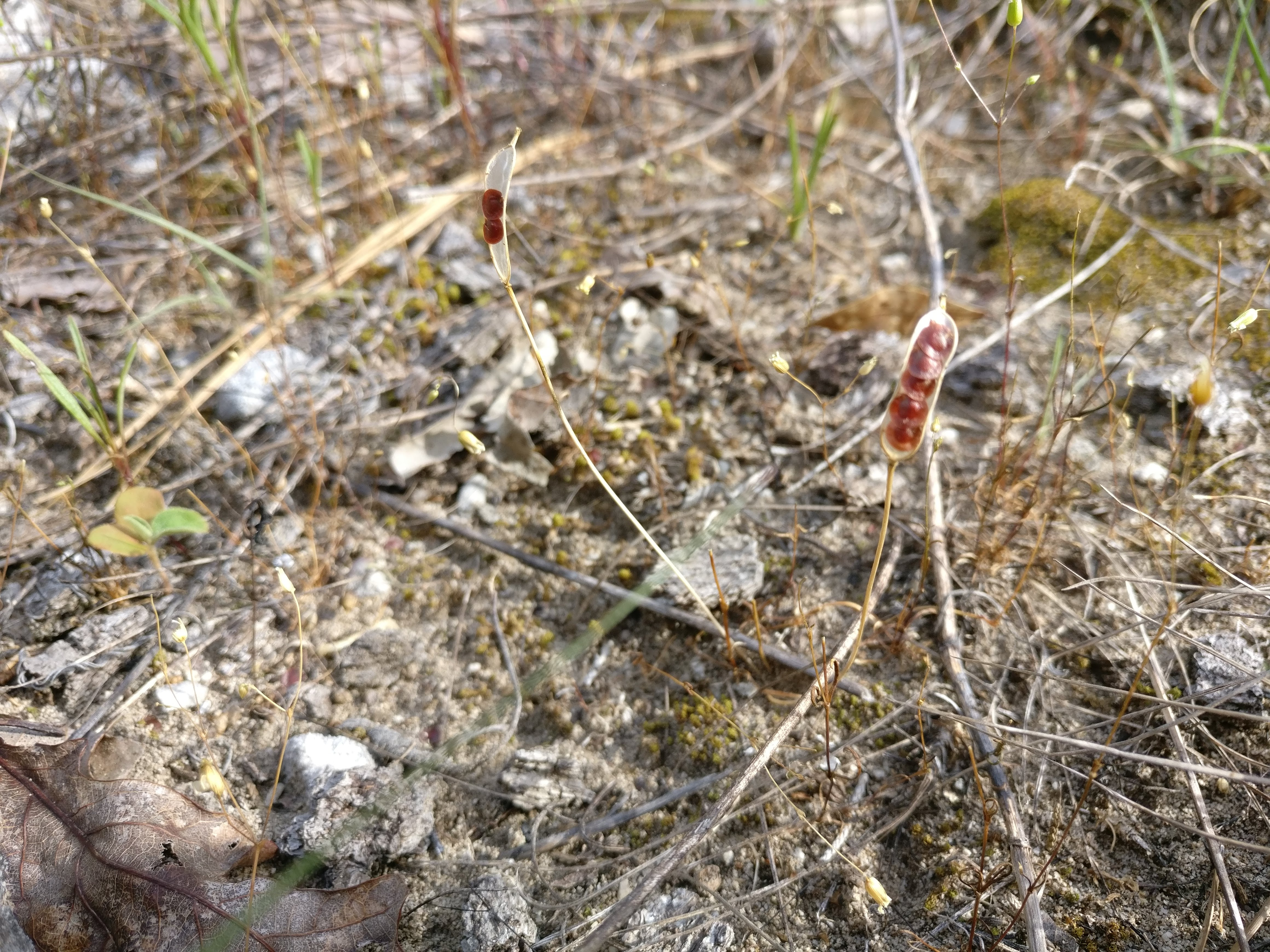
- Dried siliques of Leavenworthia uniflora from Ketona Glades (Dolomite substrate) Alabama

Scientific classification
- Kingdom: Plantae
- Clade: Tracheophytes
- Clade: Angiosperms
- Clade: Eudicots
- Clade: Rosids
- Order: Brassicales
- Family: Brassicaceae
- Genus: Leavenworthia
- Species: L. uniflora

Binomial name
- Leavenworthia uniflora (Michx.) Britton 1894

Synonyms
- Cardamine uniflora Michx. 1803; Leavenworthia michauxii Torrey, superfluous name

= Leavenworthia uniflora =

Species of flowering plant

Leavenworthia uniflora, called Michaux's gladecress or one-flowered gladecress, is a plant species native to the southeastern and Midwestern parts of the United States. It is reported from northwestern Georgia, northern Alabama, Tennessee, northern Arkansas, southern Missouri, Kentucky, southeastern Indiana, southwestern Ohio, and northwestern Virginia. It grows in open, sun-lit locations at elevations less than 500 meters (1700 feet).

Leavenworthia uniflora is an herb up to 20 cm (8 inches) tall. Basal leaves are up to 13 cm (5.2 inches) long, pinnately lobed with 3-10 pairs of lobes. Flowers are solitary, white, up to 6 mm across. Fruits are narrowly oblong, up to 3 cm (1.2 inches) long.
