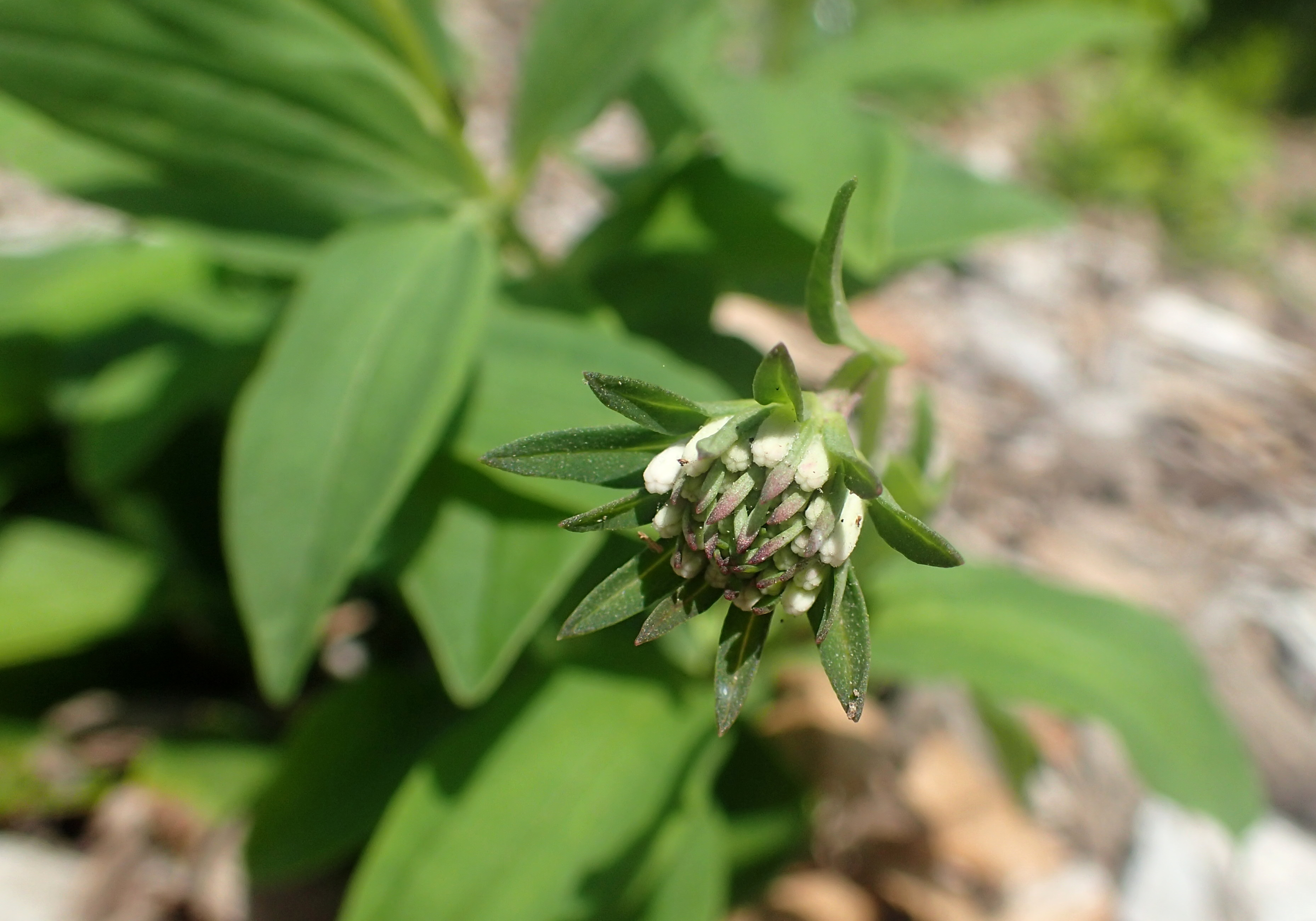
- Marshallia trinervia

Scientific classification
- Kingdom: Plantae
- Clade: Tracheophytes
- Clade: Angiosperms
- Clade: Eudicots
- Clade: Asterids
- Order: Asterales
- Family: Asteraceae
- Subfamily: Asteroideae
- Tribe: Helenieae
- Subtribe: Marshalliinae; H.Rob.
- Genus: Marshallia; Schreb. 1791 not J.F.Gmel. 1791 (Salicaceae)

Synonyms
- Persoonia Michx. 1803, illegitimate name not Sm.1798 (Proteaceae) nor Willd. 1799 (Meliaceae); Trattenikia Pers.; Phyteumopsis Juss. ex Poir.

= Marshallia =

Genus of flowering plants

Marshallia is a genus of plants in the tribe Helenieae within the family Asteraceae. Marshallia is native to the southeastern and south-central United States. A common name applied to most species in the genus is Barbara's buttons.

== Description ==
Marshallia is found in open habitats, such as roadsides, bogs, or open woodlands dominated by pines. Several species are associated with wetlands.

The typical blooming period is late spring (May) and early summer (June or early July). The small white-to-pinkish flowers occur in large, compact, spherical heads Marshallia are very attractive to pollinating insects, including butterflies and various beetles, such as flower chafers of the genus Euphoria.

Species

- Marshallia angustifolia (Michx.) Pursh - TN
- Marshallia caespitosa Nutt. ex DC., puffballs. - TX OK KS MO AR LA
- Marshallia graminifolia (Walt.) Small, grassleaf Barbara's buttons. - TX LA MS AL GA FL SC NC
- †Marshallia grandiflora Beadle & F.E. Boynt., Appalachian Barbara's buttons. - NC
- Marshallia legrandii Weakley, tall Barbara's buttons. - NC, VA
- Marshallia mohrii Beadle & F.E. Boynt, Mohr's Barbara's buttons. - AL GA
- Marshallia obovata (Walt.) Beadle & F.E. Boynt. spoonshape Barbara's buttons. - TN AL GA FL SC NC VA
- Marshallia pulchra W.M. Knapp, D.B. Poind. & Weakley beautiful Barbara’s buttons. - TN KY WV MD PA
- Marshallia ramosa Beadle & F.E.Boynt., southern Barbara's buttons. - FL GA
- Marshallia trinervia (Walt.) Trel., broadleaf Barbara's buttons. - LA MS AL GA SC NC TN

== Conservation ==
One species in the genus, Marshallia grandiflora (Appalachian Barbara's buttons) is extinct, having been wiped out in the early 20th century. It was formerly considered conspecific with Marshallia pulchra (Beautiful Barbara's buttons or Monongahela Barbara's buttons), which is endangered in Kentucky, Pennsylvania, and Tennessee, and has been extirpated in Maryland. That species is found in bogs and scoured riverbanks, and requires periodic flooding to maintain open habitat. Marshallia obovata (Spoonshape Barbara's buttons or Piedmont Barbara's buttons), is listed as endangered in Florida and threatened in Tennessee.

== Etymology ==
The genus name was given by the botanist Schreber (in Genera Plantarum, 1791) to honor the Marshall family, uncle Humphry and nephew Moses, of Pennsylvania. They were botanists of the American colonial period, and cousins of the famous botanists and explorers John and William Bartram.

The origin of the common name "Barbara's buttons" is unknown. The flower heads do resemble buttons, but botanical references giving this name do not quote the Barbara which the name honors (Rickett 1975). The reference is possibly to Saint Barbara, though the association is obscure. Saint Barbara had long hair, and is also associated with lightning—perhaps the individual flowers resemble lightning bolts, or the whole head of flowers resembles Saint Barbara's long locks (Coin 2005). This common name was not, at any rate, widespread in the 19th century. It was not used in Southern Wildflowers and Trees (1901) or Plant Life Of Alabama (1901). The botanist B.W. Wells, in Natural Gardens of North Carolina (1932), called the plants "loudspeakers", referring to the megaphone shape of the individual flowers. The first printed use of the name "Barbara's buttons" is in Small's Manual of the Southeastern Flora (1933).
