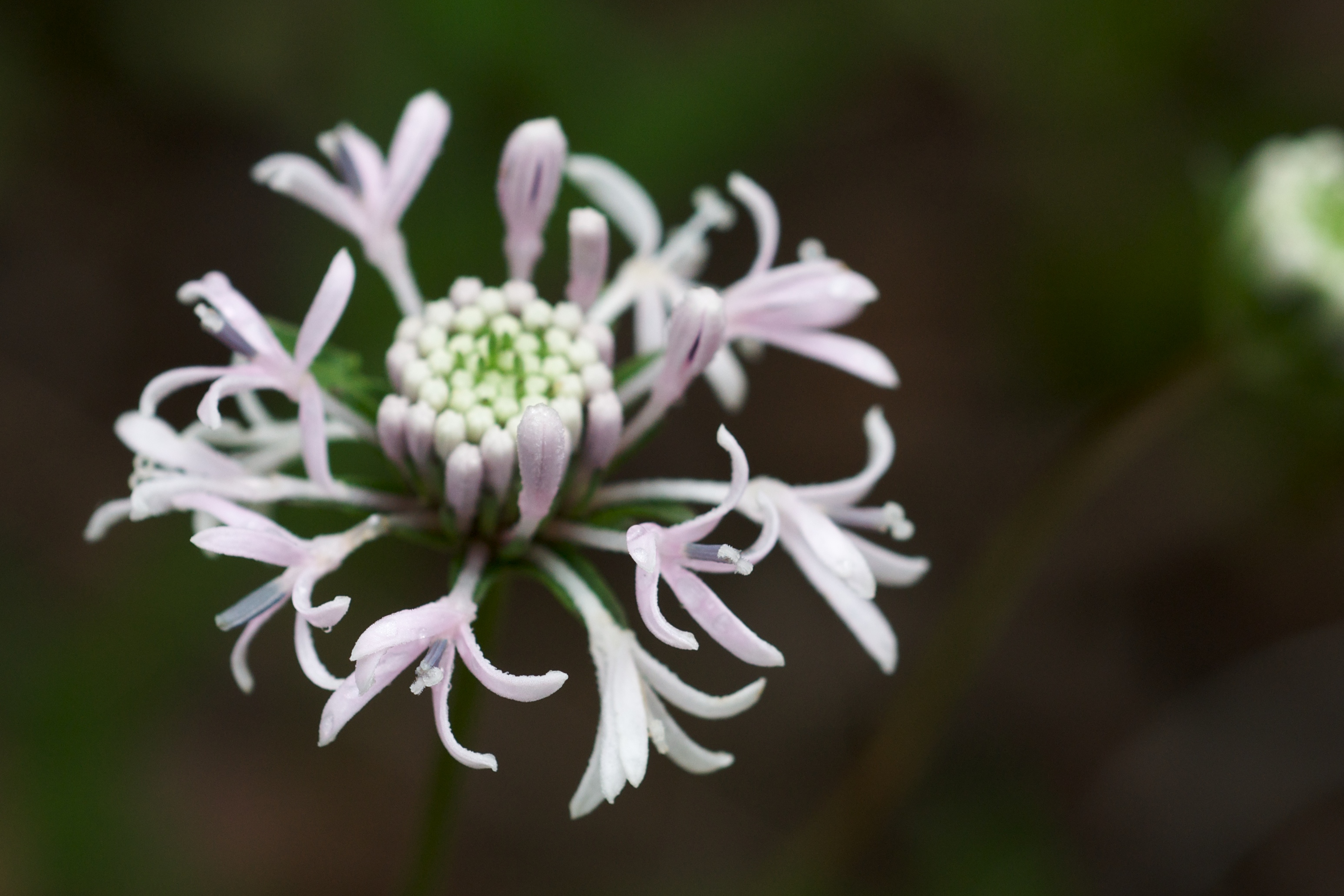

Conservation status
- Threatened (ESA)

Scientific classification
- Kingdom: Plantae
- Clade: Embryophytes
- Clade: Tracheophytes
- Clade: Angiosperms
- Clade: Eudicots
- Clade: Asterids
- Order: Asterales
- Family: Asteraceae
- Genus: Marshallia
- Species: M. mohrii

Binomial name
- Marshallia mohrii Beadle & F.E.Boynton

= Marshallia mohrii =

Species of flowering plant

Marshallia mohrii, or Mohr's Barbara's buttons or Coosa Barbara's buttons, is a perennial herb species, endemic to the Southeastern United States, in several locations in Alabama, Georgia, and Florida. The first recorded discovery of the species was in 1882 by Dr. Charles Mohr, hence the botanical species name and common name.

Mohr's Barbara's buttons is currently listed as threatened on the Endangered Species List, and has been since 1988.

== Description ==
Marshallia mohrii grows to around 1–2.5 ft in height, with 2.5 cm wide tubular-shaped flowers found in 2-6 flower masses. The flowers can range in color from white, to pale pink or lavender. The leaves of the plant are lanceolate to ovate in shape, ranging from 6–10 cm long and 2 cm wide, with three parallel veins. The leaves are larger and more numerous near the base of the stem. (Patrick, Krakow, 1995)

The plant typically flowers from mid-May through June, with fruit being produced in July and August. (Tsao, Van Lonkhuyzen, 2000) The fruit is a 5-angled, 10-ribbed achene, about 4 mm long, with a hairy, resin-dotted surface. The fruit is topped by a crown (pappus) of five, narrowly triangular, sharply pointed scales, which are 1–3 mm long. The fruits are found among the sharply pointed bracts (chaff), which persist on the flower head. (Patrick, Krakow, 1995)

== Habitat ==
The Mohr's Barbara's buttons, Marshallia mohrii, requires wet, sandy clay soils, with alkaline pH, and high organic matter. Most currently known populations occur on soils of the Conasauga-Firestone Association. (Alabama Power Company, 2007) This is typically found along shale-bedded streams, especially in seasonally moist forest gaps, and in low swales extending onto roadside rights-of-way. Mohr's Barbara Button can survive in full sun or partial shade, often in association with grass-sedge communities. Two other endangered species have the same habitat requirements as the Mohr's Barbara Button: The Alabama Leather-Flower (Clematis socialis) and the Green Pitcher Plant (Sarracenia oreophila) are both listed as endangered, and occupy the same limited habitat. (Alabama Power Company, 2007)

== Conservation ==
=== Threats ===
Mohr's Barbara's buttons suffers primarily from habitat loss due to residential development, wildfires, road maintenance and enlargement, trash disposal, and to a small extent, agricultural development. Because the environments in which Mohr's Barbara's buttons exists are typically alkaline, sandy soils, crop production is not typically favorable in these environments.

Although direct human destruction of habitat can be blamed for population declines, too much human influence in protecting it can be problematic as well. Fire suppression in the pine and oak forests of the southeast United States has also taken its toll on the Mohr's Barbara's buttons. Although the species requires mature pine and oak forests to survive, without occasional fires, the glades and openings required by the species become overgrown with forest vegetation. Therefore, the trees and habitat needed by the Mohr's Barbara's buttons, and protected through fire suppression can become a major problem as well for the species. (Matthews, 1994)

Another risk many species face, especially plant species, is habitat fragmentation. As habitat gets destroyed, it is common that individual populations get isolated from each other. As populations get isolated from each other, and members of differing populations cannot interact, the genetic variation within populations starts to decrease. If populations are not able to interact for many generations, a loss of genetic diversity with populations, and the species as a whole become a very real problem. Luckily, habitat fragmentation and a lack of genetic variation is not a problem for Mohr's Barbara Button, as the species has more variation than most others in its environment. Also, the genetic variation within populations is greater than amongst populations. (Jolls)

=== Protection methods ===
There are many stakeholders involved in protecting the Mohr's Barbara's buttons. The calcareous glades necessary for the survival of Mohr's Barbara's buttons used to be fairly common and widespread. Currently, the remaining areas predominantly exist on private land, with none on federally protected land. Therefore, landowners are one of the most important stakeholders involved. But, government and private organizations in charge of protecting plant species need to educate and work with private landowners to ensure the protection and survival of the habitat required for Mohr's Barbara's buttons.

Government organizations are also necessary to protect habitat, as road construction and urban development is a major cause of habitat destruction. Therefore, an adequate examination of the land should occur prior to zoning, construction and/or development. Also, even if the land is safe from construction or development, it has to be protected from the effects of human population. Garbage and waste disposal can pollute and destroy critical habitat, as well as over-use by grazing livestock.

Presently, the Nature Conservancy has purchased several areas with calcareous glades and marly prairies, to ensure the survival of the Mohr's Barbara's buttons and those endangered species that occupy the same habitat. They are also working with landowners to protect those areas that are found on private land. (Schotz, 2001) Through habitat protection by private and public sectors, the Mohr's Barbara's buttons and other endangered species can survive and flourish for future generations.

Because some populations have become established in road right-of-ways and ditches, it is important to check road ditches before mowing or construction. This ensures no populations that have established in road right-of-ways are destroyed. Simply not mowing an area of roadside will not detract from the aesthetics of an area, and will protect valuable individuals/populations.

==== Reasons to protect ====
The Mohr's Barbara's buttons is a wildflower endemic to the United States. Protecting habitat does not require setting aside large tracts of valuable land. The land its habitat primarily occupies is low in value, and not highly desired for agricultural production.

Since the Mohr's Barbara's buttons is a plant, it cannot migrate to another area that is more suitable, or safer. For this reason, Mohr's Barbara's buttons, as with most plants, is susceptible to major population loss due to habitat degradation or destruction. Therefore, humans need to protect the environments these plants require to survive. Since Mohr's Barbara's buttons has a very distinct and limited habitat, it is vital to protect these habitats as a whole, as they are important to several other threatened and endangered species as well.
