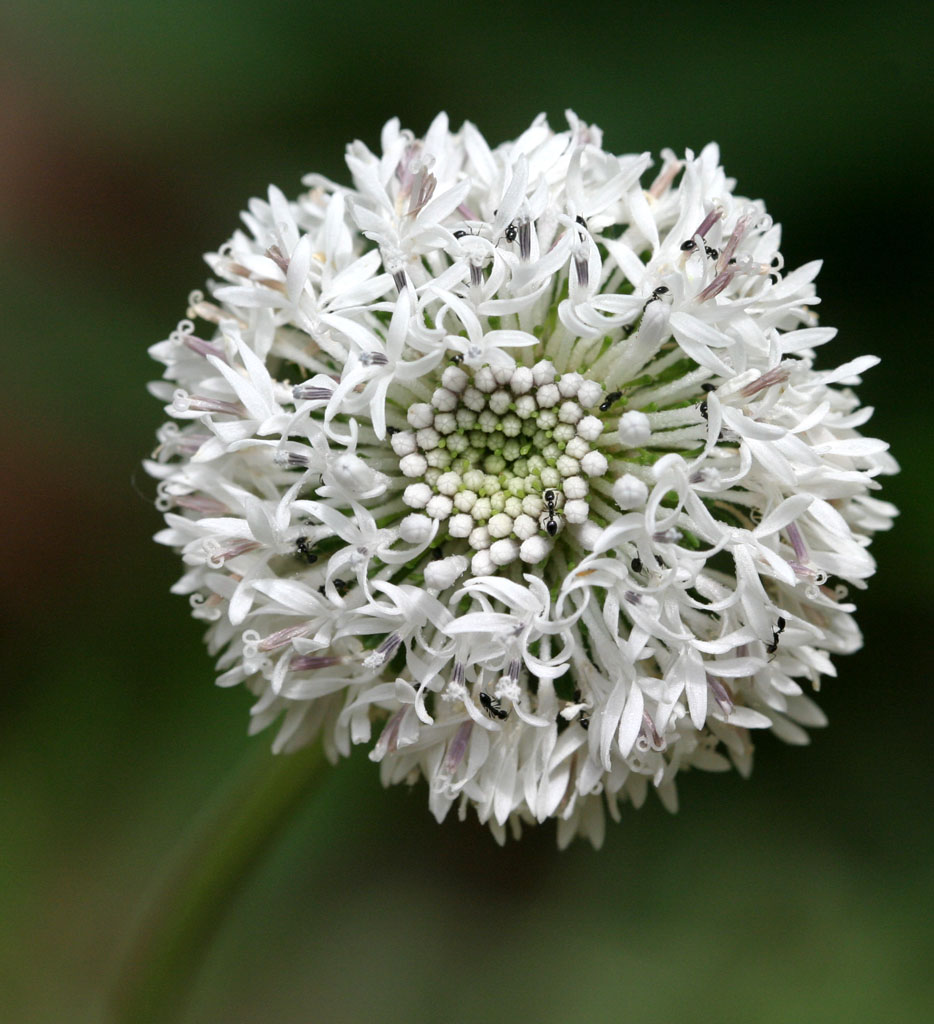

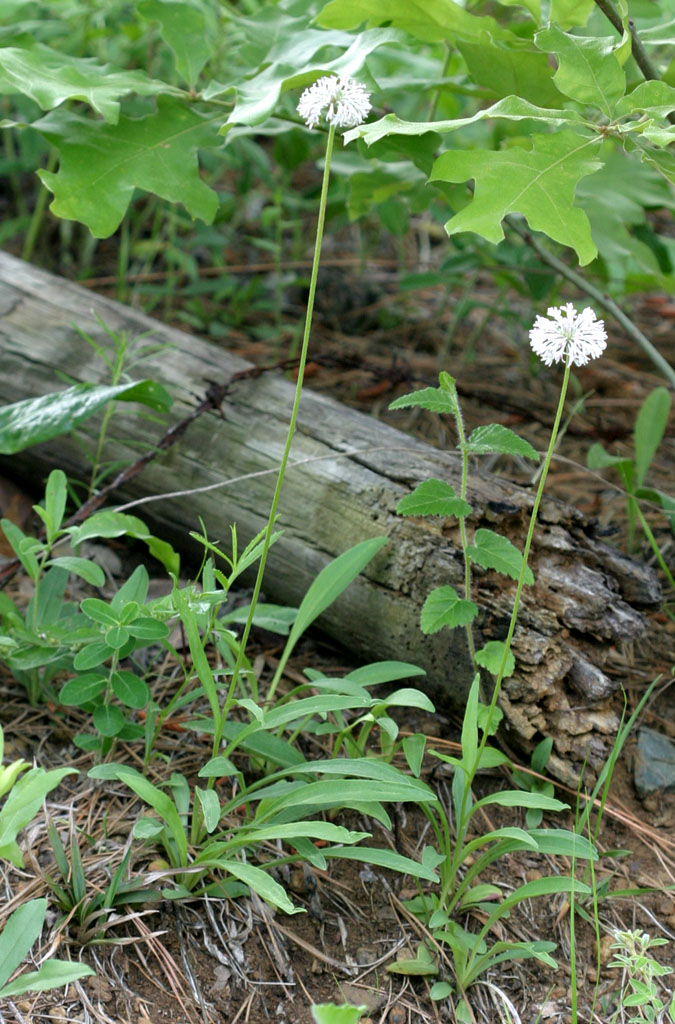
- Plant

Scientific classification
- Kingdom: Plantae
- Clade: Tracheophytes
- Clade: Angiosperms
- Clade: Eudicots
- Clade: Asterids
- Order: Asterales
- Family: Asteraceae
- Genus: Marshallia
- Species: M. obovata

Binomial name
- Marshallia obovata (Walter) Beadle & F.E.Boynton

= Marshallia obovata =

Species of flowering plant

Marshallia obovata, also known as spoon-leaved Barbara's buttons, spoonshape Barbara's buttons and Piedmont Barbara's buttons, is a flowering plant species in the family Asteraceae. It is endemic to the Southern United States, especially in the state of North Carolina.

== Description ==
It has white blooms. The stems grow to 2 feet tall.
