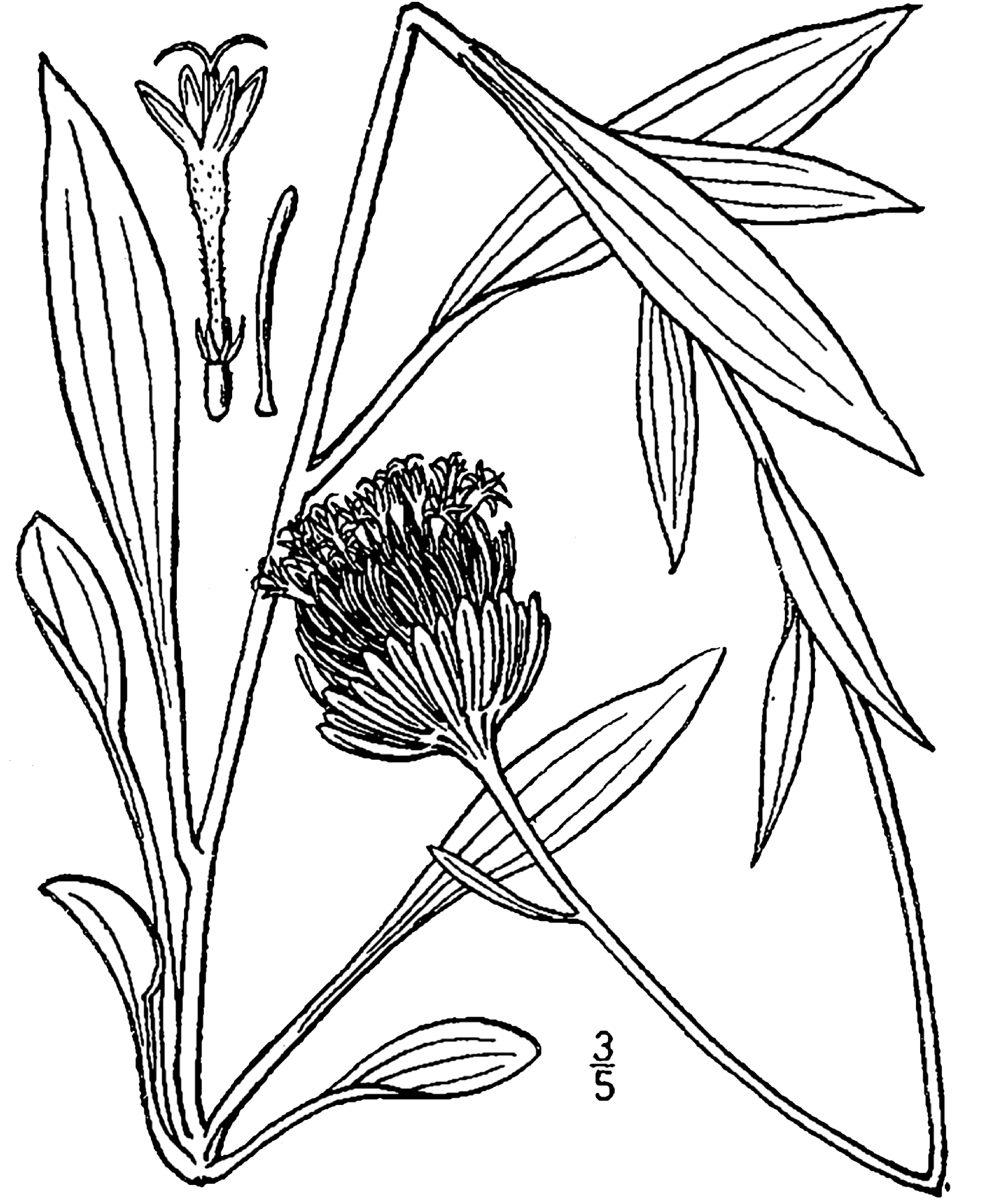
- 1913 illustration

Conservation status
- Presumed Extinct (NatureServe)

Scientific classification
- Kingdom: Plantae
- Clade: Tracheophytes
- Clade: Angiosperms
- Clade: Eudicots
- Clade: Asterids
- Order: Asterales
- Family: Asteraceae
- Genus: Marshallia
- Species: M. grandiflora

Binomial name
- Marshallia grandiflora Beadle & F.E.Boynton 1901

= Marshallia grandiflora =

Extinct species of flowering plant

Marshallia grandiflora, the Appalachian Barbara's buttons, is an extinct species of flowering plant in the genus Marshallia within the sunflower family. It was endemic to the Blue Ridge Mountains of North Carolina in the Eastern United States, in Henderson and Polk counties. It was found primarily along gravelly and sandy bars along high-gradient rivers, and was presumably wiped out due to changes in this restricted habitat. It was last sighted in 1919.

Marshallia grandiflora was an herb up to 90 cm (3 feet) tall. Most of the leaves were clustered around the base of the stem. One plant would produce one or two heads, each head containing pink disc flowers but no ray flowers.

It was formerly considered conspecific with M. pulchra, the beautiful Barbara's buttons or Monongahela Barbara's buttons, which is endemic to the central Appalachia region from southwestern Pennsylvania to eastern Tennessee, with the largest population occurs along the Gauley River in West Virginia. A 2020 study found the two populations to represent distinct species, and thus only the North Carolina population was kept in M. grandiflora, with the Central Appalachian populations being reclassified into the new species M. pulchra. Both species are closely related to one another and to M. legrandii. M. pulchra is also threatened by changes to its habitat.
