= Charles Boynton =

Charles Boynton may refer to:

- Charles Lawrence Boynton (1864–1943), American botanist
- Charles Albert Boynton (1867–1954), U.S. federal judge
- Charles B. Boynton (1806–1883), president of Howard University and chaplain of the United States House of Representatives
- Charles F. Boynton (1906–1999), bishop of the Episcopal Diocese of Puerto Rico
- Charles Boynton Knapp (born 1946), president of the University of Georgia
