= Judge Junius G. Adams House =

Historic house in North Carolina, United States

- U.S. National Register of Historic Places
- Location within North Carolina Location within the United States
- Location: 11 Stuyvesant Rd., Biltmore Forest, North Carolina
- Coordinates: 35°32′9″N 82°32′14″W
- Area: 5.5 acres (2.2 ha)
- Built: 1921
- Architect: Parker, Charles N.
- Architectural style: Tudor Revival
- NRHP reference No.: 01001077
- Added to NRHP: October 5, 2001

Judge Junius G. Adams House is a historic home located at 11 Stuyvesant Road, Biltmore Forest, Buncombe County, North Carolina. It was built in 1921, and is a two-story, rectangular plan, Tudor Revival-style dwelling. It has rough-faced stone veneer on the first story and false half-timbering on the second, with a slate gable roof. Also on the property is a contributing gardener's residence (1931) and tool shed (1931).

It was listed on the National Register of Historic Places in 2001.
