= Marshallia angustifolia =

- Marshallia angustifolia in bloom
- Phyllaries of Marshallia angustifolia

Conservation status
- Apparently Secure (NatureServe)

Scientific classification
- Kingdom: Plantae
- Clade: Tracheophytes
- Clade: Angiosperms
- Clade: Eudicots
- Clade: Asterids
- Order: Asterales
- Family: Asteraceae
- Genus: Marshallia
- Species: M. angustifolia

Binomial name
- Marshallia angustifolia (Michaux) Pursh.

Species of flowering plant

Marshallia angustifolia, also known as the Gulf Coast Barbara's-buttons, is a species of perennial herb in the sunflower family (Asteraceae). It is endemic to pine savannas and seepage bogs along the Gulf Coast of the United States, with a disjunct historical collection from Tennessee.
