= Gunston Hall (Biltmore Forest, North Carolina) =

Historic house in North Carolina, United States

- U.S. National Register of Historic Places
- U.S. Historic district
- Location within North Carolina Location within the United States
- Location: 324 Vanderbilt Rd., Biltmore Forest, North Carolina
- Coordinates: 35°32′50″N 82°32′11″W
- Area: 11.3 acres (4.6 ha)
- Built: 1923
- Built by: Merchant, Luther L.
- Architect: Wood, Waddy B.; Beadle, Chauncey Delos; Dennis, Lola Anderson
- Architectural style: Colonial Revival
- NRHP reference No.: 91001505
- Added to NRHP: October 24, 1991

Gunston Hall, also known as Franklin Hall, is a historic estate and a national historic district located at Biltmore Forest, Buncombe County, North Carolina. The district encompasses five contributing buildings, one contributing site, and two contributing structures. The main house was designed by architect Waddy Butler Wood and built in 1923. It is a five-part Colonial Revival style dwelling consisting of a 1 1/2-story main block flanked by hyphens and 1 1/2-story wings. The grounds were designed by noted landscape architects Chauncey Beadle and Lola Anderson Dennis. Other contributing elements are the Grounds and Garden (1920-c. 1955), the Breezeway (c. 1950), Gazebo (c. 1955), Tool Shed/Potting Shed (c. 1951), Greenhouse (c. 1954), Garden Shed (c. 1951), and Entrance Piers and Gates (1923). The estate was built by Dr. William Beverley Mason, a great-great grandson of George Mason, who built Gunston Hall (1759).

It was listed on the National Register of Historic Places in 1991 but is now a private residence.
