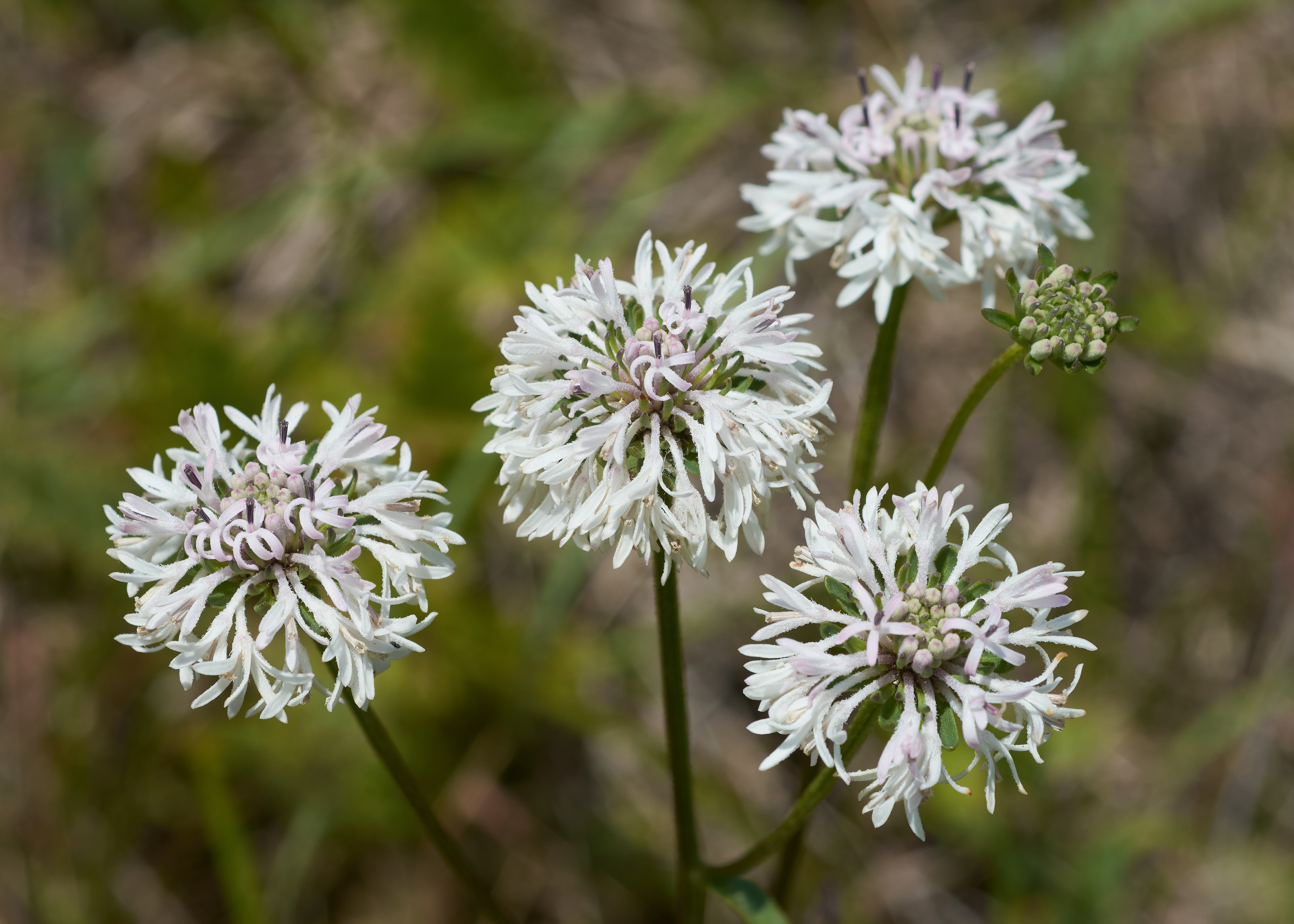

Scientific classification
- Kingdom: Plantae
- Clade: Embryophytes
- Clade: Tracheophytes
- Clade: Spermatophytes
- Clade: Angiosperms
- Clade: Eudicots
- Clade: Asterids
- Order: Asterales
- Family: Asteraceae
- Genus: Marshallia
- Species: M. caespitosa

Binomial name
- Marshallia caespitosa Nutt. ex DC.

= Marshallia caespitosa =

Species of flowering plant

Marshallia caespitosa, commonly called puffballs is a species of plant in the family Asteraceae that is native to the south-central United States.

== Morphology ==
M. caespitosa is a perennial that blooms from late May to early June. The stems are herbaceous with skinny, oblong basal leaves and white to pink-tinged flowers.

They are found growing alongside hills, on shale barrens, and rocky limestone outcrops.
