= Rock Cliff Farm =

Historic farm in North Carolina, United States

- U.S. National Register of Historic Places
- U.S. Historic district
- Location within North Carolina Location within the United States
- Location: western end of Bent Rd., near Wake Forest, North Carolina
- Coordinates: 35°59′59″N 78°38′47″W
- Area: 83.4 acres (33.8 ha)
- Built: 1950
- Built by: Wells, Bertram Whittier
- Architectural style: Triple-A house
- NRHP reference No.: 07000879
- Added to NRHP: August 29, 2007

Rock Cliff Farm, also known as the B.W. Wells Farm, is a historic farm and national historic district located near Wake Forest, Wake County, North Carolina. The property is owned by the Federal government, and part of a large acreage managed by the State of North Carolina as the Falls Lake State Recreation Area. Contributing resources include the Grounds of Rock Cliff Farm, Ray-Wells House (c. 1895, c. 1954), meathouse (c. 1885-1890), Lowery-Ray Cemetery (1901), studio (1954, c. 1955-1960), lumber storage rack (c. 1954-1955), Ray House (c. 1900-1920), and Ray House Outbuilding (c. 1900-1920). Rock Cliff Farm was the retirement residence of Dr. Bertram Whittier Wells (1884-1978), a noted American botanist and ecologist active.

The district was listed on the National Register of Historic Places in 2007.
