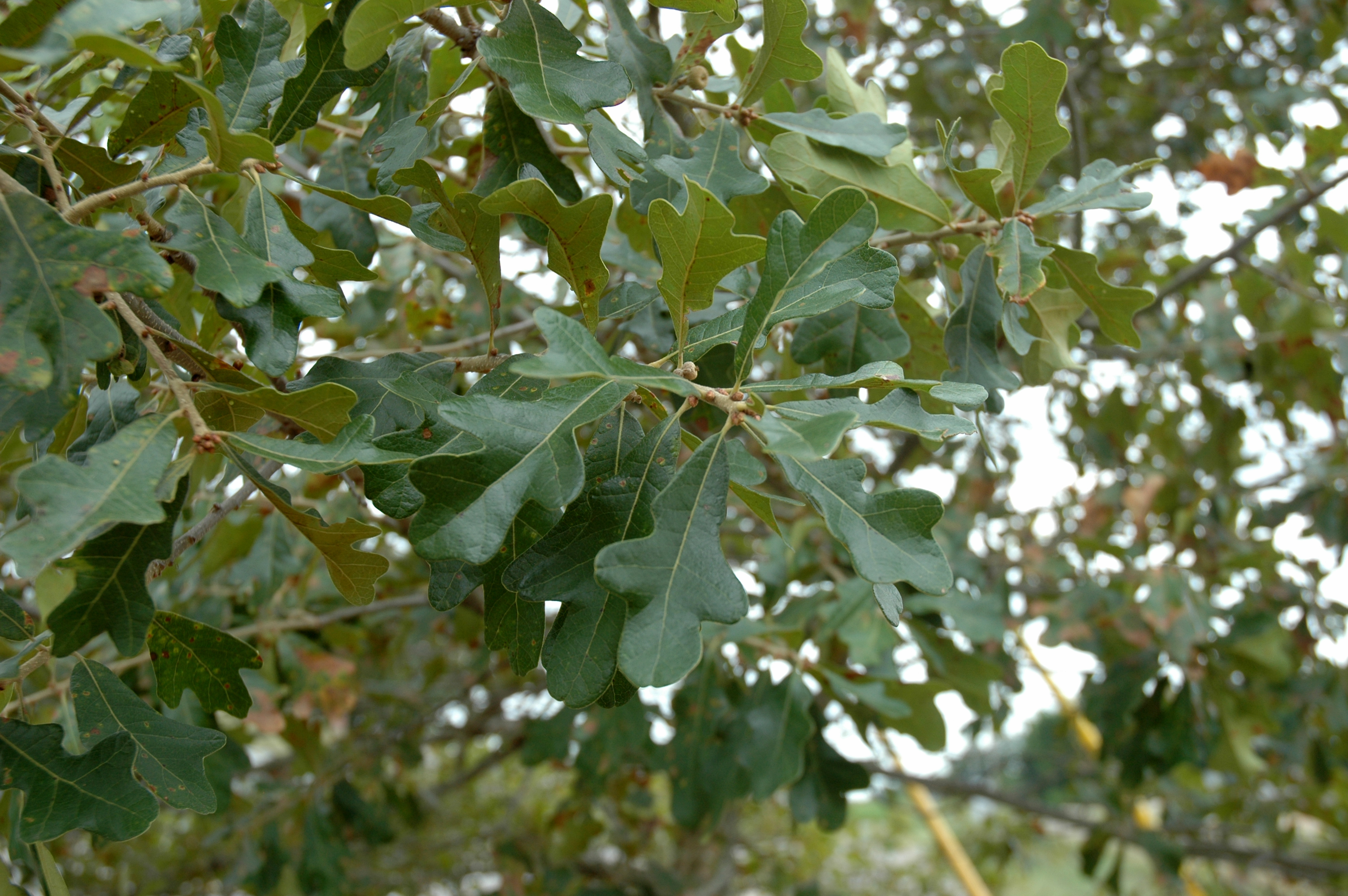

Conservation status
- Critically Endangered (IUCN 3.1)

Scientific classification
- Kingdom: Plantae
- Clade: Embryophytes
- Clade: Tracheophytes
- Clade: Spermatophytes
- Clade: Angiosperms
- Clade: Eudicots
- Clade: Rosids
- Order: Fagales
- Family: Fagaceae
- Genus: Quercus
- Subgenus: Quercus subg. Quercus
- Section: Quercus sect. Quercus
- Species: Q. boyntonii

Binomial name
- Quercus boyntonii Beadle

Synonyms
- Quercus stellata var. boyntonii (Beadle) Sarg.

= Quercus boyntonii =

Species of oak tree

Quercus boyntonii is a rare North American species of oak in the beech family. At present, it is found only in nine counties in central Alabama, although historical records say that it formerly grew in Texas as well. It is commonly called the Boynton sand post oak, Boynton oak, or Alabama sandstone oak.

Quercus boyntonii is a rare and poorly known species. It is a shrub or small tree, sometimes reach a height of 6 meters (20 feet) but usually smaller. Leaves are dark green, hairless and shiny on the upper surface, covered with many gray hairs on the underside. The oak grows along glade margins on sandstone outcrops in the pine-oak-hickory woodland. The tree is threatened by fire suppression, land use changes, invasive competition (including Pyrus calleryana, Nandina, and privet), and introgression with other oaks.
