= Bertram Whittier Wells =

American botanist (1884–1978)

Bertram Whittier (B.W.) Wells (1884–1978) was an American botanist and ecologist active in North Carolina. His most influential work was Natural Gardens of North Carolina (1932).

During his long and active life, B. W. (Bertram Whittier) Wells (1884–1978) was keenly interested in the study and preservation of North Carolina's unique landscape. He spent time studying the Big Savannah in North Carolina's Pender County, a spot he made famous in his publications on "natural gardens." Wells also, unsuccessfully, worked to save the Big Savannah from development. In 2002, a similar ecological site was dedicated to Wells's memory. Wells's concern for the environment was evidenced in his teaching and work as the head of North Carolina State College's (later North Carolina State University) Botany Department, his writing, and his personal involvement in botanical and environmental associations. James R. Troyer rightly titled his book about Wells Nature's Champion.

Born in 1884, in Troy, Ohio, Wells studied botany at Ohio State University, received his doctorate at the University of Chicago, and taught at a number of universities before he came to North Carolina State College in 1919. Wells headed the Botany Department from 1919 to 1949 and continued teaching until his retirement in 1954. During his thirty-five years at North Carolina State, Wells had a significant impact on scientific study. His research interests included the insect galls of plants, the effects of salt on coastal vegetation, Bald Head Island vegetation, and the possible formation by meteorites of the Carolina Bays, in the eastern part of the state. Wells was also a vocal advocate of the teaching of evolution in the 1920s and helped to prevent the legislature from banning it in the public schools. His botanical interests led him to write a book titled The Natural Gardens of North Carolina. Originally written in 1932 and published with the help of the North Carolina Garden Club, the book is still in print from University of North Carolina Press. It provides an account of North Carolina plant life and has a particularly forward-looking position on ecology, advocating the study of plants in their natural environments.

Wells had a profound love for his retirement property, called Rock Cliff Farm, located on a bend in the Neuse River. In the 1970s, the Falls of the Neuse Reservoir submerged much of the property and the famed Ziegle's Rock. The property was subsumed within the Falls Lake State Recreation Area, where, in cooperation with the B. W. Wells Association and the U.S. Army Corps of Engineers, the homestead has been preserved. Initially conceived by the B. W. Wells Association as the Rockcliff Farm Interpretive Area (later called the B. W. Wells Home and Interpretive Area), the site is used to educate the public about B.W. Wells and promote his conservation ethics. Rock Cliff Farm is owned by the Federal government, and part of a large acreage managed by the State of North Carolina as the Falls Lake State Recreation Area. It was listed on the National Register of Historic Places in 2007.

The Rockcliff Farm property, home, and personally constructed art studio provided Wells with an ideal setting in which to cultivate his interest in painting. Although his love for art had been lifelong and he had been involved in the McLean Mural controversy during his years at State, Wells began teaching himself to paint in his 70s. Although he never sold any artwork, he frequently gave it to friends, and a number of pieces are on exhibit at the Wells historical site. Wells's second wife Maude Barnes Wells, who died in 2001, shared his love of the property. Wells's first wife, Edna Metz Wells, who died in 1938, was a respected local teacher and was honored with a Wake County, North Carolina, park named in her honor.

Although Wells died in December 1978, his contributions, particularly in North Carolina, have engendered a devoted following for his life and work. In addition to J. R. Troyer's biography of Wells, there remains a B. W. Wells Association to administer the historic site and site of his former property, as well as to pass on his botanical knowledge and environmental interests to new generations.

James R. Troyer gathered much of the material in this collection during his preparation for the book, Nature's Champion: B. W. Wells, Tar Heel Ecologist. Born in Goshen, Indiana, in 1929, Troyer received his B.A. at DePauw University, his M.A. at Ohio State University, and his Ph.D. in botany at Columbia University, in 1954. After teaching at Yale University until 1957, Troyer began his career at North Carolina State College as an assistant professor of botany. During his 38 years at State, Troyer became a full professor with a focus on plant physiology and the history of botany, particularly in North Carolina. He has held the position of Emeritus Professor of Botany since 1995.
