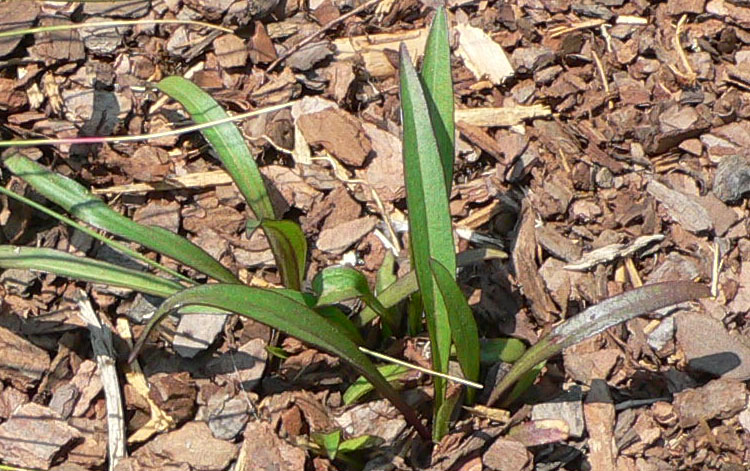

Conservation status
- Apparently Secure (NatureServe)

Scientific classification
- Kingdom: Plantae
- Clade: Tracheophytes
- Clade: Angiosperms
- Clade: Eudicots
- Clade: Asterids
- Order: Asterales
- Family: Asteraceae
- Genus: Marshallia
- Species: M. graminifolia

Binomial name
- Marshallia graminifolia (Walter) Small

= Marshallia graminifolia =

Species of flowering plant

Marshallia graminifolia is a perennial herb species, endemic to the coastal plains of the Southern United States, where it often grows in bogs and in sunny locations. Like all species in the genus Marshallia, it has the common name Barbara's buttons, and is specifically known as grassleaf Barbara's buttons. It has fragrant flowers.

M. graminifolia has two accepted subspecies, M. graminifolia subsp. graminifolia, and M. graminifolia subsp. tenuifolia (commonly known as narrowleaf Barbara's buttons or slim leaf Barbara's buttons).

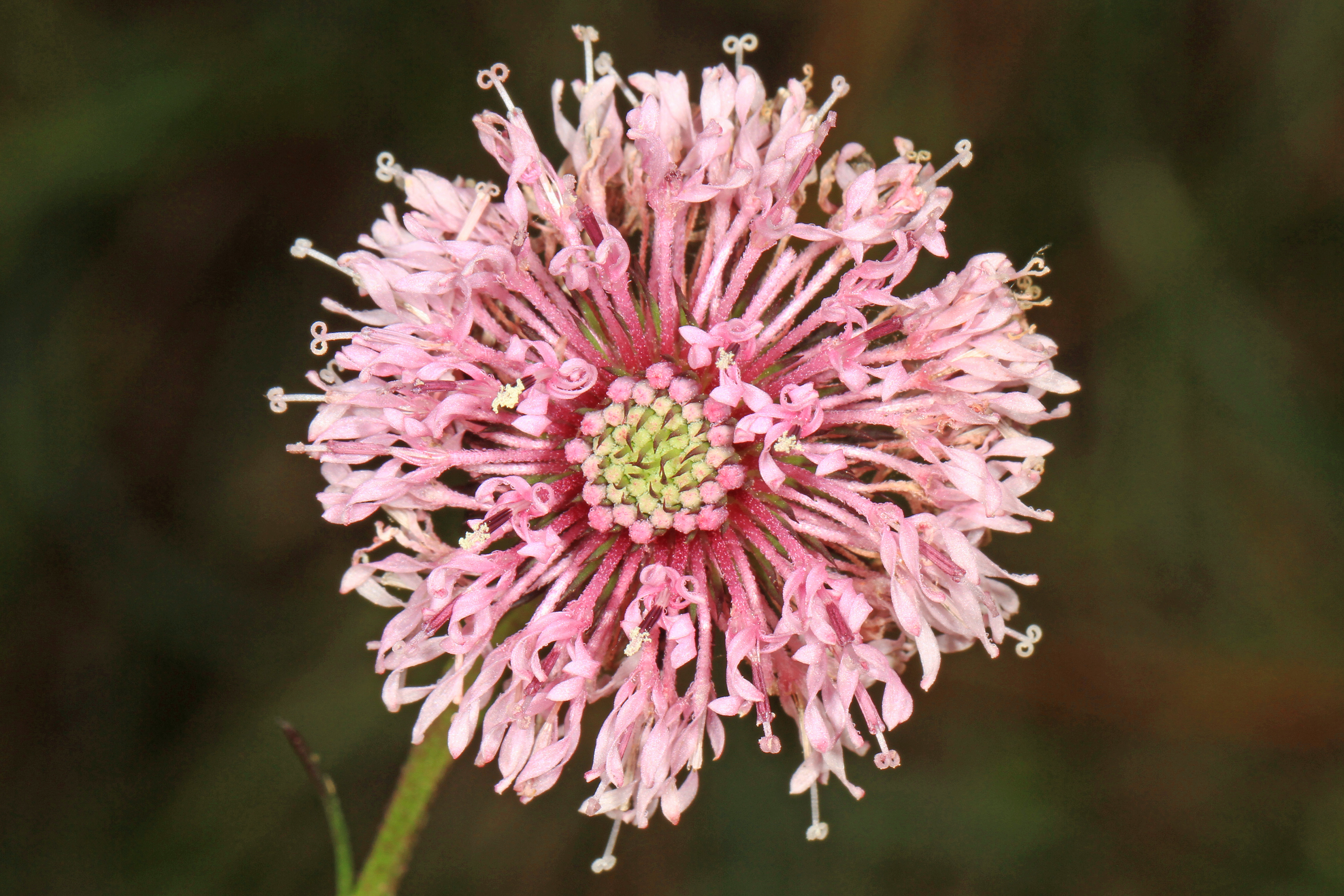
Flower at Green Swamp Preserve in Supply, North Carolina

M. graminifolia subsp. tenuifolia grows in moist sandy habitats, such as bogs, wet savannahs and low pine woods in the south-east coastal areas of the United States, from the south coast of Georgia along the gulf coast into east Texas. It has a deep taproot, lavender to white flowers and an achene fruit.
