= Charles Lawrence Boynton =

American botanist (1864–1943)

- Born: February 7, 1864; Vineland, New Jersey
- Died: September 16, 1943 (aged 79); Lodi, California
- Scientific career
- Fields: Botany
- Workplaces: Biltmore Estate
- Author abbrev. (botany): C.L.Boynton

Charles Lawrence Boynton (February 7, 1864 – September 16, 1943) was an American botanist active in the Southeastern United States, working at Biltmore Estate with Chauncey Beadle and his brother, Frank Ellis Boynton. The oak species Quercus boyntonii was named after him .

The standard author abbreviation C.L.Boynton is used to indicate this person as the author when citing a botanical name.
