= James Mangum House =

Historic house in North Carolina, United States

- U.S. National Register of Historic Places
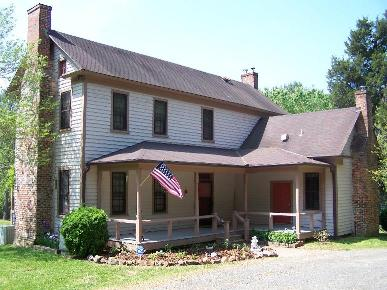

- Location within North Carolina Location within the United States
- Location: Southwest of Durham off NC 751, near Creedmoor, North Carolina
- Coordinates: 36°01′22″N 78°41′58″W
- Area: 5 acres (2.0 ha)
- Built: 1838
- Architectural style: Federal
- NRHP reference No.: 74001379
- Added to NRHP: November 18, 1974

The James Mangum House is a historic home located near Creedmoor, Wake County, North Carolina. Built in 1838, it is an example of Federal architecture. In November 1974, the James Mangum House was listed on the National Register of Historic Places.

The house stands on the eastern shore of Beaverdam Lake in northwestern Wake County, North Carolina. In the 1970s, the U.S. Army Corps of Engineers (USACE) acquired the house and land for inclusion in the Beaverdam Recreation Area of the Falls Lake State Recreation Area. The house went through extensive rehabilitation as well as an archeological survey of the immediate grounds by the USACE. In 1992, the NC Division of Parks and Recreation took control of the house as part of Beaverdam Recreation Area.

== History ==
Referred to by many locals as the Sandling House or Mangum-Sandling House, the James Mangum House is a large, two-story farmhouse, one room deep, with an off-center hall. A one-story section on the north comprises an ell that houses the kitchen. The interior of the house features extensive use of a vernacular Greek Revival-style of woodworking, particularly in the mantel pieces. Architecturally (and perhaps archaeologically) the Mangum House and farmstead represent a significant remnant of the region's antebellum rural history.

In 1874 (some evidence suggests the house was built between 1824 and 1844), Brigadier General James Manuel Mangum (1796–1854) and his wife, Lydia Ferrell Mangum (1790–1874), built the house on Little Beaverdam Creek (present-day Beaverdam Lake, part of the Falls Lake Reservoir Project). It is a two-story farm house that at one time sat on just over 1,000 acres (400 ha) of farmland. It is believed that the house may have been built on land that Lydia inherited from her father, land which became James' property upon their marriage.

According to General Mangum's last will and testament, all his land and holdings were to be used by his widow, Lydia, with the exception of "the negros" which were to be divided among his children; and upon her death, to be divided up and sold at auction. Lydia, however, lived for another 20 years, until 1874. The final disposition of the General's property would not take place until 40 years after his death.

A man by the name of Henry Kearney Sandling (1831–1892) bought one tract of land on Beaverdam creek on the north side of the Fishdam Road. Known as the house tract, Henry paid $6.76 per acre ($3751.80) for the land. This tract contained the house and all the other outbuildings.

Henry fought for the Confederacy during the Civil War. He enlisted as a private in Company I, 55th North Carolina Infantry Regiment on July 14, 1862, at the age of 32. He fought at the Battle of Gettysburg and was wounded on the first day of the battle, July 1, 1863. He was hospitalized and then transferred to a prison at Point Lookout, Maryland. He was paroled on May 27, 1864, and exchanged on April 30, 1863, at City Point, Virginia. Henry was then furloughed May 8, 1864.

Henry had been married to Mary Elizabeth Jeffreys (1831–1927) for 20 years when he bought the Mangum house. They had 14 children, and for the next century, these children, their children, and their children in turn occupied the house until it was bought by the U.S. Army Corps of Engineers as part of the Falls Lake Reservoir Project.

As part of her widow's dower, Mary Elizabeth Sandling received the house and the house tract on January 31, 1893. According to family legend, sometime in the 1920s Mary had become very hard of hearing. A friend who was visiting one day heard Mary say "I believe I hear thunder." Upon investigating the source of the "thunder," Mary's friend found that the west face chimney had partially collapsed. The Masons who repaired the chimney set a plaque into it that reads "M.E. Sandling 1925 J.W.N." Mary occupied the house until her death in 1927.

William David Sandling (1867–1931), the son of Henry and Mary, inherited the house. Family tradition holds that Will was a local justice of the peace who often held court sessions in the Mangum house. For more formal hearings, he sat behind a desk in the southeastern corner of the parlor, a first-floor room on the east side of the house. Informal hearings were held on the porch. Will married Zelma Augusta Bailey, the great-granddaughter of General James Mangum. Will lived in the house until his death in 1931.

After Will's death, the land on which the house sat was sold to Alvin Turner, a grandson of Henry and Mary. Alvin's mother was Anna Sandling (Turner), Henry and Mary's 9th child.

Soon after, the house was turned over to Ben Sandling. Ben was also a grandson of Henry and Mary Sandling (son of Robert Caswell Sandling, 14th child of Henry and Mary). When Ben died, he left the house to his wife, Audrey Bailey Sandling (1920's to present). Audrey was the last of the Sandling family to live in the house. She visited the house periodically until her death in 2009.

Today the house is part of Falls Lake State Recreation Area. It is a private residence that is not open to the public.

== See also ==
- List of Registered Historic Places in North Carolina
