= Alice Lounsberry =

American botanist and author

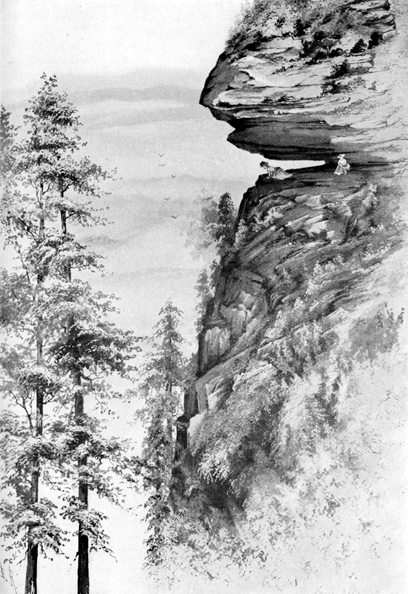
Alice Lounsberry and Ellis Rowan explore Caesar's Head, South Carolina. From Southern Wildflowers and Trees.

Alice Lounsberry (6 November 1868 – 21 November 1949, both in New York City) was an American botanist and author active in the United States during the late 19th and early 20th centuries. Some sources give her birth year as 1872. She worked closely with the Australian botanical artist Ellis Rowan, publishing three books with her as illustrator.

== Early life ==
Lounsberry was the daughter of James Smith Lounsberry and Sarah Woodruff (Burrows) Lounsberry. She was educated at Mrs. Sylvanus Reed's School in New York City (Leonard, 1914). Lounsberry's love for flowers and plants began as a young girl, likely from exploring the gardens around New York City where she lived. By the time she was in her twenties, she was on the board for the New York Botanical Garden.

== Career ==
Lounsberry is well known for her work alongside famed Australian botanical illustrator Ellis Rowan, known as “The Flower Hunter”, and the majority of her popular published works came from her time working with Rowan. The two first corresponded while Rowan was hospitalized after she contracted influenza during a trip to New York. This news was heard around the city and Lounsberry, a huge admirer of Rowan, brought a handpicked box of wildflowers to the hospital, alongside a card reading “From one flower seeker to another - and an admirer of your work”. Rowan was touched by the gesture, and the two became friends, despite their twenty year age difference.

In the next four years, the two traveled over the Southeastern United States in search of native plants. The first year, they traveled to Florida, exploring the St. Johns River, among other sites. They then visited the Southern Appalachian region, including Roan Mountain, Tennessee and Grandfather Mountain, North Carolina. The next year they returned to that region, working at the herbarium of the Biltmore Estate in Asheville, North Carolina. Presumably this is where Lounsberry became acquainted with Chauncey Beadle. The two women made a great team: “Lounsberry provided detailed botanical structure along with engaging observations of her subjects and their natural history, while Rowan’s artwork found a new audience. Together, their books were very popular". According to Samuel (1961), it was while in Asheville that Rowan received news that her son Eric (called "Puck") had been killed in South Africa. This would have taken place in the period 1899–1900, presumably during the Second Boer War (1899-1902).

Regarding her travels with Rowan in the American South, Lounsberry wrote: "To learn something of the history, the folklore and the uses of southern plants and to see rare ones growing in their natural surroundings, Mrs. Rowan and I traveled in many parts of the south, exercising always our best blandishments to get the people of the section to talk with us. Through the mountainous region we drove from cabin to cabin, and nowhere could we have met with greater kindness and hospitality."

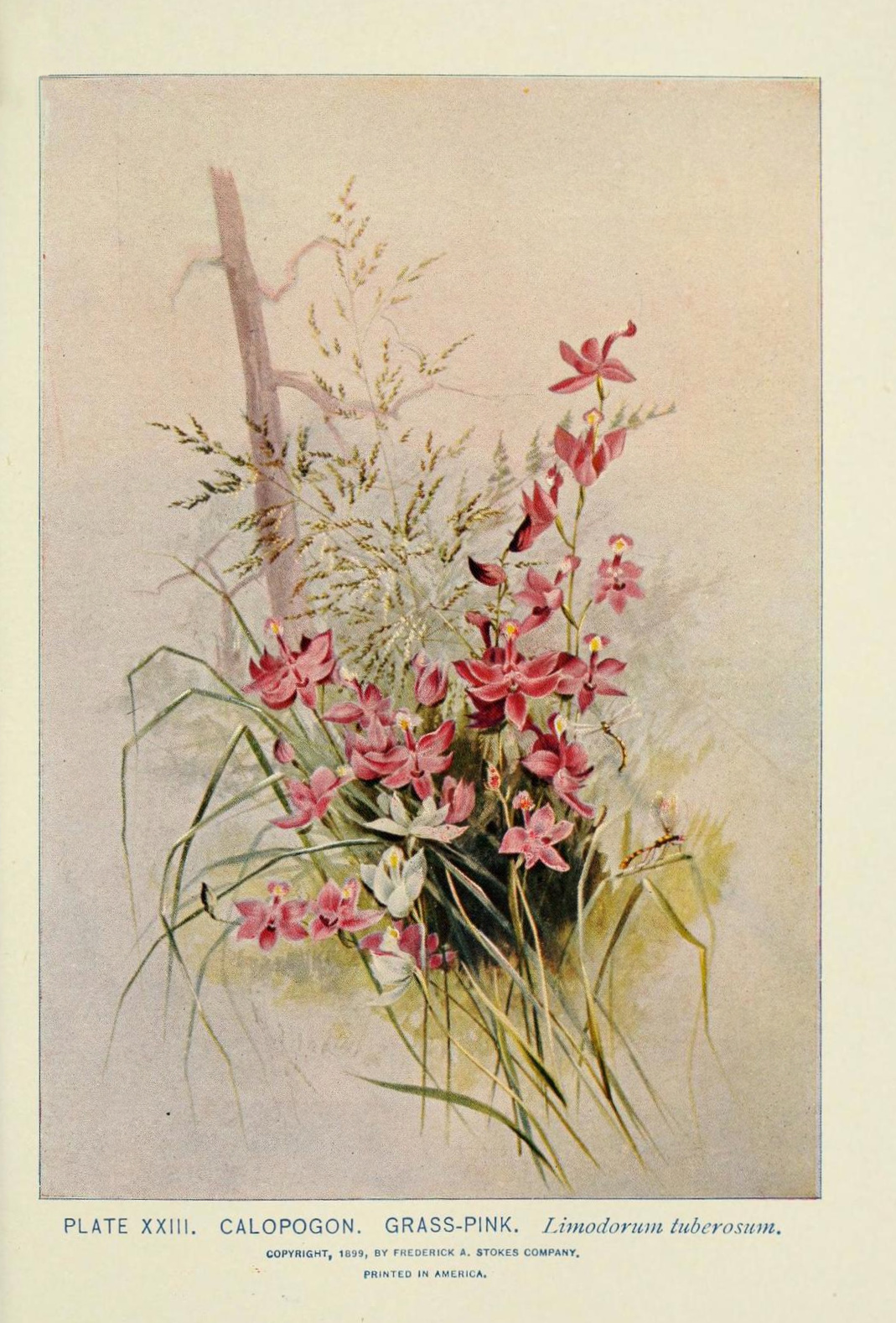
Calopogon Tuberosus, from A Guide to the Wild Flowers

Lounsberry and Rowan published three books together: A Guide to the Wild Flowers (1899), A Guide to the Trees (1900), and Southern Wild Flowers & Trees (1901). Their three works together were unique in the world of botanical writing: the books were formatted as a biological field guide, organized by the habitat in which the plant species lived. Lounsberry wrote several more works on botany and gardening, but none reached the popularity of her works with Rowan, based on their abundance on the used book market, circa 2006.

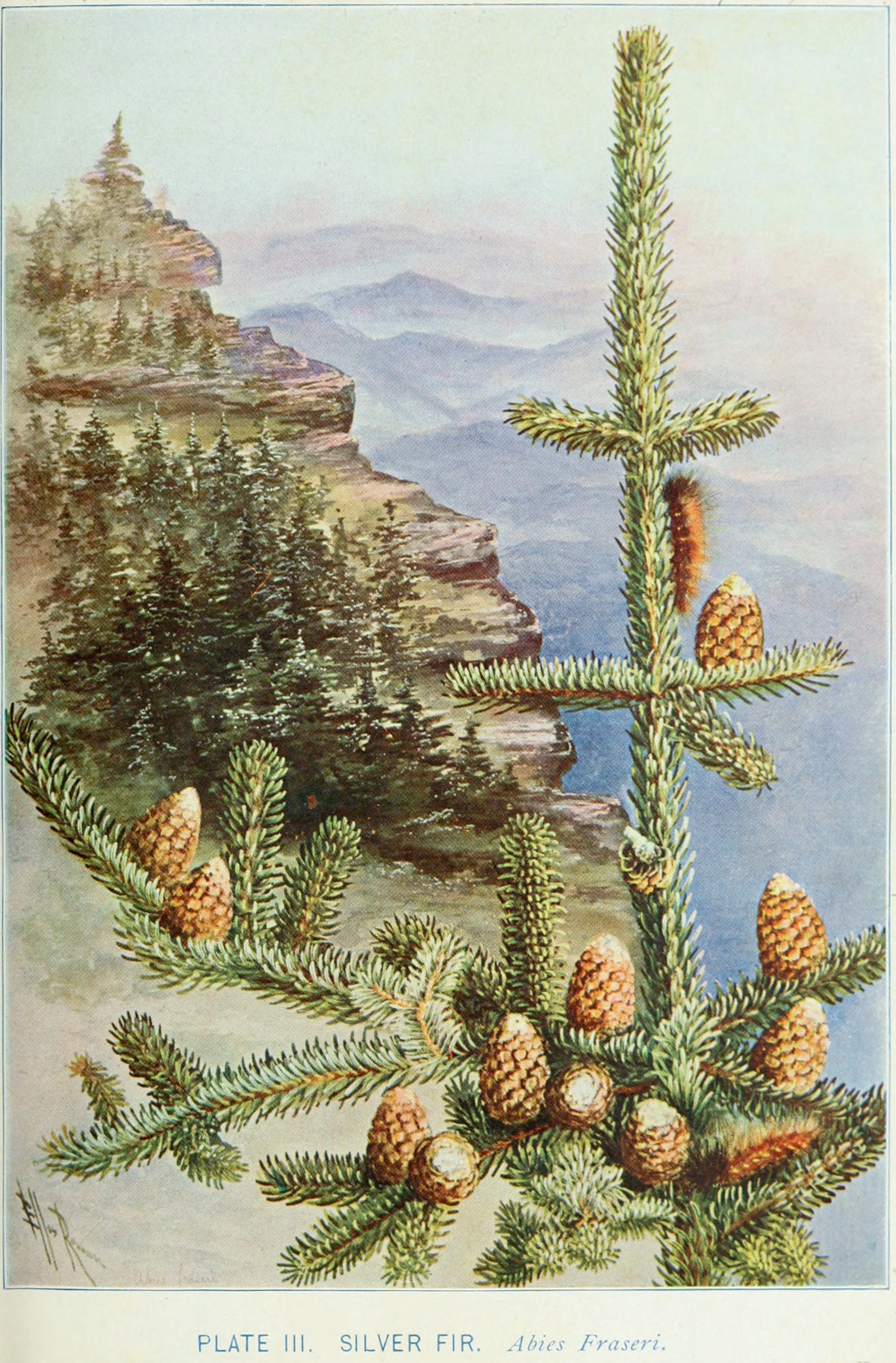
Frasier fir, from Southern Wildflowers and Trees

== Published works ==
Published works by Alice Lounsberry include:

- A Guide to the Wild Flowers (1899), Lounsberry is credited as the writer, while Rowan is credited for the illustrations. Over 150 wildflowers are pictured.
- A Guide to the Trees (1900), describing nearly 200 trees and shrubs
- Southern Wild Flowers & Trees (1901), in which Lounsberry and Rowan documented rare native species in the Southeast, and their journey along the way
- The Wild Flower Book For Young People (1906), a nonfiction book made to describe wildflowers to children through the use of pictures and accessible language.
- Garden Book for Young People (1908), a fiction book telling the story of two young children learning to garden. Illustrated with photographs.
- Gardens Near the Sea (1910), a large coffee table book depicting gardens grand and small on Long Island. Illustrated by H.W. Falkner.
- Sir William Phips (1941), a biography of Sir William Phips, a governor of Massachusetts. This work was much different from the rest, as Lounsberry began experimenting with other genres of writing towards the end of her life.

== Notes ==
- Samuel (1961) states that Lounsberry was about 25 years of age at her meeting with Rowan, and Rowan was in England in 1895 and into 1896, according to the National Library of Australia account. This indicates a date of approximately 1897 for their meeting.
- The National Library of Australia account, Flower Hunter, states the death of Rowan's son occurred shortly after Rowan arrived in America, but this may be a reference to the death of her father.
- Lounsberry is listed as the author of The Land of the Garden of Allah in this genealogical source, apparently quoting Sandusky Star Journal, Sandusky, Ohio, 8 Oct 1907. This is likely an error. The Stokes company published an edition of Garden of Allah by Robert Hichens in 1907, see The Book Art of Richard Minsky. This was perhaps taken for a work by Lounsberry in an advertisement by the publisher for several books.
