= Ellis Rowan =

Australian painter and botanist (1848–1922)

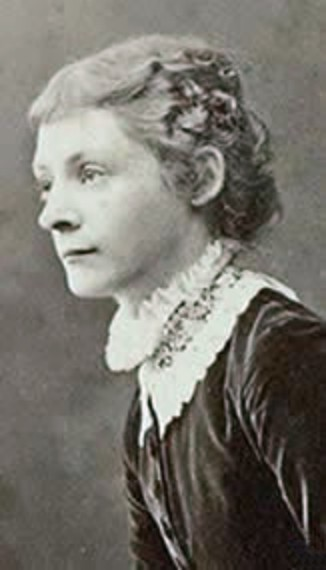
- Rowan in 1873
- Born: Marian Ellis Ryan; 30 July 1848; Melbourne, Colony of New South Wales
- Died: 4 October 1922 (aged 74); Macedon, Victoria, Australia
- Other name: Marian Ellis Rowan
- Known for: Natural history illustration
- Parents: Charles Ryan; Marian née Cotton

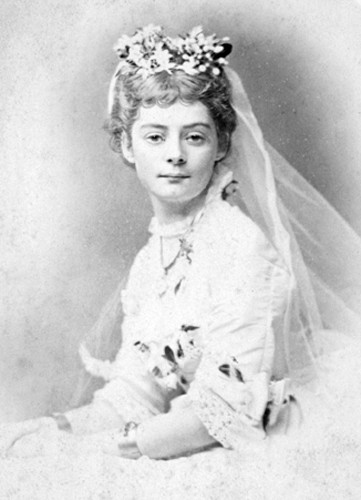
Ellis Rowan on her wedding day

Marian Ellis Rowan (30 July 1848 – 4 October 1922), known as Ellis Rowan, was a well-known Australian artist and botanical illustrator. She also did a series of illustrations on birds, butterflies and insects.

== Life ==
Marian, the daughter of Marian and Charles Ryan, principal of stock agents Ryan and Hammond, was born at "Killeen" near Longwood, Colony of New South Wales one of her father's pastoral stations in Victoria. Her family was well-connected: sister Ada Mary married Admiral Lord Charles Scott, son of the Duke of Buccleuch; brother Sir Charles Ryan was a noted Melbourne surgeon and for a time Turkish consul in London (and whose daughter became Baroness Casey). Another niece was Joice NanKivell Loch.

On 23 October 1873 Ellis Ryan married Frederic Charles Rowan (1844–1892), a British army officer. She returned with him to Taranaki in New Zealand, where Rowan was a sub-inspector in the armed constabulary. Their son Eric was born in 1875. Rowan and her husband returned to Melbourne in 1877.

Rowan painted in water-colour, and although she had no formal training, her works have been described as both botanically informative and artistic by contemporary observers. She undertook painting tours, at times in the company of her painting companion, Margaret Forrest. Rowan exhibited her work at the Palace of Fine Arts at the 1893 World's Columbian Exposition in Chicago, Illinois.

It was while in America, travelling with Alice Lounsberry, that Rowan received news that her son Eric had been killed in the Second Boer War. In 1916 she made a trip to New Guinea, the first of several during which she produced a huge volume of illustrations. She contracted malaria during these journeys. In 1920 she held the largest solo exhibition seen in Australia at the time, when she exhibited 1000 of her works in Sydney.

Ellis died at Macedon, Victoria, her husband and her only child having predeceased her. Her husband died of pneumonia in 1892, aged 47. Her son, (Frederick Charles Eric Elliott Rowan, known as 'Puck'), aged 22, died of nephritis in Africa in 1897, while in jail awaiting trial on charges of forgery.

Several accounts of her career have been published including:

- Australia's Brilliant Daughter Ellis Rowan: Artist, Naturalist, Explorer 1848–1922 (1984) by Margaret Hazzard. ISBN 0-909104-73-5
- Flower Paintings of Ellis Rowan from the Collection of the National Library of Australia (1982) by M. Hazzard and H. Hewson. ISBN 0-642-89730-1
- Ellis Rowan: A Flower-Hunter in Queensland (1990) by J. McKay. ISBN 0-7242-3847-6
- The Flower Hunter: Ellis Rowan (2002) by Patricia Fullerton. ISBN 0-642-10760-2
- Wild Flower Hunter—the story of Ellis Rowan (1961) by her niece, H. J. (Helen Jo) Samuel.

Books by Rowan published in Australia include Bill Baillie, his Life and Adventures, A flower-hunter in Queensland & New Zealand, The Queensland Flora, and Sketches in Black and White in New Zealand.

Rowan contributed botanical studies to Ferdinand von Mueller for his collection on Australian flora. The Menzies Hotel in Melbourne, built in 1867 and demolished in 1969, had a reading room decorated with ferns and flora painted by Rowan. The Australian Club in Melbourne, one of that city's oldest and most venerable establishments, has a room with wall panel murals by Rowan, painted as a result of a commission from the club. These are the only known surviving example of her murals.

Despite winning several gold medals judged by international artists against some of Australia's leading male artists, a disdain for her ability, artistry, and capacity due to her gender resulted in a bias against her art that lasted decades. Her art was housed in the National Library, not the National Gallery.

== National Library of Australia - Rowan Collection ==
In 1923, a year after her death, her surviving collection of 952 paintings was offered to the Australian government by her estate. The offer was debated in the House of Representatives. Parliament eventually agreed on a price of 5000 pounds for the paintings, half the asking price, and they became the property of the Australian Commonwealth. The collection was stored in the vaults of the Federal Treasury in Melbourne until 1933, when custody was transferred to the Commonwealth National Library. Some items were lent to Australian government agencies and offices abroad; most were returned to the library but some were lost. The remaining 919 paintings are now housed at the National Library of Australia. Rowan's Memorial portrait is also there.

== Queensland Museum Collection ==
The Queensland Museum's collection of 125 botanical paintings by Ellis Rowan has been in accessible to the public for almost half a century. By 1912, her collection was taken from the old Brisbane Town Hall to the Queensland Museum after Rowan's victorious Exhibition.

1. Painting techniques

Ellis Rowan painted most of her Queensland paintings indoor, she always worked into the night to drawn plants that she collected on her journey. On the other hand, Ellis was a rapid and direct painter who made her botanical paintings outdoor, which usually without the under-drawing of the pencil. She painted and traveled with her curiosity and personal interests, and she did not intend to be a serious botanical illustrator. She wrote of her Queensland Paintings:

'The collection is painted with a view of showing the general public how the flowers grow with their surroundings—while they are all botanically correct you cannot in the one drawing make a picture of the flower and also show it scientifically drawn in sections which is quite a different study.'

Ellis desired to make artistic compositions, which generally represented with bold close-up form. The colorful and vivid flora painted by her were not in the conventional way but placed in the varies native habitats, extending beyond the picture frame. Her composition was influenced by the Thornton's Temple of Flora. Ellis sometimes added insects and even snakes to her artworks, like some of Thornton's art, in order to achieve the dramatic effect.

Claiming herself a self-taught painter, Ellis combined traditional watercolor techniques with opaque paints that she used to illustrate detail. She produced multiple copies of her paintings, and this non-professional and peculiar practice resulted in the difficulty of classifying the quantity of her output.

2. Plants

For today's botanists, Ellis Rowan's painting has limited scientific research value because they are lacking the critical details that is necessary for the botanical illustrations. However, these flora drawings are accurate and clear enough to help people identify most of the plants she drew. Although Ellis confessed that she knew very little about plants, she maintained her passion and love to discovering the botanical world, dried many specimens as her collections.

In the early year of her career, there was the trend that depicting the flower or fruit as an isolated part or branch, but her later career showed a change which was inclined to put plants in their own environment rather than in a studio-like space. Ellis created her botanical world more than paint every detail of her observation. There are some ‘new species’ plants created by Ellis, which often added one part of a plant to another, the most surprisingly, the arrangement of these different types plants presented a pleasing combination.

There is another reason why Ellis’ paintings are not strong enough to be called the scientific illustration. It seems that Ellis had her own taste when she choosing the object, which resulted in the limitation of botanical species in her painting. She preferred colorful and showy species rather than many small-flowered herbaceous species. For example, waterlilies were her favourite flowers, and there was no depicting of the large and significant sunflower family in her artworks.

3. Animals

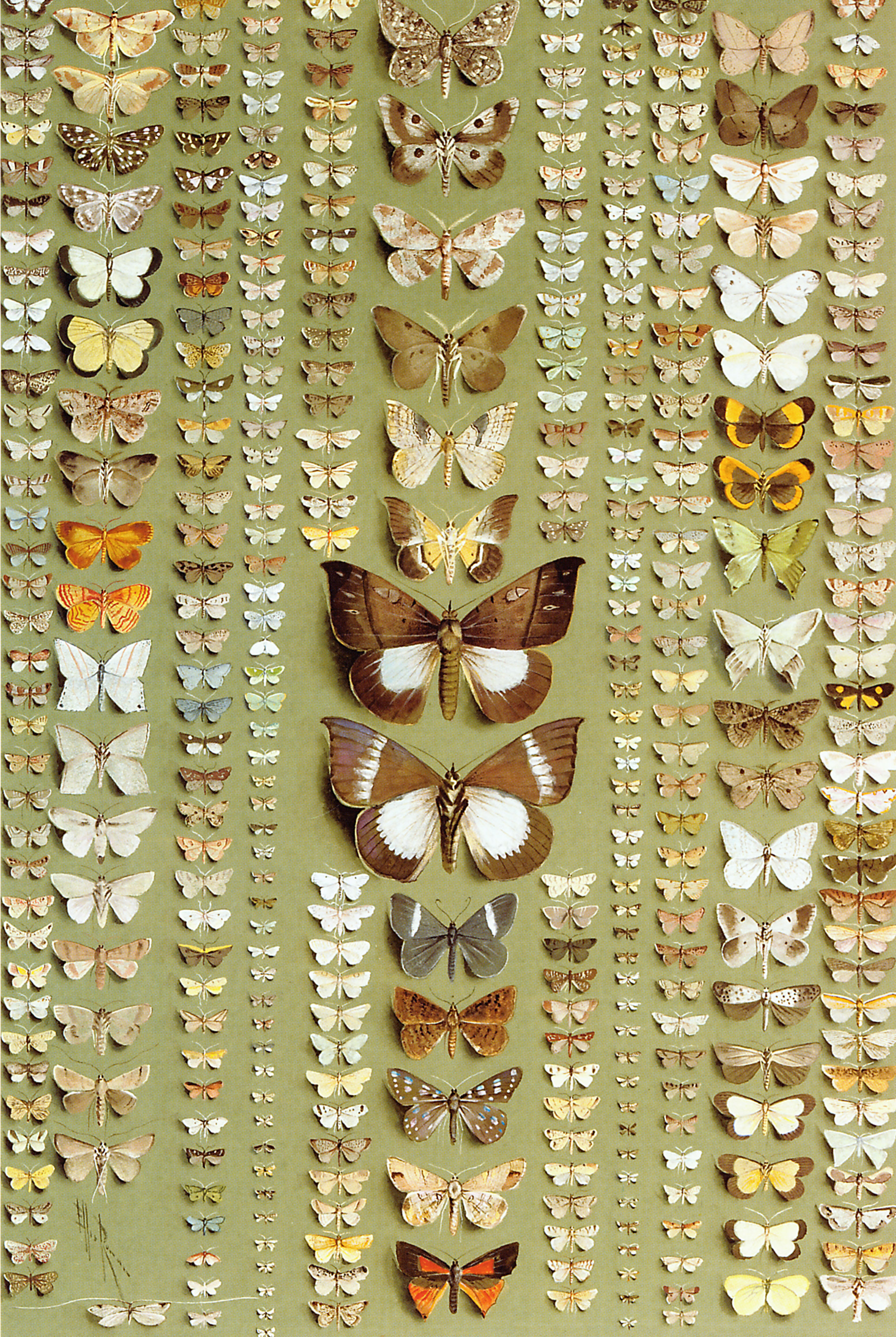
374 moths of New Guinea, in 11 columns, belonging to a wide variety of families, water colour with bodycolour on grey-green paper, 56.2 x 38.1 cm 1918

In addition to her spectacular botanical paintings, Ellis Rowan also created detailed depictions of animals and insects, particularly in her New Guinea bird and butterfly series. The series about New Guinea bird and butterfly drawings are her major exploration into animal paintings. One-third of Ellis’ paintings which collected in the Queensland Museum were illustrated plenty of species of animal, such as beetles, butterflies, snakes and dragonflies. These insects or animals in Ellis’ works probably added later after the plants, because most of Ellis paintings finished indoor and the flower was often picked by herself or given to her by the local people. it has been questioned that whether the representation of these real species was accurate in their context. It is probably that Ellis combined plants and insects at random, without thinking carefully about the relationship between them. Ellis’ interest with animals was derived from her early experience with her family, as recollected by her niece Lady Casey:

‘She had inherited the interest of her grandfather John Cotton not only in flora and fauna but in insects and even reptiles; she enjoyed the accident of life, the fusion of one aspect of nature with another. … Some of our family, the Le Souefs, actually had a feeling for shakes. They liked running their warm fingers over those long cold exquisite bodies.’

Rowan's enthusiasm for artistic creation is reflected in her correspondence, which frequently mentions her interest in observing and collecting insects. These magical creatures brought her entertainment and helped her escape from her busy business of botanical painting. In spite of observing insects, Ellis also a collector of them. Her letters which wrote during her journey always mentioned collecting activities, and some of them were the adventurous stories of snakes. There were sheets of paper painted with rows and rows butterflies leaning on Ellis’ studio wall. They indicate the study that Ellis down as a source of adding to the flower paintings. However, the adding of these animals and insects were more for the artistic effect rather than the realistic illustration. While Rowan's botanical paintings may lack certain scientific details, they provide a valuable historical visual record of Queensland's flora.

== Royal Worcester ==
Rowan was commissioned to do a series of paintings to be used as designs on Royal Worcester tea sets. A collection of this porcelain is held at the National Trust of Australia property Saumarez Homestead. A collection of the original drawings is held at the Museum of Royal Worcester.

== Selected list of medals awarded Ellis Rowan ==
- International Exhibition Melbourne, 1873
- Sydney International Exhibition, 1879
- Special Merit, Ellis Rowan, Macedon. Flower Painting, International Exhibition, Sydney, 1879
- International Colonial and Export Exhibition, Amsterdam, 1883
- Calcutta International Exhibition, 1833–1884
- Colonial and Indian Exhibition, London, 1886
- Melbourne International Exhibition (1880), ‘Vitam Excolvere per Artem’
- London International Exhibition, Crystal Palace, 1884
- Centennial International Exhibition, Melbourne, 1888
- World Columbian Exposition in Commemoration of the Four Hundredth Anniversary of the Landing of Columbus, 1892–1893

Source: Australian Dictionary of Biography

Selected work

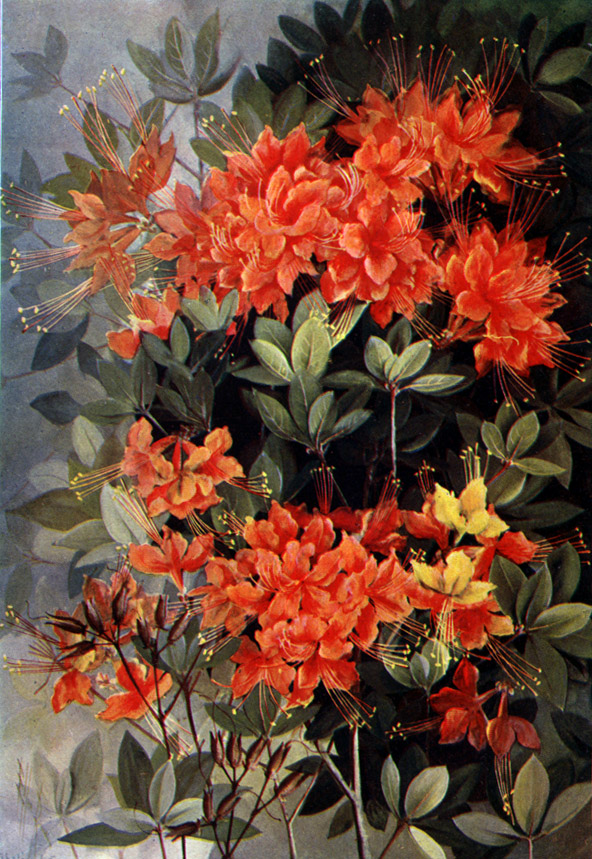
Flame azalea by Ellis Rowan, from Southern Wildflowers and Trees by Alice Lounsberry

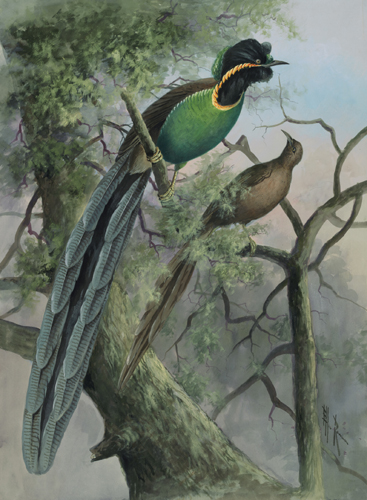
Rothschild's Bird of Paradise Astrapia rothschildi, Papua New Guinea c. 1917.

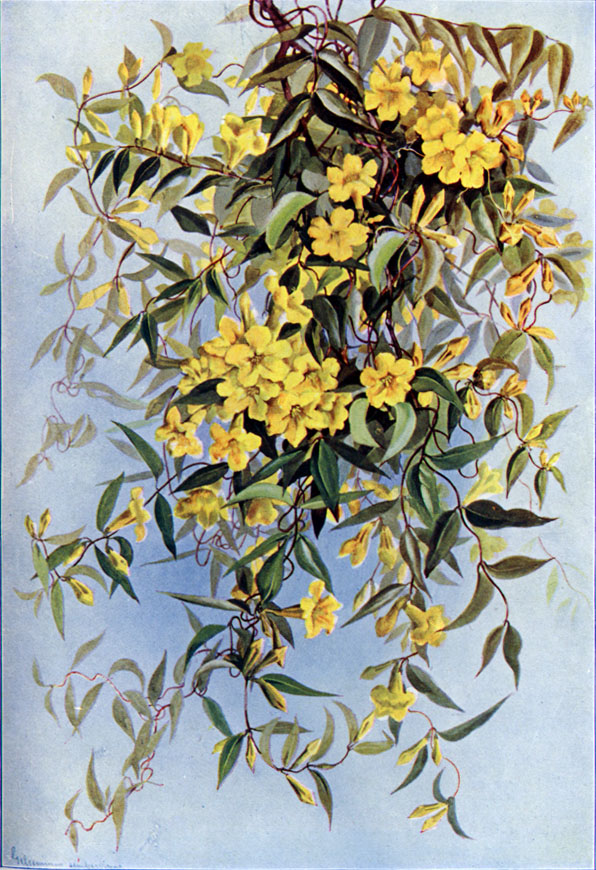
Carolina Jessamine

== Bibliography ==
- A Flower Hunter in Queensland and New Zealand (London, John Murray, 1898)
- [With Alice Lounsberry] A guide to the wild flowers (New York, F.A. Stokes, 1899)
- [With Alice Lounsberry] A guide to the trees (New York, F.A. Stokes, 1899)
- [With Alice Lounsberry] Southern wild flowers and trees (New York, F.A. Stokes, 1901)
- Bill Baillie, his life and adventures (Melbourne, Whitcombe and Tombs, 1908)
- [With Herbert P. Dickins] Australian wild-flowers : a popular introduction to the wild-flowers of Australia, with notes on their characteristics and the localities where they may be found. (Melbourne, Robertson and Mullens, 1944)

Source: Worldcat.org

== Memorials ==
=== Portrait ===
Her portrait by Sir John Longstaff, paid for by public subscription, was unveiled in 1929. It was the first national portrait of an Australian woman.

=== Rowan Street ===
A street in the Canberra suburb of Cook is named in her honour.

=== Ellis Rowan Building ===
The first building in the Australian National Botanic Gardens was named in her honour.

== See also ==
- List of Australian botanical illustrators

== Sources ==
- Hazzard, Margaret (1984). Australia's Brilliant Daughter, Ellis Rowan. Australia: Greenhouse Publications. p. 152. ISBN 0909104735.
- Morton-Evans, Christine & Michael (2009). The flower hunter: the remarkable life of Ellis Rowan. Canberra: National Library of Australia. ISBN 9780642277015.
- The National Library of Australia. The Flower Hunter: Ellis Rowan
- Marian Ellis Rowan at The Australian Women's Register
- Australian National Botanic Gardens Biography
- Bright Sparcs Biographical Entry
