= Margaret Hazzard =

Australian writer

Margaret Hazzard (Ivy Margaret Hazzard) 1910 – 19 January 1987 was an Australian author born in Hertfordshire, England.

Hazzard immigrated to Melbourne, Australia in 1960 and established a career as a freelance writer, publishing in The Sydney Morning Herald and the Australian Women's Weekly. She also worked as a teacher, taking short courses in writing fiction and biography at the Centre of Adult Education (CAE) in Melbourne.

In 1970 Hazzard founded the Victorian Branch of the Society of Women Writers and was elected chair from 1970 to 1974. The Society established the biennial Margaret Hazzard Award in 1980 in recognition of her contribution.

Hazzard moved to Norfolk Island in 1974 where she began her "most prolific writing period".

Hazzard died in 1987 and is buried at Mount Macedon, Victoria.

== Bibliography ==
- Convicts and Commandants of Norfolk Island 1788-1855 (1978) (OCLC 34337228)
- The life & work of Ellis Rowan (c.1983) (ISBN 0642992401)
- Australia’s brilliant daughter, Ellis Rowan : artist, naturalist, explorer, 1848-1922 (1984) (ISBN 0909104735)
- Punishment Short of Death: A History of the Penal Settlement at Norfolk Island(1984) (ISBN 0908090641)
