= Biltmore Forest, North Carolina =

- Town
- Logo

- Location in Buncombe County and the state of North Carolina
- Coordinates: 35°32′05″N 82°32′25″W
- Country: United States
- State: North Carolina
- County: Buncombe

Area
  - Total: 2.91 sq mi (7.54 km^{2})
  - Land: 2.91 sq mi (7.54 km^{2})
  - Water: 0 sq mi (0.00 km^{2})
- Elevation: 2,211 ft (674 m)

Population (2020)
  - Total: 1,409
  - Density: 484.2/sq mi (186.94/km^{2})
- Time zone: UTC-5 (Eastern (EST))
  - Summer (DST): UTC-4 (EDT)
- ZIP code: 28803
- Area code: 828
- FIPS code: 37-05880
- GNIS feature ID: 2405266
- Website: Official website

Biltmore Forest is a town in Buncombe County, North Carolina, United States. The population was 1,409 as of 2020. It is part of the Asheville Metropolitan Statistical Area. Biltmore Forest is the second-wealthiest town in North Carolina by per capita income at $85,044.

== History ==
In 1916, a substantial flood in Asheville, North Carolina, damaged the Biltmore Estate. The Biltmore Company sold the affected land to lessen the upkeep and tax burden. The town of Biltmore Forest was chartered in 1923 and was developed on this land. The first houses were built on White Oak Road. In 1929, Asheville annexed a portion of Biltmore Forest, but that action was reversed in 1935 by an act of the North Carolina legislature.

The Judge Junius G. Adams House, Raoulwood (Thomas Wadley Raoul House) and Gunston Hall are listed on the National Register of Historic Places.

== Geography ==
According to the United States Census Bureau, the town has a total area of 2.9 square miles (7.5 km^{2}), all land.

== Demographics ==
Historical population
Census	Pop.	Note	%±
1900	71		—
1910	173		143.7%
1930	313		—
1940	476		52.1%
1950	657		38.0%
1960	1,004		52.8%
1970	1,298		29.3%
1980	1,499		15.5%
1990	1,327		−11.5%
2000	1,440		8.5%
2010	1,343		−6.7%
2020	1,409		4.9%
U.S. Decennial Census

=== 2020 census ===
Biltmore Forest racial composition
Race	Number	Percentage
White (non-Hispanic)	1,315	93.33%
Black or African American (non-Hispanic)	6	0.43%
Asian	15	1.06%
Other/Mixed	35	2.48%
Hispanic or Latino	38	2.7%

As of the 2020 United States census, there were 1,409 people, 605 households, and 485 families residing in the town.

=== 2000 census ===
As of the census of 2000, there were 1,409 people, 588 households, and 456 families residing in the town. The population density was 494.5 inhabitants per square mile (190.9/km^{2}). There were 653 housing units at an average density of 224.2 per square mile (86.6/km^{2}). The racial makeup of the town was 99.24% White, 0.35% Native American, 0.14% Asian, 0.07% from other races, and 0.21% from two or more races. Hispanic or Latino of any race were 0.14% of the population.

There were 588 households, out of which 29.3% had children under the age of 18 living with them, 72.8% were married couples living together, 3.4% had a female householder with no husband present, and 22.4% were non-families. 20.7% of all households were made up of individuals, and 12.1% had someone living alone who was 65 years of age or older. The average household size was 2.45 and the average family size was 2.83.

In the town, the population was spread out, with 23.2% under the age of 18, 3.1% from 18 to 24, 16.5% from 25 to 44, 36.1% from 45 to 64, and 21.2% who were 65 years of age or older. The median age was 49 years. For every 100 females, there were 94.1 males. For every 100 females age 18 and over, there were 88.7 males.

The median income for a household in the town was $119,526, and the median income for a family was $152,654. Males had a median income of $100,000 versus $38,750 for females. The per capita income for the town was $85,044. About 0.4% of families and 0.8% of the population were below the poverty line, including 0.6% of those under age 18 and none of those age 65 or over. Biltmore Forest has the highest per capita income of any city or town with over 1,000 inhabitants in North Carolina.

== See also ==
- Biltmore Forest School
