= Rubus boyntonii =

Scientific classification
- Kingdom: Plantae
- Clade: Tracheophytes
- Clade: Angiosperms
- Clade: Eudicots
- Clade: Rosids
- Order: Rosales
- Family: Rosaceae
- Genus: Rubus
- Species: R. boyntonii

Binomial name
- Rubus boyntonii Ashe 1903

Synonyms
- Rubus boyntoni Ashe

Berry and plant

Rubus boyntonii, also called Boynton's dewberry, is a rare North American species of flowering plant in the rose family. It has been found only in the States of Virginia and North Carolina in the east-central United States.

The genetics of Rubus is extremely complex, so that it is difficult to decide on which groups should be recognized as species. There are many rare species with limited ranges such as this. Further study is suggested to clarify the taxonomy. Some studies have suggested that R. boyntonii may have originated as a hybrid between R. allegheniensis and R. flagellaris.
