= Falls Lake State Recreation Area =

State park in North Carolina, United States

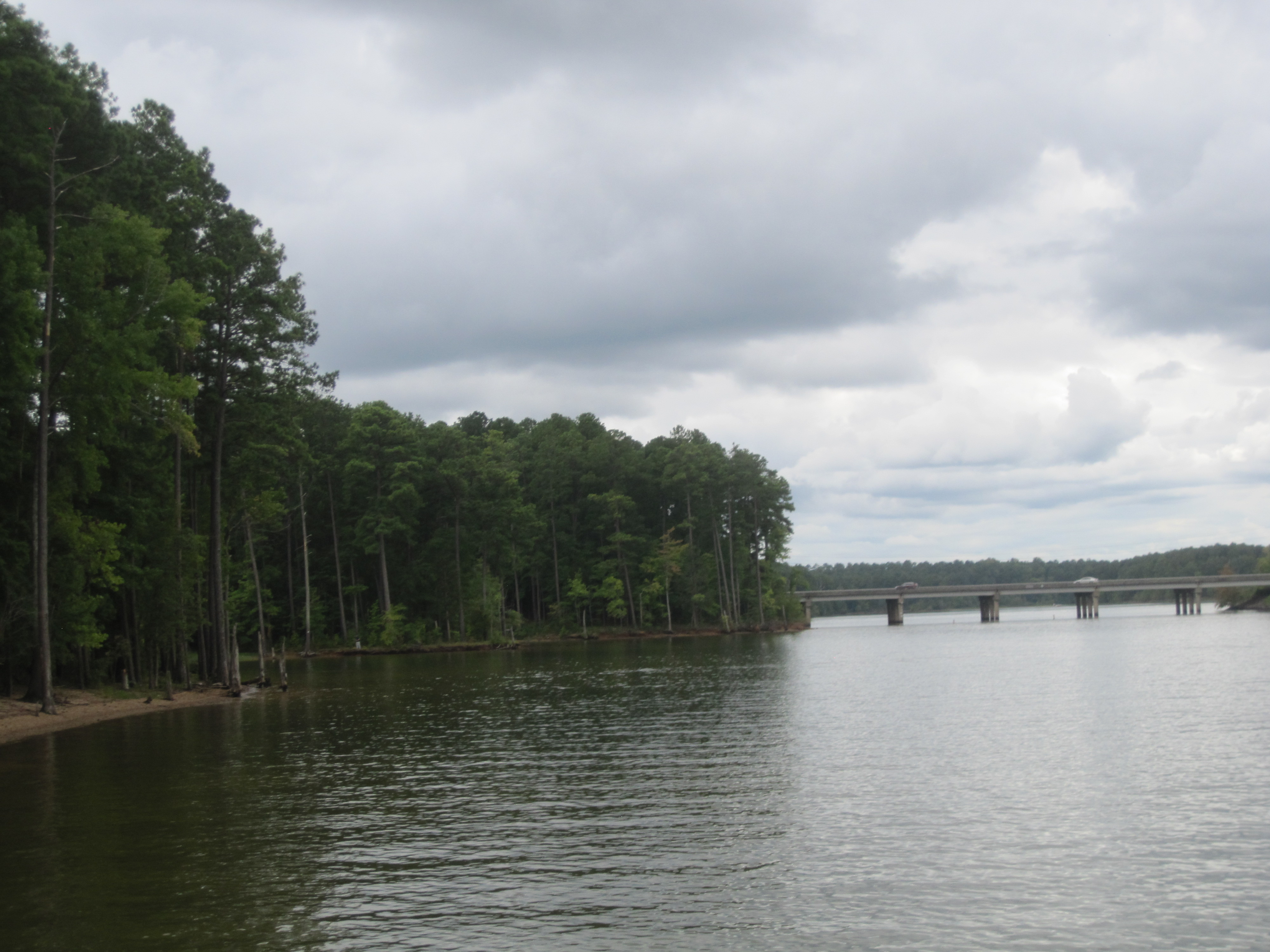
- Interactive map of Falls Lake State Recreation Area
- Location: Durham and Wake counties, North Carolina, United States
- Coordinates: 36°00′42″N 78°41′20″W
- Area: 5,035 acres (2,038 ha)
- Established: 1982
- Administrator: North Carolina Division of Parks and Recreation
- Website: Official website

Falls Lake State Recreation Area is a North Carolina state park in Durham and Wake counties, North Carolina in the United States. Near Wake Forest, North Carolina, it covers 5,035 acres (2,038 ha) along the shores of 12,410-acre (5,020 ha) Falls Lake.

== History ==
Prior to 1978, flooding of the Neuse River caused extensive damage to public and private properties including roadways, railroads, industrial sites and farmlands. The Falls Lake Project was developed by the US Army Corps of Engineers to control damaging floods. Construction of the dam began in 1978 and was completed in 1981. In addition to recreation opportunities, Falls Lake now provides flood and water-quality control, water supply, and fish and wildlife conservation.

In 1992, the NC Division of Parks and Recreation took control of the James Mangum House as part of Beaverdam Recreation Area.

Rock Cliff Farm is owned by the federal government, and part of a large acreage managed by the state of North Carolina as the Falls Lake State Recreation Area. It was listed on the National Register of Historic Places in 2007.

== Hiking ==
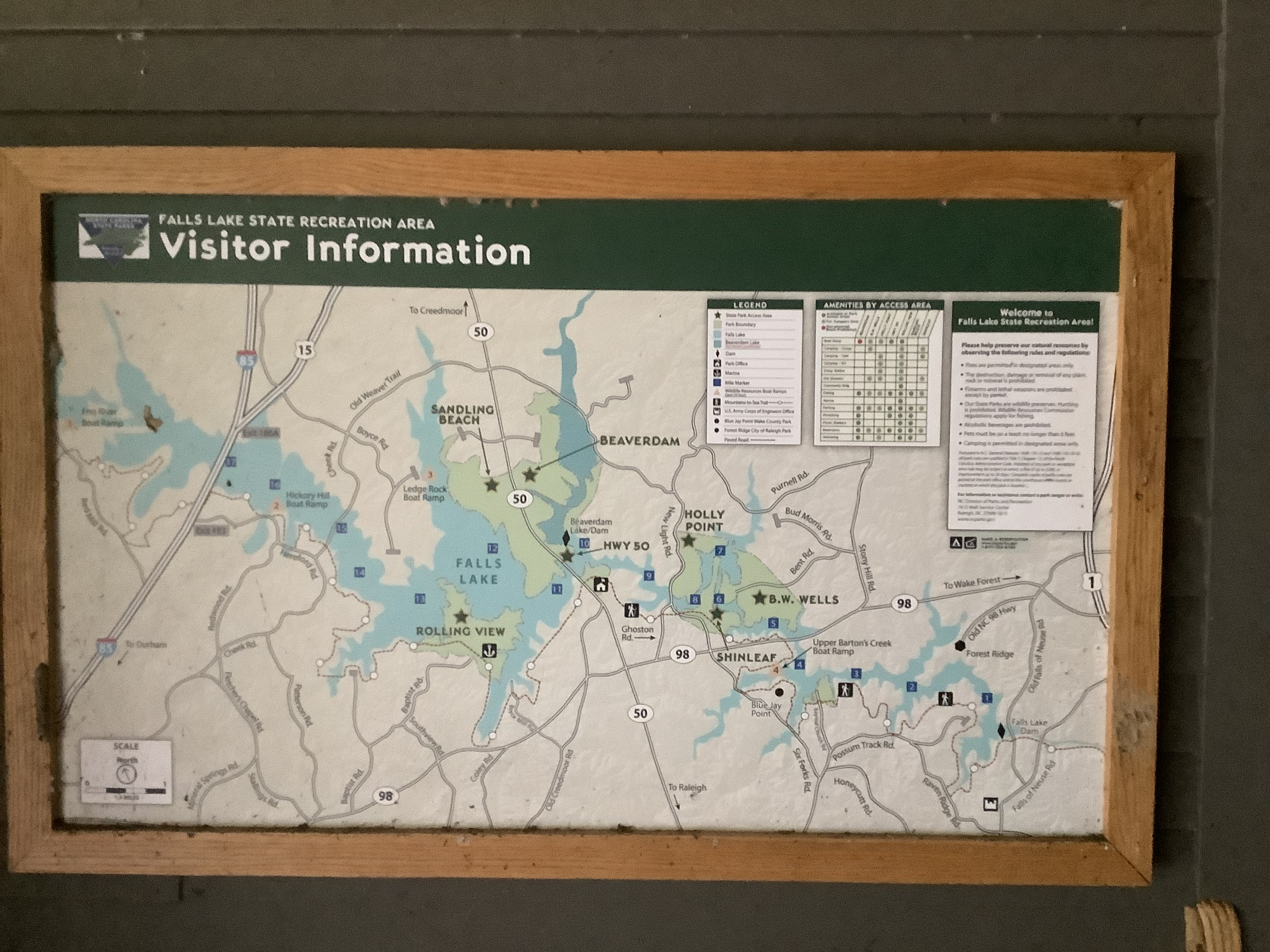
Map of Falls Lake State Recreation Area

Falls Lake hiking trails on the south side are part of the Mountains-to-Sea Trail which stretches from Kuwohi in the Great Smoky Mountains to Jockey's Ridge State Park on the Outer Banks of North Carolina.

Camping along the Falls Lake portion of the trail is only available at Shinleaf Recreation Area in Wake County and Rolling View Recreation Area in Durham County. Trails are easy to moderate on some steep ridges.

== Mountain biking ==
The Beaver Dam bike trails at Falls Lake are easy to intermediate and have trails for everyone. Trail heads are accessible from the park entrance at Beaverdam Recreation Area only.

== Kayak and canoeing ==
Falls Lake is accessible by kayaks and canoes from two boat launches at Highway 50 and Beaver Dam Lake.

== In literature ==
Falls Lake is one of the settings in the spy thriller novel Crisis Four by Andy McNab.

== See also ==
- Falls Lake
