= Chauncey Beadle =

Canadian-born botanist and horticulturist

Chauncey Delos Beadle
- Born: August 5, 1866; St. Catharines, Canada West
- Died: 1950; Asheville, North Carolina
- Education: Cornell University
- Scientific career
- Fields: Botany; Horticulture
- Workplaces: Biltmore Estate
- Author abbrev. (botany): Beadle

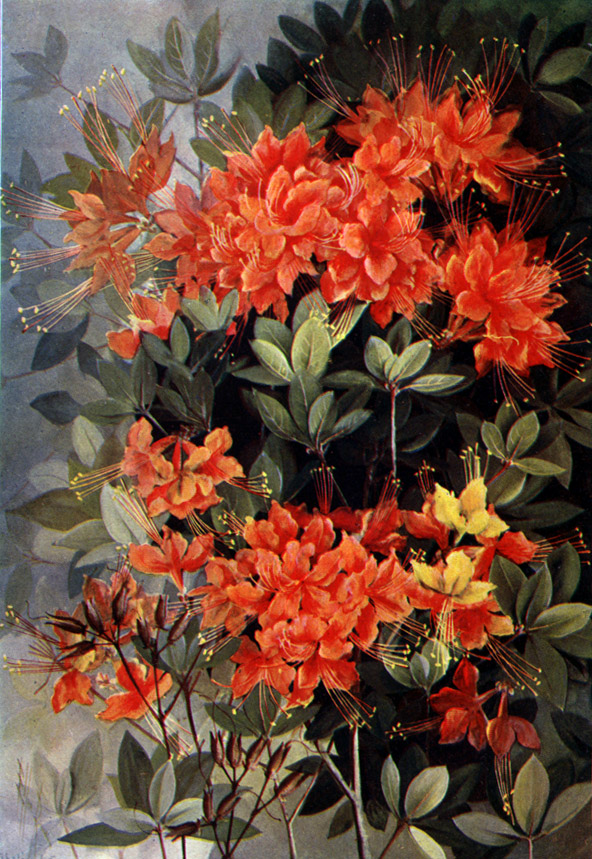
Beadle was known for his horticultural work with azaleas. This Flame Azalea, by Ellis Rowan, is from Southern Wildflowers and Trees by Alice Lounsberry. Beadle wrote the Introduction for that work.

Chauncey Delos Beadle (August 5, 1866 – 1950) was a Canadian-born botanist and horticulturist active in the southern United States. He was educated in horticulture at Ontario Agricultural College (1884) and Cornell University (1889). In 1890 the landscape architect Frederick Law Olmsted hired him to oversee the nursery at Biltmore Estate in Asheville, North Carolina on a temporary basis. Olmsted had been impressed by Beadle's "encyclopedic" knowledge of plants. Beadle ended up working at Biltmore for more than 60 years, until his death in 1950. He is best known for his horticultural work with azaleas, and described several species and varieties of plants from the southern Appalachian region. He and three friends, including his "driver and companion" Sylvester Owens, styled themselves the Azalea Hunters. The group traveled over the eastern United States for a period of fifteen years, studying and collecting native plants. In 1940 Beadle donated his entire collection of 3,000 plants to Biltmore Estates.

He also designed the landscape at Gunston Hall, Biltmore Forest, North Carolina and Intheoaks at Black Mountain, North Carolina.

Beadle wrote scientific papers describing new species and varieties of North American plants, for example, papers in the journal Biltmore Botanical Studies and his major work on the genus Crataegus (hawthorns) in John Kunkel Small's 1903 book Flora of the Southeastern United States. (See, for example, to the scientific description of Florida Mock-orange, Philadelphus floridus.) Two of his important collaborators at Biltmore were Charles Lawrence Boynton and Frank Ellis Boynton. In popular literature, Beadle wrote the Introduction for Alice Lounsberry's Southern Wildflowers and Trees.
