= Frank Ellis Boynton =

American botanist (1859 – December 10, 1942)

- Born: July 10, 1859; Hyde Park, Vermont
- Died: December 10, 1942 (aged 83); Old Fort, North Carolina
- Scientific career
- Fields: Botany
- Workplaces: Biltmore Estate
- Author abbrev. (botany): F.E.Boynton

Frank Ellis Boynton (July 10, 1859 – December 10, 1942) was a self-taught American botanist active in the Southeastern United States. He worked at Biltmore Estate with his brother, Charles Lawrence Boynton, and Chauncey Beadle. Boynton's dewberry, Rubus boyntonii was named in honor of Frank Ellis Boynton.

== Sources ==
- "IPNI listing".
- "Etymology of Rare Plants (Nature Conservancy)" (PDF). Archived from the original (PDF) on 2006-12-15.
