= Becker =

Becker (German pronunciation: [ˈbɛkɐ, -kər]) is one of the German-language surnames, along with Bäcker and Baecker, that derive from the [baːk]~[bɛk] root, which refers to baking. The surname began as a name for a baker (and thus his family). In northern Germany, it can also derive from the word Beck for Bach ("creek" or "brook") to denote origin.

== Geographical distribution ==
As of 2014, 55.3% of all known bearers of the surname Becker were residents of Germany (frequency 1:287), 24.7% of the United States (1:2,891), 8.0% of Brazil (1:5,052), 2.7% of France (1:4,987), 2.0% of South Africa (1:5,431) and 1.2% of Canada (1:6,120).

In Germany, the frequency of the surname was higher than the national average (1:287) in the following states:

1. Saarland (1:84)
2. Rhineland-Palatinate (1:123)
3. Hesse (1:159)
4. North Rhine-Westphalia (1:226)
5. Saxony-Anhalt (1:248)

== People ==
=== A ===
- Aaron Becker (born 1974), American writer and illustrator
- Abigail Becker (1830s–1905), Canadian farmer and trapper
- Adam Becker (born 1984), American astrophysicist and author
- Adolf von Becker (1831–1909), Finnish artist
- Aharon Becker (1905–1995), Israeli politician
- Alan S. Becker (1946–2020), American politician and lawyer
- Albert Becker (chess player) (1896–1984), Austrian-Argentine chess master
- Albert Becker (composer) (1834–1899), German composer and conductor
- Albert L. Becker (1911–1992), United States Navy officer
- Albrecht Becker (1906–2002), German designer, actor and photographer
- Alexander K. Becker (1818–1901), German botanist and entomologist
- Alexandra Becker (born 1995), German politician
- Alfred Becker (1899–1981), German engineer and military officer
- Alfred G. Becker (1887–1956), American politician from Wisconsin
- Alice Becker-Ho (born 1941), French poet
- Alison Becker, American actress and television writer
- Alisson Becker (born 1992), Brazilian footballer
- Alton L. Becker (1932-2011), American linguist
- André Becker (born 1996), Brazilian footballer
- Andreas Becker (born 1970), German field hockey player
- Andy Becker, Australian public servant
- Anke Becker (born 1967), German microbiologist
- Anna Becker (born 1977), Swedish golfer
- Annette Becker (born 1953), French historian, daughter of Jean-Jacques Becker
- Anni Becker (1926–2009), German musician
- Annika Becker (born 1981), German pole vaulter
- Antoinette Becker (1920–1998), French-German author
- Arlene Becker, American politician
- Armando Becker (born 1966), Venezuelan basketball player
- Arnulf Becker Lorca, Chilean historian of international law
- Art Becker (1942–2026), American basketball player and coach
- Arthur P. Becker (born 1949/1950), American investor and real estate developer
- Artur Becker (1905–1938), German politician
- August Becker (1900–1967), German SS officer and war criminal
- August Becker (author) (1828–1891), German writer
- August Becker (painter) (1821–1887), German painter
- August Becker (socialist) (c.1810–1875), German-American political writer

=== B ===
- Barbara Becker (born 1966), German-American designer and model
- B. Jay Becker (1904–1987), American lawyer and bridge player
- Beals Becker (1886–1943), American baseball player
- Ben Becker (born 1964), German actor
- Benjamin Becker (born 1981), German tennis player
- Bente Becker (born 1985), Dutch politician
- Benton Becker (1938–2015), American lawyer
- Bernard Becker (1920–2013, American ophthalmologist
- Bertha Becker (1930–2013), Brazilian geographer
- Betsy Becker, American statistician and researcher
- Bill Becker (1916–2010), American journalist
- Bo Becker (born 1971), Swedish economist and academic
- Bob Becker (baseball) (1875–1951), American baseball player
- Bob Becker (composer) (born 1947), American percussionist and composer
- Bob Becker (music executive) (born c.1963), American music executive and musician
- Bobby Becker (1918–1954), American professional wrestler
- Bonifatius Becker (1898–1981), German abbot
- Boris Becker (born 1967), German tennis player, coach, and commentator
- Boris Becker (internet personality) (born 1993), Belgian dancer and internet personality
- Bowe Becker (born 1997), American swimmer and coach
- Bradley Becker, U.S. Army general
- Brian Becker, American politician from Connecticut
- Bridget Becker (born 1980), New Zealand curler
- Britta Becker (born 1973), German field hockey player
- Brooke Becker (born 2002), American ice hockey player
- Bruce Becker (born 1959), American drummer
- Bruno Becker (born 1990), Brazilian swimmer
- Burton Becker, American police officer

=== C ===
- Cacilda Becker (1921–1969), Brazilian actress
- Calice Becker (born c.1964), French perfumer
- Carol Becker, American writer and academic administrator
- Carl Becker (general) (1895–1966), German general
- Carl Becker (marine painter) (1862–1926), German marine artist
- Carl Ferdinand Becker (1804–1877), German musician
- Carl Fredrick Becker (1919–2013), American luthier and restorer
- Carl Heinrich Becker (1876–1933), German orientalist and politician
- Carl K. Becker (1894–1990), American doctor and missionary
- Carl L. Becker (1873–1945), American historian
- Caroline Becker (1826–1881), Finnish photographer
- Carolyn Becker (born 1958), American volleyball player
- Catherina Becker (born 1964), German researcher
- Carsten Becker (born 1990), German politician
- Charles Becker (1870–1915), American police officer and convicted murderer
- Charles Becker (politician) (1840–1908), German-American politician
- Charles J. Becker (1924–2007), American politician
- Charlie Becker
- Charlie Becker (American football), American football player
- Charlie Becker (baseball) (1890–1928), American baseball player
- Charlotte Becker (born 1983), German racing cyclist
- Christian Becker (born 1972), German film producer
- Christiane Becker (1778–1797), German actress
- Christina Becker (born 1977), German bicycle racer
- Christine Becker, American fencer
- Christoph Becker, Austrian-Canadian academic
- Christopher Becker (born 1980), German film director, screenwriter and film producer
- Clyde Becker (1882–1938), American football player, coach and geologist
- Conrad F. Becker (1905–1965), American businessman and politician
- Cornelius Becker (1561–1604), German Lutheran pastor
- Courtenay Becker-Dey (born 1965), American competitive sailor
- Craig Becker (born 1956), American labor attorney
- Cristiano Becker
- Curt Becker (politician, born 1905) (1905–1987), German politician
- Cynthia J. Becker (born 1957), American judge

=== D ===
- Dale Becker, American mastering engineer
- Daniel Levin Becker (born 1984), American writer
- Danzel Becker (1948–2017), South African cricketer and umpire
- Dave Becker (born 1957), American football player
- David Becker (born 1961), American jazz guitarist
- David M. Becker (1947–2026), American lawyer at the Securities and Exchange Commission
- David Rambo Becker known as David (footballer, born June 1995), Brazilian footballer
- Denese Becker (born 1973), Guatemalan survivor of the Rio Negro massacre
- Desiree Becker (born 1994), German politician
- Diane Becker (born 1969), American film producer
- Diane M. Becker (1943–2021), American nurse and public health scientist
- Diego Becker (born 1997), Argentine footballer
- Dietrich Becker (c.1623–1679), German violinist and composer
- Dirk Becker (born 1966), German politician
- Dismas Becker (1936–2010), American politician
- Dominik Becker (born 2000), German footballer
- Donald Becker, American software developer
- Donna Becker (1932–2023), American baseball player
- Dora Valesca Becker (1870–1958), American musician
- Dorothea Becker (c.1536–1609), German suspected witch
- Dorothy Becker (1900–1989), American swimmer and surfer
- Doug Becker (born 1956), American football player
- Douglas Becker, American dancer

=== E ===
- Eberhard Becker (born 1943), German mathematician
- Ed Becker (died 2007), American businessman and author
- Edmund Becker (born 1956), German footballer and manager
- Edward R. Becker (1933–2006), American judge
- Elena Becker-Barroso, Spanish molecular biologist
- Elisabeth Becker (1923–1946), German concentration camp guard
- Elisabeth Winkelmeier-Becker (born 1962), German lawyer and politician
- Elizabeth Becker (journalist) (born 1947), American author and journalist
- Elizabeth Becker (politician) (born 1969), Namibian politician
- Elizabeth Becker-Pinkston (1903–1989), American diver
- Ellen Becker (born 1960), German rower
- Emma Becker (born 1988), French writer
- Ernest Becker (athletic director) (1914–1998), American tennis player and coach
- Ernie Becker (Canadian football) (1925–2007), Canadian football player
- Eric Becker, American businessperson
- Eric Becker (baseball) (born 2005), American baseball player
- Eric M. B. Becker, American writer and translator
- Esteban Becker (born 1964), Argentine football player and manager
- Ethan Becker, American cookbook author
- Ethan F. Becker, American American writer and speech coach
- Étienne Becker (1936–1995), French cinematographer
- Etta Becker-Donner (1911–1975), Austrian ethnologist

=== F ===
- Fabrice Becker (born 1971), French freestyle skier
- Felicitas Becker (born 1971), German historian
- Felix Becker (art historian) (1864–1928), German art historian
- Felix Becker (fencer) (1964), German fencer
- Felix Becker (officer) (1893–1979), German army officer
- Ferdinand Becker (1846–1877), German painter
- Fernando Becker (born 1955), Spanish economist and politician
- Finn Ole Becker (born 2000), German footballer
- Florence Hague Becker (1886–1971), American clubwoman
- Francis H. Becker (1915–2011), American judge in Iowa
- Frank Becker (canoeist), West German slalom canoeist
- Frank J. Becker (1899–1981), American politician from New York State
- Franz Becker (1918–1965), German footballer
- Franziska Becker (born 1949), German cartoonist
- Franziska Becker (politician) (born 1967), German politician
- Fred Becker (1895–1918), American football player
- Frederick G. Becker (1913–2004), American artist
- Fritz Becker (1888–1963), German footballer
- Fritz Becker (general) (1892–1967), German general

=== G ===
- Gabriele Becker (born 1975), German sprinter
- Gary Becker (1930–2014), American economist
- Gavin Becker (born 1999), American musician and actor
- Gavin de Becker (born 1954), American security specialist and author
- Geoffrey Becker, American writer
- George Becker (composer) (1834–1928), German-Swiss composer and writer on music
- George Becker (labor leader) (1928–2007), American labor leader
- George Becker (musician) (born 1963), American country musician
- George Becker (politician) (1877–1941), Australian politician
- George Becker (wrestler) (1914–1999), American professional wrestler
- George Ferdinand Becker (1847–1919), American geologist
- George Loomis Becker (1829–1904), American politician from Minnesota
- Georges Becker (peintre) (1846–1909), French painter
- Gerd Becker (chemist) (1940–2017), German chemist
- Gerd Becker (handballer) (born 1953), German handball player
- Gerda Becker (born 1956/7), Dutch table tennis player
- Gerhold K. Becker (born 1943), German philosopher
- Germán Becker (born 1980), Argentine tango musician
- Germán Becker Alvear (born 1955), Chilean politician
- Germán Becker Baechler
- Gerry Becker (1951–2019), American actor
- Gesine Becker (1888–1968), German activist and politician
- Gordon Becker (born 1936), Australian cricketer
- Gottfried Becker (pharmacist, born 1681) (1681–1750), Danish pharmacist
- Gottfried Becker (pharmacist, born 1767) (1767–1845), Danish pharmacist and academic
- Gottfried Wilhelm Becker (1778–1854), German physician and writer
- Gregory R. Becker (born 1954), American politician
- Gregory W. Becker (born 1966/7), American banking executive
- Gustav Becker (1819–1885, German clockmaker
- Gustav Becker (weightlifter), Austrian weightlifter
- Gustavo Adolfo Becker (born 1966), Spanish high jumper

=== H ===
- Hal Becker (born 1954), American writer
- Hal de Becker (1931–2021), American dancer and writer
- Hans-Josef Becker (born 1948), German Roman Catholic archbishop
- Hans Becker-Foss (born 1949), German conductor
- Harmony Becker, American cartoonist and illustrator
- Harold Becker (born 1928), American film director
- Harry Becker (artist) (1865–1928), English artist
- Harry Becker (politician) (1892–1980), British politician
- Hartmut Becker (1938–2022), German actor
- Harvey Becker (born 1960), British tennis player
- Heidi Becker-Ramlow (1954–1987), German diver
- Heidi N. Becker, American planetary scientist
- Heini Becker (born 1935), Australian politician
- Heinrich Becker (1770–1822), German actor
- Heinz Becker (1915–1991), German baseball player
- Heinz Becker (musicologist) (1922–2006), German composer and musicologist
- Heinz K. Becker (born 1950), Austrian politician
- Hellmuth Becker (politician) (1902–1962), German Nazi politician
- Hellmuth Becker (SS officer) (1902–1953), German general
- Helmut Becker (1927–1990), German viticulturist
- Hendrik Becker (1661–1722), Dutch colonial administrator
- Herbert L. Becker (born 1951), American magician
- Hermann Becker (1887–1970), WWI German flying ace
- Hermann Heinrich Becker (painter) (1817–1885), German painter and writer
- Hermann Heinrich Becker (politician) (1820–1885), German politician and Mayor
- Hermann Becker-Freyseng (1910–1961), German physician
- Holger Becker (born 1964), German politician
- Howard D. Becker (1914–1995), American painter and watercolorist
- Howard P. Becker (1899–1960), American sociologist
- Howard S. Becker (1928–2023), American sociologist
- Hugo Becker (1863–1941), German cellist
- Hugo Becker (actor) (born 1987), French actor

=== I ===
- Ilse Becker (1912–2004), German lawyer and politician
- Ingrid Becker (born 1942), German athlete
- Ingrid Becker-Inglau (born 1946), German politician
- Irene Becker (born 1952), German nurse and serial killer
- Isabel Lastres Becker (born 1974), Spanish biochemist
- Isabelle Becker (1964–2024), French singer

=== J ===
- Jack Ellerton Becker (1904–1979), Australian entrepreneur
- Jacques Becker (1906–1960), French filmmaker
- Jakob Becker (1810–1872), German artist
- Jamie Becker-Finn (born 1982), American politician
- Jana Becker (born 2006), German middle-distance runner
- Jason Becker (born 1969), American guitarist and composer
- Jason Becker (ice hockey) (born 1974), Canadian ice hockey player
- Jasper Becker (born 1956), British author and journalist
- Jazmín López Becker (born 1992), Argentine windsurfer
- Jean Becker (director) (born 1933), French film director and screenwriter
- Jean Becker (footballer) (1922–2009), Luxembourgish footballer
- Jean Becker (violinist) (1833–1884), German violinist
- Jean-Jacques Becker (1928–2023), French historian
- Jeffrey M. Becker, American microbiologist
- Jens Becker (born 1965), German bassist
- Jérôme Becker (1850–1912), Belgian explorer and artillery officer
- Jerónimo Bécker (1857–1925), Spanish historian and diplomat
- Jessica Becker (bodyboarder), Brazilian bodyboarder
- Jill Becker, American psychological researcher
- Jillian Becker (born 1932), British writer
- Jo Becker, American reporter and author
- João Batista Becker (1870–1946), German-Brazilian Catholic prelate
- Joe Becker (baseball) (1908–1998), American baseball player
- Joe Becker (cyclist) (1931–2014), American cyclist
- Joe Becker (musician) (born 1976), American guitarist and composer
- Joe Becker (Unicode), American computer scientist
- Johan Heinrich Becker (1715–1761), German physician and chemist
- Johann Becker (entomologist) (1932–2004), Brazilian entomologist
- Johann Becker (organist) (1726–1803), German composer and organist
- Johann Becker (politician) (1869–1951), German lawyer and politician
- Johann Gottfried Becker (1639–1711) (1639–1711), Danish pharmacist
- Johann Gottfried Burman Becker (1802–1880), Danish pharmacist and writer
- Johann Philipp Becker (1809–1886), German military officer and revolutionary
- Johannes Heinrich Becker (1898–1961), German Nazi in Australia
- John Becker (basketball) (born 1968), American college basketball coach
- John Becker (politician), American politician from Ohio
- John Becker (writer), American dramatist
- John J. Becker (1886–1961), American composer
- Johnnie Becker (1903–1947), American football player
- Jon Becker (born 1972), American politician
- Jorge Insunza Becker (1936–2019), Chilean politician
- Josef Becker (1905–1996), German politician
- Josh Becker (filmmaker) (1958–2025), American filmmaker
- Josh Becker (politician) (born 1969), American politician from California
- Joshua Becker (born 1974), American writer
- Judith Becker (born 1932), American ethnomusicologist and academic
- Judy Becker, American production designer
- Julie Becker (1972–2016), American artist
- Julie H. Becker (born 1974), American judge
- Jurek Becker (1937–1997), German writer, screenwriter and GDR dissident
- Jürgen Becker (comedian) (born 1959), German comedian and actor
- Jürgen Becker (poet) (1932–2024), German poet and writer

=== K ===
- Kåre Becker (born 1978), Dutch footballer
- Karl Becker (painter) (1820–1900), German painter
- Karl Becker (philologist) (1775–1849), German philologist
- Karl Becker (politician, born 1923) (1923–2002), German politician
- Karl Becker (statistician) (1823–1896), German statistician
- Karl Friedrich Becker (1777–1806), German educator and historian
- Karl Heinrich Emil Becker (1879–1940), German general
- Karl-Heinz Becker (athlete) (1912–2001), German long-distance runner
- Karl-Heinz Becker (pilot) (1918–2006), Luftwaffe jet pilot
- Karl Josef Becker (1928–2015), German Catholic theologian and cardinal-deacon
- Karol Becker, Czechoslovak sprint canoer
- Kathrin Becker, German curator
- Katja Becker (born 1965), German biochemist
- Katrin Becker (born 1967), German theoretical physicist
- KC Becker, American politician from Colorado
- Ken Becker (1932–2007), American sports coach
- Kerstin Becker (born 1969), German writer and poet
- Kim Becker, American politician
- Klaus Becker (born 1953), German steel entrepreneur
- Klaus Becker (civil servant) (1934–2026), German civil servant
- Konrad Becker (born 1959), Austrian media artist and musician
- Kuno Becker (born 1978), Mexican actor
- Kurt Becker (born 1952), German-American investor
- Kurt H. Becker, American physicist and entrepreneur

=== L ===
- Lance Becker (born 1954), American physician and academic
- Lars Becker (born 1954), German film director and screenwriter
- Lawrence Becker (1869–1947), American lawyer and Treasury official
- Lawrence C. Becker (1939–2018), American philosopher
- Léon Becker (1826–1909), Belgian painter
- Leonard F. Becker (1920–1991), American politician and businessman
- Liliane Becker (1942–1981), Luxembourgish gymnast
- Lina Maria Becker (1898–1976), German politician
- Lisa Becker (born 1990), German politician
- Liselotte Becker-Egner (1931–2015), German operatic soprano
- Loftus Becker, American legal scholar
- Lorenz Becker (1889–1952), American politician from Wisconsin
- Louis Becker (born 1962), Danish architect
- Ludwig Becker (architect) (1855–1940), German architect
- Ludwig Becker (astronomer) (1860–1947), British astronomer
- Ludwig Becker (explorer) (1808–1861), German artist, explorer and naturalist
- Ludwig Becker (pilot) (1911–1943), German World War II flying ace
- Ludwig Becker (politician) (1892–1974), German politician and journalist
- Ludwig Hugo Becker (1833–1868), German painter and etcher
- Luke Becker (born 1999), American speedway rider
- Lulu Rowena Becker (1883–1963), American missionary and translator
- Lydia Becker (1827–1890), British amateur scientist and suffragist

=== M ===
- Maike Becker (born 1962), German handball player
- Manfred Becker (born 1960), German-Canadian filmmaker
- Marc Becker (born 1962), American academic
- Marcus Becker (born 1981), German canoeist
- Markus Becker (pianist) (born 1963), German pianist
- Margaret Becker (born 1959), American singer
- Magdalena Hergert Becker (1878–1938), American Mennonite missionary
- Maria Becker (1920–2012), German actress and director
- Mariana Becker (born 1971), Brazilian sports journalist and television reporter
- Marie Alexandrine Becker (1879–1942), Belgian serial killer
- Marie De Becker (1880–1946), English-American actress
- Marion Becker (born 1950), German javelin thrower
- Marion Rombauer Becker (1903–1976), American cookbook writer
- Maritta Becker (born 1981), German ice hockey player and coach
- Marty Becker (1889-1957), American baseball player
- Mary Becker, American politician from Alaska
- Mary Kay Becker (born 1946), American politician from Washington state and judge
- Martin Becker (1916–2006), German fighter pilot
- Mathias Becker (1907–1952), Luxembourgish footballer
- Matthias Becker (born 1974), German footballer
- Maurice Becker (1889–1975), American cartoonist
- Max Becker (politician) (1888–1960), German politician
- Max Joseph Becker (1828–1896), American civil engineer
- May Lamberton Becker (1873–1958), American literary critic
- Maximilian Becker, German politician
- Melanie Becker (1966–2020), German-American physicist
- Meret Becker (born 1969), German actress and singer
- Merle Becker, American television director
- Michael Lewis Becker (born 1940), American advertising creative director
- Miguel Becker
- Mike Becker (born 1943), American bridge player, son of B. Jay Becker
- Miriam Becker (1909–2000), American mathematician
- Moe Becker (1917–1996), American basketball player
- Moritz Becker (1827–1906), American politician in Wisconsin
- Muriel Gustavo Becker known as Muriel (footballer) (born 1987), Brazilian footballer
- Murilo Becker (born 1983), Brazilian basketball player

=== N ===
- Nadja Becker (born 1978), German actress
- Nancy A. Becker (born 1955), American judge
- Nanobah Becker, American filmmaker
- Natalie Becker, South African actress
- Nate Becker (born 1996), American football player
- Neal Dow Becker (1883–1955), American lawyer and diplomat
- Nick Becker (born 1968), American volleyball player
- Nick Becker (baseball) (born 2006), American baseball player
- Nicolas Becker (jurist) (born 1946), German criminal defense lawyer
- Nicolas Becker (sound engineer), French composer and sound engineer
- Nicholas E. Becker (1842–1920), American politician in Wisconsin
- Nicole Becker, Argentine climate activist
- Nicole Blank Becker, American lawyer
- Niels Becker (born 1942), Australian rules footballer and biologist
- Nikolaus Becker (1809–1845), German lawyer and poet
- Nina Becker (born 1974), Brazilian singer-songwriter
- Noah Becker (born 1970), American artist and writer
- Norbert Becker (agroscientist) (1937–2012), German agricultural scientist
- Norbert Becker (biologist) (born 1949), German biologist
- Norma Becker (1930–2006), American activist

=== O ===
- Oscar Patric Sturzen-Becker (1811–1869), Swedish poet and writer
- Oskar Becker (1889–1964), German philosopher
- Oskar Becker (assailant) (1839–1868), German fanatic and failed assassin
- Otie Chew Becker (1880–1953), English violinist and music educator
- Otto Heinrich Enoch Becker (1828–1890), German ophthalmologist
- Otto Becker (equestrian) (born 1958), German equestrian
- Otto Becker (fencer) (1887–1970), Danish fencer

=== P ===
- Pablo Becker (born 1993), Argentine footballer
- Paul Becker, Canadian choreographer
- Paul Becker (admiral) (born 1961), American admiral and intelligence chief
- Paula Modersohn-Becker (1876–1907), German expressionist painter and draftswoman
- Pete Becker, American C++ consultant
- Peter Becker (actor) (born 1979), Anglo-German actor
- Peter Becker (biologist) (born 1958), German molecular biologist
- Peter Becker (curler) (born 1949), New Zealand curler and coach
- Peter Becker (rower) (born 1956), German rower
- Peter Emil Becker (1908–2000), German neurologist, psychiatrist and geneticist
- Philip Becker (1830–1898), American politician
- Philipp Jakob Becker (born 1763), German painter

=== Q ===
- Quinn H. Becker (1930–2022), Surgeon General of the US Army

=== R ===
- Rafael Becker (born 1991), Brazilian professional golfer
- Rainer Becker (born 1961), German chef and restaurateur
- Ralf Becker (born 1970), German footballer and coach
- Ralph Elihu Becker (1907–1994), United States ambassador
- Ralph Becker (Utah politician) (born 1952), American politician, son of Ralph Elihu Becker
- Randi Becker (born 1948), American politician
- Randy Becker (born 1970), American actor and producer
- Randy Becker (racing driver) (born 1952), American racing driver
- Raymond De Becker (1912-1969), Belgian journalist and writer
- Regina Becker-Schmidt (1937–2024), German psychologist and sociologist
- Reinhold Becker (born 1959), German swimmer
- Reinhold Becker (composer) (1842–1924), German composer
- Rich Becker (born 1972), American baseball player
- Richard Becker (music publisher) (1934–2025), American music publisher
- Richard Becker (physicist) (1887–1955), German physicist
- Richard Becker (tennis) (born 1991), German tennis player
- Richard M. Becker (1931–2007), American politician
- Richard L. Becker (1905–2004), American politician
- Richard S. Becker (1926–2015), United States Air Force flying ace
- Rick Becker, American physician and politician from North Dakota
- Robert O. Becker (1923–2008), American orthopedic surgeon
- Robin Becker (born 1951), American poet and academic
- Robin Becker (footballer) (born 1997), German footballer
- Roger Becker (1934–2017), British tennis player
- Roland Becker (1940–2021), German politician
- Rolf Becker (1935–2025), German actor
- Ross Becker, American journalist
- Rudolph Zacharias Becker (1752–1822), German educator and author
- Ruth Elizabeth Becker (1899–1990), Titanic survivor
- Ryan Becker (born 1997), American football player

=== S ===
- Sabine Becker (born 1959), German speed skater
- Saga Becker (born 1988), Swedish actress
- Sally Becker (born 1962), British humanitarian aid worker
- Samuel William Becker, American dermatologist who documented Becker's nevus
- Sandra Becker (born 1967), German artist
- Sandra Lynne Becker (1947–2015), American beauty pageant contestant
- Sandro Becker (born 1971), Brazilian footballer
- Sandy Becker (1922–1996), American announcer, actor and comedian
- Sarah Becker (1813–1901), American linguist
- Saul Becker, British academic and social scientist
- Scott Becker (born 1984), New Zealand curler and coach
- Sebastian Becker (born 1985), German footballer
- Sean Becker (born 1975), New Zealand curler, brother of Scott Becker
- Sean Michael Becker (born 1981), American film director
- Serge Becker (born 1961), Swiss creative director and nightlife designer
- Sharon Becker, American actress
- Sherburn M. Becker (1876–1949), American politician in Wisconsin
- Simon Fisher-Becker (1961–2025), British actor
- Sheraldo Becker (born 1995), Surinamese footballer
- Sophie Becker (born 1997), Irish sprinter
- Sophie Becker (actor and ventriloquist) (born 1993/4), American actor and ventriloquist
- Steven Becker (born 1947), American politician from Kansas
- Sunshine Becker (born 1972), American singer
- Suzy Becker (born 1962), American writer
- Sven Becker (born 1968), German gynaecologist and academic

=== T ===
- Tal Becker (born 1972), Australian-Israeli lawyer
- Tanja Becker-Bender (born 1978), German violinist
- Terry Becker (1921–2014), American actor, director and producer
- Théo Becker (born 1976), Brazilian actor and singer
- Theodor Becker (1840–1928), Danish-German civil engineer and entomologist
- Theodor Becker (actor) (1880–1952), German actor
- Thomas Becker (bobsleigh) (born 1948), American bobsledder
- Thomas Becker (canoeist born 1967) (born 1967), German slalom canoeist
- Thomas Becker (canoeist, born 1990) (born 1990), German slalom canoeist
- Thomas Albert Andrew Becker (1832–1899), American Catholic bishop
- Thorsten Becker (born 1980), German footballer
- Timo Becker (born 1997), German footballer
- Tom Becker (writer) (born 1981), British children's writer
- Tom Becker (baseball) (born 1975), Australian baseball pitcher
- Tom Becker (basketball) (1923–1991), American basketball player
- Tony Becker (born 1963), American actor

=== U ===
- Uwe Becker (born 1955), German middle-distance runner

=== V ===
- Valentin Eduard Becker (1814–1890), German composer
- Vaneta Becker (born 1949), American politician
- Vasco Becker-Weinberg (born 1979), Portuguese politician
- Verena Becker (born 1952), German terrorist
- Vincent Becker (born 1947), Irish rugby union footballer
- Vitalie Becker (born 2005), German footballer

=== W ===
- Waldemar Becker (1840–1907), Finnish soldier and politician
- Walt Becker (born 1968), American filmmaker
- Walter Becker (1950–2017), American musician and record producer
- Walter Becker (cyclist) (1932–2012), German cyclist
- Wayland Becker (1910–1984), American football player
- Wayne M. Becker (1940–2025), American botanist
- Wilhelm Adolf Becker (1796–1846), German classical scholar
- Wilhelm Gottlieb Becker (1753–1813), German art historian and numismatist
- Willi Becker (1918–1977), German politician
- William D. Becker (1876–1943), American mayor of St. Louis
- William H. Becker (1909–1992), American judge in Missouri
- William J. Becker (1927–2015), American theatre critic
- William W. Becker (1921–2007), American entrepreneur
- Wiren Becker, American electrical engineer
- Wolfgang Becker (director, born 1910) (1910–2005), German film director and editor
- Wolfgang Becker (director, born 1954) (1954–2024), German filmmaker

=== Y ===
- Yannis Becker (born 1991), German footballer

=== Middle name ===
- Herman Becker Fast (1887–1938), American businessman, farmer, and politician

== See also ==
- Beckers, surname
- Beck (surname)
- Becke, surname
- Beckner, surname
- Becher, surname
- Bekker
- Beker
- Becquer (disambiguation)
- Gustavo Adolfo Bécquer (1836–1870), Spanish poet
