= George Becker =

George Becker may refer to:

- George Becker (labor leader) (1928–2007), American steelworker and president of the United Steelworkers
- George Becker (politician) (1877–1941), Australian politician
- George Becker (composer) (1834–1928), German-Swiss composer and writer on music
- George Becker (musician) (born 1963), American musician
- George Ferdinand Becker (1847–1919), American geologist
- George Loomis Becker (1829–1904), lawyer and mayor of Saint Paul, Minnesota
