= John Becker =

John Becker may refer to:

- John J. Becker (1886–1961), American composer
- John Becker (writer), writer based in the Washington, D.C. area
- John Becker (basketball) (born 1968), head coach of the University of Vermont men's basketball team
- John Becker (politician), member of the Ohio House of Representatives
- John Becker, fictional character from the TV series Becker
- Johnnie Becker (1903–1947), American football player, played in the NFL (1926–1929)
