= Hélène Bergès =

French biologist

- Born: 27 August 1966 (age 60); Pau, France
- Education: University of Toulouse III
- Awards: IWGSC Leadership Award (2019); Vermeil Medal of French Academy of Agriculture (2015); Legion of Honor (2015); Order of Agricultural Merit (2013)
- Scientific career
- Fields: Genomics
- Thesis: Etude de l'export de protéïnes hétérologues chez la bactérie Escherichia coli (1995)

Hélène Bergès (born August 27, 1966 in Pau) is a French scientist and was the Director of the French Plant Genomic Resources Center from its foundation until 2019.

== Education ==
Bergès completed a doctorate in 1995 at the Toulouse III - Paul Sabatier University in the fields of genetics and molecular biology.

== Career ==
After her PhD, Bergès joined the National Institute for Agricultural Research (INRA) in 1998, to first focus on research in studying plant interactions with microbes. In 2003, her position at INRA allowed her to found a separate department called the French Plant Genomic Resources Center (CNRGV) where she was the director until 2019. Employing some twenty people, the CNRGV is involved in various international sequencing consortia, develops various projects funded by the French Government (Grand Emprunt), the French National Research Agency (ANR) or the European Union, in collaboration with various laboratories all around the world. Along other activities, Hélène Bergès is member of the scientific committee of the Parliamentary Office for the Evaluation of Scientific and Technological Options (OPECST). In 2021, she was one of the researchers highlighted in the " La Science taille XX elles" exhibition presented in Toulouse.

== Research ==
Bergès' early research used Escherichia coli as a model system to examine cytokines and plasmid copy numbers. She then moved on to examine the bacterial cells associated with plant roots including the development of microarrays which allowed her to quantify gene expression in these bacteria. She was an early adopter of the need to sequence plant genomes, and her recent work includes large-scale sequencing projects including those generating genomic information on barley, wheat, and sunflowers.

== Selected publications ==
- International Barley Genome Sequencing Consortium; et al. (November 2012). "A physical, genetic and functional sequence assembly of the barley genome". Nature. 491 (7426): 711–716. Bibcode:2012Natur.491..711T. doi:10.1038/nature11543. hdl:2440/76951. PMID 23075845. S2CID 10170672.
- Becker, Anke; Bergès, Hélène; Krol, Elizaveta; Bruand, Claude; Rüberg, Silvia; Capela, Delphine; Lauber, Emmanuelle; Meilhoc, Eliane; Ampe, Frédéric; de Bruijn, Frans J.; Fourment, Joëlle; Francez-Charlot, Anne; Kahn, Daniel; Küster, Helge; Liebe, Carine; Pühler, Alfred; Weidner, Stefan; Batut, Jacques (1 March 2004). "Global Changes in Gene Expression in Sinorhizobium meliloti 1021 under Microoxic and Symbiotic Conditions". Molecular Plant-Microbe Interactions. 17 (3): 292–303. Bibcode:2004MPMI...17..292B. doi:10.1094/MPMI.2004.17.3.292. ISSN 0894-0282. PMID 15000396.
- Young, Nevin D.; Debellé, Frédéric; Oldroyd, Giles E. D.; Geurts, Rene; Cannon, Steven B.; Udvardi, Michael K.; et al. (December 2011). "The Medicago genome provides insight into the evolution of rhizobial symbioses". Nature. 480 (7378): 520–524. Bibcode:2011Natur.480..520Y. doi:10.1038/nature10625. PMC 3272368. PMID 22089132.
- Yousfi, Fatma-Ezzahra; Makhloufi, Emna; Marande, William; Ghorbel, Abdel W.; Bouzayen, Mondher; Bergès, Hélène (31 January 2017). "Comparative Analysis of WRKY Genes Potentially Involved in Salt Stress Responses in Triticum turgidum L. ssp. durum". Frontiers in Plant Science. 7: 2034. Bibcode:2017FrPS....7.2034Y. doi:10.3389/fpls.2016.02034. PMC 5281569. PMID 28197152.
- Bergès, Hélène; Lauber, Emmanuelle; Liebe, Carine; Batut, Jacques; Kahn, Daniel; Bruijn, Frans J. de; Ampe, Frédéric (2003). "Development of Sinorhizobium meliloti Pilot Macroarrays for Transcriptome Analysis". Applied and Environmental Microbiology. 69 (2): 1214–1219. Bibcode:2003ApEnM..69.1214B. doi:10.1128/AEM.69.2.1214-1219.2003. PMC 143623. PMID 12571049.
- Bergès, Hélène; Checroun, Claire; Guiral, Sébastien; Garnerone, Anne-Marie; Boistard, Pierre; Batut, Jacques (2001). "A glutamine-amidotransferase-like protein modulates FixT anti-kinase activity in Sinorhizobium meliloti". BMC Microbiology. 1 (1): 6. doi:10.1186/1471-2180-1-6. PMC 32199. PMID 11389771.
- Bergès, H; Oreglia, J; Joseph-Liauzun, E; Fayet, O (February 1997). "Isolation and characterization of a priB mutant of Escherichia coli influencing plasmid copy number of delta rop ColE1-type plasmids". Journal of Bacteriology. 179 (3): 956–958. doi:10.1128/jb.179.3.956-958.1997. PMC 178782. PMID 9006055.

== Awards and honors ==
The National Institute for Agricultural Research gave Bergès their 2012 engineering award. She was one of ten recipients of the 2015 Vermeil Medal of the French Academy of Agriculture, and she was given the 2018 "Outstanding Leadership Award" from the International Wheat Genome Sequencing Consortium, for "her leadership in BAC pooling and BAC libraries". In 2015, she was made Knight of Legion of Honour, and she is also a Knight of the Order of Agricultural Merit.
