= Charles Becker (disambiguation) =

Charles Becker (1870–1915) was a New York City police officer convicted of murder.

Charles or Charlie Becker may also refer to:

- Charles Becker (politician) (1840–1908), German-American politician from Illinois
- Charles J. Becker (1924–2007), American politician from Missouri
- Charlie Becker (actor) (1887–1968), German-American actor
- Charlie Becker (baseball) (1890–1928), American Major League Baseball pitcher
- Charlie Becker (American football), American college football wide receiver
