= Beckner =

Beckner is a surname. Notable people with the surname include:

- Dick Beckner (1927–1997), American gymnast
- Jack Beckner (1930–2016), American artistic gymnast, coach, and referee
- Terry Beckner (born 1997), American football player
- William Beckner (disambiguation), multiple people

== See also ==
- Becker
