= Caroline Becker =

Finnish photographer (1826–1881)

Caroline Becker (1826–1881) was the first professional female photographer in Finland.

As a widow, she managed the former studio of her brother in Vyborg between 1859 and 1862. She also managed a toy-shop. Becker was the first professional female photographer in Finland: Hedvig Keppler (1831–1882) became the second in Turku later that same year, followed by four other women photographers with shortlived careers before Julia Widgrén became the first celebrity female photographer in Finland in the late 1860s.
