= Ilse Becker =

German lawyer and politician (1912–2004)

Ilse Becker-Döring (born 15 September 1912 in Frankfurt; died 5 April 2004) was a German lawyer and politician, a member of the Christian Democratic Union of Germany.

Becker-Döring passed the first state examination in law at the Higher Regional Court in Frankfurt in 1944 and did her doctorate on 28 April 1949 at the University of Frankfurt am Main on a divorce law topic. In 1951, she founded her own law firm with a focus on family law and was the first lawyer to be admitted to the Braunschweig Chamber. Between 1961 and 1972, she was councilor and also between 1966 and 1972 the 1st mayor of the city of Braunschweig.
