= Jerónimo Bécker =

Spanish historian and diplomat (1857–1925)

- Born: December 2, 1857
- Died: May 25, 1925 (aged 67)
- Other name: Jerónimo Bécker y González

Jerónimo Bécker y González (2 December 1857 – 25 May 1925) was a Spanish historian, diplomat and journalist.

Bécker was born in Salamanca. He became a member of the Real Sociedad Geográfica de España in 1913, and was awarded the Knight Grand Cross of the Order of Isabella the Catholic in 1914. He died in Madrid, aged 67.
