= Wayne M. Becker =

American botanist (1940–2025)

Wayne M. Becker (May 29, 1940 – October 6, 2025) was an American botanist, professor of botany at the University of Wisconsin. Under the name W. M. Becker he was the original author, and for the next six editions, senior author of The World of the Cell (Pearson).

== Life ==
Becker first joined the University of Wisconsin in 1958 and obtained his PhD in 1967. He received his B.S, M.S., and Ph.D in biochemistry at this college. Becker spent two years in the United Kingdom as a NATO/NIH postdoctoral researcher, and then returned to the campus in 1969 as a member of the Botany Department Faculty. He also spent a year in the same position at the University of Edinburgh.

In 1995, he put his research aside and began to focus on undergraduate teaching, especially students of color and those from poor backgrounds. He has also taught at the University of Indonesia in Jakarta; Canterbury University at Christchurch, New Zealand; University of Puerto Rico at Mayaguez; and the Interfaculty Program in Biomedical Ethics at Harvard University.

== Works ==
- Becker, W. M.; Kleinsmith, L.J.; Hardin, J.; Bertoni, G.P. (2008). The World of the Cell (7th ed.). San Francisco: Benjamin/Cummings. ISBN 978-0-8053-9393-4.
- Bertoni, G. P.; W. M. Becker (1996). "Expression of the cucumber hydroxypyruvate reductase gene is down-regulated by elevated CO2". Plant Physiology. 112 (2): 599–605. doi:10.1104/pp.112.2.599. JSTOR 4277365. PMC 157983. PMID 12226414.
- Daniel, S.G.; W.M. Becker (1995). "Transgenic analysis of the 5' and 3'-flanking regions of the NADH-dependent hydroxypyruvate reductase gene from Cucumis sativus L". Plant Molecular Biology. 28 (5): 821–836. doi:10.1007/BF00042068. PMID 7640355. S2CID 23301549.
- Bertoni, G. P.; W. M. Becker (1993). "Effects of light fluence and wavelength on expression of the gene encoding cucumber hydroxypyruvate reductase". Plant Physiology. 103 (3): 933–941. doi:10.1104/pp.103.3.933. PMC 159066. PMID 8022942.
- Sloan, J. S.; B. W. Schwartz; W. M. Becker (1993). "Promoter analysis of a light-regulated gene encoding hydroxypyruvate reductase, an enzyme of the photorespiratory glycolate pathway". Plant Journal. 3 (6): 867–874. doi:10.1111/j.1365-313X.1993.00867.x.
