= Maike Becker =

German handball player (born 1962)

Personal information
- Nationality: German
- Born: 12 April 1962 (age 64) Esens, Lower Saxony, West Germany
- Height: 182 cm (72 in)

Sport
- Sport: Handball
National team
Years	Team	Apps
–	West Germany	39

Teams managed
- Years: Team
- 2002-2006: VfL Oldenburg assistant
- 2006-2011: VfL Oldenburg youth
- 2002-2011: Germany assistant
- 2011-13: Bayer 04 Leverkusen youth
- 2017-: VfL Oldenburg

Maike Balthazar (née Maike Becker 12 April 1962 in Esens, Lower Saxony) is a German handball player and coach who played for the West German national team. She represented West Germany at the 1984 Summer Olympics in Los Angeles, where the West German team placed fourth. She played for TuS Esens, MTV Aurich, VfL Oldenburg, TuS Walle Bremen and Harpstedter TB. In 1981 she won the DHB-pokal with VfL Oldenburg.

== Coaching career ==
From 2002 to 2011 she was a part of the coaching staff at VfL Oldenburg, where she had also played. From 2002 to 2006 as assistant and from 2006 to 2011 as Youth Coordinator. In this period she was also coaching the German youth national team.

In 2011 she became the became the youth coach at Bayer 04 Leverkusen, where she was until 2013.

In December 2017 she became the head coach of VfL Oldenburg.

== Private life ==
She has a degree in pedagogy.
