= Saul Becker =

British academic and social scientist

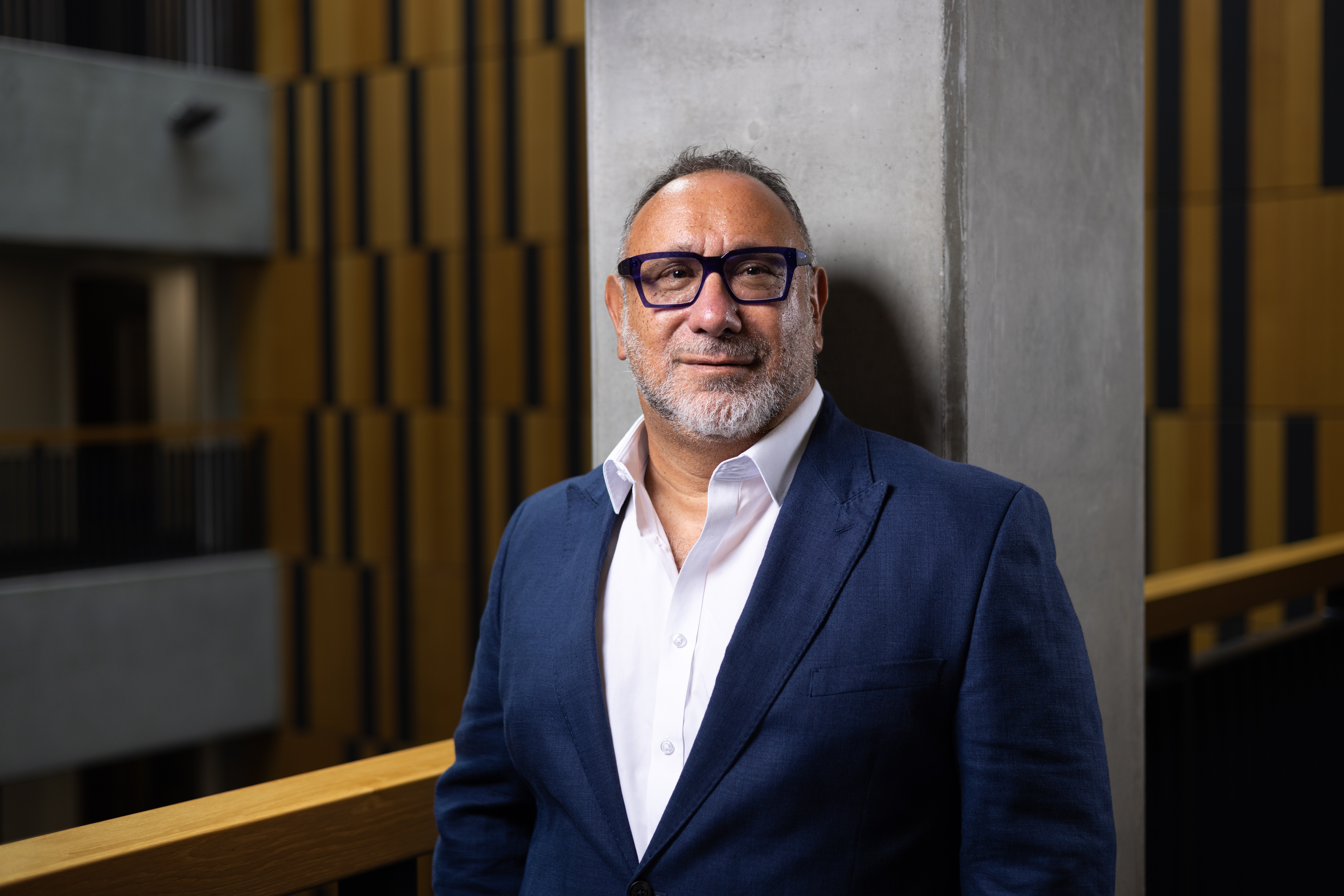
- Known for: Research on young carers, social work and social policy

Academic background
- Education: University of Nottingham

Academic work
- Discipline: Social work, social policy, children and childhood
- Institutions: Manchester Metropolitan University

Saul Becker FAcSS FRSA DL is a British academic and social scientist known for his work on young carers, with Carers Trust and Caring Together Charity. He is an author and editor of 18 books, including Young Carers and their Families and Responding to Poverty. Since 2023 he has been the Pro-Vice-Chancellor and Head of the Faculty of Health and Education at Manchester Metropolitan University, and Founding Director of the Institute for Children's Futures. In 2025 Becker was appointed Deputy Lieutenant of Greater Manchester and is a trustee of various charities including the Manchester United Foundation.

== Early life and education ==
Becker is a former pupil of Rossall School and a graduate of the University of Nottingham: BA (1981); MA (1983); and PhD (1987). His Doctorate was on the relationships between poverty and the use of social services. He is a Fellow of the Academy of Social Sciences and the Royal Society of Arts and is a Registered Social Worker with Social Work England. He practiced as a local authority social worker and senior welfare rights officer before becoming a full-time academic.

== Career ==
In May 2022, Becker was appointed Professor of Children and Families at Manchester Metropolitan University. Previous posts held include: Director of Research & Andrew and Virginia Rudd Professor of Social Care Research and Education Practice, Faculty of Education, University of Cambridge; Provost and Deputy Vice-Chancellor of the University of Sussex; Pro-Vice-Chancellor and Head of the College of Social Sciences, University of Birmingham; Assistant Pro-Vice-Chancellor (Internationalisation), University of Nottingham; Head of the School of Social Policy and Sociology, University of Nottingham; Director of Research, Institute of Applied Social Studies, University of Birmingham; Co-Founder and Associate Director, Centre for Child and Family Research, Loughborough University.

Becker has served as principal investigator on 56 externally-funded research projects.

== Publications ==
He held the post of chair of the Social Policy Association and the founding series editor for the Policy Press Understanding Welfare book series. He and his work have featured in nine television documentaries. In 2025 Becker was appointed Deputy Lieutenant of Greater Manchester and is a trustee of various charities including the Manchester United Foundation.
