= Klaus Becker (civil servant) =

German civil servant (1934–2026)

- Born: 27 November 1934; Celle, Gau Eastern Hanover, Germany
- Died: 3 September 2026 (aged 91); Hanover, Lower Saxony, Germany
- Education: University of Freiburg; University of Göttingen
- Occupation: Civil servant

Klaus Becker (27 November 1934 – 3 September 2026) was a German civil servant.

Becker served as Regierungspräsident of Lüneburg from 1981 to 1990. During his tenure, he suppressed the 1984 protests against the Erkundungsbergwerk Gorleben in Lüchow-Dannenberg.

Becker died in Hanover on 3 September 2026, at the age of 91.
