= Lulu Rowena Becker =

American missionary and translator (1883–1963)

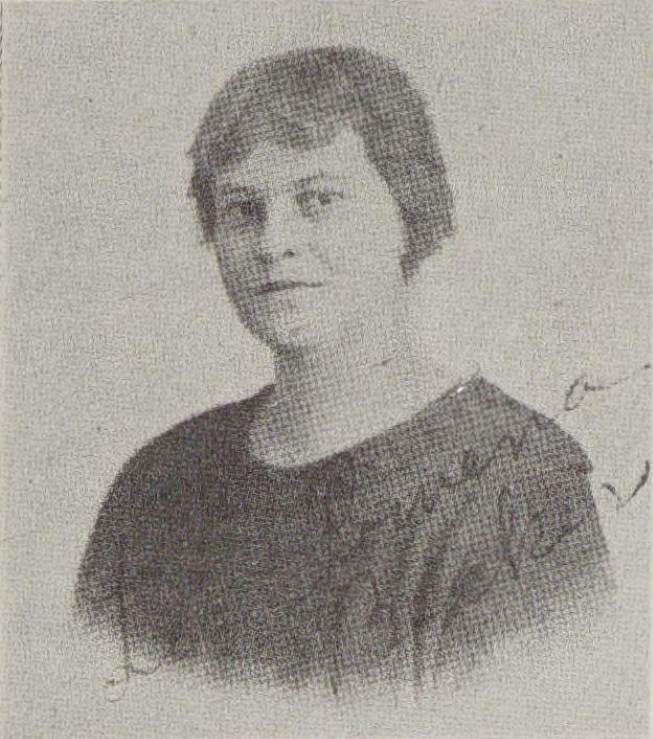
- Born: July 31, 1883; Ransom Township
- Died: October 21, 1963; Winter Garden
- Occupations: Missionary, translator

Lulu Rowena Becker (July 31, 1883 – October 21, 1963) was an American Baptist missionary, Sango language translator, and songwriter in the Central African Republic.

Lulu Rowena Becker was born on July 31, 1883 in Ransom Township, Michigan, the daughter of a lumberman. She attended the University of Michigan and relocated to New York City. She embraced religion in 1917 and graduated from the Moody Bible Institute in Chicago. In 1920 she joined Mid-Africa Mission of Rev. William Haas and was one of five people who accompanied him to French Equatorial Africa. Becker worked in Bangassou, Fort Sibut, Fouroumbala, and Satema in the colony of Ubangi-Shari (the present day Central African Republic). Her church in Bangassou was referred to as “Nzapa-ti-Madama” (“God-of-Madame” in Sango) to distinguish it from the local Catholic church.

Becker developed an orthography for the Sango language. She worked on the translation teams to translate the New Testament and later the Old Testament into the Sango language. She wrote the Sango language works Testamenti ti Fini: Ti Seigneur na Sauveur ti ani Jésus-Christ (1938) and Tèné-Ndjoni so Jean Assala na Mbèti (1960) as well as a number of Sango language songs.

Lulu Rowena Becker died on 21 October 1963 in Winter Garden, Florida.
