= Betsy Becker =

American statistician and researcher

Betsy Jane Becker is an American researcher on meta-analysis and educational psychometrics. She is the Mode L. Stone Distinguished Professor of Educational Statistics in the Department of Statistics at Florida State University, and previously served as the Chair of the Department of Educational Psychology and Learning Systems at Florida State. Becker is a co-author of a heavily cited consensus report on standards for meta-analysis in epidemiology.

In 1978, Becker completed both a bachelor's degree and master's degree in psychology at Johns Hopkins University. She earned a Ph.D. in education from the University of Chicago in 1985; her dissertation, supervised by Larry V. Hedges, was Applying Tests of Combined Significance: Hypotheses and Power Considerations. She joined the Michigan State University faculty as an instructor in 1983, in the Department of Educational Psychology and Special Education, and became a regular-rank faculty member on completing her Ph.D. in 1985. At Michigan State, she directed the Office of Research Consultation from 1983 to 1990. She moved to Florida State in 2004, and became the Mode L. Stone Distinguished Professor in 2009.

Becker has been a fellow of the American Statistical Association since 2008, and of the American Educational Research Association since 2013.
