= Merle Becker =

American television director

Merle Becker is an American television producer and director, and the founder of the independent film company Freakfilms, Inc.

== Career ==
Becker was involved in MTV Animation's late-1990s programming, including Beavis and Butthead, Daria, Station Zero, and Cartoon Sushi. She left MTV in early 2000 to start Freakfilms and worked on Comedy Central's Tough Crowd with Colin Quinn.

She has also worked on the 59th Annual Tony Awards, as well as various other shows for Fuse, VH1 and MTV.

In 2004, Becker produced and directed a documentary, Saving Newburgh.

In 2009, Becker produced and directed the award-winning documentary American Artifact: The Rise of American Rock Poster Art, which is now featured in the Rock and Roll Hall of Fame Museum.

Merle also won a Telly Award for her YouTube channel, "DIY Film with Merle Becker" in 2023.
