= Julia Widgrén =

Finnish photographer (1842–1917)

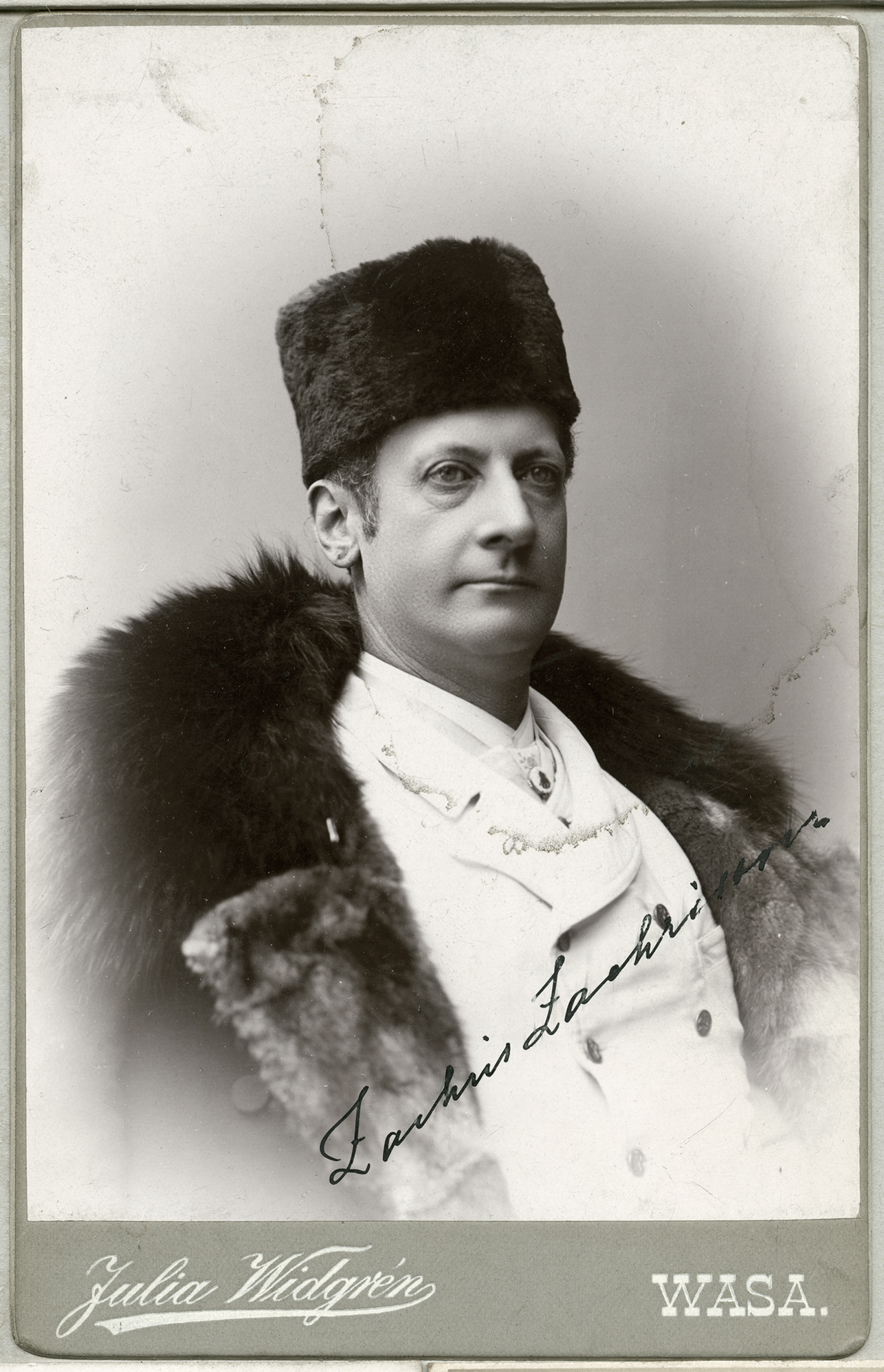
Zachris Zachrisson, portrait by Julia Widgrén

Julia Widgrén (1842–1917) was a Finnish photographer. She was one of the first professional female photographers in Finland.

She had a studio in Vaasa between 1866 and 1904. The first photographs of Vaasa is assumed to have been taken by her. She is known for her images of people in folk costumes from Ostrobothnia, which were made into paintings by the artists Rudolf Åkerblom and Arvid Liljelund.

Her work is held in the Yale University archive collection, and in the Swedish Performing Arts Agency.
