= Heinz K. Becker =

Austrian politician (born 1950)

Heinz K. Becker MEP
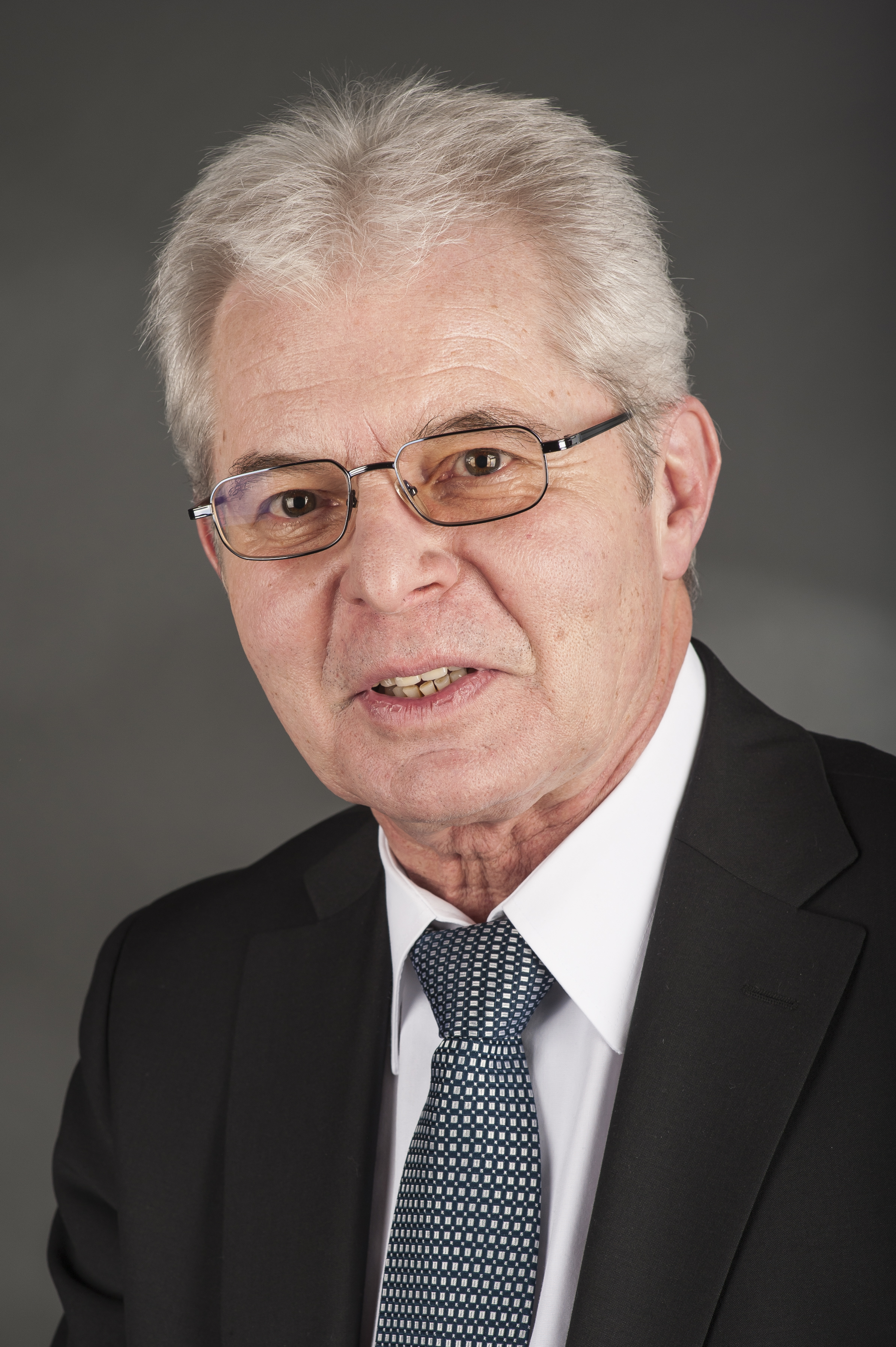

Member of the European Parliament
- In office 1 April 2011 – 2019
- Constituency: Austria

Personal details
- Born: Heinz Kanns Becker; 29 May 1950 (age 76) Baden bei Wien, Austria
- Party: Austrian; Austrian People's Party; EU; European People's Party
- Education: Vienna University
- Website: www.becker-europa.eu

Heinz Kurt Becker (born 29 June 1950) is an Austrian politician who served as a Member of the European Parliament (MEP) from 2011 until 2019. He is a member of the Austrian People's Party, part of the European People's Party.

== Parliamentary service ==
- Committee on Employment and Social Affairs (2011–2012)
- Committee on Petitions (2011-)
- Delegation for relations with Canada (2011–2019)
- Committee on Employment and Social Affairs (2012–2014)
- Committee on Civil Liberties, Justice and Home Affairs (2014–2019)

In addition to his committee assignments, Becker served as a member of the European Parliament Intergroup on Trade Unions.
