= Nicole Blank Becker =

American lawyer

- Born: Michigan, USA
- Education: Wayne State University Law School
- Occupation: Attorney
- Employer(s): Blank Law, PC
- Known for: Defending R. Kelly
- Website: https://nicoleblankbecker.com/

Nicole Blank Becker is a Michigan-based lawyer known for being the defense litigator of R&B singer, Robert Sylvester Kelly.

== Career ==
Becker began her career by working for Legal Aid Defender Office in Detroit, then Wayne County Prosecutor's office. Before starting her own private law firm Blank Law, PC, in 2018 in Troy, Michigan, Becker served as the Chief of Macomb County's sex crimes unit and child abuse unit since 2005. She initially worked as a prosecutor, but then later switched to being a defense litigator.

Though Becker has represented many clients, she came to attention in March 2019, after taking R. Kelly as her client. She also claimed that the Lifetime show, Surviving R. Kelly, is biased and has been directed in a negative way.

In 2020, she represented Jason Dean from Livonia. Dean was a coach and teacher at Northville High School when one of his past students from 2010 accused him of sexual charges. Becker also handled the case of David Shagena who was a volunteer and was accused of sexually assaulting minors in The River Church, Fort Gratiot. Becker also appears on many media outlets as an expert on sexual assault cases.

== Personal life ==
Becker's father, Daniel Blank, was also a criminal defense attorney that handled similar cases. Becker claims that her father influenced her to become a full-time litigator representing sexually alleged/convicted clients.
