= Denese Becker =

Guatemalan survivor of the Rio Negro massacre (born 1973)

Denese Becker (born Dominga Sic Ruiz in 1973) was a survivor of the Río Negro massacres. At 11 she was adopted by an evangelical pastor and his wife in Iowa. She became the subject of a PBS documentary.
