= Regina Becker-Schmidt =

German psychologist and sociologist (1937–2024)

- Becker-Schmidt, c. 2000
- Born: 6 May 1937
- Died: 14 September 2024 (aged 87)
- Education: Goethe University Frankfurt; Sorbonne
- Scientific career
- Fields: Sociology and Social Psychology
- Workplaces: Leibniz University Hannover

Regina Becker-Schmidt (6 May 1937 – 14 September 2024) was a German psychologist and sociologist who was professor at the Institute of Sociology and Social Psychology at the Leibniz University Hannover. Her research focused on corporate and subject theory, critical theory, psychoanalytically oriented social psychology and gender studies. She is considered a seminal figure in feminist critical theory.

== Life and career ==
Becker-Schmidt was born on 6 May 1937. Starting in 1957, Becker-Schmidt studied sociology, philosophy, economics and social psychology at the Goethe University Frankfurt, and at the Sorbonne in Paris. Muharrem Acikgöz situated her in the second generation of the Frankfurt School; she was a student of Adorno's. From 1964 to 1972 she worked as a research assistant and from 1968 as an assistant professor at the Institute for Social Research in Frankfurt. In 1973 she was appointed professor at Leibniz University Hannover at the new Institute of Sociology and Social Psychology, a post that she held until her retirement in 2002.

In particular, Becker-Schmidt influenced the development of feminist critical theory, especially in German-speaking countries. Her approach was associated with the so-called Hannoverian approach in feminist-oriented sociology.

She criticised the positions of critical theory, especially Adorno and Horkheimer, with regard to their ambivalent attitude to the complex of gender relations and how these critical theorists were oblivious to feminism. She focused on gender relations as an integral part of critical theory. She distinguished herself from other feminist critical theorists in her empirical orientation, following Max Horkheimer, who argued that "larger philosophical questions" guide empirical research; and empirical research, in turn, guides larger philosophical questions.

Becker-Schmidt conducted empirical research on female factory workers, developing her own social theory based on her findings. Her first project was entitled "Problems of Mothers who are Wage Laborers", and consisted of interviews with sixty factory workers, of whom half who were still working and half who had withdrawn from factory work. Her research shed light on the "double burden" faced by women factory workers: the responsibility for domestic work combined with the responsibility for contributing to the income of the family. She developed the concept of double socialization of women through wage labour and domestic work: the two spheres come from two different social realms with different logics, and were both separated and connected. Her research focused on both the objective demands of work, and the subjective realities of the worker. In each setting, time functioned differently: in the factory, women must not lose time; while when taking care of children, women must forget about time. The two realms were seen as recombined through relationships (assumed to be heterosexual) and in the efforts of women to have both a career and family life.

She was honoured for her life's work the Deutsche Gesellschaft für Soziologie in 2020.

Becker-Schmidt died on 14 September 2024 after a severe illness, at the age of 87.

== Publications ==
- 1989: Identitätslogik und Gewalt: zum Verhältnis von Kritischer Theorie und Feminismus
- 1994: Im Gespräch: Regina Becker-Schmidt mit Helga Bilden und Karin Flaake. Journal für Psychologie, 2(3): 58–65
- 2000: with Knapp, Gudrun-Axeli: Feministische Theorien zur Einführung. 1st ed. 2000; 4. revised in 2007. Hamburg: Junius.
- 2001: Die Bedeutung weiblicher Arbeitsbiografien für eine selbstbestimmte Interessenvertretung von Frauen. In: Claussen, Detlev/ Negt, Oskar/Werz, Michael (ed.): Philosophie und Empirie. Hannoversche Schriften 4. 69–94
- 2001: Was mit Macht getrennt ist, gehört gesellschaftlich zusammen. Zur Dialektik von Umverteilung und Anerkennung in Phänomenen sozialer Ungleichstellung. In: Knapp, Gudrun-Axeli]/Wetterer, Angelika (eds.): Soziale Verortung der Geschlechter. Gesellschaftstheorie und feministische Kritik. Münster. 91–132
- 2002 (ed.): Gender and Work in Transition. Globalisation in Western, Middle and Eastern Europe. Leske + Budrich, Opladen
- 2003: Zur doppelten Vergesellschaftung von Frauen, Gender-politik-online
- 2003: Adorno kritisieren – und dabei von ihm lernen. Von der Bedeutung seiner Theorie für die Geschlechterforschung. Lecture on 6 July 2003 in Frankfurt am Main, Die Lebendigkeit kritischer Gesellschaftstheorie. Arbeitstagung aus Anlass des 100. Geburtstages von Theodor W. Adorno. Moderation: Ulrich Oevermann.
- 2003: Erkenntniskritik, Wissenschaftskritik, Gesellschaftskritik – Positionen von Donna Haraway und Theodor W. Adorno kontrovers diskutiert. IWM Working Paper No 1/2003, Vienna.
- 2003: Umbrüche in Arbeitsbiografien von Frauen. Regionale Konstellationen und globale Entwicklungen. In: Knapp; Gudrun-Axeli/Wetterer, Angelika (Hrsg.): Achsen der Differenz. Münster. 101–132
- 2016: Pendelbewegungen – Annäherung an eine feministische Gesellschafts- und Subjekttheorie. Aufsätze aus den Jahren 1991–2015. Opladen-Berlin-Toronto. Barbara Budrich
- 2016: Einerlei statt Allerlei. Identitätslogische Konstruktionen in gesellschaftlichen Rationalisierungsprozessen und Identitätszwänge in Geschlechterordnungen. In: Müller, Stefan/Mende, Janne (eds.): Differenz und Identität. Konstellationen der Kritik. Weinheim and Basel: Beltz Juventa. 181–201
