= Bill Becker =

American journalist (1916–2010)

Bill Becker (November 10, 1916 – January 27, 2010) was an American journalist noted for his coverage of nuclear weapons tests, political campaigns, scientific advances, and major sporting events. He covered over 25 Rose Bowls and five World Series.

== Education ==
Becker attended the College of the Pacific, now the University of the Pacific (UOP) in Stockton, California. While there he played football under coach, Amos Alonzo Stagg.

== Career ==
Becker started his journalism career at the Arizona Republic. In 1944, he joined the Associated Press and covered numerous atomic tests. In 1956, he began a long career at The New York Times which resulted in over 600 articles. In 1957, he spent five months in Antarctica as a Times reporter during the International Geophysical Year.

From 1964 to 1966, he worked as writer for Universal Studios, returning to journalism in 1966 as a science writer for Caltech's Jet Propulsion Laboratory in Pasadena, California, while continuing to cover major sporting events for The New York Times.

== Awards ==
Becker was awarded the University of the Pacific's Amos Alonzo Stagg Award of Merit in 2008.

== Selected articles ==
- Becker, Bill, "Fiery Cloud Dims the Sun as ‘Medium” Rips Desert", The Washington Post, October 29, 1951, p. 12
- Becker, Bill, "The Man Who Sets Off Atomic Bombs", Saturday Evening Post, April 19, 1952, p. 32–33, 185–188.
- Becker, Bill, "100 U.S. Scientists Briefed on International Geophysical Year", The New York Times, September 17, 1957. p. 18
- Becker, Bill, Delays are Seen on Man in Space; Von Braun and Others Cite Hazards—Hit on Moon by Rocket Is Doubted", The New York Times, November 24, 1958. p. 15
- Becker, Bill, "X-15 Flies 2,650 M.P.H., Cracking Record; 9-Minute Desert Test Utilizes New Engine With Giant Thrust", The New York Times, March 8, 1961. p. 1
- Becker, Bill, "Angels Doing Well... Except at Gate; Coast Club Drawing Poorly but Autry Is Optimistic", The New York Times, May 14, 1961. p. S2
- Becker, Bill, "U.S. A-bomb Test for Peaceful Use Frees Radiation; Vapor Cloud Escapes Cave in New Mexico Blast—A.E.C. Doubts Danger", The New York Times, December 11, 1961. p. 1
- Becker, Bill, "Stagg Gets a Nationwide Salute; President Is Among Well-Wishers for a Happy Birthday Grand Old Man of Football, Now 100, Still Speaks Out", The New York Times, August 17, 1962. p. 15
- Becker, Bill, "Cuba Quarantine Is Urged By Nixon; He Proposes Kennedy Take 'Stronger Action' at Once", The New York Times, September 19, 1962. p. 1
- Becker, Bill, "Hoffa Testifies in Los Angeles; Barely Misses Robert Kennedy", The New York Times, February 14, 1963. p. 4
- Becker, Bill, "Negroes on Coast March at Project; Say Developer Refuses to Sell Homes to Nonwhites", The New York Times, June 30, 1963. p. 46
- Becker, Bill, "O. J. Simpson Goes From Goat to Hero With 9-Yard Run", The New York Times, October 20, 1968. p. S4
