= Diane M. Becker =

American nurse and public health scientist (1943–2021)

- Born: Diane M. Demarest; March 27, 1943; Warwick, New York, U.S.
- Died: February 17, 2021 (aged 77); Baltimore, Maryland, U.S.
- Education: Johns Hopkins University
- Spouse: Lewis C. Becker (m. 1964)
- Children: 1
- Scientific career
- Fields: Public health, cardiovascular disease prevention
- Workplaces: Johns Hopkins University
- Doctoral advisor: David M. Levine

Diane M. Becker (née Demarest; March 27, 1943 – November 17, 2021) was an American nurse and public health scientist who researched cardiovascular disease prevention. She was a professor of medicine at the Johns Hopkins School of Medicine.

== Career and education ==
Becker graduated from Monroe-Woodbury High School in 1961. Becker graduated from the Johns Hopkins School of Nursing in 1964 with a R.N. Diploma in Nursing.

For 17 years, Becker worked as a nursing director in intensive care units in London, Boston, and Chapel Hill, North Carolina. She earned a B.S. (1978), M.P.H. (1979), and Sc.D. (1984) in health policy and management from the Johns Hopkins Bloomberg School of Public Health. Her doctoral advisor was David M. Levine. Becker's dissertation was titled Risk Behaviors and Risk Factors in Siblings of People with Early Coronary Heart Disease.

Levine recruited Becker in 1984, Becker to join the faculty of Johns Hopkins School of Medicine. She researched cardiovascular disease prevention and specialized in coronary disease risk factors. In 1987, Becker became the first nurse to receive an academic appointment in the Johns Hopkins School of Medicine. She worked in the department of medicine division of general internal medicine and held a joint appointment in the Bloomberg School department of health policy and management.

Becker partnered with pastors from 250 churches in East Baltimore to create the nonprofit Heart, Body, and Soul, Inc. aimed at improving health outcomes among urban African American populations. In 1995, Becker became a Robert Wood Johnson Fellow. Becker retired in 2018 and was named a professor emerita of medicine.

== Personal life ==
Becker was born March 27, 1943, in Warwick, New York, to Lucile Swartwout, a nurse, and John Smith Demarest a bar and inn manager in Greenwood Lake, New York. She met Lewis C. Becker, her future husband, while she was a nursing student and he was studying medicine. They married on November 7, 1964. They had a daughter. Becker and her husband were seasonal residents of Martha's Vineyard, having bought a home in Lambert's Cove in 1990.

Becker died November 17, 2021, of metastatic breast cancer in North Roland Park, Baltimore. An Anglican funeral mass was held at St. Thomas the Apostle Hollywood.
