= Dorothea Becker =

German suspected witch (c.1536–1609)

Dorothea Becker (c. 1536 – 1 May 1609) was a German woman who was twice accused of witchcraft during her lifetime. She was nicknamed "The Witch of Bilstein". She was found innocent both times.
