= Alexandra Becker =

German politician (born 1995)

Member of the Landtag of Saarland
- Incumbent
- Assumed office 25 April 2022

Personal details
- Born: 11 February 1995 (age 31)
- Party: Social Democratic Party (since 2019)

Alexandra Becker (born 11 February 1995) is a German politician serving as a member of the Landtag of Saarland since 2022. She has served as deputy chairwoman of Jusos in Saarbrücken-Land since 2021.
