= Mathias Becker =

Luxembourgish footballer (1907–1952)

Personal information
- Date of birth: 4 February 1907
- Date of death: 23 January 1952 (aged 44)

International career
Years	Team	Apps	(Gls)
1927-1937	Luxembourg	24	(6)

Mathias Becker (4 February 1907 – 23 January 1952) was a Luxembourgish footballer. He played in twenty-four matches for the Luxembourg national football team between 1927 and 1937.
