= Sven Becker =

German gynaecologist and academic (born 1968)

Sven Becker

Sven Becker (born 14 February 1968 in Wiesbaden) is a German gynaecologist and university professor. Since July 2012, he has been director of the Department of Gynaecology and Obstetrics at University Medicine Frankfurt.

== Life and career ==
Becker attended Brophy College Preparatory in Phoenix, Arizona, during the 1984–85 school year, where he obtained a US high-school diploma. In 1987, he completed his Abitur at the Gymnasium am Moltkering in Wiesbaden.

From 1987 to 1994, Becker studied medicine at Johannes Gutenberg University Mainz. During his studies, he spent two semesters at Université René Descartes in Paris from 1989 to 1990, one semester at the Autonomous University of Madrid in 1991, and two semesters at Nihon University in Tokyo from 1992 to 1993. In 1994, he completed the German Third Medical State Examination as well as USMLE Step 1 and Step 2.

From 1992 to 1995, Becker carried out doctoral research at the Institute of Physiological Chemistry at Johannes Gutenberg University Mainz under Werner E. G. Müller. His dissertation, In-vitro Erprobung potentiell antiviraler Substanzen gegen HIV im MTT-Test, was graded magna cum laude. He was awarded the degree of Dr. med. in 1999.

In 2006, he completed his habilitation at the University of Tübingen under Diethelm Wallwiener. His habilitation thesis, Tumorzelldissemination und Tumorzellpersistenz beim Mammakarzinom – Einfluss der systemischen Therapie und Charakteristika der disseminierten Zellen, examined tumour-cell dissemination and persistence in breast cancer.

Becker began his clinical career in 1995 at the Department of Gynaecology of St. Joseph's Hospital in Wiesbaden, an academic teaching hospital of the University of Frankfurt. From 1996 to 1997, he worked at the Institute of Pathology at Klinikum rechts der Isar of the Technical University of Munich.

From 1997 to 2001, Becker completed residency training in obstetrics and gynaecology at Johns Hopkins University and Johns Hopkins Hospital in Baltimore. According to University Medicine Frankfurt, he completed the US specialist examination in gynaecology and obstetrics in June 2001. He subsequently joined the University Women's Hospital in Tübingen, where he obtained German specialist certification in obstetrics and gynaecology in July 2002.

From 2002 to 2004, Becker headed the clinical obstetrics and delivery-unit section at the University Women's Hospital in Tübingen. In May 2004, he became a consultant surgeon and head of operative gynaecology; in May 2007, he became senior consultant for gynaecology, and in August 2009 he was appointed Leitender Oberarzt. He obtained additional qualifications in special obstetrics and perinatal medicine in 2003, operative gynaecology and gynaecological oncology in 2006, and palliative medicine in 2010. In June 2010, the University of Tübingen awarded him the title of außerplanmäßiger Professor.

On 1 April 2012, Becker was appointed to a W3 professorship in obstetrics and gynaecology at the University of Lübeck. During his time in Lübeck he headed the Department of Gynaecology and Obstetrics at the Lübeck campus of University Hospital Schleswig-Holstein.

Since 1 July 2012, Becker has been director of the Department of Gynaecology and Obstetrics at University Medicine Frankfurt.

According to a congress biography published by the Society for Gynaecological Minimally Invasive Surgery, Becker was offered a professorship and a chair position in gynaecological oncology at the universities of Rotterdam and Leiden in 2017, but chose to remain in Frankfurt. The same source states that he served on the board of directors of the Frankfurt Comprehensive Cancer Center.

In 2020, Becker was elected to the Executive Board of the European Society for Gynaecological Endoscopy (ESGE). In 2023, he was identified as a member of the Board of Directors of the American Association of Gynecologic Laparoscopists at a joint AGES/AAGL scientific meeting.

In 2024, Becker was part of a research team led by Klaus Strebhardt whose mRNA-based ovarian-cancer project received second place in the 2024 Goethe Innovation Prize.

Becker is married and has two children.

== Research and clinical work ==
Becker's clinical work focuses on operative gynaecology, gynaecological oncology and minimally invasive surgery. He heads the Gynaecological Cancer Centre at University Medicine Frankfurt and serves as spokesperson for the gynaecological oncology programme at the University Cancer Center Frankfurt.

The Gynaecological Cancer Centre treats ovarian cancer, cervical cancer, endometrial cancer, vulvar cancer, vaginal cancer, uterine sarcomas and other rare gynaecological tumours. Its services include minimally invasive surgery, molecular pathological diagnostics and counselling for patients seeking fertility preservation in the context of cancer treatment.

Research areas associated with the gynaecological oncology programme include innovative surgical procedures and new treatment strategies. Becker's scientific work has included research on disseminated tumour cells and their persistence following systemic treatment in breast cancer.

He has also co-authored research on molecular mechanisms in the ovarian-cancer tumour microenvironment.

Becker's research group also contributed patient-derived tumour cells to a project investigating an mRNA-based approach to restoring the function of the tumour suppressor p53 in high-grade serous ovarian cancer.

Becker has appeared as a speaker and live-surgery operator at international scientific meetings. A 2023 congress biography states that he had lectured in more than 20 countries and performed live surgery at meetings in Europe, the United States, Africa and Asia.

== Publications ==
Together with Diethelm Wallwiener, Becker is an author of the fourth edition of the English-language Atlas of Gynecologic Surgery, published by Thieme in 2013.

Becker is also an author and co-author of scientific publications in gynaecological oncology and tumour biology.

== Memberships ==
Professional societies listed by University Medicine Frankfurt include:

- German Society for Gynaecology and Obstetrics (DGGG)
- German Cancer Society (DKG)
- American College of Obstetricians and Gynecologists (ACOG)
- Arbeitsgemeinschaft Gynäkologische Onkologie (AGO)
- Arbeitsgemeinschaft Gynäkologische Endoskopie (AGE)
- German Society for Perinatal Medicine (DGPM)
- German Society for Ultrasound in Medicine (DEGUM)
- European Society of Gynaecological Oncology (ESGO)
