= Isabelle Becker =

French singer (1964–2024)

- Born: 1965
- Died: 7 May 2024 (aged 59)
- Occupation: Singer

Isabelle Becker (1965 – 7 May 2024) was a French singer. She was a co-founder of the band Edgar de l'Est, of which she was a member from 1992 to 2003 and released three albums with: La Berlue, Ces jours-ci, and Les Vacances. She then formed the group "Wandarine" with her husband, composer Bruno Coq. In 2004, they released Poke-Rope, which contained songs in French and in English. In 2016, former Straw Dawgs drummer Eric Hello joined Wanderine. Becker died on 7 May 2024, at the age of 59.

== Discography ==
=== With Edgar de l'Est ===
- La Berlue (1995)
- Ces jours-ci (1999)
- Les vacances (2002)
- Retrouvailles (2008)

=== With Wandarine ===
- Poke-Rope (2004)

=== Features ===
- "Marlène" by Noir Désir (1992)
- "La latitude des chevaux" by Frédéric Vidalenc (2002)
