= Thorsten Becker =

German footballer (born 1980)

Personal information
- Date of birth: 13 May 1980 (age 46)
- Height: 1.84 m (6 ft 1/2 in)
- Position: Defender

Team information
- Current team: Hövelhofer SV

Youth career
- –1992: Fortuna Schlangen
- 1992–2001: SC Paderborn 07

Senior career*
Years	Team	Apps	(Gls)
2001–2009	SC Paderborn 07	79	(2)
2009–2010	Hövelhofer SV		
- * Club domestic league appearances and goals as of 31 January 2010

Thorsten Becker (born 13 May 1980) is a German footballer, who in 1992 moved from Fortuna Schlangen to SC Paderborn and has played in the club's first-team squad from 2001 to 2009. He helped Paderborn gain promotion to the second level of the Bundesliga in the 2004–05 season. He suffered a knee injury in late 2005 which resulted in a long-term absence from the club.

After he retired from playing football, Becker became a coach and joined Paderborn's under-19 team as co-manager in June 2016.
