= Klaus Becker =

German steel entrepreneur (born 1953)

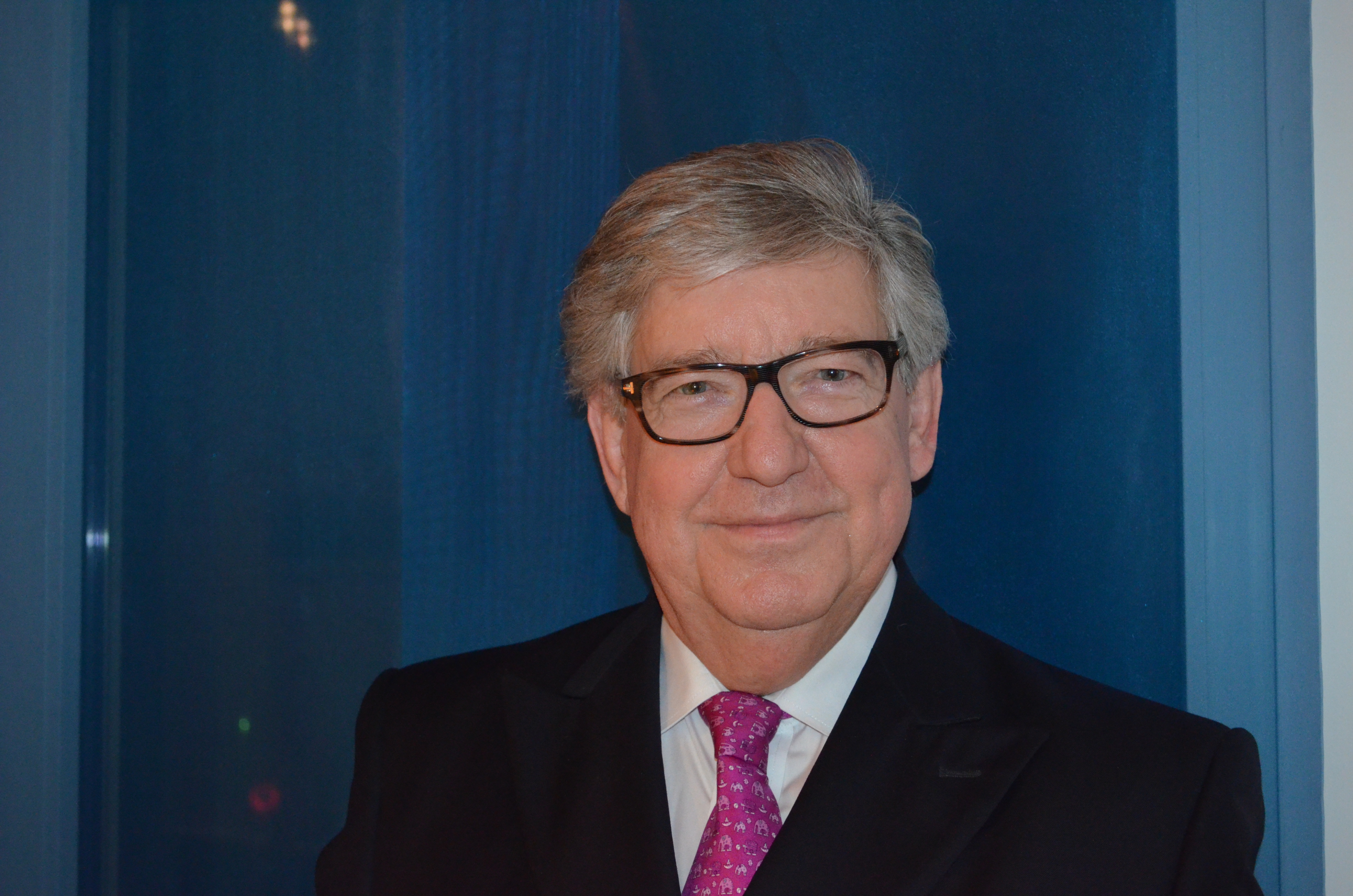
- Born: February 4, 1953 (age 73); Marburg, Germany
- Spouse: Concha Becker
- Awards: Global Service Award, Rotary International, Charlotte City Club, The Global Leader Award, Entrepreneurial Trailblazer Award, Entrepreneur of the Year in North Carolina (Ernest + Young)

Klaus Becker (born February 4, 1953, in Marburg, Germany) is a German/American businessman, working in the steel industry.

== Early life and education ==
Klaus Becker was born in Marburg, Germany in 1953 and grew up in Dortmund, where his father worked as a technician in a steel production company. He graduated from an apprenticeship program as merchant of foreign trade. Traineeships took him to Italy, Brazil, and the US. Later, he studied business administration and national economics and received a master’s degree from the Ruhr-Universität in Bochum.

== Career ==
Since 1979, Becker has lived in Charlotte, North Carolina, working in the international steel trade. In 1991, Becker founded SouthStar Steel Cooperation which became the largest importer of stainless-steel bars in the US within five years. It was the fastest growing privately held company in the Southern Piedmont three years in a row, and was 21st in Inc. Magazine's "The Inner City 100". With warehouses in Charlotte, Philadelphia, Milwaukee, Los Angeles, and Houston, the company created new supply lines and distributed stainless steel bars from Spanish, Korean, Brazilian and Italian manufacturers.

Currently, Becker owns Nirosteel LLC, an international steel trading company based in Charlotte. Nirosteel imports steel and steel related products into the US, Mexico and several European countries.

== Awards ==
Becker was voted Entrepreneur of the Year by Ernst & Young in North Carolina in 1996, and by the Charlotte Chamber of Commerce in 1998. Additionally, he has served as president of the N.C. Chapter of the German-American Chamber of Commerce for seven years, from 2004 to 2011.

== Personal life ==
Klaus Becker has been married to Concha Becker since 1983. They have a daughter, Fiorella.

== Honorary consul ==
In 2013, Klaus Becker was appointed as honorary consul of the Federal Republic of Germany for North Carolina. In this function, he founded the N.C. Zeitgeist Foundation. The goal of the Foundation is to inform about German culture, industry, politics, as well as history. The foundation has promoted Charlotte as a US location for international business, trade, and investment, and Becker continues to engage German and American businesses. He was instrumental in bringing the soccer clubs FC Bayern Munich and Borussia Dortmund to Charlotte to play against foreign teams in the International Champions Cup tournament in 2016.
