= Léon Becker =

Belgian painter (1826–1909)

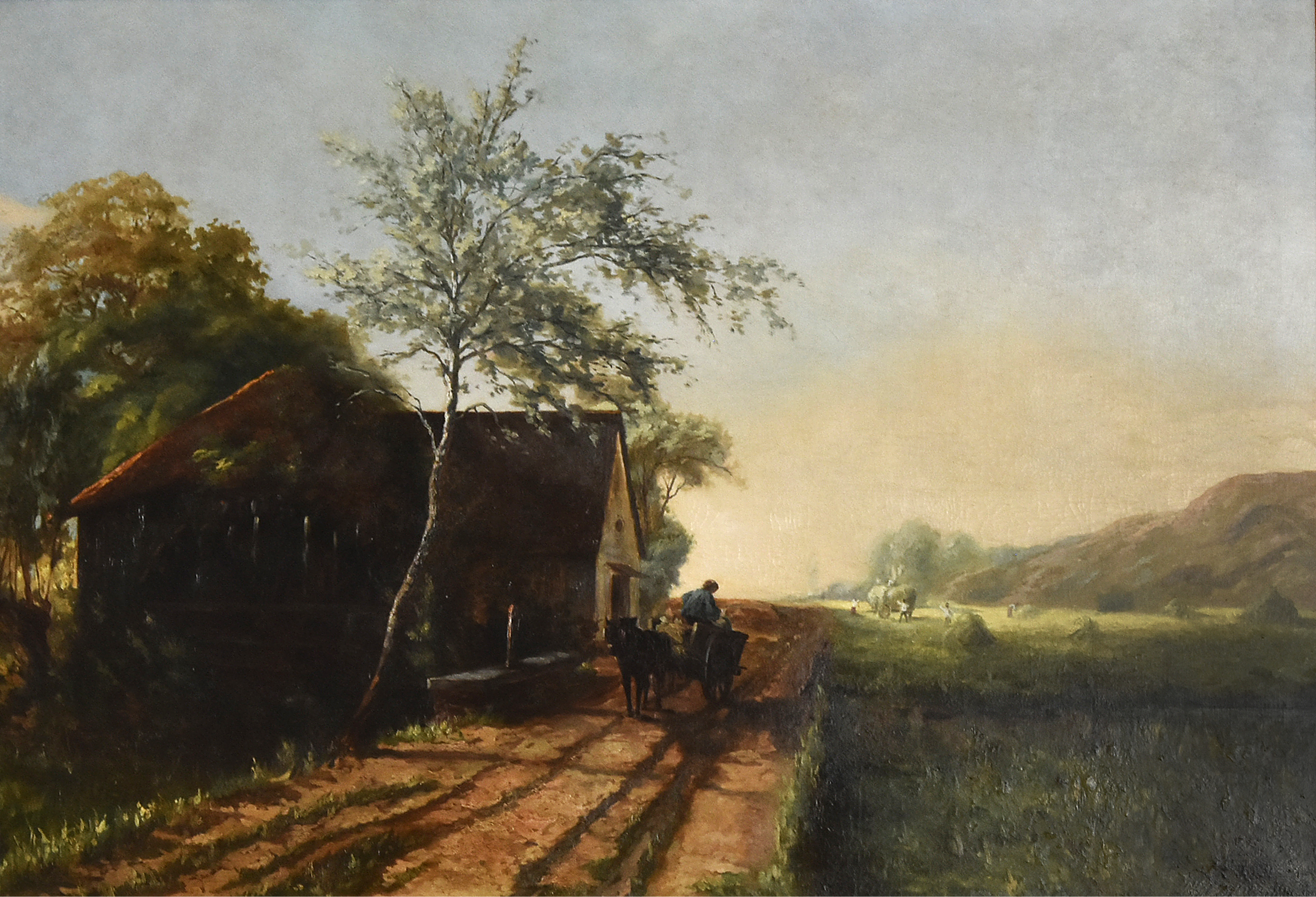
- Molen in Genck (Emile Van Doren museum).
- Born: 1826; Brussels, Belgium
- Died: 27 January 1909 (aged 82–83); Brussels, Belgium
- Notable work: Les Arachnides de Belgique

Signature
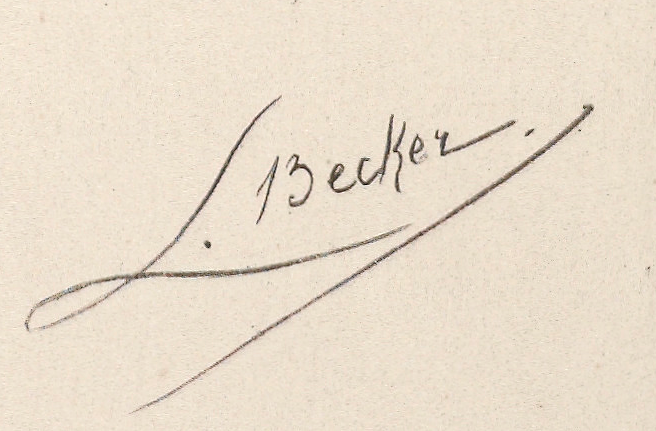

Léon Becker (1826 – 27 January 1909) was a Belgian botanist, painter, naturalist, and arachnologist.

== Biography ==
From a young age, he became passionate about entomology, with a particular interest in arachnology. He is the author of the first studies on Belgian spiders. Between 1882 and 1896, he published four volumes entitled Les Arachnides de Belgique, which he illustrated himself. His lithographs are of very high quality.

He also studied Dutch, German, Moldavian, and Hungarian fauna.

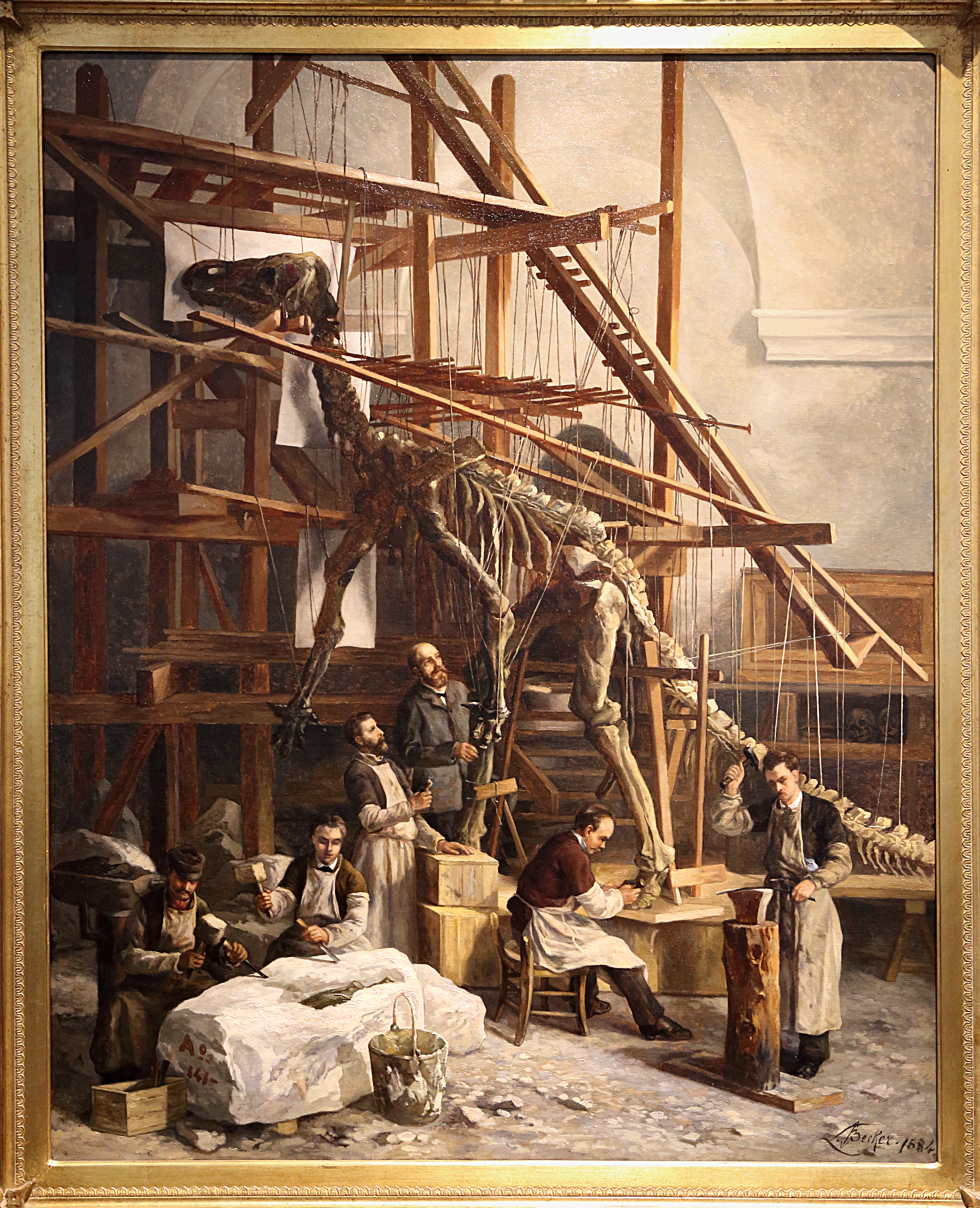
Painting by Léon Becker (1884), exhibited at the Royal Belgian Institute of Natural Sciences in Brussels, representing the mounting of the first iguanodon of Bernissart in the St. George Chapel in Brussels in 1882.
