= Bob Becker (music executive) =

American music executive and musician (born c.1963)

- Born: California, United States
- Occupation: Music executive
- Organization(s): Thriller Records, Fearless Records (former)

Bob Becker (born c. 1963) is an American music executive and musician, best known as the founder of the independent record labels Fearless Records and Thriller Records. Becker has been credited with discovering and developing several prominent acts in the alternative, pop-punk, and post-hardcore genres, including At the Drive-In, Plain White T's, Portugal, Mayday Parade, Motionless in White, The Home Team and Pierce the Veil.

== Career ==
=== Early life and career beginnings ===
Bob Becker was raised in Southern California and grew up during the first wave of American punk rock, which influenced his later career in the music industry. Prior to becoming a record executive, Becker was an active participant in the Orange County music scene as a musician. He served as the original frontman and vocalist for the surf-punk band White Kaps. He would go on to form his first record label, Fearless Records, out of a need to release their 7-inch single.

In the early 1990s, Becker began assisting local bands, many of which were composed of his personal friends, with the distribution of their music. Starting around 1992, he operated a makeshift distribution network, selling 7-inch vinyl records and demo tapes out of the trunk of his car at punk shows across Orange County.

=== Fearless Records ===
Becker founded Fearless Records in 1994 in Westminster, California. The label's name was inspired by Becker's "fearless" approach to entering the music industry despite a lack of formal experience, a philosophy he described as "jumping in head first." The label became a staple of the 2000s alternative scene, particularly through its Punk Goes... compilation series and the commercial success of artists like Breathe Carolina and The Plain White T's, the latter of whom achieved a multi-platinum hit with "Hey There Delilah." In 2015, Becker sold Fearless Records with a back-catalog of about 150 albums for an estimated $10,000,000 to Concord Music Group. Following the sale, he transitioned into the role of Chairman Emeritus, maintaining an advisory relationship with the label for several years.

=== Thriller Records ===
In June 2021, Becker returned to label management by launching Thriller Records in partnership with Nick Moore, the founder of InVogue Records. Becker cited a desire to return to the day-to-day excitement of artist development and a need to adapt to the evolving digital music landscape as the primary motivations for the new venture. Thriller Records has since signed acts such as AVOID and The Word Alive, and in 2022, the label officially acquired the InVogue Records catalog and brand.

== See also ==
- Fearless Records
- Thriller Records
- Punk Goes...
