= Bo Becker =

Swedish economist and academic (born 1971)

Bo Becker (born 1971) is a Swedish economist, and Professor of Financial Economics at the Stockholm School of Economics, known for his work on rating, reputation and competition.

== Life and work ==
Becker obtained his MSc in economics from the Stockholm School of Economics in 1995, and his PhD in finance at the University of Chicago in 2005 with the thesis, entitled "Geographical Segmentation of US Capital Markets," under Luigi Zingales.

In 2004 Becker started his academic career as research assistant at the University of Illinois at Urbana–Champaign. In 2009 he moved to the Harvard Business School, where he was appointed assistant professor of Business Administration. In 2013 back in Sweden he was appointed Professor of Financial Economics at the Stockholm School of Economics. In 2020, Becker was appointed to a newly established Chair in Finance at the Stockholm School of Economics, funded by Cevian Capital. On 1 July 2022, he became Director of the Swedish House of Finance and Head of SSE's Department of Finance. He was succeeded as director by Paolo Sodini in 2026.

== Selected publications ==
- Becker, Bo, and Todd Milbourn.Reputation and competition: evidence from the credit rating industry. Harvard Business School, 2008.

Articles, a selection:

- Becker, Bo. "Wealth and executive compensation." The Journal of Finance 61.1 (2006): 379–397.
- Becker, Bo, and Todd Milbourn. "How did increased competition affect credit ratings?." Journal of Financial Economics 101.3 (2011): 493–514.
