= Karl Becker (statistician) =

German statistician (1823–1896)

Karl Becker (2 October 1823 – 20 June 1896) was a German statistician.

== Biography ==
Becker was born in Strohausen, Rodenkirchen in what is now Stadland. In 1842, he received a commission in the army, and was also an instructor in the Oldenburg Military Academy. He fought in the First Schleswig War against Denmark, and rose to be a captain. In 1855, he organized the statistical bureau of Oldenburg, of which he was director until 1872. He edited Statistische Nachrichten über das Grossherzogthum Oldenburg (Statistical reports for the Grand Duchy of Oldenburg; 1857–72). He then became director of the statistical office of the German Empire, where he remained until his death in Berlin. In this capacity, he edited the Monatsheft zur Statistik des Deutschen Reichs (Statistical Monthly for the German Empire) and the Statistischen Jahrbuches (Statistical Yearbook). His writings include Zur Berechnung von Sterbetafeln an die Bevölkerungstatistik zu stellende Anforderungen (1874).
