= Carl K. Becker =

American doctor and missionary (1894–1990)

- Born: 1894; Manheim, Pennsylvania, US
- Died: 1990 (aged 95–96)

Carl K. Becker (1894–1990) was an American doctor and missionary. He left a profitable medical practice in Boyertown, Pennsylvania to join the Africa Inland Mission in 1929. By 1934 he had set up his own mission station in the Ituri Rainforest in the Belgian Congo. Becker was medical resident of the mission's hospital, carried out more than 3,000 operations and delivered hundreds of babies each year. He was the first in Equatorial Africa to use electric shock therapy for the treatment of psychiatric disorders and his leprosy village attracted specialists from across the world. He was briefly evacuated during the 1964 Simba rebellion and returned to the United States upon his retirement in 1976.

== Biography ==
Carl K. Becker was born in Manheim, Pennsylvania, in 1894. His family were Christian and occasionally suffered from poverty. Becker studied at Hahnemann Medical College in Philadelphia and after being awarded his degree established a medical practice in Boyertown.

Although Becker's medical practice was flourishing, he volunteered to serve as a missionary for the Africa Inland Mission in 1929. He and his wife, Marie, left for Africa later that year and in 1934 set up their own mission station among the pgymy peoples of the Ituri Rainforest, Belgian Congo. He served as the only medical resident of the Oicha hospital and performed in excess of 3,000 operations there. Becker delivered hundreds of babies each year and was the first doctor in Equatorial Africa to successfully use electric shock therapy for the treatment of psychiatric disorders. Becker specialised in the treatment of leprosy and specialists visited from around the world to study his research and observe his 1,100-acre (450 ha) leprosy village that treated 4,000 patients. He continued to respond to emergency medical call-outs up to the age of 70.

Becker was also an evangelist preacher and used crudely drawn scenes to teach bible stories in the local villages. He was evacuated from Oicha in 1964 during the Simba rebellion but returned the next year to rebuild his mission, which had been badly damaged by guerilla fighters. A biography of Becker was written in 1967 and the American writer Art Buchwald compared him to the great humanitarian Albert Schweitzer and said that Becker had made the greatest impression on him of any man he met in Africa, while one of his African medical trainees said that "Many missionaries had preached Jesus Christ to me, but in the munganga [doctor] I have seen Jesus Christ." Becker retired in 1976 and moved back to the United States with his wife. He died in 1990.
