= Reinhold Becker =

German swimmer (born 1959)

Personal information
- Nationality: German
- Born: 23 May 1959 (age 67) Troisdorf, West Germany

Sport
- Sport: Swimming

Reinhold Becker (born 23 May 1959) is a German former swimmer. He competed in two events at the 1976 Summer Olympics.
