= Sebastian Becker =

German footballer (born 1985)

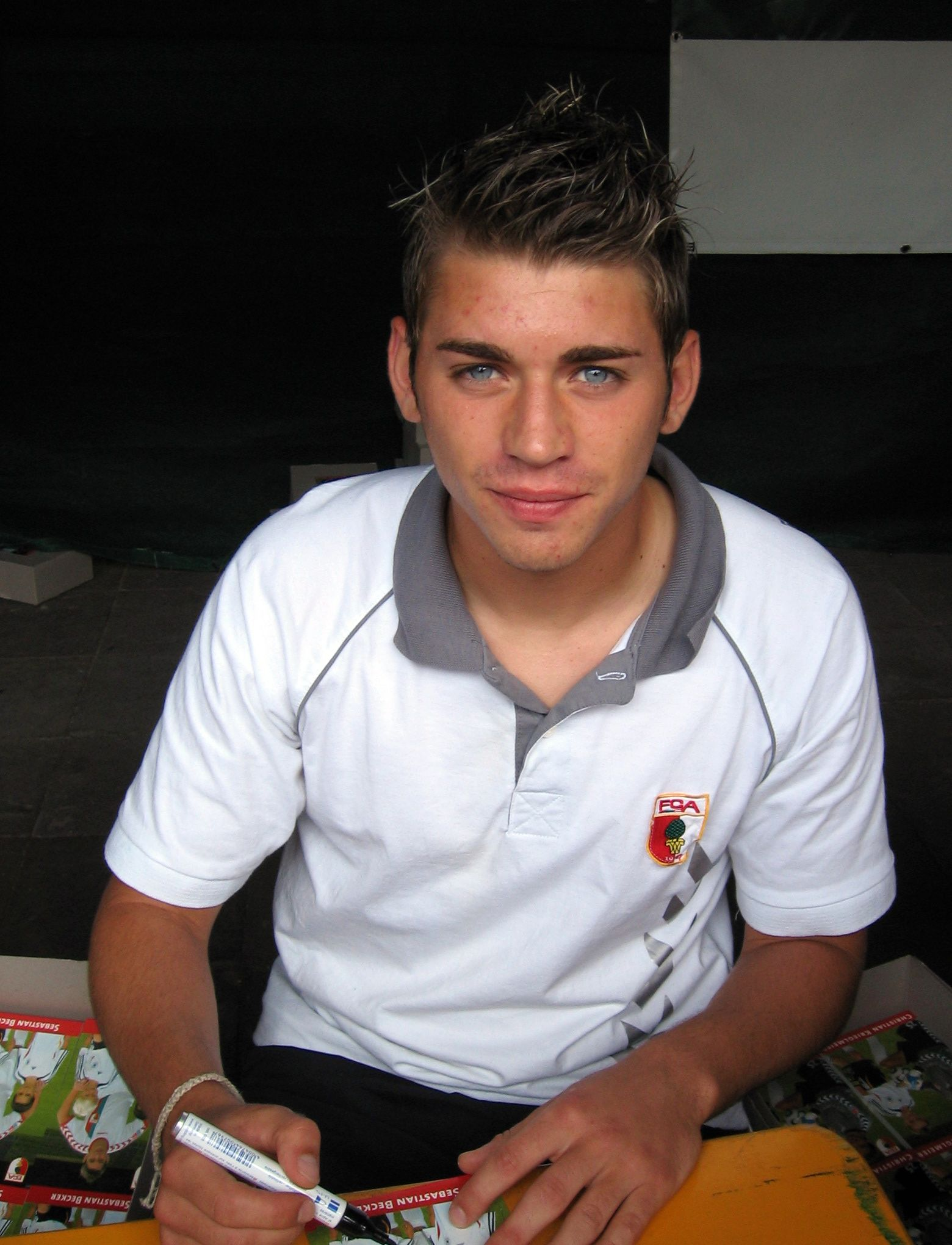
- Becker in 2006

Personal information
- Full name: Sebastian Becker
- Date of birth: 10 April 1985 (age 41)
- Place of birth: Trier, West Germany
- Height: 1.79 m (5 ft 10 in)
- Position: Midfielder

Youth career
- –1997: TSC Pfalzel
- 1997–2004: Eintracht Trier

Senior career*
Years	Team	Apps	(Gls)
2004–2006	Eintracht Trier	34	(4)
2006	Eintracht Trier II	1	(1)
2006–2008	FC Augsburg	20	(0)
2007–2008	FC Augsburg II	6	(0)
2008–2009	Kickers Offenbach	24	(0)
2008–2009	Kickers Offenbach II	4	(2)
2009–2011	Rot-Weiß Erfurt	10	(0)
Total		99	(7)
- * Club domestic league appearances and goals

Sebastian Becker (born 10 April 1985) is a German former footballer who played as a midfielder.

== Career ==
Becker made his professional debut for Eintracht Trier in the 2. Bundesliga on 12 March 2004, coming on as a substitute in the 85th minute for Matthias Keller in the 4–0 home win against Jahn Regensburg.
