= Ludwig Hugo Becker =

German painter and etcher (1833–1868)

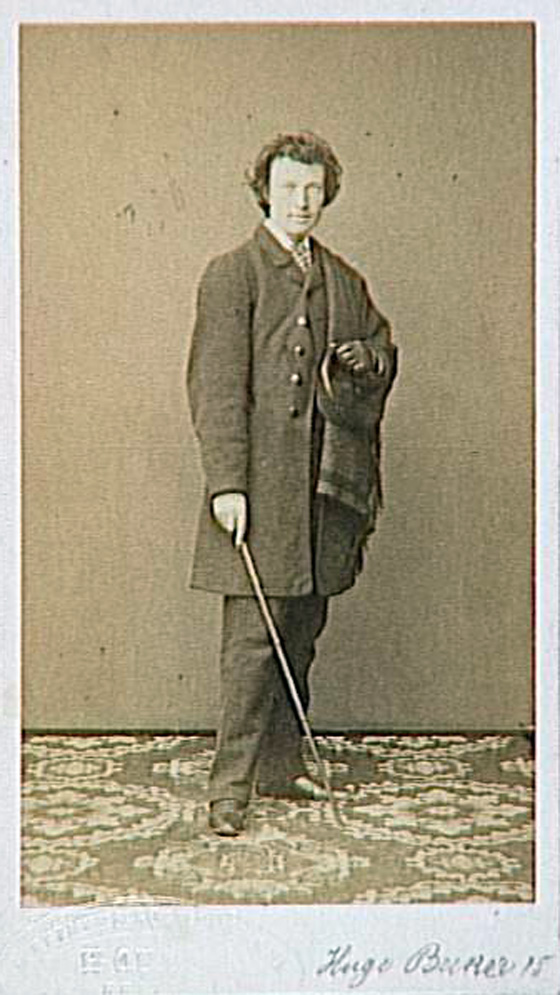
Ludwig Hugo Becker (date unknown)

Ludwig Hugo Becker (19 July 1833 – 25 December 1868) was a German painter and etcher. Becker was born at Wesel and studied landscape painting under Schirmer and Gude, at Düsseldorf, about 1852. He afterwards visited Westphalia, the Upper Rhine, the Moselle, Switzerland, Normandy, and the neighbourhood of the Baltic. In 1861 he was awarded a medal at Metz. He died at Düsseldorf in 1868. Among his landscapes the most important are:

- The Sacrifice of the Old Germans (in possession of Gl. v. Gröben).
- The Passing Storm.
- Sunday Morning.
- The Shepherd on the Pasture.
- Christmas Eve.
- The Vine-crop on the Moselle.

== See also ==
- List of German painters
