= Niels Becker =

Australian rules footballer and biologist (born 1942)

Personal information
- Full name: Niels Gunther Becker
- Born: 16 June 1942; Döbern, Province of Brandenburg, Nazi Germany
- Original team: Braybrook
- Height: 189 cm (6 ft 2 in)
- Weight: 80 kg (176 lb)
- Position: Ruck

Playing career^{1}
| Years | Club | Games (Goals) |
| 1962–63 | Footscray | 10 (3) |
- ^{1} Playing statistics correct to the end of 1963.

Niels Gunther Becker (born 16 June 1942) is a former Australian rules footballer who played with Footscray in the Victorian Football League (VFL). He later went on to become a professor at the Australian National University, distinguishing himself in the fields of biostatistics, epidemiology and public health.
