= Alexander K. Becker =

German botanist and entomologist (1818–1901)

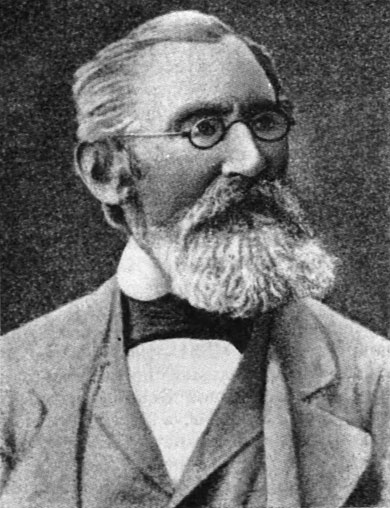
Alexander K. Becker

Alexander K. Becker (c. 1818–1901) was a German botanist and entomologist.

In 1871, Becker conducted a study trip along the Volga, collecting and describing many endemic species of the Flora of Russia.

Plant specimens collected by Becker are sold by Rudolph Friedrich Hohenacker as part of the exsiccata-like series A. Becker pl. Wolga infer. Ed. R. F. Hohenacker.
