= William Beckner =

William Beckner may refer to:

- William M. Beckner (1841–1910), US representative
- William Beckner (mathematician) (born 1941), American mathematician
