= Eric M. B. Becker =

American writer and translator

Eric M. B. Becker is an American writer, editor, and translator of literary works from the Portuguese language.

Becker currently serves as Digital Director & Senior Editor of the literary journal Words without Borders. In 2014, he received PEN/Heim Translation Fund Grant for his translations of Mia Couto, and in 2016, he received a Fulbright Fellowship to translate Brazilian literature. In 2018, he was awarded a fellowship from the National Endowment of the Arts for his translation for the short stories of canonical Brazilian writer Lygia Fagundes Telles, a contemporary of Clarice Lispector and Hilda Hilst. In 2019, he was selected for the Frankfurt Book Fair Fellowship Programme for editors.

In 2016, Becker edited—with Mirna Queiroz dos Santos—an anthology of Brazilian women writers for PEN America, which included a preface by American writer Claire Messud.

Becker has given interviews on the subject of literary translation and been profiled for newspapers and television around the world. He has also given workshops on the translation of Portuguese language literature in Brazil and elsewhere. He has also served on the jury for the National Translation Award.
