= Mariana Becker =

Brazilian sports journalist and television reporter (born 1971)

- Born: 30 April 1971 (age 55); Porto Alegre, Brazil
- Occupations: Sports journalist; Television reporter
- Years active: 1995–present
- Employer: Rede Bandeirantes

Mariana Gertum Becker (born 1971) is a Brazilian sports journalist and television reporter for Rede Bandeirantes. Since being employed by Rede Globo in 1995, she has covered association football, extreme sports, water sports, the World Surf League, Formula One motor racing, the Rally dos Sertões, and the 2016 Summer Olympics in Rio de Janeiro over the course of her career. In 2021, she left Rede Globo and signed with Rede Bandeirantes.

== Biography ==
Becker was born in 1971 in Porto Alegre, Rio Grande do Sul. She is the daughter of a gynecologist and an English literature graduate, and is one of five children in her family. All five children were given equal treatment from their father. After doing ballet, Becker began attending Brazilian surfing championships from age 15, doing radio bulletins on the sport for Ipanema FM. She was around the age of 17 when she began writing articles on women she found to be interesting. In 1989, Becker enrolled at the Faculty of Social Communications of the Pontifical Catholic University of Rio Grande do Sul. Becker studied Sociology for half a year and attended radio journalism and semiotic classes. She wrote an article about surfer champion Andrea Lopes, which was published in the Folha de S.Paulo newspaper. In 1994, Becker graduated from the university due to her remaining for one more semester to complete the Course Completion Work on invasion of privacy and breakable and unbreakable barriers for journalists. During the course, she worked at Jornal Vertical, Ipanema FM and interned at the newspaper Zero Hora.

Becker was noticed by Rede Globo's editor-in-chief Telmo Zanini at work contacted her and told her to travel to Rio de Janeiro for an test. In 1995, she took up employment with the television network as a reporter at a time when women were scarce in the sport newsroom departments of Brazil in an environment populated 95 per cent of the time by men. She found the environment to be unwelcoming, but went on to cover association football, extreme sports and water sports for Rede Globo as well as the World Surf League in the islands of Hawaii and Tahiti in 2003 and 2004. Becker became acquainted with people from the world of motorsport, and in 2007, began to cover Formula One motor racing for Rede Globo as a presenter. She also reported at the Rally dos Sertões in 2009, which broadened her knowledge of motor racing. Becker was a reporter at the 2016 Summer Olympics in Rio de Janeiro. She was also called out to breaking news stories by Rede Globo when required. Following the postponement of the 2020 Formula One World Championship by motorsport's world governing body, the Fédération Internationale de l'Automobile, for three months due to the COVID-19 pandemic, she travelled to the five of the season's rounds by car and not by air travel to avoid spending a plethora of time indoors.

Following the end of Rede Globo's coverage of Formula One, Becker left the network in December 2020. She joined Rede Bandeirantes from the 2021 Formula One World Championship, having an expanded role with behind-the-scenes look at the paddock and broadcasting how the mechanics and drivers prepare for each Grand Prix. When the Brazilian broadcasting rights for Formula One reverted back to TV Globo for the 2025 season, Becker did not return to the network and is set to be replaced by Júlia Guimarães.

== Personal life ==
She lives in Monaco .Becker is fluent in four languages, something she demonstrated during Rede Globo's broadcast of the 2020 Tuscan Grand Prix, likes animals, and prefers to eat healthy foods. She says she wakes up early in order to venture to the race circuit as preparation for the network's broadcast of a Grand Prix and continues to work in the immediate area until late at night.
