= Kurt H. Becker =

American physicist and entrepreneur

- Education: Universitaet des Saarland
- Occupations: University Administrator, Physicist
- Organization: New York University Polytechnic School of Engineering

Kurt H. Becker is an American physicist and entrepreneur. His research focuses on experimental atomic, chemical, and plasma physics. He is vice dean of research, innovation, and entrepreneurship at New York University Polytechnic School of Engineering. Becker holds seven patents regarding the generation and maintenance of atmospheric-pressure plasmas and their application.

== Career ==
In 1984, Becker began working at Lehigh University. He was head of the physics and engineering physics department, as well as associate director of the center for environmental systems at Stevens Institute of Technology. In 2001, he received the Thomas Alva Edison Patent Award from the Research and Development Council of New Jersey. Becker joined New York University Polytechnic School of Engineering in March 2007 when he was appointed associate provost for research and technology initiatives and dean of sciences and arts. Becker oversees the NYU Incubator programs which support startup companies, including ACRE, the NYC clean-tech incubator, and NYU's first incubator at Varick St. in lower Manhattan.

In July 2009, Becker was appointed the third editor-in-chief of The European Physical Journal D: Atomic, Molecular, Optical and Plasma Physics to work with Franco Gianturco and Claude Fabre. His focus at the journal was low-temperature plasma physics. Becker is a consultant for Ionicon Analytik, a gas analysis instrument company in Austria. He is also a fellow of the American Physical Society and the National Academy of Inventors. Becker has also received the SASP Erwin Scroedinger Medal of the University of Innsbruck.

== Research ==
Becker focuses on the experimental and theoretical study of electron-driven processes in plasmas. Becker was part of a group of scientists leading the research on the determination of ionization cross sections of atoms and molecules. Their research worked toward the understanding of the charge carrier formation in plasmas. Becker also researches the properties of basic atmospheric-pressure microplasmas and their use in environmental, biological, and biomedical applications. His research showed that unstable plasmas, which can be guided with a vacuum, become more stable when confined to less than 1mm, allowing for the manipulation of chemicals within. This research resulted in 7 patents and formed the basis of 2 startup companies, PlasmaSol and Plasmion. PlasmaSol was sold to Stryker Instruments for $18,000,000 in 2005.

== Selected bibliography ==
- R. Wang, S. Zuo, D. Wu, J. Zhang, W. Zhu, K. Becker, and J. Fang, "Microplasma-assisted Synthesis of Colloidal Gold Nanoparticles and their Use in the Detection of Cardiac Tropopin", Plasma Proc. Poly. 12, 380-391 (2015)
- K.H. Becker, B.B. Godfrey, E.E. Kunhardt, M. Laroussi, L.D. Ludeking, A.A. Neuber, E. Schamiloglu, and A.J. Woods, "Robert Barker Memorial Session: Leadership in Plasma Science and Applications", IEEE Trans. Plasma Sci. 43, 914-936 (2015)
- H. Deutsch, F.X. Bronold, and K. Becker, "Calculations of Electron-Impact Ionization Cross Sections: Bottom-up Inductive vs. Top-down Deductive Approaches, Int. J. Mass Spectrom. 365/366, 128-39 (2014)
- K. Becker, O. Herskowitz, M.J. Kotch, E. Wheeler, J. Aloise, J. Byrd, and J.M. Peterson, "PowerBridgeNY: A Cleantech Proof-of-Concept Center", Technology and Innovation 16(3-4), 215-222 (2014)
