= Roland Becker =

German politician (1940–2021)

Member of the Bundestag
- In office 3 October 1990 – 20 December 1990

Personal details
- Born: 25 August 1940 Leipzig, East Germany
- Died: 2 March 2021 (aged 80) Leipzig, Germany
- Party: CDU
- Occupation: Engineer

Roland Becker (25 August 1940 – 2 March 2021) was a German politician of the Christian Democratic Union (CDU) and former member of the German Bundestag.

== Life ==
Becker joined the GDR CDU in 1971, for which he sat in the District Assembly in Leipzig from 1973 to 1990 and in the Leipzig Southwest District Assembly from 1974 to 1979. In 1990 he was a member of the last Volkskammer and until December of the German Bundestag.

== Literature ==
Herbst, Ludolf; Jahn, Bruno (2002). Vierhaus, Rudolf (ed.). Biographisches Handbuch der Mitglieder des Deutschen Bundestages. 1949–2002 [Biographical Handbook of the Members of the German Bundestag. 1949–2002] (in German). München: De Gruyter - De Gruyter Saur. p. 1715. ISBN 978-3-11-184511-1.
