= Jorge Insunza Becker =

Chilean politician (1936–2019)

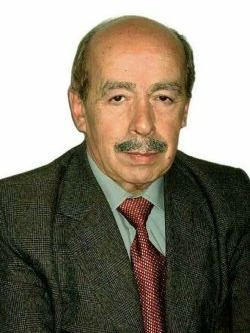

Chamber of Deputies of Chile
- In office 1969–1973

Personal details
- Born: 21 April 1936
- Died: 17 March 2019 (aged 82)

Jorge Insunza Becker (21 April 1936 – 17 March 2019) was a Chilean communist politician who served as member of the Chamber of Deputies of Chile between 1969 until 1973, after which the Chamber was dissolved following the 1973 coup d'état and went into exile.

He was responsible for the propaganda of the Salvador Allende Command, Popular Unity candidate, in the 1970 presidential election.
