= Felicitas Becker =

German historian (born 1971)

Felicitas Becker (born 1971 in Erlangen) is a German historian, currently a Professor of African History at the University of Ghent. She worked from 2010 till 2016 at the University of Cambridge, where she was also Fellow of Peterhouse. She works on AIDS, slavery and the state of Islam in East Africa, especially Tanzania.

Becker's work has been supported by grants from the Gerda Henkel Foundation and the European Research Council. She won the Ellen MacArthur Prize in Economic History at Cambridge University.

Her books include:

- Becoming Muslim in Mainland Tanzania, 1890-2000. British Academy Postdoctoral Fellowship Monographs. Oxford University Press. 11 September 2008. ISBN 9780197264270.
- Becker, Felicitas (2019). The Politics of Poverty. doi:10.1017/9781108690485. ISBN 9781108690485. S2CID 197774943.
- AIDS and religious practice in Africa. Felicitas Becker, Wenzel Geissler. Leiden. 2009. ISBN 978-90-474-4269-1. OCLC 647892585.
- Religion, media, and marginality in modern Africa. Felicitas Becker, Joel Cabrita, Marie Rodet. Athens. 2017. ISBN 978-0-8214-4624-9. OCLC 1021174074.
