= Douglas Becker =

American dancer

- Citizenship: United States
- Occupations: Choreographer, dance teacher
- Years active: 1978–
- Career
- Former groups: Joffrey Ballet; National Ballet of Canada; Dallas Ballet; Frankfurt Ballet
- Dances: Ballet; contemporary dance; dance improvisation
- Website: douglasbecker.be

Douglas Becker is a choreographer and dance teacher from the United States, who works in ballet, contemporary dance, and dance improvisation. A founding member and principal dancer of the Frankfurt Ballet under the direction of choreographer William Forsythe, he was involved in the development of many of Forsythe's early signature pieces and is one of only a few people with the authority to remount his repertory.

== Early career ==
A native of Dallas, Texas, Becker began his ballet training in Texas under Nathalia Krassovska and Stanley Hall, and continued in New York City with David Howard, Maggie Black and Marjorie Mussman. In 1978, he joined the Joffrey Ballet and worked with choreographers including Agnes de Mille, Choo San Goh and Jerome Robbins, after which he joined the National Ballet of Canada under the direction of Alexander Grant. He toured extensively with the company, performing with guest artists Rudolf Nureyev and Erik Bruhn. Joining the Dallas Ballet under Danish choreographer Flemming Flindt, Becker was then invited by William Forsythe to join the Frankfurt Ballet.

== Frankfurt Ballet ==
As a founding member and principal dancer of the Frankfurt Ballet, under Forsythe's direction, Becker was involved in the development of many of Forsythe's early signature pieces and is one of only a few people with the authority to remount his repertory. While in the Frankfurt Ballet, Becker appeared in many works created by Forsythe, including: LDC, Artifact (I, II, III, IV), France/Dance, Steptext, Behind The China Dogs, Big White Baby Dog, Die Befragung des Robert Scott, Enemy in the Figure, Herman Schmerman, Impressing the Czar, In the Middle Somewhat Elevated, Isabelle's Dance, Limbs Theorem, Love Songs, New Sleep, Same Old Story, Say Bye Bye, Skinny, Slingerland, Steptext, The Loss of Small Detail, The Second Detail, and The Vile Parody of Address. Of these works, he has since reconstructed Steptext, Artifact II, New Sleep Full length and pas de deux, The Vile Parody of Address, and Die Befragung des Robert Scott.

At Frankfurt he also worked with Amanda Miller, Stephen Petronio, Susan Marshall and Jan Fabre.

== Choreography ==
Becker has received choreography commissions from Belgium's Royal Flemish Theatre, Switzerland's Grand Théâtre de Genève, and France's CCN Ballet de Lorraine. His improvisation installation, "The Third Eye" was constructed for the Musée de Grenoble. As a Flemish Government Arts Commission grant recipient, Becker directed and performed in the stage work, Brutal Elves in the Woods, for Brussels' arts laboratory Nadine. Becker has worked as guest faculty at P.A.R.T.S. School Brussels, the National Conservatories of Paris and Lyon, New York University, and the University of California, Irvine among others. Between 2007 and 2011, Becker founded and curated the Hollins University/American Dance Festival Masters of Fine Arts international extended studies program, under the direction of Donna Faye Burchfield. In 2011/12, Douglas Becker became artist-in-residence/Professor adjoint at the University of the Arts. In 2012/13, Becker was artist-in-residence at the University of North Carolina School of the Arts.

Becker's own choreography has been described as "innovative and energetic, very graphic and with purity of movement" by Swiss newspaper 24 Heures, and praised for its "delicate, intricate partnering and fleet movements" by The New York Times.
