= Kathrin Becker =

German curator

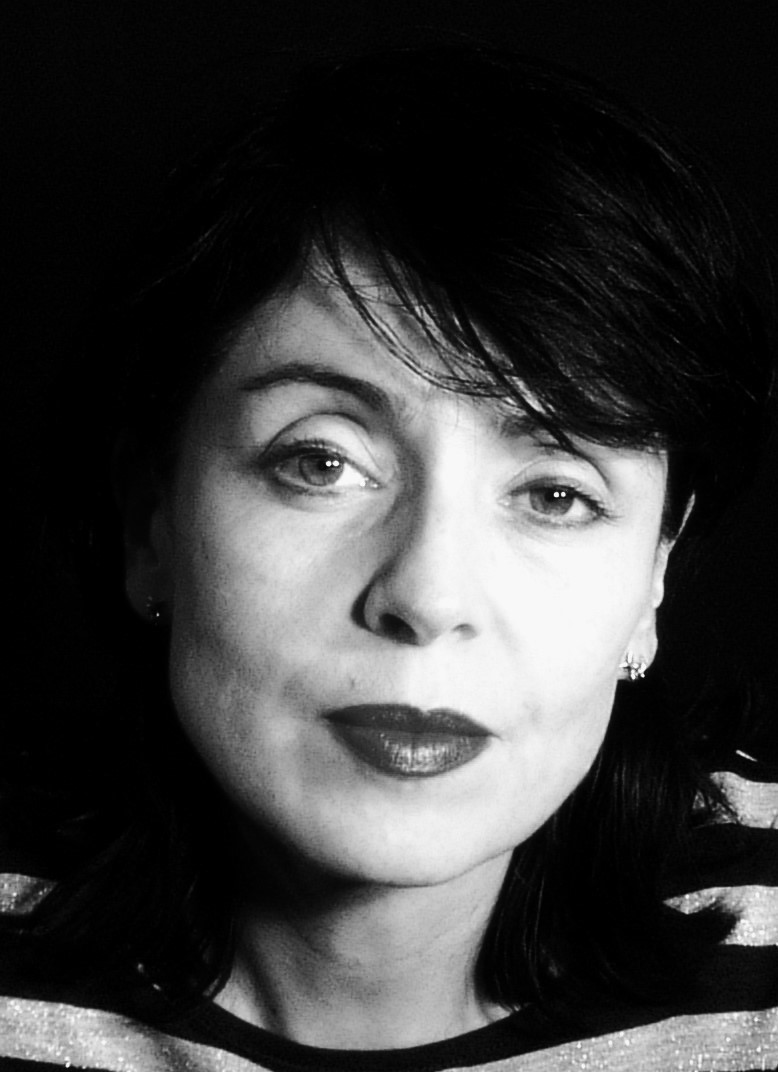
Image of Kathrin Becker

Kathrin Becker is a German curator. From 1984 to 1991, she studied art history and Slavic languages at the Ruhr University Bochum, the Moscow State University, and the Leningrad State University.

Becker started to work as head of the "Video-Forum" at the Berlin arts association "Neuer Berliner Kunstverein (NBK)" 2001, a collection of video art that includes over 1000 works of international artists from the early phase of video art in the 1960s to the present day. Becker was responsible for including some new focuses in the collection, such as the acquisition of works from the East and South East of Europe, as well as the Middle and Far East. Besides digitizing the archive's holdings, she was responsible for numerous exhibition projects, special programs and screenings, as well as collaborations with institutions in the United States, France, the UK, Mexico, Hungary, Slovakia, Moldavia, Siberia, China, Bosnia-Hercegovina, Estonia, Macedonia, and in Serbia.

Recently, Becker realized projects such as “Masculinities”, “Displaced. Interventions/Interactions in public space”, both in Berlin, 2005, or Artur Żmijewski (movie maker) - Selected works", 2007.

Becker has been head of the Video-Forum at the Neuer Berliner Kunstverein (NBK) in Berlin since 2001.
