= Elena Becker-Barroso =

Spanish molecular biologist

Elena Becker-Barroso is a Spanish molecular biologist and the editor in chief of Lancet Neurology.

== Education ==
Becker-Barroso obtained a bachelor's degree in life sciences from the University of Exeter in 1997 and has a PhD in molecular biology from the University of Salamanca.

She undertook postdoctoral research at the Skirball Institute of Biomolecular Medicine at New York University, and has a diploma in science communication from Birkbeck University.

== Career ==
Becker-Barroso joined the editorial department of The Lancet Neurology in 2005 before becoming the journal's editor-in-chief in 2012.

=== Selected publications ===
- Becker-Barroso, E. (2009, January 1). For neurologists in Cuba, hope is not embargoed. LANCET NEUROLOGY, 8(12), 1088–1089.

== Awards ==
Becker-Barroso has an honorary degree from the University of Exeter.
