= Benton Becker =

American lawyer (1938–2015)

- Born: February 22, 1938; Washington, D.C.
- Died: August 2, 2015 (aged 77)
- Education: University of Maryland; Washington College of Law at American University
- Occupation: Lawyer

Benton Becker (February 22, 1938 – August 2, 2015) was an American lawyer. He was known for negotiating Richard Nixon's presidential pardon with President Gerald Ford.

== Life and career ==
Becker was born in Washington, D.C. He attended the University of Maryland, earning his bachelor's degree in 1960. He also attended Washington College of Law, earning his law degree in 1966.

As a criminal division attorney in the fraud section for the Department of Justice in 1966, Becker was part of the team of prosecutors who empaneled a grand jury to investigate U.S. Congressman Adam Clayton Powell, Jr. It was in this assignment that Becker first met Ford, who was then a congressman from Michigan.

Becker was a representative of the General Services Administration during the 1970s.

Becker died on August 2, 2015, at the age of 77.
