= Arnulf Becker Lorca =

Chilean historian of international law

Arnulf Becker Lorca is a legal scholar specialized in the history of international law. Since September 2023, he holds the Chair of International Law at the European University Institute, one of Europe's leading postgraduate institutions.

== Career ==
Arnulf Becker Lorca is originally from Chile, where he obtained his law degree from Universidad Gabriela Mistral and a master's degree from Universidad de Chile. He pursued his postgraduate education in the United States, obtaining a doctoral degree from Harvard Law School.

Before joining the European University Institute, he was a lecturer at King's College London, a lecturer at Georgetown University, and a research professor at the Pontifical Catholic University of Valparaiso.

In 2022, Becker Lorca assisted the then-ongoing Chilean Constitutional Convention, providing legal advice during the draft process.

== Academic work ==
Becker Lorca's research focuses on how international law can enable both colonialism and resistance to colonialism. As of the end of 2024, his publications have garnered over a thousand citations in Google Scholar.

His book Mestizo international law: a global intellectual history 1842–1933, published in 2015, explores how international lawyers from outside the Western countries have been active in shaping international law during the period in question. According to the book, the intellectual contribution of lawyers from non-Western countries helped to make international law a universal system based on the principle of sovereignty, as opposed to a framework that only applied to the relations between "civilized countries". In 2016, Becker Lorca was awarded the European Society of International Law's annual book prize for his book Mestizo international law.

== Selected works ==
- Arnulf Becker Lorca, Mestizo international law: a global intellectual history 1842–1933 (Cambridge University Press, 2015).
- Arnulf Becker Lorca, "Universal International Law: Nineteenth-Century Histories of Imposition and Appropriation" (2010) 51 Harvard International Law Journal 475.
- Arnulf Becker Lorca, "Sovereignty Beyond the West: The End of Classical International Law" (2011) 13 Journal of the History of International Law 7.
- Arnulf Becker Lorca "Eurocentrism in the History of International Law" in Bardo Fassbender, Anne Peters (eds.) The Oxford Handbook of the History of International Law (Oxford University Press, 2012).
- Arnulf Becker Lorca, "Petitioning the International: A 'Pre-history' of Self-determination" (2014) 25 European Journal of International Law 497.
