= Charlie Becker (baseball) =

American baseball player (1890–1928)

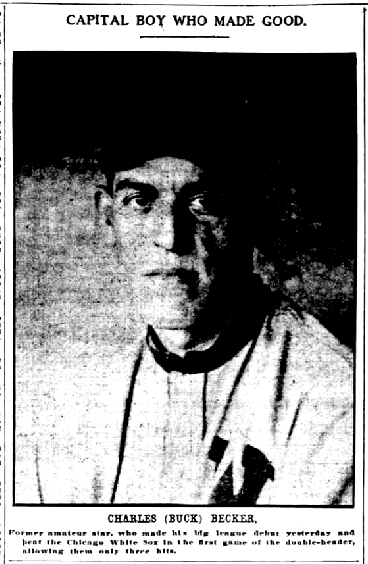
- Pitcher
- Born: October 14, 1890; Washington, D.C.
- Died: July 30, 1928 (aged 37); Washington, D.C.
- Batted: Left Threw: Left

MLB debut
- August 2, 1911, for the Washington Senators

Last MLB appearance
- May 18, 1912, for the Washington Senators

MLB statistics
- Win–loss record: 3–5
- Earned run average: 3.92
- Strikeouts: 36
- Stats at Baseball Reference

Teams
- Washington Senators (1911–1912)

Charles Schlagel "Buck" Becker (October 14, 1890 – July 30, 1928) was a Major League Baseball pitcher who played with the Washington Senators for two seasons.
