= Anke Becker =

German microbiologist (born 1967)

Anke Becker (born 1967 in Bad Godesberg, Germany) is a German microbiologist at the Philipps-Universität Marburg and director of the Centre for Synthetic Microbiology (SYNMIKRO). Her research focuses on Microbial Genetics, Genomics and Synthetic Biology.

== Biography ==
Anke Becker studied biology at Bielefeld University and graduated in 1991. She obtained her PhD in microbial genetics in 1994 and her Habilitation (venia legendi for Genetics) in 2000, also at Bielefeld University. After her PhD, she headed a research group at the Department of Genetics and, after returning from a research stay at the Massachusetts Institute of Technology (1999), a research group and the Transcriptomics Facility at the Centre for Biotechnology (CeBiTec). In 2007, she was appointed adjunct professor at Bielefeld University and in 2008 she moved to the University of Freiburg as Professor for Systems Biology of Microorganisms. Since 2011, she has been Professor of Microbiology at the University of Marburg and a member of the Centre for Synthetic Microbiology (SYNMIKRO), which was founded jointly by the University of Marburg and the Max Planck Institute for Terrestrial Microbiology in 2010. Since 2016 she has been serving as director of SYNMIKRO.

== Research ==
Becker's research focuses on the organizational principles of microbial genomes, the adaptation of microorganisms to environmental changes, and microbe-host interactions. She and her team are investigating how the cellular regulatory network allows bacteria to flexibly adapt to their environment. She also centers her studies on multi-part bacterial genomes, focusing on genome architecture, cell cycle, function and evolution. Findings from this basic research are driving her research into the implementation of new functions in bacteria using synthetic biology. This includes tailored editing and modularization of bacterial genomes and design of regulatory circuits to control genetic programs.

== Awards and honors (selection) ==
- 1992–1993 Doctoral scholarship from the German Academic Scholarship Foundation
- 1994 Doctoral thesis award of the Westfälisch-Lippische Universitätsgesellschaft
- 1998–2000 Lise-Meitner Fellowship
- 2003–2005 Heisenberg Fellowship of the German Research Foundation
- 2023 Federation of European Biochemical Societies (FEBS) National Lecture Award, Meeting of the Slovenian Biochemical Society

== Services to the scientific community (selection) ==
Becker was a member of the Senate Commission on Genetic Research (DFG) from 2015 to 2020, a member of the Review Board for Microbiology, Virology and Immunology (DFG) from 2020 to 2024, and a member of European Research Council (ERC) panels from 2016 to 2022. Becker is (section) editor of the Journal of Bacteriology (American Society for Microbiology) and microLife (European Academy of Microbiology, Federation of European Microbiological Societies), and on the advisory board of Molecular Microbiology. She is spokesperson of the PROLOEWE network for science communication of research projects funded by the Hessian Excellence Program (LOEWE), a member of the scientific advisory board of the Freiburg Institute for Advanced Studies (FRIAS), and a liaison lecturer of the German National Academic Scholarship Foundation (Studienstiftung des deutschen Volkes).

== Important publications ==
- V. Bettenworth, S. van Vliet S, B. Turkowyd, A. Bamberger, H. Wendt, M. McIntosh, W. Steinchen, U. Endesfelder und A. Becker, Frequency modulation of a bacterial quorum sensing response. In: Nature Communications, volume 13, 2022, 2772
- E. Krol, L. Stuckenschneider, J. Kästle J, P.L. Graumann und A. Becker, Stable inheritance of Sinorhizobium meliloti cell growth polarity requires an FtsN-like protein and an amidase. In: Nature Communications, volume 12, 2021, 545
- S. Schäper, W. Steinchen, E. Krol, F. Altegoer, D. Skotnicka, L. Søgaard-Andersen, G. Bange und A. Becker, AraC-like transcriptional activator CuxR binds c-di-GMP by a PilZ-like mechanism to regulate extracellular polysaccharide production. In: Proceedings of the National Academy of Sciences USA, volume 114, 2017, E4822-E4831
- J. Döhlemann, M. Wagner, C. Happel, M. Carrillo, P. Sobetzko, T.J. Erb, M. Thanbichler und A. Becker, A family of single copy repABC-type shuttle vectors stably maintained in the alpha-proteobacterium Sinorhizobium meliloti. In: ACS Synthetic Biology, volume 6, 2017, 968–984
- E. Krol und A. Becker, Rhizobial homologs of long-chain fatty acid transporter FadL facilitate perception of long chain N-acyl-homoserine lactone signals. In: Proceedings of the National Academy of Sciences USA, volume 111, 2014, 10702-10707
