= John Becker (writer) =

American dramatist

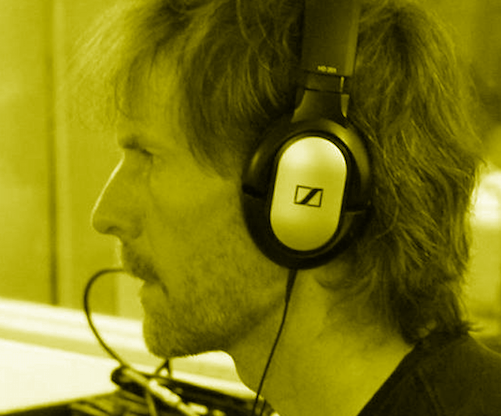
John Becker

John Becker is a American writer based in the Washington, D.C. area. His plays and films are known primarily for their dark humor. He was awarded first place in a theatre festival held at the Kennedy Center in Washington, D.C for a work entitled Summit Meeting. He was also awarded three Individual Artist Grants for both fiction and play writing through the Maryland State Arts Council. His plays have been produced throughout the country, including the Emerging Artists Theatre in New York.

His play The Last Sacred Place was produced several times, notably featured in Amnesty International's Human Rights Arts Festival, and also winning an Individual Artist's Grant from the Maryland State Arts Council. The Last Sacred Place is a dark comedy about the bizarre role guns play in American society. In 2010, his play The Ghosts of Dickens was included in the Kennedy Center's Page to Stage Festival. The Ghosts of Dickens earned Becker his third Individual Artist's Award, as reported in the Washington Post. It was also performed virtually in 2020 at the Penny Seats Theater in Ann Arbor, Michigan, and at the Classic Theatre of Maryland in 2023. In 2011 Becker was working with novelist Susan Coll in adapting her comic novel karlmarx.com, which was also part of the Kennedy Center Page to Stage Festival. Actors from the DC area were in this cast, including Anne Bowles, Drew Kopas, Susan Derry, Jon Watkins, and Terence Aselford. A long-time musician/composer, by 2013 he had turned his attention to musical theatre. His musical Everything I Do was loosely adapted from George Bernard Shaw's Man and Superman. It was chosen by Artist's Bloc for a reading at the Source Theatre in D.C. Everything I Do was also produced at the Atlas in D.C. to excellent reviews, calling it "lively and funny...well-written" and “whip smart” with "moments of brilliance." In 2015, Becker wrote an article called "Existential Twerking" for Howlround at Emerson College. The article focused on the dilemma of struggling for artistic achievement rather than the yearning for attention, citing Eva Cassidy as a classic artist, whom Becker had seen live in a nearly empty barroom in Alexandria, Virginia. He had scribbled his phone number on a napkin for Cassidy, offering his services should she ever need a guitar player, but regretted not giving it to her because he didn't want to offend her guitarist that night. Shortly after, Cassidy had died.

In 2015 he was asked to contribute plays to the One-Minute Play Festival, held at the Round House Theatre. In 2016 he co-wrote and co-produced the short film Thirst. In 2017 he wrote, produced, and directed the short film Finding Sandy (which premiered at the North Beach Film Festival). Finding Sandy concerns a suicidal man who persuades his childhood best friend to help him find the girl he loved in elementary school. In 2018 he again wrote, produced, and directed the film What They Seem. This film made the rounds on the film festival circuit, garnering interest due to its dark comedy and socially relevant theme. Becker’s play, Torn, concerned Teddy Roosevelt’s private White House dinner invitation to Booker T. Washington in 1901. Torn examines the national scandal that the event became. It was produced as a virtual film event by the Amazing Theatre Company in 2021. Torn was also performed by the Avant Bard Theatre, in collaboration with Jane Franklin Dance. In an interview with Jaime Alejandro of the podcast Arts Calling, Becker spoke about many aspects of his writing career. He elaborated further in an interview with Kellie Scott Reed’s interview series “A Word” by Roi Faineant Press. (He was later to work with Reed on his Deep End series.) Both interviews feature his many odd experiences, including nearly touring the US as a budding rock star and receiving a phone call from an elderly woman who believed Becker was her dead husband. With actress/writer Tia Shearer Bassett, he co-created a children's series called Eugene Cheese Gets It Wrong. This series was shown in Children's Hospital locations across the US through the Ryan Seacrest Foundation with the goal of helping hospitalized kids to laugh and learn. In 2024, John Becker began to write and direct the mystery/comedy series Deep End. The series concerns strangers at a campground who discover that they’re surrounded by a mysterious group in the woods. One of Deep Ends themes is how society's inability to communicate causes a level of absurdity and divisiveness that often results in comedy, but just as often escalates into tragedy. Deep End is licensed by the global Fawesome TV and others. The series features a number of talented DC actors, including Beth Hylton, Veronica Del Cerro, Vince Eisenson, Gerrad Taylor, Christopher Holbert, Alyssa Sanders, Karen Vincent, Jon Watkins, Debora Crabbe, Anna DiGiovanni, and Nick DePinto. In 2025, Deep End was a awarded a grant from the Arts and Humanities Council of Montgomery County for artistic excellence and impact on the community.

== Published works ==
- Consider the Ravens (play, 1998)
- "Milton" (short story, 1999)
- Summit Meeting
- The Last Sacred Place (play, 2005)
- Existential Twerking (essay, 2015)
