= George Becker (composer) =

German-Swiss composer and writer on music (1834–1928)

George Becker (Georg) (24 June 1834 – 18 July 1928) was a German-Swiss composer and writer on music.

Becker was born at Frankenthal. He was the author of several books of some importance, such as, La musique en Suisse, depuis les temps les plus reculés jusqu'à la fin du XVIIIème siècle (Geneva, 1874), Pygmalion de J.J. Rousseau, Eustorg de Beaulieu, Guillaume de Guéroult, Notice sur Claude Goudimel, Aperçu sur la Chanson française. For some time, at irregular intervals, Becker published a kind of periodical called Questionnaire de l'association international des musiciens-écrivains, and he was a contributor to various periodicals, such as the Revue et gazette musicale, the Guide musical of Brussels, the Monatshefte für Musikgeschichte, the Musical World, and the Gazzetta musicale. He is believed to have died in Geneva.
