= Charles J. Becker =

American politician (1924–2007)

Charles Joseph Becker

Member of the Missouri House of Representatives

Personal details
- Born: July 3, 1924 near Arnold, Missouri
- Died: December 20, 2007 (aged 83)
- Party: Democratic
- Spouse: Marion
- Children: 4 (3 daughters, 1 son)

Charles Joseph Becker (July 3, 1924 – December 20, 2007) was an American politician who served in the Missouri House of Representatives.

== Career ==
He was first elected to the Missouri House of Representatives in 1972. Becker was educated in parochial and public schools in Jefferson County, Missouri. He served three years in the U.S. Army and in the Pacific Theater during World War II. His wife Marion was once the mayor of Arnold, Missouri.
