= Johnnie Becker =

American football player (1903–1947)

Profile
- Positions: Tackle, guard, back

Personal information
- Born: February 10, 1903; Dayton, Ohio, U.S.
- Died: September 17, 1947 (aged 44)
- Listed height: 5 ft 11 in (1.80 m)
- Listed weight: 208 lb (94 kg)

Career information
- High school: Steele (OH)
- College: Dayton, Denison

Career history
- Dayton Triangles (1926–1929)

Career statistics
- Games: 19

John Wiggim Becker Jr. (February 10, 1903 – September 17, 1947) was an American football player.

Becker was born in 1904 at Dayton, Ohio. He attended Steele High School in Dayton. He then enrolled at Denison University where he played college football as a guard from 1923 to 1925.

Becker also played professional football in the National Football League (NFL) for the Dayton Triangles. He appeared in 19 NFL games, 14 as a starter, during the 1926, 1927, 1928, and 1929 seasons. He played principally at the tackle position but also played some at guard and back.

After his football career ended, Becker remained in Dayton, engaging in the real estate and insurance business. He later moved to Alabama where he worked for the All States Insurance Company. In 1939, he moved to Miami, Florida. He became president of the Becker Lumber Company in Miami. He died of a heart attack in 1947 at age 43 at a Miami hotel. He had moved temporarily into a hotel due to a hurricane that threatened his home in Miami Beach
