= George Becker (musician) =

American country musician (born 1963)

George Becker (born 1963) is an American New Jersey–based country music artist, singer, guitarist, and songwriter. He was the founder of rock band Jaded Past before crossing over into the country world.

== Early life ==
George Becker was born on April 20, 1963, in Elizabeth, New Jersey, to Rosaria Nastasi Becker and George Becker Sr.

Becker has four children and resides in New Jersey.

== Career ==
Becker is a country rock singer songwriter recording and touring artist. Becker was also the lead singer, guitarist, and front man for the rock band Jaded Past.

He traces his country music style to artist like Brantley Gilbert, Eric Church and Jason Aldean but his early rock influences came from bands like T-Rex, The New York Dolls, Kiss, David Bowie, Elton John, Bon Jovi and Steven Tyler.

In 2012, a self-titled debut album Jaded Past was released early, co-produced by Steve Brown.

In 2016, Becker signed with Melodic Rock Records and released Jaded Past's second album Believe, also produced by Brown.

In 2021, Jaded Past's Live And On Edge was released on Melodic Rock Records. It was a compilation of performances over 2018 - 2020, co-produced by Becker.

In 2021 released his first country crossover album on Melodic Rock Records followed up by numerous digital single releases and has never looked back.

Cover Bands

- Rat Salad 1979 – 1982
- HEX 1982 – 1984
- If 6 was 9 1995 – 2006
- 10 MINUTE LINCOLN 2007 – 2018

Original Bands

- Wicked Sin 1984 – 1988, 2010 – 2011
- Pretty Pleeze 1988 – 1989
- Jaded Past 2011 – 2022
- George Becker Solo – Since 2021

== Discography ==
- Wicked Sin Strictly for Pleasure 2010
- Jaded Past EP Bad Influence 2011
- Jaded Past Jaded Past 2012
- Jaded Past Believe 2016
- Jaded Past Live And On Edge 2021
- George Becker George Becker 2021
- George Becker All Alone 2022
- George Becker You Move To Fast 2023
- George Becker Old Friend Old Memories 2023
- George Becker Peace of Country 2023
