= Becker (disambiguation) =

Becker is a German surname.

Becker may also refer to:

== Places ==
=== United States ===
- Becker, Florida
- Becker, Minnesota
- Becker, Mississippi
- Becker, Texas
- Becker County, Minnesota
- Becker Township, Minnesota (disambiguation)

=== Antarctica ===
- Mount Becker, a prominent mountain 1 mile northeast of Mount Boyer, in the Merrick Mountains, Ellsworth Land

== Businesses ==
- A. G. Becker, former U.S. investment bank
- Becker Entertainment, Australian entertainment company
- Becker Film Group, Australian company founded in 2008
- Becker Group, Australian independent film and television distribution company, 1965–2007
- Becker's, Canadian convenience store chain
- Château Marquis d'Alesme Becker, Bordeaux wine producer, archaically named simply Becker
- Harman Becker Automotive Systems, known as Becker, manufacturer of car audio systems and part of Harman International Industries

== Taxonomy ==
- Becker, taken as a taxonomic authority, may refer to:
  - Alexander K. Becker (1818–1901), German botanist and entomologist
  - Johann Becker (entomologist) (1932–2004), Brazilian entomologist

== Education ==
- Becker College, Worcester and Leicester, Massachusetts
- Becker Professional Education, a company that offers educational resources for professionals in the areas of accounting, finance, and project management.
- Carl Becker House, residential college at Cornell University, named after Carl L. Becker

== Medicine ==
- Becker's muscular dystrophy, named after Peter Emil Becker
- Becker disease, a neuromuscular disease
- Becker's nevus, skin disorder documented by Samuel William Becker

== Fiction ==
- Becker (TV series), a CBS sitcom that ran from 1998 to 2004
- Captain Becker, character in the ITV sci-fi drama Primeval

== Other ==
- Becker Psalter (1602), German metrical psalter published by Cornelius Becker
- Becker 20mm cannon, German automatic cannon developed for aircraft use during World War I
- Nightfreak and the Sons of Becker (2004), rock album by The Coral
- Pettkus v. Becker (1980), Canadian family law decision

== See also ==
- Becquer (disambiguation)
- Becher (disambiguation)
- Beaker (disambiguation)
