= Becher =

Becher (German for "mug") is a surname. Notable people with the surname include:

- Amy Becher (born 1978), American curler
- Andrew Cracroft Becher, CBE (1858–1929), British Army major-general
- Balthasar Bekker, Dutch minister and author of philosophical and theological works
- Bernd and Hilla Becher, German photographers
- Eduard Becher (1856–1886), Austrian entomologist
- Giora Becher, Israel's Ambassador to Brazil from 2008 until 2011
- Hans-Jürgen Becher (1941–2026), German footballer
- Heinz Manfred Becher (1933–2019), West German rower
- Henry Becher (fl. 1561), English translator and vicar of Mayfield
- Henry Corry Rowley Becher (1817–1895), Canadian lawyer, politician and author
- Johann Joachim Becher (1635–1682), German physician and alchemist
- Johannes R. Becher (1891–1958), German politician and writer
- Johannes Becher (politician, born 1988), German politician
- John A. Becher (1833–1915), American businessman and politician
- John C. Becher (1915–1986), American stage and television actor
- John Thomas Becher (1770–1848), English clergyman, social reformer and Vicar-General of Southwell Minster
- Kurt Becher (1909–1995), German SS officer
- Michael Becher (1704–1758), Bristol-born English slave trader and merchant
- Mordechai Becher, author and lecturer on Jewish theology
- Ricardo Becher (1930–2011), Argentine film director, screenwriter and journalist
- Ruth Becher (born 1956), Austrian politician
- Siegfried Becher (1806–1873), Austrian political economist
- Simon Becher (born 1999), American professional soccer player
- Ulrich Becher, German writer
- Verónica Becher, Argentinian computer scientist
- Walter Becher (1912–2005), German Bohemian politician, representative of the All-German Bloc/League of Expellees and Deprived of Rights (GB/BHE)

== Other uses ==
- Becher (biblical figure), the name of two historic personalities of the Old Testament
- Becher Peninsula, Nunavut, Canada
- Becher Point Wetlands, Western Australia
- Becher process, a process used to convert ilmenite to synthetic rutile
- Port Kennedy, Western Australia, formerly known as Becher
- Becher's Brook, celebrated fence at Aintree Racecourse
- Becher process, an industrial process used to produce rutile, a form of titanium dioxide, from the ore ilmenite
- Jan Becher, Czech company
- Wrixon-Becher baronets, a title in the Baronetage of the United Kingdom

== See also ==
- Becquer (disambiguation)
- Becker (disambiguation)
- Beaker (disambiguation)
