= Albert Becker =

Albert Becker may refer to:

- Albert Becker (chess player) (1896–1984), Austrian-Argentine International Master
- Albert Becker (composer) (1834–1899), German composer, conductor and academic
- Albert L. Becker (1911–1992), American naval officer

== See also ==
- Albrecht Becker (1906–2002), German designer, photographer and actor
- Becker (disambiguation)
