= DeVry University =

For-profit university in the United States

- Type: Private for-profit university
- Established: 1931; 95 years ago (as DeForest Training School)
- Founder: Herman A. DeVry
- Parent institution: Cogswell Education
- President: Elise Awwad
- Provost: Shantanu Bose
- Faculty: 57 full-time and 1,132 part-time
- Students: 27,867
- Location: Lisle, Illinois, United States; 41°48′00″N 88°07′35″W
- Campus: Multiple: 11 states in the U.S. and online
- Website: www.devry.edu

DeVry University (/dəˈvraɪ/) is a private for-profit university in the United States. It offers both onsite (campus-based) and online programs. The university was founded in 1931 by Herman A. DeVry and is accredited by the Higher Learning Commission. It has been the subject of several government investigations and lawsuits alleging false or deceptive claims.

== History ==
=== Early history (1931–1970) ===
DeVry was founded in 1931 as the De Forest Training School in Chicago, Illinois. School founder Herman A. DeVry, who had previously invented a motion picture projector and produced educational and training films, named the school after his friend Lee de Forest. De Forest Training School originally taught projector and radio repair, but later expanded to include other electronic equipment such as televisions. After its founder's death in March 1941, the school was renamed DeVry Technical Institute in 1953 and gained accreditation to confer associate degrees in electronics in 1957.

Bell & Howell completed its acquisition of DeVry Technical Institute in 1967. A year later, the company acquired the Ohio Institute of Technology and DeVry was renamed DeVry Institute of Technology, which was accredited to confer bachelor's degrees in electronics in 1969.

=== Keller Graduate School of Management (1970–1990) ===
Dennis Keller and Ronald Taylor met one another in the early 1970s when the two were teachers at DeVry. Keller and Taylor learned the economics of for-profit education while at DeVry and, in 1973, the two founded the Keller Graduate School of Management with $150,000 in loans from friends and family. The school was originally conceived as a day school that granted certificates. In 1976, the Keller School became an evening program offering MBAs, focused on working adults. The school was fully accredited by the North Central Association of Colleges and Schools in 1977, becoming the first for-profit school to be accredited by the body.

DeVry first received full accreditation in 1981. The Keller Graduate School of Management acquired DeVry from Bell & Howell in 1987. The leveraged buyout was worth $147.4 million. The two schools were combined as DeVry Inc., with Keller acting as chairman and CEO and Taylor as president and COO.

=== DeVry Education Group (1990–2018) ===
DeVry Inc. completed its initial public offering on June 21, 1991. In 1992, DeVry lost the highest scoring basketball game in history to Troy State University (now Troy University), 258 to 141.

In 1995, its stock began trading on the New York Stock Exchange.

In 1996, DeVry acquired Becker CPA Review—a firm that prepared students for the Uniform Certified Public Accountant Examination—for an undisclosed amount of cash, the tentative purchase price of which was US$18.685 million (about equivalent to US$38,000,000 in 2025). In 2003, DeVry acquired Ross University, a medical and veterinary school based in the Caribbean, for a price variously reported at $310 million (about $543 million in 2025) and $329 million ($576 million in 2025). DeVry moved into the nursing field in March 2005 with the acquisition of Deaconess College of Nursing, a St. Louis–based nursing college that conferred both associate's and bachelor's degrees in nursing, at a price variously reported at about $5.3 million ($8.74 million in 2025) and $5.4 million ($8.9 million in 2025). Deaconess College of Nursing was later renamed Chamberlain College of Nursing.

DeVry Inc. entered Brazil with its 2009 acquisition of Faculdade Nordeste (FANOR), Ruy Barbosa and ÁREA 1, which are universities located in the Northeast of Brazil.

In 2010, DeVry University had nearly 90 campus learning sites in 26 states and more than 7,000 employees. The parent company had more than 12,000 employees. DeVry University's undergraduate enrollment reached 68,290 students by the summer of 2010.

In 2012, the university acquired Faculdade Boa Viagem and Faculdade do Vale do Ipojuca. DeVry acquired a sixth Brazilian university, Faculdade Differencial Integral, in 2013. DeVry Inc. was renamed DeVry Education Group later that year. DeVry Education Group changed its name to Adtalem Global Education in May 2017, and announced in December 2017 that they would hand off DeVry University and Keller Graduate School to Cogswell Education (a division of Palm Ventures) for no upfront cost, pending regulatory and accreditor approval.

In December 2018, the parent company Adtalem finalized the handover of both DeVry University and Keller Graduate School of Management to Cogswell Education.

=== Cogswell Education (Since 2018) ===
DeVry University's parent company is Cogswell Education, LLC. Cogswell purchased DeVry at no original cost from Adtalem Education. However, Cogswell could pay up to US$20 million. Cogswell Education is headquartered in Greenwich, Connecticut. The principal investor is Bradley Palmer of Palm Ventures. Mr. Palmer has been involved in flipping Heald College, UEI College, and American Education Center.

In December 2018, in a report titled VA's Oversight of State Approving Agency Program Monitoring for Post-9/11 GI Bill Students, the Department of Veterans Office of Inspector General mentioned DeVry's use of false claims. However the Veterans Affairs office did not indicate that any action would be forthcoming.

In 2020, Tom Monahan III became president and CEO of DeVry.

In 2022, the US government discharged more than $71 million in student loan debt for 1,800 former students of DeVry University, asserting that the university deceived students in the enrollment process.

In 2023, Elise Awwad became the first female President and CEO of DeVry. The main campus and headquarters were moved to Lisle, Illinois.

Devry has a case pending in Illinois challenging borrower defense to repayment (fraud) claims against the school. More than 30,000 fraud claims have been filed against DeVry.

== Locations and campus closures ==
Between 2020 and 2022, all DeVry campuses were closed due to the COVID-19 pandemic. List of DeVry campuses and learning centers, as of 2026:

Arizona (6 students)

- Phoenix Campus

California (2,403 students)

- Encino Campus
- Newark Campus
- Ontario Campus
- San Diego Campus
- San Jose Center

Florida (114 students)

- Orlando Campus

Georgia (522 students)

- Decatur Campus

Illinois (31,296 students, includes online)

- Chicago Campus
- Chicago Loop Campus
- Naperville Center

New Jersey (67 students)

- Iselin Campus

New York (107 students)

- Midtown Manhattan Campus

Ohio (211 students)

- Columbus Campus

Texas (17 students)

- Irving Campus

Virginia (19 students)

- Arlington Campus

=== Campus closures ===
In April 2015, DeVry University announced the closing of 14 campuses around the United States by 2016. The closures occurred in Kansas City; Memphis; Houston; St. Louis; Tampa; Greenwood Village, Colorado; Edina, Minnesota; Milwaukee; and Maryland Heights, Missouri. Students affected by the campus closings were eligible for discounted tuition to attend online or other campus locations for the remainder of their degree program. In fiscal year 2018, DeVry closed eight additional campuses. According to the US Department of Education, DeVry closed five more campuses between 2019 and 2020. In 2021, Raleigh (NC), Merrillville (IN), Paramus (NJ) and Cleveland (OH) sites were closed. In 2022, at least 15 additional campuses closed.

== Academics ==
DeVry University offers undergraduate and graduate programs onsite and online within its six areas of study: Accounting, Business, Healthcare, Technology, Liberal Arts, and Media Arts & Technology.

DeVry operates on a uniform academic calendar for both undergraduate and graduate degree programs. The university's academic calendar consists of six eight-week sessions. Most degree programs are offered at both the associate's and bachelor's level. In addition, the institution offers various certificate programs in specific subfields such as information technology.

Courses and programs are also offered online. DeVry has offered graduate classes online since 1998 and undergraduate classes since 2001.

=== Faculty ===
The US Department of Education's College Navigator reports 61 full-time faculty and 765 part-time instructors for 26,384 students at DeVry-Illinois.

=== Accreditation ===
DeVry is accredited by the Higher Learning Commission. Engineering technology programs are accredited campus-by-campus.

=== Student outcomes ===
According to the National Center for Education Statistics, DeVry University-Illinois has a six-year graduation rate of 28%, for first-time full-time students who began their studies in 2013. While the university's 3-year student loan default rate is 11.2%, a Brookings Institution report found that DeVry's five-year default rate was 43%. The College Scorecard reports of a graduation rate of 18% for DeVry University-Illinois. Of those students in repayment, 31% were in forbearance, 29% were not making progress, 10% were in deferment, 10% defaulted, 10% were making progress, 6% were delinquent, 3% were paid in full, and 1% were discharged. For the 2018–19 academic year, the amount that all undergraduate students received in federal student loans was $69.42 million. Median salary after attending ranges from $23,000 to $62,000 depending on the field of study and location.

== Investigations, lawsuits, and settlements ==
DeVry University has been the subject of numerous investigations and lawsuits alleging a variety of false or deceptive practices. Some of the cases led to multi-million dollar settlements, though DeVry continued to deny the allegations. In 2014, accumulated student loan debt from DeVry University and Keller, its graduate school, was about $12.1 billion.

=== 1990s ===
In March 1995, DeVry's ability to grant U.S. degrees through its Calgary facilities was discussed during a session of the Alberta Legislative Assembly. Therein, Grant Mitchell—then the Leader of the Opposition for the Alberta Liberal Party—accused the Premier of Alberta, Ralph Klein, of maintaining a conflict of interest with DeVry through his relationship with John Ballheim, who was at the time an executive at DeVry serving as both the president of DeVry's Calgary campus and as a member of the Premier's special advisory council on postsecondary education. Klein denied any conflict of interest. In 1995, DeVry was also suspended from the Ontario Student Assistance Program after a large number of its students misreported their income. DeVry was reinstated after paying fines of C$1.7 million (equivalent to C$3.19 million in 2025) to Ontario and putting up a letter of credit totalling C$2 million (C$3.75 million in 2025).

In 1996, students of DeVry's Toronto campus filed a class-action suit of C$400 million (C$739 million in 2025.) claiming poor educational quality and job preparation; the suit was dismissed on technical grounds.

=== 2000s ===
In November 2000, Afshin Zarinebaf, Ali Mousavi, and another graduate of one of DeVry University's Chicago-area campuses filed a class-action lawsuit accusing DeVry of widespread deception, unlawful business practices, and false advertising, alleging that students were not being prepared for high-tech jobs. The lawsuit contributed to a 20% slide in the company's stock. The suit was not certified and the case was resolved for less than US$25,000 (US$39,927 in 2025) in June 2006.

In 2001, DeVry became the first for-profit college or university to obtain permission from the Alberta Canada provincial government to grant degrees, on recommendation by the Private Colleges Accreditation Board. This decision was opposed by the Alberta New Democrats (sitting in opposition), the University of Calgary Faculty Association, the Canadian Federation of Students, and the Canadian Association of University Teachers.

In January 2002, Royal Gardner, a graduate of one of DeVry University's Los Angeles–area campuses, filed a class-action complaint against DeVry Inc. and DeVry University, Inc. on behalf of students in the post-baccalaureate degree program in Information Technology. The suit alleged that the nature of the program was misrepresented by the advertising. The lawsuit was dismissed and refiled. During the first quarter of 2004, a new complaint was filed in the same court by Gavino Teanio with the same general allegations. This action was stayed pending the outcome of the Gardner lawsuit. The lawsuits were being settled in late 2006.

In April 2007, the states of New York, Illinois, and Missouri settled with three institutions that were participating in questionable student-loan practices. DeVry, Career Education Corporation, and Washington University in St. Louis were involved with the settlement. DeVry agreed to refund US$88,122 (US$136,829 in 2025) it received in revenue sharing from Citibank to students.

In 2008, DeVry was accused of filing false claims and statements about recruitment pay and performance to the government of the United States.

=== 2010s ===
DeVry was one of the universities highlighted in the 2018 documentary Fail State, which followed several stories of students who struggled with student loan debt after attending for-profit colleges. Murray Hastie, an Iraq War veteran with post-traumatic stress disorder, told his story about how he ended up with $50,000 in student loan debt after his experience at DeVry.

In January 2013, a lawsuit was filed by a former manager at DeVry which alleged that the college bribed students for positive performance reviews and worked around federal regulations on for-profit colleges. In April 2013, the attorneys general of Illinois and Massachusetts issued subpoenas to DeVry to investigate for violations of federal law and filing false information about loans, grants, and guarantees. In July 2014, DeVry stated that the office of the New York Attorney General was investigating whether the company's marketing violated laws against false advertising.

In March 2016, the Veterans Administration reprimanded DeVry over allegations of deceptive marketing practices made by the Federal Trade Commission and suspended DeVry University from its "Principles of Excellence" status under the G.I. Bill. On December 15, 2016, the Federal Trade Commission settled a US$100 million suit against DeVry, which alleged that DeVry's advertisements deceived consumers about the likelihood that students would find jobs in their fields of study, and would earn more than those graduating with bachelor's degrees from other colleges or universities. Students were eligible for a refund who: enrolled in a bachelor's or associate degree program at DeVry University between January 1, 2008, and October 1, 2015; paid at least US$5,000 with cash, loans, or military benefits; did not get debt or loan forgiveness as part of this settlement; and completed at least one class credit.

Separately, on June 16, 2016, two former DeVry students filed a demand for arbitration with the American Arbitration Association. DeVry responded by suing the students, claiming the dispute belongs in court and not in arbitration.

In May 2017, the Higher Learning Commission designated DeVry "under governmental investigation" as a result of a Massachusetts Attorney General investigation alleging "fraudulent or deceptive practices". In September 2017, the Higher Learning Commission removed this designation after DeVry negotiated a settlement.

In August 2018, the Associated Press reported that according to United States Department of Education documents, DeVry received more than 3,600 (over 15%) of the 24,000 federal fraud complaints lodged against for-profit colleges between January 20, 2017, and April 30, 2018. This is in conjunction with a "nearly 20 percent" decrease in enrollment in the last year.

In March 2019, former DeVry student Eric Luongo was invited to testify before the House Subcommittee on Labor, Health and Human Services, Education and Related Agencies about his experience at the university. Luongo, a disabled veteran, said he thought he would attend DeVry for free by using his GI Bill benefits. Luongo alleged that he was coerced into filling out federal loan paperwork and signing promissory notes. The result was that the veteran was left with over $100,000 in debt and a degree in graphic design with which he failed to procure gainful employment.

=== 2020s ===
In 2022, DeVry University was one of 153 institutions included in student loan cancellation due to alleged fraud. The class action was brought by a group of more than 200,000 student borrowers, assisted by the Project on Predatory Student Lending, part of the Legal Services Center of Harvard Law School. A settlement was approved in August 2022, stating that the schools on the list included "substantial misconduct by the listed schools, whether credibly alleged or in some instances proven." In April 2023, the Supreme Court rejected a challenge to the settlement and allowed to proceed the debt cancellation due to alleged fraud.

== Alumni ==
Notable DeVry University alumni include:

- Dave Bennett, Class of 1985, software engineer and CTO
- Steve Cartwright, Class of 1977, video game designer
- David Crane, Class of 1975, co-founder of Activision
- Wendell Gilliard, politician, attended Bell and Howell School of Technology
- Adeline Gray, three-time world champion wrestler
- Ms. Juicy Baby, entertainer
- George Weah, President of Liberia and retired soccer player, attended DeVry in Miami
- Sean Wiley, Class of 1993, Pennsylvania state senator

Keller Graduate School of Management alumni:

- Catherine Afeku, Ghanaian politician and Cabinet Minister
- J. D. Mesnard, politician, MPA from Keller Graduate School of Management
- Gabriela Mosquera, New Jersey General Assemblywoman
- Xavier Serbiá, Puerto Rican financial advisor, former singer and actor, member of boy band Menudo from 1980 to 1983.

== Past partnerships and political interests ==
In 2011, DeVry University partnered with the United States Olympic Committee (USOC) to become an official education provider for the United States' Olympic teams. In April 2016, the USOC announced an extension of its partnership with DeVry through 2020. According to the USOC, more than 125 Team USA student athletes were enrolled in DeVry programs.

In April 2014, DeVry University was named the "official education provider" for NFL Pro Legends, a group supporting players, coaches and other professionals who worked for NFL teams.

DeVry University was the official education and career development partner of Minor League Baseball. DeVry University and its Keller Graduate School of Management will provide higher education opportunities at the undergraduate and graduate levels for players, their spouses, umpires and National Association of Professional Baseball Leagues (NAPBL) employees and alumni through 2017.

The peak year for DeVry's lobbying in Congress was 2011, when it spent more than $720,000. The largest amount went to Thompson Coburn LLP. Democratic lobbyist Heather Podesta was a major lobbyist for DeVry University from 2010 to 2015.

Adtalem's stock price rebounded after the inauguration of Donald Trump in 2017. This has been attributed to deregulation by the U.S. Department of Education under Secretary Betsy DeVos, which contrasted with the more prosecutorial approach of the Obama administration.

== See also ==
- For-profit higher education in the United States
- ITT Technical Institute
- List of colleges and universities in metropolitan Atlanta
