= 1885 in the United Kingdom =

Events from the year 1885 in the United Kingdom.

== Incumbents ==
- Monarch – Victoria
- Prime Minister – William Ewart Gladstone (Liberal) (until 9 June); Robert Gascoyne-Cecil, 3rd Marquess of Salisbury (Conservative) (starting 23 June)

== Events ==
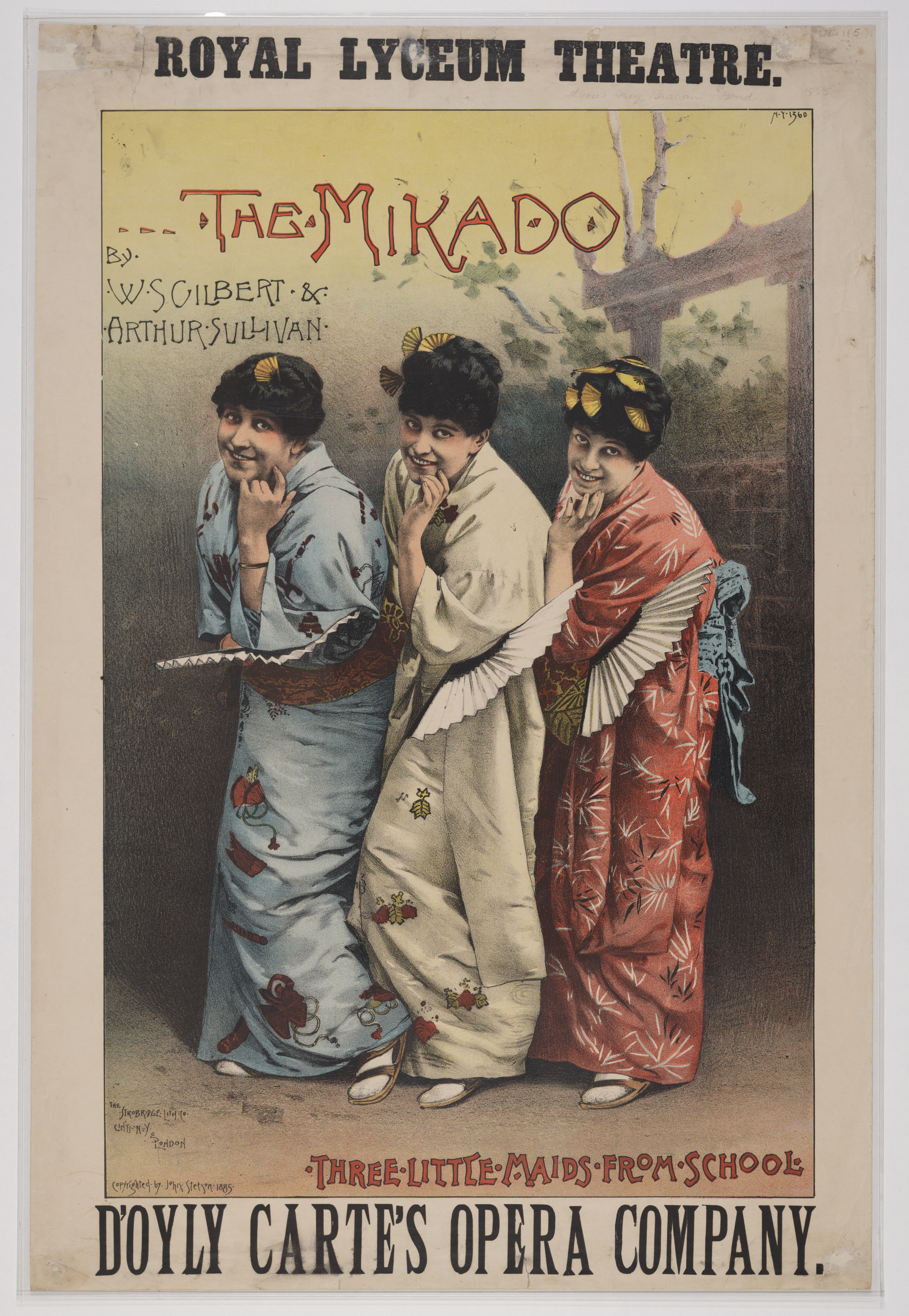
Theatre poster for The Mikado

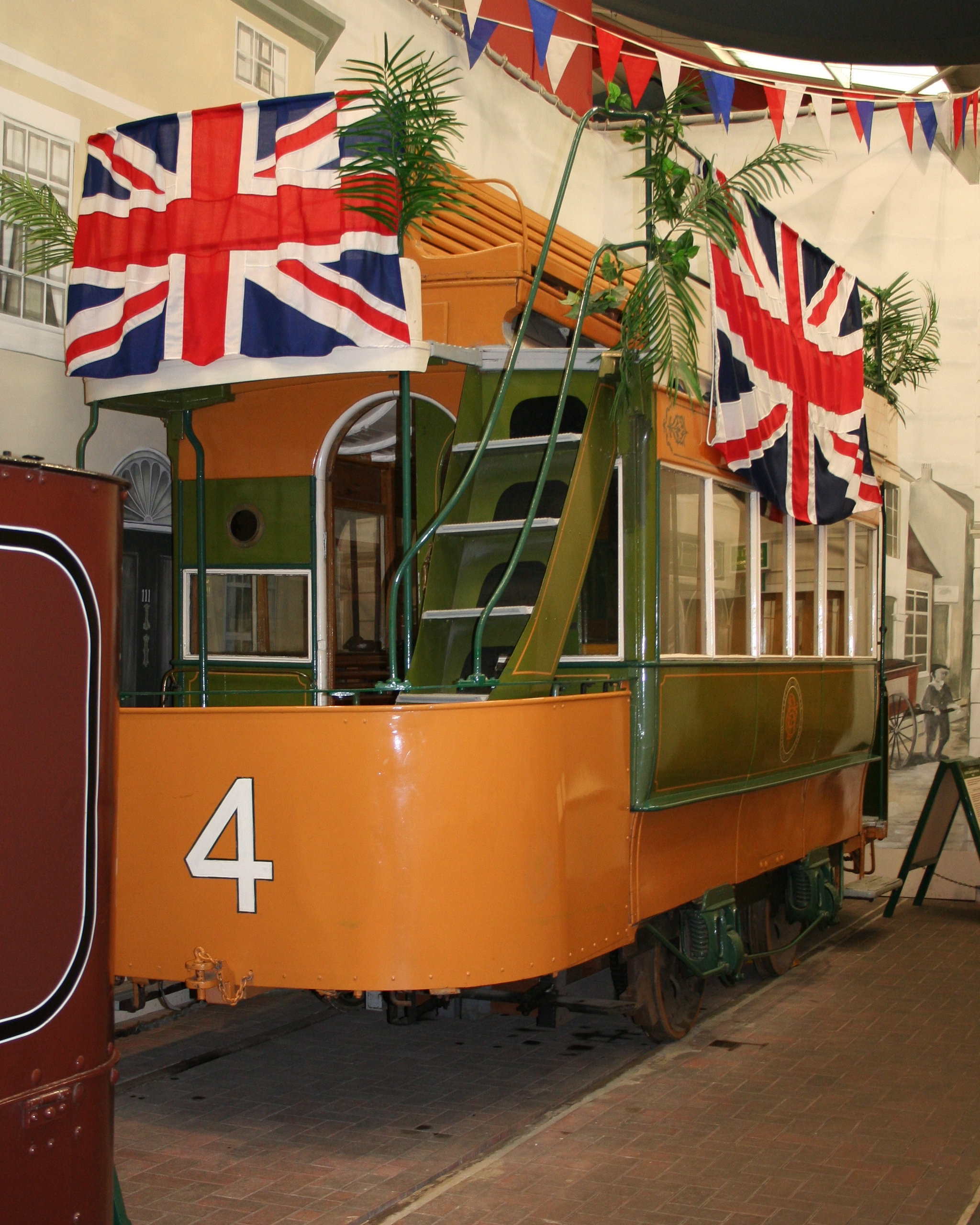
Original Blackpool Tramway car

- January – The Socialist League is formed as a breakaway from the Social Democratic Federation by William Morris, Eleanor Marx and others.
- 17 January – Mahdist War: British victory at the Battle of Abu Klea.
- 24 January
  - Fenian dynamite campaign: Irish terrorists damage Westminster Hall and the Tower of London with dynamite, the last explosions of the campaign.
  - Edge Hill College opens in Liverpool, the first non-denominational teacher training college for women in England.
- 26 January – Mahdist War: in Sudan, following the Siege of Khartoum, British and Egyptian forces are defeated by the Mahdist Sudanese. The British commander Charles George Gordon is killed.
- 4 February – The National Association for Employment of Reserve and Discharged Soldiers (modern-day RFEA – The Forces Employment Charity) is set up to help ex-military personnel find civilian jobs.
- 23 February – The executioner at HM Prison Exeter fails after several attempts to hang John 'Babbacombe' Lee, sentenced for the murder of his employer Emma Keyse last year; Lee's sentence is commuted to life imprisonment.
- 26 February – The Berlin Conference concludes with the major European powers including the United Kingdom establishing their spheres of influence in the "scramble for Africa".
- 14 March – Gilbert and Sullivan's comic opera The Mikado opens at the Savoy Theatre in London.
- 26 March – First modern organised legal cremation in England: widowed painter Jeanette Pickersgill of London, "well known in literary and scientific circles", is cremated by the Cremation Society at Woking Crematorium in Surrey.
- 31 March – The United Kingdom establishes a protectorate over Bechuanaland.
- 29 April – Women are permitted to take the University of Oxford entrance examination for the first time.
- 5 June – Niger River basin becomes a British protectorate.
- 8 June – Second defeat of the Gladstone ministry: William Ewart Gladstone's Liberal government is defeated in a vote of no confidence on the budget following criticism of the fall of Khartoum and violence in Ireland.
- 9 June – Gladstone resigns and Robert Cecil, Marquess of Salisbury forms a new Conservative government.
- 18 June – Clifton Hall Colliery disaster: an explosion kills 178 in Salford.
- 24 June – Lord Randolph Churchill becomes Secretary of State for India.
- 25 June – Redistribution of Seats Act changes apportionment of seats in the House of Commons.
- 26 June – John Everett Millais is granted a baronetcy, the first artist to accept a hereditary title (G. F. Watts refuses for a second time).
- 6–9 July – Eliza Armstrong case: Campaigning journalist W. T. Stead publishes a series of articles in the Pall Mall Gazette entitled "The Maiden Tribute of Modern Babylon" exposing the extent of female child prostitution in London.
- 20 July – The Football Association recognises professional players in England.
- 22 July – Caister Lifeboat capsizes: 8 of 15 crew are killed.
- 7 August – Criminal Law Amendment Act passes through Parliament, raising the age of consent from 13 to 16, and thereby outlawing child prostitution, leading to establishment this month of the National Vigilance Association "for the enforcement and improvement of the laws for the repression of criminal vice and public immorality". The Labouchere Amendment to the Act outlaws "gross indecency" between males.
- 12 September – In Association football:
  - Bury F.C., formed in a meeting between the Bury Wesleyans and Bury Unitarians Football Clubs, play at Gigg Lane for the first time, beating a Wigan team 4–3.
  - Arbroath 36–0 Bon Accord, the all-time largest margin of victory in professional football.
- 29 September – Opening of the Blackpool tramway, the first to be electrically powered.
- 30 September – A British force abolishes the Boer republic of Stellaland and adds it to British Bechuanaland.
- October – Third Burmese War begins.
- 3 October – Millwall F.C. is founded by workers on the Isle of Dogs in London as Millwall Rovers.
- 23 November – 1885 United Kingdom general election: Liberals under Gladstone hold the largest number of seats, but Salisbury remains Prime Minister with the support of the Irish Party.
- 28 November – British occupy Mandalay; Burma is annexed to British India.

=== Undated ===
- early – The first Rover safety bicycle, the first practical example of the modern bicycle, is demonstrated by John Kemp Starley of Coventry.
- A modern pedestal flush toilet is demonstrated by Frederick Humpherson of the Beaufort Works, Chelsea.
- The Soldiers' and Sailors' Families Association is established by James Gildea to provide charitable assistance.
- Soap manufacturer Lever Brothers is founded.
- Completion of Sway Tower in Hampshire, England, designed by Andrew Peterson using concrete made with Portland cement. It remains the world's tallest non-reinforced concrete structure.
- "Glasgow Boys" painters first exhibit collectively, at the Glasgow Institute of the Fine Arts.
- Stanhope Forbes' Newlyn School painting A Fish Sale on a Cornish Beach.

== Publications ==
- Richard Francis Burton's The Book of the Thousand Nights and a Night: A Plain and Literal Translation of the Arabian Nights Entertainments.
- Dictionary of National Biography begins publication under the editorship of Leslie Stephen.
- A. V. Dicey's text Introduction to the Study of the Law of the Constitution.
- H. Rider Haggard's novel King Solomon's Mines.
- George Meredith's novel Diana of the Crossways.
- Daniel Owen's long novel Hunangofiant Rhys Lewis, Gweinidog Bethel, the first written in Welsh.
- Walter Pater's novel Marius the Epicurean.
- Old Testament in the Revised Version of The Bible.
- The Lady, "a journal for gentlewomen", is first published (19 February).

== Births ==
- 21 January – Duncan Grant, painter (died 1978)
- 24 January – Marjory Stephenson, biochemist (died 1948)
- 25 January – William Wand, Bishop of London (died 1977)
- 26 January – Harry Ricardo, mechanical engineer (died 1974)
- 16 February – Will Fyffe, Scottish music hall entertainer (died 1947)
- 25 February – Princess Alice of Battenberg (died 1969)
- 7 March – John Tovey, admiral of the fleet (died 1971)
- 11 March – Malcolm Campbell, land and water racer (died 1948)
- 1 May – A. V. Alexander, politician (died 1965)
- 6 June – Roy Fedden, aircraft engine designer (died 1973)
- 9 June – John Edensor Littlewood, mathematician (died 1977)
- 22 June – James Maxton, Scottish socialist, leader of the Independent Labour Party (died 1946)
- 18 August – A. E. J. Collins, cricketer and soldier (died 1914)
- 11 September – D. H. Lawrence, novelist (died 1930)

== Deaths ==
- 26 January – Charles George Gordon, general (killed in battle) (born 1833)
- 1 February – Sidney Gilchrist Thomas, inventor (born 1850)
- 15 March – Jane Williams (Ysgafell), writer (born 1806)
- 18 March – Sir Thomas Bazley, 1st Baronet, industrialist and politician (born 1797)
- 20 March – Christopher Wordsworth, Anglican bishop and Biblical commentator (born 1807)
- 22 March – Sir Harry Parkes, diplomat (born 1828)
- 8 April – Susanna Moodie, writer on Canada (born 1803)
- 5 June – Sir Julius Benedict, composer and conductor (born 1804 in Germany)
- 12 June – Fleeming Jenkin, engineer (born 1833)
- 6 July – Henry Corry Rowley Becher, lawyer, politician and author (born 1817)
- 28 July – Sir Moses Montefiore, Jewish financier and philanthropist (born 1784 in Italy)
- 8 August – Charles Wood, 1st Viscount Halifax, politician (born 1800)
- 11 August – Richard Monckton Milnes, 1st Baron Houghton, man of letters and politician (born 1809)
- 30 August – Thomas Thornycroft, sculptor (born 1815)
- 1 October – Anthony Ashley-Cooper, 7th Earl of Shaftesbury, politician and philanthropist (born 1801)
- 9 October – John Bowes, art collector (born 1811)
- 26 November – Thomas Andrews, chemist (born 1813)
