= Cana Island =

Island in Lake Michigan in Door County, Wisconsin

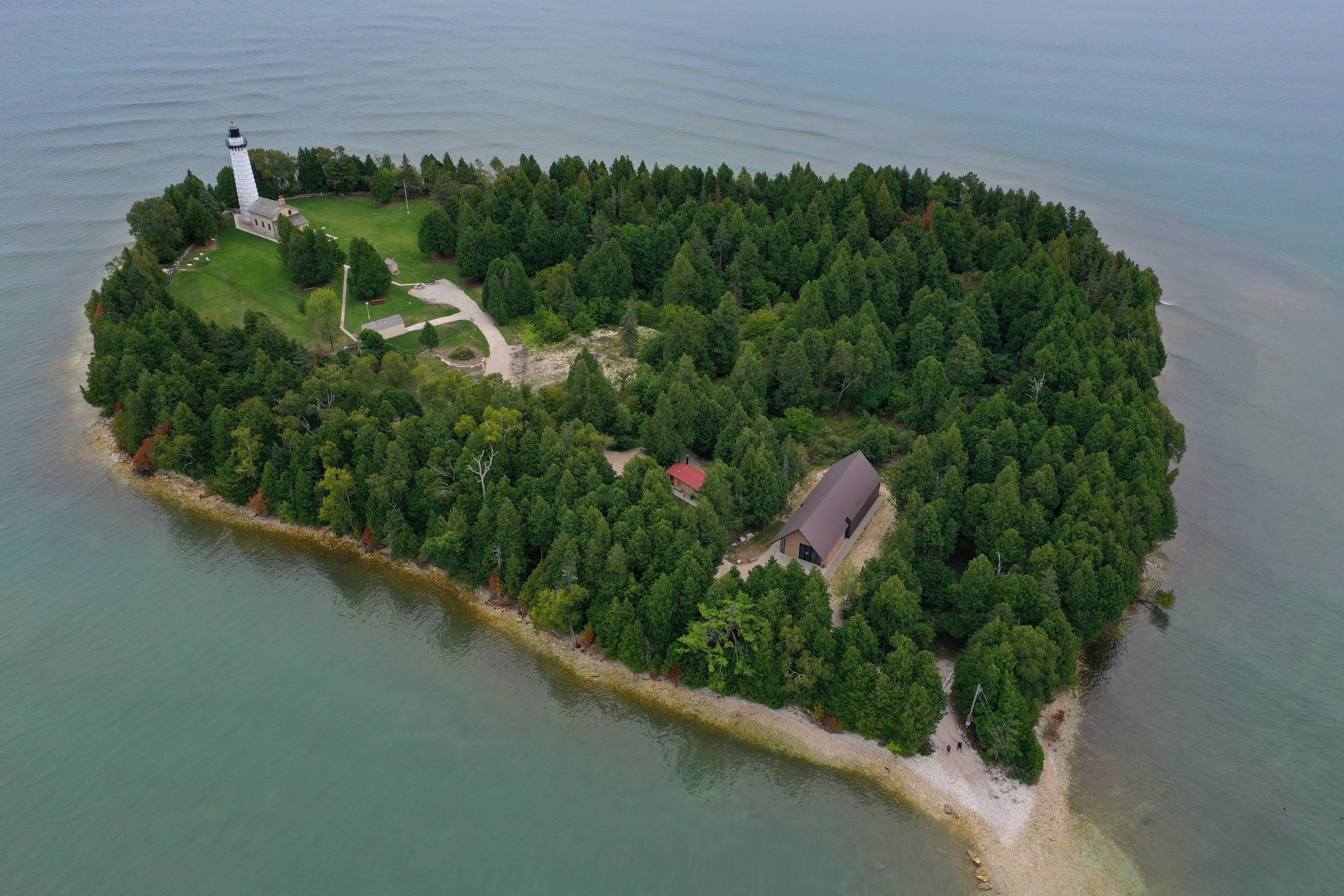

- Location within Wisconsin Location within the United States

Geography
- Location: Door County, Wisconsin
- Coordinates: 45°05′17″N 87°02′58″W
- Area: 8.7 acres (3.5 ha)
- Highest elevation: 581 ft (177.1 m)

Administration
- United States
- State: Wisconsin
- County: Door
- Town: Baileys Harbor

Cana Island is an island in Lake Michigan in the town of Baileys Harbor in Door County, Wisconsin, United States. The Cana Island Light is on the east side of the island. It is possible to walk to Cana Island from the mainland over the tombolo when water levels are low. Tombolo conditions are monitored by a webcam operated by the county parks department.

In 1896, the wooden bulk freighter Australasia burned and sank off Cana Island.

== Climate ==
Cana Cove, near Cana Island

Climate chart (precipitation, max. and min. temperature)
| J | F | M | A | M | J | J | A | S | O | N | D |
| 63 −4 −5 | 52 −6 −8 | 49 0 −3 | 97 3 1 | 86 7 3 | 91 14 9 | 105 15 14 | 96 18 17 | 96 16 15 | 107 10 6 | 80 4 4 | 57 3 −2 |
- █ Average max. and min. temperatures in °C
- █ Precipitation totals in mm
Imperial conversion
| J | F | M | A | M | J | J | A | S | O | N | D |
| 2.5 25 23 | 2 21 18 | 1.9 32 27 | 3.8 37 34 | 3.4 45 37 | 3.6 57 48 | 4.1 59 57 | 3.8 64 63 | 3.8 61 59 | 4.2 50 43 | 3.1 39 39 | 2.2 37 28 |
- █ Average max. and min. temperatures in °F
- █ Precipitation totals in inches
