= Dave Bennett (software) =

American software engineer

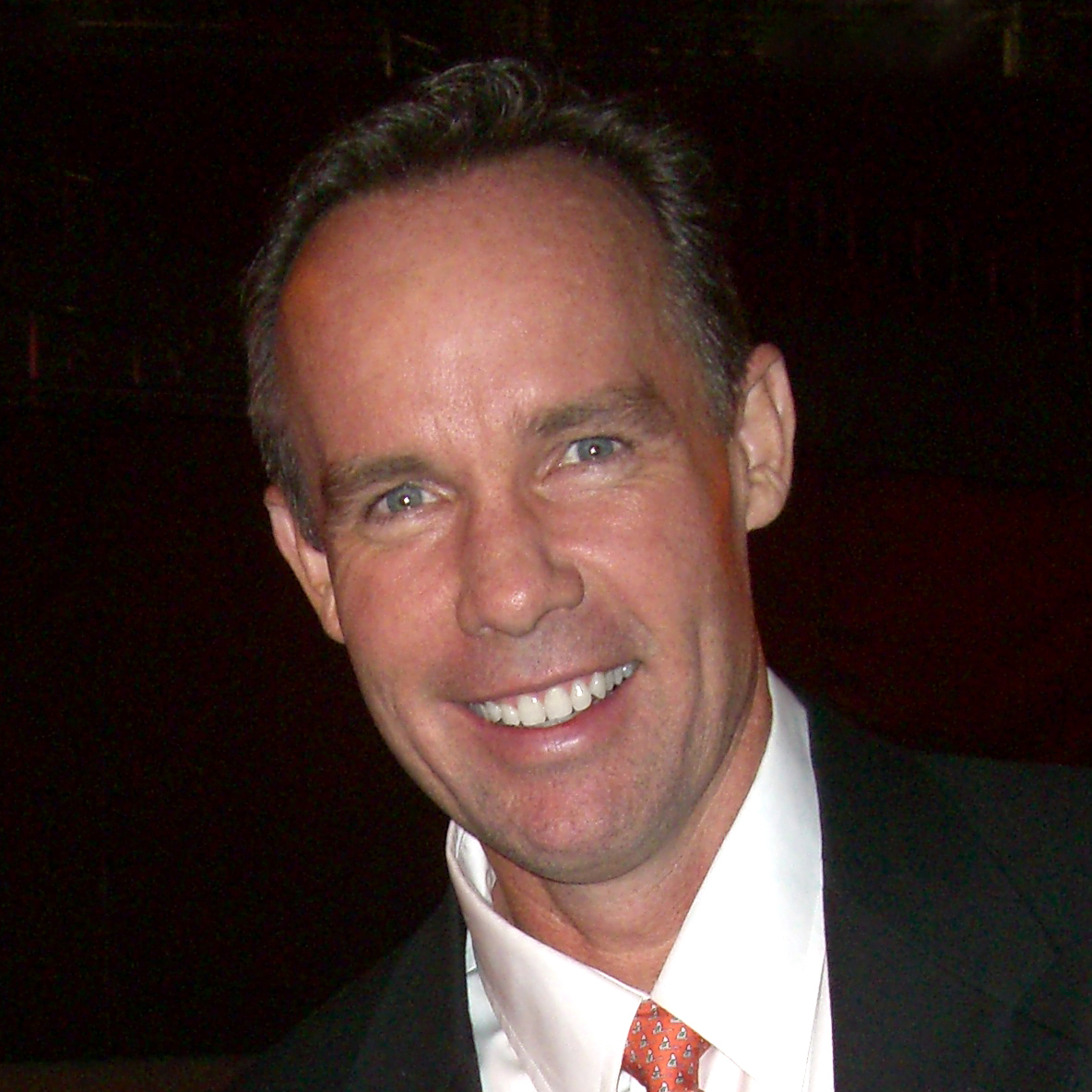
- Born: November 25, 1963
- Education: DeVry University
- Title: SVP, Integration
- Board member of: MIT Enterpris Forum

Dave Bennett (born November 25, 1963) is an American software engineer. Most recently, he was the CTO of Axway, as well as a board member of Axway NA.

== Education ==
Bennett graduated from DeVry Institute in 1985 with a BS in Computer Science.

== Career ==
Bennett started his career in Okinawa, Japan, as a software engineer at Bank of America, where he integrated several core banking systems using specialized communications protocols. In 1987, he was named Assistant Vice President, Regional Banks & Item Processing.

In 1989, Bennett joined Gateway Data Sciences, Inc., a startup in Tempe, Arizona, as the System Engineering Services Director. In 1992, he became the company's Engineering/Technical Executive and developed the first IP-based wireless receiving solution for supply chain execution and store receiving. After the company's IPO in 1996, Bennett founded B2B technology company Cyclone Commerce, Inc., where he served as the CTO.

In 2006, Axway acquired Cyclone Commerce, Inc. Bennett was named CTO and joined the board of Axway NA. In 2009, he joined the MIT Enterprise Forum Phoenix Board to support business development in Arizona. In 2011, Bennett assisted Axway in their initial public offering.

Bennett joined Orionhealth in 2013.
