= Becker Township, Minnesota =

Becker Township may refer to one of two municipalities in the U.S. state of Minnesota:

- Becker Township, Cass County, Minnesota
- Becker Township, Sherburne County, Minnesota

== See also ==
- Becker Township (disambiguation)
