= Cana Island Light =

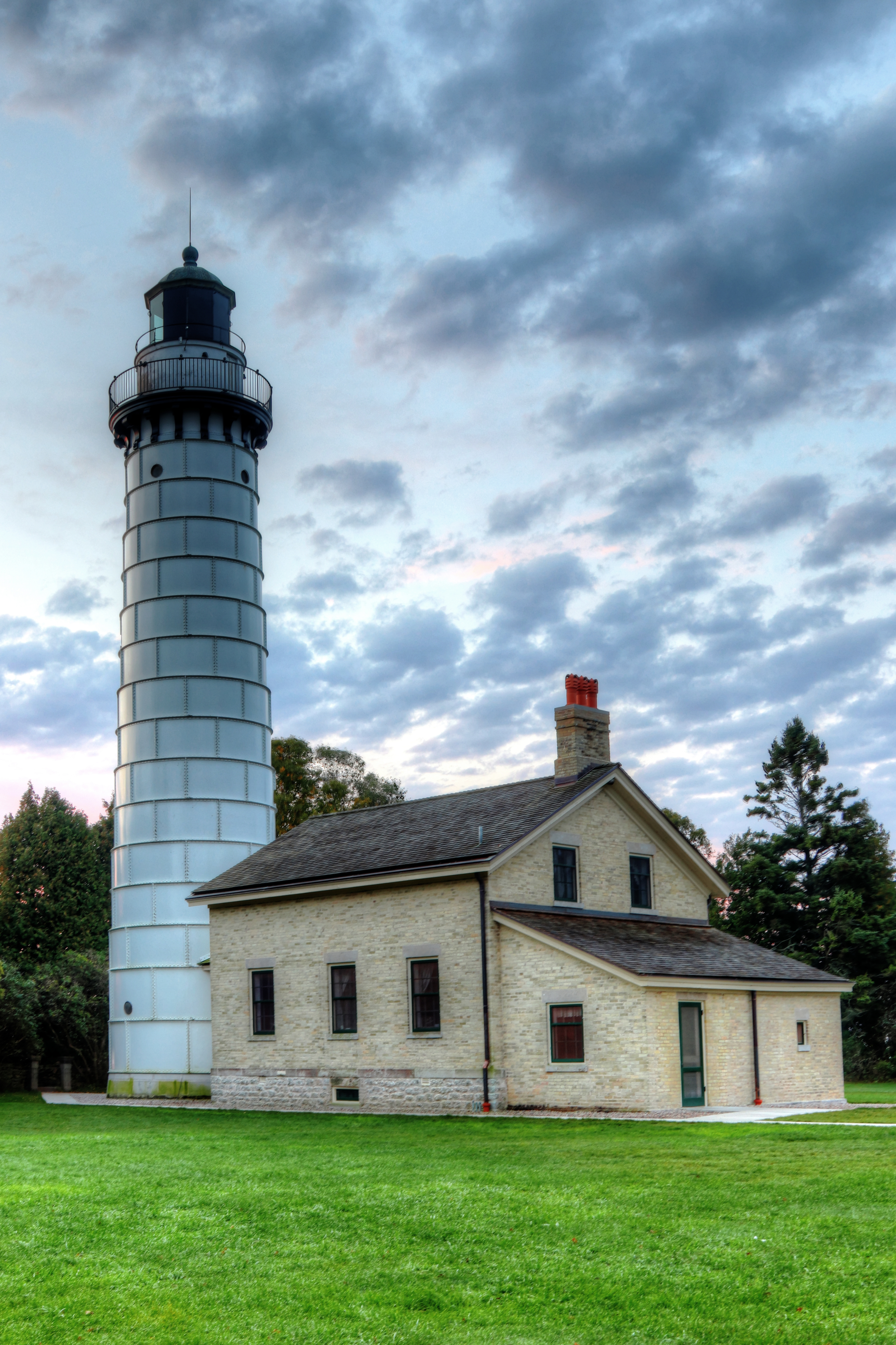
- Cana Island Light in October
- Location: Near Baileys Harbor, Wisconsin
- Coordinates: 45°05′17.234″N 87°02′51.515″W

Tower
- Constructed: 1869
- Foundation: Dressed stone
- Construction: Cream City brick enclosed by a steel shell in 1902
- Automated: 1945
- Height: 89 feet (27 m)
- Shape: cylindrical tower with balcony and lantern
- Operator: Door County Maritime Museum
- Heritage: National Register of Historic Places listed place

Light
- First lit: 1870
- Focal height: 27 m (89 ft)
- Lens: Third order Fresnel lens
- Range: 17 nautical miles (31 km; 20 mi)
- Characteristic: F W
- Cana Island Lighthouse
- U.S. National Register of Historic Places
- Nearest city: Baileys Harbor, Wisconsin
- Area: 1.5 acres (0.61 ha)
- NRHP reference No.: 76000201
- Added to NRHP: November 21, 1976

The Cana Island lighthouse is a lighthouse located just north of Baileys Harbor in Door County, Wisconsin, United States.

Along with the Baileys Harbor Range Lights, the lighthouse was built to replace the Baileys Harbor Lighthouse in 1869 and was first lit in 1870. It is still used as an active navigational aid under the jurisdiction of the United States Coast Guard, and was added to the National Register of Historic Places in 1976.

Since the 1970s, both the lighthouse and its keeper's quarters are open for visitors to tour by means of the Door County Maritime Museum.

On August 9th, 2025, the island was hit by a storm and suffered severe damage, with around 30% of the island's trees being lost.

== History ==
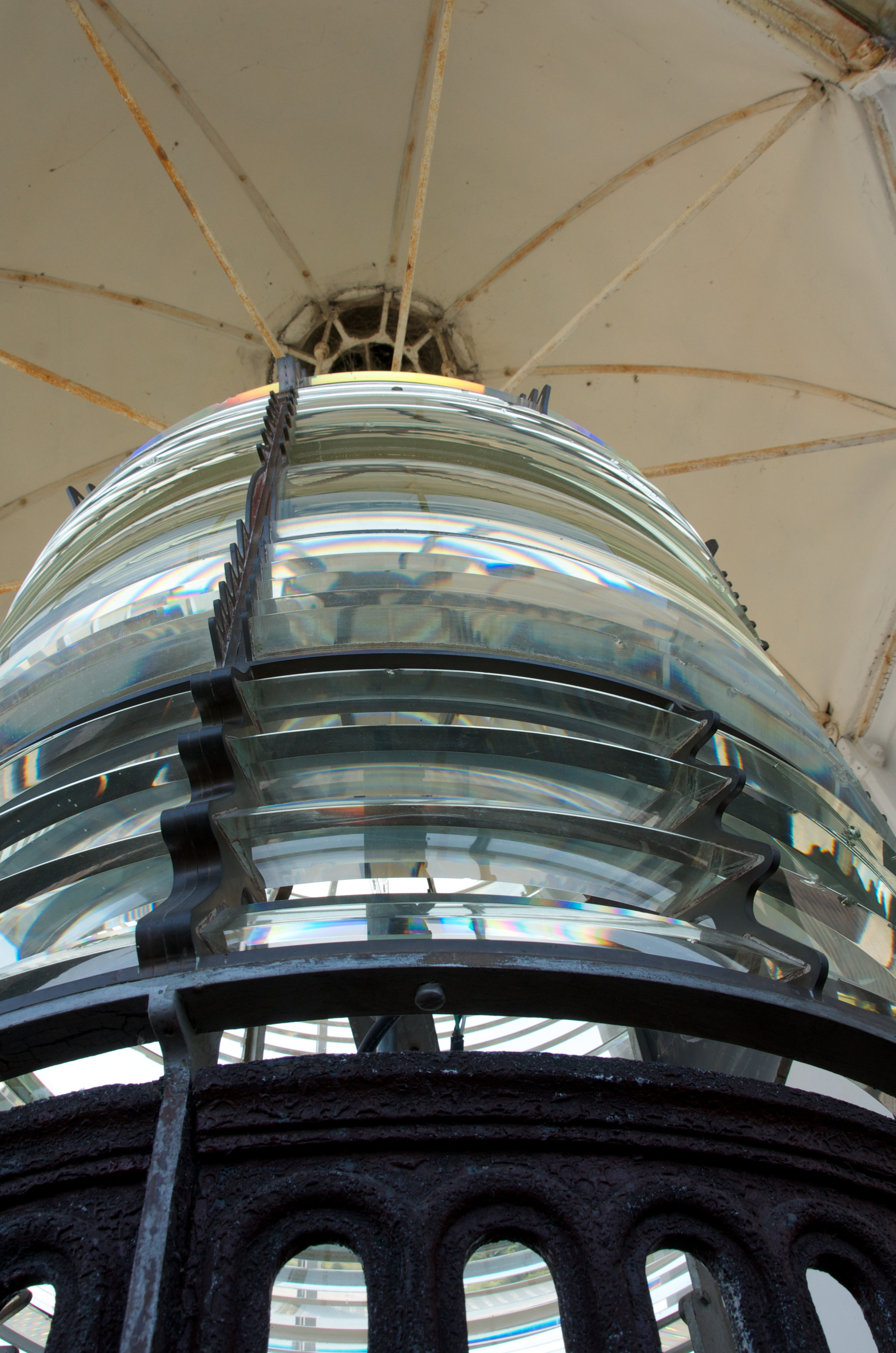
The Fresnel lens, made in France

The keeper's quarters, privy, and tower were the first buildings and were made of cream city brick, but the brick of the tower deteriorated quickly because of storms and icy winters. In 1902, a steel cladding was added to the tower to protect it from further deterioration. The cost of the quarters, tower and cladding was $12,793.

The light itself is a third order Fresnel lens. It used to be fueled by lard, later it was fueled by kerosene, then by acetylene, and now by electricity. The round ball at the top is the vent that removed the smoke and soot from the oil lamp. Each night oil had to be carried to the top of the tower by the keeper or his assistant to keep the light fueled. When the light first became electric in 1945, it was by an engine driven, 2 kW generator, and batteries that powered the 100 watt, 32 volt bulb. A powerline was finally installed in the 1960s, and the bulb was switched to a 110 volt, 200 watt bulb. Four bulbs are mounted in a rack that allows for the next bulb to light if the one before it burns out.

An hexagon-shaped oil house, storage building and privy are also located at the site. An oil tank had been in the woods to the south of the building and a pipe underground moved the oil to the building.

The lighthouse is located on the 8.7-acre (3.5 ha) Cana Island connected to the mainland via a rocky channel. Depending on the lake level the channel can be covered with 1–3 feet of cold Lake Michigan water. Originally, only wood walkways on top of rocks and a little dirt covered the area around the buildings. But starting in 1900, top soil was hauled in by a crew of men with eight teams of horses and wagons. Six weeks later they were ready to begin covering the area with grass. There is a stone sea wall on the east end of the island.

Before 1889, the first assistants were spouses or family members. Patrick Chambers was the first non-family member assistant. When electricity came to the island an assistant was no longer needed.

The tower is 89 feet (27 m) tall in all. 79 feet 3 inches (24.16 m) from ground level to focal plane of the light. The light is approximately 85 feet (26 m) above water level, and has a visual range of 17 nautical miles (31 km; 20 mi). The stone foundation goes below ground 4 feet (1.2 m) and is set on bedrock. The tower is 4 feet 8 inches (1.42 m) thick at the base with the outer layer 24 inches (610 mm) thick with a 20-inch (510 mm) air space between it and the 12-inch (300 mm) inner layer of brick at the base. Ten feet from the top it narrows to a 16-inch (410 mm) thickness with a 4-inch (100 mm) airspace and 8-inch (200 mm) inner layer. There are 102 cast iron steps in the circular staircase leading to the watch room.

On October 15, 1880 a terrible storm called the Big Blow of 1880 destroyed seven ships near this lighthouse, and on October 12, 1928, the freighter M.J. Bartelme went aground in the fog at this location after attempts to free the ship failed.

== Keepers ==
- William Jackson 1869-1872 (first keeper)
- Julius Warren 1872-1875
- William Sanderson 1875-1891
- Jesse T. Brown 1891-1913
- Conrad A. Stram 1913-1918
- Oscar R. Knudsen 1918-1924
- Michael Drezdon 1941-1945
- Rosie and Louie Janda 1977-1995

== Gallery ==
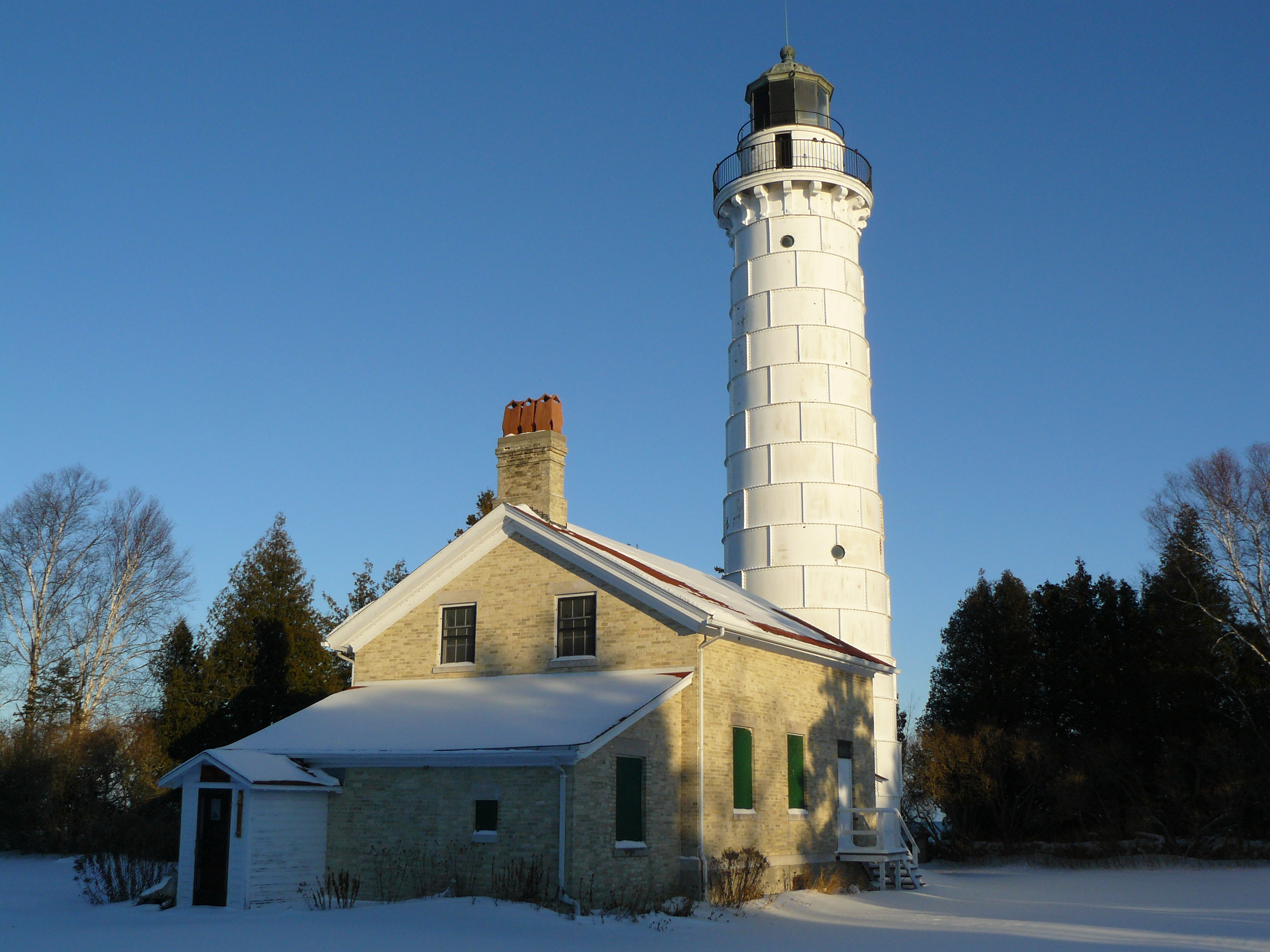
Lighthouse in December

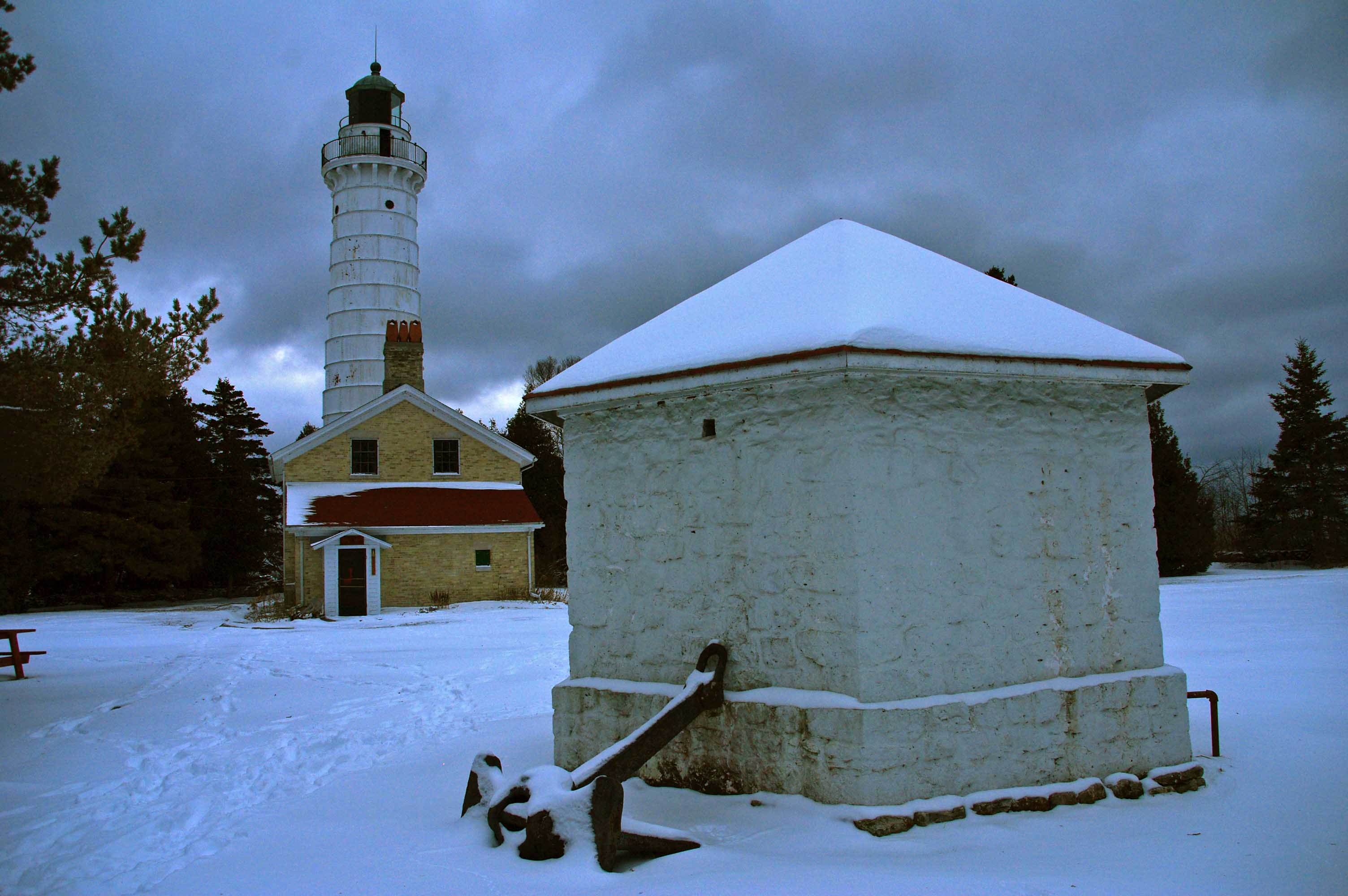
Lighthouse and oil house in February

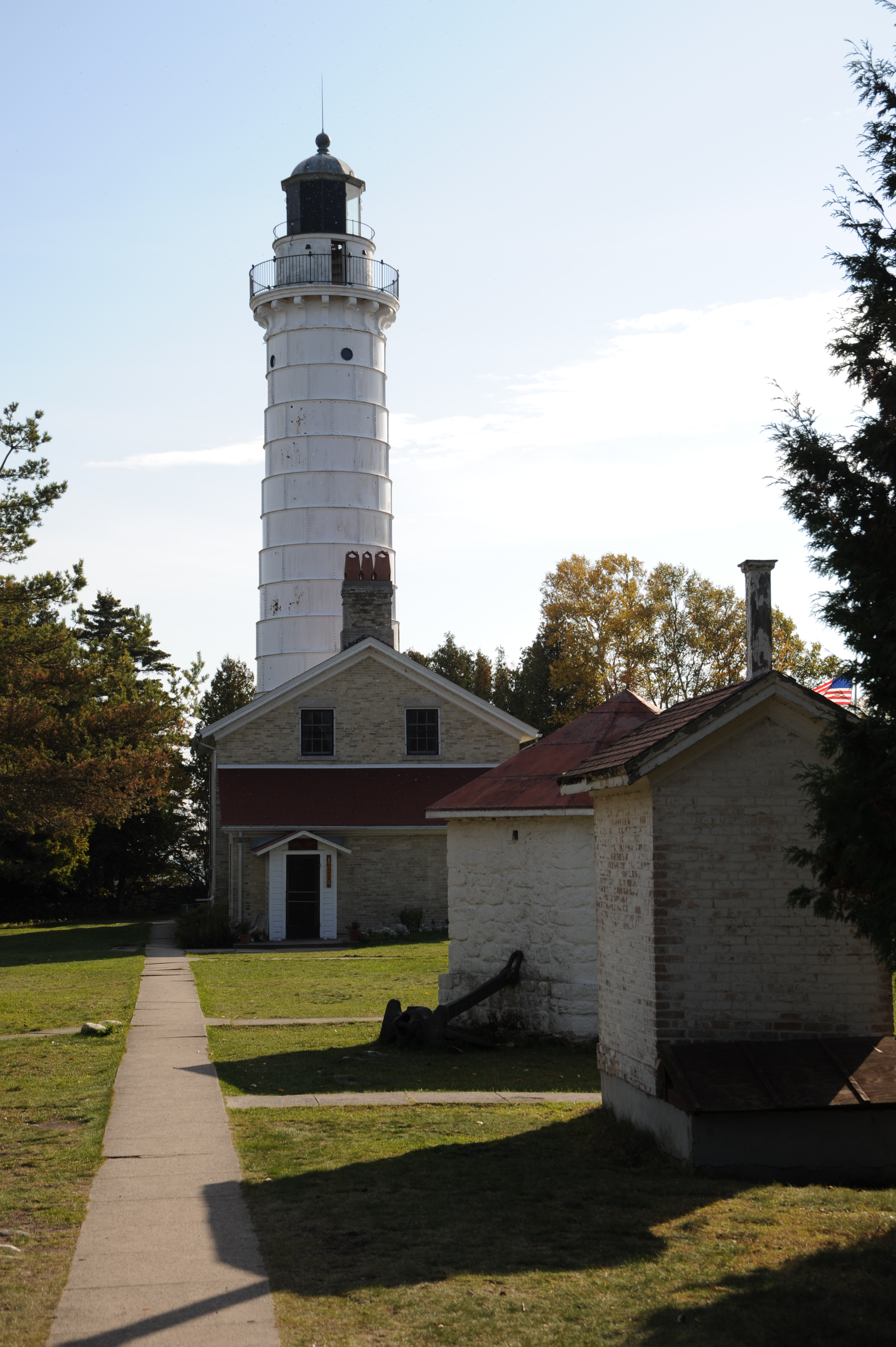
The privy is at the far right; taken in October

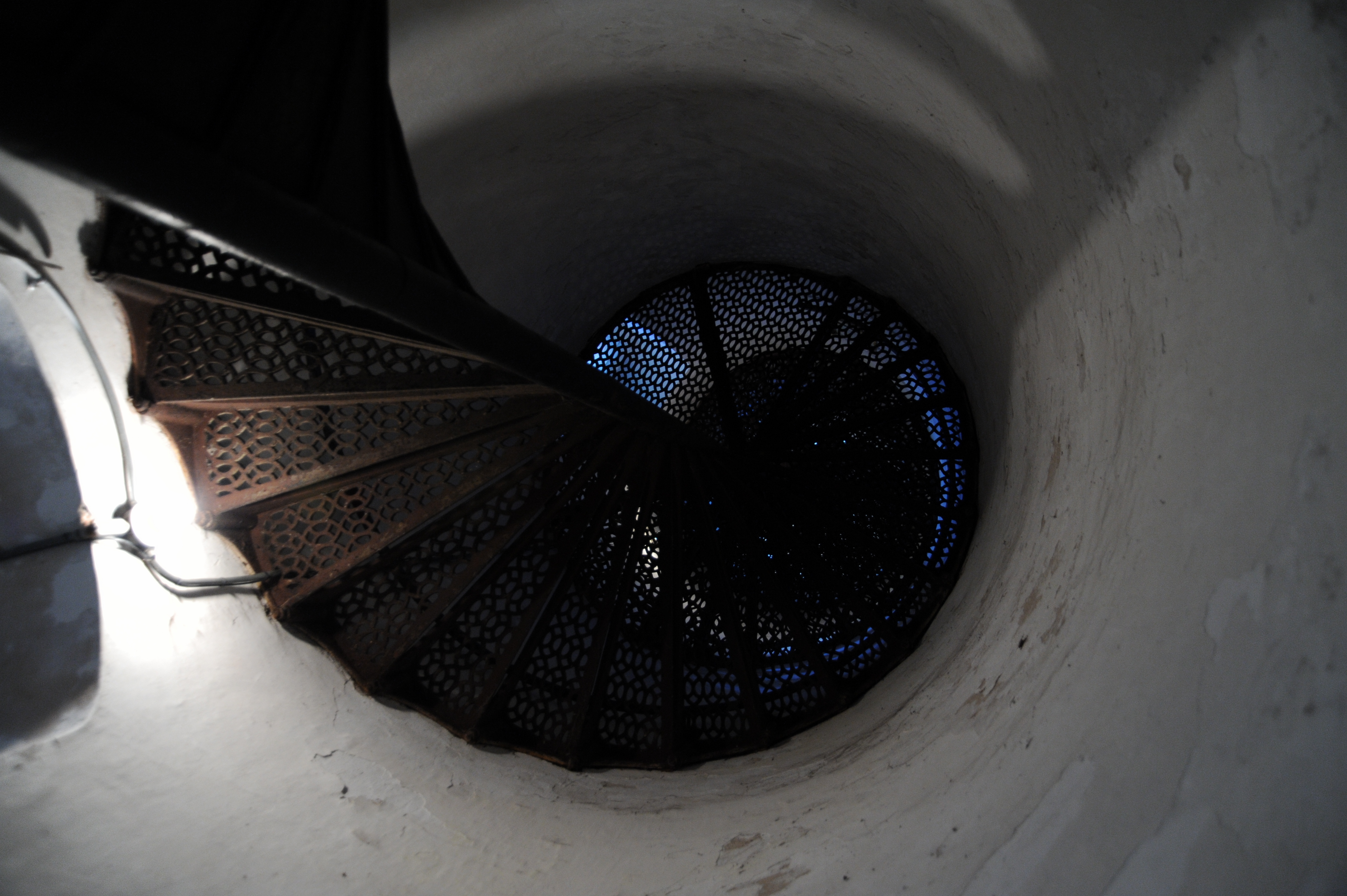
Stairs in the tower

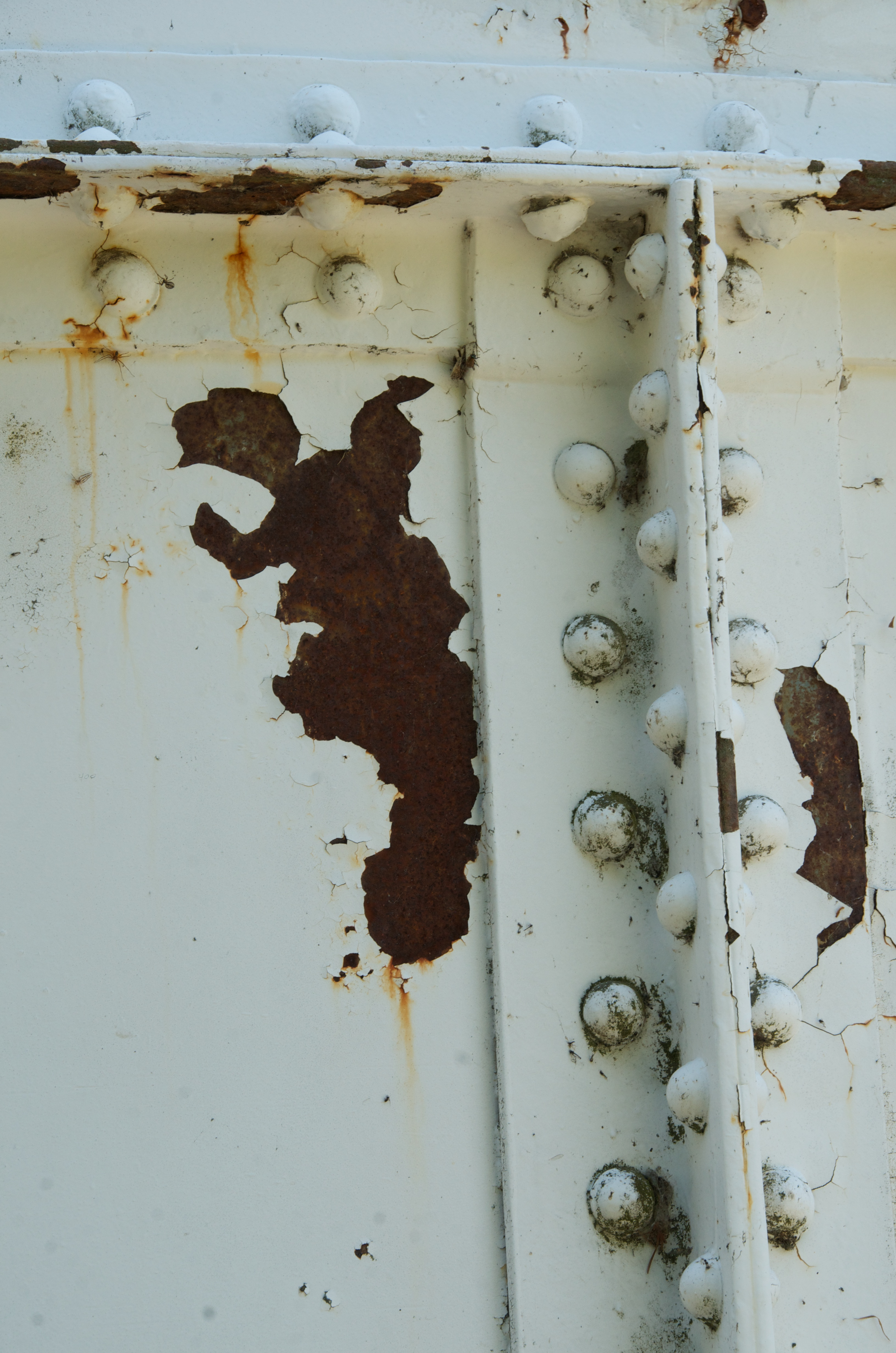
Iron plating on the tower

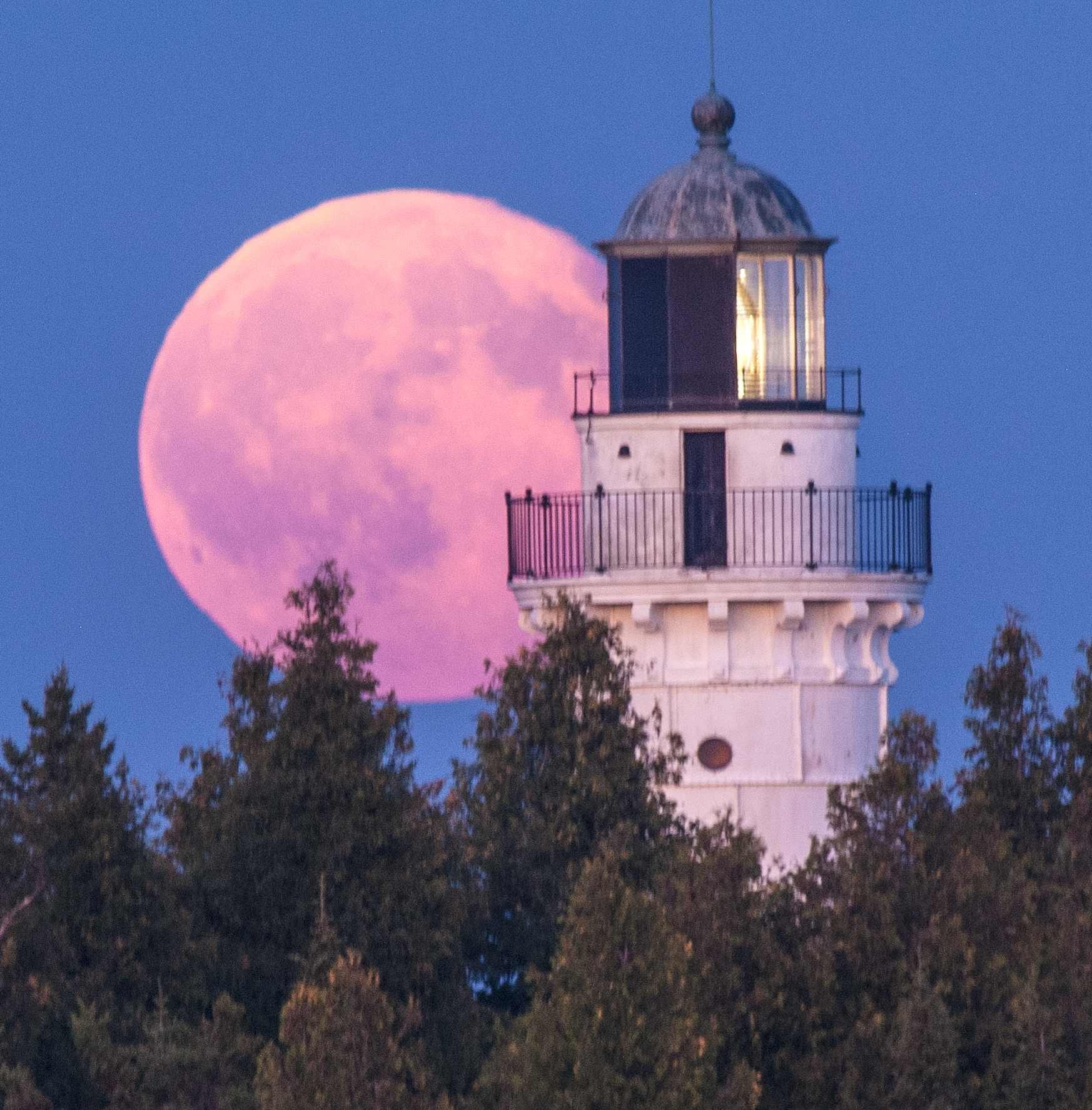
A lit beacon

Lighthouse diagrams

Tower diagram

Oil house diagrams

Privy diagrams

Residence diagrams and light diagrams

Shed diagrams
