= Door County Maritime Museum =

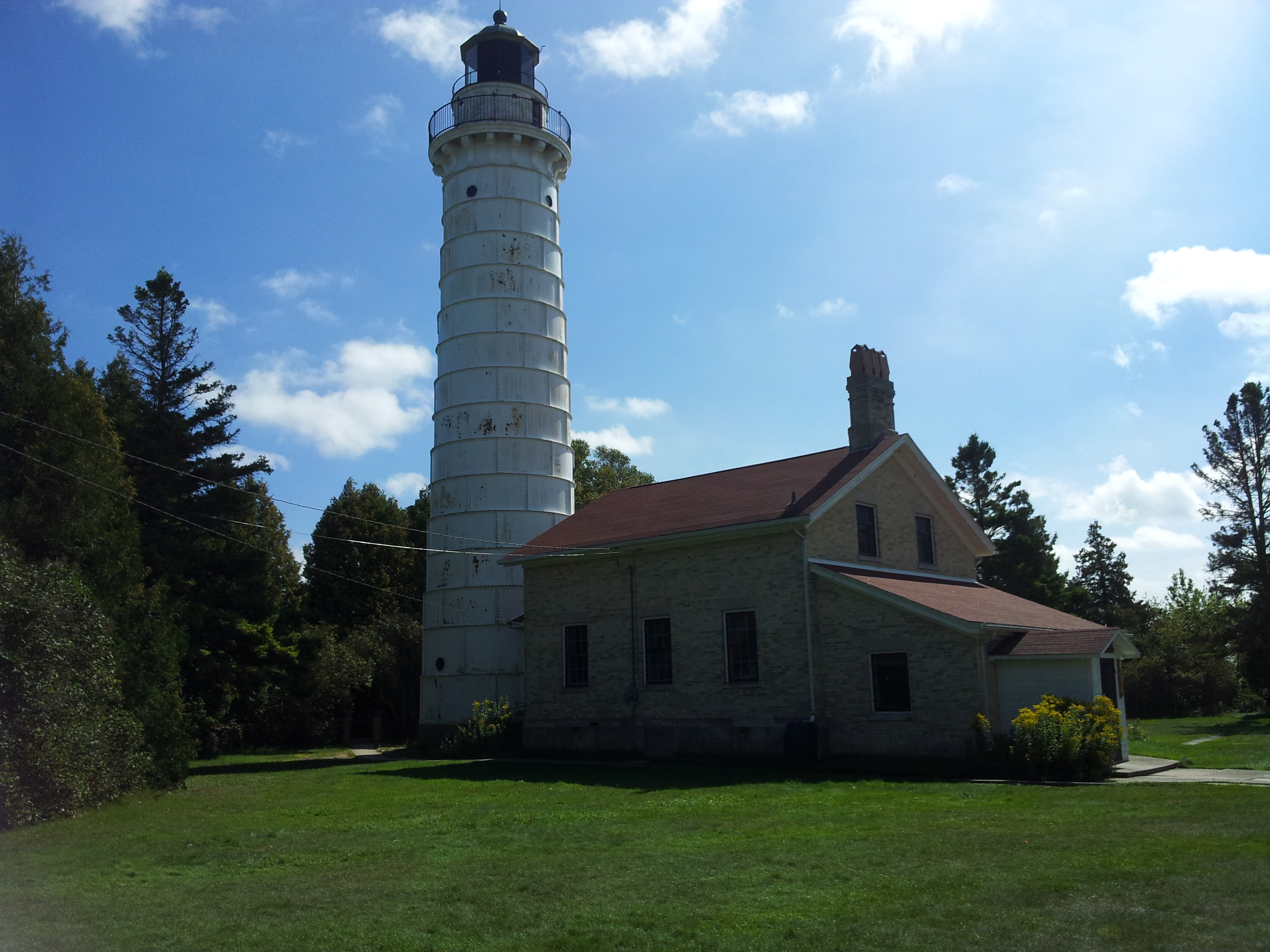
- Cana Island Light which is owned by the County of Door, and operated by DCMM
- Established: 1969
- Location: 120 North Madison Avenue, Sturgeon Bay, Wisconsin
- Coordinates: 44.8303°N 87.3829°W
- Type: Maritime museum
- Visitors: 65,000
- Director: Kevin Osgood
- President: Terry Connelly
- Curator: Rhys Kuzdas
- Website: www.dcmm.org

The Door County Maritime Museum is an American maritime museum located in Sturgeon Bay, Wisconsin, with additional sites in Gills Rock, Wisconsin, and the Cana Island Light.

== History ==
The museum was founded in Gills Rock, Wisconsin, in 1969 and began operating at the Cana Island Light in 1971. The Gills Rock location was opened in 1975.

In 1993, the museum began a capital campaign to build a year-round facility in Sturgeon Bay, which was accomplished in 1997.

In 2015, the museum began another capital campaign to expand their Sturgeon Bay museum with the construction of a 10-story lighthouse tower, which will contain exhibit space and an observation deck. Construction of the Maritime Lighthouse Tower will be completed in November 2020; the facility will open to the public in May 2021.

== Sites ==
=== Door County Maritime Museum (Sturgeon Bay site) ===
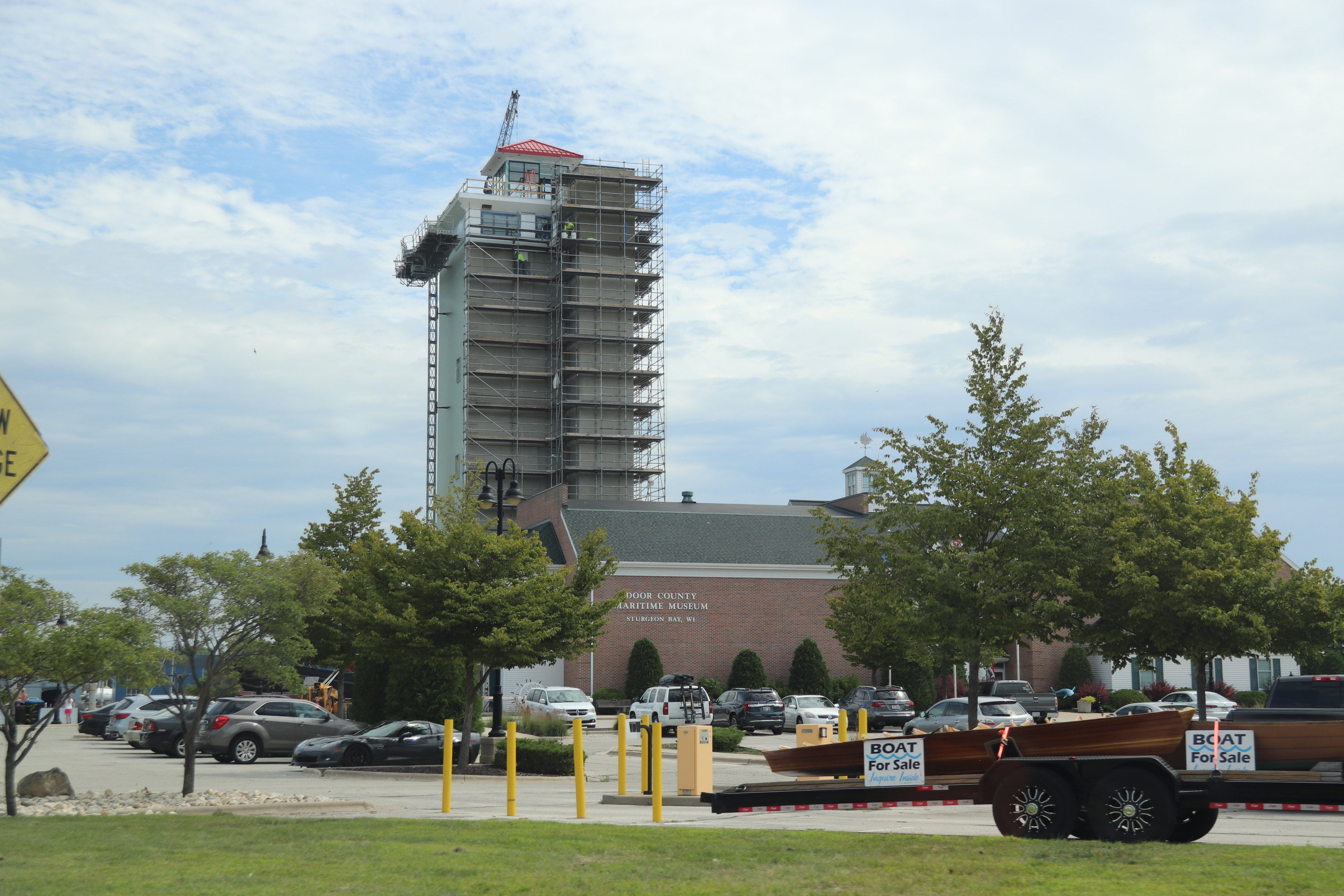
Construction at the Sturgeon Bay site in August 2020

The main Door County Maritime Museum site was opened in 1997. It contains the museum's offices, as well as its main exhibits. The site also hosts the tugboat John Purves, which was built in 1919, served the U.S. Army in World War II, and later sailed on the Great Lakes. The site also hosts CG-41410, which was the last 41-foot Utility Boat, Large in active service with the U.S. Coast Guard.

In 2019, the museum began an effort to add an addition onto the museum, including a lighthouse tower. Exterior construction was finished by November 5, with the Jim Kress Lighthouse Tower becoming Sturgeon Bay's tallest building.

=== Deaths Door Maritime Museum (Gills Rock site) ===
The Gills Rock site opened in 1975. It contains exhibits that focus on the commercial fishing industry and pirates on the Great Lakes. The site also hosts a 45-foot wooden fishing boat, which was built in 1930. The site is open seasonally from May to October. Prior to 2018, it was named as the other Door County Maritime Museum and is still referenced today.

=== Cana Island Lighthouse ===
The Cana Island Lighthouse (aka Cana Island Light) was constructed in 1869 and opened as a museum site in 1971. It is located near Baileys Harbor, Wisconsin. Access to the island is via a causeway. After the winter of 2015–16, heavy snow, rain, and decreased evaporation caused Lakes Michigan and Huron to rise 30+ inches; that summer the causeway was occasionally covered by water, so the Museum purchased a tractor and wagon to take visitors to the lighthouse when the causeway was covered with water. Summers of 2017 and 2018, the causeway was always covered. Volunteers drive the tractor.

The lighthouse keeper's residence has been restored and is a museum depicting life for a lighthouse family.

Restoration as of summer 2018:
Phase 1 has been completed and included new restroom facilities and a maintenance building; a parking lot; repair to the copper roof; repainting of the tower; repaired masonry on the tower and keeper's house; restoration of windows and doors; and many other updates.
Phase 2 was completed in 2017 and included restoring the out buildings including the oil house, privy and barn.
Phase 3 is scheduled for late 2018/early 2019 and includes construction of a visitor center to replace the temporary building.
Phase 4 is scheduled to start after Phase 3 fundraising and construction are complete. Phase 4 will restore the interior of the keeper's house ($1,000,000). The 89-foot light tower is also open for tours.

== See also ==
- Wisconsin Maritime Museum, another Maritime Museum, located south in Manitowoc, Wisconsin
- List of maritime museums in the United States
