= Herman A. DeVry =

American inventor (1876–1941)

Herman Adolf DeVry (November 26, 1876 – March 23, 1941) was an American inventor, aviator, and colleague of Lee de Forest. DeVry is credited with creating the first portable motion picture projector, which he called a Theatre in a Suitcase. He was the founder of the DeVry Company.

== Early life ==
Herman Adolf DeVry was born on November 26, 1876, in Mecklenburg, Germany. He was the son of Wilhelm Heinrich DeVry and Kunigunde (born Steuwe). Herman and his family immigrated to the United States in 1886, when he was 10 years old. His father worked as a common laborer, but DeVry wanted to do more with his life. He became interested in photography and film at an early age, an obsession that would continue throughout the rest of his life.

== Career and Invention ==
He began working at a penny arcade, where the owner had a brand new Lumiere motion picture camera. He traveled through the American West and held a variety of jobs related to film, including working at a movie theater in Omaha, Nebraska, where he showed The Battle of Manila by Thomas Edison during the Trans-Mississippi Exposition of 1898. Throughout this time, he was interested in reducing the size of the film projection equipment he worked with.

In 1910, he began working as a cameraman for the Industrial Film Company, owned by Watterson Rothacker, in Chicago, Illinois. Two years later, DeVry had developed a new type of 35mm film projector which could be carried in its own small suitcase. The original hand-built prototype portable projector is today on display at the Smithsonian. By 1919, DeVry had risen through the ranks to control the Industrial Film Company, and he changed the company's name—the DeVry company was born.

DeVry was convinced that motion picture was not only entertainment, but that it could also be useful in education. The American government bought many of these during World War I. The company sold over 50,000 Type E projectors to schools and also created and distributed educational films, earning him the nickname The Father of Visual Education.

He established the DeVry Summer School of Visual Instruction in 1925, attracting teachers from all over the nation; he also produced educational films. In 1931, DeVry and colleague Lee de Forest founded the De Forest Training School in Chicago, which eventually became DeVry University in 1995. During World War II, the school was used to train flight technicians.

== Personal life ==
At a dance in 1898, Herman and his brother Wilhelm fell in love with the same woman—Ida Shoellkopf, the daughter of a Chicago merchant. Ida married Wilhelm in May 1898; they had three children, Emma, Edward, and William. Herman was heartbroken and did not see Ida until 1910, when Wilhelm had died. DeVry courted his brother's widow, and they married in 1916. William and Edward continued DeVry's work in electronic training systems.

DeVry died in 1941 in Chicago, Illinois.
