= USS Cobia =

Submarine of the United States

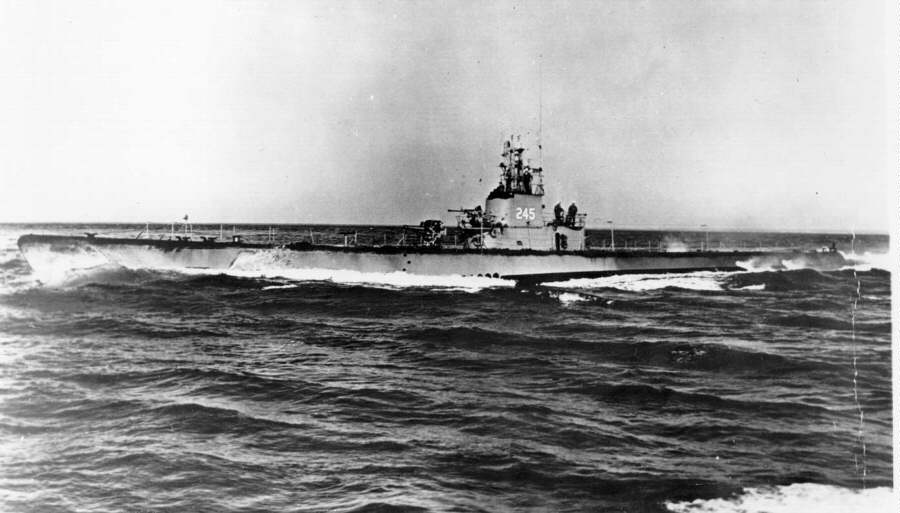
- USS Cobia (SS-245)

History

United States
- Namesake: Cobia
- Ordered: 9 September 1940
- Builder: Electric Boat Company, Groton, Connecticut
- Laid down: 17 March 1943
- Launched: 28 November 1943
- Sponsored by: Mrs. C. W. Magruder
- Commissioned: 29 March 1944
- Decommissioned: 22 May 1946
- Recommissioned: 6 July 1951
- Decommissioned: 19 March 1954
- Stricken: 1 July 1970
- Status: Memorial at Manitowoc, Wisconsin, 17 August 1970
- Badge

General characteristics
- Class & type: Gato-class diesel-electric submarine
- Displacement: 1,490 long tons (1,514 t) surfaced; 2,070 long tons (2,103 t) submerged
- Length: 311 ft 9 in (95.02 m)
- Beam: 27 ft 3 in (8.31 m)
- Draft: 17 ft (5.2 m) maximum
- Propulsion: 4 × General Motors Model 16-248 V16 Diesel engines driving electric generators; 2 × 126-cell Sargo batteries; 4 × high-speed General Electric electric motors with reduction gears; two propellers; 5,400 shp (4.0 MW) surfaced; 2,740 shp (2.0 MW) submerged
- Speed: 21 kn (39 km/h) surfaced; 9 kn (17 km/h) submerged
- Range: 11,000 nmi (20,000 km) surfaced at 10 kn (19 km/h)
- Endurance: 48 hours at 2 kn (4 km/h) submerged; 75 days on patrol
- Test depth: 300 ft (90 m)
- Complement: 10 officers, 70 enlisted
- Armament: 10 × 21-inch (533 mm) torpedo tubes; 6 forward, 4 aft; 24 torpedoes; 1 × 3-inch (76 mm) / 50 caliber deck gun; Bofors 40 mm and Oerlikon 20 mm cannon
- USS Cobia (submarine)
- U.S. National Register of Historic Places
- U.S. National Historic Landmark
- Location within Wisconsin Location within the United States
- Location: Manitowoc, Wisconsin
- Coordinates: 44°5′33″N 87°39′20″W
- Built: 1943
- Architect: Electric Boat Co.
- NRHP reference No.: 86000087

Significant dates
- Added to NRHP: 14 January 1986
- Designated NHL: 14 January 1986

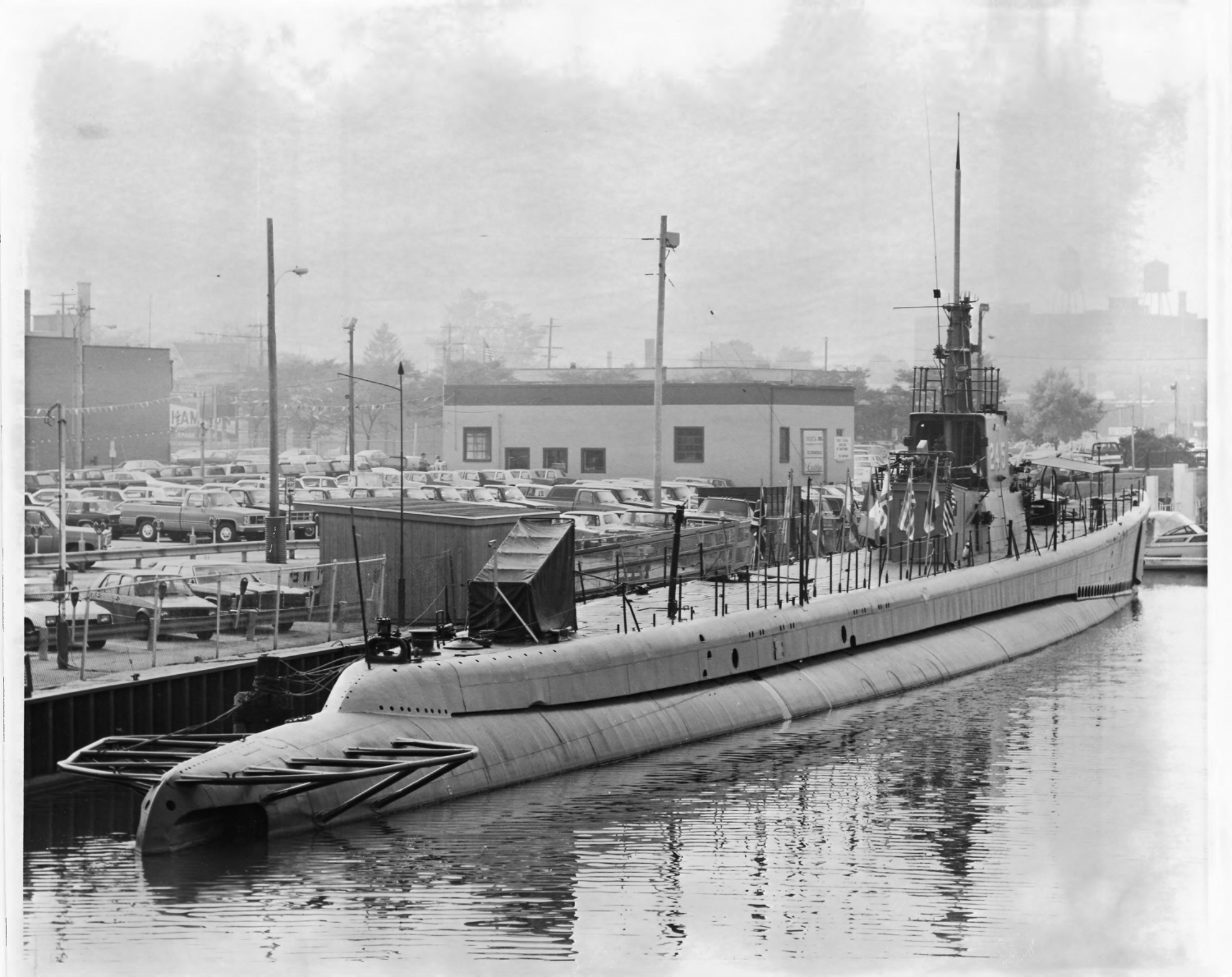
USS Cobia exterior view in 1984.

USS Cobia (SS/AGSS-245) is a Gato-class submarine, formerly of the United States Navy, named for the cobia.

Cobia was designated a National Historic Landmark for her service in World War II, which included service in the Pacific, where she earned four battle stars. She is now a museum ship at the Wisconsin Maritime Museum in Manitowoc, Wisconsin.

== Construction and commissioning ==
Cobia was laid down on 17 March 1943 by the Electric Boat Company at Groton, Connecticut. She was launched on 28 November 1943, sponsored by Mrs. C. W. Magruder, and commissioned on 29 March 1944, Lieutenant Commander Albert L. Becker in command.

== World War II ==
=== First patrol ===
Cobia reached Pearl Harbor from New London 3 June 1944. On 26 June, she put to sea on her first war patrol, bound for the Bonin Islands. On 13 July, 17 July, and 18 July she sank Japanese freighters. The last, Nisshu Maru, was a troop transport carrying a Japanese tank regiment to Iwo Jima. Even though casualties were low in the 26th Tank Regiment, all of the regiment's 28 tanks went to the bottom of the sea. It would be December before 22 replacements were provided.

On 20 July Cobia sank three small armed ships in a running gun battle. One of them rammed Cobia, causing minor damage, but the submarine continued her mission, sinking a converted yacht of 500 tons on 5 August. A survivor from the yacht was rescued as Cobia's first prisoner of war.

=== Second and third patrols ===
After refitting at Majuro from 14 August to 6 September 1944, Cobia sailed into the Luzon Strait for her second war patrol, a mission frequently punctuated by attacks by Japanese aircraft. On 22 October, the sub rescued two survivors of a Japanese ship previously sunk by another American submarine. Cobia put into Fremantle for refit 5 November, and cleared that harbor on her third war patrol 30 November. Sailing into the South China Sea, she reconnoitered off Balabac Strait between 12 December and 8 January 1945, and on 14 January sank the minelayer Yurishima off the southeast coast of Malaya. Surfacing to photograph her sinking victim, Cobia was driven under by a Japanese bomber. Next day she rescued two Japanese from a raft on which they had been adrift 40 days.

=== Fourth patrol ===
Once more she refitted at Fremantle (between 24 January and 18 February), then sailed to the Java Sea for her fourth war patrol. On 26 February she engaged two "sea trucks". One of the targets resisted with machine gun fire which damaged Cobia's radar equipment and killed Ralph Clark Huston Jr., a 20 mm gun loader and the submarine's only casualty of the war. After sinking both sea trucks, Cobia interrupted her patrol for repairs at Fremantle from 4–8 March, then returned to the Java Sea, where on 8 April she rescued seven surviving crewmembers of a downed Army bomber. One of the crewmembers, Jean Vandruff, recounted the story of the rescue in his autobiography.

=== Fifth and sixth patrols ===
Cobia replenished at Subic Bay from 15 April to 9 May 1945, then put out for the Gulf of Siam and her fifth war patrol. On 14 May she attacked a cargo ship, but was driven deep by depth charges hurled by minelayer Hatsutaka. Her luck changed for the better on 8 June, when Cobia contacted a tanker convoy, and sank both a tanker and the landing craft Hakusa. She refitted once more at Fremantle between 18 June and 18 July, then sailed for her sixth and final war patrol. After landing intelligence teams along the coast of Java on 27 July, Cobia sailed to act as lifeguard during air strikes on Formosa until the end of hostilities, returning to Saipan 22 August.

Of Cobia's six war patrols, the first, third, fourth, and fifth were designated as "successful" war patrols, for which she received four battle stars. She was credited with having sunk a total of 16,835 tons of shipping.

== Post-war service ==
Cobia sailed on for Pearl Harbor, New York, Washington, and New London, where she was decommissioned and placed in reserve 22 May 1946. Recommissioned 6 July 1951, Cobia trained reservists and Submarine School students at New London until placed in commission in reserve at the Portsmouth Naval Shipyard 29 October 1953. After overhaul, she was towed to New London, where she was again placed out of commission in reserve in the Atlantic Reserve Fleet 19 March 1954.

By 1959, the Navy considered Cobia obsolete as a deployable warship and transferred her to the Milwaukee, Wisconsin Naval Reserve Center. There she served as a training platform for the next eleven years. She was redesignated an Auxiliary Submarine, AGSS-245, 1 December 1962.

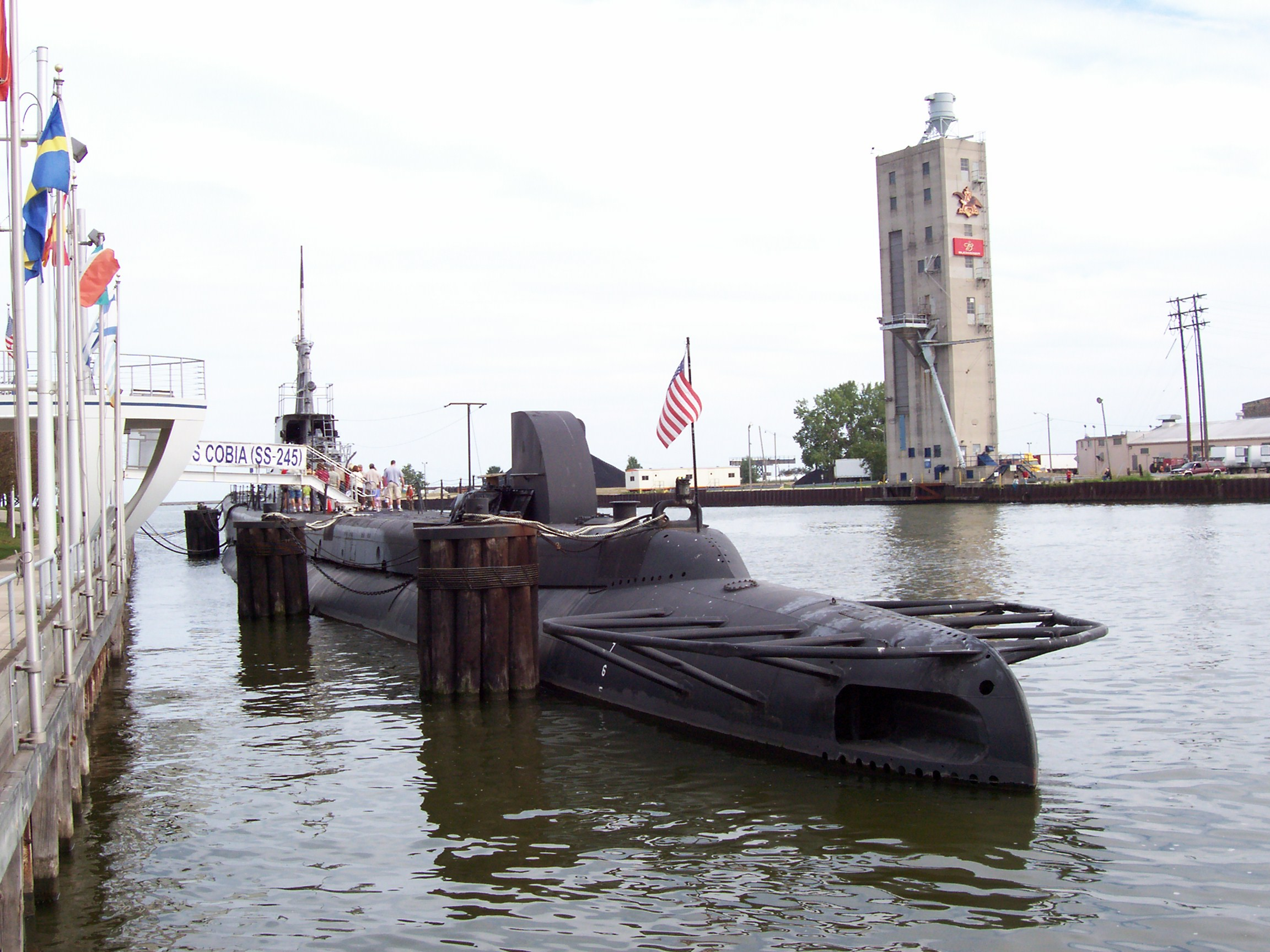
USS Cobia in 2006

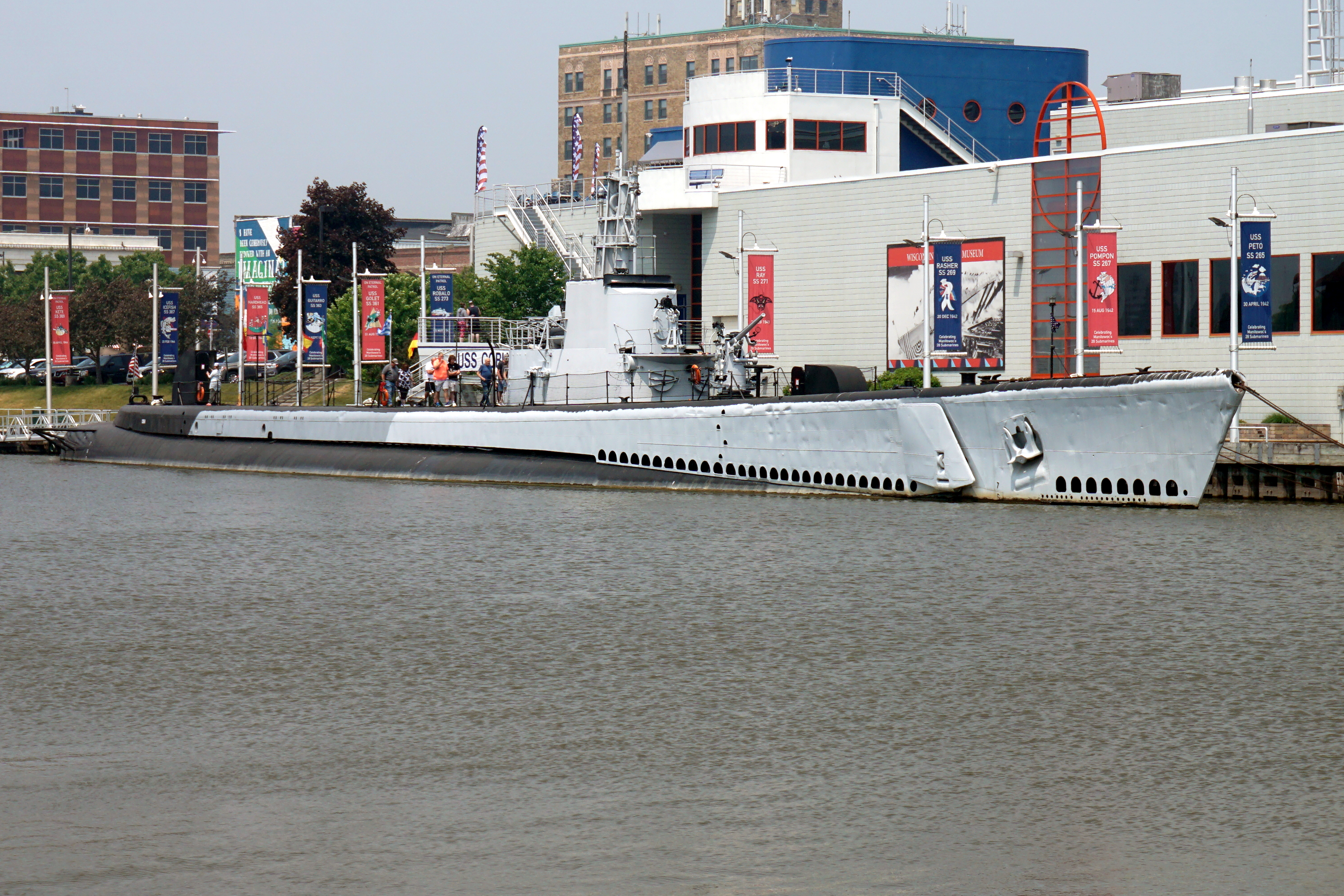
USS Cobia at the Wisconsin Maritime Museum in 2023

On 1 July 1970, the Navy struck Cobia from the Naval Register, and she was towed to Manitowoc, Wisconsin to serve as an international memorial to submariners. In 1986, Cobia was incorporated as a part of the Wisconsin Maritime Museum, declared a National Historic Landmark, and placed on the National Register of Historic Places. Cobia is permanently docked at the Manitowoc River's mouth at Lake Michigan, where tours are given daily and overnight stays are available for groups or individuals.

Ongoing restoration, maintenance, and preservation efforts keep Cobia in remarkably good condition, with many systems operational, including two of the main diesel engines, the radio shack, and the SJ-1 radar, which is believed to be the oldest operating radar set in the world.
