= Becquer (disambiguation) =

Becquer or Bécquer may refer to:

- Gustavo Adolfo Domínguez Bastida, better known as Gustavo Adolfo Bécquer, a Spanish post-romanticist writer of poetry and short stories'
- Valeriano Bécquer, a Spanish painter, brother of the above.
- Salvador Bécquer Puig, a Uruguayan poet and journalist
- Julio Bécquer, a Cuban professional baseball player

== See also ==
- Becker (disambiguation)
