= Johannes Becher (politician, born 1988) =

German politician (born 1988)

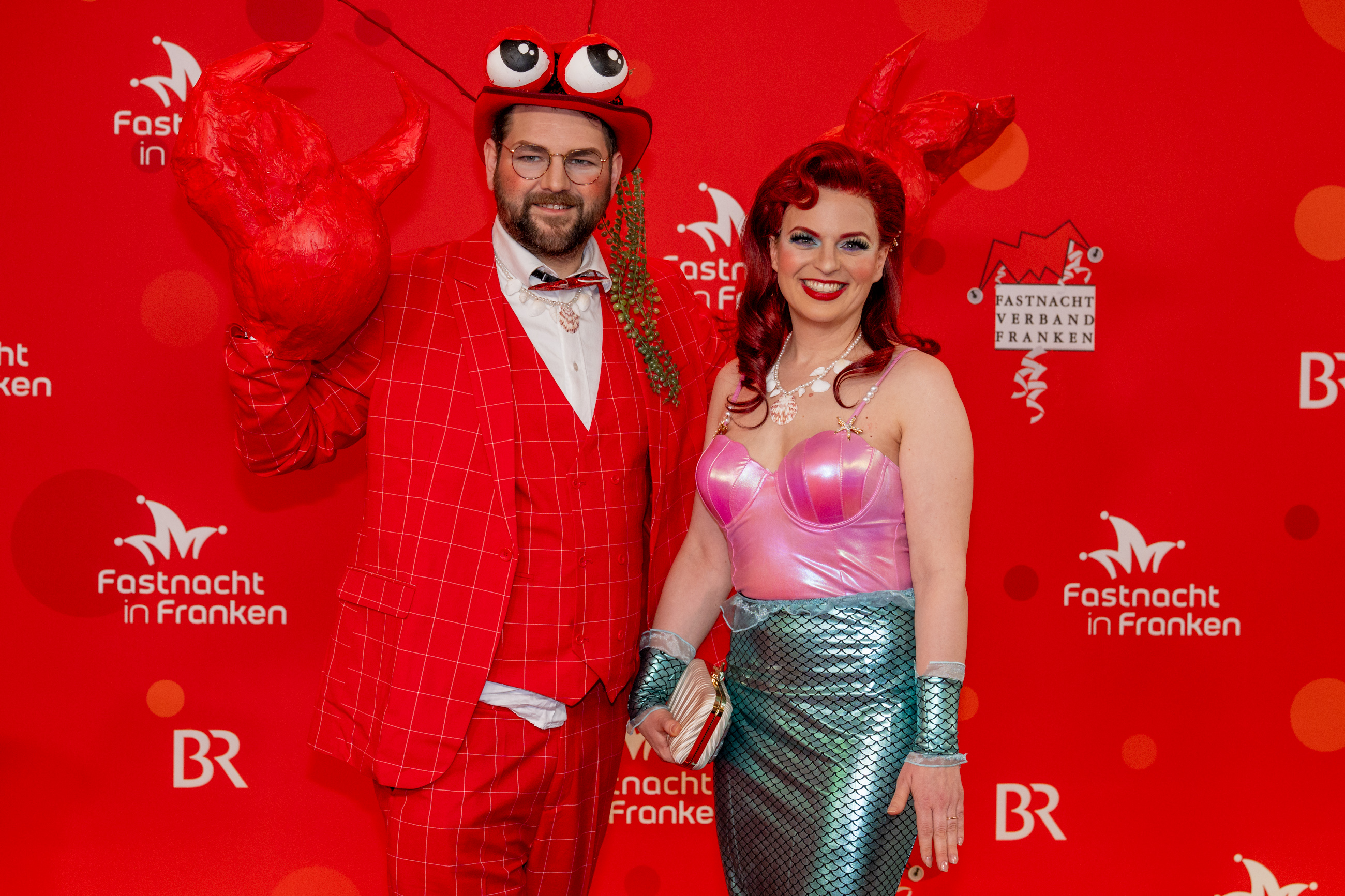
- Becher in 2026

Member of the Landtag of Bavaria
- Incumbent
- Assumed office 5 November 2018
- Constituency: Upper Bavaria

Personal details
- Born: 2 July 1988 (age 37)
- Party: Alliance 90/The Greens (since 2007)

Johannes Becher (born 2 July 1988) is a German politician serving as a member of the Landtag of Bavaria since 2018. He has served as deputy group leader of Alliance 90/The Greens since 2023.
