= Becker Township =

Becker Township may refer to one of the following places in the United States:

- Becker Township, Roberts County, South Dakota, in Roberts County, South Dakota
- Becker Township, Cass County, Minnesota
- Becker Township, Sherburne County, Minnesota
