= Becker, Texas =

- Unincorporated community
- Location within Texas Location within the United States
- Coordinates: 32°29′34″N 96°12′25″W
- Country: United States
- State: Texas
- County: Kaufman
- Elevation: 410 ft (120 m)
- Time zone: UTC-6 (Central (CST))
  - Summer (DST): UTC-5 (CDT)
- GNIS feature ID: 1377981

Becker is an unincorporated community in Kaufman County, located in the U.S. state of Texas.
