= Wisconsin Maritime Museum =

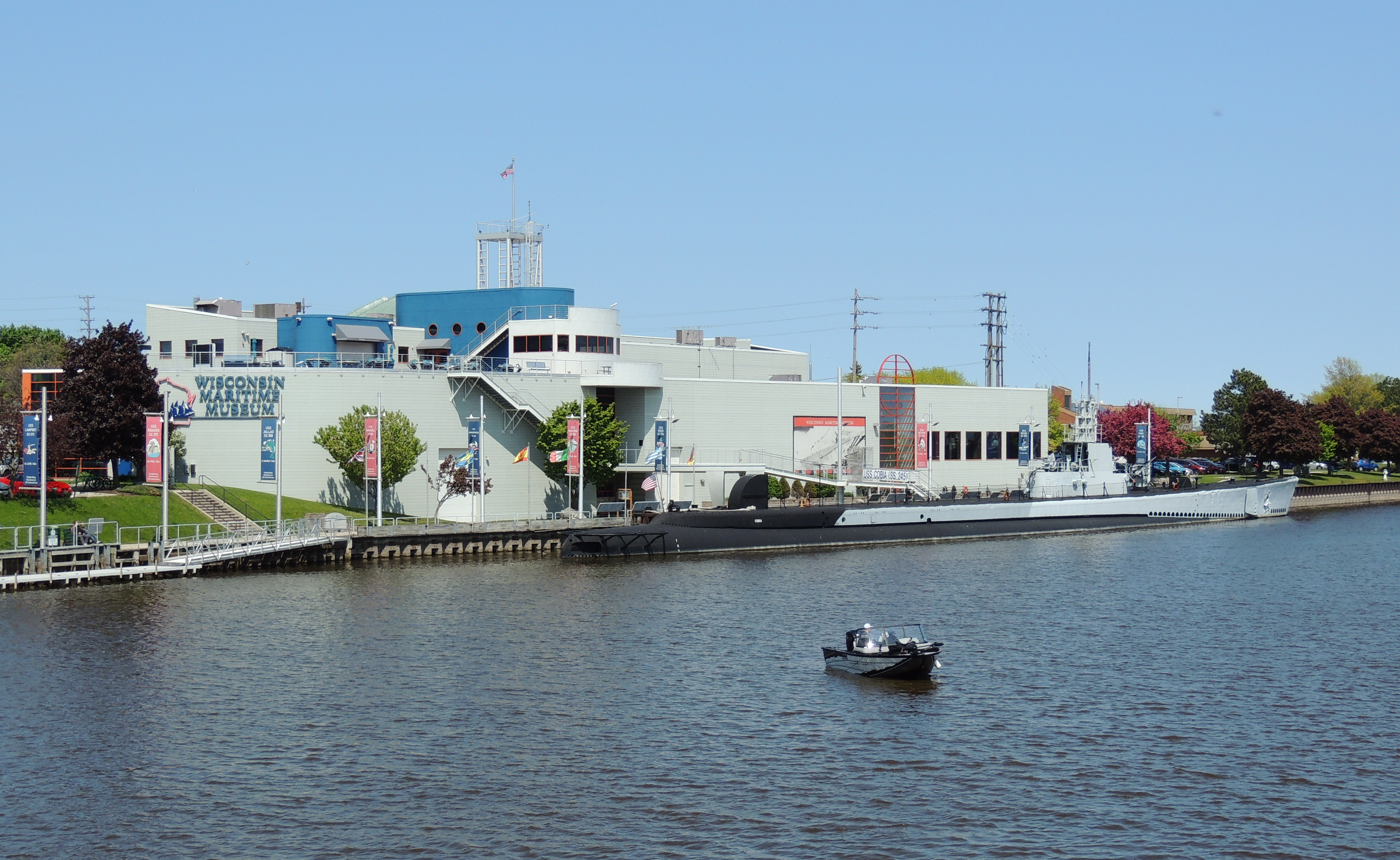
- Former name: Manitowoc Submarine Memorial Association, Manitowoc Maritime Museum
- Established: 1970
- Location: 75 Maritime Drive, Manitowoc, Wisconsin
- Coordinates: 44.093°N 87.656°W
- Type: Maritime museum
- Key holdings: USS Cobia (SS-245)
- Director: Kevin Cullen
- Website: www.wisconsinmaritime.org

The Wisconsin Maritime Museum is a maritime museum in the Lake Michigan port and shipbuilding city of Manitowoc, Wisconsin. It preserves and teaches about the maritime history of the Great Lakes and Wisconsin.

== History ==
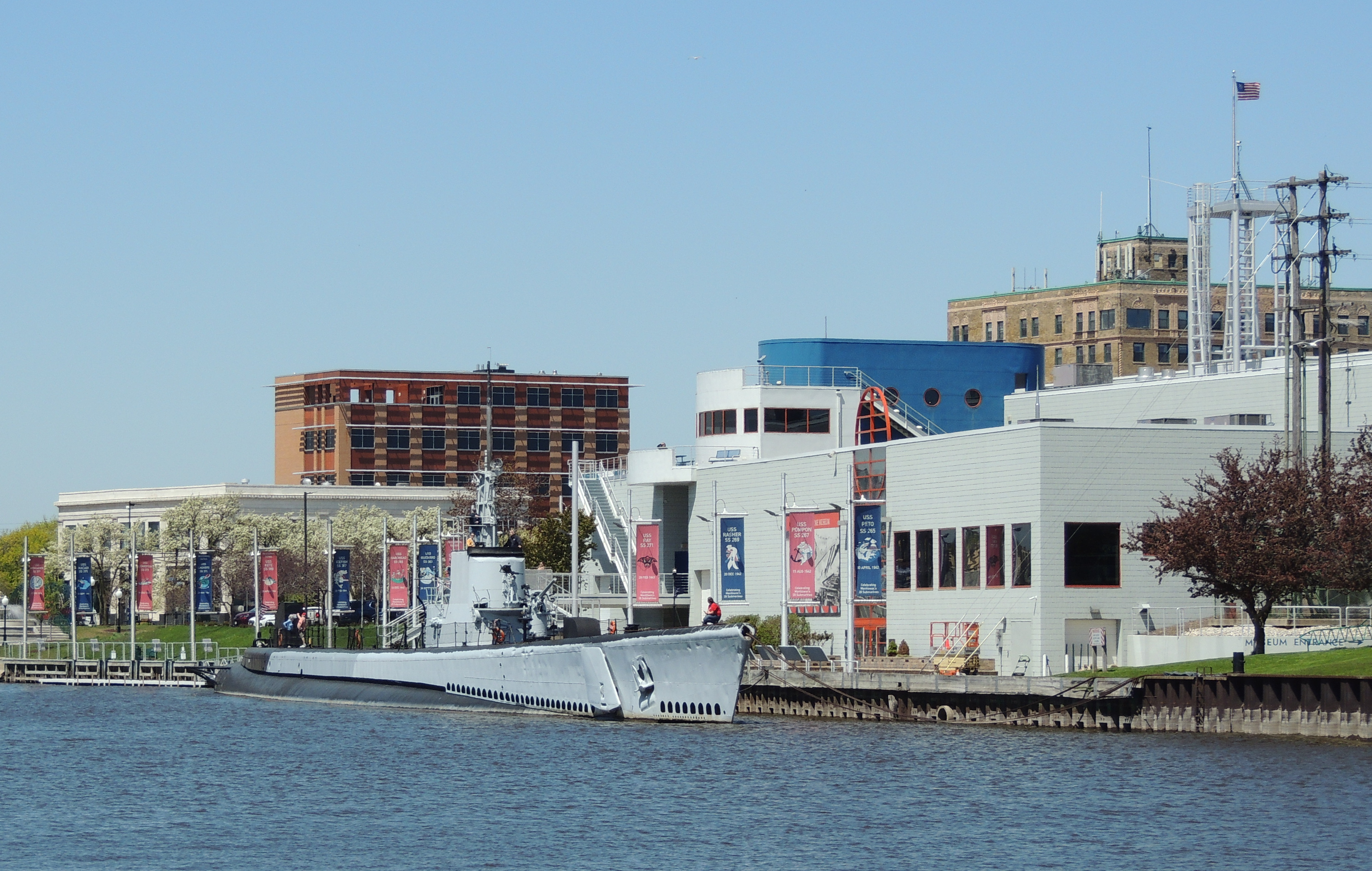

The museum was founded in 1969 as the Manitowoc Submarine Memorial Association. USS Cobia arrived in Manitowoc and was initially restored in 1970, and in 1986 became part of the museum as well as becoming a National Historic Landmark and joining the National Register of Historic Places. The submarine has been restored and has one of the oldest operational radar systems in the world.

Cobia was dry docked in 1996. In 2025, Cobia went again to the dry dock, a project that cost approximately $1.5 million.

== Exhibits ==
The museum offers guided tours of the Cobia as well as overnight youth group stays on the submarine, and partners with AirBnB to offer private overnight bookings. In addition to the Cobia, the museum displays the 65-ton Chief Wawatam steam engine and exhibits on shipbuilding and shipwrecks in Wisconsin, a model ship gallery, children's play exhibits and a temporary exhibit gallery.

== See also ==
- Door County Maritime Museum, a group of maritime museums located within Door County.
- Manitowoc Breakwater Lighthouse, a historic lighthouse in Manitowoc.
- SS Badger, the last coal-fired passenger vessel on the Great Lakes and a National Historic Landmark, which travels between Manitowoc and Ludington, Michigan.
