= Henry Corry Rowley Becher =

Canadian lawyer, politician and writer

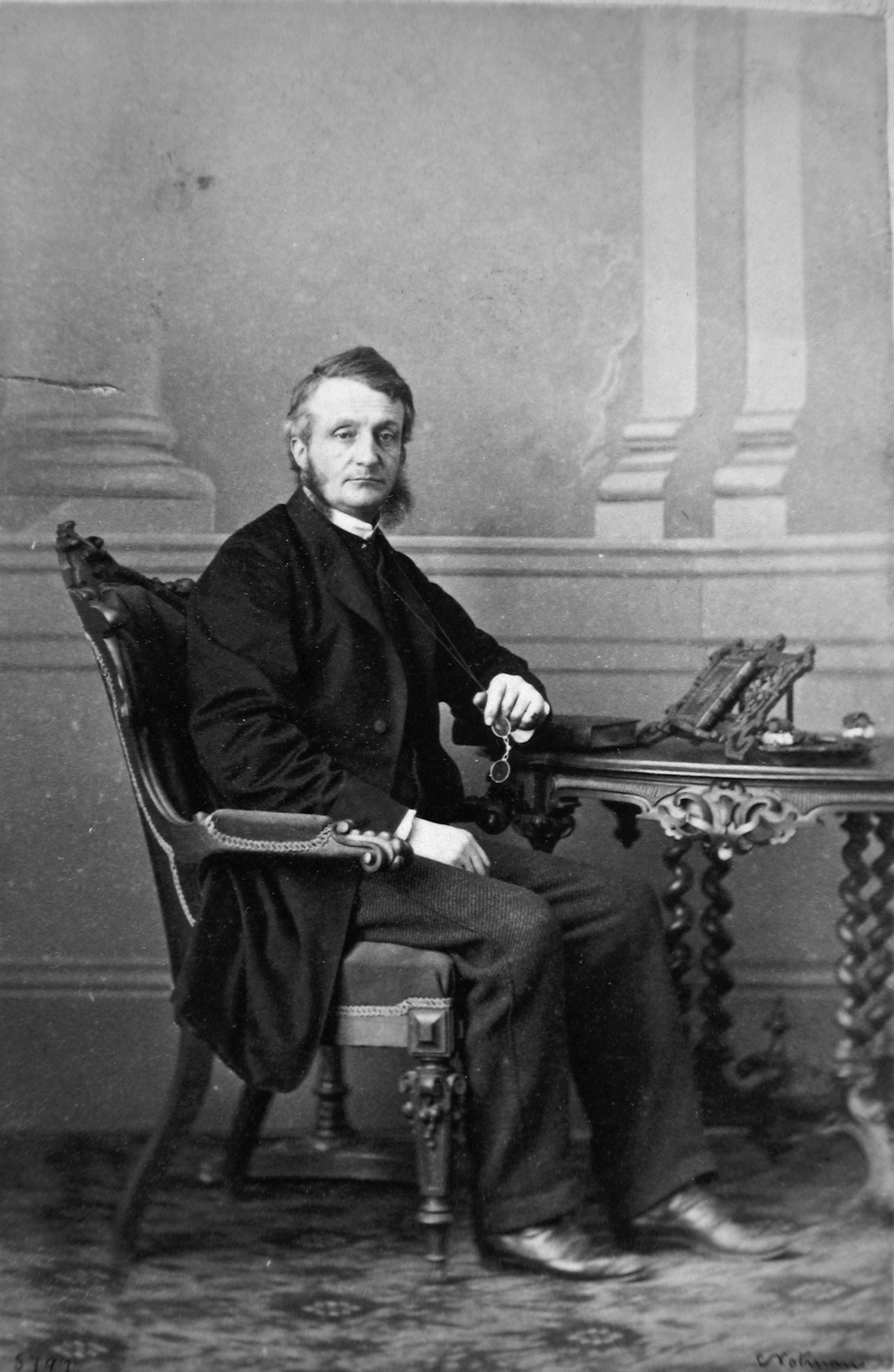
- Born: June 5, 1817; London, England
- Died: July 6, 1885 (aged 68); Sidcup, England
- Occupations: lawyer, politician, and author

Henry Corry Rowley Becher (June 5, 1817 – July 6, 1885), was a lawyer by profession, and a politician and author at a period of his life.

Becher, who was born in England, the youngest child of Captain Alexander Becher and Frances Scott, immigrated to London, Upper Canada, in 1835. He articled in law and was called to the bar in 1841. He became a bencher of the Law Society of Upper Canada and lectured for a short time at Osgoode Hall, Toronto.

Becher was a busy and important lawyer who counted Colonel Thomas Talbot as a client. He conducted crown business at various assizes in London and other location as well numerous civil briefs. In 1857 he became a director of the Great Western Railway in what became the province of Ontario. His house "Thornwood", built in 1852 to Henry's own design is the second oldest surviving house in London, Ontario. He was married to Sarah Evanson Leonard in 1841 and they had 8 children.

In 1880 he was made a fellow of the Royal Geographical Society.
