= Becker Professional Education =

Becker Professional Education logo

Becker Professional Education is a global provider of accounting exam review courses and continuing professional education in accounting and finance. It is best known for its CPA Exam prep courses, which have helped nearly two million candidates pass the Uniform CPA Exam and become Certified Public Accountants. However, they have expanded to offer more credentialing exam review courses as well as continuing professional education (CPE).

== History ==
Becker was founded in 1957 by Newton D. Becker, a CPA and educator who initially developed the course to train colleagues at Price Waterhouse. Their CPA Exam Review was the first of its kind available to a broad audience.

The company became independent in 1960 and rapidly expanded, offering in-person classes in over 90 cities by the 1980s. In 1996, Becker was acquired by DeVry Inc. (later Adtalem Global Education), and in 2022, it was acquired by Colibri Group, a professional education company that also serves real estate, healthcare, teaching, valuation & property services, and financial services.

== Products and services ==
Becker’s self-study exam review packages include digital and physical textbooks, lecture videos, adaptive learning technology, practice tests, simulated exams, and Newt, an AI study tool.

=== Current products ===
- CPA Exam Review prepares tax, audit, finance, and accounting professionals to earn their CPA license using regularly updated, AICPA-aligned content.
- CMA Exam Review to prepare financial and management accountants to earn their Certified Management Accountant credential, working with the Institute of Management Accountants to provide exam-aligned content.
- EA Exam Review developed in 2024 to meet the growing needs of tax professionals, helping them earn their Enrolled Agent designation by passing the IRS’s Special Enrollment Examination.
- CIA Exam Review developed in 2025 in partnership with the Institute of Internal Auditors® (The IIA®) to help internal auditors earn their Certified Internal Auditor® credential.

Becker also offers Continuing Professional Education (CPE) courses to support CPAs, CMAs, and other credentialed accounting and finance professionals, as well as IRS-approved Enrolled Agent continuing education.

In 2024, Becker partnered with the Robert J. Trulaske, Sr. College of Business at the University of Missouri to offer Becker Academy, which are courses designed to fill in knowledge gaps and build foundational information needed to study for the CPA Exam.

== Global presence ==
Becker provides their exam reviews to a global audience through a network of international partners and institutions. These include Morgan International, Bikai Corporate Management Consulting, Global International Management, LLC, Nova Global Education Co., Ltd., and TAC Co. Ltd., as well as global chapters from The Institute of Internal Auditors, and others.

In 2025, Becker entered a partnership with Simandhar Education, providing Simandhar with exclusive distribution rights in India of Becker’s CPA and CMA Exam Review courses.

== Accreditations and recognitions ==
Becker is registered with the National Association of State Boards of Accountancy (NASBA) as a sponsor of continuing professional education for CPAs and with the Internal Revenue Service for EAs.

=== Becker has also received the following accreditations and recognitions ===
- Council for Higher Education’s Institutional Accreditation
- Best CPA Exam Review: Crush the CPA Exam
- Best CPA Review Course: Accounting Institute for Success

=== Notable contributions and influence ===
Becker has played a pivotal role in shaping the CPA exam prep industry. According to the AICPA’s Journal of Accountancy, as many as half of all U.S. CPAs have used Becker’s materials to pass the exam.

The company’s alumni network includes professionals at top accounting firms and Fortune 1000 companies.

==== Acquisition by Colibri Group ====
In 2022, Becker was acquired by Colibri Group, expanding its capabilities in accounting, mortgage, and governance, risk, and compliance (GRC) education.

Colibri’s acquisition marked a strategic move to deepen its offerings in professional education and broaden its global footprint.

==== About Newton Becker ====
Newton D. Becker (1928–2012) was a visionary educator and entrepreneur. For his contributions, he was awarded an Honorary Doctorate from Kent State and received the Accountant of the Year Award from Beta Alpha Psi. He was also a pioneer in solar energy investment and a philanthropist supporting a wide variety of interests.
