= Beaker =

Beaker may refer to:

== Containers ==
- Beaker (drinkware), a beverage container
- Beaker (laboratory equipment), a glass container used for holding liquids in a laboratory setting
- Beaker (archaeology), a prehistoric drinking vessel
- Beaker culture, the archaeological culture often called the Beaker people
- Sippy cup, referred to as a beaker in UK English

== Other uses ==
- Beaker (Muppet), the hapless assistant of Dr. Bunsen Honeydew on The Muppet Show
- Tracy Beaker, a fictional character
- Norman Beaker, British guitarist born Norman Hume in 1950
- Beaker (album), an album by the band 22 Brides
- Beaker (web browser), a peer-to-peer browser with tools to create and host websites
- The Beakers, an art punk band

== See also ==
- Beker (disambiguation)
