= Gottfried Becker =

Gottfried Becker may refer to:

- Johann Gottfried Becker (pharmacist, born 1639) (1639–1711), German-Danish pharmacist
- Gottfried Becker (pharmacist, born 1681) (1681–1750), Danish pharmacist, his son
- Johan Gottfried Becker (pharmacist, born 1723) (1723–1790), Danish pharmacist, father of Gottfried
- Gottfried Becker (pharmacist, born 1767) (1767–1845), Danish pharmacist
- Gottfried Wilhelm Becker (1778–1854), German physician and writer
- Johann Gottfried Burman Becker (1802–1880), Danish pharmacist and writer
