= Alfred Benzon (1823–1884) =

Danish businessman

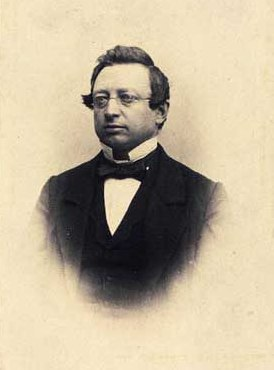
- Born: 4 December 1823; Stubbekøbing, Denmark
- Died: 10 December 1884 (aged 61); Copenhagen, Denmark
- Occupation: Pharmacist
- Known for: Svane Apotek, Alfred Benzon A/S

Alfred Nicolai Benzon (4 December 1823 – 19 December 1884) was a Danish pharmacist and industrialist. He was the proprietor of the Swan Pharmacy on Østergade in Copenhagen and founder of Denmark's first pharmaceutical company Alfred Benzon A/S. The company was later continued by his sons Alfred and Otto Benzon.

== Early life and education ==
Benzon was born in Stubbekøbing on Falster, the son of merchant Lorenz Jacob Benzon (1790–1864) and Kirstine Hansen (1793–1862). From 1838 he was apprenticed to Gottfried Becker in the Royal Court Pharmacy in Copenhagen. He earned the MPharm degree in 1845 and was then employed by court pharmacist Rudel in Kiel and a pharmaceutical company in Hamburg before continuing his pharmaceutical studies in Bonn.

== Career ==
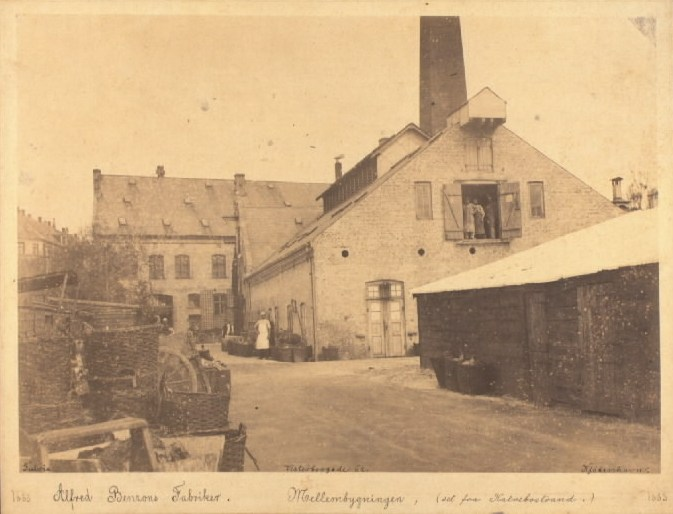
Akfred Benzon's factory at Vesterbrogade 72 in 1883

The company was founded by Alfred Nicolai Benzon on 1 January 1849, when he acquired the pharmacy Svane Apotek on Østergade in Copenhagen and at the same time established a wholesale business. In 1863 he established a chemical factory at Kalvebod Beach. In 1877 he established Teknisk Materialhandel at Ny Østergade 4.

== Personal life and legacy ==
Benzon married Anna Dorothea Vilhelmine Østergaard (20 July 1823 – 25 July 1893), daughter of merchant Peter Larsen Østergaard (1778–1836) and Anna Britta Holmstrøm (1781–1856), on 17 July 1849 in the Garrison Church in Copenhagen. They had two sons.

In 1874, Benzon was created a Knight in the Order of the Dannebrog. He died on 19 December 1884 and is buried at Assistens Cemetery.
