= Budtz Müller =

Danish photographer (1837–1884)

Bertel Christian Budtz Müller
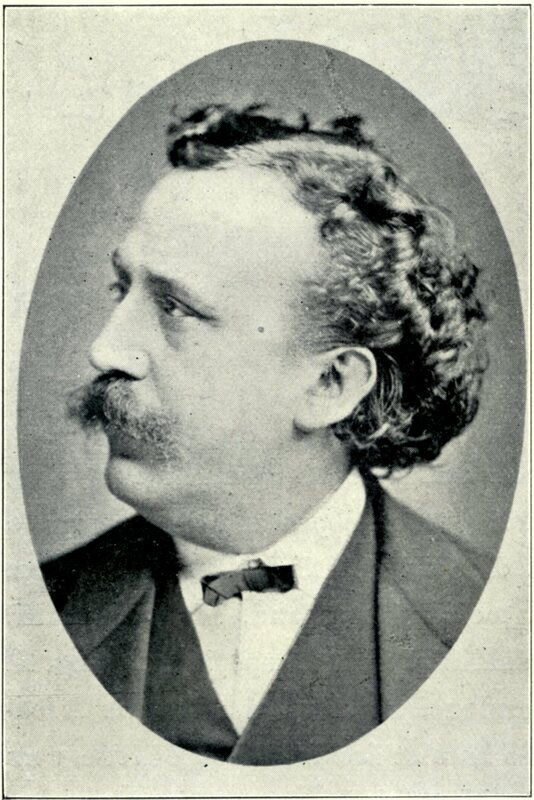
- Born: 26 December 1837; Mariager, Denmark
- Died: 30 December 1884 (aged 47); Copenhagen, Denmark
- Occupation: Photographer

Bertel Christian Budtz Müller (26 December 1837 – 30 December 1884) was a pioneering Danish photographer. He operated the photographic studio Budtz Müller & Co. at Bredgade 21 in Copenhagen and was appointed as court photographer in Denmark, Norway and Sweden.

== Early life and education ==
Budtz Müller was born in Mariager, the son of teacher Rasmus Müller (1787–1854) and Arnolde Cathrine Grundtvig (1803–1888). He apprenticed as a pharmacist in Aalborg and then moved to Copenhagen where he graduated as candidatus pharmaciae in 1858. He worked for a year in Randers, and was then employed by Alfred Benzon, founder of Alfred Benzon A/S, at the Swan Pharmacy in Copenhagen in 1859.

== Career ==
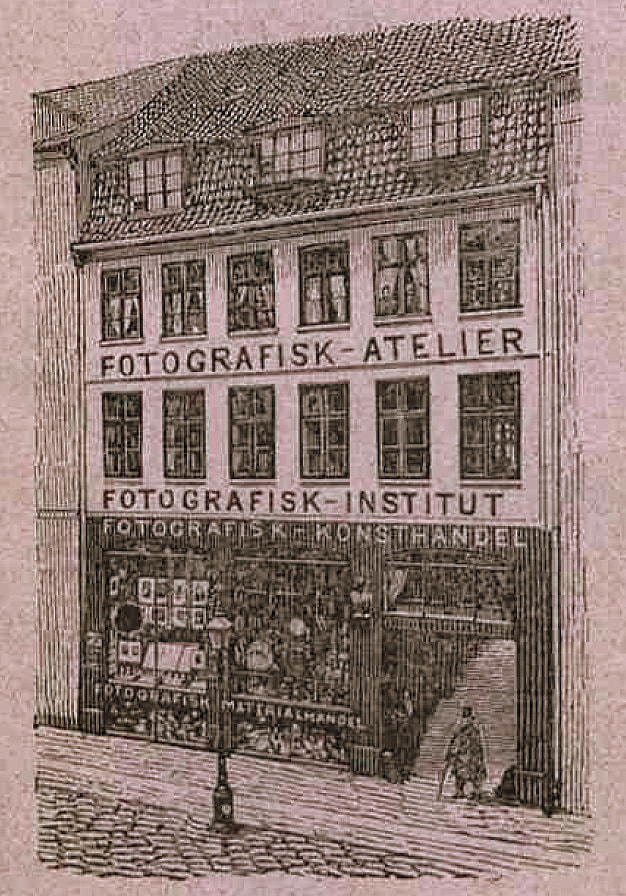
Budtz Müller at Bredgade 21 in Copenhagen

Müller and Benzon opened a shop with photography equipment at Bredgade 21 in 1862. It was converted into a photographic institute with student programmes in 1863. Benzon left the company in 1866. Müller was instead joined by the art historian Philip Weilbach until 1871, and from then on owned Budtz Müller & Co. alone.

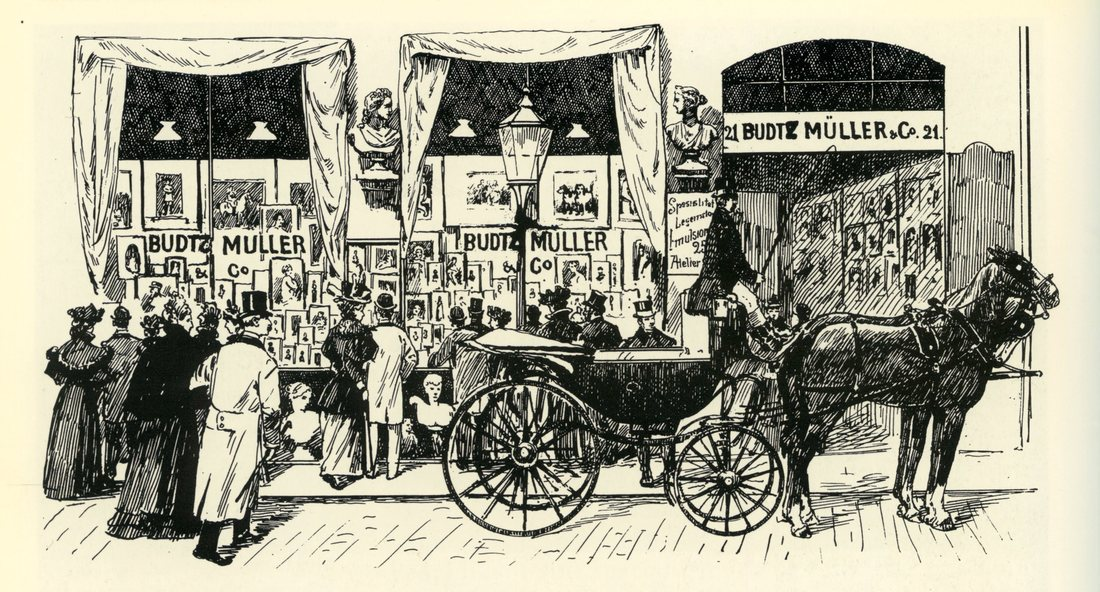
Budtz Müller at Bredgade 21 on a drawing by Knud Gamborg

The firm offered a wide selection of high quality stereoscopies and photographs in large and small formats from Copenhagen. Other images were of prominent cultural figures such as Grundtvig, Hans Christian Andersen, actors in costumes, works by Bertel Thorvaldsen and 33 stereoscopies from Greenland recorded in 1866. Other series included Danish monuments (1865-) with text by Weilbach, Knippelsbro (1869), paintings in the Royal Danish Painting Collection at Christiansborg Palace (1869), drawings by Danish and foreign artists (1872), paintings by Danish, Norwegian and Swedish artists (1872), drawings and paintings by Holger Roed (1874), weapons in the Royal Danish Arsenal (1877), and Christiansborg Palace (1884). A folder with 35 images by Haldor Topsøe from Fylla's expedition to Greenland was also published in 1877.

Budtz Müller collaborated with Jean Christian Ferslew in introducing photolithography to the Danish market and created the first photolithographic maps for the Danish General Staff, as well as a number of reproductions of manuscripts for the Arnamagnæan Institute. Müller and Ferslew published Gotfred af Ghemen's print from 1495 of Den danske Rimkrønike in 1873.

Budtz Müller was in 1869 appointed as Swedish and Norwegian court photographer and in 1870 also as Danish court photographer. He wrote a number of articles about the history of photography in Den fotografiske Forenings Tidende in 1865.

Müller's photographic studio in Bredgade was continued for a few years after his death by Ludvig Johan Offenberg (1863–1904) under the name Budtz Müller.

== Personal life ==
Müller married Maren Christine Petersen (1840–1878), a foster daughter of dyer Hans Nikolaj Edinger Grundtvig (1807–1887) and Anna Marie Petersen (1804–1865), on 4 December 1863 in the Church of Our Lady in Copenhagen.

== Selected publications ==
- Thorvaldsen, Bertel; Müller, Budtz (1871). Thorvaldsens Arbeider efter Originalværkerne i Thorvaldsens Museum og Frue Kirke i fotografiske Fremstillinger udførte af Budtz Müller & Co. med dansk og fransk Text. (Les œuvres de Thorvaldsen d'aprè les originaux du Musée Thorvaldsen et de l'Eglise de Notre Dame) (in French). Budtz Müller.
- Ghemen, G. (1873). Den Danske Rimkrønike, trykt ved Gotfred af Ghemen: Kjøbenhavn 1495. Udgivet i fotolithografisk Faksimile af Budtz Müller & Co. og C. Ferslew & Co. i Kjøbenhavn 1873 (in Danish). Budtz Müller.
