= Alfred Benzon =

Alfred Benzon may refer to:

- Alfred Benzon (1823–1884), Danish pharmacist and businessman
- Alfred Benzon (1855–1932), Danish pharmacist and businessman
- Alfred Benzon A/S, Danish company
