= Svane Apotek (Copenhagen) =

Building in Copenhagen

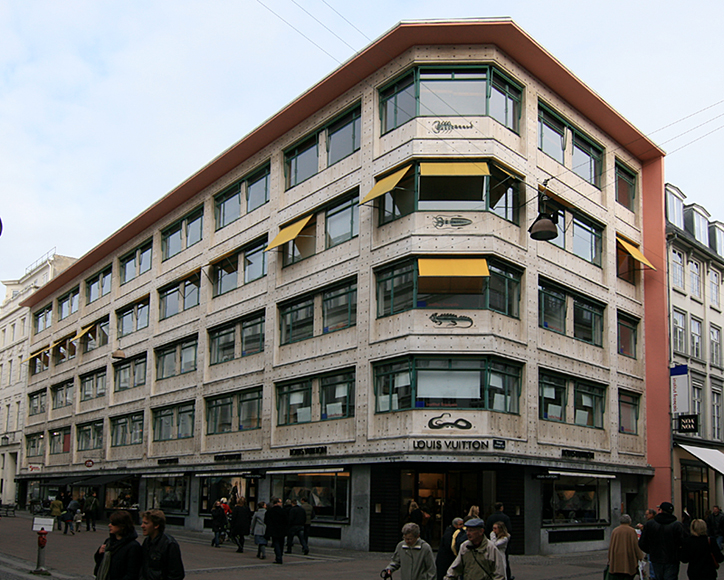
- The building seen from Østergade
- Interactive map of the Svane Apotek area

General information
- Location: Copenhagen, Denmark
- Coordinates: 55°40′48.85″N 12°35′0.52″E
- Completed: 1934

Design and construction
- Architect: Bent Helweg-Møller

Svane Apotek (lit. 'Swan Pharmacy'), which existed from 1660 to 1994, was one of the first pharmacies to open in Copenhagen, Denmark. It was in 1849 acquired by Alfred Nicolai Bentzon and was owned by the Benzon family until 1967. Its former building. a five-storey, Functionalist property located at the corner of Østergade (No. 18) and Ny Østergade (No. 2-4), was listed on the Danish registry of protected buildings and places by the Danish Heritage Agency in 1992.

== History ==
=== The Heerfordt family, 1660–1781 ===
The pharmacy was established on 6 September 1660 by Christopher Heerfordt and was then located in Højbrostræde. Heerfordt, who was originally from Hungary, had been running the pharmacies in Nykøbing Falster and Nakskov for a couple of years but they were now passed on to two of his sons-in-law. His new pharmacy was one of four pharmacies in Copenhagen with royal privilege. The others were Løve Apotek on Amagertorv, Elefant Apotek on Købmagergade and Kong Salomons Apotek. Heerfordt's son, Jeerfordt Jr., took over the operations after his father's death in 1673. He died in 1691 and the pharmacy was then run by his widow Cecilie Iversdatter until 1721 and it stayed in the family until 31 December 1782.

=== Changing owners, 1782–1849 ===
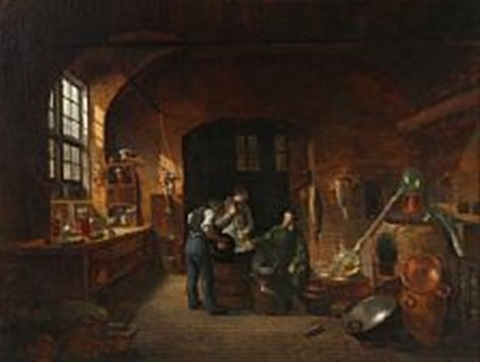
Christian Faber: The Swan Pharmacy's laboratory.

Johann Andreas Mühlensteth purchased the pharmacy in 1781 and was at the same time granted permission to move it to a site in Østergade. The new pharmacy opened in 1782.

Mühlensteth sold the pharmacy to Frederik Gerhard Voss in 1803. On 1806, it was acquired by Nicolai Jørgen Stolpe. Lauritz Terpager Hagen became a partner in 1816 and was the sole owner from 26 March 1819. In August 1825 the pharmacy changed hands again when it was acquired by Therkel Johannes Gottlob Schønberg Baagoe. His widow Hedvig Harlotte, née Andresen, continued the operations after his death in 1837.

=== The Benzon family, 1849–1967 ===
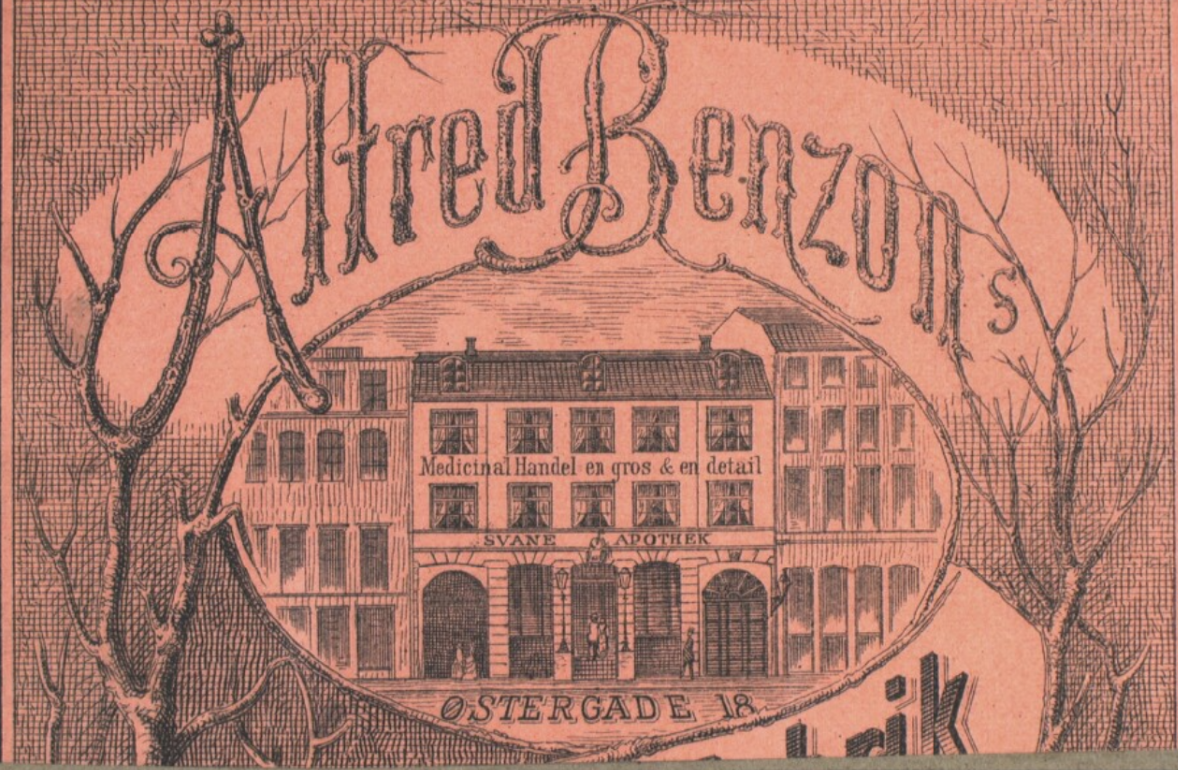
Alfred Benzons Medicinal Business Wholesale & Retail

Alfred Nicolai Bentzon acquired the pharmacy in 1849. He established Alfred Benzon A/S . The building on Østergade was replaced by a new one in 1877.

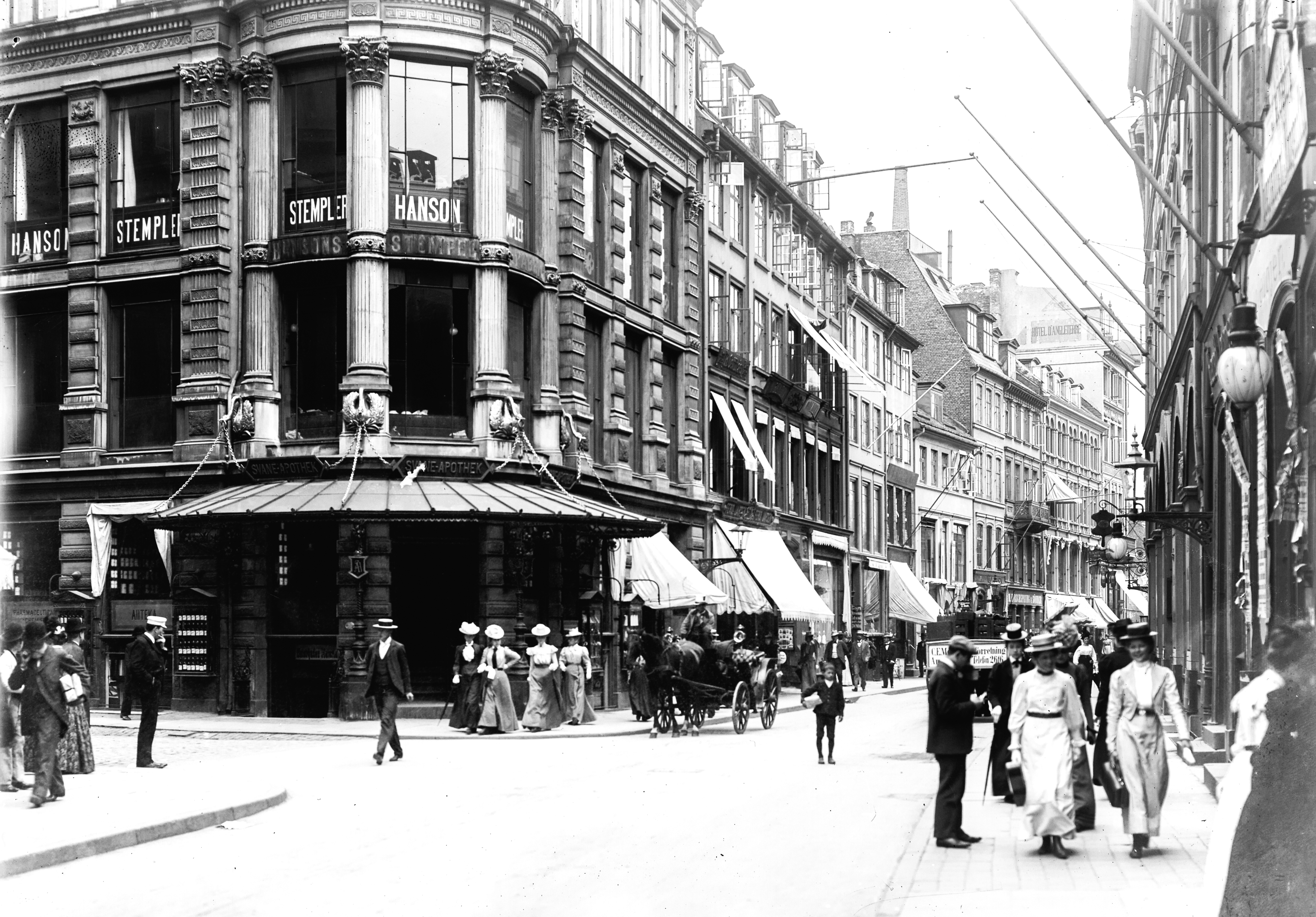
The previous building photographed by Frederik Riise.,

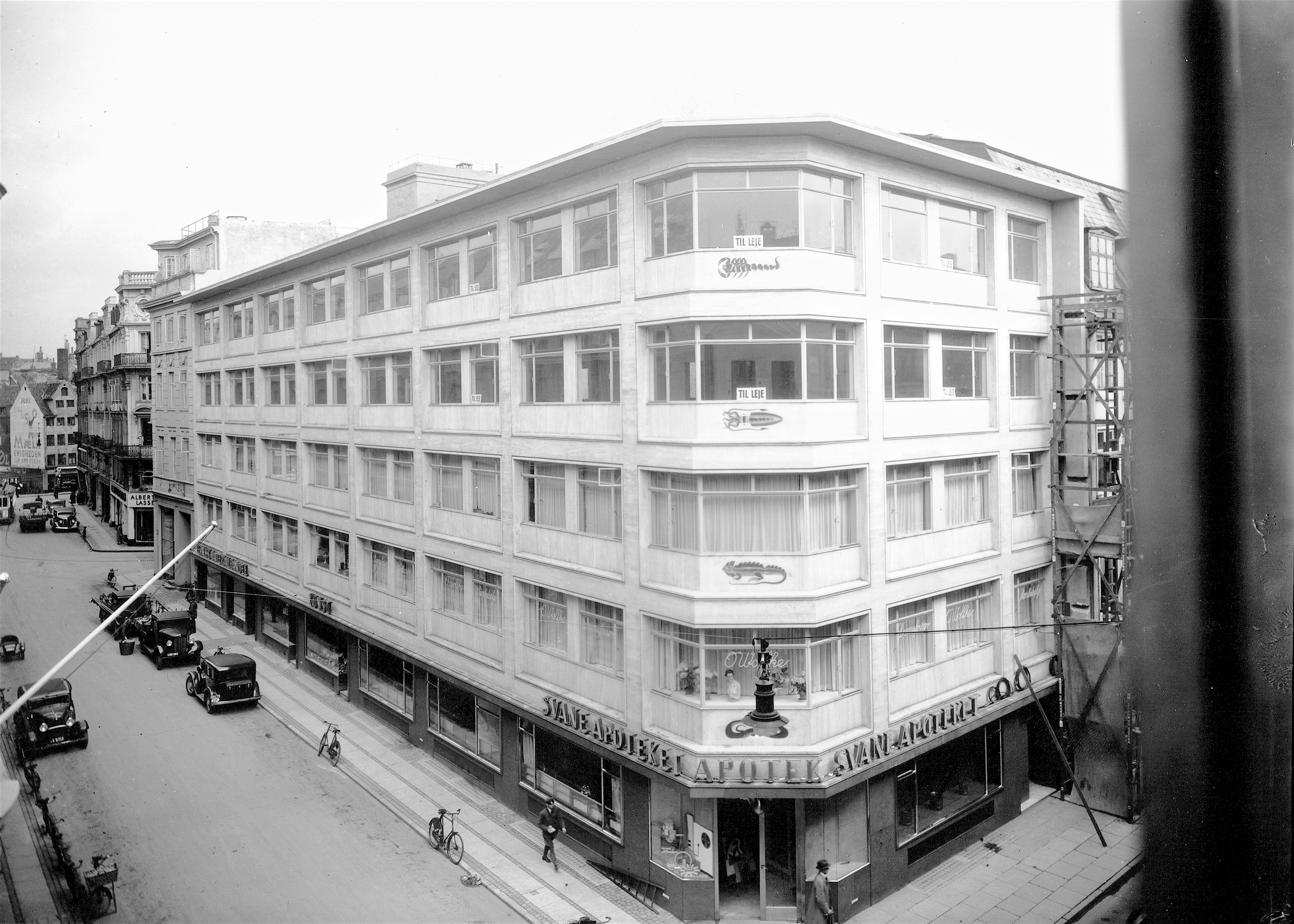
The new building in 1935,

Alfred Bentzon's two sons, Alfred Benzon and Otto Benzon, took over the pharmacy after their father's death in 1884. Otto Benzon died in 1827 and Alfred Benzon died in 1932. Niels Benzon replaced the old building on Østergade with a new one that was completed in 1934. It was designed by the architect Bent Helweg-Møller in collaboration with the engineers C. N. Nøkkentved and Svend Friis Jespersen.

=== Later history ===
Niels Thøgersen acquired the pharmacy after Niels Benzon's death in 1967 and 31 December 1993. It was then taken over by the Danish Health Agency but closed on 6 February 1994.

== Today ==
A Bang & Olufsen flagship store has now opened in the former pharmacy. Ole Lynggaard Copenhagen has a flagship store at Ny Østergade 4.
