= Alfred Benzon A/S =

Danish chemical wholesaler

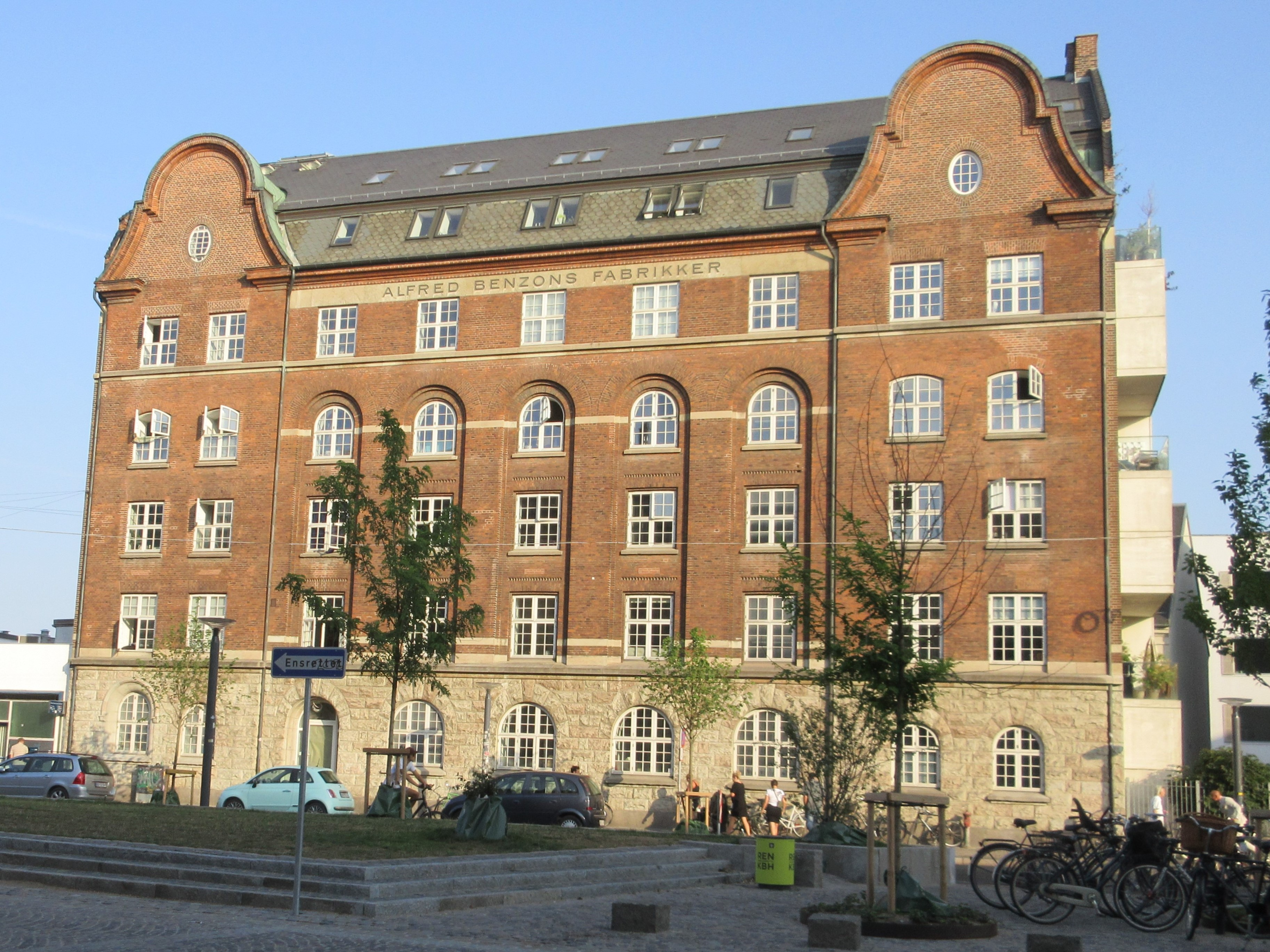
Alfred Benzon's former headquarters at Halmtorvet 29 in Copenhagen

Alfred Benzon A/S was a wholesaler of chemicals based in Copenhagen, Denmark. Its former headquarters at Halmtorvet 29 in Vesterbro was converted into apartments in 2008.

== History ==
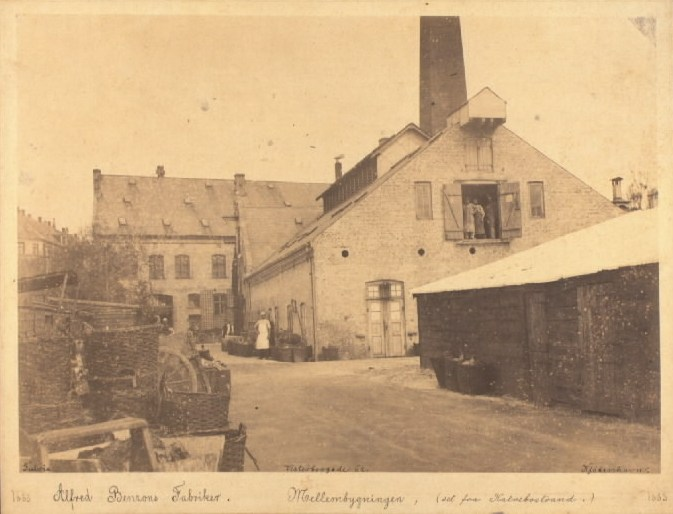
Alfred Benzon's factory at Vesterbrogade 72 in 1883

The company was founded by Alfred Benzon (1823–1884) on 1 January 1849, when he acquired the pharmacy Svane Apotek on Østergade in Copenhagen and in the same time established a wholesaling business. In 1863 he established a chemical factory at Kalvebod Beach. In 1877 he established Teknisk Materialhandel at Ny Østergade 4.

After Alfred Benzon's death in 1884, his company was passed on to his sons Alfred Benzon (1855–1932) and Otto Benzon (1856–1927).

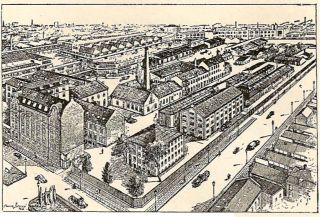
Alfred Benzon's site at Halmtorvet in Copenhagen

Alfred Benzon Jr.'s son Bøje Benzon (1891–1976) and Otto Benzon's son Niels Benzon (1893–1975) became partners in the company in 1928. The factory and warehouses in Copenhagen were expanded several times and a department in Malmö was established in 1909. It was later followed by departments in Odense in 1932 and in Aarhus in 1937.

The company became a limited company (A/S) in 1936. Niels Benzon gave up his share of it but became the sole owner of Svaneapoteket as well as the subsidiary A/B Alfred Benzon & Co. in Malmø.

Medicinalco A/S acquired the pharmaceutical factory Alfred Benzon A/S' wholesaling business in 1959. It was operated under the name Mecobenzon A/S. In 1991 it was merged with Nordisk Droge and Kemikalie A/S under the name Nomeco. Monberg & Thorsen acquired all shares in Alfred Benzon A/S in 1965–1986 and the two companies merged in 1990.

== Legacy ==
The company's headquarters from 1908 at Halmtorvet 29 was converted into apartments in 2007–08. The building features a trompe-l'œil mural on one of its gables. Two older buildings from 1864 and 1867 has also survived.

The Alfred Benzon Foundation supports medical researchers and pharmacists.

== See also ==
- Gustav Lotze A/S
