= Aksel Hansen =

Danish sculptor (1853–1933)

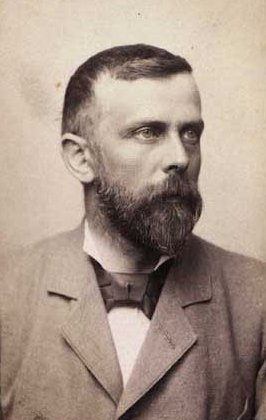
- Portrait of Aksel Hansen by early Danish photographer Ludvig Grundtvig
- Born: 2 September 1853; Odense, Denmark
- Died: 3 May 1933 (aged 79); Copenhagen, Denmark
- Resting place: Assistens Cemetery
- Education: Royal Danish Academy of Fine Arts
- Known for: Sculptor
- Notable work: Echo, 1888

Signature
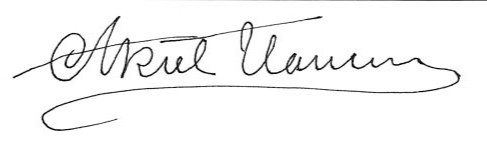

Aksel Christian Henrik Hansen (2 September 1853 – 3 May 1933) was a Danish sculptor, and one of the most productive of his era. Although classically trained at the Royal Danish Academy of Fine Arts in a naturalistic style, Hansen developed his own style which borrowed from Art Nouveau.

Hansen was one of the fore portrait sculptors in Denmark. Among his best known works are the six giants in the guardroom at Christiansborg Palace (1912) and the equestrian statue of King Christian IX (1912) in Odense's Royal Gardens.

== Early life and education ==
Aksel Christian Henrik Hansen was born on 2 September 1853 in Odense to Caroline and Vilhelm Hansen. His father was a master craftsman and stonemason. As a young man, he apprenticed with his father, learning stonemasonry, and with H. C. Berg in Copenhagen, where he learned wood carving.

While apprenticing in Copenhagen, he worked with Frederik Hammeleff. Hammeleff introduced Hansen to sculpting, which led to him applying to the Royal Danish Academy of Fine Arts.

He studied at the Royal Danish Academy of Fine Arts from 1876 to December 1879. He was awarded the Hielmstierne-Rosencrone, Anckerske, and Royal Academy scholarships which he used to visit Italy from 1880 to 1881. He later took another study trip to Greece in 1904. On 13 July 1884, Hansen married Ellen Margrethe Smith (1866–1930) in Copenhagen.

== Career ==
Hansen exhibited at the Charlottenborg Spring Exhibition for the first time 1880. He made his debut as an artist with his work En fløjteblæsende dreng. His early works, including Hagar and Ismael, an 1881 plasterwork, are considered classical in reflection of his training at the Academy.

In the mid-1880s, Hansen received many commissions for both private and public sculptures. In 1885, he produced busts of Gustav Lotze and his wife, for whom he would later also produce their tomb. He produced a likeness of Christian Richardt in 1886 followed by Meïr Aron Goldschmidt in 1887.

In 1888, he gained attention at the Nordic Exhibition with his work Echo. The sculpture features a woman a nude woman in a more Art Nouveau style which broke with his classical training. The work was likely influenced by French sculptures that were collected Carl Jacobsen and by Stephan Sinding, whose work was exhibited in Copenhagen around this time. A bronze casting of the piece was purchased for the royal garden at Rosenborg Castle. His emerging style was further cemented by the tomb he produced for the Lotze family. The tomb lies in Assistens Kirkegård in Odense and features slender Art Nouveau figures.

His only venture into interior design was produced during the turn of the century at Sølyst. He had been commissioned by Consul General Holmbald to redesign the estate's dining room in his Art Nouveau style. Hansen designed the stucco ceiling, radiators, fireplace mantels, and decorative panels above the doors. The space, which had been decorated in his signature mixture of organic ornamentation and slim figures, no longer survives. The furniture for the space was comparatively minimalistic and had been produced by Mørck & Søn in mahogany.

Following his work at Sølyst, Hansen had a series of commissions for public art. In 1907, he produced a likeness of Thomas Riise Segelcke (1831–1902), followed by Hans Broge in 1910. In 1912, he erected an equestrian statue of Christian IX in Odense. Between 1910 and 1917, he produced six Atlases for Christiansborg Palace. These colossal columns were likely inspired by the Belvedere in Vienna and are perhaps the work for which Hansen is best known today.

== Selected works ==
- Echo, Rosenborg Castle Gardens, Copenhagen (1888)
- Hans Tausen Monument, Birkende, Funen (1894)
- Christian IV, Odense Palace, Odense
- Ancient hunter, Dalgas Boulevard, Frederiksberg, Copenhagen
- Ambrosius, Frederick's Church, Copenhagen

== Image gallery ==
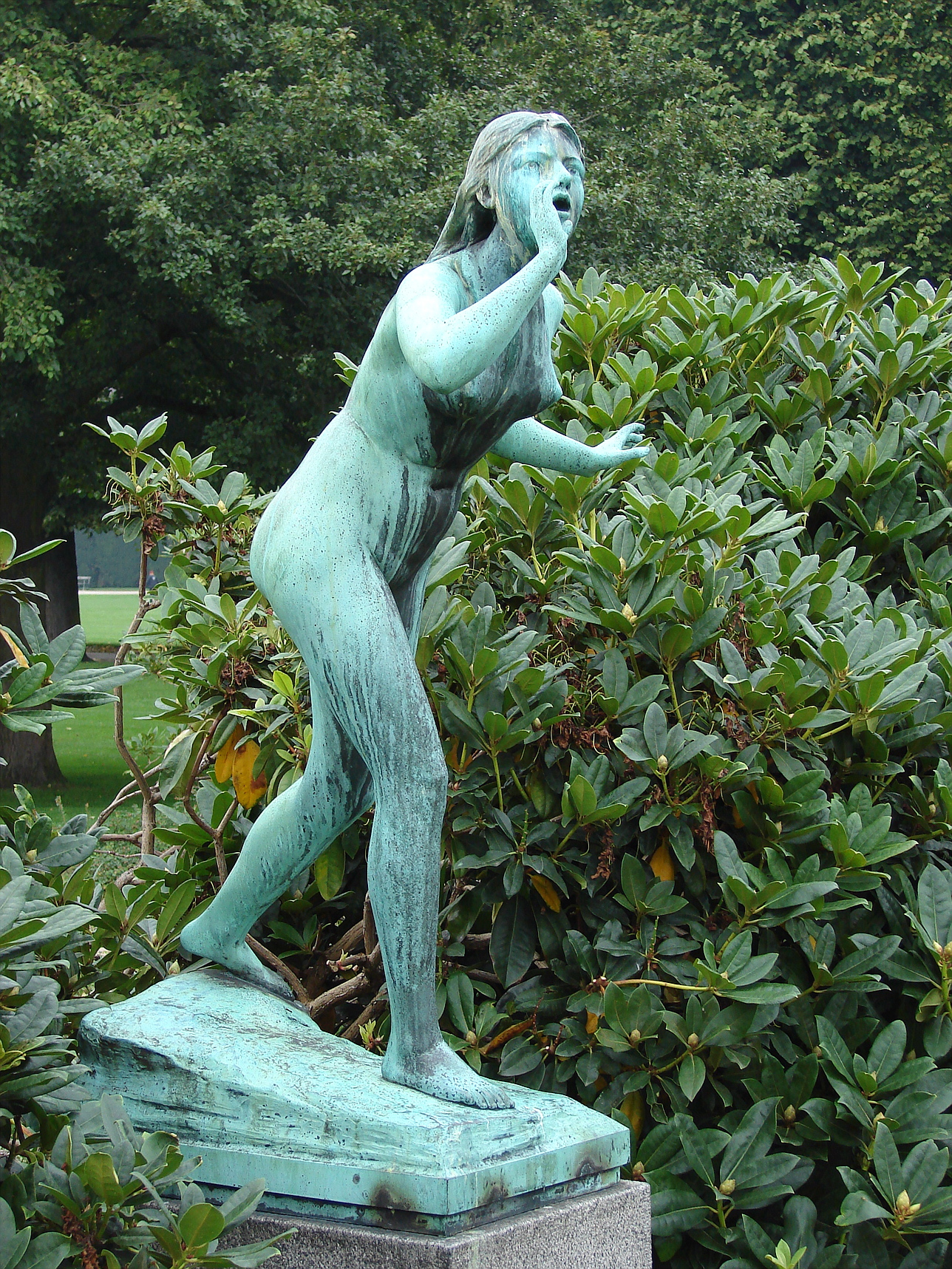
Echo
Rosenborg Castle Gardens

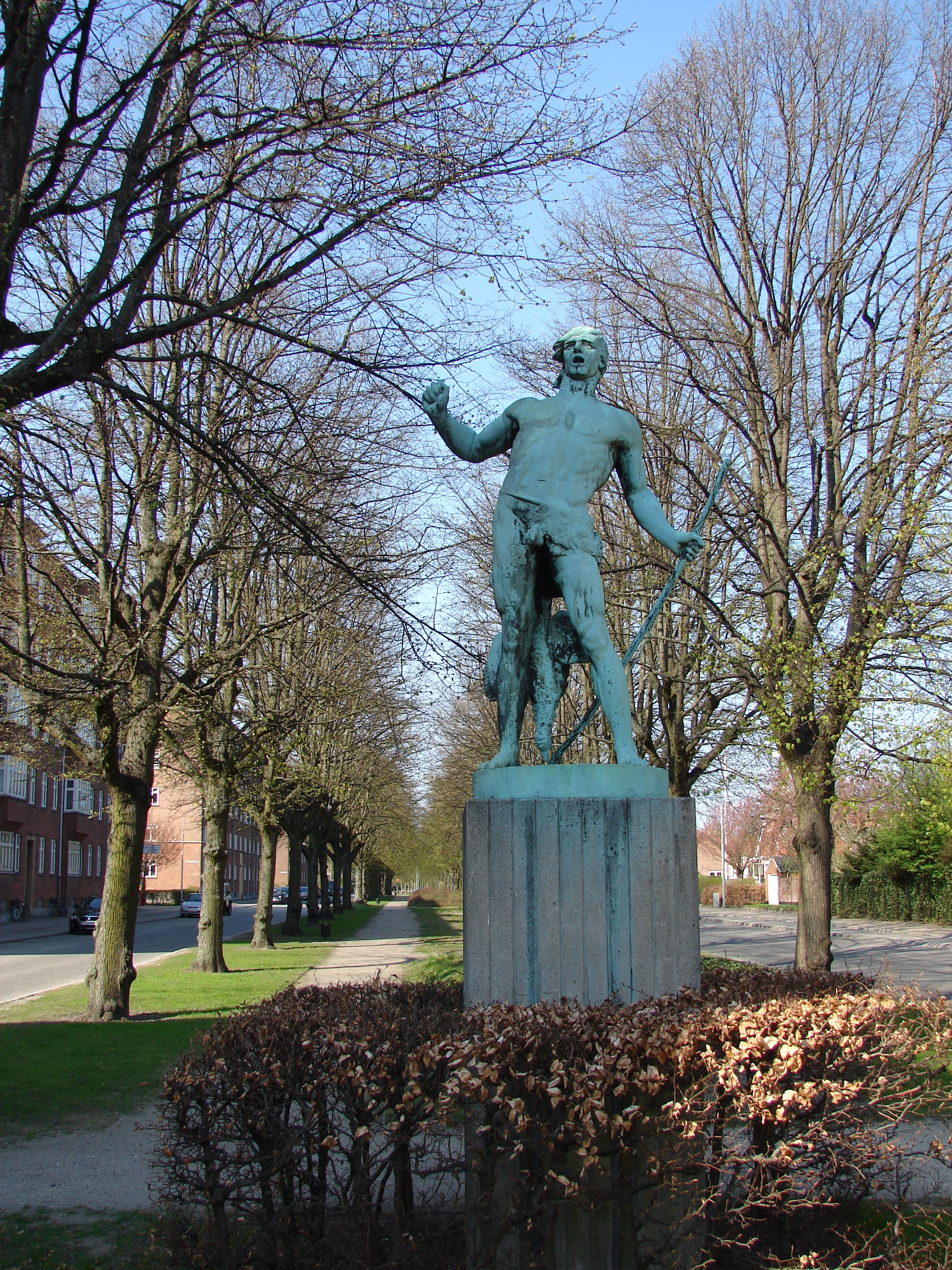
Ancient hunter
Frederiksberg

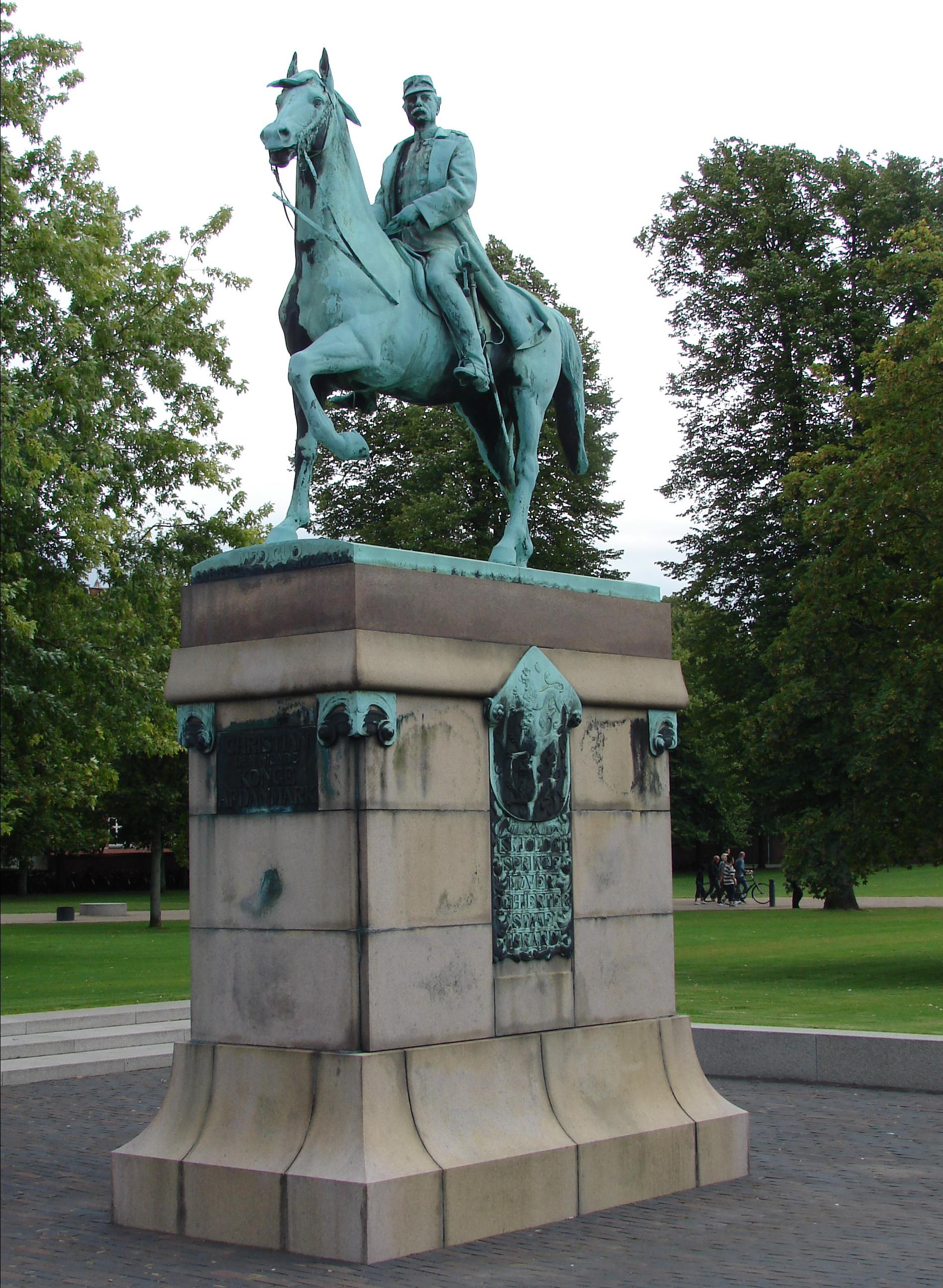
Christian IX
Odense
