= Johann Gottfried Becker (pharmacist, born 1639) =

Danish pharmacist (1639–1711)

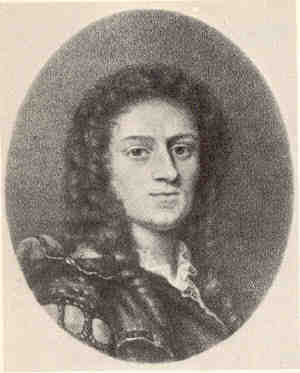
- Born: 7 October 1639; Husum, Duchy of Schleswig
- Died: 17 May 1711 (aged 71); Copenhagen, Denmark
- Occupation: Pharmacist
- Relatives: Gottfried Becker (son)

Johann Gottfried Becker (7 October 1639 – 17 May 1711) was a Danish pharmacist. He served as court pharmacist for Frederick III and opened the Elephant Pharmacy on Købmagergade in Copenhagen in 1670.

== Early life and education ==
Becker was born in Husum, the son of principal Gottfried Becker (1600–1652) by his first wife Elisabeth Ehrenreich (died 1645). He apprenticed as a pharmacist in Flensburg from 1655 and stayed there for six years. He then went on a study trip to Türol but returned to Denmark in 1664, where he stayed with his brother in Odense for about a year. He then went on another study trip to Germany, Italy, and Vienna.

== Career ==
In 1668 Becker was called home to Denmark to serve as court pharmacist for Frederick III. He had been recommended for the position by Giuseppe Francesco Borri. On 15 May 1669, he was granted a license to open a new pharmacy in Copenhagen. He opened Elefant Apotek on Købmagergade on 21 March the following year. Becker also served as a field pharmacist and accompanied the army to Scania in 1670.

Becker was recognized as an eminent chemist and carried out numerous scientific experiments in his laboratory, often in collaboration with Thomas Bartholin, who praised him in several of his publications.

He published Mithridaticum damocrateum in 1671 and Desriptio Theriacae coelestis in 1704, and contributed to Apotekertaksten in 1672.

In 1708, Becker passed his pharmacy on to his son Gottfried Becker (1681–1750). In 1740, he was appointed assessor in Collegium medicum and in 1749 to kammerassessorer.

== Personal life ==
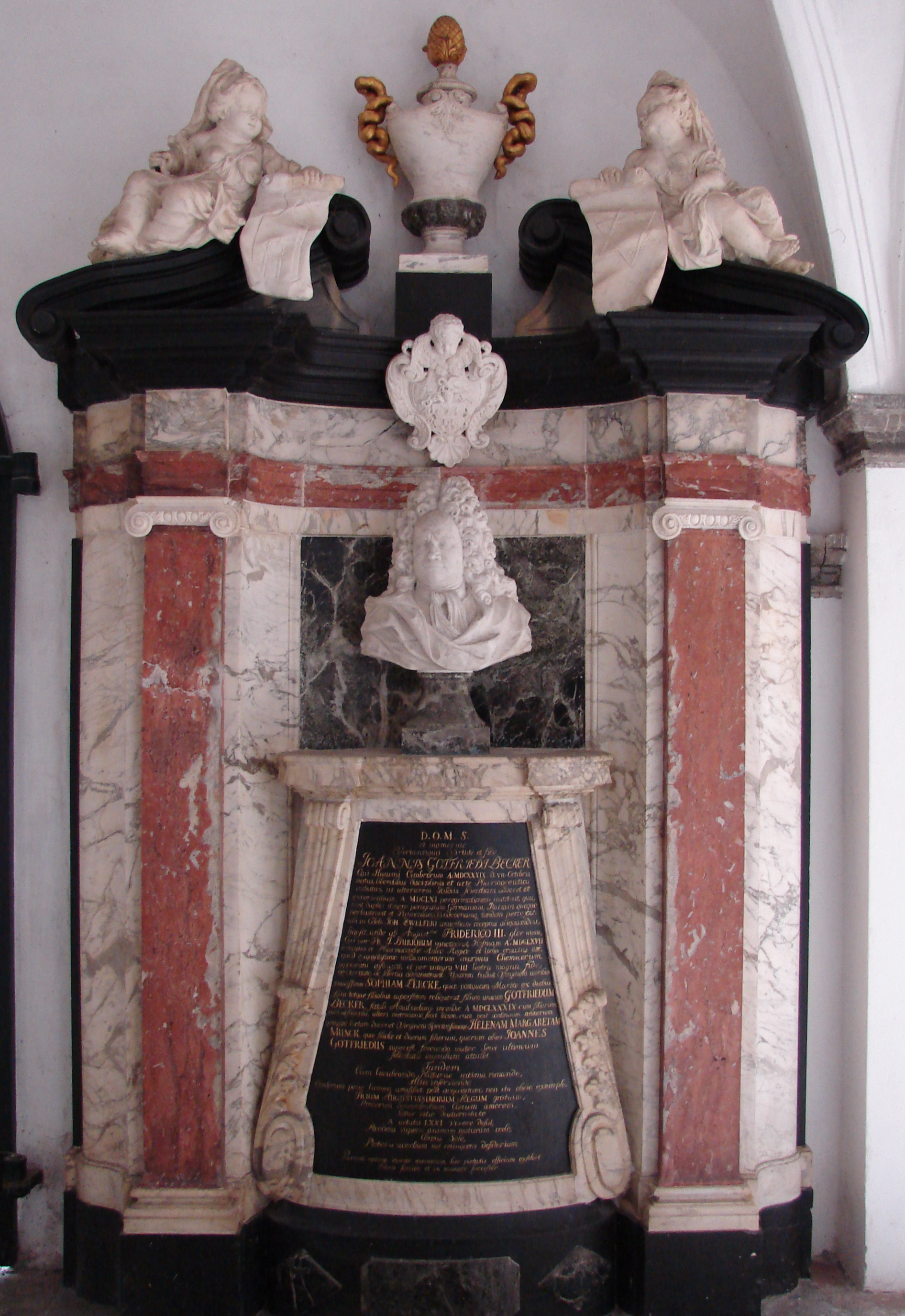
Becker's resting place in St. Peter's Church in Copenhagen

Becker was engaged to Sophia Heerfordt, a daughter of royal pharmacist Christopher Heerfordt, but she died in 1670 shortly before the wedding. He married Sophie Iversdatter (Bath) on 11 December 1671 in Copenhagen. She was killed in the fire of Sophie Amalienborg on 19 April 1689.

He later married Helene Margrethe Munk (died 26 July 1725) on 1 May 1694.

Becker died in 1711 and is buried at St. Peter's Church. His widow married county governor (amtmand) Hans Seidelin in 1713.
