= Nomeco =

Danish pharmaceutical company

Nomeco A/S
- Type: A/S
- Industry: Pharmeceutical
- Headquarters: Copenhagen, Denmark
- Area served: Denmark
- Key people: Henrik Kaastrup (CEO)
- Services: Wholesale
- Revenue: DKK 5.926.025 billion (2014)
- Net income: DKK 84.877 million (2014)
- Number of employees: C. 700
- Parent: Phoenix Pharmahandel
- Website: www.nomeco.dk

Nomeco, a wholly owned subsidiary of Phoenix Group, is the largest wholesaler of pharmaceutical products in Denmark. The company is headquartered in Copenhagen and is building a 20,000 square metre Nordic logistics centre in Køge which is expected to open in 2017.

== History ==
Nomeco was founded in 1991, through the merger of Mecobenzon A/S (founded 1919) and Nordisk Droge og Kemikalie A/S (founded 1903). In 1998, the company was merged with Finnish Tamro Oyj, the largest wholesaler of pharmaceutical products in the Nordic and Baltic countries. In 2000, Phoenix Pharmahandel became the largest shareholder of the company with 33.7% of the shares and in 2005, the company acquired full ownership. In August 2015, it was announced that Nomeco will build a new Nordic logistics centre for pharmaceuticals in Køge south of Copenhagen.

== Company ==
Nomeco is headquartered in the South Harbour area of Copenhagen. The new logistics centre for pharmaceuticals in Køge will cover 20,000 square metres and be located in Skandinavisk Transport Center. Will open in the summer of 2018.

The company is Denmark's largest distributor of pharmaceuticals and other products that promote health and well-being. Nomeco's wide range of services include various information logistics, marketing, sales and registration expert services. Pharmaceutical distribution is Nomeco's core business. Nomeco's customers are pharmaceutical companies, pharmacies, hospitals and retailers.

== See also ==
- Pharmakon—Danish College of Pharmacy Practice
