= Phoenix Pharmahandel =

Largest pharmaceutical wholesaler in Germany, based in Mannheim

Phoenix Group
- Type: Societas Europaea
- Industry: Pharmaceuticals, logistics
- Founded: 1994
- Founder: Adolf Merckle
- Headquarters: Mannheim, Germany
- Key people: Sven Seidel (CEO); Helmut Fischer (CFO)
- Revenue: €49.7 billion (2024/2025)
- Operating income: €608.05 million EBIT (2024/2025)
- Net income: €370.15 million (2024/2025)
- Total assets: €15.1 billion
- Total equity: €3.8 billion
- Number of employees: 48,939 (2024/2025)
- Website: www.phoenixgroup.eu

Phoenix Pharma SE (Phoenix Group), headquartered in Mannheim, Baden-Württemberg, is the largest pharmaceutical wholesaler in Europe, with over 200 distribution centers across Europe delivering drugs to approximately 3,300 own and about 18,000 independent Pharmacies in 17 European countries. Its Phoenix Documentation is an internet-based archive offering detailed information on drugs, their components, indications, and effects. The formation of holding company Phoenix International Beteiligungs GmbH took place. The Phoenix Group is a majority owner of the pharmaceutical wholesalers Purus A.S. in the Czech Republic and Tamro in Finland. The Phoenix Group itself is mostly owned by the pharmaceutical conglomerate Merckle Group.

== History ==
The Phoenix Pharmahandel Aktiengesellschaft & Co was founded from the German regional wholesalers F. Reichelt AG (Hamburg), Otto Stumpf GmbH (Berlin), Ferd. Schulze GmbH (Mannheim), Otto Stumpf AG (Nuremberg), and Hageda AG (Cologne) in early 1994. The newly established enterprise has achieved a market leading position in its home markets from day one. Only one year later in 1995, the company brand Phoenix was established and a major strategy roll-out throughout Germany, Hungary, Italy and the Netherlands was initiated: During this process Phoenix acquired majority shareholdings in the Hungarian pharma wholesaling company Parma Rt., the Northern Italian pharmaceutical wholesaler Comifar S.p.A., 60-per cent shareholding in the second-largest Dutch pharmaceutical wholesaler ACF Holding NV, based in Maarssen near Utrecht.

In 1996, the Phoenix Group already achieved a group-wide turnover exceeding EUR 10 billion for the first time in its history. Following this achievement, further acquisitions in Italy, the Czech Republic and Hungary were completed to strengthen the market position. In addition, new branches were established in Poland and France. Several problems in Poland and Hungary triggered a country-exclusive restructuring process in 1997 and was accompanied by a 100% takeover of the Austrian company Hestag and the renaming of Schulze Pharma France in Phoenix Pharma during the same year.

The entry into the United Kingdom market occurred in 1998 with the establishment of 11 distribution centres, a wholesale network with almost nationwide coverage. In the same year, Phoenix Group also acquired the regional wholesalers L. Rowland & Co. and Philip Harris Medical to establish a Phoenix presence in the UK, with the aim of establishing a third significant player in the pharmaceutical distribution industry, alongside AAH/Lloyds and Unichem/Moss. The Rowlands estate comprised approximately 70 pharmacies in November 2011.

In 2000, the number of employees across the group exceeded 10,000 for the first time and the company acquired the Finnish Tamro Group in April with a 33.7% stake. In the year 2002, Phoenix Pharmahandel AG & Co KG merged with Ferd. Schulze GmbH Co., subsequently its number of employees across the group exceeded 15,000 for the first time with a group-wide turnover of more than EUR 15 billion. Two years later, Phoenix received title to all shares of Tamro Corporation in May 2004 and subsequently acquired a 100% shareholding in Tamro: It was the largest acquisition in the history of Phoenix successfully to date; Tamro was delisted from the Helsinki Stock Exchange in the same year. In 2006, the group-wide turnover exceeds EUR 20 billion for the first time.

In July 2011, the rating agency Standard & Poor's upgraded Phoenix's rating from B+ to BB− with continuing positive outlook. In August, the rating agency Moody's raised the outlook for PHOENIX from "stable" to "positive". In October, the rating agency Fitch issued a rating for Phoenix of "BB" with a "stable" outlook. In May 2013, Phoenix group has issued a corporate bond with a volume of EUR 300 million (May).

In 2016, the Dutch Brocacef Groep, a joint venture between Phoenix and Celesio (McKesson Europe), takes over around 500 Mediq pharmacies and thus occupies a leading market position in the Netherlands. In 2018, the Romanian pharmaceutical wholesaler Farmexim and the nationwide pharmacy chain Help Net Farma were taken over.

In 2006, the group-wide turnover exceeds EUR 25 billion.

== Today ==
Today Phoenix Group has 161 distribution centers in 27 European countries from which it supplies drugs and other health products to pharmacies and medical institutions.

Phoenix Group also operates more than 2,700 own pharmacies within 15 countries, the majority under the corporate brand BENU.

In addition to Norway, the United Kingdom, the Netherlands, and Switzerland, the company is also heavily represented in Hungary, the Czech Republic, Slovakia, Serbia, Montenegro, Romania, and the Baltic markets.

The around 20,000 pharmacy employees within Phoenix Group has more than 60 million customer contacts each year.

== Business areas ==
- Wholesale
- Retail
- Pharma services

== International ==
Phoenix Group is operational in these countries with the respective brands:

=== Wholesale ===
| Albania | Phoenix Pharma SH.P.K. |
| Austria | Phoenix Arzneiwarengroßhandlung GmbH |
| Bosnia and Hercegovina | Phoenix Pharma d.o.o |
| Bulgaria | Phoenix Pharma EOOD |
| Croatia | Phoenix Farmacija d.o.o. and Phoenix Plus d.o.o |
| Czech Republic | Phoenix lékárenský velkoobchod |
| Denmark | Nomeco |
| Estonia | Tamro Baltics |
| Finland | Tamro |
| France | Phoenix Pharma SAS |
| Germany | Phoenix Pharmahandel Aktiengesellschaft & Co KG |
| Hungary | Phoenix Pharma Gyógyszerkereskedelmi Zrt. |
| Ireland | United Drug |
| Italy | Comifar Group |
| Kosovo | Phoenix Pharma SH.P.K. |
| Latvia | Tamro Baltics |
| Lithuania | Tamro Baltics |
| Macedonia | Phoenix Pharma DOOEL and EL Pharma DOOEL |
| Montenegro | Farmegra and Evropa Lek |
| Netherlands | Brocacef Groep NV |
| Norway | Apotek 1 |
| Poland | Phoenix Pharma Polska |
| Romania | Farmexim |
| Serbia | Phoenix Pharma d.o.o |
| Slovakia | Phoenix Zdravotnícke zásobovanie |
| Sweden | Tamro |
| Switzerland | Amedis-UE AG |
| United Kingdom | Phoenix Medical Supplies Limited |

=== Pharmacies ===
| Czech Republic | BENU |
| Estonia | BENU |
| Hungary | BENU |
| Ireland | McCabe's Pharmacy |
| Latvia | BENU |
| Lithuania | BENU |
| Netherlands | BENU |
| Montenegro | Apoteka Lijek PZU |
| Romania | HelpNet |
| Serbia | BENU |
| Switzerland | BENU |
| Slovakia | BENU |
| United Kingdom | Rowlands |
