= Alfred Benzon (1855–1932) =

Danish businessman

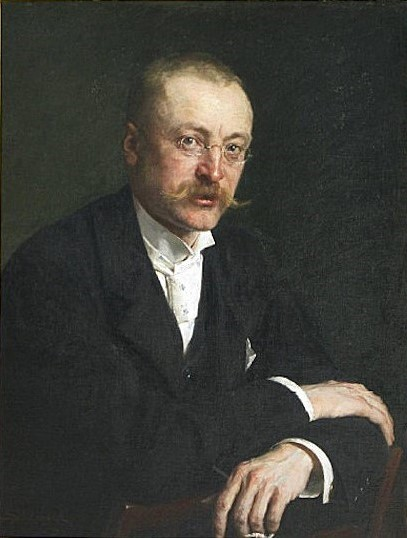
- Benzon painted by P. S. Krøyer
- Born: 7 February 1855; Copenhagen, Denmark
- Died: 2 May 1932 (aged 77); Copenhagen, Denmark
- Occupation: Businessman
- Known for: Alfred Benzon A/S

Alfred Benzon (17 January 1855 – 21 May 1932) was a Danish pharmacist, businessman and politician. He was responsible for the considerable expansion of the family's pharmaceutical company Alfred Benzon A/S. He was also the proprietor of the Swan Pharmacy in Copenhagen. He chaired the Pharmaceutical Society of Denmark from 1894 until 1926. He was also active in politics, both as a member of the Copenhagen City Council from 1896 to 1908 and the Danish parliament from 1901 to 1903.

== Early life and education ==
Benzon was born on 17 January 1855 in Copenhagen, the son of Alfred Benzon (1823–1884) and Anna D. V. Østergaard (1823–1893). Benzon's father had acquired the Svane Apotek in Copenhagen in 1849 and constructed a chemical factory at Kalvebod Beach in 1863.

Benzon matriculated from Haderslev Grammar School in 1873 and was then trained as a pharmacist in his father's pharmacy in Copenhagen until 1875. He earned the cand. pharm. degree in 1877 and then went on to study chemistry at the College of Advanced Technology as well as business. He was also a student at Peder Severin Krøyer's drawing school and was several times represented with marine paintings at the Charlottenborg Spring Exhibitions.

== Career ==
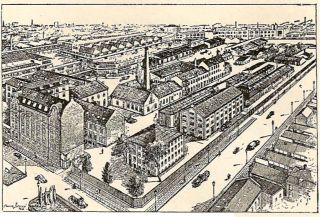
Alfred Benzon's site at Halmtorvet in Copenhagen

On their father's death in 1884, Benzon and his younger brother Otto Benzon became the new owners of both Svane Apotek and the growing pharmaceutical company as well as the pharmacy in Thorshavn. On his brother's death in 1927, he became the sole owner of the company. The factory in Vesterbro grew steadily under his management. In 1932, he ceded Svane Apotek to his nephew Niels Benzon (1893–1975).

He was also a board member of a number of prominent companies, including De forenede Bryggerier (chairman), Den kgl. porcelænsfabrik, Privatbanken and a number of shipping companies.

== Politics and public offices ==
Benzon was a very active member of the Pharmaceutical Society of Denmark (Apotekerforeningen) from 1892. He was president of the association from 1894 to 1926. He was a driving force behind the preparations for the new Pharmacy Act of 1913, which replaced a royal resolution from 1672. He was also a member of a number of government commissions, including the Pharmaceutical Commission (Medicinalkommissionen) of 1909. He acted as a consultant on trade and industry matters to the Minister of Justice during the First World War (1914–1918).

Benzon was a member of the Copenhagen City Council from 1896 to 1908. He was elected on an independent list (borgerlisten), but collaborated with the liberal opposition. From 1901 to 1903, he was a member of the Danish parliament (venstrereformpartiet) in Copenhagen's 2nd constituency. From 1904 to 1925, he was a member of Copenhagen's Port Council.

== Sports ==
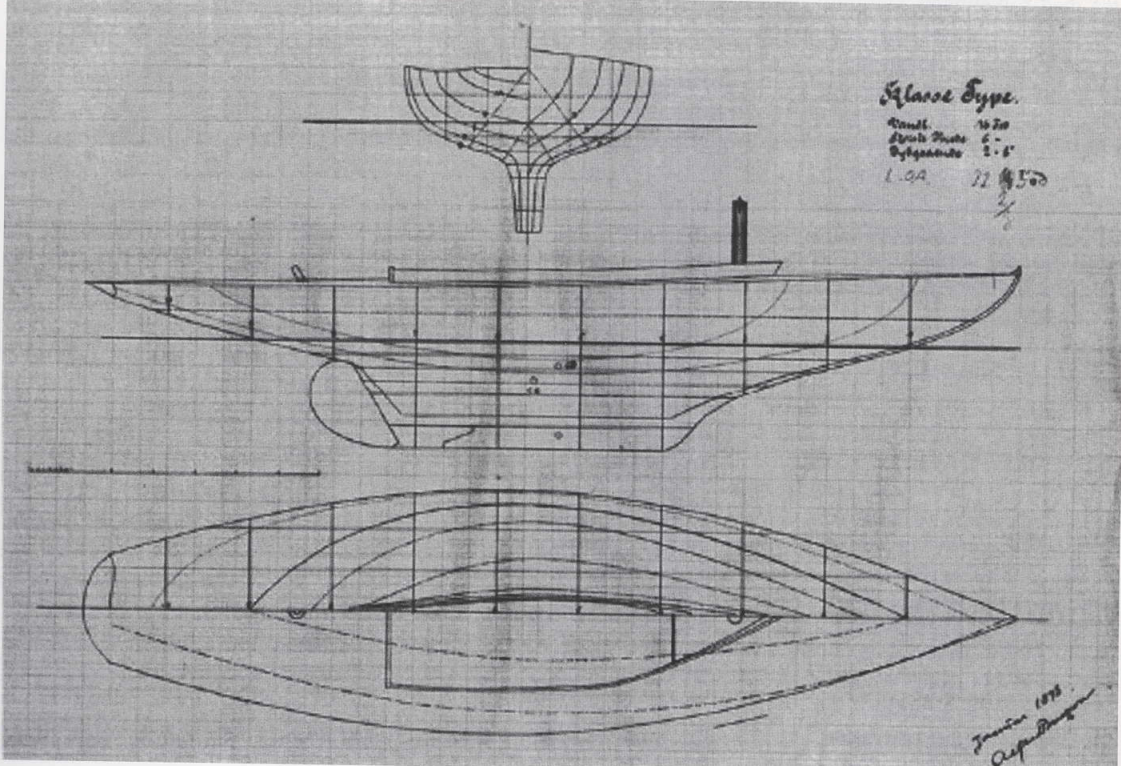
One of Benzon's renderings of the boat Ællingen

Benzon was interested in rowing and sailing from an early age and later also ice skating and horse riding. Starting in 1872, he participated in numerous sailing competitions in Denmark, England and Germany. He also engaged in designing his own boats, including Ællingen (The Duckling) in 1898. From 1894 to 1904, he was vice president of the Royal Danish Yacht Club. In 1894, he became a member of the International Yacht Racing Union in London and he was a member of its permanent committee from its incorporation in 1907.

== Personal life ==
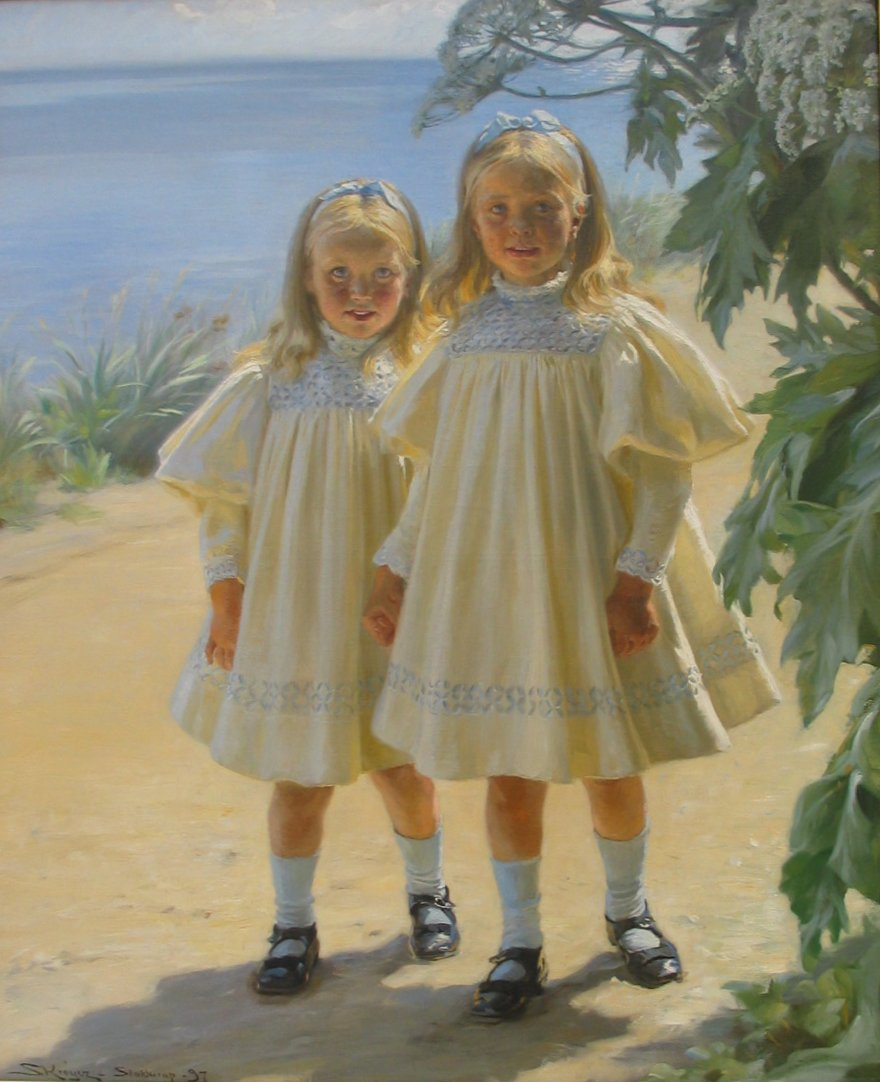
P. S. Krøyer's painting of Benzon's daughters Elise and Hanne, 1897

On 26 May 1888, Benzon married Johanna (Hanne) Bissen (4 July 1862 – 15 February 1930) in the Church of Our Lady in Copenhagen. She was a daughter of the prominent sculptor Vilhelm Bissen (1836–1913) and Johanne V. Michelsen (1836–1862). Their children included the pharmacist Bøje Benzon.

Erik Henningsen painted a portrait painting of him in 1880 and Peder Severin Krøyer painted another one in 1898. He is also one of the men seen in Krøyer's monumental 1904 oil on canvas group portrait painting Men of Industry (Frederiksborg Museum). Other depictions of him includes a caricature by Axel Thiess in Klods-Hans (1900 and 1908). Herman Vedel painted a portrait painting of him in 1927 (Pharmaceutical Society of Denmark).

Benzon died on 21 May 1932 in Copenhagen and is buried in Taarbæk Cemetery. He was survived by three children: his son Bøje and daughters Elise and Hanne Benzon,

== Accolades ==
Benzon was created a Knight in the Order of the Dannebrog in 1894 and a Knight in the Order of the Dannebrog in 1916. He was awarded the Cross of Honour in 1913.
