= Johann Gottfried Burman Becker =

Danish pharmacist and writer (1802–1880)

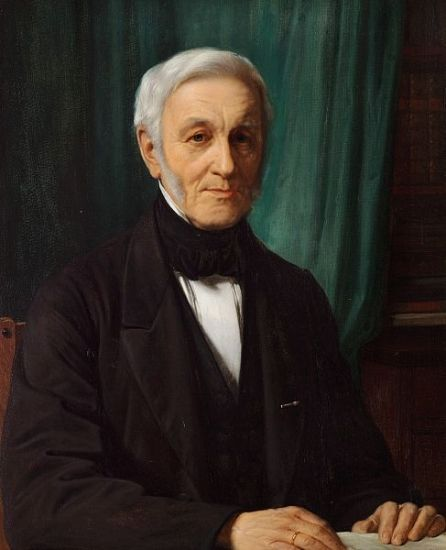
Johann Gottfried Burman Becker

Johann Gottfried Burman Becker (26 April 1802 – 6 October 1880) was a Danish pharmacist, historical writer and collector and illustrator.

== Early life ==
Becker was born in Copenhagen, the son of court pharmacist Gottfried Becker (1767–1845) and Nicolette A. Burman (1774–1824). On 1 March 1825, he was granted royal permission to assume the family name Burman Becker. In 1822, he passed the preliminary exams in philology and philosophy at the University of Copenhagen. He was trained as a pharmacist in his father's Royal Court Pharmacy while at the same time attending lectures by F. G. Howitz, H. C. Ørsted, W. C. Zeise and J. W. Hornemann. In 1825, he passed the pharmaceutical exam. He then went on a longer journey abroad to continue his education, visiting Germany, Switzerland, France and England.

== Career ==
On his return to Copenhagen in 1828, he began working his father's pharmacy. He also wrote a guide to lecturing in chemical analysis (1829). His dissertation Analysis duorum fossilium earned him a doctoral degree from the University of Jena. Becker succeeded his father as court pharmacist in 1843. In 1844, he was a co-founder of the Danish Association of Pharmacists. In 1845, he sold the pharmacy to focus on his other interests.

== Historical interests ==
Becker spent the rest of his life engaging in the study of a wide range of historical subjects. His publications included Efterretninger om de gamle Borge i Danmark og Hertugdømmerne I-III (1830–32) and Forsøg til en Beskrivelse af og Efterretning om vævede Tapeter og andre mærkelige Vægdecorationer i Danmark (1863, 2nd edition 1878).

== Personal life ==
In the Garrison Church on 24 November 1830, Becker married Anna Margaretha Baden (1809–1832), daughter of professor Torkel Baden (1765–1849) and Sophie P. Olrik (1771–1840). After her early death, Becker married her sister Jacobe Baden (1810–1874) on 8 November 1835 in the Garrison Church. He owned Kollekolle at Farum from 1847 until 1860. He died on 6 October 1880 and is buried at the Garrison Cemetery in Copenhagen.
