= Christopher Heerfordt =

Danish Pharmacist and Botanist

Christopher Heerfordt (1609 – 29 June 1679) was a Danish pharmacist and botanist of Hungarian origin. He established the pharmacy Svane Apiotek in Copenhagen in 1660.

== Biography ==
Heerfordt was born in Schlossdorff in present day Hungary. He is first mentioned in Denmark in 1634 when he is granted a property in Nykøbing Falster, but was probably by then already court pharmacist for Prince Christian, a position he held until the dissolution of the court in 1652. In 1656 he was granted a royal license to open a pharmacy in Nykøbing Falster (Løbe Apotek). The following year he also opened a pharmacy in Nakskov. In 1660 he obtained a royal license to open Svane Apotek in Copenhagen and ceded his pharmacies in Nykøbing and Nakskov to two sons-in-law. Svaneapotek was then located in the no longer existing street Højbrostræde.

He passed Svane Apotek on to a son by the same name in 1873. He died in Nykøbing Falster on 29 June 1679.

== Legacy ==
Heerfordt created a herbarium with 343 sheets which is now kept in the Danish Museum of Natural History. Herbarium Danicum sempervivum, a collection of painted illustrations of 140 plants created at Heerfordt's initiative by two foreign artists, is now kept by the Royal Danish Library. Both works, as well as a third one with plants from Brazil, were gifts from him to Frederick III in c. 1656.

Herbarium was also involved in the collection of material for Peder Lauridsen Kylling's Viridarium Danicum from 1670. He also sponsored the posthumous publication of Anders Arrebo's left sermons, Torcular Christi.
