= Gottfried Becker (pharmacist, born 1681) =

Danish pharmacist (1681–1750)

- Born: 24 January 1681; Copenhagen, Denmark
- Died: 19 February 1750 (aged 69); Copenhagen, Denmark
- Occupation: Pharmacist

Gottfried Becker (1681–1750) was a Danish pharmacist. He owned Elefant Apotek in Købmagergade in Copenhagen from 1708 and served as royal court pharmacist from 1712.

== Early life and education ==
Becker was born in Copenhagen on 24 January 1681, the eldest son of pharmacist Johann Gottfried Becker and Sophie Iversdatter Bath. His two younger brothers and two younger sisters did not survive childhood. His father was the owner of Elefant Apotek in Købmagergade. Becker was taught the trade by his father and then continued his studies abroad in 1702–5.

== Career ==
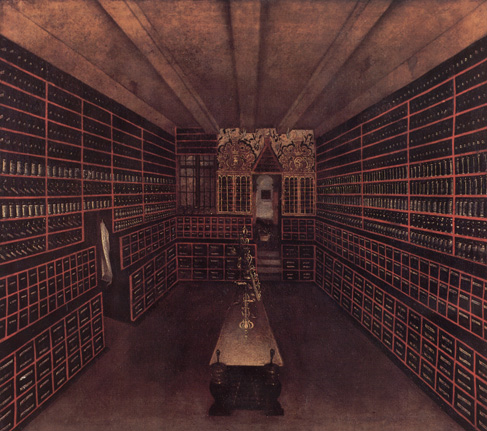
Baqoue-style interior from Elefant Apotek

In 1708 Becker took over the pharmacy in Købmagergade after his father. He was appointed to field pharmacist (feltapoteker) in 1709 and accompanied the army to first Scania and later Pommerania. He was present with his field pharmacy at the Battle of Gadebusch in 1712. Later that same year, he was appointed royal court pharmacist. His pharmacy in Købmagergade was completely destroyed in the Copenhagen Fire of 1728 but reopened in a new building in 1737. He was also engaged in large-scale trade with other goods. He was appointed to Kammerassessors in 1749,

== Personal life ==
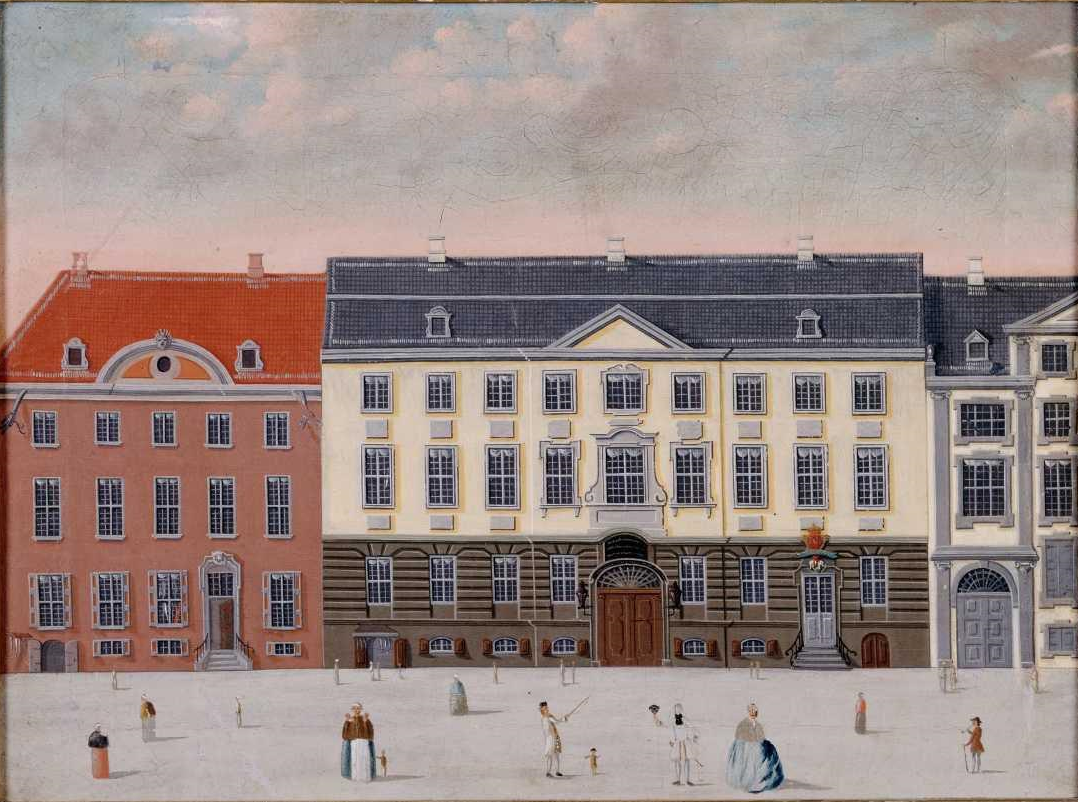
Becker's home in Købmagergade painted by Johannes Rach & Hans Eegborg in 1749 with the pharmacy just visible to the right

6 May 1712, Becker married Cathrine Schupp (10 August 1693 – 30 June 1713), a daughter of merchant Christian Schupp, but she died in June the next year, just one week after giving birth to their first child, Johan Christian Becker (23 June 1713 – 3+ April 1755). Becker married a second time Johanna Heinricca Nørck (28 October 1694 – 31 January 1765), a daughter of merchant Johan Heinrich Nørck, on 14 October 1714. They had 16 children, of which four girls and three boys survived to adulthood.

The family lived in a large house next to the pharmacy in Købmagergade. He died on 19 February 1750. His widow then operated the pharmacy until 1756, when it was passed on to their son Johan Gottfried Becker (17 July 1723 – 20 April 1790).
