= H. Nielsen's Tobacco Factory =

Tobacco factory in Odense, Denmark

H. Nielsen's Tobacco Factory (Danish: H. Nielsens Tobaksfabrik) is a former tobacco factory at Brogade 6 in Odense, Denmark. The Italian Renaissance Revival style building is from 1887.

== History ==
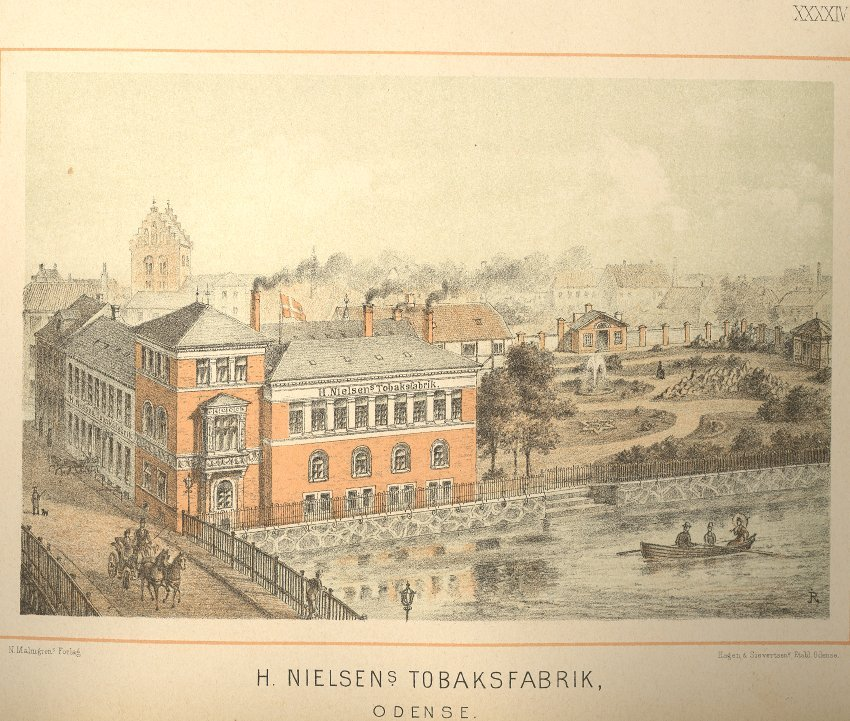
H. Nielsen's Tobacco Factory, c. 1888

The company was established in rented premises in 1868 and comprised a tobacco shop. Nielsen was after a while able to buy the building as well as the one next door. A new tobacco factory was constructed at the site in 1887. The two-storey building was 37 alen long and 23 alen wide. The factory closed in the first half of the 20th century when the number of tobacco factories in Odense declined from 10 to 2.

== Legacy ==
The former tobacco factory is located at Brogade 7. The building is designed in Italian Renaissance Revival style.

H. Nielsen's Tobacco Factory is included in Danmarks Industrielle Etablissementer I-III, an illustrated work with descriptions of 107 Danish industrial enterprises published by N. Malmgren and his widow in 1878–1889.
