= Gustav Lotze A/S =

Danish pharmaceutical company

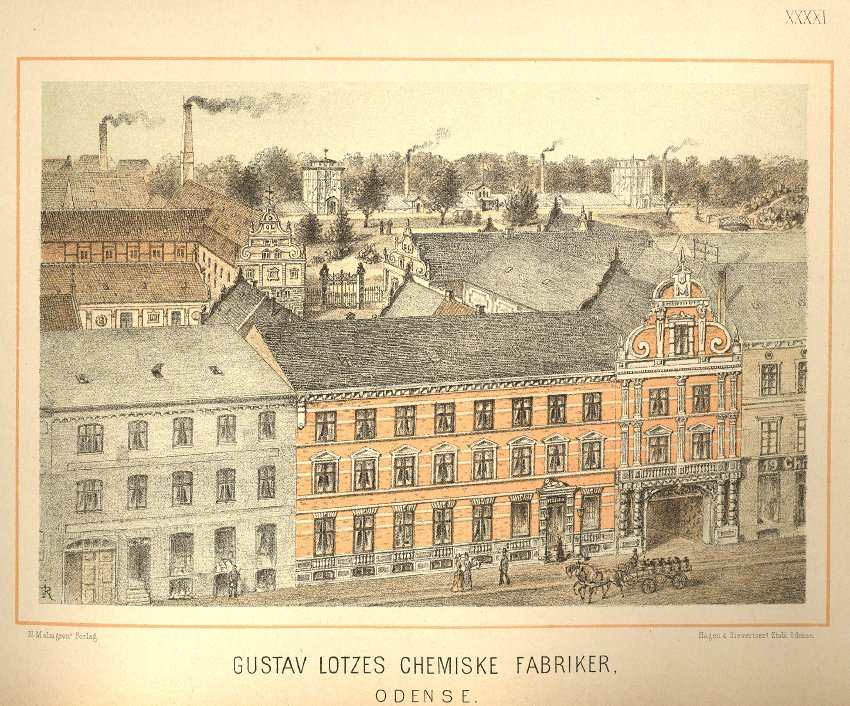
Gustav Lotze's chemiske Fabriker

Gustav Lotze A/S, also known as Gustav Lotze's chemiske Fabriker , was a pharmaceutical company based in Odense, Denmark-.

== History ==
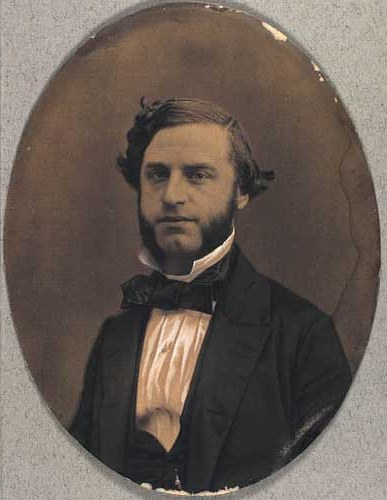
Gustav Lotze by L. Dinesen

The company was founded as a wholesale business in 1860 by pharmacist at the Løve Apotek in Odense Ernst Gustav Lotze (1825-1893). It supplied other pharmacies with a range of pharmaceuticals and chemical compinds which had until then been imported. Lotze cultivated medicinal plants for use in the production on a property outside Odense. The company was initially operated out of the Løve Apotek's building but Lotze was later able to expand the premises through the purchase of several of the adjacent building and a new factory was built at the site in 1887.

The company was converted into a limited company (aktieselskab) and acquired by Det Danske Medicinal- & Kemikalie-Kompagni A/S in 1919.

== See also ==
- H. Nielsen's Tobacco Factory
