= Gottfried Becker (pharmacist, born 1767) =

Danish pharmacist and academic (1767–1845)

Gottlieb Becker
- Portrait of Gottlieb Becker
- Born: 9 February 1767; Copenhagen, Denmark
- Died: 21 June 1845 (aged 78); Copenhagen, Denmark
- Occupations: Pharmacist and industrialist

Gottfried Becker (9 February 1767 – 21 June 1845) was a Danish pharmacist, professor and industrialist. He was the owner of Elefant Apotek on Købmagergade in Copenhagen.

== Early life and education ==
Becker was born in Copenhagen, the son of Johan Gottfried Becker (1723–90) and his wife Anna Christine Torm (1738–1809). His maternal grandfather was burgermeister and chief of police in Copenhagen Erik Torm. After completing secondary school and having been articled to his father's pharmacy for three years in 1786, Becker went to Germany, where he spent one year with the prominent druggist Johann Christian Wiegleb in Langensalza. After his return to Denmark, he took the pharmaceutical exam and then went on another journey abroad, studying chemistry with Antoine Lavoisier in Paris as well as botany and mineralogy.

== Career ==
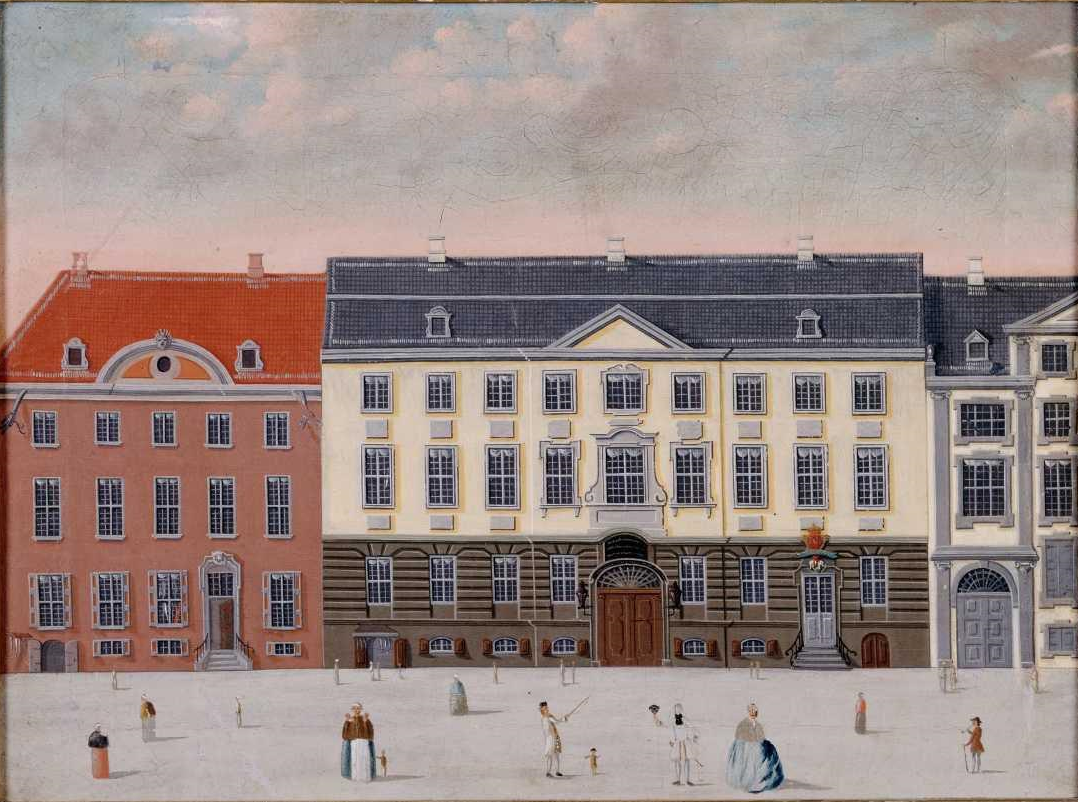
Vecker's house in Købmagergade with the entrance to the Elephant Pharmacy furthest to the right seen on a painting by Rach & Eegberg from 1749

After his father's death, he took over the Elephant Pharmacy (Elefantapoteket) on Købmagergade in Copenhagen. He was appointed court pharmacist in 1792 and became a lecturer in chemistry at the University of Copenhagen. In 1795, after journeys to Norway and the Netherlands, he was appointed professor chemiæ extraordinarius. From 1799 to 1844, he was assessor pharmaciæ.

He resigned as professor in 1806 due to hardness of hearing, a problem he had acquired in connection with a chemical experiment. In 1807, he established a dye factory. In 1809, he became a field pharmacist. He was also a member of a wide range of commissions and learned societies and the writer of several works on natural sciences. He ceded the Elephant Pharmacy to his son in 1844. He was appointed virkelig justitsråd in 1829 and etatsråd in 1842.

== Personal life ==
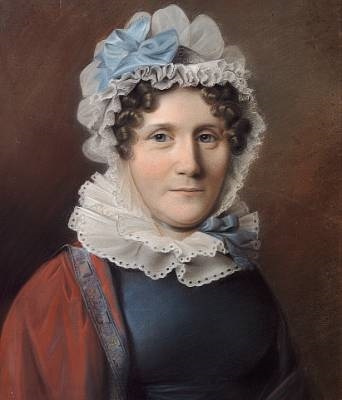
160px[Nicolette Adriane Burman

On 20 April 1794 in Amsterdam, he married Nicolette Adriane Burman (28 August 1774 in Amsterdam – 13 March 1824 in Copenhagen), a daughter of professor in botany Nicolaas Laurens Burman by his wife Anna Marie Verkolje (1753–1810). Their son, Johann Gottfried Burman Becker, was also a pharmacist as well as a writer on history.
