= Kongelig Hof Apotek =

- Type: Private
- Industry: Pharmaceutical products
- Founded: 1669
- Founder: Johan Gottfried Becker
- Headquarters: Copenhagen, Denmark
- Key people: Susanne Trøck-Nielsen

Kongelig Hof Apotek (lit. 'Royal Court Pharmacy') is a pharmacy located at Store Kongensgade 45 in central Copenhagen, Denmark.

== History ==
=== Købmagergade ===
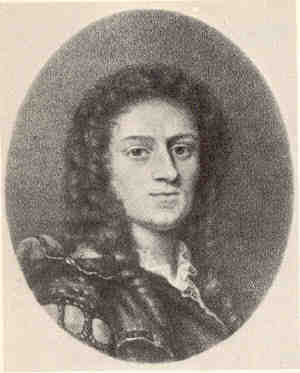
Johan Gotfried Becker: Founder of the pharmacy in 1669

The pharmacy was established by Johan Gottfried Becker on 15 May 1669. It opened on Købmagergade (now Købmagergade 9) on 21 March 1780 and was originally called the Elefant Pharmacy (Elephant Apotek). Becker had returned to Denmark the previous year to serve as court pharmacist for Frederick III.

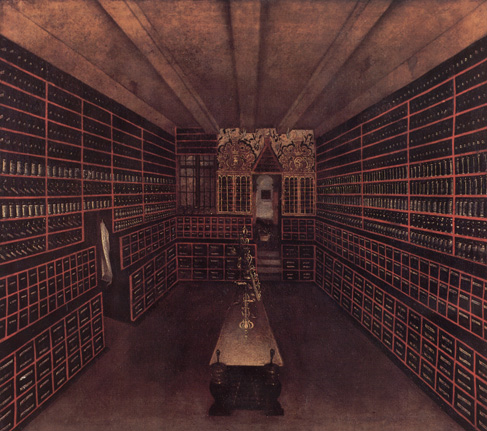
Baroque-style interior from Elefant Apotek

In 1708 Becker passed the pharmacy on to his son, Gottfried Becker, who succeeded his father as court pharmacist in 1712. The pharmacy was completely destroyed in the Copenhagen Fire of 1728. It was temporarily moved to Amagertorv until an extravagant new building at the old site could be inaugurated on 15 April 1737.

Gottfried Becker's widow Johanne Henrice, née Nørck continued the operations after her husband's death in 1750. In 1756, she ceded it to their son Johan Gottfried Becker. His son, Gottfried Becker, was the owner from 1802. Gotfried Becker was succeeded by his son Johan Gotfried Burman Becker.

=== Store Kongensgade 25 ===
In December 1845, Burman Becker sold the pharmacy to Lauritz Ørnstrup. In 1850 he moved it to a new building at Store Kongensgade 25. His widow Emilie Marie Chritine Ørnstrup née Muus was the owner from his death in 1863 to 1881.

=== Store Kongensgade 45 ===
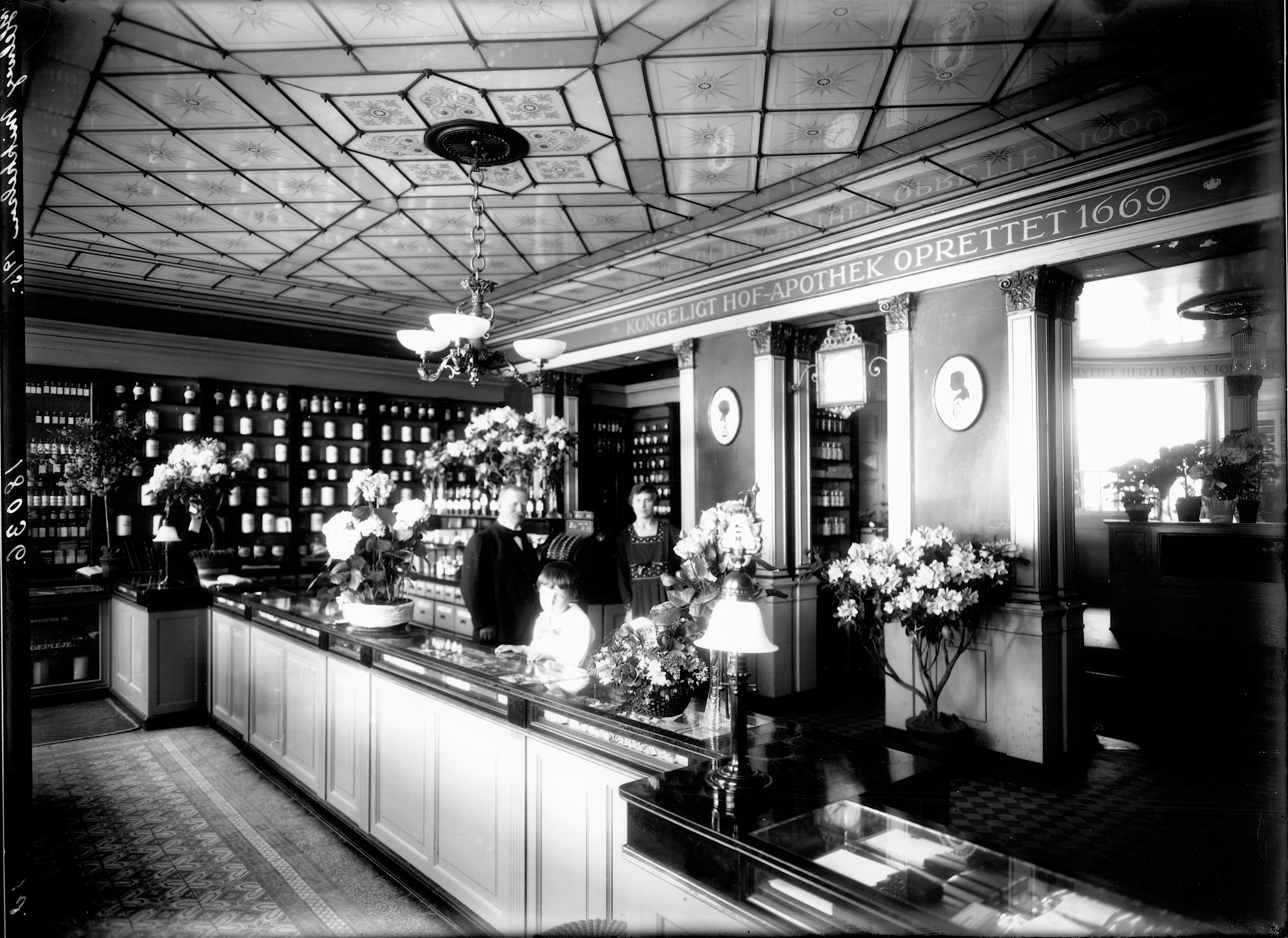
The interior of the pharmacy, 1919.

In July 1971, Nlødstrup Dahl took Niels Arne Helmgrün as a partner. The pharmacy was the next year moved to another building a little further down the street at No. 45-

The pharmacy moved to its current location at Store Kongensgade 45 in 1970.

== List of owners ==
- 15 May 1669 - 1708 Johann Gottfried Becker
- 1708 - 19 February 1750 Gotfried Becker
- 17 March 1750 - 10 December 1756 Johannes Heinrice Becker, née Nørck
- 22 October 1756 - 20 April 1790 Johan Gotfried Becker
- 15 February 1792 - 31 March 1844 Gottfried Becker
- 24 April 1844 - 31 December 1845 Johann Gottfried Burman Becker
- 23 December 1845 - 15 December 1863 Lauritz Ørnstrup
- 15 December 1863 - 31 March 1881 Emilie Marie Christine Ørnstrup, née Muus
- 6 April 1881 - 1 March 1888 Johan Martin Peter Ibsen

== Today ==
The pharmacy has been owned by Susanne Trøck-Nielsen since 1994.
