= Ny Østergade =

Street in Copenhagen, Denmark

- Length: 300 m (980 ft)
- Location: Copenhagen, Denmark
- Quarter: City centre
- Nearest metro station: Kongens Nytorv
- Coordinates: 55°40′51.6″N 12°34′58.8″E
- Southwest end: Østergade
- Northeast end: Christian X's Gade

Ny Østergade (lit. "New East Street") is a street in the Old Town of Copenhagen, Denmark, linking the Østergade section of the pedestrian street Strøget in the south with Christian IX's gade in the northwest. Together with the intersecting streets Grønnegade and Store Regnegade, its forms part of Copenhagen's most exclusive shopping districts.

== History ==
=== Peder Madsens Gang ===
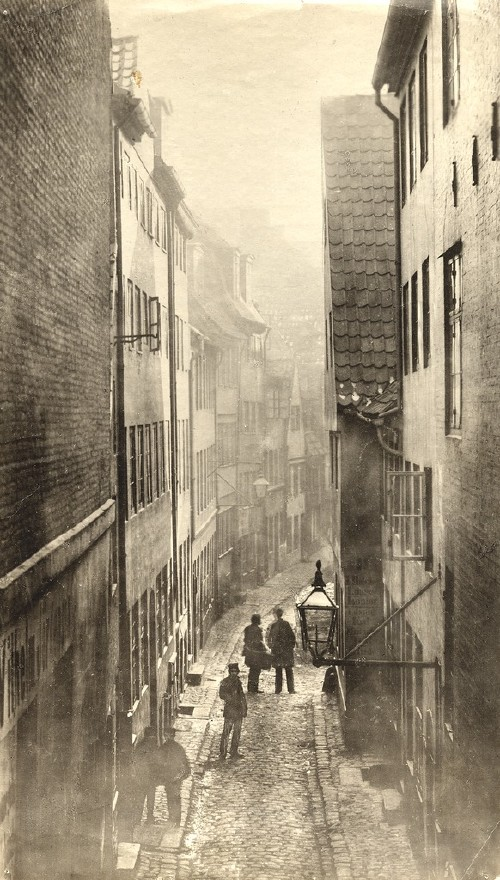
Peder Madsens Gang

Peder Madsens Gang ("Peder Madsen's Corridor"), a narrow alley with tenements for the very poor, was for centuries located at the site where Ny Østergade runs today. It took its name after Peder Madsen, a local representative and alderman of the Community Representative's Guild, who constructed some of the buildings. Later in the century, it was already described as the worst slum in the city. It was entered through a gate in the Svaneapoteket pharmacy on Østergade and at Grønnegade in the other end.

=== The new street ===
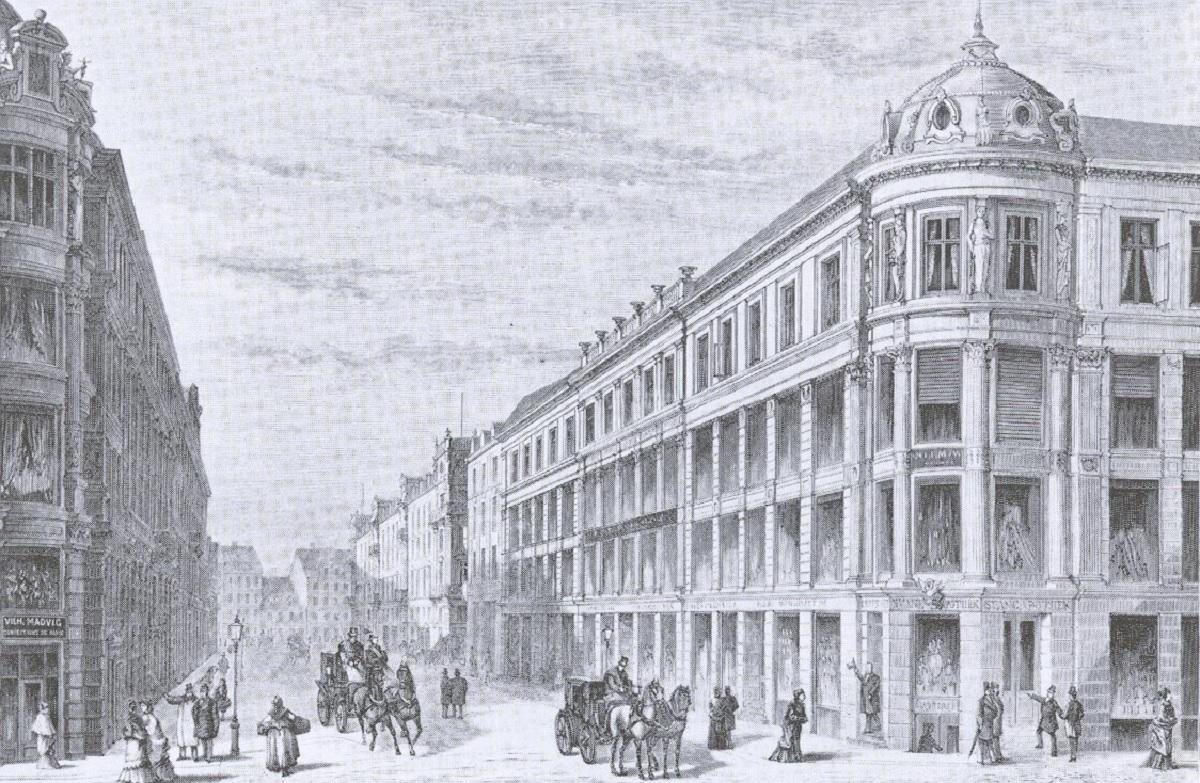
Ny Østergade, illustration from Illustreret Tidende

It was first proposed to clear the area in the 1840s but nothing happened. In September 1872, a committee was established. It received four proposals and the newly founded Kjøbenhavns Byggeselskab (Copenhagen Building Company) was ultimately charged with renewing the area. The new, wide street Ny Østergade was inaugurated in 1876.

== Notable buildings and residents ==
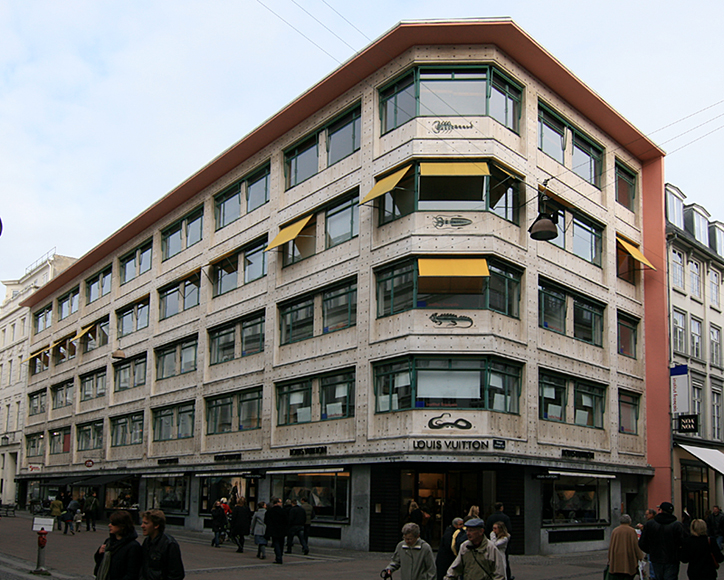
No. 2–4Svaneapoteket Pharmacy's former building

Built in 1732–1742, No. 11 is one of few buildings dating from before the street was created.

Many of the buildings along the street date from the 1870s when the street was created. A number of them were designed by Ove Petersen and Vilhelm Dahlerup, such as No. 5, No. 7 and No. 9. They also collaborated on the design of the Royal Danish Theatre. Dahlerup was also responsible for the adaption of Hotel D'Angleterre (Ny Østergade 6/Hovedvagtsgade 3/Kongens Nytorv 34). Some of the other, such as No. 8, No. 10, No. 12, was designed by Ludvig Fenger.

No. 19-21, No. 23 and the two buildings on the corner with Christian IXs Gade (Ny Østergade 25 / Christian IXs Gade 4-6 and Ny Østergade 34/Christian IXs Gade 8/Gothersgade 43) were designed by Eugen Jørgensen in 1906–10.

The Svaneapoteket Pharmacy's former building (Ny Østergade 2-4/Østergade 18) is from 1938 and was designed by Bent Helveg-;øller.

== See also ==
- Palægade
