= Otto Benzon =

Danish writer and poet (1856–1927)

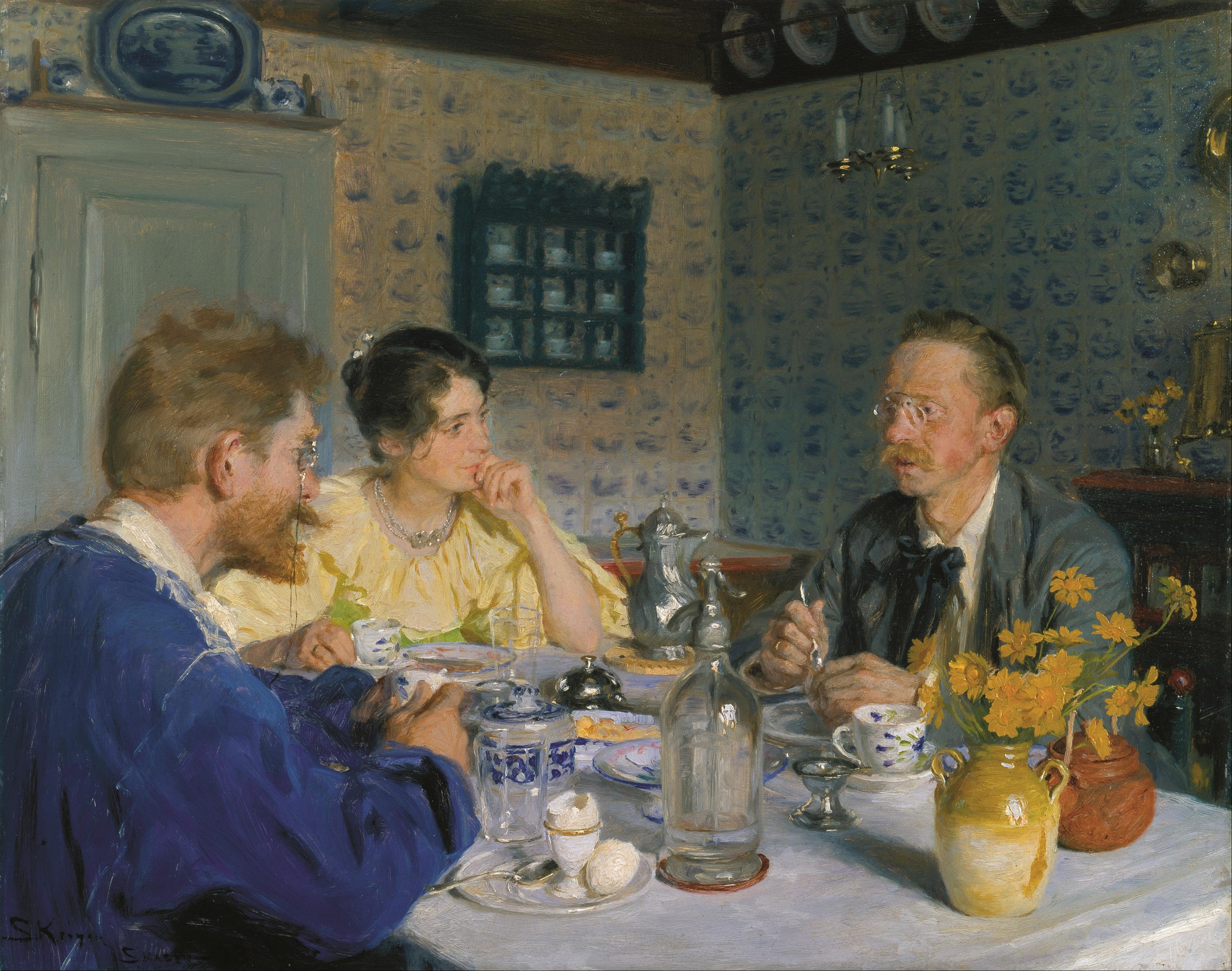
Otto Benzon with the artist P. S. Krøyer and his wife, 1893 (Hirschsprung Collection)

Otto Benzon (17 January 1856 – 16 May 1927) was a Danish writer and poet, remembered outside of his country as the lyricist of a dozen or so art songs by Edvard Grieg.

== Publications ==
- A Regular scandal (1886, drama)
- Sportsmænd (1891, drama)
- Anna Bryde (1894, drama)
- Surrogater (1896, drama)
- Moderate Løjer (1900, drama)
- Tilfældigheder (1905, drama)
- En Skandale (1906)
- Forældre (1907)
- Provisorisk (1907)
- Frie Hænder (1908)
- Foraar og Efteraar (1914, drama)
