= Phyllonorycter jozanae =

Scientific classification
- Kingdom: Animalia
- Phylum: Arthropoda
- Class: Insecta
- Order: Lepidoptera
- Family: Gracillariidae
- Genus: Phyllonorycter
- Species: P. jozanae

Binomial name
- Phyllonorycter jozanae (Kumata, 1967)

Synonyms
- Lithocolletis jozanae Kumata, 1967; Phyllonorycter pinnatifidella (Kuznetzov, 1979)

Species of moth

Phyllonorycter jozanae is a moth of the family Gracillariidae. It is known from Hokkaidō island in Japan and from the Russian Far East.

The wingspan is 6–7 mm.

The larvae feed on Crataegus species, including Crataegus chlorosarca, Crataegus jozana, Crataegus maximowiczii and Crataegus pinnatifida. They mine the leaves of their host plant.
