= Crataegus × dsungarica =

Scientific classification
- Kingdom: Plantae
- Clade: Tracheophytes
- Clade: Angiosperms
- Clade: Eudicots
- Clade: Rosids
- Order: Rosales
- Family: Rosaceae
- Genus: Crataegus
- Species: C. × dsungarica

Binomial name
- Crataegus × dsungarica Zabel ex Lange

Species of hawthorn

Crataegus × dsungarica is a hawthorn that is a hybrid between C. songarica in C. sect. Crataegus and C. wattiana in C. sect. Sanguineae. It has been placed in nothosection Crataeguineae. It has blackish purple fruit.

== See also ==
- List of hawthorn species with black fruit
