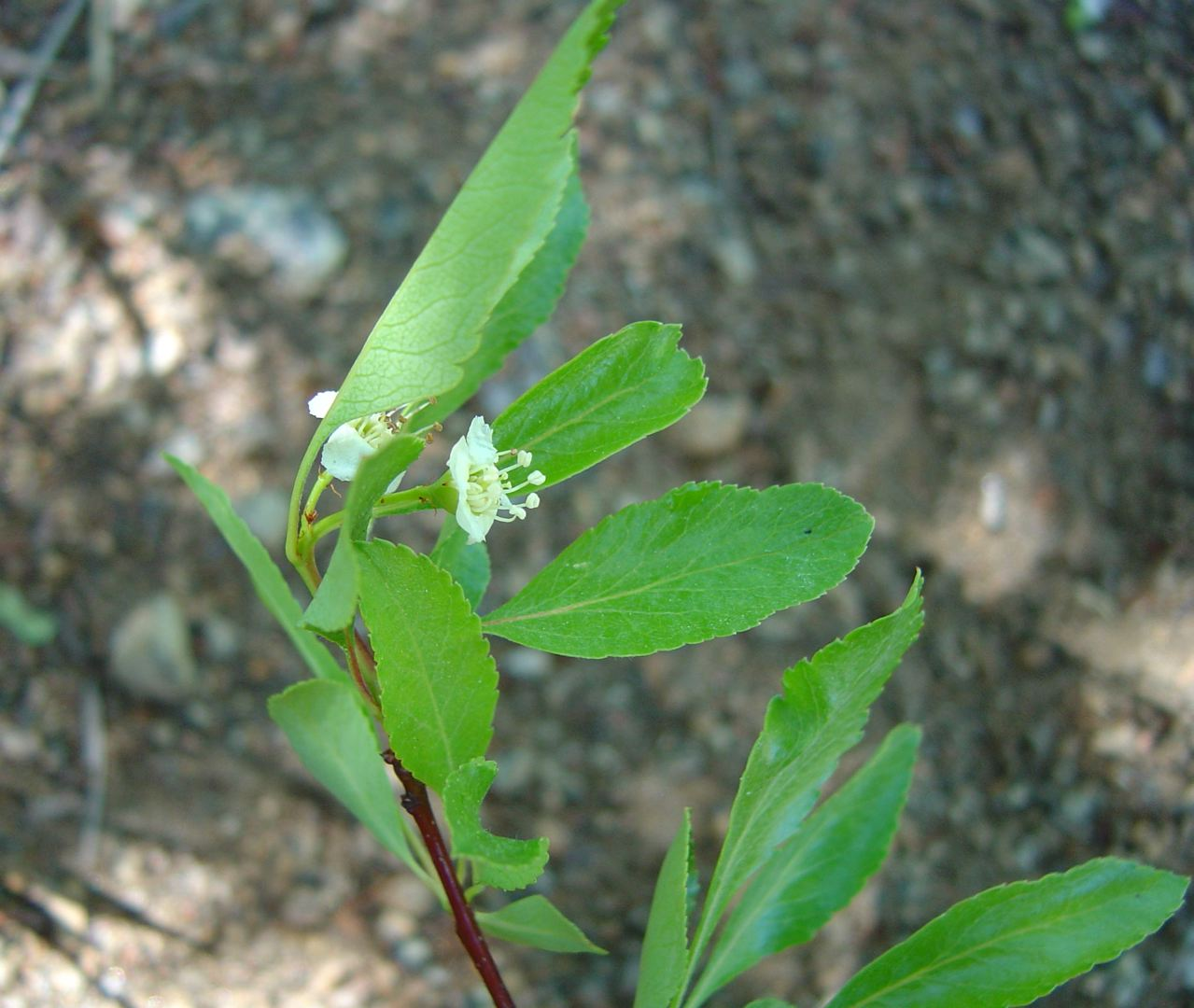

Scientific classification
- Kingdom: Plantae
- Clade: Tracheophytes
- Clade: Angiosperms
- Clade: Eudicots
- Clade: Rosids
- Order: Rosales
- Family: Rosaceae
- Genus: Crataegus
- Section: Crataegus sect. Douglasia
- Series: Crataegus ser. Cerrones
- Species: C. saligna

Binomial name
- Crataegus saligna Greene
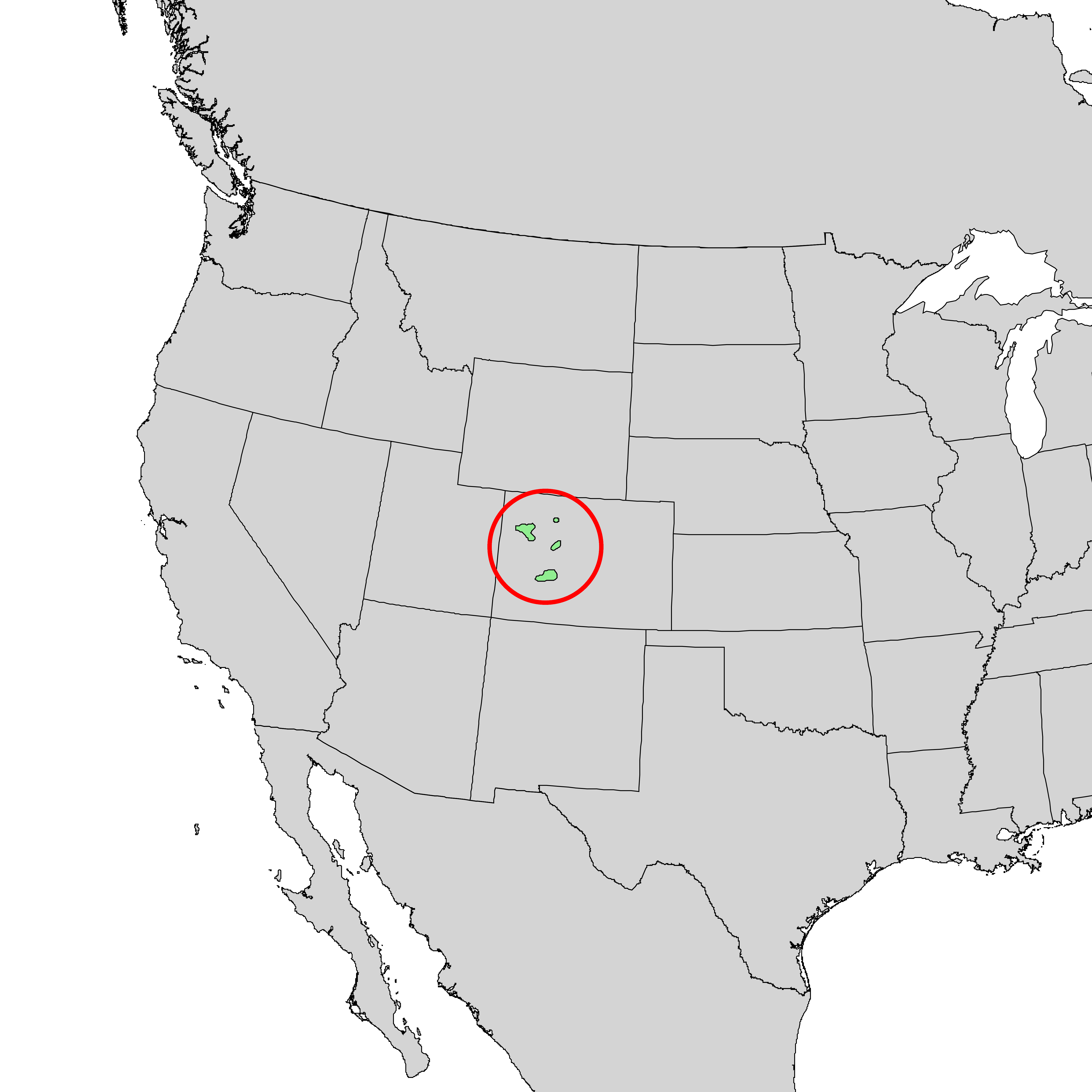
- Natural range of Crataegus saligna

Synonyms
- C. douglasii var. duchesnensis S.L.Welsh; C. wheeleri A.Nelson

= Crataegus saligna =

Species of hawthorn

Crataegus saligna is a species of hawthorn known by the common name willow hawthorn that is rarely cultivated and rather uncommon in the wild. Its native range is wet areas of western Colorado and northeastern Utah. It is a shrub or small tree with thin, elongated leaves, small flowers, small black fruit, and reddish bark.

It is related to C. erythropoda and C. rivularis.

== Images ==
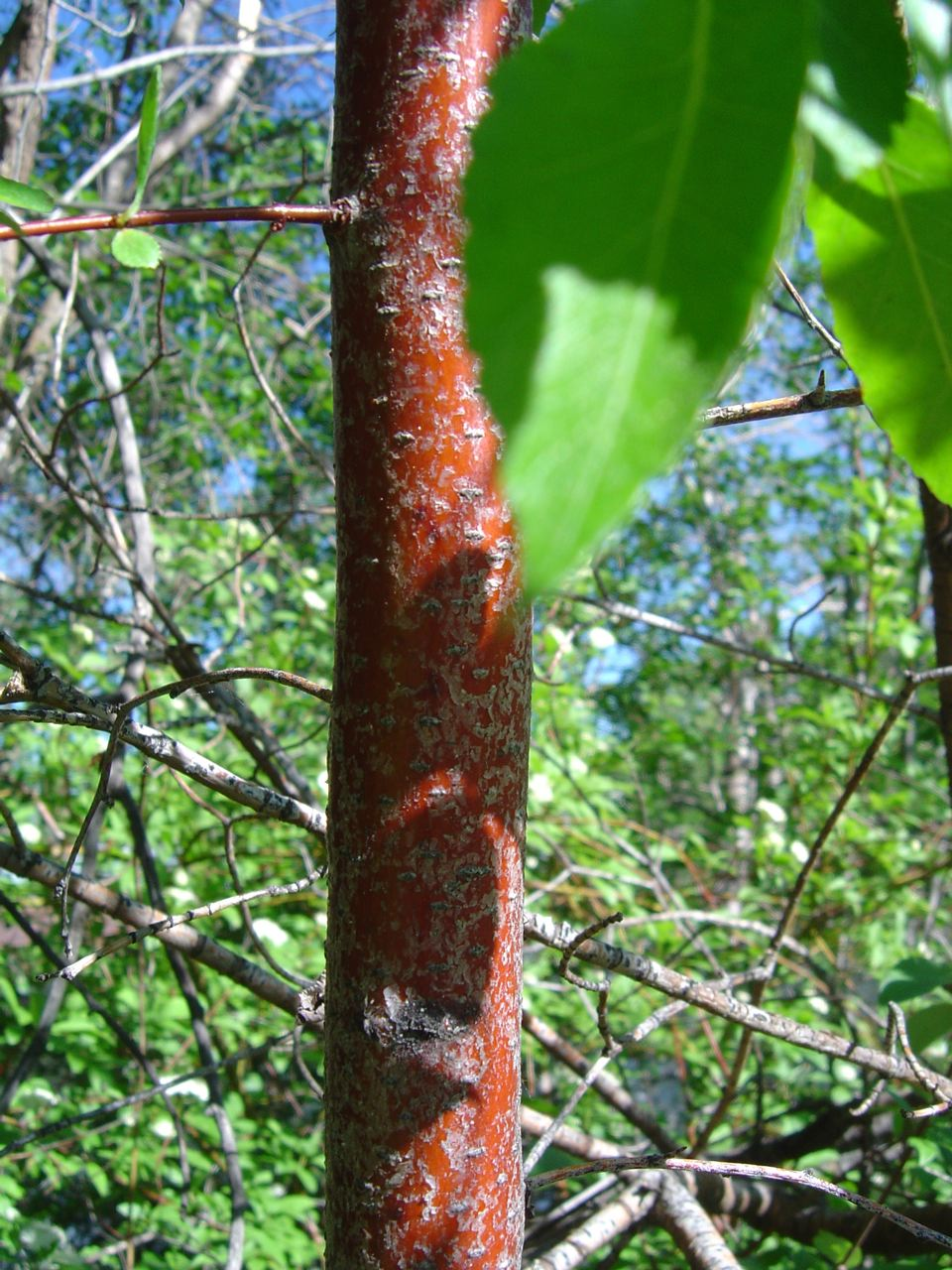

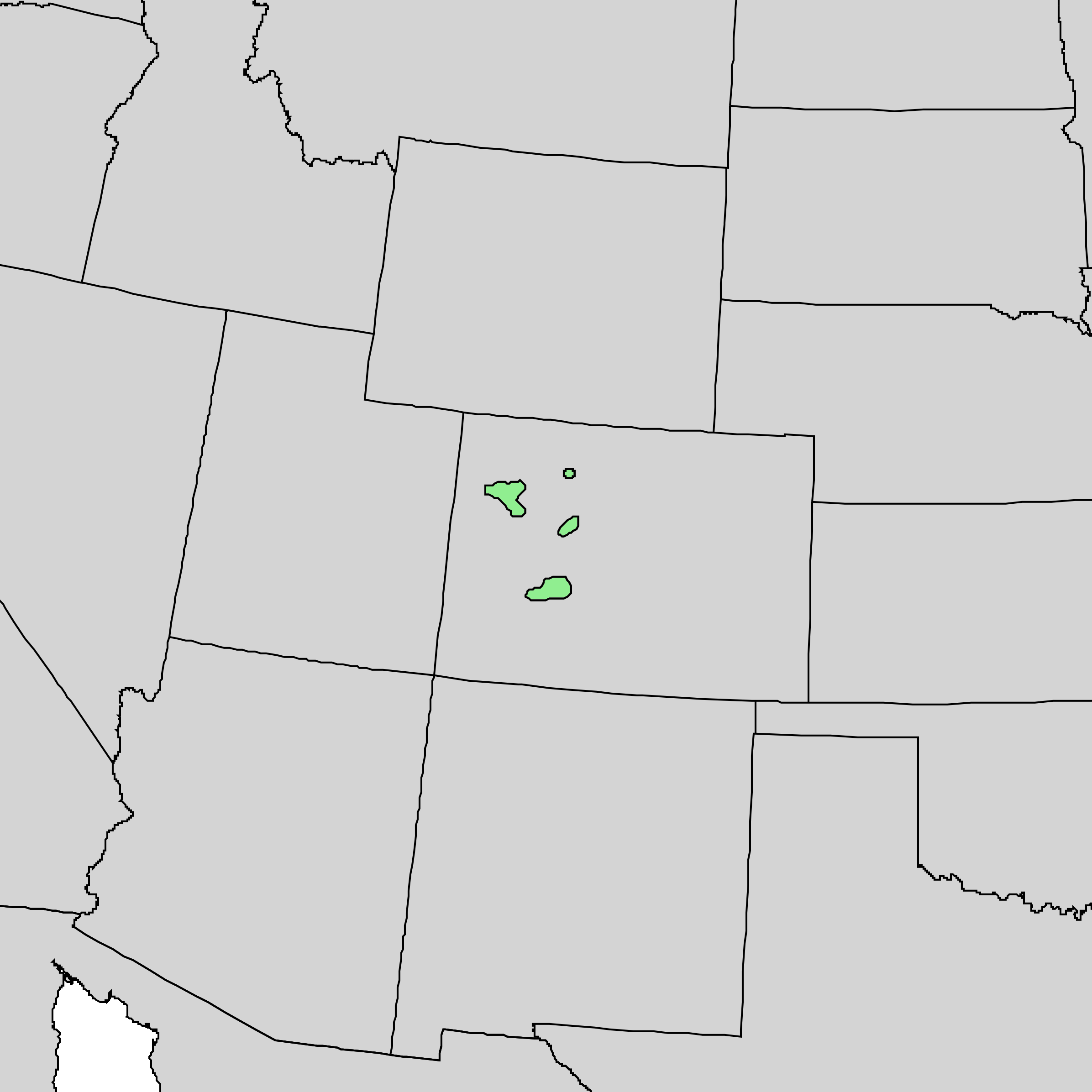
Natural range

== See also ==
- List of hawthorn species with black fruit
