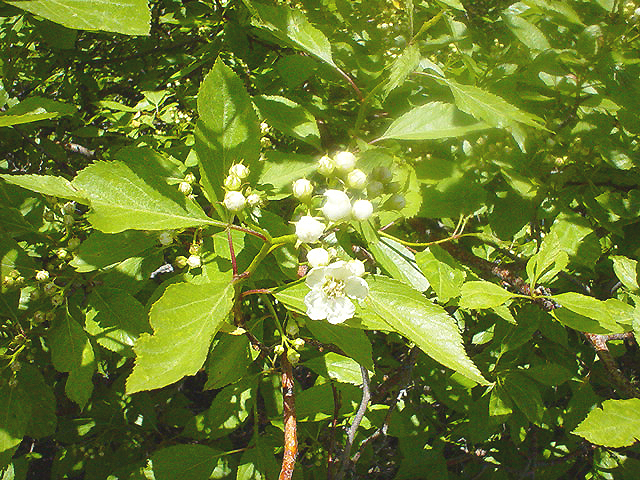

Conservation status
- Least Concern (IUCN 3.1)

Scientific classification
- Kingdom: Plantae
- Clade: Tracheophytes
- Clade: Angiosperms
- Clade: Eudicots
- Clade: Rosids
- Order: Rosales
- Family: Rosaceae
- Genus: Crataegus
- Section: Crataegus sect. Douglasia
- Series: Crataegus ser. Cerrones
- Species: C. rivularis

Binomial name
- Crataegus rivularis Nutt. ex Torr. & A.Gray

= Crataegus rivularis =

North American species of hawthorn

Crataegus rivularis is a species of hawthorn known by the common name river hawthorn. It is native to the intermontane region of the northwestern United States, situated between the coastal ranges and the Rocky Mountains.

C. rivularis is one of the black-fruited hawthorn species. It is closely related to C. erythropoda, and less closely related to C. saligna.

== Images ==
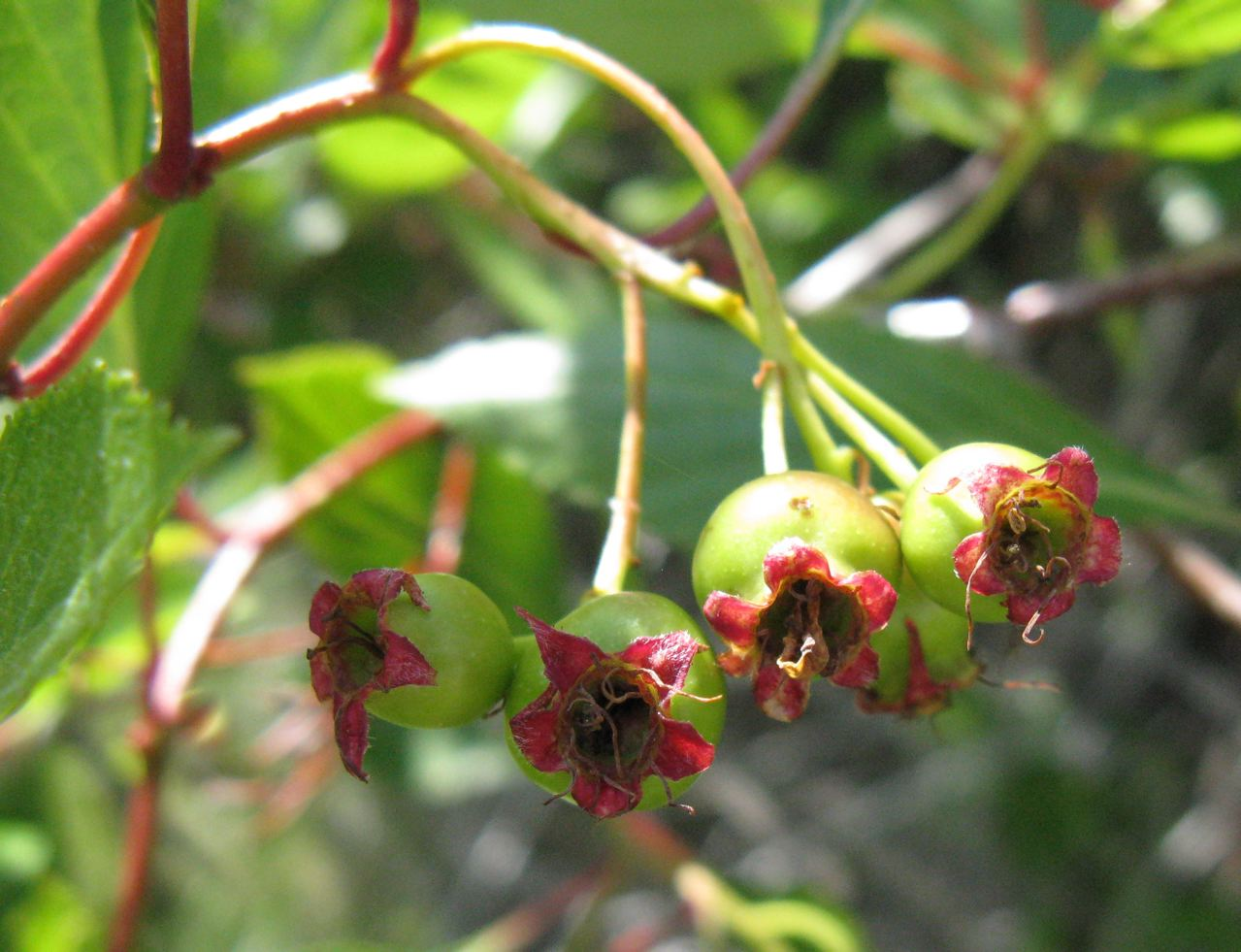
Young fruit

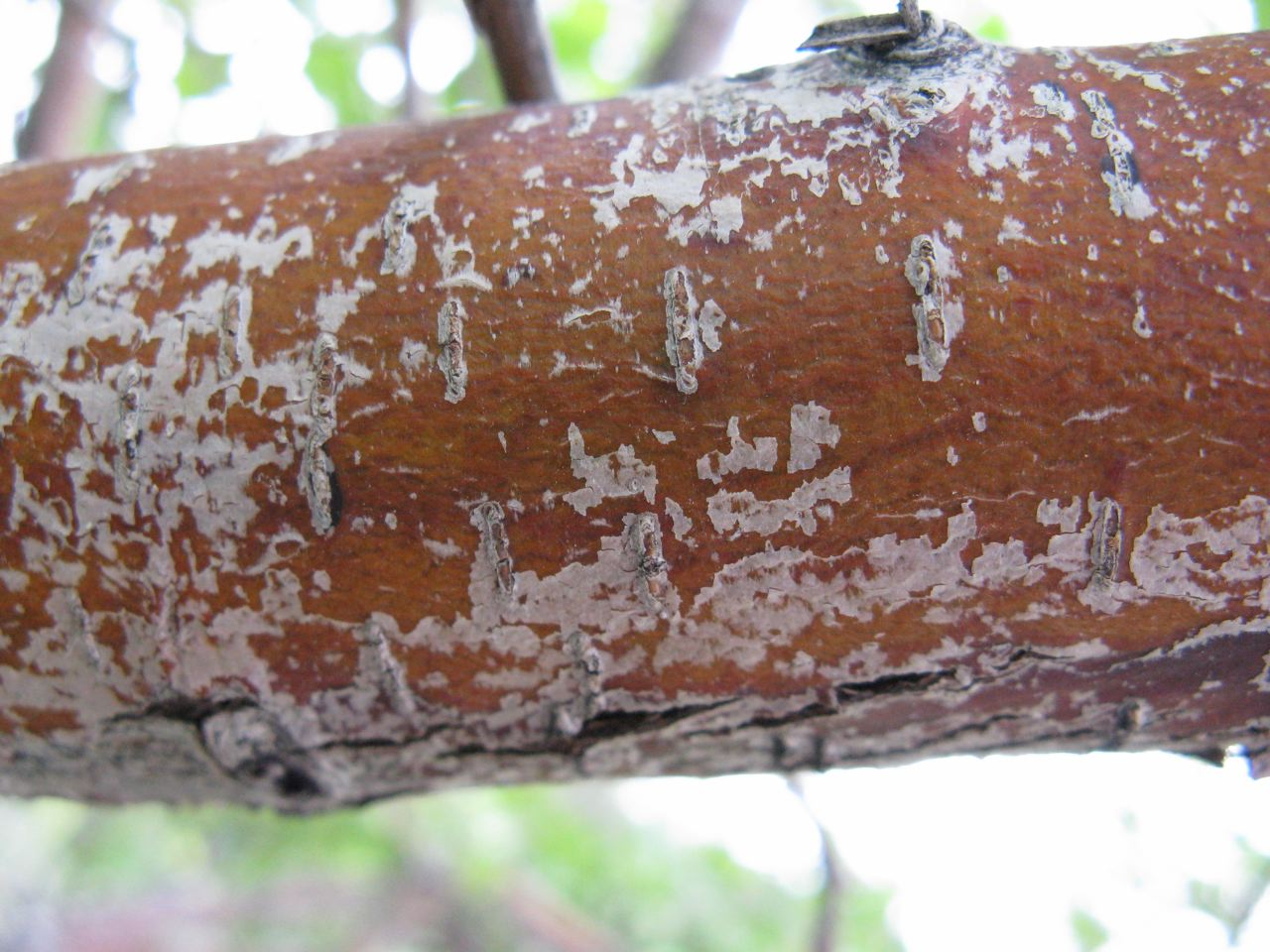
Young bark.

== See also ==
- List of hawthorn species with black fruit
