= Black Hawthorn =

Black Hawthorn may refer to:

- Crataegus nigra
- Crataegus douglasii
- Black, Hawthorn & Co
