= Crataegus brachyacantha =

Conservation status
- Least Concern (IUCN 3.1)

Scientific classification
- Kingdom: Plantae
- Clade: Tracheophytes
- Clade: Angiosperms
- Clade: Eudicots
- Clade: Rosids
- Order: Rosales
- Family: Rosaceae
- Genus: Crataegus
- Species: C. brachyacantha

Binomial name
- Crataegus brachyacantha Sarg. & Engelm.

Species of hawthorn

Crataegus brachyacantha is one of the "black-fruited" species of hawthorn, but it is only very distantly related to the other black-fruited species such as C. douglasii or C. nigra. The common names blueberry haw and blueberry hawthorn refer to the appearance of the fruit, which are almost blue, and does not refer to their taste. The species is rarely cultivated but has ornamental leaves, flowers, and foliage. It is native to Louisiana, and also occurs just across the border of neighbouring states.

== See also ==
- List of hawthorn species with black fruit
