= Stigmella paradoxa =

Scientific classification
- Kingdom: Animalia
- Phylum: Arthropoda
- Class: Insecta
- Order: Lepidoptera
- Family: Nepticulidae
- Genus: Stigmella
- Species: S. paradoxa

Binomial name
- Stigmella paradoxa (Frey, 1858)

Synonyms
- Nepticula paradoxa Frey, 1858; Stigmella juryi Puplesis, 1991; Nepticula nitidella Heinemann, 1862

Species of moth

Stigmella paradoxa is a moth of the family Nepticulidae. It is found in most of Europe (except the Benelux, Iceland, Denmark, Norway, Norway, Finland, and most of the Baltic region), east to the Near East and the eastern part of the Palearctic realm.

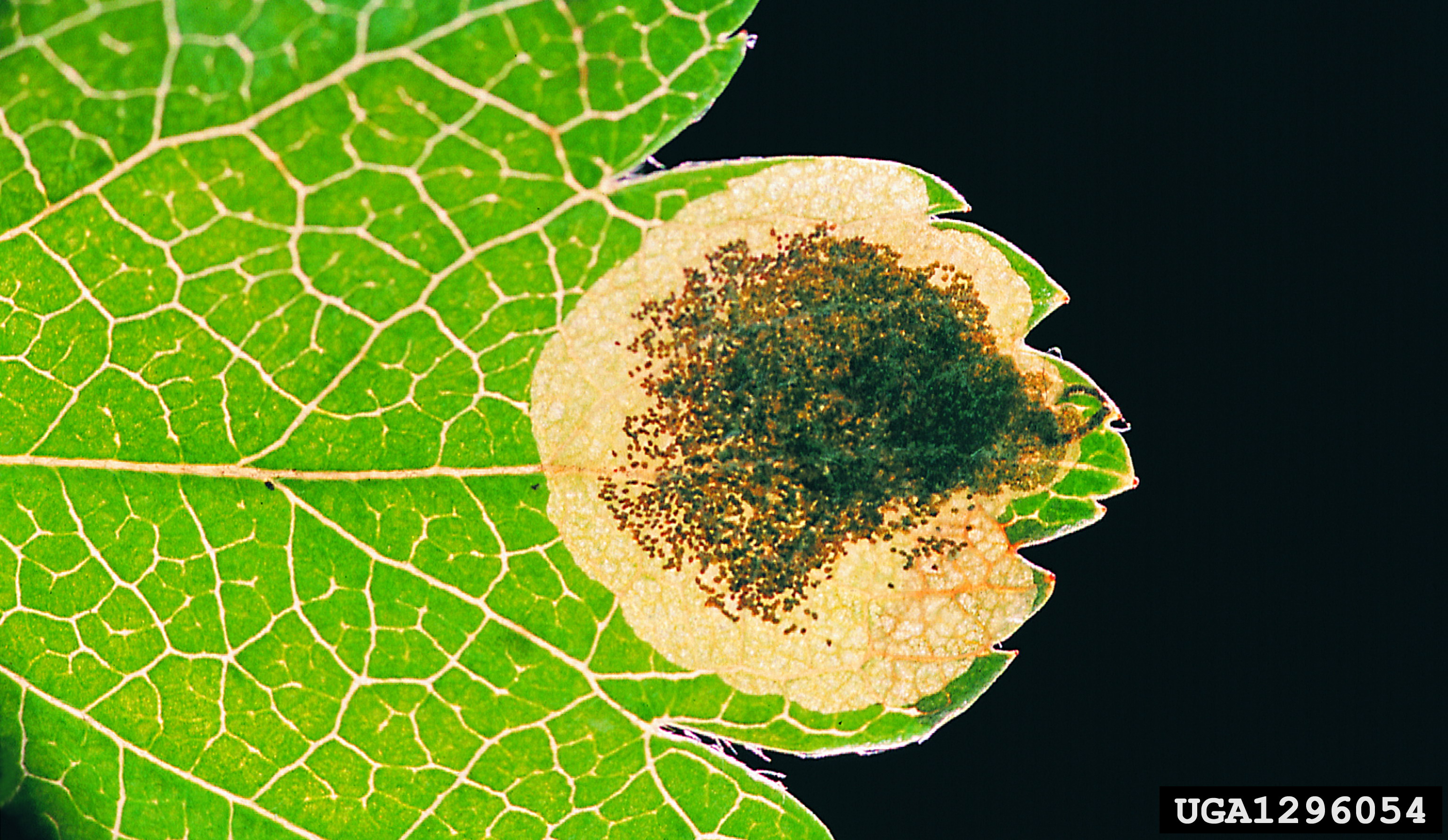
Stigmella paradoxa mine

The wingspan is 4–5 mm. The thick erect hairs on the head vertex are rust yellow and the collar white. The antennal eyecaps are white. The forewings are shiny bronze brown with a tip dark purple brown, apex. The hindwings are brown grey.

Adults are on wing from June to July.

The larvae feed on Crataegus laevigata, Crataegus monogyna and Crataegus pentagyna. They mine the leaves of their host plant. The damage consists of blotch in the tip of a leaf segment, without any preceding corridor.
