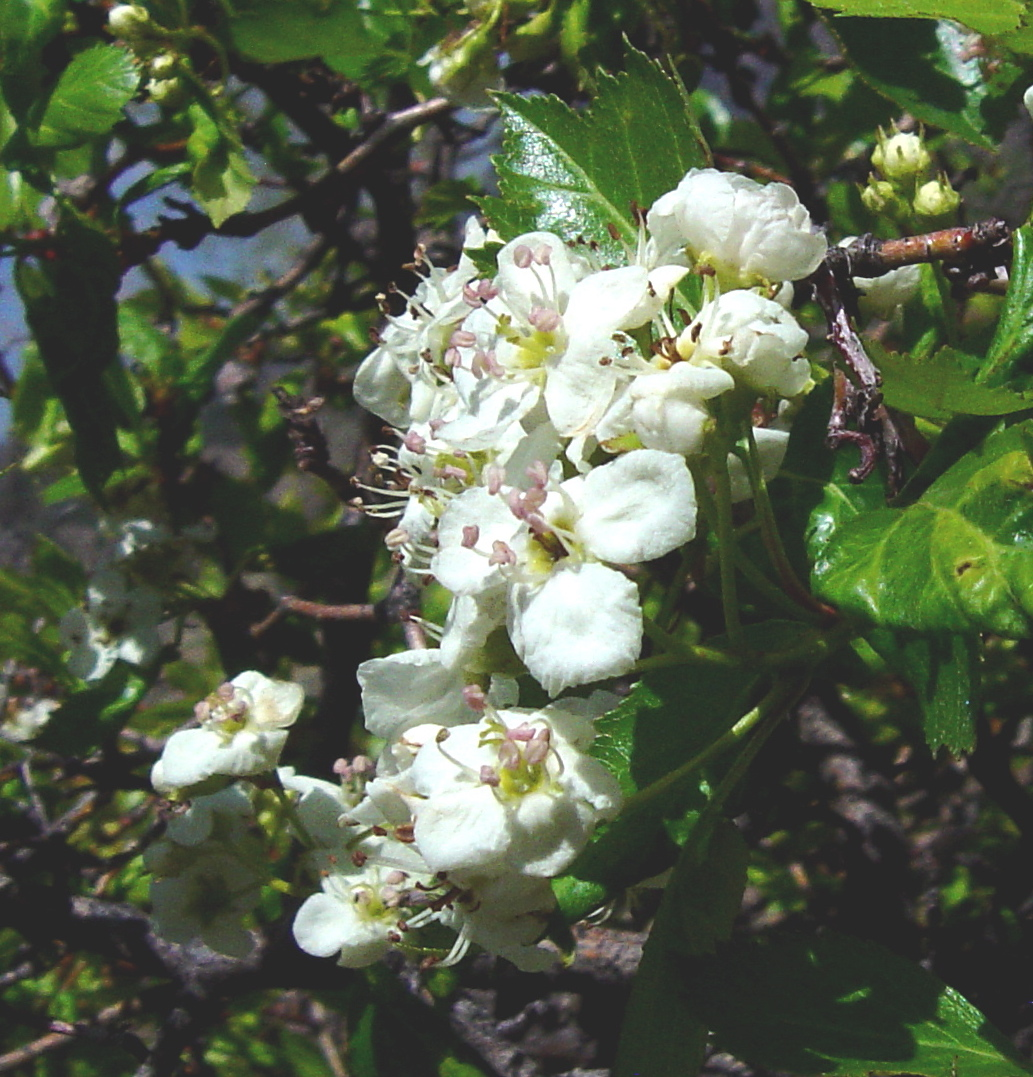

Conservation status
- Least Concern (IUCN 3.1)

Scientific classification
- Kingdom: Plantae
- Clade: Tracheophytes
- Clade: Angiosperms
- Clade: Eudicots
- Clade: Rosids
- Order: Rosales
- Family: Rosaceae
- Genus: Crataegus
- Section: Crataegus sect. Douglasia
- Series: Crataegus ser. Cerrones
- Species: C. erythropoda

Binomial name
- Crataegus erythropoda Ashe
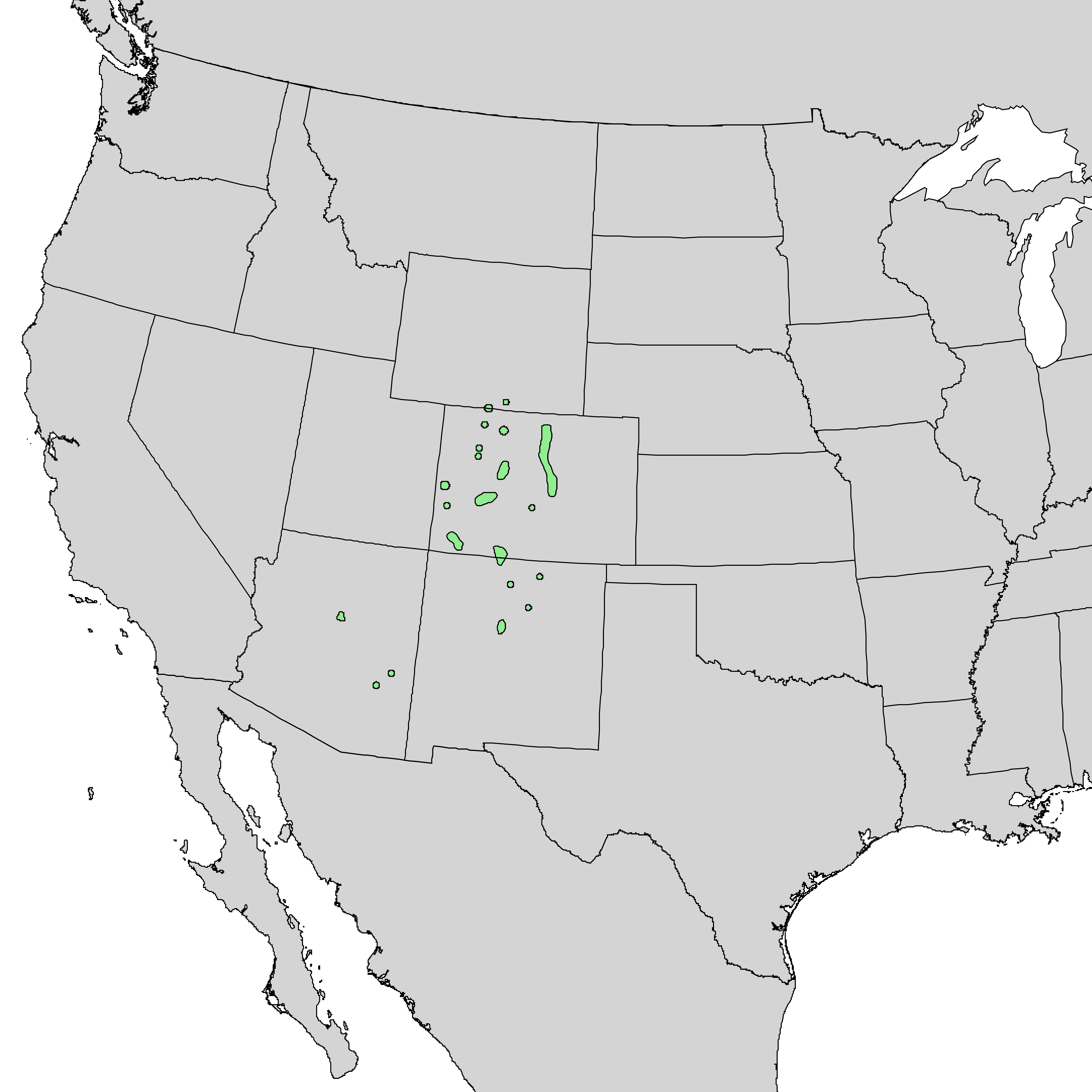
- Natural range of Crataegus erythropoda

Synonyms
- Crataegus cerronis A.Nelson

= Crataegus erythropoda =

Species of hawthorn

Crataegus erythropoda is a hawthorn native to the southern Rocky Mountains in the United States. The leaves are conspicuously shiny above and fruit ("haws") are dark purplish red. It is seldom cultivated, but at one time was listed in the nursery trade under the common name "Chocolate Haw". It is closely related to C. rivularis which has fruit that are fully black when ripe.

== Images ==
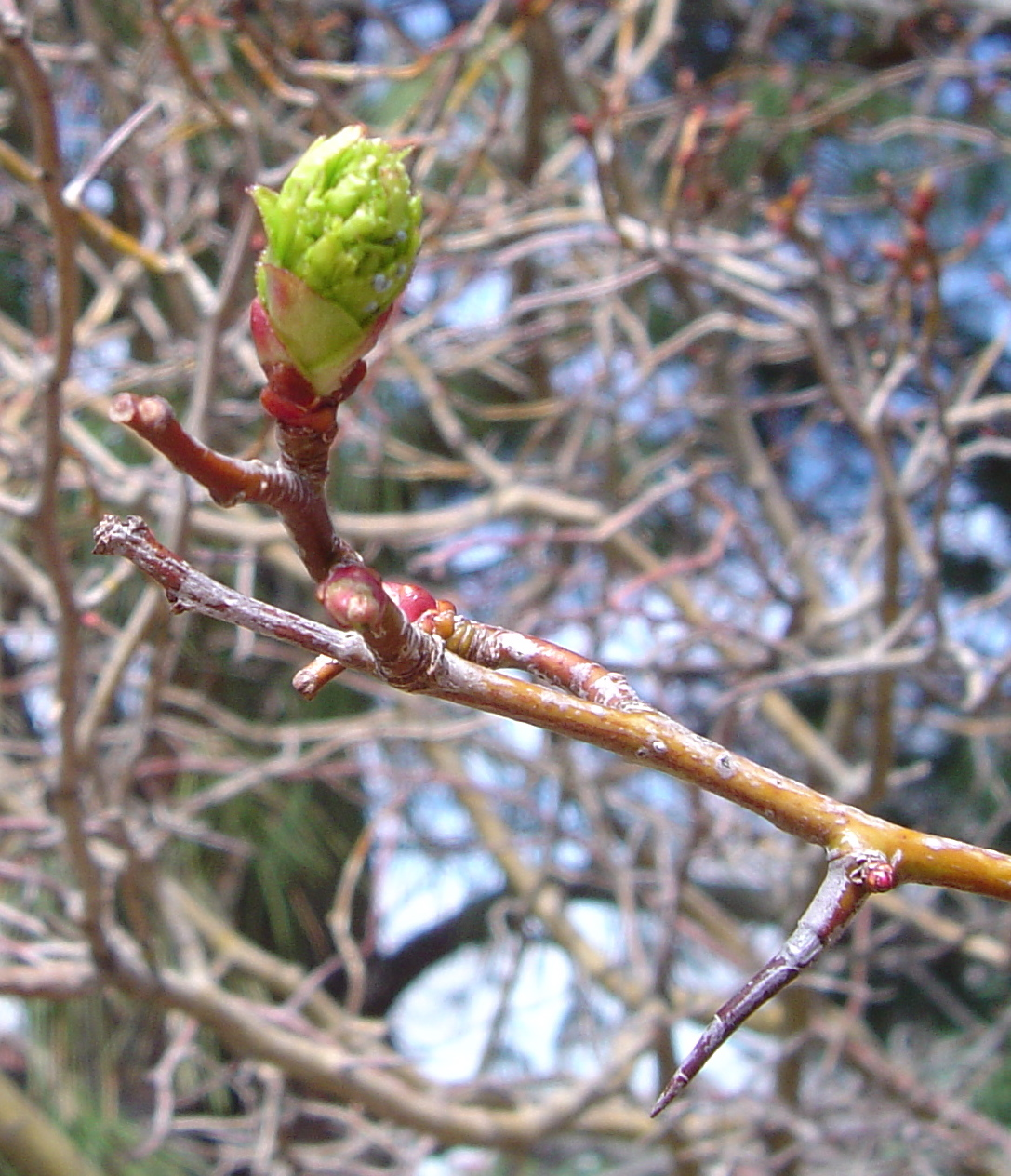
Leaf bud opening in the spring, and thorn

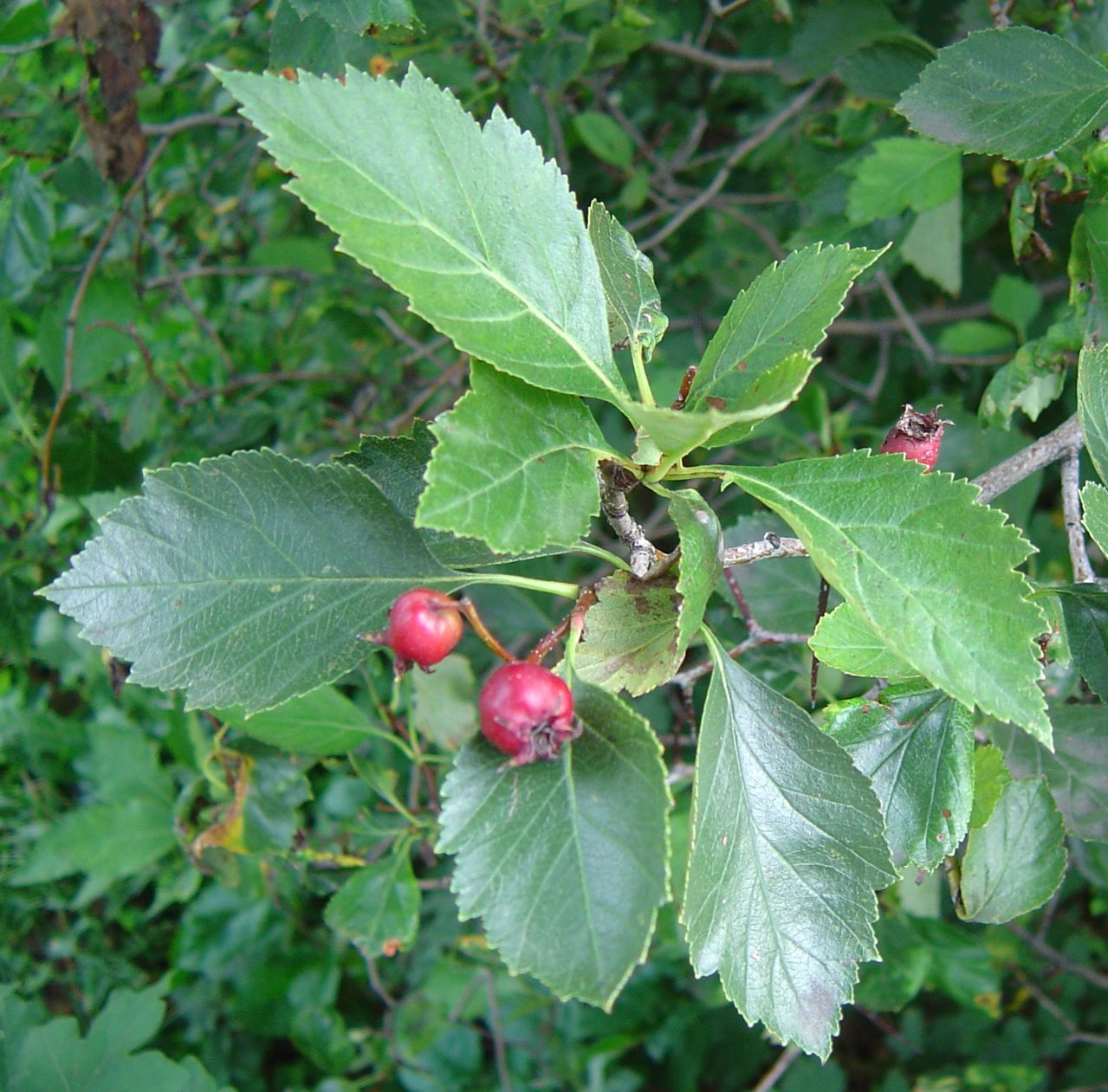
Fruit not yet ripe, a lighter colour than on some other individuals

== See also ==
- List of hawthorn species with black fruit
