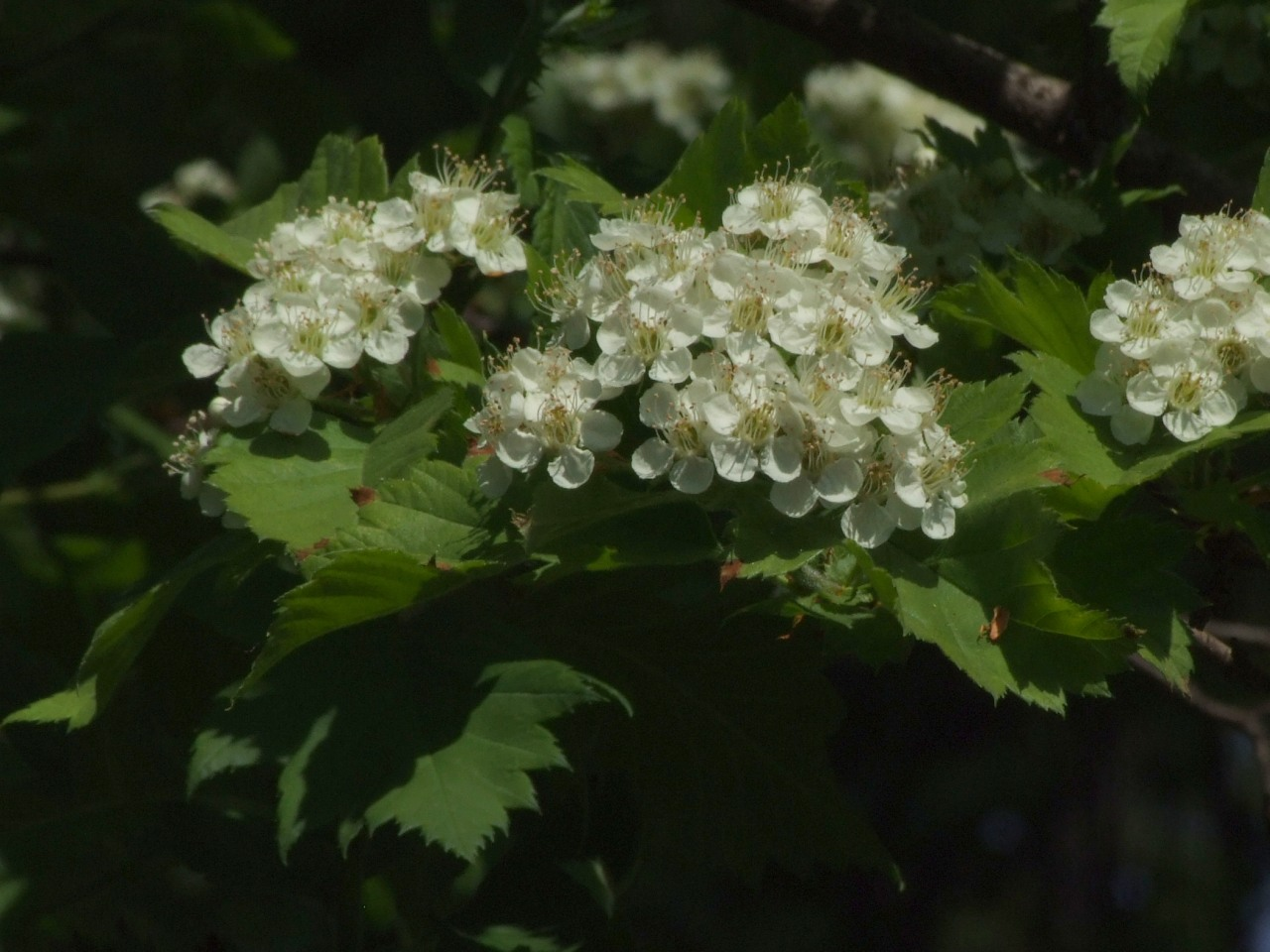

Scientific classification
- Kingdom: Plantae
- Clade: Tracheophytes
- Clade: Angiosperms
- Clade: Eudicots
- Clade: Rosids
- Order: Rosales
- Family: Rosaceae
- Genus: Crataegus
- Section: Crataegus sect. Sanguineae
- Series: Crataegus ser. Nigrae
- Species: C. chlorosarca

Binomial name
- Crataegus chlorosarca Maxim.

= Crataegus chlorosarca =

Species of hawthorn

Crataegus chlorosarca is an Asian species of hawthorn with black fruit. Although recommended as an ornamental and hardy in cold climates, it is rarely cultivated.

== See also ==
- List of hawthorn species with black fruit
