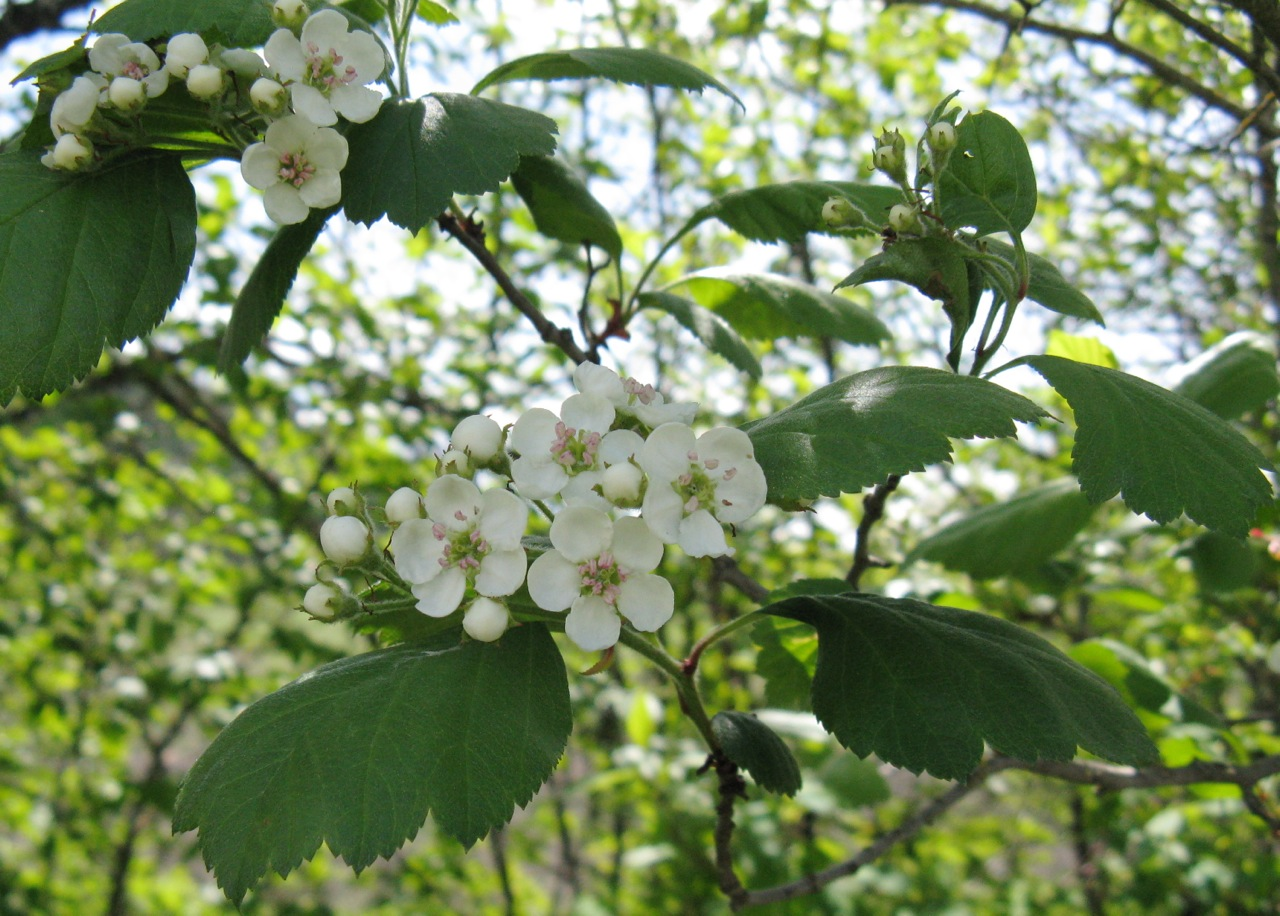

Conservation status
- Data Deficient (IUCN 3.1)

Scientific classification
- Kingdom: Plantae
- Clade: Tracheophytes
- Clade: Angiosperms
- Clade: Eudicots
- Clade: Rosids
- Order: Rosales
- Family: Rosaceae
- Genus: Crataegus
- Species: C. phippsii

Binomial name
- Crataegus phippsii O'Kennon

= Crataegus phippsii =

Species of hawthorn

Crataegus phippsii is a species of hawthorn native to south-central British Columbia, Washington state, and Montana. It forms a shrub or small tree to 7 m in height with leaves that have white hair on the underside, and fruit that ripen through red to purplish black. It appears to have potential as an ornamental plant.

== See also ==
- List of hawthorn species with black fruit
