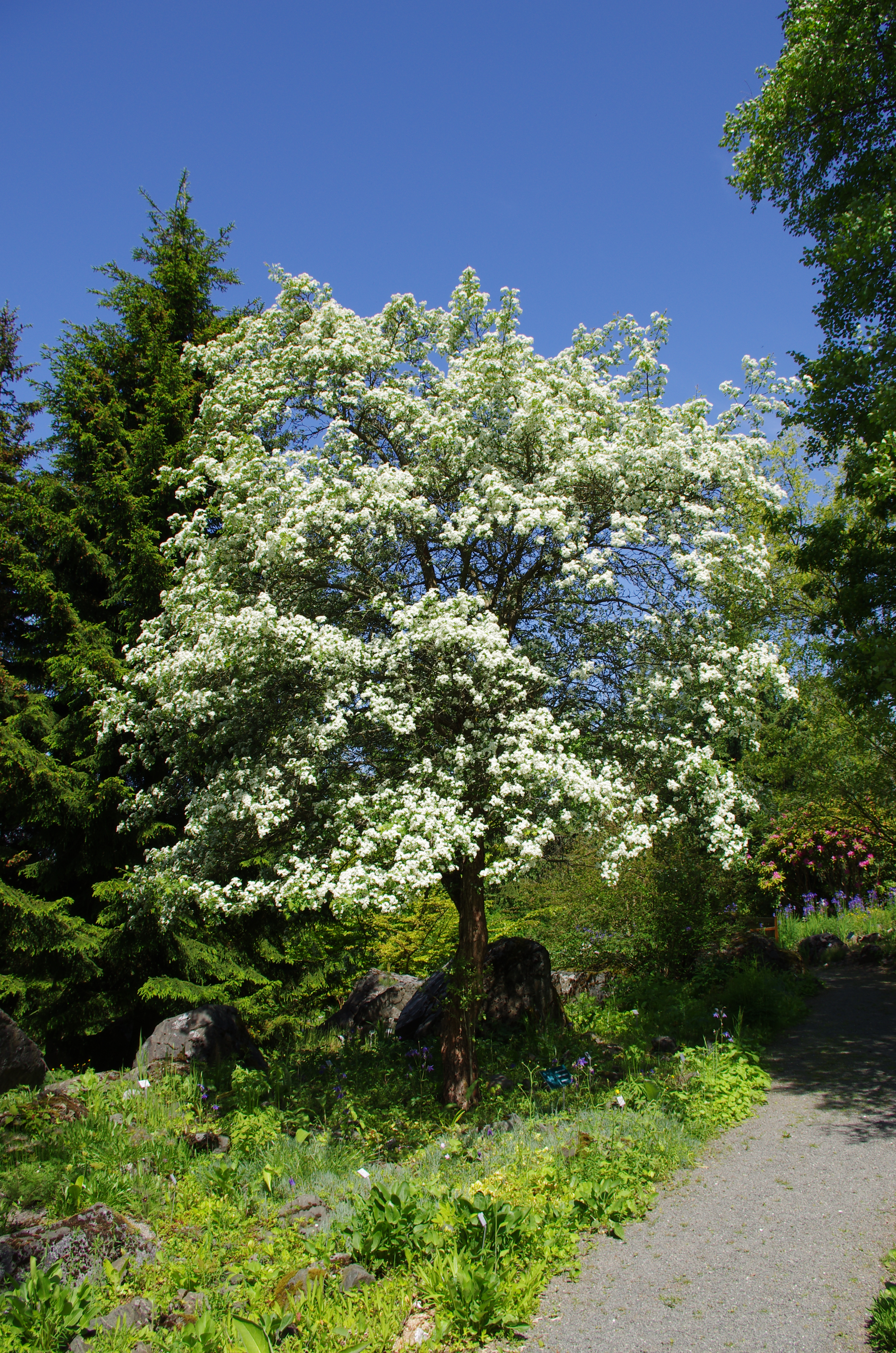

Scientific classification
- Kingdom: Plantae
- Clade: Tracheophytes
- Clade: Angiosperms
- Clade: Eudicots
- Clade: Rosids
- Order: Rosales
- Family: Rosaceae
- Genus: Crataegus
- Section: Crataegus sect. Sanguineae
- Series: Crataegus ser. Sanguineae
- Species: C. maximowiczii

Binomial name
- Crataegus maximowiczii C.K.Schneid.

Synonyms
- C. altaica var. villosa (Rupr.) Lange; C. beipiaogensis S.L.Tung & X.J.Tian; C. maximowiczii var. ninganensis S.Q.Nie & B.J.Jen; C. sanguinea var. villosa Rupr.

= Crataegus maximowiczii =

Species of hawthorn

Crataegus maximowiczii is a species of hawthorn with fruit that are red to purple-black.

== See also ==
- List of hawthorn species with black fruit
