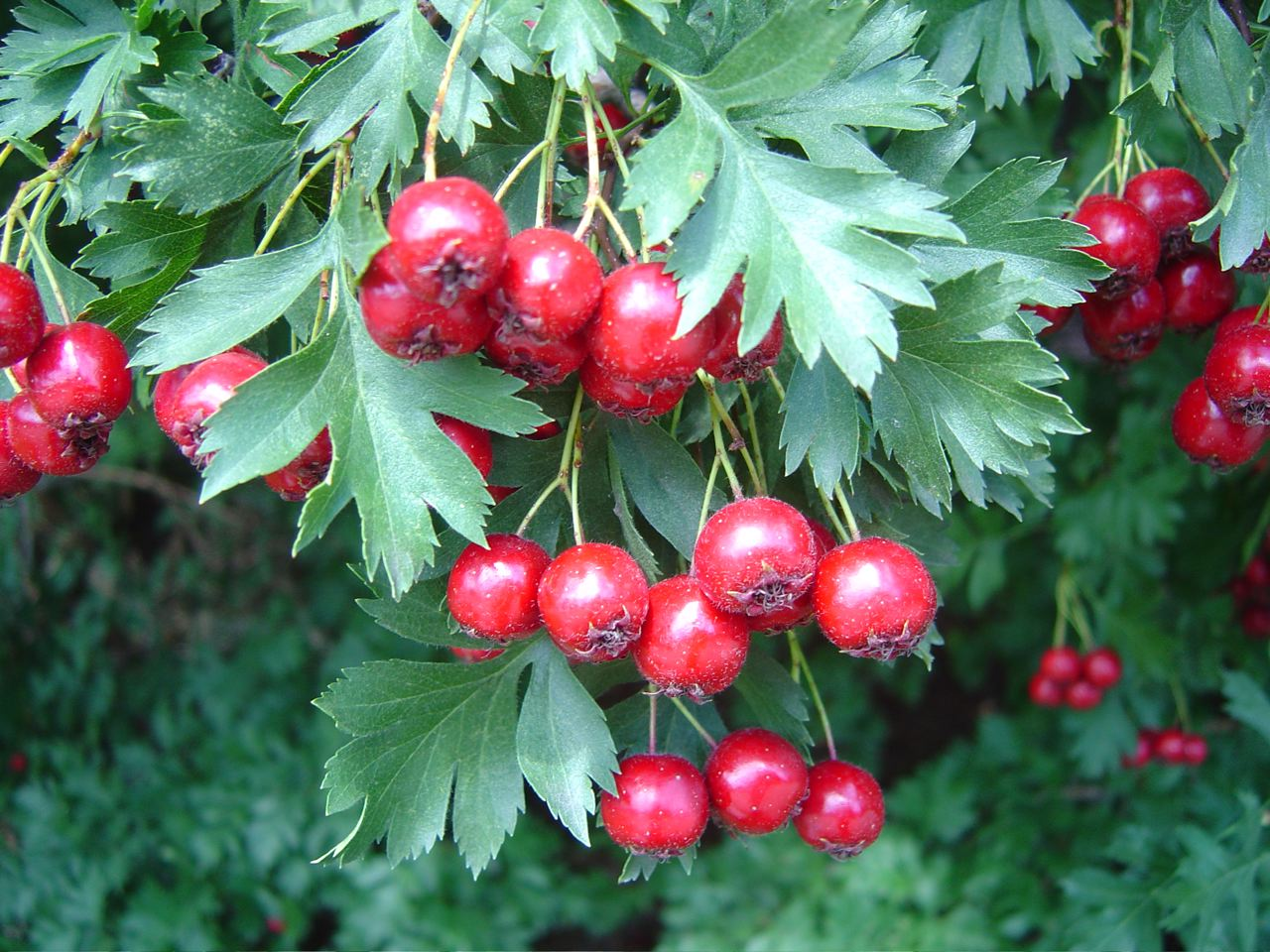

Conservation status
- Data Deficient (IUCN 3.1)

Scientific classification
- Kingdom: Plantae
- Clade: Tracheophytes
- Clade: Angiosperms
- Clade: Eudicots
- Clade: Rosids
- Order: Rosales
- Family: Rosaceae
- Genus: Crataegus
- Section: Crataegus sect. Crataegus
- Series: Crataegus ser. Crataegus
- Species: C. ambigua

Binomial name
- Crataegus ambigua A.K.Becker

= Crataegus ambigua =

Species of hawthorn

Crataegus ambigua is a species of thorn (hawthorn) native to Western Asia and Eastern Europe, including Armenia, Iran, Russia, and Turkey. It grows as a shrub or tree up to about 12 m in height. The fruit is dark red to purple or black, with one or two stones (pyrenes).

Crataegus ambigua is closely related to Crataegus songarica, a species that has black fruit.
