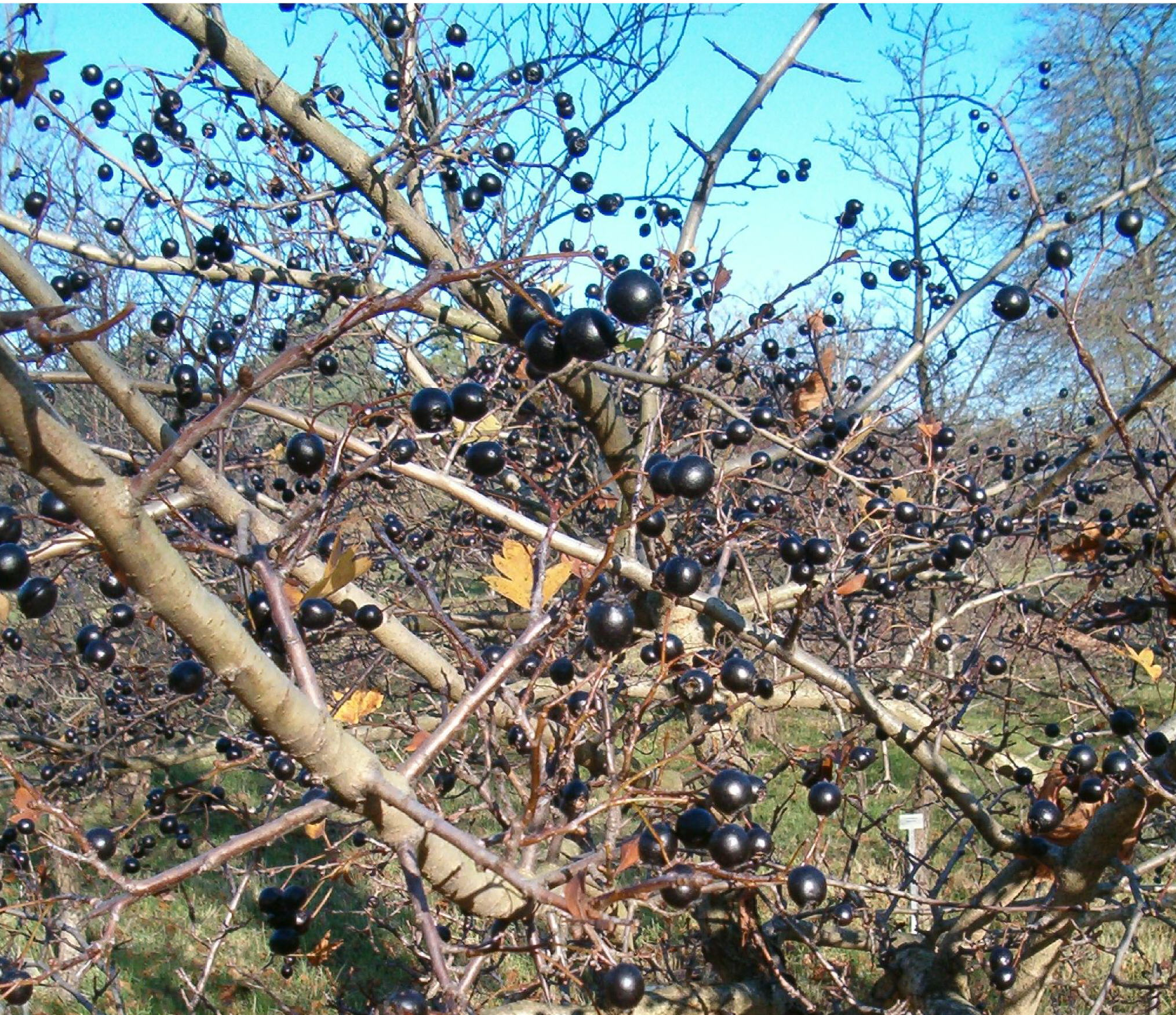

Conservation status
- Least Concern (IUCN 3.1)

Scientific classification
- Kingdom: Plantae
- Clade: Tracheophytes
- Clade: Angiosperms
- Clade: Eudicots
- Clade: Rosids
- Order: Rosales
- Family: Rosaceae
- Genus: Crataegus
- Species: C. pentagyna

Binomial name
- Crataegus pentagyna Waldst. & Kit. ex Willd.

Synonyms
- C. colchica Grossh. C. davisii Browicz; C. elbursensis Rech.f. C. klokovii Ivaschin; C. melanocarpa M.Bieb. C. oliveriana Bosc ex DC. C. platyphylla Lindl. ex Hohen. C. pseudomelanocarpa Pojark.

= Crataegus pentagyna =

Species of hawthorn

Crataegus pentagyna, also called small-flowered black hawthorn, is a species of hawthorn native to southeastern Europe. Two subspecies are recognized, C. p. subsp. pentagyna and C. p. subsp. pseudomelanocarpa. The fruit are usually black, but are sometimes a handsome purple.

== See also ==
- List of hawthorn species with black fruit

== Images ==
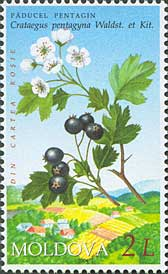
Stamp of Moldova showing Crataegus pentagyna.

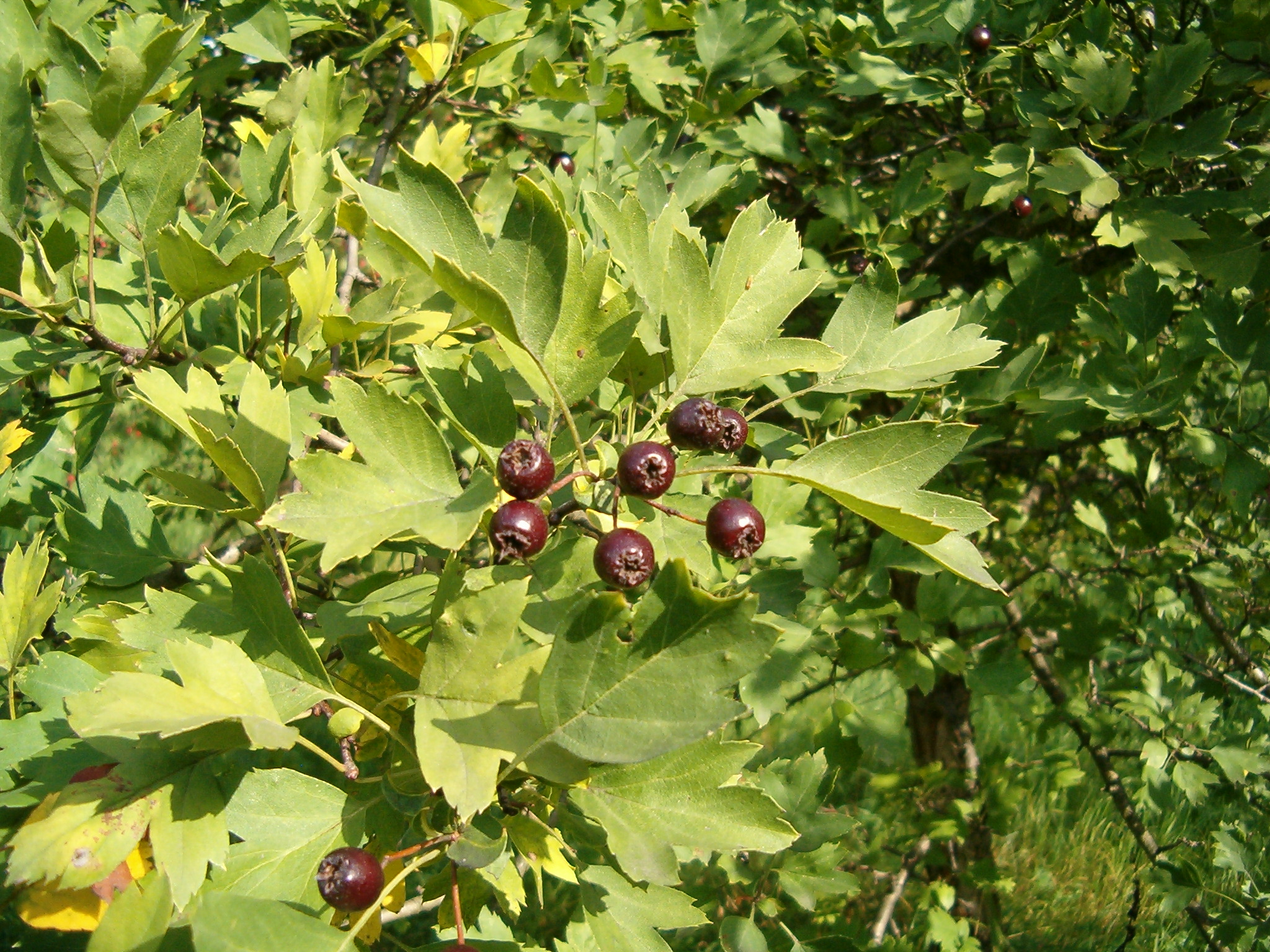
