= List of hawthorn species with black fruit =

Most species of Crataegus (hawthorn) have red fruit, some have yellow fruit, and a number of species can have black or purple fruit.

== Eurasian species ==
- C. ambigua
- C. caucasica
- C. chlorosarca, Asian
- C. clarkei, Asian
- C. dzairensis
- C. ×dsungarica
- C. heterophylloides
- C. jozana
- C. karadaghensis
- C. longipes
- C. maximowiczii has fruit that are red to purple-black
- C. nigra, European
- C. pallasii
- C. pentagyna, European
- C. ×pseudazarolus has fruit that vary from orange to blackish
- C. sakranensis
- C. ×rubrinervis
- C. songarica, Asian
- C. ×zangezura

== North American species ==
- C. ambigens, series Silvicolae, eastern, fruit "greenish-yellow becoming dark purplish-red"
- C. angulata, series Pruinosae, eastern, fruit "light yellowish green becoming dark purplish-red"
- C. aquacervensis, western, fruit are deep red to purple
- C. atrovirens, western
- C. brachyacantha, native to the southern U.S.
- C. castlegarensis, western
- C. cupressocollina, western
- C. douglasii, Northern and Western
- C. enderbyensis, western
- C. erythropoda, western
- C. okanaganensis, western
- C. okennonii, western
- C. orbicularis, western
- C. phippsii, western
- C. purpurella, western
- C. radina, series Silvicolae, eastern, fruit "yellow-green to dark purplish-red"
- C. rivularis, western
- C. rivuloadamensis, western
- C. saligna, western
- C. shuswapensis, western
- C. suksdorfii, western

The Kutenai called black hawthorn berries kasha (Ktunaxa: kaǂa).

== See also ==
- List of hawthorn species with yellow fruit

== Sources ==
- Christensen, K.I. 1992. Revision of Crataegus sect. Crataegus and nothosect. Crataeguineae (Rosaceae-Maloideae) in the Old World. Systematic Botany Monographs 35: 1–199.
- Phipps, J.B., O'Kennon, R.J., and Lance, R.W. 2003. Hawthorns and medlars. Royal Horticultural Society, Cambridge, U.K.
- Phipps, J.B.; O'Kennon, R.J. (1998). Three new species of Crataegus (Rosaceae) from Western North America: C. okennonii, C. okanaganensis, and C. phippsii. Sida Contributions to Botany. 18(1): 169–191.
- Phipps, J.B.; O'Kennon, R.J. (2002). New Taxa of Crataegus (Rosaceae) from the Northern Okanagan-Southwestern Shuswap diversity center. Sida Contributions to Botany. 20(1): 115–144.
- Phipps, J.B.; O'Kennon, R.J. (2007). Hawthorns (Crataegus: Rosaceae) of the Cypress Hills, Alberta and Saskatchewan. Journal of the Botanical Research Institute of Texas. 1(2): 1031–1090.
