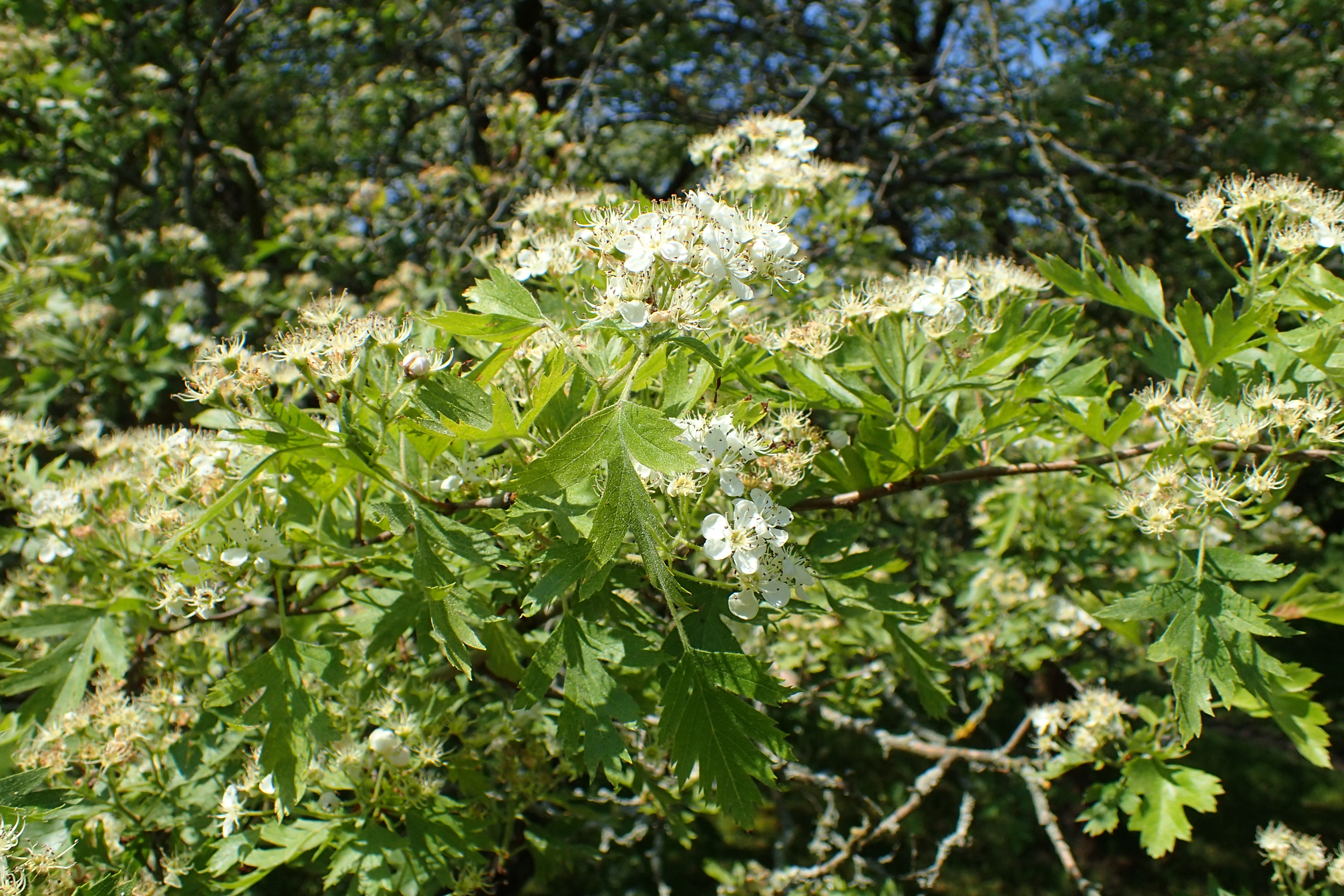

Conservation status
- Least Concern (IUCN 3.1)

Scientific classification
- Kingdom: Plantae
- Clade: Tracheophytes
- Clade: Angiosperms
- Clade: Eudicots
- Clade: Rosids
- Order: Rosales
- Family: Rosaceae
- Genus: Crataegus
- Section: Crataegus sect. Crataegus
- Series: Crataegus ser. Crataegus
- Species: C. songarica

Binomial name
- Crataegus songarica K.Koch

Synonyms
- Crataegus laciniata Kar. & Kir.; Crataegus darvasica Pojark.; Crataegus fischeri C.K.Schneid.; Crataegus gharanica Paulsen ex Pojark.; Crataegus oxyacantha var. incisa Regel; Crataegus pinnatifida var. garanica Paulsen

= Crataegus songarica =

Species of hawthorn

Crataegus songarica is a species of flowering plant in the family Rosaceae. It is an Asian hawthorn with black fruit that is sometimes used medicinally. It is closely related to Crataegus ambigua, a species that has red fruit.

== Distribution and ecology ==
The native range of the species covers much of Central Asia and Xinjiang. It grows on limestone or granite, at elevations of 800–2700 m.

== Description ==
The plant is a tree or small shrub with thorns up to 15 mm in length. The white flowers have 18-20 stamens with purple anthers, and occur in groups of 10–20. The fruit is 6–14 mm in diameter, slightly longer than wide, purplish-black with 1–3 stones (usually 2).

== See also ==
- List of hawthorn species with black fruit
