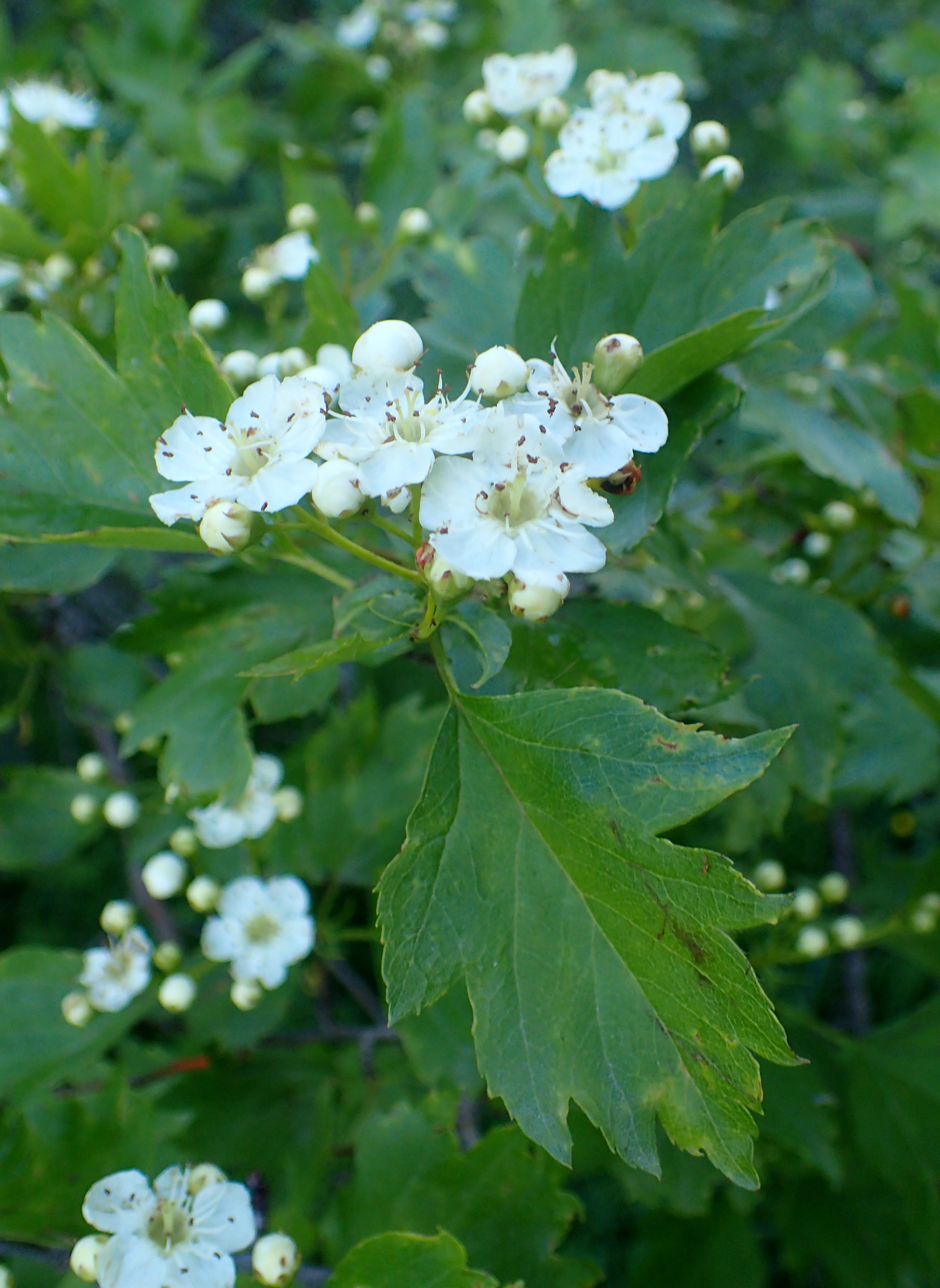

Conservation status
- Endangered (IUCN 3.1)

Scientific classification
- Kingdom: Plantae
- Clade: Tracheophytes
- Clade: Angiosperms
- Clade: Eudicots
- Clade: Rosids
- Order: Rosales
- Family: Rosaceae
- Genus: Crataegus
- Section: Crataegus sect. Sanguineae
- Series: Crataegus ser. Nigrae
- Species: C. nigra

Binomial name
- Crataegus nigra Waldst.& Kit.

= Crataegus nigra =

Species of hawthorn

Crataegus nigra, the Hungarian thorn, Hungarian hawthorn or black hawthorn, is a black-fruited species of hawthorn native to the western balkan and the Pannonian Basin, spanning from Slovakia to Albania. The fruit, which is up to 10 mm across, can be consumed fresh or cooked.. This tree also grows in the forests of northern Iran in the provinces of Gilan, Mazandaran, and Golestan. This plant is the main food of pheasants in these regions. In Mazandaran, it is called Valik in the local language and in Gilan, it is called Marikh in the local language.

The tree grows up to 6 metres in height. Unlike most other species of hawthorn, it grows well in areas that are periodically flooded.

== See also ==
- List of hawthorn species with black fruit
