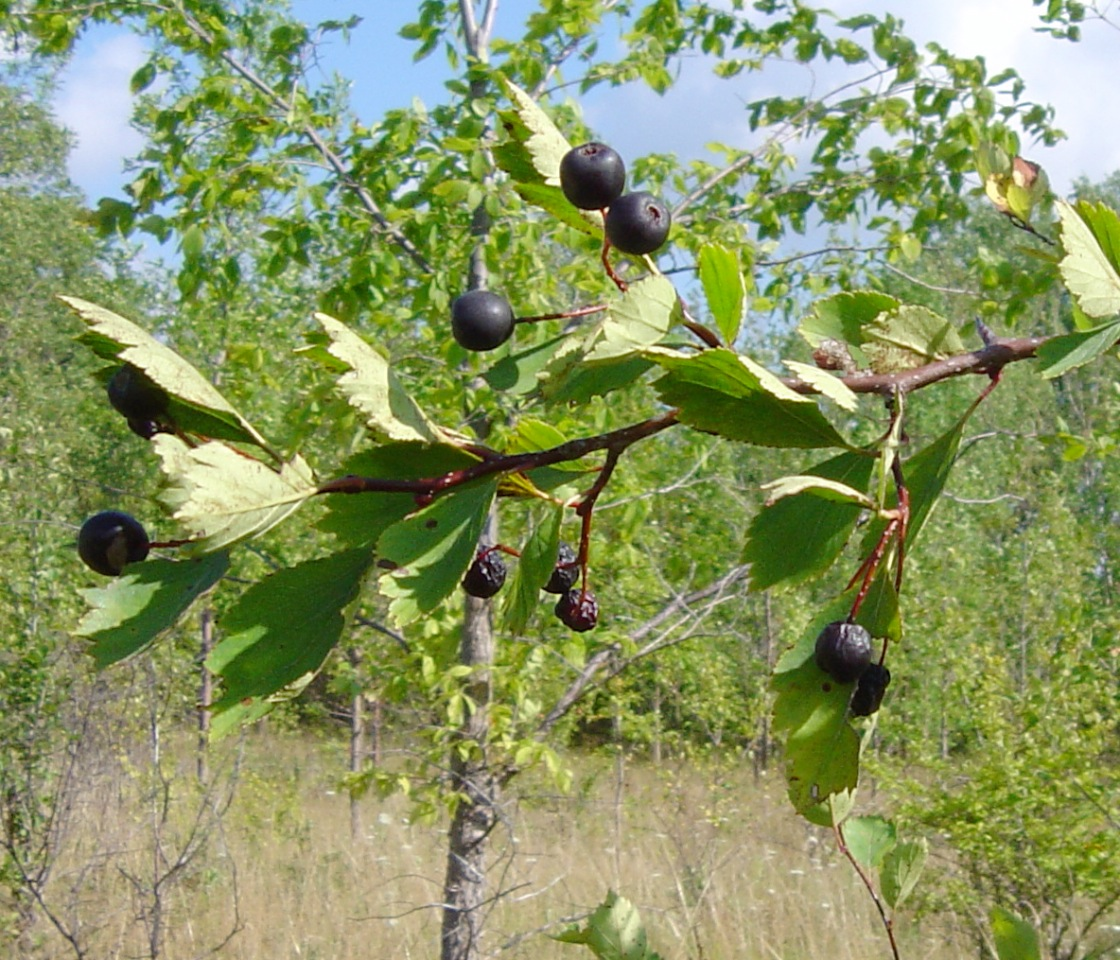
- Crataegus douglasii fruit (series Douglasianae)

Scientific classification
- Kingdom: Plantae
- Clade: Tracheophytes
- Clade: Angiosperms
- Clade: Eudicots
- Clade: Rosids
- Order: Rosales
- Family: Rosaceae
- Genus: Crataegus
- Section: Crataegus sect. Douglasia; Loudon

= Crataegus sect. Douglasia =

Species of hawthorn

Section Douglasia is a North American section within the genus Crataegus of species with black fruit.

== Series ==
Series in section Douglasia include:

- Cerrones
- Douglasianae
- Purpureofructus

== See also ==
- List of hawthorn species with black fruit
