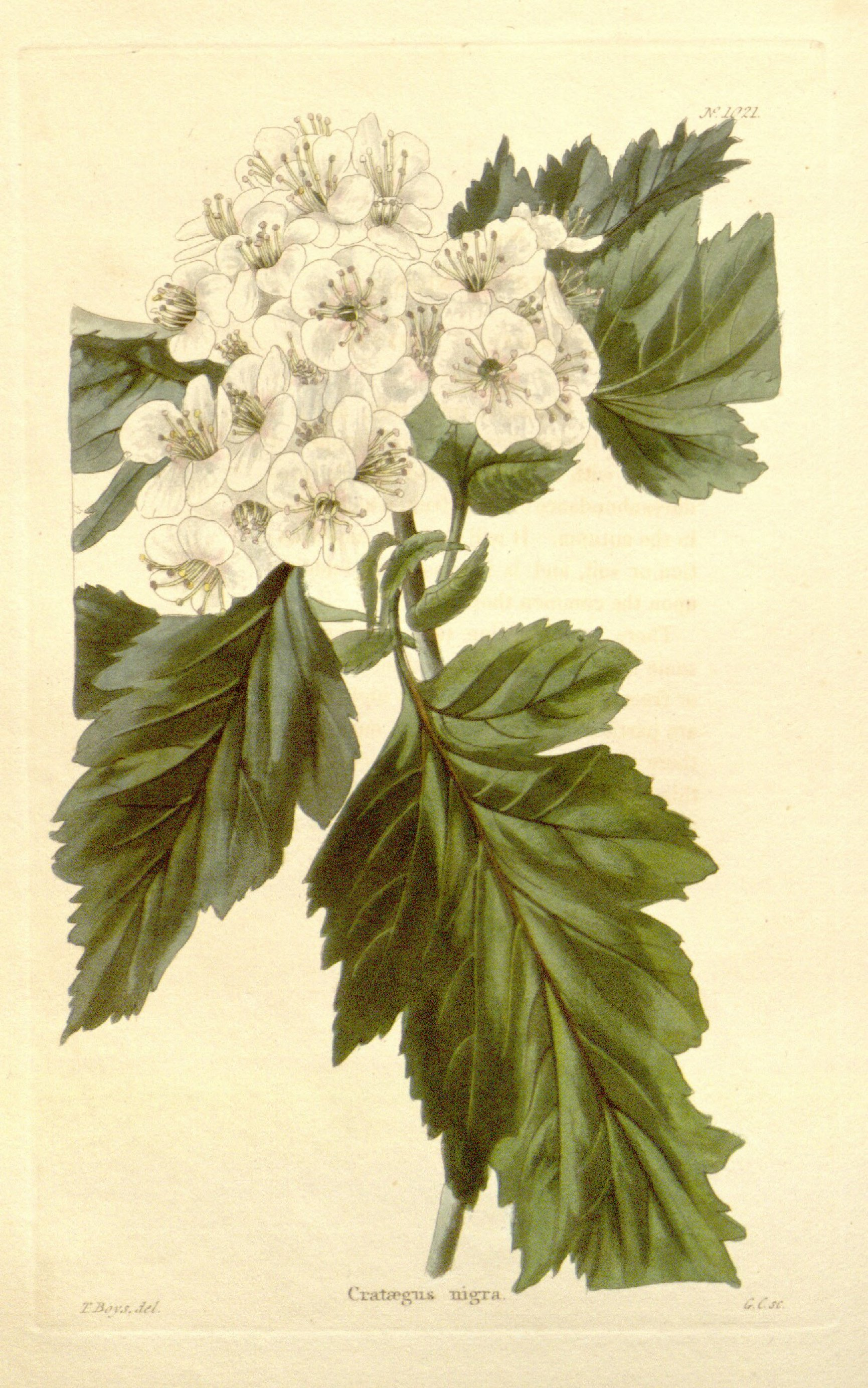
- Crataegus nigra (series Nigrae)

Scientific classification
- Kingdom: Plantae
- Clade: Tracheophytes
- Clade: Angiosperms
- Clade: Eudicots
- Clade: Rosids
- Order: Rosales
- Family: Rosaceae
- Genus: Crataegus
- Section: Crataegus sect. Sanguineae (Zabel ex Rehder) C.K.Schneid.

= Crataegus sect. Sanguineae =

Species of hawthorn

Section Sanguineae is a section within the genus Crataegus native to central and eastern Europe and parts of Asia. It includes about 20 species and three series.

== Series ==
Series in section Sanguineae include:

- Altaicae
- Nigrae
- Sanguineae

== See also ==
- List of hawthorn species with black fruit
- List of hawthorn species with yellow fruit
