= Le Plantier de Costebelle =

Neo-Palladian house in France

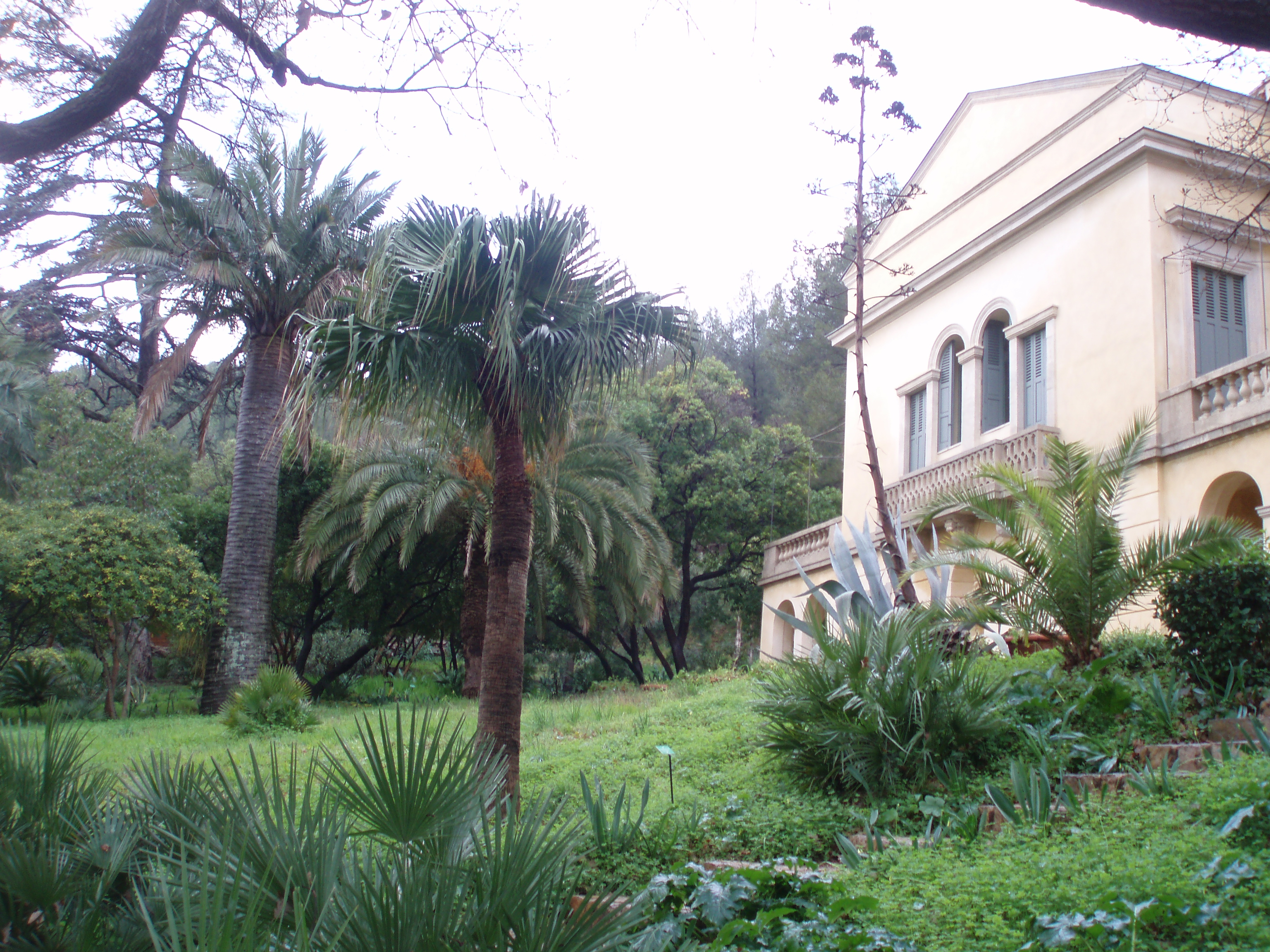
- Interactive map of Le Plantier de Costebelle
- Location: Hyères, Var, Provence-Alpes-Côte d'Azur, France
- Coordinates: 43°05′45″N 6°07′12″E
- Designer: Victor Trotobas; Sponsor: Baroness de Prailly
- Type: Vacation home (Palladian architecture)
- Completion date: 1857 – 1861
- Owner: Baroness de Prailly (1857–1879) (Note: The dates mentioned in the infobox next to successive owners refer to the periods during which they held the estate, not their birth and death dates.); Countess of Guichen (1879–1896); Paul Bourget (1896–1935); General Daille (1935–1978); Admiral Daille (1978–1996); Private individuals (since 1996)

Listed as a HM (1976, facades and roofs) Remarkable garden (2009) Maisons des Illustres (2017)

Le Plantier de Costebelle is a house built in neo-Palladian style starting in 1857 by Baroness Hortense Pauline Husson de Prailly. Located in the commune of Hyères-les-Palmiers, in the Var department, on the eastern slope of Mont des Oiseaux and the hills of Costebelle, the property overlooks the roadstead of Hyères, the Giens peninsula, and the islands of Porquerolles and Port-Cros. A vacation residence in the second half of the 19th century for prominent ecclesiastics (Dominican Father Henri Lacordaire and the Bishop of Orléans, Monsignor Félix Dupanloup), the "Villa des Palmiers" (as named by Hortense de Prailly) also welcomed the Legitimist writer Armand de Pontmartin. But the most illustrious visit to date remains the 1892 stay at the Villa des Palmiers by Queen Victoria, accompanied by Prince Henry of Battenberg.

In 1896, the French novelist and academician Paul Bourget (1852–1935), author of Le Disciple, purchased the property, which then took its current name, "Le Plantier de Costebelle". There, he hosted numerous prominent figures from the literary world—such as André Gide, Henry James, and Edith Wharton—from the political sphere (Lady Randolph Churchill, Charles Maurras, Maurice Barrès), and even from the military world (Marshal Joseph Joffre), until his death in 1935. The estate was then passed on to the novelist's heir, General Marius Daille.

The house has been partially listed in the supplementary inventory of historical monuments by an order dated December 26, 1976. Its botanical park has carried the "Remarkable Garden" label since November 2009. After many years of renovation aimed at restoring the architectural and botanical ensemble as envisioned by Hortense de Prailly in the 19th century, Le Plantier de Costebelle is today a writer's house, combining private residence with partial public access under certain conditions.

== History of the property ==
At the origin of the Plantier de Costebelle estate was a vast estate owned by Louis Jacques Odier, a member of the Sovereign Council of the Republic of Geneva, as early as 1822. Dominique Honoré Peillon and his wife, née Marguerite Adélaïde Eydoux, residents of Hyères, became the new owners in 1840. Following the expropriation of Mr. Peillon and during a public auction on April 1, 1851, the estate was sold to Ernest Desclozeaux. The July Monarchy had made him a magistrate. He was later elected deputy for Embrun in the Hautes-Alpes. But after the French Revolution of 1848, he withdrew from political life. In 1857, Ernest Desclozeaux sold a plot of land to the Baroness de Prailly. This marks the birth of the Plantier de Costebelle estate.

=== Baroness Hortense Pauline Husson de Prailly, Villa des Palmiers ===
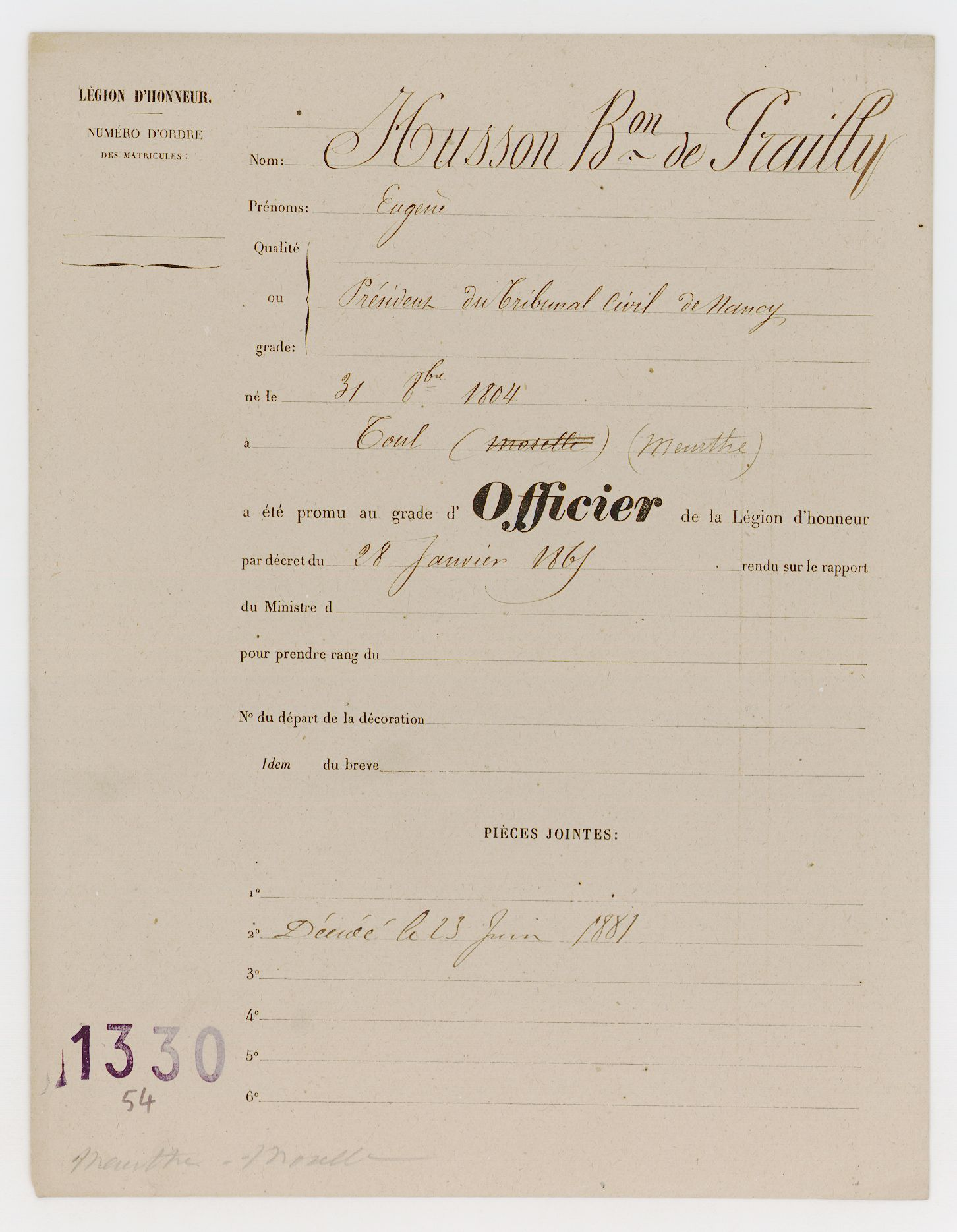
Legion of Honor file of Baron de Prailly (National Archives).

==== Family origins and construction ====
Hortense Chevandier de Valdrome (1813–1879) married in 1834 Baron Husson de Prailly (1804–1881), president of the civil court of first instance in Nancy and officer of the Legion of Honor. Both families originated from Lorraine. Hortense de Prailly's father, Jean Auguste Chevandier de Valdrome, who had been elevated to the dignity of Peer of France under the July Monarchy, was director of the glassworks in Cirey-sur-Vezouze, thanks to his marriage, under the Empire, to a Miss Guaita. (Note: The Von Guaita (or Guaïta) family originates from the Menaggio Valley near Lake Como. They later settled in Frankfurt and became co-owners of the Saint-Quirin glassworks. Hortense de Prailly's father, Jean-Auguste Chevandier de Valdrome (1781–1865), was caricatured by Honoré Daumier in the series Célébrités du Juste Milieu.)

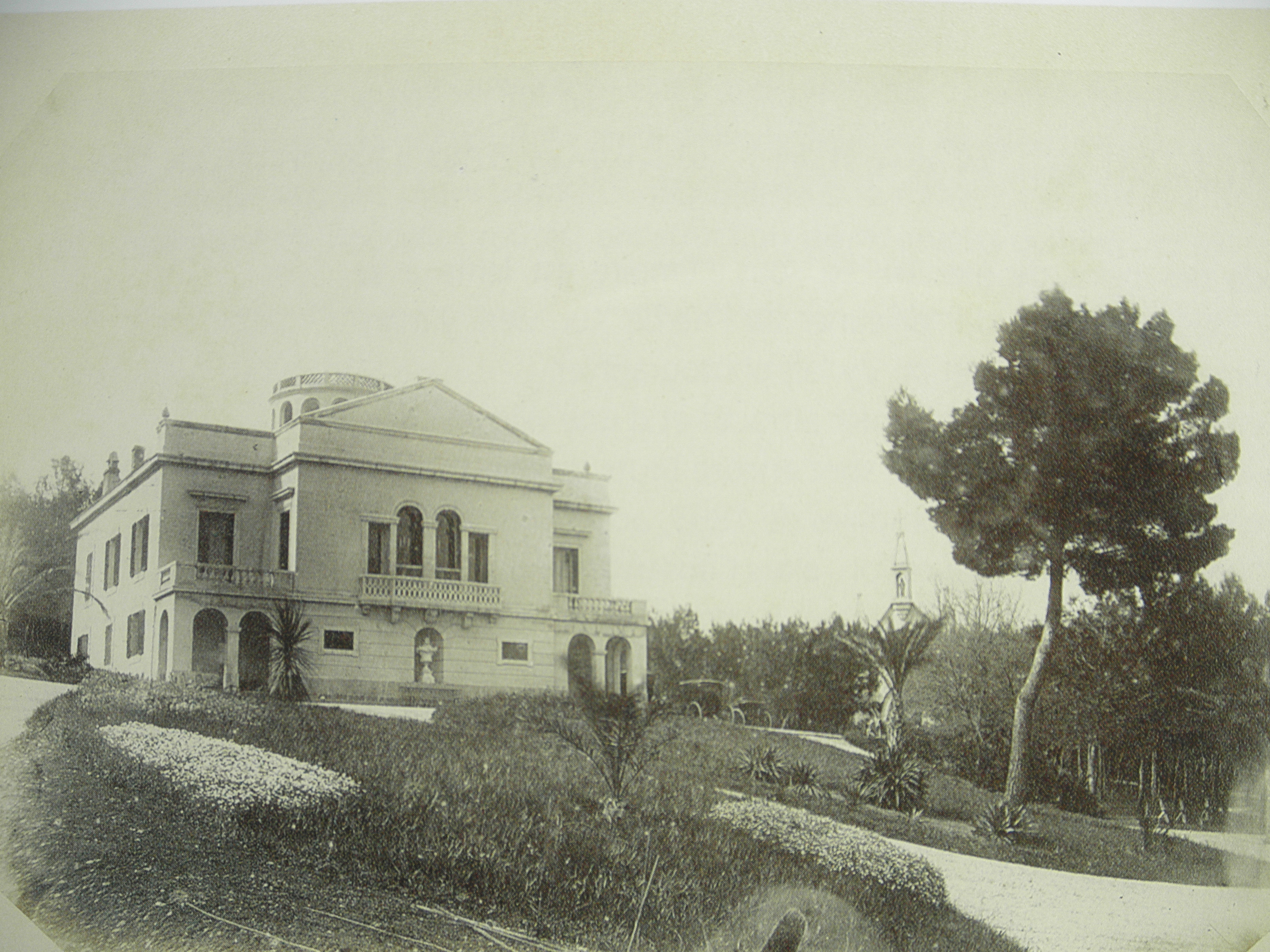
Le Plantier de Costebelle in 1863; horse-drawn carriages can be seen to the right of the building. (Note: Photograph taken in 1863 by Count Alfred Odart de Parigny as part of a photo album of villas in Hyères.)

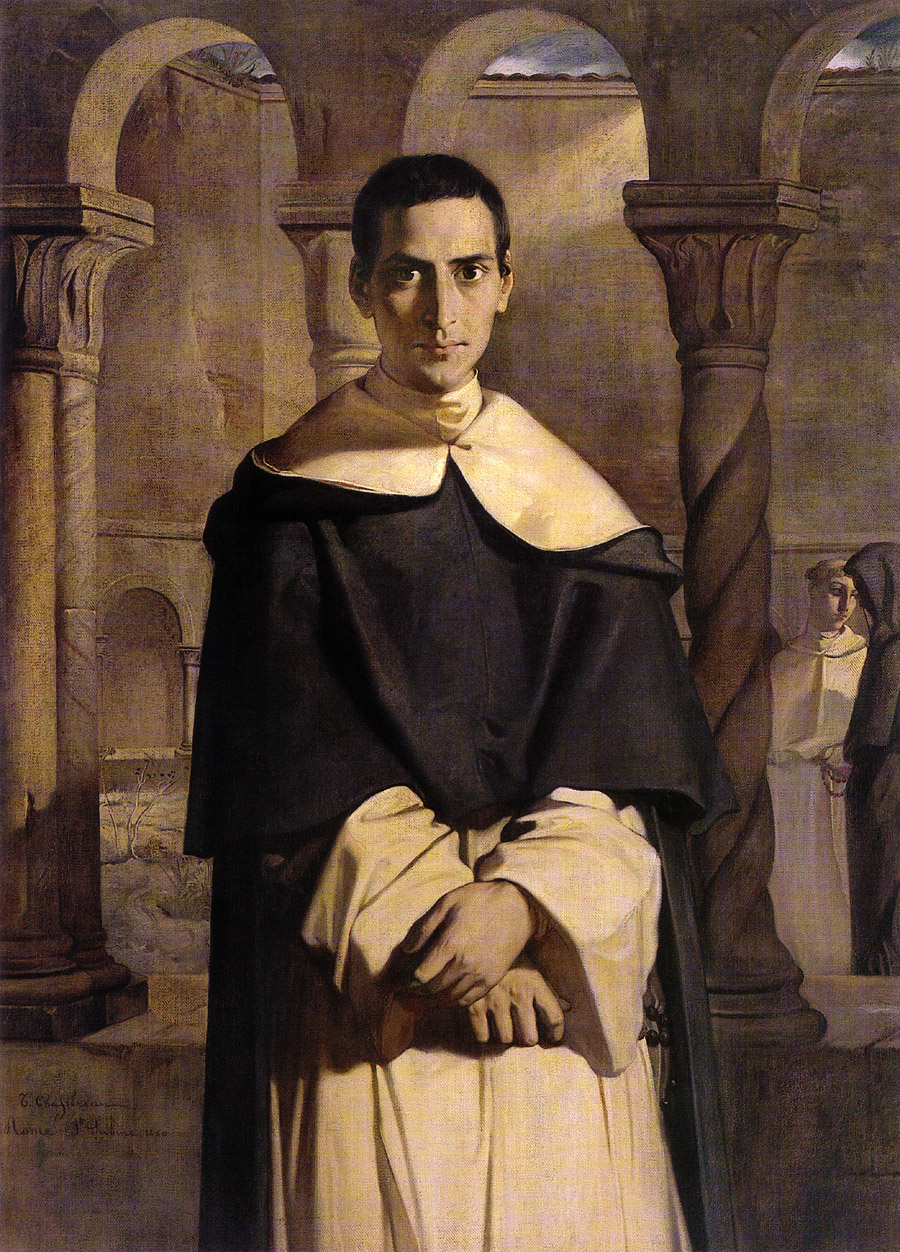
Henri-Dominique Lacordaire at the Convent of Santa Sabina in Rome, by Théodore Chassériau (1840), Louvre Museum

At the age of 27, Hortense Chevandier de Valdrome regularly stayed in Italy (Pisa, Lucca, Rome) for health reasons. In July 1840, she stayed at the Baths of Lucca, a famous spa resort. She traveled to Rome in the autumn of 1840, (Note: Théodore Chassériau was a friend of Hortense de Prailly's brother, Paul Chevandier de Valdrome (1817–1877). Chassériau painted the famous portrait of Lacordaire thanks to the intervention of the Baroness de Prailly, who introduced them to each other. But the relationship between Lacordaire and Chassériau deteriorated. The painter also fell out with Paul Chevandier and his sister, Madame de Prailly, with whom relations bordered on the inappropriate (meaning disrespectful comments about religion made by Chassériau), see letter from Henri Lehmann to Marie d'Agoult, March 2, 1841, archives of Count Hautecloque.) where she was surrounded by a select French society and met Father Jandel, prior of the Sainte-Sabine convent and originally from Nancy. In Rome, she hosted her brother, Paul Chevandier de Valdrome, and a friend, Théodore Chassériau. The latter drew for her Deux femmes dans une forêt (1841), an idealized representation of friendship.

It was the harsh climate of their native lands—the Château de Lettenbach, where Hortense de Prailly was born, and her father's estate of Sainte-Catherine in the Vosges—as well as the lady's fragile health that prompted the Praillys to settle on the lower slopes of Mont des Oiseaux, at Costebelle, on the shores of the Mediterranean Sea. From 1841, Baroness de Prailly rented from Dominique Peillon and then from Ernest Desclozeaux a farm and the adjoining lands, which she would purchase sixteen years later, in 1857.

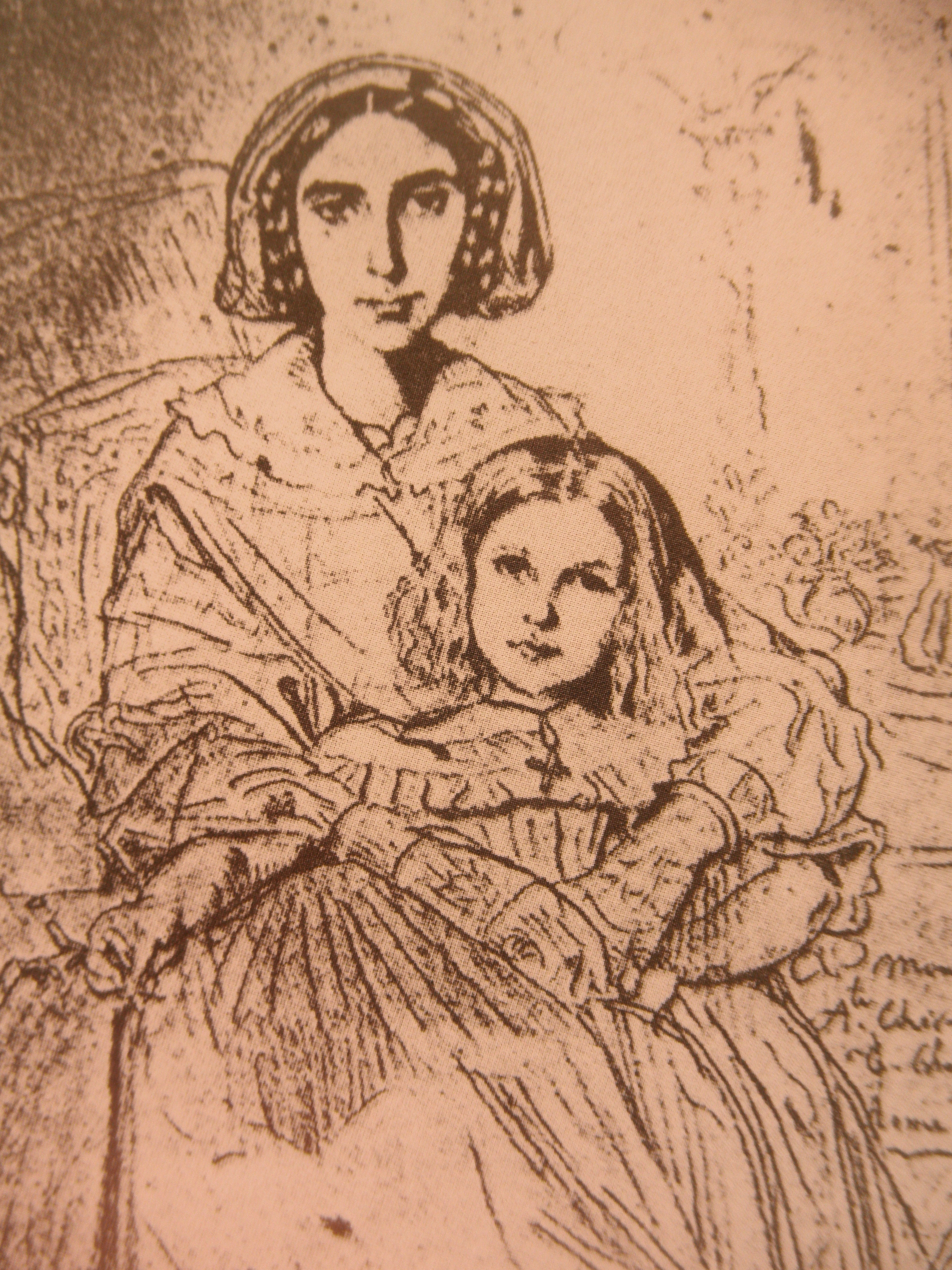
Hortense de Prailly and her daughter Berthe.

A graphite drawing made in Rome in January 1841 by Théodore Chassériau appears to be the only known portrait of Hortense de Prailly, then aged 28. She is depicted seated, turned slightly to the right. After being part of the drawing collection gathered by John Postle Heseltine, this portrait—at the time wrongly attributed to Jean-Auguste-Dominique Ingres—entered the Ashmolean Museum in Oxford in 1941, where it has been displayed ever since.

After acquiring the various parcels from Ernest Desclozeaux and the Arène family, (Note: The Château de la Font des Horts or "Rescence Arène" recalls the olive-growing past of Louis Arène's estate (1818), thanks to its mill and water resurgence. Arène, a commoner and former émigré, expanded and redesigned the property with wealth acquired in Naples (from perfumeries), purchasing part of it from the heirs of the Marquise de Monclar (Château d'Apt).) Baroness de Prailly undertook the construction of a Palladian-style villa and commissioned an architect who, at that time and thanks to Mayor Alphonse Denis, oversaw all major public projects aimed at developing Hyères as a resort: Victor Trotobas (1807–1884). During the years of construction, she lived in the nearby farm by the construction site, which later became the guest house of the estate—the very place where Paul Bourget would host his guests starting in 1896.

The villa was named "Villa des Palmiers." Baroness de Prailly took inspiration from the exotic garden of Château Denis (Note: By the end of the 19th century, all that remained of Château Denis was a public square, but its head gardener, Charles Huber, had meanwhile developed a large nursery, which continued to operate until the early 20th century, run by another big name in the profession.) in downtown Hyères, and with the help of Charles Huber, a horticulturist from Hyères, she recreated a landscaped park, integrating rare palm trees among native species. These palms were then exclusively marketed across France by the acclimatizer from Hyères: the Phoenix dactylifera. She notably introduced Yucca filifera, which flowered for the first time in France at the Villa des Palmiers in 1876. The exotic garden of the Villa des Palmiers was designed by the owners in the style of the acclimatization gardens that emerged on the French Riviera and throughout the Mediterranean coast from the mid-century onward (such as Villa Victoria in Grasse, Hanbury at Capo Mortola, Villa Thuret at Cap d'Antibes, Villas Vigier and Les Tropiques in Nice, Villas Valetta and Camille–Amélie in Cannes, Villa Eilenroc, and especially the Domaine des Cèdres in Saint-Jean-Cap-Ferrat).

The work undertaken was substantial, both for the construction of the villa and chapel and for the impressive enclosing wall ordered by the Baroness, which entirely encloses the five-hectare estate. It appears, moreover, that the wall's construction preceded that of the buildings. Along with their immediate neighbors, the Praillys planned the construction of a road serviced by an omnibus.

==== Father Lacordaire and Monseigneur Dupanloup ====
The Baroness also had a chapel built adjacent to the main house, which was blessed for the first time by her spiritual director, "her first and only true Father," the Dominican priest Henri Lacordaire. In the final years of his life, Lacordaire was a regular guest at Costebelle. (Note: Letters from Madame de Prailly to Father Lacordaire are mainly kept at the Lacordaire Archives, Dominican Archives of France, 45 bis rue de la Glacière, 75013 Paris.)

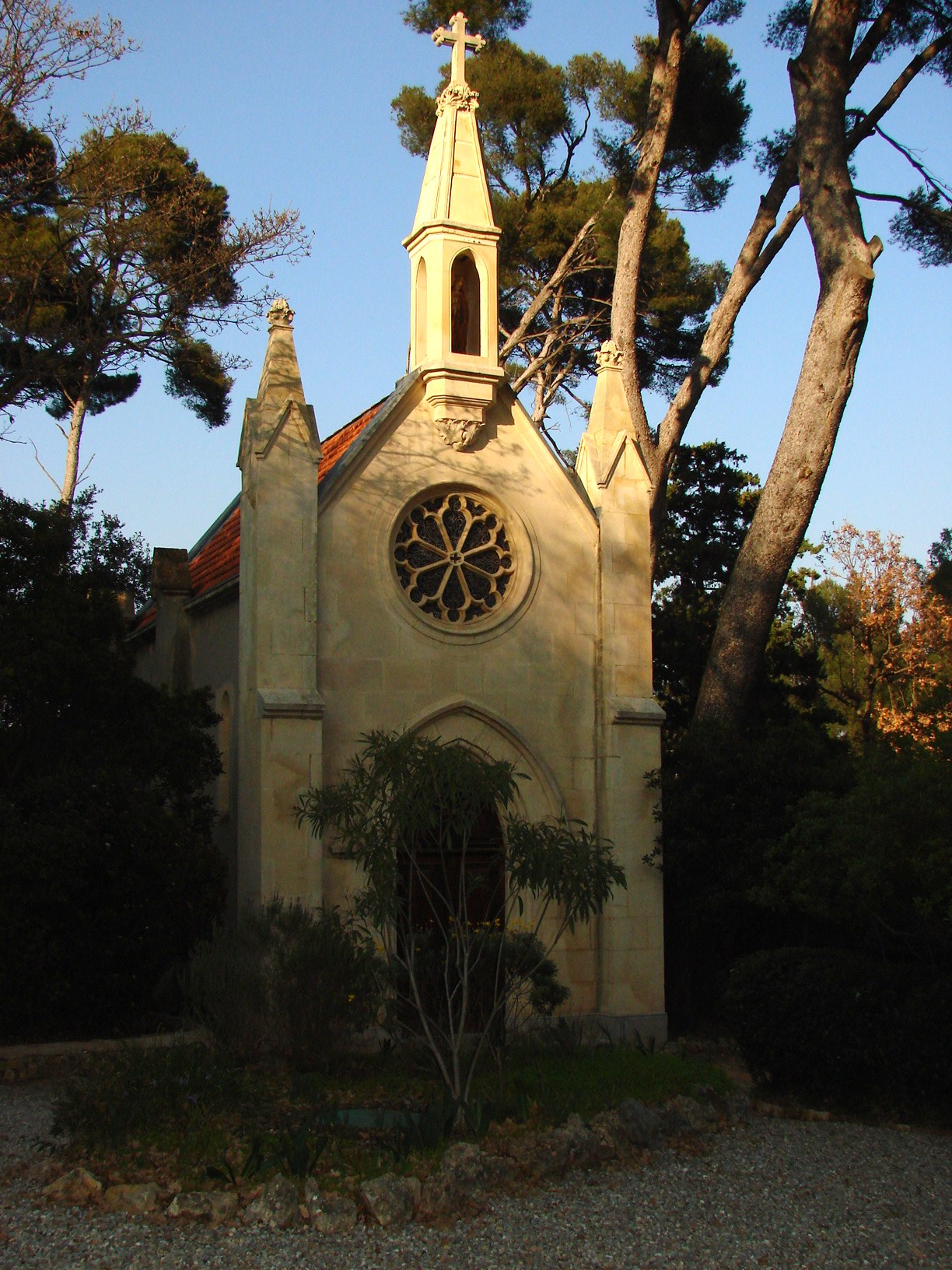
The Plantier Chapel.

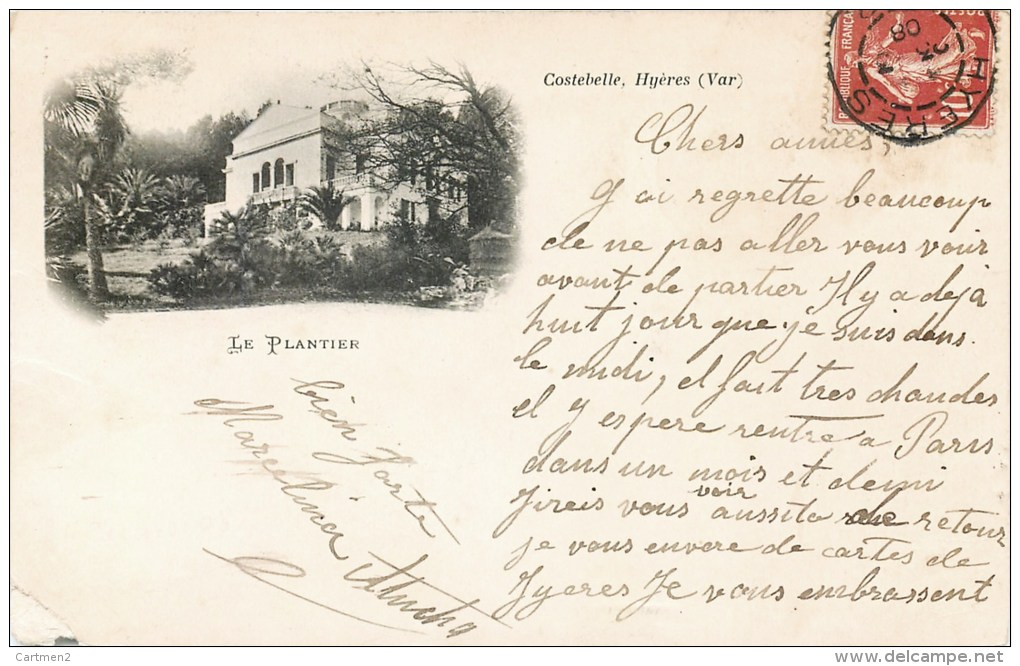
Le Plantier de Costebelle circa 1880–1910.

Father Lacordaire had known Hortense de Prailly since 1835, when he came to preach in Nancy, and the baroness was only 22 years old; their first meeting took place at the Cirey glassworks, at the home of Eugène Chevandier de Valdrome. Strangely, this chapel was more luxurious than the house itself. But the Baroness de Prailly was very devout, probably even more so than her brother Eugène Chevandier de Valdrome, who served as Minister of the Interior in the Émile Ollivier Cabinet, the government of reconciliation with the Catholics. Her sincere and fervent faith was noticed by those around her, and Madame Swetchine—Lacordaire's Russian friend and advisor—spoke of her being in a "state of possession".

It is thus possible to consider the Baroness de Prailly as belonging to a circle concerned with religious revival, which included many Legitimists. Certain letters from Madame Swetchine support this view, mentioning a certain Baroness "de P." who was "completely exceptional". She also welcomed to the Villa des Palmiers the Legitimist writer Armand de Pontmartin (1811–1890), known for his criticism of the Encyclopedists, as well as Abbé Joseph Perdrau, parish priest of the church of Saint-Étienne-du-Mont, and likely also Monseigneur Saivet.

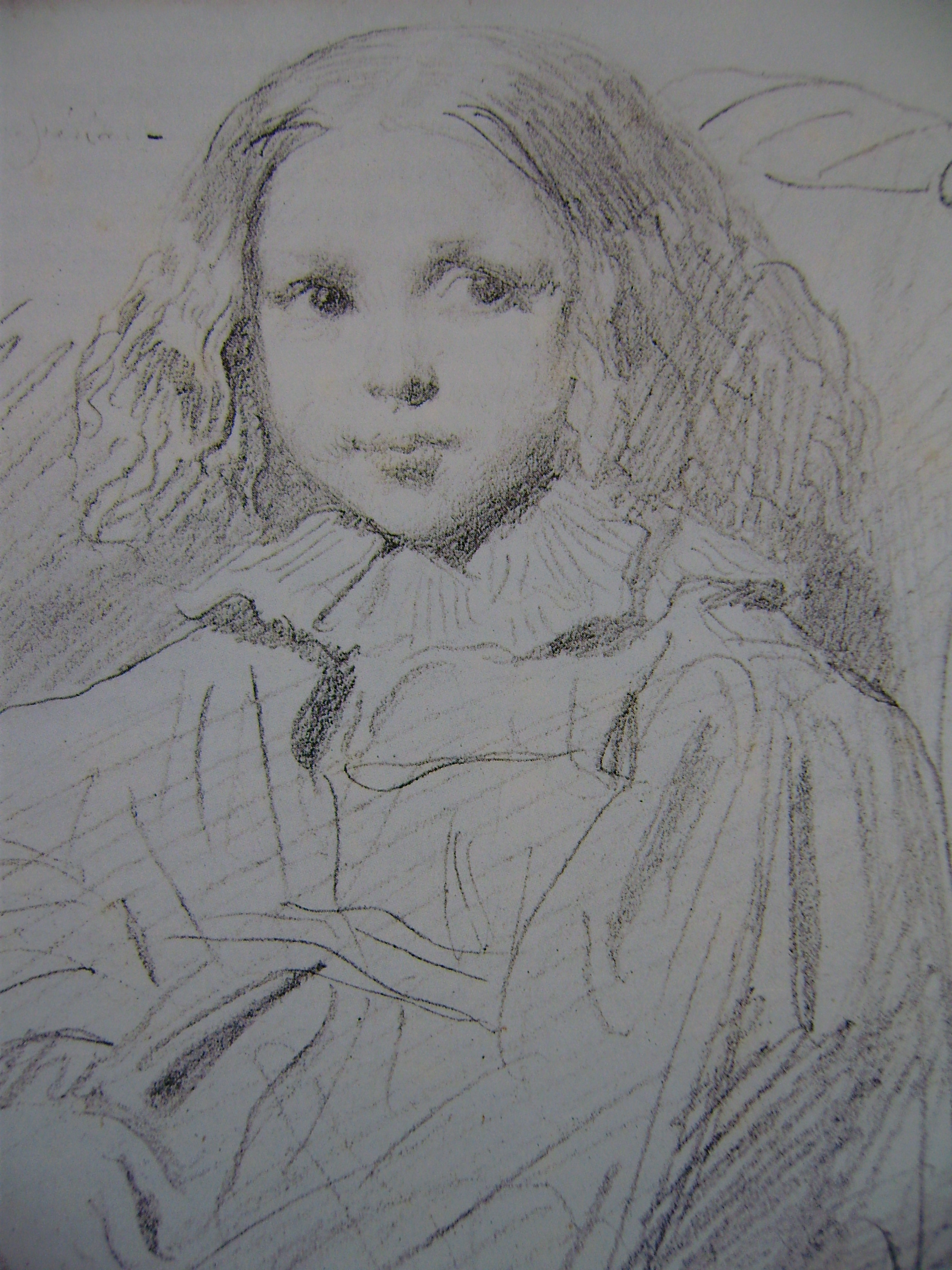
Berthe de Prailly by Théodore Chassériau (J. Bonna Collection).

Another distinguished guest who was a regular at the home of Hortense de Prailly was the Bishop of Orléans, Monseigneur Félix Dupanloup, who frequently stayed there in 1877–1878. The famous Catholic orator divided his time in Hyères between the Villa Jenny (Note: Villa Jenny, now called "Villa Saint Antoine", is located on rue de l'Ascension in the Orient district of Hyères.)—owned by Count de Rocheplatte, of a noble Orléans family and loyal diocesan (Note: The Count of Rocheplatte, appointed mayor of Orléans by Louis XVIII in 1816, owned the Château de Rocheplatte in Aulnay-la-Rivière, where he hosted an elite circle of scholars, including Mgr Dupanloup.)—and the Villa des Palmiers, where he celebrated Mass in the chapel. Hortense de Prailly had horizontal stations arranged along a path winding through the slopes of her property for the bishop. At the Villa des Palmiers, Monseigneur Dupanloup met Armand de Pontmartin, author of Causeries littéraires, who had also been invited by his hostess in March 1878. As with Father Lacordaire, the Baroness de Prailly maintained extensive correspondence with Monseigneur Dupanloup.

Adolphe Chevandier de Valdrome, Hortense de Prailly's paternal uncle and an officer under the First Empire, also resided for many years at the Villa des Palmiers. This former aide-de-camp to General Détrès in Murat's army distinguished himself during the Russian campaign and at Danzig. He reunited with the Baroness de Prailly in Rome in 1840. Hortense de Prailly began with him the series of religious conversions she inspired within her family. The Villa des Palmiers also welcomed the baroness's brothers: the Lorraine-born Eugène Chevandier de Valdrome, an industrialist and authoritative minister in the 1870 Émile Ollivier Cabinet; the painter Paul Chevandier de Valdrome; and his son Paul Armand, a future consular agent.

=== Berthe Husson de Prailly, Countess of Guichen ===
==== Family origins ====
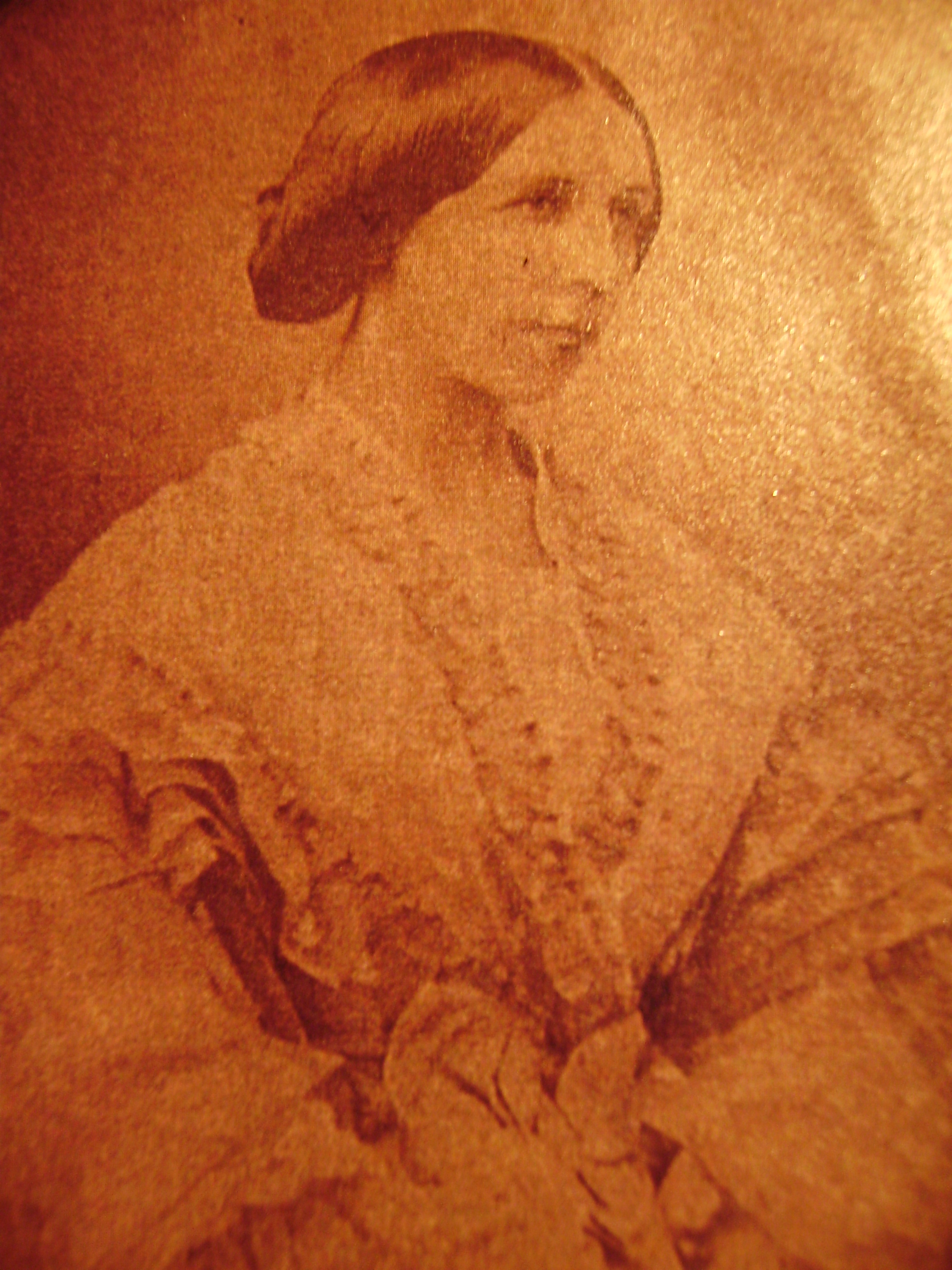
Berthe de Guichen.

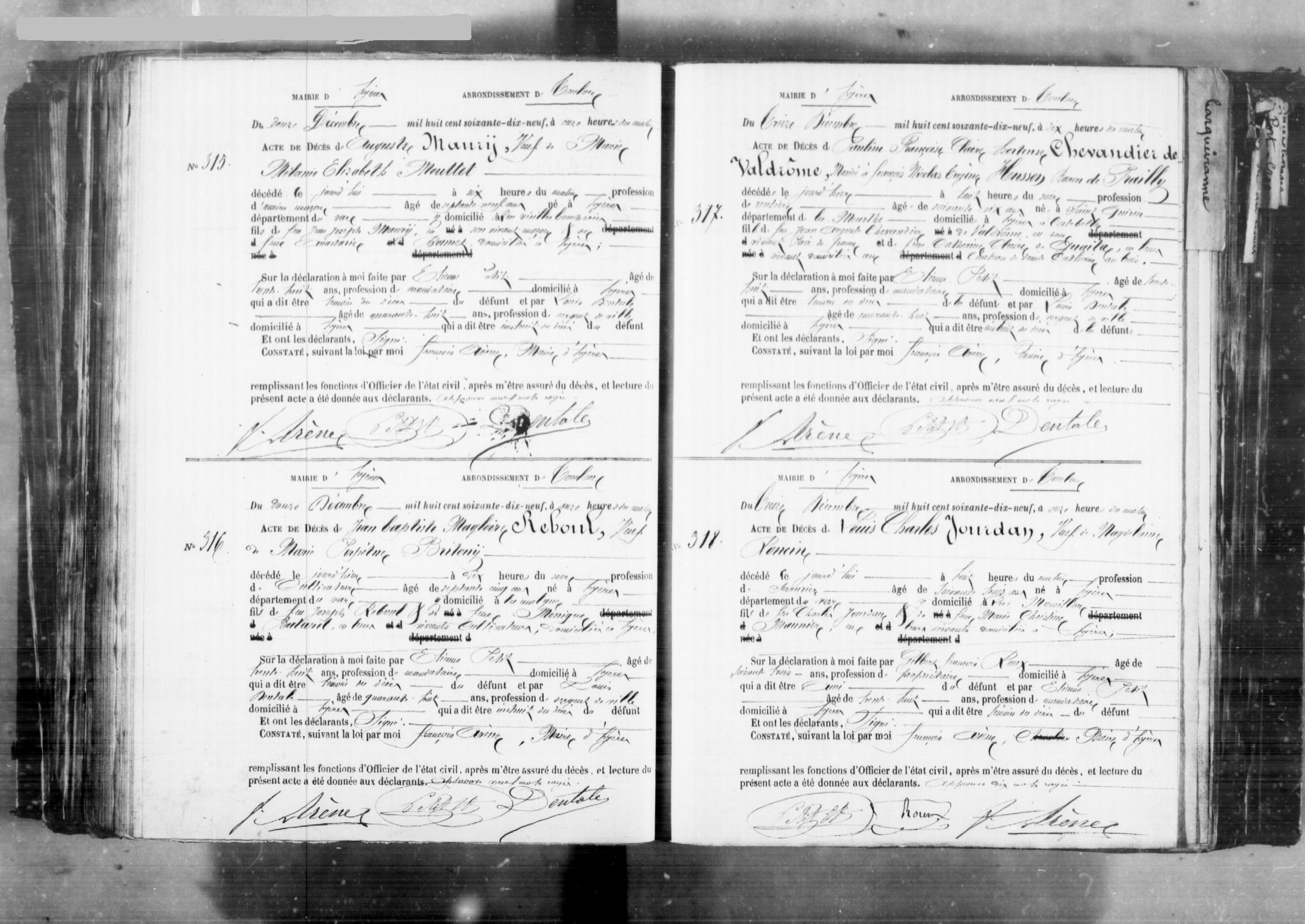
Death certificate of the Baroness of Prailly, 1879.

The daughter of Madame de Prailly, Berthe (1835–1910), married Alphonse Luc Maxime du Bouëxic, Count of Guichen (1822–1894), on 29 September 1867. A squadron leader in the Chasseurs d'Afrique, the Count of Guichen belonged to the "du Tremblement" class at Saint-Cyr. He was descended collaterally from the famous Luc Urbain du Bouëxic de Guichen (1712–1790), who had fought in the American War of Independence, enabling some of his descendants to become members of the highly exclusive Society of the Cincinnati. Upon the death of the Baroness de Prailly in Hyères on 12 December 1879, the Countess of Guichen inherited the estate, and the Villa des Palmiers became her residence.

The only surviving depictions of Berthe de Guichen as a child are three drawings by Théodore Chassériau, made in Rome around 1840–1841. Two are half-length portraits of a child, facing forward, with the torso turned slightly left and right. One of these two (in graphite and stump), documented and often published, remained in the family until 1991 and entered the Paris art market in 1999. It is now part of the private drawing collection assembled by the Calvinist banker Jean A. Bonna of Geneva, who, besides his work with Lombard Odier bank, chairs the Martin Bodmer Foundation, one of the world's most prestigious private libraries, based in Cologny. The third drawing, identified in a private collection by Louis-Antoine Prat in 1996, depicts Hortense Pauline de Prailly holding her daughter Berthe on her lap.

==== Queen Victoria at the Villa des Palmiers ====
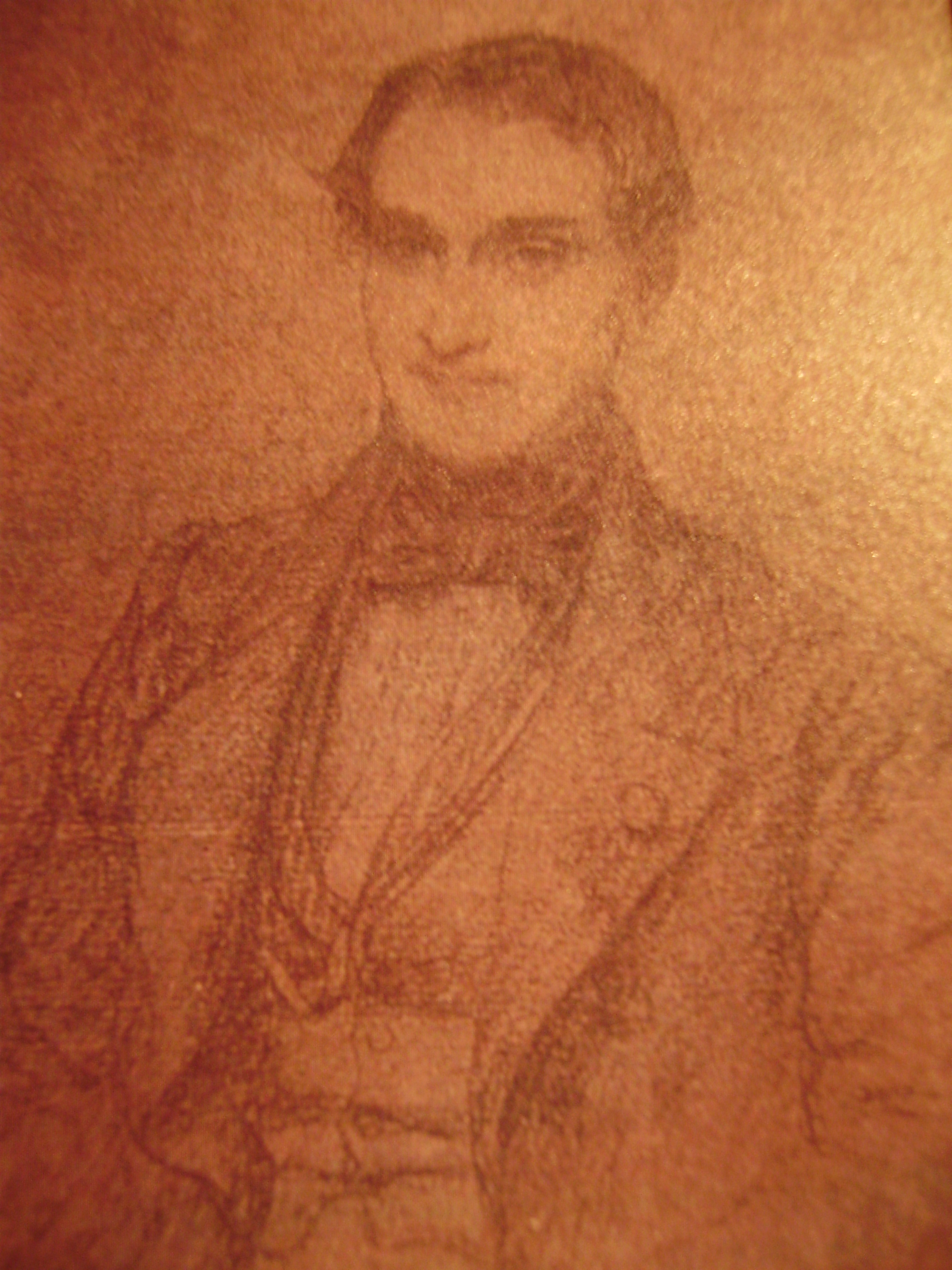
Alphonse de Guichen.

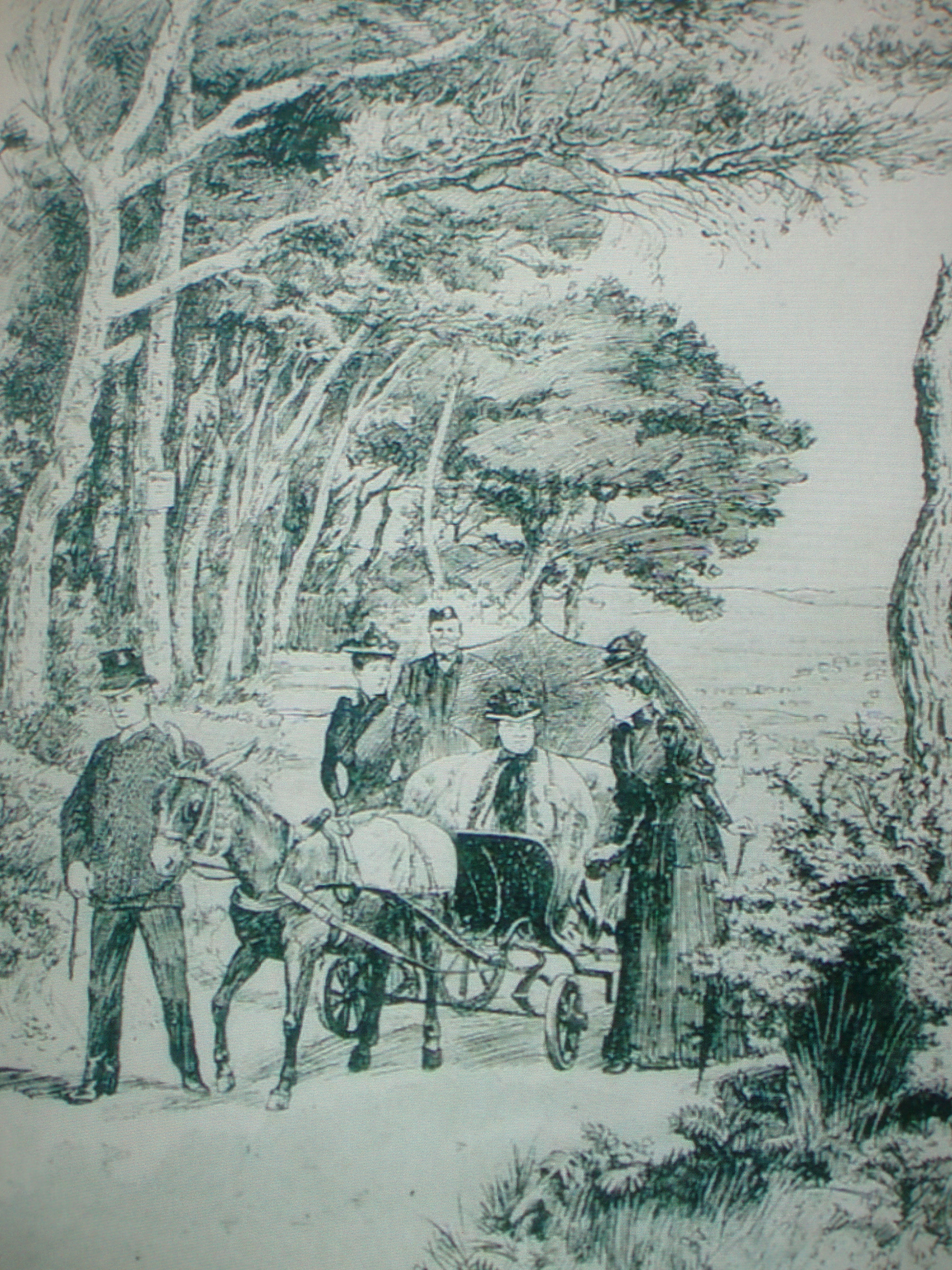
Queen Victoria at Plantier de Costebelle (Villa des Palmiers).

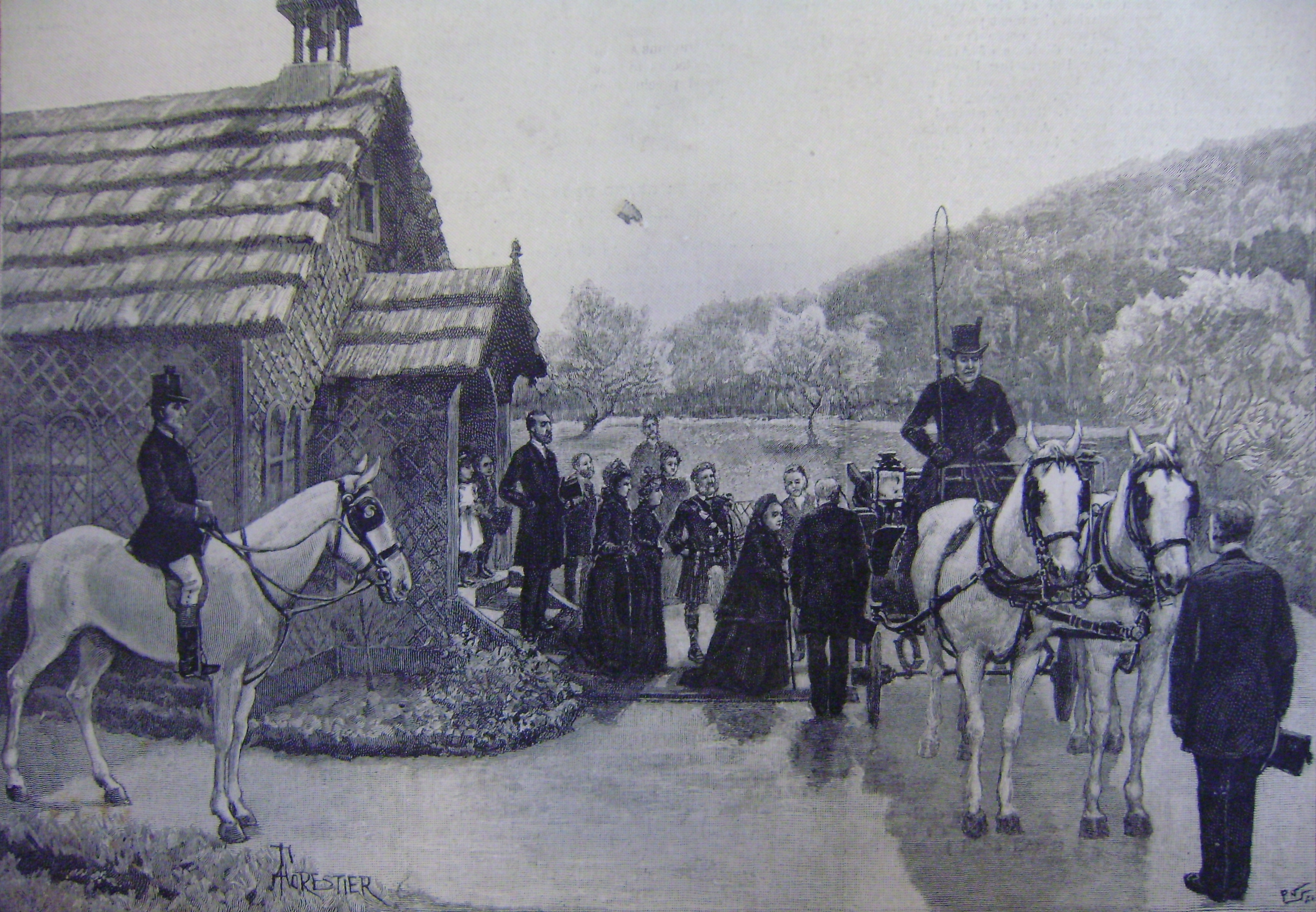
Queen Victoria arriving at the Anglican chapel in Costebelle (All Saints Church) after visiting the Villa des Palmiers. In the background, the Plantier pine forest.

On 23 March 1892, the Count and Countess of Guichen hosted Queen Victoria, who had chosen Hyères as her holiday destination on the French Riviera. The monarch resided in Costebelle, possibly at the Villa des Palmiers (Note: According to minority and unreliable sources, Queen Victoria is said to have resided at Plantier de Costebelle: Boyer 2002, p. 82; Boyer, Marc (2009). L'hiver dans le midi [Winter in the south] (in French). Paris: L'Harmattan. p. 99. ISBN 978-2-296-10682-6. & Sagaert 2010, p. 128.) before moving definitively to the Hôtel de Costebelle and the Hôtel de l'Ermitage. She arrived at her hosts' home accompanied by Princess Beatrice and the chaplain of the Anglican Church of Costebelle, "All Saints Church," Reverend Archibald Knollys. As a token of gratitude, Victoria offered the owners of the Villa des Palmiers a rare variety of tulip, imported from India, which still blooms in the park. The English-language press of the time closely followed the Queen's visit to the French Riviera, documenting her every move. It reported that Victoria visited the Guichen family multiple times and that a special path had been laid within the Villa des Palmiers to accommodate the Queen and her carriage, often pulled by Jacquot, the famous little gray donkey who drove her through the fragrant pine trails of Costebelle.

During her outings in the small cart pulled by Jacquot, Lady Balmoral (the Queen's pseudonym during private travels) visited nearby estates that welcomed her. She was always accompanied by her famous footman, a kilted Scottish Highlander (seen in the background at right in an engraving, with beard and bonnet), and by a close escort of about ten Bengal Lancers wearing turbans. Numerous villas were made available to the British court, to Prince Henry of Battenberg, the Duke and Duchess of Rutland, or the Duke and Duchess of Connaught in Costebelle: the Villa des Palmiers first and foremost, but also the Villa Costebelle (Count de Léautaud), Villa Sylvabelle (Duke Decazes), Villa Montclair (Duchess of Grafton), Villa Sainte-Cécile (Ambroise Thomas), Villa des Oiseaux (owned by flutist Paul Taffanel), Château Saint-Pierre-des-Horts (botanist Germain de Saint-Pierre), Villa La Boccage (Lady Charlotte Smith-Barry), Château de San Salvadour (Edmond Magnier), Villa Almanarre (Mr. and the Hon. Mrs. Clowes), Villa Luquette (Major Ellis), and the home of Mr. Arène at Font des Horts.

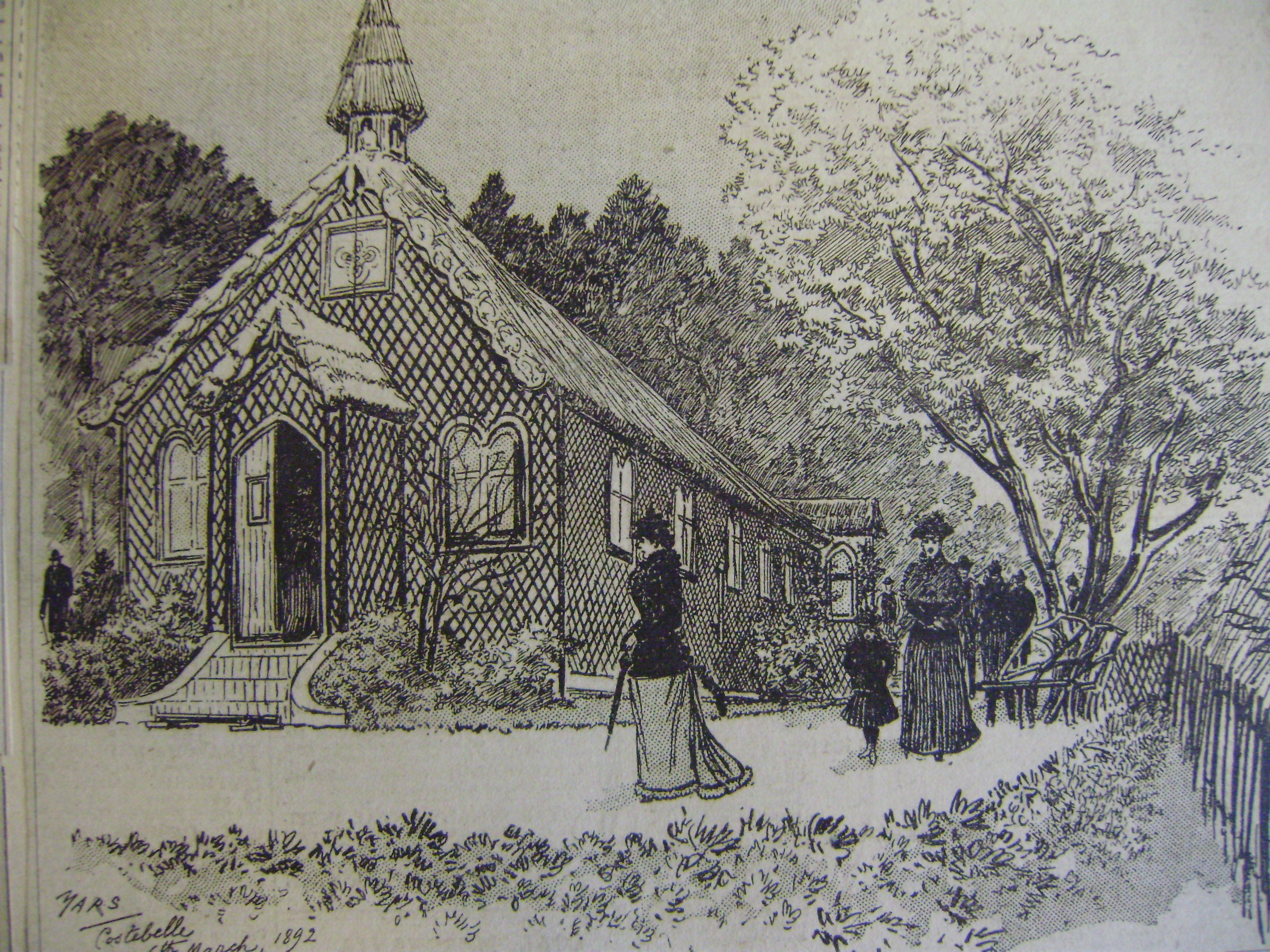
The Countess of Guichen arriving at the Anglican chapel in Costebelle to welcome Queen Victoria.

In April 1892, as her stay in Hyères came to an end, Queen Victoria sent her thanks to the Count de Guichen through General Sir Henry Ponsonby, Her Majesty's private secretary. The Guichen family, like all villa owners in the Costebelle district, had sent Princess Beatrice a bouquet of flowers for her birthday on 14 April 1892.

In 1896, the Countess of Guichen, a widow for two years, parted with the Villa des Palmiers and retired to her château at Cirey-sur-Vezouze, where she died on 30 October 1910. (Note: Death notice of Berthe d'Husson de Prailly, Countess of Guichen, who passed away on October 30, 1910, in Cirey at the age of 75, mentioning family ties with many allied families.)

=== Paul Bourget ===
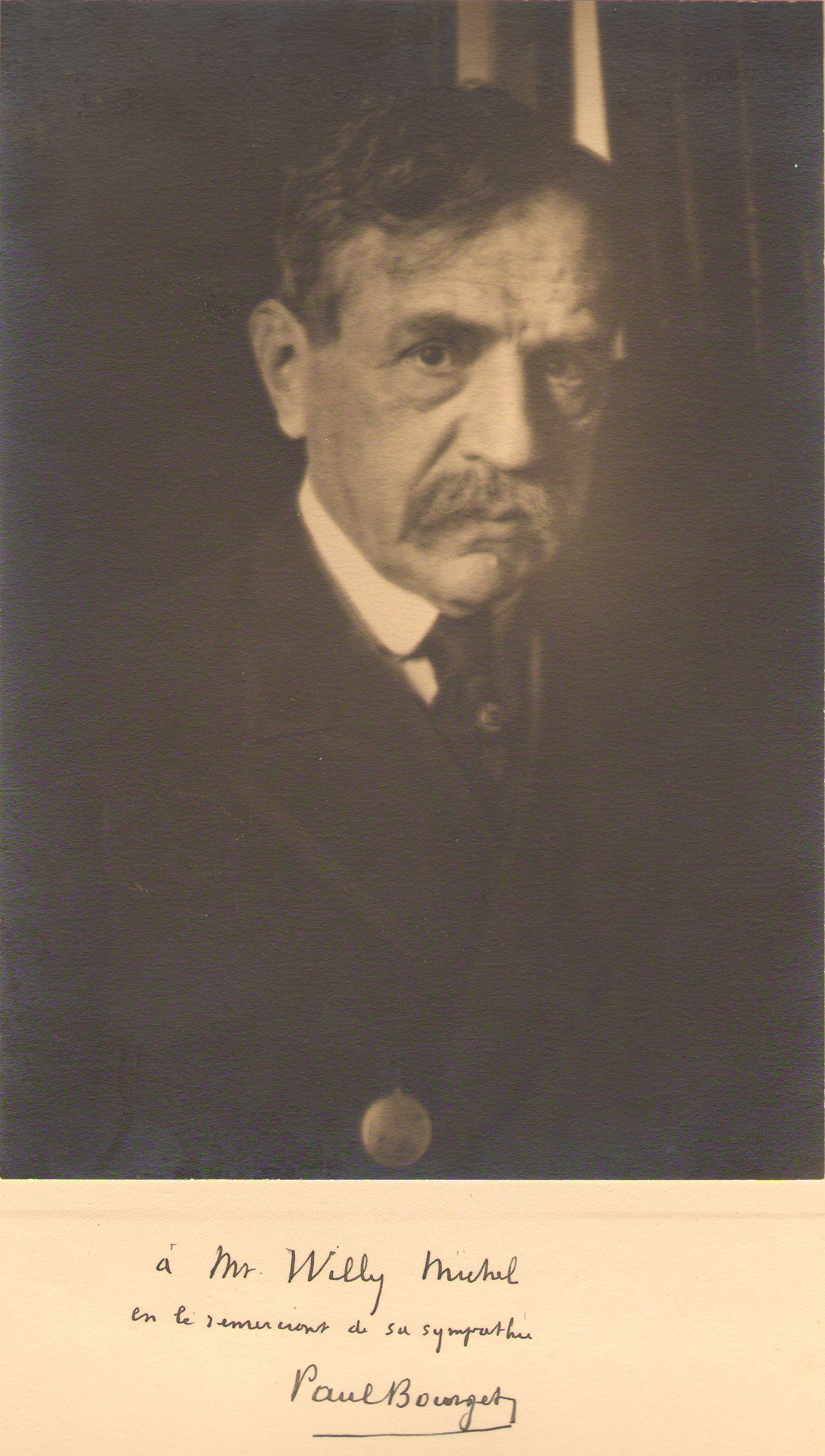
The writer Paul Bourget, owner of Le Plantier between 1896 and 1935.

The master of the psychological novel purchased the Villa des Palmiers from Berthe de Guichen in 1896 and, until his death in 1935, welcomed numerous prominent figures there. He is the one who gave the property its current name: Le Plantier de Costebelle.

At the time, the season in Hyères was winter. Becoming a loyal winter resident, (Note: Paul Bourget held the role of "Maintainer" of the resort since Hyères, already in decline at that time (2 km from the sea), faced competition from emerging destinations along the "grand" French Riviera: Nice, Cannes, Antibes. In 1952, for the centenary of the writer's birth, two plaques bearing this title were placed on the façades of the Plantier de Costebelle by Hyères mayor Joseph Clotis.) the novelist received many famous guests at Le Plantier—literary, political, medical, and military figures—such as: Maurice Barrès, Edmond Jaloux, Professor Grasset, Pierre Benoit, Marquis Paul de Richard d'Ivry (composer), Jean-Louis Vaudoyer, Henry Bordeaux, Charles Maurras, Francis Carco (who recounts in Bohème d'artiste the burglary his host suffered at Le Plantier), Matilde Serao, André Beaunier, Gabriel Hanotaux (then Minister of Foreign Affairs), Professor Charles Richet, Émile Ripert, William James in 1900, José-Maria de Heredia, André Gide, Marshal Joffre, General Nivelle, Henry James, Gérard Bauër, Gaston Jollivet, and even Lady Randolph Churchill and Cardinal Anatole de Cabrières. In 1898, Luigi Gualdo, a poet and Milanese friend, bequeathed to Paul Bourget some furniture that the author of Le Disciple kept at Le Plantier de Costebelle. However, the most frequent guest at the Bourget household was Edith Wharton (owner of the villa Sainte-Claire-du-Château since 1927), whom he had met in Newport in 1893 when the writer had received from James Gordon Bennett Jr. a commission for a series of articles on the United States. Paul Bourget also held hope of welcoming his friend Jules Claretie to Costebelle. When the novelist gifted him Œuvres complètes, he included a handwritten dedication along with an original pen drawing with the caption: "Caricature of my house in Costebelle, Le Plantier, to invite my friend Claretie to come and visit his devoted, Paul Bourget."

Charles Maurras described the world of the Hyères property where Bourget withdrew from society to engage in profound reflection:

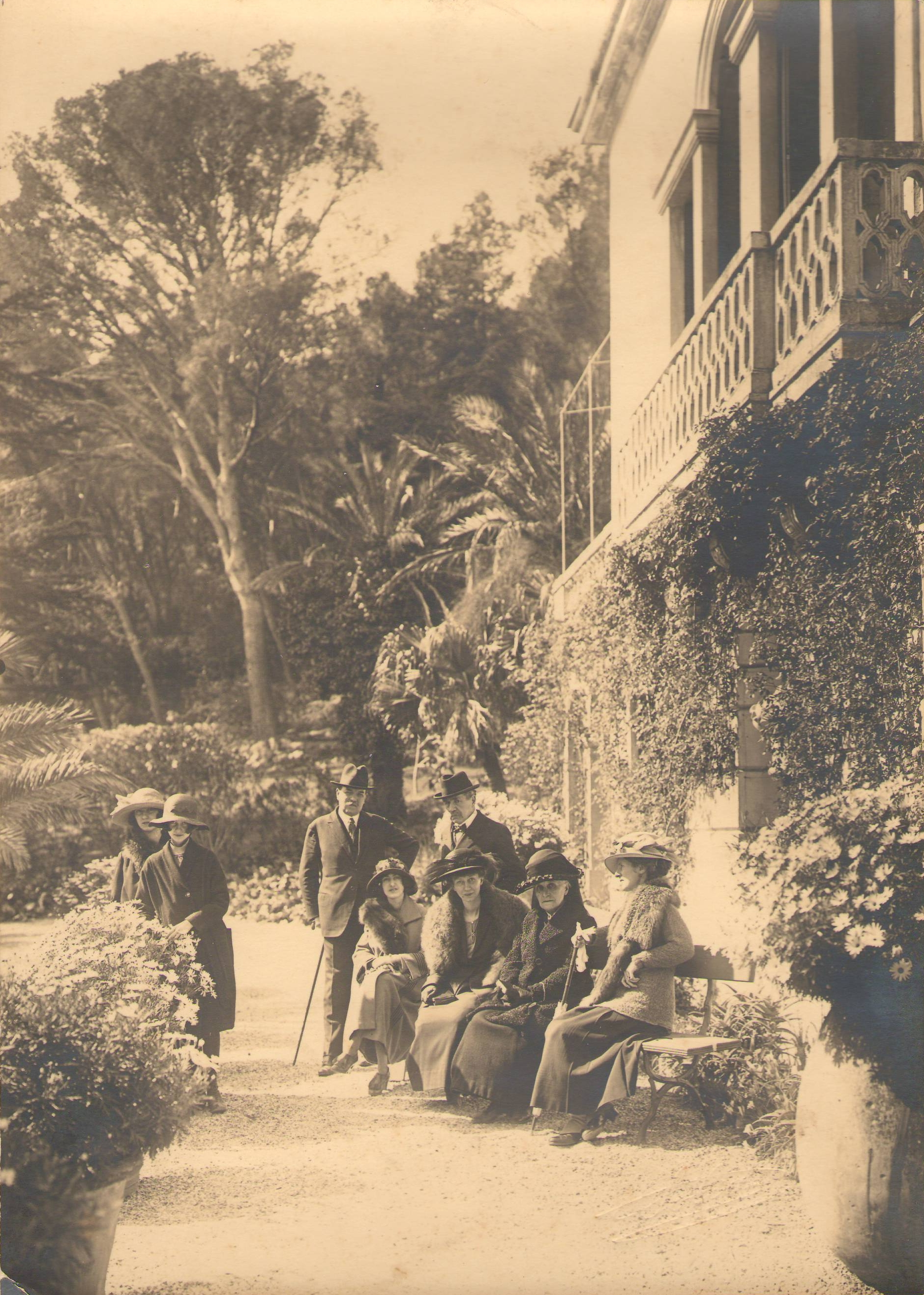
Paul Bourget (right) and Henry Bordeaux (with a cane) at Plantier de Costebelle. Minnie Bourget is seated in the foreground.

(...) And yet, it is not Hyères that Bourget chose, it is Costebelle. Costebelle is a magnificent fold of a pine-covered mountain that blocks hotels and casinos from seeing the islands and the sea. Almost all of Costebelle's primitive wildness has been preserved. Its enclosure of old resinous trees has suffered no desecration. A few gardens are discreetly and cautiously nestled within. Mr. Bourget's house leans against the gentle slope that nature has draped with forest. It is surrounded by man-made flowerbeds. There, twenty species, foreign or native, mingle fraternally. I noticed that they intermingle without clashing and yet without blending. Someone sensed the need to avoid excess and to ensure transitions. Aloes and palm trees welcome the yuccas and bridge the strangeness of these Africans with the shrubs native to the land. Large cedars lazily spiral toward the sky. Finally, amid nearly gigantic hawthorns, vast fields of roses form a sheet of perfume. Among these roses of every kind and shade—sulfur and fire, pure white to bright red—Mr. Bourget shows me, inside a wilting calyx, large bronzed rose chafers, dead from pleasure in the night: 'Here,' I say, 'are roses taken straight from the garden of Epicurus.' (...) and here is Paul Bourget leading me around a path to a small neo-Gothic monument made of local stone: it is the garden chapel. Mass is said there every Sunday, and every day of the week, the author of Le Disciple gauges the depth of his analyses in the austere shadow of that cross. (...)

— M.Paul Bourget dans son jardin, Charles Maurras, La Chronique des livres, vol. I, June–December 1900, pp. 35–38

Very close to the high society of the Third Republic, which the author of Le Disciple frequented in literary salons, the academician continued these social ties during the winter in Costebelle by often visiting the immediate neighbors of Le Plantier, Count and Countess de Léautaud Donine, who owned the Villa Léautaud, (Note: Located at 714 avenue de la Font des Horts, Villa Léautaud was purchased in 1873 by Count Léautaud Donine from the heir of Ernest Desclozeaux, Adrien, and renovated by architect Louis Peyron in 1877. He added three towers to give it nobility. On the main tower's dome, a fleur-de-lis recalls the owners' connection to the House of Orléans. It was then named "Villa Costebelle." Surrounded by a vast park of exotic species (palms, cacti), it shares a border with the Plantier de Costebelle, with which it originally formed a single estate under Ernest Desclozeaux.) or the Arène family, who lived at the estate of La Font des Horts ("spring of the gardens"). Geographically, the five hectares of Le Plantier were enclosed between these two vast properties on the plateau of Costebelle.

During the winter of 1925, Minnie Bourget fractured her femoral neck while getting out of a car on the esplanade of Le Plantier. The Bourgets were immobilized there for most of 1926. Bourget wrote Le Danseur Mondain during this time. This fall was followed by mental degeneration (Minnie had always been in fragile health; she had lived her role as wife in the adored shadow of the illustrious master, which added to her nervous fragility and psychosomatic fatigue a constant sense of guilt and an inferiority complex in a childless world). (Note: Minnie's character and affections are revealed by Marie-Gracieuse Martin-Gistucci in a touching portrait of the wife, complemented by equally endearing writings from Élisabeth Sylvain-David (Paul Bourget et l'Italie), as well as sincere testimonials from Lucien Corpéchot in 1936 (Souvenirs d'un journaliste).)

Minnie David in her youth; Paul Bourget at Le Plantier de Costebelle in the 1920s

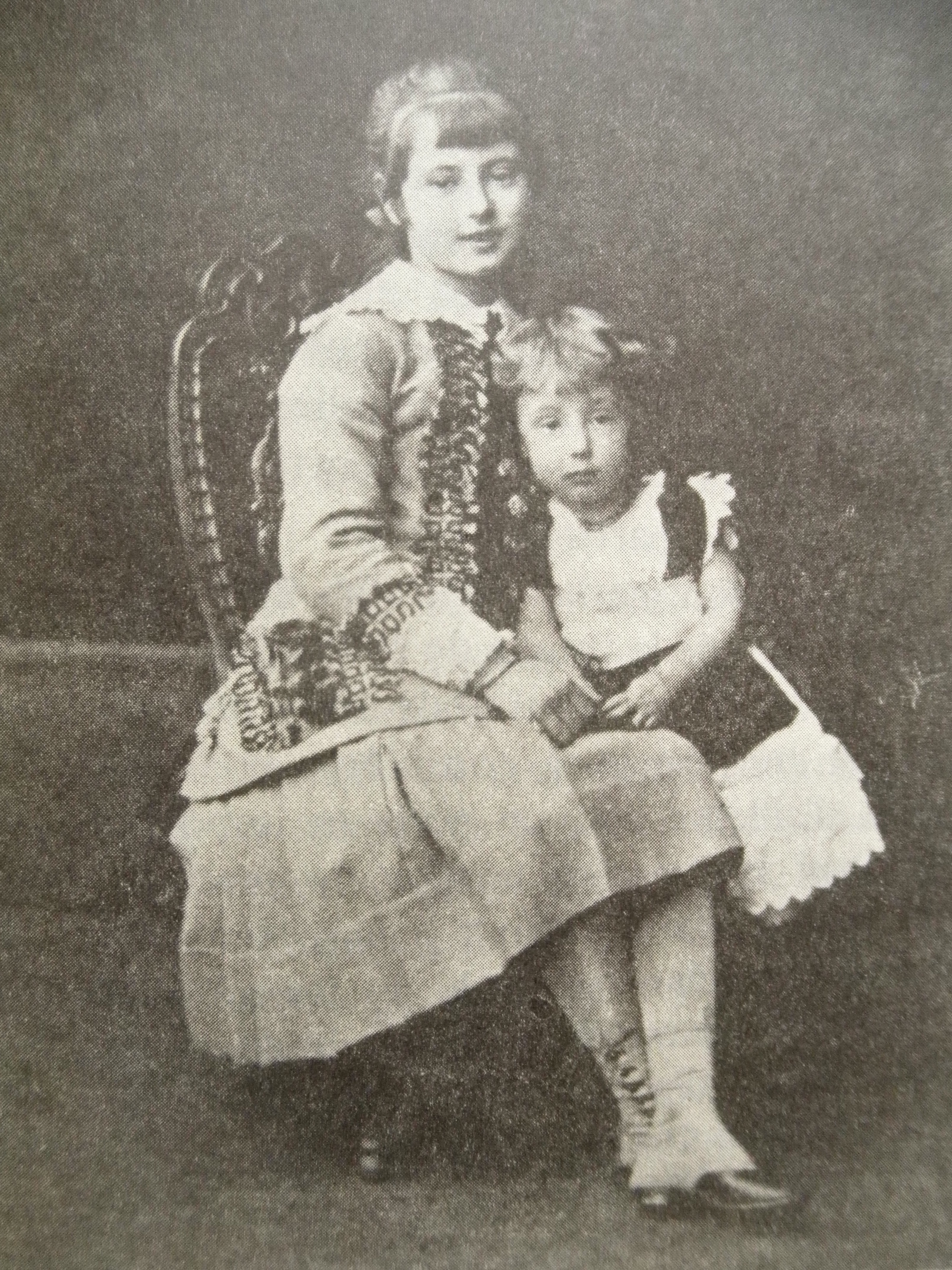
Minnie and her sister Betti David.

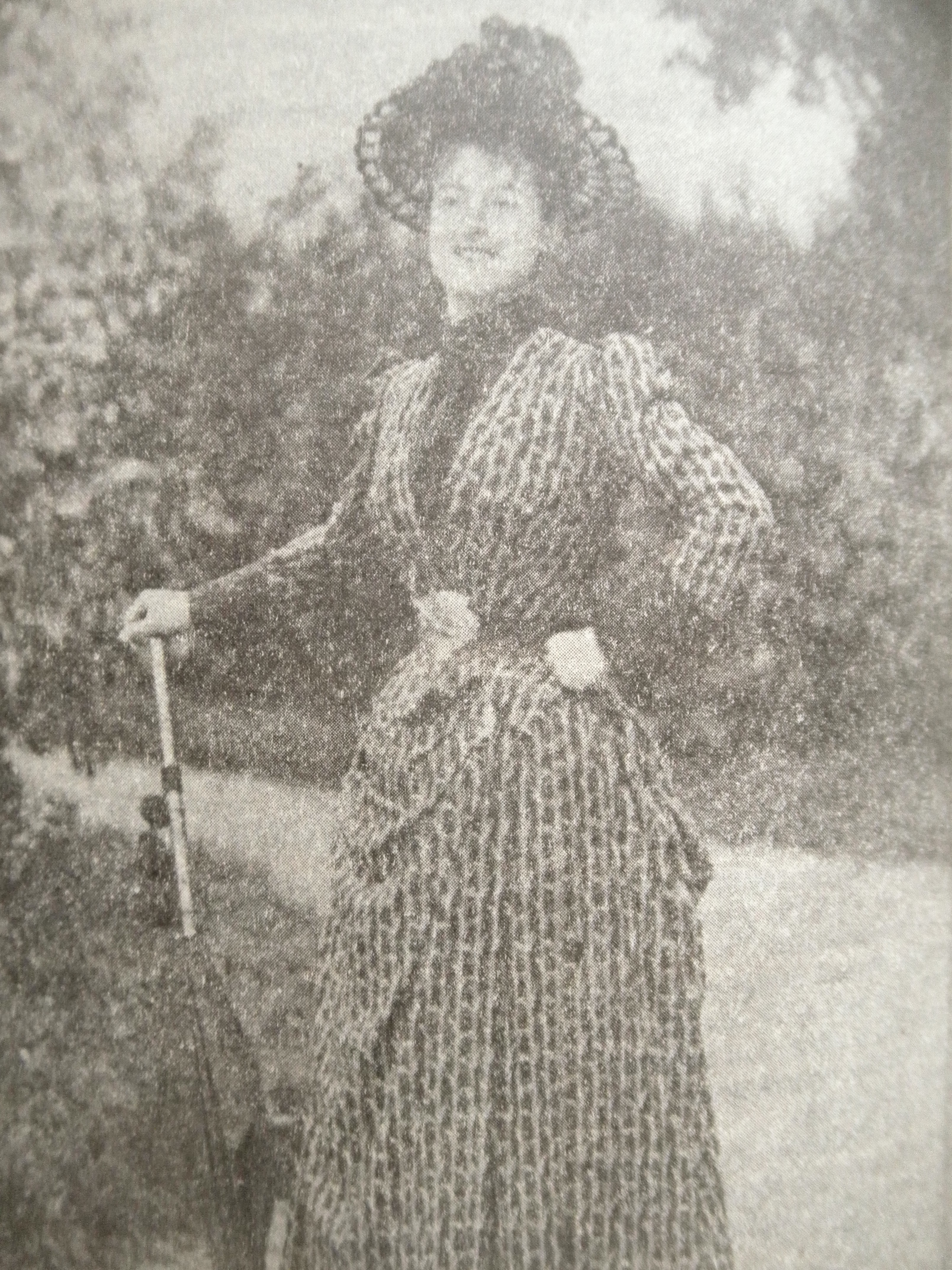
Minnie Bourget in 1890.

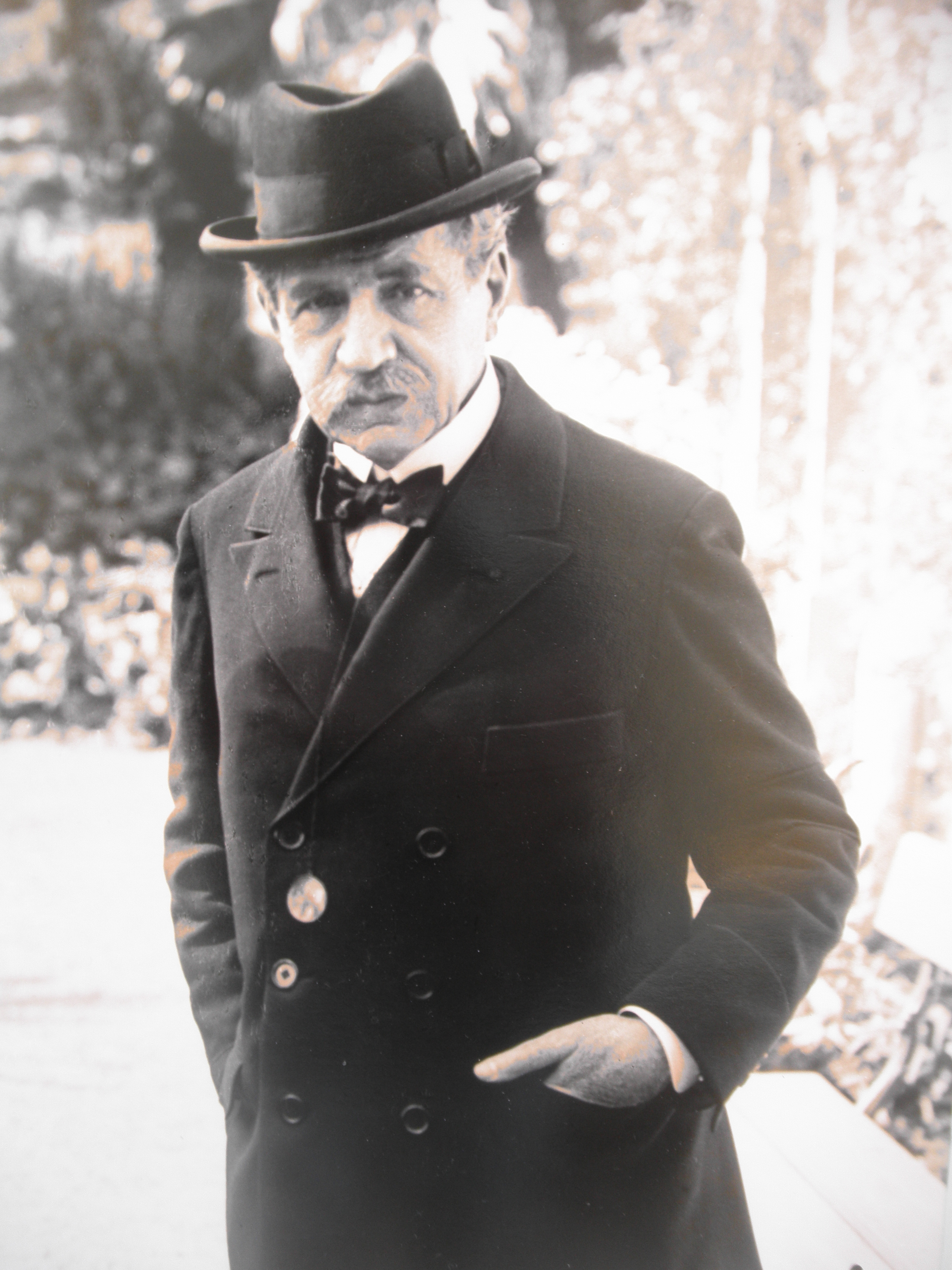
Paul Bourget at Le Plantier around 1920.

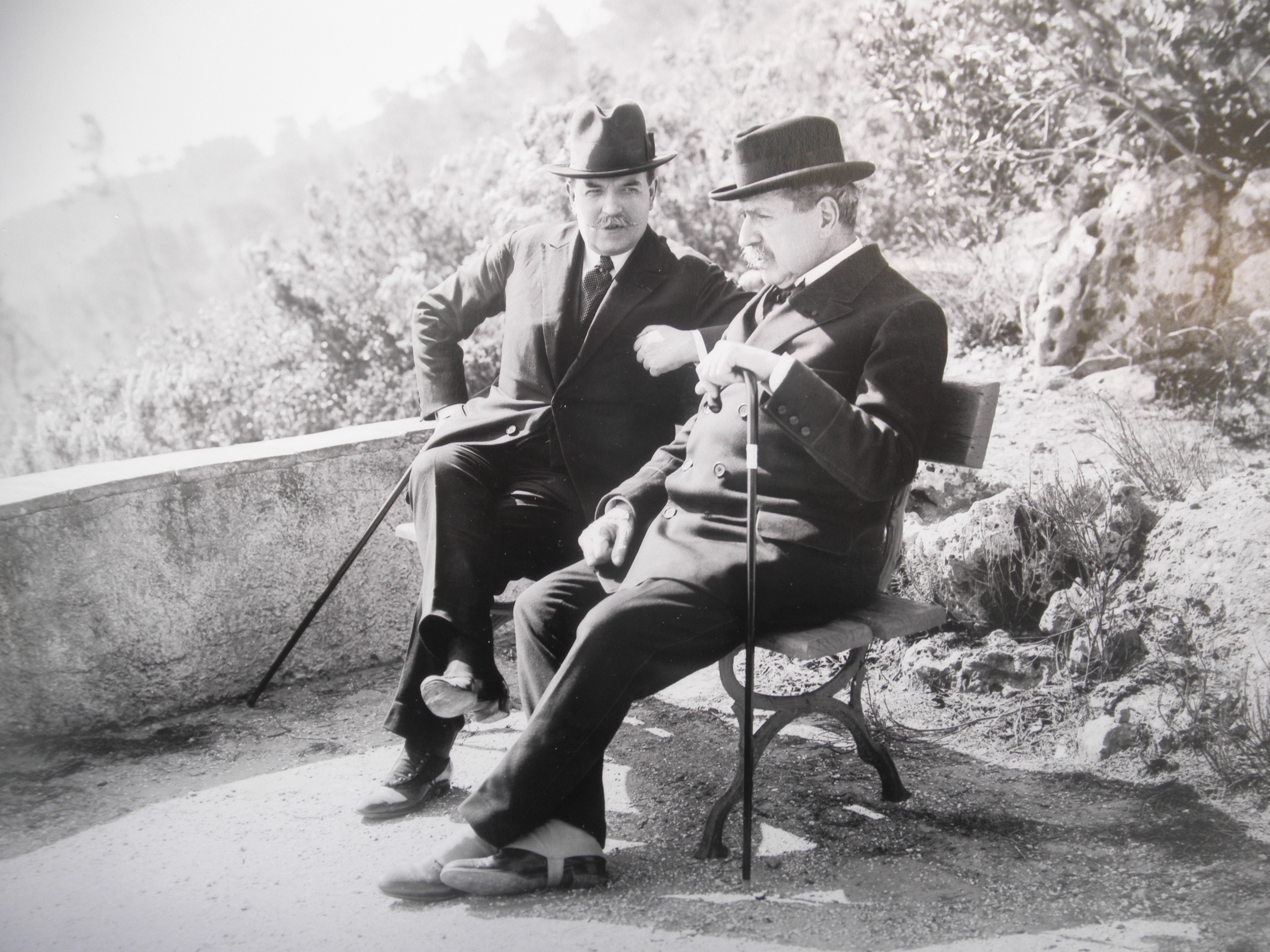
P. Bourget and H. Bordeaux at Le Plantier.

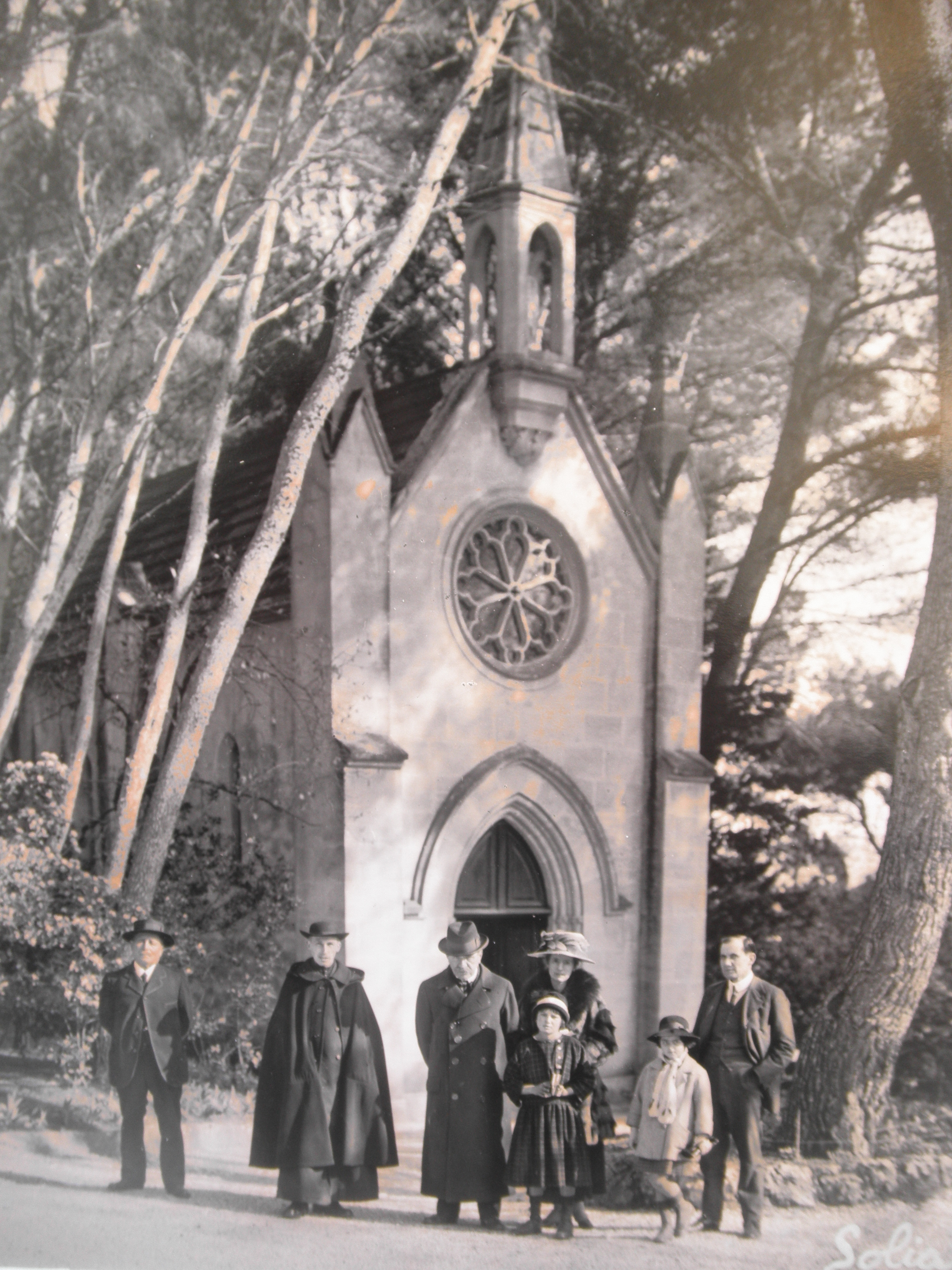
Paul and Minnie Bourget in front of the chapel.

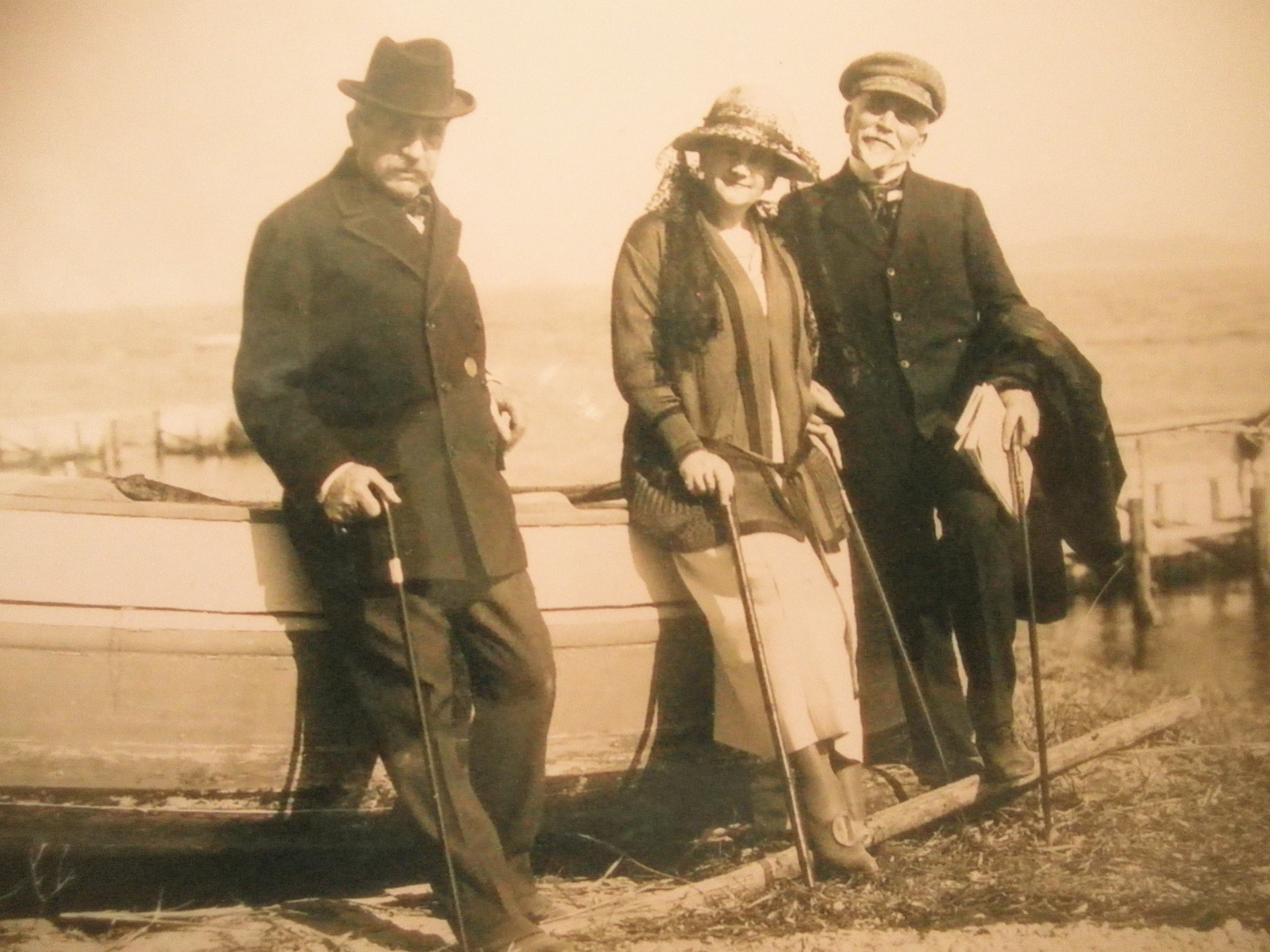
Paul Bourget, Edith Wharton, and Joseph Conrad. (Note: Photograph taken in 1923 in the small port of La Madrague, a cove on the Giens peninsula.)

=== Descendants of Paul Bourget, contemporary period of Le Plantier ===
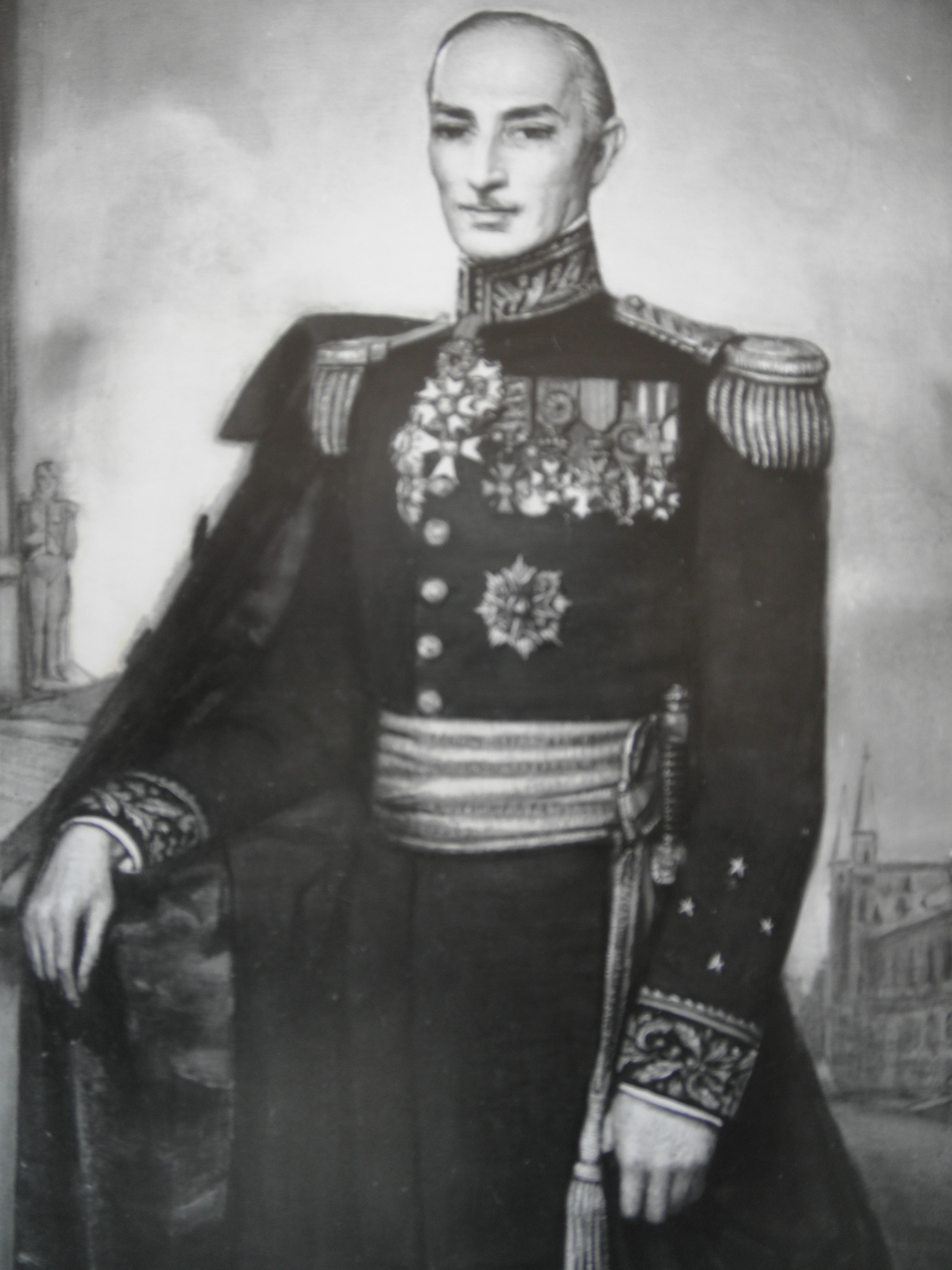
Marius Daille by Federico Beltrán Masses, circa 1916–1918.

The property of Le Plantier de Costebelle had been acquired by the marital community between Paul Bourget and Minnie David from Marie Catherine "Berthe" Husson de Prailly, widow of Mr. Alphonse Luc Maxime du Bouëxic, Count of Guichen, by deed recorded by Maître Patteson, notary in Hyères, on January 29, 1896. The purchase price was 75,000 francs, half of which was paid in cash, the rest payable within five years.

Minnie, who died on October 12, 1932, left Paul Bourget common in jointly acquired assets under the terms of their marriage contract recorded by Maître Hussenot-Desenonges on July 28, 1890. He became her universal heir (holograph will of Minnie Bourget dated December 21, 1927).

In 1935, Paul Bourget left no heirs with a legal share in his estate, as certified in a notarized statement drawn up by Maître Hussenot-Desenonges, notary in Paris, on January 10 and 14, 1936. However, in his holograph will and codicil dated January 25 and August 14, 1935, filed in the official records of the said notary on December 26, 1935, the man of letters named as his joint universal legatees: General Marius Daille (1878–1978), originally from Savoie (Chambéry, Les Mollettes), (Note: General Daille retired in the 1960s to Paul Bourget's house in Var. He is especially known for leading the 45th Army Corps (30,000 men) across the Swiss border in 1940 to escape the German invaders. He remarried in 1965 to Madame Bouillon, born Marie-Thérèse Metoz (1904–1982), a woman from Jura whom he had known in his youth, and with whom he is buried in the private chapel of the Plantier de Costebelle. His first wife, Germaine Persinette-Gautrez, Paul Bourget's niece, is buried in Clermont-Ferrand, probably in the Carmes cemetery, in the Gautrez family tomb. The general had no children from either marriage. He was a Grand Officer of the Legion of Honor. In May 1937 in Hyères, a committee was formed to erect a monument in honor of Paul Bourget, with active involvement from Marius Daille (municipal archives, Hyères, series 1 M 31). Members of this committee, aside from the general, included: Count de Beauregard, Viscount de Noailles, Marquis de Tholozan, Mrs. Fournier (then owner of Porquerolles Island), Mr. Gustave Roux, Mr. Georges Simenon (writer), Mr. Slizewick (Banque de Provence), Mr. Henry Bordeaux, Mr. Francis Carco, Mr. Claude Farrère (Académie française), and Mr. Gérard Bauër. France's entry into the war prevented the project from being completed. He dedicated his life to preserving the memory of Paul Bourget (donations to the Condé Museum, the Bibliothèque nationale de France, the Fels Library, the Chambéry Museum, and collaboration with writers like Professor Michel Mansuy who wished to write a monograph about Bourget). After WWII, he renovated the Plantier, which had suffered damage during the occupation: the German requisition on October 10, 1943, left the property severely degraded, with Bourget's archives scattered on the floor (municipal archives, Hyères, series 4 H 5). In October 1944, seals were placed to protect the furniture. The general also worked to restore the park, damaged by German trenches, bombings, and a fire in 1964 that devastated the eastern slope of Mont des Oiseaux. In 1952, he took part in the ceremony at Hyères city hall and the Plantier to celebrate Paul Bourget's centenary. Italian painting copies made by Camille for Paul Bourget were exhibited at 98 rue de Varenne, Paris, at the general's home. He only moved permanently to the Plantier upon retirement. Marius Daille had an older brother, Joseph Ambroise Daille (a teacher in Jacob-Bellecombette), father of two sons: Amédée, head of the tax office in Savoie and mayor of Chambéry in 1944, and Émile-Louis, who died at the Dardanelles in 1918. Émile-Louis, husband of Clotilde Anriot (daughter of Jules Anriot, Édouard Herriot's secretary), had a son, Gérard Daille (the future admiral), whom Marius Daille, without direct heirs, considered as his successor.) and his wife, Madame Daille, born Marie "Germaine" Eugénie Persinette-Gautrez (1886–1959), niece of Paul Bourget. (Note: Germaine Gautrez was born in Clermont-Ferrand (Puy-de-Dôme) on October 2, 1886, and died in the same city on June 24, 1959. She was the daughter of Dr. Eugène Gautrez, a hygienist, and Claire Bourget, Paul Bourget's half-sister. In 1940, thirty years after marrying Marius Daille (in 1910), Germaine Daille's mental health deteriorated rapidly, and she was admitted to a psychiatric hospital in Clermont-Ferrand run by nuns, where she remained until her death. She named her husband as universal heir in a holographic will dated April 10, 1945, legally recorded by Maître Gramain, notary in Clermont-Ferrand, on October 30, 1959. The general received the inheritance by order of the President of the Tribunal de Grande Instance of the Seine on December 19, 1959. The transfer of this inheritance was certified by a notarized deed drawn up by Me Hussenot-Desenonges on February 11, 1960. No children were born of their union.)

Germaine Daille-Gautrez, niece of writer Paul Bourget

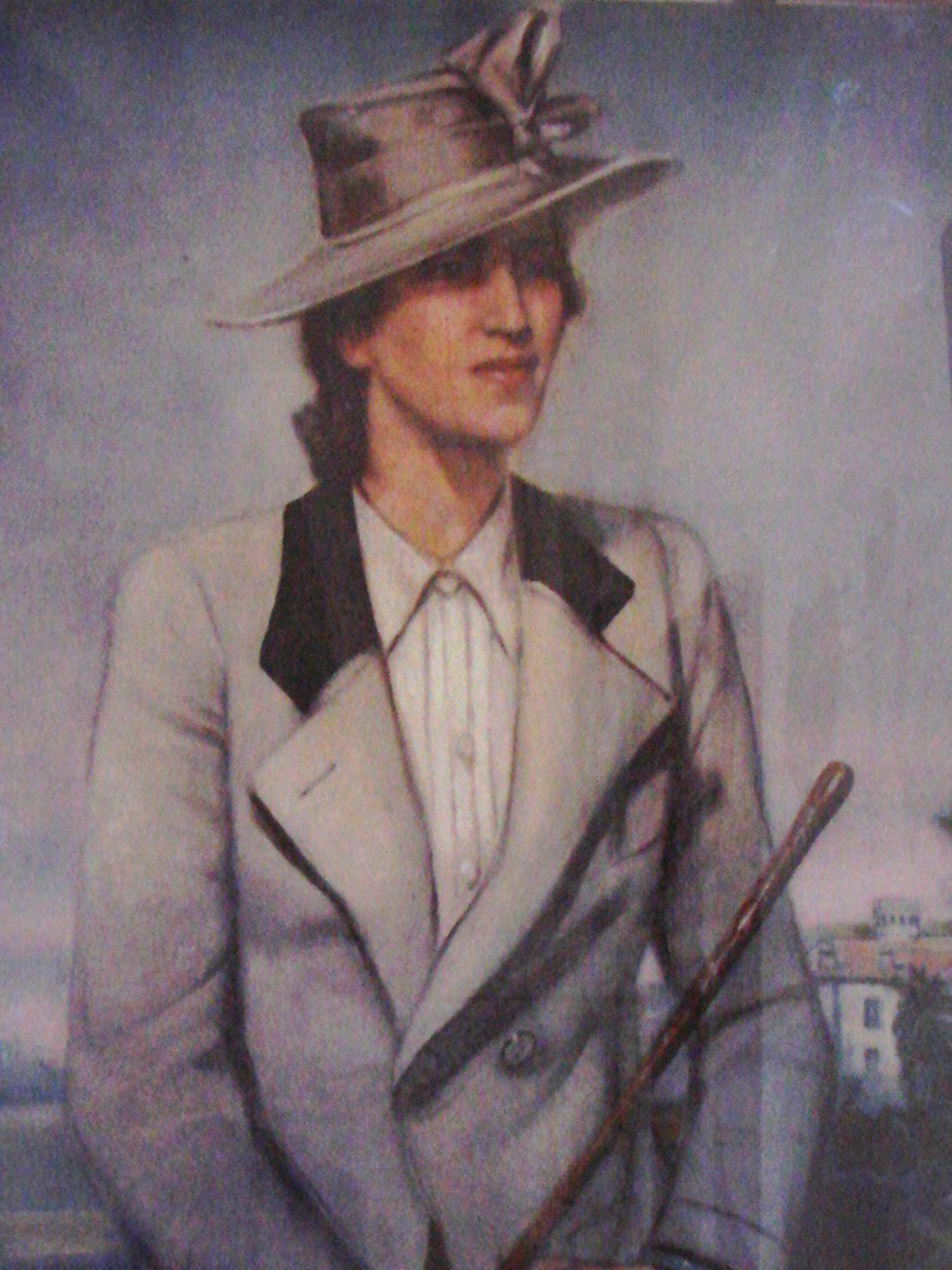
Germaine Gautrez by Federico Beltrán Masses, circa 1916-1918. Le Plantier can be seen on the right of the painting.

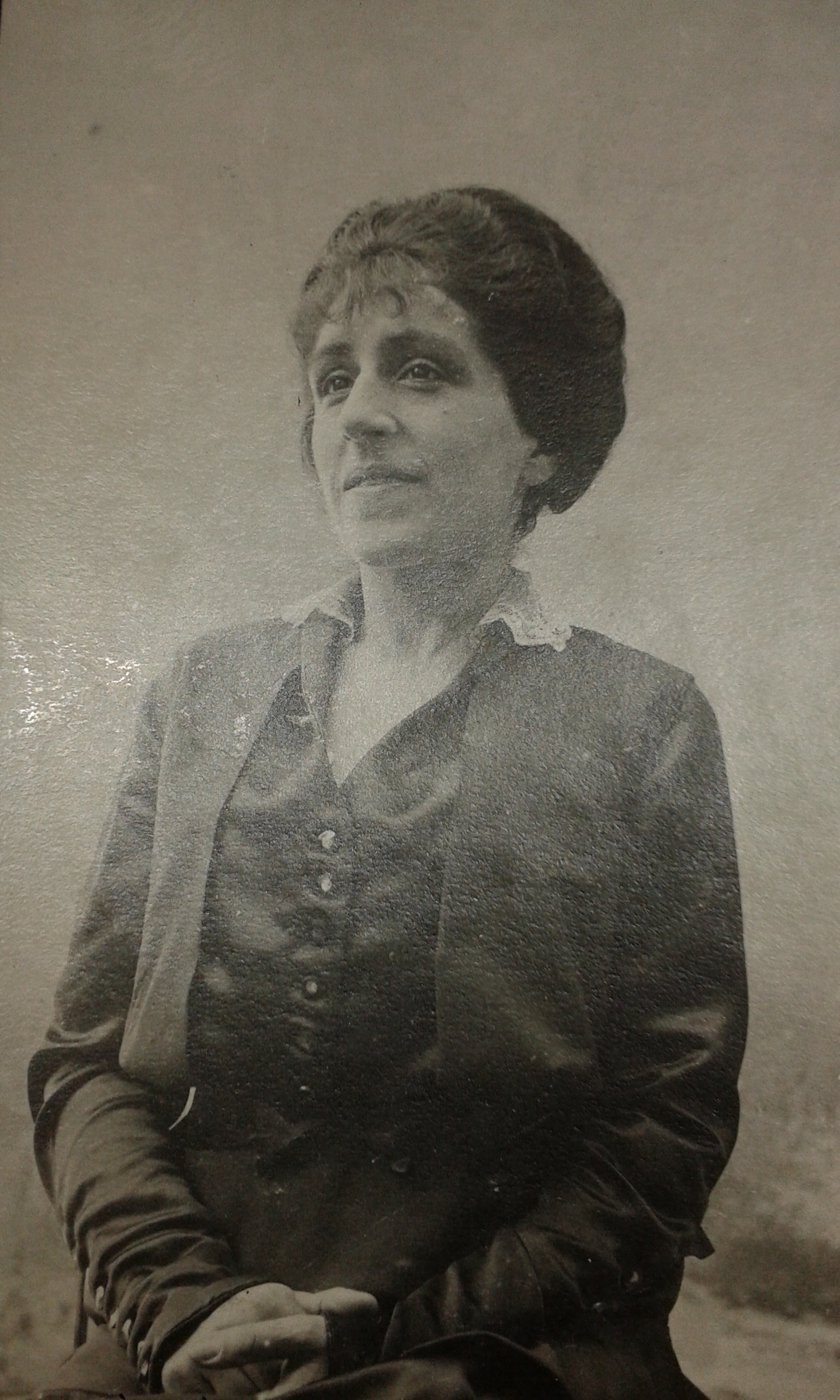
1926.

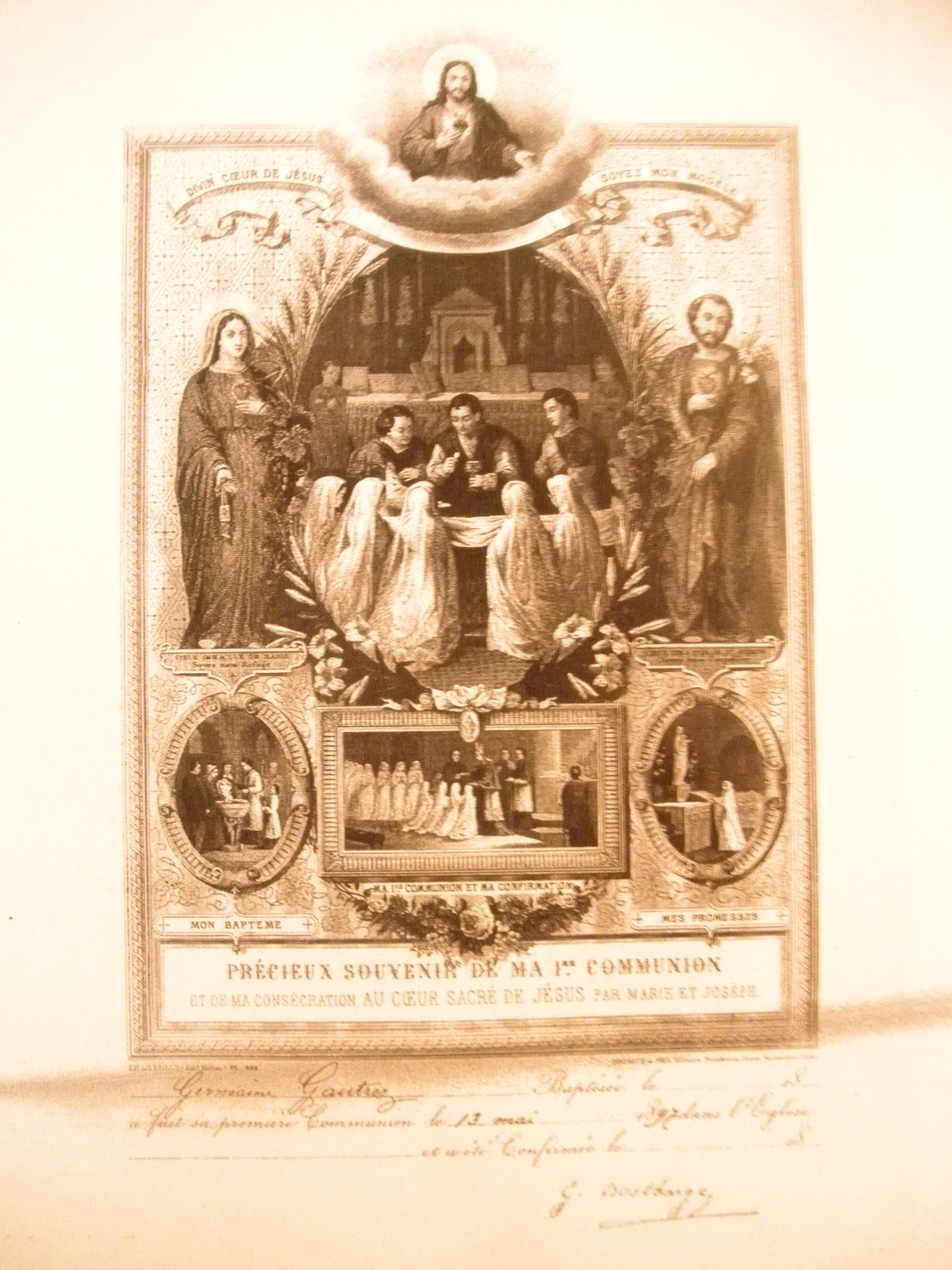
Communion 1897

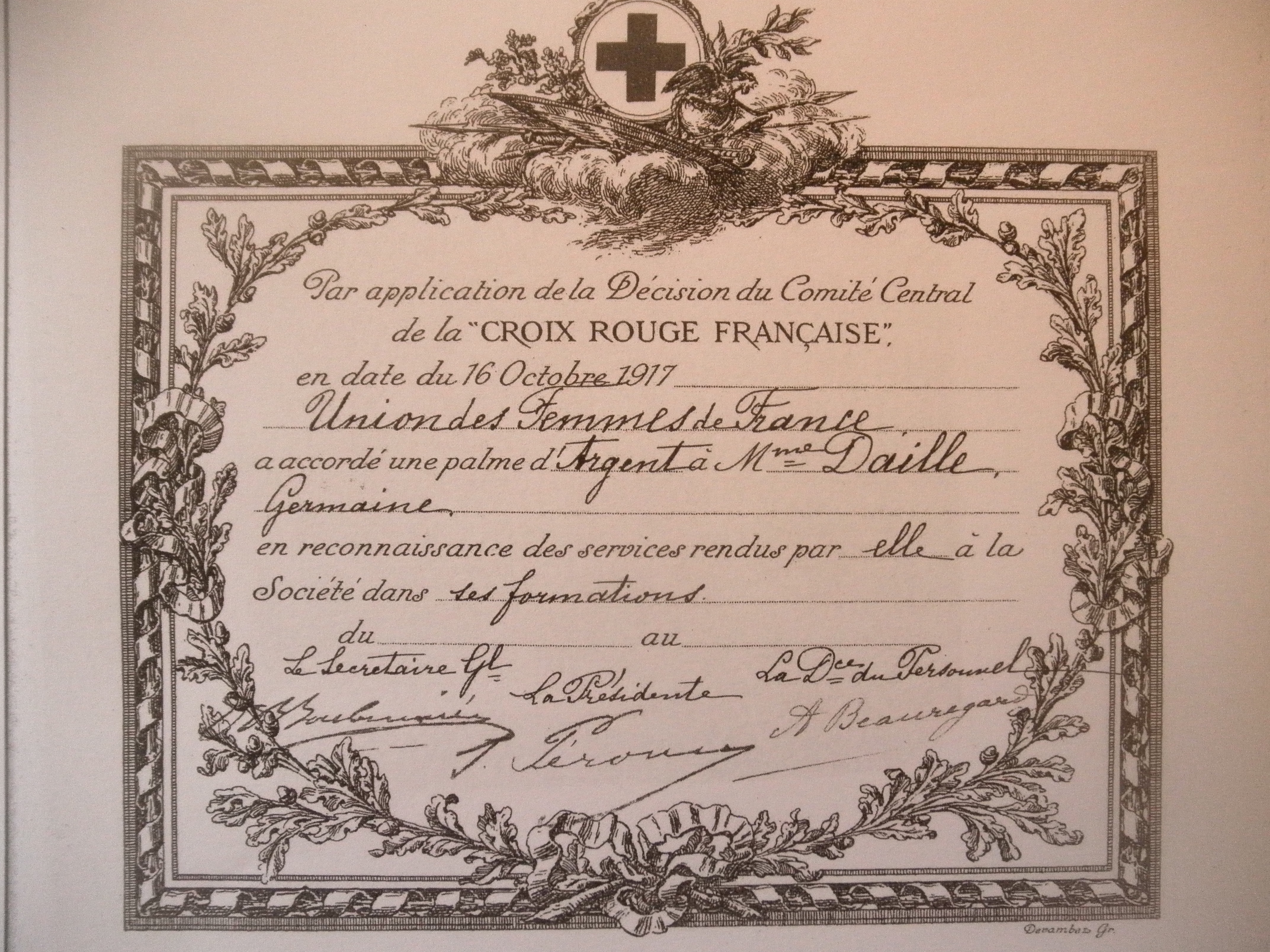
Silver Palm 1917

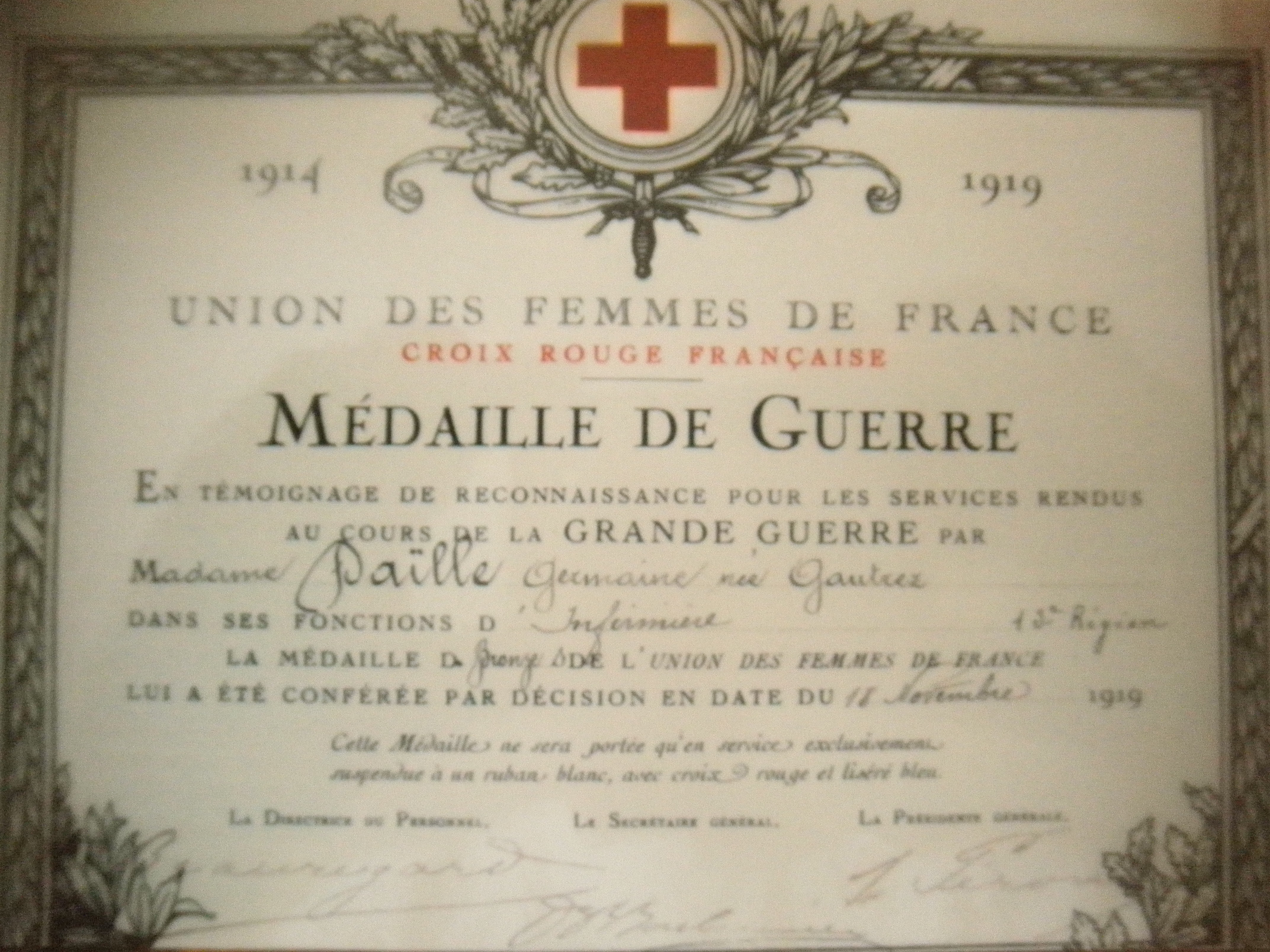
War Medal 1919

==== General Marius Daille ====
===== Requisition of Le Plantier during the Second World War =====
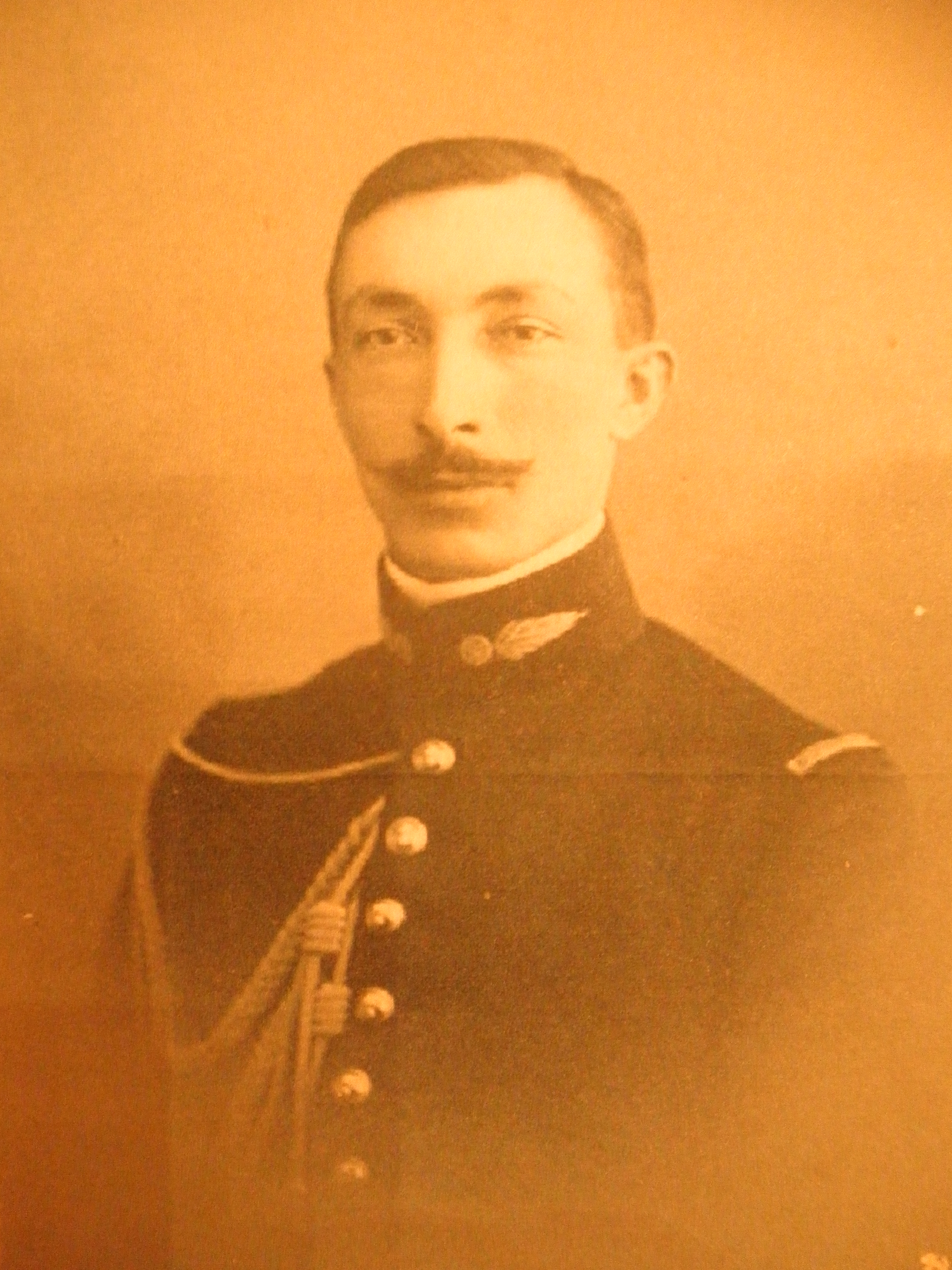
Marius Daille in 1900, Saint-Cyr class of Marchand.

From the beginning of hostilities, the local authorities were concerned about the fate of Paul Bourget's property, as his nephew, General Daille, was then commanding the 45th Army Corps far from the Var coast. The prefect proposed to exempt the home of the illustrious writer from all requisition and servitudes. However, on October 10, 1943, the villa was requisitioned. As a precaution, the writer's archives and library were moved nearby to the villa La Coualo, (Note: Today Villa La Pinedo, 220 boulevard Général-Koenig, Costebelle.) at the home of Colonel Beaugier. The harsh fighting in Hyères that followed the Allied landing in Provence on the Maures coast in August 1944 did not spare the property, which was ransacked by scavengers following the liberating troops.

===== Centenary ceremony of Paul Bourget's birth in 1952 =====
On September 28, 1952, General Marius Daille, nephew by marriage and heir of the academician Paul Bourget, gathered the writer's friends at the Plantier de Costebelle to celebrate the centenary of his birth and to affix two commemorative plaques at this site that had inspired the novelist. Several locations in Hyères, near the Plantier de Costebelle, served as settings for four of his novels: Lazarine (1917), Laurence Albani (1919), Le Danseur Mondain (1926), and part of the novel Le Fantôme (1901). In addition, Le Roman des Quatre (1923), written in collaboration with Henri Duvernois, Pierre Benoit, and Gérard d'Houville, takes place in Hyères, more precisely in Giens. Several short stories are also set in the surroundings of the Plantier de Costebelle: Voyageuses, Les Pas dans les pas, L'Eau Profonde, and Le Justicier. The ceremony was presided over by Gérard Bauër, Secretary General of the Académie Goncourt, and Mayor Joseph Clotis. It was followed by a photography exhibition in the Park Hotel's function hall.

General Daille keeps Paul Bourget's furniture and memorabilia at Le Plantier de Costebelle.

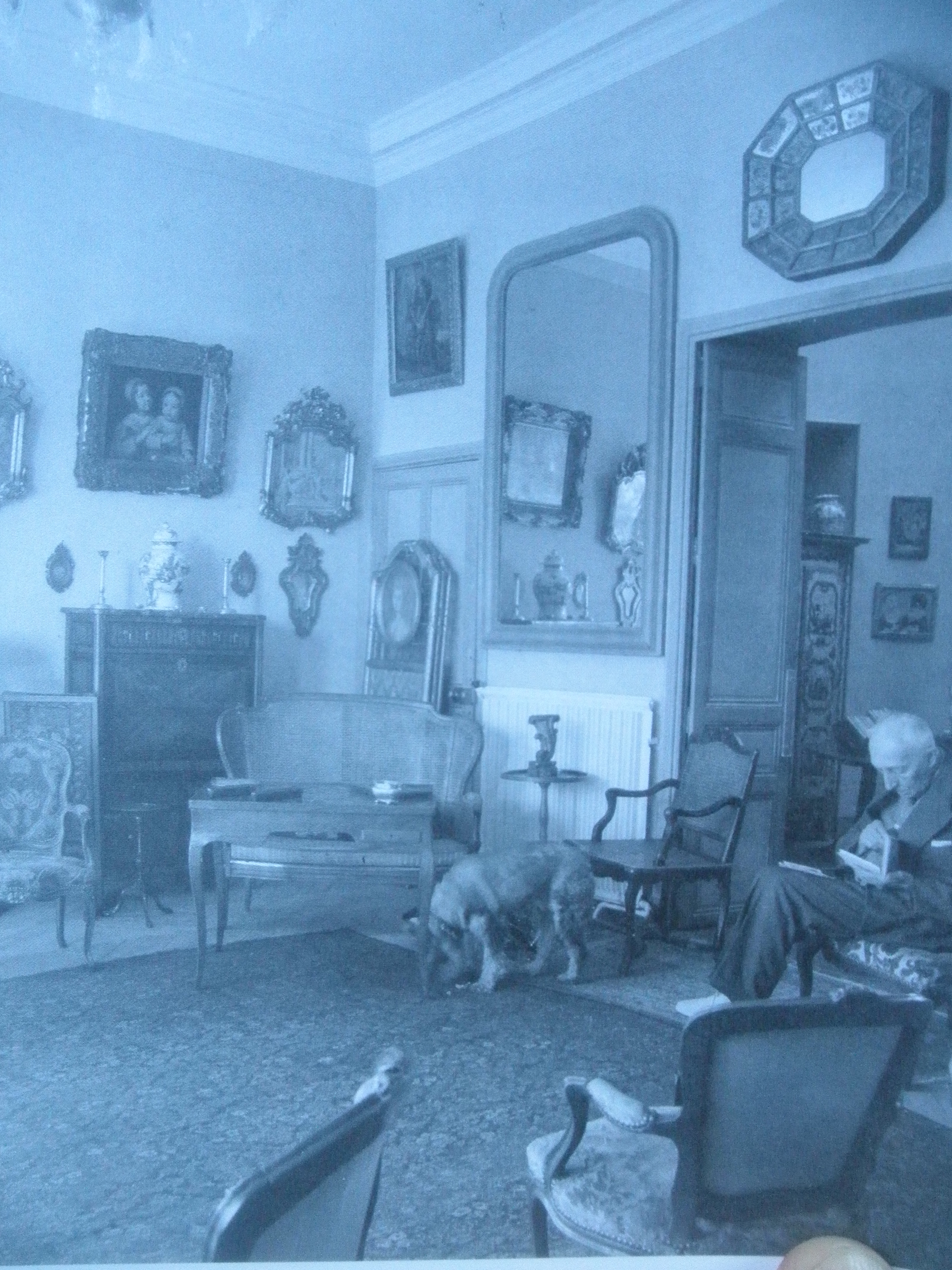
Interior of Le Plantier with objects and paintings belonging to the novelist.

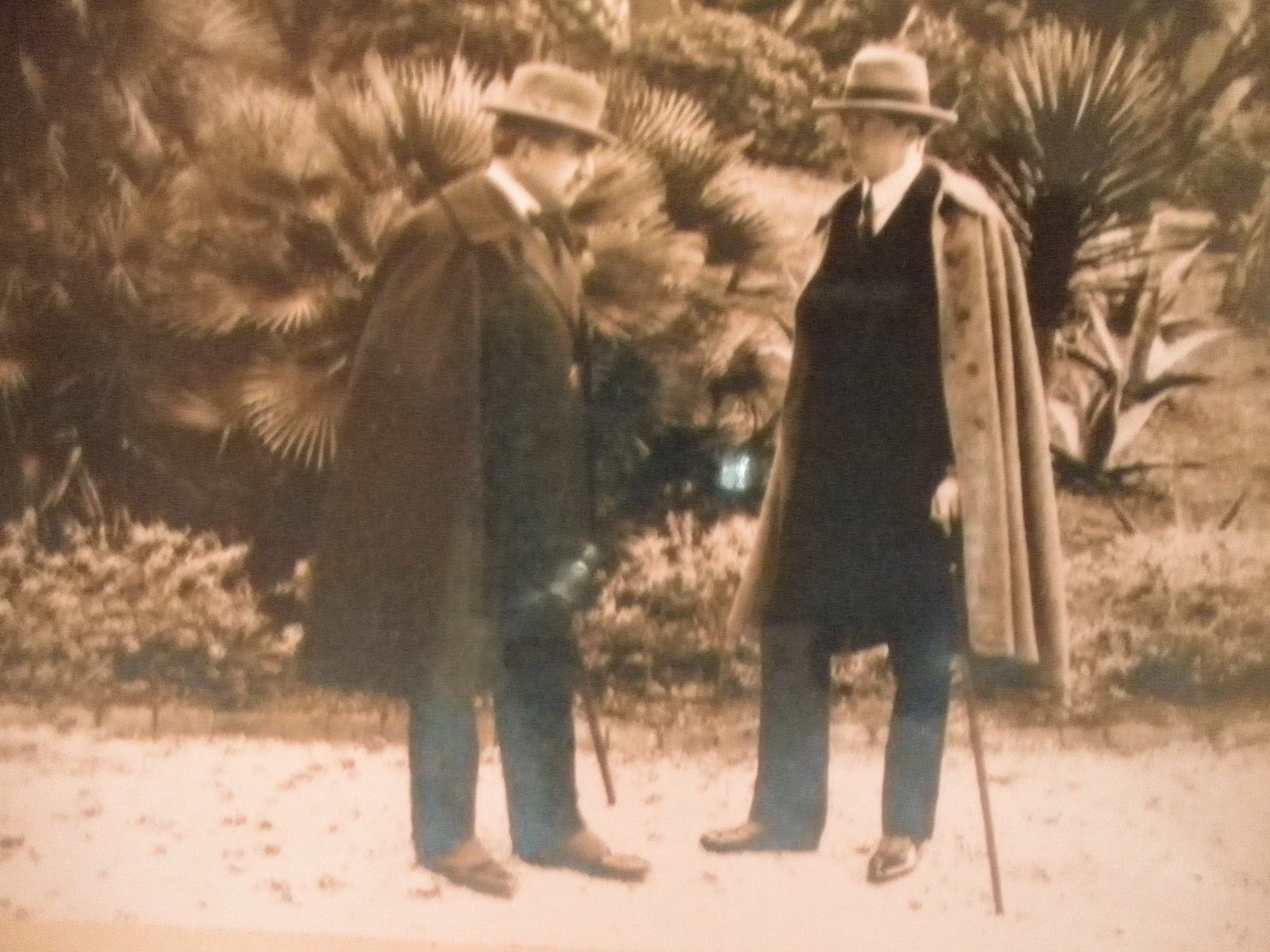
Gérard Bauër meets Paul Bourget at Le Plantier and befriends General Daille (circa 1919).

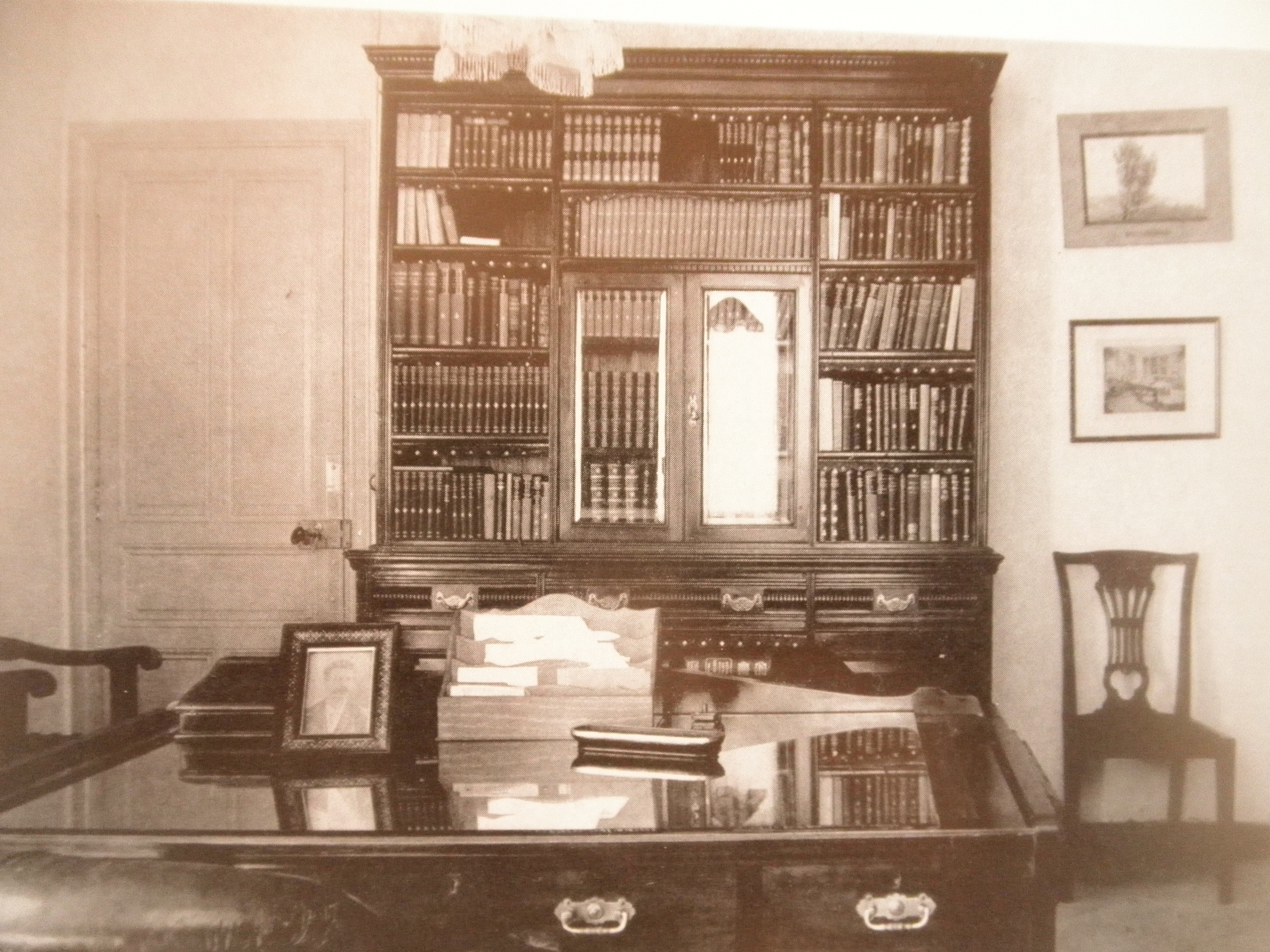
Paul Bourget's office at Le Plantier de Costebelle with a photo of Guy de Maupassant, circa 1929.

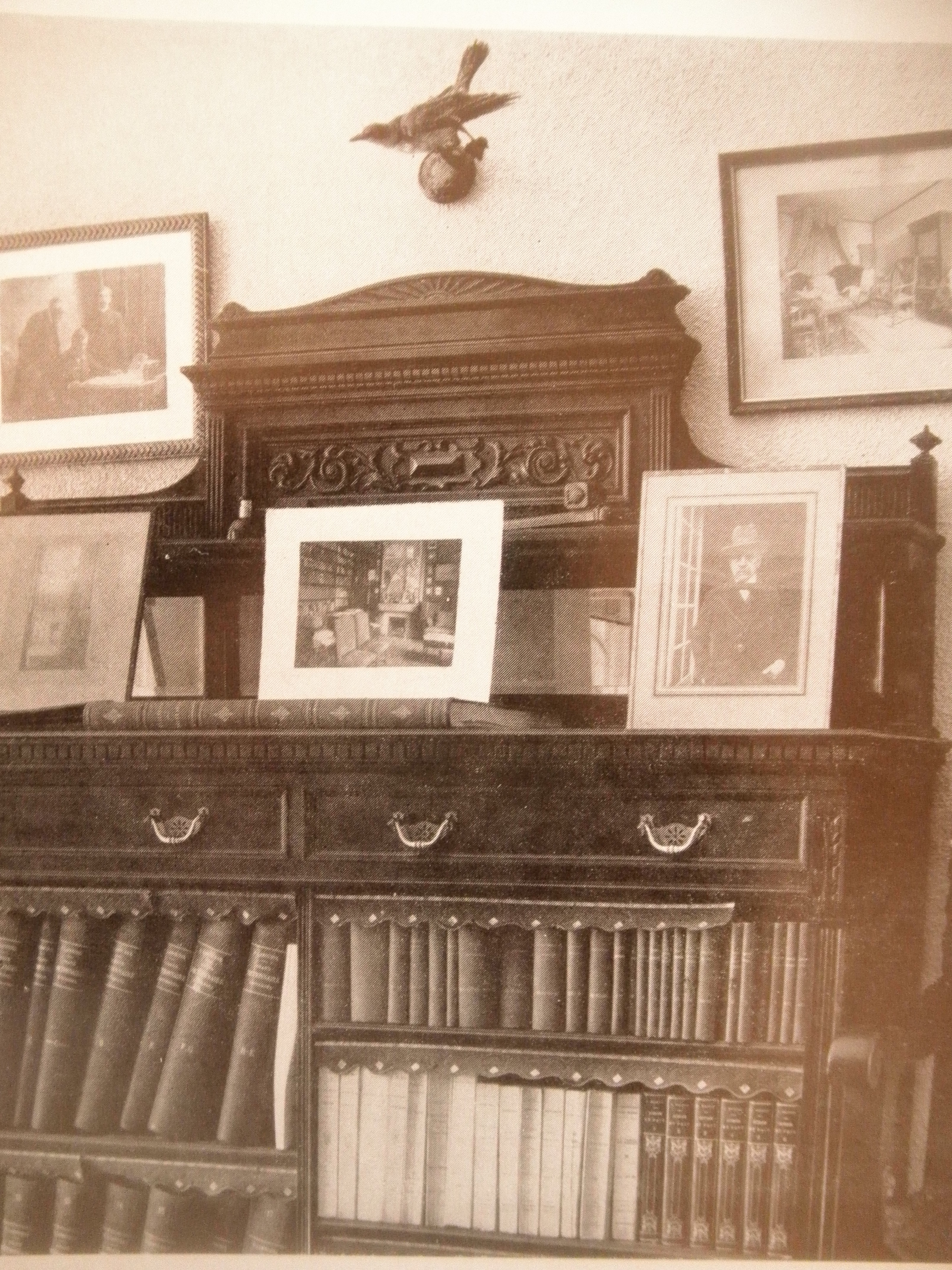
Library at Le Plantier with photographs of the Bourgets' bedroom and office in Paris, 1927.

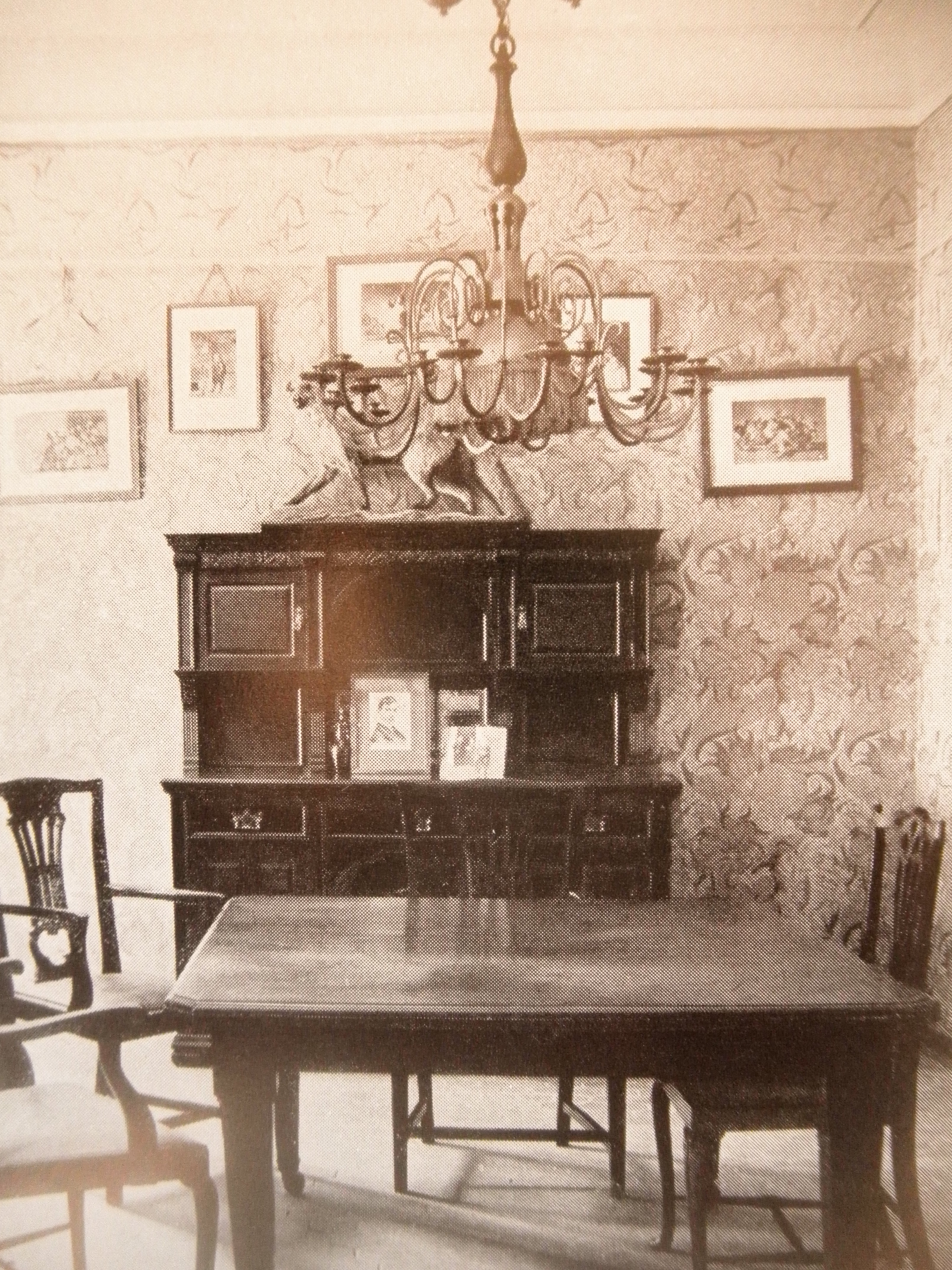
The dining room at Le Plantier de Costebelle, preserved in its original state by General Marius Daille, 1930.

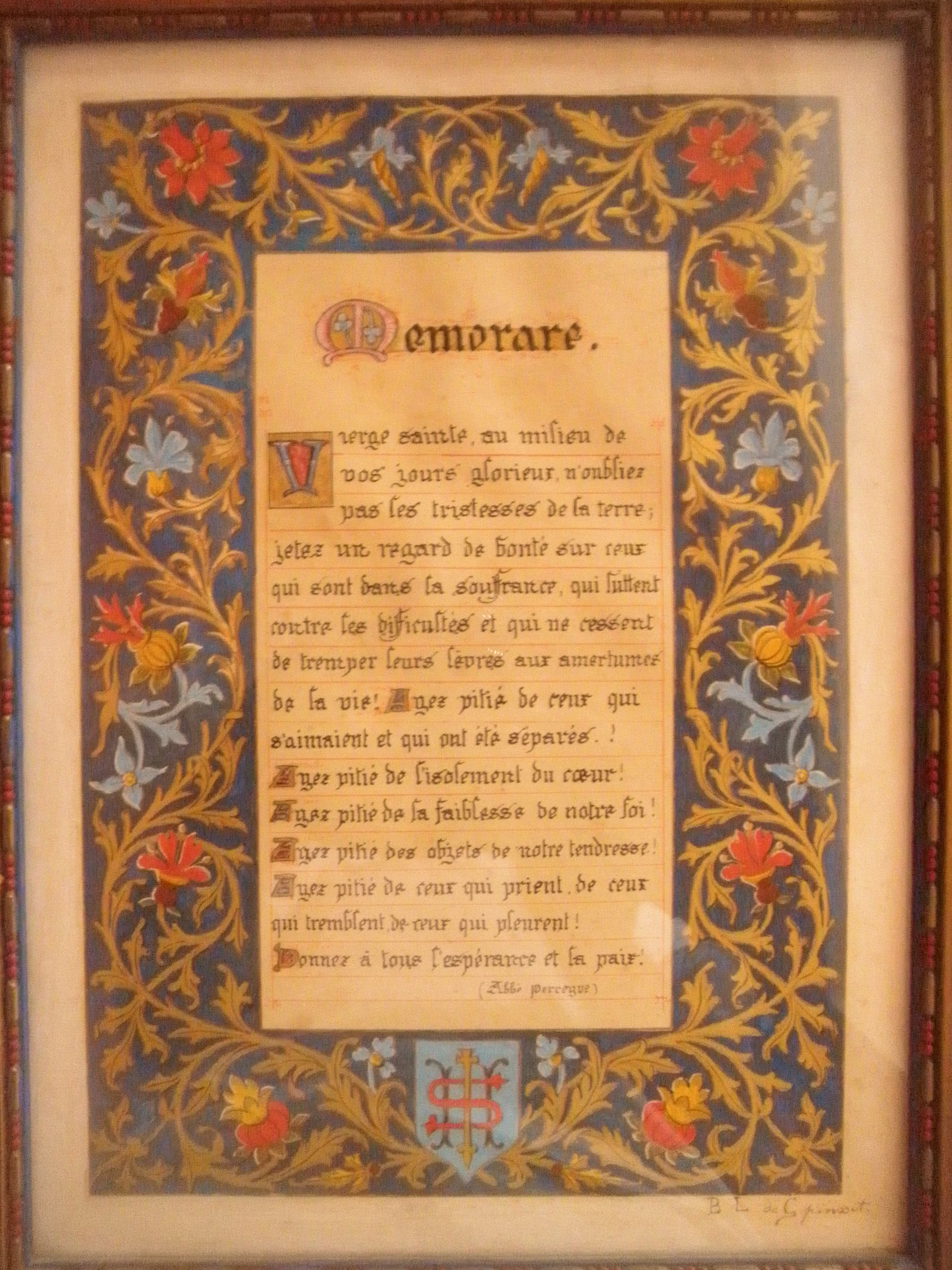
Illumination, a devotional work by Berthe de Prailly, preserved at Le Plantier de Costebelle by Mr. Daille, circa 1870, signed.

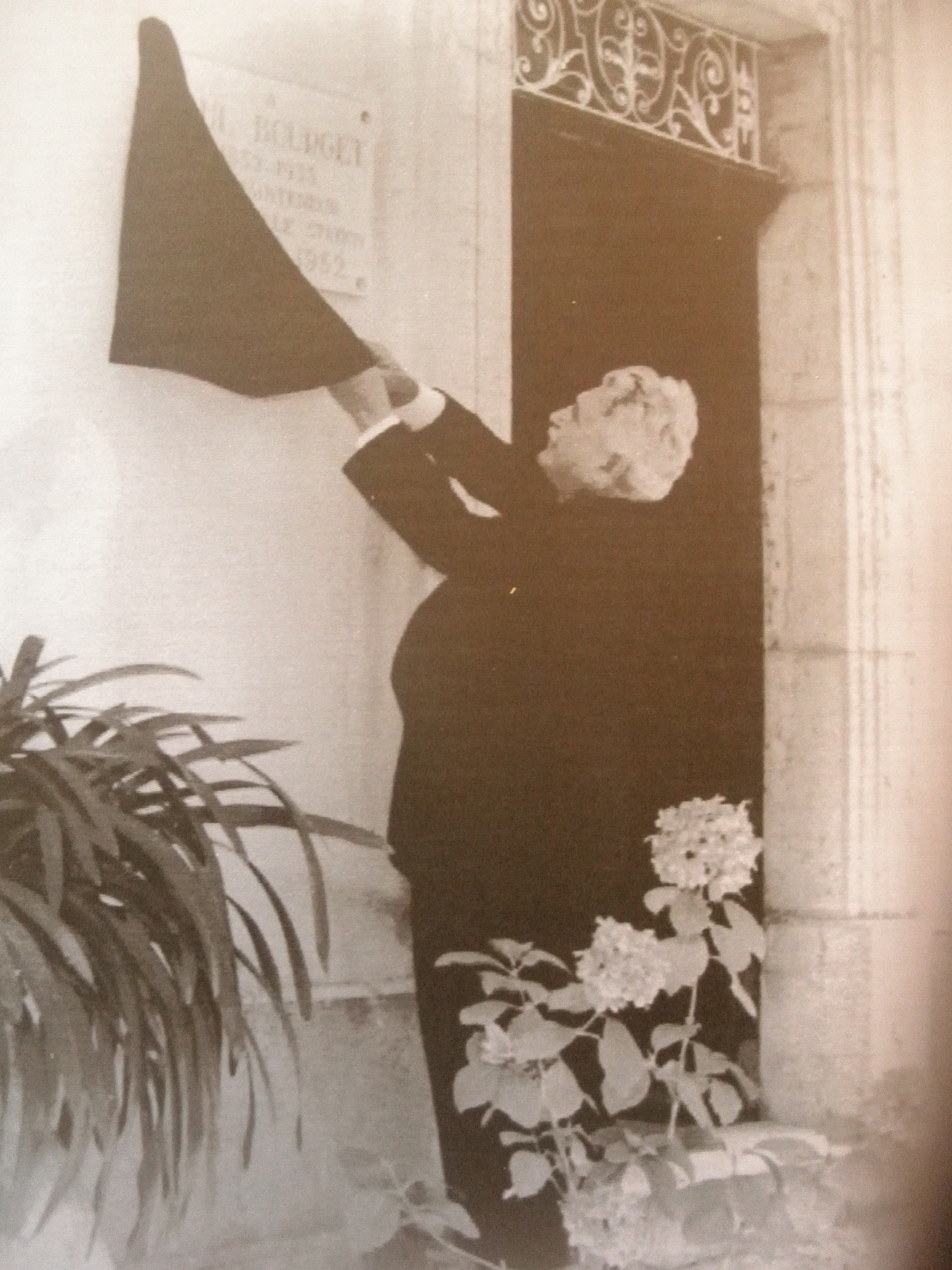
Joseph Clotis unveils the plaque commemorating the centenary of Paul Bourget's birth.

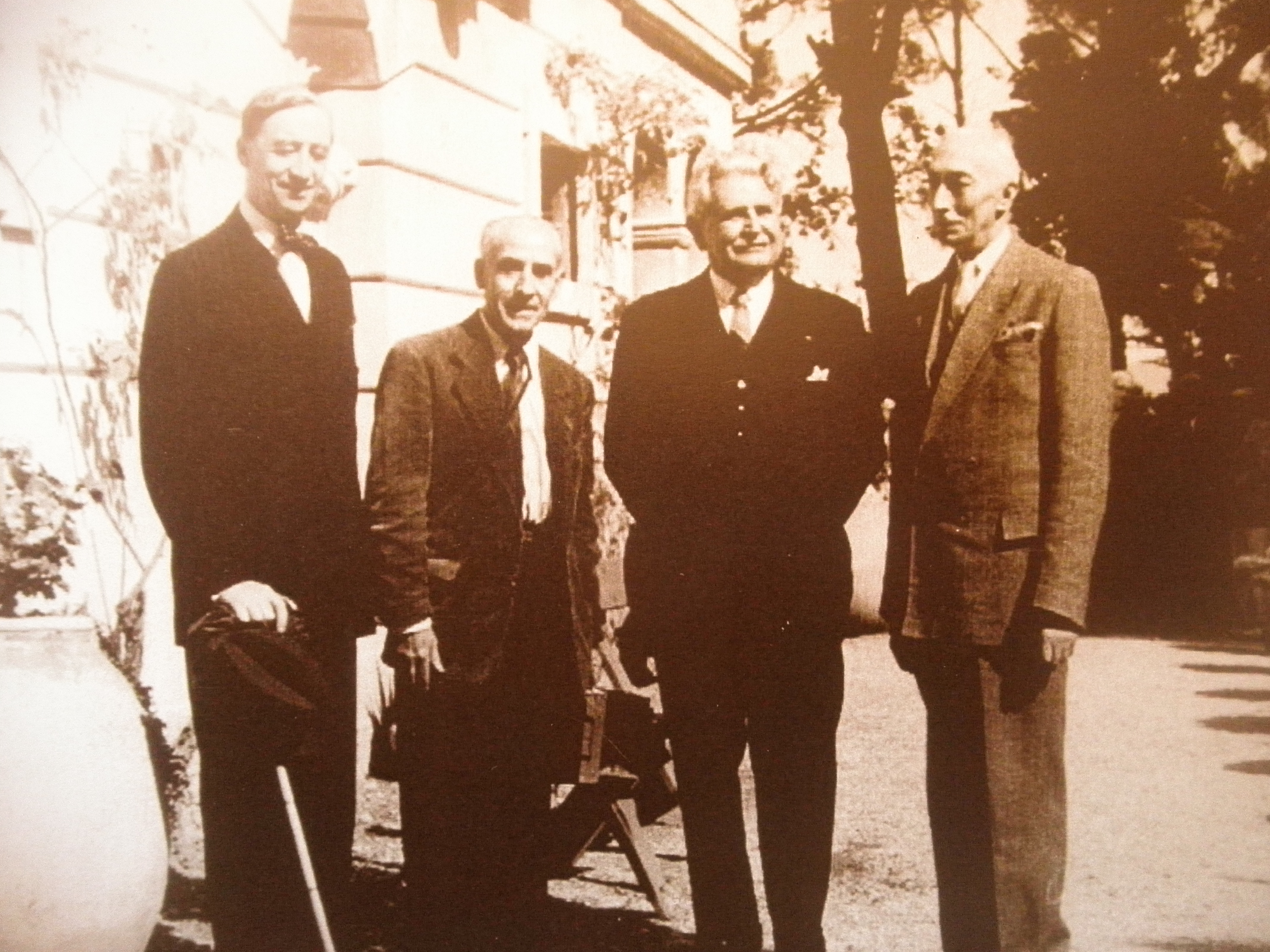
Gérard Bauër, Solia, Joseph Clotis, and Marius Daille in 1952 at Le Plantier for the centenary.

===== Donation of the novelist's paintings to the Chambéry Museum in 1980 =====
As the heir to Paul Bourget's estate and without descendants, General Marius Daille, who had lived full-time at the Plantier de Costebelle since the early 1960s, contacted the mayor of Chambéry (his family roots were in Savoy), Pierre Dumas, in 1972 to consider a potential donation of his collection of Sienese primitive paintings displayed in his Var residence. This collection notably included the polyptych of the Retable de La Trinité by Bartolo di Fredi. In February 1973, Michel Laclotte, Chief Curator of the Paintings Department at the Louvre Museum, visited the Plantier de Costebelle to study this unique collection. Under the guidance of Jean Aubert, curator of the Chambéry Museum, negotiations moved from a simple donation with usufruct to a payment-in-kind (dation) arrangement with the works placed on deposit at the Chambéry museum.

Emmanuel de Margerie, Director of the Museums of France, also visited the Plantier de Costebelle on December 30, 1975, to examine the collection and consider submitting certain pieces to the Interministerial Approval Commission.

The general involved his grand-nephew and heir, Admiral Gérard Daille, in these negotiations. After Marius Daille's death in 1978, Gérard took over the process. On November 14, 1980, the dation decree was signed, and four works from the Sienese school from Paul Bourget's collection entered the Louvre's paintings department to be deposited at the Fine Arts Museum of Chambéry.

The four paintings involved in the payment in kind
Name		Photograph	Date	Painter	Dimensions	Materials, technique	Inventory number
1	Retable de la Trinité (Altarpiece of the Trinity)		1397	Bartolo di Fredi (1330–1410)	H.160 L.288	Set of four panels, tempera on wood	RF 1980-200
2	Fuite en Égypte (Flight into Egypt)		16th century	Beccafumi (1486–1551)	H.64 L.53	Oil on wood	RF 1980-206
3	Sybille ou Vestale (Sibyl or Vestal)		15th–16th century	Girolamo di Benvenuto (1470–1524)	H.96 L.52	Oil on wood	RF 1980-205
4	Vierge à l'Enfant entre deux Saints (Virgin and Child between Two Saints)		15th century	Neroccio di Landi (1447–1500)	H.58 L.43	Oil on wood	RF 1980-204

The arrival of the Sienese artworks from the Plantier de Costebelle into the national collections allowed for a full restoration of these panels between 1981 and 1987 by the restoration service of the General Inspection of Classified and Controlled Museums. One of the panels from La Trinité, which appeared to depict a sainted bishop, was heavily repainted, hiding its true identity: it was Saint Dominic.

==== Admiral Gérard Daille ====
Admiral Gérard Daille, a grand-nephew of General Daille, born February 6, 1916, in Chambéry and deceased January 6, 2000, in Arcachon, became the legal successor of his great-uncle Marius Daille. He lived at the Plantier between 1978 and 1996. (Note: The admiral had a very brilliant career (slightly overshadowed by the ramming of the Surcouf, on which he was embarked, by a Soviet tanker, the General Boucharov, in 1971. According to navigation rules, the Surcouf was at fault, the officer on duty was responsible, but the incident reflected back on the admiral; personal archives of the admiral relating to the writer and which he took with him on his missions disappeared in the shipwreck). In 1945, he was awarded the War Cross with vermeil star; he was promoted to Rear Admiral in 1964; he commanded the Clemenceau, and in 1969 he took command of the Atlantic Fleet. He was appointed to General de Gaulle's private military staff at the Presidency of the Republic from 1952 to 1960. In 1975, he received his fifth star as Inspector General of the Navy (the Surcouf episode cost him the post of Chief of Naval Staff). He was promoted to Grand Officer of the Legion of Honour, as Paul Bourget had been before him. He died in Arcachon in 2000 and was buried near Sarlat, in Bouzic, Dordogne.) In 1996, he sold the property, which was divided between two separate owners: on the one hand, the main house of the Plantier, the chapel, the botanical park, the gatehouse, and 3.8 hectares of land; on the other hand, the farm and stables (formerly Paul Bourget's guesthouse) with 1.2 hectares.

When the Plantier left the Bourget/Daille family in 1996, numerous archives were transferred to the Hyères museum: death masks and hand imprints, the academician's ceremonial outfit, a plaster bas-relief of Paul Bourget by Roussel, photographs, objects (including a hunting trophy from the Chantilly pack of Mgr the Duke of Chartres, 1897), and archives from the Gautrez family.

== Architecture of a Neo-Palladian villa ==
=== Exterior architecture ===
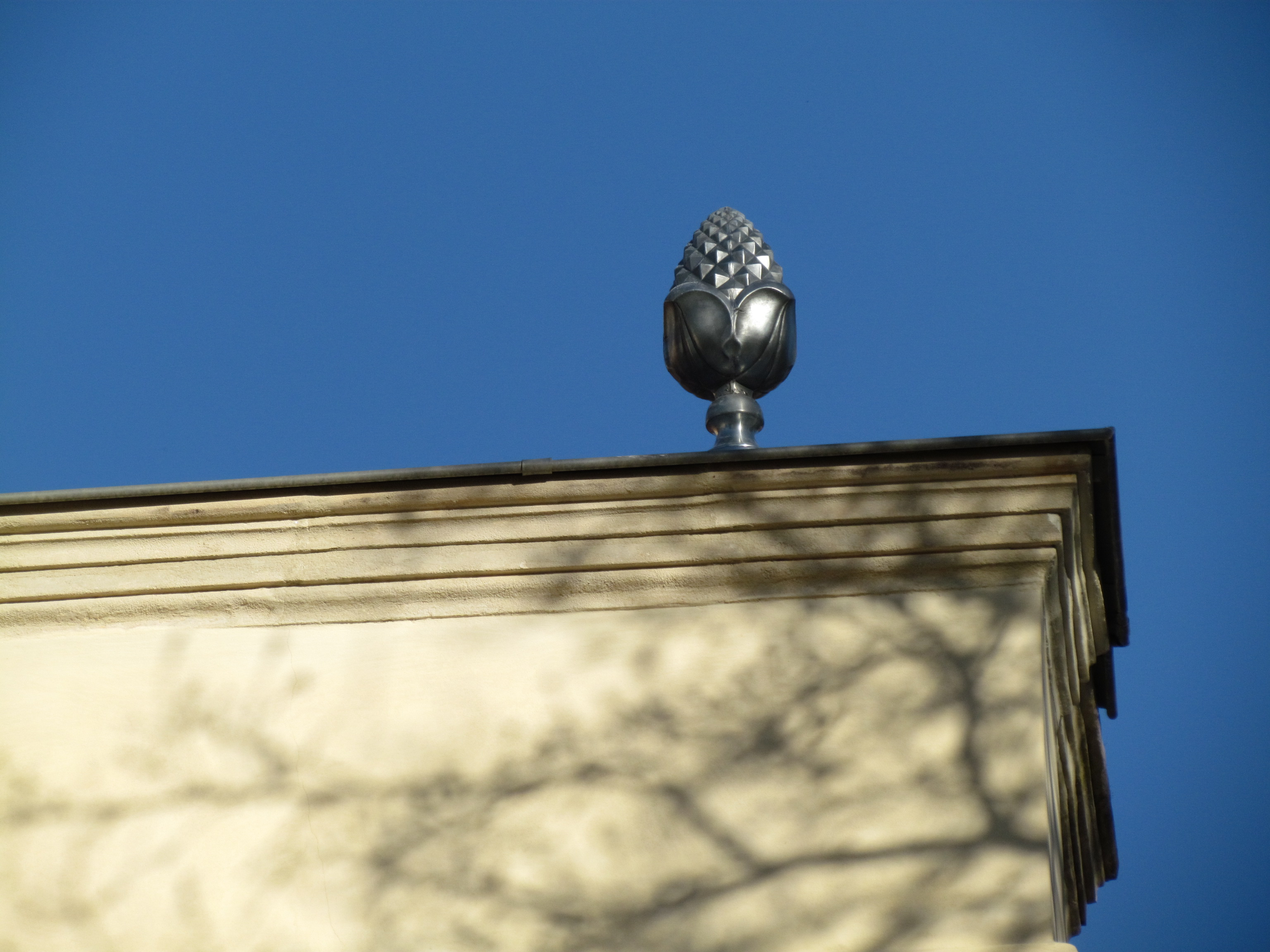
Zinc pinnacle spikes.

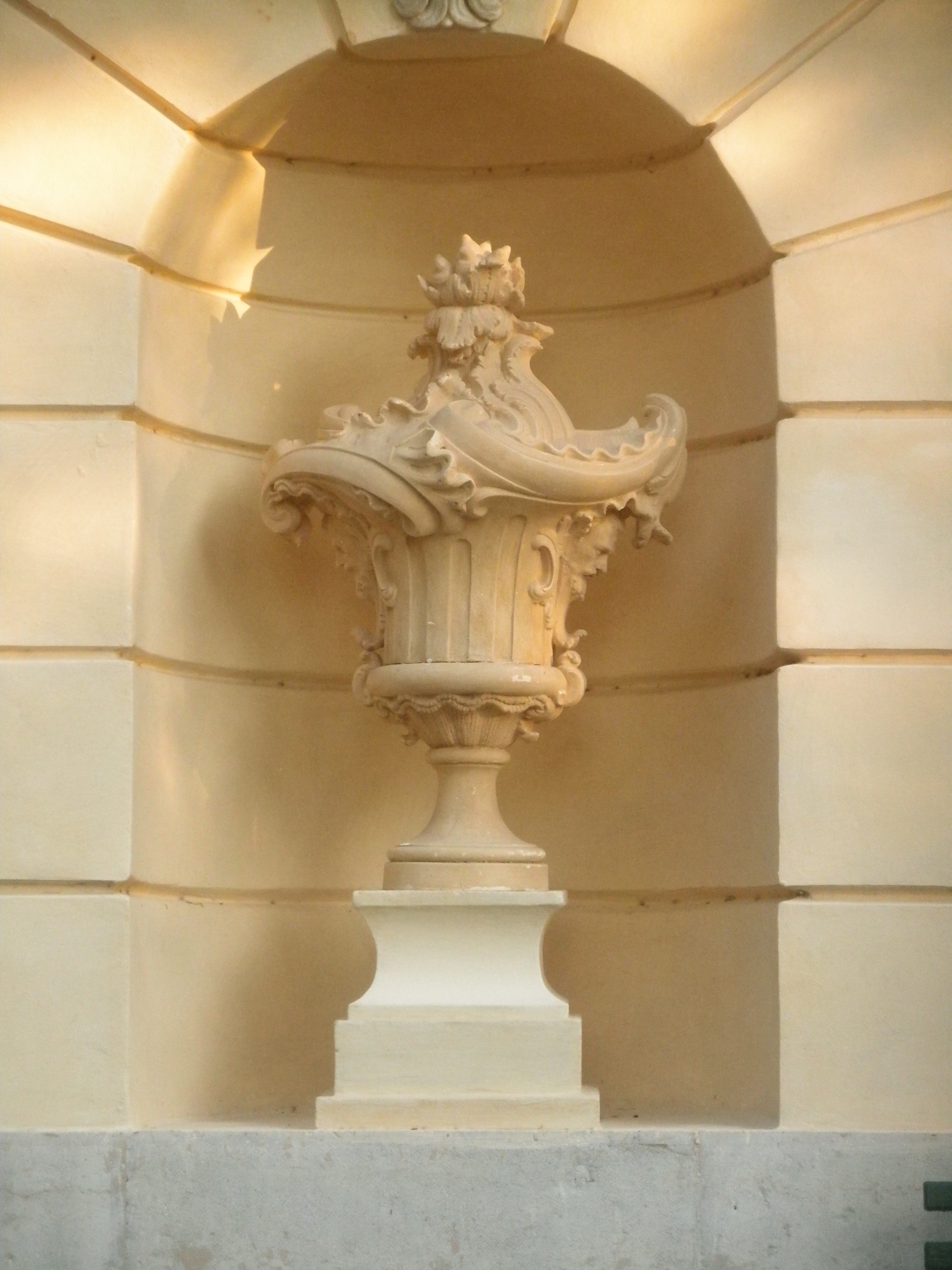
Fire pot on the main facade.

The house at the Plantier de Costebelle was built between 1859 and 1861 by Hyères architect Victor Trotobas (1807–1884). He had previously constructed a villa in the same Palladian style in the Orient district of Hyères—the Villa Venadou—which its owner intended for tourist rental. Unlike the Plantier de Costebelle, which qualifies as neo-Palladian, the Villa Venadou belongs more to the neo-Italianate style, with classical garlands and griffins, as Florence Goubert notes in her 1985–1986 Master's thesis in Art History. The Villa Venadou, owned by Mayor Alphonse Denis and completed in 1852, likely served as inspiration for the construction of the Plantier, which was registered in the land registry in 1861. The same plot also contains the Villa d'Orient and Chalet Obert. The Villa Venadou is smaller than the Plantier de Costebelle. The former cost 50,000 francs at the time, while the latter was built for 90,000 francs. The layout differs as well: the Villa Venadou is accessed via a staircase leading directly to the reception floor, whereas at the Plantier, the main entrance is at ground level.

Built of coated rubble stone on slightly sloped ground, the villa has a show façade featuring a pronounced projecting central section crowned with a triangular pediment, and pierced on the second floor by a Palladian window. (Note: It is regrettable that the facade restoration work on the main house in 2008 and 2009 put an end to the pinkish hue of the pigment, likely original (Wharton, Edith (1995). "Paris". Les Chemins parcourus [A Backward Glance]. Domaines étrangers (in French). Flammarion. p. 240. ISBN 2-264-03189-1.) covering all the facades.) On either side are two terraces supported by semicircular arcades that open onto loggias. On the first level, a solid wall is hollowed by a niche adorned with a finely sculpted urn, a "pot à feu." Decorative elements of the roofline, continuing its vertical and elegant line, include two zinc pinnacle finials shaped like pine cones flanking the pediment. The roof is topped with an inaccessible central tower decorated with latticework railings. The entrance façade, with its very simple door surround and window arrangement, recalls 18th-century farmhouses in the plains. The Plantier de Costebelle forgoes the southern façade stuccoes and main door moldings of the Villa Venadou, which are richly decorated with exotic lion heads, Roman fountain caryatids, and garlands.

The neo-Gothic style of the chapel is quite different from that of the house. The religious building is a complete and intact ensemble (including a statue of the Virgin, stained glass windows, and wrought ironwork), now a rare example of private 19th-century religious architecture. In the design of the façade, one notes liberties taken with medieval models, especially in the articulation of the lantern. It is likely that the villa's architect is not the same as that of the neo-Gothic building (whose identity remains unknown), given the stark difference in architectural styles. A chapel similar to the Plantier's—commissioned by Thérèse Pauline Lagotellerie, the Saint-Charles Borromée funerary chapel—was built between 1850 and 1852 (just five years before the Plantier chapel) in the nearby commune of La Garde, based on plans by Lyon architect B. Fontaine. The stained glass windows were made by master glassmaker Maréchal of Metz, and the sculptures by James Pradier.

The Villa Venadou, photographed by Gustave Eiffel in 1883, inspired the architecture of the Plantier de Costebelle<ref>Collection of the Musée d'Orsay, Paris.</ref>

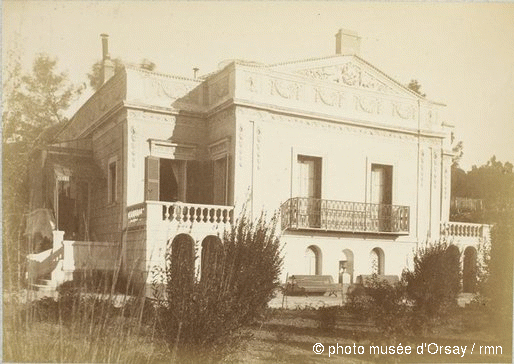
Villa Venadou, south facade, (Note: This photograph remained until 1981 in the collection of Madame Bernard Granet and her children and of Mademoiselle Solange Granet, descendants of Gustave Eiffel. In 1981, it was accepted by the State as a donation from Madame Bernard Granet and her children and Mademoiselle Solange Granet to the Musée d'Orsay.) no serlianas.

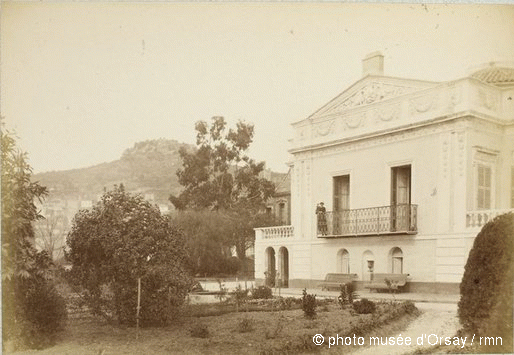
Main facade of the Villa Venadou.

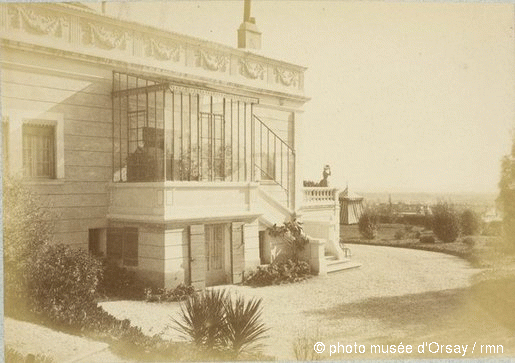
West facade with no steps at the Plantier.

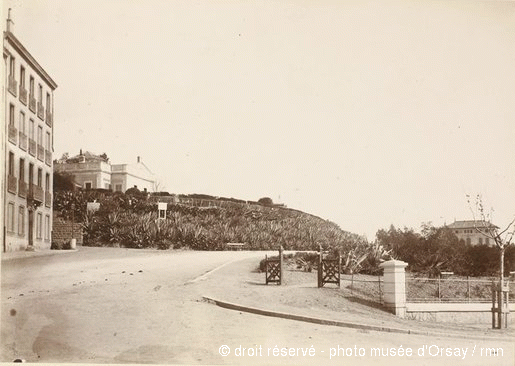
General view of the Villa Venadou.

=== Interior architecture ===
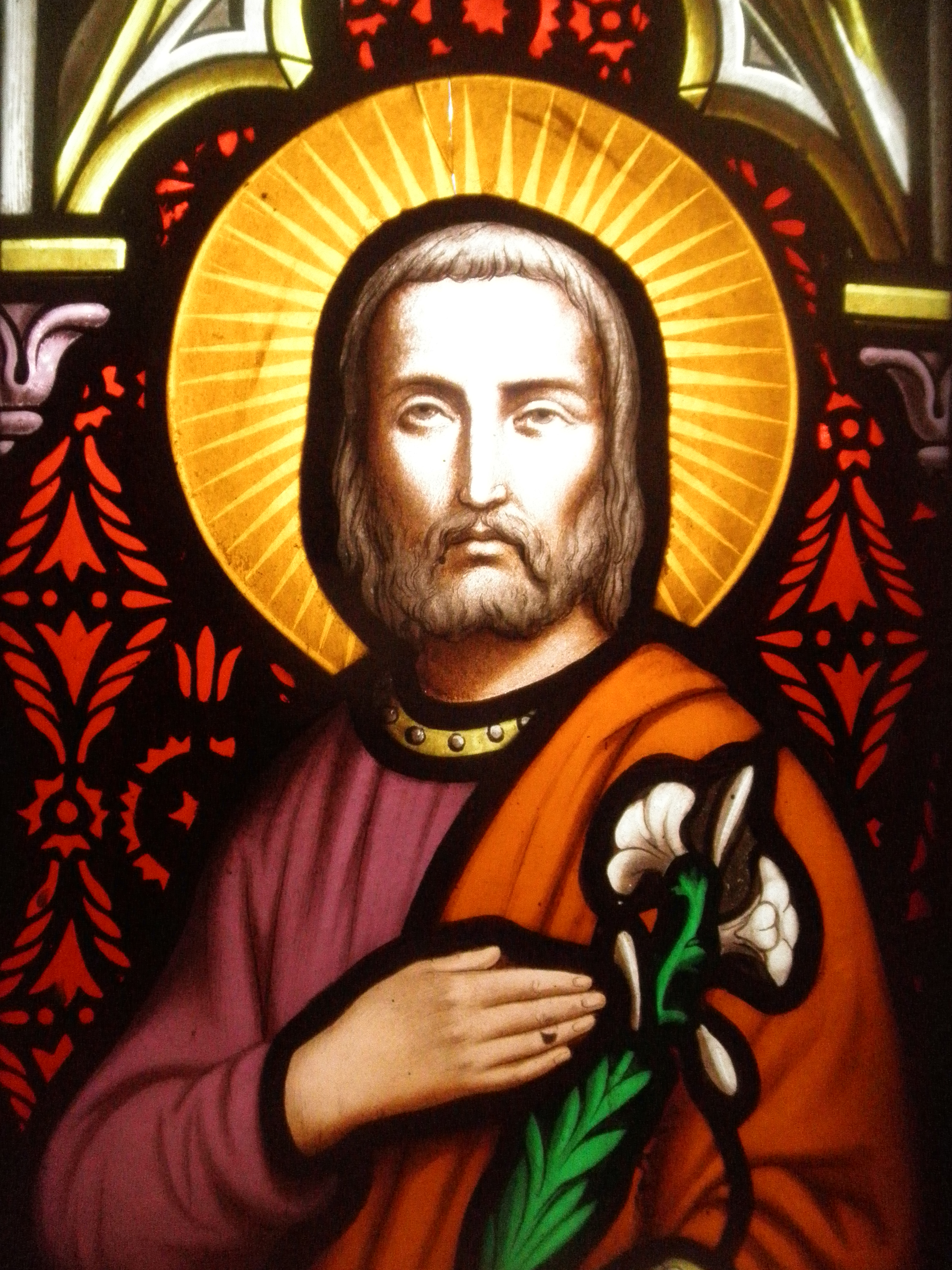
Saint Joseph, stained glass window, 1861.

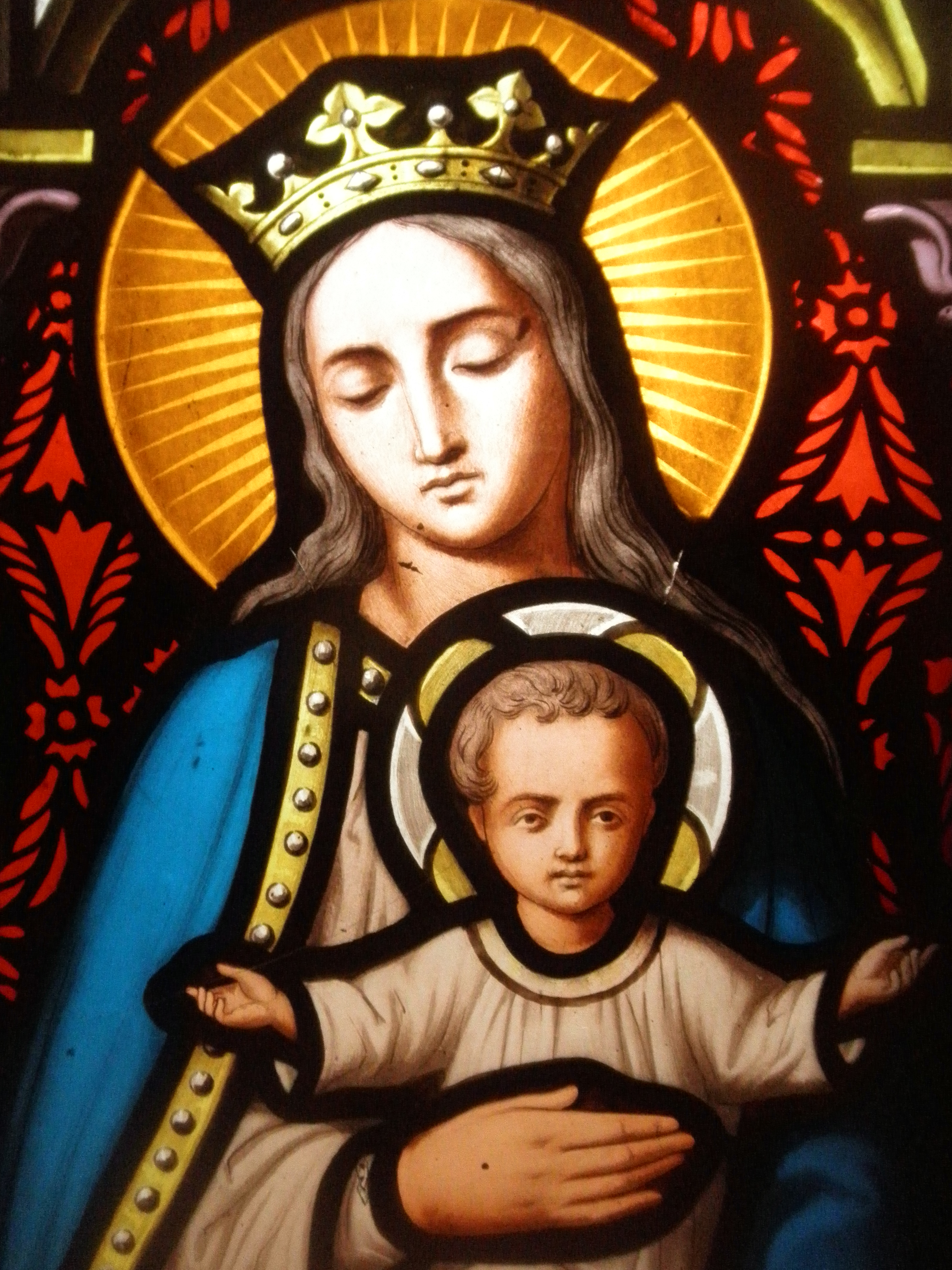
Virgin and Child, stained glass window, 1861.

The villa is structured around a central rotunda rising from the base level to the first floor, located directly above a cistern at ground level, designed to collect rainwater from the roof. The placement of the cistern appears to be a stylistic exercise in this Hyères villa, whereas in the Italian villas built by Andrea Palladio in the 16th century, such cisterns had clear agricultural use. The absence of a service staircase led Paul Bourget, upon purchasing the property, to commission architect Pierre Chapoulard to build an external staircase (Note: This exterior staircase, commissioned by Paul Bourget in 1896, was destroyed in 2008 during facade restoration work supervised by the architect of the Monuments of France. The aim was to restore the northern facade to its original appearance and not to apply the spirit of the Venice Charter (31 May 1964), which recommends, in matters of architecture, the preservation of successive additions.) as an extension on the north façade. The main drawing room, shaped like a "T," is framed by a quadrigeminous bay (with four openings) offering a panoramic view of the gardens.

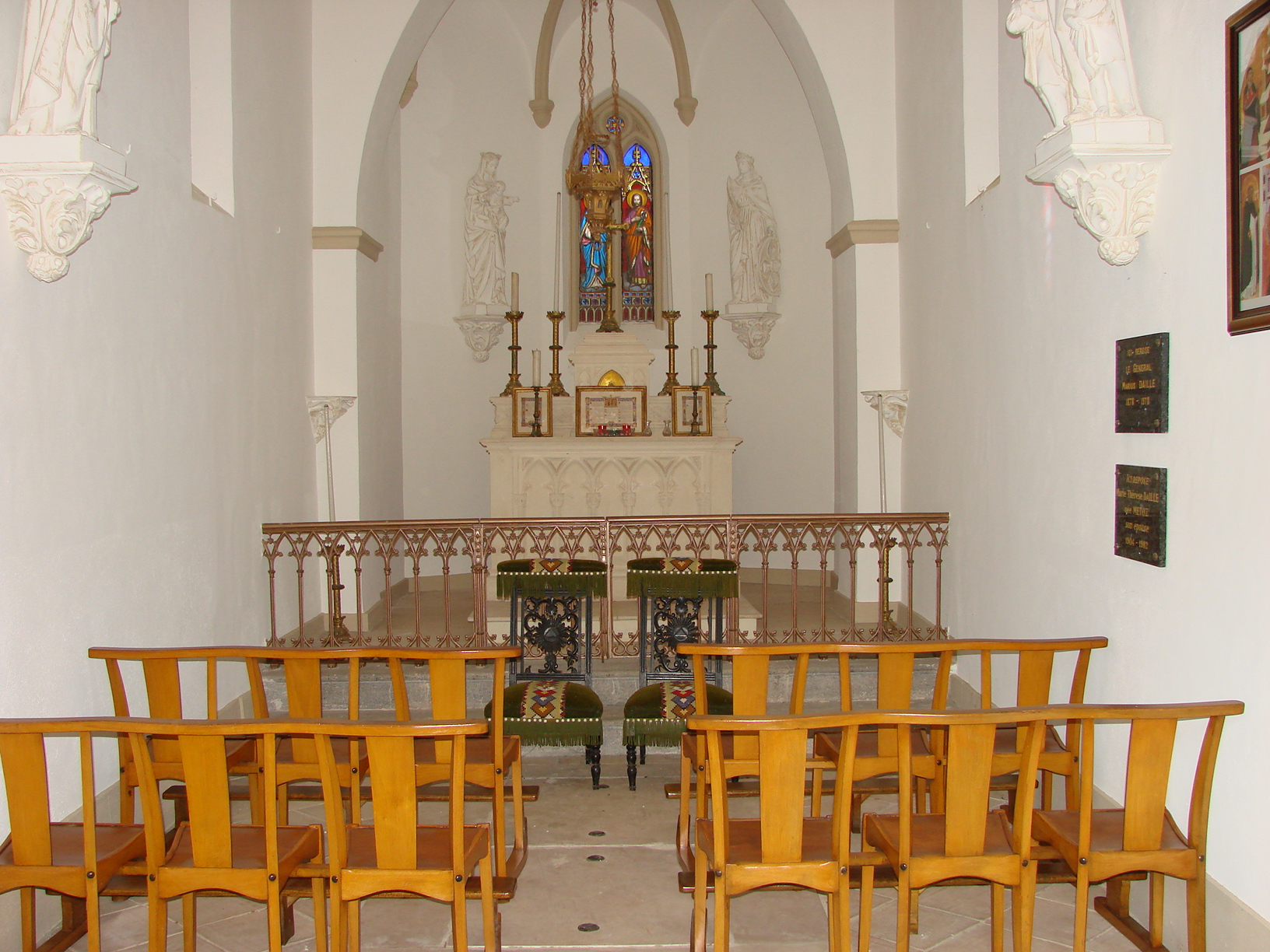
Inside the Plantier Chapel.

This T-shaped drawing room refers to the traditional layout of Venetian palaces; the rotunda can be found at Palladio's Villa Rotonda but also at the villa known as Rocca Pisana by Scamozzi in Lonigo, where this round room also sits above a cistern. Yet this bay, which curiously stands above the salon's fireplace as at Villa Tholozan, (Note: Listed as a historic monument in 1975. Villa built in 1858 for the Duke of Luynes (1803–1867). It was then inherited by the Marquise de Tholozan, who gave it her name. The architect was Frédéric Debacq (1800–1892). Along with the Villa Léautaud and Le Plantier de Costebelle, it represents 19th-century aristocratic holiday resorts in Hyères. These three properties are the only ones still in private hands today that have been able to preserve, intact, the vast botanical parks surrounding them and their original architecture.) appears to be only an illustration of Palladian style, as it hesitates between the traditional trigeminal openings of the Veneto and Serlian compositions, reaching a compromise that poorly respects the ternary rhythm. This type of window is mentioned by Sebastiano Serlio in his nine-volume book Tutte l'opere d'archittura e prospetiva, which presents the ideal principles of Vitruvius and Roman architecture. This type of arched window flanked by two lower openings is an architectural feature that appeared with the triumphal arches of ancient Rome. It is also a distinctive feature of the entrance to Villa Forni Cerato. The distribution of the building's three levels follows the precepts of Andrea Palladio: the rustic ground floor contains service rooms for the household staff; the noble floor (piano nobile) hosts reception rooms and main bedrooms organized around an atrium with overhead lighting; finally, the third level contains the secondary bedrooms. The villa's lower ground floor also houses a large strongroom where Paul Bourget stored his Sienese paintings when he left Le Plantier de Costebelle at the end of the winter season.

Dedicated to the Virgin Mary, the chapel contains statues of Saint Dominic and Saint Vincent de Paul, patrons of a religious order and charitable congregation to which the Baroness de Prailly likely felt a personal commitment. Statues of Saint Joseph and Saint Catherine of Alexandria are also present. The chapel is the burial site of the last heir of Paul Bourget, General Daille.

Architectural plans: comparative floor plans and elevation

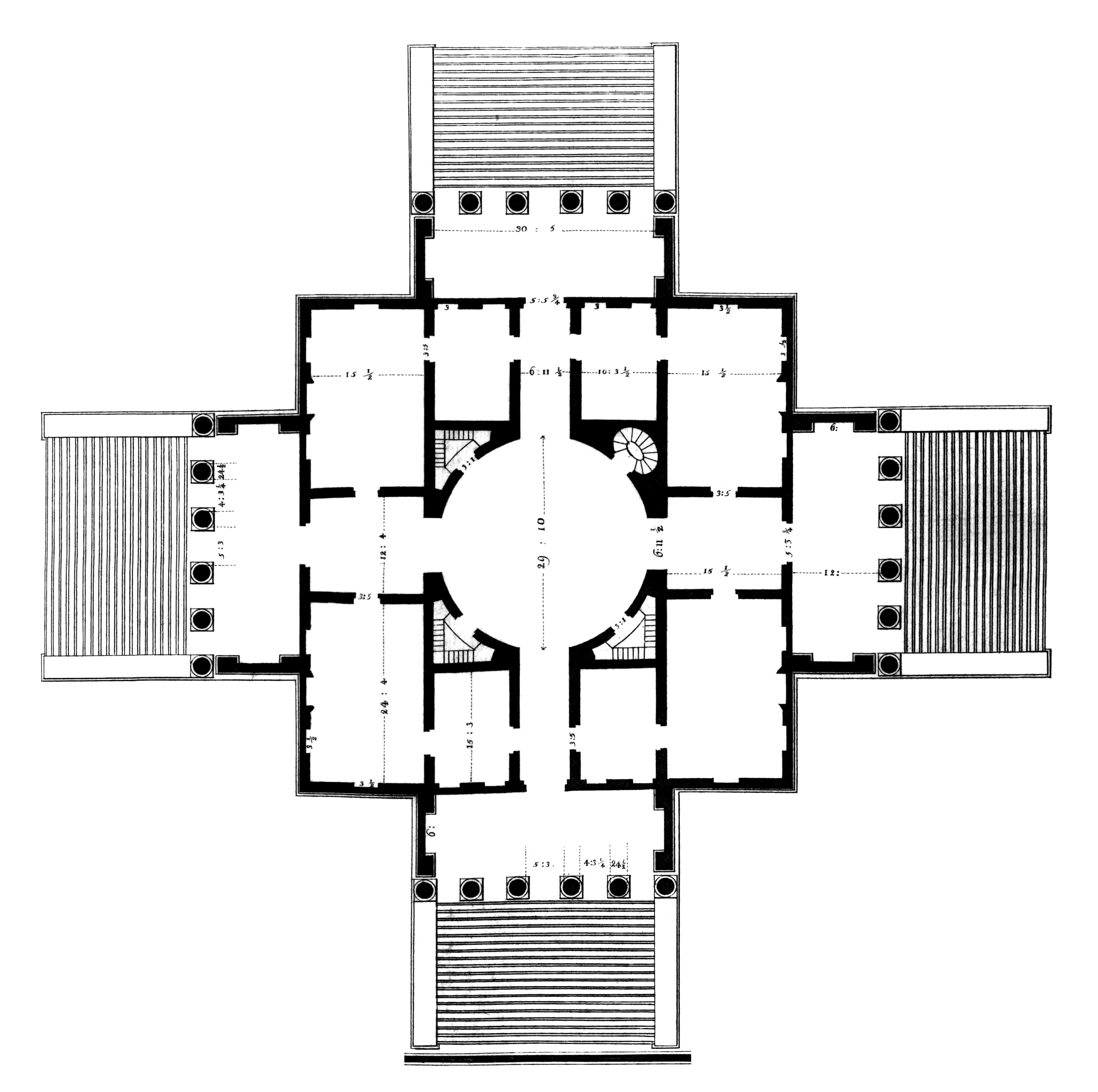
Andrea Palladio, engraving of the plan of the villa "La Rotonda" with central rotunda.

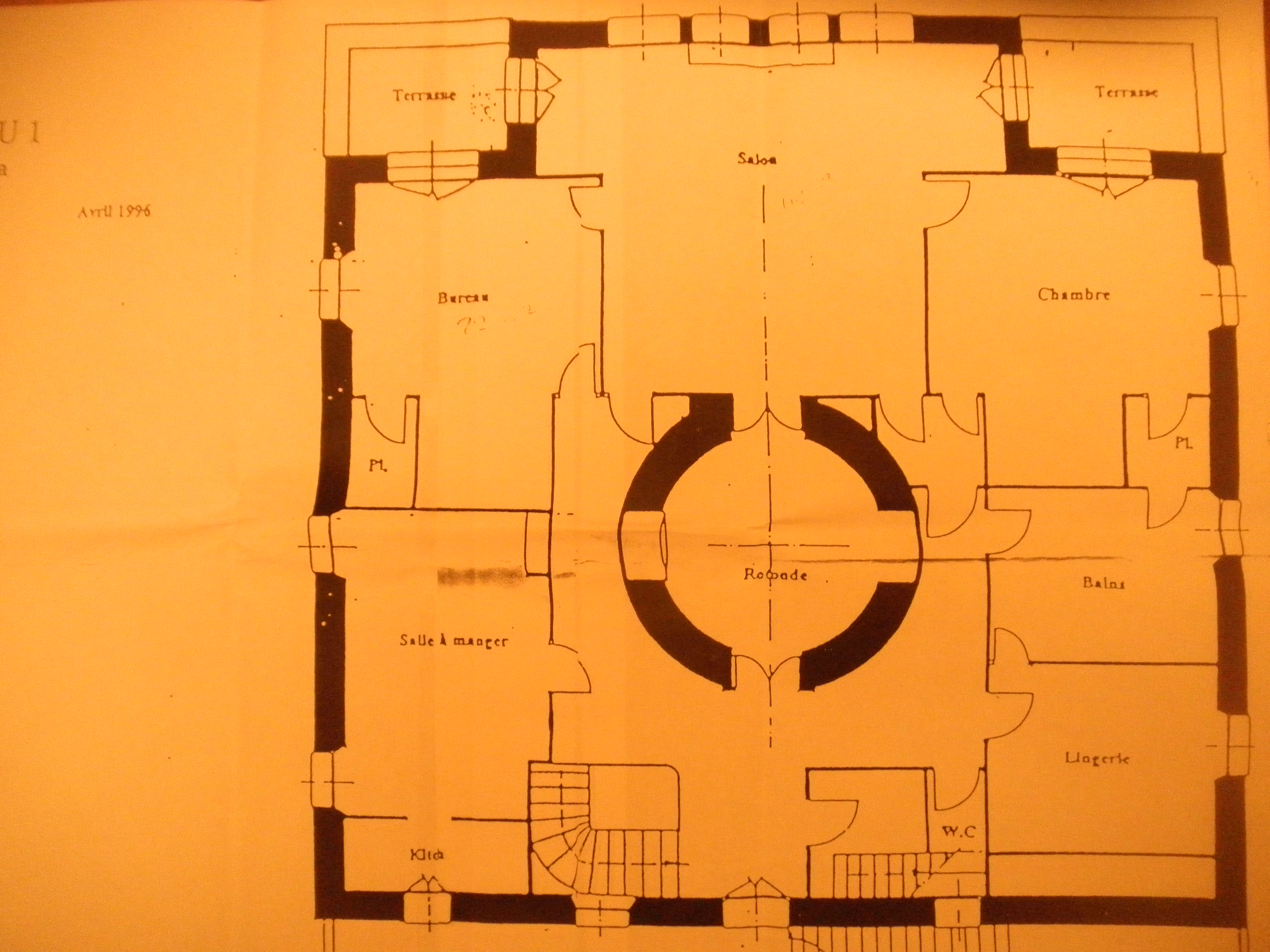
Interior plans of the main floor of the Plantier with central rotunda.

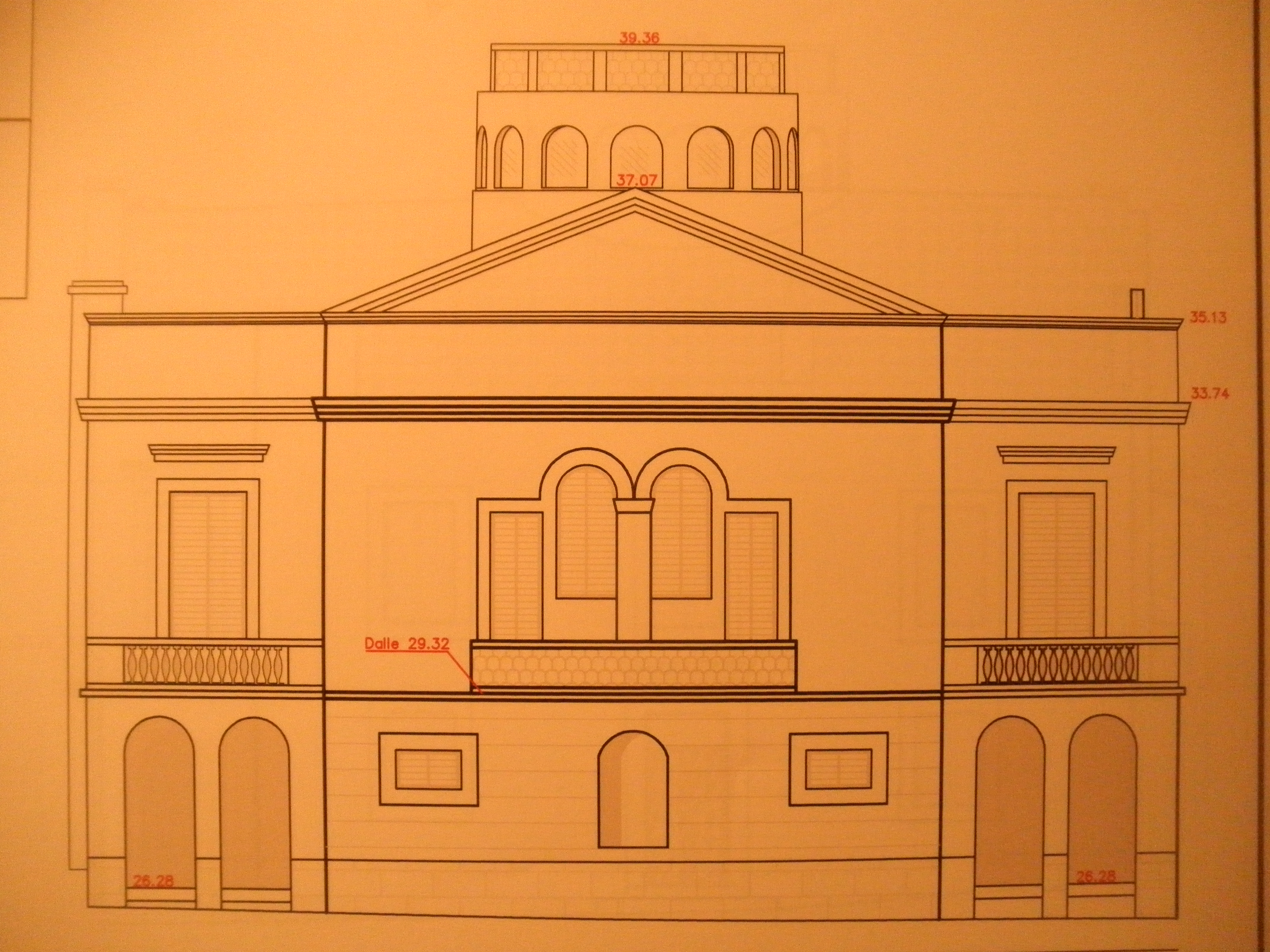
Serlian windows of the Plantier on the first floor of the main facade.

== Botanical park ==
=== Geographical, bioclimatic and faunal context ===
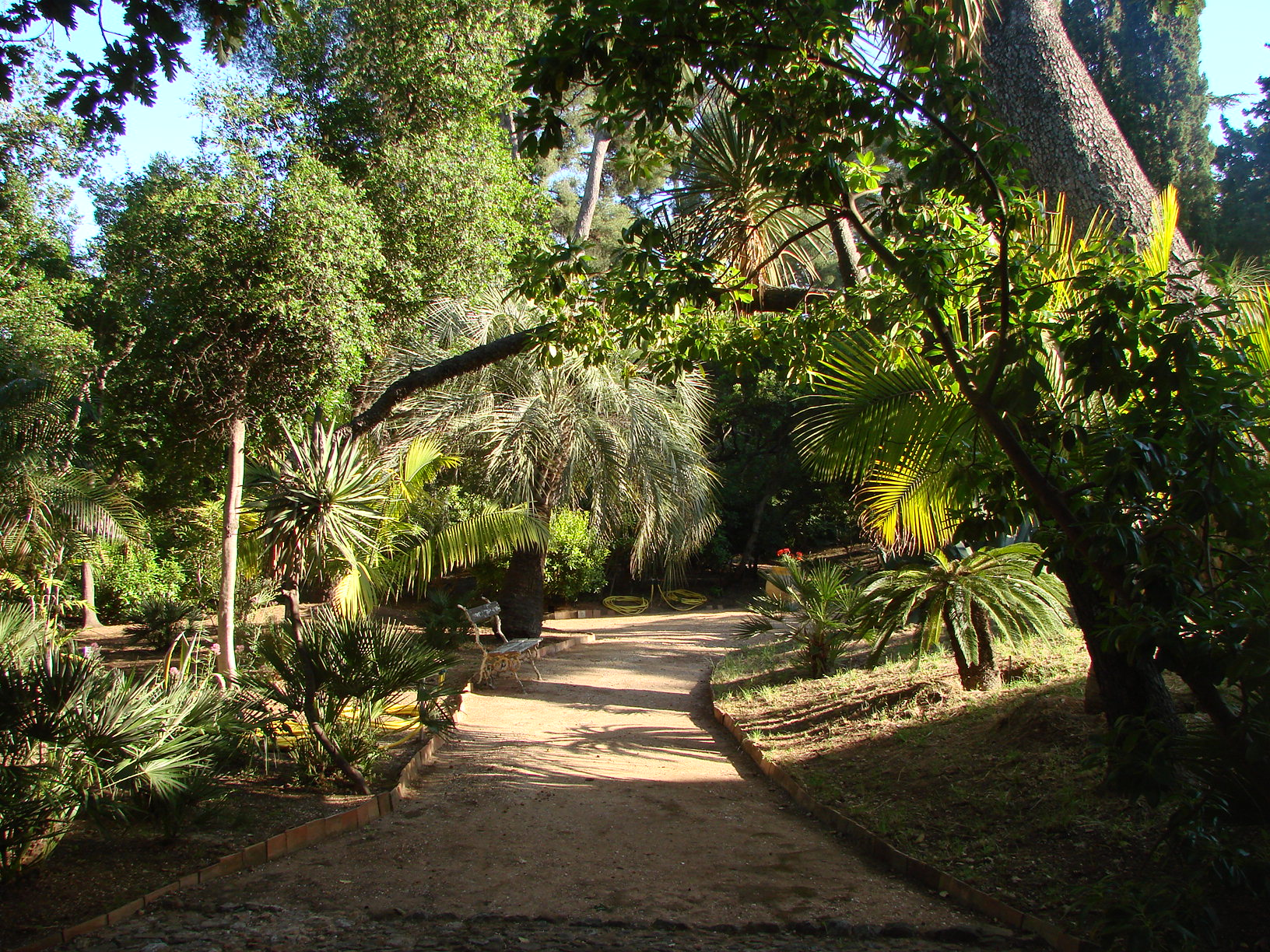
The Plantier de Costebelle Botanical Park.

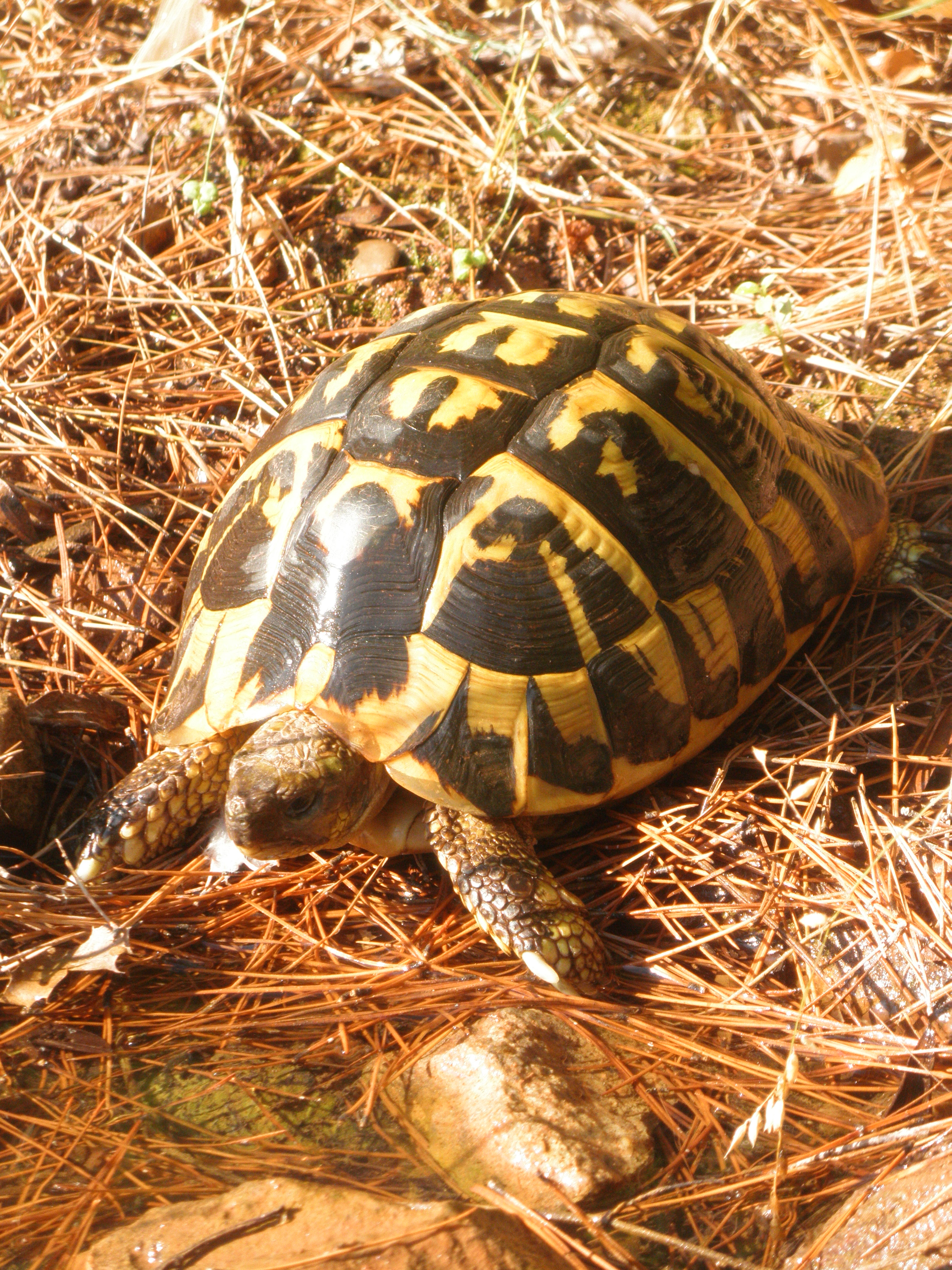
Wild Hermann's tortoise at Plantier de Costebelle.

The Plantier de Costebelle park is located in Hyères (43° 05′ 45″ N, 6° 07′ 12″ E), at an elevation ranging from 90 to 120 meters. The sloping areas correspond to the southeast side of Mont des Oiseaux. The entire estate lies within the designated wooded area of the Costebelle hills, beneath the Pic des Fées. This zone, which also includes the Coupiane hills and covers approximately 284 hectares, constitutes a natural area of ecological, faunal, and floral interest (ZNIEFF) of type II, meaning it has significant biological potential. (Note: The listing of the hills of Costebelle in the "ZNIEFF" inventories highlights their biological richness, but this status is purely descriptive, it has no legal weight and offers no means for study, management, or protection.) The private estates of Plantier de Costebelle, Font des Horts, and Villa Léautaud, whose original dimensions remain intact, form the main part of the wild and natural section of this eastern slope of the Pic des Fées and the Costebelle plateau.

The climate is a temperate subhumid Mediterranean type, with an average dry period from April through September and a rainy season from November to March. The rainfall regime places Costebelle, in terms of potential vegetation, in the warmest zone of the French Mediterranean coast, on the boundary between thermo- and meso-Mediterranean stages. This massif also lies between the limestone Provence to the west and crystalline Provence to the east, encouraging the development of ubiquitous vegetation. (Note: Said of a species that can be found in most habitats due to its very high ecological plasticity.) The area is home to carob tree formations and their thermophilic floral companions, such as the dwarf palm, (Note: Le Plantier is truly "invaded" by the dwarf palm (Chamaerops humilis), the only species of palm tree endemic to mainland France, which grows there naturally and is protected by a decree dated January 20, 1982.) which has naturalized in the Costebelle scrubland for at least fifty years, the tree spurge, Jupiter's beard, and remnants of lowland holm oak groves with Arisarum. The mirror orchid (Ophrys ciliata) can also be found there in extremely localized spots. The nearest Météo-France weather station is in Hyères. Although the plant hardiness zone is 10—meaning the climate is warm enough to allow many tropical plants to thrive—the absence of extreme summer heat allows temperate or oceanic plants to flourish. Thus, it is incorrect to claim that the orange-growing zone includes the stretch of coastline between Toulon (and therefore Hyères) and the Italian border. While citrus trees do grow there, the only area on the Côte d'Azur where citrus fruits can be grown profitably is confined to the section between Cap d'Ail and the Italian border, with the optimal conditions in Garavan.

Due to the endemic presence of a relict population of Hermann's tortoises, (Note: The hills of Costebelle and Mount des Oiseaux constitute the westernmost wild and natural sanctuary in the Var department for Testudo hermanni hermanni (Gmelin, 1789), since the other locations in the municipality of Hyères where this endangered reptile is found are the islands of Port-Cros and Levant (where populations were artificially reintroduced on both islands), and the western slopes of the Maures massif (valleys of Sauvebonne and Borrels), which are geographically further east.) protected under Appendix II (Note: In addition to international legislation (Washington Convention—"CITES" and Bern Convention), the Hermann's tortoise is also protected by European legislation (Habitats Directive, 92/43/EEC) and national legislation (protected reptiles).) of the Washington Convention, within this sanctuary territory entirely enclosed by old walls, mowing is done outside of the nesting (from May 15 to early July) and breeding seasons, and the use of phytosanitary products is prohibited. The preferred biotope of the Hermann's tortoise is located in the southern zone of the Plantier estate: cork oak (Quercus suber), downy oak (Quercus pubescens), maritime pine (Pinus pinaster), strawberry tree (Arbutus unedo), tree heath (Erica arborea), narrow-leaved mock privet (Phillyrea angustifolia), Calycotome spinosa, Montpellier broom (Cytisus monspessulanus), Spanish broom (Spartium junceum), and mastic tree (Pistacia lentiscus). Its optimal thermal preference (Note: The thermal preferendum is the narrow temperature range in which the metabolism of this ectotherm functions optimally.) across the entire property ranges between 25 °C and 30 °C.

=== Spirit of the Botanical Park: The acclimatization garden ===
==== Acclimatizers at the Plantier de Costebelle ====
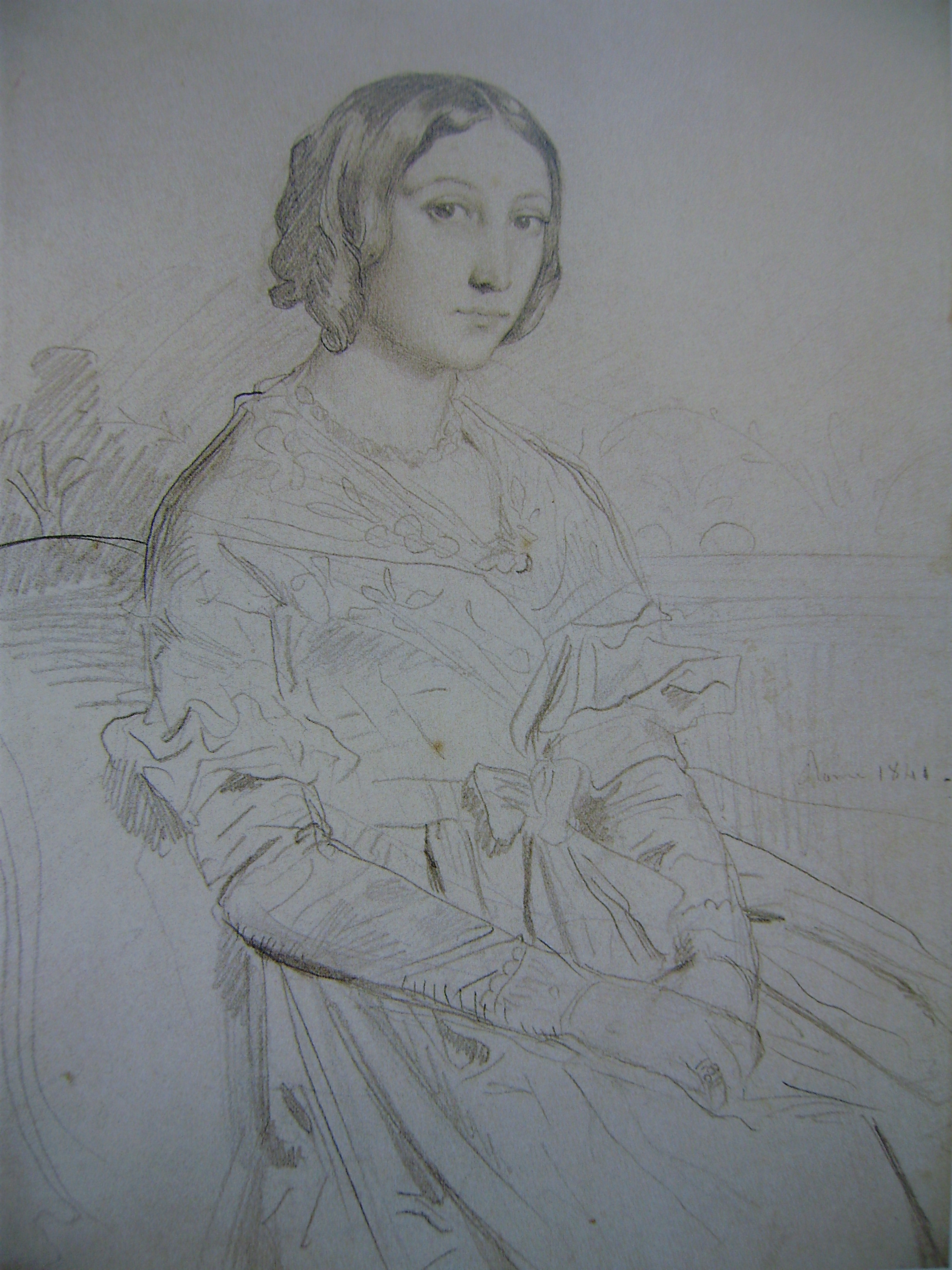
The Baroness de Prailly in 1841 by Théodore Chassériau.

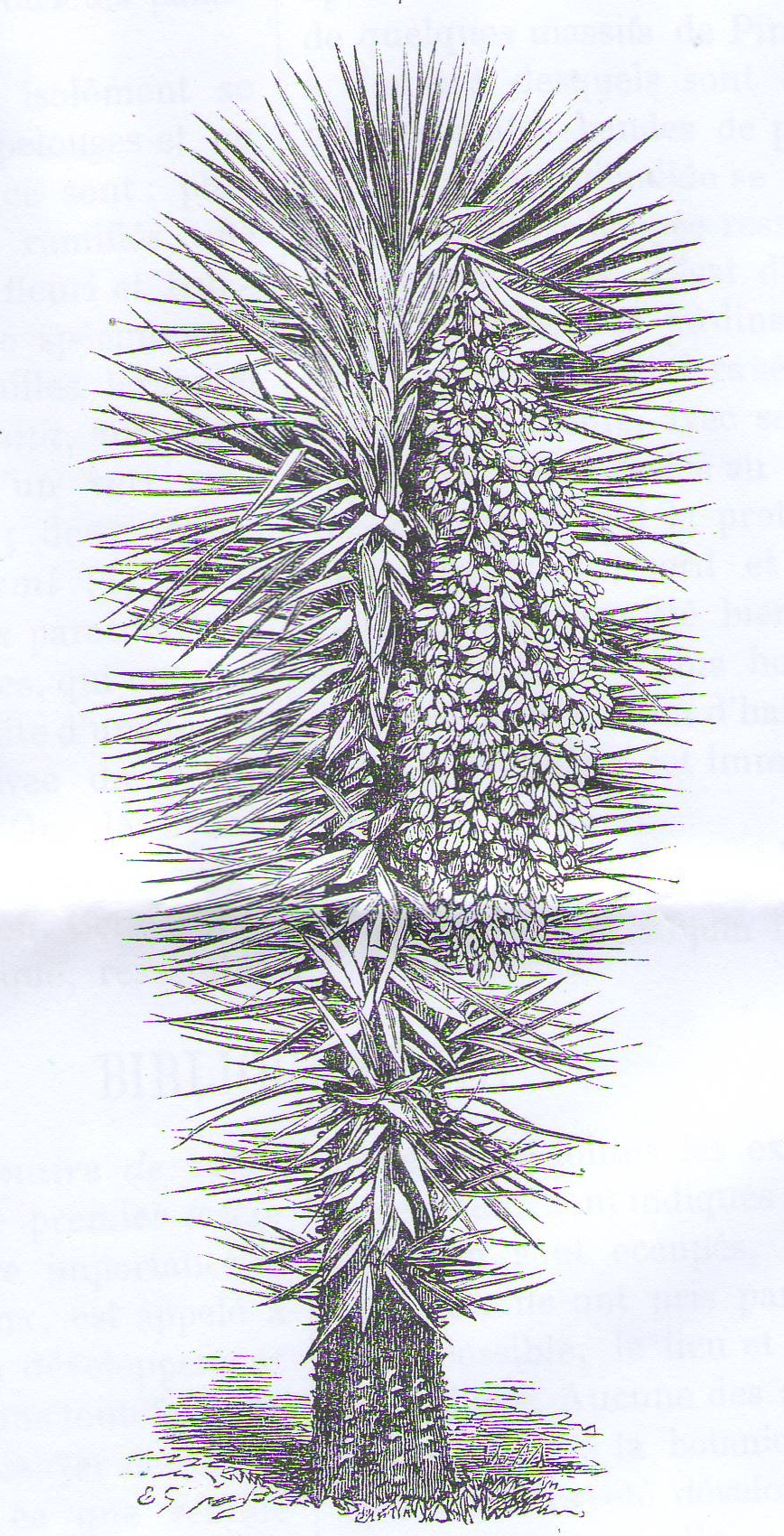
First flowering of Yucca filifera at Plantier de Costebelle, 1876.

Mr. and Mrs. de Prailly introduced various exotic plant species beginning in 1857 and turned the park into an acclimatization garden, described by Justin-Baptistin Chabaud in the Revue horticole of 1876: Phoenix dactylifera gave its name to the Villa des Palmiers and is found throughout the park; four Jubaea spectabilis specimens were planted and are among the most beautiful on the Côte d'Azur; Sabal umbraculifera is also present alongside six fan palms with digitate leaves.

In an artfully organized confusion, lemon groves alternate with Poncires, citrons, and clumps of new variegated varieties of New Zealand flax. During his visit to the park on June 14, 1876, Chabaud also noted Dracaena indivisa, a magnificent specimen of Yucca treculeana, Beschorneria argyrophylla in full bloom with 3-meter-high flower stalks, and Agave salmiana. The harsh winter of 1870 proved fatal to Araucaria cunninghamii, while Araucaria bidwillii survived the frost.

The Baron de Prailly, an astute acclimatizer, sourced pollen from Dasylirion from the Parc de la Tête-d'Or (Note: This pollen transfer, reported by Chabaud in the Revue Horticole of 1876, is perhaps due to the intervention of the immediate neighbor of Baron de Prailly, at the Villa Marguerite—Gustave Bonnet, director of Lyon's Parc de la Tête d'Or.) in Lyon to achieve artificial pollination of two female Dasylirion plants, which produced a few fruits in the 1870s. The Praillys maintained relationships with at least three horticulturists, seed producers, and sellers: the Hyères-based firm Charles Huber Frères & Compagnie, the Parisian house Vilmorin-Andrieux, and the German producer Haage & Schmidt from Erfurt.

A chrysanthemum variety named Baron de Prailly is mentioned in specialized horticultural publications at the end of the 19th century.

==== Botanists welcomed at the Plantier de Costebelle ====
Rose 1871 "Baronne de Prailly."

The Plantier de Costebelle was never a botanical garden intended to collect plants for their own sake but a garden of plants arranged for aesthetic pleasure. Besides succulents, cacti, and strawberry trees, mimosas, oaks, cedars, and palms make up most of the large plant species and are laid out to integrate harmoniously into the environment. The acclimatization movement of exotic plants began in Hyères in 1832 under the initiative of its mayor, Alphonse Denis, and the Plantier de Costebelle, thanks to the botanical vision of Baron and Baroness de Prailly, became one of its examples, serving effectively as a conservatory for certain species such as the Cyprus strawberry tree, which grows there endemically.

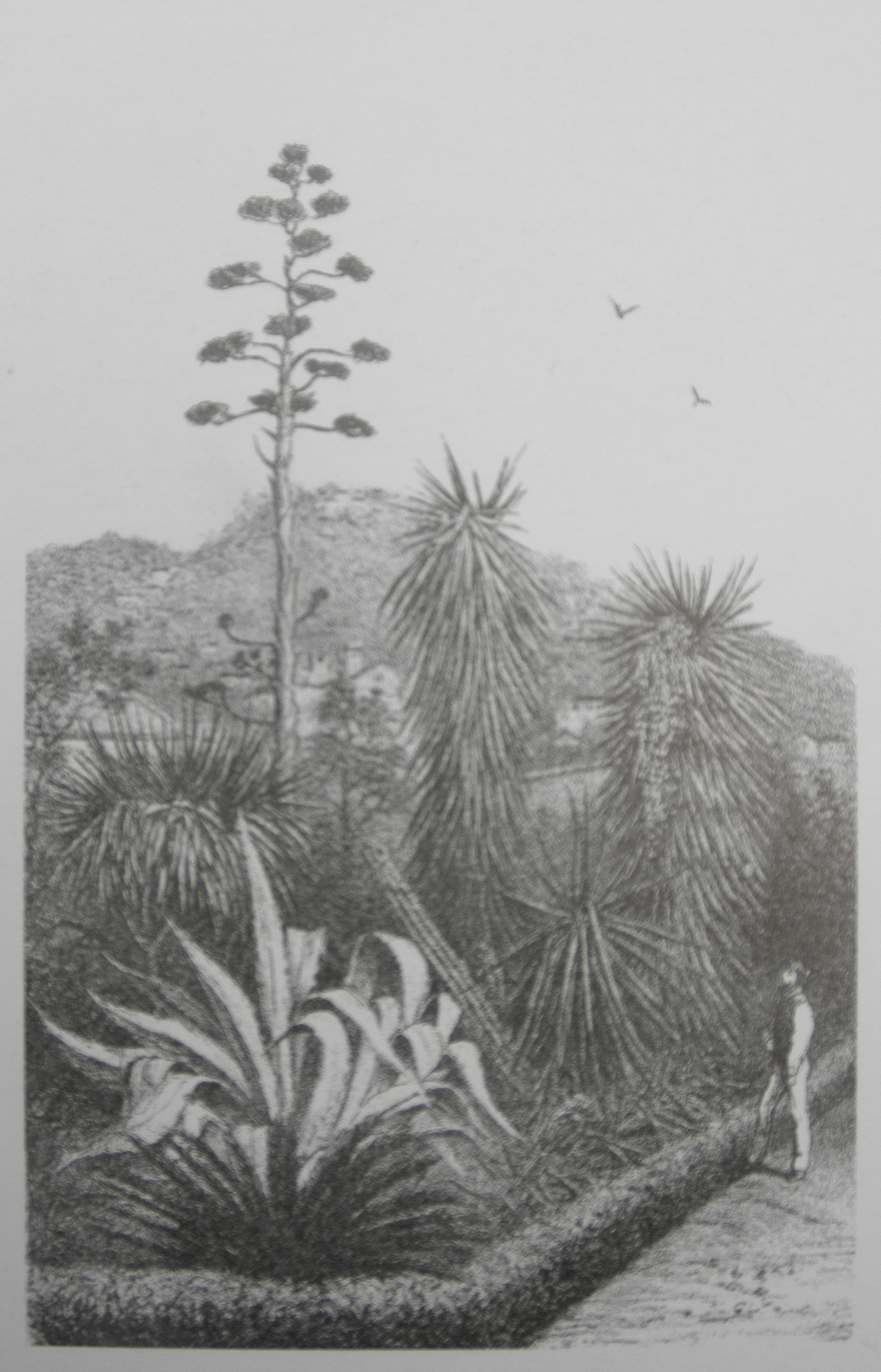
The Huber Garden in 1882 Yucca filifera in bloom.

The Praillys hosted botanist Justin-Baptistin Chabaud on June 14, 1876, as well as the director of the Natural History Museum of Nice, Émile Sauvaigo. Immediate neighbors of the Plantier were regular visitors to the Praillys: Gustave Bonnet, director of the Parc de la Tête d'Or, at Villa Marguerite, and botanist Jacques Nicolas Ernest Germain de Saint-Pierre at the Château de Saint-Pierre des Horts. Charles Huber participated in the plantings, and the Lyon horticulturist Jean Liabaud created a rose in 1871 named "Baronne de Prailly," a remontant hybrid shrub rose (remontant perpetual hybrids were a major success of the second half of the 19th century and are considered "old" roses). This rare cultivar grows to 120 centimeters in height and produces a beautiful, intensely pink, fragrant flower with regularly imbricated petals: (Note: The fact that Gustave Bonnet, director of Lyon's Parc de la Tête d'Or, was a close neighbor of the Praillys in Hyères, that J. Liabaud, a Lyon horticulturist, dedicated a rose to the Baroness de Prailly, and finally that Baron de Prailly requested Dasylirion pollen from the Lyon Botanical Garden, are all converging clues suggesting a possible botanical collaboration among the three, especially since they all belonged to the same generation.)

(...) Bright red, large, very full ; often does not open well. Moderate vigor...flower large bright red, globular, too heavy for the stems which are rather slight and flexuose...Mme la Baronne de Prailly lives in Hyères (...)

— The Old Rose Advisor, Volume I, Brent C. Dickerson, 2001, p. 418.

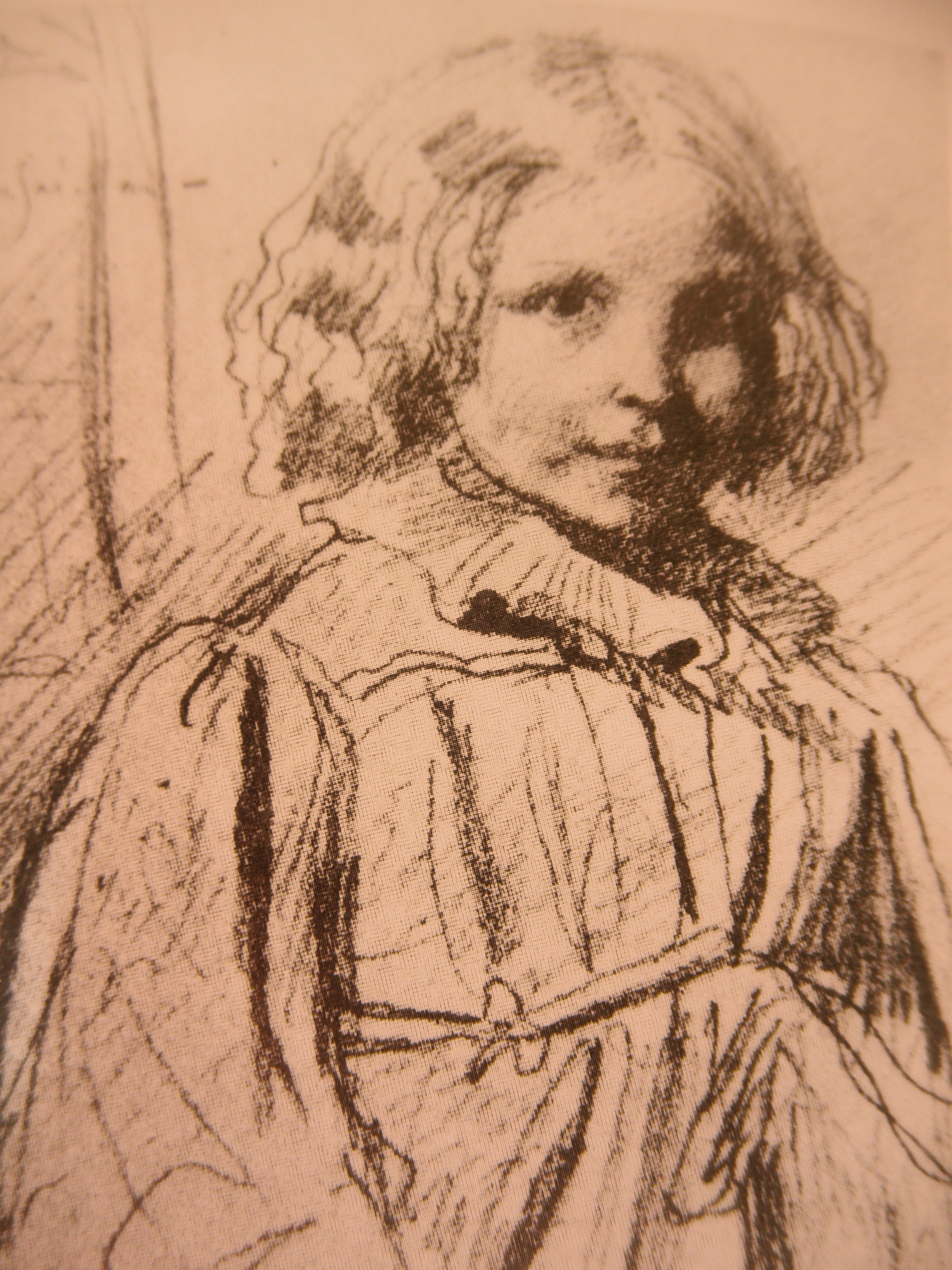
Berthe de Prailly by Théodore Chassériau, during his stay in Rome, 1840.

In the 1920s, prominent acclimatizers and amateur gardeners visited the Plantier de Costebelle, often at the initiative of Edith Wharton, who resided at the neighboring Sainte-Claire estate and was passionate about the cultivation of Mediterranean plants. Paul and Minnie Bourget thus hosted Charles McLaren (1st Baron Aberconway) and his wife, Lady Aberconway, owners of the garden of La Garoupe and the Bodnant Botanical Garden in England. They also welcomed Major Lawrence Johnston, the renowned creator of the gardens of La Serre de la Madone and the Hidcote Manor Botanical Garden.

==== The Riviera of the acclimatizers ====
The botanical park of the Plantier de Costebelle has remained unchanged since its creation in 1857. The protection status granted in 1976 prevented any modifications or arrangements that could have altered the atmosphere of a 19th-century garden, a testament to a forgotten and distant Côte d'Azur once adored by English visitors who came for winter stays. Thanks to the presence of ancient plantings, the ambiance is reminiscent of certain parks in Menton, such as that of the Villa Maria Serena, a typical holiday villa in the Garavan district on the Mediterranean Riviera, built by Charles Garnier. With its Plantier garden also evokes the park of Le Manteau in Tamaris, designed by Michel Pacha, where one can find, in a rare regional instance, a Caryota, a Kentia, or two spectacular Araucarias. (Note: The Château du Manteau has been destroyed. Only its exceptional park remains, now part of a large modern co-ownership residence and closed to the public.)

=== Characteristics of the Plantier de Costebelle Park ===
==== Living collections of the botanical park ====
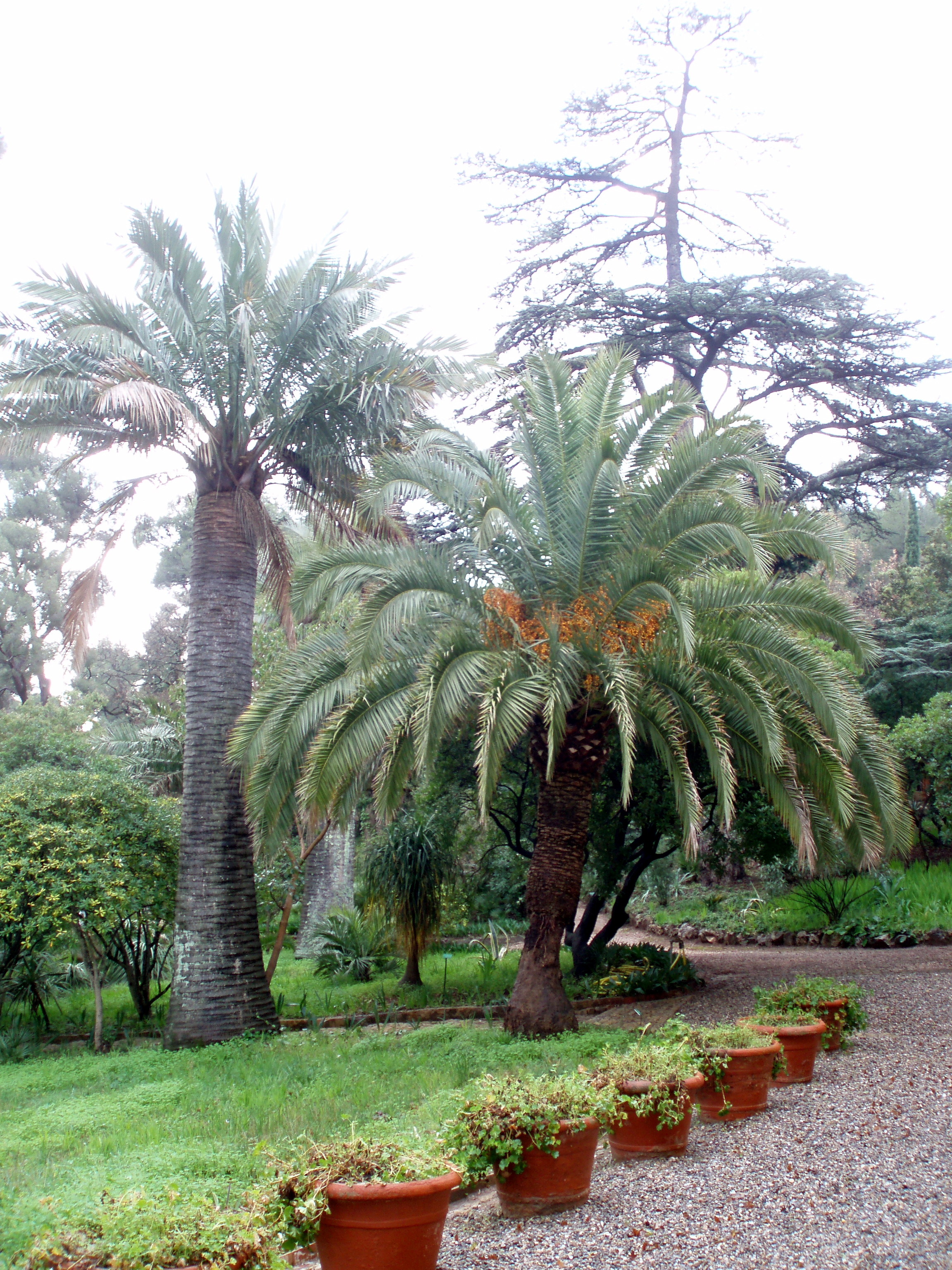
A Jubaea chilensis and a Phoenix canariensis at Plantier de Costebelle.

- Phoenix canariensis (Canary Island date palm, palm of Hyères)
- Jubaea chilensis (Chilean wine palm, honey palm)*
- Butia capitata (pindo palm, jelly palm, apricot palm, varnish tree of Brazil)
- Phoenix roebelenii (Mekong date palm, pygmy date palm)
- Syagrus romanzoffiana (queen palm, feathery coconut palm of Uruguay)
- Sabal palmetto (cabbage palmetto, Florida palm)*
- Cycas revoluta (sago palm, "sago of bygone times")
- Dasylirion serratifolium and Dasylirion glaucophyllum (bearded dasylirion of Mexico)
- Washingtonia robusta (Mexican washingtonia, Mexican fan palm)
- Brachychiton sp. (bottle tree of Australia)
- Nolina longifolia (long-leaved nolina of Oaxaca)*
- Chamaedorea microspadix (bamboo palm of Mexico)
- Juniperus drupacea (Syrian juniper)*
- Trachycarpus fortunei (Chinese windmill palm, hemp palm)
- Beaucarnea recurvata (recurved nolina, elephant's foot of Mexico)
- Yucca rostrata (beaked yucca of Texas)
- Yucca elephantipes (giant yucca, elephant yucca of Guatemala)
- Pinus canariensis (Canary Island pine, Tenerife pine)*
- Rhamnus alaternus (Italian buckthorn, black plum, "niger prunus")
- Brahea armata (blue hesper palm of Baja California)
- Callistemon sp. (bottlebrush tree of Australia)
- Dracaena draco (dragon tree of the Canaries, common dragon tree)
- Yucca filifera (St. Peter's palm of Mexico)*
- Agave americana (American agave, century plant, maguey)
- Agave americana marginata (striped American agave, pita agave)
- Agave americana var. medio picta aurea (yellow-variegated American agave of Mexico)
- Agave salmiana var. ferox (ferox agave of Mexico)
- Pinus sabiniana (gray pine of California)*
- Beschorneria yuccoides (yucca-like beschorneria of Mexico)
- Agave attenuata (foxtail agave, swan-neck agave)
- Cycas circinalis (queen sago palm of India)*
- Araucaria araucana (monkey puzzle tree, "monkey's despair," of Chile)
- Trachycarpus wagnerianus (Wagner's palm, miniature Chusan palm)*
- Livistona chinensis (Chinese fan palm, fountain palm)*
- Chamaerops humilis (European fan palm, dwarf palm, false doum palm)
- Arbutus andrachne (Greek strawberry tree, strawberry tree of Cyprus)*
- Arbutus unedo (common strawberry tree of the Mediterranean)
- Pinus halepensis (Aleppo pine)*
- Quercus suber (cork oak)
- Cedrus libani (cedar of Lebanon)
- Jasminum humile subsp. humile (relic yellow jasmine)
- Arbutus ×andrachnoides (hybrid strawberry tree of the Mediterranean)
- Freesia alba (white freesia of South Africa)
- Pittosporum tobira (Japanese mock orange, sticky-seeded pittosporum of New Caledonia)
- Cupressus sempervirens (Mediterranean cypress, common cypress)
- Quercus pubescens (downy oak, white oak, truffle oak)*
- Kerria japonica (Japanese kerria, Japanese rose)
- Acacia dealbata (silver wattle, winter mimosa, florist's mimosa)
- Spiraea arguta (garland spirea, Japanese spirea)
- Yucca gloriosa (Spanish dagger, glorious yucca of Mississippi)
- Agave lophantha poselgeri (lophantha agave of Texas)
- Agave salmiana (salmiana agave of Mexico)
- Agave bracteosa (spider agave)
- Ceratonia siliqua (carob tree)
- Agave angustifolia variegata (variegated agave of Costa Rica)
- Agave parryi truncata (truncated Parry's agave, "patonii agave" of Mexico)
- Agave americana var. medio picta alba (white-variegated American agave of Mexico)
- Pistacia lentiscus (mastic tree, lentisk, mastic pistachio tree of the Mediterranean basin)
- Agave sisalana (sisal agave of Mexico)
- Urginea maritima (sea squill of the Mediterranean basin)
- Chasmanthe floribunda (African chasmanthe of South Africa)
- Agapanthus praecox (African lily, agapanthus of South Africa)
- Phoenix canariensis × dactylifera (Canary Island date palm hybrid)
- Yucca torreyi (Torrey's yucca, John Torrey yucca of Texas)
- Yucca schottii (Schott's yucca of Arizona)
- Quercus rysophylla (Loquat-leaf oak of Mexico, Peckerwood Garden oak, Texas)
- Encephalartos altensteinii (eastern Cape encephalartos, South Africa)*
- Cordyline australis purpurea (purple cordyline of New Zealand)
- Araucaria heterophylla (Norfolk Island pine, Norfolk Island)

Note: The plants followed by an asterisk (*) are remarkable either because of their age — for example, the Chilean wine palms planted by Hortense de Prailly or the Yucca filifera described by Chabaud in 1876 — or because of their rarity on the Mediterranean coast — the Cycas circinalis being the most notable.

==== Features of certain plants in the Plantier de Costebelle ====
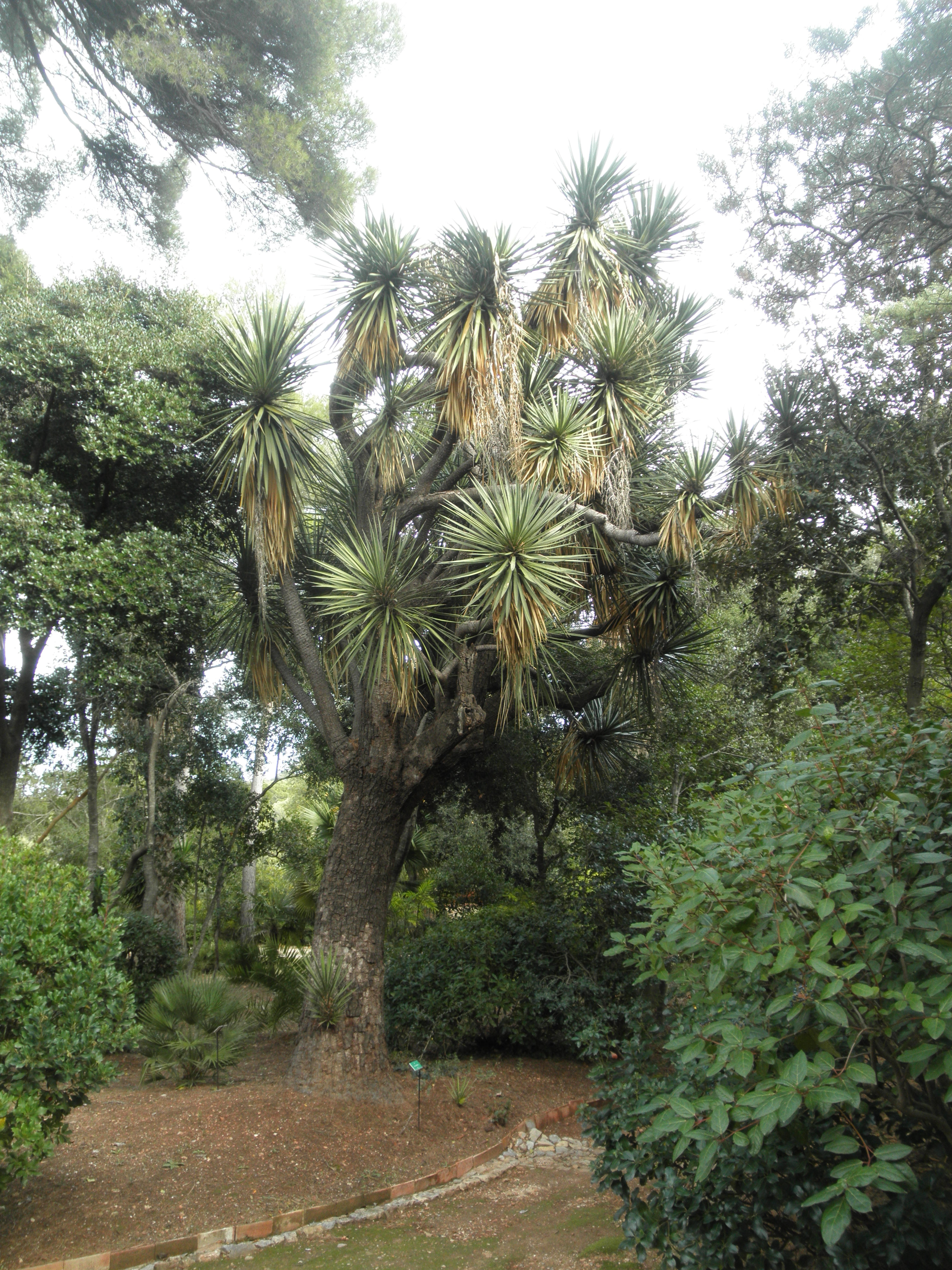
Yucca filifera described by Chabaud in 1876 in the original diagnosis of the species.

The venerable Chilean wine palms on the estate are the most massive of all palm trees in terms of trunk diameter. In Chile, the larger specimens have mostly been felled to extract their sweet sap, which flows abundantly and can be consumed as gruel, made into palm honey, or fermented like wine. A mature specimen can yield 450 liters of sap, a key reason for the species' rarity in its native land. This palm has been present in the park since after 1860 (Note: The specimens at the Plantier de Costebelle probably have the same origin as those at the Villa Thuret, since they were planted at the same time: Charles Naudin introduced the first seeds to France starting in 1850.) and was catalogued under the name Jubaea spectabilis by Giorgio Roster in 1915, having been planted after 1863 thanks to Charles Huber, director of the horticultural establishment Charles Huber et Compagnie. The botanist Justin-Benjamin Chabaud noted that the four specimens in the Plantier de Costebelle represented in the olive-growing region this "exceptional vegetation".

The rare coiled sago palm, a very archaic plant from southern India, has a reproductive system involving archaic, rudimentary flowers arranged in woody, cone-shaped inflorescences. Each individual typically bears only one type of cone, male or female, but they have been observed to occasionally change sex, a change often triggered by trauma.

Native to southern Brazil, the feathery coconut palm was discovered by a French-born naturalist, Louis Charles Adélaïde Chamisseau de Boncourt, who dedicated it to Russian Chancellor Nicholas Romanzoff, sponsor of the exploration in which he took part.

The miniature Chusan palm is unknown in the wild. It was described from cultivated plants and remains an enigma for specialists.

The Cyprus strawberry tree is distinguished by its bark, which exfoliates during summer to reveal a pistachio-green layer that gradually turns orange or brown. Given the large number of both young and mature specimens in the park, the Plantier de Costebelle acts as a true conservatory for this plant collection. Moreover, outside the boundaries of the Plantier estate, on the eastern slope of Mont des Oiseaux (Peak of the Fairies), thanks to seed dispersal from the park, several Cyprus strawberry trees grow among the native species (Aleppo pine woods, thermophilic grasslands with legumes).

The estate's oldest Saint Peter's palm was acquired as part of a lot of ten plants by the Baron de Prailly in 1860, 1866, and 1867 from the horticultural society Charles Huber (head gardener to Hyères' mayor Alphonse Denis), who sourced them from the Vilmorin-Andrieux nursery. These yuccas come from the Mexican highlands and were brought back by the Czech botanist Benedict Roezl for Philippe André de Vilmorin and the Hyères horticulturist Charles Huber. The latter sold the plants in lots of ten to the Baron de Prailly in 1866 and 1867. In 1869 and 1870, the Haage and Schmidt company from Erfurt sold the Praillys another variety of yucca, Yucca albo spica, which was planted alongside the existing Yucca filiferas. Justin-Baptistin Chabaud's examination of this second variety revealed similarities between the two species. Yucca filifera bloomed for the first time in Europe at the Plantier de Costebelle in 1876, three years before the death of the Baroness de Prailly. This first inflorescence, made up of panicles bearing large, drooping bells, was reproduced and described in the Revue Horticole in 1876 by Chabaud, while botanist John Gilbert Baker at the time considered it merely a variant of Yucca baccata. Chabaud explained that this first European inflorescence was likely triggered by a prior transplantation of the yucca in 1869 within the Plantier de Costebelle park itself. These operations, well known to gardeners and arborists, are used to hasten the flowering of slow-blooming plants. The year 1876 marks the effective publication date of the Revue Horticole in which the species and its original taxon were first described under the binomial Yucca filifera.

Some exotic plants in the Plantier de Costebelle acclimatization park

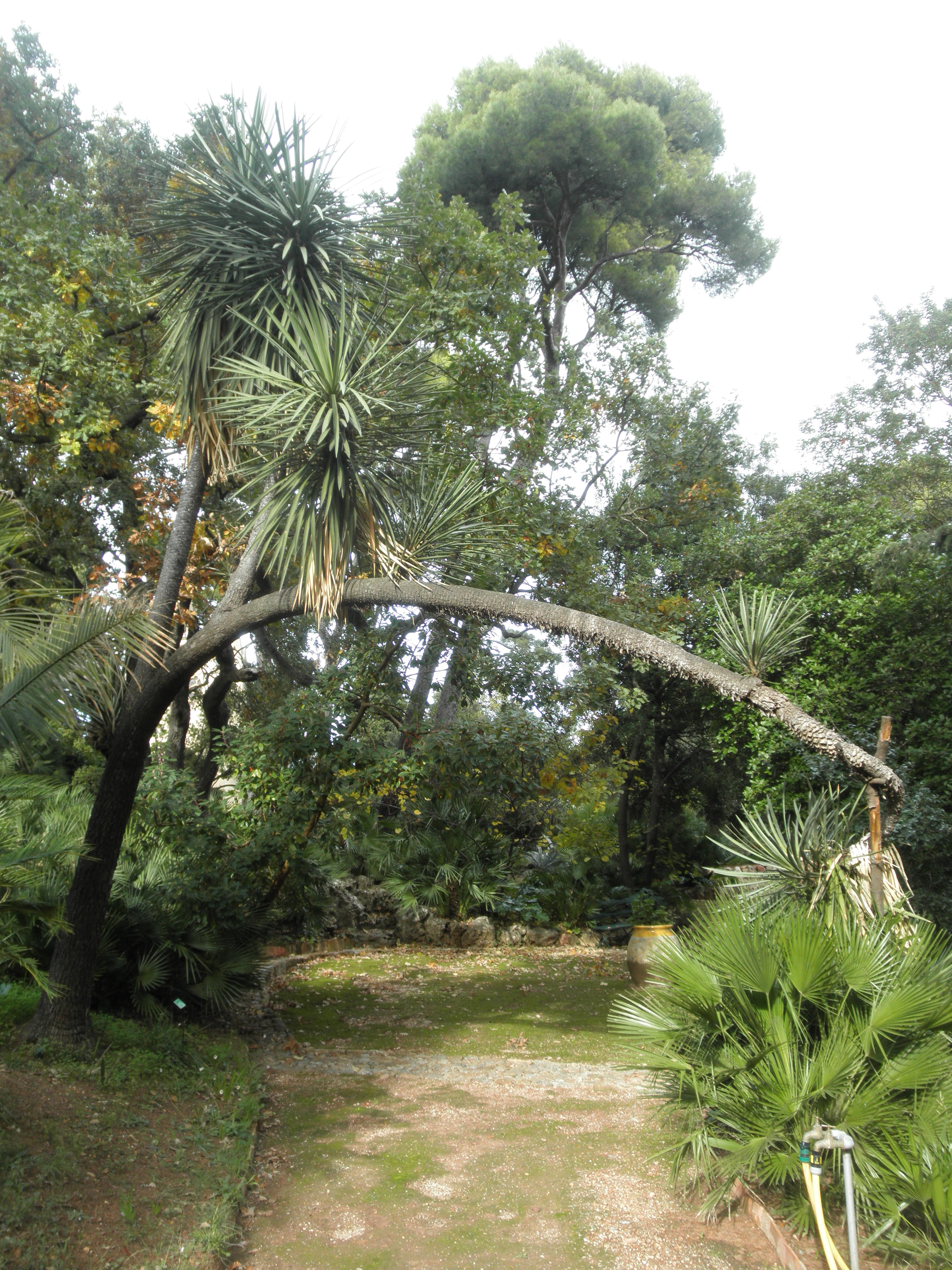
Century-old yucca filifera.

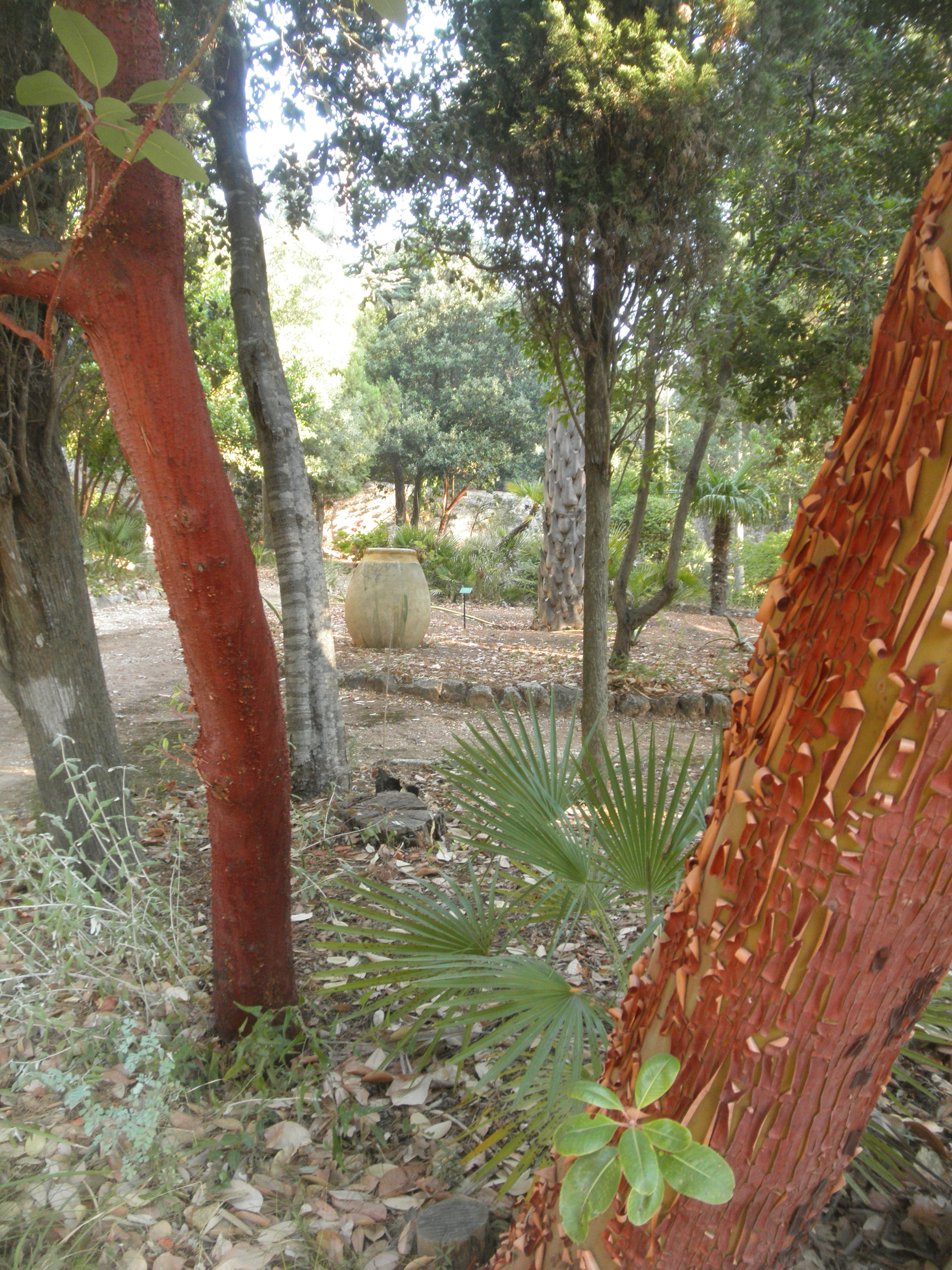
Exfoliating bark of Arbutus andrachne.

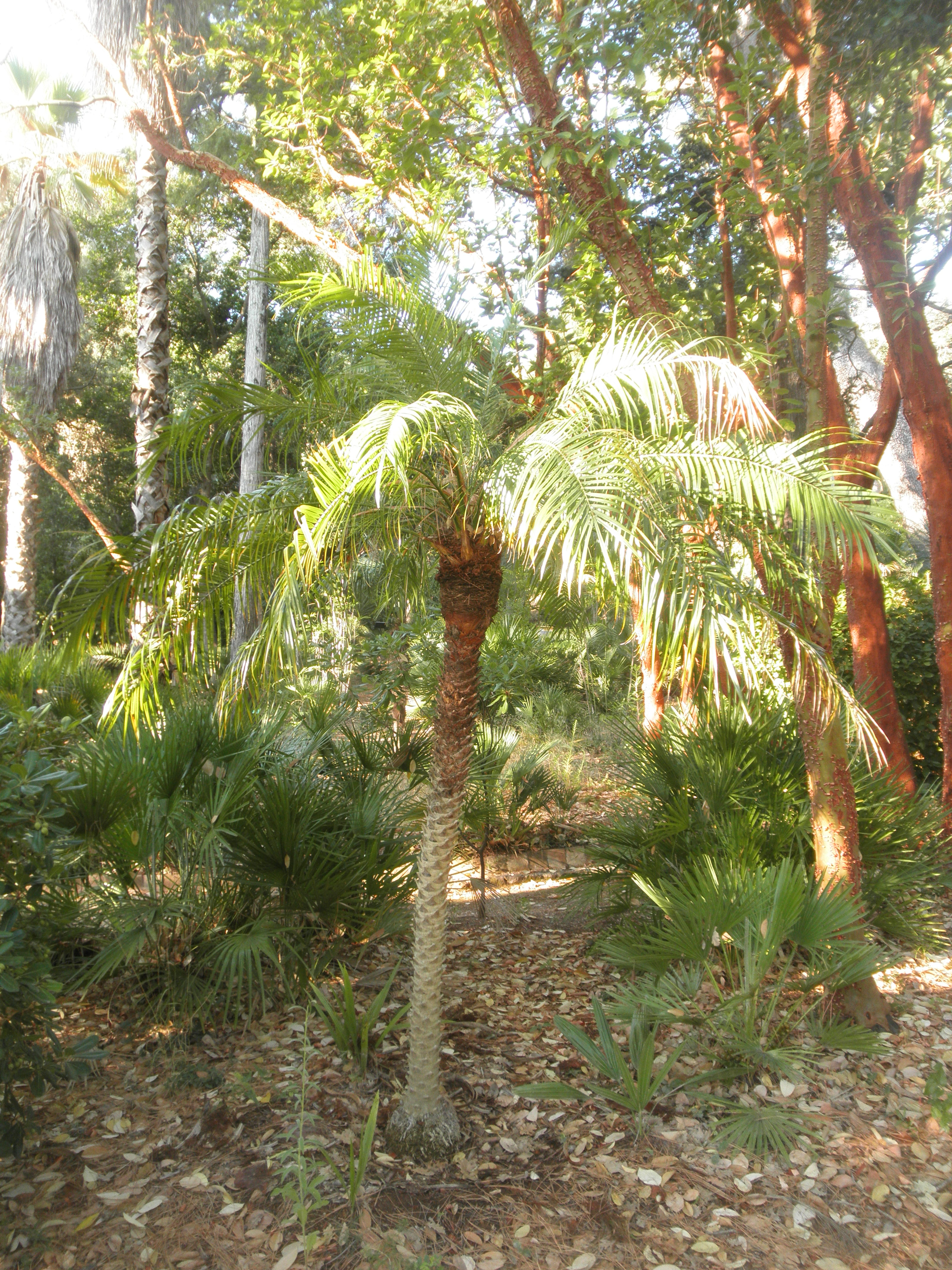
Phoenix roebelinii.

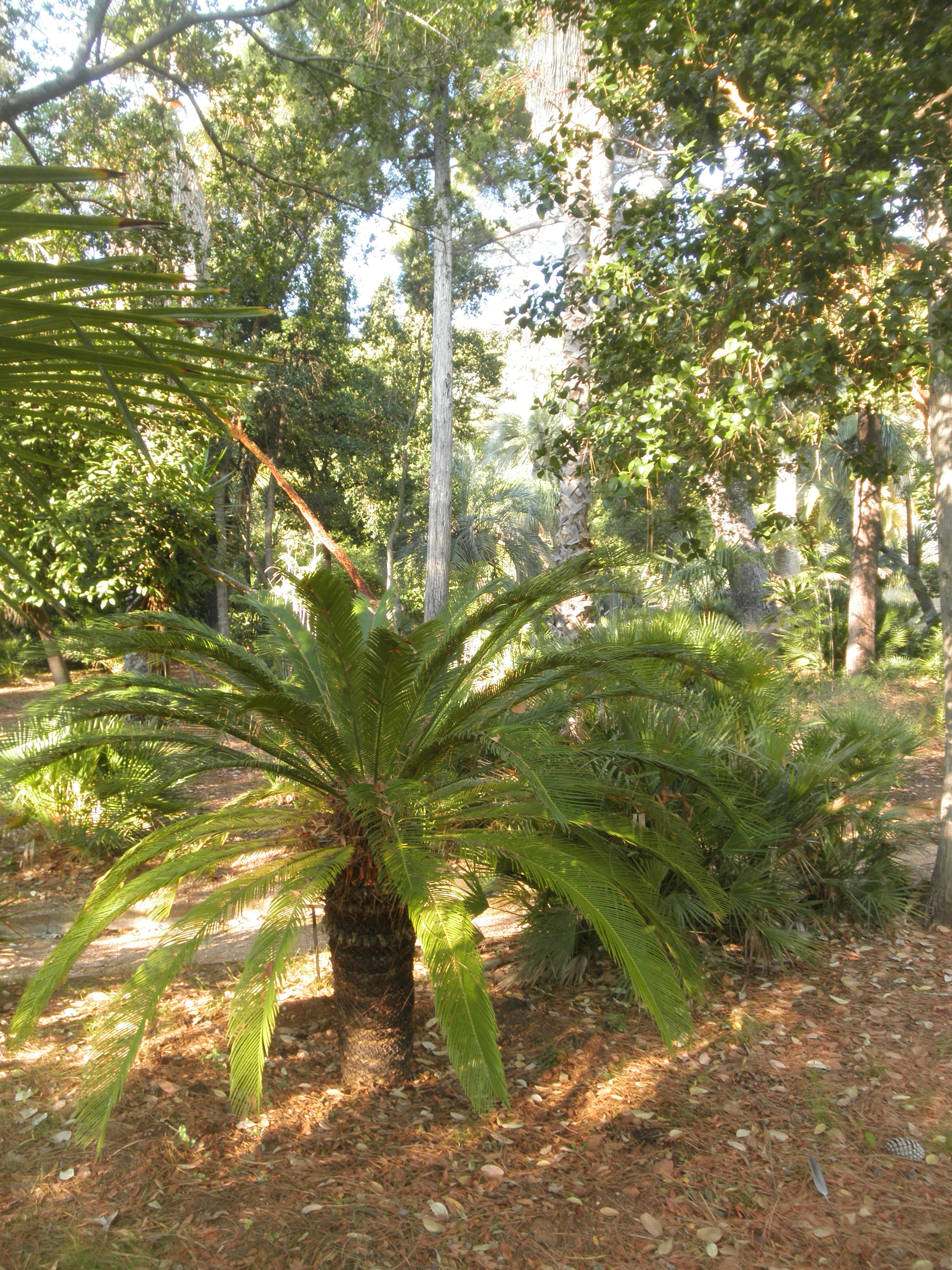
Cycas revoluta.

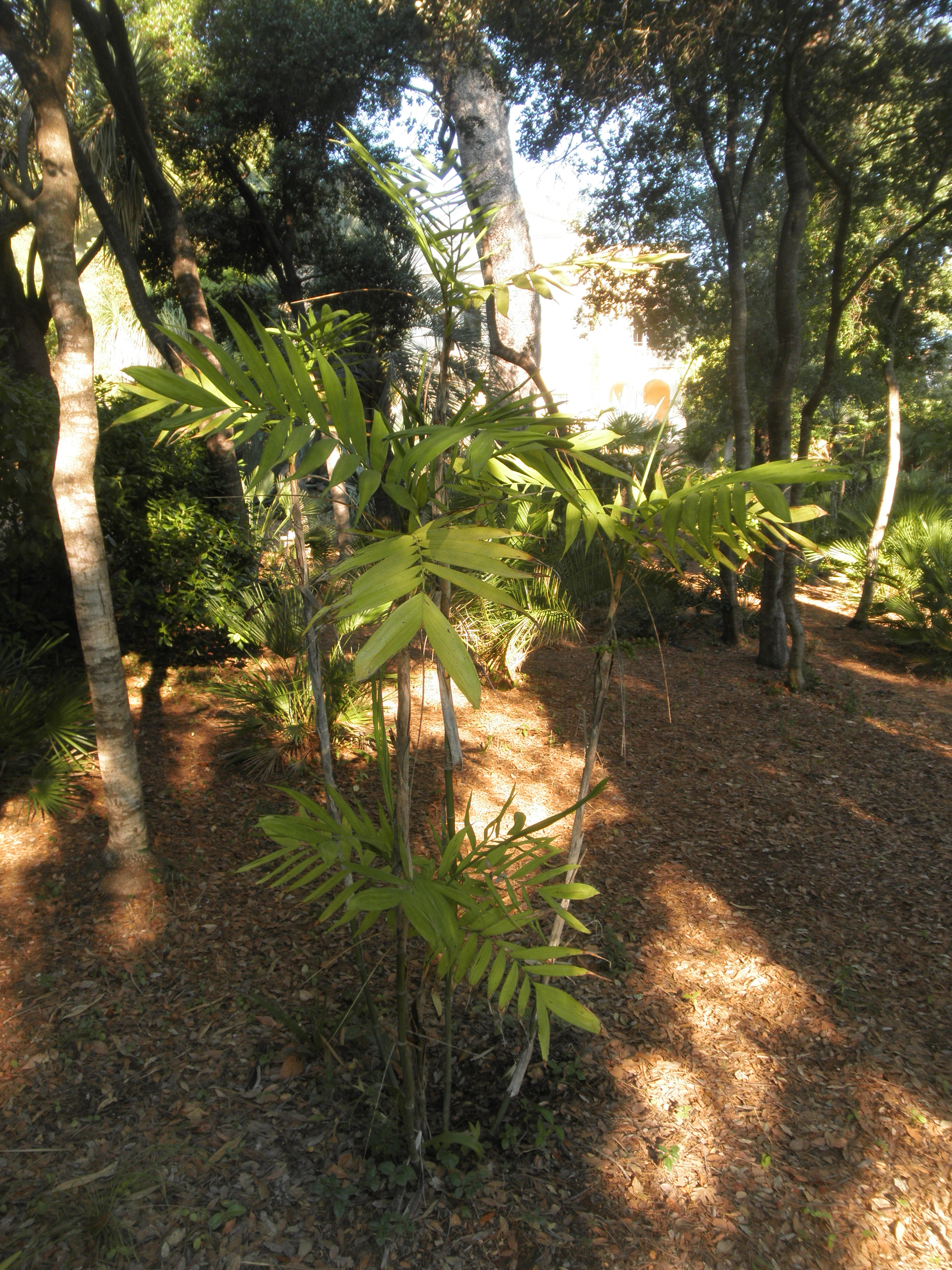
Chamaedorea microspadix.

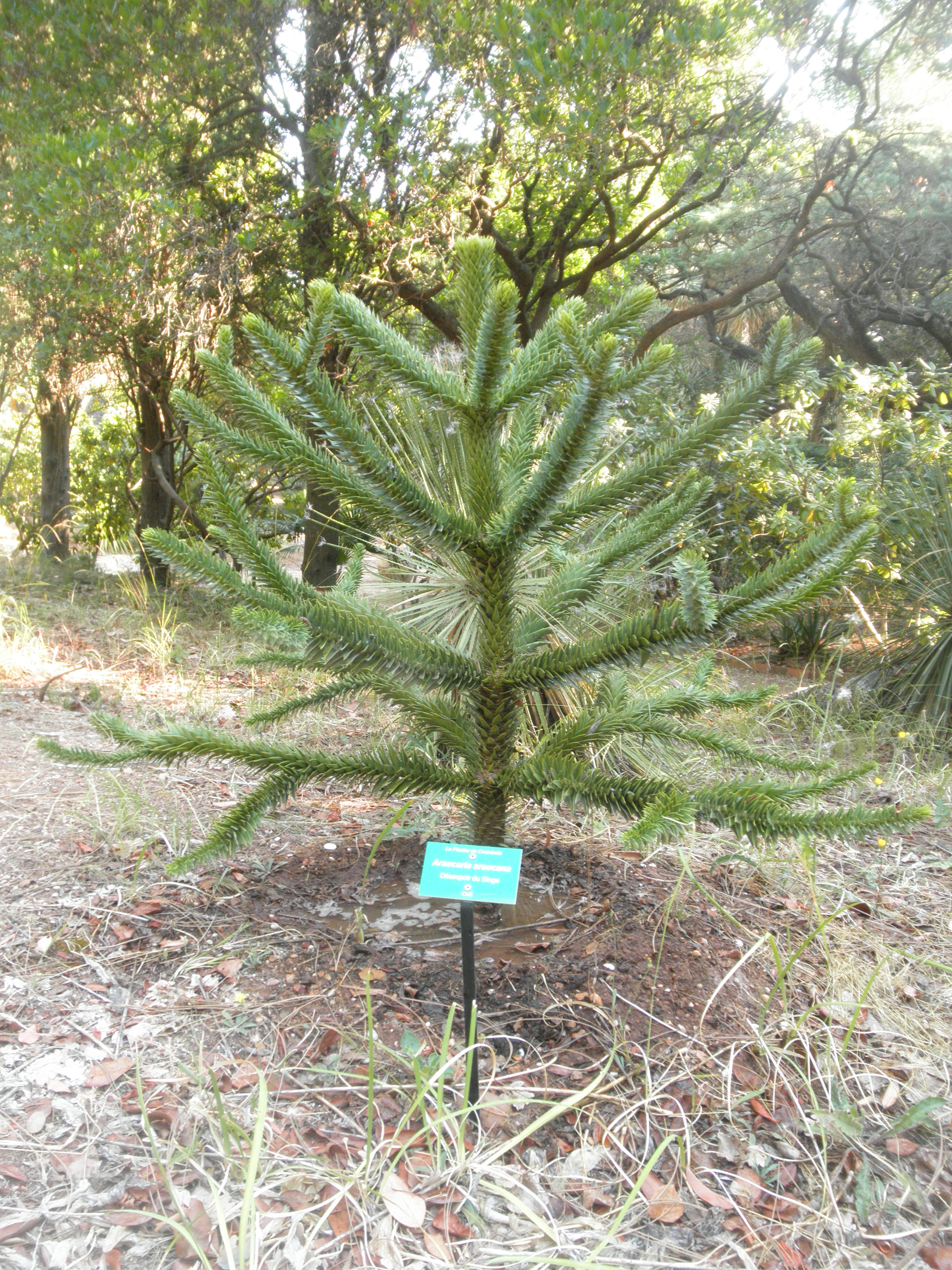
Araucaria araucana.

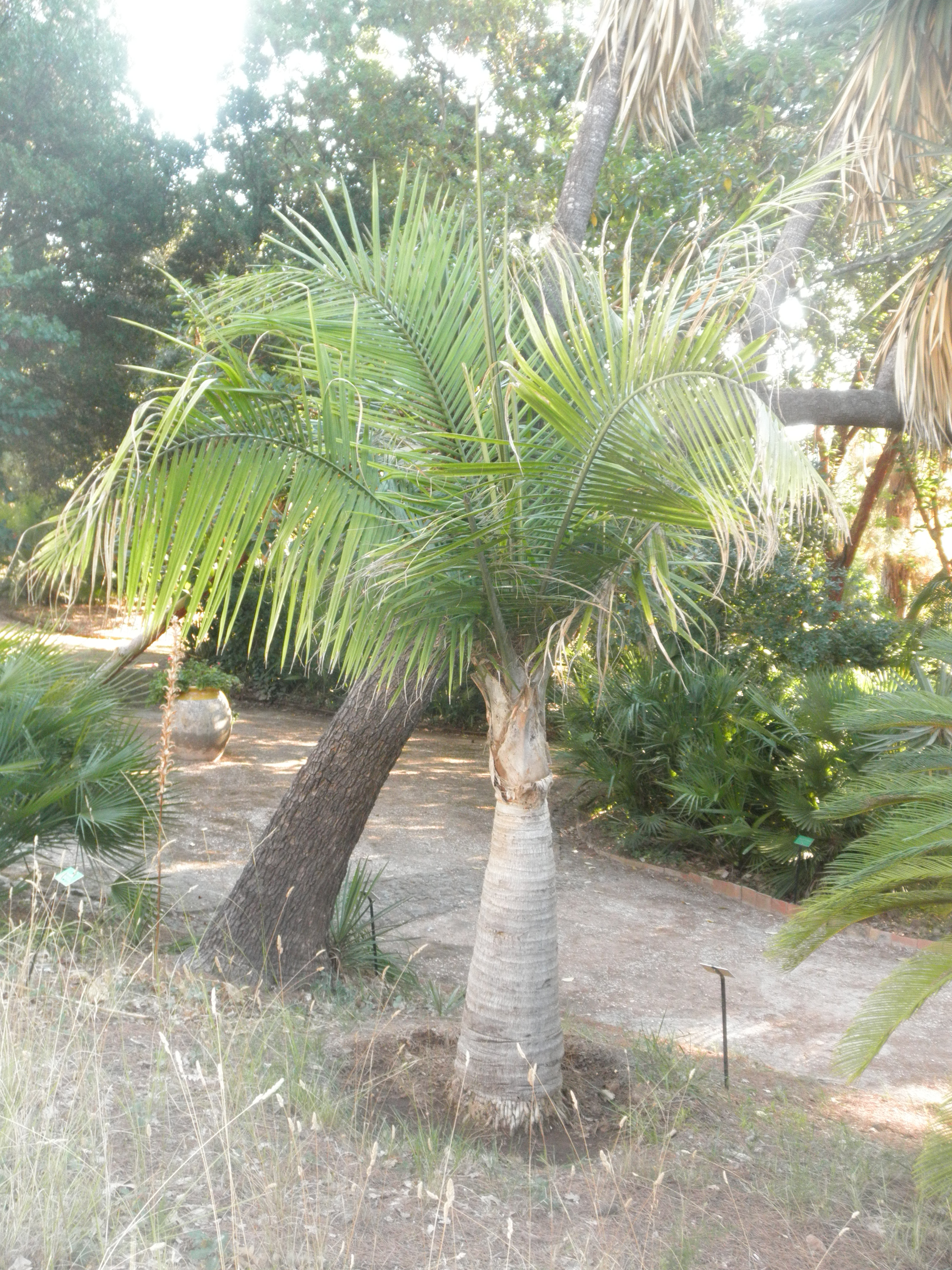
Ravenea rivularis.

=== Presence of "Rocaille" compositions in the park: The architecture of imitation ===
The term rocaille, a derivative of rococo, was first used in 1730.

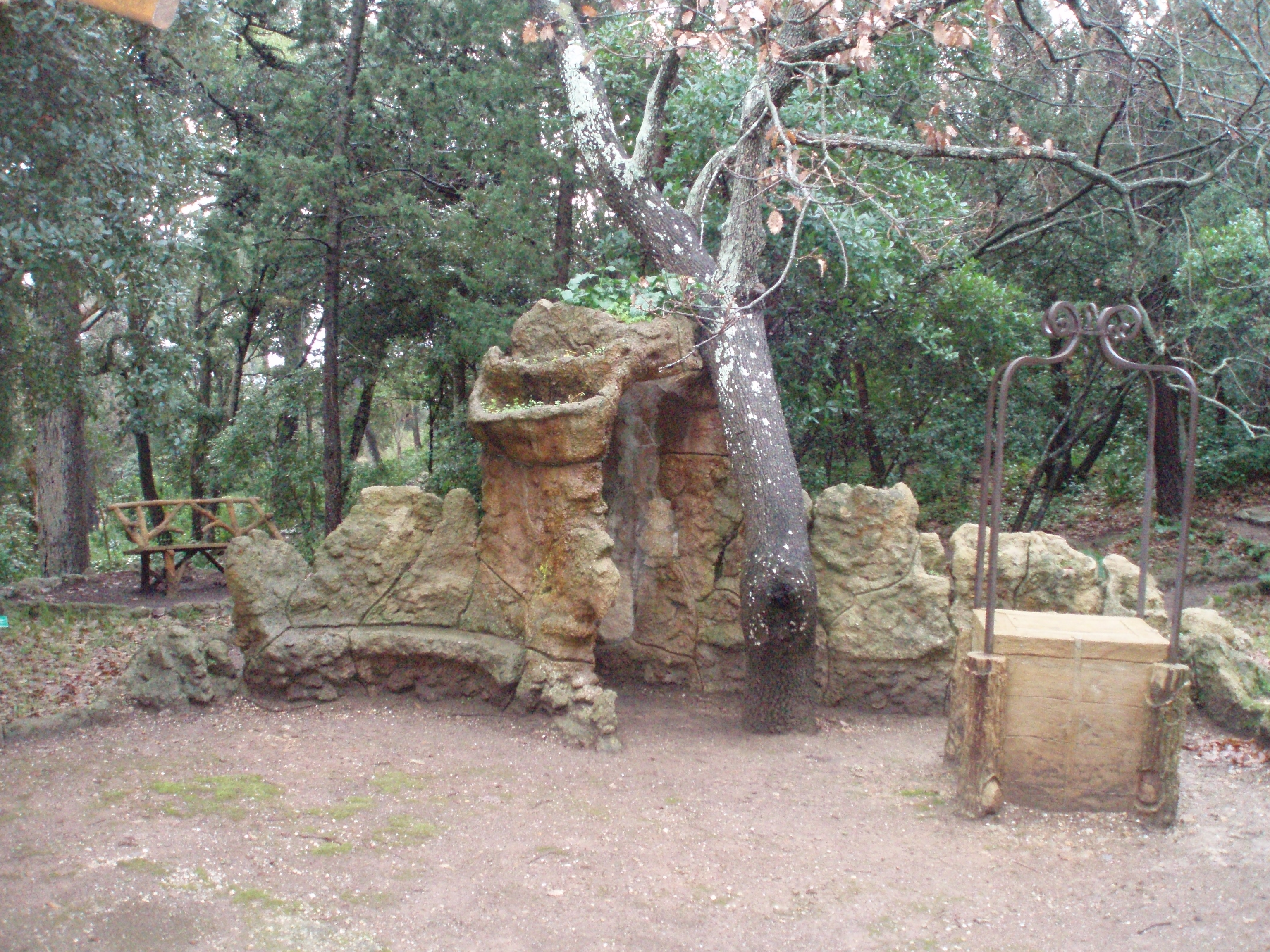
Rockery ensemble in the Plantier de Costebelle park (well, bench, arch).

Rocaille refers to a piece of mineral, stone, or pebbles with a twisted form, often combined with seashells to build artificial grottos and garden decorations. The cementier-rocailleur (rocaille cement artisan) creates grottos, benches, faux trees, or adorns wells. After laying down a bonding mortar for structural work, successive layers are shaped; the rocailleur then sculpts the elements in fresh cement using profile trowels, spatulas, or scalpels. The artisan may add whimsical details (like lizards, leaves, and others), giving life to a world of make-believe. The rocailleur is thus a sincere forger whose technique flourished in the 19th century.

The Plantier de Costebelle park features a rocaille ensemble comprising a bench, a faux tree, an arch, cement rocks, and a well, all restored in 2008 by one of the last remaining rocailleur artisans still practicing this decorative masonry trompe-l'œil art today. This ensemble should not be confused with another decorative element in the park, the antiquizing obelisk near the chapel, which more closely resembles a folly, a classical garden fabrique originally intended to mark the boundary between the ornamental garden and the orchard.

== Present day at the Plantier de Costebelle ==
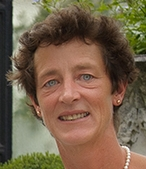
Susan Wissler, American director of Edith Wharton's home, The Mount, in Plantier in 2010.

The Plantier de Costebelle underwent renovation work partly under the supervision of the Architect of the Buildings of France between 2006 and 2013. The goal of these interventions was to restore the estate (protected building, chapel, and park) as it was originally conceived by Hortense de Prailly. Today, it is a private property partially open to the public by appointment only, within the framework of its Remarkable Garden label designation, and under conditions detailed on various referenced tourist websites or other guides and materials provided by tourism offices or distributed by the regional cultural affairs departments (DRACs).

=== A writer's house labeled "Maisons des Illustres" and member of the Federation of Writers' Houses ===
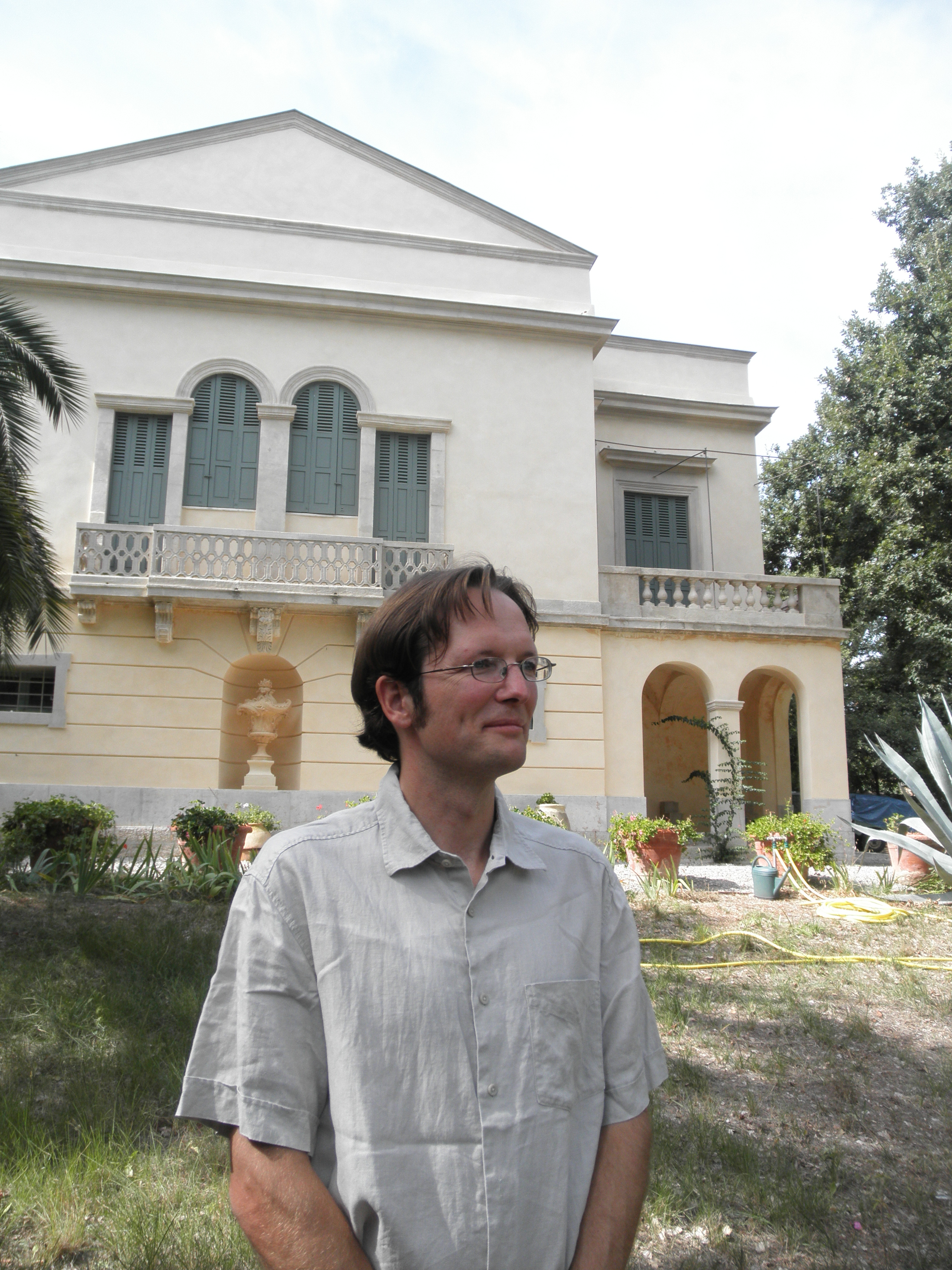
Richard Hibbitt, British academic, received at Le Plantier in 2010. (Note: Photo credit: The Plantier de Costebelle.)

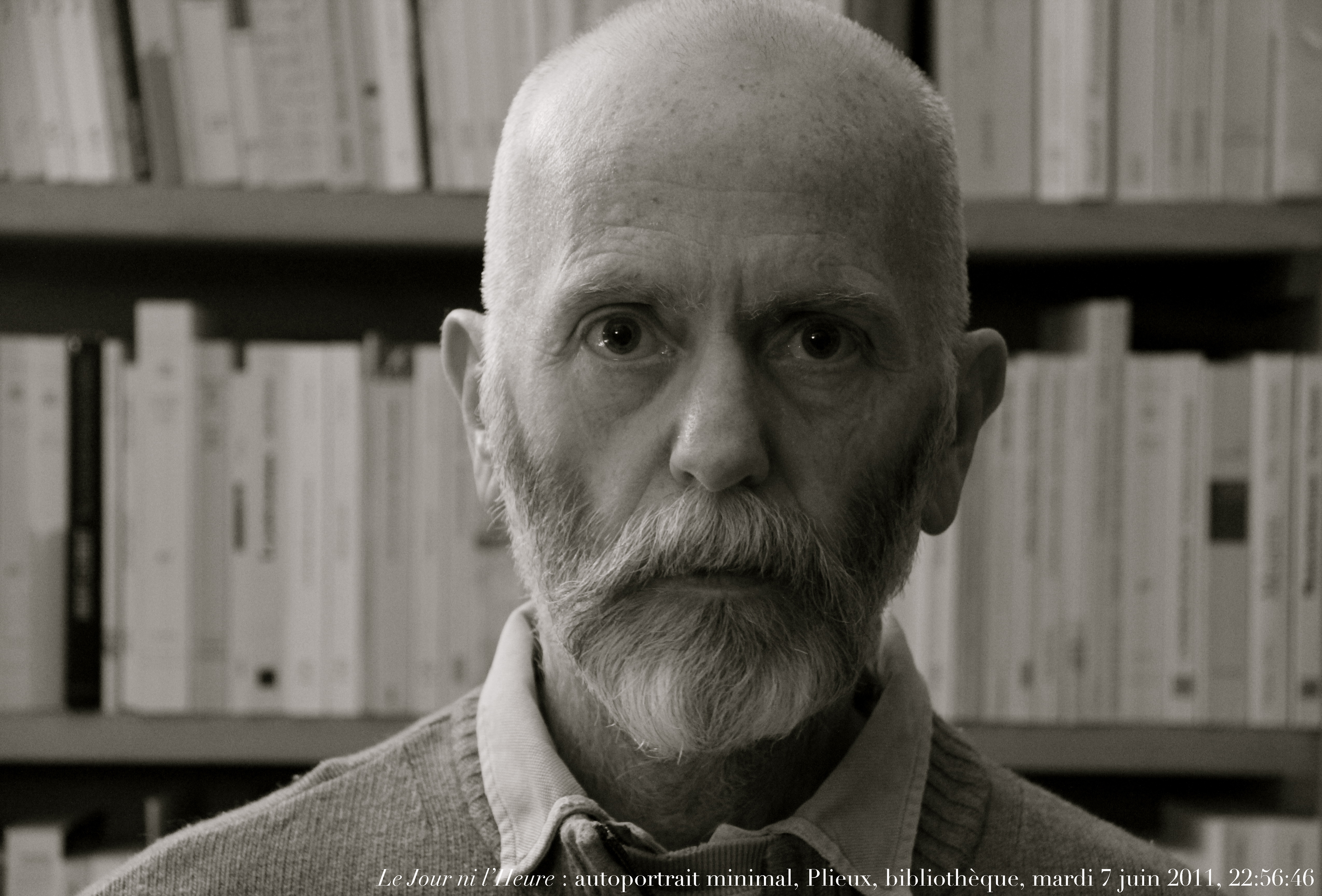
Renaud Camus, received at Le Plantier on May 7, 2011. (Note: The contemporary writer Renaud Camus was hosted at the Plantier de Costebelle in 2011, notably in preparation for his book Demeures de l'esprit, France IV Sud-Est, published by Fayard in 2012.)

The Plantier de Costebelle, labeled Maisons des Illustres since 2017, is a member of the Federation of Writers' Houses and Literary Heritage (Fédération des maisons d'écrivains et des patrimoines littéraires), an association founded on December 6, 1997, with the aim of uniting all literary sites: writers' houses (such as the House of Balzac, or the House of Chateaubriand), museums preserving literary collections (such as the Jean Racine Museum or the Marcel Proust Museum), or libraries housing literary archival holdings (such as the municipal library of Bourges or the University of Burgundy Library). The federation organizes literary events and disseminates information about sites and collections.

In this spirit of deepening literary knowledge, the Plantier de Costebelle provides researchers with access to the literary archives of writer Paul Bourget, including the manuscript of Le Roman des Quatre, co-written "four-handed" with Gérard d'Houville, Pierre Benoit, and Henri Duvernois; the first draft manuscript of Un cœur de femme (1890); the unpublished correspondence between the novelist and the Marquise d'Argenson, shedding new light on the genesis of his work Le Démon de midi; (Note: The recent rediscovery of Paul Bourget's correspondence with Isabelle d'Argenson was made possible thanks to the intervention of his descendant, the contemporary writer Robert de Goulaine, who died in 2010, and who agreed to hand over his collection of personal archives to the Plantier de Costebelle in 2007.) and the manuscripts of Notes Sociales and Du Beau Rôle (1920).

Examples of autograph manuscripts from the Paul Bourget collection available for consultation at Plantier de Costebelle

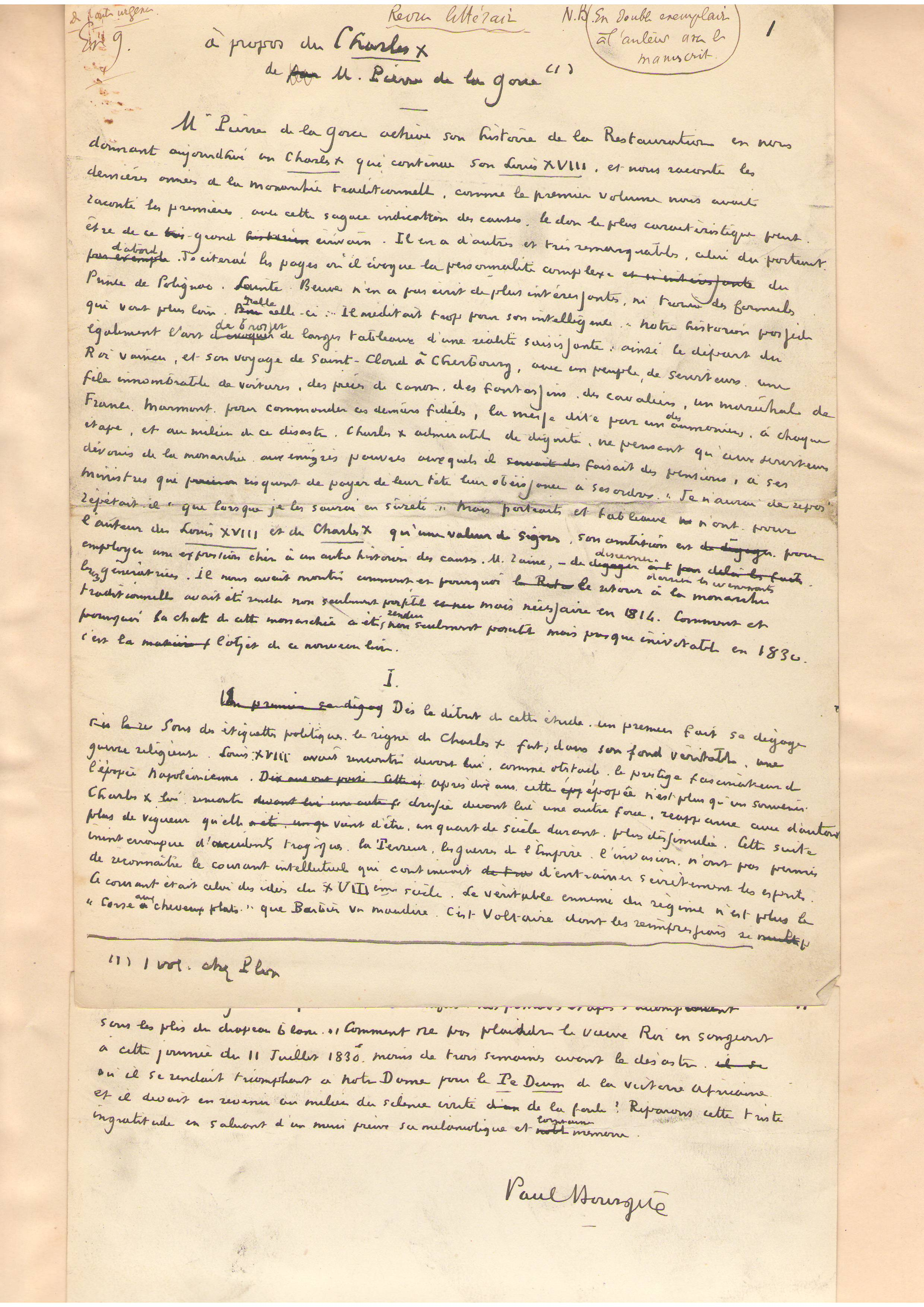
About Charles X by Pierre de La Gorce, volume II of La Restauration.

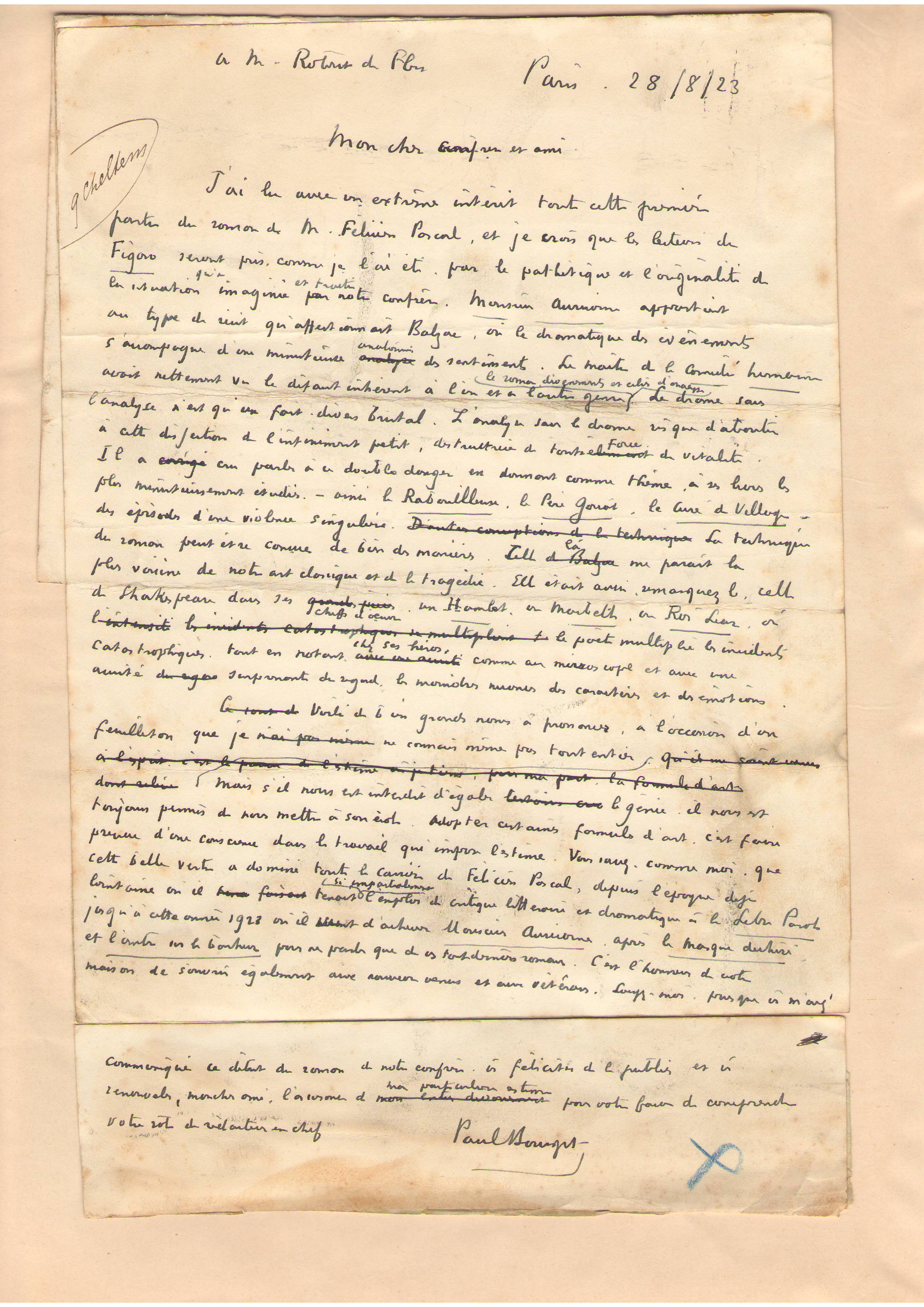
Handwritten letter to Robert de Flers about a novel by Félicien Pascal.

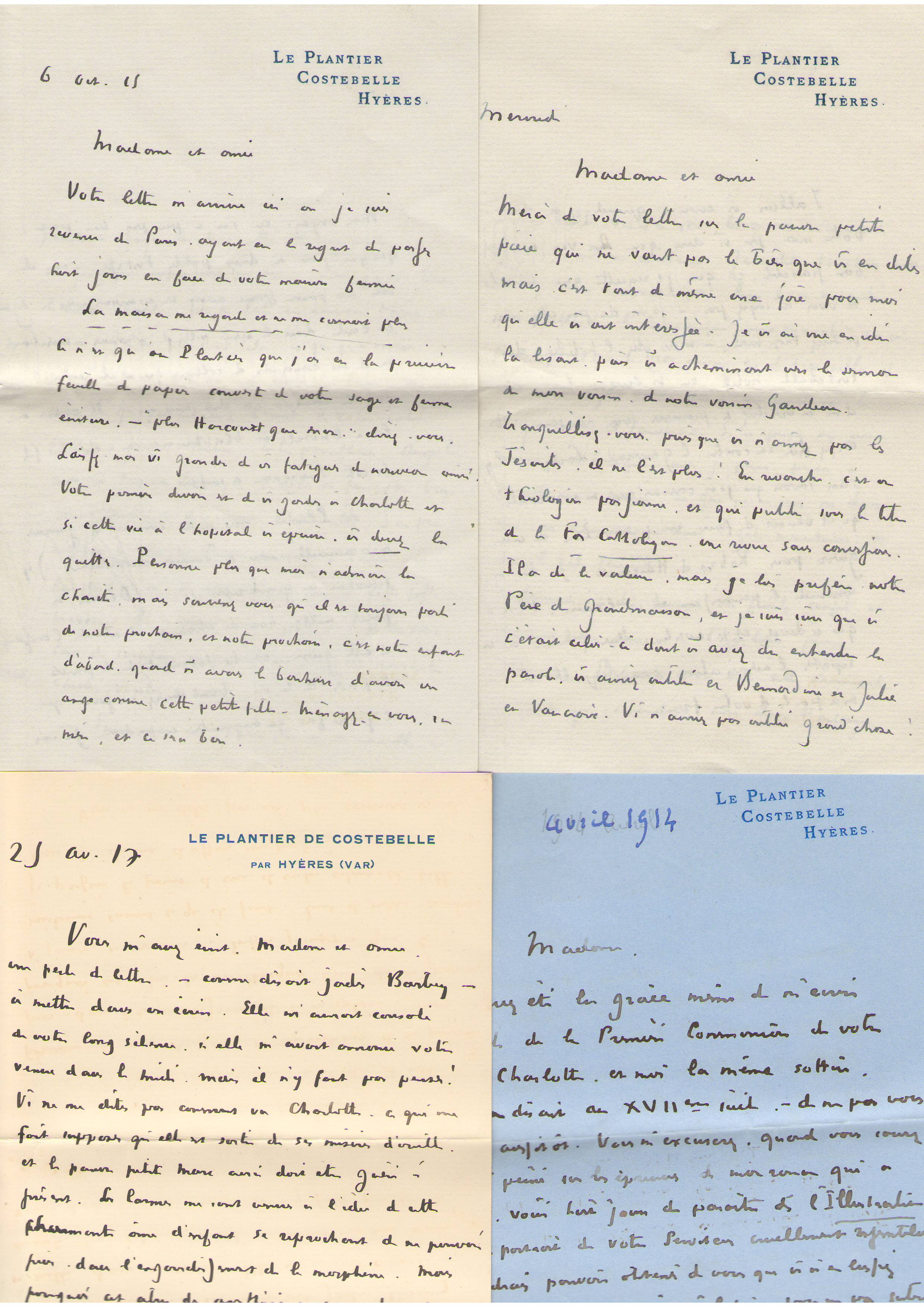
Letters to the Marquise d'Argenson written from Le Plantier de Costebelle.

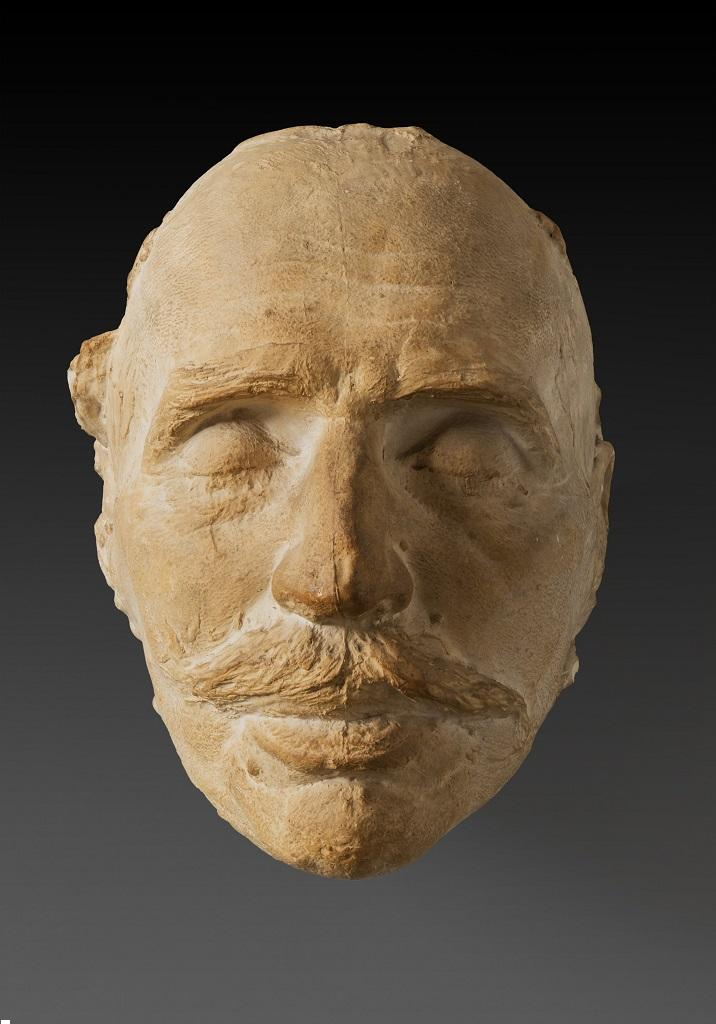
Death mask of Paul Bourget at Le Plantier de Costebelle.

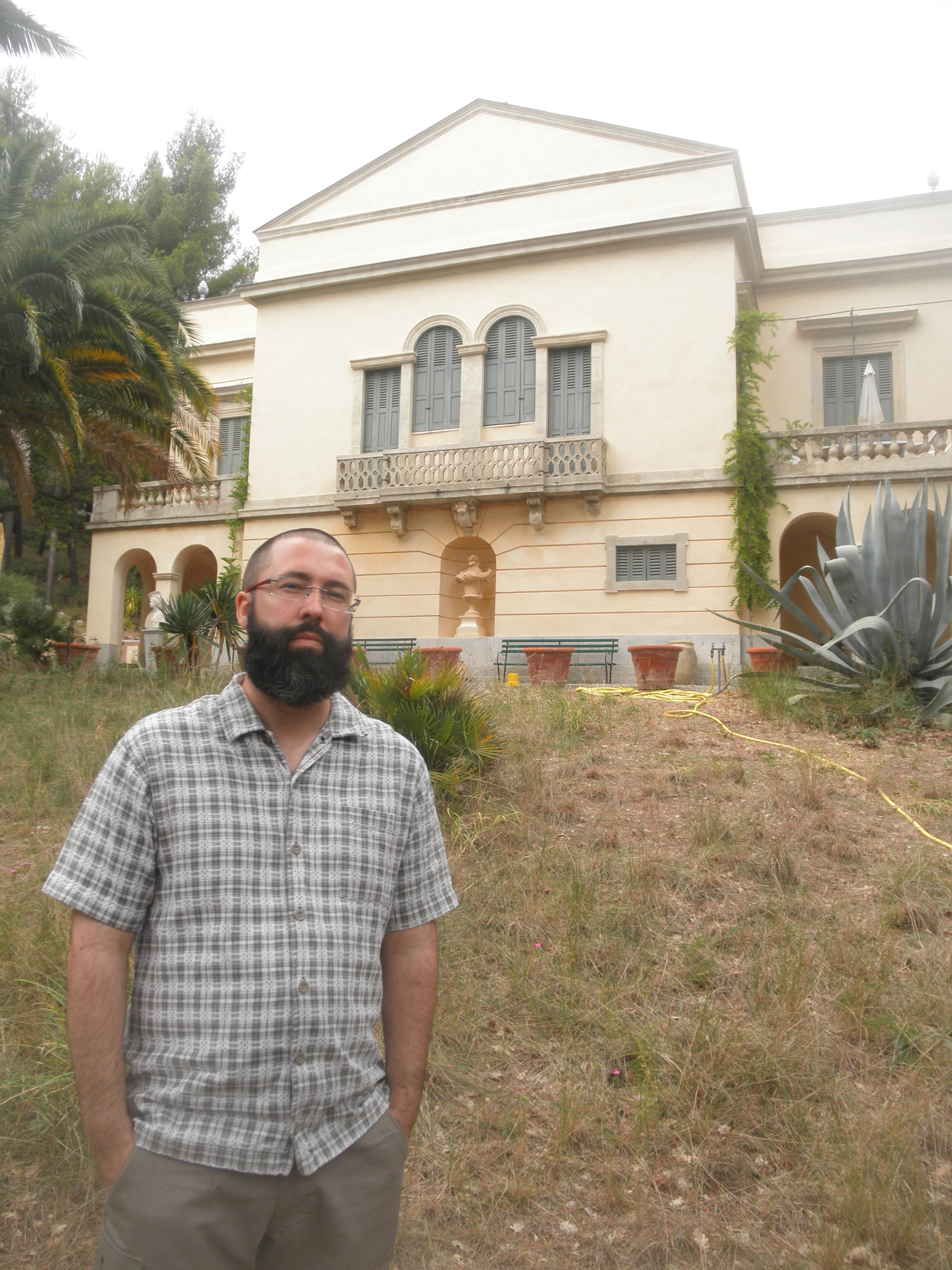
Grégory Bouak, certified teacher, literature researcher, member of CERLI, in 2014.

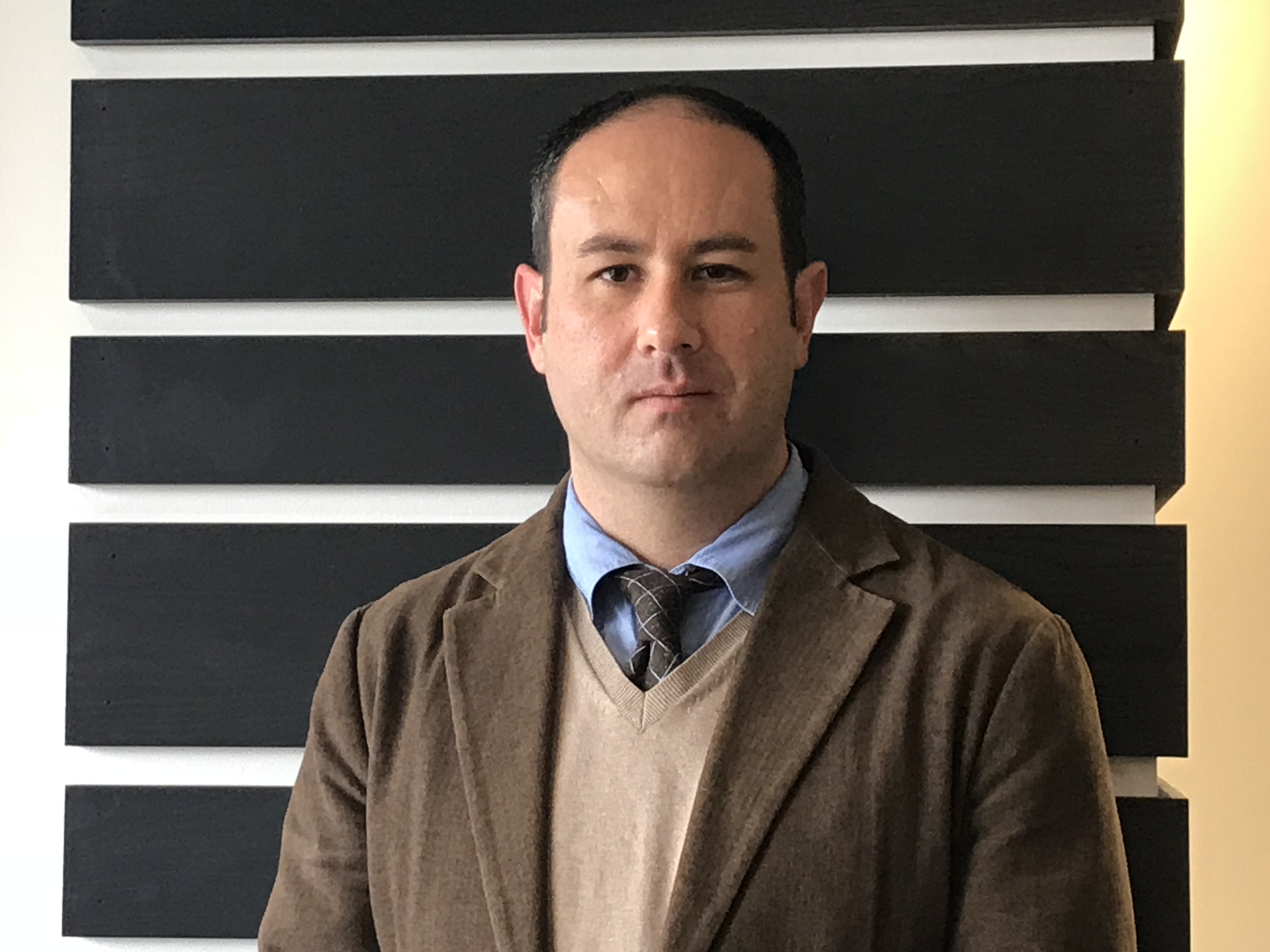
Daniel Ridge, Ph.D., American researcher, specializing in the early correspondence of P. Bourget, 2017.

The Collection of Autograph Manuscripts of Paul Bourget
Consultable upon written request at the Plantier de Costebelle. This list, non-exhaustive, does not include photographs, objects, and personal mementos of the novelist.
- Le Roman des quatre, autograph manuscript of 259 leaves, octavo and quarto, first draft, containing numerous corrections and erasures, fully complete, on papers of various colors.
- Un cœur de femme, original autograph manuscript, first draft, 280 pages with numerous sketches of characters.
- 48 letters from Pierre Loti to the Marquise d'Argenson (provenance: Robert de Goulaine).
- 30 autograph letters from Paul Bourget (provenance: Robert de Goulaine).
- Candidacy of the Marquis d'Argenson for the Académie française, Paul Bourget's file, handwritten notes from numerous Men of Letters and responses from academicians (Hermant, Bédier, Poincaré, Foch, Duke de La Force, Baudrillart, Bazin, Jullian, La Gorce, Lavedan, etc.) (provenance: Robert de Goulaine).
- Rare letters from Minnie Bourget (provenance: Robert de Goulaine).
- 17 letters from François Mauriac, 5 letters from Robert Chauvelot, 6 letters from Hélène Vacaresco, 6 letters from Gaëtan Bernoville, and 9 letters from Louis Gillet (provenance: Robert de Goulaine).
- Letters from Paul Bourget to Sully Prudhomme and to Louis Desprez.
- Proofs with autograph corrections of various works by Paul Bourget: Cruelle énigme and Physiologie de l'amour moderne.
- Autograph correspondence of Paul Bourget, 60 letters (Francis Carco, Alexandre Dumas fils, Gabriel Hanotaux, etc.).
- Letters from the Marquise d'Argenson to Paul Bourget (provenance: Robert de Goulaine).
- Autograph manuscript of Le Beau rôle (1920), this short novel appearing in the collection Conflits intimes in 1925.
- Signed autograph manuscript (1888–1889) for the preface to Benjamin Constant's Adolphe, published by Librairie Conquet in 1889.
- Autograph manuscript of Beau Soir, poem.
- Le Disciple, author's copy with draft fragments of the manuscript and a letter to Félicien Champsaur.
- Autograph manuscript À propos du Charles X de M. Pierre de La Gorce (10 pages).
- Autograph correspondence to Félix Jeantet, director of La Revue hebdomadaire, and to Lucien Descaves.
- 4 letters from Philippe Chabaneix, 1 letter from Madame Alphonse Daudet, 3 letters from Gabriel-Louis Pringué, 1 letter from Tristan Derême, 2 letters from Pierre Benoit, 1 letter from Francis Jammes.
- Collection of rare photographs in series of Paul Bourget in the literary salon of Madame d'Argenson, while working on Le Démon de midi.
- About one hundred press clippings announcing the death of Paul Bourget, including commentaries and writers' articles.
- 30 letters from Paul Bourget from May 1917 to October 1921.
- Letters from Paul Bourget to Pierre Loti, Charles Derennes, Marcel Fouquier, Octave Mirbeau.
- Literary contracts between Paul Bourget and Charles Torquet, 1911; Charles Delac, 1913; J. Coquelin, 1911.
- Autograph manuscript of Notes sociales ("On the New University," "The Testimony of a Soldier," "The True Meaning of a Word," "The Ends of a Regime," etc.).
- Manuscripts and literary proofs of Paul Bourget from 1928 to 1932.
- 13 signed autograph letters from Maurice Barrès to Paul Bourget from 1892 to 1923, literary and political correspondence.
- Manuscript by the anarchist Dreyfusard Bernard Lazare denouncing Paul Bourget.
- 2 letters from Paul Bourget to Guy de Maupassant.
- Claude Debussy, Paysage sentimental.
- Critique by Catulle Mendès of the play L'Émigré (signed autograph manuscript, 1908).
- Signed autograph manuscript, Le Reliquaire, a youthful poem of 150 verses, included in Poésies, 1872–1876.

=== A botanical park designated a "remarkable garden" ===
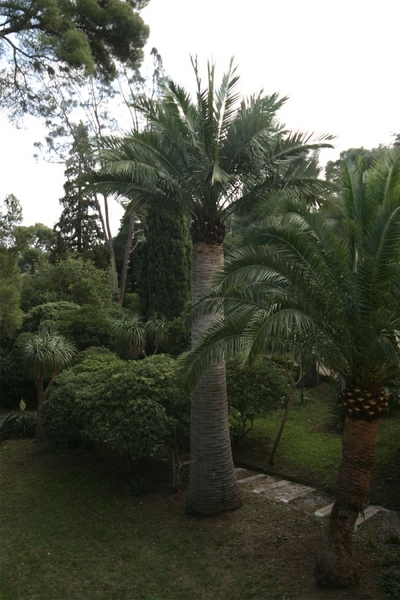
Jubaea chilensis planted after 1863 by the Baroness de Prailly in the Plantier de Costebelle park.

==== Legal regulations ====
Since November 2009, the botanical park of the Plantier de Costebelle has been designated a "Remarkable Garden" by the French Ministry of Culture. It is the only privately owned park in Hyères to bear this label, alongside three public spaces: Olbius Riquier Park, Saint-Bernard Park, and Sainte-Claire Park. This State label, created in 2004, aims to recognize and promote parks and gardens—whether public (such as the Domaine du Rayol or Villa Ephrussi de Rothschild) or private (such as the Parc du Moulin Blanc or the Jardins d'Albertas)—that are open to visitors and present a proven botanical interest. The label, awarded for five years, is renewable and revocable and is granted by the regional prefect following a favorable opinion from a commission chaired by the Regional Director of Cultural Affairs.

Since the granting of this label requires the park to be open to the public for 40 days a year, the Plantier de Costebelle opens its botanical park for visits from April to July and in September, by appointment only, and exclusively as paid guided tours. The property also takes part in two annual national events: Rendez-vous aux Jardins (the first weekend of June) and European Heritage Days (the third weekend of September). In both cases, public access is granted by right, without the need for a prior appointment, although an entrance fee is still charged.

Each year, by February 1st, a declaration of opening must be submitted to the Regional Tourism Delegate. This document specifies the conditions under which the private property is open to the public and allows various regional and departmental institutional bodies (such as the Departmental Tourism Committee) to include the site in their tourist materials. Compliance with these rules made it possible until 2014 to obtain a tax approval authorizing a special regime for deducting maintenance costs of the buildings and the park.

==== Specific maintenance conditions ====
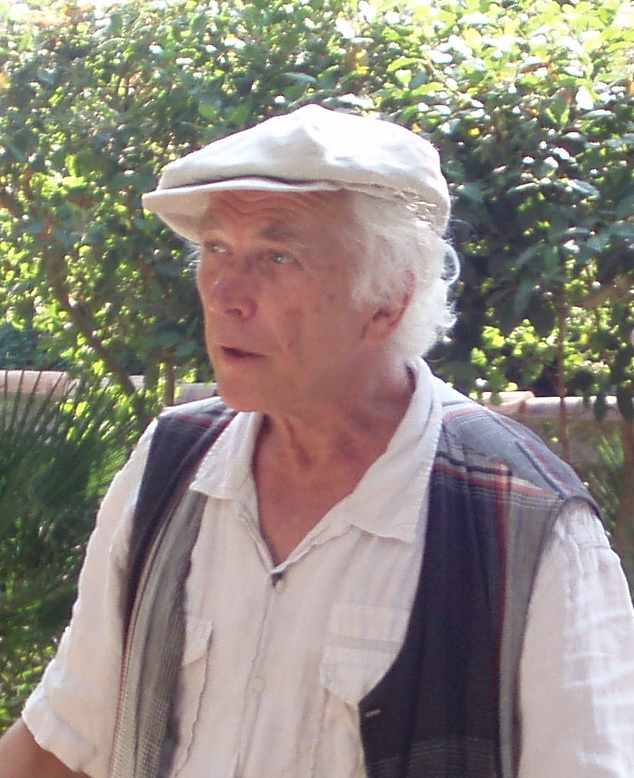
Michel Racine in 2009 at Le Plantier to catalog plants. (Note: Michel Racine is a landscape architect, urban planner and architect, a member of the Versailles National School of Landscape Architecture since 1989. In 1992, he organized the public opening of the King's Kitchen Garden in Versailles. He is France's expert member at the ICOMOS-IFLA International Committee on Cultural Landscapes.)

Since the maintenance of the park is one of the key elements in the granting of the label, a management plan for such labeled spaces must be in place. This mandatory planning document is a tool for technical monitoring (clear-cutting, replanting of pre-grown specimens), (Note: Technical follow-up in accordance with the principles defined in the Florence Charter, which systematizes the notion of the "historic garden" (ICOMOS - IFLA, December 15, 1982).) scientific monitoring (for example, taxon or cultivar inventory), sanitary surveillance (especially of palm trees to prevent invasive pests such as the red palm weevil), and economic planning (budget forecasts) of the garden.

Plants and trees in the Plantier garden grow freely to promote acclimatization, without the use of any phytosanitary treatments. The natural shapes of trees are respected, and the limited pruning activities aim only to ensure visitor safety and clear paths. Watering is done manually using the source of the Virgin spring; this irrigation is reserved for the first years after planting to help palms and other plants establish themselves. There are no manicured lawns, but instead, changeable meadows bloom in spring and autumn and dry out in the summer, appearing in many parts of the garden. Wild grasses provide ground cover that effectively protects the soil from erosion. These are maintained in such a way as to allow seed reproduction (with late spring mowing).

=== Recognized historic monument ===
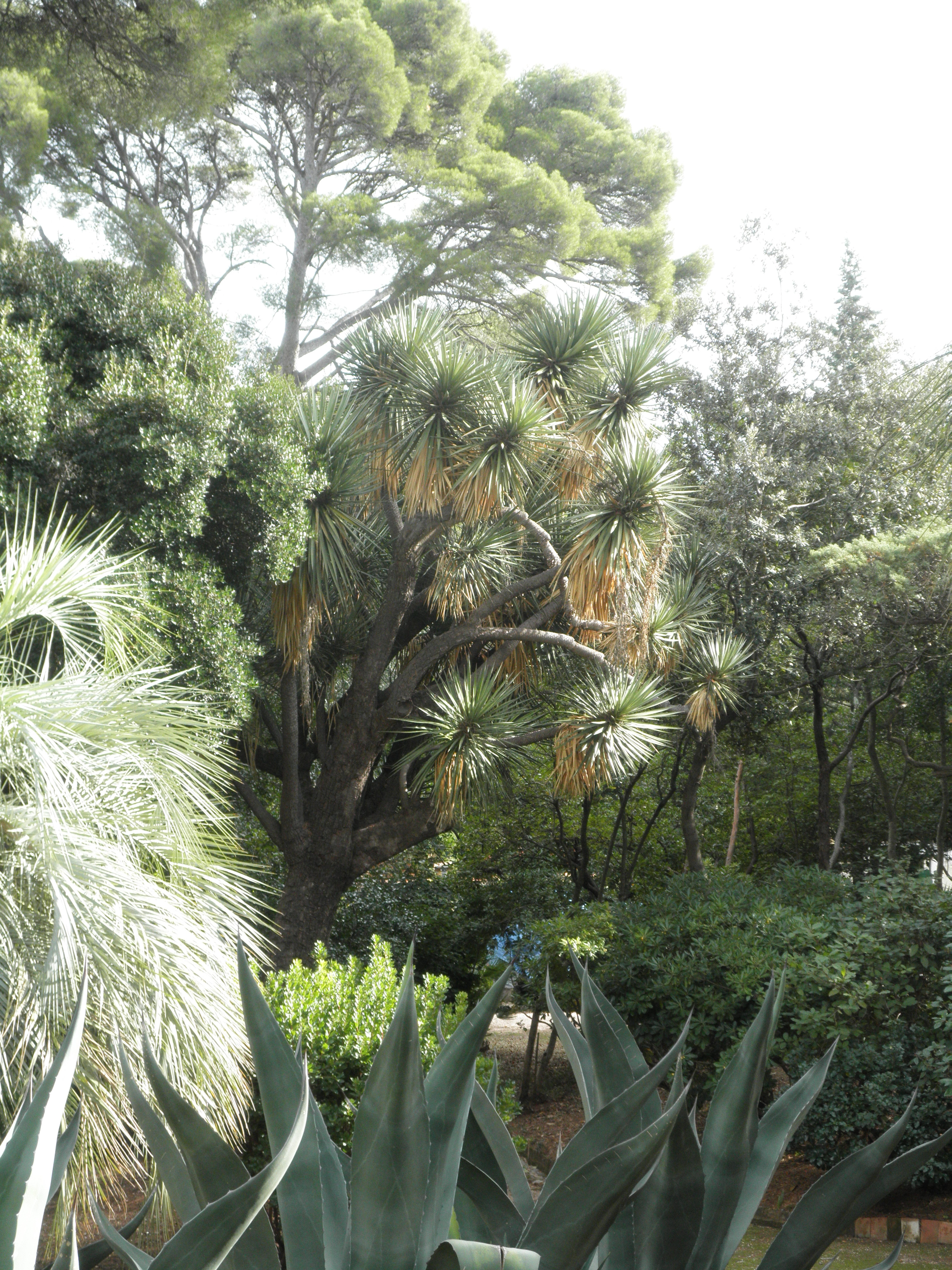
Yucca filifera (center) at the origin of the taxon's description by botanist J.B. Chabaud in 1876.

The Plantier de Costebelle property has been listed in the supplementary inventory of Historic Monuments (facades and roofs) since a decree dated December 26, 1976. It belongs to several networks and institutional partners dedicated to preserving and promoting French cultural and architectural heritage. These organizations, through associations recognized by public authorities, assist private owners with legal, technical, and financial support, and reward heritage restoration programs through various prizes.

Among the associations of which the Plantier de Costebelle is a member are:

- Vieilles Maisons Françaises, recognized as a public utility and founded in 1958 by the Marquise de Amodio, is dedicated to the preservation and enhancement of built and landscaped heritage and to developing funding methods for heritage.
- La Demeure Historique, since its founding in 1924 by Dr. Joachim Carvallo and Boni de Castellane, offers its 80 years of expertise to help manage private historic monuments.
- Parcs et Jardins de Provence-Alpes-Côte d'Azur supports national actions for the preservation and development of remarkable parks and gardens and represents park and garden managers before regional, national, and international administrations. This association is notably present on the regional commission responsible for awarding the Remarkable Garden label.

== See also ==
- Paul Bourget
- The Disciple (novel)
- Eugène Chevandier de Valdrôme

== Bibliography ==
- Bordeaux, Henry; Barrès, Maurice; Maurras, Charles; Derème, Tristan; Jaloux, Edmond; Duvernois, Henri; Vaudoyer, Jean-Louis; Carco, Francis; de Flers, Robert; Marsan, Eugène; de Nolhac, Pierre (1923). "Le Jubilé de Paul Bourget" [Paul Bourget's Jubilee]. La Revue Hebdomadaire (in French) (50). Paris: Plon: 259 et seq.
- Corpéchot, Lucien (1936). Souvenir d'un journaliste, Barrès et Bourget [Memories of a journalist, Barrès and Bourget] (in French). Paris: éditions Plon. LCCN 36035369.
- Roux, Gustave (1952). Hyères, une vieille station d'hiver et Paul Bourget, son mainteneur [Hyères, an old winter resort, and Paul Bourget, its caretaker] (in French). édition de la Ville de Hyères.
- Clotis, Joseph; Daille, Général; Bauër, Gérard (1952). Commémoration de la naissance de Paul Bourget [Commemoration of the birth of Paul Bourget] (in French). édition de la Ville de Hyères.
- Bordeaux, Henry (1954). Reconstructeurs et mainteneurs [Reconstructors and maintainers] (in French). Paris: Éditions Plon.
  - In this work, Henry Bordeaux evokes the memory of Catholic writers and thinkers who upheld Tradition. In addition to Bourget, he examines Balzac, Lemaitre, Barrès, Mâle, Maurras, Grousset, Bazin Carrel, and Saint-Exupéry.
- Cadilhac, Paul-Émile; Coiplet, Robert (1955). Demeures inspirées et sites romanesques II [Inspired residences and romantic sites II] (in French). Paris: Éditions de l'Illustration. pp. 335 et seq.
  - This illustrated book lists the homes of French writers. Numerous photographs accompany the text, allowing readers to discover the places and everyday worlds where writers and men of letters lived. The age of the book (1955) makes these literary reports even more interesting, revealing the workrooms, manuscripts, and gardens surrounding these inspiring residences.
- Gistucci, Marie-Gracieuse Martin (1985). Paul Bourget et l'Italie [Paul Bourget and Italy] (in French). Geneva, Paris: Éditions Slatkine. ISBN 2-05-100693-8. OCLC 416550138.
- de Botton, Judith; Boucher de Lapparent, Denise (1987). Le retable de la Trinité [The Trinity Altarpiece] (in French). Édition du Musée de Chambéry. ISSN 0294-6858.
- de Botton, Judith; Boucher de Lapparent, Denise (1988). "Le Retable de la Trinité de Bartolo di Fredi à Chambéry" [Bartolo di Fredi's Trinity Altarpiece in Chambéry]. La Revue du Louvre (in French) (3). ISSN 0035-2608.
- Daille, Amiral (1989). "Paul Bourget et Hyères" [Paul Bourget and Hyères]. Bulletin de l'académie du Var (in French). Édition de l'Académie du Var: 51 et seq. ISSN 0035-2608.
- Robertson – Proschowsky, A; Roster, G; Chabaud, J. B (1998). La résistance au froid des palmiers [The cold resistance of palm trees] (in French). Marly-le-Roi: Champflour. ISBN 2-87655-039-3.
- Arthaud, C; Paul, E. L (1999). La Côte d'Azur des écrivains [The French Riviera of Writers] (in French). Aix-en-Provence: Édisud. pp. 95–96.
- Jacquemin, Odile (1999). Une ville en Images, Hyères-les-Palmiers [A City in Pictures, Hyères-les-Palmiers] (in French). Mémoire à lire, territoire à l'écoute. ISBN 2-912433-10-X.
- Fray, François; Négrel, Geneviève (2000). Hyères, Var. L'Inventaire (in French). Images du patrimoine. ISBN 2-909727-03-3.
- Boyer, Marc (2002). L'Invention de la Côte d'Azur [The Invention of the French Riviera] (in French). Paris: Éditions de l'Aube. pp. 73, 74 & 82, 83.
- Racine, Michel (2007). Guide des jardins en France, Sud [Guide to Gardens in France, South] (in French). Paris: Éditions Ulmer. ISBN 978-2-84138-301-6.
- Sagaert, Martine (2010). Balade dans le Var, sur les pas des écrivains [A stroll through the Var region, following in the footsteps of writers] (in French). Paris: éditions Alexandrines. ISBN 978-2-912319-44-9.
- Camus, Renaud (2012). Demeures de l'esprit [Dwellings of the spirit] (in French). Vol. IV : France, chapitre 8. Paris: Fayard. pp. 117–133. ISBN 978-2-213-66204-6.
