= Rama Ayalon =

Israeli French-to-Hebrew translator

- רמה איילון
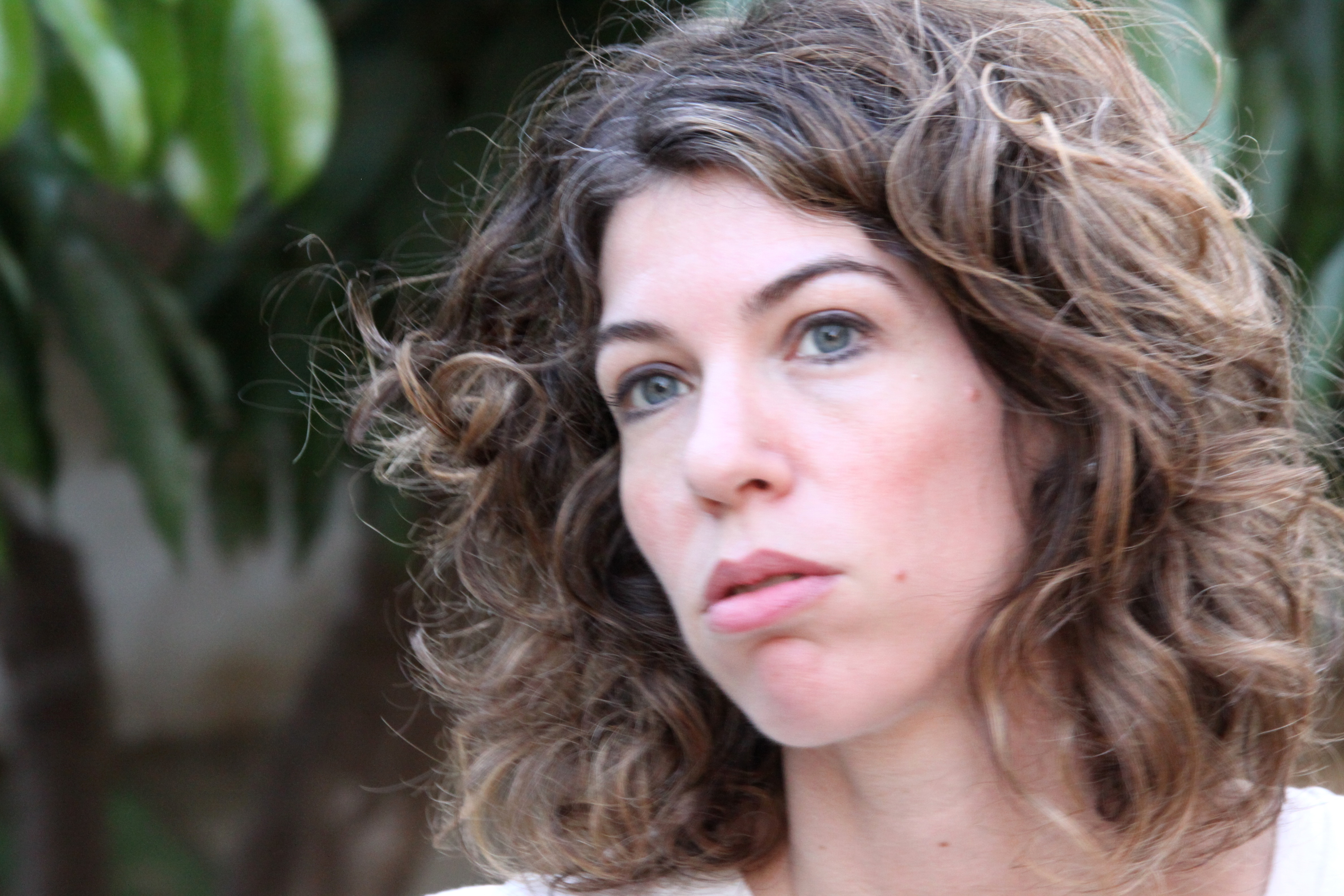
- Born: 21 January 1977 (age 49)
- Occupation: Translator

Rama Ayalon (Hebrew: רמה איילון) is an Israeli translator of French literature into Hebrew. She has translated over 100 books, encompassing classic and contemporary prose, philosophy, and psychoanalysis. Her translations include important philosophical works such as Pensées by Blaise Pascal and Totalité et infini by Emmanuel Lévinas. Among the prose authors she has translated are Michel Houellebecq, Georges Simenon, Marguerite Duras, Guy de Maupassant, Romain Gary, Milan Kundera, Delphine de Vigan, and Leïla Slimani.

In 2016, she received the Israeli Minister of Culture's Translation Prize.

In 2022, she was awarded Chevalier dans L’ordre des arts et des lettres by the French Minister of Culture.

In 2023, she received the Landau Arts Award.

== Translations ==
- Les derniers sur la liste, by Grégory Cingal - 2026 (Grasset, 2024)
- Vous êtes l’amour malheureux du Führer, by Jean-Noël Orengo - 2026 (Grasset, 2024)
- Pour être socialiste, by Léon Blum - 2026 (Librairie du Parti Socialiste et de l'Humanité, 1919)
- Nous n’avons rien à envier au reste du monde, by Nicolas Gaudemet - 2026 (Les éditions de l’Observatoire, 2025)
- Vies minuscules, by Pierre Michon - 2026 (Gallimard, 1984)
- Petites histoires de Nuits, by Kitty Crowther - 2026 (l'école des loisirs, 2017)
- La Civilisation des émotions, by Eva Illouz - 2026 (SEUIL, 2025)
- Les stratégies fatales, by Jean Baudrillard - 2026 (Grasset, 1983)
- De chair et de larmes, by L. M. Rapp - 2026 (Atoll publisher, 2023)
- Les enfants sont rois, by Delphine de Vigan - 2025 (Gallimard, 2021)
- WESTERN, by Maria Pourchet - 2025 (Stock, 2023)
- Vernon Subutex, 3, by Virginie Despentes — 2025 (Grasset, 2015)
- La Grande Peur dans la montagne, Charles Ferdinand Ramuz - 2025 (Grasset, 1926)
- La carte et le territoire (BD), by Michel Houellebecq, Louis Paillard (Flammarion, 2022)
- Le Mage du Kremlin, by Giuliano da Empoli - 2024 (Gallimard, 2022)
- Aussi riche que le roi, by Abigail Assor - 2024 (Gallimard, 2021)
- La familia grande, by Camille Kouchner - 2024 (Editions du Seuil, 2021)
- L'amour, by François Bégaudeau - 2024 (Verticales, 2023)
- La Fuite de monsieur Monde • La Veuve Couderc, by Georges Simenon — 2024 (Éditions de la Jeune Parque, 1945 • Gallimard, 1942)
- Vernon Subutex, 2, by Virginie Despentes — 2024 (Grasset, 2015)
- Cher connard, by Virginie Despentes — 2023 (Grasset, 2022)
- Emily L., by Marguerite Duras — 2023 (Minuit, 1987)
- Marie Curie et ses filles, by Claudine Monteil — 2023 (CALMANN-LÉVY, 2021)
- Vernon Subutex, 1, by Virginie Despentes — 2023 (Grasset, 2015)
- Auschwitz et après, by Charlotte Delbo — 2023 (Minuit, 1966-1971)
- Tous les hommes n'habitent pas le monde de la même façon, by Jean-Paul Dubois — 2023 (L'Olivier, 2019)
- Les Gratitudes, by Delphine de Vigan — 2022 (J.C. LATTÈS, 2019)
- Ce que le jour doit à la nuit, by Yasmina Khadra - 2022 (Éditions Julliard, 2008)
- Rien n'est noir, by Claire Berest — 2022 (Stock, 2019)
- L'anomalie, by Hervé Le Tellier — 2022 (Gallimard, 2020)
- La Cheffe, roman d'une cuisinière, by Marie Ndiaye — 2021 (Gallimard, 2016)
- La Vraie Vie, by Adeline Dieudonné — 2021 (L'Iconoclaste, 2018)
- Semmelweis, by Louis-Ferdinand Céline — 2021 (Simon, 1924)
- La Dame à la louve, by Renée Vivien — 2021 (Alphonse Lemerre, 1904)
- Le consentement, by Vanessa Springora — 2020 (Grasset, 2020)
- Maigret à New York, by Georges Simenon — 2020 (Presses de la Cité, 1947)
- La mise à nu, by Jean-Philippe Blondel — 2020 (Buchet-Chastel, 2018)
- Histoire de la violence, by Édouard Louis — 2020 (Éditions du Seuil, 2016)
- Désorientale, by Négar Djavadi — 2020
- L'invenzione occasionale, by Elena Ferrante — 2020 (from Italian)
- L'Affaire Saint-Fiacre, by Georges Simenon — 2020 (A. Fayard, 1932)
- La Disparition de Stephanie Mailer, by Joël Dicker — 2019 (Éditions de Fallois, 2018)
- D'après une histoire vraie, by Delphine de Vigan — 2019 (J.C. LATTÈS, 2015)
- l'itinéraire de pensée d'Emmanuel Levinas, by Georges Hansel — 2019
- The Word Collector, by Peter H. Reynolds — 2019 (from English)
- L'ordre du jour, by Eric Vuillard — 2018 (Actes Sud, 2017)
- Danser au bord de l’abîme, by Grégoire Delacourt — 2018 (J.-C. Lattès, 2016)
- En finir avec Eddy Bellegueule, by Édouard Louis — 2018 (Éditions du Seuil, 2014)
- Le chemin de la montagne, by Marianne Dubuc — 2018
- Rien ne s'oppose à la nuit, by Delphine de Vigan — 2018 (J.C. LATTÈS, 2011)
- Dans le Jardin de l'Ogre, by Leïla Slimani — 2018
- L'Amie de Madame Maigret, by Georges Simenon — 2018 (Presses de la Cité, 1950)
- La Nuit du carrefour, by Georges Simenon — 2018 (A. Fayard, 1931)
- Réparer les vivants, by Maylis de Kerangal — 2018
- Le Livre des Baltimore, by Joël Dicker — 2017 (Éditions de Fallois, 2015)
- Cécile est morte, by Georges Simenon — 2017 (Gallimard, 1942)
- Chanson douce, by Leïla Slimani — 2017 (Gallimard, 2016)
- 6h41, by Jean-Philippe Blondel — 2017 (Buchet-Chastel, 2013)
- Alors vous ne serez plus jamais triste, by Baptiste Beaulieu — 2017 (Fayard, 2015)
- Maigret et son mort, by Georges Simenon — 2017 (Presses de la Cité, 1948)
- Jacob, Jacob, by Valérie Zenatti — 2017 (L'Olivier, 2014)
- L'Horloger d'Everton & Les fantômes du chapelier, by Georges Simenon — 2016 (Presses de la Cité, 1954 & 1949)
- Pensées, by Blaise Pascal — 2016
- L'Inutile Beauté, recueil de nouvelles, by Guy de Maupassant — 2016
- Maigret tend un piège, by Georges Simenon — 2016 (Presses de la Cité, 1955)
- L'amour sans le faire, by Pierre Joncours — 2016 (Flammarion, 2012)
- Ennemies publics, by Michel Houellebecq and Bernard-Henri Lévy — 2016 (Flammarion et Grasset, 2008)
- La fête de l'insignifiance, by Milan Kundera — 2015
- Monsieur Gallet, décédé, by Georges Simenon — 2015 (A. Fayard, 1931)
- La femme au carnet rouge, by Antoine Laurent — 2015 (Flammarion, 2014)
- Alors Voilà, Les 1001 vies des urgences, by Baptiste Beaulieu — 2015
- Pseudo, by Romain Gary — 2015 (Mercure de France, 1976)
- Tête d'un homme, by Georges Simenon — 2015 (A. Fayard, 1931)
- Alex, by Pierre Lemaitre — 2015 (Albin Michel, 2011)
- Moderato cantabile, by Marguerite Duras — 2015 (Minuit, 1958)
- Monsieur le Commandant, by Romain Slocombe - 2015
- Histoire de la Merde, by Dominique Laporte — 2015
- Piettr-le-Letton, by Georges Simenon — 2014 (A. Fayard, 1931)
- Pierre et Jean, by Guy de Maupassant — 2014 (Paul Ollendorff, 1888)
- Le Sermon sur la Chute de Rome, by Jérôme Ferrari — 2014 (Actes Sud, 2012)
- La Verite sur l'affaire Harry Quebert, by Joël Dicker — 2014 (Éditions de Fallois, 2012)
- De Dieu qui vient à l'idée, by Emmanuel Lévinas — 2013 (Librairie Philosophique Vrin, 1982)
- L'Amant, by Marguerite Duras — 2013 (Les Éditions de Minuit, 1984)
- La Sorcière, by Marie Ndiaye — 2012 (Les Éditions de Minuit, 2003)
- Ce que je sais de Vera Candida, by Véronique Ovaldé — 2012 (Editions de l'Olivier, 2009)
- No et moi, by Delphine de Vigan — 2012 (J.C. LATTÈS, 2007)
- HHhH, by Laurent Binet — 2012 (éditions Grasset, 2010)
- Grand loup & petit loup, by Nadine Brun-Cosme and Olivier Tallec — 2011 (PERE CASTOR, 2005)
- La carte et le territoire, by Michel Houellebecq — 2011 (Flammarion, 2010)
- Tobie Lolness II - Les yeux d'Elisha, by Timothée de Fombelle — 2011 (Gallimard Jeunesse, 2007)
- Histoire d'Ali Baba & Histoire d'Aladdin des Mille et Une Nuits III, Traduction d'Antoine Galland — 2011 (Flammarion, 2004)
- Je suis le dernier Juif, by Chil Rajchman — 2011 (les Arènes, 2009)
- L'espèce humaine, by Robert Antelme, Am Oved — 2011 (Gallimard, 1978)
- Le village de l`allemand, by Boualem Sansal — 2010 (Gallimard, 2008)
- Le dernier frère, by Nathacha Appanah — 2010 (L'Olivier, 2007)
- Totalité et infini, by Emmanuel Lévinas — 2010
- Lanzarote et autre textes, by Michel Houellebecq — 2010 (Librio, 2002)
- Tobie Lolness I, by Timothée de Fombelle — 2009 (Gallimard Jeunesse, 2006)
- Alabama Song, by Gilles Leroy — 2009 (Mercure de France, 2007)
- Camille et Paul – La passion Claudel, by Dominique Bona — 2008 (Grasset, 2006)
- Le Piège de Dante, by Arnaud Delalande — 2008 (Grasset, 2006)
- J'étais derrière toi, by Nicolas Fargues — 2008 (P.O.L, 2006)
- Seras-tu là?, by Guillaume Musso — 2007 (XO, 2006)
- Rester Vivant: Méthode, by Michel Houellebecq — 2007 (La Différence, 1991)
- J'apprend L'allemand, by Denis Lachaud — 2007 (Actes Sud, 1999)
- Impératrice, by Shan Sa — 2007 (ALBIN MICHEL, 2003)
- De la passion, by Jacques André, Paul-Laurent Assoun, Jean Cournut, Julia Kristeva, Joyce McDougall, François Gautheret — 2007 (PUF, 1998)
- Farrago, by Yann Apperry — 2006 (Grasset, 2003)
- Rosie Carpe, by Marie Ndiaye — 2006 (MINUIT, 2009)
- Moi, Bouddha, by José Frèches — 2006 (XO, 2004)
- Liberté dialectique, by Izchak Klein — 2006 (Herbert & Cie Lang AG, Buchhandlung Antiquariat, 2000)
- Mohammed Cohen, by Claude Kayat — 2006 (Éditions du Seuil, 1981)
- Les Scénarios narcissiques de la parentalité, by J. Manzano, P. Espasa, and N. Zilkha — 2005 (PUF, 1999)
