= Le Démon de midi (novel) =

1914 novel by Paul Bourget addressing Catholic themes and the modernist crisis

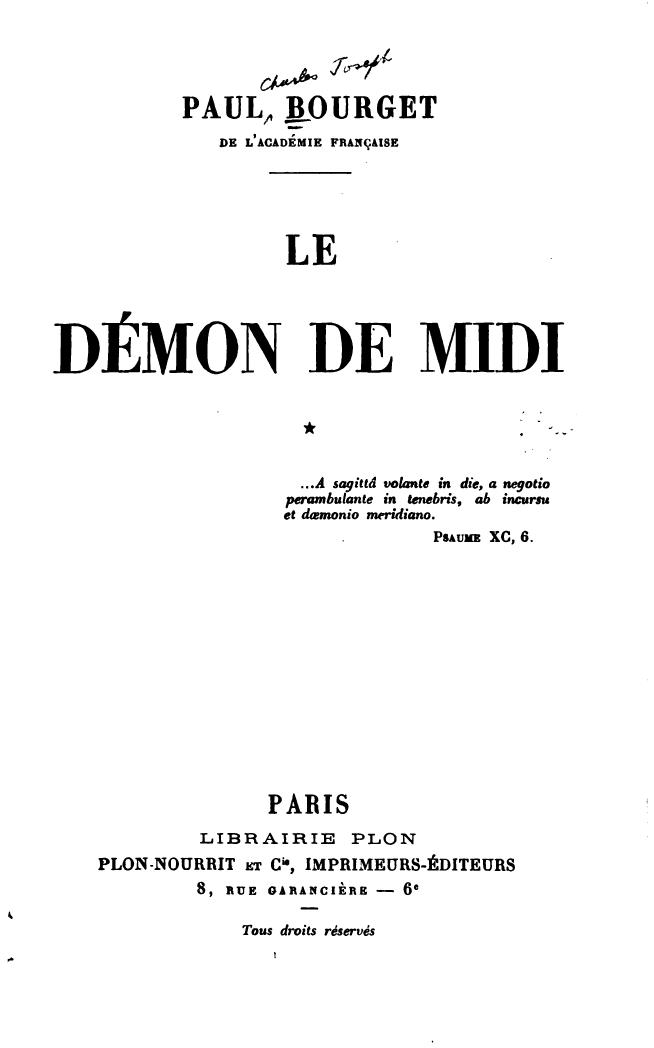
- Cover page of the novel
- Author: Paul Bourget
- Genre: Philosophical novel
- Publisher: Plon-Nourrit
- Publication date: 1914
- Preceded by: L'Émigré (1907)
- Followed by: Le Sens de la mort (1915)

Le Démon de midi is a novel by French writer Paul Bourget (1852–1935), published in 1914 by Plon-Nourrit in Paris. (Note: The literary salon of Isabelle d'Argenson, which saw the debut of François Mauriac, also helped promote Paul Bourget. The recent rediscovery of Bourget's correspondence with the Marquise d'Argenson sheds light on the genesis of Le Démon de midi. This correspondence, owned until 2007 by Isabelle d'Argenson's grandson, contemporary writer Robert de Goulaine, is now available for consultation upon request at Le Plantier de Costebelle, Paul Bourget's home in Hyères.) This philosophical novel, steeped in ideological themes, akin to L'Étape (1902) or Un divorce (1904), allows the academician to explore social, political, and religious themes dear to him, inspired by his reading of Joseph de Maistre, a theorist of the Counter-revolution. The novel addresses themes such as opposition to revolutionary ideologies, support for the Catholic Church, and the defense of traditional family and patriotic values. Through its portrayal of contemporary ecclesiastical circles, Bourget underscores what he viewed as the need for intellectual and moral discipline, guided by an authoritative magisterium.

The narrative is set against the backdrop of the Catholic modernist crisis, a movement that, between 1900 and 1910, questioned aspects of traditional Church teaching and provoked strong reactions among theologians close to Pope Pius X. Bourget incorporates the positions articulated by the Holy See in papal documents condemning Modernism.

The publication of Le Démon de midi provided historians of Modernism in the Catholic Church an opportunity to offer their interpretations of the theses presented in the novel and the limitations of the novelist’s conservative vision.

== Title and dedication ==
is commonly understood today as a reference to the surge of sexual desire sometimes associated with midlife. Paul Bourget, however, employs the term in its older sense, referring to acedia, one of the seven deadly sins. (Note: The Catechism of the Catholic Church (1992) defines acedia, a term no longer in common use, as "a form of depression due to the relaxation of asceticism". It refers to moral laziness. Acedia is a malaise of the soul expressed through boredom, withdrawal from prayer, penance, and spiritual reading; it is thus linked to the modern deadly sin of sloth.) As early as the 4th century, the “demon of noon” was invoked in descriptions of desert monks afflicted by impatience with solitude, melancholic visions, and an overwhelming urge to abandon their surroundings. Noon was traditionally regarded as the moment most conducive to such temptations.

The novel is dedicated to René Bazin, Bourget’s close friend and long-time literary supporter, through an extensive letter dated 24 June 1914. In this dedicatory preface, Bourget explains the motivations behind the book, presenting it as a philosophical novel intended to examine what he viewed as heterodox tendencies within contemporary religious circles, including perceived innovations such as a revival of primitive liturgical practices or the idea of clerical marriage. He also distances his characters from any direct association with the Irish convert and modernist figure George Tyrrell.

The preface further invokes the memory of Walter Scott, whose Old Mortality Bourget cites as a model for a novel engaging with religious debate.

== Genesis ==
Begun in Clermont-Ferrand in 1912, Le Démon de midi was completed in June 1914. According to Bourget, the initial concept arose on 7 August 1898 during a discussion with Eugène-Melchior de Vogüé at the centenary commemoration of Chateaubriand’s funeral in Saint-Malo, where they reflected on what they saw as the inconsistency between Chateaubriand’s conduct and his ideas. The first draft was completed in Paris, on Rue Barbet-de-Jouy, in the residence of the Marquise d’Argenson, a close friend of Bourget who lived nearby and frequently hosted the author.

The genesis of Le Démon de midi in the salons of the Marquise d'Argenson, 1912

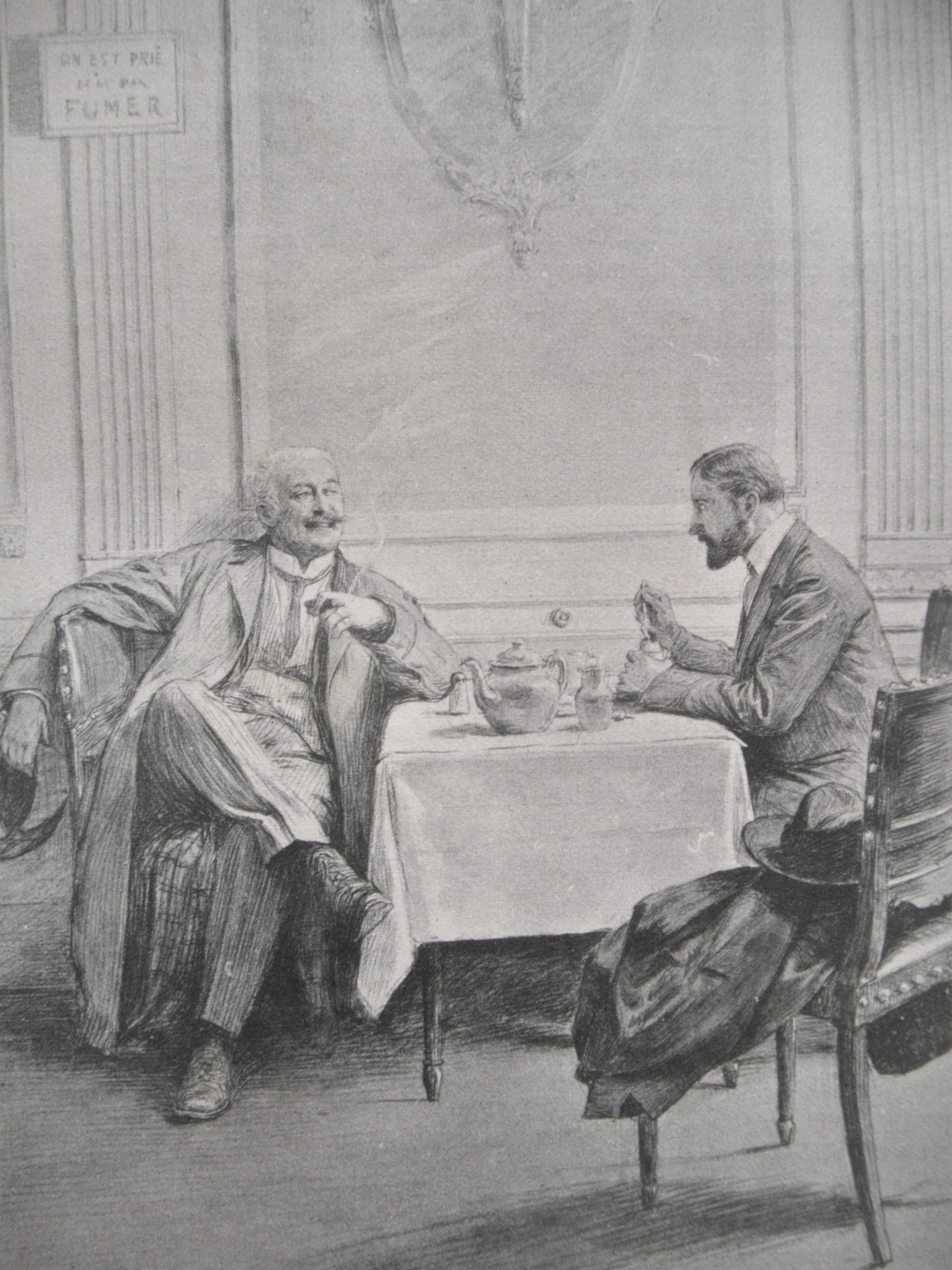
Calvières and Louis Savignan, main characters of the novel.

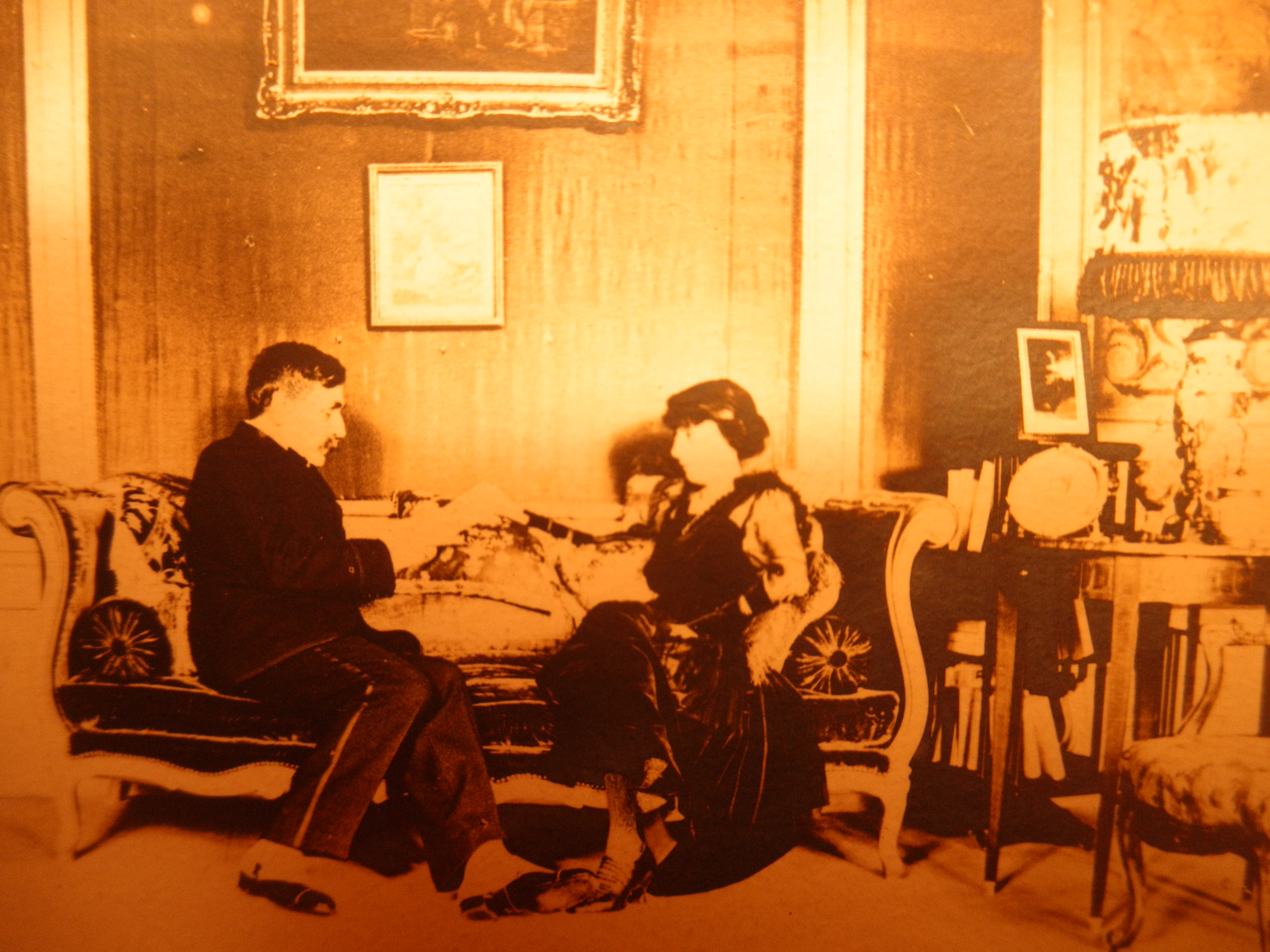
The Parisian salons of the Marquise d’Argenson. Bourget reviews the manuscript.

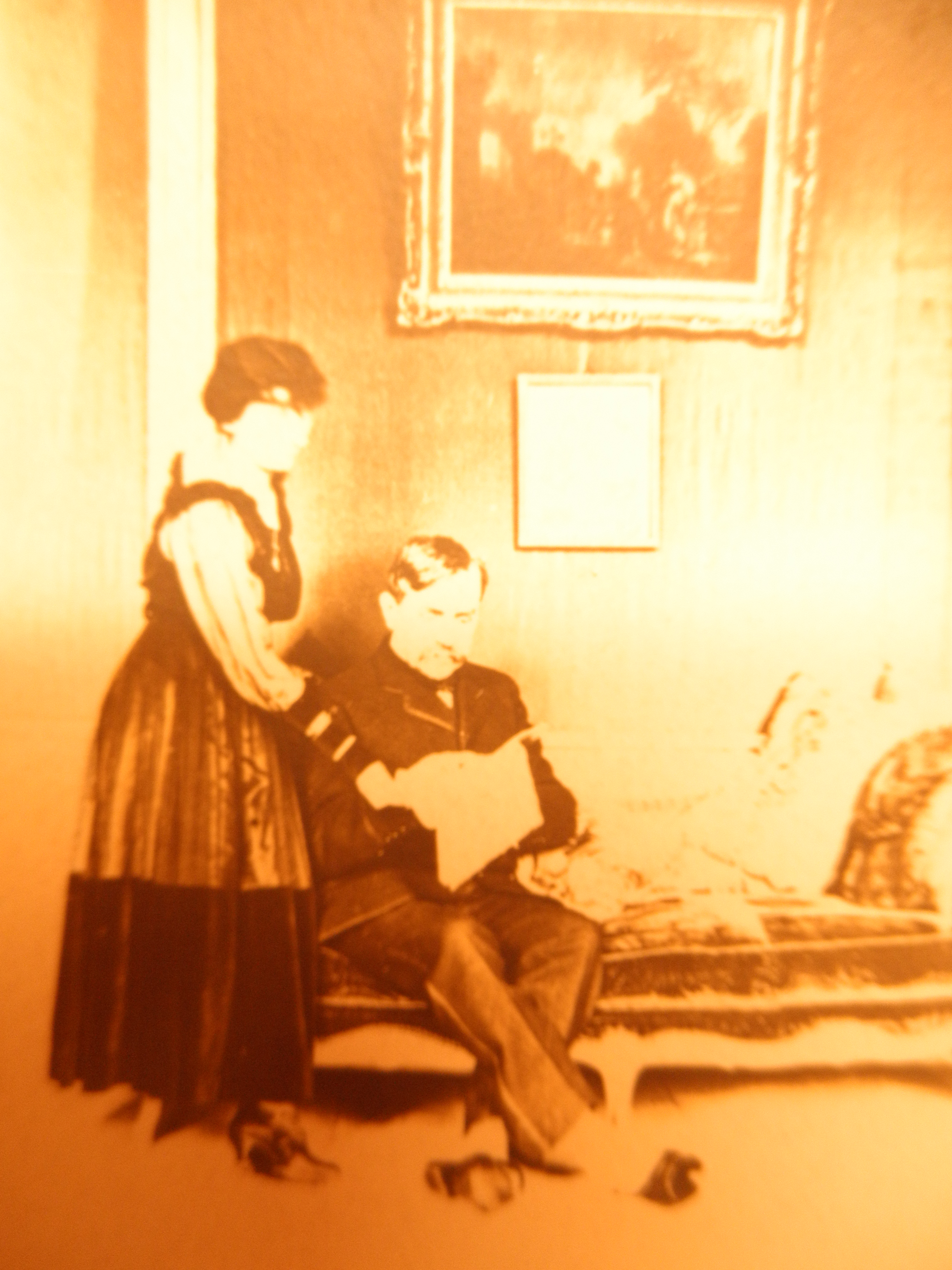
Bourget and Madame d’Argenson at rue Barbet-de-Jouy, reviewing the novel’s manuscript.

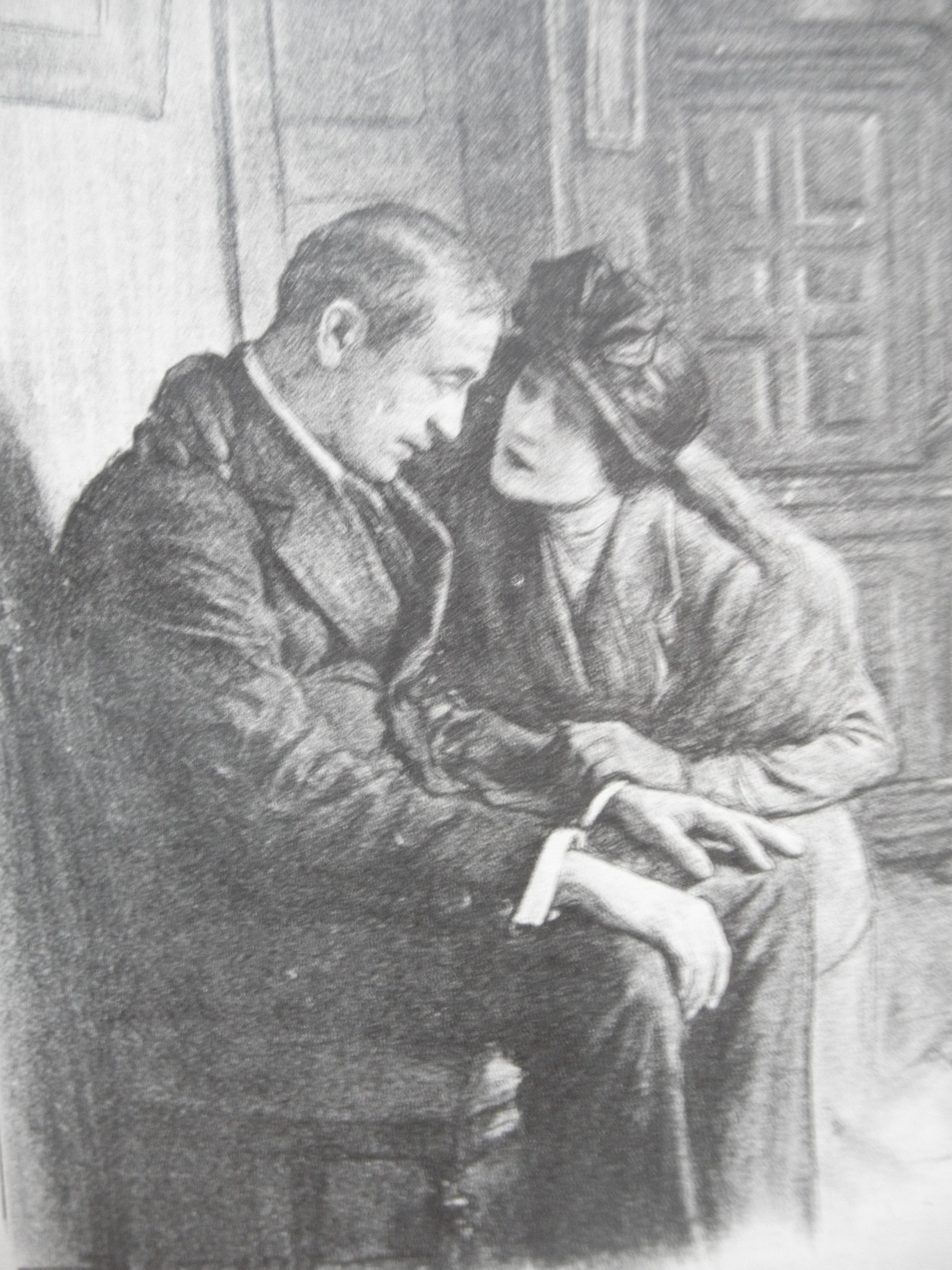
Jacques Savignan and Thérèse, two protagonists of the novel.
Copy enriched with an autographed dedication by the author to Gérard Bauër and a preface corrected by Paul Bourget

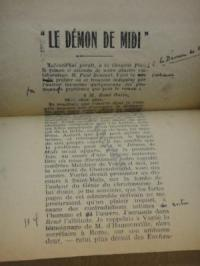
Preface corrected by Bourget’s hand.

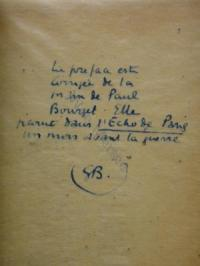
Handwritten note by Gérard Bauër.

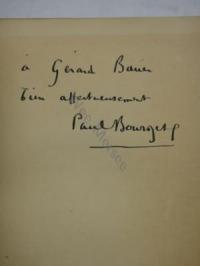
Autographed dedication by Bourget to Bauër.

== Historical context of modernism ==
The modernist movement refers to a crisis of values that affected Catholic societies in the early 20th century. Its proponents sought to reform theological education, renew biblical exegesis, and adapt Christian apologetics to contemporary philosophical thought and the emerging secular sciences. In France, the most prominent modernist figure was Alfred Loisy, a former professor of Sacred Scripture at the Catholic University of Paris, who was dismissed for publications considered heterodox. (Note: These two publications deemed heterodox are L'Évangile et l'Église (1902) and Autour d'un petit livre (1903).) He was later subjected to major excommunication in 1908 by Pope Pius X.

=== Position of Pope Pius X ===
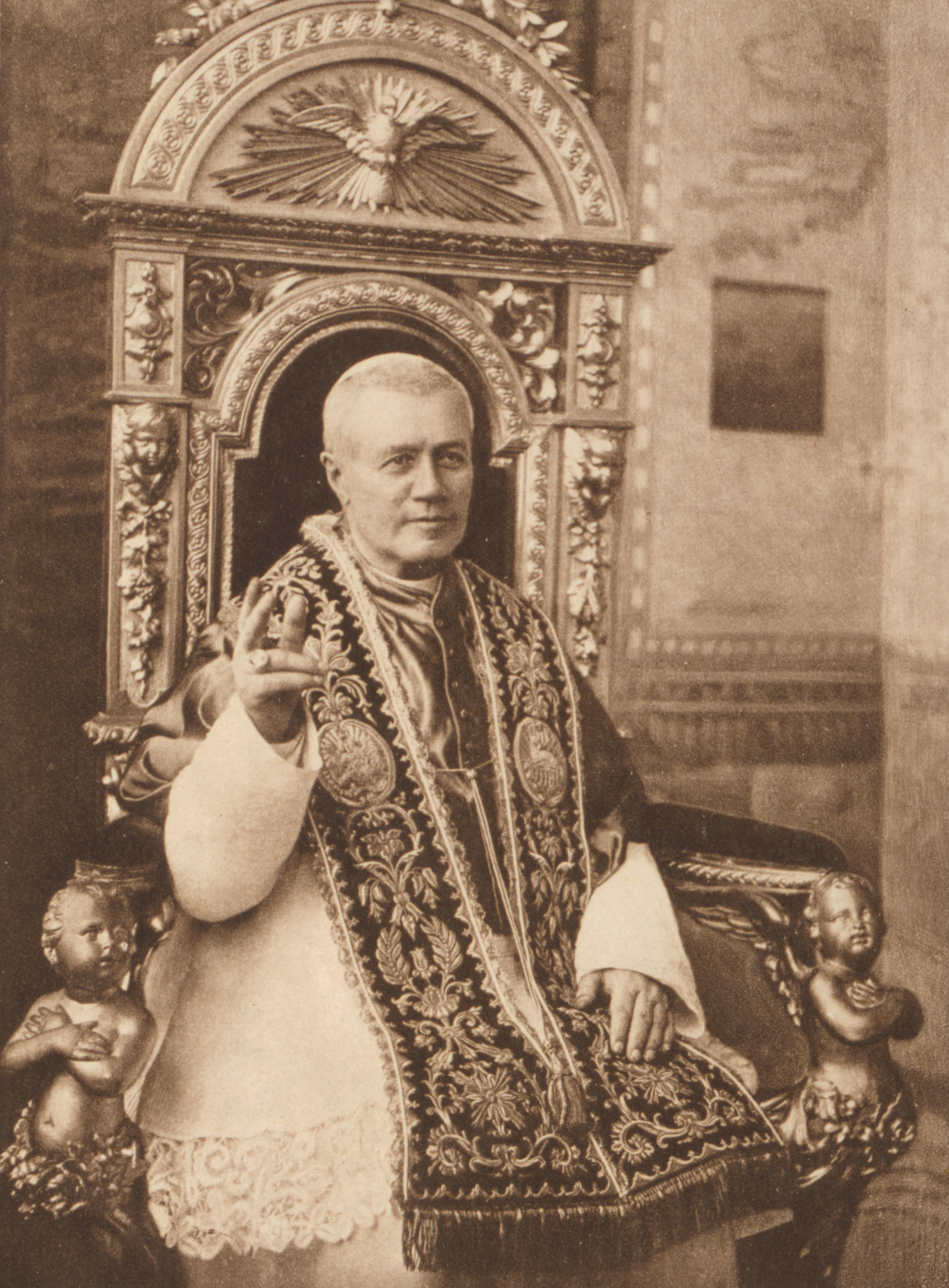
Pope Pius X, described by Paul Bourget as "the saint and the great", unequivocally condemned modernism in 1907.

Pope Pius X declared that the motto of his pontificate was “to restore all things in Christ” (Omnia instaurare in Christo) and initiated two major campaigns against Modernism.

The first began in 1907 with the decree Lamentabili sane exitu and the motu proprio Præstantia of November 18, 1907, which affirmed the full authority of the decrees of the Pontifical Biblical Commission (many of which opposed modernist scriptural theories) and imposed an excommunication reserved to the Holy See on those who upheld modernist doctrines. This movement received its official consecration with the encyclical Pascendi Dominici Gregis of September 8, 1907, in which Pius X characterized Modernism as the “synthesis of all heresies” and condemned it unequivocally.

In 1910, during the second anti-modernist campaign, the Pope introduced the Oath Against Modernism. Bourget aligned his position with that of the Magisterium during this period through the publication of Le Démon de midi.

In 1914, a list of 24 Thomistic theses described as proponantur veluti normæ directivæ tutæ (“to be proposed as safe directive norms”), was promulgated as part of broader efforts to counter Modernism. Pius X additionally established a program involving oversight of seminaries, the censorship of books and periodicals, and the creation of diocesan vigilance councils.

Support for the Magisterium among clergy and historians appeared in works intended for the faithful or for seminarians, such as Abbot Augustin Aubry’s Contre le modernisme (1927). Similar positions were expressed by Father Yves de La Brière in Études, who defended what he saw as the necessary rigor of Pius X’s measures. Other contributors to the anti-modernist movement included Father Charles Maignen, Canon Georges Monchamp, Abbot Henri Delassus, Jesuit Father Fontaine, (Note: The leading voice of anti-modernism, Jesuit Julien Fontaine, was tasked with the doctrinal refutation of Loisy and demonstrated that Loisy’s positions were indistinguishable from liberal Protestantism, particularly that of Harnack.) Abbots Paul Boulin and Bernard Gaudeau, (Note: In 1908, Abbot Bernard Gaudeau founded La Foi catholique, a journal aimed at combating Kantianism, suspected of being the source of modernism.) Canon Théodore Delmont, Léonce de Grandmaison, and especially Umberto Benigni, creator of La Sapinière. Outside the Church, observers such as historian Charles Guignebert argued in Modernisme et tradition catholique en France (1908) that internal inconsistencies would ultimately undermine the modernist movement.

=== Paul Bourget’s view on modernism ===
Paul Bourget adopted a position closely aligned with that of the Catholic Church under Pope Pius X, publishing articles supportive of the pontiff and reflecting the arguments set out in contemporary Vatican documents, including encyclicals and apostolic constitutions. The second major anti-modernist initiative of the Magisterium—the motu proprio Sacrorum Antistitum of 1 September 1910, which introduced the Oath Against Modernism and measures aimed at curbing modernist influence—appeared shortly before the publication of Le Démon de midi. Bourget praised these texts, presenting Pius X as a providential defender of sound reason.

In 1908, he published Le Pape de l’ordre, in which he described the Church as “the inner fortress, the model society of all societies, balancing independence and obedience, the eternal and the transient, tradition and renewal". His criticism of Alfred Loisy’s modernism had already been expressed in correspondence with Ferdinand Brunetière in 1903, in L'Écho de Paris on April 27, 1908, and in his Billet de Junius in 1909. In 1906, at the request of the Institute of Action Française, he inaugurated the chair of the Syllabus of Errors led by Abbot Georges de Pascal, (Note: Born in 1840, Georges de Pascal took the Dominican habit in 1860 in Lyon. Ordained a priest in 1865, he served as a theology professor in a convent until 1876. A traditionalist, monarchist, and fiercely opposed to the French Revolution of 1789, he was an anti-liberal abbot representing intransigent Catholicism rooted in scholastic Thomism.) with the support of Monsignor de Cabrières.

Bourget’s opposition to the movement Le Sillon, noted by Éric Vatré, similarly reflects his adherence to the intellectual framework established by the Magisterium during the anti-modernist campaign.

== Plot ==
Louis Savignan, a prominent Catholic writer in his early forties, is approached by a wealthy industrialist, Fernand Calvières, to stand as a candidate in the legislative elections in Auvergne. Savignan accepts and returns to his native region, where he reunites with his former fiancée, Geneviève de Soléac, who had left him under family pressure to marry Calvières. Despite his religious principles, Savignan enters into an adulterous relationship with her, compromising both his moral integrity and his electoral prospects. Savignan’s son, Jacques, initially devoted to his father, gradually distances himself under the influence of Abbot Fauchon, an austere and scholarly priest sympathetic to modernist ideas. Fauchon, a specialist in early Church history, advocates a “scientific” approach to Scripture, vernacular liturgy, clerical marriage, and democratic reforms. He has been censured for a book on the discipline of the early centuries in which he highlights evidence of priestly marriage. Jacques hopes to marry Thérèse Andrault, but she elopes from her family and instead marries Fauchon, who renounces his priesthood to establish a new form of worship inspired by what he considers the authentic practices of the early Church, which he calls the “Cult of the Catacombs.” Savignan then engages in a heated public controversy with the former priest.

The affair between Savignan and Geneviève is eventually discovered by Calvières, who also finds Savignan’s letters and brings them to Fauchon, hoping they can be used against his rival. Thérèse, now disillusioned with Fauchon and seeking to avoid a scandal, informs Jacques of the situation. Jacques confronts the ex-abbot and forcibly seizes the compromising letters. Fauchon, attempting to intimidate him, picks up a pistol; Thérèse intervenes, and in the struggle a shot is accidentally fired, fatally wounding Jacques. During his long agony, Jacques urges all involved to correct their errors. They do so: Thérèse returns to her family, Geneviève reconciles with her husband, and Savignan enters a period of spiritual doubt from which he is expected to recover. Fauchon withdraws to a monastery and ultimately returns to the Church.

== Characters ==
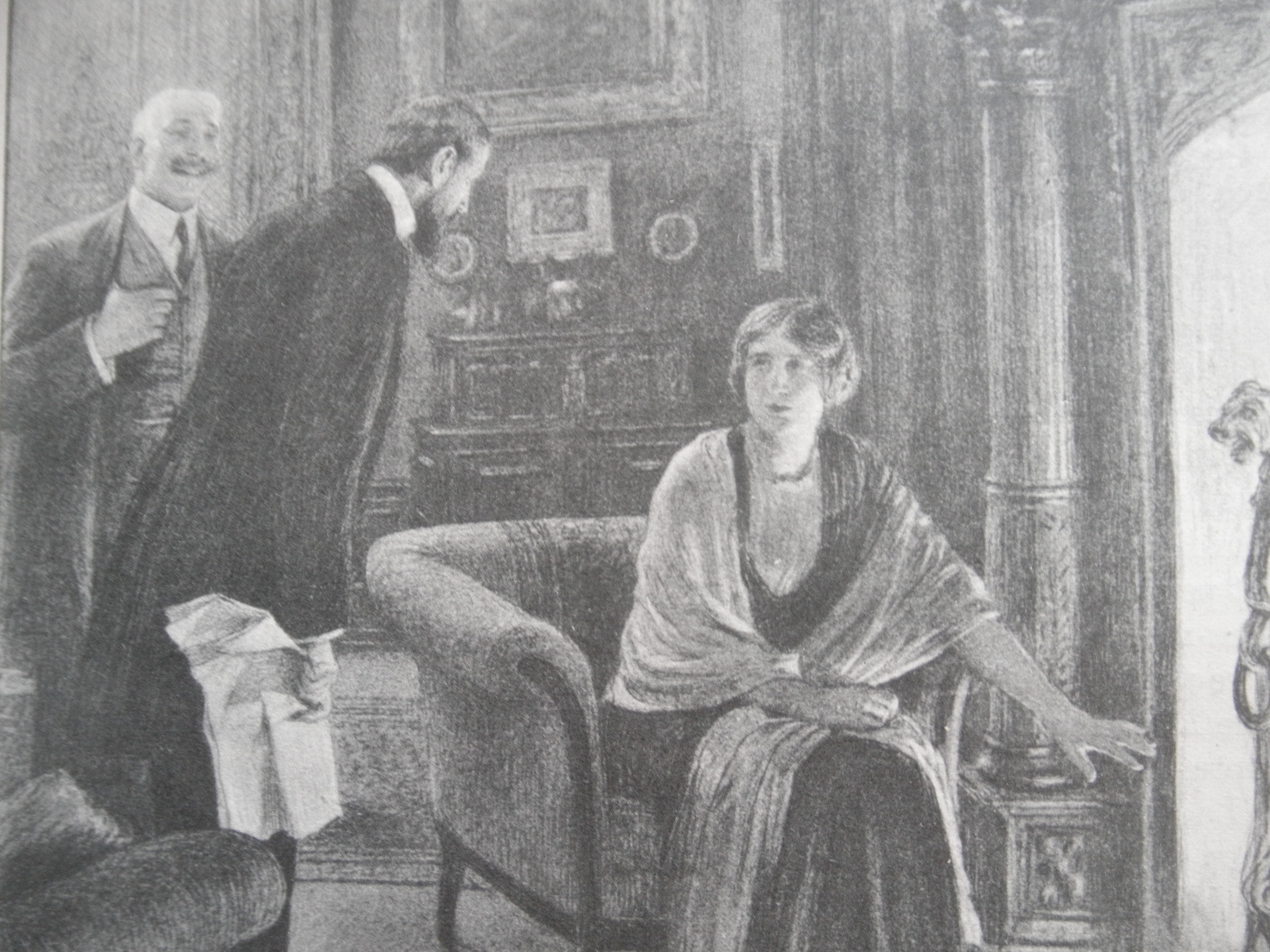
Calvières and his wife Geneviève receive Louis Savignan.

=== Louis Savignan ===
Louis Savignan, a native of Clermont-Ferrand like Paul Bourget, is depicted as a skilled historian and polemicist in his forties. He is a devout Catholic with a reputation for impeccable conduct, yet he is confronted by a rekindled past love he believed he had long overcome. Two decades later, he encounters this intense former attachment, which he had thought subdued by his steadfast commitment to conservative principles. Over the course of the novel, Savignan increasingly contemplates the liturgy, though he is not as versed in it as the priests portrayed in Maurice Barrès’s La Colline inspirée. Nevertheless, he reflects on the sanctifying aspects of the liturgy at key moments, especially during crises in his personal life. The novel centers on the tension between Savignan’s thoughts and writings on morality and faith and his actions in his adulterous relationship with Geneviève Calvières. His internal conflict illustrates the struggle between human weakness and moral temptation, forming the emotional and philosophical core of the narrative.

=== Abbot Fauchon ===
Abbot Justin Fauchon is a pivotal figure in the novel. Initially portrayed as a man of rigor and orthodoxy, he gradually departs from established Church teachings, moving toward heresy. Fauchon eventually founds a schismatic and autonomous church, La Catacombe, and publishes a modernist, secular, and agnostic work, scandalizing the religious community. He further complicates matters by entering a romantic relationship with a young woman, Thérèse. The character bears notable resemblance to Charles Loyson, known as Father Hyacinthe, who in 1869 openly opposed papal authority, faced excommunication, and in 1872 married a young American Presbyterian widow while continuing to celebrate Mass and affirm his Catholic faith. Loyson also expressed an attraction to Protestantism, paralleling Fauchon’s ideological and personal departures from orthodox Catholicism. (Note: Hyacinthe Loyson was summoned to Rome by Pope Pius IX. It took him six months to respond to this summons. On his return, he visited Florence and Munich to meet Ignaz von Döllinger, the prominent historian of the time and an inspiration for the Old Catholic movement, to whom he confessed that he "feels an attraction to Protestantism".)

== Narrative structure ==
In the context of the early 20th-century debate on the definition of the novel, particularly between Paul Bourget and Albert Thibaudet, Bourget defended a traditional French conception of novelistic structure. In Le Démon de midi, this structure is characterized by a coherent narrative in which each episode contributes to a cumulative denouement. The sequence of events is carefully arranged so that the characters function as exemplars, illustrating the thematic and moral points the author seeks to demonstrate.

Throughout the narrative, Bourget frequently intervenes to explicate the emotional and psychological states of characters such as Louis Savignan and Abbot Fauchon, employing narrative metalepsis. This technique leaves relatively little interpretive space for the reader, resulting in what has been described as "minimal engagement".

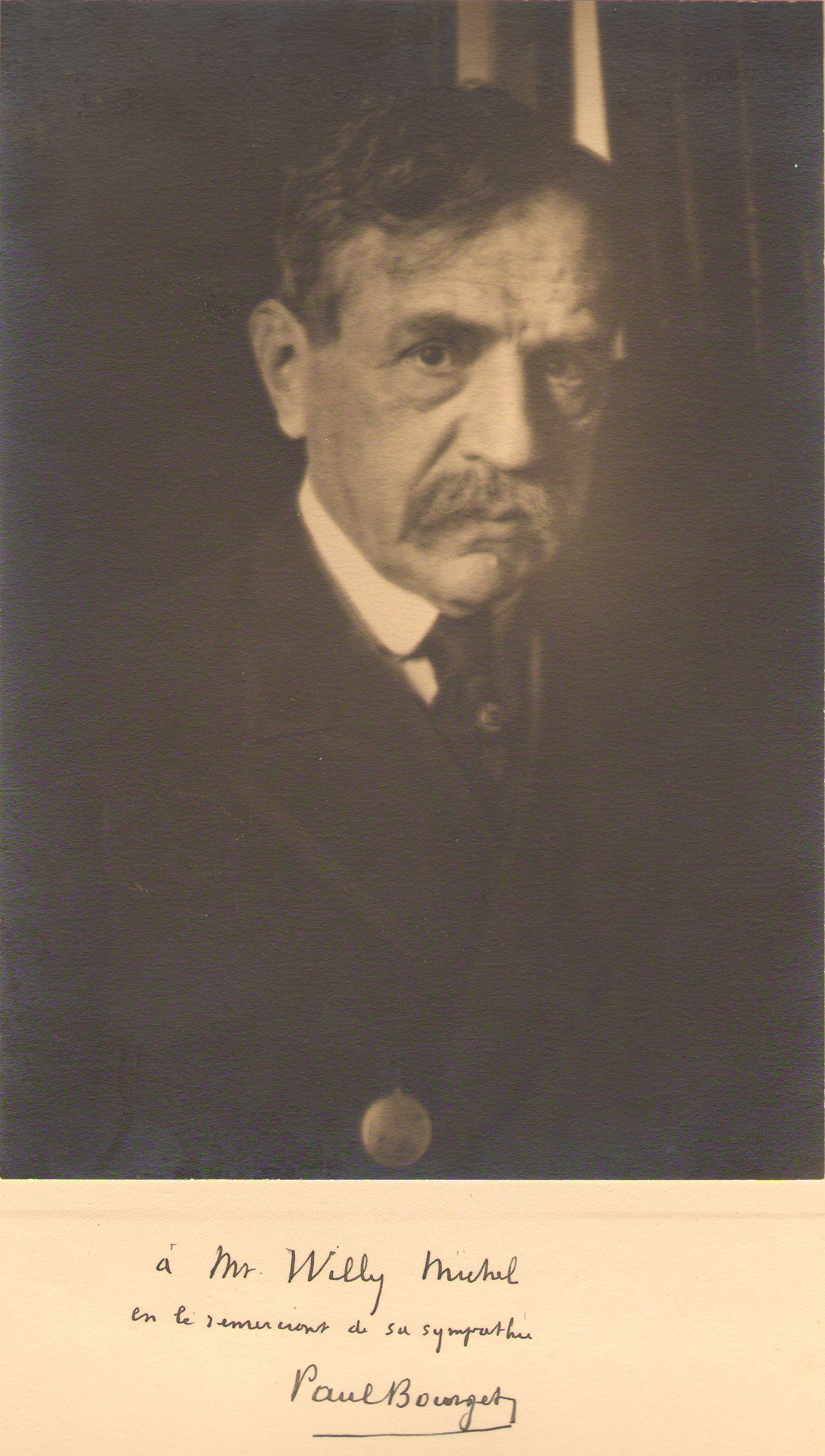
Paul Bourget, novelist opposed to modernists.

== Reception and criticism ==
Le Démon de midi was published on July 22, 1914, shortly before France’s entry into World War I. Its release coincided with a period of intense international tension, following the assassination of Archduke Franz Ferdinand in Sarajevo less than two weeks earlier, which diverted public attention from literary affairs. Contemporary reception was mixed. André Gide responded to the novel with cautious approval, while Paul Valéry, in a 1914 letter to Gide, offered a more ambivalent assessment, acknowledging the work as Bourget’s most fully realized despite its perceived intellectual and stylistic flaws:

And despite all possible contempt for the wretched author, the impurity, the intellectual bric-a-brac where the medical, theological, and Balzacian mix together, despite the ever-present ignominy, this is still his best book. The one, therefore, where he appears in all his naivety [sic].

Modern commentators have continued to examine the novel’s ideological and literary significance. In Le Démon de midi (2008), psychoanalyst Paul-Laurent Assoun analyzed Bourget’s anti-modernist stance, acknowledging both its philosophical rigor and its ambiguities. On the centenary of World War I, writer Philippe Lançon offered a highly critical view, situating the novel within the context of rapidly evolving artistic and literary movements:

Le Démon de midi appears at a time when new artistic movements and the war immediately render it outdated: Cubism, the poems of Guillaume Apollinaire, but above all the first volume of Marcel Proust’s In Search of Lost Time, published the previous year, which buries alive all these trinkets of moral psychology.

== See also ==
- The Disciple
- Paul Bourget
- Le Plantier de Costebelle
- Modernism in the Catholic Church

== Bibliography ==
- Feuillerat, Albert (1937). Paul Bourget, histoire d'un esprit sous la IIIe République [Paul Bourget, History of a Mind under the Third Republic] (in French). Paris: Plon. LCCN 37023501.
- Bordeaux, Henry (1954). Reconstructeurs et mainteneurs [Rebuilders and Maintainers] (in French). Paris: Librairie Plon. OCLC 458639743.
- Mathias, Yéhoshua (1995). "Paul Bourget, écrivain engagé" [Paul Bourget, Committed Writer]. Vingtième siècle: Revue d'histoire (in French) (45). Paris: Presses de Sciences Po: 14–29. ISSN 0294-1759.
- Voisin-Fougère, Marie-Ange; Sangsue, Daniel (2005). Avez-vous lu Paul Bourget ? [Have You Read Paul Bourget?] (Conference proceedings). Écritures (in French). Dijon: Éditions Universitaires de Dijon. ISBN 978-2-915552-65-2.
