= Ayalon =

Ayalon (Hebrew: אַיָּלוֹן, איילון, ‘place of deer’) is an Israeli placename and a Hebrew family name. In English and other European languages it was in the past also transliterated as Ajalon. It is derived from 'ayál (אייל ‘deer’). It may refer to the following:

== Places ==
- Ayalon Valley, a valley and Biblical town in Israel
- Ayalon Prison, a prison in Israel that reportedly held "Prisoner X"
- Ayalon Cave, a cave near Ramla, Israel
- Ayalon River, a small, mostly dried-out river in Israel
- Machon Ayalon, a bullet factory disguised as a kibbutz near Ayalon
- Highway 20 (Israel) (Ayalon Highway), a major freeway in Israel
- Ayalon Mall, a mall in Ramat Gan

== People ==
- Ami Ayalon, an Israeli politician and retired IDF general
- Danny Ayalon, an Israeli diplomat and former ambassador to the United States
- David Ayalon (1914–1998), an Israeli historian of Islam and the Middle East
- Rama Ayalon, an Israeli French-to-Hebrew translator

== See also ==
- Eilon
