= Le Démon de midi =

Le Démon de midi may refer to:

- Le Démon de midi (novel), a 1914 novel by Paul Bourget
- The Demon Stirs (French: Le Démon de midi), a 2005 French comedy film, based on the graphic novel
- Le Démon de midi (graphic novel), a graphic novel by Florence Cestac
