= Pecunia non olet =

Latin saying

Pecunia non olet is a Latin saying that means "money has no smell". The phrase is ascribed to the Roman emperor Vespasian (ruled AD 69–79).

== History ==
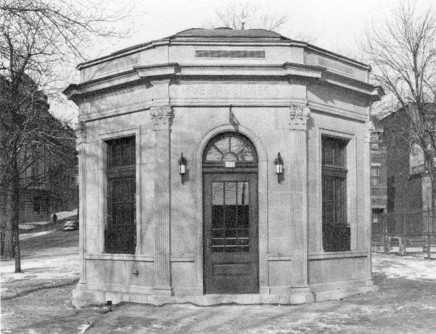
"Vespasienne" in Montreal, Canada, 1930

A tax on the disposal of urine, an important ingredient to the Roman chemical industry, was first imposed by Emperor Nero under the name of vectigal urinae in the first century AD. The tax was removed after a while, but Vespasian re-enacted it around 70 AD in order to fill the treasury.

Vespasian imposed a urine tax on the distribution of urine from Rome's public urinals (the Roman lower classes urinated into pots, which were later emptied into cesspools). The urine collected from these public urinals was sold as an ingredient for several chemical processes. It was used in tanning, wool production, and also by launderers as a source of ammonia to clean and whiten woollen togas. The buyers of the urine paid the tax.

The Roman historian Suetonius reports that when Vespasian's son Titus complained about the disgusting nature of the tax, his father held up a gold coin and asked whether he felt offended by its smell (sciscitans num odore offenderetur). When Titus said "No", Vespasian replied, "Yet it comes from urine" (Atqui ex lotio est).

The phrase pecunia non olet is still used today to say that money does not care about its origins. Vespasian's name still attaches to public urinals in Italy (vespasiano) and France (vespasienne).

== See also ==
- List of Latin phrases

== Sources ==
- Lissner, Ivar. Power and Folly: the story of the Caesars ISBN 978-0224604338
- Suetonius. De Vita Caesarum--Divus Vespasianus
- Laporte, Dominique. History of Shit ISBN 978-2-267-00109-9
