= Gilles Leroy =

French writer (born 1958)

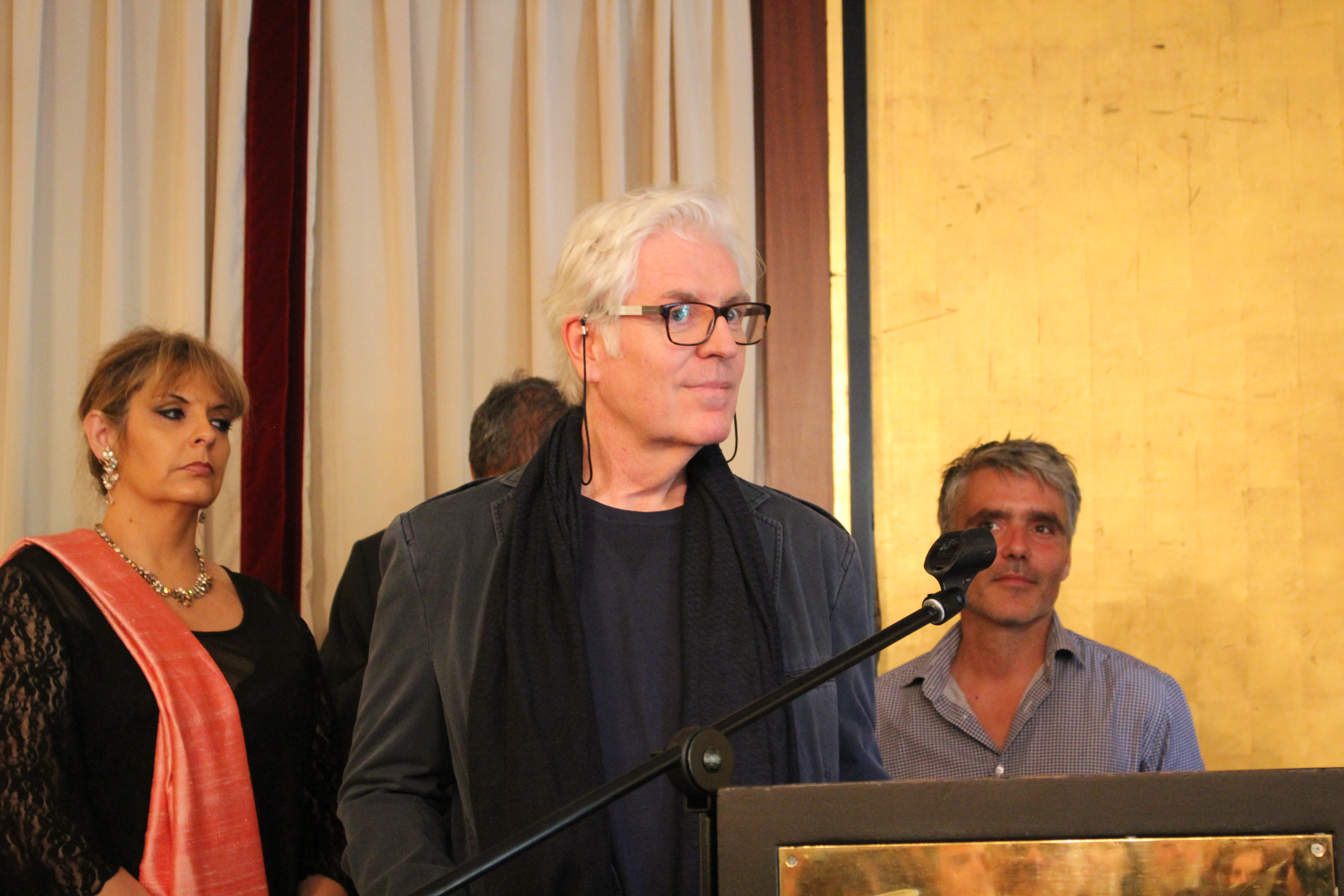
- Born: 28 December 1958 (age 67); Bagneux, Hauts-de-Seine, France
- Occupation: Novelist
- Website: www.gillesleroy.net

Gilles Leroy (French pronunciation: [ʒil ləʁwa]; born 28 December 1958 in Bagneux, Hauts-de-Seine) is a French writer. He studied at the Lycée Lakanal in Sceaux, which appears in his 1996 novel Les Maîtres du monde as the "Lycée Ducasse". His novel Alabama song won the Prix Goncourt in 2007.

== Bibliography ==
Novels and short stories

- 1987 : Habibi, novel, (Michel de Maule);
- 1990 : Maman est morte, novel, (Michel de Maule);
- 1991 : Les Derniers seront les premiers, short story, (Mercure de France);
- 1992 : Madame X, roman, (Mercure de France);
- 1994 : Les Jardins publics, novel, (Mercure de France);
- 1996 : Les Maîtres du monde, novel, (Mercure de France);
- 1998 : Machines à sous, novel, (Mercure de France);
- 2000 : Soleil noir, novel, (Mercure de France);
- 2002 : L'Amant russe, novel, (Mercure de France);
- 2004 : Grandir, novel, (Mercure de France);
- 2005 : Champsecret, novel, (Mercure de France);
- 2007 : Alabama song, novel, (Mercure de France), Goncourt Prize 2007;
- 2010 : Zola Jackson, novel, (Mercure de France) .

Theatre

- 2005 : Le Jour des fleurs,
- SPY, 2008.

== See also ==
- Contemporary French literature
- List of LGBT writers

== Awards ==
- 1992 : Prix Nanterre de la nouvelle for Les Derniers seront les premiers.
- 1999 : Prix Valery Larbaud for Machines à sous.
- 2004 : Prix Millepages, Prix Cabourg for Grandir.
- 2005 : Chevalier des Arts et des Lettres.
- 2007 : Prix Goncourt for Alabama song.
- 2008 : Prix Flaubert des lycéens for Alabama Song.
- 2010 : Prix Eté du Livre for Zola Jackson.
