= Alabama Song (novel) =

2007 novel by Gilles Leroy

- Author: Gilles Leroy
- Language: French
- Publisher: Mercure de France
- Publication date: 23 August 2007
- Publication place: France
- Pages: 189
- ISBN: 978-2-7152-2645-6

Alabama Song (2007) is a French-language novel by French novelist Gilles Leroy. It is a fictional autobiography of Zelda Fitzgerald, wife of F. Scott Fitzgerald. Although Gilles Leroy always insisted the book was not a biography but a novel, it relied on a large body of factual research. It won the Prix Goncourt in 2007, one of the most important French literary awards.

== See also ==
- 2007 in literature
- Contemporary French literature
