= The Disciple (novel) =

1889 novel by Paul Bourget

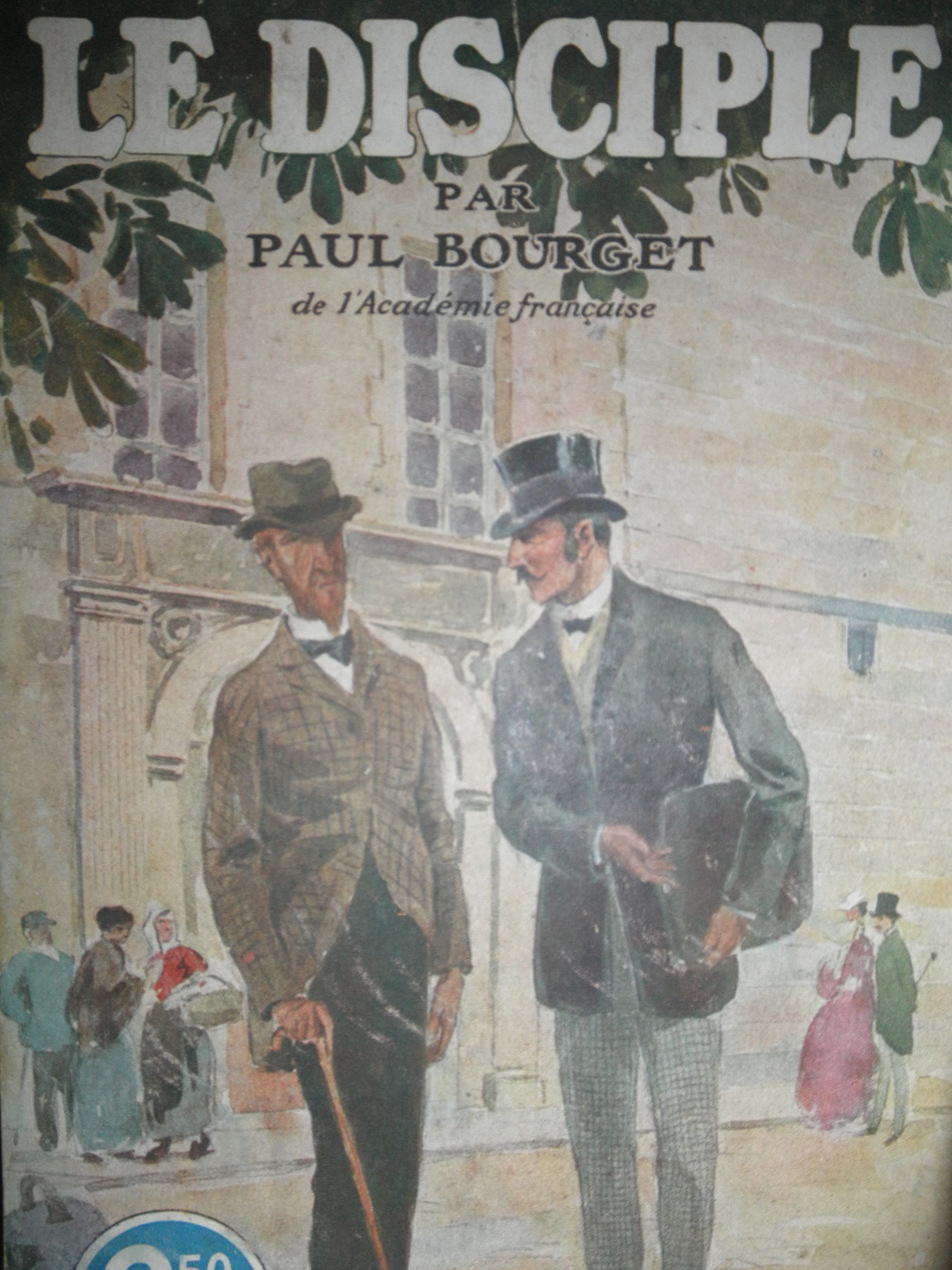
- Author: Paul Bourget
- Original title: Le Disciple
- Language: French
- Genre: Thesis novel
- Published: 1889
- Publisher: Lemerre
- Publication place: France
- Pages: 359

The Disciple (French: Le Disciple) is a novel by Paul Bourget (1852–1935), published in 1889. It was written between September 1888 and May 1889 and serves as an analysis and educational tool for the new generations. Bourget's work is also a thesis novel, as the author criticizes the role of intellectuals and accuses modern science of replacing religion without offering a moral compass.

As a pivotal work in Bourget's literary career, the novel marks the transition from his focus on psychological analysis and social manners to a more moralistic and Catholic-themed approach. Beginning with The Disciple in 1889, Paul Bourget's exploration of faith ultimately led to his conversion in 1901.

By engaging in dual novel forms – the analytical and the thesis – Bourget produced a "hybrid" novel with The Disciple. (Note: The term belongs to Henri Klerkx.) It also signifies a significant shift in the emotional and social life of the novelist: During this period, he gets married and distances himself from his friends (such as Louis Cahen d'Anvers), and his social circle.

== Genesis of the novel ==
=== Chambige affair ===
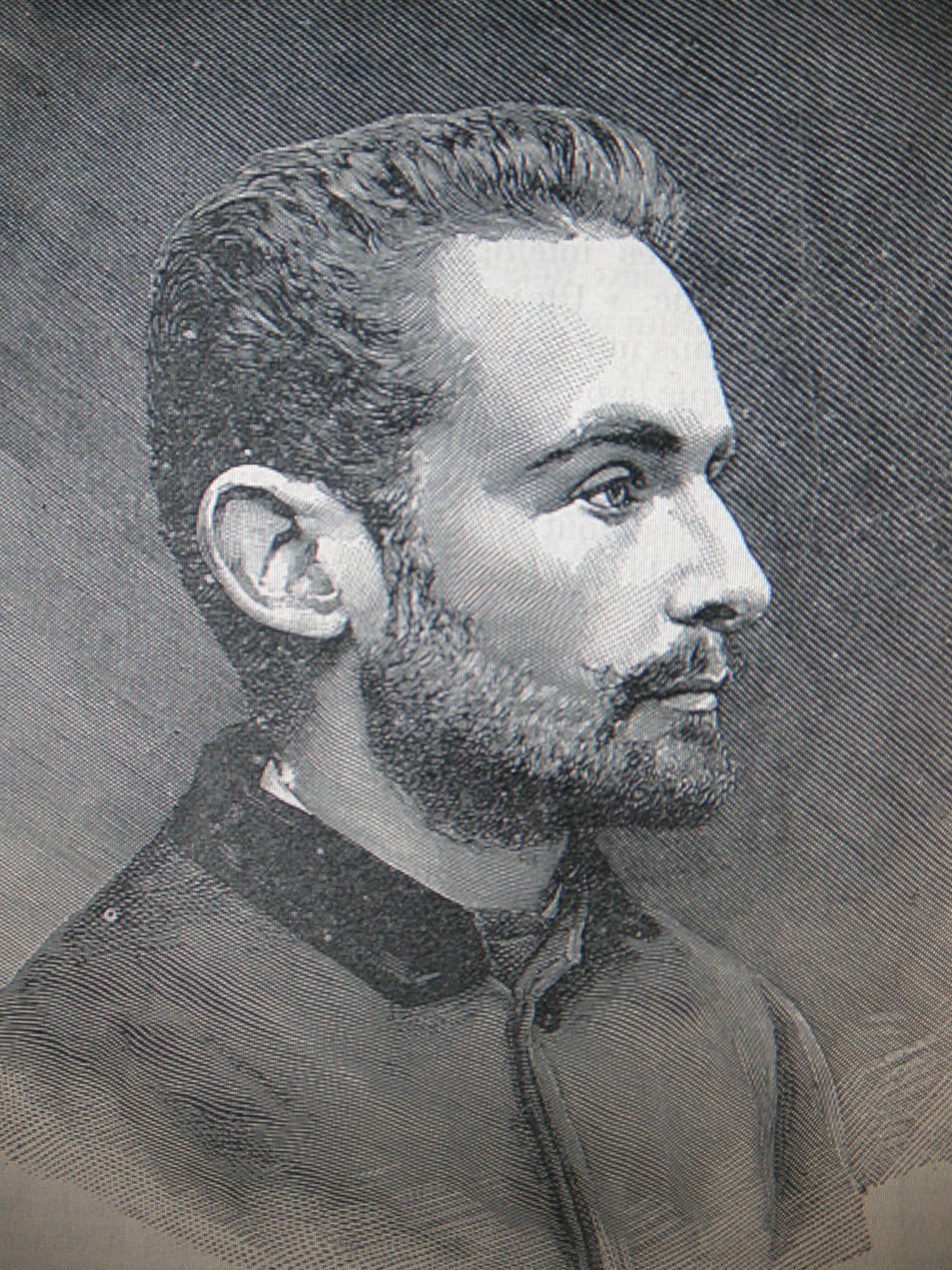
Henri Chambige in 1888 (L'Illustration)

On January 25, 1888, a twenty-two-year-old law student named Henri Chambige was discovered unconscious but alive in a villa in Sidi-Mabrouk, near Constantine. He had been shot twice in the cheek. Next to him lay a thirty-year-old married woman, with several gunshot wounds to her temple. Chambige was accused of murder, claiming that they both intended to end their lives. He admitted to killing her and then attempting suicide. Before the incident, Paul Bourget and Henri Chambige were acquainted, prompting Bourget to consider using the tragedy as inspiration for a novel. He was concerned that modern writers, including himself, might influence young minds negatively. (Note: There have been claims that Bourget was personally involved in the trial, but there is no document to confirm this. Albert Feuillerat, however, points out that the investigation uncovered the influence of fictional literature, including Bourget's works, on Chambige's state of mind.) Bourget conducted thorough research for his novel, consulting press reports, court records, and articles from Le Temps and La Gazette des Tribunaux. He also incorporated viewpoints from writers like Maurice Barrès, published in Le Figaro on November 11, 1888, titled The Sensitivity of Henri Chambige

Throughout his life, Bourget never admitted that he based the character of Greslou on Chambige. (Note: Despite the author's denials, the press suggests that the link between the case and the novel is clear. L'Illustration ironically announced in its "prophetic almanac" section on December 1, 1888, a prediction for January 1889: "Mr. Paul Bourget publishes Physiologie de l’assassinat moderne, with a preface letter by Mr. Henri Chambige [sic].") However, he extensively drew inspiration from the Sidi-Mabrouk affair, leading to a shift in the novel's focus. Originally titled Adrien Sixte, the novel quickly centers around Greslou/Chambige's confession, occupying three-fifths of the volume. The news story of the assize court drama gains significance, evolving into a "great trial of the intellect," with Bourget positioning himself as a moral guide for the new generations.

Bourget also faced criticism for drawing parallels between the mysterious death of Archduke Rudolf and Marie Vetsera at Mayerling and the events in The Disciple.

=== Political context and the boulangism crisis ===
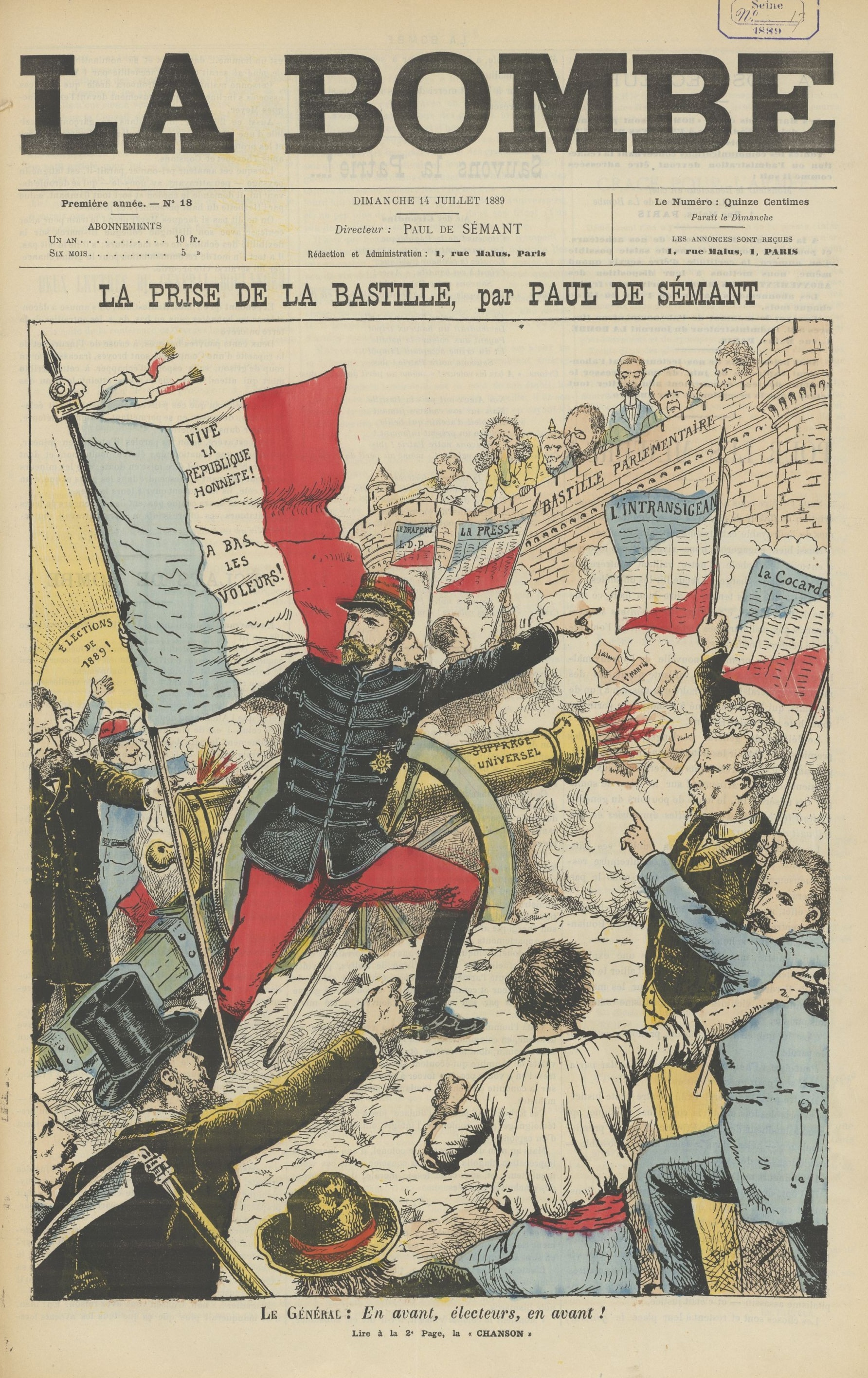
The boulangisme crisis

In 1887, the Third Republic faced significant turmoil as hostility towards the parliamentary system increased after the Daniel Wilson‍–‍decorations scandal of 1887 and the resultant resignation of president Jules Grévy. The threat of General Boulanger to march on Paris added to the tension. Bourget harbored a profound antipathy towards the Republican and Boulangist factions, exhibiting a similar disdain and criticism towards each.

This situation illustrates the "terrifying pessimism" of the novelist, as echoed by Henry Bordeaux in his portrayal of his friend. These events firmly establish the novelist's belief that the Republic is synonymous with wastefulness and that universal suffrage leads to chaos. The novel also subtly praises the monarchy through the character of Count André de Jussat-Randon. Bourget's novels frequently serve as critiques of the Republic. The year after The Disciple was published, Bourget wrote Un cœur de femme, another work that prominently displays his disdain for universal suffrage.

== Manuscript ==
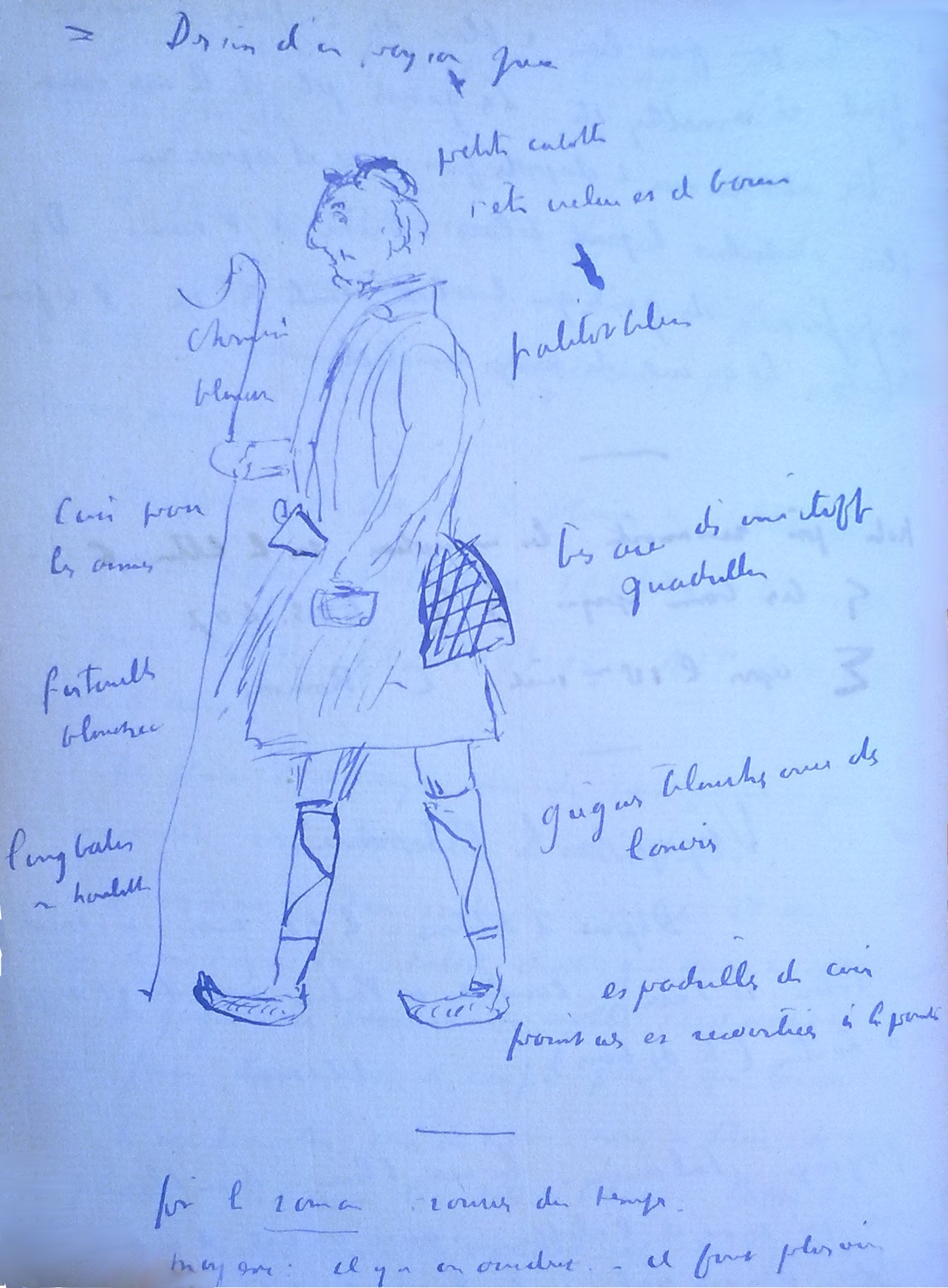
Example of a sketch by Paul Bourget on one of the preparatory manuscripts; here, a self-portrait in Greece

The manuscript of The Disciple was part of the Marquis du Bourg de Bozas library collection for a long time. Until 1891, the author also shared his manuscripts with acquaintances and friends. The marquis was devoted to bibliophilia due to a biographical accident: he was the heir of Charles Baudelaire's lawyer and a bibliophile himself: Gustave Louis Chaix d'Est-Ange. Paul Bourget's will forbade the publication of his unpublished works and diaries ("Hide your life [sic]", said the writer). The original manuscript of this significant work was acquired by the National Library of France in 1996 (through a Drouot sale on November 28, 1996), to enhance the Paul Bourget collection donated in 1989 (Allocation Number of Funds [N.a.f.] 19749 – 19771). (Note: A different date of entry into the national collections of the manuscript is given by Antoine Compagnon: Drouot sale, February 5, 1993. Bourget, Paul (2011). Le Disciple (in French). Le Livre de Poche. ISBN 9782253089698.)

Paul Bourget included preparatory sketches for his novel in this manuscript, providing insight into its genesis. These sketches, contained in a 31 × 23 cm cover, serve as the scaffolding of the novel and aid in its genetic editing. Bourget refers to them as plans and "anatomies." Originally written for the Nouvelle Revue, the draft is divided into sections rather than chapters. The plans and anatomies offer a detailed inventory of the characters' moral traits. However, Bourget struggled with visualizing his characters' physical forms and resorted to drawing their profiles on separate sheets. In the case of the final scene in The Disciple, which involves a technical description of a trial procedure, Bourget wrote the scene in the presence of a deputy to ensure accuracy and avoid procedural errors. (Note: The final pages of the last part of The Disciple are attached, according to Michel Mansuy, to a copy of the novel that belonged to Geneviève Halévy, the wife of Émile Strauss. This copy is currently housed at the Bibliothèque Nationale (reserve) under the number 8° Z Don 595 (190).)

== Summary ==
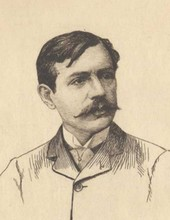
Paul Bourget in 1880, etching by Robert Kastor

In 1885, the philosopher Adrien Sixte was visited by a twenty-year-old man, Robert Greslou, who presented him with a high-quality manuscript. Initially enthusiastic about the atheism of the deterministic psychologist Sixte, Robert Greslou goes to Auvergne to work as a tutor for the Marquis de Jussat-Randon. He tries to apply his master's experimental method to Charlotte de Jussat, a young virgin from the Auvergne nobility.

Two years later, the marquis's daughter, who was in love with the young man, realized that their relationship was merely a scientific experiment for the young tutor and devoid of genuine love. She took her own life by consuming the poison that her lover had purchased. Robert Greslou was accused of her murder and subsequently imprisoned. He chose to remain silent and did not defend himself against the accusation. While in his cell, he wrote a lengthy confession to Adrien Sixte, presented as a flashback, which forms the novel's first part. The judge, questioning the extent to which the philosopher's influence may have corrupted his disciple's moral compass, summoned the thinker for further inquiry.

Initially, Adrien Sixte's first reaction is to absolve himself, but as he reads his disciple's confession, he ends up recognizing that the young student did find in his works the reasons that led him to act in this way. Greslou, wanting to make amends to Charlotte's brother, rushes towards him, but Count André de Jussat, following the moral code of honor, executes the young student.

== Characters ==
=== Adrien Sixte ===
Adrien Sixte, a thinker, scientist, and monist like Hippolyte Taine, challenges the existence of matter. He is also a psychologist, following in the footsteps of Théodule Ribot, and drawing inspiration from Émile Littré. The philosopher Sixte dedicates his life to his ideas, rejecting religious compromises. However, he acknowledges his writings may have influenced Greslou's tragic decision when questioned by the examining judge. Ultimately, he reconsiders his stance on religion in the final pages of the narrative.

=== Robert Greslou ===
Robert Greslou, a disciple of Adrien Sixte, is the novel's central character. He is a depraved, young intellectual who has lost faith and converted to deterministic theories. Bourget seeks to discredit him in the eyes of a certain youth. He instills in Charlotte love and then the vertigo of destruction. Greslou is lucid and mocks moral and social values such as Good, Evil, Homeland, and Justice. His influences include Alfred de Musset, who instilled doubt in him; Stendhal, who presented the unsettling example of Julien Sorel; and even Spinoza, who provided troubling justification for Greslou's negative tendencies.

=== Count André de Jussat ===
Charlotte de Jussat's brother is a cavalry officer who is noble, royalist, and Catholic. During a dramatic event, Robert Greslou switches allegiances from his former master, Adrien Sixte, an atheist and determinist, to the cavalry captain, who is expected to embody virtue, honor, and righteousness.

== Literary technique ==
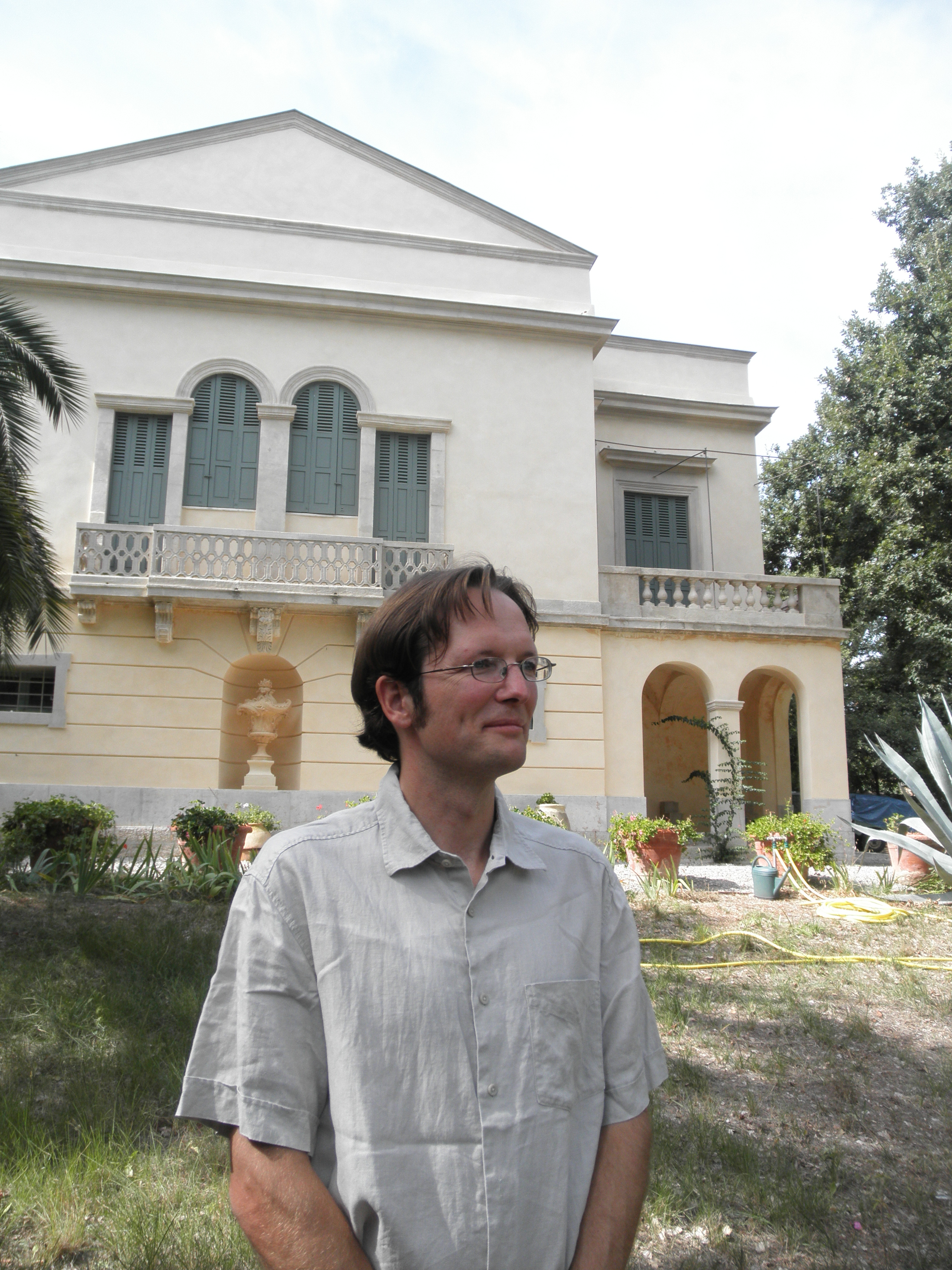
Richard Hibbitt, British researcher and academic, at the Plantier de Costebelle, the Hyères home of writer Paul Bourget, in September 2010

In the early 20th century, a debate between Paul Bourget and Albert Thibaudet centered on the definition of the novel. Bourget, the author of The Disciple, championed the traditional French novel structure, emphasizing the importance of a coherent plot that unfolds through a series of episodes. According to Bourget, each passage in the novel should contribute to the overall outcome, "showcasing a deep understanding of the characters' inner thoughts." The characters in the novel are "carefully selected and strategically utilized to drive the narrative" towards its conclusion.

However, nuances must be brought to this model of the novel as an intellectual demonstration. Indeed, although The Disciple is an edifying novel that informs about the dangers of masterful thinking, Bourget skillfully employs narrative suspense. Despite its didactic tendencies, he is a "remarkable storytellerand an undisputed master of intrigue." This quality allows the novel to be considered an "entertaining" work, as stated by Richard Hibbitt. Hibbitt believes that this dichotomy between a didactic and an exciting novel (Greslou's death is an exciting plot) is due to the influence of Honoré de Balzac. (Note: Richard Hibbitt, a Lecturer in the Department of French at the University of Leeds, highlights Bourget's admiration for Balzac and the significance of his encounter with Le Père Goriot at the age of 15. Following his essay on Paul Bourget in Romanesque et Histoire (2008), Hibbitt further delved into the themes of cosmopolitanism and decadence in a study published in 2010.) In Nouvelles Pages de critique et de doctrine, the author underscores the significance of this "hybridity of the novel," which is attributable to the convergence of multiple elements, including history, customs, passions, and psychology. He posits that in all of his narratives, these two seemingly contradictory elements: "The fervor of sensibility and the rigor of the scientific thinker—blend harmoniously. Wasn't his genius also a hybrid, composed entirely of irreconcilable faculties?"

The literary technique, borrowed from Balzacian novels, incorporates a blend of history and the "romantic" motif of the power of passion, (as explored in Greslou's study). This duality is reflected in the characters of the narrative: Robert Greslou's initial work, which garners Adrien Sixte's admiration, is a manuscript titled Contribution à la multiplicité du Moi. In his reflections, Sixte ponders whether Greslou harbors a hidden sense of duality, embodying two states or beings within himself.

== Themes developed in the novel ==
=== Education of the new generations through the psychological novel ===
The Disciple is preceded by a lengthy preface with nationalist undertones, directed towards the youth: "Young man of my country, to you, whom I know so well (and of whom I know nothing) except that you are between eighteen and twenty-five, and that you are seeking answers to the questions that trouble you in our volumes." Bourget further addresses the youth, stating, "And the answers found in these volumes depend somewhat on your moral life, somewhat on your soul; -and your moral life is the moral life of France itself; your soul is its soul." In this preface, Paul Bourget urges the young man of 1889 to reflect on Greslou's journey and implores them to "contribute to the restoration of the recently diminished homeland."

=== Responsibility of the mastermind through the thesis novel ===
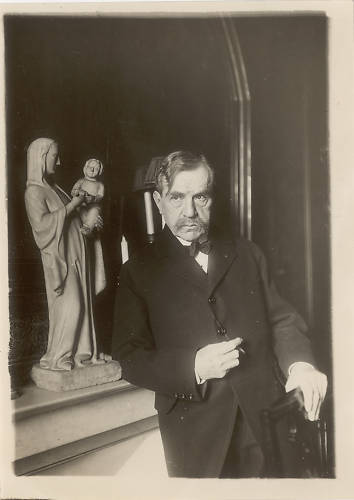
Paul Bourget, circa 1920

In The Disciple written shortly after Bourget's Physiologie de l'amour moderne in 1889, moral concerns take center stage. Bourget explores the question of responsibility, focusing on the impact of a writer or philosopher's work on society. "Few works of this nature," notes Victor Giraud, a contemporary of Paul Bourget, "have had such an impact on minds, souls, and consciences, have caused such a shake-up." According to Jean-Christophe Coulot, "constructed according to a rigorous dramatic progression, this novel illustrates Bourget's concern about evil, through the responsibility of a philosophical work on the mind of a young student." He adds that this novel constitutes more than "two hundred pages of experimental psychology conducted methodically."

If The Disciple is considered the first novel of the "second" Paul Bourget, he had already introduced key notions in Mensonges (published 1887) through the character Father Taconet, such as the responsibility of guides of human thought, the superiority of action, and salvation through pity and faith. In this novel, Paul Bourget, positioned as one of the "sons of Taine between science and morality," achieves a significant spiritual reinterpretation of positivism. The central figure in the novel is the philosopher Adrien Sixte, who serves as the mentor to the disciple, Robert Greslou. The tragic journey of Greslou, a young student tutor at the Marquis de Jussat who turns into a murderer, unfolds throughout the narrative. Greslou, hailing from a humble background, struggles to grasp the abstract knowledge of the esteemed scholar, emphasizing the rejection of the prophetic scientist in favor of a "paradigm of responsibility." According to George Steiner, who offers an analysis of The Disciple, the novel delves into the moral responsibility of masters and teachers, exploring the concept of "intellectual abuse" in a broader context.

=== Reconciliation of science and religion ===
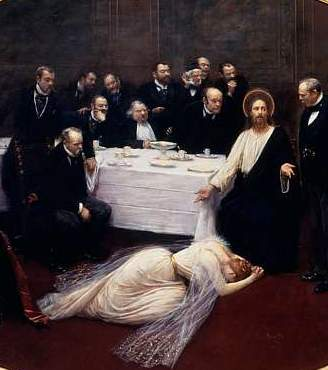
La Madeleine chez le pharisien by Jean Béraud, 1891 (Ernest Renan is in the center)

The philosophy of the ancient scholar Adrien Sixte, influenced by the positivist Ernest Renan, is not flawed but rather limited in its ability "to address moral issues." Salvation, according to this perspective, lies not in science but in an optimistic interpretation of the unknown.

On 1 November 1888, Bourget proposed in The Disciple that to truly engage with moral life, one must have a connection with God. He emphasized the belief that the seemingly obscure world around us holds a deeper meaning that resonates with our souls. By highlighting the dangers of rigid positivism and its potential to undermine spiritual beliefs, Bourget emerges as a champion of religious sentiment.

A painting by Jean Béraud depicts the conflict between science and religion during a dinner where Parisian figures are seated with Christ, portrayed as Simon the Pharisee. Renan, a critic of the Church, and other positivists observe the Magdalene in a state of doubt about Christ's teachings (opposite). Similarly, Adrien Sixte, a proponent of deterministic psychology and a staunch denier, is shocked by his realization of responsibility for the death of Charlotte de Jussat, leading him to turn to prayer.

Bourget does not sacrifice science for religion; he confines the former to the realm of the knowable and the latter to the realm of the Unknown. This concept of the "Unknown" represents the culmination of ten years of reflection for the novelist. As early as 1880, he delved into Herbert Spencer's work, Premiers Principes, which discusses the distinction between the knowable and the Unknown, offering a way to reconcile epistemology with a certain mysticism. In Bourget's work, this duality does not reject science in favor of religion. Instead, it showcases the collision of the two aspects of the novelist: "his mind, shaped by science, and his soul, shaped by faith."

== Reception ==
=== Literary event ===
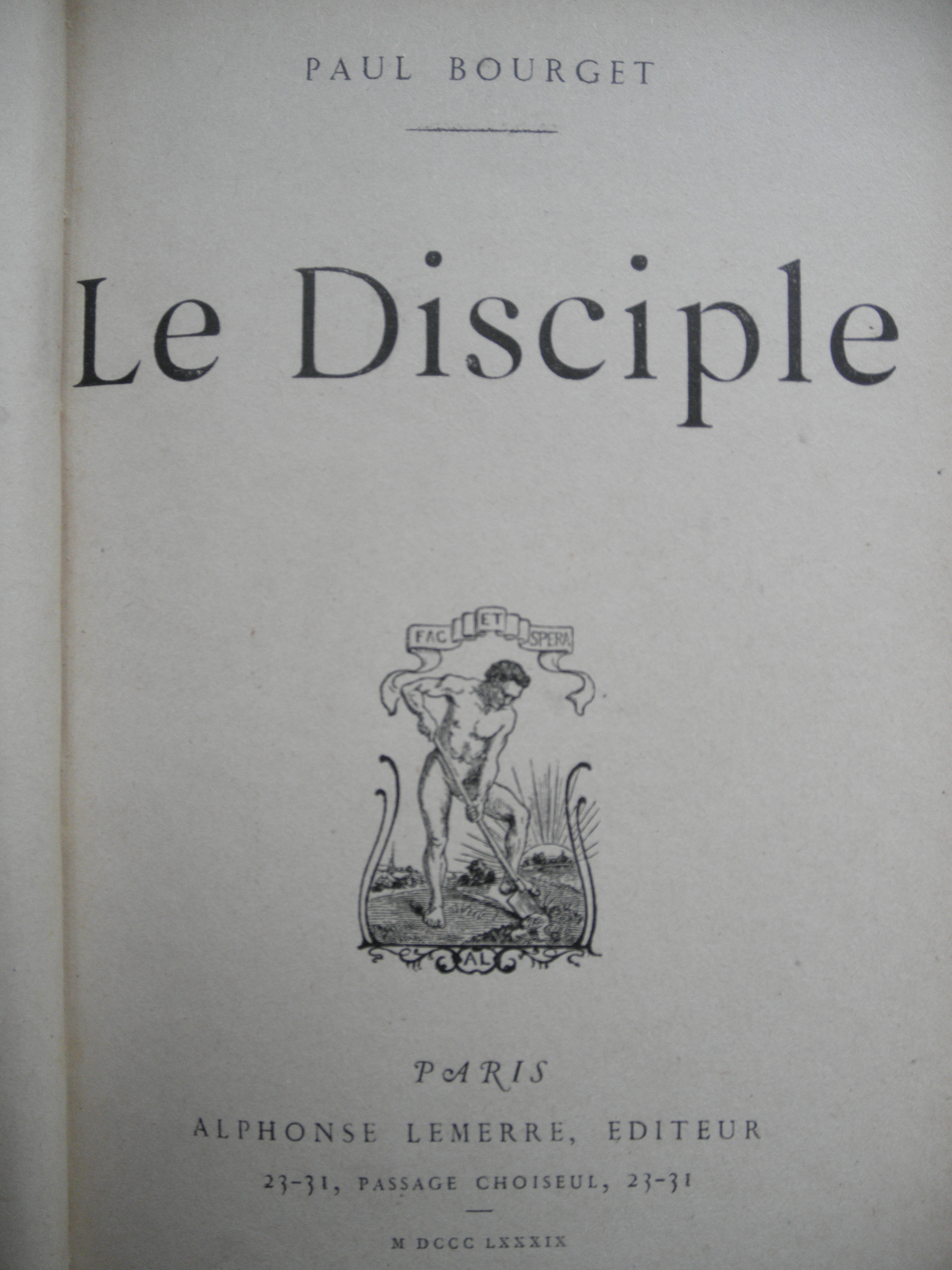
Title page from the original edition of The Disciple, published by Alphonse Lemerre in 1889

The Disciple achieved immediate success, with Alphonse Lemerre selling 22,000 copies in just six weeks. Critics unanimously hailed the novel as a "literary event" (Le Gaulois), a "first-rate book" (Les Débats), a "powerful work that revolutionizes France" (La Nouvelle Revue), "one of the masterpieces of our language" (La Revue bleue), and "the most beautiful and manly of novels" (Polybiblion). (Note: Other critics consider The Disciple to be a novel intended to be read by men.) The preface of the novel, a profound moral lesson and warning, garnered significant attention from critics, with Le Figaro publishing it in its June 17, 1889 issue.

When Hippolyte Taine came across the book, he felt a strong connection to the character of Adrien Sixte. The emotional impact of reading The Disciple prompted him to write a heartfelt letter to Paul Bourget on September 29, 1889. In the preface to the reissue of The Disciple by Nelson Editions in 1910, Théodore de Wyzewa reflects on the novel's impact on the writers of his time:

We were informed that Mr. Paul Bourget echoed our cherished beliefs, with a strong emphasis on the supremacy of art above all else. The principle formerly known as 'art for art's sake' remained our guiding light, unaltered by time. We staunchly upheld the view that artists, particularly writers, should not be preoccupied with the moral implications or real-world impact of their creations.

Each of us had the impression that Mr. Bourget, the author of audacious studies on contemporary psychology and a disenchanted ironist, shared our proud indifference towards what we perceived as a base "bourgeois" reality.

What once outraged us as a sacrilegious attack on the eternal sovereignty of thought and art, we now all agree to embrace, and we almost feel as if we have always accepted it. However, it is to Mr. Bourget's Disciple that the credit belongs for teaching it to us.

— Le Disciple, preface by Théodore de Wyzewa.

=== Disciple's quarrel ===
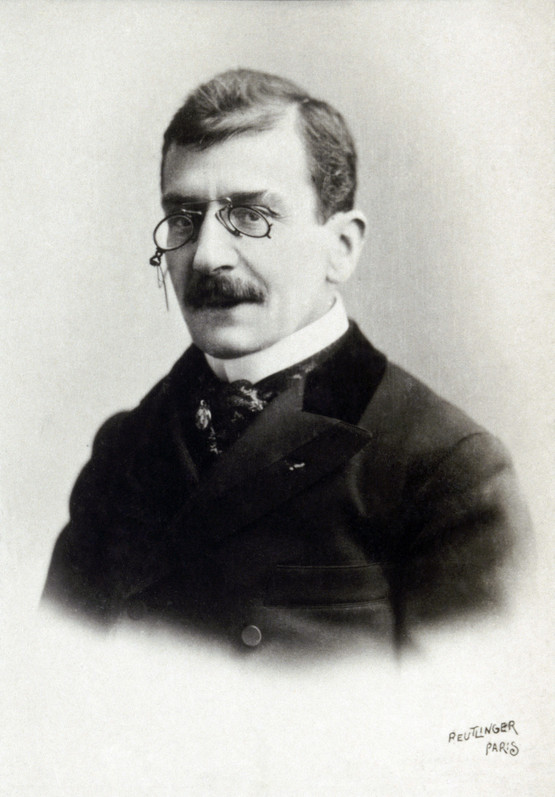
Ferdinand Brunetière, morality and tradition

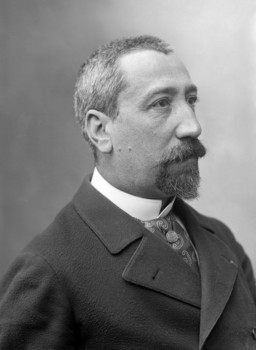
Anatole France, freethinking

The publication of The Disciple sparked a significant debate between advocates of free thought, represented by Anatole France, who challenged the traditionalist interpretation of the work and prioritized science, and supporters of morality and tradition, led by Ferdinand Brunetière, who emphasized the importance of morality over human thought. "Discredit of morality or discredit of science: these are the two total impressions that this book leaves"(Hippolyte Taine, 1889).

However, as noted by Édouard Rod in 1891, "Paul Bourget's development has been so rapid that the new man was born in him before the old man had finished perishing. Therefore, if the preface of The Disciple is the work of the former, the novel itself is still largely of the latter [...] Mr. Bourget's case is therefore quite singular; it is not only that of a rapid development that, in a few years, has brought a writer to the extreme opposite of the goal he seemed to be pursuing; it is that of a conflict between two beings who share a single conscience and dispute it. This conflict is painful and contributes greatly to the troubled impression that books like The Disciple give off, not only because of their subject but because of the uncertainty of mind, the vacillations of soul they betray in the author."

== Legacy ==
By addressing the issue of the writer's responsibility, The Disciple emerged as a significant work in the early twentieth century, resonating with a generation of converted writers who sought to challenge the notion that "what is immoral cannot be true." Bourget's alignment with the Church's doctrine, which rejects the idea that all beliefs are valid, was evident during his dispute with Anatole France, as championed by Ferdinand Brunetière. The concept that truth is determined by its societal impact, advocated by philosopher George Fonsegrive, reflects the influence of La Mennais. The period following the Falloux law (1850), which liberalized Catholic education, created a conducive environment for conversions until the late 1880s when The Disciple was published in 1889.

The themes of the guilt of the scientist and the crisis of values in the modern world continue to be explored in Italian literature. Influenced by his friendships and travels to France, Gabriele D'Annunzio found inspiration Bourget's The Disciple for his work Il trionfo della morte, published 1894.

The novel was adapted into a radio serial in 1960 under the title L'Affaire Greslou.
