= History of Shit =

Book by Dominique Laporte

- Author: Dominique Laporte
- Original title: Histoire de la merde
- Cover artist: Roland Topor
- Language: French
- Publisher: C. Bourgois
- Publication date: 1978
- Pages: 119 pp
- ISBN: 978-2-267-00109-9
- OCLC: 4438456

History of Shit (Histoire de la merde) is a 1978 book by French psychoanalyst Dominique Laporte (1949–1984). It uses an idiosyncratic method of historical genealogy derived from, among others, Friedrich Nietzsche, Sigmund Freud, Georges Bataille, and Michel Foucault, to show how the development of sanitation techniques in Western Europe affected the formation of modern notions of individuality. Laporte examines this influence through the historical processes of urbanization, the apotheosis of nationalism, practices of capitalist exchange, and linguistic reform.

== Translation ==
In the English translation of the book by Nadia Benabid and Rodolphe el-Khoury in 1993, el-Khoury explains how for Laporte, "the history of shit becomes the history of subjectivity" and how his book becomes "a prehistory to modernity and the modern subject" (viii) El-Khoury identifies in the introduction of the book Laporte's scholarly strategy of joining the ridiculous and the profound as inherently political. Laporte's stated ambition is to "remove a few masks with the roar of our laughter, laugh them off the figures of power" (ix). The critic added these words to his ideas about the book:

“According to Freud, the decline of the olfactory sense was an inevitable outgrowth of the civilizing process, set in motion when man adopted an erect posture. From that point, he argues, “the chain of events would have proceeded through the devaluation of the olfactory stimuli and the isolation of the menstrual period to the time when visual stimuli were paramount and the genitals became visible and thence to the continuity of sexual excitation, the founding of the family and so to the threshold of civilization.”Laporte’s History of Shit is consistent with Freud’s general outline insofar as it recognizes the decline of the olfactory, exploits the tensions between the private nose and the public eye, and situates a historical turning point at the founding of the family.”

== See also ==
- French writers
- Psychoanalysts
- Schools of psychoanalysis
