= Paul-Laurent Assoun =

French psychoanalyst

Paul-Laurent Assoun (born 1948) is a former student of the École normale supérieure de Saint-Cloud. His 1987 dissertation, Idéologie politique et lutte de classes dans le discours historiographique du "fatalisme historique" en France sous la Restauration was supervised by Georges Lavau.

== Career ==
Psychoanalyst and Professor at the université de Paris VII where he founded the department of clinical human science (until the end of 2007), he is a member of the UMR CNRS psychoanalysis and social practice. From 1987-1993, he taught social and political philosophy at the Radboud University Nijmegen. Paul-Laurent Assoun is also the director of the Philosophie d'aujourd'hui collection of Presses universitaires de France, Psychoanalysis and social practice at Anthropos/Economica and a member of the editing committee of the psychoanalytic review penser/rêver (éditions de l'Olivier).

== Works ==
- Freud, la philosophie et les philosophes, PUF, 1976 2e éd. Quadrige, 2005, ISBN 2-13-054912-8
- Freud et Nietzsche, PUF, 1978, rééd. Quadrige: 1998, ISBN 2-13-049123-5
- Hedendaagse Franse Filosofen, réd. Assoun et al., Van Gorcum, 1987, ISBN 978-90-232-2259-0
- Le freudisme, PUF-Que sais-je, 1990, ISBN 978-90-5352-095-6
- Freud et Wittgenstein, PUF-Quadrige, 1996, ISBN 2-13-047456-X
- Introduction à la métapsychologie freudienne, Ed.: PUF-Quadrige, 1993, ISBN 2-13-045248-5
- Lacan, PUF 2003
- Le Couple inconscient : amour freudien et passion post-courtoise, Anthropos/Economica 2004
- Le fétichisme, PUF-Que sais-je, 2002, ISBN 2-13-053043-5
- Freud, la philosophie et les philosophes, Quadrige 2005
- Leçons psychanalytiques sur les phobies, Anthropos/Economica 2005
- Psychanalyse, Ed.: PUF-Quadrige, 2007, ISBN 2-13-056012-1
- (postface) François Ansermet, Maria-Grazia Sorrentino, Malaise dans l'institution: Le soignant et son désir, Ed.: Economica; 2007,ISBN 2-7178-5397-9
