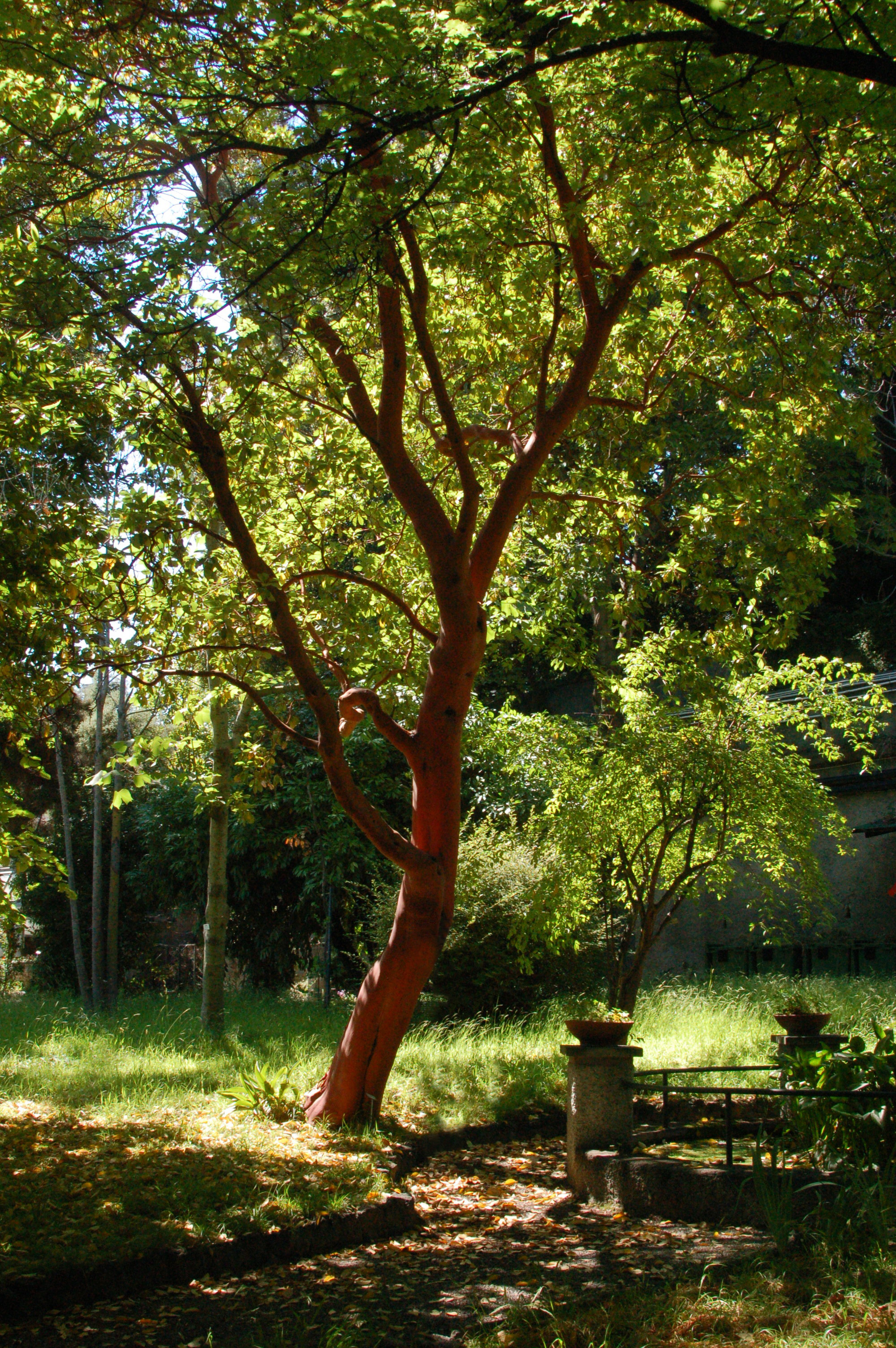
- Tree of Arbutus andrachne at Orto Botanico dell'Università di Genova

Scientific classification
- Kingdom: Plantae
- Clade: Embryophytes
- Clade: Tracheophytes
- Clade: Angiosperms
- Clade: Eudicots
- Clade: Asterids
- Order: Ericales
- Family: Ericaceae
- Genus: Arbutus
- Species: A. andrachne

Binomial name
- Arbutus andrachne L.
- Distribution map.

Synonyms
- Andrachne frutescens Ehret; Arbutus idaea Gand.; Arbutus integrifolia Lam.; Arbutus integrifolia Sieber ex Klotzsch; Arbutus lucida Steud.; Arbutus serratifolia Lodd.; Arbutus sieberi Klotzsch

= Arbutus andrachne =

Species of flowering plant in the heather family

Arbutus andrachne, commonly called the Greek strawberry tree, is an evergreen shrub or small tree in the family Ericaceae, native to the Mediterranean region and the Middle East.

== Description ==
Arbutus andrachne can reach a height of about 12 metres (39 ft). The smooth bark exfoliates during the summer, leaving a layer with a pistachio green colour, which changes gradually to an orange brown. The flowers bloom in spring and are white or yellowish green.

Its fruits ripen in autumn. Their size is 1-1.2 cm. They are edible and taste somewhat sweet and astringent, rich in vitamin C, polyphenols, and natural sugars(16gr/100gr of fruit). The astringency is more pronounced when the fruit is not fully ripe. They are used to make jams and liqueurs. When left to dry in a cool place, are eaten as sweet, chewy candy.

== Taxonomy ==
The etymology of the species name corresponds to the Ancient Greek word ἀνδράχνη (andrákhnē), meaning "wild strawberry", and refers to the common name of the tree and to its fruits.

== Horticulture ==
Arbutus andrachne was reported by Peter Collinson as having flowered first in England in Dr John Fothergill's extensive botanical garden and greenhouses at Upton House, Essex (now West Ham Park), in 1765.

=== Hybrids ===
- Arbutus x andrachnoides Link, 1821 is a hybrid between A. andrachne and A. unedo.
- Arbutus x thuretiana Demoly, nothosp. nov. is a hybrid between A. andrachne and A. canariensis. Named after Gustave Thuret, it is naturalised at Jardin botanique de la Villa Thuret. A. x thuretiana is renowned for its perfectly smooth, reddish-brown bark, exfoliating in the spring to show a new, surprisingly pistachio-green bark, which gradually darkens and turns reddish again.

== Uses ==
According to a research study published in 2017, the fruit's antioxidants contain a variety of chemicals that have a defensive effect against memory impairment where the antioxidants normalize the long- and short-term memory impairment caused from sleep deprivation.

== In culture ==
A book about travel in the Middle East states of 15th-century travel writer Bertrandon de la Broquière:

On leaving Bursa ... There was on the road a small tree bearing a fruit somewhat bigger than our largest cherries, and of the shape and taste of strawberries, but a little acid. It is pleasant to eat; but, if a great quantity be eaten, it mounts to the head, and intoxicates. It is ripe in November and December." Editor's footnote: "From the description, it seems to be the arbutus Andrachne.

The tree is part of the flora of the Dibbeen Forest Reserve in Jordan.

== Gallery ==
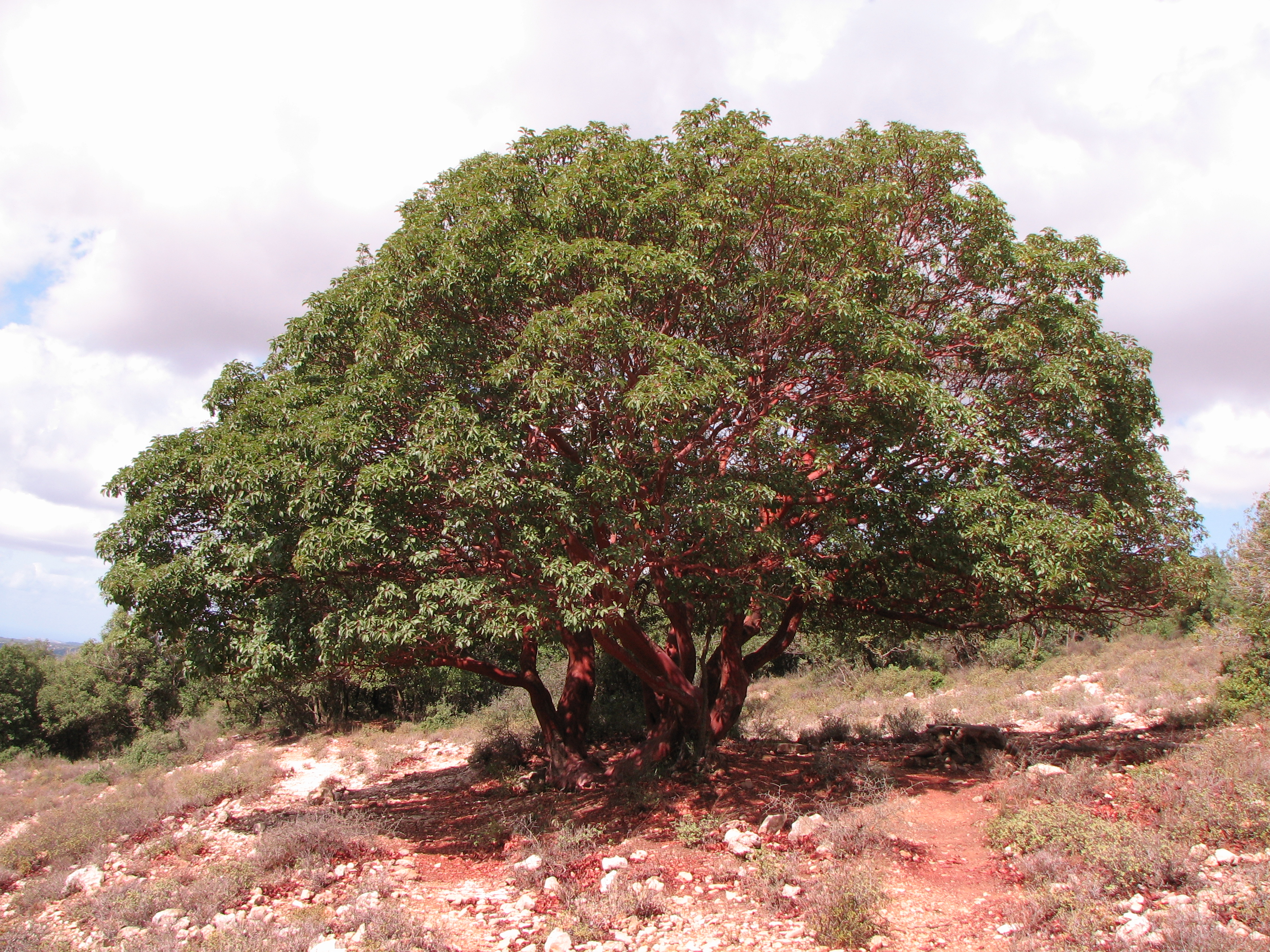
Plant of Arbutus andrachne

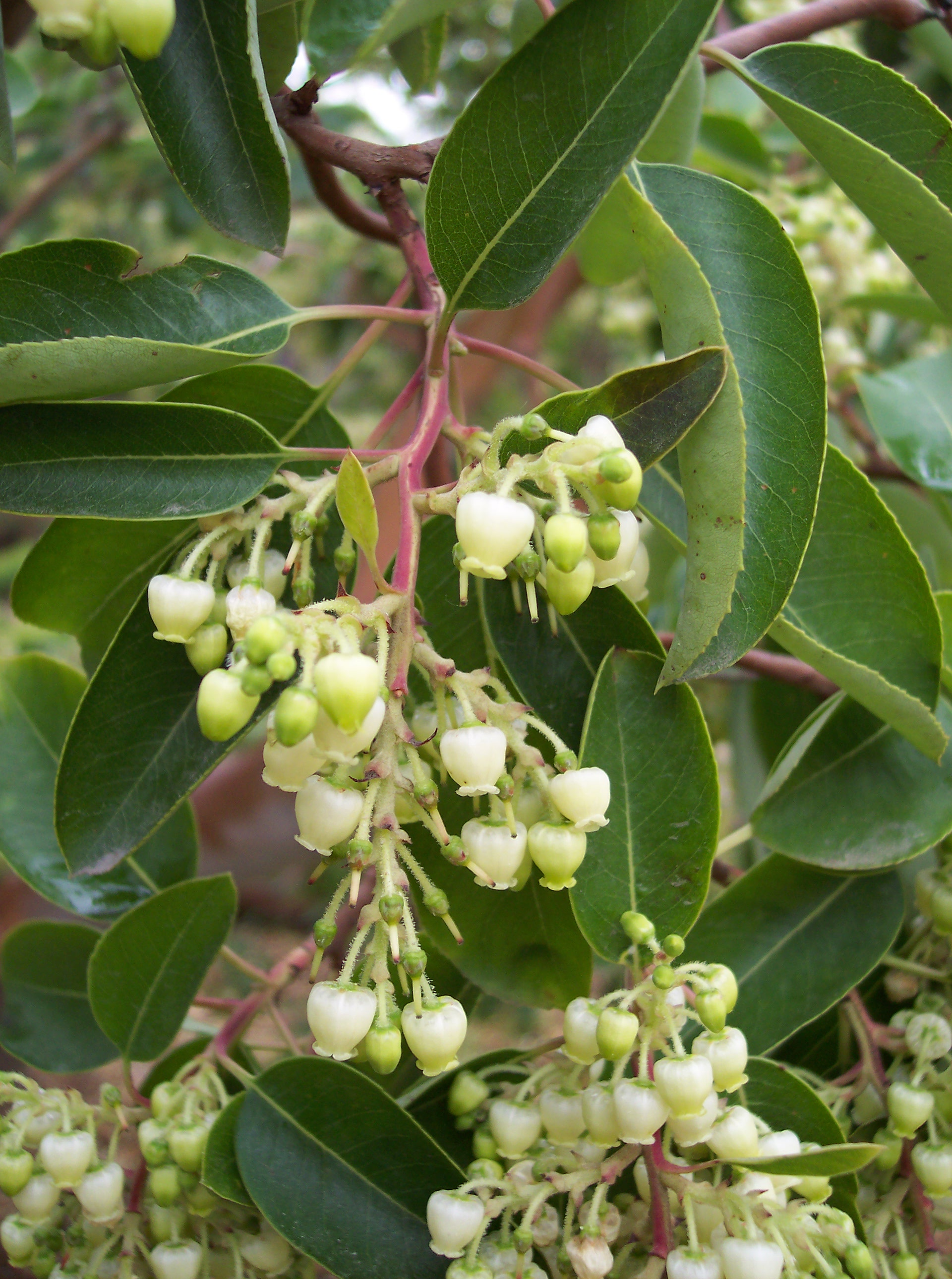
Flowers and leaves

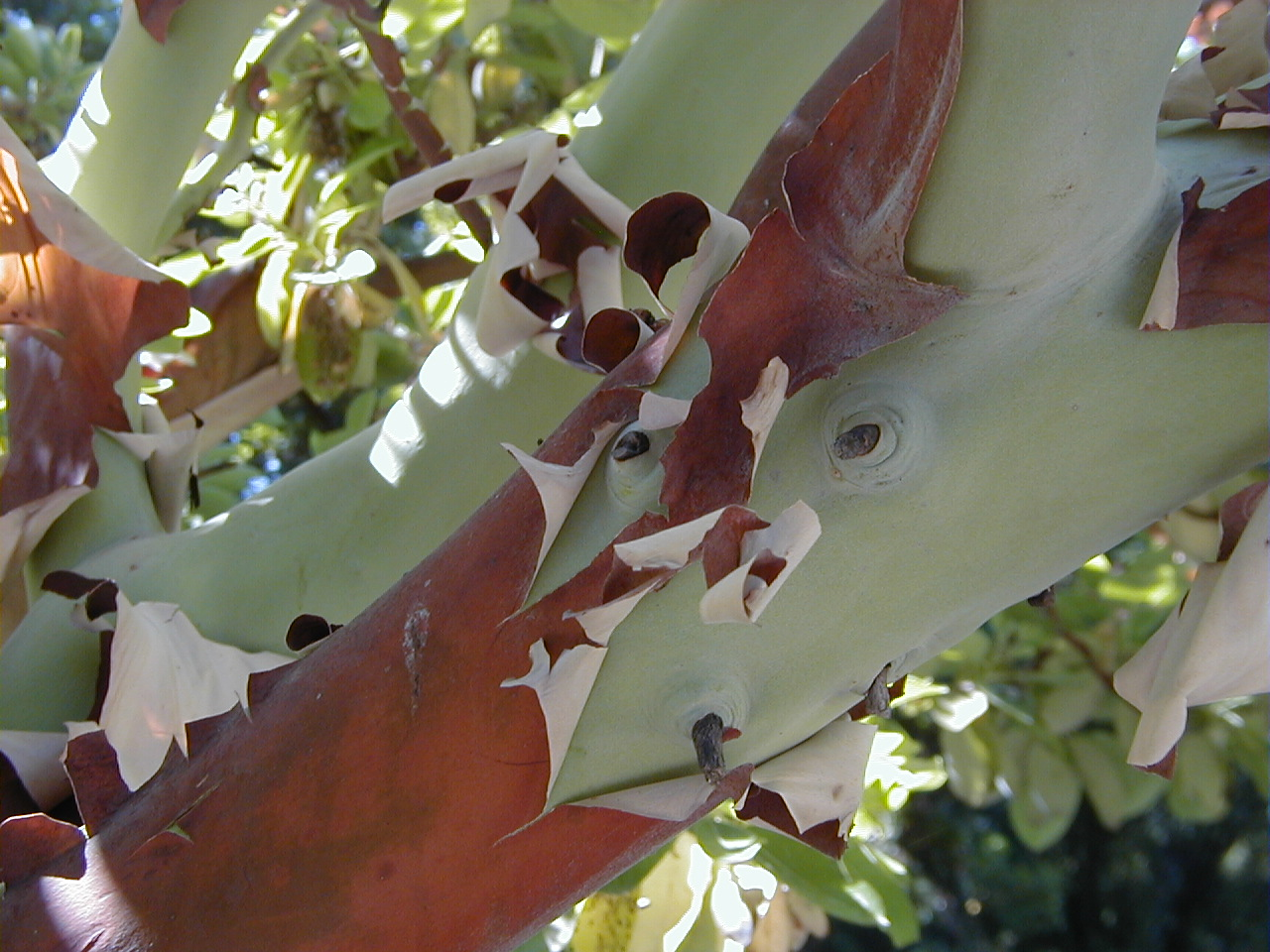
Bark

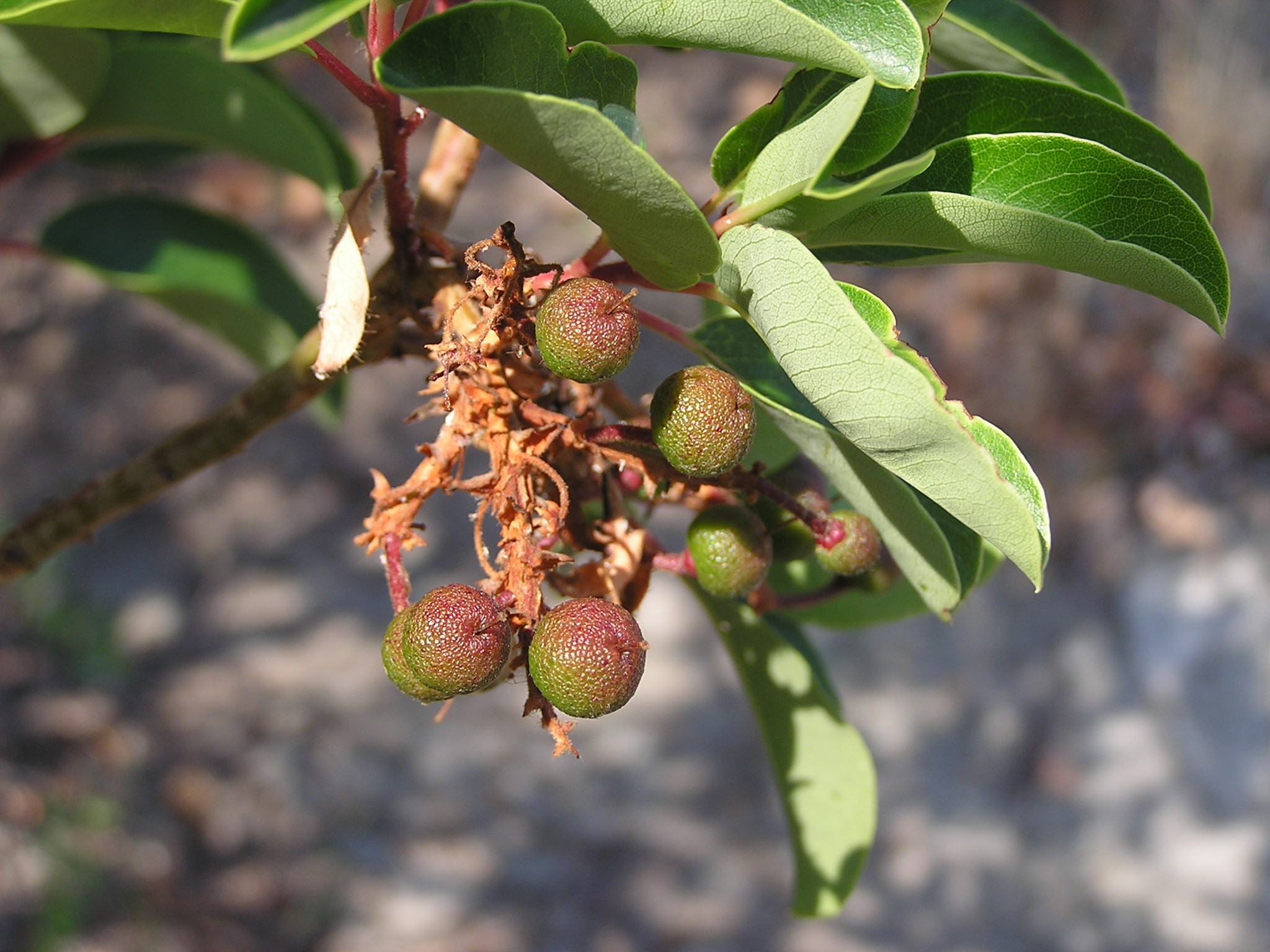
Fruits

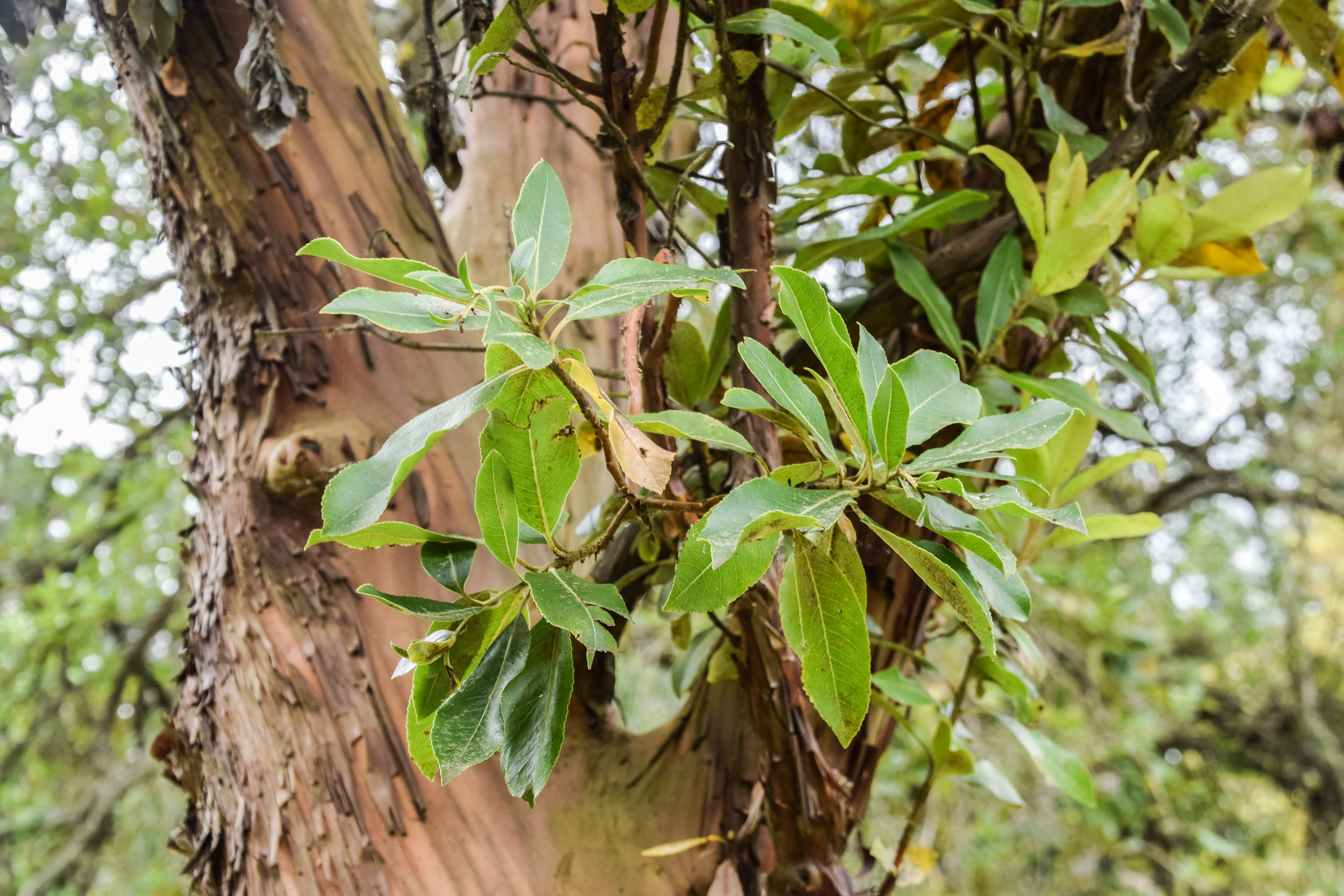
The hybrid Arbutus x andrachnoides

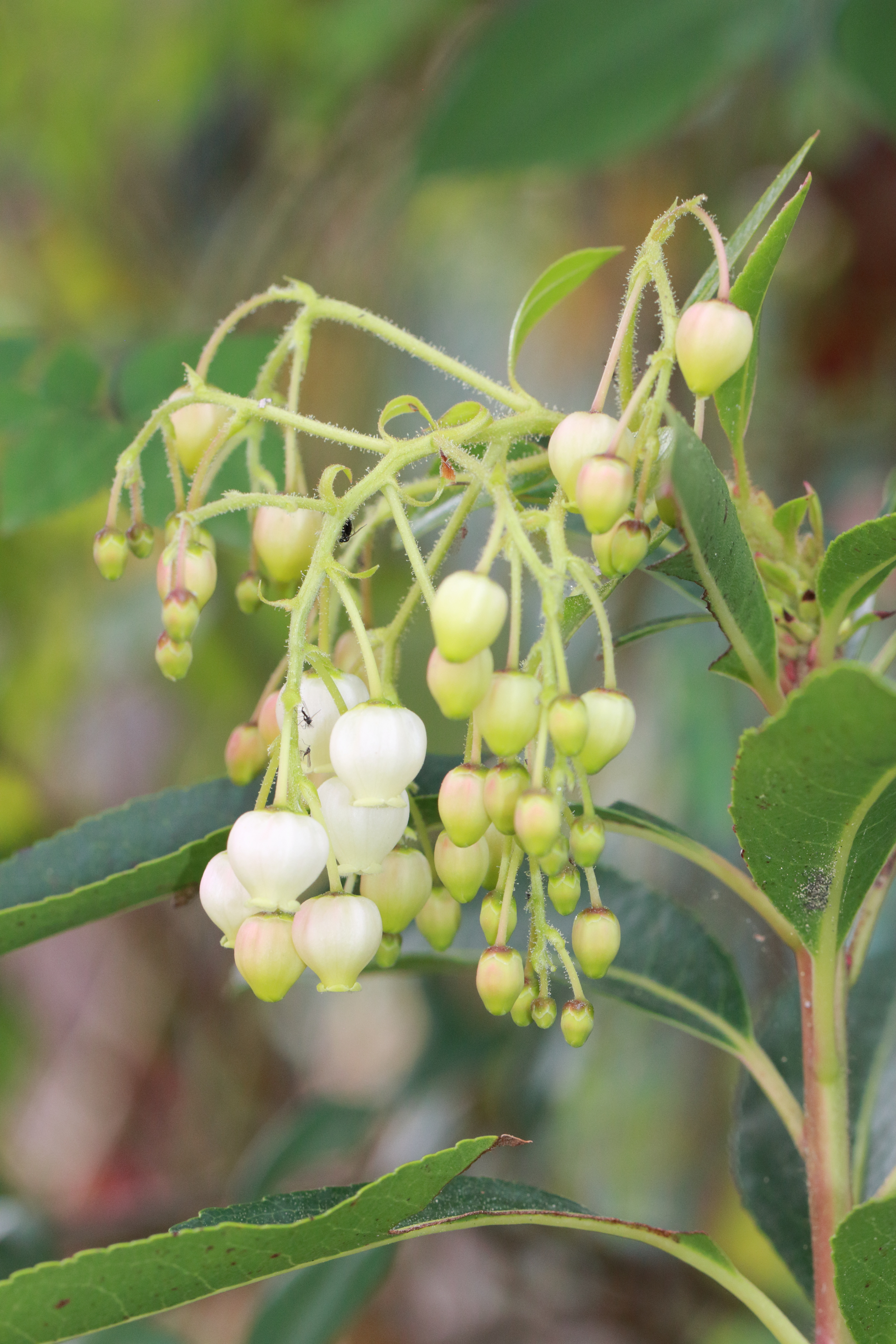
The hybrid Arbutus x thuretiana

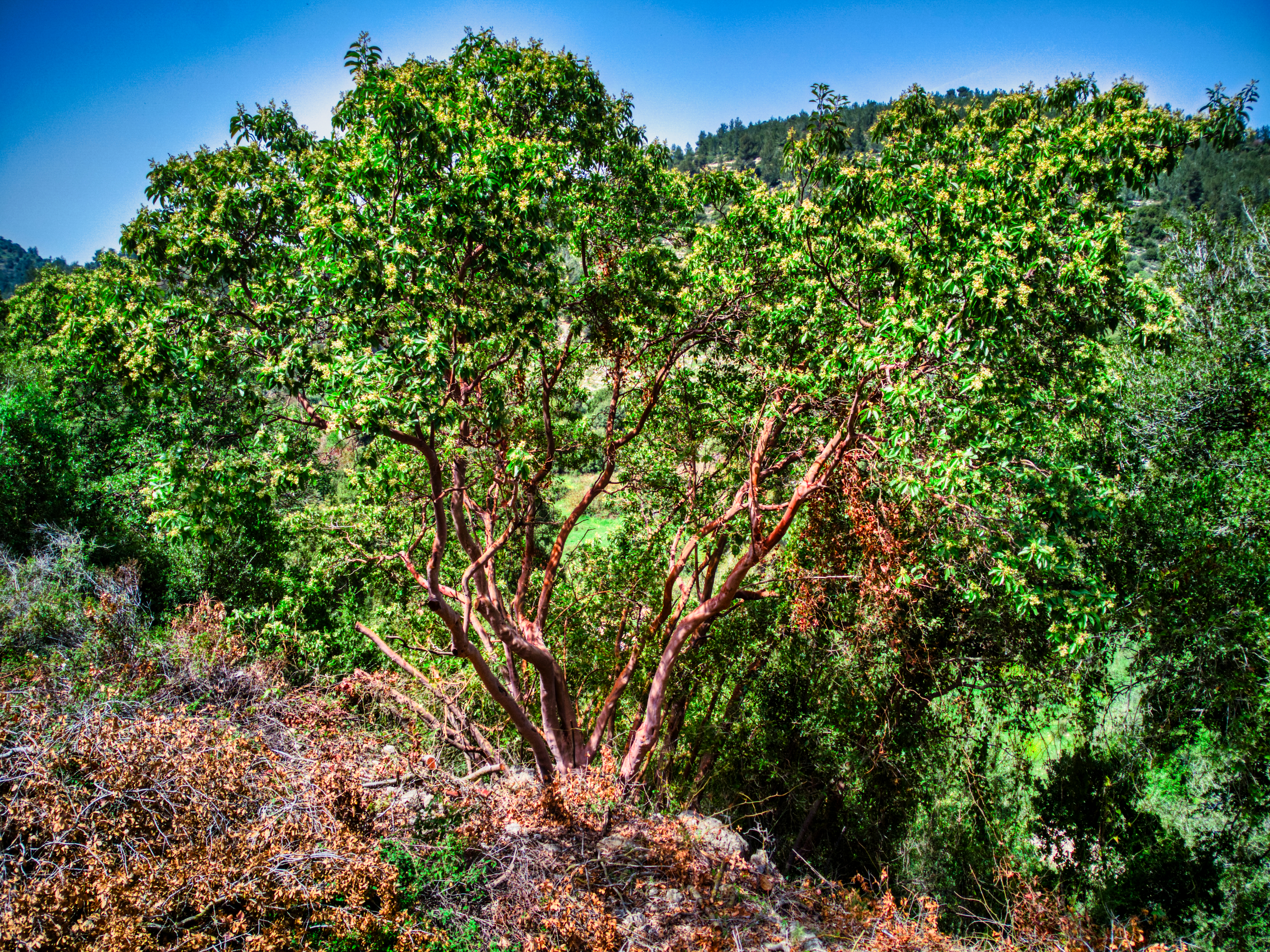
Arbutus andrachne In Israel
