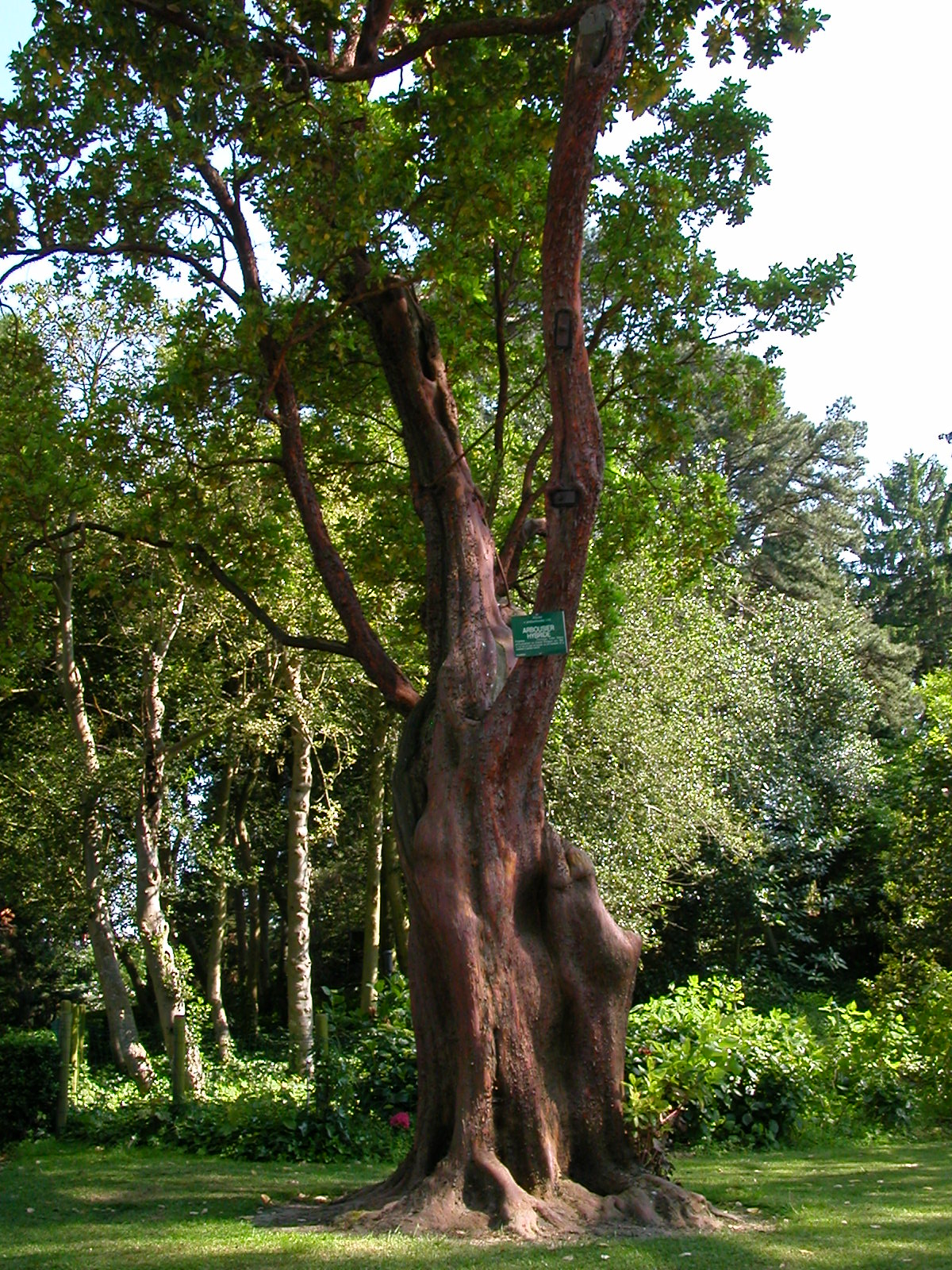
- An unusually large specimen at Jardin des plantes de Nantes

Scientific classification
- Kingdom: Plantae
- Clade: Tracheophytes
- Clade: Angiosperms
- Clade: Eudicots
- Clade: Asterids
- Order: Ericales
- Family: Ericaceae
- Genus: Arbutus
- Species: A. × andrachnoides

Binomial name
- Arbutus × andrachnoides Link

Synonyms
- Arbutus × hybrida Ker Gawl.

= Arbutus × andrachnoides =

Hybrid of flowering plants in the heather family

Arbutus × andrachnoides, the hybrid strawberry-tree, is the result of a cross between Arbutus andrachne (eastern strawberry-tree) and Arbutus unedo (Irish strawberry tree). It is a naturally occurring hybrid, but hybrid cultivars have also been created. It has gained the RHS's Award of Garden Merit.

Young specimens of A. × andrachnoides possess the dark bark of A. unedo, but older trees have exfoliations revealing an orangish bark.

The first parental species, A. andrachne, also hybridized with A. canariensis to yield another hybrid, Arbutus × thuretiana Demoly, nothosp. nov..

== Description ==
It is impossible to distinguish Arbutus × andrachnoides individuals from the parent species using traditional botanical methods since they display a complete spectrum of parental traits. DNA testing and statistical methods centered on characterizing the intermediacy of the individual must be used instead.

== Gallery ==
Different parts of Arbutus × andrachnoides

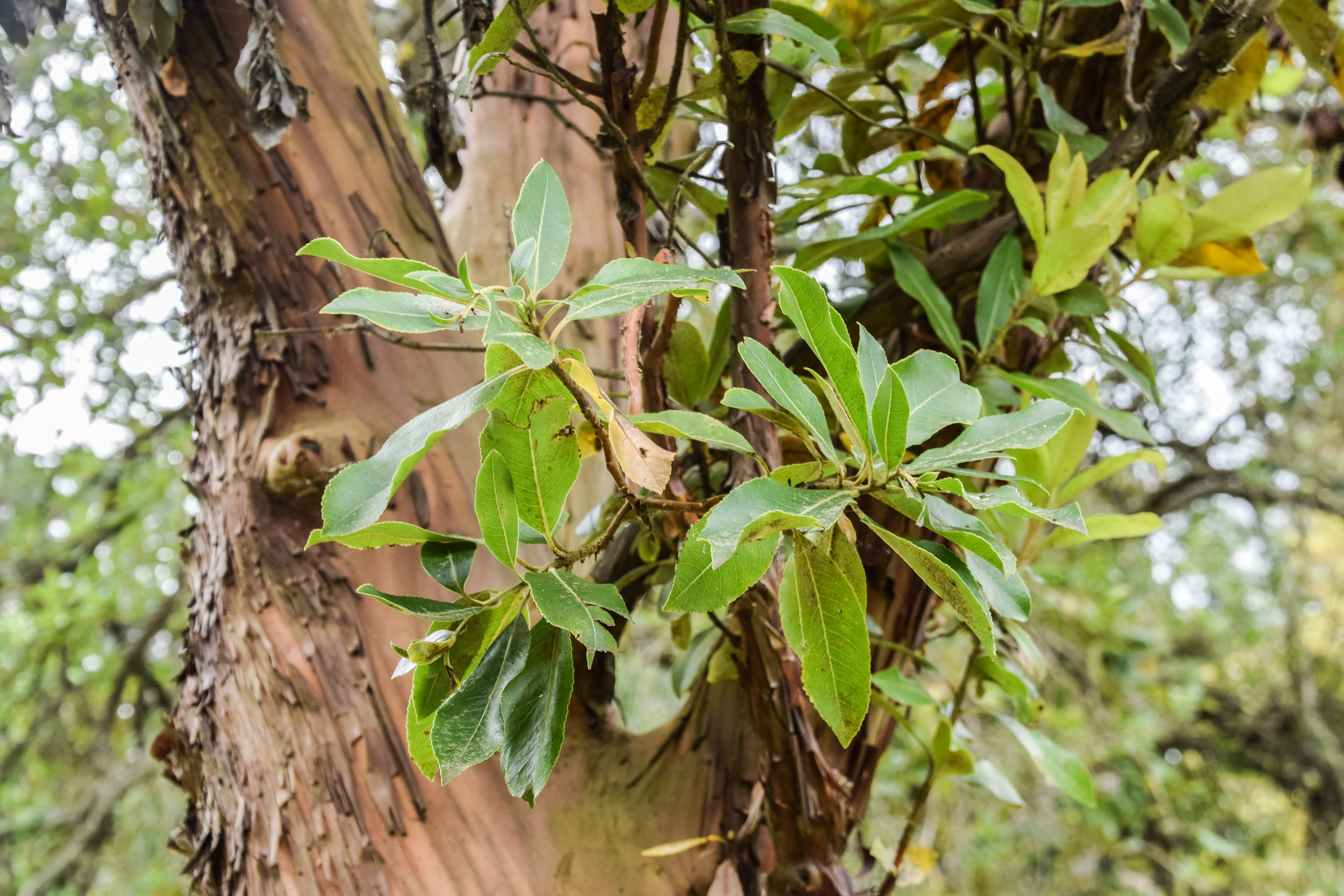
Leaves

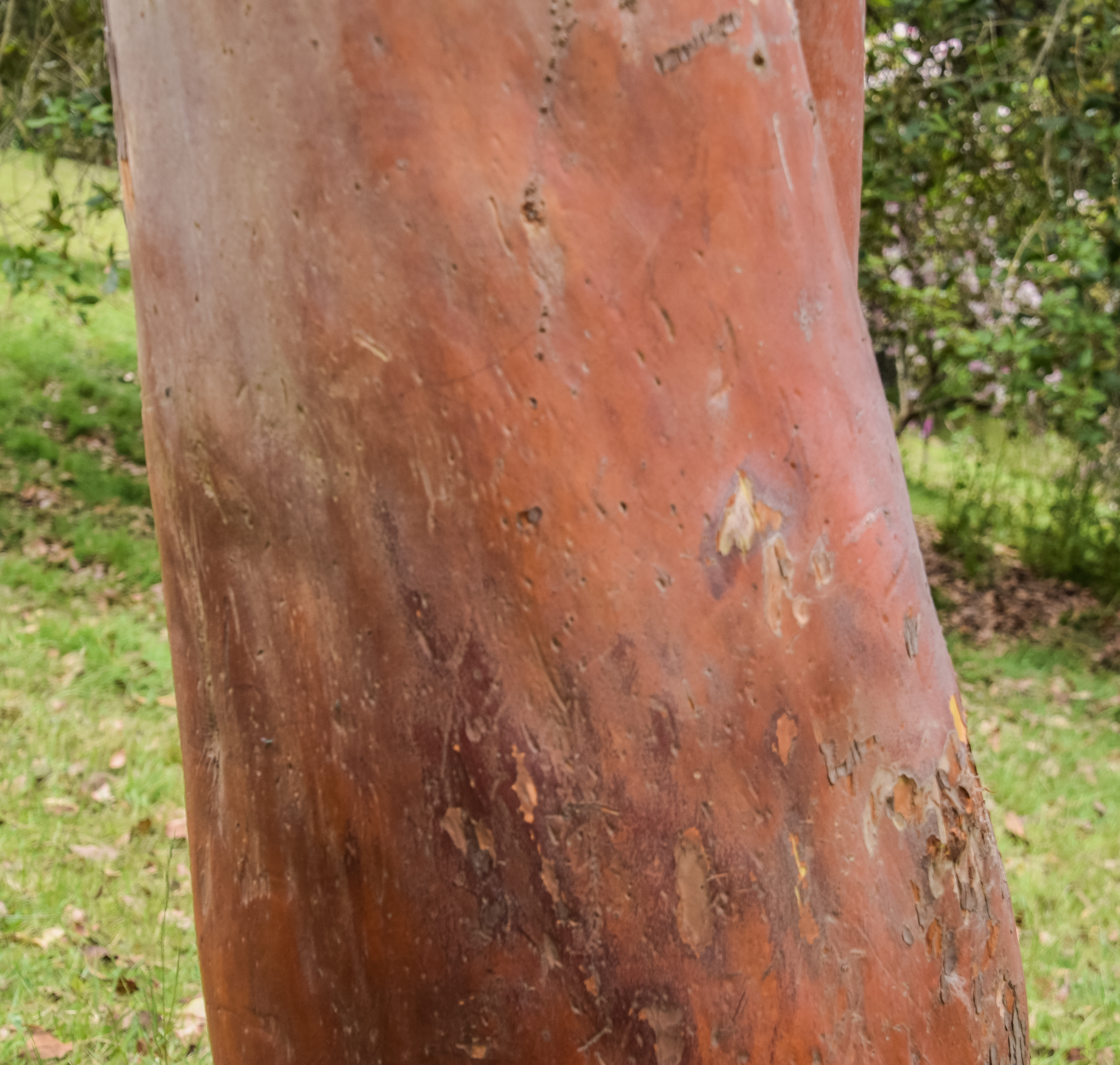
Bark
