= Thuret =

Thuret can refer to a few different people or places:

- Gustave Thuret (1817–1875), a French botanist
- Jardin botanique de la Villa Thuret, a botanic garden founded by Gustave Thuret
- Thuret, Puy-de-Dôme, a French commune
- Thuret family of clockmakers including:
  - Isaac II Thuret (1630–1706), parent
  - Jacques III Thuret (1669–1738), child
