= Arbutus unedo =

- Arbutus unedo at Carcassonne, France

Conservation status
- Least Concern (IUCN 3.1)

Scientific classification
- Kingdom: Plantae
- Clade: Tracheophytes
- Clade: Angiosperms
- Clade: Eudicots
- Clade: Asterids
- Order: Ericales
- Family: Ericaceae
- Genus: Arbutus
- Species: A. unedo

Binomial name
- Arbutus unedo L. 1753
- Distribution map. ✖ Native range. ▲ Introduced and naturalised (synanthropic).

Synonyms
- Synonymy: Unedo edulis Hoffmanns.; Arbutus vulgaris Bubani; Arbutus cassinifolia Steud.; Arbutus crispa Hoffmanns.; Arbutus croomii auct.; Arbutus integrifolia Sims; Arbutus intermedia Heldr. ex Nyman; Arbutus laurifolia L.f.; Arbutus microphylla auct.; Arbutus nothocomaros Heldr. ex Nyman; Arbutus procumbens Kluk ex Besser; Arbutus salicifolia (Lodd.) Cels ex Hoffmanns.; Arbutus serratifolia Salisb.; Arbutus turbinata Pers. ex Rchb.

Species of flowering plant in the heather family

Arbutus unedo, commonly known as strawberry-tree, or strawberry tree, also called madroño in Spanish, is an evergreen shrub or small tree in the family Ericaceae, native to the Mediterranean Basin and Western Europe. The tree is well known for its fruit, the arbutus berry, which bears some resemblance to the strawberry, hence the common name strawberry-tree. However, it is not closely related to true strawberries of the genus Fragaria.

Its presence in Ireland also lends it the name Irish strawberry-tree, or cain, or cane apple, from the Irish name for the tree, caithne, or sometimes Killarney strawberry-tree. The strawberry-tree is the national tree of Italy because of its green leaves, its white flowers and its red berries, colours that recall the Italian flag. The flower is the national flower of Italy.

== Taxonomy ==
Arbutus unedo was one of the many species described by Carl Linnaeus in Volume One of his landmark 1753 work Species Plantarum, giving it the name it still bears today.

It is monotypic, with no subspecies or varieties accepted. A red-flowered variant was named A. unedo var. rubra by William Aiton in 1785; it is not now considered botanically distinct.

A study published in 2001 which analysed ribosomal DNA from Arbutus and related genera found Arbutus to be paraphyletic, and A. unedo to be closely related to the other Mediterranean Basin species such as A. andrachne and A. canariensis, but not to the American members of the genus.

Arbutus unedo and A. andrachne hybridise naturally where their ranges overlap; the hybrid has been named Arbutus × andrachnoides (syn. A. × hybrida, or A. andrachne × A. unedo), inheriting traits of both parent species, although fruit are not usually borne freely, and as a hybrid is unlikely to breed true from seed.

== Description ==
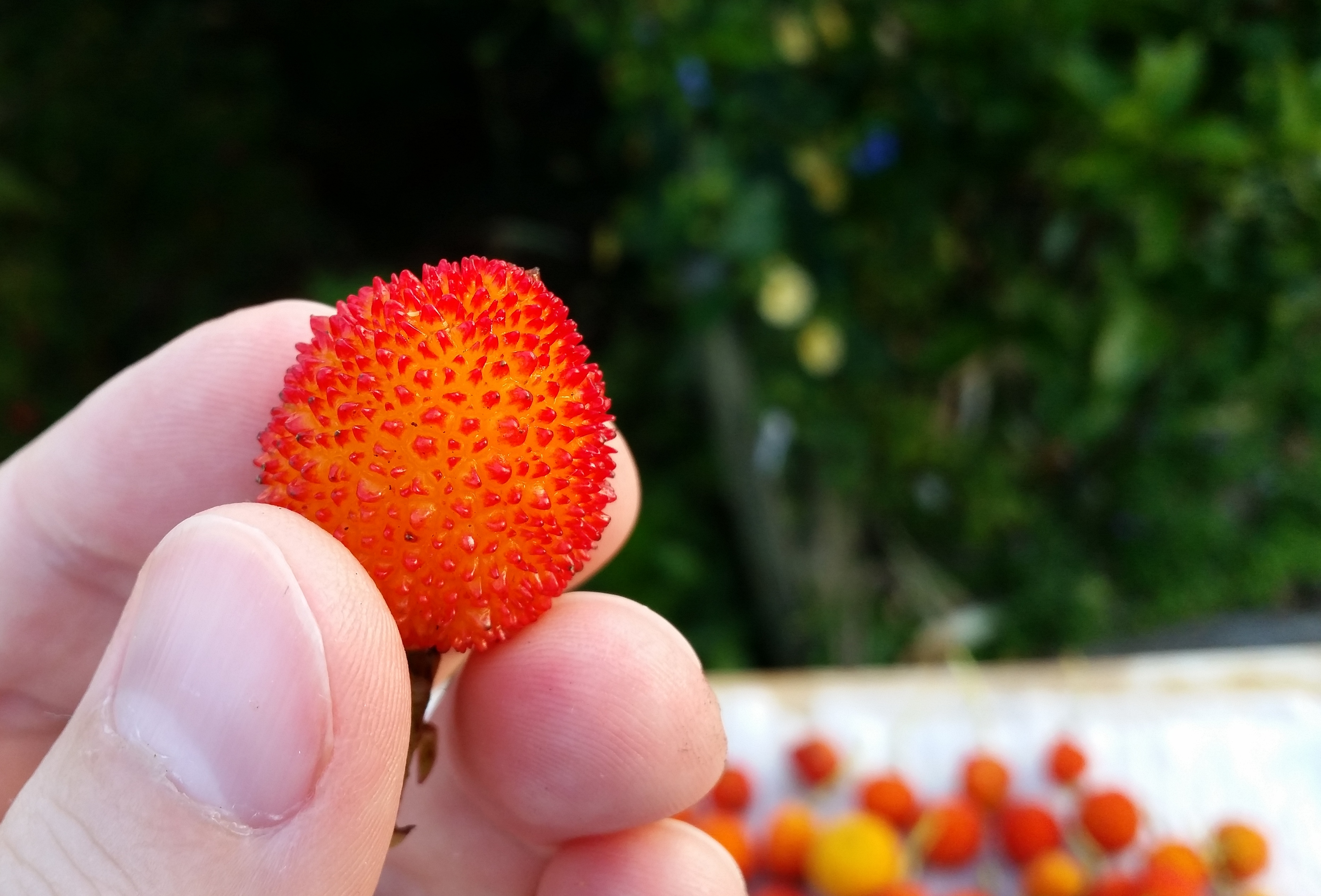

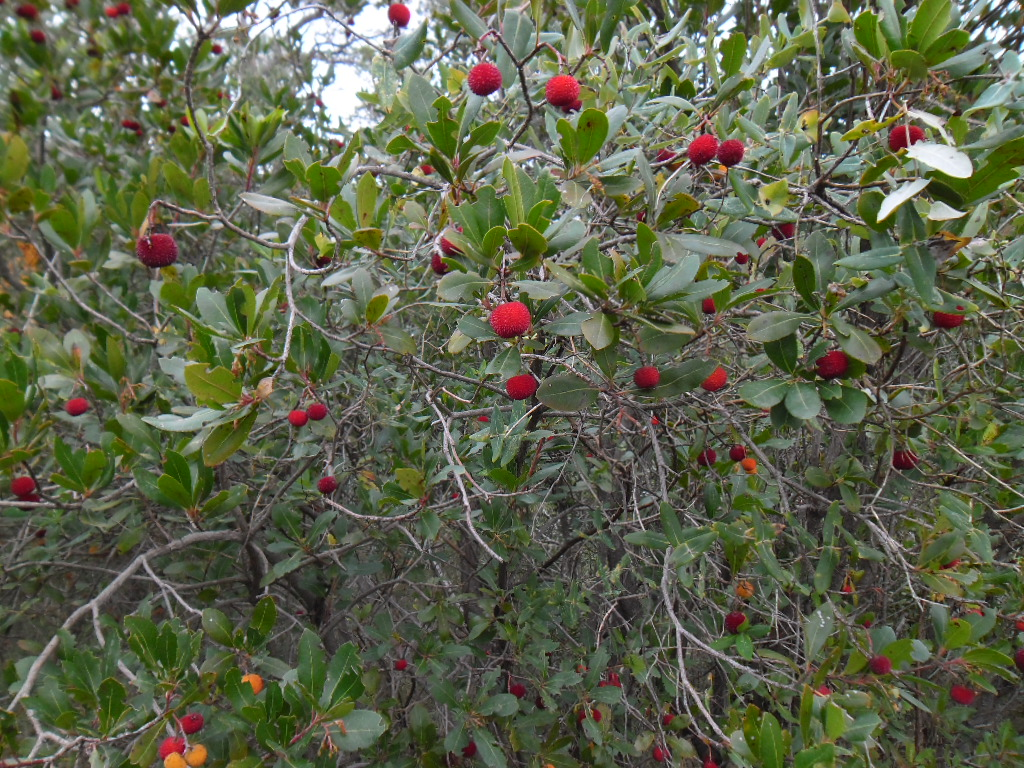

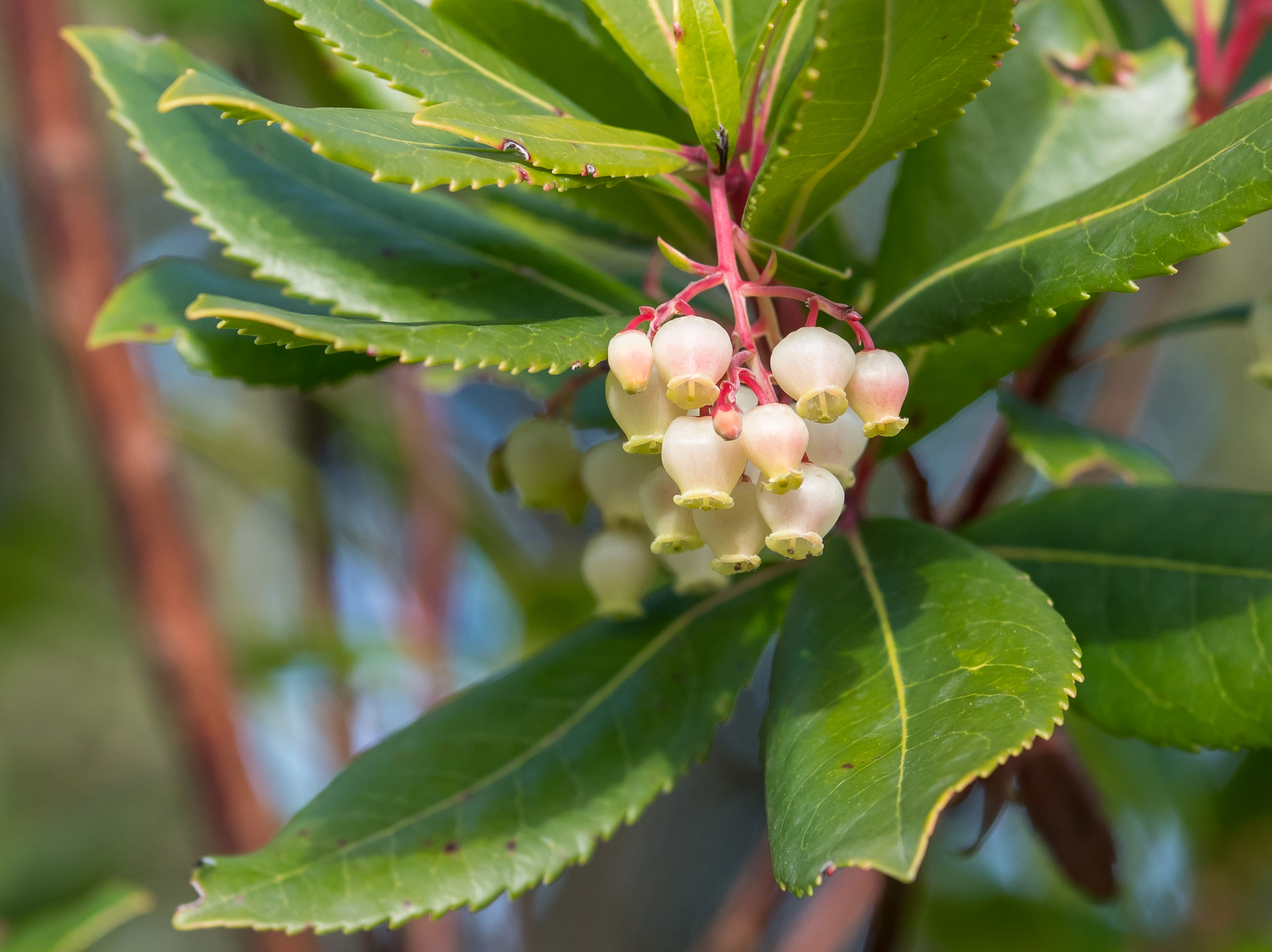

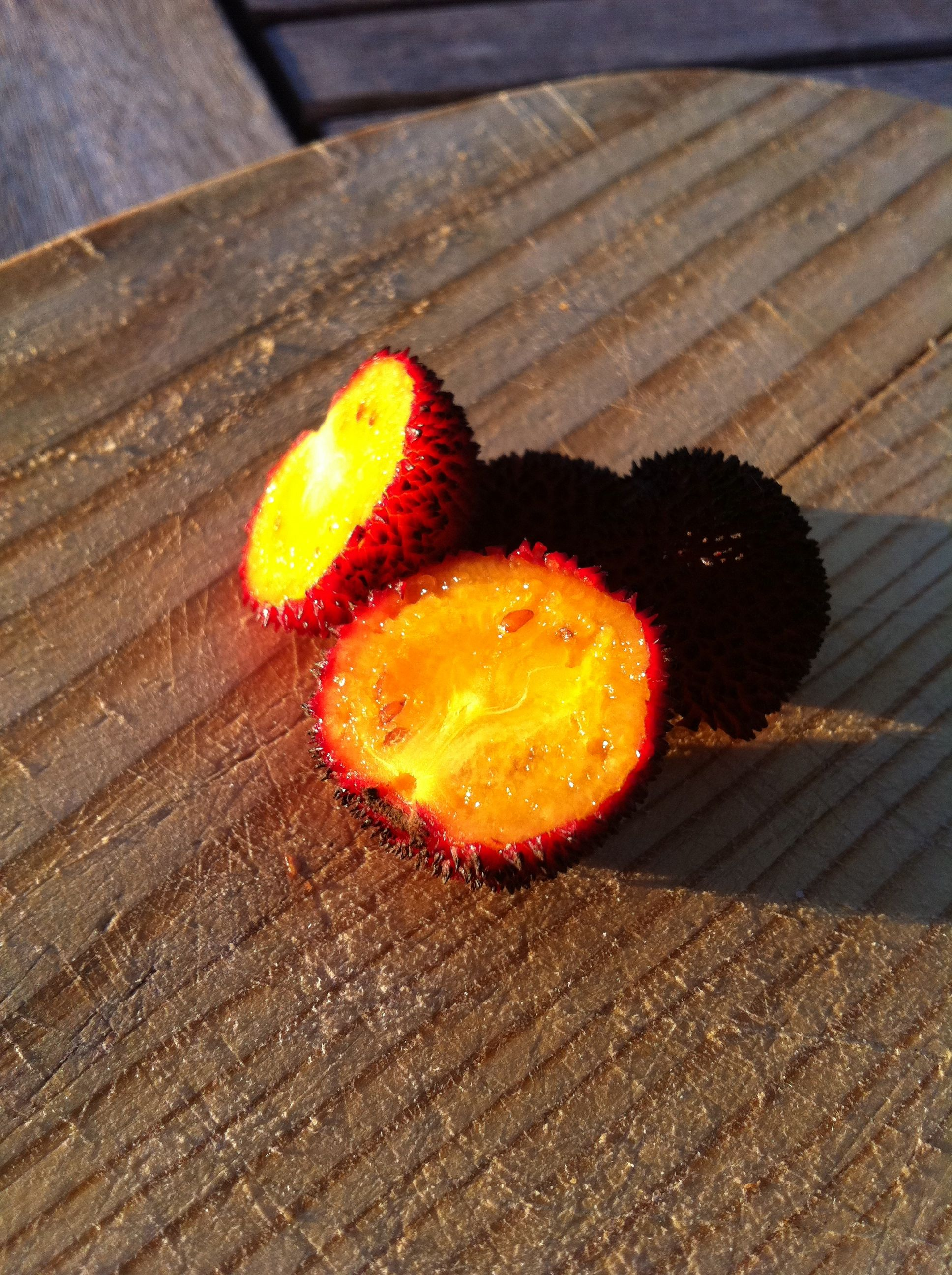

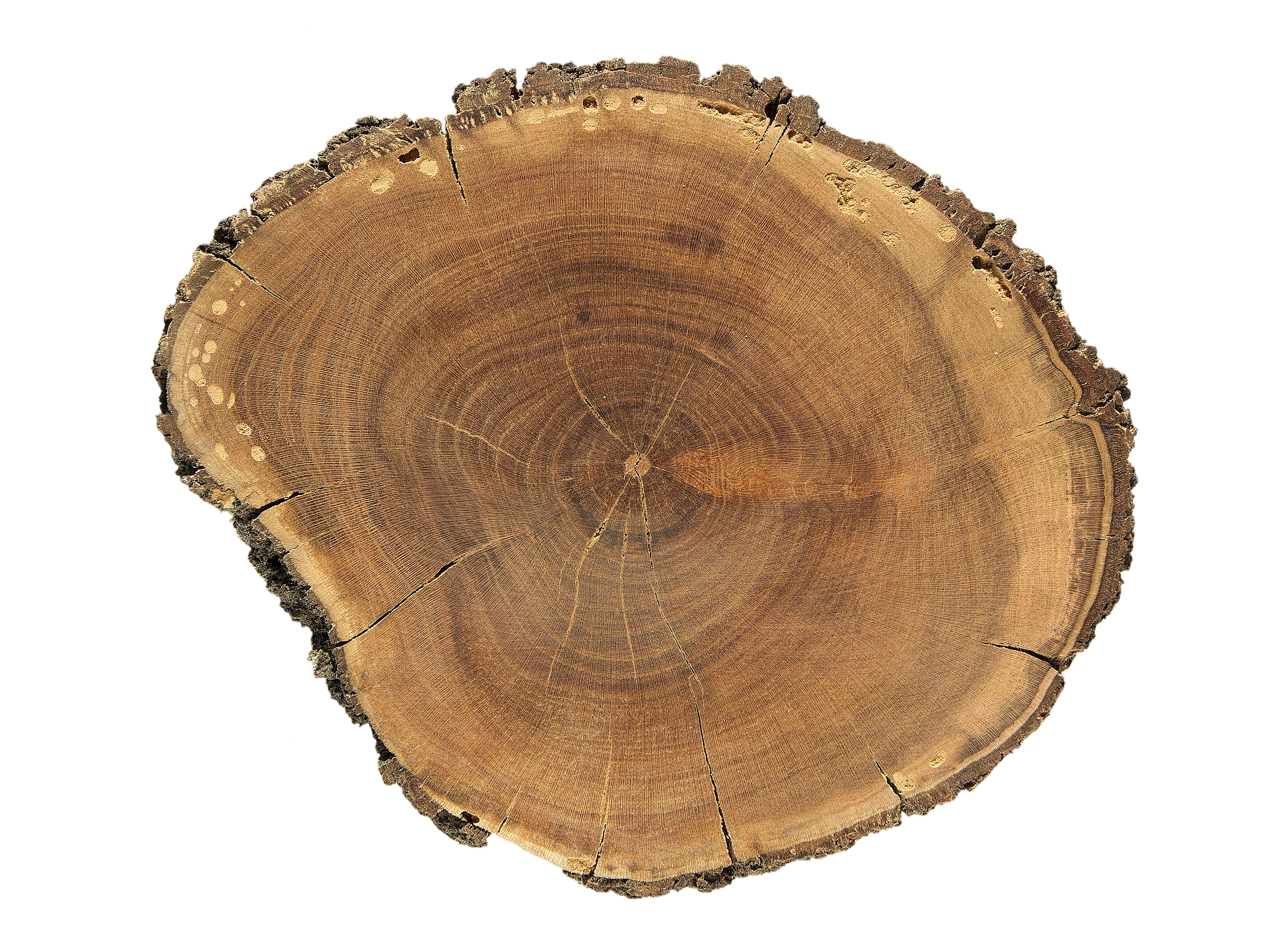

Arbutus unedo grows to 4–7 m (13–23 ft) tall, rarely up to 13 m (45 ft), with a trunk diameter of up to 120 cm (47 in). It grows in hardiness zones 7–10.

The twigs are reddish-brown and abundantly leafy, and often have small hairs. The leaves are green and glossy on the upper side, dull on the underside, 5–10 cm (2–4 in) long and 1.5–4 cm (1–2 in) broad, laurel-like and usually with a serrated or serrulated margin, rarely entire.

The flowers are hermaphrodite, white, or rarely pale pink to reddish, bell-shaped, 6–8 mm (0.24–0.31 in) diameter, produced in clusters of 15–20 on a reddish hanging panicle in autumn. They have a sweet honey-like scent with plentiful nectar, and are pollinated by bees.

The fruit is a red berry, 15–20 mm (0.59–0.79 in) diameter, spherical, with a rough surface. It matures in about 12 months, in autumn, at the same time as the next flowering. It is edible when fully ripe, but tasteless. The seeds are small, brown and angular and are dispersed by frugivorous birds.

The name unedo is attributed to Pliny the Elder, who allegedly claimed that "unum tantum edo", meaning "I eat only one". This refers to the bland, insipid flavour of the fruit and its gritty texture from the numerous small, hard seeds.

== Distribution ==
Arbutus unedo is widespread in the Mediterranean region, in Portugal, Spain, western and southeastern France; southward in Algeria, Morocco, Libya, and Tunisia, and eastward in Albania, Bulgaria, Croatia, Greece, Italy, Malta, Montenegro, Slovenia, Turkey, Israel, Palestine, Jordan, Lebanon, and Syria. It is naturalised in Great Britain and Ireland, being particularly common in western Ireland, where it is an archaeophyte that was formerly believed to be native.

A. unedo has been noted for its disjunct distribution, with isolated relict populations in southern and western Ireland in addition to its Mediterranean range. It was commonly cited as an example of the Lusitanian flora, a small assemblage of plants native to Iberia and southwestern Ireland, but generally absent from Britain. Recent genetic studies have however suggested that A. unedo may not be truly native in Ireland, but a Chalcolithic period introduction.

== Cultivation ==
Arbutus unedo is quite an easy plant to cultivate, and is adaptable to many climates. Once established it is fairly drought resistant, frost resistant, shade tolerant and salt tolerant.

Lower production of fruit mass has however been reported in case of summer droughts, and frosts in flowering time were seen to decrease the amount of fruit.

Arbutus unedo is naturally adapted to Mediterranean dry summer climates, but grows well in the cool, wet summers of western Ireland and England, and temperate regions of Europe and Asia. It has become a very popular ornamental plant in California and the rest of the west coast of North America. It can grow easily in USDA hardiness zone 7 or warmer. Pests include scales and thrips, and diseases include anthracnose, Phytophthora, root rot, and rust.

Unlike most of the Ericaceae, A. unedo grows well in basic (limy) high pH soils, even though it does better in more acidic soils.

The fruit production is not very high and is highly variable on the weather, and that may be part of the reason this plant is not frequently cultivated. The average yield in a two years study is around 46 kg per hectare, and 180 grams per cubic metre of crown. However, very little work has so far been done in terms of genotype selection.

Arbutus unedo forms mycorrhizal relationships. Inoculation with Pisolithus tinctorius has shown to greatly improve the plant's root mass, size, and tolerance of drought and nutritional stress.

In cultivation in the UK, the form A. unedo f. rubra and the cultivar 'Atlantic' have gained the Royal Horticultural Society's Award of Garden Merit.

=== Propagation ===
Propagation can be done by seed, layering, or cutting.

The seed benefits from a one-month cold stratification period, then soaked for 5 to 6 days in warm water to improve germination success. Seedlings are prone to damp, and benefit from care in the first year.

Germination rate is low, rarely over 20%.

Layering can take up to two years, but has a good success rate, while cutting is done with a 15–20 cm (6–8 in) long mature wood, preferably with a heel in November to December. The success rate however is not very high.

== Uses ==
=== Culinary uses ===
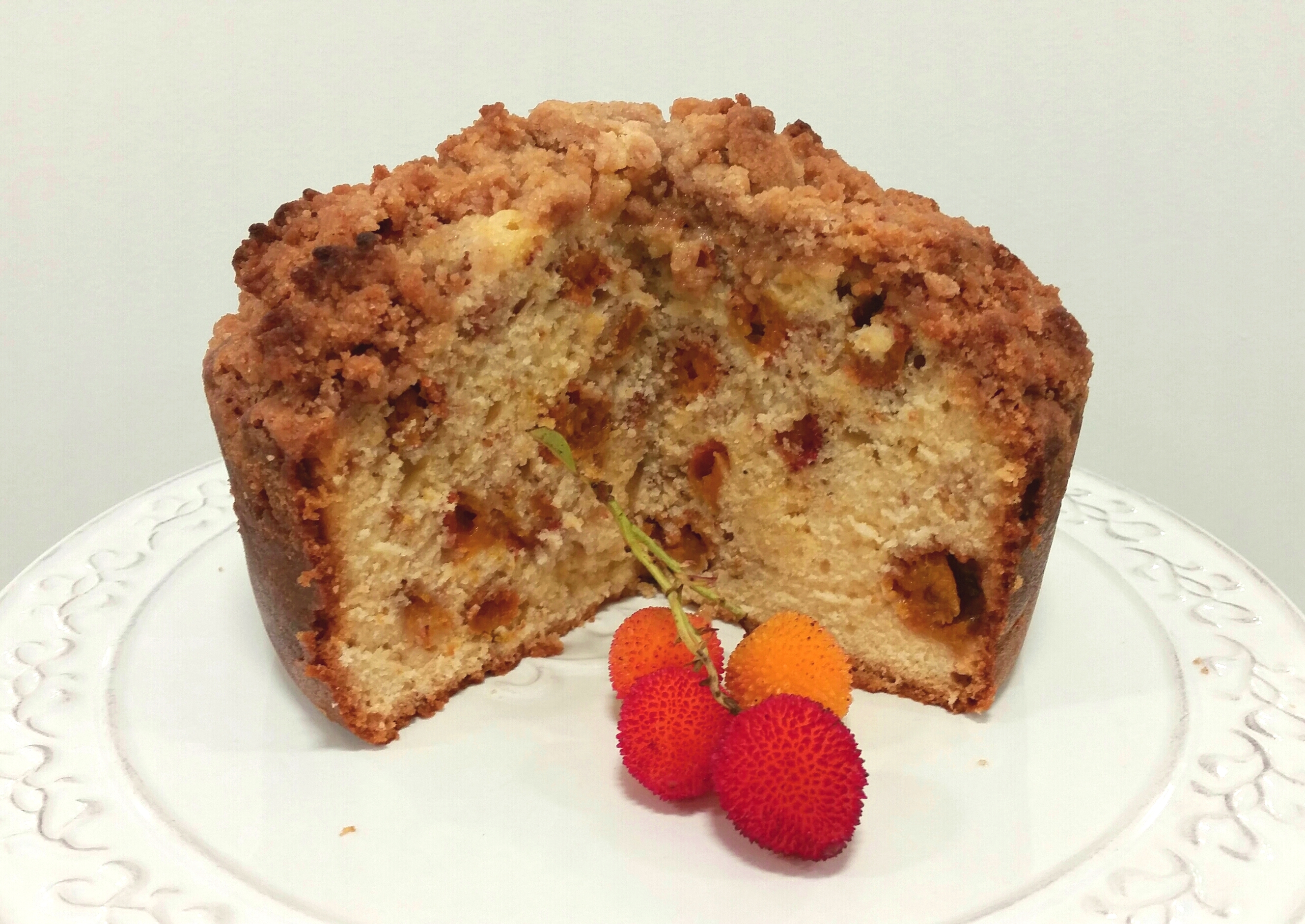
Crumble cake

Arbutus berries have a high content of sugars (40%), and antioxidant vitamins such as vitamin C, beta-carotene, niacin, tocopherols, and organic acids that are precursors to omega-3 and omega-6 fatty acids (nearly 9%). They are edible fresh, but seldom consumed in that state - not least because the mature fruit tends to bruise very easily, making transportation difficult.

They are used mostly for jam, marmalades, yogurt and alcoholic beverages, such as the Portuguese medronho, a type of strong brandy. Many regions of Albania prepare the traditional drink rakia from the fruit (mare or kocimare in Albanian), whence comes the name of the drink, which is raki kocimarje.

The flowers are pollinated by bees, and the resulting honey is bitter tasting but still considered a delicacy.

=== Herbal medicine ===
Arbutus unedo leaves have been employed in traditional and folk medicine in the form of a decoction said to have the following properties: astringent, diuretic, urinary anti-septic, antiseptic, intoxicant, rheumatism, tonic, and more recently, in the therapy of hypertension and diabetes.

The leaves are reported to have a high concentration of flavonol antioxidants, especially quercetin, best extracted with a decoction, and together with the fruit are a source of antioxidants.

The nectar contains the isoprenoid unedone (2-(1,2-dihydroxypropyl)-4,4,8-trimethyl-1-oxaspiro[2.5]oct-7-en-6-one) which is biologically active against a common and debilitating parasite of bumble bees, Crithidia bombi, so could provide a naturally occurring way for bees to withstand the burden of disease which has been reported to be a contributing factor in pollinator declines. The compound is glycosylated to an inactive form unedone-8-O-glycoside once consumed by the bee (perhaps to reduce any toxic effects against the bee) then transformed back to the active aglycone by the bee's microbiome in the hindgut where the parasite is most prevalent and damaging - suggesting that the microbiome assists in the anti-parasitic process.

=== Ecological design ===
In landscape design, ecosystem restoration or permaculture based designs, A. unedo can have many purposes. While the ornamental one is the most common, this can be a valuable plant also for restoring degraded ecosystems and preventing desertification. Being a pioneer plant and growing well also in poor soils, it can be used in a wide array of situations.

- The flowers are a significant source of nectar and pollen for bees, while the fruit is food for birds.
- Its salt tolerance, coupled with it being an evergreen, make it a good choice for wind barriers in lands close to the sea.
- A. unedo is fire resistant, able to regrow after a fire, and being a pioneer plant can contribute to the discontinuity of fire-prone pines and eucalyptus monocultures; for the same reasons it is a good candidate for reforestation in Mediterranean areas.
- The dense foliage throughout the year can be a shelter for insects and small animals during the winter.
- Its extensive root system can help in the soil stabilisation process.

=== Other uses ===
- The wood is quite hard and well suited for a various uses such as firewood and to make pipes. Since it does not usually grow straight, it is not suitable for construction or similar uses.
- The tree is also grown as an ornamental plant, because of its nice-looking and -smelling flowers and fruit and their interesting presence on the plant at the same time, and because it is an evergreen. It is used as a single or multi-trunked ornamental tree, and as a specimen or hedge shrub in gardens and public landscapes.

== History ==
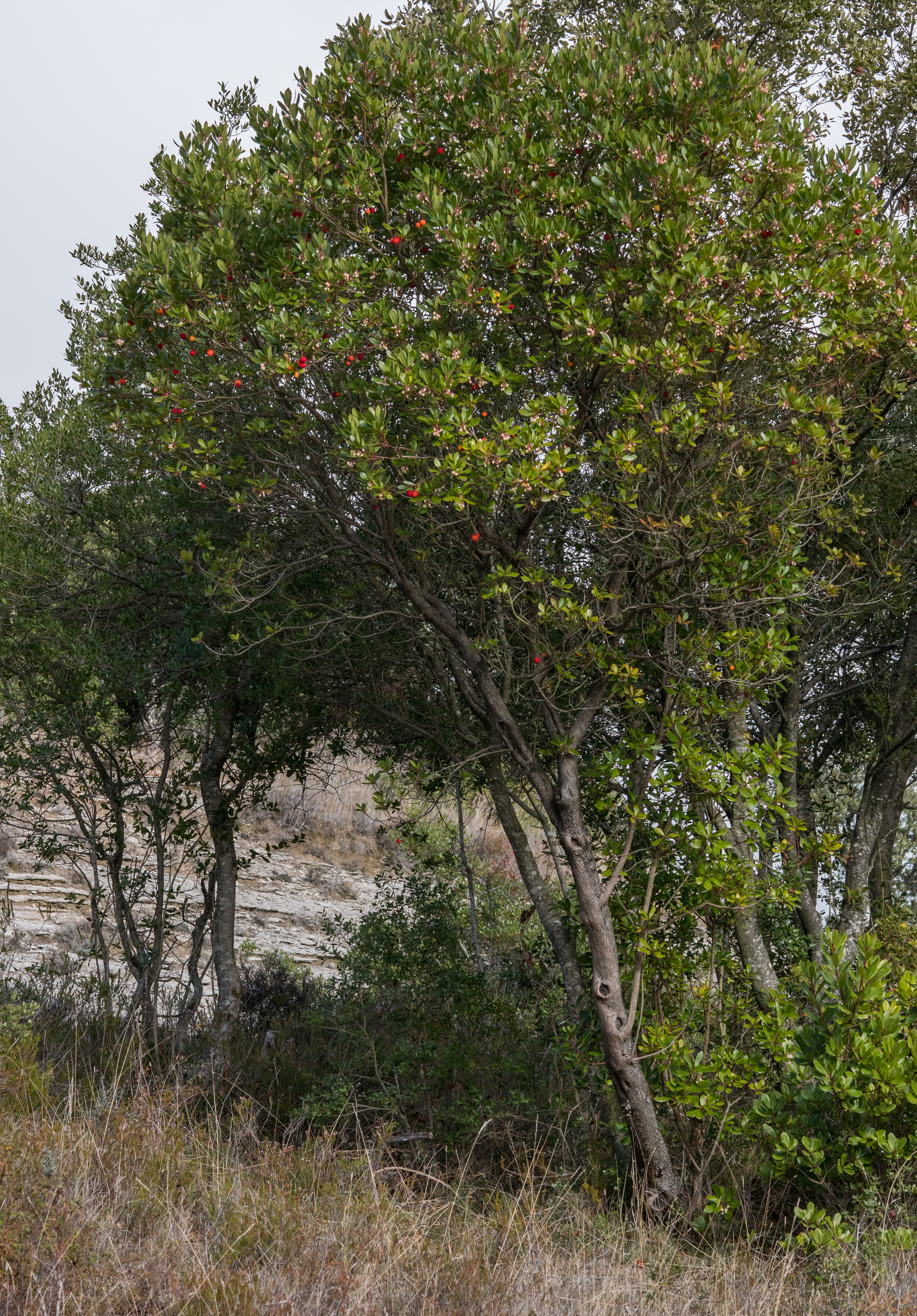
Wild specimens in fruit, Spain

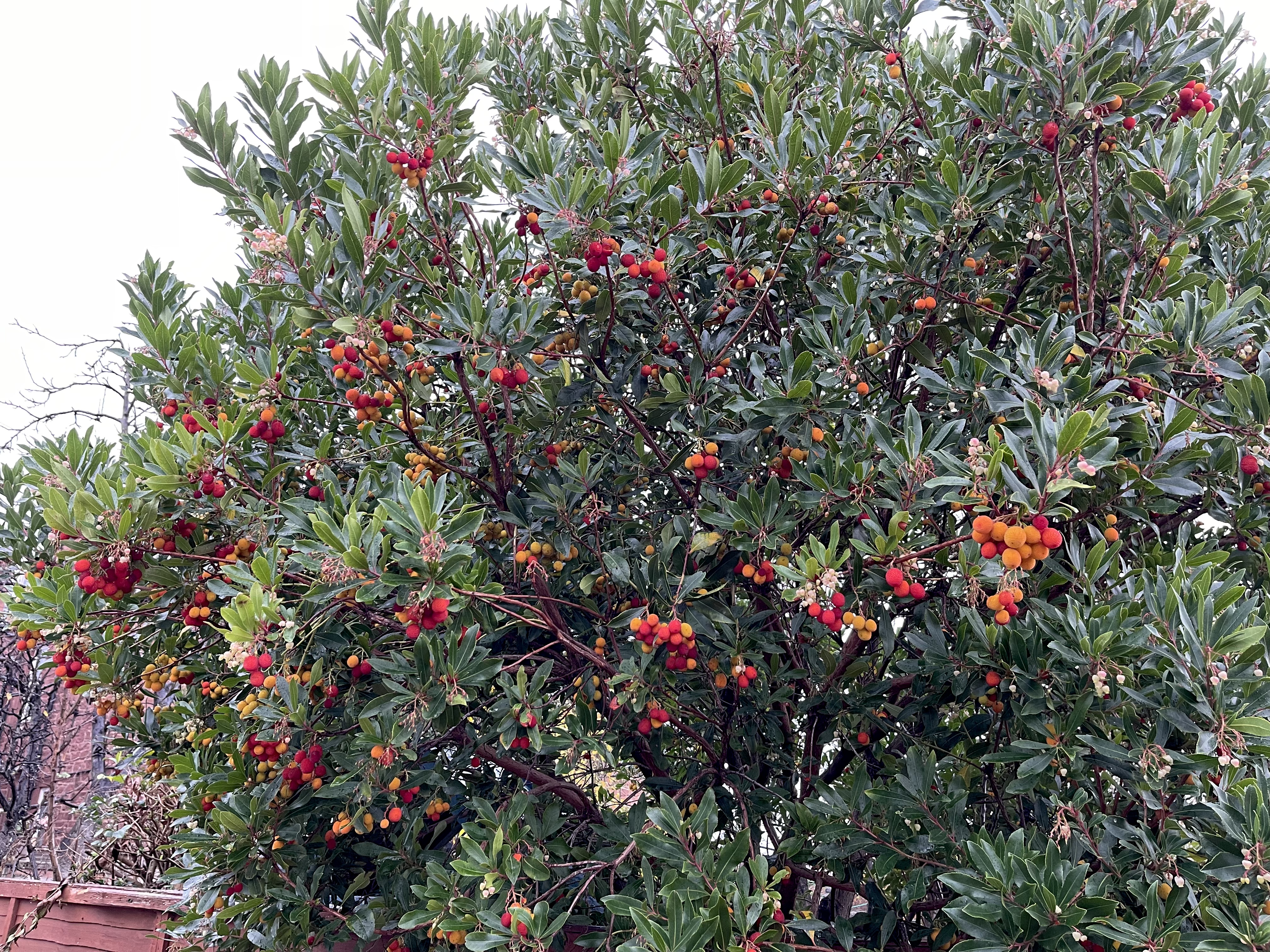
Cultivated specimen fruiting profusely in a Scottish garden

Its Mediterranean habitat, elegant details of leaf and habit and dramatic show of fruit with flowers made Arbutus unedo notable in Classical Antiquity, when it was called Andrachne, and for which Theophrastos (4th c. BCE) wrote about it, as well as the ancient army medical herbalist Pedanios Dioscorides [De Materia Medica, Book II-150]; in addition, Pliny thought it should not be planted where bees are kept, for the bitterness it imparts to honey.

The first evidence of its importation into northern European gardens was to 16th-century England from Ireland. In 1586 a correspondent in Ireland sent plants to the Elizabethan courtiers Lord Leicester and Sir Francis Walsingham. An earlier description by Rev. William Turner (The Names of Herbes, 1548) was probably based on hearsay. The Irish association of Arbutus in English gardens is reflected in the inventory taken in 1649 of Henrietta Maria's Wimbledon: "one very fayre tree, called the Irish arbutis standing in the midle parte of the sayd kitchin garden, very lovely to look upon" By the 18th century Arbutus unedo was well known enough in English gardens for Batty Langley to make the bold and impractical suggestion that it might be used for hedges, though it "will not admit of being clipped as other evergreens are".

In the United States, Thomas Jefferson lists the plant in his Monticello gardens in 1778.

The form A. unedo f. rubra and the hybrid A. × andrachnoides, have gained the Royal Horticultural Society's Award of Garden Merit.

== Symbolic uses ==
=== Ancient history ===
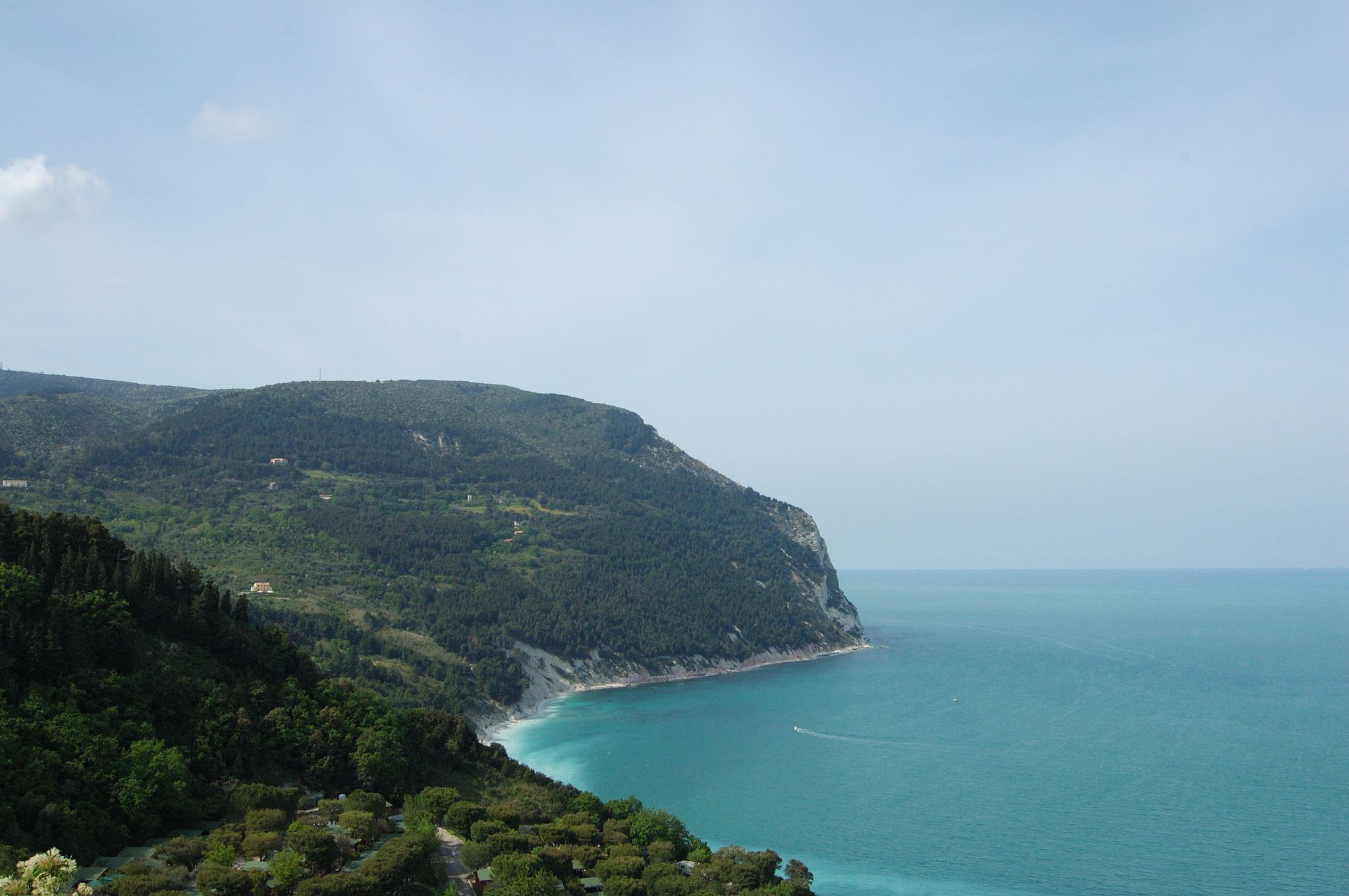
Mount Conero, Italy, whose name is derived from Greek κόμαρος (komaròs) and indicates the strawberry-tree which is common on the slopes of the mountain

The tree is mentioned by Roman poet Ovid, in Book I: 89–112 "The Golden Age" of his Metamorphoses: "Contented with food that grew without cultivation, they collected mountain strawberries and the fruit of the strawberry-tree, wild cherries, blackberries clinging to the tough brambles, and acorns fallen from Jupiter's spreading oak-tree". In his Description of Greece, Pausanias associated the tree with the god Hermes.

The name of the Italian promontory Mount Conero, situated directly south of the port of Ancona on the Adriatic Sea, derives from the Greek name κόμαρος (komaròs) indicating the strawberry-tree which is common on the slopes of the mountain. Mount Conero, the only coastal high point on the Adriatic sea between Trieste and the Gargano massif in the region of Apulia, has assisted navigators in sailing across the Adriatic sea since ancient times.

=== Italy ===
Arbutus unedo, in Italian (Italian: corbezzolo [korˈbettsolo]), began to be considered one of the national symbols of Italy in the 19th century, during the Italian unification, because its autumn colour is reminiscent of the flag of Italy (green for its leaves, white for its flowers and red for its berries).

For this reason the poet Giovanni Pascoli dedicated a poem to the plant. He refers to the Aeneid passage in which Pallas, killed by Turnus, was posed on branches of a strawberry-tree. He saw in the colours of that plant a prefiguration of the flag of Italy and considered Pallas the first national cause martyr. Pascoli's ode says:

(in Italian)

O verde albero italico, il tuo maggio
è nella bruma: s'anche tutto muora,
tu il giovanile gonfalon selvaggio
spieghi alla bora

— Giovanni Pascoli

Oh green Italian tree, your
May month
is in the mist: if everything
dies,
you, the youthful wild banner
unfold to the northern wind

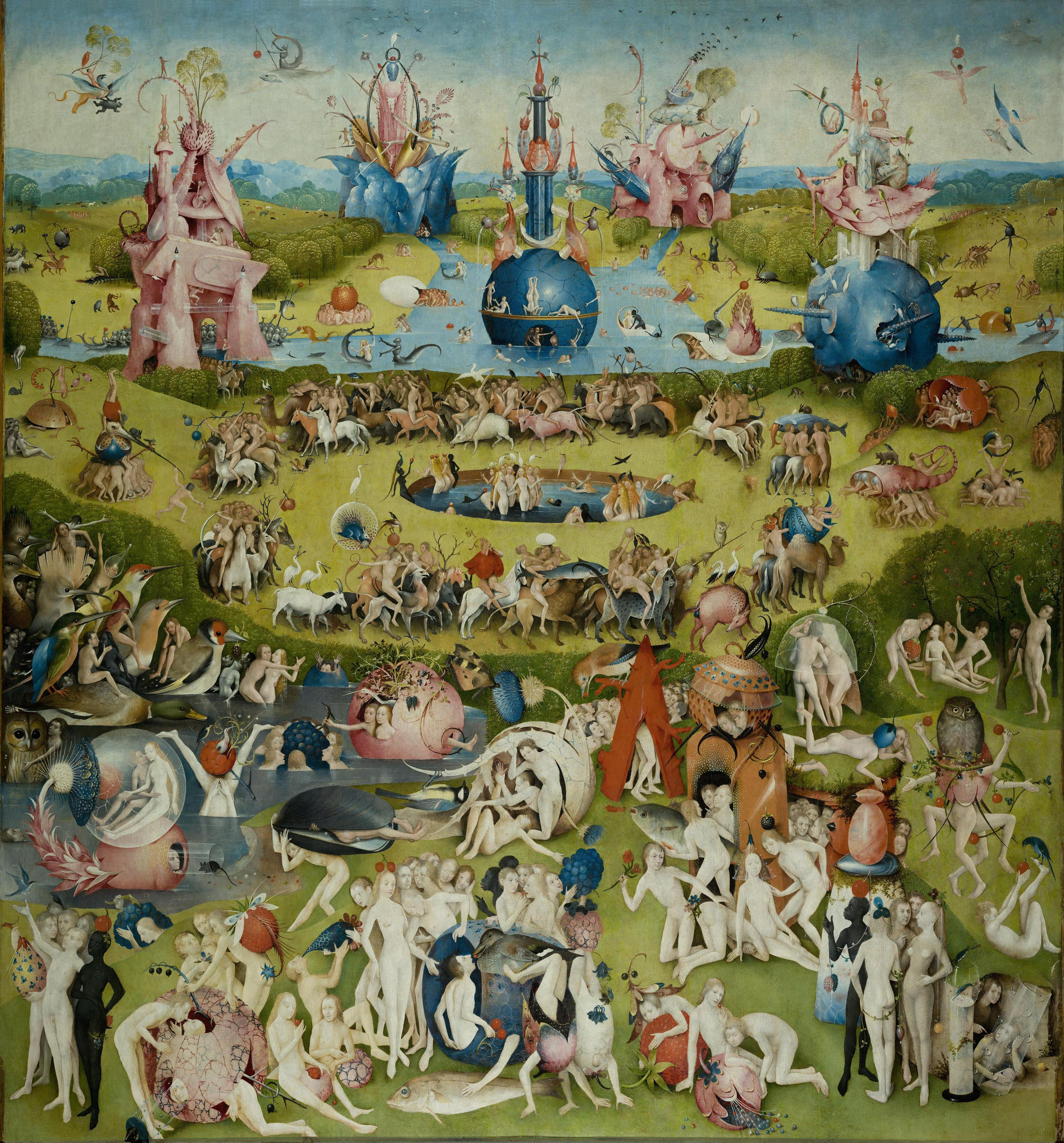
Central panel of The Garden of Earthly Delights by Hieronymus Bosch, described by José de Sigüenza as "The Picture of the Strawberry Tree"

A bear and a madroño are the symbol of Madrid.

=== Spain ===
The Garden of Earthly Delights, a painting by Hieronymus Bosch, was originally listed by José de Sigüenza, in the inventory of the Spanish Crown as La Pintura del Madroño – "The Painting of the Strawberry Tree".

The tree makes up part of the Coat of arms of Madrid (El oso y el madroño, The Bear and the Strawberry Tree) of the city of Madrid, Spain.

In the centre of the city (Puerta del Sol) there is a statue of a bear eating the fruit of the Madroño tree. The image appears on city crests, taxi cabs, man-hole covers, and other city infrastructure. The fruit of the Madroño tree ferments on the tree if left to ripen, so some of the bears become drunk from eating the fruit.

=== Ireland ===
"My love's an arbutus" is the title of a poem by the Irish writer Alfred Perceval Graves (1846–1931), set to music by his compatriot Charles Villiers Stanford (1852–1924).

== See also ==
- Arbutus unedo hybrids
