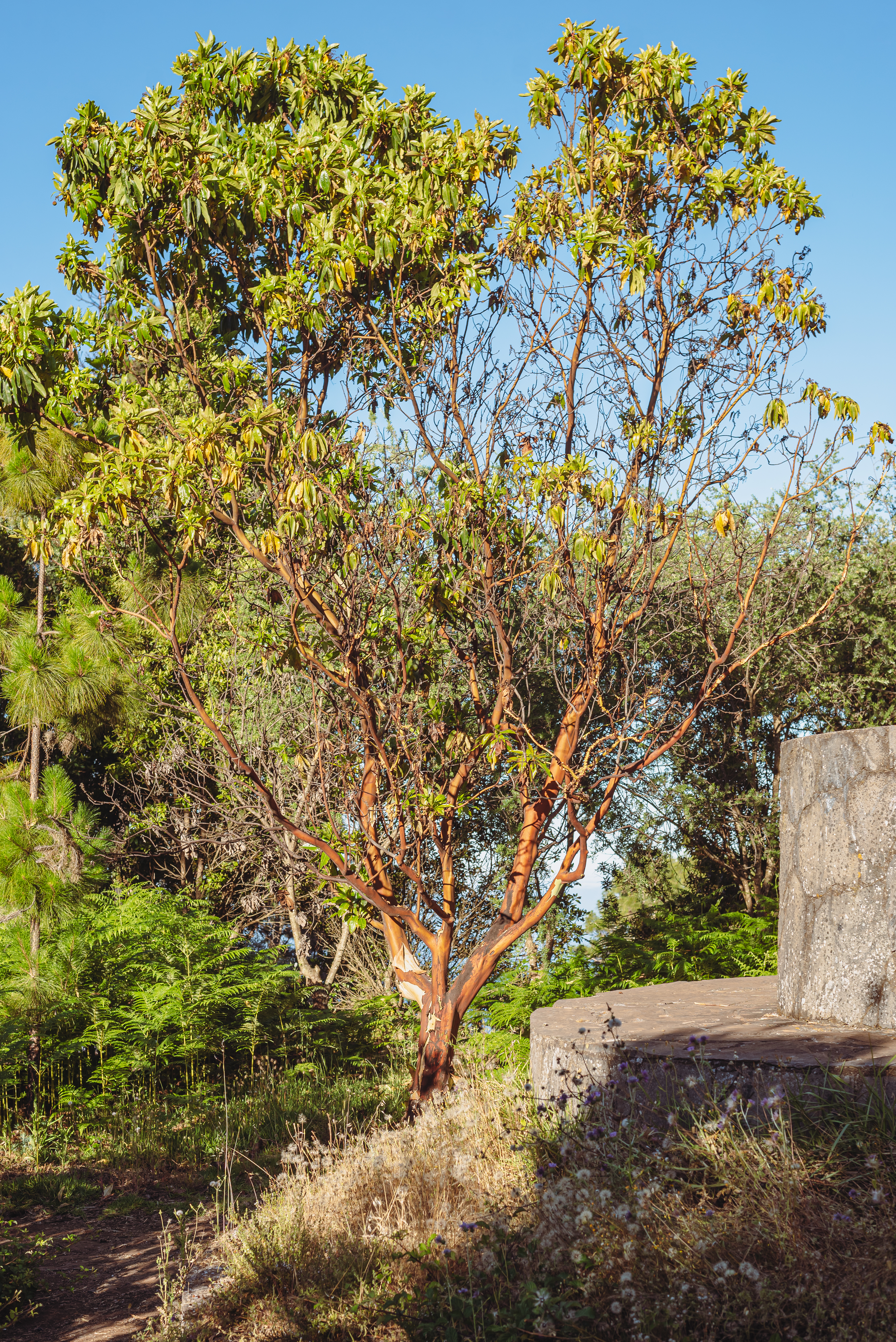

Conservation status
- Near Threatened (IUCN 3.1)

Scientific classification
- Kingdom: Plantae
- Clade: Embryophytes
- Clade: Tracheophytes
- Clade: Angiosperms
- Clade: Eudicots
- Clade: Asterids
- Order: Ericales
- Family: Ericaceae
- Genus: Arbutus
- Species: A. canariensis

Binomial name
- Arbutus canariensis Veillard ex Duhamel 1800

Synonyms
- Arbutus callicarpa Buch; Arbutus longifolia Andrews; Arbutus procera Sol. ex DC. 1839 not Douglas ex Lindl. 1836

= Arbutus canariensis =

Species of flowering plant in the heather family

Arbutus canariensis, known in Spanish as madroño canario; in English as Canary Islands strawberry tree, is a species of shrub or tree in the heath family. It is endemic to the Canary Islands of Spain, specifically Tenerife, La Gomera, Gran Canaria, El Hierro, and La Palma. It is threatened by habitat loss.

== Hybrids ==
Arbutus x thuretiana Demoly is a hybrid between A. canariensis and A. andrachne. Named after Gustave Thuret, it is naturalised at Jardin botanique de la Villa Thuret. A. x thuretiana is renowned for its perfectly smooth, reddish-brown bark, exfoliating in the spring to show a new, surprisingly pistachio-green bark, which gradually darkens and turns reddish again.

== Gallery ==
Different parts of Arbutus canariensis

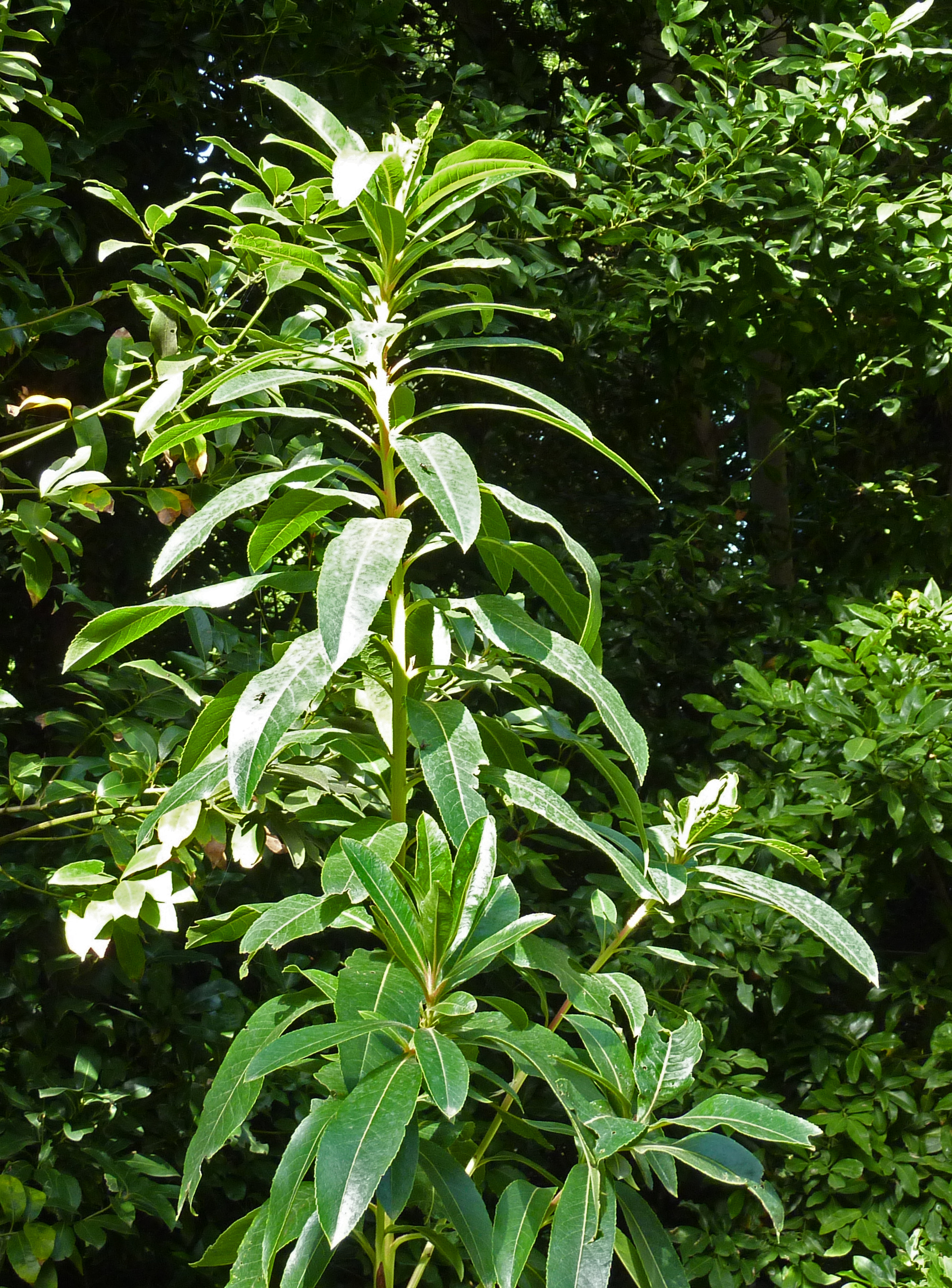
Foliage

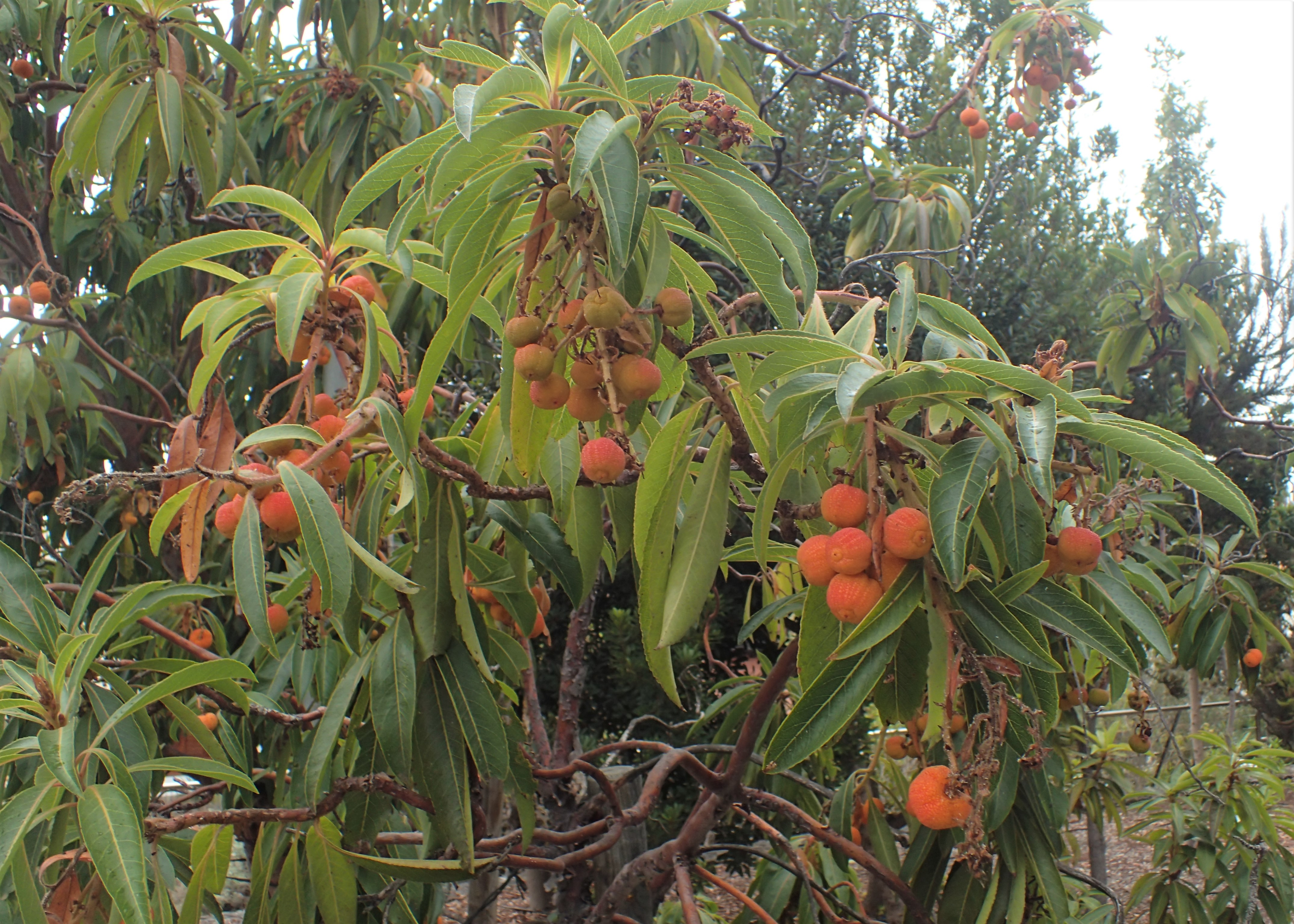
Fruits

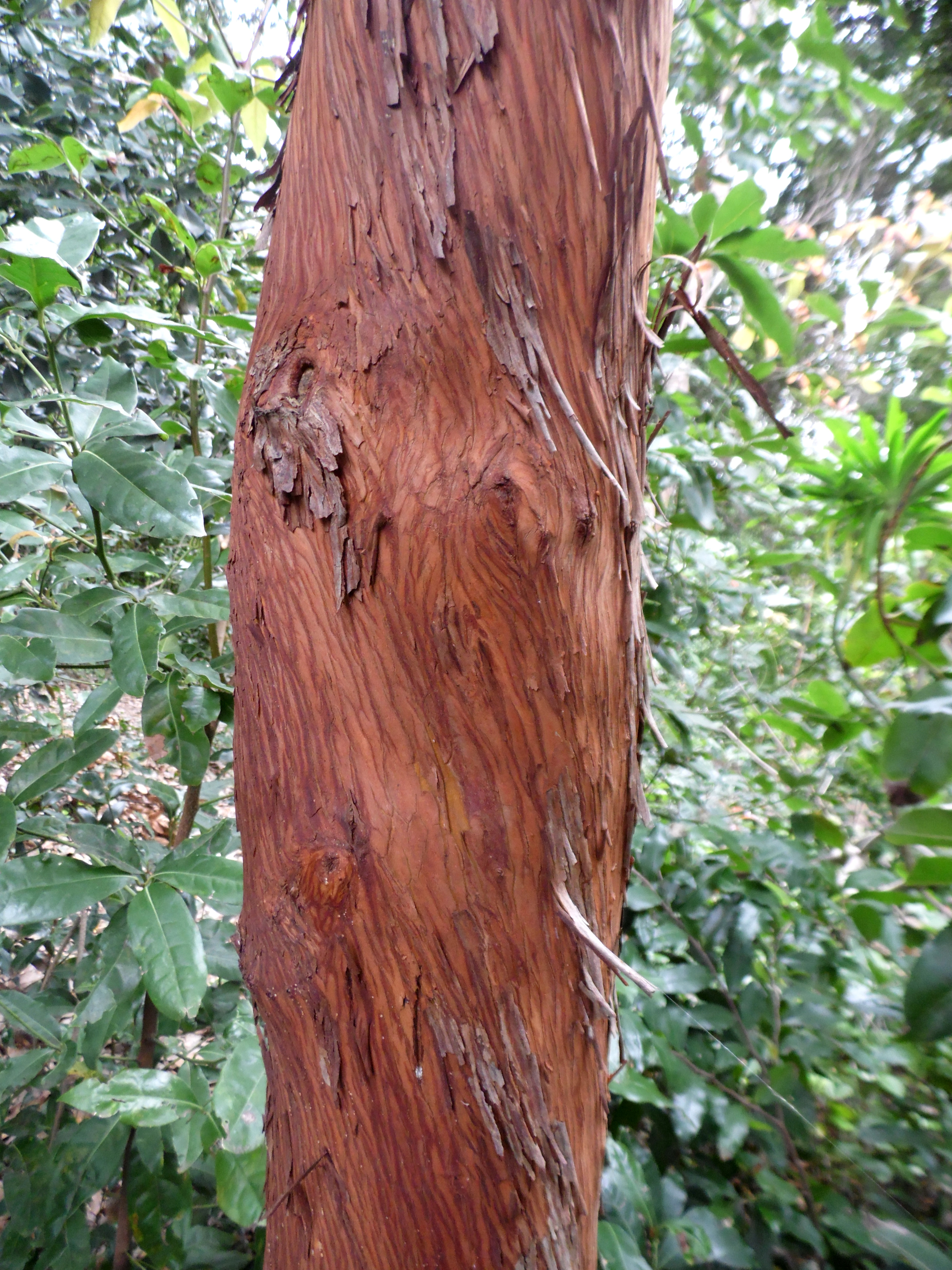
Bark

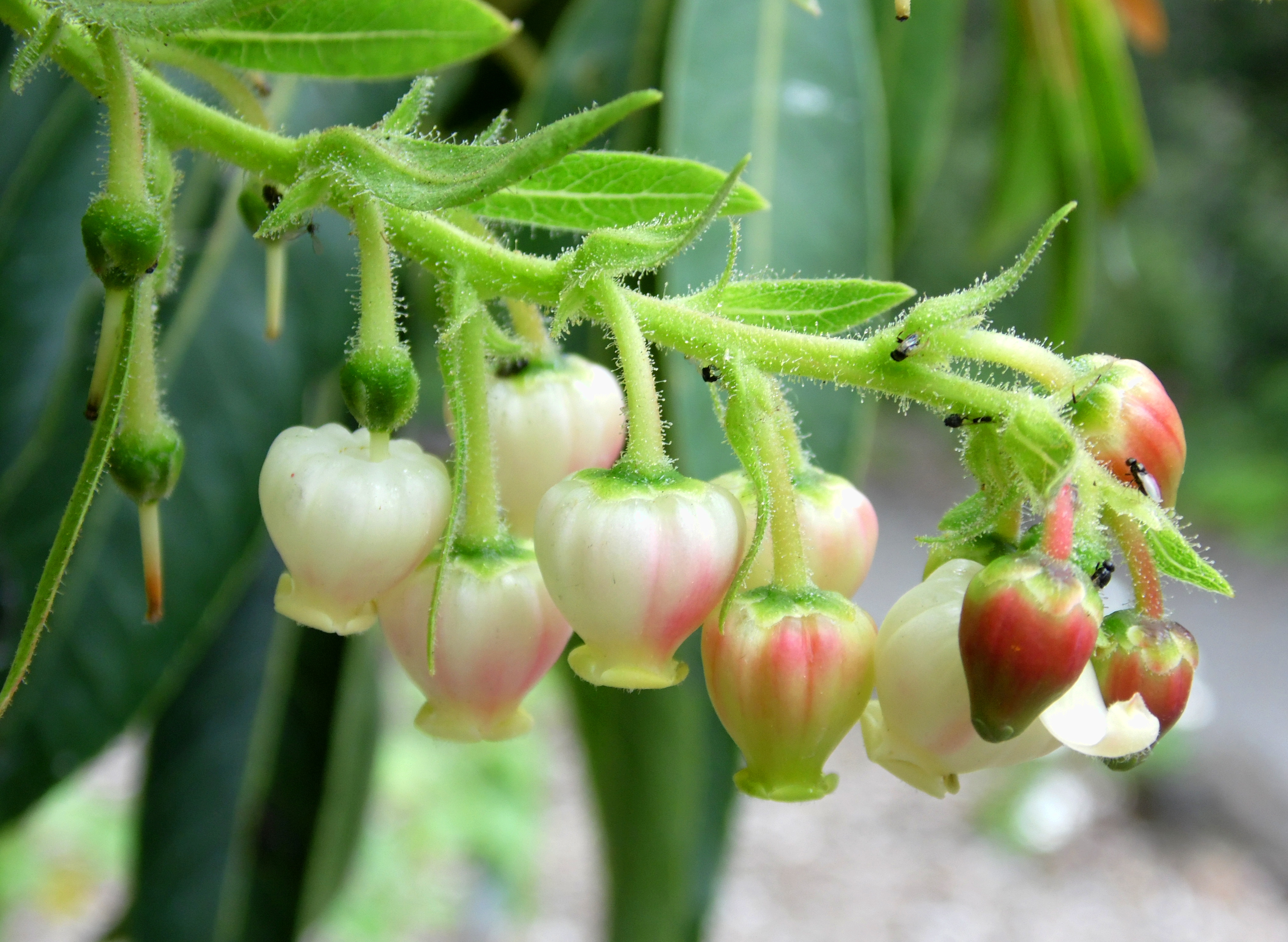
Flowers
