= José de Sigüenza =

Spanish theologian (1544–1606)

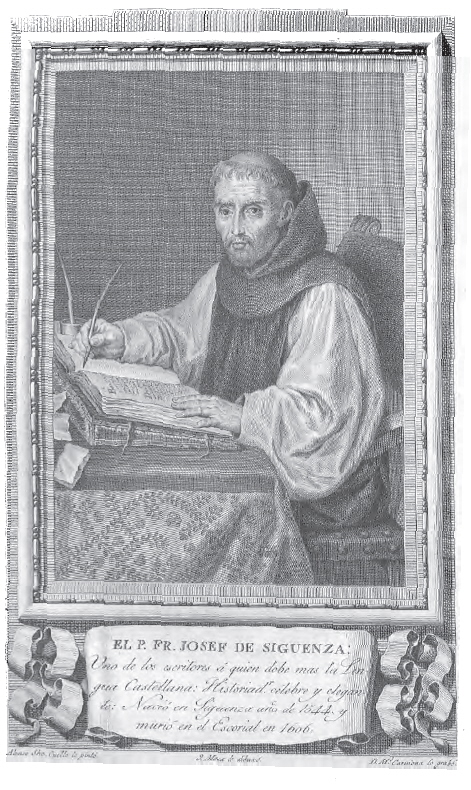
José de Sigüenza

José de Sigüenza (Sigüenza, 1544 - El Escorial, 22 May 1606) was a monk of the Order of Saint Jerome, historian, poet, and theologian. Under Philip II he was the prior of the monastery of El Escorial, where he served as both librarian and historian.

He is best known for his works on ecclesiastical history, in particular his History of the Order of St. Jerome (ca.1605), which discusses in detail the construction of El Escorial. He also wrote a work on the life of Saint Jerome, published in 1595, an English edition of which was printed in the early twentieth century. He also wrote extensively about the art work of Heironymus Bosch. He left unfinished a book on the life of Jesus that goes only as far as the adoration of the shepherds and was not printed until 1916 in three books.
