= Jardin botanique de la Villa Thuret =

French botanical garden on the Côte d'Azur

Coordinates: 43°33′50″N 7°7′28″E

- Interactive map of Jardin botanique de la Villa Thuret
- Type: Botanical garden
- Location: Antibes Juan-les-Pins, Alpes-Maritimes, Provence-Alpes-Côte d'Azur, France

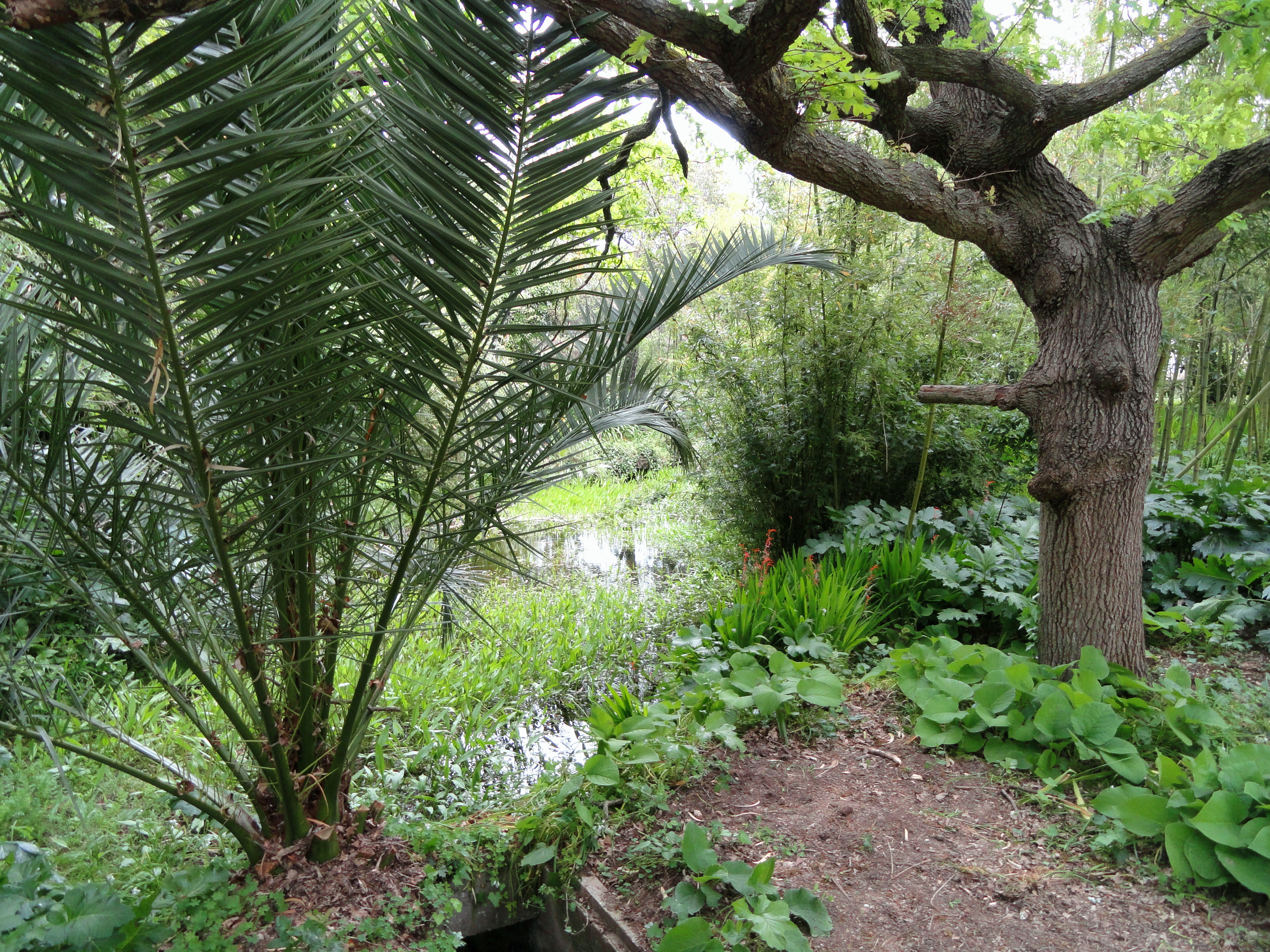
Jardin botanique de la Villa Thuret

The Jardin botanique de la Villa Thuret (3.5 hectares (8.6 acres)) is a renowned botanical garden located on the grounds of the Villa Thuret, 90, chemin Raymond, Antibes Juan-les-Pins, Alpes-Maritimes, Provence-Alpes-Côte d'Azur, France. It is open weekdays without charge.

== Overview ==
The garden was created in 1857 by Gustave Thuret (1817–1875), a botanist best known for studies of reproduction in algae, who used it to conduct plant acclimatization trials with friend and lichen expert Jean-Baptiste Édouard Bornet (1828–1911). In 1868, novelist George Sand described it in her Traveller's Letters as the loveliest garden she had ever seen. It was bequeathed to the nation in 1878, and in 1927 attached to the Institute of Agronomic Research, which in 1946 became the Institut National de la Recherche Agronomique (INRA).

Today the garden contains approximately 2,500 trees and shrubs in its collections, representing some 1,600 exotic species (144 genera, 131 families) from Mediterranean or hot climate countries including South Africa, Australia, California, Chile, and Mexico, as well as China, Japan, and New Zealand. About 50 to 100 new species are planted each year.

The garden contains fine collections of cycads, conifers (with an exceptional collection of cypress), palms (30 species including excellent specimens of Jubaea), legumes (various species of Australian acacias), Mediterranean oaks, Australian Myrtaceae (Callistemon, Calothamnus, Eucalyptus, Melaleuca), a large collection of Pittosporum spp., and Proteaceae including Banksia, Grevillea, Hakea, and Leucadendron.

Noteworthy specimens include a magnificent Jubaea spectabilis, as well as very fine specimens of Arbutus xalapensis, Agathis robusta, Cupressus macrocarpa, Eucalyptus benthamii, Melaleuca linariifolia, and Taxodium mucronatum.

== See also ==
- List of botanical gardens in France
