= Gustave Thuret =

French diplomat and botanist

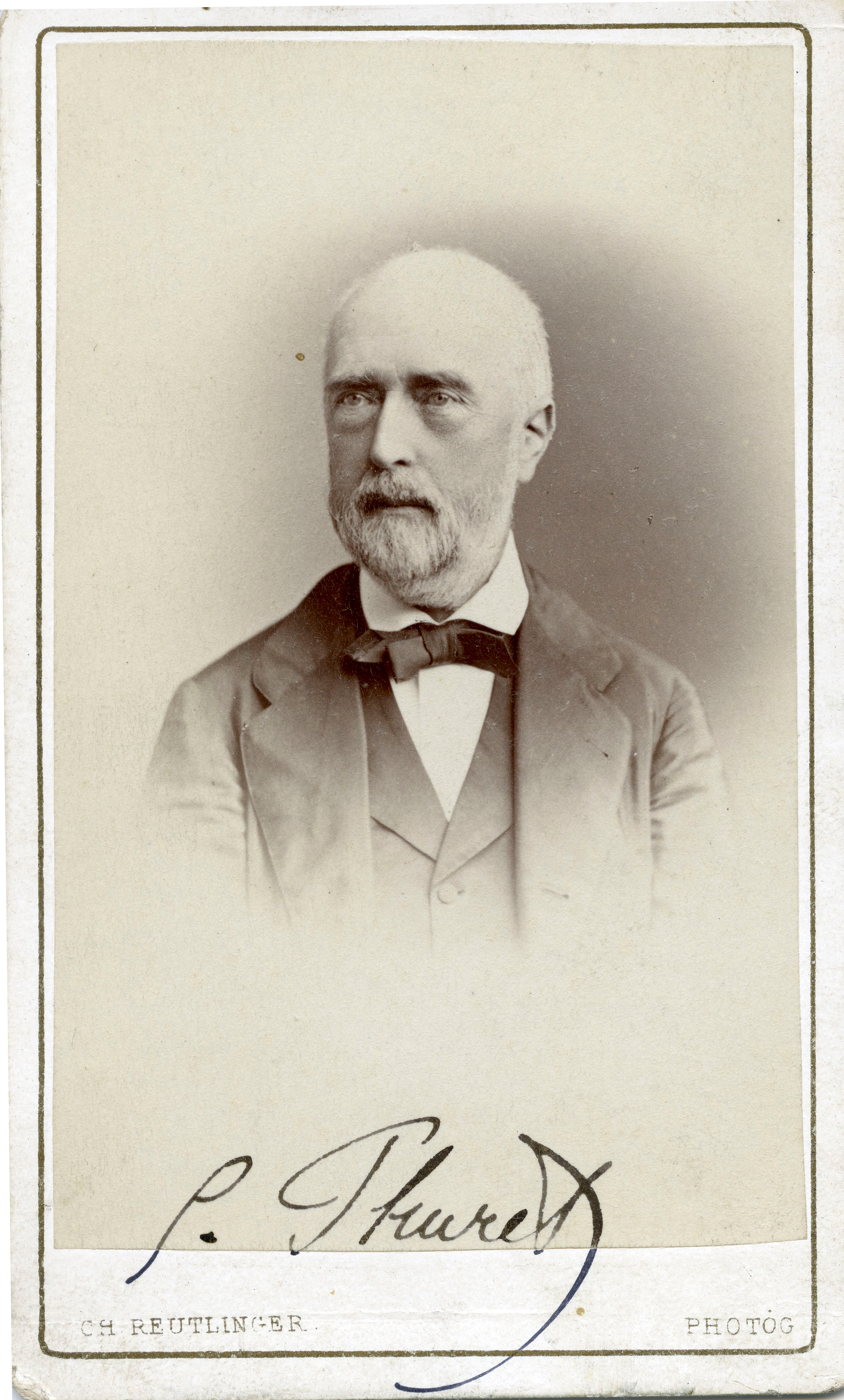
Thuret in 1867

Gustave Adolphe Thuret (23 May 1817 – 10 May 1875) was a French botanist, and founder of the Jardin botanique de la Villa Thuret. His speciality was marine algae.

== Biography ==
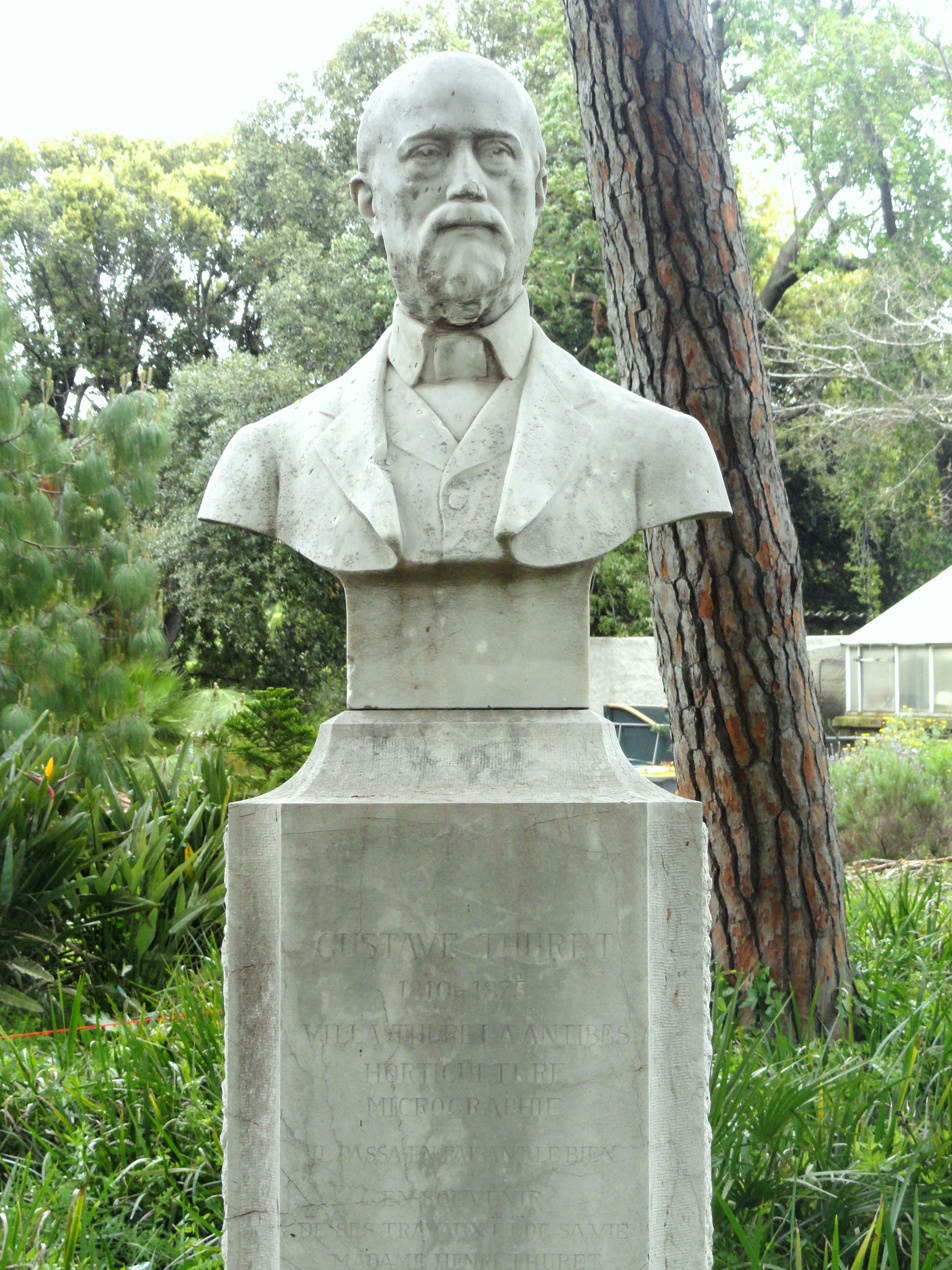
Gustave Thuret, memorial bust in the Jardin botanique de la Villa Thuret

Born in Paris, he belonged to an old Huguenot family, which had sought refuge in Weesp (Dutch Republic) after the revocation of the Edict of Nantes. In 1808 his father, a merchant and banker, married in London Henrietta van der Paadevoort (Padevoirt), the daughter of a navy officer, born in Demerara (now Guyana), but brought up or educated in England. In 1811 the family moved from Bath to Paris, where Isaac Thuret was appointed as the Dutch consul. As a young man Gustave studied Law, while being an amateur musician, and it was from a musical friend, de Villers, that he received, in 1837, his first initiation into botany. Beginning simply as a collector, he soon came under the influence of Joseph Decaisne, whose pupil he became. It was Decaisne who first encouraged him to undertake those algological studies which were to become the chief work of his life.

Thuret twice visited Istanbul in company with the French ambassador, Edouard Pontois, and was for a time attache to the French embassy to the Ottoman Empire. His diplomatic career, though of short duration, gave him a valuable opportunity of studying the Oriental flora. After travelling in Syria and Egypt in the autumn of 1841, he returned to France.

Giving up his intention of entering the civil service, he retired to his father's country house at Rentilly, and thereafter devoted himself to scientific research. He had already, in 1840, published his first scientific paper, Notes sur 1ère anthere de Chara et les animalcules qu'elle renferme, in which he first accurately described the organs of motion of the "animalcules" or spermatozoids of these plants. He continued his studies of the zoospores and male cells of Algae and other similar plants, and contributed to the understanding of such motile stages in vegetable life.

Thuret spent a great part of his time, up to 1857, on the Atlantic coast of France, carrying out an intense observation of marine Algae in their natural habitat at all seasons. In conjunction with his friend Edouard Bornet, he became the recognized authority on this group of plants, of which the two colleagues acquired an unrivalled knowledge. Their work, while noted for taxonomic accuracy, was more especially concentrated on the natural history, development and modes of reproduction of the plants investigated. They did much work in the area of sexual reproduction in seaweeds.

The researches on the fertilization of the Fucaceae were published by Thuret in 1853 and 1855; the complicated and difficult question of the sexual reproduction in Floridae was solved by the joint work of Thuret and Bornet (1867). Alongside the important discoveries in this area, the two scientists' researches helped elucidate every group of marine Algae. Thuret's style in expounding his results was hailed as singularly clear and concise; a man of thorough education, he was also noted for expressing his ideas with literary skill. Much of his best work remained unpublished during his life. A portion of the material accumulated by himself and his colleague was embodied in two magnificent works published after his death the Notes algologiques (1876–1880), and Études phycologiques (1878). These volumes, as well as earlier memoirs, are illustrated by accurate drawings by the artist Alfred Riocreux, whom Thuret employed.

In 1857 Thuret moved his research to Antibes (on the Mediterranean coast), where, on a once barren promontory, he established a botanical garden which became famous throughout the scientific world. Since his death the garden (now known as the Jardin botanique de la Villa Thuret) has been placed at the disposal of botanical workers as an institute for research.

Thuret died suddenly, while on a visit to Nice. He was a man of considerable wealth, which, together with his time and interest, he devoted to science.
