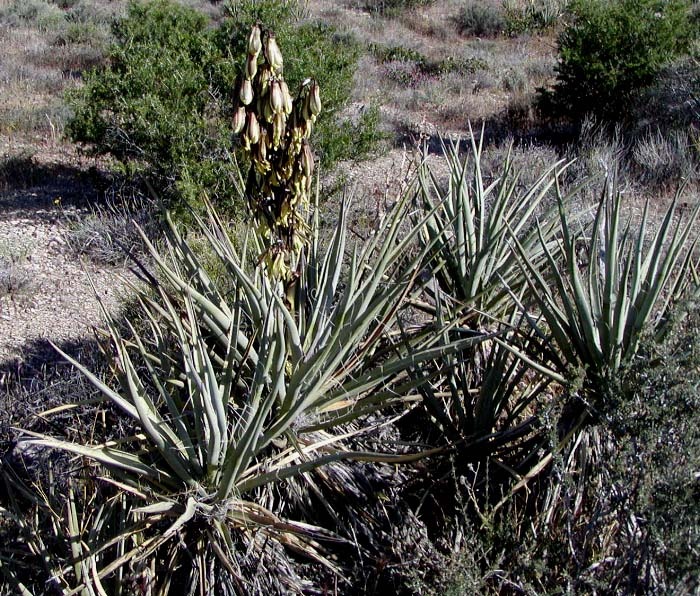
- Yucca baccata at Red Rock Canyon

Conservation status
- Least Concern (IUCN 3.1)

Scientific classification
- Kingdom: Plantae
- Clade: Embryophytes
- Clade: Tracheophytes
- Clade: Spermatophytes
- Clade: Angiosperms
- Clade: Monocots
- Order: Asparagales
- Family: Asparagaceae
- Subfamily: Agavoideae
- Genus: Yucca
- Species: Y. baccata

Binomial name
- Yucca baccata Torr. in Emory

Synonyms
- Sarcoyucca baccata (Torr.) Linding.; Yucca baccata f. genuina Engelm.

= Yucca baccata =

Banana yucca

Yucca with banana-shaped fruit

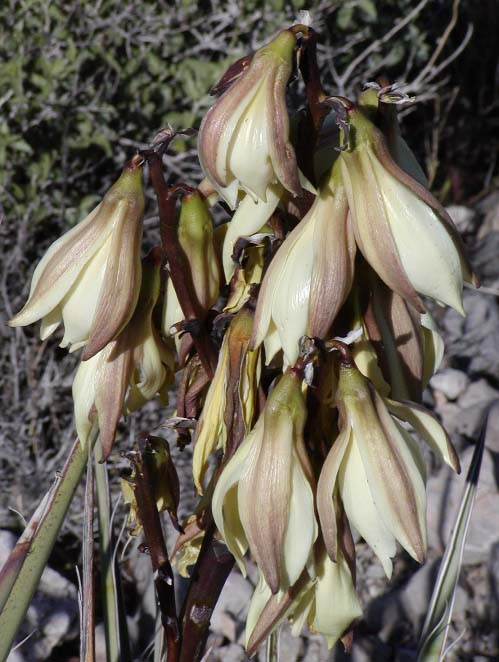
Yucca baccata flowers

Yucca baccata (datil yucca or banana yucca, also known as Spanish bayonet and broadleaf yucca) is a common species of yucca native to the deserts of the Southwestern United States and three states in Northern Mexico.

The species gets its common name "banana yucca" from its banana-shaped fruit. The specific epithet baccata means 'with berries'. Banana yucca is closely related to the Yucca schidigera, the Mojave yucca, with which it is interspersed where their ranges overlap; hybrids between them occur.

== Description ==
Yucca baccata is recognized by having leaves 50–76 cm (20–30 in) long with a blue-green color, and short or nonexistent trunks. It flowers in the spring, starting in April to July depending on locality (altitude), and the flowers range from 5 to 13 cm (2 to 5 in) long, in six segments, white to cream-coloured with purple shades. The flower stalk is not especially tall, typically 1–1.5 m (3 1/2–5 ft). The seeds are rough, black, wingless, 3–8 mm (1/8–3/8 in) long and wide, 1–2 mm (1/32–3/32 in) thick; they ripen in 6–8 weeks. The indehiscent fleshy fruit is 8–18 cm (3–7 in) long and 6 cm (2 1/2 in) across, cylindrical, and tastes similar to sweet potato.

== Subspecies ==
Yucca baccata has been divided into three varieties:

- Yucca baccata var. baccata
- Yucca baccata var. brevifolia (Schott ex Torr.) L. Benson & Darrow
- Yucca baccata var. vespertina (McKelvey) Hochstätter

As of 2023 the status of these subspecies is uncertain. In Plants of the World Online (POWO) and World Flora Online only Yucca baccata var. brevifolia and the autonym are listed as accepted.

Several botanical synonyms are listed by POWO for each of the species recognized there. Yucca baccata var. baccata:

- Yucca baccata f. fragilifolia (Baker) Voss
- Yucca baccata var. hystrix Baker
- Yucca baccata subsp. vespertina (McKelvey) Hochstätter
- Yucca baccata var. vespertina McKelvey
- Yucca filifera Engelm.
- Yucca fragilifolia Baker
- Yucca hanburyi Baker
- Yucca scabrifolia Baker
- Yucca vespertina (McKelvey) S.L.Welsh

Yucca baccata var. brevifolia:

- Yucca arizonica McKelvey
- Yucca baccata subsp. thornberi (McKelvey) Hochstätter
- Yucca brevifolia Schott ex Trel.
- Yucca confinis McKelvey
- Yucca thornberi McKelvey
- Yucca treleasei J.F.Macbr.

== Distribution and habitat ==
Banana yuccas is native to the southwestern United States and northern Mexico. The larger part of its range is in the US where it grows in Colorado, Utah, Nevada, California, Arizona, New Mexico, and Texas. In Mexico it is found in three states, Sonora, Chihuahua, and Coahuila. The plant is known from the Great Basin, the Mojave, Sonoran, and Chihuahuan Deserts, plus the Arizona/New Mexico Mountains ecoregion and lower, southern parts of the Rocky Mountains. It can be found in several habitat types including Pinyon-Juniper, desert grassland, Creosote bush scrub, sagebrush, and ponderosa pine colonies at elevations generally between 1,500 and 2,500 m (4,900 and 8,200 ft).

It is associated with Yucca schidigera, Yucca brevifolia, Yucca arizonica, Yucca faxoniana, Agave utahensis, and other Agave species. It can be found among Sclerocactus, Pediocactus, Navajoa, and Toumeya species.

The plant occurs in a large area of the North American deserts and exhibits much variation across its range. Yucca baccata specimens from the higher, mountainous regions of the Rocky Mountains is winterhardy and tolerates extreme conditions.

== Ecology ==
It serves as a larval host for the ursine giant skipper, yucca giant skipper, and various yucca moths, including Tegeticula baccatella. After feeding, the skippers pupate in the yucca's roots.

== Uses ==
The young flower stalks can be cooked and eaten, with the tough outer rind discarded. The fruit can be eaten raw or cooked, in the latter case resembling sweet potato.

The Paiutes dried the fruits for use during the winter. It is still a popular food amongst Mexican Indians. The flowers are often eaten by rural residents.

Ancestral Puebloan peoples used the fibers derived from the leaves to create sandals and cordage, and the root was used as soap, although with less frequency than that of Yucca elata.
