= Tegeticula corruptrix =

Scientific classification
- Kingdom: Animalia
- Phylum: Arthropoda
- Clade: Pancrustacea
- Class: Insecta
- Order: Lepidoptera
- Family: Prodoxidae
- Genus: Tegeticula
- Species: T. corruptrix

Binomial name
- Tegeticula corruptrix Pellmyr, 1999

Species of moth

Tegeticula corruptrix is a moth of the family Prodoxidae. It is found in North America in south-western California, Arizona, New Mexico, northern Coahuila, western and southern Texas, Colorado, Alberta, the western plains of Nebraska, Wyoming and Montana.

The wingspan is 22.5–35 mm (0.89–1.38 in).

The larvae feed on Yucca baccata, Yucca treculeana, Yucca torreyi, Yucca schidigera, Yucca glauca, Yucca baileyi, Yucca elata and Yucca verdiensis.

This species was called a "cheater" by its original describer because it lays eggs in the developing seeds and fruits of yucca plants without pollinating the flowers, unlike other yucca moths.
