= Tegeticula carnerosanella =

Scientific classification
- Kingdom: Animalia
- Phylum: Arthropoda
- Clade: Pancrustacea
- Class: Insecta
- Order: Lepidoptera
- Family: Prodoxidae
- Genus: Tegeticula
- Species: T. carnerosanella

Binomial name
- Tegeticula carnerosanella Pellmyr, 1999

Species of moth

Tegeticula carnerosanella is a moth of the family Prodoxidae. It is found from western Texas in the United States south to Mexico. The habitat consists of shrub desert.

The wingspan is 20-27.5 mm. Both the forewings and hindwings are white. The larvae feed on Yucca carnerosana and Yucca faxoniana.
