= Tegeticula antithetica =

Scientific classification
- Domain: Eukaryota
- Kingdom: Animalia
- Phylum: Arthropoda
- Class: Insecta
- Order: Lepidoptera
- Family: Prodoxidae
- Genus: Tegeticula
- Species: T. antithetica

Binomial name
- Tegeticula antithetica Pellmyr, 2003

Species of moth

Tegeticula antithetica is a species of moth in the family Prodoxidae. It is found in the Mojave Desert of the North American southwest, specifically southern California, southern Nevada, southwestern Utah, and western Arizona.

The larvae feed on Yucca brevifolia. Most Tegeticula species, including T. antithetica, are monophagous, and the adult moths only live for a few days, so they must access the plant during the short flowering period. This indicates that moth populations would have to be locally adapted for the flowering periods their specific hosts.

Godsoe, et al. (2008) presented convincing evidence for coevolution of Tegeticula synthetica and Tegeticula antithetica by showing the exclusive relationship between the two species and their respective populations of Yucca brevifolia, with antithetica being limited to Y. brevifolia var. jaegeriana. Perhaps most importantly, Godsoe et al. showed that only the reproductive features of the moths and plants have been evolving—ovipositor length and floral characters, respectively—and not body size or vegetative features, respectively. This indicates that only reciprocal sexual selection, and not extrinsic forces (such as climate, etc.), has been acting on the evolution of the two species.
