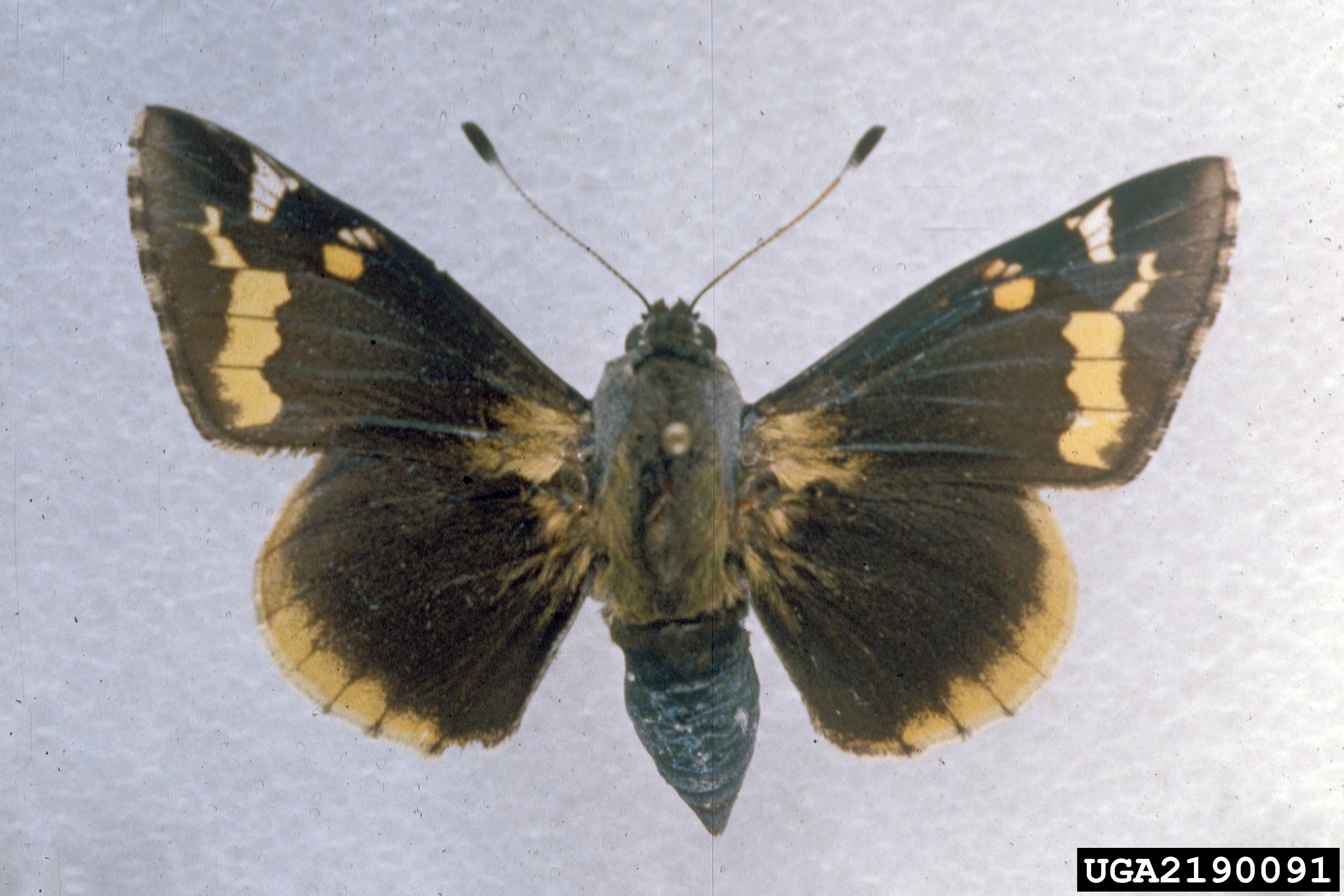

Conservation status
- Secure (NatureServe)

Scientific classification
- Kingdom: Animalia
- Phylum: Arthropoda
- Class: Insecta
- Order: Lepidoptera
- Family: Hesperiidae
- Genus: Megathymus
- Species: M. yuccae

Binomial name
- Megathymus yuccae (Boisduval & Le Conte, 1837)

Subspecies
- Megathymus yuccae harbisoni; Megathymus yuccae arizonae; Megathymus yuccae reubeni; Megathymus yuccae louiseae; Megathymus yuccae wilsonorum

Synonyms
- Eudamua yuccae (Boisduval & LeConte, 1834)

= Megathymus yuccae =

Species of butterfly

Megathymus yuccae, the yucca giant-skipper, is a rare early season butterfly that is widespread across the southern United States. It belongs in the family Hesperiidae, subfamily Megathyminae.

== Description ==
The upper side of the wings are brown with the forewings having yellow spots. The under side is mainly mottled with black and gray. The wingspan is 48–79 mm (1.9–3.1 in). Caterpillars feed on Yucca species such as Y. filamentosa, Y. smalliana, Y. gloriosa, Y. elata, Y. arizonica, and Y. aloifolia. Although adults do not feed, males will gather moisture from mud.

== Habitat ==
This butterfly may be seen in deserts, foothills, and woodlands where yucca plants, in which their eggs are laid, occur.
