= Tegeticula cassandra =

Scientific classification
- Kingdom: Animalia
- Phylum: Arthropoda
- Clade: Pancrustacea
- Class: Insecta
- Order: Lepidoptera
- Family: Prodoxidae
- Genus: Tegeticula
- Species: T. cassandra

Binomial name
- Tegeticula cassandra Pellmyr, 1999

Species of moth

Tegeticula cassandra is a moth of the family Prodoxidae. It is found in the United States in north-central Florida and bordering areas of Georgia. The habitat consists of open pine and pine-oak forests and open grassy areas with oak scrub.

T. cassandra is very closely related to Tegeticula intermedia, a yucca moth that is found more so in the southwestern part of the United States. Both exhibit behavior that is considered cheating since neither pollinate their host yucca plants that they lay their eggs upon.

The wingspan is 20–27 mm. The forewings are white and the hindwings are dark gray with a brown tinge.

The larvae feed on Yucca filamentosa, Yucca smalliana, Yucca flaccida and possibly Yucca aloifolia. They feed on developing seeds. Pupation takes place in a cocoon in the soil.
