= Spanish bayonet =

Spanish bayonet or Spanish dagger is a common name for several plants and may refer to:

- Hesperoyucca whipplei — Southern California, United States and Baja California, Mexico.
- Yucca aloifolia — Southeastern U.S., Mexico, Caribbean.
- Yucca faxoniana — Chihuahuan Desert region of northern Mexico and Southwestern U.S.
- Yucca gloriosa — Southeastern U.S.
- Yucca harrimaniae — Rocky Mountains and Great Basin of the Southwestern U.S.
- Yucca schidigera — Mojave Desert and Sonoran Desert regions of Southwestern U.S. and northern Mexico.
- Yucca treculeana — Texas, New Mexico, Coahuila

== See also ==
- Adam's needle
