= Adam's needle =

Adam's needle is a common name for several plants in the genus Yucca and may refer to:

- Yucca filamentosa, native to the southeastern United States
- Yucca flaccida
- Yucca gloriosa, native to the southeastern United States

== See also ==
- Spanish bayonet
