= Tegeticula superficiella =

Scientific classification
- Kingdom: Animalia
- Phylum: Arthropoda
- Clade: Pancrustacea
- Class: Insecta
- Order: Lepidoptera
- Family: Prodoxidae
- Genus: Tegeticula
- Species: T. superficiella

Binomial name
- Tegeticula superficiella Pellmyr, 1999

Species of moth

Tegeticula superficiella is a moth of the family Prodoxidae. It is found in the United States in south-western Utah and northern Arizona. The habitat consists of shrub desert and open pine forests.

The wingspan is 20.5–30 mm.

The larvae feed on Yucca elata var. utahensis, Yucca baileyi and Yucca angustissima var. kanabensis.
