= Tegeticula elatella =

Scientific classification
- Kingdom: Animalia
- Phylum: Arthropoda
- Clade: Pancrustacea
- Class: Insecta
- Order: Lepidoptera
- Family: Prodoxidae
- Genus: Tegeticula
- Species: T. elatella

Binomial name
- Tegeticula elatella Pellmyr, 1999

Species of moth

Tegeticula elatella is a moth of the family Prodoxidae. It is found in the United States in western Texas, from the Big Bend region through southern New Mexico to south-eastern Arizona and the Verde Valley of central Arizona. The habitat consists of grassland and shrub desert.

The wingspan is 21–28 mm.

The larvae feed on Yucca verdiensis. They feed on developing seeds. Pupation takes place in a cocoon in the soil.
