= Tegeticula mojavella =

Scientific classification
- Kingdom: Animalia
- Phylum: Arthropoda
- Clade: Pancrustacea
- Class: Insecta
- Order: Lepidoptera
- Family: Prodoxidae
- Genus: Tegeticula
- Species: T. mojavella

Binomial name
- Tegeticula mojavella Pellmyr, 1999

Species of moth

Tegeticula mojavella is a moth of the family Prodoxidae. It is found in the United States in the Mojave Desert, from southern Nevada and California south to the Mexican border. The habitat consists of bajadas and lower slopes of open desert.

Its wingspan is 19–24.5 mm.

The larvae feed on Yucca schidigera. They feed on developing seeds.
