= Tegeticula californica =

Scientific classification
- Kingdom: Animalia
- Phylum: Arthropoda
- Clade: Pancrustacea
- Class: Insecta
- Order: Lepidoptera
- Family: Prodoxidae
- Genus: Tegeticula
- Species: T. californica

Binomial name
- Tegeticula californica Pellmyr, 2008

Species of moth

Tegeticula californica is a moth of the family Prodoxidae. It is found along the coast of southernmost California, United States.

The wingspan is 23.4-25.5 mm for males and 27.5–30 mm for females.

The larvae feed on Yucca schidigera.
