= Tegeticula mexicana =

Scientific classification
- Kingdom: Animalia
- Phylum: Arthropoda
- Clade: Pancrustacea
- Class: Insecta
- Order: Lepidoptera
- Family: Prodoxidae
- Genus: Tegeticula
- Species: T. mexicana

Binomial name
- Tegeticula mexicana Bastida, 1962

Synonyms
- Tegeticula treculeanella Pellmyr, 1999

Species of moth

Tegeticula mexicana is a moth of the family Prodoxidae. It is found in the United States in Texas, New Mexico and in Mexico (including Coahuila). The habitat consists of desert flats and low slopes in the Chihuahuan Desert and open shrubland and grassland in coastal regions.

The wingspan is 19.5–29.5 mm. The forewings are white and the hindwings are brownish gray.

The larvae feed on Yucca treculeana and Yucca torreyi. They feed on developing seeds. Pupation takes place in a cocoon in the soil.
