= Tegeticula altiplanella =

Scientific classification
- Kingdom: Animalia
- Phylum: Arthropoda
- Clade: Pancrustacea
- Class: Insecta
- Order: Lepidoptera
- Family: Prodoxidae
- Genus: Tegeticula
- Species: T. altiplanella

Binomial name
- Tegeticula altiplanella Pellmyr, 1999

Species of moth

Tegeticula altiplanella is a moth of the family Prodoxidae. It is found in the United States in the mountains and high plains of Colorado, southern Utah, northern Arizona and New Mexico. The habitat consists of high brush deserts, rock outcrops, volcanic tuff soils in open forests and high grassland.

The wingspan is 18–27.5 mm.
