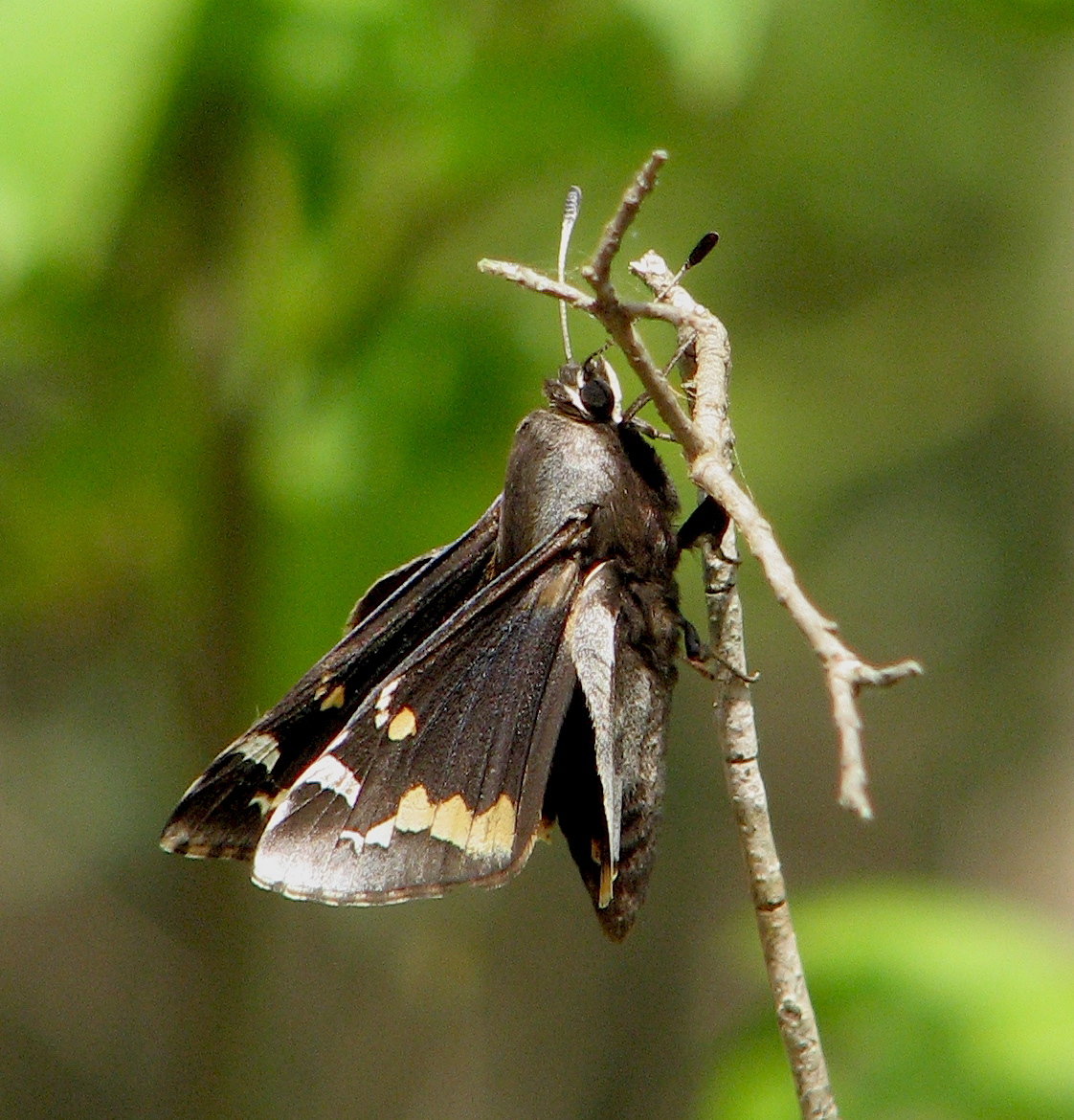
- Megathymus yuccae

Scientific classification
- Kingdom: Animalia
- Phylum: Arthropoda
- Class: Insecta
- Order: Lepidoptera
- Family: Hesperiidae
- Subfamily: Megathyminae
- Genus: Megathymus; Scudder, 1872

Species
- See text.

= Megathymus =

Genus of butterflies

Megathymus is a genus of butterflies in the skipper family, Hesperiidae.

== Species ==
The following species and subspecies are recognized:

- Megathymus streckeri (Skinner, 1895) – Strecker's giant-skipper
  - Megathymus streckeri streckeri (Skinner, 1895) – Northeastern Arizona, northwestern New Mexico, southwestern Colorado, southeastern Utah
  - Megathymus streckeri Navajo County, Arizona segregate – Southern Navajo Co., Arizona; south end White Mountains, Arizona
  - Megathymus streckeri leussleri W. Holland, 1931 – Texas panhandle & eastern New Mexico to eastern Montana and western North Dakota (possibly southeastern Saskatchewan)
  - Megathymus streckeri texana W. Barnes & McDunnough, 1912 – South-central Texas
- Megathymus cofaqui (Strecker, 1876) – Cofaqui giant-skipper
  - Megathymus cofaqui cofaqui (Strecker, 1876) [= harrisi] – Georgia to North Carolina
  - Megathymus cofaqui slotteni Gatrelle, 1999 – Florida
- Megathymus yuccae (Boisduval & Le Conte, 1837) – Yucca giant-skipper
  - Megathymus yuccae yuccae (Boisduval & Le Conte, 1837) [= buchholzi] – Southeastern USA, east of the Mississippi River
  - Megathymus yuccae reinthali H. Freeman, 1963 [= kendalli] – Central to northeastern Texas, central & eastern Oklahoma, southwestern Arkansas, northern & central Louisiana
  - Megathymus yuccae wilsonorum D. Stallings & J. Turner, 1958 – Tamaulipas & far southern Texas (Lower Rio Grande Valley)
  - Megathymus yuccae louiseae H. Freeman, 1963 – South-central Texas (Val Verde & Kinney counties) to northeastern Mexico (Coahuila, Nuevo León)
  - Megathymus yuccae coloradensis C. Riley, 1877 – Southeastern Wyoming, western Nebraska, western Kansas, eastern Colorado, eastern New Mexico, western Oklahoma, Texas panhandle
  - Megathymus yuccae reubeni D. Stallings, J. Turner & V. Stallings, 1963 – Hueco Mountains (Hudspeth Co., Texas) to northern Chihuahua
  - Megathymus yuccae navajo Skinner, 1911 [= arizonae] – Western Colorado, southern Utah, western New Mexico, Arizona, northern Sonora
  - Megathymus yuccae martini D. Stallings & J. Turner, 1956 – Mojave Desert (southern California, western Nevada, far northwestern Arizona)
  - Megathymus yuccae harbisoni J. Emmel & T. Emmel, 1998 – Beaumont (Riverside Co., California) south to Baja California Norte
- Megathymus beulahae D. Stallings & J. Turner, 1958 – Broad-banded giant-skipper
  - Megathymus beulahae gayleae D. Stallings, J. Turner & V. Stallings, 1963 – Coahuila, Nuevo León, Tamaulipas, San Luis Potosí
  - Megathymus beulahae beulahae D. Stallings & J. Turner, 1958 – Hidalgo
- Megathymus ursus Poling, 1902 – Ursine giant-skipper
  - Megathymus ursus ursus Poling, 1902 – Southern Arizona (Pinal, Pima, Santa Cruz, Cochise counties), southwestern New Mexico (Hidalgo Co.), Sonora
  - Megathymus ursus deserti R. Wielgus, J. Wielgus & D. Wielgus, 1972 – Eastern Maricopa County, Arizona
- Megathymus violae D. Stallings & J. Turner, 1956 – Ursine giant-skipper – Central & southern New Mexico (east of Rio Grande), western Texas, Coahuila, Nuevo León
