= Tegeticula baja =

Scientific classification
- Kingdom: Animalia
- Phylum: Arthropoda
- Clade: Pancrustacea
- Class: Insecta
- Order: Lepidoptera
- Family: Prodoxidae
- Genus: Tegeticula
- Species: T. baja

Binomial name
- Tegeticula baja Pellmyr & Balcázar-Lara, 2008

Species of moth

Tegeticula baja is a moth of the family Prodoxidae. It is found in Mexico on the Baja California Peninsula.

The wingspan is 18.3–20 mm for males and 20.5–23 mm for females. Adults are on wing in August.

The larvae feed on Yucca valida and Yucca capensis.
