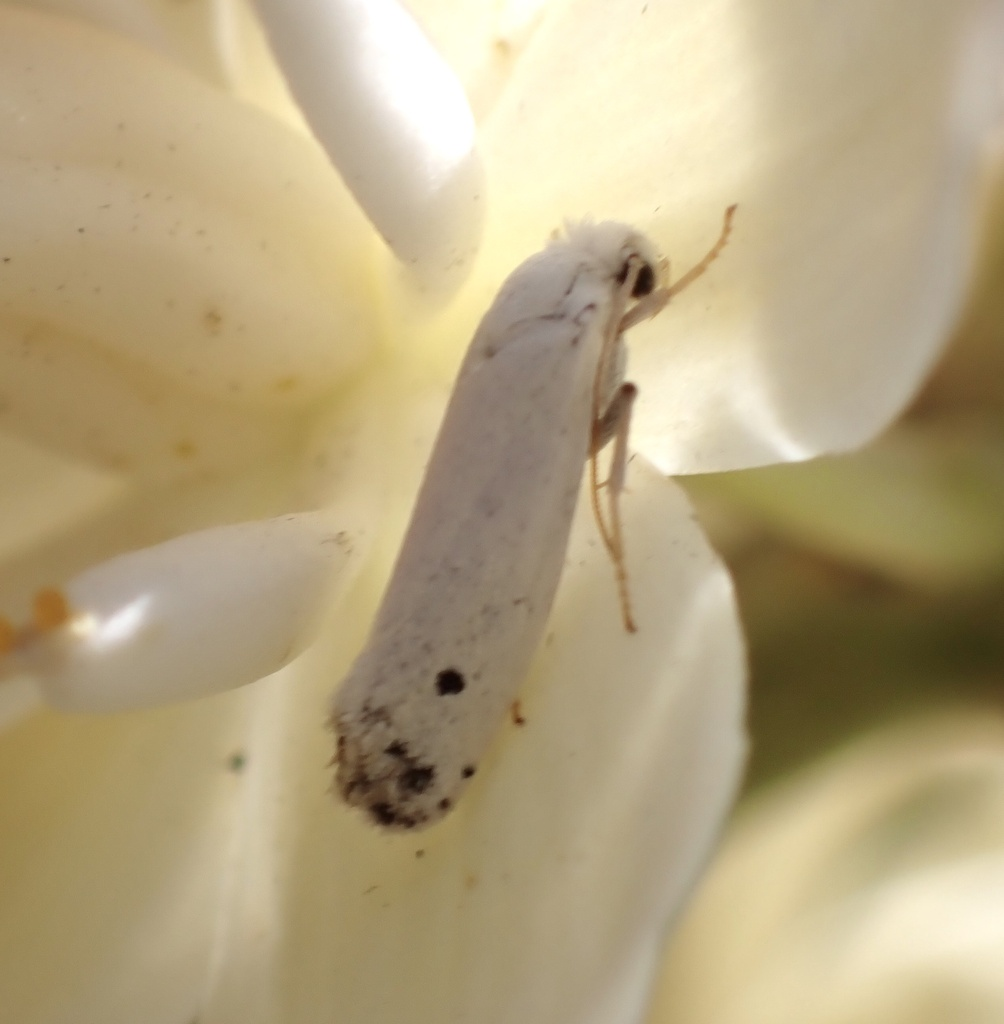

Scientific classification
- Kingdom: Animalia
- Phylum: Arthropoda
- Clade: Pancrustacea
- Class: Insecta
- Order: Lepidoptera
- Family: Prodoxidae
- Genus: Tegeticula
- Species: T. maculata

Binomial name
- Tegeticula maculata (Riley, 1881)

Synonyms
- Pronuba maculata Riley, 1881; Pronuba apicella Dyar, 1903; Thia extranea Edwards, 1888; Pronuba aterrima Trelease, 1893

= Tegeticula maculata =

Species of moth

Tegeticula maculata, the chaparral yucca moth, is a moth of the family Prodoxidae. It is found in North America in central-southern cismontane California, in the Sierra Nevada north to Fresno County, in north-western Arizona, and from Baja California Norte to the Vizcaino region. The habitat consists of coastal chaparral and montane dry shrubby grassland.

== Description ==
The wingspan is 16–23 mm for ssp. maculata.

== Ecology ==
The larvae feed exclusively on developing seeds of Hesperoyucca whipplei. It is the sole pollinator of Hesperoyucca whipplei.

== Subspecies ==
- Tegeticula maculata maculata
- Tegeticula maculata extranea (Edwards, 1888)
