= Tegeticula maderae =

Scientific classification
- Kingdom: Animalia
- Phylum: Arthropoda
- Clade: Pancrustacea
- Class: Insecta
- Order: Lepidoptera
- Family: Prodoxidae
- Genus: Tegeticula
- Species: T. maderae

Binomial name
- Tegeticula maderae Pellmyr, 1999

Species of moth

Tegeticula maderae is a moth of the family Prodoxidae. It is found in south-eastern Arizona, United States. The habitat consists of pine-oak forests.

The wingspan is 15–21.5 mm.

The larvae feed on Yucca schottii.
