= Tegeticula baccatella =

Scientific classification
- Kingdom: Animalia
- Phylum: Arthropoda
- Clade: Pancrustacea
- Class: Insecta
- Order: Lepidoptera
- Family: Prodoxidae
- Genus: Tegeticula
- Species: T. baccatella

Binomial name
- Tegeticula baccatella Pellmyr, 1999

Species of moth

Tegeticula baccatella is a moth of the family Prodoxidae. It is found in the United States in Arizona and New Mexico and adjacent regions of California, Nevada, Utah and Colorado. It is also found in western Texas (up to Presidio County). The habitat consists of shrub desert, rocky hillsides and open pine forests with outcrops.

The wingspan is 19.5–28 mm.

The larvae feed on Yucca baccata, Yucca thornberi and Yucca confinis. They feed on developing seeds.
