= Tegeticula rostratella =

Scientific classification
- Kingdom: Animalia
- Phylum: Arthropoda
- Clade: Pancrustacea
- Class: Insecta
- Order: Lepidoptera
- Family: Prodoxidae
- Genus: Tegeticula
- Species: T. rostratella

Binomial name
- Tegeticula rostratella Pellmyr, 1999

Species of moth

Tegeticula rostratella is a moth of the family Prodoxidae. It is found in the Big Bend region of the United States, south to the Mapimí region in southern Coahuila in Mexico. The habitat consists of scrub desert.

The wingspan is 18.5–26 mm.

The larvae feed on Yucca rostrata and Yucca rigida.
