= Tegeticula tambasi =

Scientific classification
- Kingdom: Animalia
- Phylum: Arthropoda
- Clade: Pancrustacea
- Class: Insecta
- Order: Lepidoptera
- Family: Prodoxidae
- Genus: Tegeticula
- Species: T. tambasi

Binomial name
- Tegeticula tambasi Pellmyr & Balcázar-Lara, 2008

Species of moth

Tegeticula tambasi is a moth of the family Prodoxidae. It is found in Mexico from northern central San Luis Potosí south-east to Querétaro, and south-westward beyond Morelia, Michoacán.

The wingspan is 20–24 mm for males and 26-27.5 mm for females. Adults are on wing from late May to mid-August.
