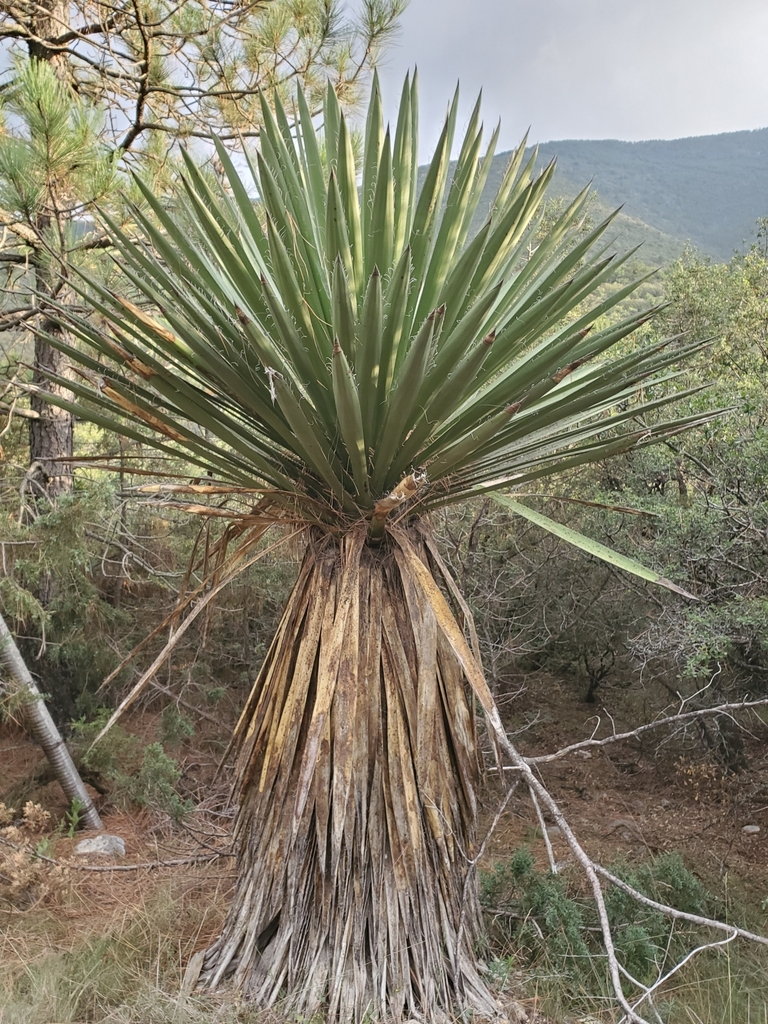

Conservation status
- Least Concern (IUCN 3.1)

Scientific classification
- Kingdom: Plantae
- Clade: Tracheophytes
- Clade: Angiosperms
- Clade: Monocots
- Order: Asparagales
- Family: Asparagaceae
- Subfamily: Agavoideae
- Genus: Yucca
- Species: Y. carnerosana

Binomial name
- Yucca carnerosana (Trel.) McKelvey

Synonyms
- Samulea carnerosana Trel.

= Yucca carnerosana =

Giant Spanish dagger

Species of flowering plant

Yucca carnerosana, commonly known as Carneros Yucca or Giant Spanish dagger, is a species of yucca of the far southeastern Chihuahuan Desert. The species occurs in northeastern Mexico (Coahuila, Durango, Zacatecas, Nuevo León).

Yucca carnerosana is a large arborescent yucca, sometimes branched, up to 20 feet tall, with snowy white flowers.

== Taxonomy ==
Trelease described the genus Samuela based on two species, Samuela faxoniana (now Yucca faxoniana) and S. carnerosana (now Yucca carnerosana).

The 2025 paper "Phylogenetic relationships and character evolution in Yucca (Agavoideae, Asparagaceae)" by Ayala-Hernandez et al. analyzed genetic data and found Yucca carnerosana and Yucca faxoniana to not only be distinct species, but of different lineages and not closely related to each other.
