= Tegeticula synthetica =

Scientific classification
- Kingdom: Animalia
- Phylum: Arthropoda
- Clade: Pancrustacea
- Class: Insecta
- Order: Lepidoptera
- Family: Prodoxidae
- Genus: Tegeticula
- Species: T. synthetica

Binomial name
- Tegeticula synthetica (Riley, 1892)

Synonyms
- Pronuba synthetica Riley, 1892; Pronuba paradoxa Trelease, 1893; Tegeticula paradoxa

Species of moth

Tegeticula synthetica is a moth of the family Prodoxidae. It is found in the United States in the Mojave Desert in southern Nevada, south-eastern California and from south-western Utah to north-western Arizona. The habitat consists of desert areas.

The wingspan is 17–21 mm.

The larvae feed on Yucca brevifolia. They feed on developing seeds.
