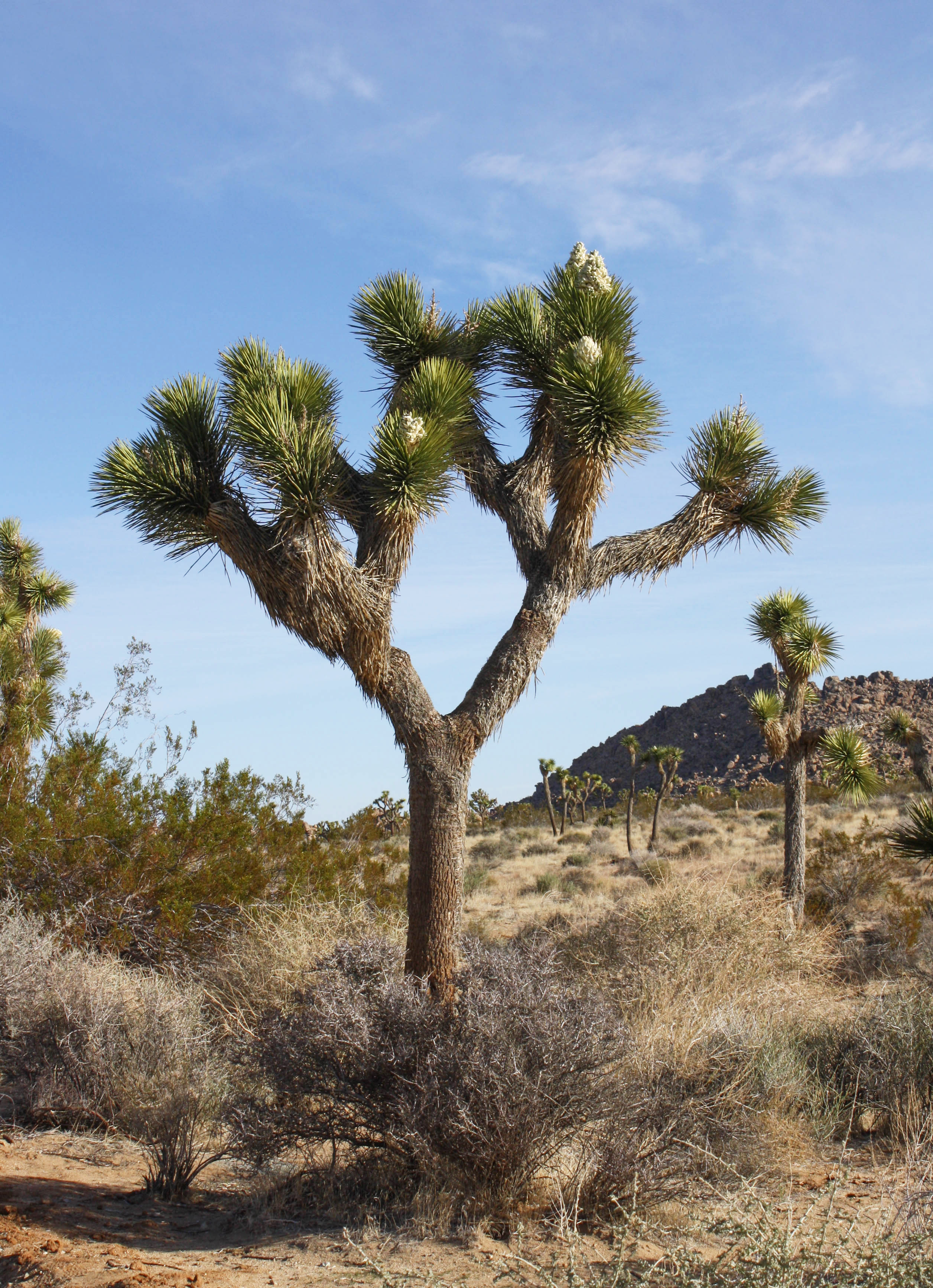
- In Joshua Tree National Park, California

Conservation status
- Least Concern (IUCN 3.1)

- Vulnerable (NatureServe)

Scientific classification
- Kingdom: Plantae
- Clade: Tracheophytes
- Clade: Angiosperms
- Clade: Monocots
- Order: Asparagales
- Family: Asparagaceae
- Subfamily: Agavoideae
- Genus: Yucca
- Species: Y. brevifolia

Binomial name
- Yucca brevifolia Engelm.
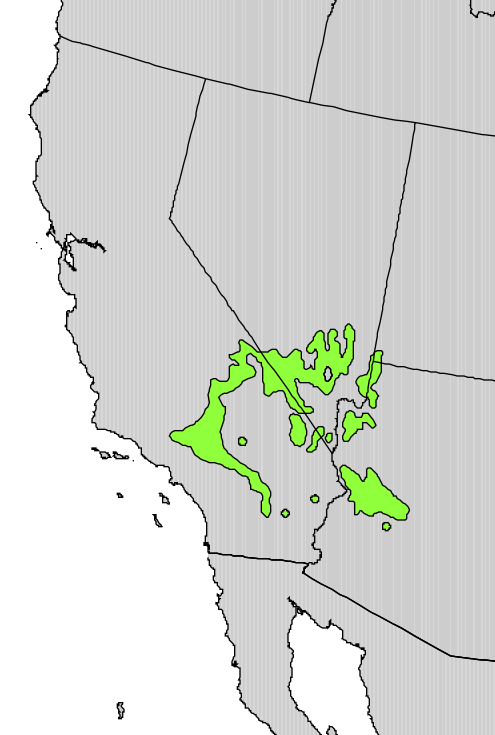
- Natural range in the United States

Synonyms
- Clistoyucca brevifolia (Engelm.) Rydb.; Sarcoyucca brevifolia (Engelm.) Linding.; Yucca arborescens (Torr.) Trel.; Yucca jaegeriana (McKelvey) L.W.Lenz; Yucca brevifolia subsp. jaegeriana (McKelvey) Hochstätter; Yucca brevifolia var. jaegerana McKelvey; Cleistoyucca arborescens (Torr.) Eastw.; Clistoyucca arborescens (Torr.) Trel.; Yucca arborescens (Torr.) Trel.; Yucca brevifolia var. herbertii (J.M. Webber) Munz; Yucca brevifolia fo. herbertii J.M. Webber; Yucca brevifolia subsp. herbertii (J.M. Webber) Hochstätter; Yucca brevifolia var. jaegerana McKelvey; Yucca draconis var. arborescens Torr.

= Yucca brevifolia =

Joshua tree

Species of plant

Yucca brevifolia, commonly known as the Joshua tree, yucca palm, tree yucca, or palm tree yucca, is a plant species belonging to the genus Yucca.

This monocotyledonous tree (Note: Y. brevifolia exhibits the habit of a tree, notwithstanding its distinction from other trees.) is native to the arid Southwestern United States (specifically California, Arizona, Utah, and Nevada), and northwestern Mexico. It is confined mostly to the Mojave Desert between 400 and 1,800 m (1,300 and 5,900 ft) elevation. It thrives in the open grasslands of Queen Valley and Lost Horse Valley in Joshua Tree National Park. Other regions with a large population of the trees can be found northeast of Kingman, Arizona, in Mohave County; and along U.S. 93 just south of the community of Meadview, Arizona, a route which has been designated the Joshua Tree Parkway of Arizona. The trees are also abundant in Saddleback Butte State Park 135 kilometers (85 miles) north of Downtown Los Angeles in Los Angeles County's Antelope Valley.

== Name and taxonomy ==
The Joshua tree is called "hunuvat chiy'a" or "humwichawa" by the indigenous Cahuilla. It is also called izote de desierto (Spanish, "desert dagger"). It was first formally described in the botanical literature as Yucca brevifolia by George Engelmann in 1871 as part of the Geological Exploration of the 100th meridian (or "Wheeler Survey").

The name "Joshua tree" is commonly said to have been given by a group of Mormon colonists crossing the Mojave Desert in the mid-19th century, who either saw a resemblance to Joshua praying during the conquest of Ai (Joshua 8:18–26) or imagined it leading them, like Joshua, through the landscape. Further, the shaggy leaves may have provided the appearance of a beard. However, no direct or contemporary attestation of this origin exists, and the name Joshua tree is not recorded until after Mormon contact; moreover, the physical appearance of the Joshua tree more closely resembles a similar story told of Moses.

Ranchers and miners who were contemporaneous with the Mormon immigrants used the trunks and branches as fencing and for fuel for ore-processing steam engines.

In addition to the autonymic subspecies Y. b. subsp. brevifolia, two other subspecies have been described: Y. b. subsp. herbertii (Webber's yucca or Herbert Joshua tree) and Y. b. subsp. jaegeriana (the Jaeger Joshua tree or Jaeger's Joshua tree or pygmae yucca), though both are sometimes treated as varieties or forms. Y.b. subsp. jaegeriana has also been treated as its own species.

== Growth and development ==
Joshua trees grow quickly for a desert species; new seedlings may grow at an average rate of 7.6 cm (3.0 in) per year in their first 10 years, then only about 3.8 cm (1.5 in) per year. The trunk is light, fibrous and lacks annual growth rings, making determining a tree's age difficult. This tree has a top-heavy branch system, and a broad root system, with roots in one case found 11 m (36 ft) from the nearest Joshua tree. If it survives the rigors of the desert, it can live for several hundred years. New plants can grow from seed, but in some populations, new stems grow from underground rhizomes that spread out around the parent tree.

The tallest trees reach about 15 m (49 ft).

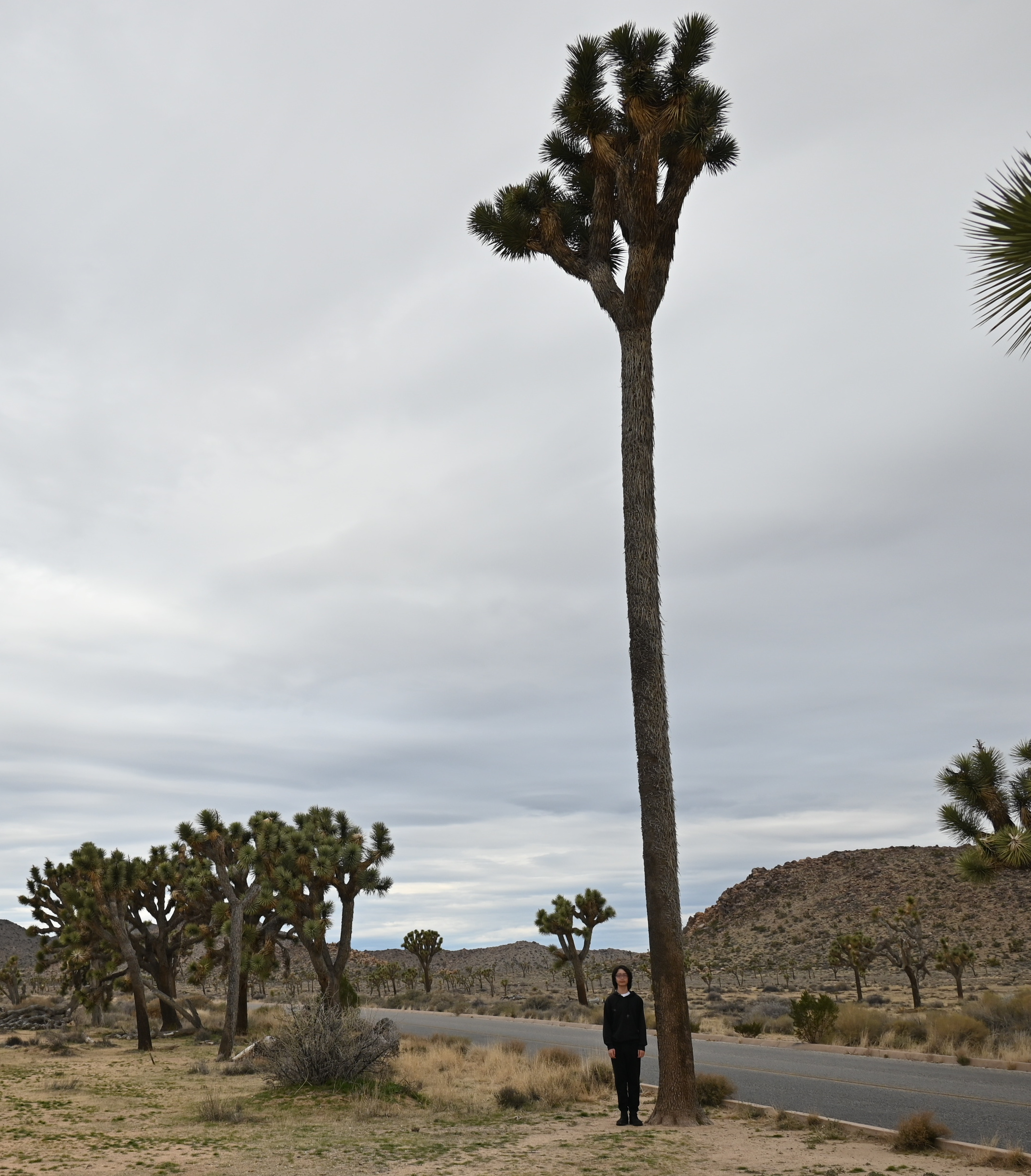
A tree about 45 ft. tall

The evergreen leaves are dark green, linear, bayonet-shaped, 15 to 35 cm long, and 7 to 15 mm broad at the base, tapering to a sharp point; they are borne in a dense spiral arrangement at the apex of the stems. The leaf margins are white and serrated.

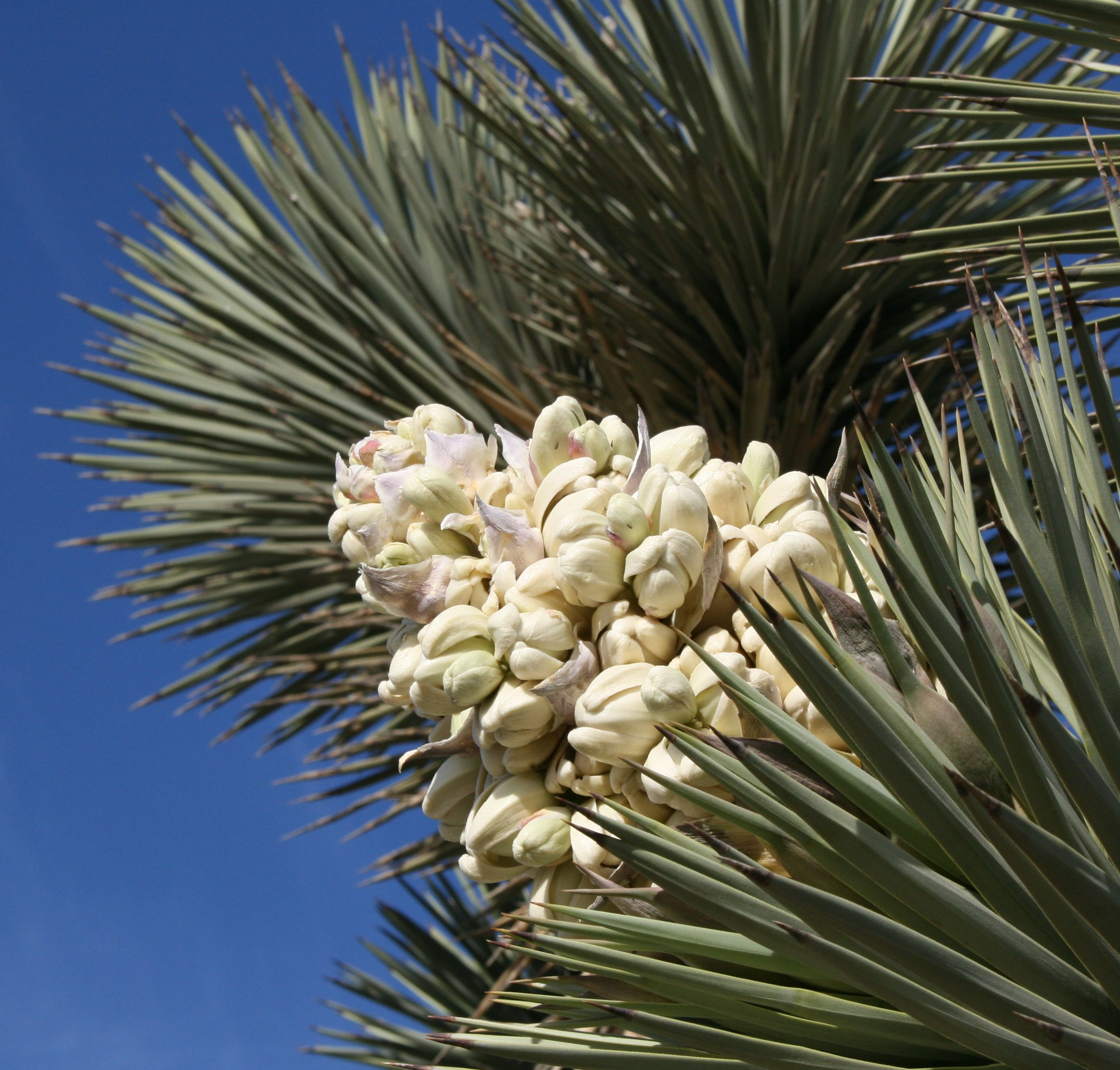
Flowers grow in panicles

Flowers typically appear from February to late April, in panicles 30 to 55 cm tall and 30 to 38 cm broad, the individual flowers erect, 4 to 7 cm tall, with six creamy white to green tepals. The tepals are lanceolate and are fused to the middle. The fused pistils are 3 cm tall, and the stigma cavity is surrounded by lobes. The semi-fleshy fruit that is produced is green-brown, elliptical, and contains many flat seeds. Joshua trees usually do not branch until after they bloom (though branching may also occur if the growing tip is destroyed by the yucca-boring weevil), and they do not bloom every year. Like most desert plants, their blooming depends on rainfall at the proper time. They also need a winter freeze before they bloom.

Once they bloom, the flowers are pollinated by the yucca moth (Tegeticula synthetica), which spreads pollen while laying eggs inside the flower. The larvae feed on the seeds, but enough seeds remain to reproduce. The Joshua tree is also able to actively abort ovaries in which too many eggs have been produced.

== Distribution and habitat ==
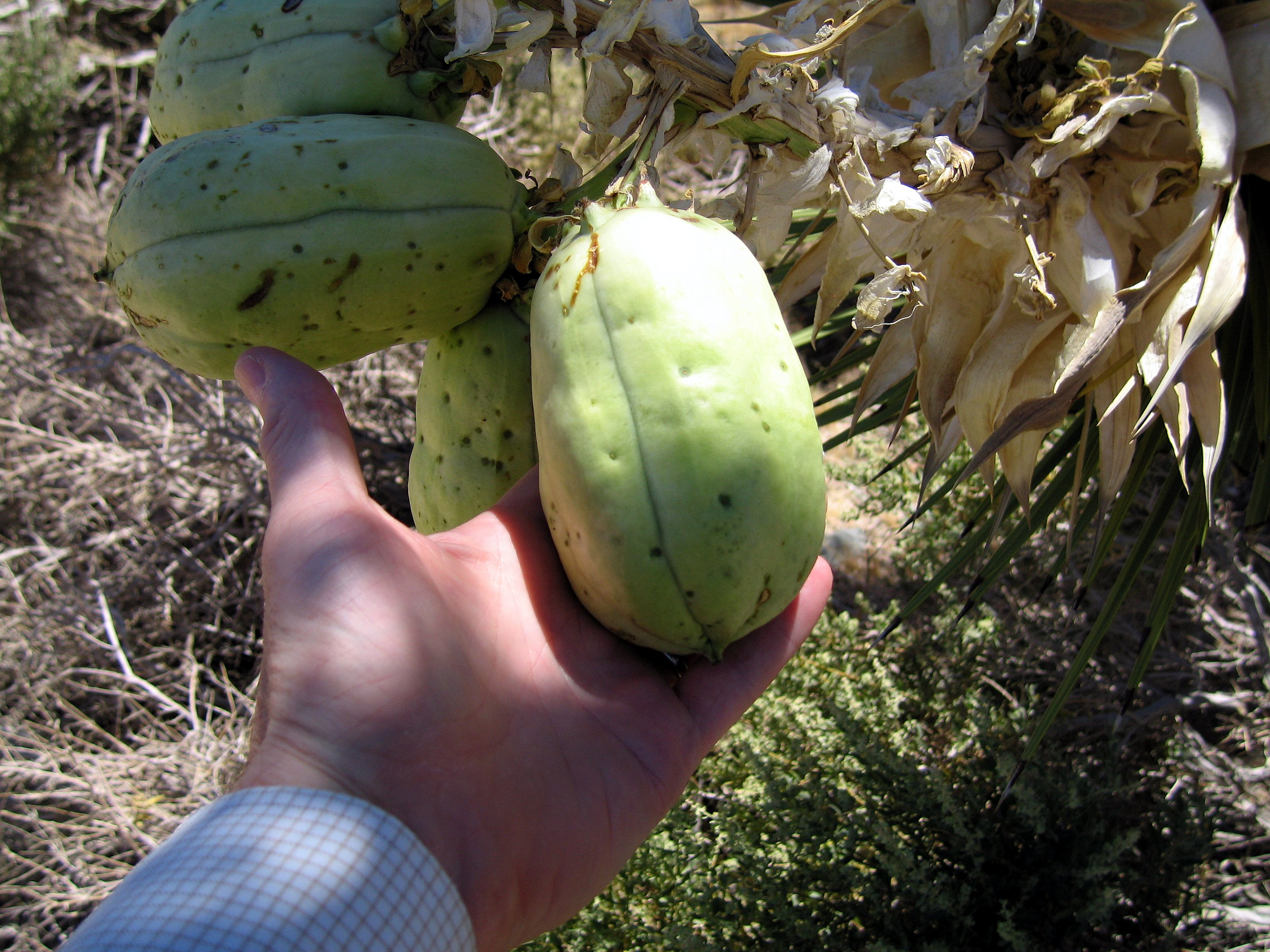
Fruit

The Joshua tree is native to the southwestern United States (Arizona, California, Nevada, and Utah) and northwestern Mexico. This range mostly coincides with the geographical reach of the Mojave Desert, where it is considered one of the major indicator species for the desert. It occurs at elevations between 400 and 1,800 m (1,300 and 5,900 ft).

=== Conservation status ===
External videos
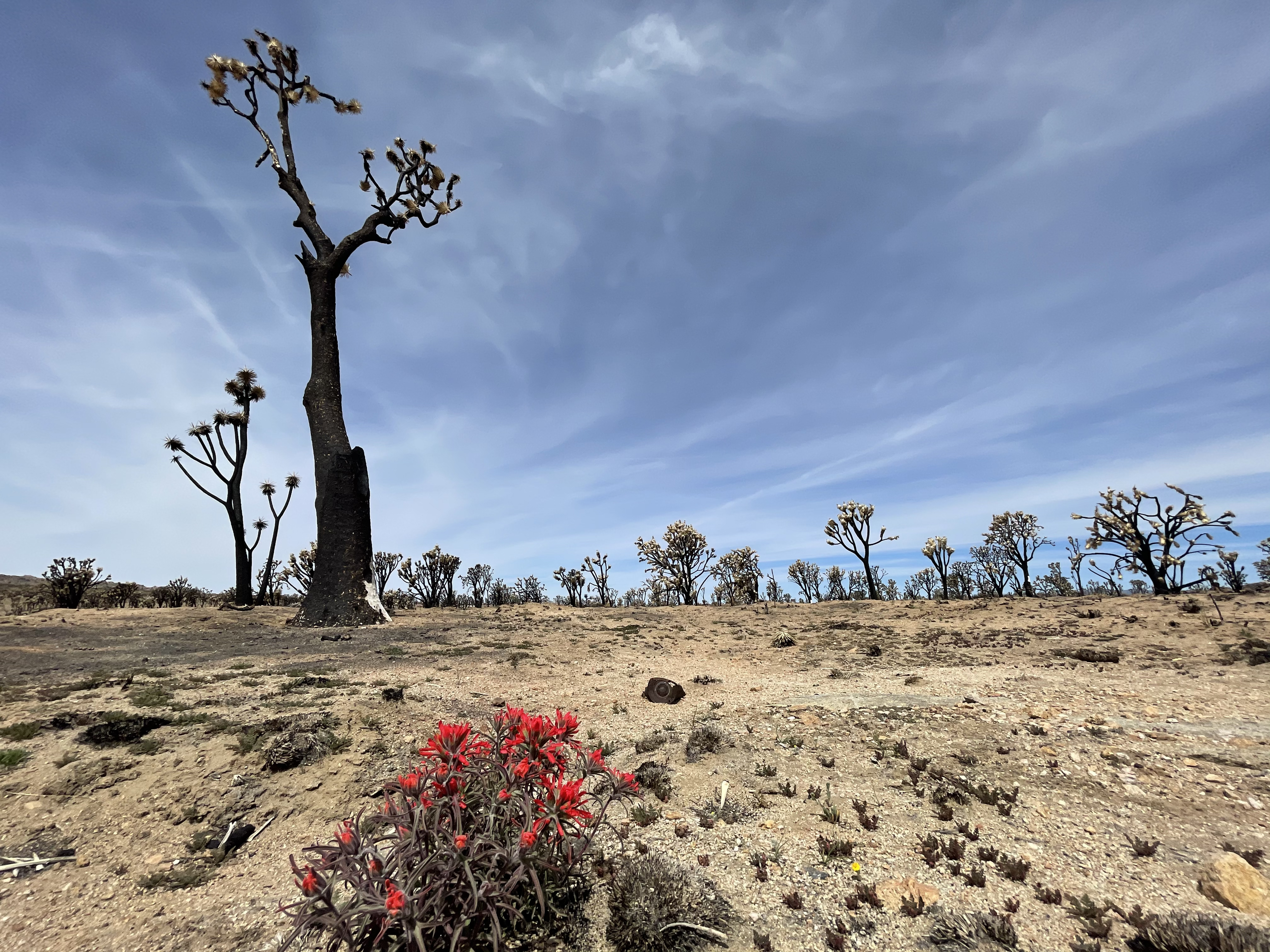
- "Can a fire-ravaged forest of Joshua trees be restored?", Tien Nguyen, Knowable Magazine, March 4, 2022.

Joshua trees are one of the species predicted to have their range reduced and shifted by climate change. Concern remains that they will be eliminated from Joshua Tree National Park, with ecological research suggesting a high probability that their populations will be reduced by 90% of their current range by the end of the 21st century, thus fundamentally transforming the ecosystem of the park. Wildfires, invasive grasses, and poor migration patterns for the trees' seeds are all additional factors in the species' imperilment. As an example, approximately 13%—or more than 1.3 million Joshua trees—in one of the densest Joshua tree populations in the world in Mojave National Preserve were killed in the Dome Fire in August 2020. Also, concern exists about the ability of the species to migrate to favorable climates due to the extinction of the giant Shasta ground sloth (Nothrotheriops shastensis) 13,000 years ago; ground sloth dung has been found to contain Joshua tree leaves, fruits, and seeds, suggesting that the sloths might have been key to the trees' dispersal. However, ground squirrels are very effective at moving the seeds long distances.

In March 2022, California Department of Fish and Wildlife conducted a status review of the Western Joshua Tree to determine whether to list the species as threatened under the California Endangered Species Act (CESA). The study showed that the largest threat to Yucca brevifolia was wildfires, that wildfires were a threat to population density of prone areas but not to the limits of the range itself, that several population studies showed Yucca brevifolia was abundant, and that although the southern region of the species' range has been reduced, the trend is that the northern region has been expanding over the last 11,700 years as the North American ice cap melted, allowing the species to occupy its current range. The studies showing reduced population after fires used aerial photography to document populations, which would underreport smaller and thus younger trees, as was noted in the review. The review concluded:

Based on the criteria described above, the best scientific information available to the Department at this time indicates that western Joshua tree is not in danger of becoming extinct throughout all, or a significant portion, of its range due to one or more causes, including loss of habitat, change in habitat, overexploitation, predation, competition, or disease, and is not likely to become an endangered species in the foreseeable future in the absence of special protection and management efforts required by CESA.

In February 2023, California Governor Gavin Newsom's administration proposed a budget trailer bill, the Western Joshua Tree Conservation Act, to focus on protecting the climate-threatened species and permitting development in the Southern California desert. The legislation requires conservation plans for this and other species that may be threatened by climate change, and would authorize the California Department of Fish and Wildlife to permit taking a western Joshua tree only under certain conditions. The legislation requires a fee of up to $2500 for the removal, relocation or trimming of limbs of a Western Joshua tree, including dead trees and limbs.

This bill was passed by California lawmakers in June 2023 and went into effect on July 10, 2023.

== Uses and cultivation ==
Different forms of the species are cultivated, including smaller plants native to the eastern part of the species's range. These smaller plants grow 2.5 meters (8 ft 2 in) tall and branch when about one meter (3 ft 3 in) tall. Red-shafted flickers make nests in the branches, which are later used by other birds. Despite being from a desert environment they can withstand temperatures as low as −18 °C (0 °F). They have also been planted in Denver, Colorado, suggesting they may be able to tolerate occasional temperatures as cold as −23 °C (−9 °F).

Before the twentieth century, Native Americans of the Mojave and western Sonoran Desert routinely used several parts of the Joshua tree as food and fiber. Leaf fibers were occasionally used to bind and manufacture sandals. Root sheaths were woven into baskets to add reddish-brown designs. Fruits were baked or boiled, then eaten. Seeds were ground into flour and mixed with flour from other plant species. The flour was moistened with water, and the resulting paste was kneaded into cakes and dried.
