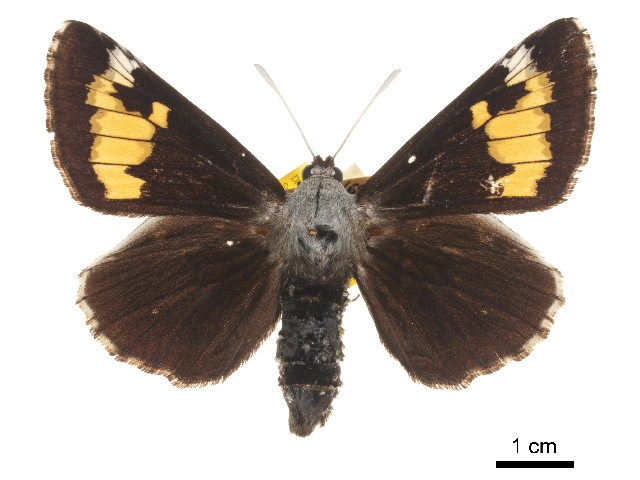

Scientific classification
- Kingdom: Animalia
- Phylum: Arthropoda
- Class: Insecta
- Order: Lepidoptera
- Family: Hesperiidae
- Genus: Megathymus
- Species: M. ursus

Binomial name
- Megathymus ursus Poling, 1902

= Megathymus ursus =

Species of butterfly

Megathymus ursus, known generally as the ursus giant skipper or ursine giant skipper, is a species of giant skipper in the butterfly family Hesperiidae. It is found in Central America and North America.

The MONA or Hodges number for Megathymus ursus is 4151.

== Subspecies ==
These three subspecies belong to the species Megathymus ursus:

- Megathymus ursus deserti R. Wielgus, J. Wielgus & D. Wielgus, 1972
- Megathymus ursus ursus Poling, 1902
- Megathymus ursus violae D. Stallings & Turner, 1956
