= Tegeticula intermedia =

Scientific classification
- Kingdom: Animalia
- Phylum: Arthropoda
- Clade: Pancrustacea
- Class: Insecta
- Order: Lepidoptera
- Family: Prodoxidae
- Genus: Tegeticula
- Species: T. intermedia

Binomial name
- Tegeticula intermedia (Riley, 1881)

Synonyms
- Prodoxus intermedia Riley, 1881

Species of moth

Tegeticula intermedia is a moth of the family Prodoxidae. Along with other moth species, it is commonly known as a yucca moth. T. intermedia lives in North America, particularly the United States. The moth resides in the southwest, the Great Plains, the Southeast, and mid-Atlantic. It also has been found much farther north in regions of Canada like Ontario and Alberta. There are also notable populations present in New Mexico. Their habitats are diverse and vary in terms of climate, landscape, and other factors. The moth lives in sand dunes, forests (pine, pinyon, oak), glades, grassland, desert, and forests from the East Coast to the Southwest. Yucca moths have developed a strong mutualism with the yucca plant, such that both depend on each other for survival. The yucca moths and yucca plants have coevolved over millions of years. However, Tegeticula intermedia differs from most yucca moths in that it exhibits cheating behavior by laying eggs without pollinating the yucca plant.

== Geographic range ==
T. intermedia primarily lives within the United States in the Southwest and Great Plains. However, it also has managed to maintain populations in the Southeast, including Florida, Georgia, and Virginia. It has additionally been found in Ontario and Alberta, Canada.

The latest research suggests that T. intermedia originated from the Southwestern region of the United States, approximately located in present New Mexico. It then followed the yucca plant as it propagated eastward and into the south, particularly in Florida. The sister species to T. intermedia, Tegeticula cassandra, also exhibits cheating behavior in pollination and is restricted to the Southeastern United States. This led some scientists to believe that T. intermedia originated from this region, known as the "out-of-Florida hypothesis." However, recent mtDNA analysis suggests that the species did in fact originate in the West.

== Habitat ==
Yucca moths such as T. intermedia tend to live where their partner yucca plants do. T. intermedia has been found to reside in a diverse array of environments including shrub deserts, coastal dunes, prairies, forests (pine and oak), and glades. This moth has an approximate vertical distribution from 0-1400m.

== Food resources ==
=== Caterpillar ===
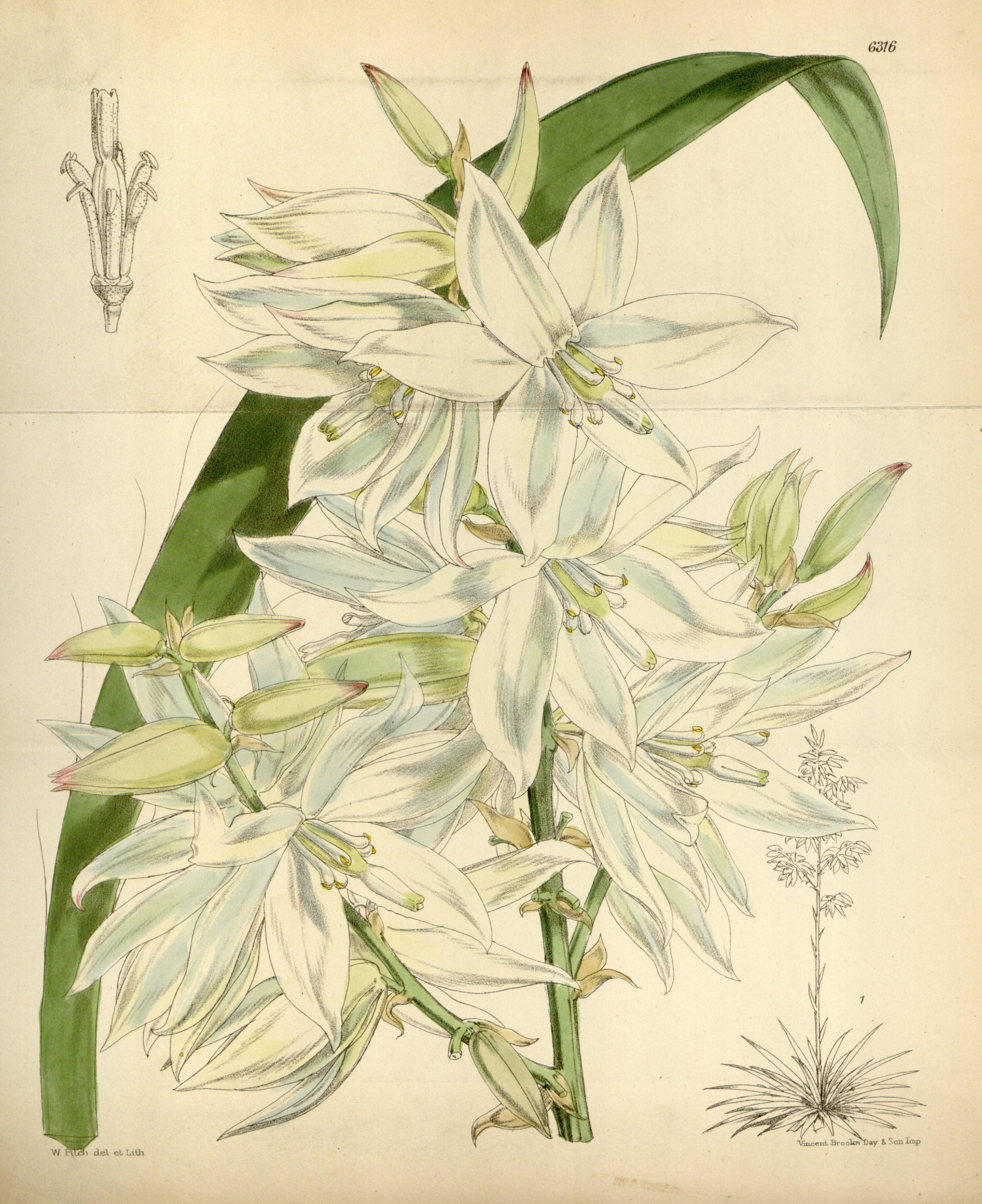
Yucca flaccida (as Yucca orchioides var. major) Bot. Mag. 103. tab. 6316. 1877

Larvae feed on a variety of plants within the yucca genus, depending on the region of the population. Some host species include Yucca filamentosa, Y. arkansana, and Y. flaccida.

Larvae feed on yucca seeds within the fruit. Since there is an abundance of seeds within the fruit, the larva does not impinge too heavily upon the health of the yucca plant or compete too strongly with other pollinator species of yucca moths. These seeds are the only known food source to the yucca moth larvae. The larvae of T. intermedia superficially crawl towards the ovary so they can burrow past the wall and commence feeding upon the developing seeds. They then escape from the flower, falling to the ground to burrow and cocoon.

=== Adult ===
Adults have such short lifespans that they do not need to eat to achieve their reproductive goals. Although they do have mouth parts or tentacles, these are used for collecting pollen than for feeding.

== Parental care ==
=== Host plant selection for egg laying ===
The host yucca plant regulates the number of eggs laid by selectively abscessing flowers that are overburdened with eggs. The plant selects which flowers to abscess by assessing its weight due to the excess of eggs and by recognizing severe ovule damage due to excessive oviposition. In T. intermedia, the moth avoids ovipositing into the ovule directly. Thus, the plant does not perceive ovule damage, and will not abort the flower.

=== Oviposition ===
Although most yucca moths deposit their eggs in the ovule of the flower, Tegeticula employs different methods of laying eggs. T. intermedia employs superficial oviposition, meaning that the yucca moth lays its eggs very slightly beneath the plant tissue, so as not to damage the yucca ovule. This strategy allows the moth to bypass the yucca plant's regulation of the number of eggs it hosts, leading to exploitation of the plant. Oviposition takes place in the fruit of the yucca.

== Life cycle ==
=== Egg ===
Yucca moths' mate in the spring when the yucca flowers are in bloom. They then mate on the yucca flower, usually in the evening when the flower will be open. Then, the female moth will lay eggs in the wall of the fruit of the yucca, typically around 6- to 20-day-old fruits. T. intermedia is unique in that it will superficially oviposit eggs one at a time so as to deceive the yucca plant.

=== Caterpillar ===
Once laid, the larvae will hatch quickly in only a few days' time. During early instars the larvae feed inside the fruit on the developing seeds. Later in their development, the matured instars leave the fruit, preferably after a rainstorm or during wet conditions to make escape easier.

=== Pupa ===
The larvae fall to the ground, burying themselves in a cocoon one to two dozen centimeters below ground during pupation.

=== Adult ===
The adult moths will emerge in the following spring to restart the life cycle.

== Protective behavior ==
T. intermedia is a predominantly white colored insect. Mild color variation occurs in different regions. The white color allows the moth to blend in with the yucca flower, camouflaging it from predators.

== Genetic hybridization ==
Hybridization is when two different species or genetically different varieties of the same species are able to breed and produce offspring together. The offspring may have limited reproductive capability. T. intermedia has successfully been able to mate with a similar moth, Tegeticula cassandra. Both have incredibly similar superficial ovipositor and aedeagus physiology. However, T. intermedia has not been found to have hybridized with any species with a locule ovipositor. Research suggests that it is thus the similarity in ovipositor that allows two different species to hybridize.

== Physiology ==
T. intermedia has a modest wingspan of around 25 mm. The fore wings can occasionally have a slight tan color, but the body of the moth is predominately white. The hind wings are a soft, light grey and brown color. These moths tend to be lighter in more southern populations. Female moths have special tentacles as mouth parts (although it does not eat as an adult) which it uses to scrape pollen from a yucca anther into a relatively large, sticky ball that can be as big as 10% of her body mass.

=== Olfaction ===
Female yucca moths use their antennae to sense if a flower has already been visited, and presumably oviposited on, by another female by detecting trace pheromones left behind. If detected, the female leaves and finds another flower that hopefully has not been pollinated yet.

== Parasitism ==
=== With plants ===
Yucca moths get their name for the intense, obligate mutualism they share with the yucca genus that has evolved over millions of years. The yucca moth is the only insect capable of pollinating the yucca plant. Likewise, the yucca plant is the only biological resource that sustains the moth. Both are so deeply interdependent on each other for survival that in most cases one local population extinction event of either the plant or moth would lead to an extinction of the complementary species.

However, Tegeticula intermedia is a cheater species of yucca moth that parasitizes the yucca plant. It has evolved to superficially oviposit to avoid detection by the yucca that would allow it to lay many eggs without inducing flower abortion. The key trait of this species is that it lays eggs without pollinating the yucca. It enjoys the benefits of reproducing without the costs of aiding yucca reproduction at the expense of the host.
