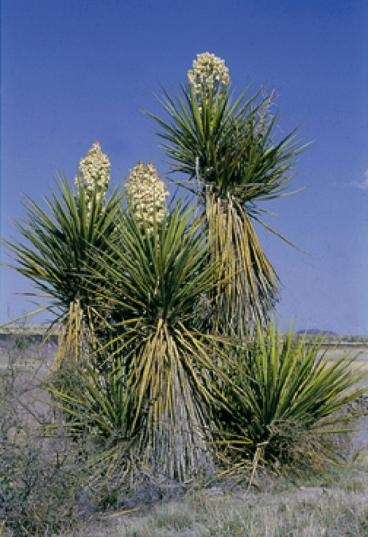

Conservation status
- Least Concern (IUCN 3.1)

- Apparently Secure (NatureServe)

Scientific classification
- Kingdom: Plantae
- Clade: Embryophytes
- Clade: Tracheophytes
- Clade: Spermatophytes
- Clade: Angiosperms
- Clade: Monocots
- Order: Asparagales
- Family: Asparagaceae
- Subfamily: Agavoideae
- Genus: Yucca
- Species: Y. torreyi

Binomial name
- Yucca torreyi Shafer

Synonyms
- Yucca baccata var. macrocarpa Torr.

= Yucca torreyi =

Species of flowering plant

Yucca torreyi, commonly known as Torrey's yucca, is a large species of Yucca native to the Chihuahuan Desert that can reach a height of 20 ft (6.1 m), but more commonly 3–10 ft (0.9–3.0 m).

This species was named for John Torrey, the Columbia University botanist, who designated this yucca as a new variety in 1859.

== Taxonomy ==
Ayala-Hernandez et al. analyzed genetic data in 2025 and found Yucca torreyi and the often-confused Yucca treculiana to not only be distinct species, but of different lineages. Y. torreyi was found to be more closely related to Y. filifera, Y. potosina, Y. decipiens, and Y. queretaroensis than it is to Y. treculiana.

== Description ==
Yucca torreyi grows up to 20 feet tall, but more commonly reaches 3-10 feet. The trunk is often branched, but sometimes has a single stem. The flower head may extend to 2 feet on the upper portion of the stem. The flowers are bell-shaped, 2-3 inches long, creamy-white or tinged with purple, waxy, with 6 tepals, 6 stamens, and 1 pistil which is 1-1 1/2 inches long. Leaves are 2-4 1/2 feet long, straight and rigid, ending in a sharp spine 1 1/2-2 inches long, they radiate around the stem.

== Distribution ==
Yucca torreyi is native to the Chihuahuan Desert and occurs widespread across much of the region. In the United States it occurs from south-central to southeastern New Mexico to Trans-Pecos Texas to central Texas, being most numerous in the Trans-Pecos. In Mexico it occurs in eastern Chihuahua, Coahuila, far eastern Durango, and western Nuevo Leon.

== Uses ==
Native Americans ate the pulpy fruits of this and related shrubby species either raw or roasted; they also dried and ground them into meal for winter use. The coarse fibers of the long leaves were made into ropes, mats, sandals, baskets, and cloth.
