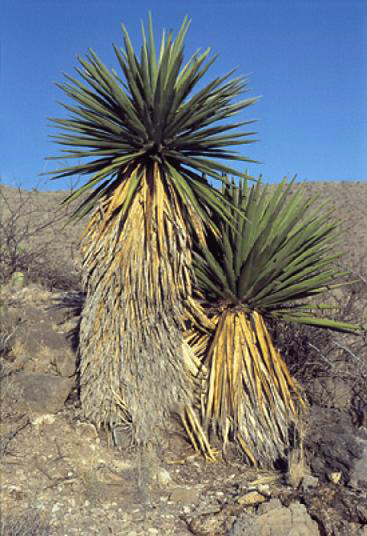

Conservation status
- Least Concern (IUCN 3.1)

Scientific classification
- Kingdom: Plantae
- Clade: Embryophytes
- Clade: Tracheophytes
- Clade: Spermatophytes
- Clade: Angiosperms
- Clade: Monocots
- Order: Asparagales
- Family: Asparagaceae
- Subfamily: Agavoideae
- Genus: Yucca
- Species: Y. faxoniana

Binomial name
- Yucca faxoniana Sarg.

Synonyms
- Samuela faxoniana (Trel).; Yucca australis (Trel.)

= Yucca faxoniana =

Species of shrub

Yucca faxoniana is a small evergreen tree in the genus Yucca with 1 or sometimes more trunks, enlarged at base and either unbranched or with 1 or 2 upright branches and with long bayonetlike leaves. It is known by the common names Faxon yucca, Spanish dagger, and giant dagger.

It is named for Charles Edward Faxon (1846-1918), the illustrator of Charles Sprague Sargent's 14-volume Silva of North America. Birds and mammals eat the fleshy fruit.

The flowers are pollinated by moths of the genus Tegeticula and bloom typically in April. The plant produces sweet, pulpy, oblong fruits.

== Description ==
Plants solitary, erect, arborescent, 2.5–6.9 m, including inflorescence. Stems 1, simple or with 2–4 branches, to 5.1 m, average diam. 32 cm. Leaf blade erect, yellowish green, 43–115 × 3.1–8.4 cm, rigid, smooth, glabrous, margins conspicuous, curling, filiferous, brown. Inflorescences erect, paniculate, often with proximal branches arising beyond rosettes, broadly ovoid, 5.5–25.5 dm, glabrous; peduncle 0.3–0.6 m. Flowers pendent, 4.4–12.4 cm; perianth campanulate; tepals connate basally into floral cup 1–32 mm, white to greenish white, ovate, 3.9–10.8 cm; filaments averaging 2.2 cm from base of tepals, glabrous; anthers 1–6 mm; pistil 2.8–8 × 0.7 cm; ovary ca. 4.5–5 times longer than wide; style 4.5 mm; stigmas distinct. Fruits pendent, baccate, indehiscent, elongate, 3.6–13.6 × 1.8–3.6 cm, fleshy, succulent. Seeds black, 7.7 mm diam., 2.9 mm thick, smooth.

Phenology: Flowering late winter–spring. Habitat: Rocky slopes, flat plains Elevation: 800–2100 m.

== Taxonomy ==
Trelease described the genus Samuela based on two species, Samuela faxoniana (now Yucca faxoniana) and S. carnerosana (now Yucca carnerosana).

Ayala-Hernandez et al. analyzed genetic data in 2025 and found Y. faxoniana and Y. carnerosana to not only be distinct species, but of different lineages and not closely related to each other.

== Distribution ==
Yucca faxoniana is native to the northwestern Chihuahuan Desert region of northern Mexico, southern New Mexico, and Trans-Pecos Texas. Its range is centered around Big Bend National Park. In Mexico it occurs in eastern Chihuahua and in Coahuila.

== Uses ==
Native Americans used the fruit as a food source—raw, roasted, dried, and ground into meals. They also used the plant leaves as a fiber in basketry, cloth, mats, ropes, and sandals.
