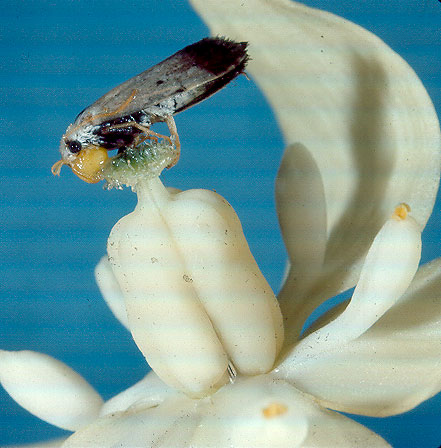

Scientific classification
- Kingdom: Animalia
- Phylum: Arthropoda
- Clade: Pancrustacea
- Class: Insecta
- Order: Lepidoptera
- Family: Prodoxidae
- Genus: Tegeticula; Zeller, 1873

Synonyms
- Pronuba Riley 1872 (non Thomson, 1860: preoccupied); Thelethia Dyar, 1893; Thia H.Edwards, 1888 (non Leach, 1815: preoccupied); Valentinia Coolidge 1909 (non Walsingham, 1907: preoccupied)

= Tegeticula =

Genus of moths

Tegeticula is a genus of moths of the family Prodoxidae, one of three genera known as yucca moths; they are mutualistic pollinators of various Yucca and Hesperoyucca species.

== Species ==
- Tegeticula altiplanella
- Tegeticula antithetica
- Tegeticula baccatella
- Tegeticula baja
- Tegeticula californica
- Tegeticula carnerosanella
- Tegeticula cassandra
- Tegeticula corruptrix
- Tegeticula elatella
- Tegeticula intermedia
- Tegeticula maculata
- Tegeticula maderae
- Tegeticula mexicana (syn: Tegeticula treculeanella)
- Tegeticula mojavella
- Tegeticula rostratella
- Tegeticula superficiella
- Tegeticula synthetica (syn: Tegeticula paradoxa)
- Tegeticula tambasi
- Tegeticula tehuacana
- Tegeticula yuccasella
