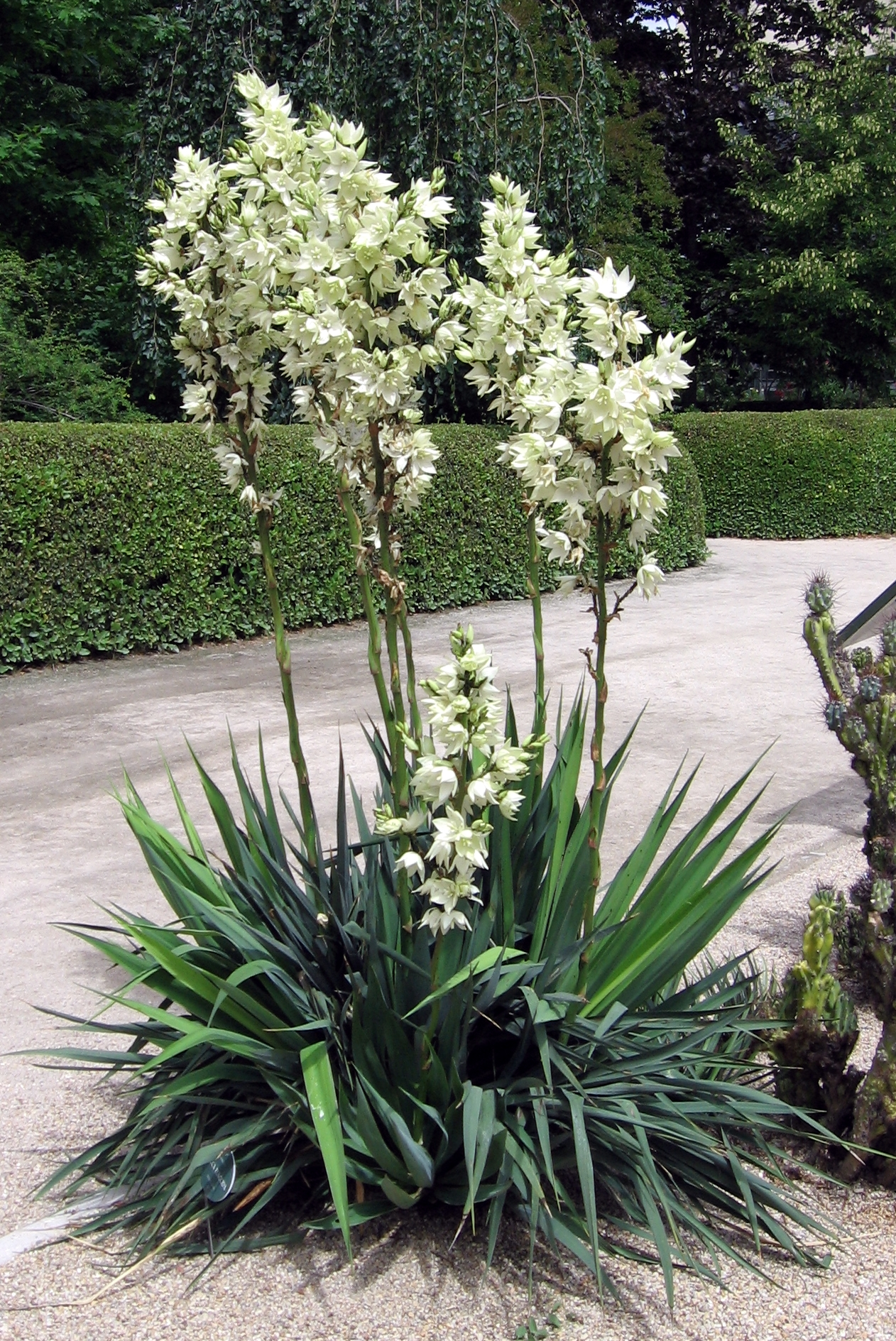
- Royal Botanic Garden, Madrid

Conservation status
- Least Concern (IUCN 3.1)

Scientific classification
- Kingdom: Plantae
- Clade: Tracheophytes
- Clade: Angiosperms
- Clade: Monocots
- Order: Asparagales
- Family: Asparagaceae
- Subfamily: Agavoideae
- Genus: Yucca
- Species: Y. flaccida

Binomial name
- Yucca flaccida Haw.

Synonyms
- Yucca filamentosa var. flaccida (Haw.) Engelm.; Yucca concava Haw.; Yucca exigua Baker; Yucca glaucescens Haw.; Yucca puberula Haw.; Yucca orchioides Carrière; Yucca louisianensis Trel.; Yucca smalliana Fern.; Yucca freemanii Shinners

= Yucca flaccida =

Species of flowering plant

Yucca flaccida, commonly called Adam's needle or weak-leaf yucca, is a species of flowering plant in the asparagus family (Asparagaceae). It is native to south-central and southeastern North America, from the lower Great Plains eastward to the Atlantic seaboard in Virginia, south through Florida and the Gulf states. Its natural habitat is in sandy open woodlands and fields. It is not considered to be threatened by the IUCN.

== Description ==
It is a stemless evergreen shrub growing to 55 cm (22 in) tall by 150 cm (59 in) broad. It has a basal rosette of sharply pointed, swordlike leaves up to 55 cm (22 in) long. In summer, 150 cm (59 in) long panicles of bell-shaped creamy white flowers are held above the foliage.

The Latin specific epithet flaccida means "weak", "feeble", referring to the leaves which often fold under their own weight (the inner leaves may remain erect as they are supported by the outer ones).

== Taxonomy ==
Some authorities regard Y. flaccida as a variety or form of Y. filamentosa, rather than as a separate species.

Populations in the South Central Region of the United States with unusually narrow leaves have been segregated as Y. louisianensis by some authorities. This entity is found in the states of Arkansas, Louisiana, Oklahoma, and Texas.

== Ecology ==
A number of yucca moths lay their eggs upon Y. flaccida as a host plant, an example being Tegeticula intermedia.

== Cultivation ==
It is cultivated and valued as an architectural plant. Numerous cultivars are available, some with variegated leaves, of which 'Golden Sword' and 'Ivory' have gained the Royal Horticultural Society's Award of Garden Merit.

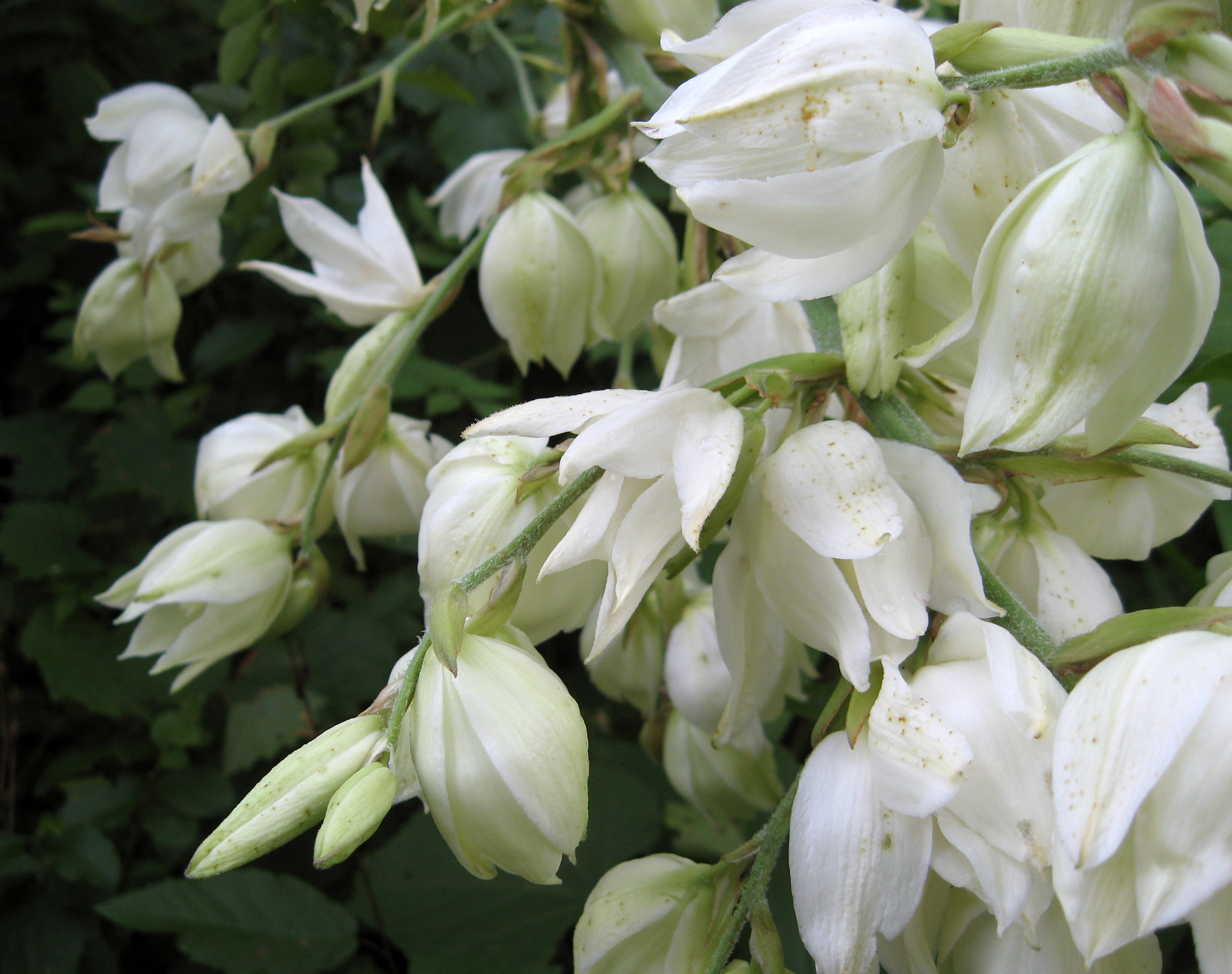
Yucca flaccida can be identified by its pubescent inflorescence branches

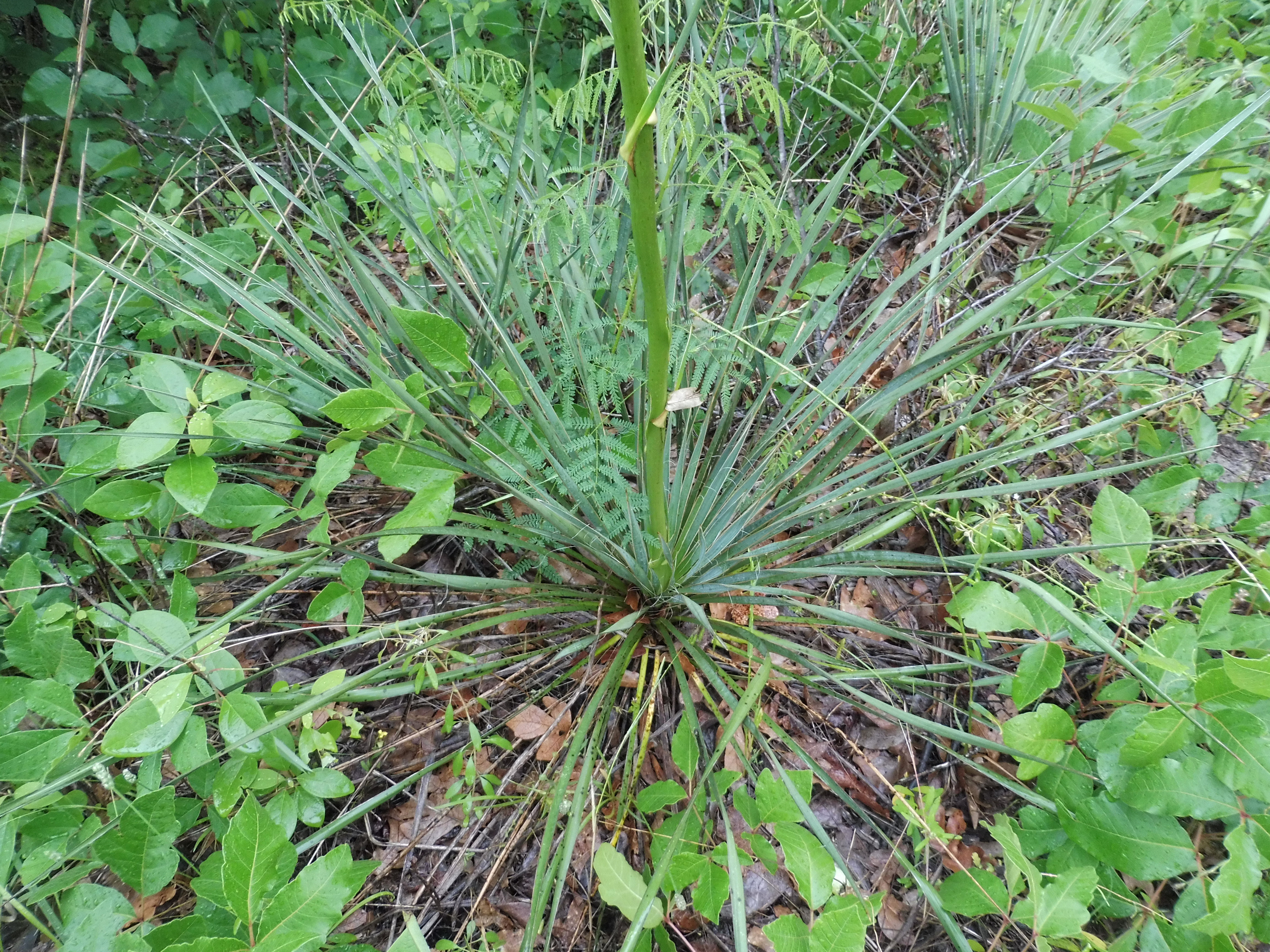
Western populations have unusually narrow leaves, and are sometimes treated as a separate species called Y. louisianensis
