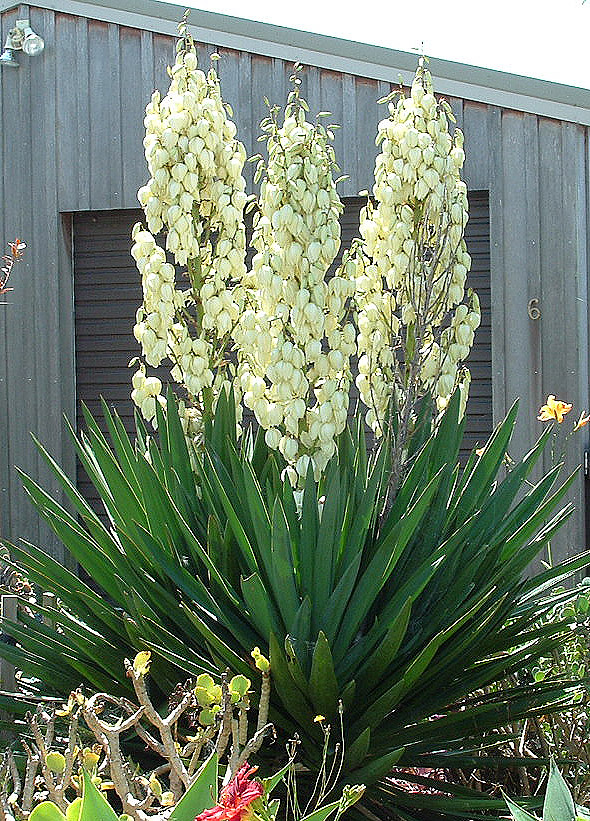

Conservation status
- Least Concern (IUCN 3.1)

- Secure (NatureServe)

Scientific classification
- Kingdom: Plantae
- Clade: Tracheophytes
- Clade: Angiosperms
- Clade: Monocots
- Order: Asparagales
- Family: Asparagaceae
- Subfamily: Agavoideae
- Genus: Yucca
- Species: Y. filamentosa

Binomial name
- Yucca filamentosa L.

= Yucca filamentosa =

Species of flowering plant

Yucca filamentosa, Adam's needle and thread, is a species of flowering plant in the family Asparagaceae native to the southeastern United States. Growing to 3 metres (10 feet) tall, it is an evergreen shrub valued in horticulture.

== Description ==
Usually trunkless, it is multisuckering with heads of 75 centimetres (30 inches) long, filamentous, blue-green, strappy leaves. Y. filamentosa is readily distinguished from other yucca species by white, thready filaments along the leaf margins. Flower stems up to 3 metres (10 feet) tall bear masses of pendulous cream flowers in early summer.

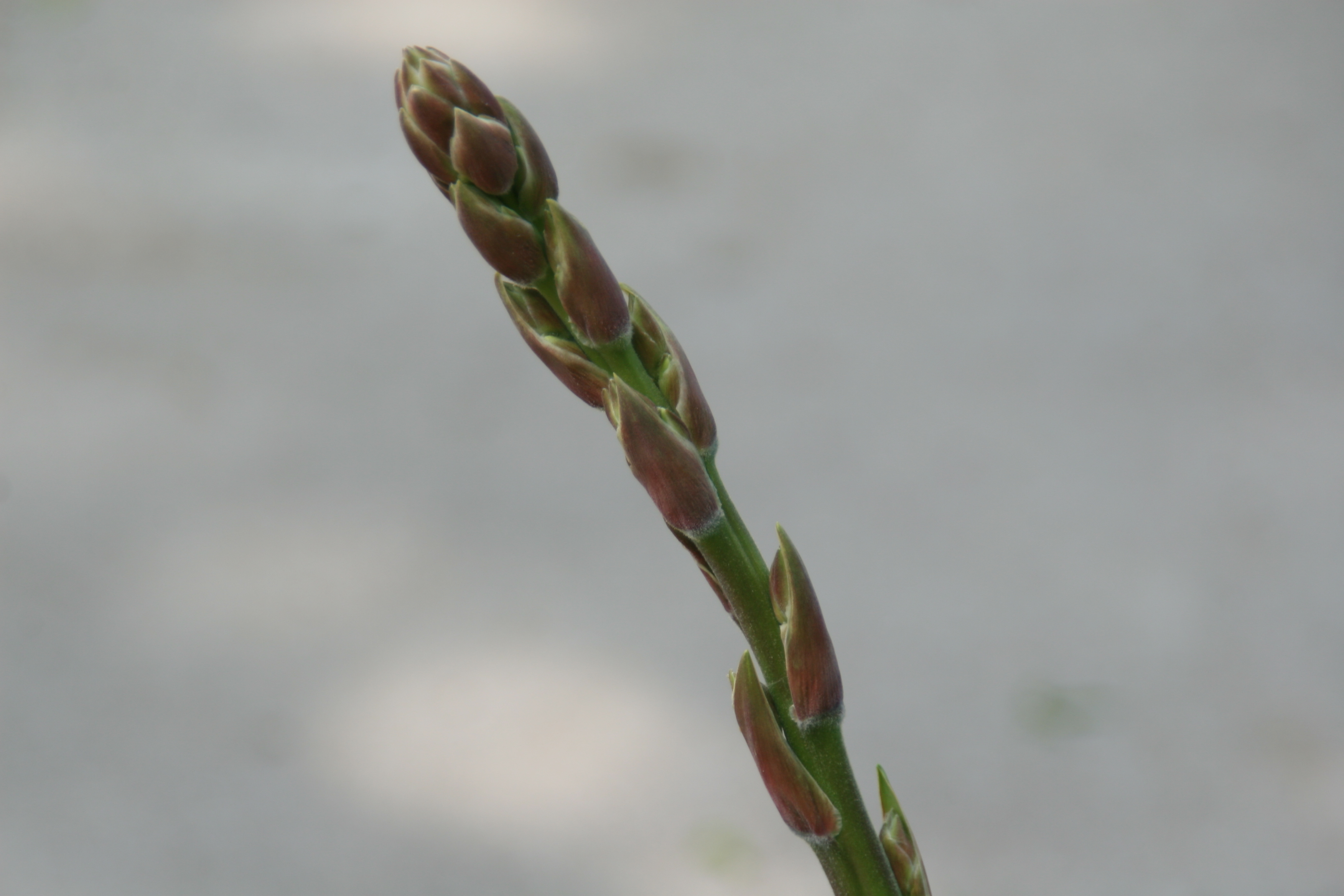
Close-up of buds atop stem

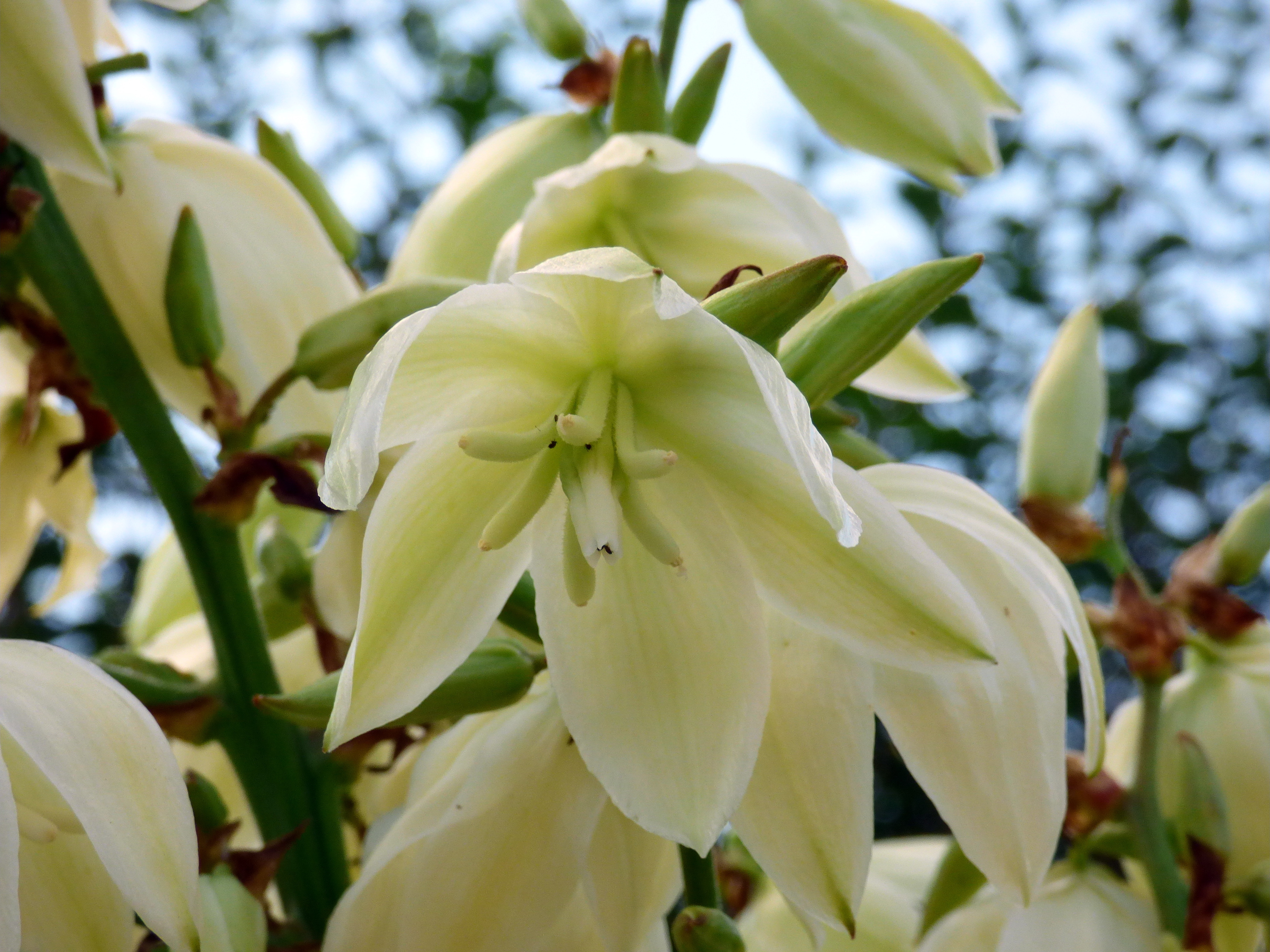
Flower structure (buds in background)

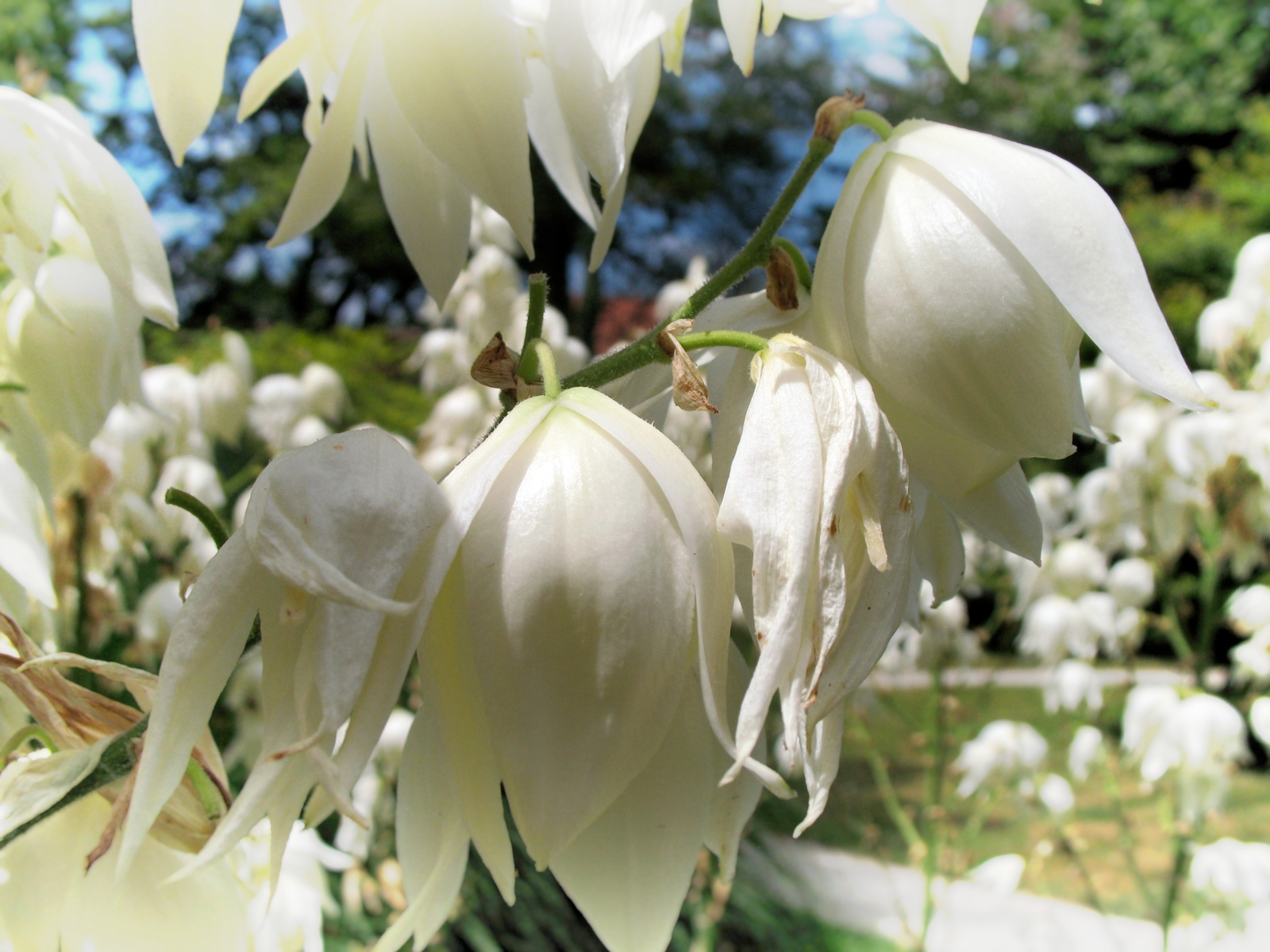
Close-up of hanging flowers

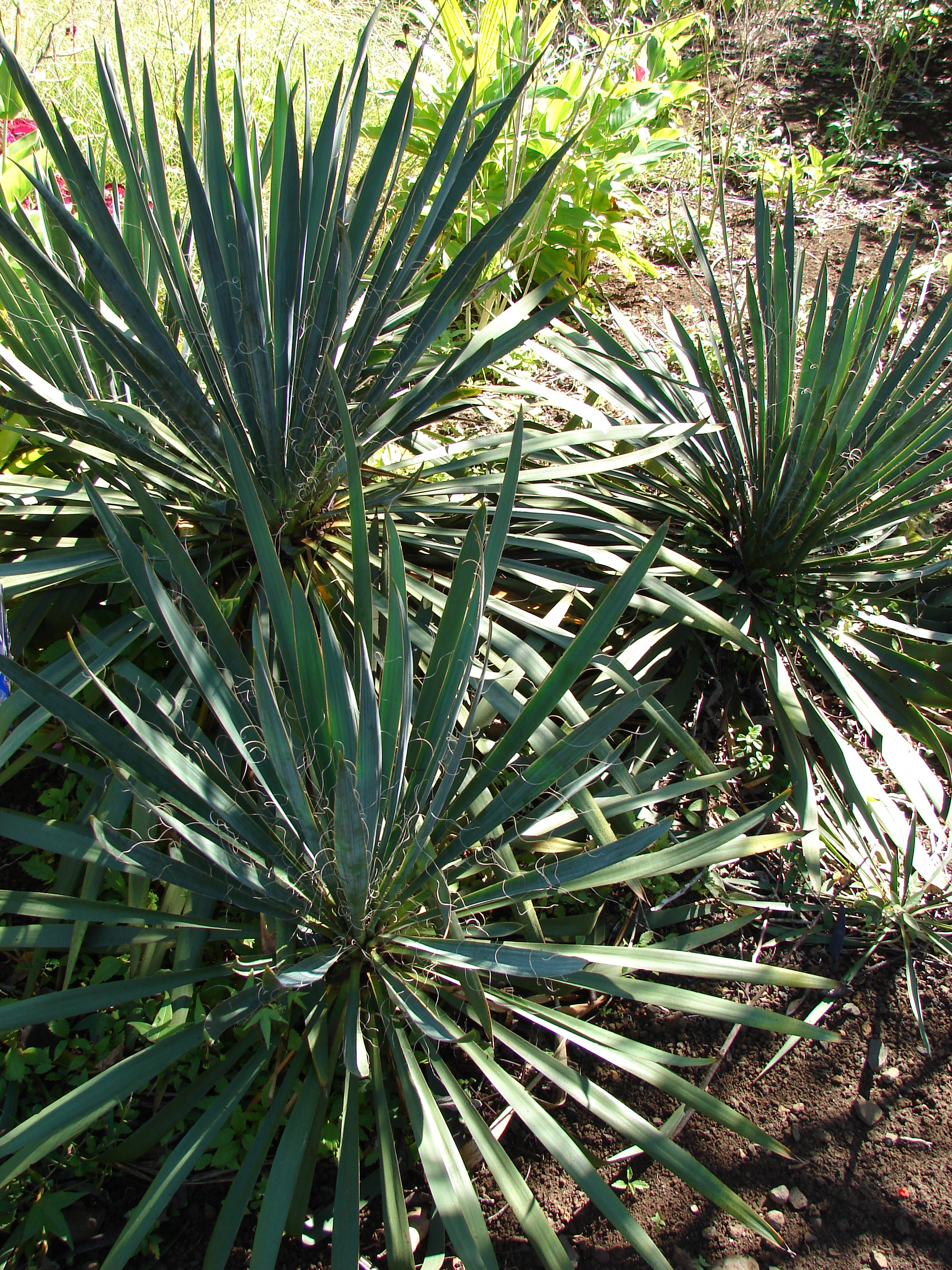
Post-flowering

== Taxonomy ==
Y. filamentosa is closely related to Y. flaccida and it is possible they should be classified as a single species.

=== Names ===
Its common names include Adam's needle, common yucca, Spanish bayonet, bear-grass, needle-palm, silk-grass, and spoon-leaf yucca.

== Distribution and habitat ==
Yucca filamentosa is only native from Maryland south to Florida and westwards to Louisiana. Inland it is native to Tennessee and West Virginia, but is introduced to Kentucky. It has also an introduced plant in New York and Massachusetts and is also reported in France, Germany, Italy, Albania, Hungary, Romania, and Turkey.

In its native environment, Yucca filamentosa is most commonly found in sunny open areas in sandy soils, especially in beach scrub and sand dunes, but also in fields, barrens, and rocky slopes, though it grows well also in silt or clay soils. Normally Yucca filamentosa will spread horizontally across open sunny and dry areas, creating a dense thicket of sword like foliage. Yucca filamentosa is hardy to USDA zone 5 to 12.

== Ecology ==
The plants are pollinated by the yucca moth Tegeticula yuccasella. Other moth species, such as Tegeticula intermedia, also use this yucca as a host plant to lay their eggs.

== Cultivation ==
Y. filamentosa is widely cultivated in mild temperate and subtropical climates. A fairly compact species, it nevertheless presents a striking appearance with its sword-like leaves and dramatic flowerheads. It is naturally a focal point in the landscape, also providing a tropical touch in temperate gardens. It needs full sun and a well-drained soil, preferring an acid or slightly alkaline pH range of 5.5 to 7.5. It develops a large, fleshy, white taproot with deep lateral roots. Once planted and established, it is difficult to remove, as the roots keep sending up new shoots for many years. It is normally hardy down to −29 °C (−20 °F), or U.S. Department of Agriculture (USDA) hardiness zones of 5 to 9: UK H7).

=== Cultivars ===
'Bright Edge', a dwarf cultivar with yellow-margined foliage and creamy flowers tinged with green, has gained the Royal Horticultural Society's Award of Garden Merit. 'Color Guard', with broad yellow stripes all year plus red stripes in the winter, has also won the award.

Other cultivars include:

- 'Golden Sword' - with yellow centered leaves and green margins.
- 'Ivory Tower' - with larger, branched inflorescence.

== Uses ==
Once the seeds have been removed, the fruits can be cooked and eaten. The large flower petals can also be eaten in salads.

The leaves, stems and roots of this plant can be used to stun fish. The Cherokee used it for this purpose.
