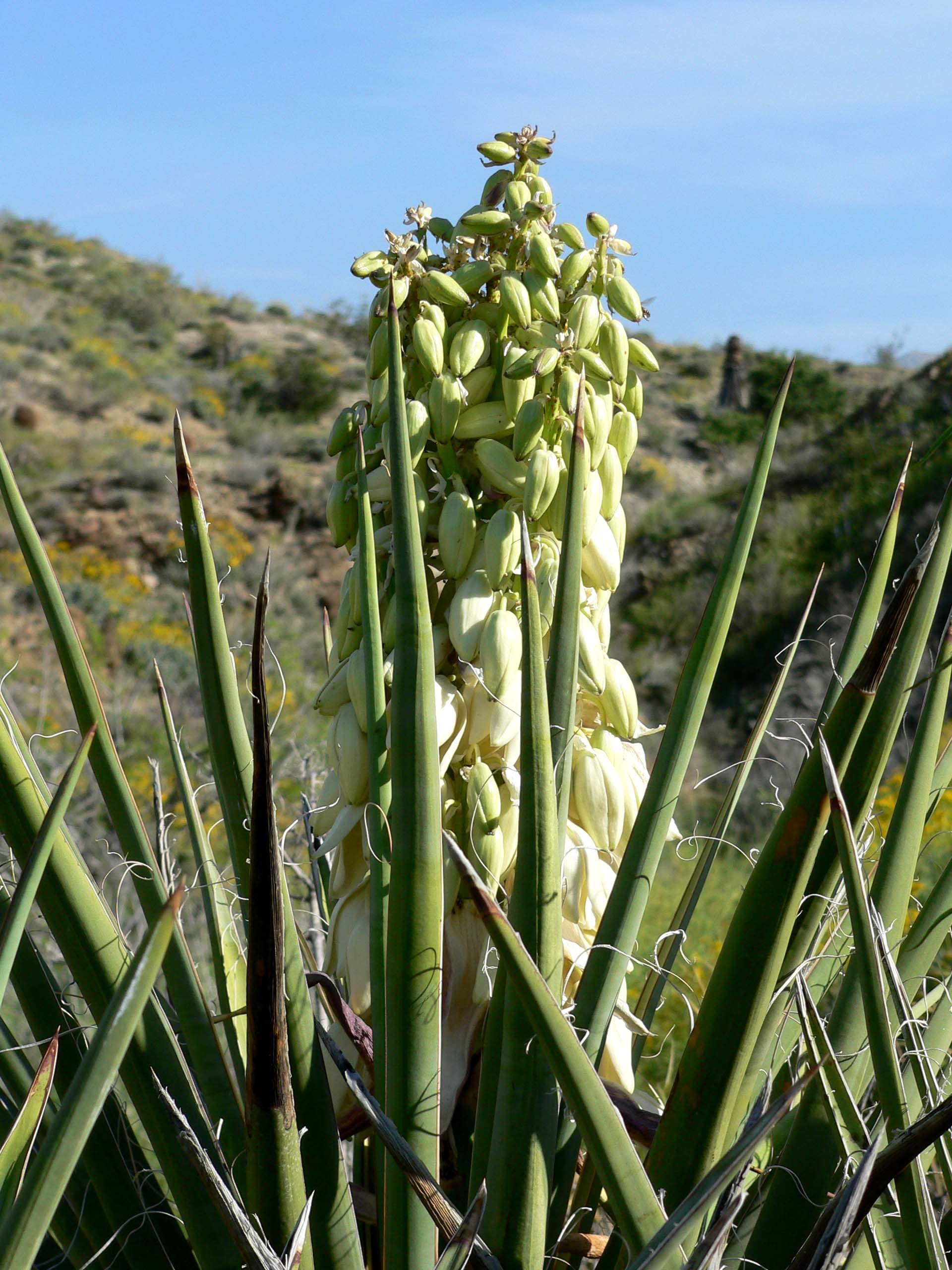
- Flowering plant, Palm Canyon, California

Conservation status
- Least Concern (IUCN 3.1)

Scientific classification
- Kingdom: Plantae
- Clade: Embryophytes
- Clade: Tracheophytes
- Clade: Angiosperms
- Clade: Monocots
- Order: Asparagales
- Family: Asparagaceae
- Subfamily: Agavoideae
- Genus: Yucca
- Species: Y. schidigera

Binomial name
- Yucca schidigera Roezl ex Ortgies

Synonyms
- Yucca californica Nutt. ex Baker; Yucca mohavensis Sarg.; Sarcoyucca mohavensis (Sarg.) Linding.

= Yucca schidigera =

Yucca schidigera Mojave yucca

Species of flowering plant

Yucca schidigera, also known as the Mojave yucca or Spanish dagger, is a perennial plant in the asparagus family Asparagaceae, native to the southwestern United States and northwestern Mexico. It is most common in the Mojave Desert, but also occurs extensively in the Sonoran Desert and west to the Pacific coast of southern California and Baja California.

== Description ==
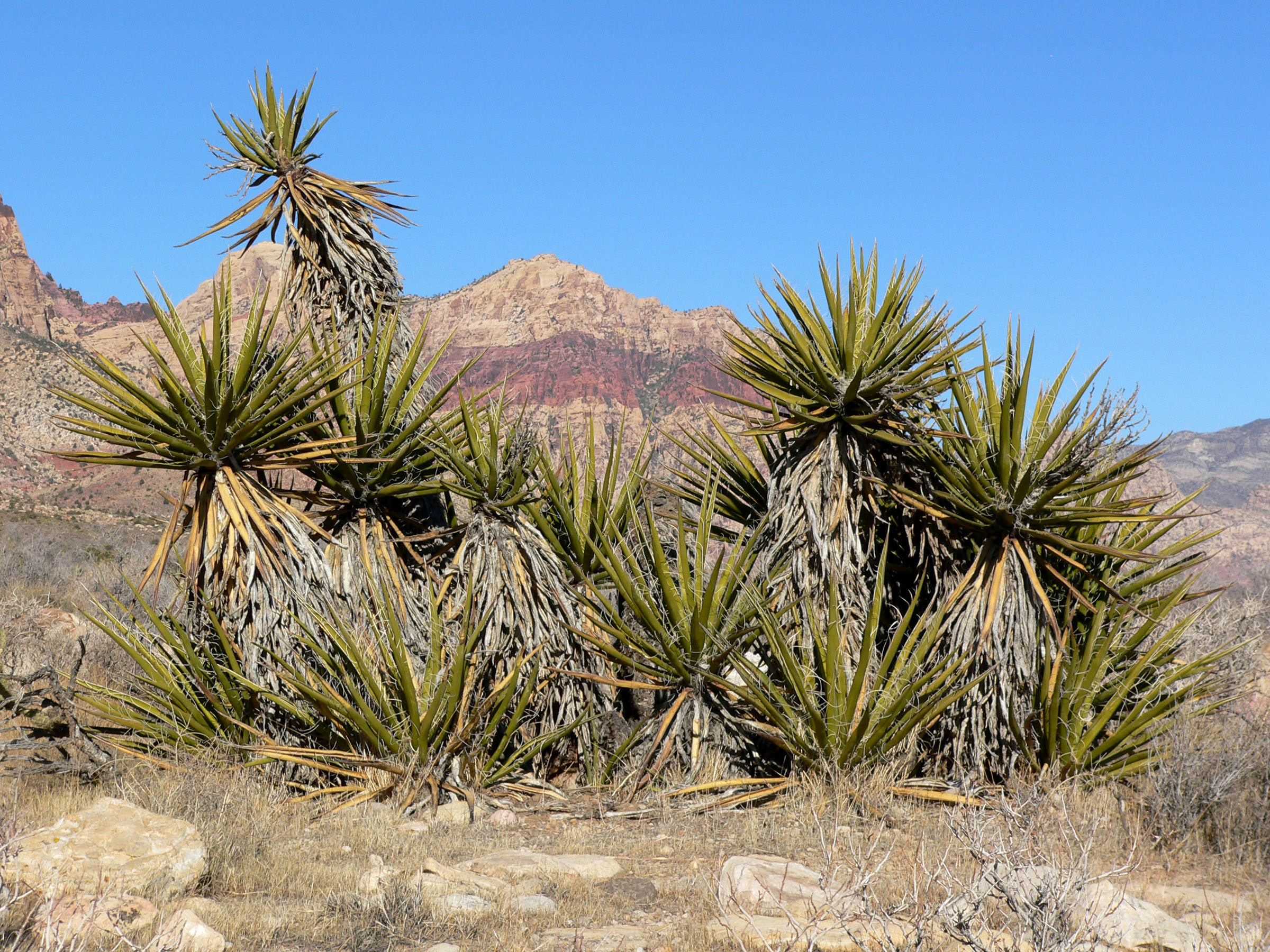

Yucca schidigera is a small evergreen tree growing to 5 metres (16 feet) tall, with a dense crown of spirally arranged bayonet-like leaves on top of a conspicuous basal trunk. The bark is gray-brown, being covered with brown dead leaves near the top, becoming irregularly rough and scaly-to-ridged closer to the ground. The leaves are 30–150 centimetres (12–59 inches) long and 4–11 cm (1 1/2–4 1/4 in) broad at the base, concavo-convex, thick, very rigid, and yellow-green to blue-green in color.

The flowers are white, sometimes with a purple tinge, 3–5 cm (1 1/4–2 in) long (rarely to 7.5 cm), bell-shaped and segmented into six parts; they are produced in a compact, bulbous cluster 60–120 cm (24–47 in) tall at the top of the stem. The fruit is an elongate berry, up to 11.5 cm (4.5 in) long.

== Distribution and habitat ==
Yucca schidigera is native to Arizona, Baja California, California, Nevada, and Utah. It is found in the southernmost part of Nevada, in Washington County in Utah, and the northwestern part of Arizona.

It is most common in the Mojave Desert, but is also widespread in the Sonoran Desert and west to the Pacific coast of southern California and into Baja California. Y. schidigera reaches its southernmost extent in the Baja California desert.

In the coastal part of its range, Y. schidigera usually associates with Adenostoma fasciculatum (chamise).

This yucca typically grows on rocky desert slopes and creosote desert flats between 300–1,200 m (980–3,940 ft) altitude, rarely up to 2,500 m (8,200 ft). They thrive in full sun and in soil with excellent drainage. It also needs no summer water. It is related to the banana yucca (Y. baccata), which occurs in the same general area; hybrids between the two are sometimes found.

== Fire ecology ==
Post fire, the Mojave yucca produces sprouts eagerly and the regeneration of the seedlings is witnessed. The fire regime is defined predominantly by heavy crop vegetation that take part in carrying the fire in the ecosystem. Over time, the invasive species that have been introduced to the ecosystem, such as grasses, have turned more fire tolerant, increasing the fire frequency and altering the fire regime that existed in the past.

Early accounts describe the flora of the Mojave Desert as arid grassland and shrubland communities. This ecosystem depended on winter precipitation. Y. schidigera was tolerant of this fire regime and rarely harmed. However, the introduction of nonnative grasses led to a higher frequency of fire, which decreased the survival rate of Y. schidigera.

== Uses ==
Moths gather pollen from the flowers and deposit it on the stigma of a flower, the ovary of which they lay their eggs in; the larvae eat of the fruit capsule as it grows, but leave behind some seeds to develop into fruit.

The fibers of the Yucca schidigera leaves are used by Native Americans to make rope, cloth, thread, and sandals. The flowers and fruit are eaten either raw or roasted, and the black seeds were ground into a flour. The roots are used to make soap. Some reports claim that Native Americans wash their hair with yucca to fight dandruff and hair loss. Among the other maladies this yucca has been used to treat are headaches, bleeding, gonorrhea, arthritis and rheumatism.

Currently, extracts from this plant are in animal feed and various herbal medications. The rigid flower stalk of the yucca, after maturation, is used as a substitute for eucalyptus stems or logs to make didgeridoos. It is also used as a natural deodorizer, and is used in pet deodorizers. Steroid saponins are produced commercially from Y. schidigera that can be used as naturally derived food-grade surfactant. Y. schidigera is an ingredient that is found in a quarter of dog food sold. It is mainly included in their food to reduce the waste odor of most pets.

Researchers have also found that the ingestion of Y. schidigera have decreased the blood cholesterol of human and chickens, increased vitamin and mineral absorption in animals, and increased cattle reproduction.

In fish, Yucca schidigera extract is beneficial. It can improve the growth rate in fish as a result of increased protein metabolism, requiring less food to sustain populations of fish. Outside of boosted growth rates, Yucca schidigera can also be used to improve the health of fish as it reduces ammonia that may be present in the water, generally improving the water quality. Evidence also suggests that Yucca schidigera is a suitable substitute in enabling fish to fight off the many diseases that characterize aquaculture.
