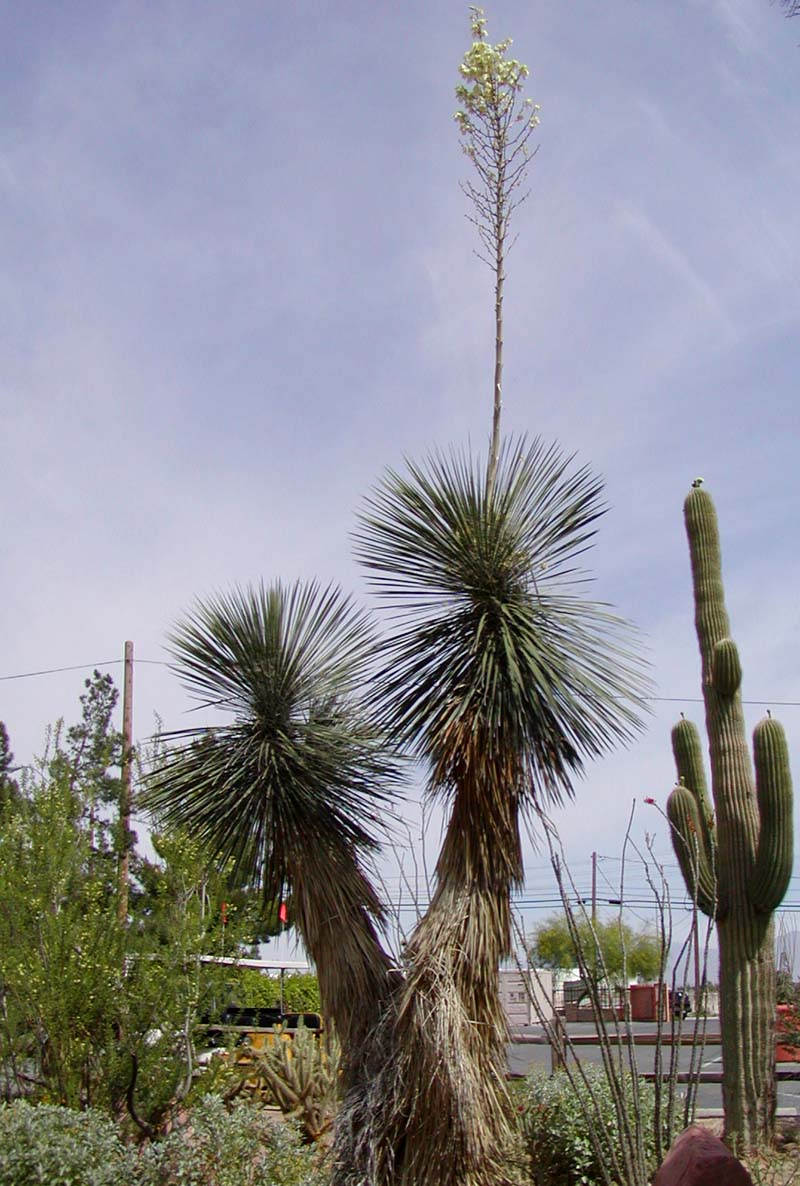
- Large soaptree yucca

Conservation status
- Least Concern (IUCN 3.1)

Scientific classification
- Kingdom: Plantae
- Clade: Embryophytes
- Clade: Tracheophytes
- Clade: Angiosperms
- Clade: Monocots
- Order: Asparagales
- Family: Asparagaceae
- Subfamily: Agavoideae
- Genus: Yucca
- Species: Y. elata

Binomial name
- Yucca elata Engelm.
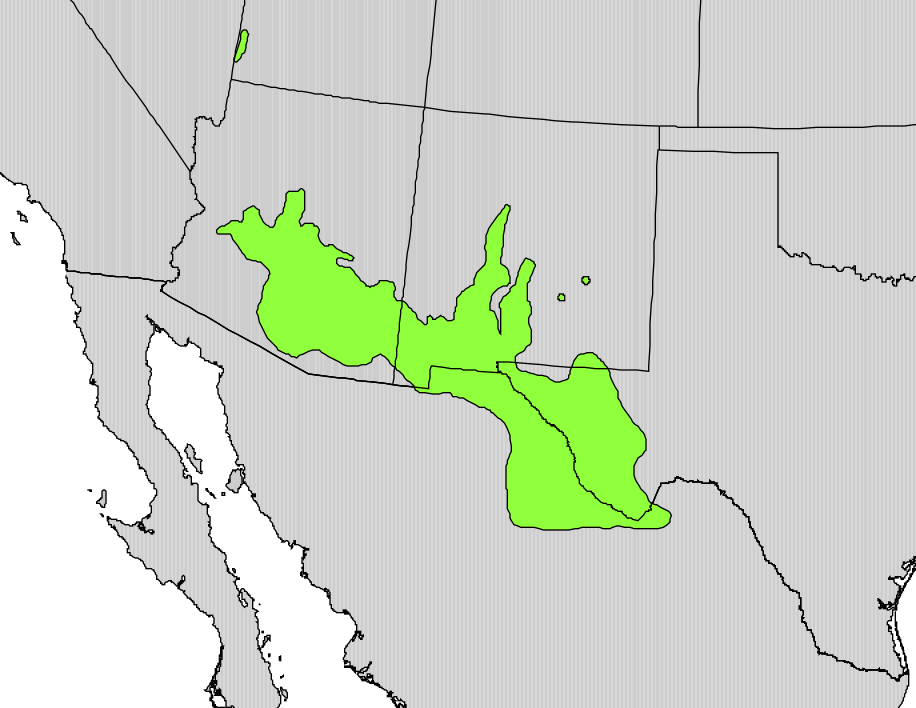
- Natural range

Synonyms
- Y. angustifolia var. elata Engelm.; Yucca angustifolia var. radiosa Engelm.; Yucca radiosa (Engelm.) Trel.; Yucca verdiensis McKelvey

= Yucca elata =

Species of flowering plant

Yucca elata is a perennial plant, with common names that include soaptree, soaptree yucca, soapweed, and palmella. It is native to southwestern North America, in the Sonoran Desert and Chihuahuan Desert in the United States (western Texas, New Mexico, Arizona), southern Nevada, southwestern Utah, and northern Mexico (Chihuahua, Coahuila, Sonora, Nuevo León). Yucca elata is widely distributed, although its population appears to be decreasing.

== Description ==
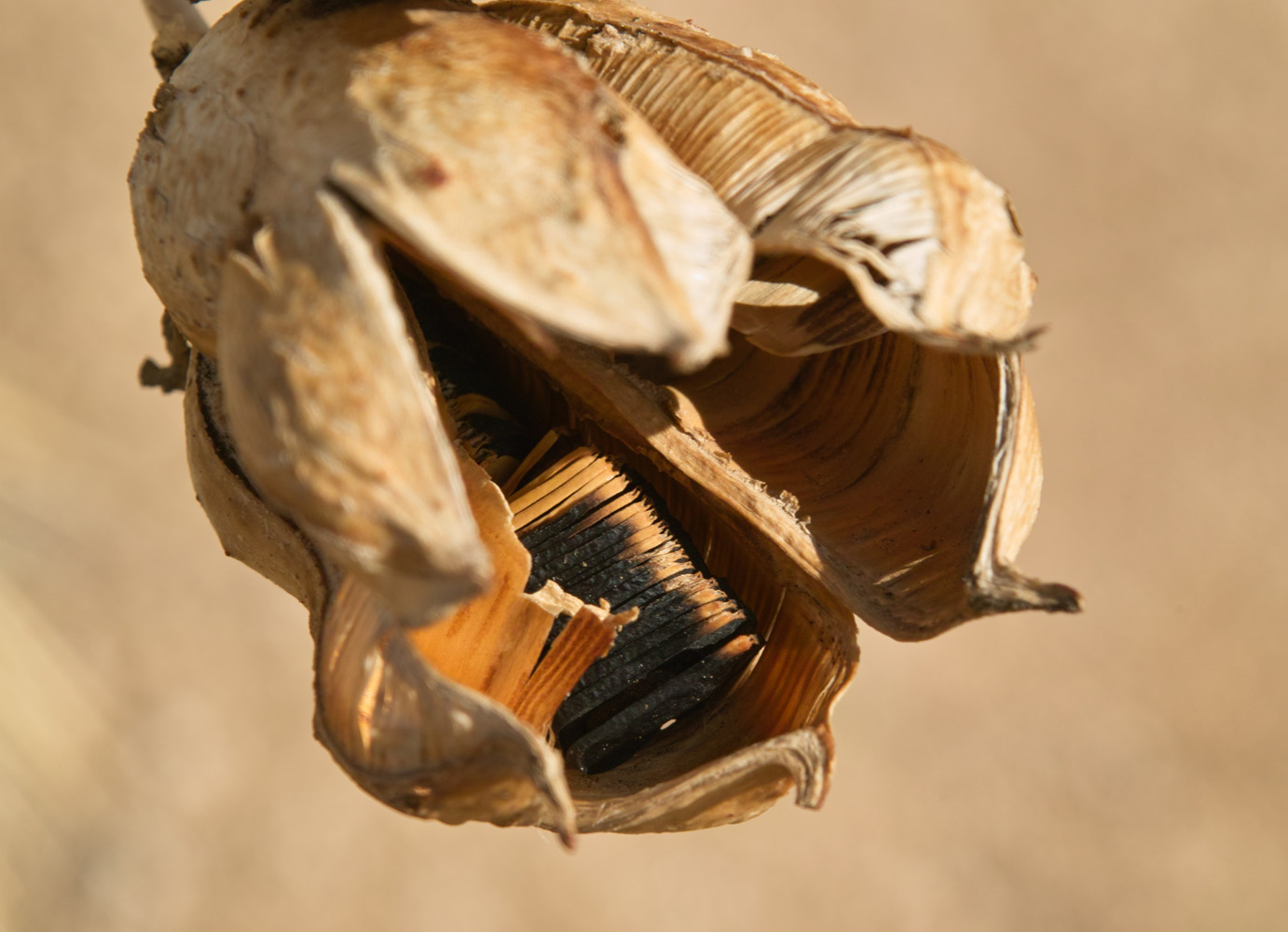
A dry, opened seed pod

This plant grows from 1.2 to 4.5 m tall, with a sparsely branched trunk. The trunk is brown, cylindrical in shape and has a small diameter and often has holes drilled by escaping yucca moth larvae. The leaves are arranged in a dense spiral whorl at the apex of the stems, each leaf 25–95 cm long and very slender, 0.2-1.3 cm broad. The white, bell-shaped flowers grow in a dense cluster on a slender stem at the apex of the stem, each flower 32–57 mm long, creamy white, often tinged pinkish or greenish.

The soaptree yucca's fruit is a capsule 4–8 cm long and 2–4 cm broad, maturing brown in summer, when it splits into three sections to release the black seeds. They do not flower every year.

== Ecology ==
These plants fare best in dry, semi-desert conditions. They are very cold-hardy, but need much sunlight.

== Subspecies ==
There are three subordinate taxa are sometimes recognized, although sources differ as to whether these should be considered varieties or subspecies:

- Yucca elata ssp. elata. Capsules large, 5–8 cm; leaves long, 30–95 cm. Throughout the species' range.
- Yucca elata ssp. verdiensis. Capsules small, 4-4.5 cm; leaves short, 25–45 cm. Arizona only.
- Yucca elata ssp. utahensis.

== Uses ==
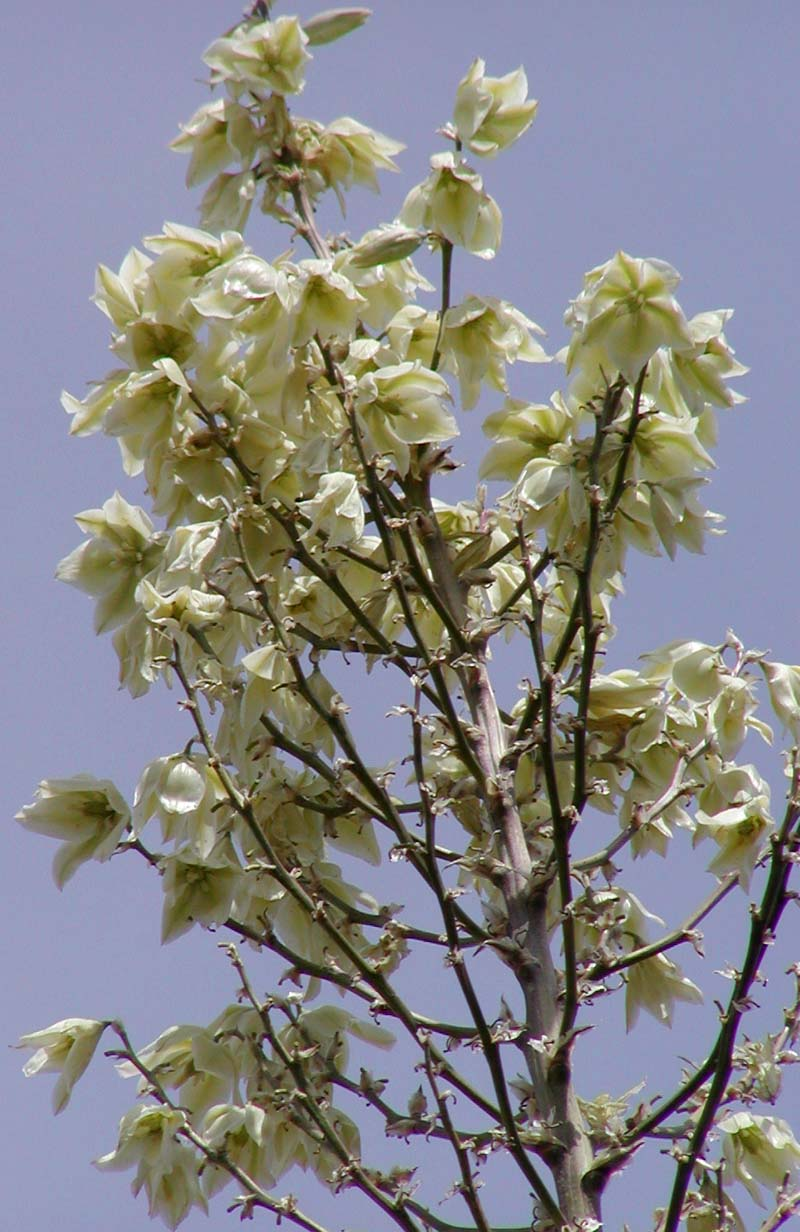
Yucca flowers

Native Americans used the fiber of the soaptree yucca's leaves to make sandals, belts, cloth, baskets, cords, and mats, among other items; they also ate the flowers. Inside the trunk and roots of the plant is a soapy substance high in saponins. In the past, this substance was commonly used as soap and shampoo, which was used to treat dandruff and hairloss. At least one tribe, the Zuni, used a mixture of soap made from yucca sap and ground aster to wash newborn babies to stimulate hair growth. The Apaches also use yucca leaf fibers to make dental floss and rope. In times of drought ranchers have used the plant as an emergency food supply for their cattle; the chopped trunk and leaves can be eaten.

== Symbolism ==
Flowers of the genus Yucca are the state flowers of US state of New Mexico. No species name is given in the statute citation, however the New Mexico Centennial Blue Book from 2012 references the soaptree yucca (Yucca elata) as one of the more widespread species in New Mexico.
