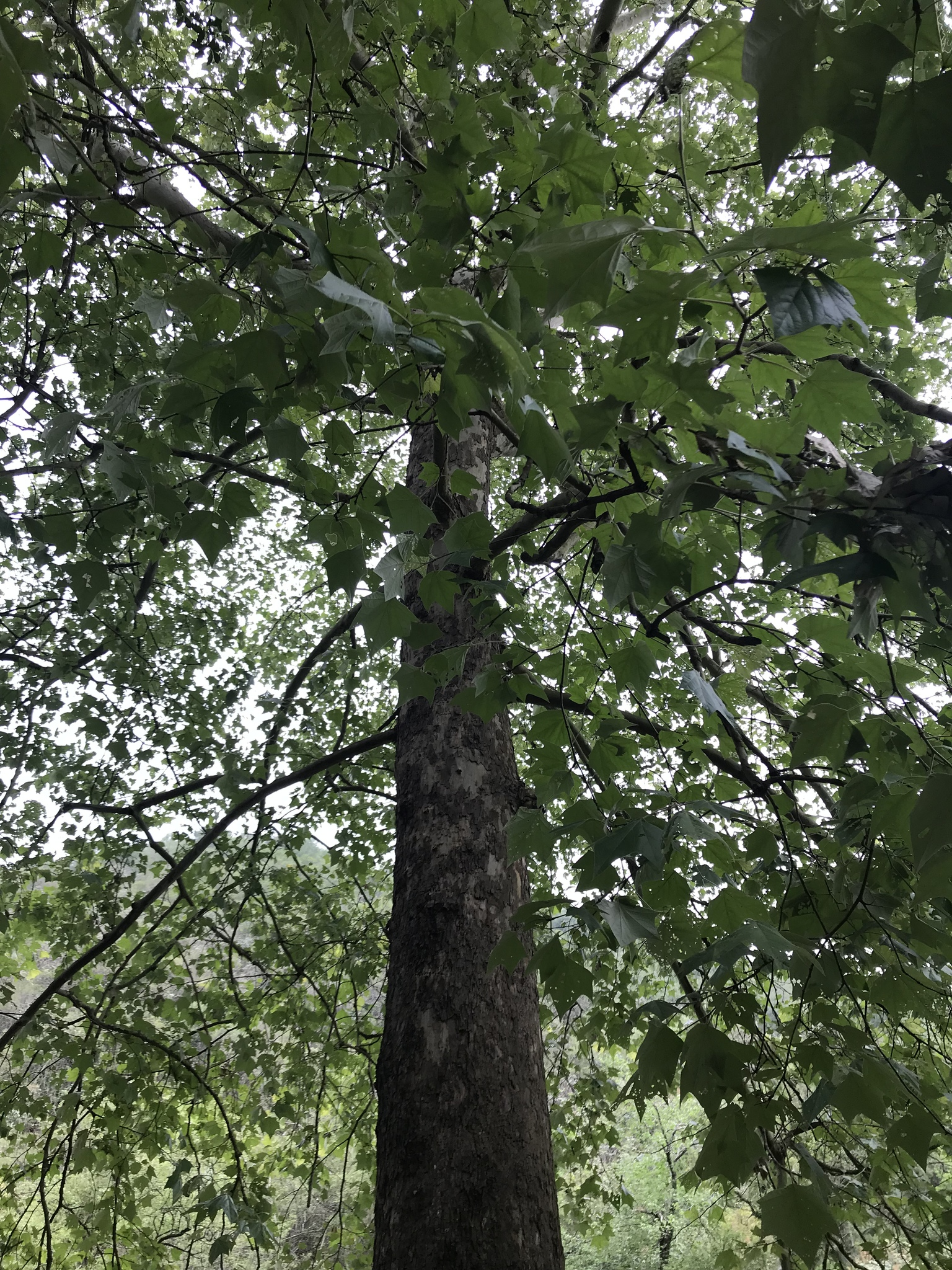

Conservation status
- Least Concern (IUCN 3.1)

Scientific classification
- Kingdom: Plantae
- Clade: Embryophytes
- Clade: Tracheophytes
- Clade: Spermatophytes
- Clade: Angiosperms
- Clade: Eudicots
- Order: Proteales
- Family: Platanaceae
- Genus: Platanus
- Species: P. rzedowskii

Binomial name
- Platanus rzedowskii Nixon ex J.M. Poole

= Platanus rzedowskii =

Species of tree

Platanus rzedowskii, commonly known as Rzedowski's plane tree, Rzedowski's sycamore, Sicómoro de la Sierra Madre Occidental, or the Sierra Madre Occidental sycamore, is a species of Platanus in the family Platanaceae. It was described by Jackie M. Poole in 2003 with the name attributed to Kevin C. Nixon.

== Description ==
Platanus rzedowskii on average reaches 80 ft (24 meters) or more, with a 30 ft (9 meters) width. Leaves are 8 in (20 centimeters) wide, and olive green, turning a yellow-green during the winter months. Roots are vast, and grow particularly to enormous degrees. Flowers are white, bloom December through February, fruiting occurs April through August months.

== Distribution and habitat ==
Platanus rzedowskii is endemic to northeastern Mexico, primarily parts of Nuevo León, San Luis Potosí, and Tamaulipas at 45–1,300 m elevation, where it grows in drier-climate conditions based on its range geography. It grows between and beside another almost identical species, Platanus mexicana.

== Conservation ==
Platanus rzedowskii is listed as "Least Concern" by the IUCN Red List, for there are no serious threats to the species besides two species of fungus, anthracnose and powdery mildew. Other threats may include, deforestation, wildfires, and human development, but are generally mild in the case that they are not as common of threats.

== Uses ==
Platanus rzedowskii has no other current uses besides being used as an ornamental tree, or its wood being harvested for commerce. Native Americans may have used the species for medical remedies in its range, but no evidence is clear on that discussion.
