= List of trees of Texas =

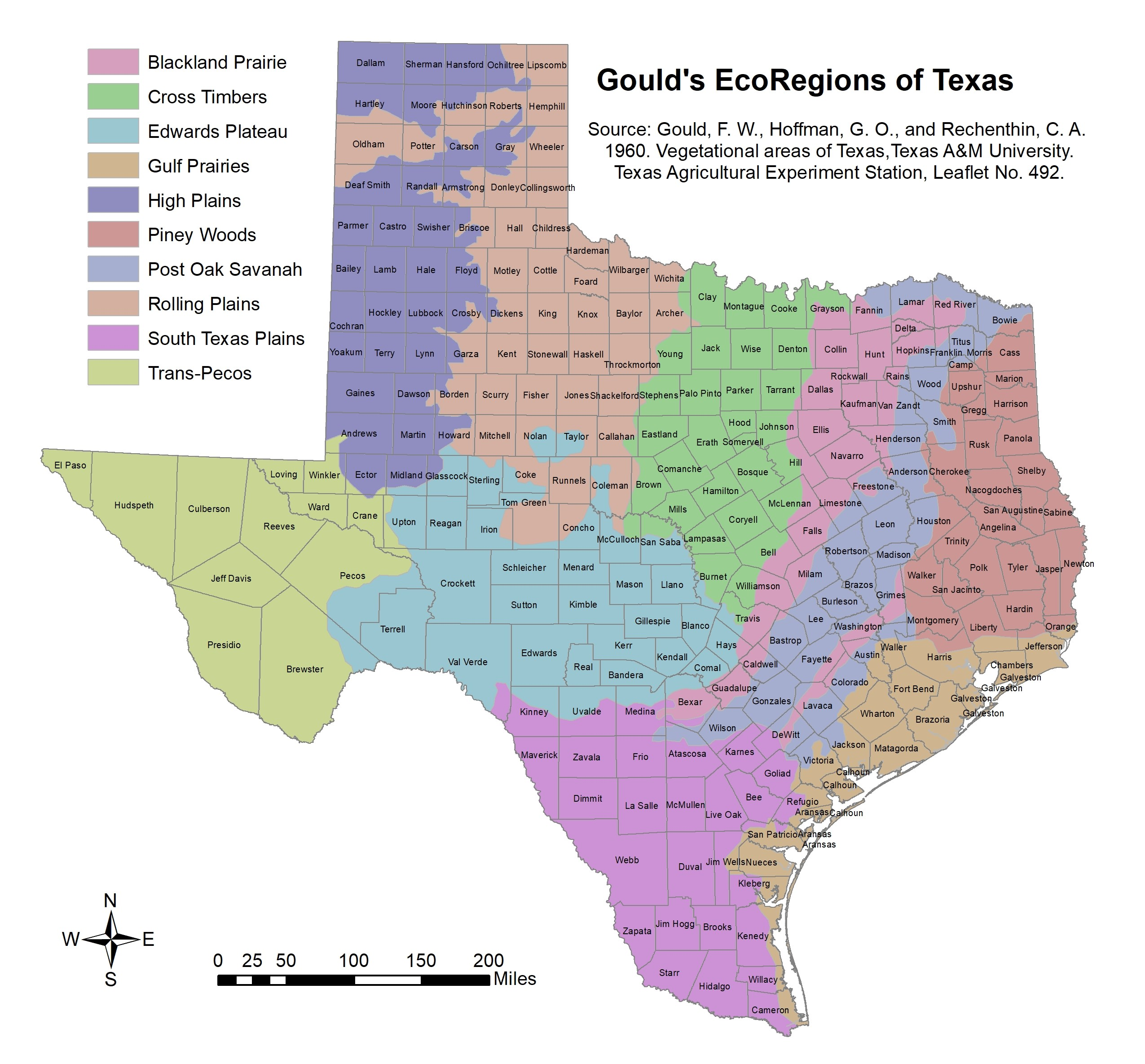
Gould's Ecoregions of Texas (1960). These regions approximately correspond to the EPA's level 3 ecoregions.

The following is a list of widely known trees and shrubs found in Texas. Taxonomic families for the following trees and shrubs are listed in alphabetical order by family.

Ecoregions are denoted by similar vegetation and environmental resources. Trees and shrubs are categorized into each of the ecoregions of Texas (equivalent to the EPA's Level 3 ecoregions). These categorizations can be generally accepted as a tree planting guide for each region. However, specific site conditions should be considered for any particular location. Likewise, consult the Texas Tree Planting Guide for recommendations.

Numerous non-native plants have been introduced to Texas in the United States and many of them have become invasive species. Plants that are considered invasive are denote with an (I).

Individual tree populations are experiencing severe decline, due to a loss in habitat and/or pests and disease. The conservation status for each known species is denoted in a separate column.

Conservation status
Least-concern species
Near-threatened species
Conservation-dependent species
Vulnerable species
Endangered species
Critically endangered
Invasive species

Gould's Ecoregions Abbreviations
PWD	Piney Woods
GPM	Gulf Prairies and Marshes
POS	Post Oak Savannah
BLP	Blackland Prairies
CTP	Cross Timbers and Prairies
STP	South Texas Plains
EDP	Edwards Plateau
RLP	Rolling Plains
HPS	High Plains
TPM	Trans-Pecos Mountains and Basins

== Gymnosperms ==
- Conifers
  - Cupressaceae: cypress family
  - Pinaceae: pine family
  - Podocarpaceae: podocarp family
  - Sciadopityaceae: umbrella pine family
  - Taxaceae: yew family
- Cycads
  - Cycadaceae: cycad family
- Maidenhair trees
  - Ginkgoaceae: maidenhair family

Acrogymnospermae
Picture	Scientific name	Common name	Family	Introduced	PWD	GPM	POS	BLP	CTP	STP	EDP	RLP	HPS	TPM	Conservation status	FIA Code (USA)
Conifers
Cupressaceae: cypress family
Cupressus: true cypresses
	Cupressus arizonica	Arizona cypress	Cupressaceae (cypress family)											Yes	IUCN (LC)	51
Juniperus: juniper trees
	Juniperus ashei	ashe juniper	Cupressaceae (cypress family)		Yes				Yes	Yes	Yes	Yes	Yes	Yes	IUCN (LC)	61
	Juniperus coahuilensis	redberry juniper	Cupressaceae (cypress family)							Yes	Yes	Yes	Yes		IUCN (LC)	59
	Juniperus deppeana	alligator juniper	Cupressaceae (cypress family)												IUCN (LC)	63
	Juniperus flaccida	drooping juniper	Cupressaceae (cypress family)												IUCN (LC)	60
	Juniperus monosperma	one seed juniper	Cupressaceae (cypress family)								Yes	Yes	Yes		IUCN (LC)	69
	Juniperus osteosperma	Utah juniper	Cupressaceae (cypress family)												IUCN (LC)	65
	Juniperus pinchotii	Pinchot juniper	Cupressaceae (cypress family)							Yes	Yes	Yes	Yes		IUCN (LC)	58
	Juniperus scopulorum	rocky mountain juniper	Cupressaceae (cypress family)									Yes	Yes		IUCN (LC)	66
	Juniperus virginiana var. silicicola	southern redcedar	Cupressaceae (cypress family)		Yes	Yes						Yes	Yes		IUCN (LC)	67
	Juniperus virginiana	eastern redcedar	Cupressaceae (cypress family)		Yes		Yes	Yes	Yes	Yes	Yes	Yes	Yes		IUCN (LC)	68
Taxodium: bald or swamp cypresses
	Taxodium ascendens	pondcypress	Cupressaceae (cypress family)		Yes										IUCN (LC)	222
	Taxodium distichum	baldcypress	Cupressaceae (cypress family)		Yes	Yes	Yes			Yes	Yes				IUCN (LC)	221
	Taxodium mucronatum	Montezuma cypress	Cupressaceae (cypress family)							Yes					IUCN (LC)	
Maidenhair trees
Ginkgoaceae: maidenhair family
Ginkgo: ginkgos or maidenhair trees
	Ginkgo biloba	ginkgo	Ginkgoaceae (maidenhair family)	Yes											IUCN (EN)	561
Pinaceae: pine family
Pinus: pines
	Pinus arizonica var. stormiae	Arizona pine	Pinaceae (pine family)											Yes	IUCN (LC)	
	Pinus cembroides	Mexican pinyon pine	Pinaceae (pine family)							Yes	Yes			Yes	IUCN (LC)	140
	Pinus echinata	shortleaf pine	Pinaceae (pine family)		Yes	Yes	Yes								IUCN (LC)	110
	Pinus edulis	pinyon pine	Pinaceae (pine family)							Yes	Yes			Yes	IUCN (LC)	106
	Pinus elliottii	slash pine	Pinaceae (pine family)		Yes										IUCN (LC)	111
	Pinus glabra	spruce pine	Pinaceae (pine family)		Yes										IUCN (LC)	115
	Pinus monophylla	singleleaf pinyon pine	Pinaceae (pine family)												IUCN (LC)	133
	Pinus palustris	longleaf pine	Pinaceae (pine family)		Yes	Yes	Yes								IUCN (EN)	121
	Pinus ponderosa var. scopulorum	ponderosa pine	Pinaceae (pine family)											Yes	IUCN (LC)	122
	Pinus remota	papershell pinyon pine	Pinaceae (pine family)							Yes	Yes				IUCN (LC)	141
	Pinus taeda	loblolly pine	Pinaceae (pine family)		Yes	Yes	Yes								IUCN (LC)	131
	Pinus virginiana	Virginia pine	Pinaceae (pine family)	Yes	Yes										IUCN (LC)	132
Pseudotsuga: Douglas firs
	Pseudotsuga menziesii	Douglas fir	Pinaceae (pine family)												IUCN (LC)	202

== Angiosperms ==
Hardwoods; Aceraceae: maple family; Agavaceae: agave family; Anacardiaceae: cashew family; Annonaceae: custard apple family; Aquifoliaceae: holly family; Araliaceae: ginseng family; Arecaceae: palm family; Betulaceae: birch family; Bignoniaceae: trumpet creeper family; Boraginaceae: borage family; Cannabaceae: hemp family; Caprifoliaceae: honeysuckle family; Celastraceae: bittersweet family	Cornaceae: dogwood family; Cyrillaceae: titi family; Ebenaceae: ebony family; Ericaceae: heather family; Euphorbiaceae: spurge family; Fabaceae: legume family (peas); Fagaceae: beech family; Hamamelidaceae: witch hazel family; Hippocastanaceae: buckeye family; Juglandaceae: walnut family; Lauraceae: laurel family; Lythraceae: loosestrife family; Magnoliaceae: magnolia family; Meliaceae: mahogany family	Moraceae: mulberry family; Moringaceae: moringa family; Myricaceae: bayberry family; Myrtaceae: myrtle family; Nyssaceae: sourgum family; Oleaceae: olive family; Platanaceae: sycamore family; Rhamnaceae: buckthorn family; Rosaceae: rose family; Rubiaceae: madder family; Rutaceae: citrus family; Salicaceae: willow family; Sapindaceae: soapberry family	Sapotaceae: sapodilla family; Simaroubaceae: quassia family; Solanaceae: nightshade family; Sterculiaceae: sterculia family; Styracaceae: storax family; Symplocaceae: sweetleaf family; Tamaricaceae: tamarisk family; Tiliaceae: basswood family; Ulmaceae: elm family; Verbenaceae: verbena family; Zygophyllaceae: caltrop family

Angiospermae
Picture	Scientific name	Common name	Family	Introduced	PWD	GPM	POS	BLP	CTP	STP	EDP	RLP	HPS	TPM	Conservation status	FIA Code (USA)
Hardwoods
Aceraceae: maple family
Acer: maples
	Acer floridanum	Florida maple	Aceraceae (maple family)		Yes										IUCN (LC)	311
	Acer grandidentatum	bigtooth maple	Aceraceae (maple family)								Yes			Yes	IUCN (LC)	322
	Acer leucoderme	chalk maple	Aceraceae (maple family)		Yes										IUCN (LC)	323
	Acer negundo	boxelder	Aceraceae (maple family)		Yes	Yes	Yes	Yes	Yes	Yes	Yes				IUCN (LC)	313
	Acer pensylvanicum	striped maple	Aceraceae (maple family)		Yes										IUCN (LC)	315
	Acer rubrum	red maple	Aceraceae (maple family)		Yes	Yes	Yes								IUCN (LC)	316
	Acer saccharinum	silver maple	Aceraceae (maple family)	Yes	Yes										IUCN (LC)	317
	Acer saccharum	sugar maple	Aceraceae (maple family)		Yes										IUCN (LC)	318
Agavaceae: agave family
Yucca: yuccas
	Yucca elata	soaptree yucca	Agavaceae (agave family)											Yes		
	Yucca faxoniana	giant dagger	Agavaceae (agave family)													
	Yucca rostrata	beaked yucca	Agavaceae (agave family)											Yes		
	Yucca thompsoniana	Thompson's yucca	Agavaceae (agave family)											Yes		
	Yucca torreyi	Torrey's yucca	Agavaceae (agave family)							Yes	Yes			Yes		
	Yucca treculeana	Spanish dagger	Agavaceae (agave family)			Yes				Yes	Yes					
Anacardiaceae: cashew family
Cotinus: smoke trees
	Cotinus obovatus	American smoke tree	Anacardiaceae (cashew family)								Yes				IUCN (LC)	
Pistacia: pistachios and terebinth
	Pistacia chinensis	Chinese pistachio	Anacardiaceae (cashew family)	Yes											IUCN (LC); Texas (I)	
	Pistacia texana	Texas pistache	Anacardiaceae (cashew family)								Yes				IUCN (NT)	
Rhus: sumacs
	Rhus copallina	winged sumac	Anacardiaceae (cashew family)		Yes	Yes	Yes	Yes							IUCN (LC)	
	Rhus lanceolata	prairie sumac	Anacardiaceae (cashew family)						Yes		Yes	Yes		Yes		
Annonaceae: custard apple family
Asimina: pawpaws
	Asimina triloba	pawpaw	Annonaceae (custard apple family)		Yes										IUCN (LC)	367
Aquifoliaceae: holly family
Ilex: holly trees
	Ilex decidua	possumhaw	Aquifoliaceae (holly family)		Yes	Yes	Yes	Yes			Yes				IUCN (LC)	
	Ilex opaca	American holly	Aquifoliaceae (holly family)		Yes	Yes	Yes								IUCN (LC)	591
	Ilex verticillata	common winterberry	Aquifoliaceae (holly family)		Yes	Yes									IUCN (LC)	
	Ilex vomitoria	yaupon	Aquifoliaceae (holly family)		Yes	Yes	Yes	Yes							IUCN (LC)	
Araliaceae: ginseng family
Aralia: aralias
	Aralia spinosa	Devil's walkingstick	Araliaceae (ginseng family)		Yes	Yes	Yes								IUCN (LC)	
Arecaceae: palm family
Sabal: sabal palms
	Sabal louisiana	Louisiana palm	Arecaceae (palm family)		Yes	Yes										
	Sabal mexicana	Mexican palmetto	Arecaceae (palm family)							Yes						
Washingtonia: washingtonia palm trees
	Washingtonia filifera	California fan palm	Arecaceae (palm family)	Yes											IUCN (NT)	
Betulaceae: birch family
Alnus: alders
	Alnus serrulata	common alder	Betulaceae (birch family)		Yes										IUCN (LC)	
Betula: birches
	Betula nigra	river birch	Betulaceae (birch family)		Yes		Yes								IUCN (LC)	373
Carpinus: hornbeams
	Carpinus caroliniana	American hornbeam	Betulaceae (birch family)		Yes	Yes	Yes								IUCN (LC)	391
Ostrya: false hornbeams
	Ostrya virginiana	eastern hophornbeam	Betulaceae (birch family)		Yes		Yes								IUCN (LC)	71
Bignoniaceae: trumpet creeper family
Catalpa: catalpa trees
	Catalpa bignonioides	southern catalpa	Bignoniaceae (trumpet creeper family)	Yes	Yes										IUCN (NT)	451
	Catalpa speciosa	northern catalpa	Bignoniaceae (trumpet creeper family)		Yes							Yes	Yes			452
Chilopsis: desert willows
	Chilopsis linearis	desert willow	Bignoniaceae (trumpet creeper family)								Yes			Yes	IUCN (LC)	
Paulownia: paulownia trees
	Paulownia tomentosa	empress-tree	Bignoniaceae (trumpet creeper family)		Yes											712
Tecoma: tecoma trees
	Tecoma stans	yellow elder	Bignoniaceae (trumpet creeper family)			Yes				Yes	Yes			Yes		
Boraginaceae: borage family
Cordia: cordia trees
	Cordia boissieri	Mexican olive	Boraginaceae (borage family)													
Ehretia: ehretia trees
	Ehretia anacua	sandpaper tree	Boraginaceae (borage family)			Yes	Yes	Yes		Yes						523
Cannabaceae: hemp family
Celtis: hackberries and sugarberries
	Celtis laevigata	sugarberry	Cannabaceae (hemp family)		Yes	Yes	Yes	Yes	Yes	Yes	Yes	Yes	Yes	Yes		461
	Celtis lindheimeri	Lindheimer's hackberry	Cannabaceae (hemp family)								Yes				IUCN (VU)	
	Celtis occidentalis	hackberry	Cannabaceae (hemp family)		Yes					Yes	Yes	Yes	Yes		IUCN (LC)	462
	Celtis pallida	desert hackberry	Cannabaceae (hemp family)							Yes	Yes			Yes		
	Celtis reticulata	netleaf hackberry	Cannabaceae (hemp family)			Yes	Yes	Yes	Yes	Yes	Yes	Yes	Yes	Yes		
Caprifoliaceae: honeysuckle family
Sambucus: elders
	Sambucus canadensis	American elder	Caprifoliaceae (honeysuckle family)		Yes	Yes	Yes	Yes	Yes	Yes	Yes				IUCN (LC)	
Viburnum: viburnum and blackhaws
	Viburnum rufidulum	rusty blackhaw	Caprifoliaceae (honeysuckle family)		Yes	Yes	Yes	Yes	Yes		Yes			Yes	IUCN (LC)	
Celastraceae: bittersweet family
Euonymus: euonymus
	Euonymus atropurpureus	burningbush	EuonymCelastraceaeus (bittersweet family)					Yes	Yes						IUCN (LC)	
Cornaceae: dogwood family
Cornus: dogwoods
	Cornus drummondii	roughleaf dogwood	Cornaceae (dogwood family)		Yes		Yes	Yes	Yes		Yes				IUCN (LC)	
	Cornus florida	flowering dogwood	Cornaceae (dogwood family)		Yes		Yes								IUCN (LC)	491
Cyrillaceae: titi family
Cyrilla: cyrilla trees
	Cyrilla racemiflora	titi	Cyrillaceae (titi family)		Yes	Yes									IUCN (LC)	
Ebenaceae: ebony family
Diospyros: ebony and persimmons
	Diospyros texana	Texas persimmon	Ebenaceae (ebony family)		Yes					Yes	Yes	Yes				522
	Diospyros virginiana	common persimmon	Ebenaceae (ebony family)		Yes		Yes		Yes						IUCN (LC)	521
Ericaceae: heather family
Arbutus: arbutus trees
	Arbutus xalapensis	Texas madrone	Ericaceae (heath family)								Yes		Yes	Yes	IUCN (CD)	363
Oxydendrum: oxydendrum trees
	Oxydendrum arboreum	sourwood	Ericaceae (heath family)		Yes										IUCN (LC)	711
Vaccinium: blueberries, cranberries, and sparkleberries
	Vaccinium arboreum	farkleberry	Ericaceae (heath family)		Yes	Yes	Yes								IUCN (LC)	
Euphorbiaceae: spurge family
Aleurites: aleurites trees
Sapium: tallow trees
	Sapium sebiferum	Chinese tallow tree	Euphorbiaceae (spurge family)	Yes											Texas (I)	994
	Vernicia fordii	tungoil tree	Euphorbiaceae (spurge family)	Yes	Yes											995
Fabaceae: legume family (peas)
Albizia: silk trees and false acacias
	Albizia julibrissin	silktree	Fabaceae (legume family (peas))	Yes	Yes										Texas (I)	345
Bauhinia: orchid trees
	Bauhinia lunarioides	Texasplume	Fabaceae (legume family (peas))								Yes					
Caesalpinia: bird-of-paradise trees
	Caesalpinia mexicana	Mexican bird-of-paradise tree	Fabaceae (legume family (peas))							Yes						
Cercis: redbuds
	Cercis canadensis	eastern redbud	Fabaceae (legume family (peas))		Yes	Yes	Yes	Yes	Yes		Yes	Yes			IUCN (LC)	471
	Cercis canadensis var. texana	Texas redbud	Fabaceae (legume family (peas))					Yes	Yes		Yes	Yes				
Dermatophyllum: mescalbeans
	Dermatophyllum secundiflorum	Texas mountain laurel	Fabaceae (legume family (peas))							Yes	Yes			Yes		
Ebenopsis:
	Ebenopsis ebano	Texas ebony	Fabaceae (legume family (peas))			Yes				Yes						
Erythrina: coral trees
	Erythrina herbacea	coral bean tree	Fabaceae (legume family (peas))							Yes						
Gleditsia: false locust
	Gleditsia aquatica	waterlocust	Fabaceae (legume family (peas))		Yes	Yes	Yes			Yes					IUCN (LC)	551
	Gleditsia triacanthos	honeylocust	Fabaceae (legume family (peas))		Yes	Yes	Yes	Yes	Yes	Yes	Yes	Yes	Yes		IUCN (LC)	552
Gymnocladus: bymnocladus trees
	Gymnocladus dioicus	Kentucky coffeetree	Fabaceae (legume family (peas))		Yes										IUCN (LC)	571
Havardia: havardia trees
	Havardia pallens	huajillo	Fabaceae (legume family (peas))			Yes				Yes						
Leucaena: leucaena trees
	Leucaena pulverulenta	great leadtree	Fabaceae (legume family (peas))			Yes				Yes	Yes					
	Leucaena retusa	littleleaf leadtree	Fabaceae (legume family (peas))								Yes			Yes	IUCN (NT)	
Parkinsonia: parkinsonia trees
	Parkinsonia aculeata	Jerusalem-thorn	Fabaceae (legume family (peas))			Yes	Yes	Yes	Yes	Yes	Yes			Yes		
	Parkinsonia texana	Texas palo verde	Fabaceae (legume family (peas))			Yes				Yes	Yes					
Prosopis: mesquites and kiawes
	Prosopis glandulosa	honey mesquite	Fabaceae (legume family (peas))		Yes	Yes	Yes	Yes	Yes	Yes	Yes	Yes	Yes	Yes	IUCN (NT)	756
	Prosopis pubescens	screwbean mesquite	Fabaceae (legume family (peas))								Yes	Yes		Yes		758
Robinia: locusts
	Robinia pseudoacacia	black locust	Fabaceae (legume family (peas))	Yes	Yes							Yes	Yes		IUCN (LC)	91
Senegalia: gum acacias
	Senegalia berlandieri	Berlandier acacia	Fabaceae (legume family (peas))			Yes				Yes					IUCN (NT)	
	Senegalia greggii	catclaw acacia	Fabaceae (legume family (peas))							Yes	Yes			Yes	IUCN (LC)	
	Senegalia wrightii	Wright acacia	Fabaceae (legume family (peas))						Yes		Yes	Yes		Yes		
	Senegalia roemeriana	Roemer acacia	Fabaceae (legume family (peas))								Yes	Yes		Yes		
Styphnolobium: necklacepods
	Styphnolobium affine	Eve's necklace	Fabaceae (legume family (peas))					Yes	Yes		Yes					
Vachellia: acacias
	Vachellia farnesiana	sweet acacia	Fabaceae (legume family (peas))			Yes	Yes			Yes	Yes	Yes		Yes	IUCN (LC)	33
	Vachellia rigidula	blackbrush acacia	Fabaceae (legume family (peas))								Yes			Yes		
	Vachellia schaffneri	twisted acacia	Fabaceae (legume family (peas))			Yes				Yes	Yes					
Fagaceae: beech family
Castanea: chestnuts and chinkapins
	Castanea mollissima	Chinese chestnut	Fagaceae (beech family)		Yes											424
	Castanea pumila	Allegheny chinkapin	Fagaceae (beech family)		Yes										IUCN (LC)	422
Fagus: beeches
	Fagus grandifolia	American beech	Fagaceae (beech family)		Yes										IUCN (LC)	531
Quercus: oaks
	Quercus alba	white oak	Fagaceae (beech family)		Yes										IUCN (LC)	82
	Quercus bicolor	swamp white oak	Fagaceae (beech family)		Yes											84
	Quercus buckleyi	Texas red oak	Fagaceae (beech family)				Yes	Yes	Yes		Yes				IUCN (LC)	8513
	Quercus coccinea	scarlet oak	Fagaceae (beech family)		Yes										IUCN (LC)	86
	Quercus emoryi	emory oak	Fagaceae (beech family)								Yes			Yes	IUCN (LC)	81
	Quercus falcata	southern red oak	Fagaceae (beech family)		Yes	Yes	Yes				Yes	Yes			IUCN (LC)	812
	Quercus fusiformis	escarpment live oak	Fagaceae (beech family)			Yes	Yes	Yes	Yes	Yes	Yes					
	Quercus gambelii	Gambel oak	Fagaceae (beech family)											Yes	IUCN (LC)	814
	Quercus gravesii	Chisos red oak	Fagaceae (beech family)											Yes	IUCN (LC)	
	Quercus grisea	gray oak	Fagaceae (beech family)								Yes			Yes	IUCN (LC)	846
	Quercus havardii	Havard oak	Fagaceae (beech family)									Yes	Yes		IUCN (NT)	
	Quercus hypoleucoides	silverleaf oak	Fagaceae (beech family)											Yes	IUCN (LC)	843
	Quercus ilicifolia	bear oak	Fagaceae (beech family)								Yes				IUCN (LC)	816
	Quercus imbricaria	shingle oak	Fagaceae (beech family)		Yes										IUCN (LC)	817
	Quercus incana	bluejack oak	Fagaceae (beech family)		Yes	Yes	Yes								IUCN (LC)	842
	Quercus laceyi	lacey oak	Fagaceae (beech family)								Yes			Yes	IUCN (LC)	8514
	Quercus laevis	turkey oak	Fagaceae (beech family)		Yes										IUCN (LC)	819
	Quercus laurifolia	laurel oak	Fagaceae (beech family)		Yes										IUCN (LC)	82
	Quercus lyrata	overcup oak	Fagaceae (beech family)		Yes	Yes	Yes								IUCN (LC)	822
	Quercus macrocarpa	bur oak	Fagaceae (beech family)		Yes	Yes	Yes	Yes	Yes		Yes				IUCN (LC)	823
	Quercus margarettiae	dwarf post oak	Fagaceae (beech family)		Yes										IUCN (LC)	84
	Quercus marilandica	blackjack oak	Fagaceae (beech family)		Yes	Yes	Yes	Yes	Yes	Yes	Yes	Yes			IUCN (LC)	824
	Quercus michauxii	swamp chestnut oak	Fagaceae (beech family)		Yes	Yes					Yes				IUCN (LC)	825
	Quercus mohriana	Mohr oak	Fagaceae (beech family)								Yes	Yes		Yes	IUCN (LC)	
	Quercus muehlenbergii	chinkapin oak	Fagaceae (beech family)		Yes		Yes	Yes	Yes		Yes	Yes			IUCN (LC)	826
	Quercus nigra	water oak	Fagaceae (beech family)		Yes	Yes	Yes			Yes	Yes				IUCN (LC)	827
	Quercus pagoda	cherrybark oak	Fagaceae (beech family)		Yes										IUCN (LC)	813
	Quercus palustris	pin oak	Fagaceae (beech family)								Yes				IUCN (LC)	83
	Quercus phellos	willow oak	Fagaceae (beech family)		Yes	Yes	Yes								IUCN (LC)	831
	Quercus polymorpha	Mexican white oak	Fagaceae (beech family)											Yes	IUCN (LC)	
	Quercus prinus	chestnut oak	Fagaceae (beech family)		Yes										IUCN (LC)	832
	Quercus pungens	sandpaper oak	Fagaceae (beech family)											Yes	IUCN (LC)	
	Quercus rubra	northern red oak	Fagaceae (beech family)		Yes										IUCN (LC)	833
	Quercus shumardii	shumard oak	Fagaceae (beech family)		Yes	Yes	Yes	Yes	Yes		Yes	Yes			IUCN (LC)	834
	Quercus similis	bottomland post oak	Fagaceae (beech family)		Yes	Yes	Yes			Yes					IUCN (LC)	836
	Quercus sinuata var. breviloba	Bigelow oak	Fagaceae (beech family)					Yes	Yes		Yes	Yes				
	Quercus sinuata var. sinuata	Durand oak	Fagaceae (beech family)		Yes					Yes	Yes	Yes			IUCN (LC)	88
	Quercus stellata	post oak	Fagaceae (beech family)		Yes	Yes	Yes	Yes	Yes	Yes	Yes	Yes			IUCN (LC)	835
	Quercus texana	nuttall oak	Fagaceae (beech family)		Yes						Yes				IUCN (LC)	828
	Quercus turbinella	shrub live oak	Fagaceae (beech family)											Yes	IUCN (LC)	
	Quercus undulata	waxy leaf oak	Fagaceae (beech family)											Yes		
	Quercus vaseyana	Vasey oak	Fagaceae (beech family)								Yes			Yes	IUCN (LC)	
	Quercus velutina	black oak	Fagaceae (beech family)		Yes		Yes				Yes				IUCN (LC)	837
	Quercus virginiana	live oak	Fagaceae (beech family)		Yes	Yes	Yes	Yes		Yes	Yes	Yes	Yes		IUCN (LC)	838
Hamamelidaceae: witch hazel family
Hamamelis: witch-hazels
	Hamamelis virginiana	witch-hazel	Hamamelidaceae (witch hazel family)		Yes										IUCN (LC)	
Liquidambar: liquidambar trees
	Liquidambar styraciflua	sweetgum	Hamamelidaceae (witch hazel family)		Yes	Yes	Yes								IUCN (LC)	611
Hippocastanaceae: buckeye family
Aesculus: buckeyes and horse chestnuts
	Aesculus glabra var. arguta	Texas buckeye	Hippocastanaceae (buckeye family)		Yes					Yes	Yes					334
	Aesculus pavia var. flavescens	yellow buckeye	Hippocastanaceae (buckeye family)								Yes					
	Aesculus pavia var. pavia	red buckeye	Hippocastanaceae (buckeye family)		Yes		Yes	Yes			Yes					
Juglandaceae: walnut family
Carya: hickories and pecans
	Carya aquatica	water hickory	Juglandaceae (walnut family)		Yes	Yes	Yes								IUCN (LC)	41
	Carya carolinae-septentrionalis	southern shagbark hickory	Juglandaceae (walnut family)		Yes											413
	Carya cordiformis	bitternut hickory	Juglandaceae (walnut family)		Yes	Yes	Yes	Yes							IUCN (LC)	42
	Carya glabra	pignut hickory	Juglandaceae (walnut family)		Yes		Yes			Yes	Yes				IUCN (LC)	43
	Carya illinoinensis	pecan	Juglandaceae (walnut family)		Yes	Yes	Yes	Yes	Yes	Yes	Yes	Yes				44
	Carya laciniosa	shellbark hickory	Juglandaceae (walnut family)		Yes										IUCN (LC)	45
	Carya myristiciformis	nutmeg hickory	Juglandaceae (walnut family)		Yes	Yes	Yes				Yes				IUCN (LC)	46
	Carya ovata	shagbark hickory	Juglandaceae (walnut family)		Yes										IUCN (LC)	47
	Carya pallida	sand hickory	Juglandaceae (walnut family)		Yes										IUCN (LC)	41
	Carya texana	black hickory	Juglandaceae (walnut family)		Yes		Yes		Yes	Yes	Yes					48
	Carya tomentosa	mockernut hickory	Juglandaceae (walnut family)		Yes		Yes								IUCN (LC)	49
Juglans: walnuts
	Juglans cinerea	butternut	Juglandaceae (walnut family)		Yes										IUCN (EN)	61
	Juglans major	Arizona walnut	Juglandaceae (walnut family)								Yes			Yes		66
	Juglans microcarpa	little walnut	Juglandaceae (walnut family)						Yes	Yes	Yes	Yes		Yes		65
	Juglans nigra	black walnut	Juglandaceae (walnut family)		Yes	Yes	Yes	Yes	Yes	Yes	Yes	Yes	Yes		IUCN (LC)	62
Lauraceae: laurel family
Cinnamomum: cinnamon and camphor
	Cinnamomum camphora	camphor tree	Lauraceae (laurel family)	Yes												858
Persea: bay trees
	Persea borbonia	redbay	Lauraceae (laurel family)		Yes	Yes									IUCN (LC)	721
Sassafras: sassafras trees
	Sassafras albidum	sassafras	Lauraceae (laurel family)		Yes		Yes								IUCN (LC)	931
Lythraceae: loosestrife family
Lagerstroemia: lagerstroemia trees
	Lagerstroemia indica	crepe myrtle	Lythraceae (loosestrife family)	Yes												
Magnoliaceae: magnolia family
Liriodendron: tulip trees
	Liriodendron tulipifera	yellow poplar	Magnoliaceae (magnolia family)		Yes										IUCN (LC)	621
Magnolia: magnolias
	Magnolia acuminata	cucumbertree	Magnoliaceae (magnolia family)		Yes										IUCN (LC)	651
	Magnolia grandiflora	southern magnolia	Magnoliaceae (magnolia family)		Yes										IUCN (LC)	652
	Magnolia macrophylla	bigleaf magnolia	Magnoliaceae (magnolia family)		Yes										IUCN (LC)	654
	Magnolia virginiana	sweetbay	Magnoliaceae (magnolia family)		Yes										IUCN (LC)	653
Meliaceae: mahogany family
Melia: berry mahoganies
	Melia azedarach	chinaberry	Meliaceae (mahogany family)	Yes	Yes						Yes	Yes			Texas (I)	993
Moraceae: mulberry family
Maclura: cockspur thorns
	Maclura pomifera	osage orange	Moraceae (mulberry family)		Yes	Yes	Yes	Yes	Yes	Yes	Yes	Yes	Yes	Yes		641
Morus: mulberries
	Morus alba	white mulberry	Moraceae (mulberry family)	Yes	Yes										Texas (I)	681
	Morus microphylla	Texas mulberry	Moraceae (mulberry family)								Yes					683
	Morus rubra	red mulberry	Moraceae (mulberry family)		Yes	Yes	Yes	Yes	Yes	Yes	Yes	Yes	Yes		IUCN (LC)	682
Myricaceae: bayberry family
Myrica: bayberries
	Myrica cerifera	wax myrtle	Myricaceae (bayberry family)		Yes	Yes	Yes								IUCN (LC)	
Myrtaceae: myrtle family
Melaleuca: melaleuca trees
	Melaleuca quinquenervia	paper bark tea tree	Myrtaceae (myrtle family)		Yes											992
Nyssaceae: sourgum family
Nyssa: tupelo trees
	Nyssa aquatica	water tupelo	Nyssaceae (sourgum family)		Yes										IUCN (LC)	691
	Nyssa biflora	swamp tupelo	Nyssaceae (sourgum family)		Yes										IUCN (LC)	694
	Nyssa ogeche	Ogeechee tupelo	Nyssaceae (sourgum family)		Yes										IUCN (LC)	692
	Nyssa sylvatica	black tupelo	Nyssaceae (sourgum family)		Yes	Yes	Yes								IUCN (LC)	693
Oleaceae: olive family
Chionanthus: fringe trees
	Chionanthus virginicus	white fringe tree	Oleaceae (olive family)		Yes										IUCN (LC)	
Forestiera: false privets
	Forestiera acuminata	swamp privet	Oleaceae (olive family)		Yes	Yes	Yes								IUCN (LC)	
Fraxinus: ashes
	Fraxinus americana	white ash	Oleaceae (olive family)		Yes	Yes	Yes	Yes		Yes	Yes				IUCN (CR)	541
	Fraxinus berlandierana	Berlandier ash	Oleaceae (olive family)			Yes				Yes						
	Fraxinus caroliniana	Carolina ash	Oleaceae (olive family)		Yes										IUCN (EN)	548
	Fraxinus cuspidata	fragrant ash	Oleaceae (olive family)								Yes			Yes		
	Fraxinus nigra	black ash	Oleaceae (olive family)		Yes										IUCN (CR)	543
	Fraxinus pennsylvanica	green ash	Oleaceae (olive family)		Yes	Yes	Yes	Yes	Yes	Yes	Yes	Yes	Yes		IUCN (CR)	544
	Fraxinus profunda	pumpkin ash	Oleaceae (olive family)		Yes										IUCN (CR)	545
	Fraxinus texensis	Texas ash	Oleaceae (olive family)							Yes	Yes	Yes				549
	Fraxinus velutina	Arizona ash	Oleaceae (olive family)											Yes		547
Ligustrum: privets
	Ligustrum japonicum	Japanese privet	Oleaceae (olive family)	Yes											Texas (I)	
	Ligustrum lucidum	glossy privet	Oleaceae (olive family)	Yes											Texas (I)	
	Ligustrum sinense	Chinese privet	Oleaceae (olive family)	Yes											Texas (I)	
Platanaceae: sycamore family
Platanus: sycamores
	Platanus occidentalis	American sycamore	Platanaceae (sycamore family)		Yes	Yes	Yes	Yes	Yes	Yes	Yes				IUCN (LC)	731
	Platanus palmeri		Platanaceae (sycamore family)													
Rhamnaceae: buckthorn family
Condalia: snakewoods and bluewoods
	Condalia hookeri	bluewood	Rhamnaceae (buckthorn family)			Yes	Yes			Yes	Yes				IUCN (LC)	867
Frangula: buckthorns
	Frangula caroliniana	Carolina buckthorn	Rhamnaceae (buckthorn family)		Yes	Yes	Yes	Yes	Yes		Yes				IUCN (LC)	
Karwinskia: karwinskias
	Karwinskia humboldtiana	Humboldt coyotillo	Rhamnaceae (buckthorn family)							Yes				Yes		
Rosaceae: rose family
Cercocarpus: mountain mahoganies
	Cercocarpus montanus	mountain mahogany	Rosaceae (rose family)								Yes	Yes		Yes		
Crataegus: hawthorns
	Crataegus berberifolia	big tree hawthorn	Rosaceae (rose family)		Yes		Yes	Yes								
	Crataegus crus-galli	cockspur hawthorn	Rosaceae (rose family)		Yes	Yes	Yes	Yes	Yes		Yes					51
	Crataegus marshallii	parsley hawthorn	Rosaceae (rose family)		Yes	Yes	Yes									
	Crataegus mollis	downy hawthorn	Rosaceae (rose family)		Yes	Yes	Yes	Yes	Yes		Yes					52
	Crataegus opaca	mayhaw	Rosaceae (rose family)		Yes											
	Crataegus spathulata	spatulate hawthorn	Rosaceae (rose family)		Yes	Yes	Yes	Yes								
	Crataegus texana	Texas hawthorn	Rosaceae (rose family)			Yes	Yes									
	Crataegus tracyi	Tracy hawthorn	Rosaceae (rose family)								Yes			Yes		
	Crataegus viridis	green hawthorn	Rosaceae (rose family)		Yes	Yes	Yes	Yes	Yes		Yes					
Eriobotrya: loquats
	Eriobotrya japonica	Japanese loquat	Rosaceae (rose family)	Yes											IUCN (LC)	
Malus: apples and crabapples
	Malus angustifolia	southern crab apple	Rosaceae (rose family)		Yes											662
	Malus ioensis var. texana	Texas crabapple	Rosaceae (rose family)								Yes					
Prunus: cherries, plums, peaches, apricots, almonds and cherry laurels
	Prunus americana	American plum	Rosaceae (rose family)		Yes						Yes	Yes			IUCN (LC)	766
	Prunus caroliniana	Carolina cherry laurel	Rosaceae (rose family)		Yes		Yes								IUCN (LC)	
	Prunus mexicana	Mexican plum	Rosaceae (rose family)		Yes	Yes	Yes	Yes	Yes		Yes					
	Prunus pensylvanica	pin cherry	Rosaceae (rose family)		Yes										IUCN (LC)	761
	Prunus serotina	black cherry	Rosaceae (rose family)		Yes		Yes			Yes	Yes			Yes	IUCN (LC)	762
	Prunus serotina var. eximia	escarpment black cherry	Rosaceae (rose family)													
	Prunus serotina var. rufula	southwestern choke cherry	Rosaceae (rose family)													
	Prunus umbellata	flatwoods plum	Rosaceae (rose family)		Yes	Yes	Yes	Yes		Yes	Yes			Yes		
	Prunus virginiana	common chokecherry	Rosaceae (rose family)		Yes											763
Rubiaceae: madder family
Cephalanthus: cephalanthus trees
	Cephalanthus occidentalis	button bush	Rubiaceae (madder family)		Yes	Yes	Yes	Yes	Yes	Yes	Yes	Yes	Yes	Yes	IUCN (LC)	
Rutaceae: citrus family
Amyris: torchwoods
	Amyris madrensis	Sierra Madre torchwood	Rutaceae (citrus family)							Yes						
Helietta: barettas
	Helietta parviflora	baretta	Rutaceae (citrus family)							Yes						
Poncirus: astringent oranges
	Poncirus trifoliata	trifoliate orange	Rutaceae (citrus family)	Yes											Texas (I)	
Ptelea: ptelea trees
	Ptelea trifoliata	wafer ash	Rutaceae (citrus family)		Yes		Yes	Yes	Yes		Yes			Yes	IUCN (LC)	
Zanthoxylum: prickly ashes
	Zanthoxylum clava-herculis	Hercules’ club	Rutaceae (citrus family)		Yes	Yes	Yes	Yes							IUCN (LC)	
	Zanthoxylum fagara	wild-lime prickly ash	Rutaceae (citrus family)			Yes				Yes					IUCN (LC)	
	Zanthoxylum hirsutum	Texas Hercules’ club	Rutaceae (citrus family)			Yes			Yes	Yes	Yes					
Oxalidaceae: willow family
Populus: poplars, cottonwoods, and aspens
	Populus deltoides	eastern cottonwood	Salicaceae (willow family)		Yes	Yes	Yes	Yes	Yes		Yes	Yes			IUCN (LC)	742
	Populus deltoides ssp. monilifera	plains cottonwood	Salicaceae (willow family)									Yes	Yes			745
	Populus fremontii var. mesetae	Arizona cottonwood	Salicaceae (willow family)											Yes		
	Populus tremuloides	quaking aspen	Salicaceae (willow family)											Yes		746
	Populus wislizenii	Rio Grande cottonwood	Salicaceae (willow family)											Yes		
Salix: willows
	Salix alba	white willow	Salicaceae (willow family)	Yes	Yes											927
	Salix amygdaloides	peachleaf willow	Salicaceae (willow family)		Yes											921
	Salix caroliniana	coastal plain willow	Salicaceae (willow family)												IUCN (LC)	925
	Salix nigra	black willow	Salicaceae (willow family)		Yes	Yes	Yes	Yes	Yes	Yes	Yes	Yes	Yes	Yes	IUCN (LC)	922
	Salix sepulcralis	weeping willow	Salicaceae (willow family)		Yes							Yes				929
	Salix taxifolia	yewleaf willow	Salicaceae (willow family)											Yes		
Xylosma: brushhollies
	Xylosma flexuosa	brushholly	Salicaceae (willow family)							Yes					IUCN (LC)	
Sapindaceae: soapberry family
Koelreuteria: koelreuteria trees
	Koelreuteria paniculata	goldenrain tree	Sapindaceae (soapberry family)	Yes												
Sapindus: soapberries
	Sapindus saponaria	western soapberry	Sapindaceae (soapberry family)		Yes	Yes	Yes	Yes	Yes	Yes	Yes	Yes	Yes	Yes		919
Ungnadia: Mexican buckeyes
	Ungnadia speciosa	Mexican buckeye	Sapindaceae (soapberry family)			Yes	Yes	Yes	Yes		Yes	Yes		Yes		
Sapotaceae: sapodilla family
Sideroxylon: bully trees
	Sideroxylon celastrinum	saffron plum	Sapotaceae (sapodilla family)			Yes				Yes	Yes					
	Sideroxylon lanuginosum	gum bumelia	Sapotaceae (sapodilla family)		Yes	Yes	Yes	Yes	Yes	Yes	Yes	Yes	Yes	Yes	IUCN (NT)	381
	Sideroxylon lycioides	buckthorn bully	Sapotaceae (sapodilla family)		Yes										IUCN (LC)	
Simaroubaceae: quassia family
Ailanthus: ailanthus trees
	Ailanthus altissima	tree of heaven	Simaroubaceae (quassia family)	Yes	Yes										Texas (I)	341
Leitneria:
	Leitneria floridana	corkwood	Simaroubaceae (quassia family)			Yes									IUCN (NT)	
Solanaceae: nightshade family
Nicotiana: tobacco
	Nicotiana glauca	tree tobacco	Solanaceae (nightshade family)	Yes												
Solanum: nightshades and potatoes
	Solanum erianthum	potato tree	Solanaceae (nightshade family)							Yes						
Sterculiaceae: sterculia family
Firmiana: parasol trees
	Firmiana simplex	Chinese parasol tree	Sterculiaceae (sterculia family)	Yes											Texas (I)	
Styracaceae: storax family
Halesia: silverbells
	Halesia carolina	Carolina silverbell	Styracaceae (storax family)		Yes	Yes									IUCN (LC)	581
	Halesia diptera	two wing silverbell	Styracaceae (storax family)		Yes	Yes									IUCN (LC)	582
Symplocaceae: sweetleaf family
Symplocos: sweetleaves
	Symplocos tinctoria	sweetleaf	Symplocaceae (sweetleaf family)		Yes										IUCN (LC)	
Tamaricaceae: tamarisk family
Tamarix: tamarisk trees
	Tamarix gallica	gallic tamarisk	Tamaricaceae (tamarisk family)	Yes											Texas (I)	
Tiliaceae: basswood family
Tilia: basswoods
	Tilia americana	American basswood	Tiliaceae (basswood family)		Yes										IUCN (LC)	951
	Tilia caroliniana	Carolina basswood	Tiliaceae (basswood family)		Yes		Yes				Yes					953
Ulmaceae: elm family
Planera: planera trees
	Planera aquatica	planertree	Ulmaceae (elm family)		Yes						Yes				IUCN (LC)	722
Ulmus: elms
	Ulmus alata	winged elm	Ulmaceae (elm family)		Yes	Yes	Yes	Yes	Yes	Yes					IUCN (LC)	971
	Ulmus americana	American elm	Ulmaceae (elm family)		Yes	Yes	Yes	Yes	Yes	Yes	Yes	Yes	Yes		IUCN (EN)	972
	Ulmus crassifolia	cedar elm	Ulmaceae (elm family)		Yes	Yes	Yes	Yes	Yes	Yes	Yes	Yes			IUCN (LC)	973
	Ulmus parvifolia	Chinese elm	Ulmaceae (elm family)	Yes												
	Ulmus pumila	Siberian elm	Ulmaceae (elm family)													974
	Ulmus rubra	slippery elm	Ulmaceae (elm family)		Yes		Yes	Yes	Yes	Yes	Yes	Yes			IUCN (LC)	975
	Ulmus serotina	September elm	Ulmaceae (elm family)		Yes										IUCN (LC)	976
	Ulmus thomasii	rock elm	Ulmaceae (elm family)		Yes											977
Verbenaceae: verbena family
Citharexylum: fiddlewoods
	Citharexylum berlandieri	Berlandier fiddlewood	Verbenaceae (verbena family)							Yes					IUCN (NT)	
Vitex: chaste trees
	Vitex agnus-castus	chaste tree	Verbenaceae (verbena family)	Yes												
Zygophyllaceae: caltrop family
Guaiacum: lignum-vitaes
	Guaiacum angustifolium	Texas lignum-vitae	Zygophyllaceae (caltrop family)							Yes	Yes			Yes	IUCN (LC)	

== See also ==
- List of invasive species in Texas
