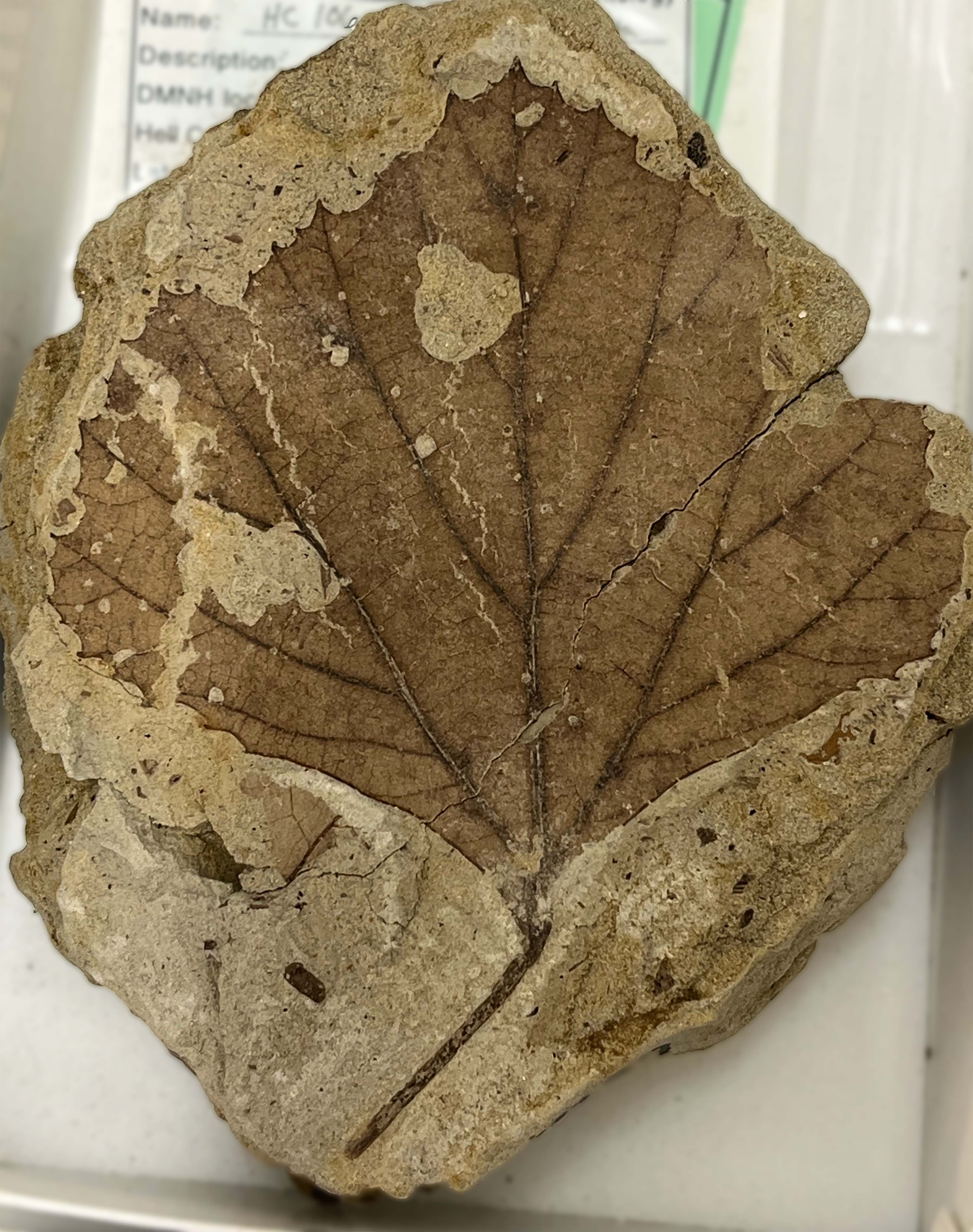
- A specimen of Platanites marginata from the Hell Creek Formation

Scientific classification
- Kingdom: Plantae
- Clade: Tracheophytes
- Clade: Angiosperms
- Clade: Eudicots
- Order: Proteales
- Family: Platanaceae
- Genus: †Platanites; Forbes ex Gardner 1851

Species
- †Platanites hebridicus; †Platanites marginatus; †Platanites montanus; †Platanites raynoldsii; †Platanites fremontensis; Species pending reassessment: †Platanites willigeri?

Synonyms
- Species synonymy: Negundo fremontensis

= Platanites =

Platanites Temporal range: Late Cretaceous to Eocene (Campanian-Priabonian), 83.6–33.9 Ma

Extinct genus of angiosperm

Platanites is a genus of extinct plane tree (sycamore) that existed during the Late Cretaceous as well as the Paleocene and Eocene. Fossils are known from North America and Europe.

== Description ==
The leaves of Platanites are said to be compound with three leaflets. The margins are serrated, with rounded sinuses between the teeth. The petiole is swollen at its base. The terminal leaflet is borne on a short stalk, while the lateral leaflets range from sessile to shortly stalked. Some leaf specimens exhibit an unusually elongated tip compared to other material. This difference is not regarded as evidence of a distinct taxon; rather, it is attributed to natural morphological variation within the species, possibly related to leaf position in the tree crown—a pattern also observed in living members of Platanaceae (making it rather common trait among plane trees). Platanites leaves show no evidence for evergreen adaptations. It was probably deciduous based on petiole morphology. Today, the only evergreen plane tree is Platanus (Casteneophyllum) kerrii with most other plane trees being deciduous.

== Distribution ==
Fossils are known from Scotland (such as in the Ardtun Leaf Beds), Montana (such as in the Hell Creek, Ravenscrag and Fort Union Formations), South Dakota (such as in the Hell Creek Formation), North Dakota (such as in the Hell Creek and Fox Hills Formations), Utah (such as in the Green River Formation), New Mexico (such as in the Nacimiento and Ojo Alamo Formations), Wyoming (such as in the Eagle and Aycross Formations), Oregon (such as in the Clarno Formation) and Colorado (such as in the Denver and Green River Formations). A possible species is known from Poland.

== Extinction ==
While common place during the Cretacoues and Paleocene, Platanites went extinct during the Eocene. Western North America appears to have been the final refuge of Platanites, where the genus persisted only in a few lake settings of the Pacific Northwest and southern Rocky Mountains. No occurrences are currently known from Oligocene or Neogene deposits, implying that the lineage either vanished from the region or became fully extinct near the Eocene–Oligocene boundary. This timing coincides with the global transition from a warmhouse climate to a prolonged coolhouse state.
