= Phyllonorycter splendidus =

Scientific classification
- Kingdom: Animalia
- Phylum: Arthropoda
- Class: Insecta
- Order: Lepidoptera
- Family: Gracillariidae
- Genus: Phyllonorycter
- Species: P. splendidus

Binomial name
- Phyllonorycter splendidus Deschka, 2013

Species of moth

Phyllonorycter splendidus is a moth of the family Gracillariidae. It is known from Mexico.

The larvae feed on Platanus lindeniana and Platanus mexicana. They mine the leaves of their host plant.
