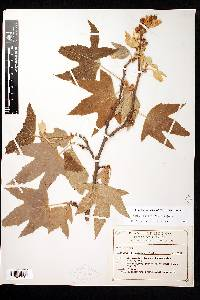

Conservation status
- Vulnerable (IUCN 3.1)

Scientific classification
- Kingdom: Plantae
- Clade: Tracheophytes
- Clade: Angiosperms
- Clade: Eudicots
- Order: Proteales
- Family: Platanaceae
- Genus: Platanus
- Species: P. gentryi

Binomial name
- Platanus gentryi Nixon ex. J.M.Poole

= Platanus gentryi =

Species of tree

Platanus gentryi, commonly known as Gentry's plane tree, Gentry's sycamore, Sicómoro de la Sierra, or the mountain sycamore, is a species of Platanus in the family Platanaceae. It was described by Kevin C. Nixon and Jackie M. Poole in 2003. The species is endemic to northwestern Mexico, primarily the states of Chihuahua, Sinaloa, and Sonora, at general elevations of 650–1,500 m, where it grows in semi-arid, dry conditions. It is currently listed as "Vulnerable" by the IUCN Red List, for the logging industry has been over-exploiting the species profitable lumber.
