= Platanus palmeri =

Scientific classification
- Kingdom: Plantae
- Clade: Tracheophytes
- Clade: Angiosperms
- Clade: Eudicots
- Order: Proteales
- Family: Platanaceae
- Genus: Platanus
- Species: P. palmeri

Binomial name
- Platanus palmeri Kuntze

Synonyms
- List: Platanus occidentalis var. palmeri

Species of flowering plant

Platanus palmeri is a species of flowering plant native to the southern United States (Texas) and northern Mexico (Coahuila). It was once thought to be a variety or at least a subspecies of Platanus occidentalis in some cases, but a review of modern plane tree genetics has confirmed its classification as a distinct species.

== Habitat ==
The tree grows in subtropical conditions.
