= Commerce (disambiguation) =

Commerce is a branch of economics that deals with trade and exchange of goods and services at any stage between a producer and a consumer.

Commerce may also refer to:

== Places ==
- Commerce (river), in Normandy, France

=== United States ===
- Commerce, California
  - Commerce Casino, located there
- Commerce City, Colorado
- Commerce, Georgia
- Commerce, Illinois, former name of Nauvoo, Illinois
- Commerce, Missouri
- Commerce, Oklahoma
- Commerce, Texas
- Commerce Township, Michigan
- Commerce Township, Scott County, Missouri

== Other uses ==
- Commerce (card game), an 18th-century French gambling card game
- Commerce station (Paris Metro), a railway station in Paris, France
- Commerce (ship), one of several merchant vessels by that name
- United States Department of Commerce, the Cabinet department of the United States government concerned with promoting economic growth
- The Glory of Commerce, public sculpture at Grand Central Terminal, in New York City
