= Platanus lindeniana =

Scientific classification
- Kingdom: Plantae
- Clade: Tracheophytes
- Clade: Angiosperms
- Clade: Eudicots
- Order: Proteales
- Family: Platanaceae
- Genus: Platanus
- Species: P. lindeniana

Binomial name
- Platanus lindeniana M.Martens & Galeotti (1843)

Synonyms
- Platanus occidentalis var. lindeniana (Martens & Galeotti) Jaennicke; Platanus chiapensis Standl.; Platanus mexicana var. peltata Jaennicke; Platanus oaxacana Standl.

Species of tree

Platanus lindeniana, commonly known as Linden's plane tree, or Linden's sycamore, is a species of Platanus in the family Platanaceae. It was described by Martin Martens and Henri Guillaume Galeotti in 1843. The species is endemic to parts of east-central Mexico down to parts of Guatemala, where it grows in semi-arid to temperate climates.
