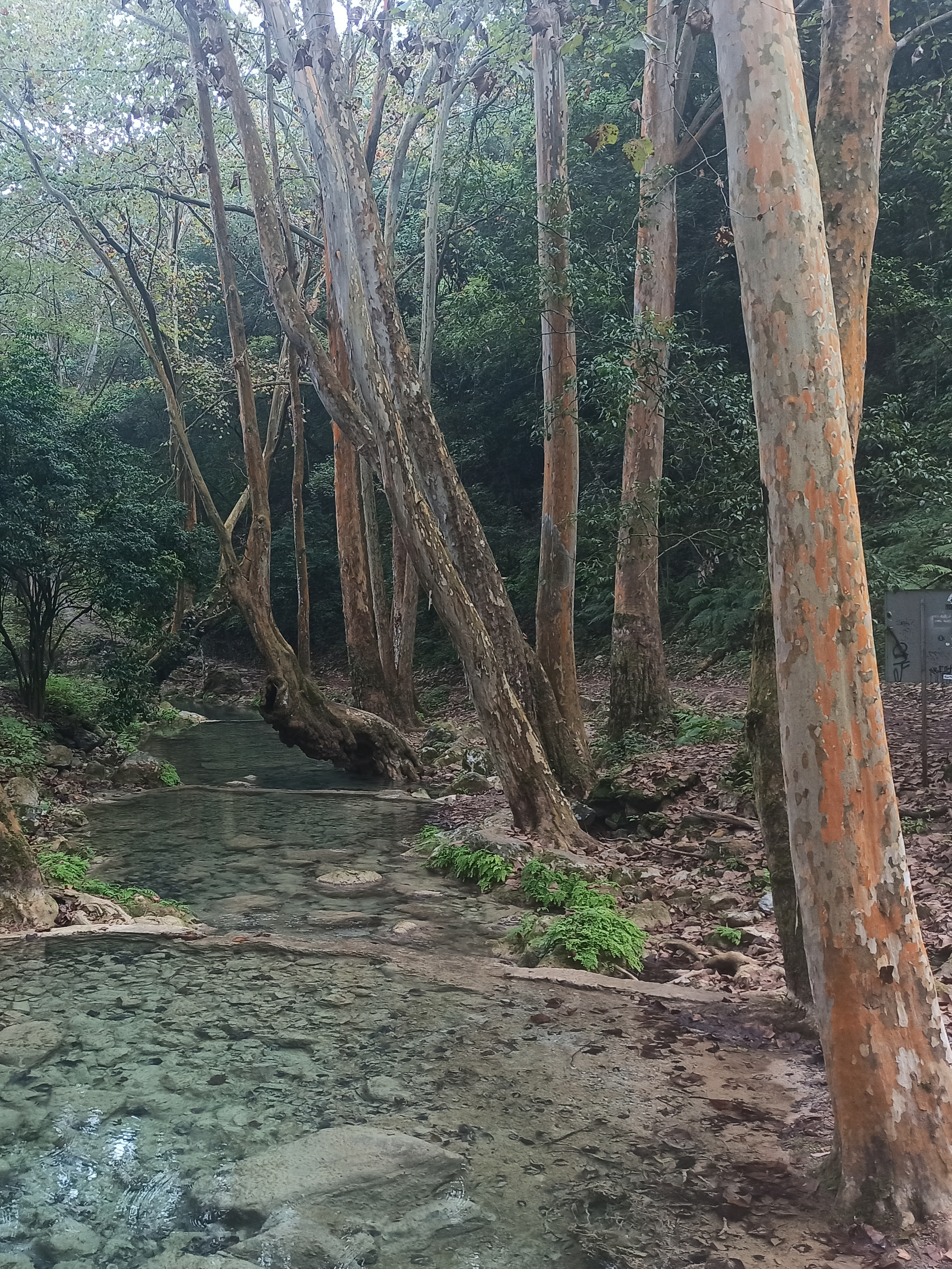

Scientific classification
- Kingdom: Plantae
- Clade: Embryophytes
- Clade: Tracheophytes
- Clade: Spermatophytes
- Clade: Angiosperms
- Clade: Eudicots
- Order: Proteales
- Family: Platanaceae
- Genus: Platanus
- Species: P. mexicana

Binomial name
- Platanus mexicana Moric.

= Platanus mexicana =

Species of plane tree

Platanus mexicana is a species of plane tree that is native to Northeast and Central Mexico and Guatemala. It is also known as the Mexican sycamore.

== Description ==
The tree can grow as high as 80 feet (24 m) and has leaves that can be up to 8 inches (200 mm) wide. It is a deciduous tree with leaves that turn a yellowish brown in autumn. The leaves have five lobes that can grow up to 8 inches wide. When mature, Mexican sycamore can be identified by the coloration of its leaves relative to other sycamore species such as the American sycamore, though range overlap is almost entirely exclusive. The adaxial surfaces tend to have a darker waxy cuticle, the abaxial surfaces tend to be noticeably lighter with a fine carpeting of soft white hairs.
