= Commerce Township, Scott County, Missouri =

Inactive township in Missouri, U.S.

Coordinates: 37.1169°N 89.4508°W

Commerce Township is an inactive township in Scott County, in the U.S. state of Missouri.

Commerce Township was erected in 1822, taking its name from the community of Commerce, Missouri.
