= Platanus kerrii =

Conservation status
- Vulnerable (IUCN 2.3)

Scientific classification
- Kingdom: Plantae
- Clade: Embryophytes
- Clade: Tracheophytes
- Clade: Spermatophytes
- Clade: Angiosperms
- Clade: Eudicots
- Order: Proteales
- Family: Platanaceae
- Genus: Platanus
- Species: P. kerrii

Binomial name
- Platanus kerrii Gagnep.

Species of tree

Platanus kerrii (Kerr's plane) is a rare and distinctive species of plane tree (sycamore) native to the subtropical and tropical forests of Vietnam and Laos in Southeast Asia. It is the only extant member of the subgenus Castaneophyllum, and is the sister group to all other lineages within Platanus. Unlike all other plane trees, P. kerrii is evergreen and retains unlobed leaves throughout its adult life, with none developing the lobed form characteristic of other Platanus species. While some have speculated that P. kerrii might represent a living analogue of ancestral plane trees, no fossil material clearly displaying its distinctive morphology (such as its pollen morphology) has been found. Even its distinctive leaf form, once thought to reflect a primitive condition linking it to Cretaceous ancestors, is now understood as a derived feature rather than evidence of direct ancestry from early Platanus-like forms.

== Taxonomy ==
It is placed in its own subgenus Casteneophyllum, and it has been proposed that this species should be separated out into its own genus. The plant is named after Arthur Kerr, who collected the type specimen in Laos in 1932.

== Description ==
Platanus kerrii is native to Laos and Vietnam, where it is called "ma nang" or "chò nước" in Vietnamese. It differs from other species in the genus in being a tropical plant, evergreen, having unlobed leaves, and in the leaf stem not enclosing the axillary bud at its base. The bark flakes off as with other species, and the trunk of a mature tree appears similar to that of the other species. The leaves are elliptical to lanceolate. The fruits are borne in globose heads, each of which is sessile on a long peduncle. There are up to 12 heads on a peduncle.
