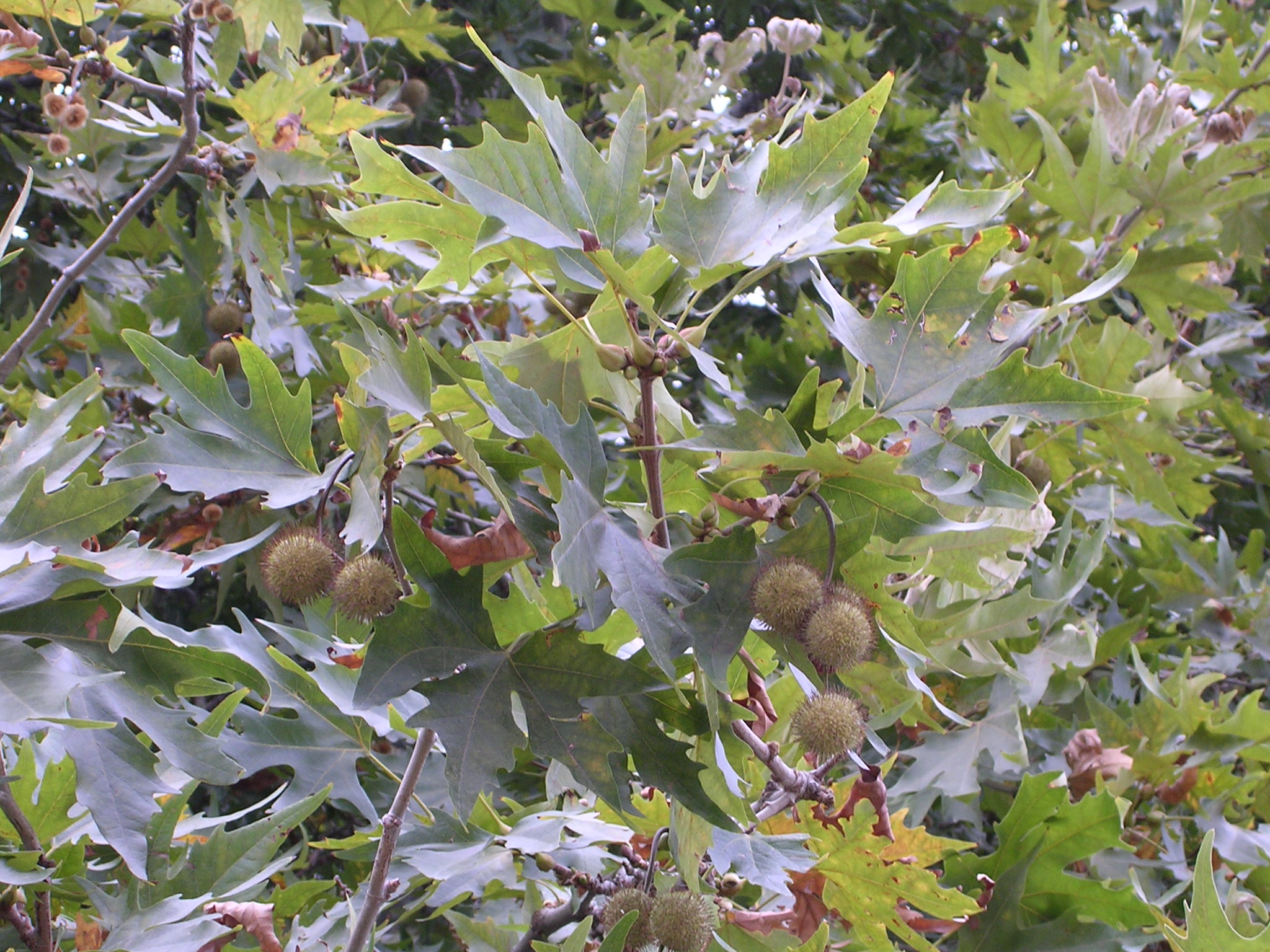
- Leaves and fruit of an Oriental plane

Scientific classification
- Kingdom: Plantae
- Clade: Tracheophytes
- Clade: Angiosperms
- Clade: Eudicots
- Order: Proteales
- Family: Platanaceae
- Genus: Platanus; L.

Species
- See text

= Platanus =

Platanus Temporal range: Late Cretaceous-Recent (Santonian-Holocene), 85.7–0 Ma

Genus of flowering plants constituting the family Platanaceae

Platanus (/ˈplætənəs/ PLAT-ən-əss) is a genus consisting of a small number of tree species. They are the sole living members of the family Platanaceae.

All mature members of Platanus are tall, reaching 30–50 m (98–164 ft) in height. The type species of the genus is the Oriental plane Platanus orientalis. All except for P. kerrii are deciduous, and most are found in riparian or other wetland habitats in the wild, though proving drought-tolerant in cultivation. The hybrid London plane (Platanus × hispanica) has proved particularly tolerant of urban conditions, and has been widely planted in London and elsewhere across the temperate world.

== Name ==
They are often known in English as planes or plane trees. Formerly, they were sometimes called plantain tree (not to be confused with other, unrelated, species with the name). Some North American species are called sycamores (especially Platanus occidentalis), although the term is also used for several unrelated species of trees.

The term plane derives from the Old French plane, attested from c. 14th century, which in turn derives from Latin platanus, borrowed from the Greek plátanos (πλάτανος). The Greek name may be related to the root platýs (πλατύς 'broad'), referring to the tree’s broad leaves or flat bark, itself from Proto-Indo-European plat- (“broad, flat”).

== Botany ==
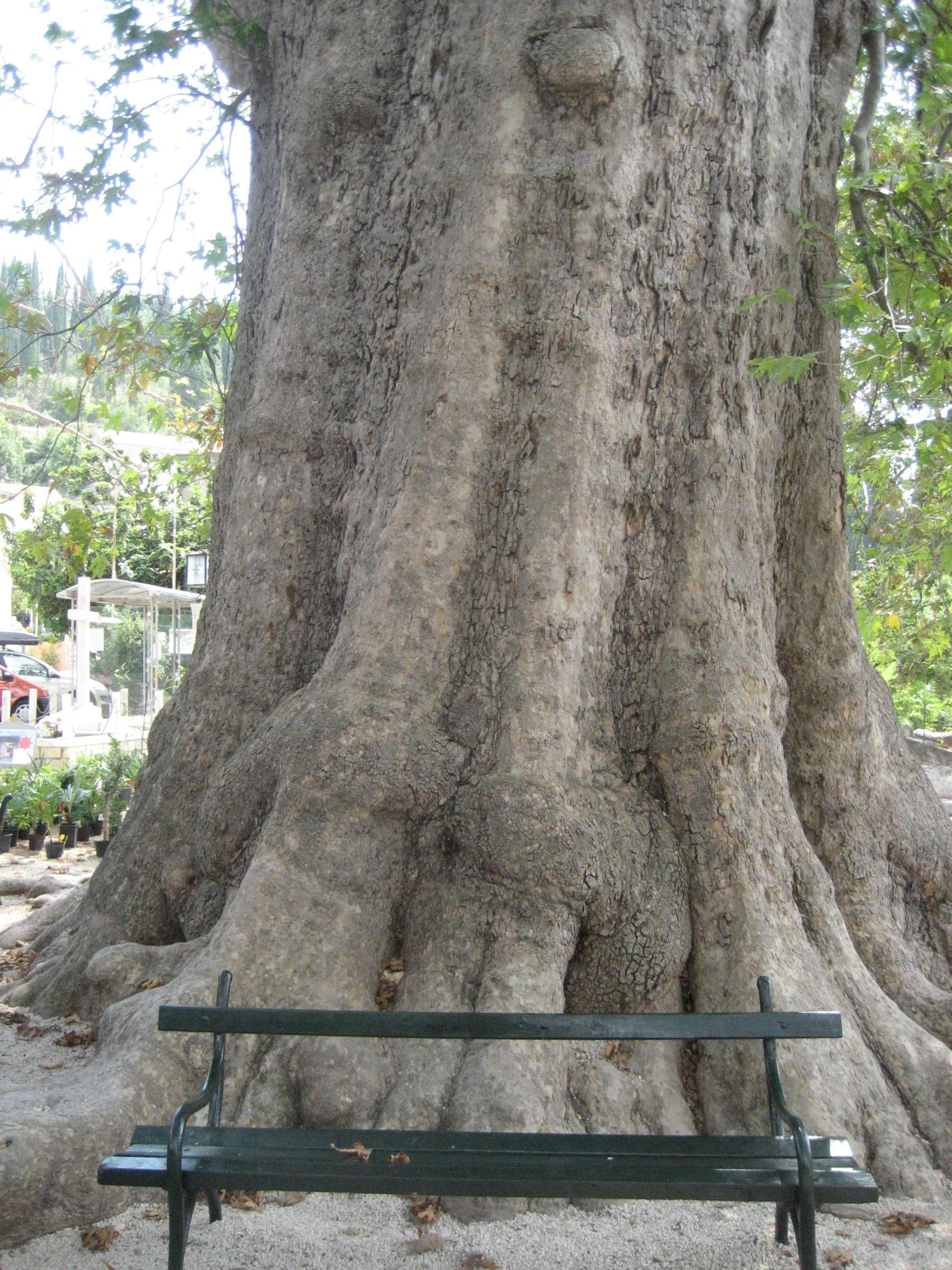
Trunk of an aged Platanus orientalis, in Trsteno, near Dubrovnik, Croatia

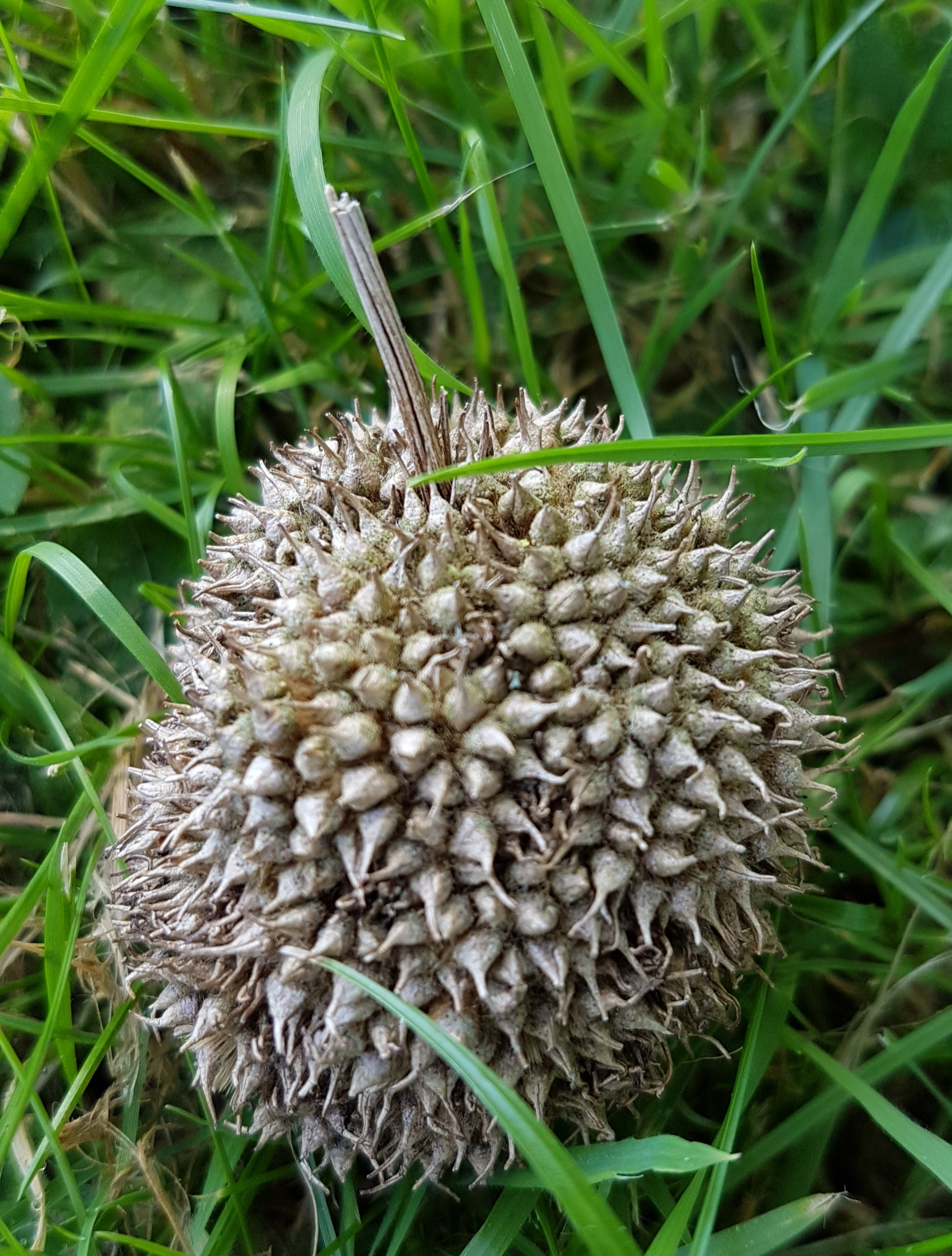
Ripe plane tree fruit

The flowers are reduced and are borne in balls (globose heads); 3–7 hairy sepals may be fused at the base, and the petals are 3–7 and are spatulate. Male and female flowers are separate, but borne on the same plant (monoecious). The number of heads in one cluster (inflorescence) is indicative of the species (see table below). The male flower has 3–8 stamens; the female has a superior ovary with 3–7 carpels. Plane trees are wind-pollinated. Male flower-heads fall off after shedding their pollen.

After being pollinated, the female flowers become achenes that form an aggregate ball. The fruit is a multiple of achenes (plant systematics, Simpson M. G., 2006). Typically, the core of the ball is 1 cm in diameter and is covered with a net of mesh 1 mm, which can be peeled off. The ball is 2.5–4 cm in diameter and contains several hundred achenes, each of which has a single seed and is conical, with the point attached downward to the net at the surface of the ball. There is also a tuft of many thin stiff yellow-green bristle fibers attached to the base of each achene. These bristles help in wind dispersion of the fruits as in the dandelion.

The leaves are simple and alternate. In the subgenus Platanus they have a palmate outline. The base of the leaf stalk (petiole) is enlarged and completely wraps around the young stem bud in its axil. The axillary bud is exposed only after the leaf falls off.

The mature bark peels off or exfoliates easily in irregularly shaped patches, producing a mottled, scaly appearance. On old trunks, bark may not flake off, but thickens and cracks instead.

== Phylogeny ==
There are two subgenera, subgenus Castaneophyllum containing the anomalous P. kerrii, and subgenus Platanus, with all the others; recent studies in Mexico have increased the number of accepted species in this subgenus. Within subgenus Platanus, evidence from both chloroplast and nuclear gene sequences suggests that the P. racemosa species complex in Western North America (including P. racemosa, P. gentryi, P. wrightii) is more closely related to the Eurasian P. orientalis than it is to the other North American species (P. mexicana sensu lato, including up to four species: P. chiapaensis, P. lindeniana, P. [×] mexicana sensu stricto, P. oaxacana; P. occidentalis s.l. with two [sub]species: P. occidentalis, P. palmeri; P. rzedowskii). The two groups form genetically and morphologically distinct evolutionary lineages (sister clades), informally called the “ANA clade” (Atlantic North American lineage) and “PNA-E clade” (Pacific North American-European lineage). Both lineages have been affected by reticulate evolutionary processes in the past (ancient or recent hybridization and introgression):

- Platanus palmeri (= P. occidentalis var. palmeri) – forming the southwesternmost populations of P. occidentalis s.l. – carries nuclear intron sequences (second intron of the Leafy gene) of PNA-E origin. It lacks the plastid haplotype specific for the northeastern populations (P. occidentalis s.str.)
- The internal transcribed spacers of the nuclear-encoded rRNA genes of P. occidentalis s.l. and P. rzedowskii include ANA-specific variants with functional 5.8S rDNA as well as PNA-E-specific variants showing signs of pseudogeny. The latter are shared with P. gentryi, the PNA-E species closest to the ANA clade area and the northern/ interior populations of P. mexicana s.l. This indicates that already the common ancestor of P. rzedowskii and P. occidentalis s.l. had been in contact with a member of the PNA-E clade.
- Likewise, P. rzedowskii from Nuevo León is a genetic mosaic, and may have originated from earlier hybridization within the ANA clade, between southernmost P. occidentalis s.l. (P. palmeri) and P. mexicana s.l., or their ancestors. Today the ranges of P. occidentalis s.l. and P. mexicana s.l. are mutually exclusive. Platanus rzedowskii is geographically and morphologically intermediate between P. occidentalis s.l. and P. mexicana s.l.
- Morphological reinvestigation including the originally collected material revealed that the interior populations of P. mexicana (northern Querétaro and northern Hidalgo; P. mexicana var. interior according Nixon & Poole) mark the hybrid zone between P. rzedowskii and P. mexicana s.l. and the (former) contact zone to the species of the PNA-E clade (P. gentryi, P. wrightii). Since the holotype of P. mexicana is from this zone and shows the characteristical intermediate morphology, P. mexicana s.str. would represent a nothospecies: P. × mexicana. The remaining populations of P. mexicana s.l., P. lindeniana, show no sign of introgression from either P. rzedowskii, P. occidentalis-palmeri or the Western North American species (P. racemosa species aggregate), with the exception of one heterozygotic P. oaxacana population from northcentral Oaxaca.

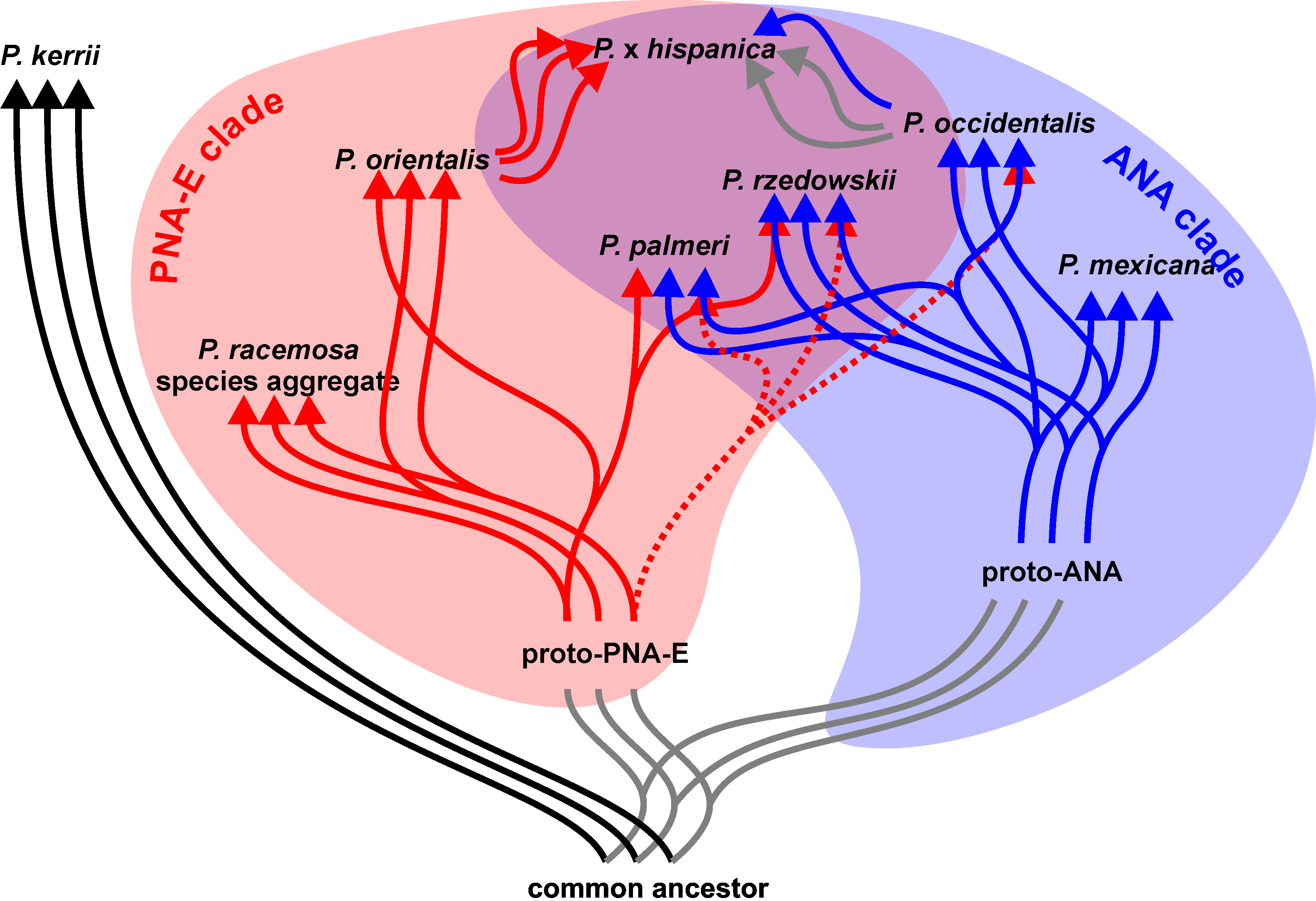
Sorting and evolutionary history of three different noncoding nuclear loci contributing to the gene pool of modern-day species of Platanus (after)

The genus Platanus exemplarily illustrates the concept of a Coral of Life, a species network. Its modern-day species are not only the product of evolutionary dichotomies (cladogenesis), the splitting of an ancestral lineage into two (Tree of Life metaphor) but also evolutionary anastomoses: hybridization and introgression.

The fossil record of leaves and fruit identifiable to Platanus begins in the Paleocene. Despite the geographic separation between North America and Old World, species from these continents will cross readily resulting in fertile hybrids such as the London plane, which is an anthropogenic hybrid (cultivar) between the North American P. occidentalis sensu stricto (ANA clade) and the Mediterranean P. orientalis (PNA-E clade). Widely used as a park tree across the Northern Hemisphere, it frequently backcrosses with both its parents.

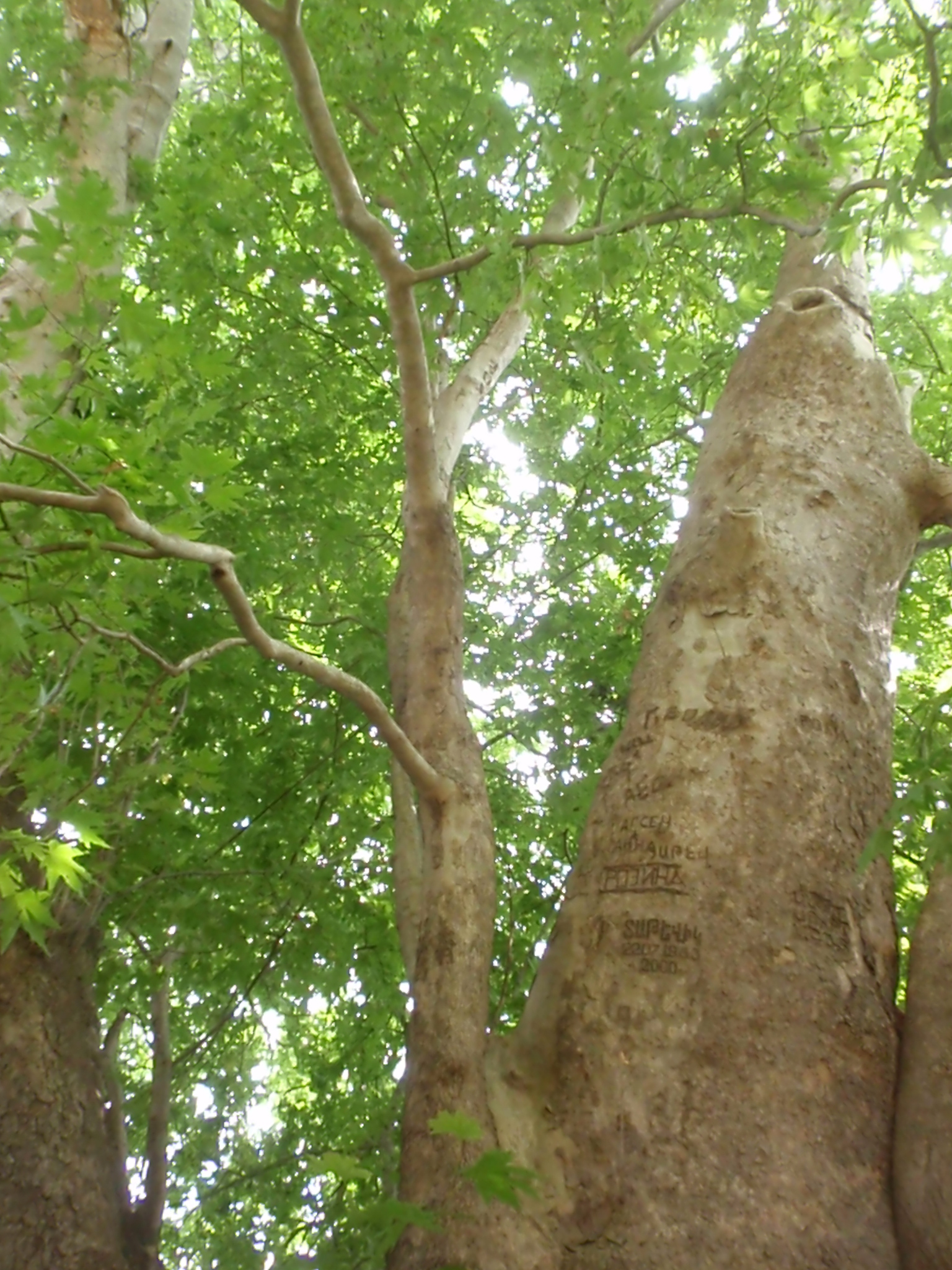
The 2045–2046-year-old Platanus orientalis tree Tnjri in Nagorno-Karabakh.

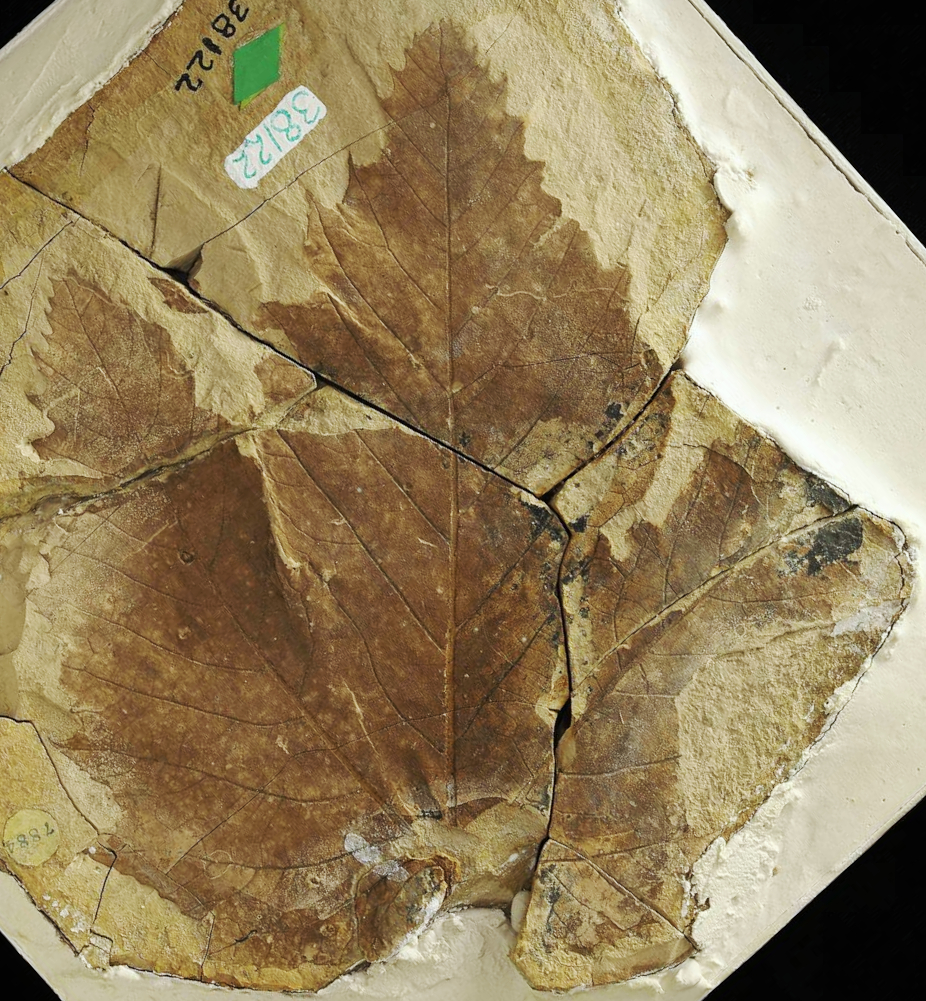
Miocene Platanus dissecta leaf, Latah Formation

== Species ==
The following are named species of Platanus; not all are accepted by all authorities:

Botanical name	Common names	Distribution and taxonomic notes	Flowerheads	Systematics
Platanus chiapensis Standl. IPNI	Chiapas plane	Mexico (Chiapas); part of P. mexicana species aggregate, probably a junior synonym of P. lindeniana	2–7	Subgenus Platanus, ANA clade
Platanus gentryi Nixon & J.M.Poole IPNI	Gentry's plane	Mexico (tripoint area of Chihuahua, Sinaloa and Sonora); part of the P. racemosa species aggregate	?	Subgenus Platanus, PNA-E clade
Platanus kerrii Gagnep.	Kerr's plane	Laos, Vietnam	10–12	Subgenus Castaneophyllum J.-F.Leroy
Platanus mexicana Moric. sensu lato	Mexican sycamore, Mexican plane	Mexico, Guatemala; in a strict sense synonymous with P. mexicana var. interior Nixon & Poole, restricted to Guanajuato, Hidalgo, Querétaro and San Luis Potosí, and of hybrid origin	s.l.: 1–7; s.str: 1–3	Subgenus Platanus, ANA clade
Platanus lindeniana M.Martens & Galeotti IPNI syn Platanus occidentalis var. lindeniana	Linden's plane tree, Linden's sycamore	Mexico (Chiapas, Hidalgo, Puebla, Oaxaca, Veracruz), Guatemala; part of the P. mexicana species aggregate, synonymous with P. mexicana var. mexicana according Nixon & Poole	(1–)2–5(–7)	Subgenus Platanus, ANA clade
Platanus oaxacana Standl.	Oaxaca plane	Mexico (Oaxaca); part of the P. mexicana species aggregate, junior synonym of P. lindeniana or distinct species	2–4	Subgenus Platanus, ANA clade
Platanus occidentalis L.	American sycamore, American plane, buttonwood, occidental plane, water beech	Canada (Ontario), United States	1–2	Subgenus Platanus, ANA clade
Platanus palmeri (Kuntze) ined.	Plateau sycamore, Palmer's sycamore	Mexico (Coahuila) and United States (Texas)	1–2	Subgenus Platanus, ANA clade
Platanus rzedowskii Nixon & J.M.Poole IPNI	Rzedowski's plane, Rzedowskii's sycamore	Mexico (Nuevo León, San Luis Potosí, Tamaulipas)	1–2	Subgenus Platanus, ANA clade
Platanus orientalis L.	Oriental plane	Eurasia	3–6	Subgenus Platanus, PNA-E clade
Platanus racemosa Nutt.	California sycamore, western sycamore, aliso	United States (California), Mexico (Baja California)	3–7	Subgenus Platanus, PNA-E clade
Platanus wrightii S.Watson	Arizona sycamore	United States (Arizona, New Mexico), Mexico (Sonora, Chihuahua); part of the P. racemosa species aggregate	2–4	Subgenus Platanus, PNA-E clade
Platanus × hispanica Mill. ex Muenchh. (syn. P. × acerifolia (Aiton) Willd., P. hybrida Brot.)	London plane, hybrid plane	Worldwide, cultivated origin; hybrid of P. occidentalis and P. orientalis	1–4(–6)	Subgenus Platanus; interlineage hybrid

== Diseases ==
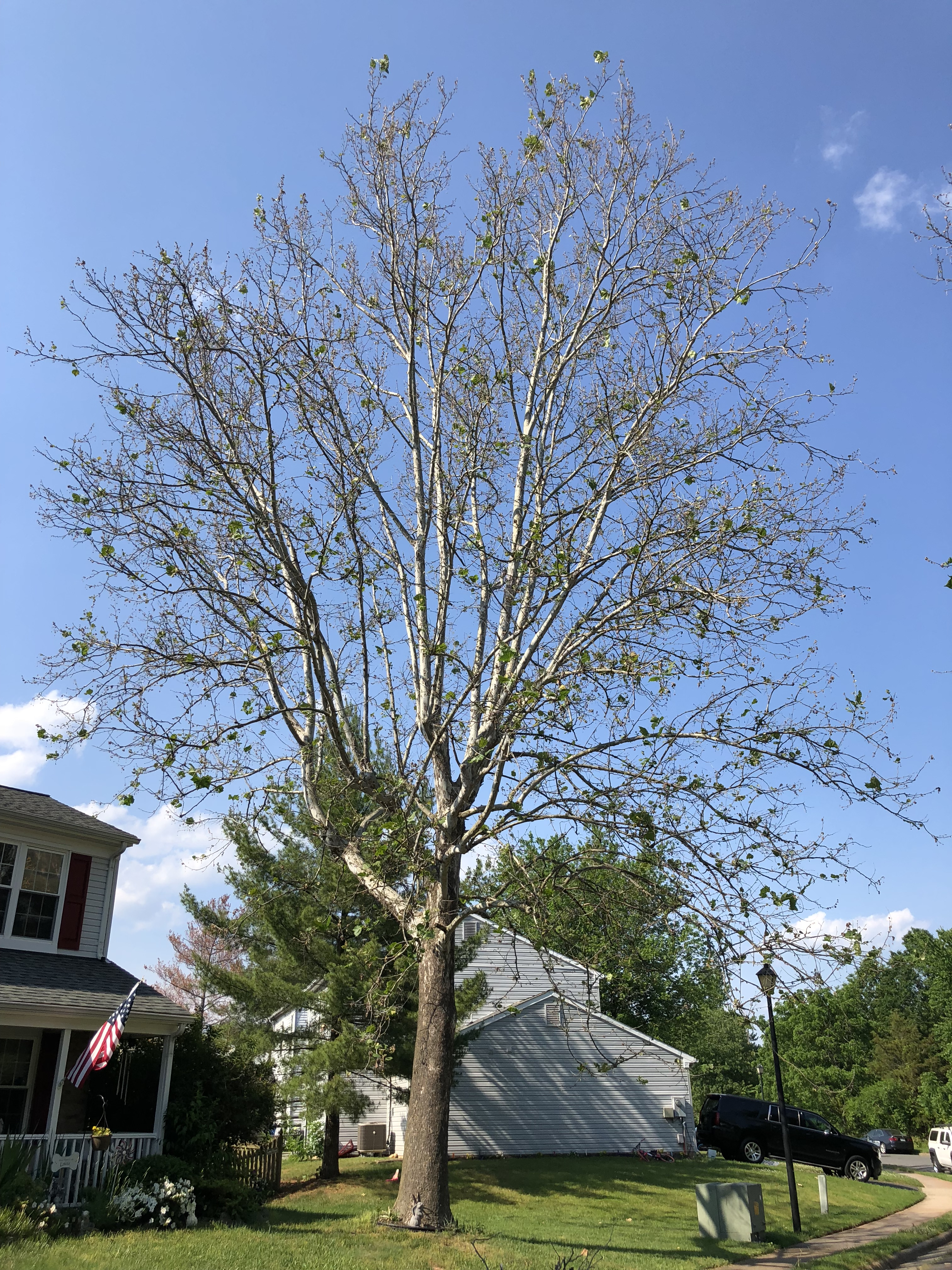
Severe infections of anthracnose can sometimes defoliate large swaths of American sycamore forest during mid and late spring, but trees generally recover by mid-summer

Planes are susceptible to plane anthracnose (Apiognomonia veneta), a fungal disease that can defoliate the trees in some years. The most severe infections are associated with cold, wet spring weather. P. occidentalis and the other American species are the most susceptible, with P. orientalis the most resistant. The hybrid London plane is intermediate in resistance.

Ceratocystis platani, a wilt disease, has become a significant problem in recent years in much of Europe. The North American species are mostly resistant to the disease, with which they probably coevolved, while the Old World species are highly sensitive.

Other diseases such as powdery mildew occur frequently, but are of lesser importance.

Platanus species are used as food plants by the larvae of some Lepidoptera species including Phyllonorycter platani and Setaceous Hebrew Character.

In the 21st century a disease, commonly known as Massaria disease, has attacked plane trees across Europe. It is caused by the fungus Splanchnonema platani, and causes large lesions on the upper sides of branches.

== Effects on humans ==
There have been cases of "platanus cough", symptoms of shortness of breath, coughing, and irritated eyes, which may affect several people in a place, and have led to initial suspicion of an attack with an irritant gas. After one such mass attack which affected schoolchildren in classrooms with open windows densely surrounded by plane trees, children had to be admitted to hospital, where they were treated and recovered without ill effects. It was found that the symptoms were due to the fine star-shaped trichomes (hairs) on all parts of platanus trees, which are broken off by strong wind after a prolonged dry period. The dust created causes direct irritation and scratchiness in the eyes, throat, and nose, but not the runny nose and itching eyes and nose caused by an allergy. The school incident took place after a dry period, with a fairly high temperature of 29 °C (84 °F), and wind blowing at 50 km/h (31 mph).

Protection against platanus cough is provided by avoiding contact and wearing protective glasses and masks under weather conditions promoting release of trichomes. When cleaning in an urban environment, sweeping up fallen leaves and branches can release hairs; cleaning by suction is preferred. It is not recommended that trees in cities be felled, as they are beneficial; in particular the platanus trichomes act as biofilters for air pollutants. Where there are urban concentrations presenting a risk, seasonal spraying of trees with a solution of apple pectin can prevent the star hair from breaking off.

== Uses ==
The principal use of these trees is as ornamental trees, especially in urban areas and by roadsides. The London plane is particularly popular for this purpose. The American plane is cultivated sometimes for timber and investigations have been made into its use as a biomass crop. The oriental plane is widely used as an ornamental tree, and also has a number of minor medicinal uses.

== Cultural history ==
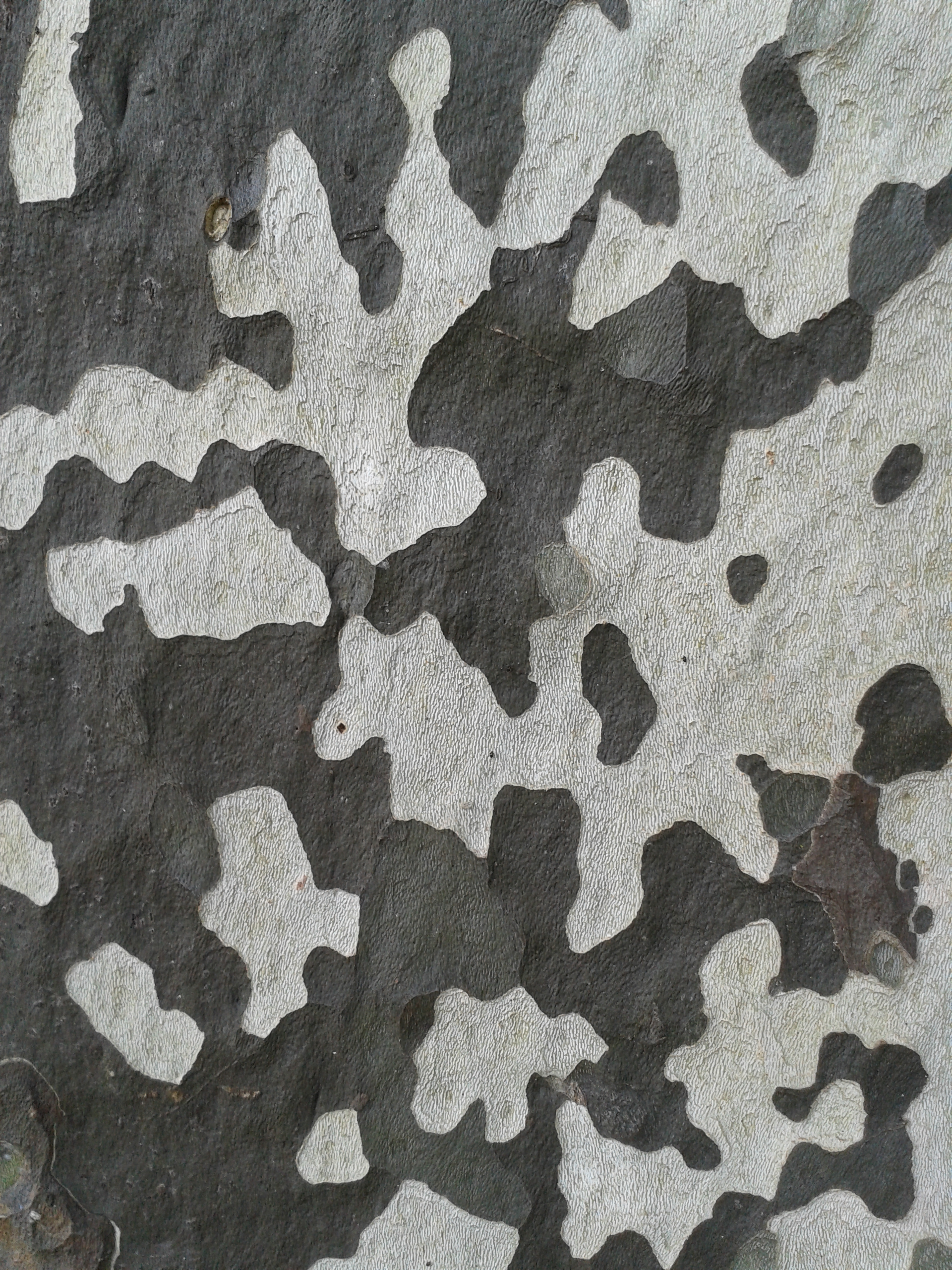
Patterned bark of London plane

Most significant aspects of cultural history apply to Platanus orientalis in the Old World. The tree is an important part of the literary scenery of Plato's dialogue Phaedrus. Because of Plato, the tree also played an important role in the scenery of Cicero's De Oratore. The trees also provided the shade under which Aristotle and Plato's famed philosophical schools were held. Handel's opera Serse has a famous aria, "Ombra mai fu", which the title character sings in praise of his favorite plane tree.

The plane tree has been a frequent motif featured in Classical Chinese poetry as an embodiment of sorrowful sentiments due to its autumnal shedding of leaves.

The legendary Dry Tree first recorded by Marco Polo was possibly a platanus. According to the legend, it marked the site of the battle between Alexander the Great and Darius III.

The German camouflage pattern Platanenmuster ("plane tree pattern"), designed in 1937–1942 by Johann Georg Otto Schick, was the first dotted camouflage pattern.
