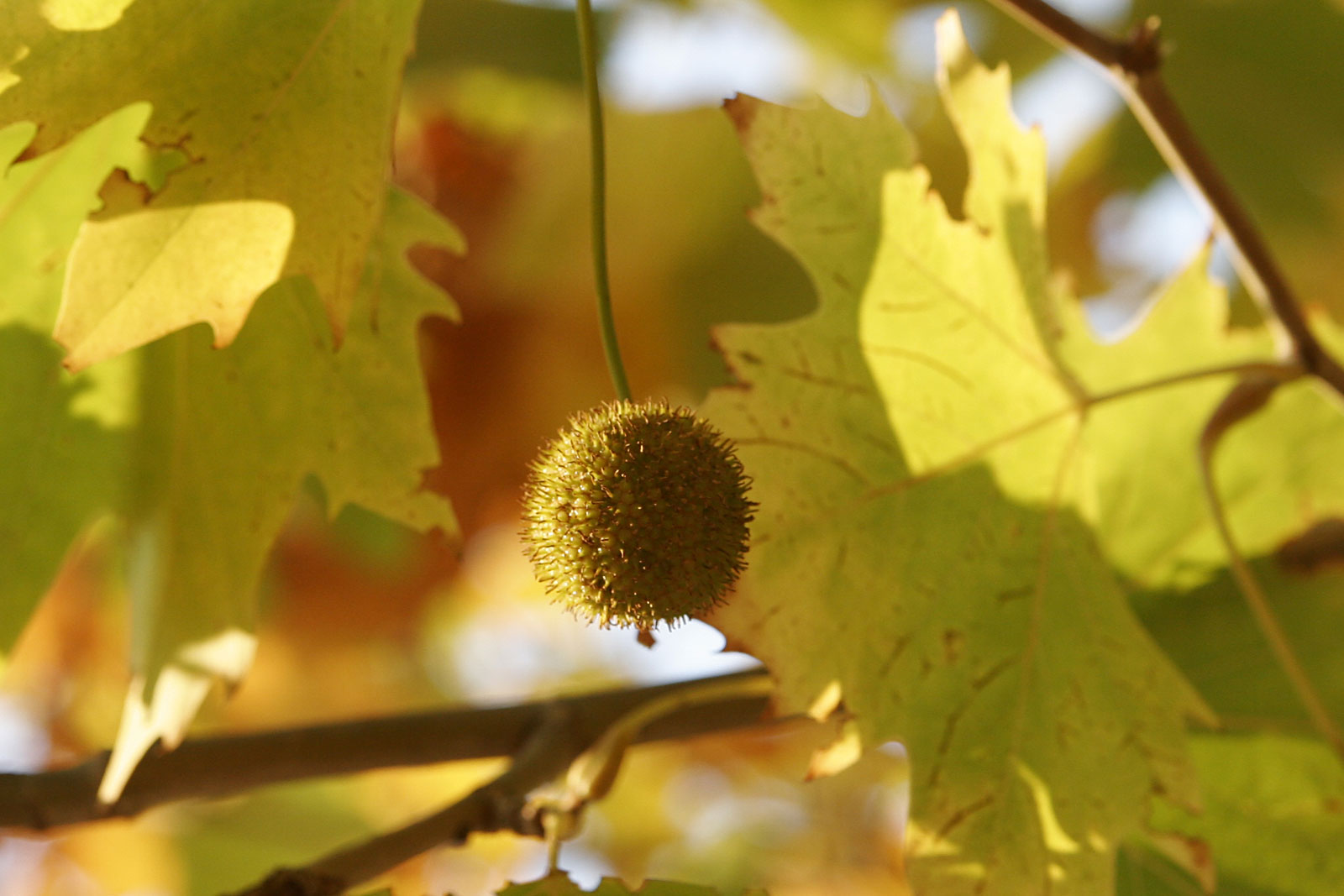
- Inflorescence of Platanus × hispanica

Scientific classification
- Kingdom: Plantae
- Clade: Tracheophytes
- Clade: Angiosperms
- Clade: Eudicots
- Order: Proteales
- Family: Platanaceae; T. Lestib.

Type genus
- Platanus L., 1753

Other genera
- †Ambiplatanus (Mindell, Karafit & Stockey, 2014); †Chemurnautia Maslova, 2002; †Credneria Zenker, 1833; †Ettingshausenia (Stiehler, 1857); †Langeranthus Huegele & Manchester, 2022; †Langeria Wolfe & Wehr, 1987; †Macginicarpa Manchester, 1986; †Macginitiea Wolfe & Wehr, 1987; †Plataninium (Unger, 1842); †Platananthus Manchester, 1986; †Platanites Forbes ex Gardner 1887; †Platimeliphyllum Maslova, 2002; †Pseudoprotophyllum Hollick, 1930; †Sapindopsis (Fontaine) Dilcher & Basson 1990

= Platanaceae =

Platanaceae Temporal range: Albian - recent

Family of flowering plants

Platanaceae, the plane family, is a family of flowering plants in the order Proteales. The family consists of only a single extant genus Platanus, with twelve known species. The plants are tall trees, native to temperate and subtropical regions of the Northern Hemisphere. The hybrid London plane is widely planted in cities worldwide.

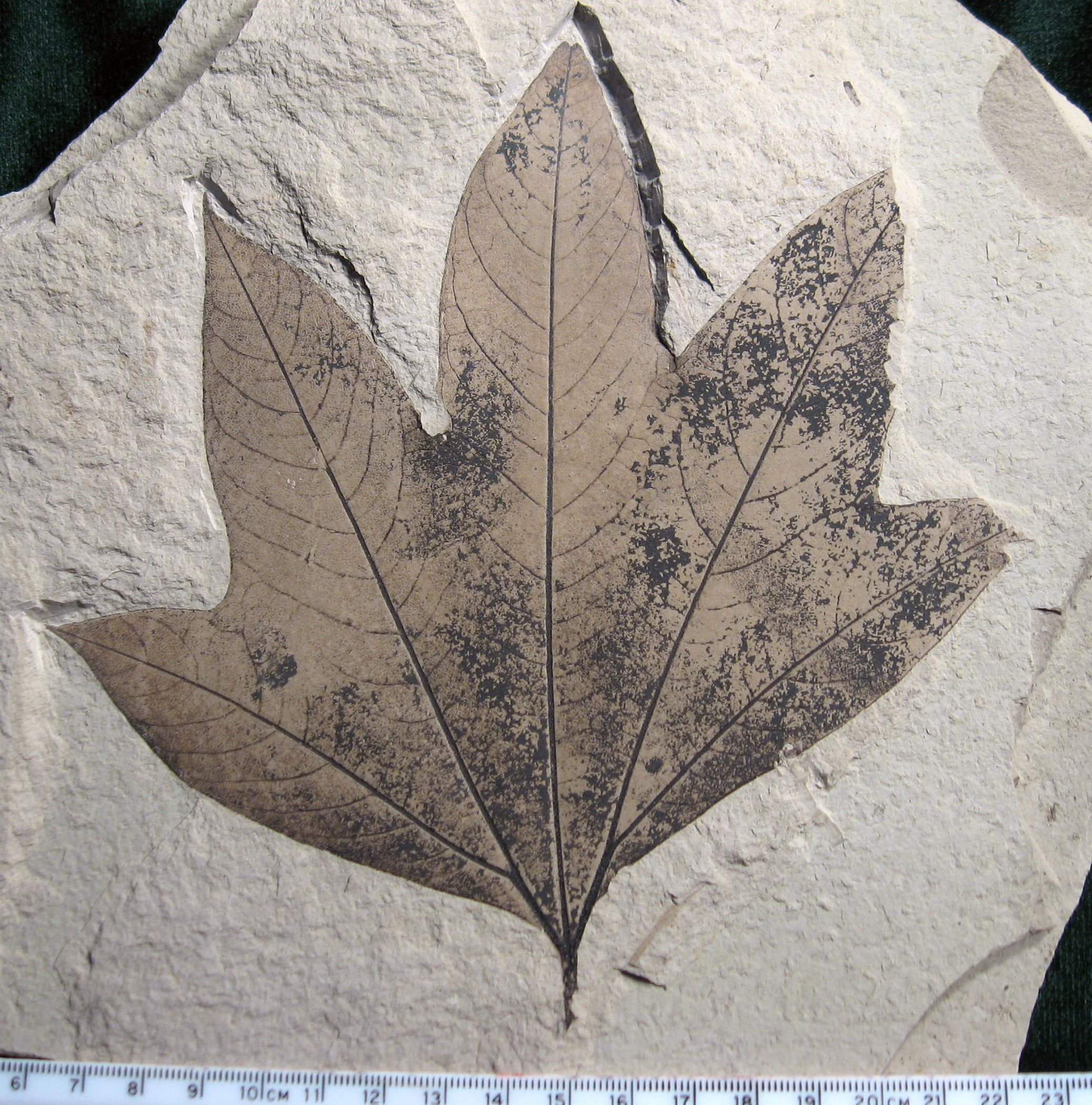
49-million-year-old fossil Macginitiea gracilis from the Klondike Mountain Formation, Washington

== Description ==
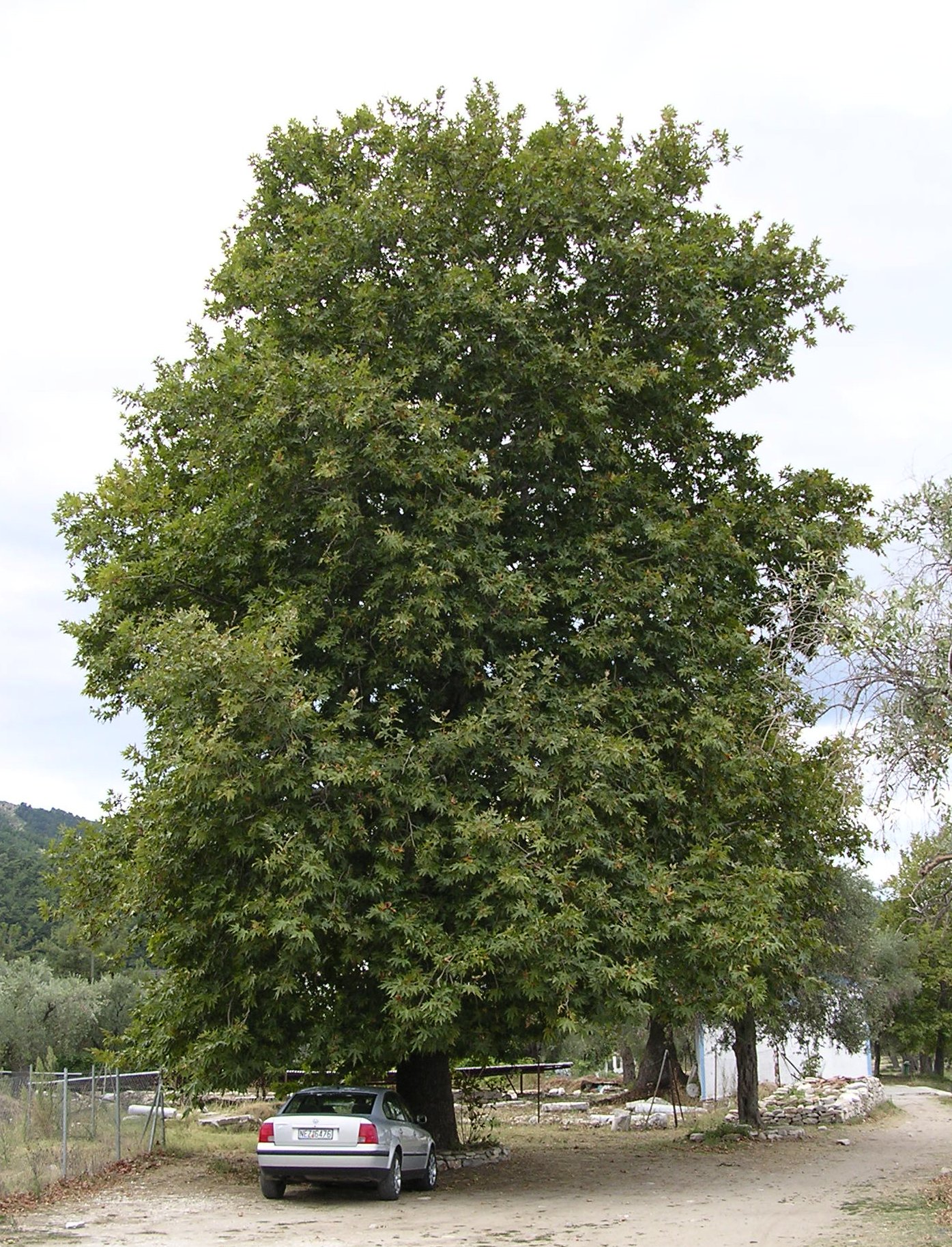
Example of P. orientalis

- Large, sympodial, deciduous tree, speckled bark that sheds in large irregular sheets, leaving a smooth surface that is mottled and pale, persistent bark at the base of the trunk, indumentum with large glandular hairs, multicellular and uniserrate or short with uniserrate ramification (in candelabrum), in stellate fascicles; glandular hairs with unicellular, globular capitulum, cuticular waxes without crystalloids, with rods and plates
- Leaves generally with very variable shapes and nervation, simple, alternate, more or less distichous, isobilateral palmate with three to seven lobes (palmatifid to palmatisect) with whole edges or with glandular teeth (each one with a midvein that broadens towards the glandular apex, where it ends in an open hole), or penninerved and whole (Platanus kerrii), this shape common in young, vernal leaves in other species, vernation folded, with the petiole usually sheathed, enclosing the axillary bud (bud is free in P. kerrii), stipules foliose, large, intrapetiolar, tubular, normally caduceus, in P. kerrii scarious, small, basally fused to the petiole, domatia present, stomata irregularly anomocytic
- Stems with aggregated rays in the xylem, with nodes septilacunar, cork cambium present and superficial, buds covered by single scale
- Plants monoecious, the flowers of each sex in separate inflorescences
- Inflorescences in large hanging peduncles, each one a unisexual, globular capitulum, pedunculate or seated, with numerous flowers, derived from the condensation of a panicle, with a circular bract at the base and bracteoles among the flowers
- Flowers small, inconspicuous, hypogynous, regular unisexual, receptacle short, smooth, hypogynous disk absent, perianth reduced, sepals number three to four, rarely eight, free or basally fused, shorter than the petals, triangular. Petals number three to four, rarely eight, truncated-spatulate or vestigial, scarious, frequently absent in the female flowers, male flowers with androecium haplostemonous, isostemonous, oppositisepal, with number three to four, rarely eight, stamens, gynostemium short or vestigial, anthers basifixed, not versatile, dithecous, tetrasporangiate, elongated, connectivum apically widened, peltate, dehiscence along longitudinal valves; pistillidium sometimes present, female flowers with superior gynoecium carpels apocarpous in two or three whorls, imperfectly closed apically, surrounded by large petals, linear stylodious, stigmas internal, decurrent in two ridges, more or less dry, two ovules per carpel but one nearly always aborts, orthotropous, bitegmic, crassinucellated, pendulous, apical to marginal placentation, three or four staminodes 3-4, no nectaries
- Fruit in an achene, clavate, grouped in a globular capituliform infructescence, each fruit surrounded by long hairs
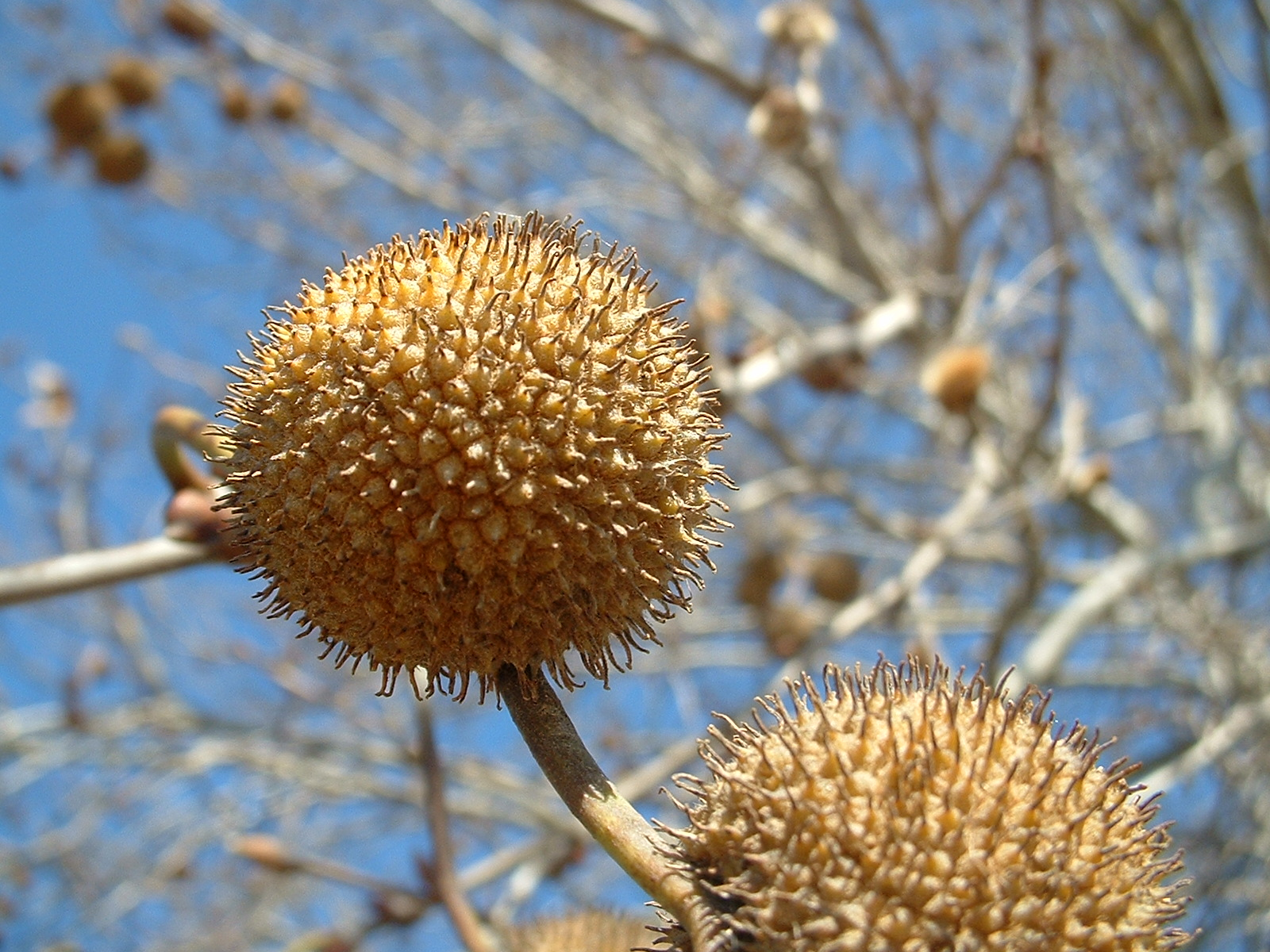
Fruiting body of P. orientalis (Oriental plane).

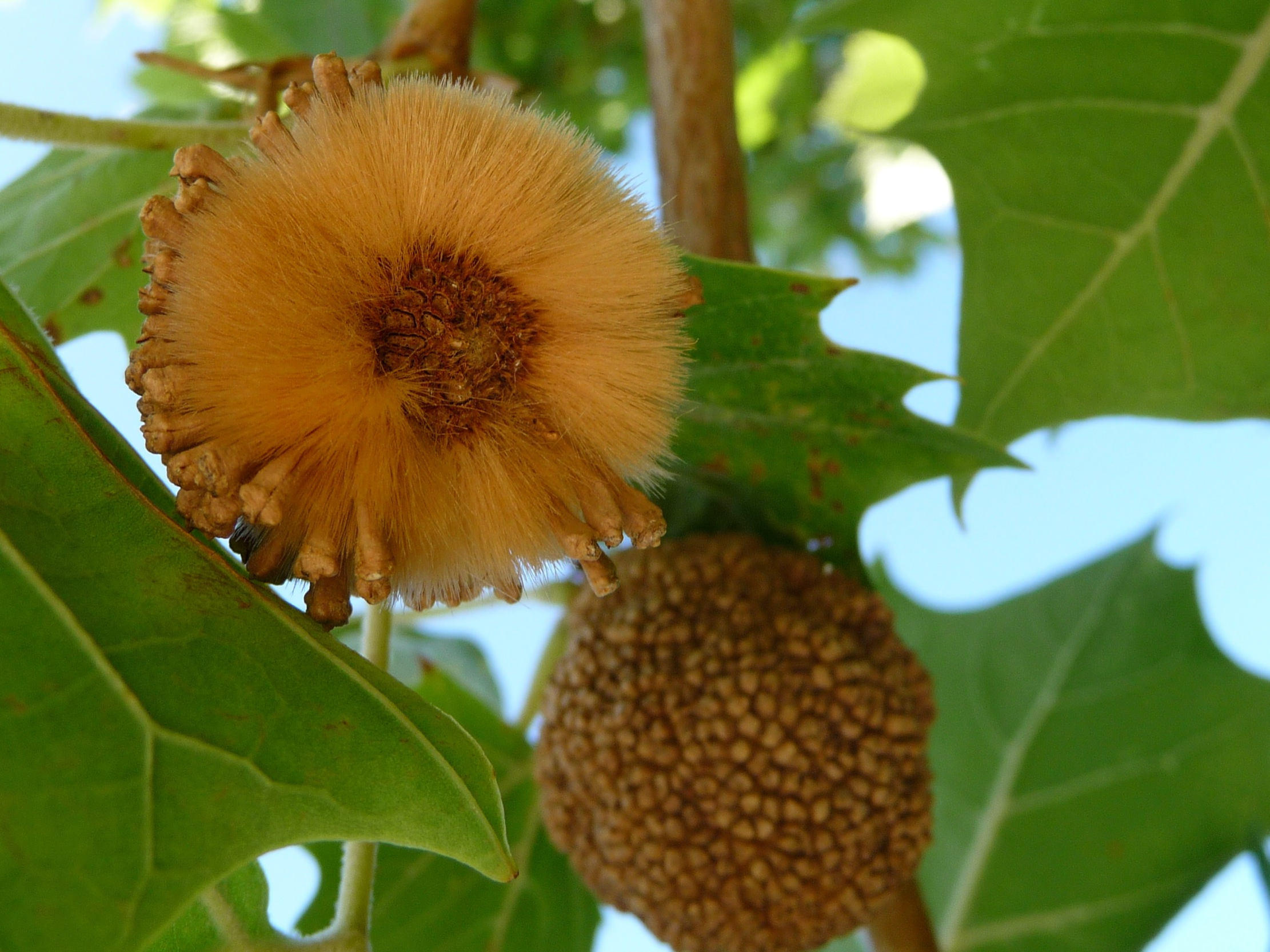
Fruiting body of P. occidentalis (American sycamore) with some achenes removed

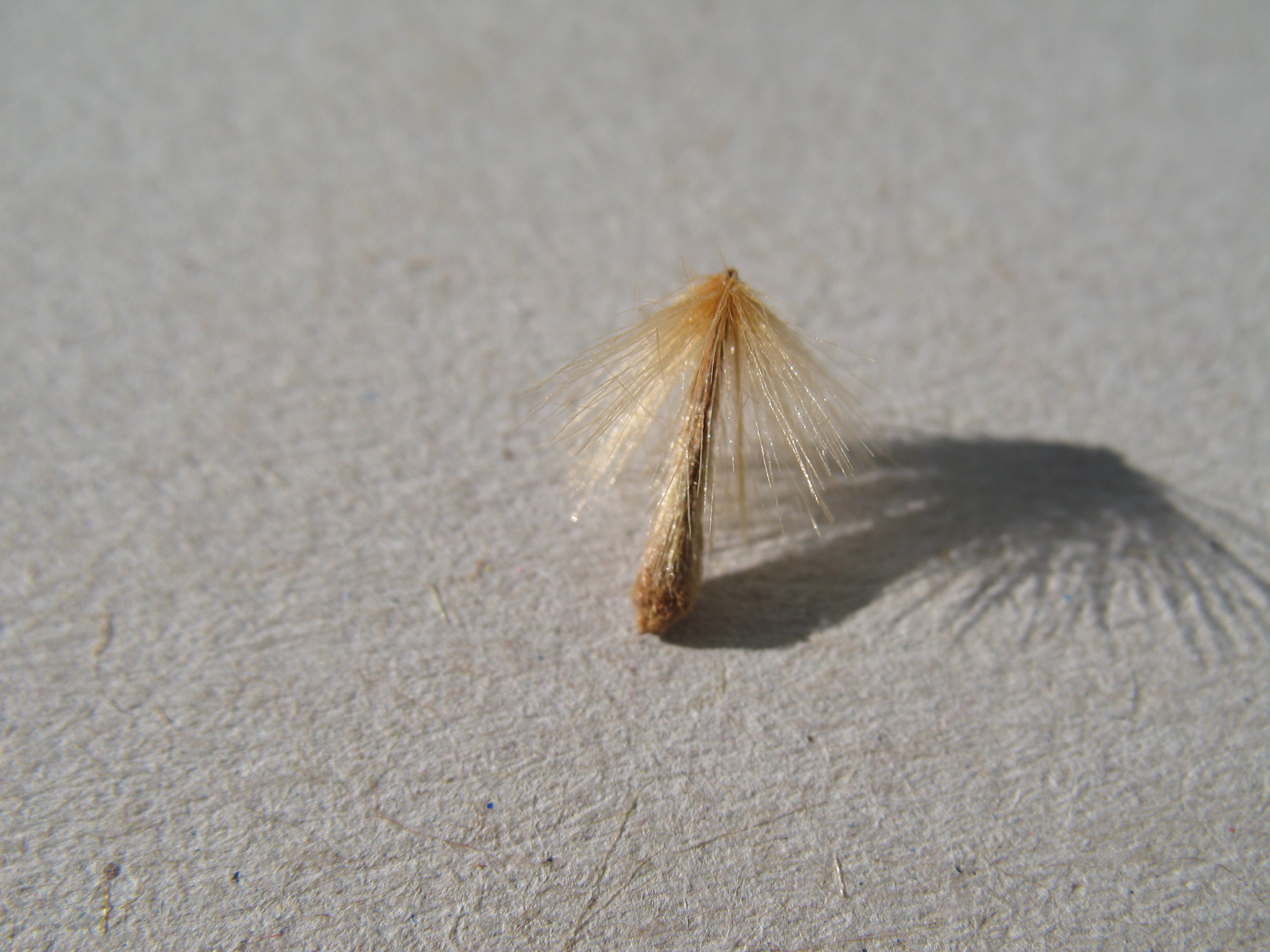
An achene

Cross section of an achene with the seed shown in brown
- Seeds are small with thin testa with little endosperm, oily and proteinaceous, embryo thin and straight with two linear cotyledons, often uneven
- Pollen in subprolate monads, 16-22 μm in length, tricolpate, sometimes sextarugate, tectate-columellate, reticulated surface, the base layer as thick as the tectum
- Chromosomal number: 2n = 14, 16, 21, 42; x probably equal to 7 or 8

== Ecology ==
Pollination is anemophilous; flowering begins at the start of spring when the new leaves are sprouting. The heads that sustain the fruit normally shed the year after they have matured, during the autumn. Dispersion of the individual fruiting bodies, with their thistledown, is anemochorous (they are sometimes dispersed by water as a secondary mechanism).

The plants grow in cool situations in temperate climates and are frequently found on the banks of rivers and streams. They are totally absent from dry or excessively cold areas.

== Phytochemistry ==
They contain cyanogenic glycosides derived from tyrosine, flavonoids belonging to the proanthocyanidins group (e.g. prodelphinidin) and flavonols (kaempferol, quercetin, myricetin), in addition to triterpenols (including betulinic acid). They lack ellagic acid, saponins, and sapogenins.

== Cultivation ==
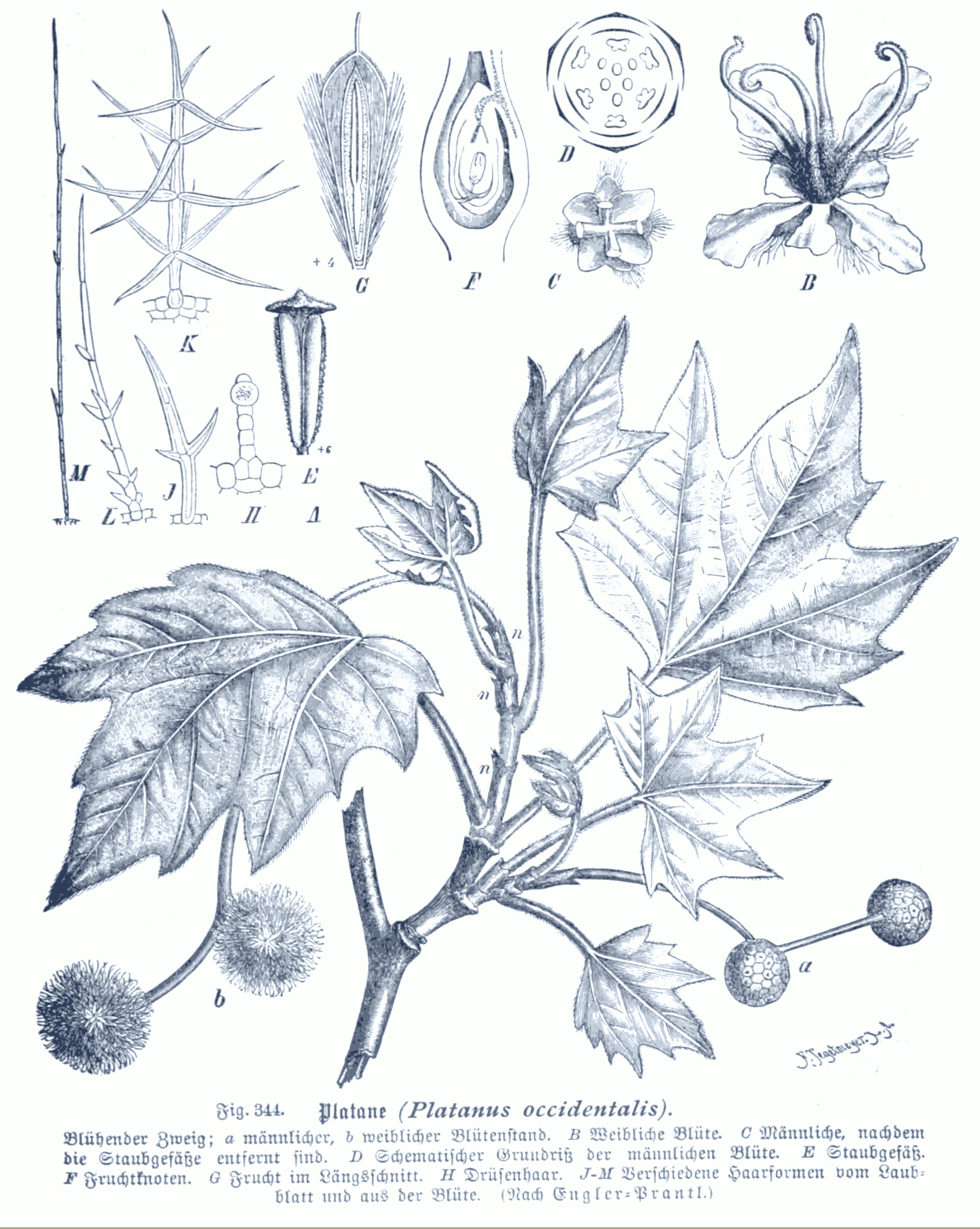
Morphological details of P. occidentalis

The main use for a number of the species is to provide shade in pedestrian areas in temperate regions, particularly the London plane (Platanus × hispanica), which is widely distributed throughout Europe and North America. It is highly resistant, probably due to so-called hybrid vigour, although its use requires caution due to their allergy-producing thistledown. The parent species are also grown for the same effect, but with poorer results as they are less resistant to contamination, among other reasons. The wood is used in cabinetmaking, paneling, and other interior work, and is also prized for its long burn time.

== Fossils ==
A large number of fossils of this family have been recorded from the Lower Cretaceous (98-113 million years ago, Platanocarpus). The examples from that time had very small pollen (8-10 μm) and a developed perianth and they lacked hairs at the base of the nucule. It is thought to have had entomophilous pollination. During the mid Cretaceous, the fossilized forms with platanoid leaves became mixed with pinnate leaves (Sapindopsis) or pedatisect leaves (Debeya, Dewalquea), and these forms lasted until the Eocene. The leaves with typical stipules belonging to the sub-genus Platanus are very common in Palaeocene formations (60 M years ago). It is thought that the only modern genus, Platanus, is a relict that can be considered a living fossil. It must have been polyploid during its evolution judging by the size of its stomata.

== Systematic position ==
The APG II system (2003) allows the option of including it in the family Proteaceae, or treating it as distinct as a segregate family. In as far as APG II accepts the family, it is placed in the order Proteales, in the clade eudicots. This represents a slight change from the APG system of 1998, which did accept this family. The Cronquist system of 1981 recognized the family and placed it in order Hamamelidales, in subclass Hamamelidae [sic] in class Magnoliopsida (dicotyledons). The Dahlgren system and Thorne system (1992) also recognized this family and placed it in the order Hamamelidales in superorder Rosanae in subclass Magnoliidae sensu Dahlgren and Thorne (dicotyledons). The Engler system, in its 1964 update, also recognized the family and placed it in the order Rosales in subclass Archichlamydeae of class Dicotyledoneae. The Wettstein system, last revised in 1935, also recognized the family and placed it in the order Hamamelidales in the Monochlamydeae in subclass Choripetalae of the class Dicotyledones. Based on molecular and morphological data the APW (Angiosperm Phylogeny Website) places the family in the order Proteales as a sister family to the Proteaceae, making them the Northern Hemisphere version of this family (cf. AP-website).

== Taxa included ==
Theoretical introduction to Taxonomy

The only extant genus, Platanus L., 1753, has the type species Platanus orientalis L., 1753. It is divided into two subgenera: the subgenus Castaneophyllum J.-F. Leroy, 1982, with elliptical, penninerved leaves with small scarious, stipules, that only includes Platanus kerrii Gagnep., 1939, an isolated relict species that represents the genus’ evolutionary basal branch and which is the sister group of the other species, which comprise the subgenus Platanus.

== Hybrids ==
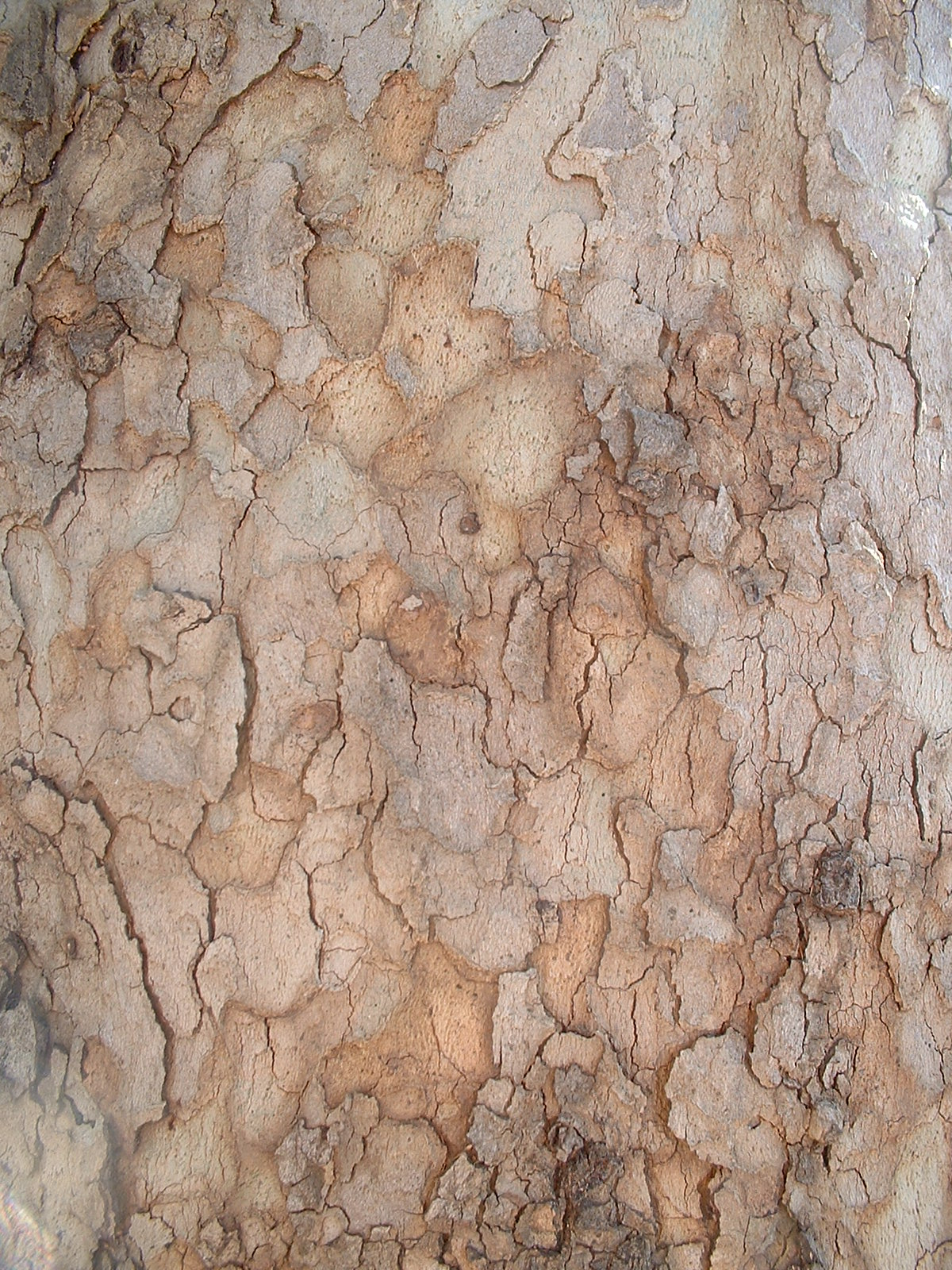
Bark of P. orientalis

The London plane or hybrid plane has long been considered a hybrid derived from the cross between P. occidentalis and P. orientalis, despite this its origin is not clear. Some experts think it originated in London and others in Spain or even in natural or cultivated hybrid form (or not) in Turkey. The question has not been investigated with modern molecular methods. As a consequence, even its nomenclature is hotly debated, to the extent that until recently, some anglophone authors denied the priority of the name used by Otto von Münchhausen (following Maria da Luz de Oliveira Tavares Monteiro da Rocha Afonso, 1990, see References). The plant is not found in the wild, though it appears in a naturalised form along the banks of rivers and streams.

Hybrid Platanus × hispanica Mill. ex Münchh., 1770 (= P. orientalis var. acerifolia Aiton, 1789; P. hybrida Brot., 1804; P. vulgaris Spach, 1841, nom. illeg.; P. × acerifolia.

Other names proposed for hybrids that are probably synonymous with the above, which is the only name in English, and which represent smaller minorities are:

- Hybrid Platanus × cantabrigensis A.Henry, 1919
- Hybrid Platanus × parviloba A.Henry, 1919

The references consulted do not agree as to whether the fruit is a nucule or achene, the difference between the two ultimately depends on the size of the pericarp and the extent of its lignification. The fruit is dry, indehiscent, monocarpelar and monospermatic.
