= List of Yucca species =

This is a list of the species in the genus Yucca. They are commonly called yuccas in English, but are also called Adam's needle or Spanish-bayonet.

As of 2025 Plants of the World Online (POWO) and World Flora Online both list 50 valid species. In addition, POWO lists three other species, Yucca jaegeriana (McKelvey) L.W.Lenz, Yucca muscipula Ayala-Hern., Ríos-Gómez, E.Solano & García-Mend., and Yucca pinicola Zamudio, that WFO lists as unchecked or as a synonym of another species. There are also two natural hybrids, Yucca × schottii, which was formerly listed as a species under various names, and Yucca × quinnarjenii.

== Species list ==
Species
Plant	Flowers	Species name	Year	Range
		Yucca aloifolia L.	1753	Southeastern US, Central and Southeastern Mexico
		Yucca angustissima Engelm. ex Trel.	1902	Arizona, Colorado, New Mexico, & Utah
		Yucca arkansana Trel.	1902	Arkansas, Kansas, Missouri, Oklahoma, & Texas
		Yucca baccata Torr.	1859	Southwestern US & Northern Mexico
		Yucca baileyi Wooton & Standl.	1913	Arizona, Colorado, New Mexico, & Utah
		Yucca brevifolia Engelm.	1871	Baja California Norte, western Arizona, southeastern California, southern Nevada, Sonora, & southwest Utah
		Yucca campestris McKelvey	1947	New Mexico & Texas
		Yucca capensis L.W.Lenz	1998	Baja California Sur
		Yucca carnerosana (Trel.) McKelvey	1938	Northeastern Mexico
		Yucca cernua E.L.Keith	2003	Texas
		Yucca coahuilensis Matuda & I.Piña	1980	Coahuila
		Yucca constricta Buckley	1862	Texas
		Yucca decipiens Trel.	1907	Northeastern and southwestern Mexico
		Yucca declinata Laferr.	1995	Sonora
		Yucca desmetiana Baker	1870	Chihuahua
		Yucca elata (Engelm.) Engelm.	1882	Southwestern US & northern Mexico
		Yucca endlichiana Trel.	1907	Coahuila & Nuevo León
		Yucca faxoniana (Trel.) Sarg.	1905	Chihuahua, Coahuila, New Mexico, & Texas
		Yucca feeanoukiae Hochstätter	2013	Utah
		Yucca filamentosa L.	1753	Eastern United States
		Yucca filifera Chabaud	1876	Northeastern, central, & southwestern Mexico
		Yucca flaccida Haw.	1819	Eastern US & Ontario
		Yucca gigantea Lem.	1859	Central America & southern Mexico
		Yucca glauca Nutt.	1813	Central United States & Alberta
		Yucca gloriosa L.	1753	Southeastern United States
		Yucca grandiflora Gentry	1957	Chihuahua, Sonora
		Yucca harrimaniae Trel.	1902	Arizona, Colorado, New Mexico, Nevada, & Utah
		Yucca intermedia McKelvey	1947	Central New Mexico
		Yucca jaliscensis (Trel.) Trel.	1920	Northeastern and southwestern Mexico
		Yucca lacandonica Gómez Pompa & J.Valdés	1962	Campeche, Chiapas, Oaxaca, Tabasco, & Veracruz
		Yucca linearifolia Clary	1995	Coahuila & Nuevo León
		Yucca luminosa M.H.J.van der Meer	2024	Northeastern Mexico
		Yucca madrensis Gentry	1972	Sonora & Chihuahua
		Yucca mixtecana García-Mend.	1998	Oaxaca & Puebla
Several Yucca necopina plants with long straight leaves that taper to sharp points that radiate outward in every direction. Two of the plants have tall stalks emerging from the center, though they are unbranched in this photo.		Yucca necopina Shinners	1958	Texas
		Yucca neomexicana Wooton & Standl.	1913	Colorado, New Mexico, & Oklahoma
		Yucca pallida McKelvey	1947	Texas
		Yucca periculosa Baker	1870	Oaxaca, Puebla, Tlaxcala, & Veracruz
		Yucca potosina Rzed.	1955	San Luis Potosí & Tamaulipas
		Yucca queretaroensis Piña Luján	1989	Guanajuato, Hidalgo, Querétaro, & San Luis Potosí
		Yucca × quinnarjenii Hochstätter	2021	New Mexico
		Yucca reverchonii Trel.	1911	Coahuila & Texas
		Yucca rostrata Engelm. ex Trel.	1902	Chihuahua, Coahuila, & Texas
		Yucca rupicola Scheele	1850	Chihuahua, Coahuila, Nuevo León, Tamaulipas, & Texas
		Yucca schidigera Roezl ex Ortgies	1871	Baja California Norte, Arizona, California, Nevada, Sonora, & Utah
		Yucca × schottii Engelm.	1873	Arizona, Chihuahua, New Mexico, Nuevo León, Sonora
		Yucca sterilis (Neese & S.L.Welsh) S.L.Welsh & L.C.Higgins	2008	Northeast Utah
		Yucca tenuistyla Trel.	1902	Texas
		Yucca thompsoniana Trel.	1911	Chihuahua, Coahuila, Durango, Nuevo León, & Texas
		Yucca treculiana Carrière	1858	Northeastern Mexico, New Mexico, & Texas
		Yucca utahensis McKelvey	1947	Northwestern Arizona, southeastern Nevada, & southwestern Utah
		Yucca valida Brandegee	1889	Baja California Norte & Baja California Sur
