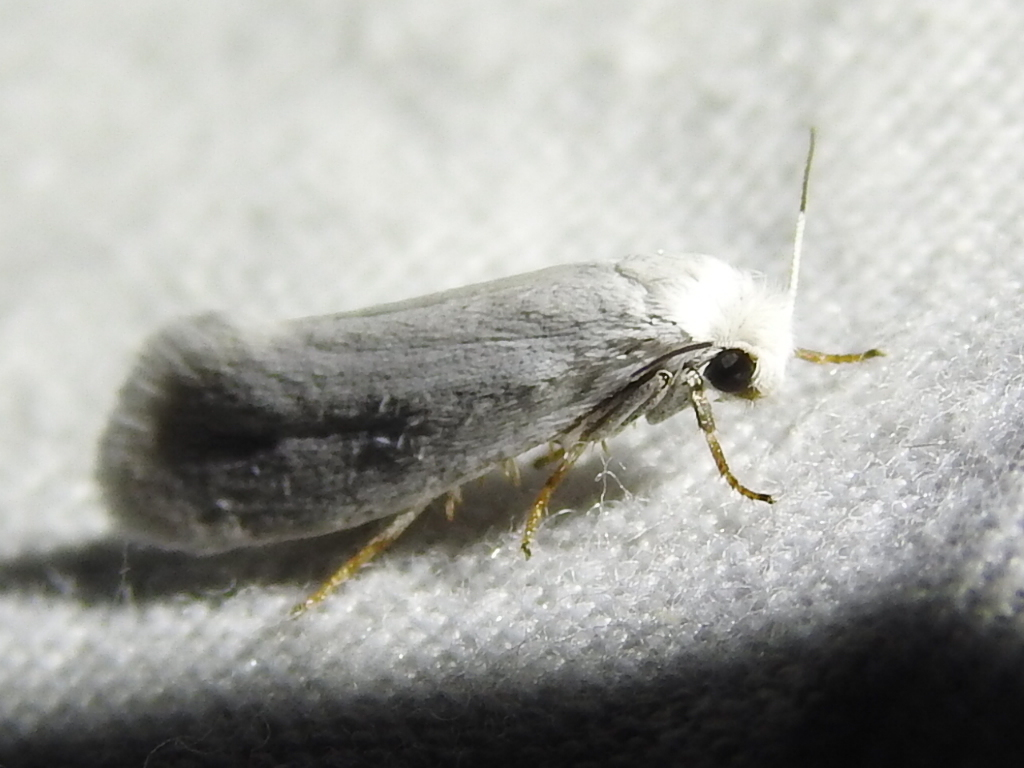

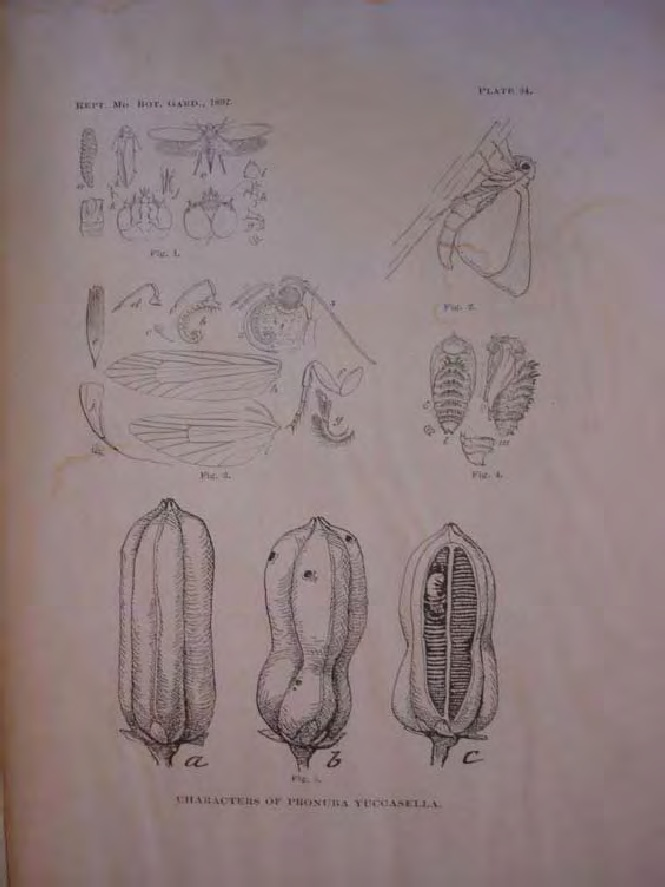
- "Characters of Pronuba yuccasella", 1892 drawing

Scientific classification
- Domain: Eukaryota
- Kingdom: Animalia
- Phylum: Arthropoda
- Class: Insecta
- Order: Lepidoptera
- Family: Prodoxidae
- Genus: Tegeticula
- Species: T. yuccasella

Binomial name
- Tegeticula yuccasella (Riley, 1872)

Synonyms
- Pronuba yuccasella Riley, 1872; Tegeticula alba Zeller, 1873

= Tegeticula yuccasella =

Species of moth

Tegeticula yuccasella, the yucca moth, is a moth of the family Prodoxidae. The species was first described by Charles Valentine Riley in 1872. It can be found in North America from Texas to southern Canada.

The wingspan is 18–27 mm.

The larvae feed on Yucca filamentosa, Yucca smalliana, Yucca flaccida, Yucca glauca, Yucca arkansana, Yucca constricta, Yucca rupicola, Yucca pallida, Yucca reverchoni and Yucca aloifolia.
