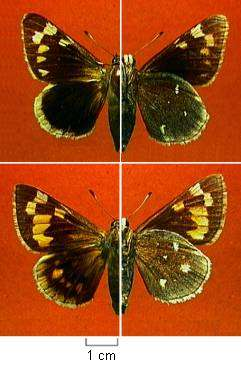

Scientific classification
- Kingdom: Animalia
- Phylum: Arthropoda
- Class: Insecta
- Order: Lepidoptera
- Family: Hesperiidae
- Genus: Megathymus
- Species: M. streckeri

Binomial name
- Megathymus streckeri (Skinner, 1895)

Synonyms
- Aegiale streckeri Skinner, 1895

= Megathymus streckeri =

Species of insect

Megathymus streckeri, or Strecker's giant skipper, is butterfly of the family Hesperiidae. It is found in the United States from southeastern Montana and southwestern North Dakota south to southern Texas and west to northwestern Arizona and southwestern Utah. Its habitats include short grass prairies, sand hills, and rocky bluffs.

The wingspan is 57–78 mm.

The larvae feed on Yucca glauca, Yucca constricta, Yucca angustissima and Yucca baileyi.
