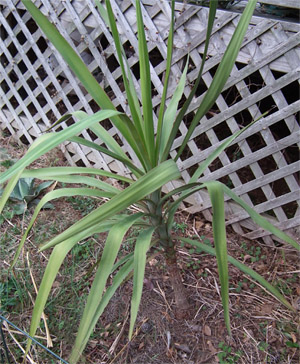
- Yucca jaliscensis

Conservation status
- Vulnerable (IUCN 3.1)

Scientific classification
- Kingdom: Plantae
- Clade: Tracheophytes
- Clade: Angiosperms
- Clade: Monocots
- Order: Asparagales
- Family: Asparagaceae
- Subfamily: Agavoideae
- Genus: Yucca
- Species: Y. jaliscensis

Binomial name
- Yucca jaliscensis Trel.

Synonyms
- Yucca × schottii var. jaliscensis Trel.; Yucca barrancasecca Pasquale

= Yucca jaliscensis =

Jalisco Soapwort Izote

Species of flowering plant

Yucca jaliscensis is a Yucca species native to the highlands of southwestern Mexico. Common names for this species include Jalisco Yucca, Jalisco Soapwort, Izote Yucca. It is native to mountainous areas at about 5000 feet in the States of Jalisco, Colima and Guanajuato.

== Description ==
Yucca jaliscensis is a tall tree-like species. Although at old age it can grow up to 10 m (33 ft) in height, with a spread to 6 m (20 ft), it is usually found at less than 7.5 m (25 ft) in height. It may have a somewhat thickened trunk base and it maybe single trunked or it can be mildly multitrunked. The usually short trunk base is often found at 0.5 to 2 feet wide, but can grow to over 4 or 5 feet in diameter on old specimens. There is usually around 5 to 8 branches growing upright off the short trunk with the leaves at the top of the trunks. The leaves are stiff to flexible, variably blue to green colored, strap-like, spineless, up to 1 m (3 ft) in length, and up to 8 cm (3 in) in width. The old leaves usually self clean from the trunk over time. The branched, upright or sideways inclined inflorescence is 0.4 m (1 ft) to 1 m (3 ft) long, erect or with drooping fruit, canescent with blunt thick hairs to densely pubescent, filaments have blunt hairs and are pilose. The fruits are 4–5 cm in diameter. The ball-shaped white flowers bloom September to May or sometimes almost any time of the year. Flowers are 2-3.5 cm long and 1-1.5 cm wide.

== Distribution & habitat ==
Yucca jaliscensis grows in Mexico near the Pacific coast in the states of Jalisco, Colima, and Guanajuato on plains and low hills between about 3000–7000 ft. Associated with Agave colimana and other Agave species. It is often grown as an ornamental around homes or settlements and is not found in the wild often. In nature, Yucca jaliscensis can be found in ravines that are forested, in narrow, winding stream gorges, in deciduous tropical type forests, but most often found in pine, oak, or other broad-leaved trees forests that are in or near narrow and winding stream gorges. Other habitats include dry hills or steep rocky volcanic slopes, with semi-arid and rocky subtropical short oak tree forests; mixed and patchy, also it's sometimes found in open fields with corn or other crops.

== Taxonomy ==
The accepted species name is known today as Yucca jaliscensis. The first mention of that name was by William Trelease in 1920. It was formally thought to be a variation of Y. × schottii in 1902 by Trelease, but later studies showed it clearly to be a distinct species being both more branched and larger in size as a whole, so Trelease named it Yucca jaliscensis in reference to the area where it can be found (Jalisco, Mexico).

== Cultivation ==
The species can be grown in a variety of soils and is drought-tolerant. Yucca jaliscensis is rare and is geographically isolated from other representatives. It is closely related to Yucca schottii, Yucca madrensis, and Yucca grandiflora. It is little known and rare in cultivation. In dry conditions, Yucca jaliscensis has been cold hardy in Albuquerque, New Mexico where temperatures can fall below 5 °F (pers. comm. Ferguson), old specimens can be admired here. Propagation is by suckers, cuttings or seed.
