= Tegeticula tehuacana =

Scientific classification
- Kingdom: Animalia
- Phylum: Arthropoda
- Clade: Pancrustacea
- Class: Insecta
- Order: Lepidoptera
- Family: Prodoxidae
- Genus: Tegeticula
- Species: T. tehuacana

Binomial name
- Tegeticula tehuacana Pellmyr & Balcázar-Lara, 2008

Species of moth

Tegeticula tehuacana is a moth of the family Prodoxidae. It is found in Mexico in Oaxaca, western- and south-western Veracruz, and central-northern Puebla centred on the Tehuacan Valley.

The wingspan is 20–24 mm for males and 22.5–26 mm for females. Adults are on wing in late April.

The larvae feed on Yucca periculosa and Yucca mixtecana.
