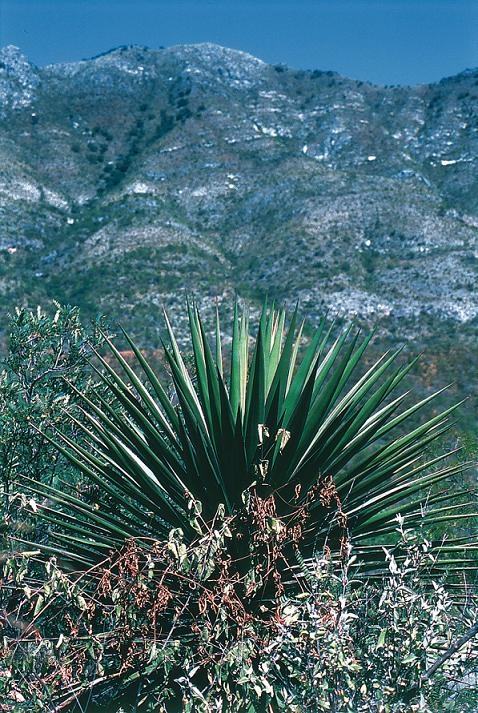

Conservation status
- Data Deficient (IUCN 3.1)

Scientific classification
- Kingdom: Plantae
- Clade: Tracheophytes
- Clade: Angiosperms
- Clade: Monocots
- Order: Asparagales
- Family: Asparagaceae
- Subfamily: Agavoideae
- Genus: Yucca
- Species: Y. declinata

Binomial name
- Yucca declinata Laferr.

= Yucca declinata =

Sideways yucca

Species of flowering plant

Yucca declinata is a species of the genus Yucca, family Asparagaceae. It is known only from the vicinity of Bacanora, in the Mexican state of Sonora. Botanist Howard Scott Gentry first collected the species and mentioned it in print, noting the differences between this population and the closely related species Y. grandiflora H. S. Gentry and Y. arizonica McKelvey (sic, = Yucca baccata var. brevifolia L. D. Benson & R. A. Darrow). He did not, however, describe it as a new species. Later examination of his descriptions and his material led to the recognition of this as a new species.

The epithet declinata refers to the fact that this is the only known species of Yucca in which the flowering stalk is oriented horizontally. The plant is tree-like up to 6 m tall, branching in the crown and suckering at the base. Leaves are up to 140 cm long, yellowish-green, without teeth. Flowering stalk is up to 130 cm m long, glabrous, usually perpendicular to the main stem. Flowers small, white. Fruit oblong, tapering at base, 15–20 cm long, not splitting apart when ripe. Seeds black, flat, slightly egg-shaped, 1.0-1.5 cm in diameter. The species occurs in open woodlands and scrublands on volcanic and limestone soils.
