= Brickellia gentryi =

Scientific classification
- Kingdom: Plantae
- Clade: Tracheophytes
- Clade: Angiosperms
- Clade: Eudicots
- Clade: Asterids
- Order: Asterales
- Family: Asteraceae
- Genus: Brickellia
- Species: B. gentryi

Binomial name
- Brickellia gentryi (DC.) A.Gray

Species of flowering plant

Brickellia gentryi is a Mexican species of flowering plants in the family Asteraceae. It is found only in the state of Durango in northwestern Mexico.

Brickellia gentryi is superficially similar to B. lanata but has thinner leaves and white, nodding (hanging) flower heads in groups of 2–3.

The species is named for American botanist Howard Scott Gentry, 1903–1993.
