= Yucca angustifolia =

Yucca angustifolia is a botanical synonym of two species of plant:

- Yucca glauca published in 1813 by Frederick Traugott Pursh (1774–1820)
- Yucca gloriosa published in 1859 by Élie-Abel Carrière (1818–1896)
