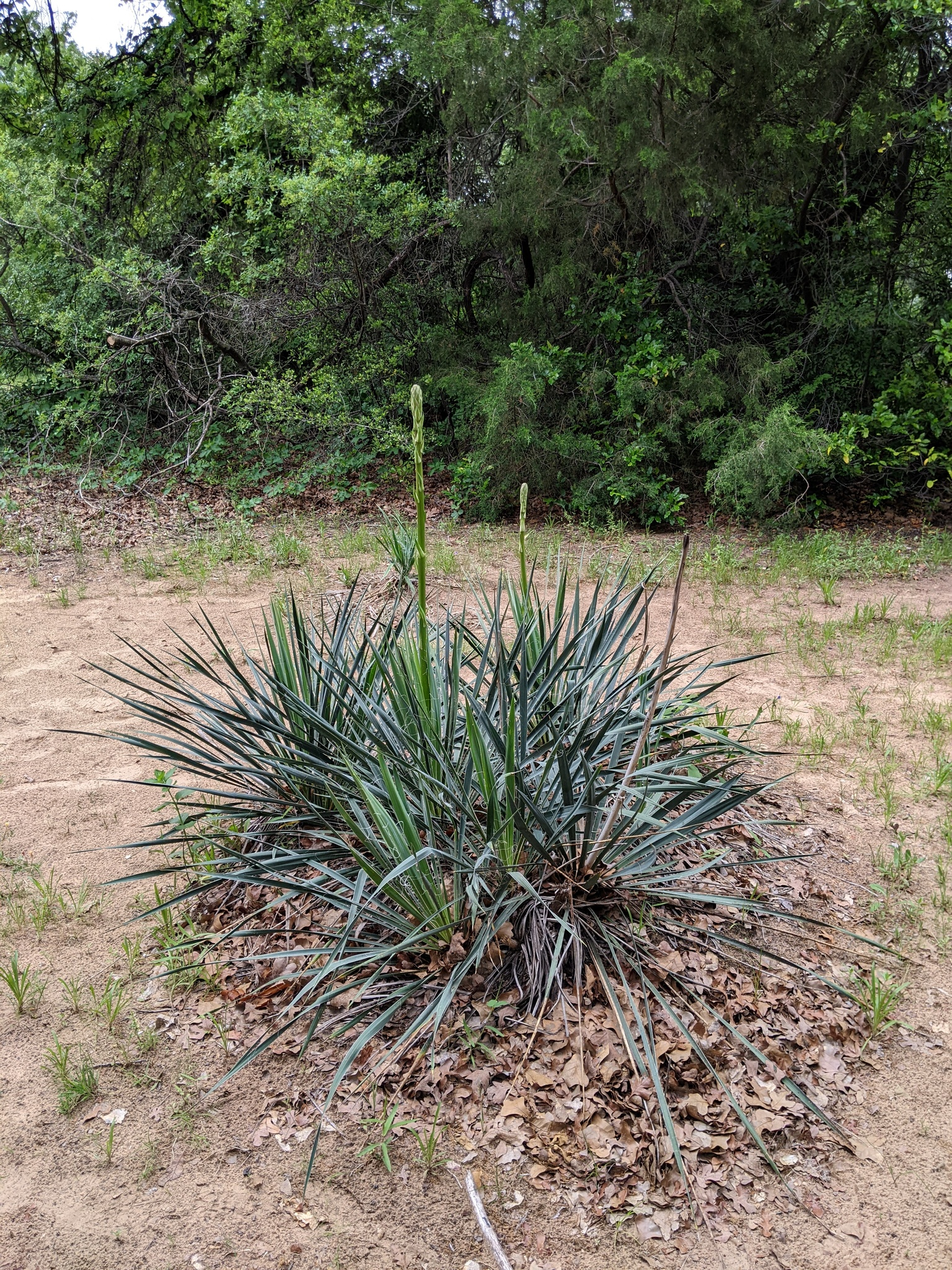
- Tarrant County, Texas

Conservation status
- Vulnerable (IUCN 3.1)

Scientific classification
- Kingdom: Plantae
- Clade: Tracheophytes
- Clade: Angiosperms
- Clade: Monocots
- Order: Asparagales
- Family: Asparagaceae
- Subfamily: Agavoideae
- Genus: Yucca
- Species: Y. necopina

Binomial name
- Yucca necopina Shinners 1958

= Yucca necopina =

Species of flowering plant

Yucca necopina Shinners, the Brazos River yucca or Glen Rose yucca, is a species in the family Asparagaceae. It is a rare endemic native to a small region in north-central Texas.

== Description ==
This plant is a perennial shrub that grows in small colonies of rosettes. The plant grows to a height of 2 feet, with bloom stalks reaching a height of 7 feet. Its flowers are greenish-white and bloom in Spring. The species is similar to Y. pallida and Y. arkansana, and at one time it was thought the species could be a hybrid of the two; later DNA evidence supports it being distinct.

== Distribution and habitat ==
This species grows in river terraces and deep sand, and is native to Somervell, Hood, Parker, and Tarrant Counties in Texas, west of Dallas and Fort Worth.
