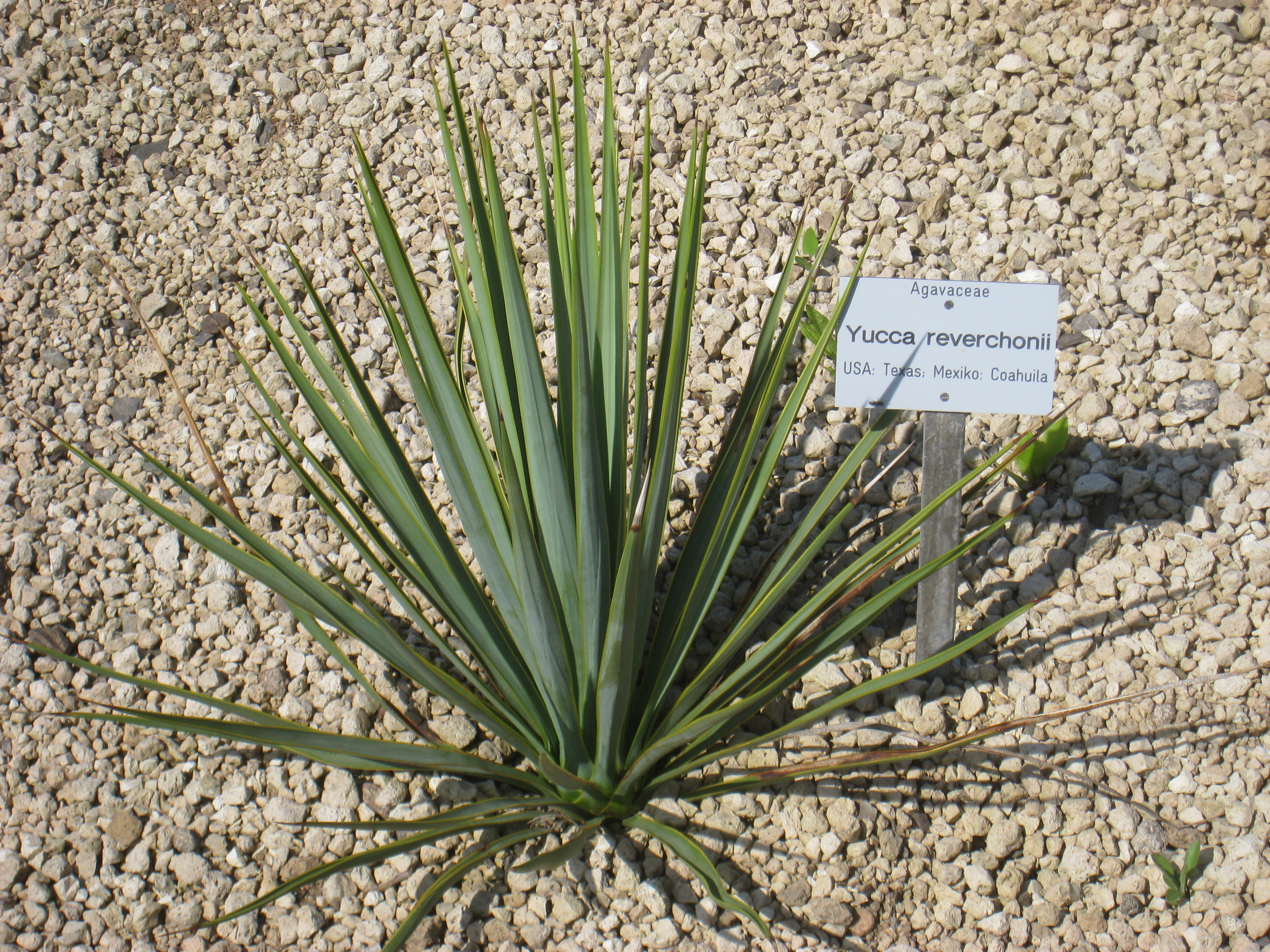

Conservation status
- Least Concern (IUCN 3.1)

Scientific classification
- Kingdom: Plantae
- Clade: Tracheophytes
- Clade: Angiosperms
- Clade: Monocots
- Order: Asparagales
- Family: Asparagaceae
- Subfamily: Agavoideae
- Genus: Yucca
- Species: Y. reverchonii

Binomial name
- Yucca reverchonii Trel.

= Yucca reverchonii =

San Angelo yucca

Species of flowering plant

Yucca reverchonii is a plant in the family Asparagaceae. It is native to the Edwards Plateau region of Texas, as well as to the Mexican states of Tamaulipas, Nuevo León, Coahuila, Chihuahua, Durango, Zacatecas, Aguascalientes, and San Luís Potosí. It is known as the San Angelo yucca and is closely related to Y. rupicola Scheele and Y. thompsoniana Trel.

Characters that distinguish this species include:

- Low, trunkless growth form, forming scattered colonies on limestone.
- Leaves lack curling "hairs" on edges, and are very finely toothed.
- Leaves nearly flat, straight (little or no twist), and usually less than 15 mm wide.
