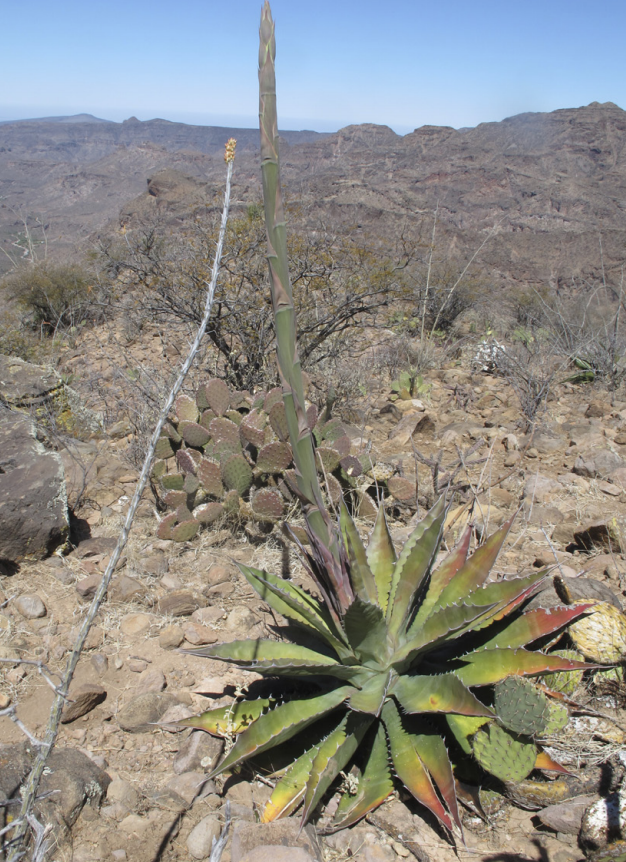

Conservation status
- Least Concern (IUCN 3.1)

Scientific classification
- Kingdom: Plantae
- Clade: Embryophytes
- Clade: Tracheophytes
- Clade: Angiosperms
- Clade: Monocots
- Order: Asparagales
- Family: Asparagaceae
- Subfamily: Agavoideae
- Genus: Agave
- Species: A. gigantensis

Binomial name
- Agave gigantensis Gentry

= Agave gigantensis =

Species of flowering plant

Agave gigantensis is a large, flowering agave plant found in Baja California Sur, Mexico. Its name is derived from the area of origin, not its large size. The plant is distinguishable by its red and purple leaves during flowering season. It is able to survive in harsh, rocky conditions and prefers dry and warm environments. The flowers of A. gigantensis are arranged in small clusters which diverge from a main branch. Unlike many other agave plants, A. gigantensis has been traditionally used in food and medicine by communities of western Mexico.

== Distribution ==
Agave gigantensis is found on the Baja California Sur peninsula in western Mexico, among the Sierra de la Giganta mountains. It has also been introduced to the southern United States, near Phoenix, Arizona.

== Habitat and ecology ==
This species typically grows in oak woodland communities and is able to grow on rough terrain with hard soil and rocks. It prefers growing in the desert, with a warm and dry climate. For example, Mexico and Arizona embody its preferred climate to grow in. The picture below shows the typical habitat for this species.

== Morphology ==
Individuals of this species contain large, smooth dark green leaves that are very thick. The leaves on Agave gigantensis contain large gray and white teeth on their outer edges that range from 6–8 cm (2.4–3.1 in) apart. They grow outwards from the center of the plant in various directions. The leaves turn purple and red in color when flowering occurs. The rosettes of this plant are medium-sized, growing to be about 1 m (3 ft 3 in) tall and 1.2 m (3 ft 11 in) wide. The flower head of Agave gigantensis is much taller, about 4–5 m (13–16 ft) in height. There is a stout flowering scape and the flower head contains small clusters of flowers, known as inflorescence.

== Flowers and fruit ==
Flowers of Agave gigantensis are arranged a group or cluster of flowers arranged on a stem that is composed of a main branch or a complicated arrangement of branches called an inflorescence. The flowers of this plant are known to arrange in an arching inflorescence. Morphologically, this indicates a modified part of the shoot of seed plants where flowers are formed. This species is also known for having geotropic flowers. The flowers are all cream-light chartreuse in color with yellow anthers and a slightly dark ovary. The most notable part of Agave gigantensis's fruit bearing potential is its tall fruiting stalks which shows an erect scape and congested particles. The fruits of Agave gigantensis are not well documented, however it is assumed that they are similar to other Agave species.

== Usage ==
Despite many other plants in the Agave species being inedible, such as Agave sobria, Agave gigantensis is both good for eating and distilling to make mezcal. It has been described by the people of Comondú Municipality, Mexico as "mescal pardo" or "pardito" which translates to brown mezcal, indicating this plant's ability to be used in traditional mezcal.

== Discovery ==
Agave gigantensis was first reported by an American botanist Howard Scott Gentry during his trip to Comondú, the west-central slopes of the Sierra de la Giganta Mountains, Mexico. The species of interest of his trip was Agave sobria. After collecting samples from A. sobria, he was informed of Agave gigantensis by the locals of Comondú, better known to them as "lechuguilla". After seeing the plant, H.S. Gentry pressed its leaf specimens and cataloged it as Agave gigantensis.
