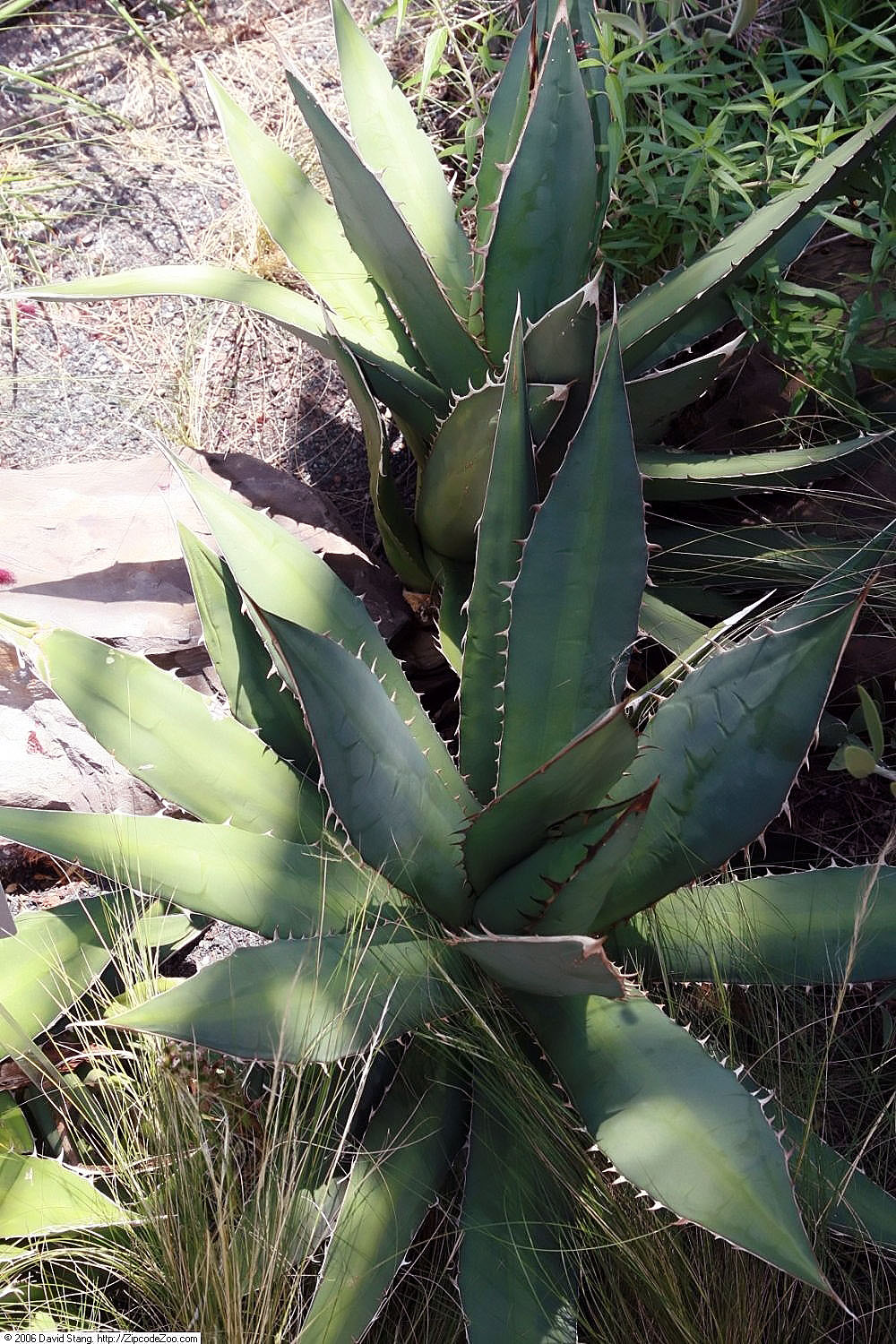
- A. titanota, United States Botanic Garden (David Stang, 2006)

Conservation status
- Endangered (IUCN 3.1)

Scientific classification
- Kingdom: Plantae
- Clade: Tracheophytes
- Clade: Angiosperms
- Clade: Monocots
- Order: Asparagales
- Family: Asparagaceae
- Subfamily: Agavoideae
- Genus: Agave
- Species: A. titanota

Binomial name
- Agave titanota Gentry

= Agave titanota =

Species of flowering plant

Agave titanota, the chalk agave, is a species of flowering plant in the family Asparagaceae. It is a medium-sized evergreen succulent perennial native to Oaxaca, Mexico. It often reaches 1-2 feet tall and 2-3 feet wide.

The plant forms a solitary rosette of broad whitish green leaves with variable spines, which are 1-2 feet long and 5 inches wide, typically narrower toward the base and widest near the tip. Occasionally, it produces offsets. Mature plants may produce a flower head from 3m to 6m tall with yellow flowers. As it is monocarpic, this signals the death of the plant.

It can tolerate temperatures of −3 °C (27 °F), but in practice is best grown in a sheltered spot without severe frosts. It has gained the Royal Horticultural Society's Award of Garden Merit. This plant is suitable for USDA hardiness zones 9-11. It may be susceptible to scale insects and chlorosis resulting from magnesium deficiency.

Cultivars include 'White Ice', 'Filigree', and 'Solar Eclipse.'
