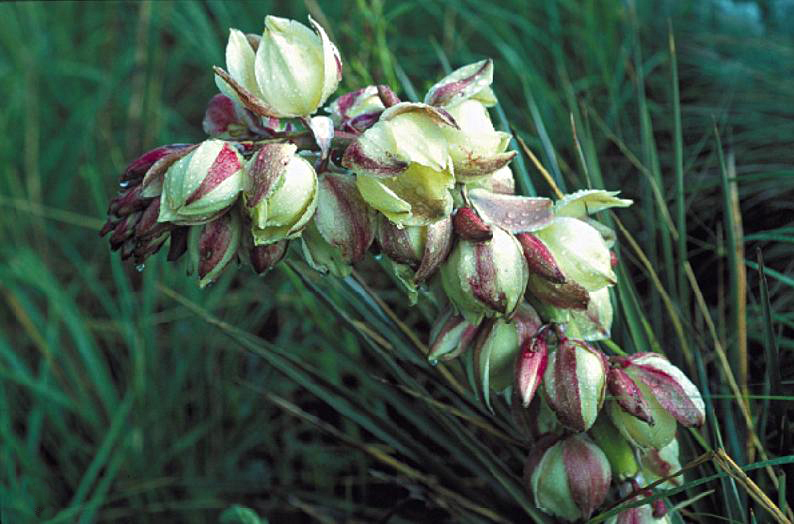

Conservation status
- Least Concern (IUCN 3.1)

Scientific classification
- Kingdom: Plantae
- Clade: Tracheophytes
- Clade: Angiosperms
- Clade: Monocots
- Order: Asparagales
- Family: Asparagaceae
- Subfamily: Agavoideae
- Genus: Yucca
- Species: Y. neomexicana

Binomial name
- Yucca neomexicana Wooton & Standl.

Synonyms
- Yucca harrimaniae var. neomexicana (Wooton & Standl.) Reveal; Yucca harrimaniae subsp. neomexicana (Wooton& Standl.) Hochstätter

= Yucca neomexicana =

New Mexican Spanish bayonet

Species of flowering plant

Yucca neomexicana Wooton & Standl. is a plant in the family Asparagaceae, native to New Mexico, Colorado and Oklahoma. Common name is "New Mexican Spanish bayonet." It is similar to Y. harrimaniae Trel. but with a longer flowering stalk and white (rather than yellowish) flowers.
