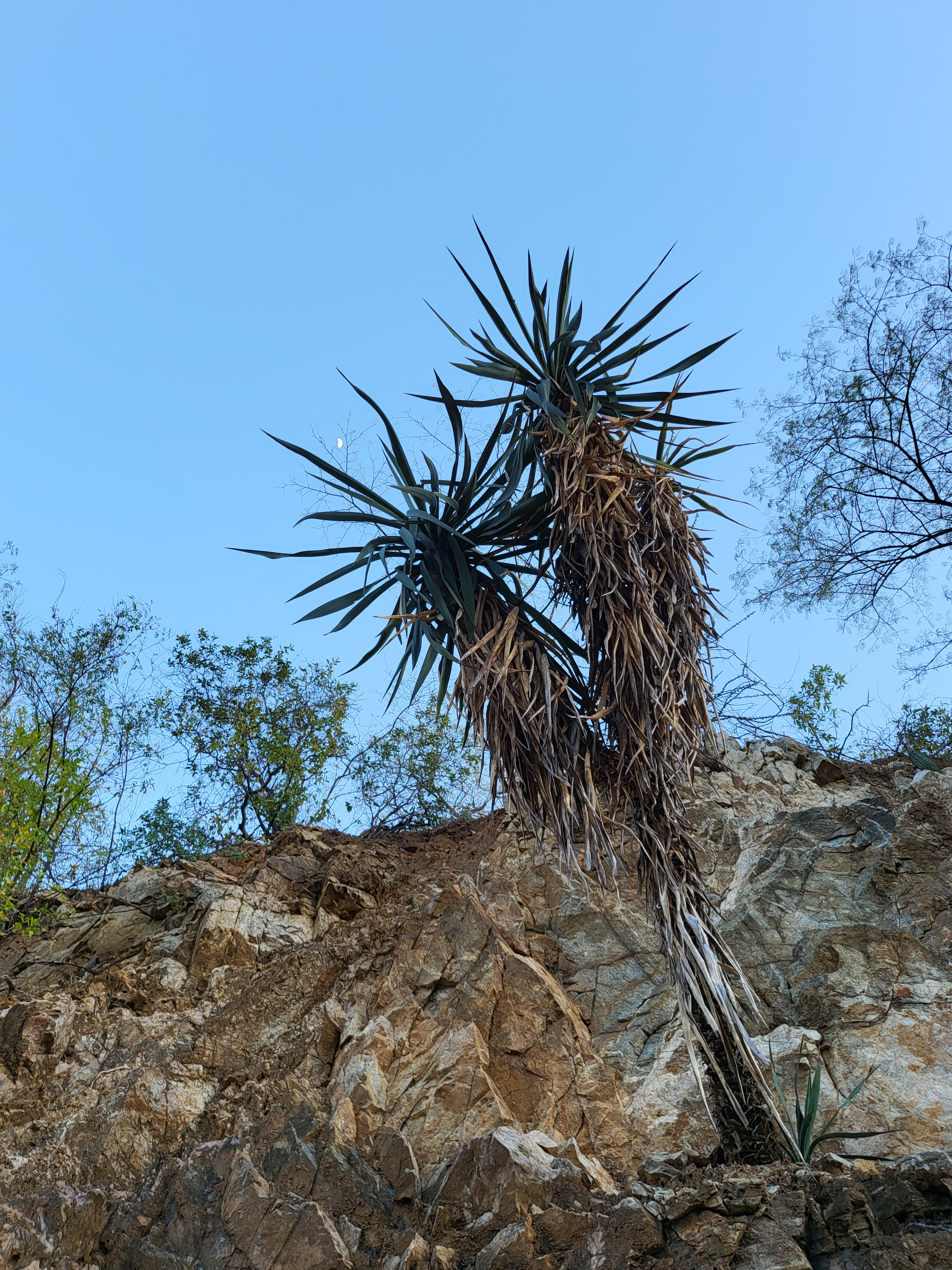

Conservation status
- Endangered (IUCN 3.1)

Scientific classification
- Kingdom: Plantae
- Clade: Tracheophytes
- Clade: Angiosperms
- Clade: Monocots
- Order: Asparagales
- Family: Asparagaceae
- Subfamily: Agavoideae
- Genus: Yucca
- Species: Y. capensis

Binomial name
- Yucca capensis Lenz

= Yucca capensis =

Cape Region Yucca

Species of flowering plant

Yucca capensis L.W.Lenz is a plant in the family Asparagaceae. It is endemic to a small region of the Mexican state of Baja California Sur It is considered to be an endangered species by the IUCN due to its small range and threats of habitat destruction. The epithet refers to the type locale is near Cabo San Lucas in the southernmost part of the peninsula. Its common name is the Cape Region yucca.

The species occurs at elevations of over 1000 m in the mountains of that region. It appears to be more closely related to the Yuccas of the Sierra Madre Occidental in Chihuahua and Sonora than it does to the Y. valida Brandegee found in other locales in Baja California Sur.
