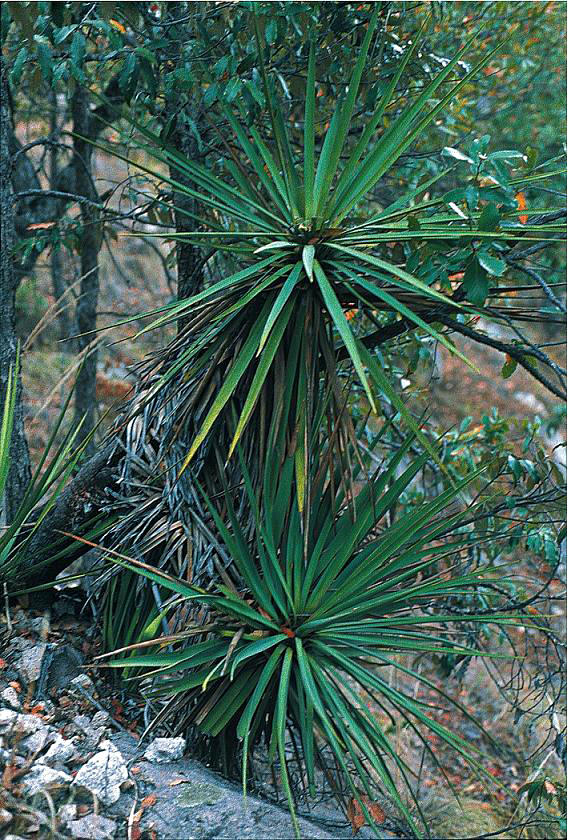

Conservation status
- Data Deficient (IUCN 3.1)

Scientific classification
- Kingdom: Plantae
- Clade: Tracheophytes
- Clade: Angiosperms
- Clade: Monocots
- Order: Asparagales
- Family: Asparagaceae
- Subfamily: Agavoideae
- Genus: Yucca
- Species: Y. madrensis

Binomial name
- Yucca madrensis H. S. Gentry

= Yucca madrensis =

Species of flowering plant

Yucca madrensis H. S. Gentry is a plant in the genus Yucca in the family Asparagaceae. It is native to a mountainous region in the Sierra Madre Occidental in the Mexican states of Sonora and Chihuahua. It has also been reported from Arizona It grows on steep, rocky slopes in pine-oak forests.

Yucca madrensis has indehiscent fruits and serrate leaves. This suggests relationships with Y. rigida Trel. and Y. schottii Engelm. It differs from both those species by several characters such as narrowness of the leaves, glabrous inflorescence, and short stature.
