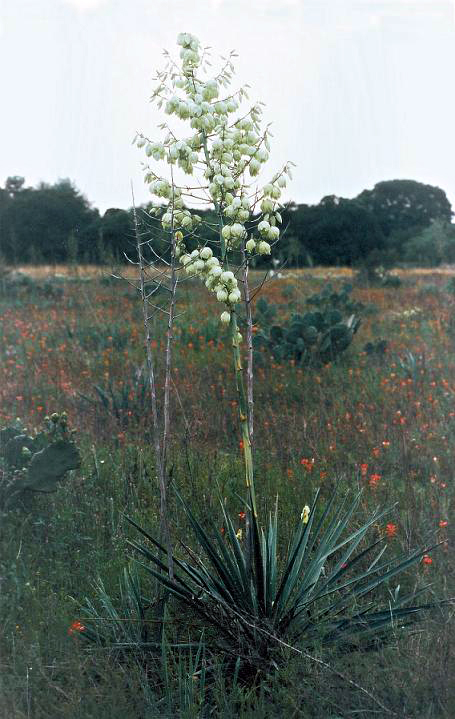

Conservation status
- Vulnerable (IUCN 3.1)

Scientific classification
- Kingdom: Plantae
- Clade: Tracheophytes
- Clade: Angiosperms
- Clade: Monocots
- Order: Asparagales
- Family: Asparagaceae
- Subfamily: Agavoideae
- Genus: Yucca
- Species: Y. coahuilensis

Binomial name
- Yucca coahuilensis Matuda & I. Piña-Luján

= Yucca coahuilensis =

Coahuila soapwort

Species of flowering plant

Yucca coahuilensis (Coahuila soapwort) is a plant in the family Asparagaceae, native to grasslands of southern Texas and northern Coahuila. It has a basal rosette of stiff, very narrow leaves, and an inflorescence up to 2.5 m (8 feet) tall, bearing creamy white flowers.
