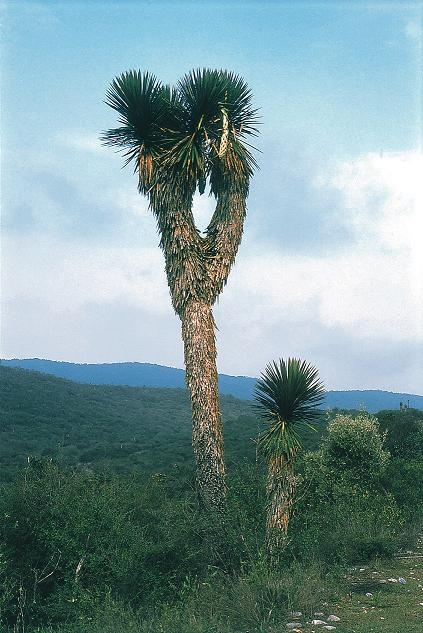

Conservation status
- Vulnerable (IUCN 3.1)

Scientific classification
- Kingdom: Plantae
- Clade: Tracheophytes
- Clade: Angiosperms
- Clade: Monocots
- Order: Asparagales
- Family: Asparagaceae
- Subfamily: Agavoideae
- Genus: Yucca
- Species: Y. potosina

Binomial name
- Yucca potosina Rzed.

= Yucca potosina =

Potosí palm soapwort Potosí palm

Species of flowering plant

Yucca potosina, English common name Potosí palm soapwort or Potosi palm, Rzed. is a plant species in the family Asparagaceae, native to the east central Mexico from Hidalgo to San Luís Potosí. It is sometimes cultivated as an ornamental, but not widely.

Yucca potosina is a rather large tree-like species up to 8 m tall, with occasional branching. Leaves are stiff, narrow, rough, up to 100 cm long. Inflorescence is up to 120 cm long. Flowers are white, elongated, up to 50 mm long and 15 mm across.
