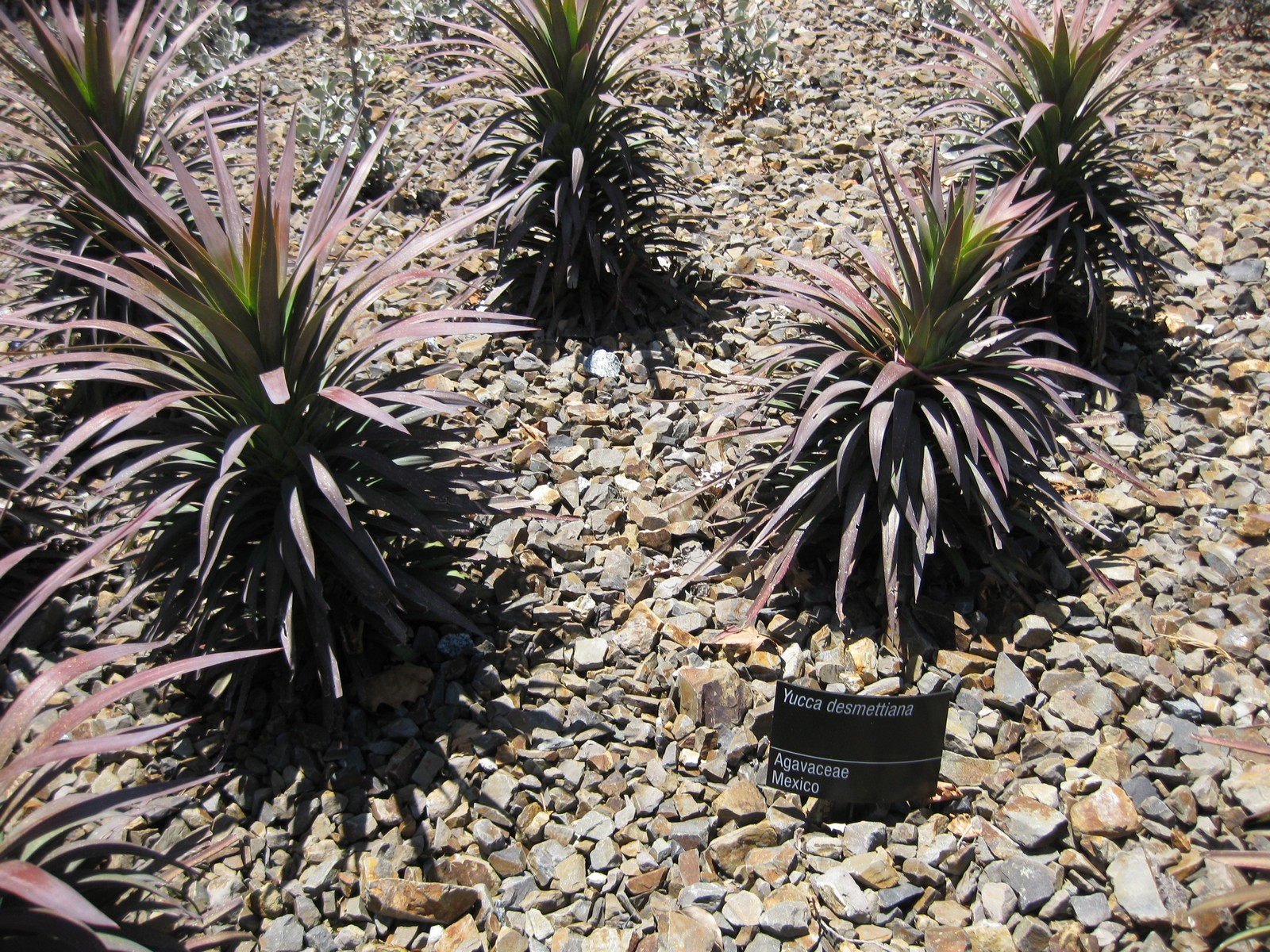

Scientific classification
- Kingdom: Plantae
- Clade: Tracheophytes
- Clade: Angiosperms
- Clade: Monocots
- Order: Asparagales
- Family: Asparagaceae
- Subfamily: Agavoideae
- Genus: Yucca
- Species: Y. desmetiana

Binomial name
- Yucca desmetiana Baker

Synonyms
- Yucca de-smetiana Baker

= Yucca desmetiana =

Species of flowering plant

Yucca desmetiana is a Mexican species of plants in the asparagus family, native to northern Mexico from Chihuahua south as far as Aguascalientes and east to San Luís Potosí and Tamaulipas.

The plant is cultivated as an ornamental in many places because of its colored foliage. Leaves are bluish-gray when young, turning burgundy as they mature. It requires little maintenance, with low water requirements. It is suitable as a garden border in sandy soil and also as a potted plant for patio or walkway.
