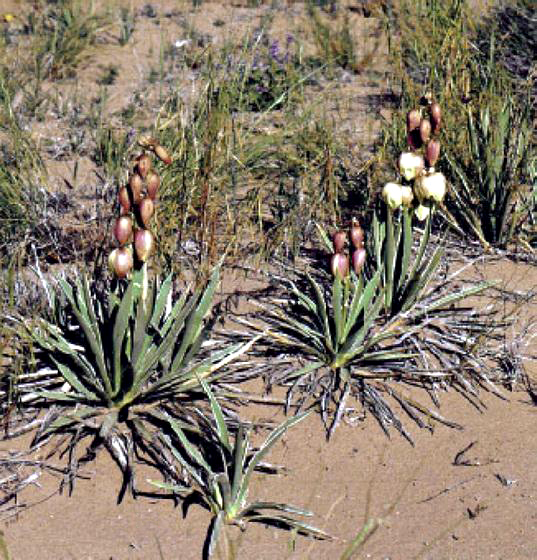

Conservation status
- Imperiled (NatureServe)

Scientific classification
- Kingdom: Plantae
- Clade: Tracheophytes
- Clade: Angiosperms
- Clade: Monocots
- Order: Asparagales
- Family: Asparagaceae
- Subfamily: Agavoideae
- Genus: Yucca
- Species: Y. sterilis

Binomial name
- Yucca sterilis (Neese & S.L.Welsh) S.L.Welsh & L.C.Higgins

Synonyms
- Yucca harrimaniae ssp. sterilis (Neese & Welsh) Hochstaetter; Yucca harrimaniae var. sterilis Neese & Welsh

= Yucca sterilis =

Species of flowering plant

Yucca sterilis is a species in the family Asparagaceae, native to the Uintah Basin region in Duchesne and Uintah Counties, Utah. It is closely related to Y. harrimaniae Trel.

Yucca sterilis is an acaulescent (trunkless) species spreading by underground rhizomes. The inflorescence is up to 40 cm (16 in) tall, with flowers white or sometimes tinged with violet along the edges of the tepals.
