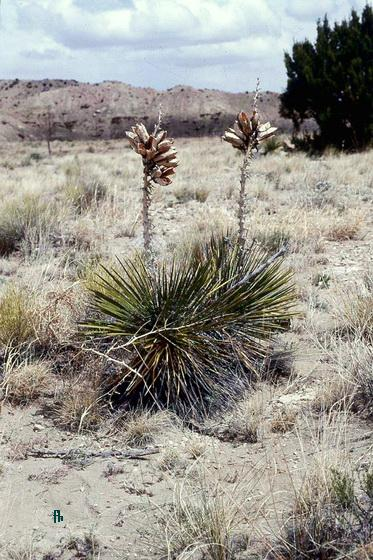

Conservation status
- Least Concern (IUCN 3.1)

Scientific classification
- Kingdom: Plantae
- Clade: Tracheophytes
- Clade: Angiosperms
- Clade: Monocots
- Order: Asparagales
- Family: Asparagaceae
- Subfamily: Agavoideae
- Genus: Yucca
- Species: Y. intermedia

Binomial name
- Yucca intermedia McKelvey

Synonyms
- Yucca baileyi var. intermedia (McKelvey) Reveal; Yucca baileyi subsp. intermedia (McKelvey) Hochstätter; Yucca intermedia var. ramosa McKelvey

= Yucca intermedia =

Species of flowering plant

Yucca intermedia McKelvey is a species in the family Asparagaceae, with the common name intermediate Yucca. It is a relatively small plant forming clumps of rosettes. It is native to dry steppes, juniper-pinyon woodlands and savannahs, and desert grassland areas of the northwestern quarter of the US State of New Mexico, then into the Four Corners region, at an elevation of 1,400–2,300 m (4,600–7,500 ft).
