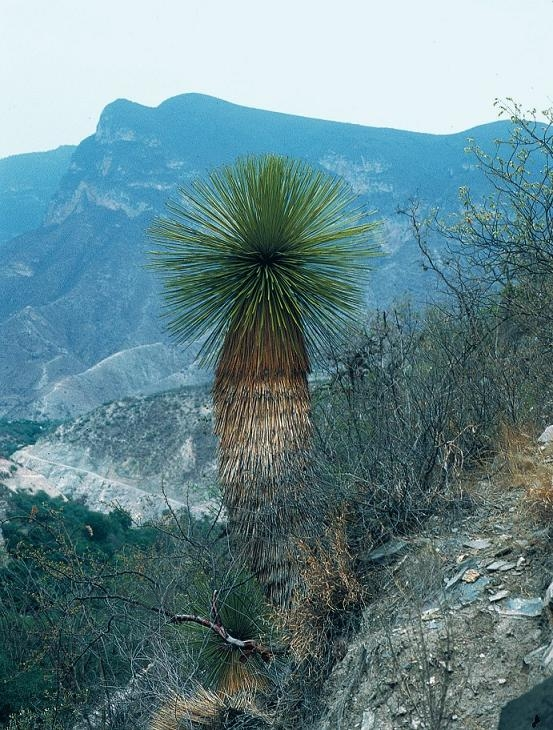

Conservation status
- Endangered (IUCN 3.1)
- CITES Appendix II (CITES)

Scientific classification
- Kingdom: Plantae
- Clade: Tracheophytes
- Clade: Angiosperms
- Clade: Monocots
- Order: Asparagales
- Family: Asparagaceae
- Subfamily: Agavoideae
- Genus: Yucca
- Species: Y. queretaroensis

Binomial name
- Yucca queretaroensis Piña-Luján

= Yucca queretaroensis =

Species of flowering plant

Yucca queretaroensis is a plant species in the genus Yucca, family Asparagaceae, native to the Sierra Madre Occidental of the Mexican states of Hidalgo, Guanajuato, and Querétaro. It is poorly known, largely because of the rugged terrain of its native habitat.

Yucca queretaroensis has a tall trunk up to 12 feet (4 m) high, with a large, prominent skirt of dead leaves hanging around the stem underneath the crown of living leaves. Leaves are very narrow, no more than 3 mm (1/8 inch) across, square in cross-section. Flowering stalks rise up to 1 m above the crown, bearing white flowers.
