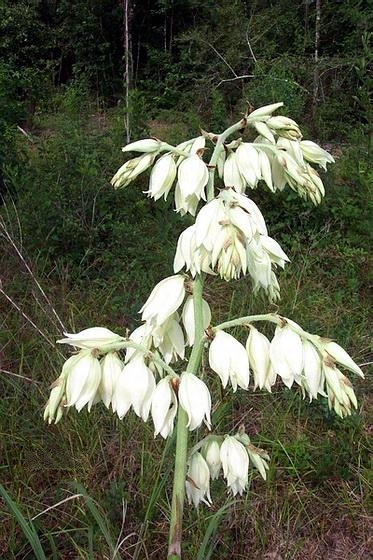

Conservation status
- Endangered (IUCN 3.1)

Scientific classification
- Kingdom: Plantae
- Clade: Tracheophytes
- Clade: Angiosperms
- Clade: Monocots
- Order: Asparagales
- Family: Asparagaceae
- Subfamily: Agavoideae
- Genus: Yucca
- Species: Y. cernua

Binomial name
- Yucca cernua E.L. Keith

= Yucca cernua =

Nodding Yucca

Species of flowering plant

Yucca cernua E.L. Keith, common name "nodding Yucca," is a rare species in the family Asparagaceae known only from a small region in Newton and Jasper Counties in eastern Texas.

The epithet "cernua" and the common name "nodding yucca" both refer to the plant's nodding flowers, i.e. appearing to hang with the center pointing downward. The species often grows in disturbed habitats such as roadsides.

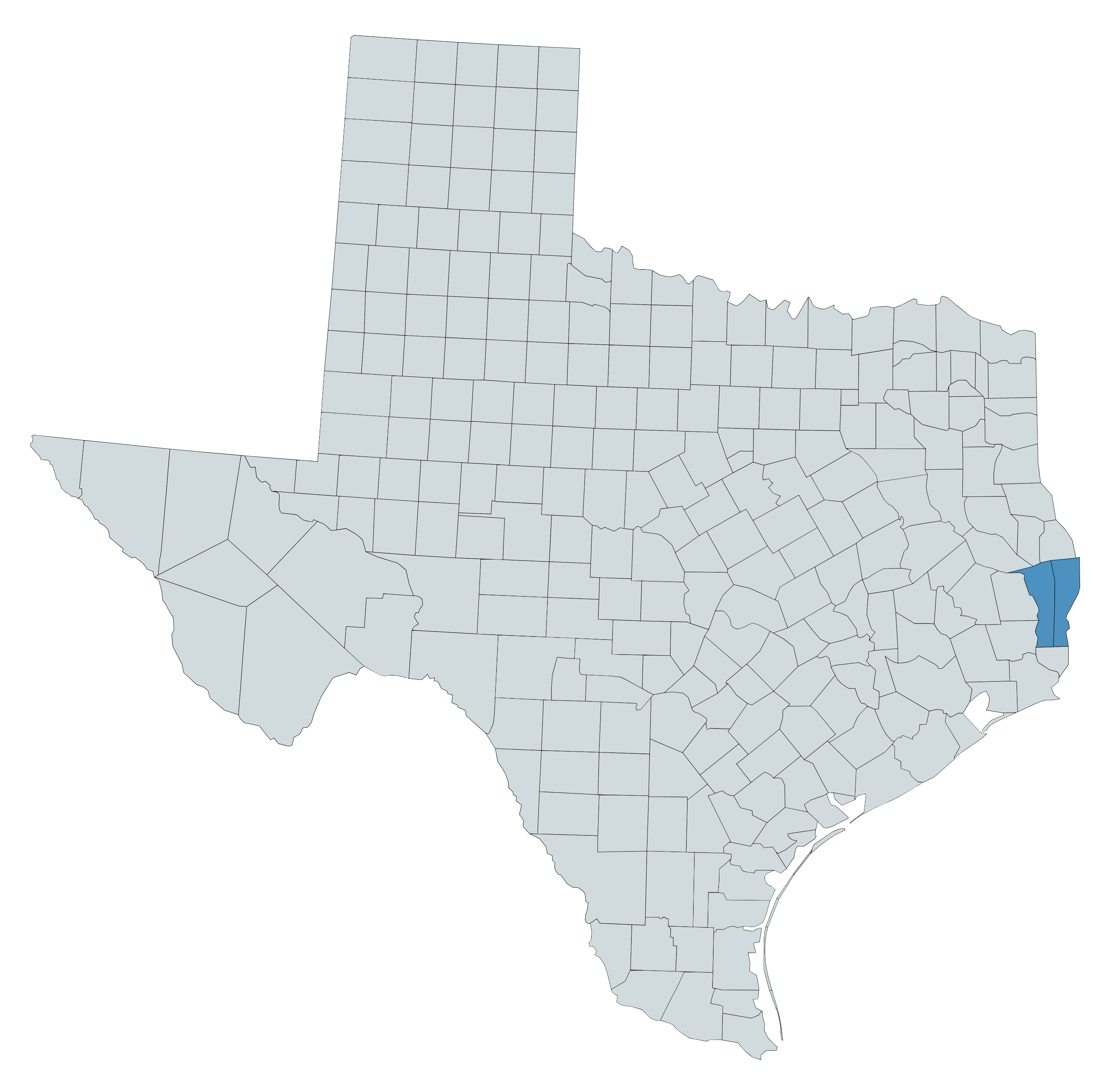
Map of Yucca cernua range in Texas
