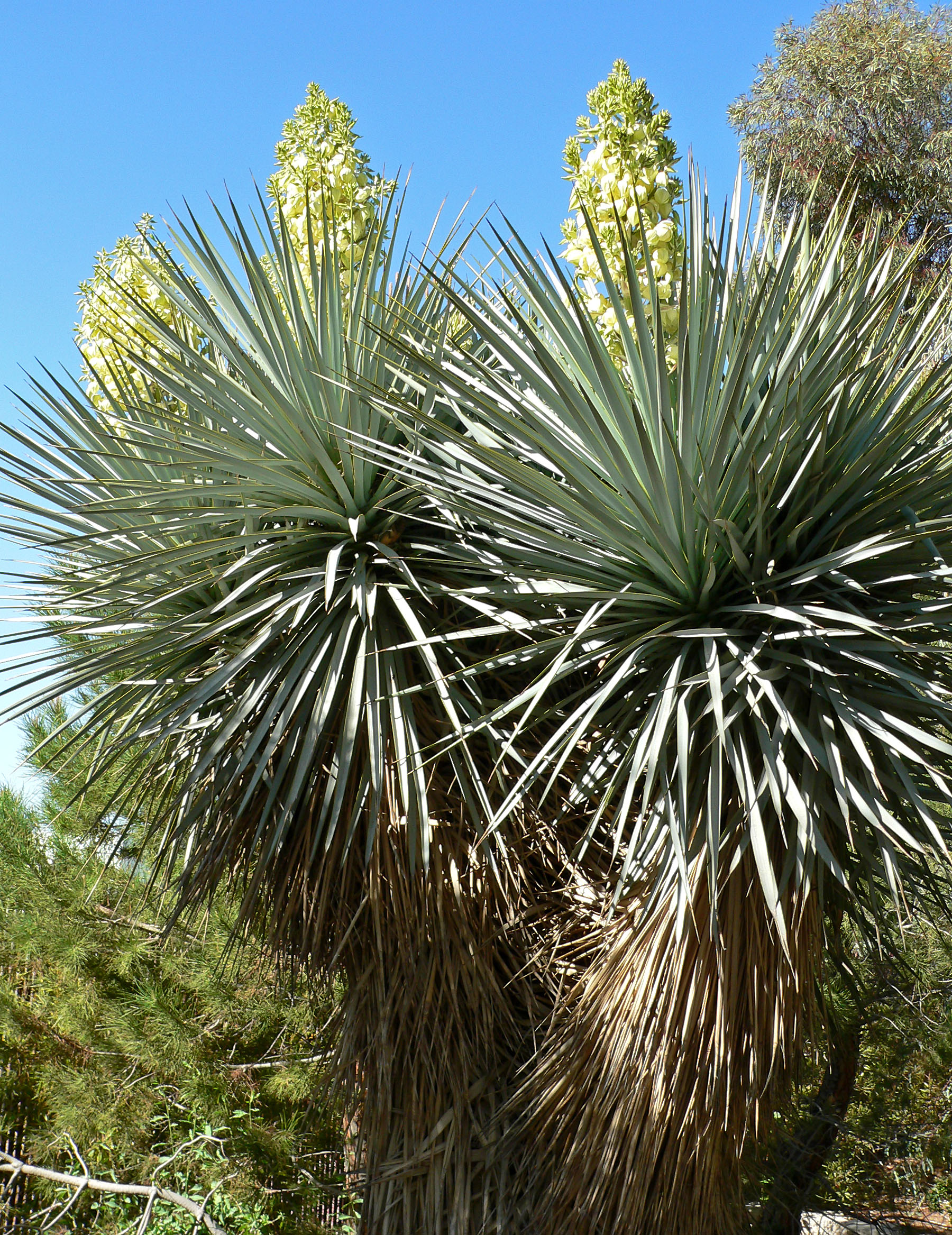

Conservation status
- Least Concern (IUCN 3.1)

Scientific classification
- Kingdom: Plantae
- Clade: Tracheophytes
- Clade: Angiosperms
- Clade: Monocots
- Order: Asparagales
- Family: Asparagaceae
- Subfamily: Agavoideae
- Genus: Yucca
- Species: Y. luminosa

Binomial name
- Yucca luminosa M.H.J.van der Meer

Synonyms
- Yucca rigida (Engelm.) Trel.; Yucca rigida var. inermis Trel.; Yucca rupicola var. rigida Engelm.

= Yucca luminosa =

Silver-leaf yucca Yucca azul Rigid blue yucca

Species of epiphyte

Yucca luminosa, more commonly referred to as its synonym Yucca rigida, is a plant species in the yucca genus native to northern Mexico. It is also commonly called silver-leaf yucca, blue yucca, and rigid blue yucca. It grows in ravines of stony soil and limestone scrubland at elevations of 1,000–2,500 metres (3,300–8,200 ft) above sea level.

Yucca luminosa usually grows individual or branched 3–4 metres (9.8–13.1 ft) tall trunks, with a crown of powdery blue leaves that grow to 1 metre (3.3 ft) long and narrowly lanceolate, tapering at both ends. It forms 1–2 metres (3.3–6.6 ft) tall inflorescences with white flowers.
