= Yucca tenuistyla =

White-rimmed yucca

Scientific classification
- Kingdom: Plantae
- Clade: Tracheophytes
- Clade: Angiosperms
- Clade: Monocots
- Order: Asparagales
- Family: Asparagaceae
- Subfamily: Agavoideae
- Genus: Yucca
- Species: Y. tenuistyla

Binomial name
- Yucca tenuistyla Trel.

Species of flowering plant

Yucca tenuistyla is a species of flowering plant in the family Asparagaceae found in brushlands near the coast of Texas, at elevations below 200 m (650 feet). Common names include white-rimmed yucca and whiterim yucca.

Yucca tenuistyla is a short, acaulescent (trunkless) species forming colonies of rosettes. Leaves can be up to 70 cm (28 inches) long but only 2 cm (0.8 inches) wide. The flowering stalk can be up to 100 cm (33 inches) tall, bearing many pendant flowers. Fruits are dry, with glossy black seeds.
