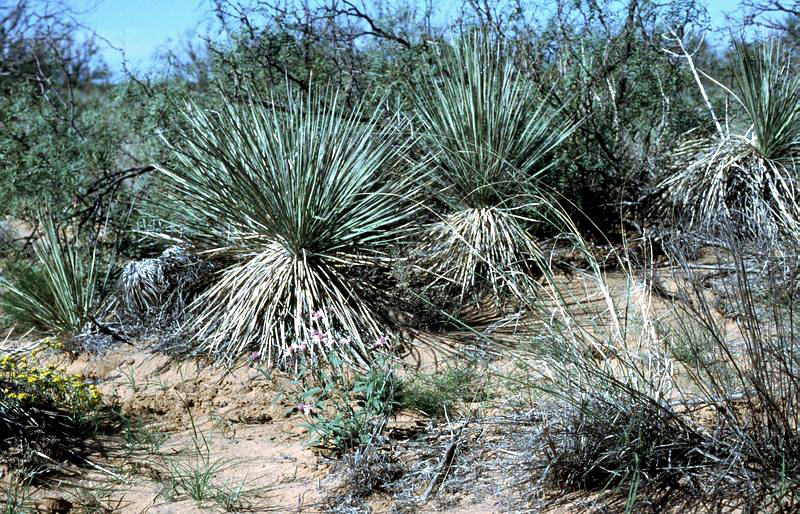

Conservation status
- Endangered (IUCN 3.1)

Scientific classification
- Kingdom: Plantae
- Clade: Tracheophytes
- Clade: Angiosperms
- Clade: Monocots
- Order: Asparagales
- Family: Asparagaceae
- Subfamily: Agavoideae
- Genus: Yucca
- Species: Y. campestris

Binomial name
- Yucca campestris McKelvey

= Yucca campestris =

Species of flowering plant

Yucca campestris, the plains yucca, is a species in the family Asparagaceae, endemic to the "panhandle" region of northwestern Texas. It is considered to be endangered, mainly due to habitat loss.

Yucca campestris is a low-growing species spreading by underground rhizomes and producing large colonies of rosettes. Leaves are long and narrow, up to 65 cm long but rarely more than 15 mm wide. Flowers are white and drooping. Fruit is a dry capsule with glossy black seeds.

Yucca campestris grows in deep sands in very dry regions. It can be grown as an ornamental in desert regions, preferring warm climates and full sunlight. The plant has blue-green leaves and panicles of showy white flowers.
