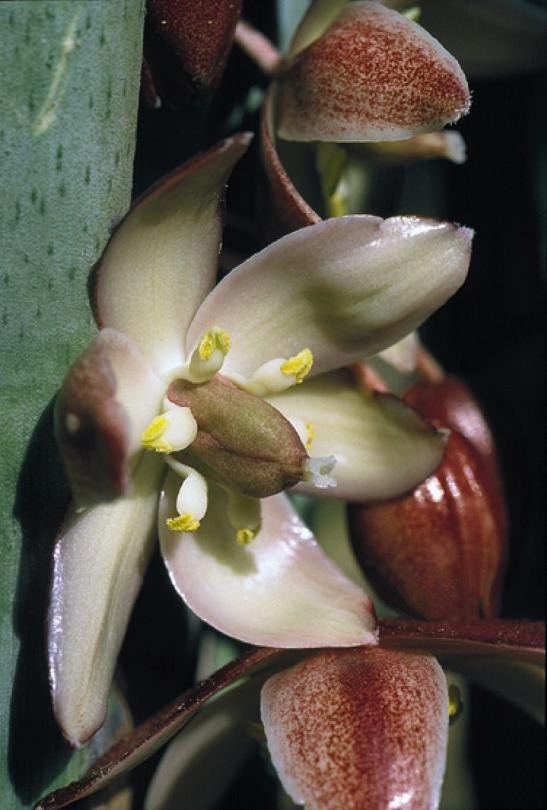

Conservation status
- Endangered (IUCN 3.1)

Scientific classification
- Kingdom: Plantae
- Clade: Tracheophytes
- Clade: Angiosperms
- Clade: Monocots
- Order: Asparagales
- Family: Asparagaceae
- Subfamily: Agavoideae
- Genus: Yucca
- Species: Y. endlichiana

Binomial name
- Yucca endlichiana Trel.

Synonyms
- Sarcoyucca endlichiana (Trel.) Lindinger

= Yucca endlichiana =

Species of flowering plant

Yucca endlichiana Trel. is a species in the family Asparagaceae, endemic to the Mexican state of Coahuila. The plant is acaulescent with creamy white to purplish flowers.

Because of its small range, as well as threats including collection of plants and seeds, overgrazing, and construction, this plant is considered to be an endangered species by the IUCN.
