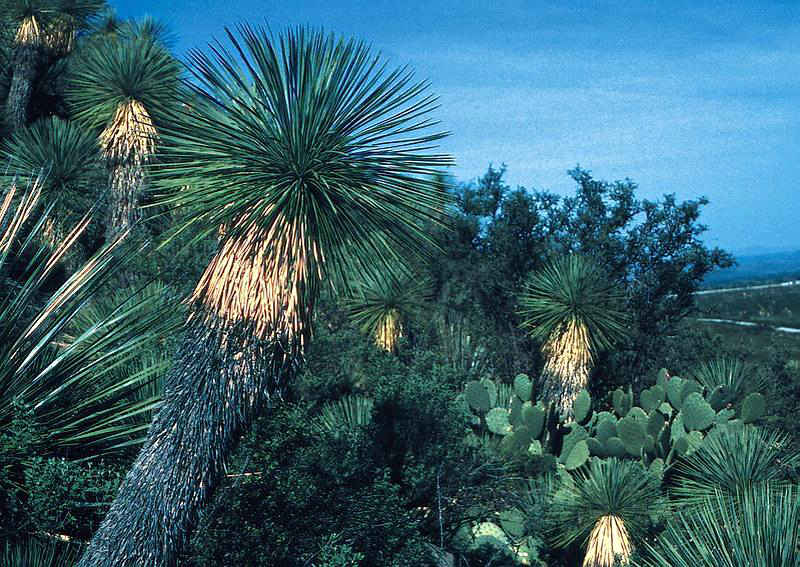

Conservation status
- Vulnerable (IUCN 3.1)

Scientific classification
- Kingdom: Plantae
- Clade: Tracheophytes
- Clade: Angiosperms
- Clade: Monocots
- Order: Asparagales
- Family: Asparagaceae
- Subfamily: Agavoideae
- Genus: Yucca
- Species: Y. linearifolia

Binomial name
- Yucca linearifolia Clary

= Yucca linearifolia =

Species of flowering plant

Yucca linearifolia is a plant species in the family Asparagaceae, native to the Chihuahuan Desert in the Mexican states of Coahuila and Nuevo Leon. It is a tree-like perennial up to 3.5 m tall, with narrow, denticulate leaves and fleshy fruits.
