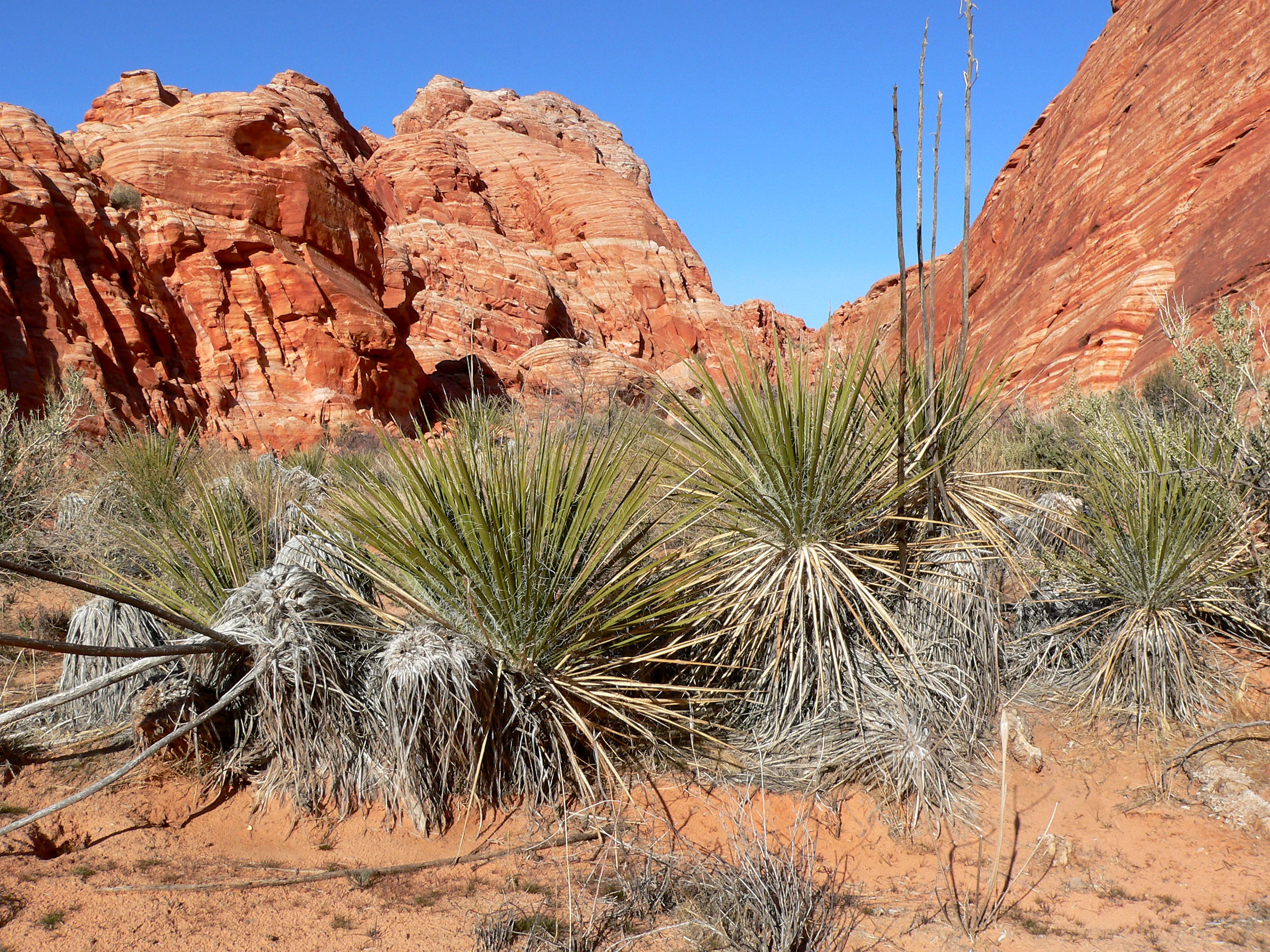

Conservation status
- Least Concern (IUCN 3.1)

Scientific classification
- Kingdom: Plantae
- Clade: Tracheophytes
- Clade: Angiosperms
- Clade: Monocots
- Order: Asparagales
- Family: Asparagaceae
- Subfamily: Agavoideae
- Genus: Yucca
- Species: Y. utahensis

Binomial name
- Yucca utahensis McKelvey

Synonyms
- Yucca elata var. utahensis (McKelvey) Reveal; Yucca elata subsp. utahensis (McKelvey) Hochstaetter

= Yucca utahensis =

Species of flowering plant

Yucca utahensis is a species in the family Asparagaceae, native to Utah, Nevada and Arizona. McKelvey

Yucca utahensis can reach a height of 10 feet (3 m), though it is usually much smaller. Stems are sometimes procumbent, often several per colony, forming colonies of several individuals. Leaves are narrow and needle-like, up to 70 cm long but rarely more than 2 cm wide, with fibers separating along the margins. Flowers are creamy white, nodding, bell-shaped. Fruit is a dry capsule with black seeds.
