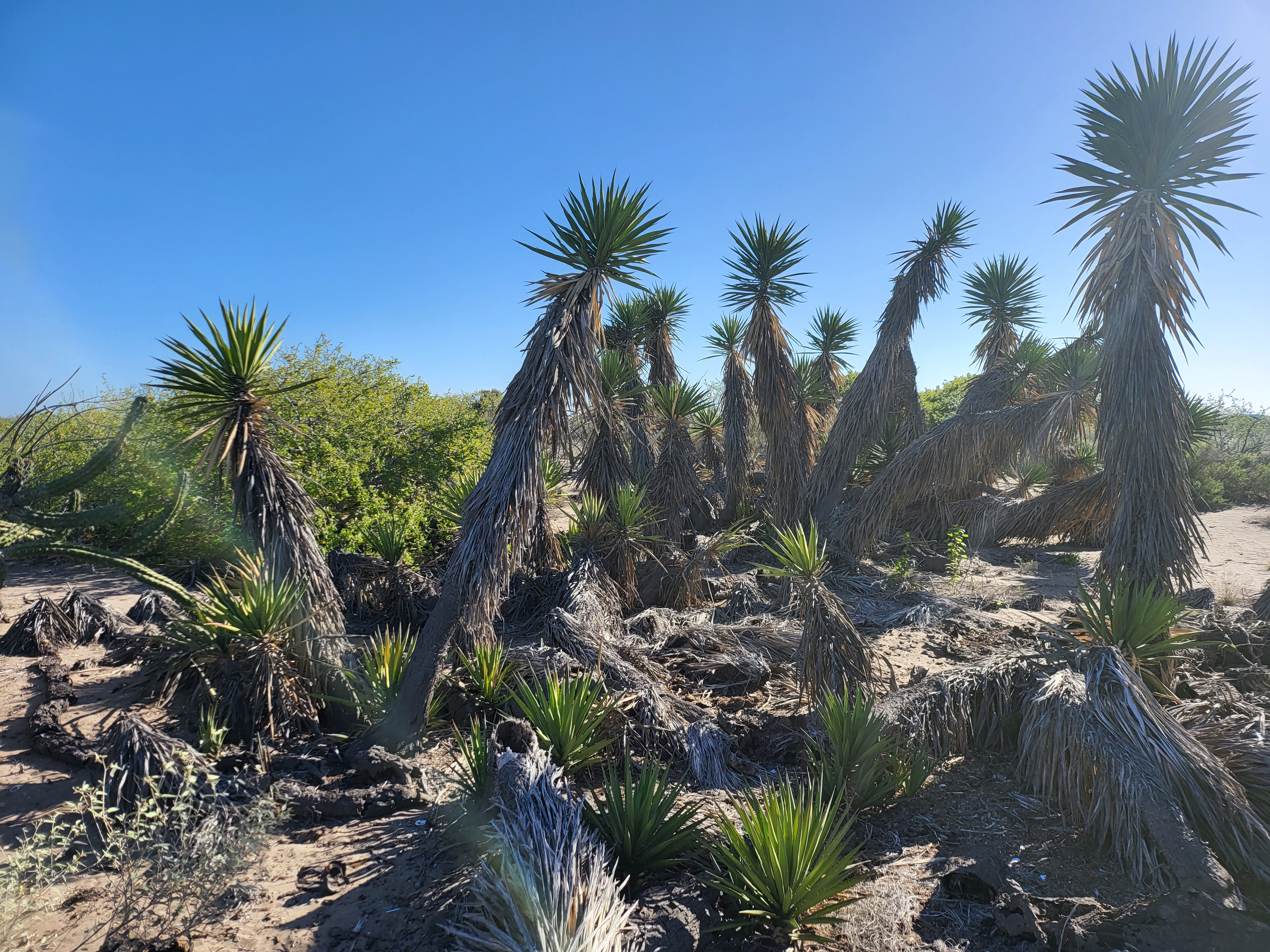

Conservation status
- Least Concern (IUCN 3.1)

Scientific classification
- Kingdom: Plantae
- Clade: Tracheophytes
- Clade: Angiosperms
- Clade: Monocots
- Order: Asparagales
- Family: Asparagaceae
- Subfamily: Agavoideae
- Genus: Yucca
- Species: Y. valida

Binomial name
- Yucca valida Brandegee

Synonyms
- Yucca × schottii var. valida (Brandegee) M.E. Jones; Sarcoyucca valida (Brandegee) Lindinger

= Yucca valida =

datilillo

Species of flowering plant

Yucca valida is a plant species in the family Asparagaceae, native to the Mexican states of Baja California, Baja California Sur, Sonora, and Sinaloa. The common name is datilillo.

Yucca valida is a large, branched species up to 7 m (23 feet) tall. Leaves are rigid and lance-like, up to 35 cm (14 inches) long. Dead leaves hang onto the plant below the living leaves, forming a skirt around the trunk. Flowers are white, forming juicy, edible black fruits up to 4.5 cm (1.8 inches) long.
