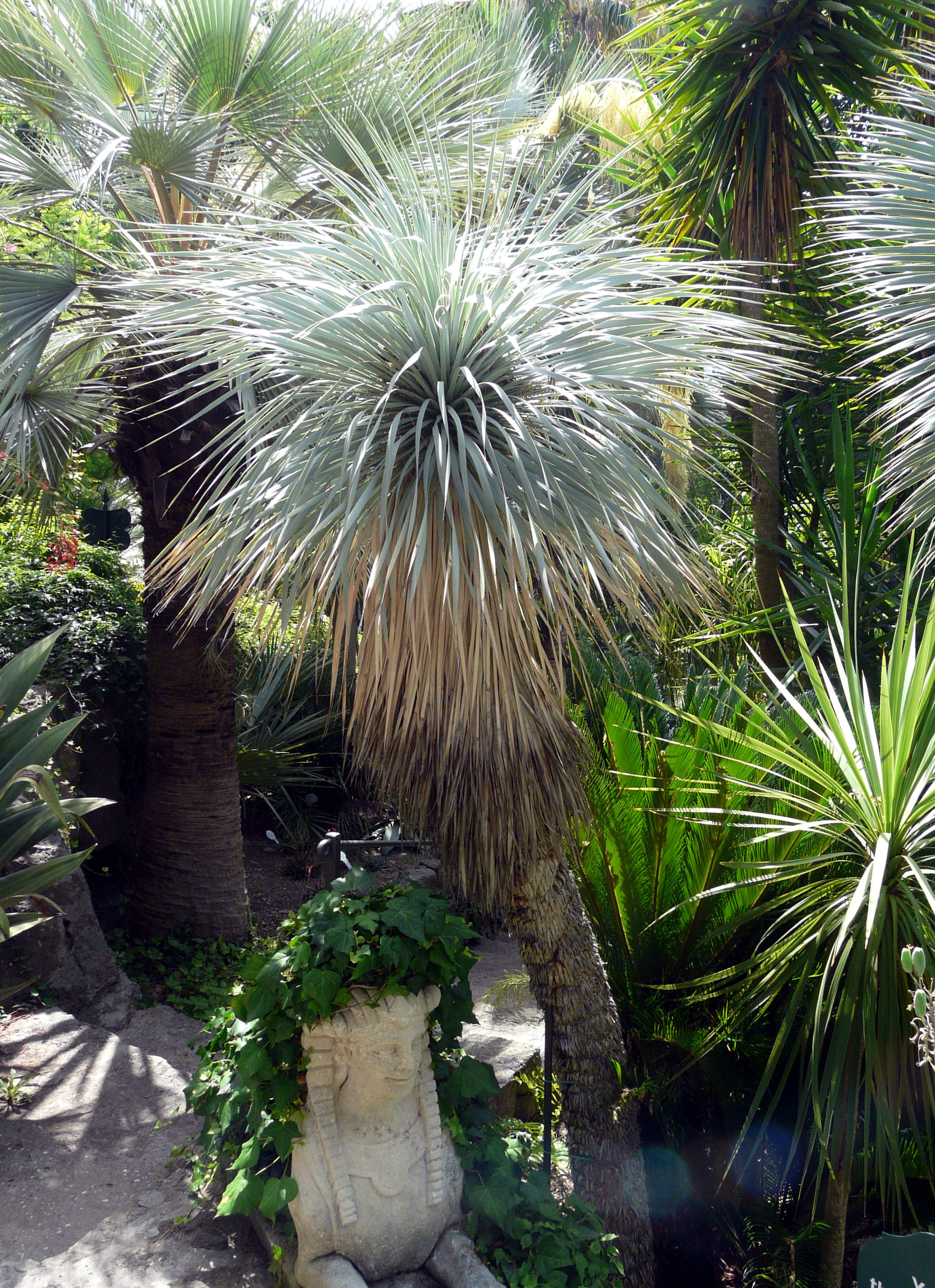
- Yucca thompsoniana in Campania

Conservation status
- Least Concern (IUCN 3.1)

Scientific classification
- Kingdom: Plantae
- Clade: Tracheophytes
- Clade: Angiosperms
- Clade: Monocots
- Order: Asparagales
- Family: Asparagaceae
- Subfamily: Agavoideae
- Genus: Yucca
- Species: Y. thompsoniana

Binomial name
- Yucca thompsoniana Trel.

Synonyms
- Yucca rostrata var. integra Trel.

= Yucca thompsoniana =

Species of flowering plant

Yucca thompsoniana, the Thompson's yucca, is a plant in the family Asparagaceae, native to Texas, Chihuahua and Coahuila. Other names for the plant include Beaked yucca, Soyate and Palmita.

Yucca thompsoniana has a trunk up to 1 m tall, branching above the ground. It flowers before there is any trunk at all, but continues to flower after the stem begins to grow. Leaves are narrow and dagger-like, a bit glaucous, up to 35 cm long and 10 mm wide. Inflorescence is a panicle about 100 cm high. Flowers are white, about 4 cm long and appear in late March through early May. Fruit is a dry, egg-shaped capsule.

The plant was first collected in Chihuahua by John Bigelow in 1852 and was described by William Trelease in 1911.
