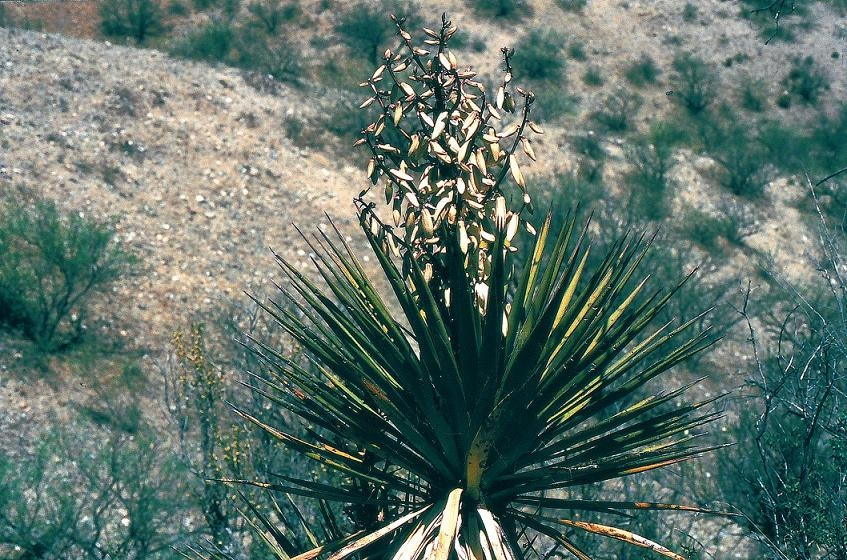

Conservation status
- Least Concern (IUCN 3.1)

Scientific classification
- Kingdom: Plantae
- Clade: Tracheophytes
- Clade: Angiosperms
- Clade: Monocots
- Order: Asparagales
- Family: Asparagaceae
- Subfamily: Agavoideae
- Genus: Yucca
- Species: Y. grandiflora

Binomial name
- Yucca grandiflora H.S. Gentry

= Yucca grandiflora =

Sahualiqui

Species of flowering plant

Yucca grandiflora Gentry is a plant in the family Asparagaceae, native to the Sierra Madre Occidental in the Mexican states of Chihuahua and Sonora.

Common names include Sahualiqui and Large-flowered Yucca. The Pima Bajo peoples of the region sometimes eat the immature fruits.

It has a wide range, although it has a very low population density where it occurs.
