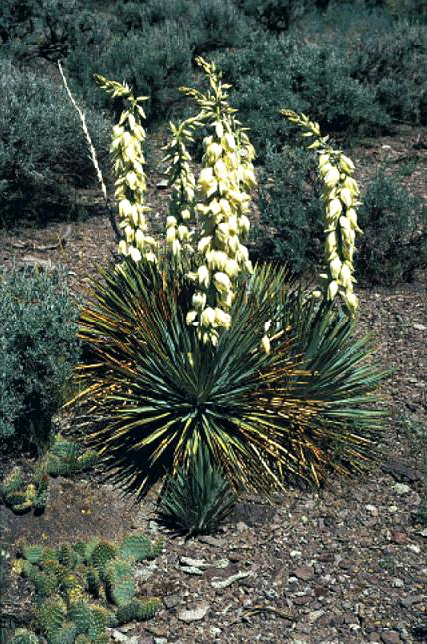

Conservation status
- Least Concern (IUCN 3.1)

Scientific classification
- Kingdom: Plantae
- Clade: Tracheophytes
- Clade: Angiosperms
- Clade: Monocots
- Order: Asparagales
- Family: Asparagaceae
- Subfamily: Agavoideae
- Genus: Yucca
- Species: Y. harrimaniae

Binomial name
- Yucca harrimaniae Trel.

Synonyms
- Yucca gilbertiana (Trel.) Rydb.; Yucca harrimaniae subsp. gilbertiana (Trel.) Hochstätter; Yucca harrimaniae var. gilbertiana Trel.; Yucca nana Hochstätter

= Yucca harrimaniae =

Species of plant

Yucca harrimaniae Trel., the Spanish bayonet, is a species in the family Asparagaceae, native to Utah, Nevada, Colorado, northeastern Arizona and northern New Mexico, at elevations from 1000 m to 2700 m.

Yucca harrimaniae is a small, acaulescent (stemless) species forming clumps of rosettes. Flowers are nodding (hanging downward), partly greenish-white, partly purplish. The species is closely related to Y. sterilis (Neese & S.L.Welsh) S.L.Welsh & L.C.Higgins..

The overall species is relatively common and widespread. Two varieties, var. nana and var. sterilis, have very small and restricted ranges.
