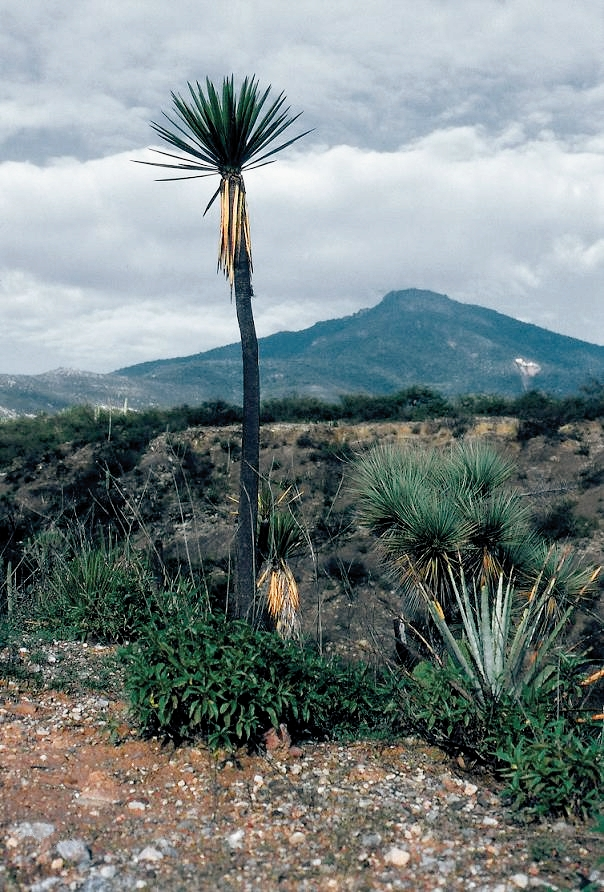

Conservation status
- Vulnerable (IUCN 3.1)

Scientific classification
- Kingdom: Plantae
- Clade: Tracheophytes
- Clade: Angiosperms
- Clade: Monocots
- Order: Asparagales
- Family: Asparagaceae
- Subfamily: Agavoideae
- Genus: Yucca
- Species: Y. mixtecana

Binomial name
- Yucca mixtecana García-Mend.

= Yucca mixtecana =

Species of flowering plant

Yucca mixtecana García-Mend. is a plant species in the family Asparagaceae, native to the Mexican states of Puebla and Oaxaca. The plant reaches a height of 6 m (20 feet), and has evergreen leaves with entire margins.
