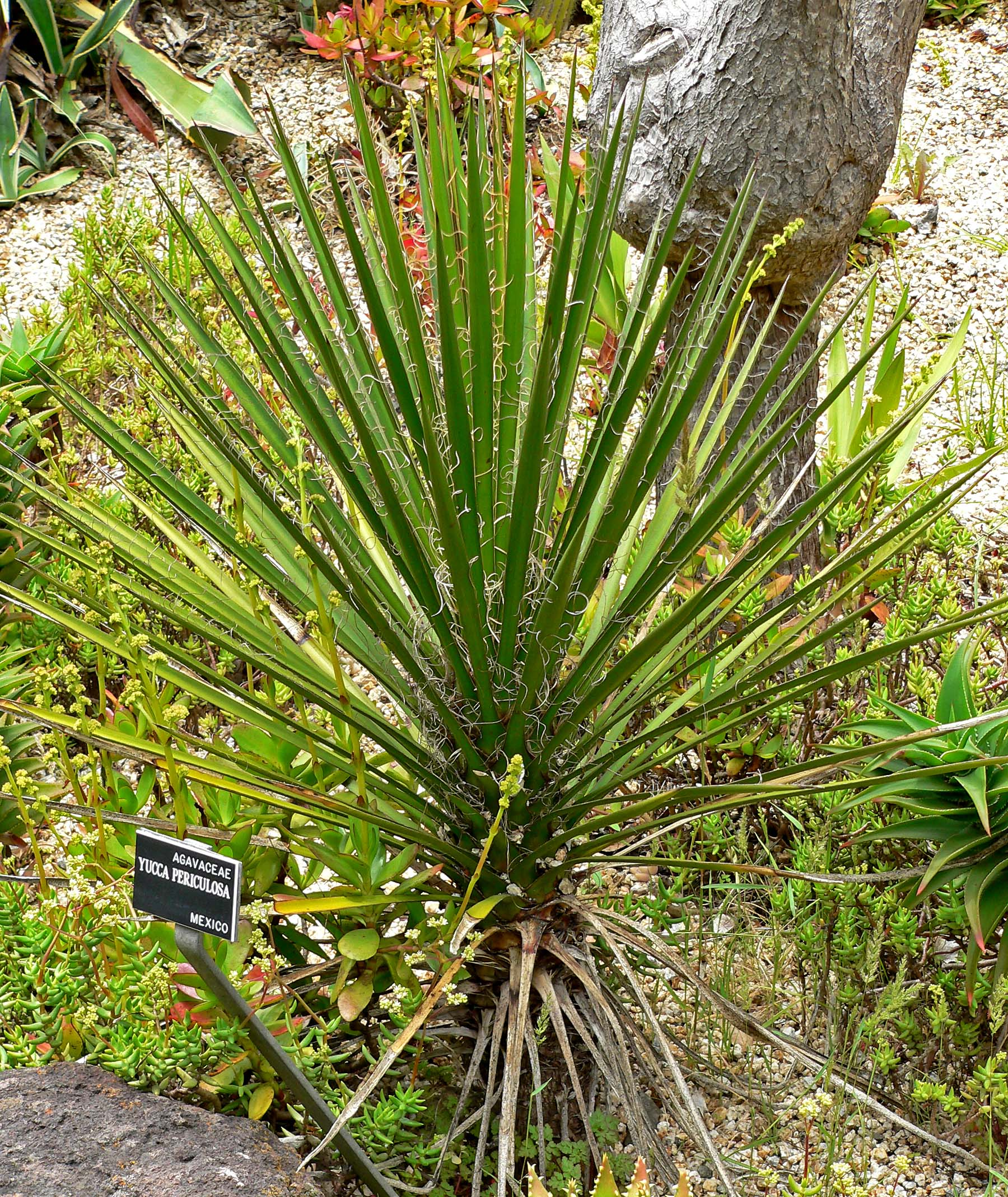

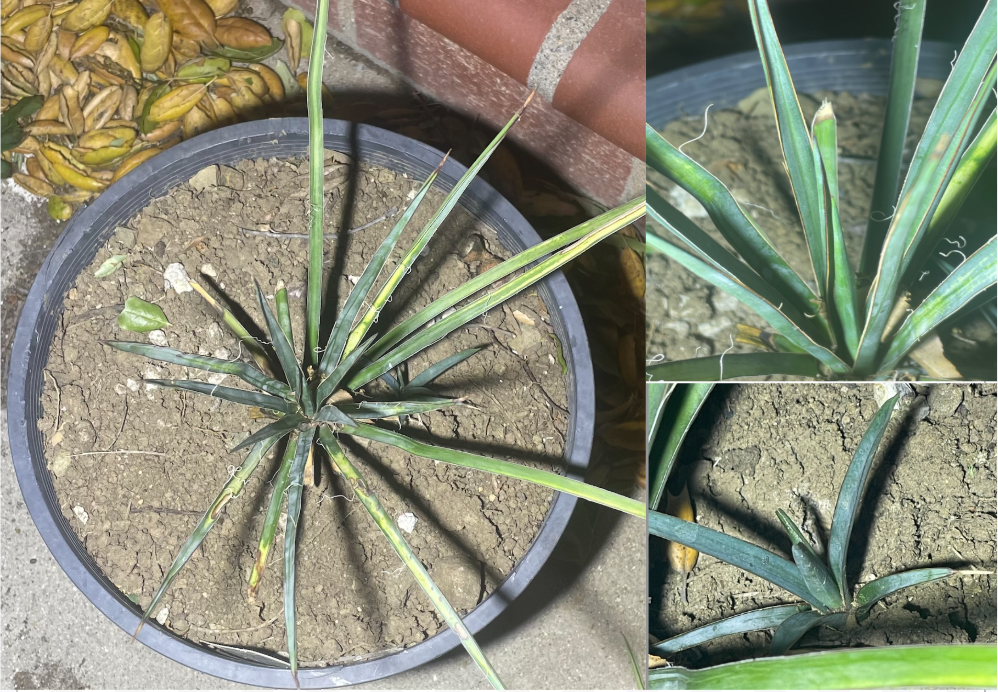

Conservation status
- Near Threatened (IUCN 3.1)

Scientific classification
- Kingdom: Plantae
- Clade: Tracheophytes
- Clade: Angiosperms
- Clade: Monocots
- Order: Asparagales
- Family: Asparagaceae
- Subfamily: Agavoideae
- Genus: Yucca
- Species: Y. periculosa

Binomial name
- Yucca periculosa Baker

Synonyms
- Yucca periculosa Baker; Yucca baccata var. periculosa (Baker) Baker; Yucca baccata forma periculosa (Baker) Voss; Sarcoyucca periculosa (Baker) Linding.; Yucca circinata Baker; Yucca baccata var. circinata (Baker) Baker

= Yucca periculosa =

Species of flowering plant

Yucca periculosa is a plant in the family Asparagaceae with the common name izote (pronounced "ee-SOH-tay"). It is native to the Mexican states of Veracruz, Morelos, Guerrero, Puebla and Oaxaca.

== Description ==
Yucca periculosa is a large, branched, arborescent species up to 15 m tall. The width of their leaves depends on their age, with older plants having longer and wider leaves than young. Leaves are long, and green or a green-teal color with white fibers more pronounced on mature plants. Older specimens (trees) may branch. On mature plants, the tips of leaves are sharp and hard but on young plants they are not as hard or sharp as a mature plant. Leaves will droop down to provide shade and prevent loss of water by covering the stem on mature plants.

== Flowers ==
This plant has creamy-white flowers. They are pollinated by yucca moths.
