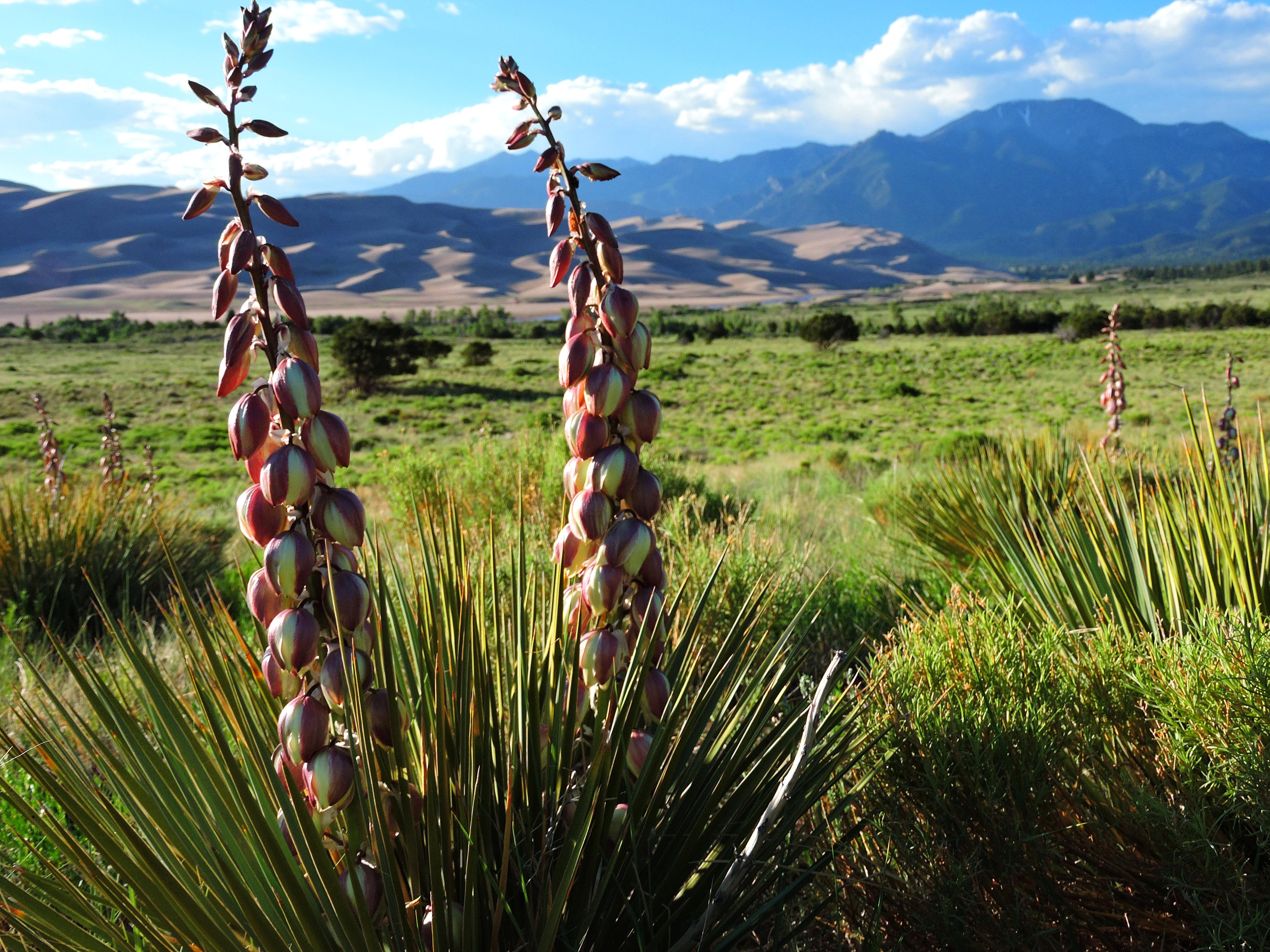
- In Great Sand Dunes National Park and Preserve

Conservation status
- Least Concern (IUCN 3.1)

Scientific classification
- Kingdom: Plantae
- Clade: Embryophytes
- Clade: Tracheophytes
- Clade: Spermatophytes
- Clade: Angiosperms
- Clade: Monocots
- Order: Asparagales
- Family: Asparagaceae
- Subfamily: Agavoideae
- Genus: Yucca
- Species: Y. angustissima

Binomial name
- Yucca angustissima Engelm. ex Trel.

= Yucca angustissima =

Yucca angustissima Narrow-leaved yucca

Species of flowering plant

Yucca angustissima, the narrowleaf yucca, is a plant in the family Agavaceae, known as the "narrow-leaved yucca". It is native to Arizona, New Mexico, Colorado and Utah, but grown elsewhere as an ornamental.

Yucca angustissima is a low-lying species forming colonies of basal rosettes up to 3 m (10 feet) in diameter. Leaves are long and thin, up to 150 cm (59 in) long but rarely more than 2 cm across. Flowers are white to cream or greenish-white, pendant, borne in racemes on stalks up to 2 m (7 feet) tall. Fruit is a dry capsule with black seeds.

Yucca angustissima is relatively abundant, and although it has local threats, its population appears to be stable overall.

== Varieties ==
Numerous varietal names have been proposed, but 4 are currently recognized:

1. Yucca angustissima var. angustissima – Arizona, Utah, New Mexico, Colorado
2. Yucca angustissima var. avia Reveal – Utah only
3. Yucca angustissima var. kanabensis (McKelvey) Reveal – Arizona and Utah
4. Yucca angustissima var. toftiae (S.L.Welsh) Reveal – Utah only
