= Yucca × schottii =

Schott's yucca

Conservation status
- Least Concern (IUCN 3.1)

Scientific classification
- Kingdom: Plantae
- Clade: Tracheophytes
- Clade: Angiosperms
- Clade: Monocots
- Order: Asparagales
- Family: Asparagaceae
- Subfamily: Agavoideae
- Genus: Yucca
- Species: Y. × schottii

Binomial name
- Yucca × schottii Engelm.

Synonyms
- Sarcoyucca schottii (Engelm.) Linding.; Yucca × brasiliensis Sprenger; Yucca × macrocarpa Engelm.; Yucca × puberula Torr., nom. illeg.

Species of flowering plant

Yucca × schottii is a plant species in the genus Yucca, native to southern Arizona, southwestern New Mexico, and the northern parts of Sonora and Chihuahua. The common names are Schott's yucca, hoary yucca, and mountain yucca. The "×" in the name indicates that this is a nothospecies, regarded as being a natural hybrid between two other species. In this case, Yucca × schottii is believed to have originated as a hybrid between Y. baccata and Y. madrensis. Yucca × schottii is firmly established and does reproduce freely in the wild.

Yucca × schottii is called mountain yucca because it is found at higher elevations than other tree-like yuccas. It occurs in the mountain ranges at the north of the Sierra Madre Occidental cordillera. It is found in extreme southeast Arizona, then the smaller bootheel region of southwest New Mexico, and the neighboring northern Mexico states of Sonora and extreme northwest Chihuahua. Most of its range, about half is in Arizona. The mountainous regions of Arizona are in the northeast Sonora Desert, as well as Sonora; the region of New Mexico–Chihuahua lies on the extreme northwest border of the Chihuahuan Desert. This specific region at the intersection of these two deserts, is a Basin and Range area, with sky islands, named the Madrean Sky Islands for the Madrean pine forests of the Sierra Madre Occidental.

Yucca × schottii is a tall species up to 5 m in height, with thin trunks rarely more than 30 cm across, branching occasionally well above ground. Leaves are lanceolate, broad and tapering at both ends, stiff and rigid, up to 60 cm long and up to 8 cm wide, with a hard spine forming the tip. Flowers are white. Fruit is fleshy and egg-shaped.

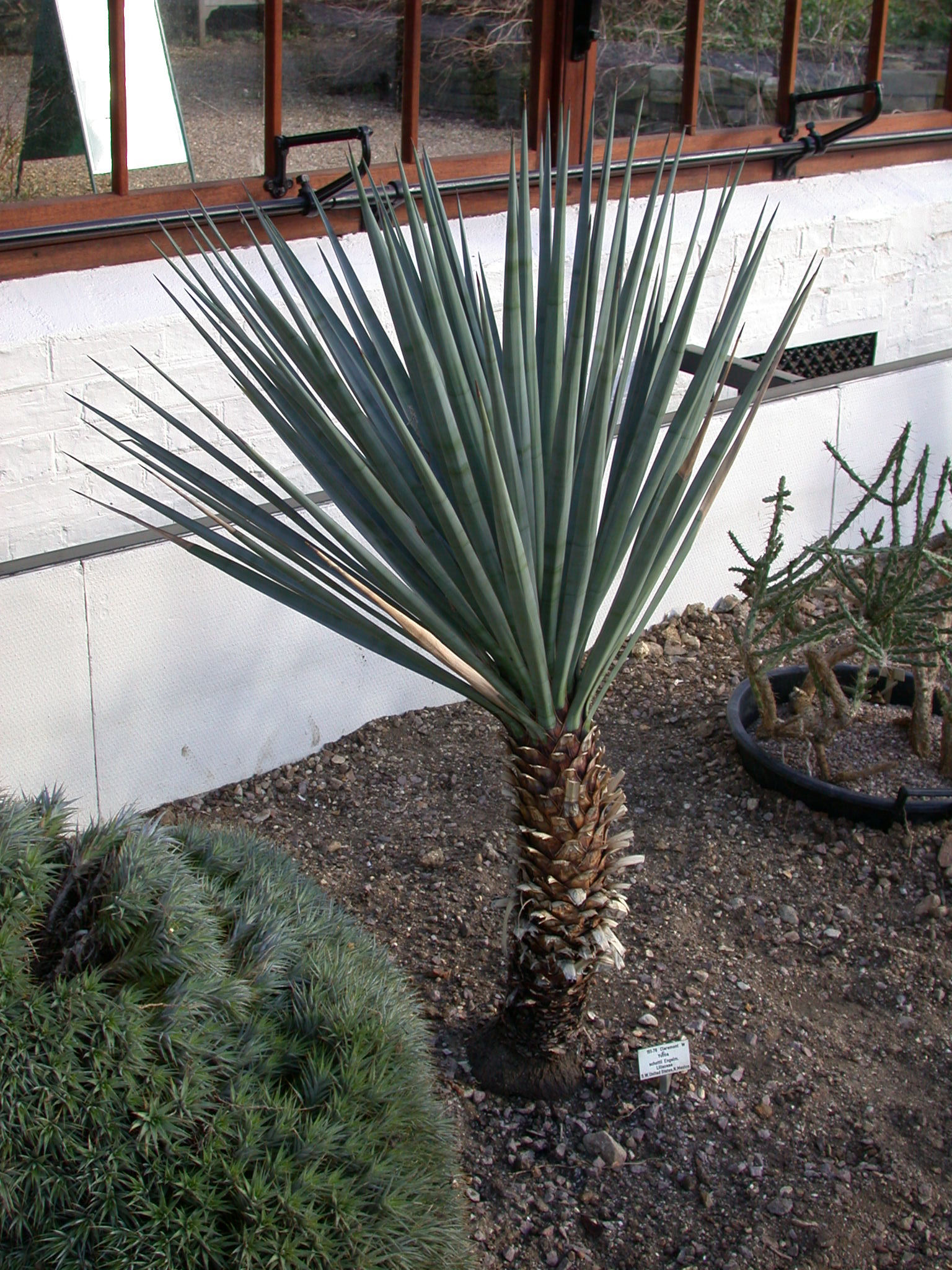
Mountain yucca
(Schott's yucca)
