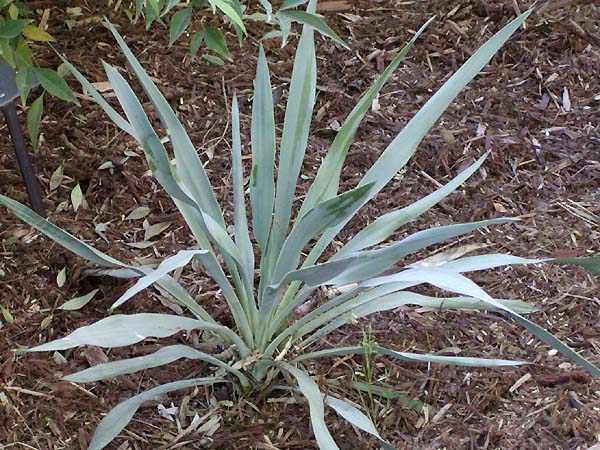

Conservation status
- Least Concern (IUCN 3.1)

Scientific classification
- Kingdom: Plantae
- Clade: Tracheophytes
- Clade: Angiosperms
- Clade: Monocots
- Order: Asparagales
- Family: Asparagaceae
- Subfamily: Agavoideae
- Genus: Yucca
- Species: Y. pallida

Binomial name
- Yucca pallida McKelvey

Synonyms
- Yucca pallida var. edentata (Trel.) Cory; Yucca rupicola var. edentata Trel.

= Yucca pallida =

Pale yucca

Species of flowering plant

Yucca pallida, sometimes called pale yucca, is a species of yucca native to Northern Mexico and parts of the blackland prairies of northern and central Texas, and notable for its light-colored leaves that range from a pale blue-gray to sage-green in color.

The rosettes average 20–50 cm tall and 30–80 cm in diameter, with leaves 15–40 cm long and 2–3 cm wide, being widest around the midpoint. The rosettes sit directly on the ground, with little or no trunk. The leaves have a yellow to brown terminal spine, and are generally flat, possibly with some waviness or rolling along the edges. The inflorescence is a panicle, 1–2.5 m tall, with up to 100 bell-shaped flowers, each 5–7 cm long, with color ranging from light green to cream.

Yucca pallida is known to hybridize with Yucca rupicola Scheele, which has a similar appearance, but whose leaves are more twisted and curved.

Although not common in horticulture, its color, size, and moderate hardiness (down to −18 °C or 0 °F) make it a good gardening alternative to other species of yuccas.
