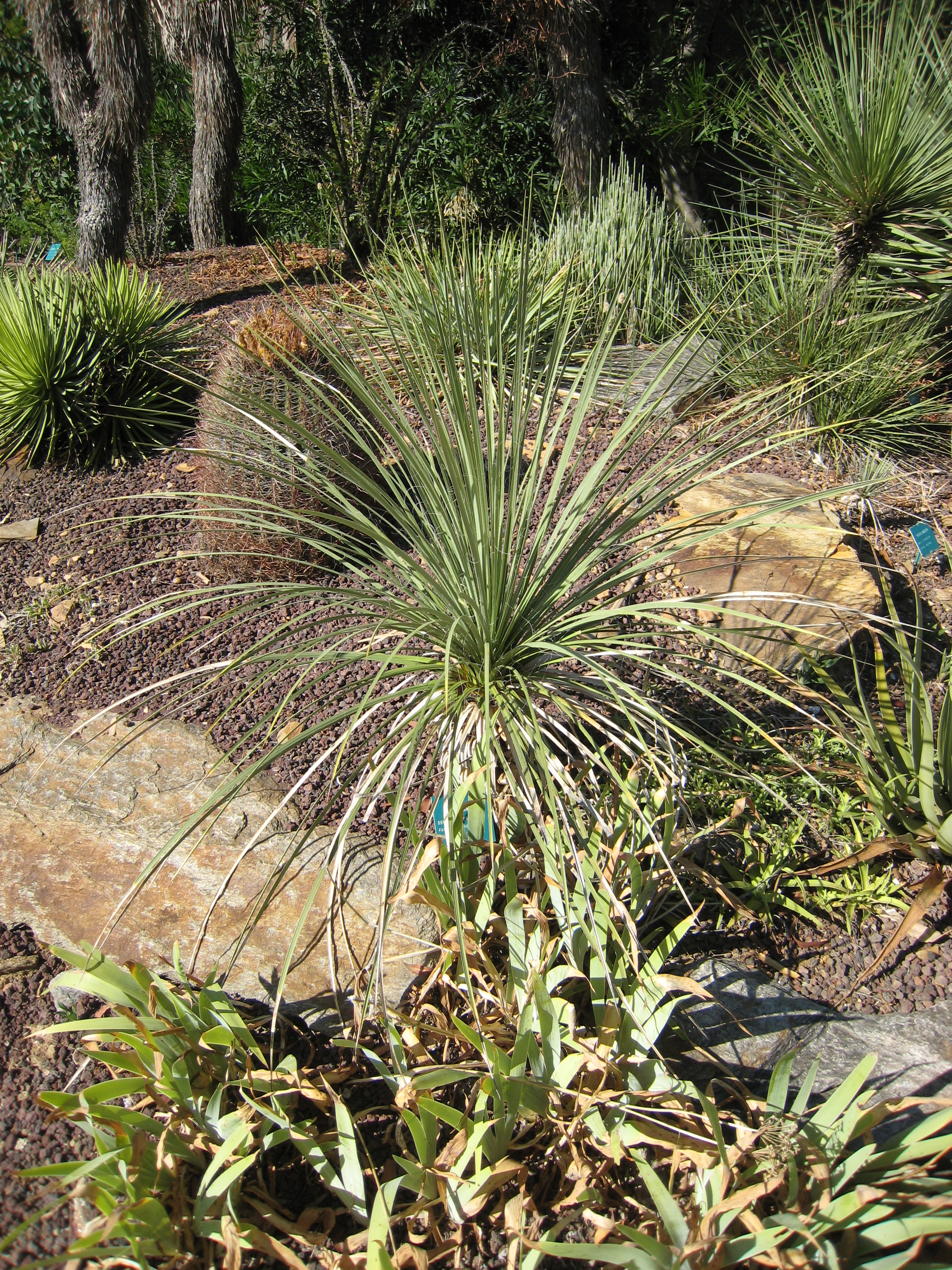
- Yucca baileyi ssp. intermedia

Conservation status
- Least Concern (IUCN 3.1)

Scientific classification
- Kingdom: Plantae
- Clade: Tracheophytes
- Clade: Angiosperms
- Clade: Monocots
- Order: Asparagales
- Family: Asparagaceae
- Subfamily: Agavoideae
- Genus: Yucca
- Species: Y. baileyi

Binomial name
- Yucca baileyi Woot. & Standl.

Synonyms
- Yucca baileyi var. navajoa (J.M.Webber) J.M.Webber; Yucca intermedia var. ramosa McKelvey; Yucca navajoa Webber; Yucca standleyi McKelvey

= Yucca baileyi =

Navajo yucca

Species of flowering plant

Yucca baileyi is a plant in the family Agavaceae. It is native to Utah, Arizona, New Mexico and Colorado but has been cultivated elsewhere. Much of its native range is within the boundaries of the Navajo (Diné) Reservation, hence the common name "Navajo yucca." The Navajo people make extensive use of yucca fibers to make a wide assortment of useful and ceremonial items. They also use the roots as soap. It is not considered to be threatened, as it has a large range and an overall stable population.

Yucca baileyi is a relatively small species, usually acaulescent but sometimes with a short leafy stem. It can produce as many as 15 rosettes. Flowering stalk is up to 150 cm tall, with greenish-white to slightly purplish flowers.
