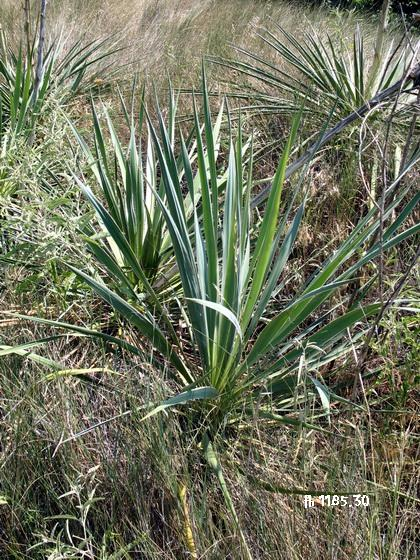

Conservation status
- Least Concern (IUCN 3.1)

Scientific classification
- Kingdom: Plantae
- Clade: Embryophytes
- Clade: Tracheophytes
- Clade: Spermatophytes
- Clade: Angiosperms
- Clade: Monocots
- Order: Asparagales
- Family: Asparagaceae
- Subfamily: Agavoideae
- Genus: Yucca
- Species: Y. arkansana

Binomial name
- Yucca arkansana Trel.

Synonyms
- Yucca angustifolia var. mollis Engelm.; Yucca mollis (Engelm.) Cocker.; Yucca glauca var. mollis (Engelm.) Brann. & Cov.; Yucca arkansana var. paniculata McKelvey

= Yucca arkansana =

Species of flowering plant

Yucca arkansana, the Arkansas yucca, is a plant in the family Asparagaceae, native to Texas, Oklahoma, Arkansas, Missouri and Kansas. It generally grows in gravelly, sunlit locations such as rocky outcrops, prairies, etc. It is not considered to be threatened.

Yucca arkansana is one of the smaller members of the genus Yucca, acaulescent or with a stem no more than 76 cm tall. Flowers are greenish-white, borne on a flowering stalk up to 180 cm (72 inches) tall.

A number of yucca moths lay their eggs upon Y. arkansana as a host plant, an example being Tegeticula intermedia.
