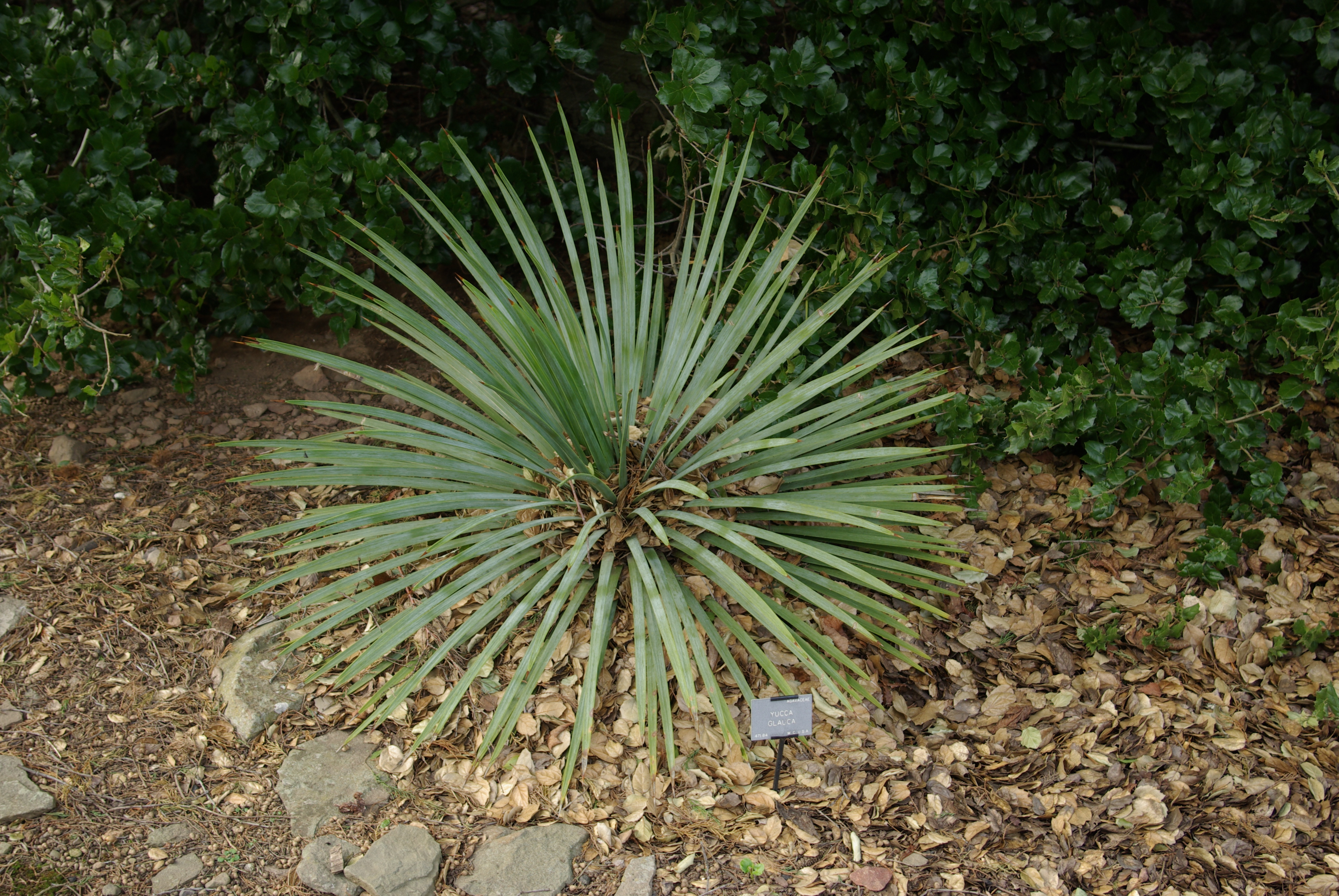

Conservation status
- Least Concern (IUCN 3.1)

Scientific classification
- Kingdom: Plantae
- Clade: Tracheophytes
- Clade: Angiosperms
- Clade: Monocots
- Order: Asparagales
- Family: Asparagaceae
- Subfamily: Agavoideae
- Genus: Yucca
- Species: Y. glauca

Binomial name
- Yucca glauca Nuttall

Synonyms
- Yucca angustifolia Pursh.; Yucca glauca var. gurneyi McKelvey; Yucca glauca subsp. stricta (Sims) Hochstätter; Yucca stenophylla Steud.; Yucca stricta Sims

= Yucca glauca =

Great Plains yucca

Species of flowering plant

Yucca glauca (syn. Yucca angustifolia) is a species of perennial evergreen plant, adapted to xeric (dry) growth conditions. It is also known as small soapweed, soapweed yucca, Spanish bayonet, and Great Plains yucca.

Yucca glauca forms colonies of rosettes. Leaves are long and narrow, up to 60 cm long but rarely more than 12 mm across. Inflorescence is up to 100 cm tall, sometimes branched sometimes not. Flowers are pendent (drooping, hanging downward), white to very pale green. Fruit is a dry capsule with shiny black seeds.

== Distribution ==
Yucca glauca is native to central North America: occurring from the Canadian Prairies of Alberta and Saskatchewan in Canada; south through the Great Plains to Texas and New Mexico in the United States.

== Pollinators ==
The "honey ant" (Myrmecocystus mexicanus), among other species, has been observed collecting nectar from Y. glauca.

Yucca species are dependent on pollination by yucca moths, species in the genus Tegeticula and genus Parategeticula. In turn the moths are dependent on yucca seeds as food for their larvae. This relationship was first scientifically observed by the botanist George Engelmann and entomologist Charles Valentine Riley in 1872 and has been the subject of many observations and experiments since then.

When the bright white yucca flowers are in bloom, the female yucca moth visits a flower and collects a bundle of pollen. Though it is in the best interest of the plant that she then leaves to visit another plant, around two thirds of the time she visits a flower on the same inflorescence or even the same flower with the pollen collected when observed on Yucca filamentosa. Female yucca moths can smell if another moth has visited a bloom and prefer ones that have not been visited. This behavior is influenced by the plant because when moths lay too many eggs in a flower's ovary, the plant will abort the pod killing the moth's young. When a female lays eggs in the ovary of the flower, she then immediately climbs to the stigma and fertilizes the flower with pollen gathered previously to ensure food for her larvae. If this exhausts her load of pollen she then goes to gather more before moving on again to investigate more flowers as potential sites to lay more eggs.

The specific species of yucca moth known to visit Yucca glauca flowers is Tegeticula yuccasella. This species is also known to visit Yucca filamentosa.

== Uses ==
Soapweed yucca was a traditional Native American medical plant, used by the Blackfoot, Cheyenne, Lakota, and other tribes.

Among the Zuni people, the seed pods are boiled and used for food. Leaves are made into brushes and used for decorating pottery, ceremonial masks, altars and other objects. Leaves are also soaked in water to soften them and made into rope by knotting them together. Dried leaves are split, plaited and made into water-carrying head pads. Leaves are also used for making mats, cincture pads and other articles. The peeled roots are pounded, made into suds and used for washing the head, wool garments and blankets.

The young flower stalks and unripe fruits can be cooked and eaten.

Yucca glauca is desirable as a landscaping plant, particularly for low water and high altitude gardens. It is an excellent choice for Xeriscaping. Not only do this hardy perennial's showy leaves make a striking display, but it is also cold hardy and drought tolerant. Its bell shaped flowers, typically cream colored, grow on tall spikes. This plant blooms in the summer. Yucca glauca is deer resistant. This plant can be propagated from seed that has been winterized, from root cuttings, and from stem cuttings. The tops of the leaves are needle sharp and must be handled with care. It is wise to plant them away from areas that are commonly traversed.

== Gallery ==
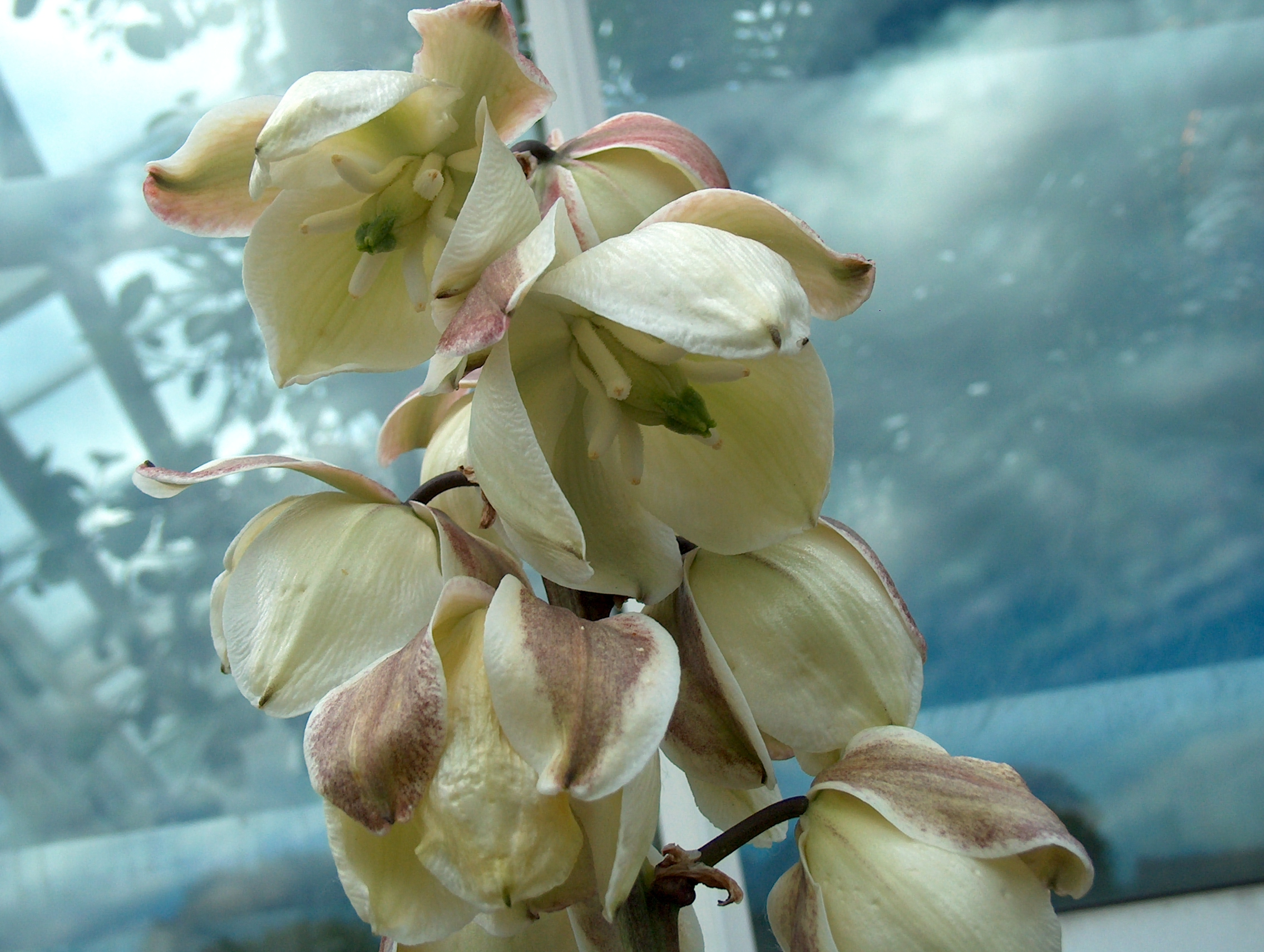
Yucca glauca flowers

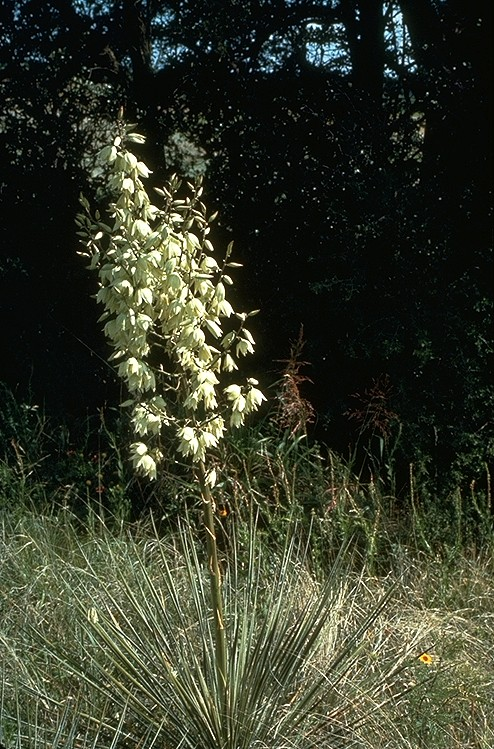
Inflorescence
