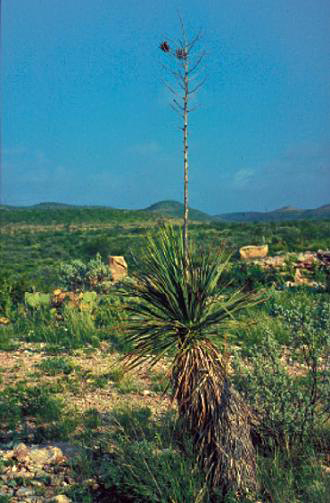

Conservation status
- Least Concern (IUCN 3.1)

Scientific classification
- Kingdom: Plantae
- Clade: Tracheophytes
- Clade: Angiosperms
- Clade: Monocots
- Order: Asparagales
- Family: Asparagaceae
- Subfamily: Agavoideae
- Genus: Yucca
- Species: Y. constricta

Binomial name
- Yucca constricta Buckley

Synonyms
- Yucca albospica Van Houtte; Yucca polyphylla Baker

= Yucca constricta =

Species of flowering plant

Yucca constricta known by the common name "Buckley's yucca," is a plant in the family Asparagaceae. It is found in rocky limestone hills of central Texas, and also in Coahuila, Mexico.

Yucca constricta is usually acaulescent (trunkless), sometimes growing in clumps, spreading by trailing stems. Flowering stalks reach as high as 50 cm (20 inches) with pendent, greenish-white flowers. Fruit is a dry capsule with shiny black seeds.

Yucca constricta is relatively abundant, and although it has local threats, its population appears to be stable overall.
