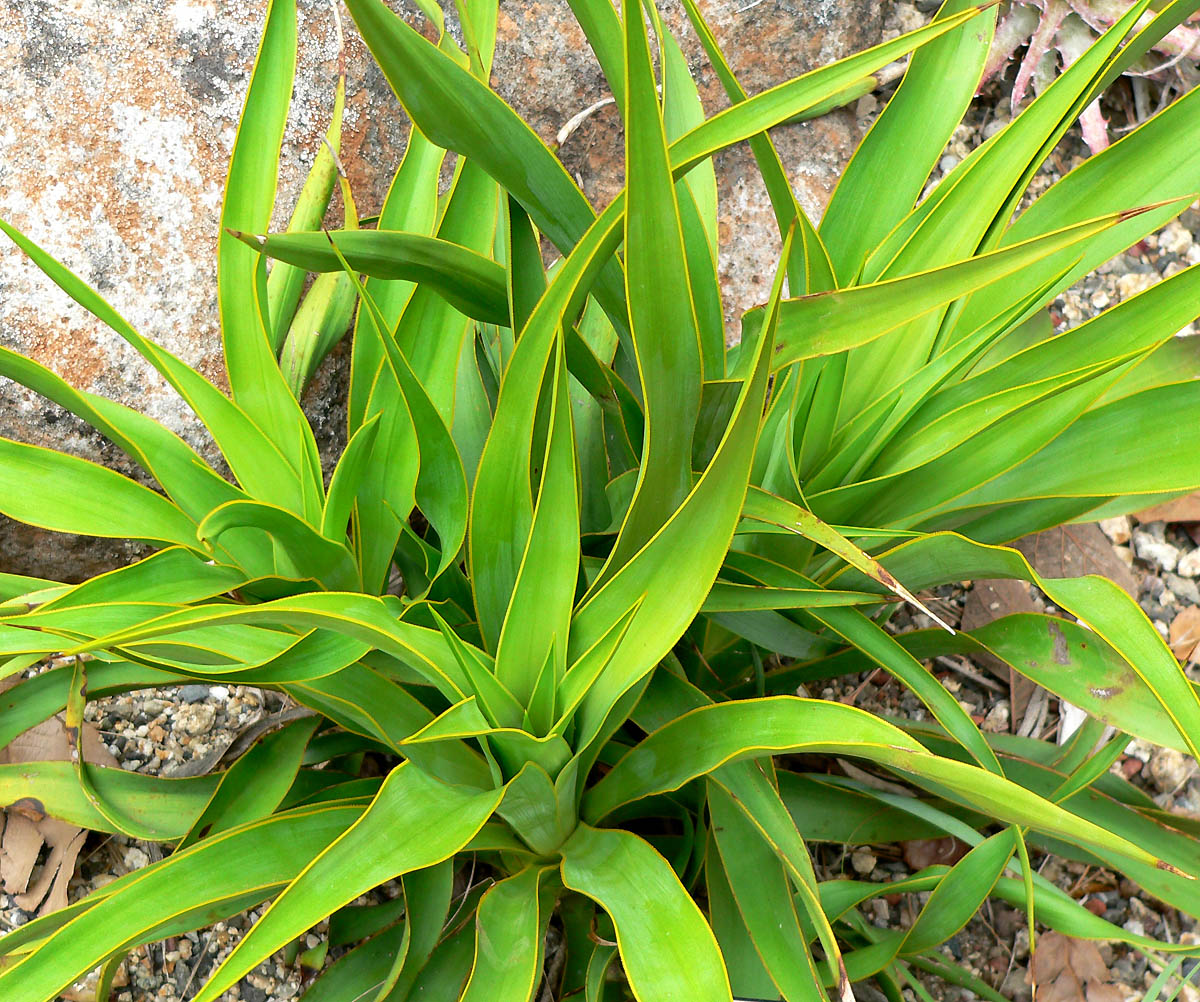

Conservation status
- Least Concern (IUCN 3.1)

Scientific classification
- Kingdom: Plantae
- Clade: Tracheophytes
- Clade: Angiosperms
- Clade: Monocots
- Order: Asparagales
- Family: Asparagaceae
- Subfamily: Agavoideae
- Genus: Yucca
- Species: Y. rupicola

Binomial name
- Yucca rupicola Scheele

Synonyms
- Yucca lutescens Carrière; Yucca rupicola var. tortifolia Engelm.; Yucca tortifolia Lindh. ex Torr.; Yucca tortilis Carrière

= Yucca rupicola =

Twistleaf yucca

Species of flowering plant

Yucca rupicola is a plant in the family Asparagaceae, known as the twistleaf yucca, twisted-leaf yucca, Texas yucca or twisted-leaf Spanish-dagger. The species was described by George Heinrich Adolf Scheele in 1850. This is a small, acaulescent plant with distinctive twisted leaves. It is native Texas and northeastern Mexico.

== Description ==
Yucca rupicola forms colonies of rosettes, lacking trunks above-ground but producing a branched caudex under the surface. Leaves are narrowly lanceolate, slightly succulent, twisted, up to 60 cm long but about 40 mm wide at its widest point. Flowers are pendant (drooping), bell-shaped, white or greenish, and bloom from April through June. The blooming stalk can measure up to 1.8 m tall (6 feet). Fruit is a dry capsule up to 6 cm long that is dull black in appearance.

== Distribution and habitat ==
Yucca rupicola is native to the Edwards Plateau region of Texas and Coahuila and Nuevo Leon in Mexico.

Yucca rupicola grows in rocky, open areas, including limestone ledges, grassy plains, and open woodlands. It grows well in dry, caliche soil in sun or partial shade.

== Ecology ==
Yucca rupicola is a larval host for Megathymus yuccae, which feed on the tips of leaves when young and bore down to the root to pupate. The blossoms are also a source of nectar for moths.
