= Howard Scott Gentry =

American botanist (1903–1993)

- Born: December 10, 1903; Temecula, California, USA
- Died: April 1, 1993 (aged 89)
- Education: University of California, Berkeley, University of Michigan (Ph.D.)
- Known for: The world's leading authority on the agaves
- Awards: Guggenheim Fellowship
- Scientific career
- Fields: Botany (especially agaves)
- Workplaces: United States Department of Agriculture, Desert Botanical Garden (Phoenix, Arizona)
- Thesis: The Durango Grasslands
- Author abbrev. (botany): Gentry

Howard Scott Gentry (December 10, 1903 – April 1, 1993) was an American botanist recognized as the world's leading authority on the agaves.

Gentry was born in Temecula, California. In 1931 he received an A.B. (bachelor's) degree in vertebrate zoology from the University of California at Berkeley. In 1947, Gentry received a Ph.D. in botany from the University of Michigan, Dissertation: The Durango Grasslands.

Gentry made his first field trip to the Sierra Madre Occidental of Mexico in 1933. He spent most of the next twenty years exploring and recording the plant life of northwestern Mexico. He worked for the United States Department of Agriculture from 1950 to 1971. He made botanical field trips to Europe, India and Africa looking for plants that are useful to man. He was a research botanist with the Desert Botanical Garden in Phoenix, Arizona after 1971. He also collected many of the specimens now at the Huntington Botanical Gardens in San Marino, California.

His 1942 study of the plants of the Río Mayo region of northwestern Mexico became a classic for the extent of its coverage of a previously little-known area.

In addition to purely botanical work, he was interested in ethnobotany, and his plant descriptions include information about their uses by indigenous peoples.

== Works ==
- Río Mayo Plants of Sonora-Chihuahua (1942), later updated posthumously as Gentry's Rio Mayo Plants (University of Arizona Press, 1998) ISBN 0-8165-1726-6
- The Agave Family of Sonora (USDA, 1972)
- The Agaves of Baja California (California Academy of Sciences, 1978)
- Agaves of Continental North America (University of Arizona Press, 1982) ISBN 0-8165-2395-9
