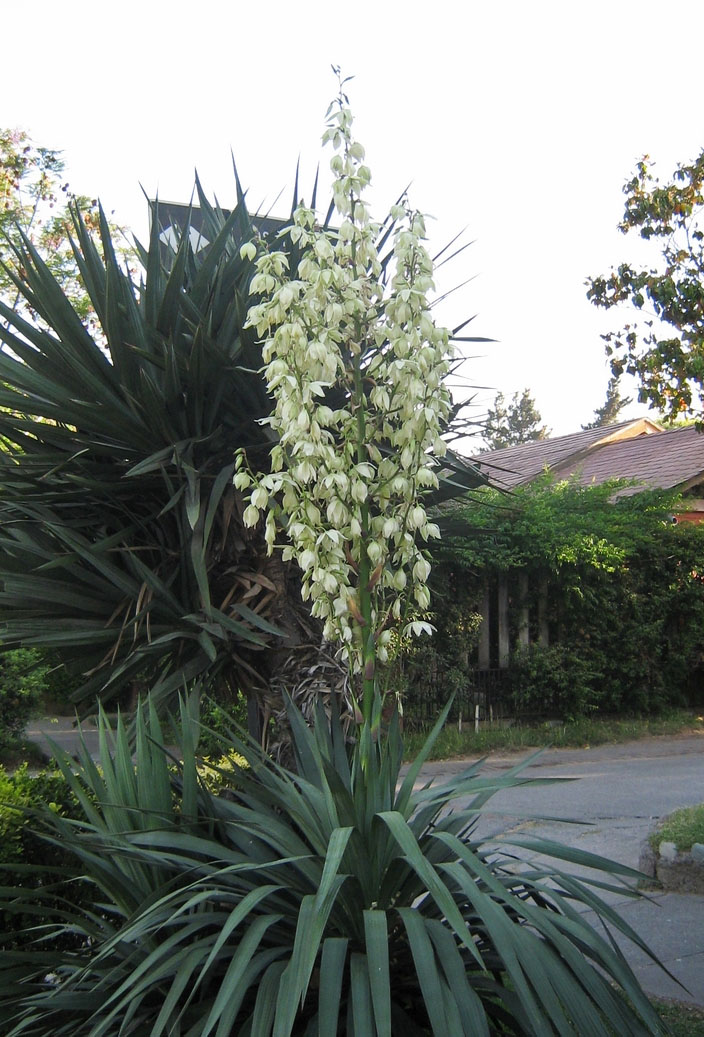

Conservation status
- Least Concern (IUCN 3.1)

- Apparently Secure (NatureServe)

Scientific classification
- Kingdom: Plantae
- Clade: Tracheophytes
- Clade: Angiosperms
- Clade: Monocots
- Order: Asparagales
- Family: Asparagaceae
- Subfamily: Agavoideae
- Genus: Yucca
- Species: Y. gloriosa

Binomial name
- Yucca gloriosa L.

Varieties
- Y. g. var. gloriosa; Y. g. var. tristis
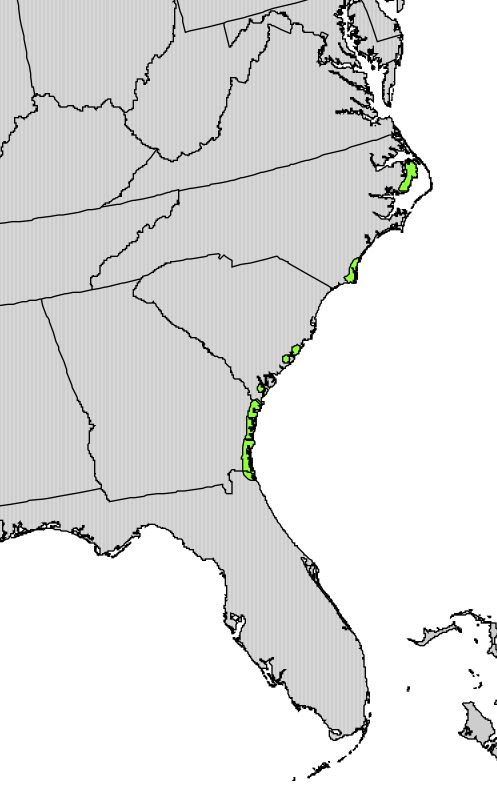
- Natural range

Synonyms
- List: Dracaena ensifolia; Yucca acuminata; Yucca acutifolia; Yucca angustifolia; Yucca boerhaavii; Yucca ellacombei; Yucca ensifolia; Yucca eylesii; Yucca falcata; Yucca flexilis; Yucca grandis; Yucca integerrima; Yucca japonica; Yucca longifolia; Yucca obliqua; Yucca patens; Yucca peacockii; Yucca pendula; Yucca plicata; Yucca plicatilis; Yucca pruinosa; Yucca recurva; Yucca recurvifolia; Yucca rufocincta; Yucca semicylindrica; Yucca stenophylla; Yucca superba; Yucca tortulata

= Yucca gloriosa =

Plant species in the asparagus family

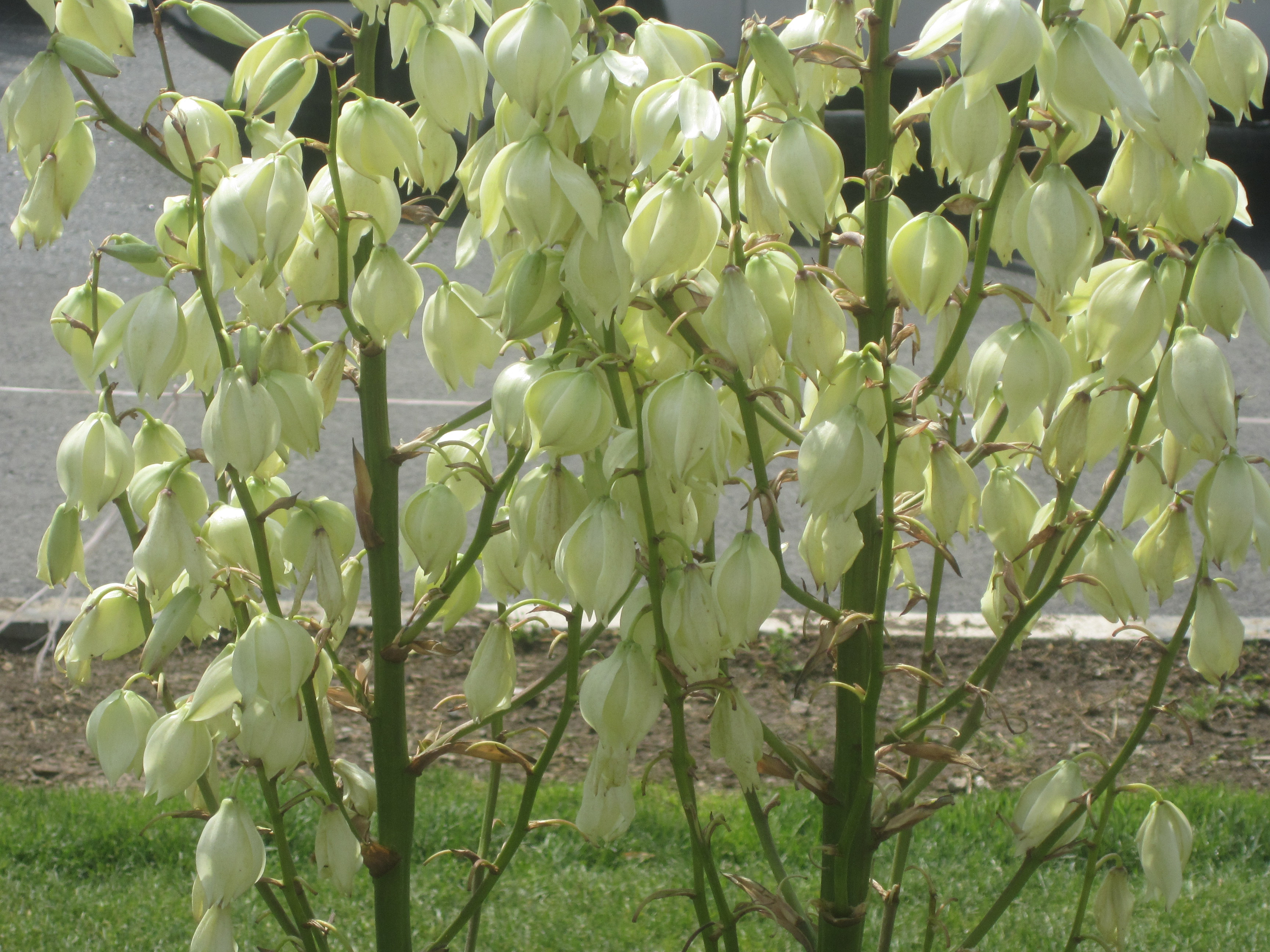
Inflorescence

Yucca gloriosa 'variegata' in Jardin Exotique de Roscoff

Yucca gloriosa, also known as Spanish dagger, mound lily yucca and other common names, is a species of flowering plant in the asparagus family, native to the southeastern United States. Growing to 2.5 m (8 ft), it is an evergreen shrub. It is widely cultivated as an ornamental for its architectural qualities, and has reportedly become established in warmer climates in the wild in various parts of the world.

== Names ==
In addition to Spanish dagger and mound lily yucca, Yucca gloriosa is also commonly known as Roman candle, palm lily, and Spanish needle. However all of these names are ambiguous, with Roman candle also referring to Senna alata or a trade name for a Podocarpus macrophyllus cultivar, palm lily almost always referring to Cordyline fruticosa or other Cordylines, and Spanish needle also referring to Bidens alba. In the horticultural trade, Yucca gloriosa var. tristis varieties, with their less rigid leaves, are often referred to as Y. pendula or Y. recurvifolia, and commonly called soft-leaf (or soft-tipped) yucca, weeping yucca, curve-leaf yucca or curved-leaved Spanish-dagger.

== Description ==
Yucca gloriosa is caulescent, usually with several stems arising from the base, the base thickening in adult specimens. The long narrow leaves are straight and very stiff, growing to 30–50 cm (12–20 in) long and 2–3.5 cm (3/4–1 1/2 in) wide. They are dark green with entire margins, smooth, rarely finely denticulate, acuminate, with a sharp brown terminal spine. The inflorescence is a panicle up to 2.5 m (8 ft) long, of bell-shaped white flowers, sometimes tinged purple or red. The fruit is a leathery, elongate berry up to 8 cm (3 in) long.

== Habitat ==
Yucca gloriosa grows on exposed sand dunes along the coast and barrier islands of the lower East Coast of the United States, often together with Yucca aloifolia and a variety formerly called Yucca recurvifolia or Y. gloriosa var. recurvifolia, now Y. gloriosa var. tristis. Large, endemic populations can be found in the beach and dune environments of coastal North Carolina. In contrast to Y. gloriosa var. tristis, the leaves of Y. gloriosa var. gloriosa are hard stiff, erect and narrower. On the other hand, Y. aloifolia has leaves with denticulate margins and a sharp-pointed, terminal spine.

== Distribution ==
Yucca gloriosa is native to the coast and barrier islands of southeastern North America, growing on sand dunes. It ranges from extreme southeastern Virginia south to northern Florida in the United States. It is associated with Yucca filamentosa, Yucca aloifolia, and Opuntia species.

== Cultivation ==
The plant is widely cultivated in warm temperate and subtropical climates, and valued as an architectural focal point. It has reportedly escaped from cultivation and naturalised in Italy, Turkey, Mauritius, Réunion, Guam, the Northern Mariana Islands, Puerto Rico, Argentina, Chile and Uruguay. In landscape use, little maintenance is needed other than the removal of dead leaves when the shrub nears its ultimate height. The plant is very hardy, without leaf damage at −20 °C (−4 °F), and can handle brief snow and freezing temperatures, as well as long periods of drought. Yucca gloriosa, and the cultivars 'Variegata' and Bright Star = 'Walbristar' have gained the Royal Horticultural Society's Award of Garden Merit.

== Properties ==
Yucca gloriosa has been known to cause skin irritation and even allergic reactions upon contact. The leaf points are even sharp enough to break the skin.

== Taxonomy ==
Yucca gloriosa was first described by Carl Linnaeus in 1753. Genetic evidence has shown that the species originated via multiple hybridizations between Yucca aloifolia and Yucca filamentosa. It is classified as part of the Yucca genus within the Asparagaceae family.

The species has two accepted varieties:

- Yucca gloriosa var. gloriosa
- Yucca gloriosa var. tristis Carrière

Yucca gloriosa has 85 synonyms of the species or one of its two varieties including 28 species.

Table of Synonyms
Name	Year	Rank	Synonym of:	Notes
Dracaena ensifolia Haw.	1812	species	var. tristis	= het., nom. illeg.
Yucca acuminata Sweet	1827	species	var. gloriosa	= het.
Yucca acutifolia Truff.	1869	species	var. gloriosa	= het.
Yucca angustifolia Carrière	1859	species	var. tristis	= het., nom. illeg.
Yucca boerhaavii Baker	1870	species	var. tristis	= het.
Yucca ellacombei Baker	1872	species	var. gloriosa	= het.
Yucca ensifolia Groenland	1858	species	var. gloriosa	= het.
Yucca eylesii Baker	1880	species	var. tristis	= het.
Yucca falcata Anon.	1876	species	var. tristis	= het.
Yucca falcata var. semicylindrica (Baker) Baker	1880	variety	var. tristis	= het.
Yucca flexilis Carrière	1859	species	var. tristis	= het.
Yucca flexilis f. boerhaavii (Baker) Trel.	1902	form	var. tristis	= het.
Yucca flexilis f. ensifolia (Groenland) Voss	1895	form	var. gloriosa	= het.
Yucca flexilis var. ensifolia (Groenland) Baker	1880	variety	var. gloriosa	= het.
Yucca flexilis var. falcata (Anon.) Baker	1880	variety	var. tristis	= het.
Yucca flexilis f. hildrethii Trel.	1902	form	var. tristis	= het.
Yucca flexilis f. patens (André) Trel.	1902	form	var. gloriosa	= het.
Yucca flexilis f. peacockii (Baker) Trel.	1902	form	var. tristis	= het.
Yucca flexilis f. semicylindrica Trel.	1902	form	var. tristis	= het.
Yucca flexilis f. tortulata (Baker) Trel.	1902	form	var. gloriosa	= het.
Yucca gloriosa f. acuminata (Sweet) Voss	1895	form	var. gloriosa	= het.
Yucca gloriosa var. acuminata (Sweet) Carrière	1868	variety	var. gloriosa	= het.
Yucca gloriosa var. elegans Carrière	1880	variety	var. tristis	= het.
Yucca gloriosa var. ellacombei (Baker) Baker	1880	variety	var. gloriosa	= het.
Yucca gloriosa var. flexilis (Carrière) Trel.	1902	variety	var. tristis	= het.
Yucca gloriosa f. genuina Engelm.	1873	form	Y. gloriosa	≡ hom., not validly publ.
Yucca gloriosa var. glaucescens Carrière	1860	variety	var. gloriosa	= het.
Yucca gloriosa var. longifolia Carrière	1862	variety	var. gloriosa	= het.
Yucca gloriosa f. longifolia (Carrière) Trel.	1902	form	var. gloriosa	= het.
Yucca gloriosa var. maculata Carrière	1859	variety	var. gloriosa	= het.
Yucca gloriosa f. maculata (Carrière) Trel.	1902	form	var. gloriosa	= het.
Yucca gloriosa var. marginata Carrière	1880	variety	var. tristis	= het.
Yucca gloriosa var. marginata-aurea Carrière	1880	variety	var. tristis	= het.
Yucca gloriosa var. mediopicta Carrière	1880	variety	var. gloriosa	= het.
Yucca gloriosa var. mediostriata Planch.	1880	variety	var. gloriosa	= het.
Yucca gloriosa f. mediostriata (Planch.) Trel.	1902	form	var. gloriosa	= het.
Yucca gloriosa var. minor Carrière	1860	variety	var. gloriosa	= het.
Yucca gloriosa f. minor (Carrière) Trel.	1902	form	var. gloriosa	= het.
Yucca gloriosa var. mollis Carrière	1860	variety	var. tristis	= het.
Yucca gloriosa var. nobilis Carrière	1860	variety	var. gloriosa	= het.
Yucca gloriosa f. nobilis (Carrière) Trel.	1902	form	var. gloriosa	= het.
Yucca gloriosa var. obliqua (Haw.) Baker	1870	variety	var. gloriosa	= het.
Yucca gloriosa f. obliqua (Haw.) Voss	1895	form	var. gloriosa	= het.
Yucca gloriosa subvar. parviflora Carrière	1860	subvariety	var. gloriosa	= het.
Yucca gloriosa f. pendula (Groenland) Schelle	1903	form	var. tristis	= het.
Yucca gloriosa var. planifolia Engelm.	1873	variety	var. tristis	= het.
Yucca gloriosa var. plicata Carrière	1860	variety	var. gloriosa	= het.
Yucca gloriosa var. pruinosa (Baker) Baker	1880	variety	var. gloriosa	= het.
Yucca gloriosa f. pruinosa (Baker) Voss	1895	form	var. gloriosa	= het.
Yucca gloriosa var. recurvata Baker	1870	variety	var. gloriosa	= het.
Yucca gloriosa var. recurvifolia (Salisb.) Engelm.	1873	variety	var. tristis	= het.
Yucca gloriosa var. robusta Carrière	1860	variety	var. gloriosa	= het.
Yucca gloriosa var. rufocincta (Haw.) Baker	1880	variety	var. tristis	= het.
Yucca gloriosa f. rufocincta (Haw.) Voss	1895	form	var. tristis	= het.
Yucca gloriosa var. superba Baker	1870	var. gloriosa	variety	= het.
Yucca gloriosa f. superba (Baker) Trel.	1902	form	var. gloriosa	= het.
Yucca gloriosa var. tortulata (Baker) Baker	1880	variety	var. gloriosa	= het.
Yucca gloriosa f. tortulata (Baker) Voss	1895	form	var. gloriosa	= het.
Yucca gloriosa var. variegata (Carrière) Carrière	1880	variety	var. tristis	= het.
Yucca grandis Sprenger	1904	species	var. tristis	= het.
Yucca integerrima Stokes	1812	species	var. gloriosa	= het.
Yucca japonica Carrière	1859	species	var. tristis	= het.
Yucca longifolia Carrière	1859	species	var. tristis	= het., nom. illeg.
Yucca obliqua Haw.	1812	species	var. gloriosa	= het.
Yucca patens André	1870	species	var. gloriosa	= het.
Yucca peacockii Baker	1880	species	var. tristis	= het.
Yucca pendula Groenland	1858	species	var. tristis	= het.
Yucca pendula var. aurea Carrière	1877	variety	var. tristis	= het.
Yucca pendula var. variegata Carrière	1875	variety	var. tristis	= het.
Yucca plicata (Carrière) K.Koch	1873	species	var. gloriosa	= het.
Yucca plicatilis K.Koch	1873	species	var. gloriosa	= het.
Yucca pruinosa Baker	1870	species	var. gloriosa	= het.
Yucca recurva Haw.	1812	species	var. tristis	= het.
Yucca recurvifolia Salisb.	1806	species	var. tristis	= het.
Yucca recurvifolia f. elegans (Carrière) Trel.	1902	form	var. tristis	= het.
Yucca recurvifolia f. marginata (Carrière) Trel.	1902	form	var. tristis	= het.
Yucca recurvifolia var. rufocincta (Haw.) Baker	1870	variety	var. tristis	= het.
Yucca recurvifolia f. rufocincta (Haw.) Trel.	1902	form	var. tristis	= het.
Yucca recurvifolia f. tristis (Carrière) Trel.	1902	form	var. tristis	≡ hom.
Yucca recurvifolia f. variegata (Carrière) Trel.	1902	form	var. tristis	= het.
Yucca rufocincta Haw.	1819	species	var. tristis	= het.
Yucca semicylindrica Baker	1870	species	var. tristis	= het.
Yucca stenophylla Carrière	1859	species	var. tristis	= het.
Yucca superba Haw.	1819	species	var. gloriosa	= het., nom. illeg.
Yucca tortulata Baker	1870	species	var. gloriosa	= het.
Notes: ≡ homotypic synonym; = heterotypic synonym
