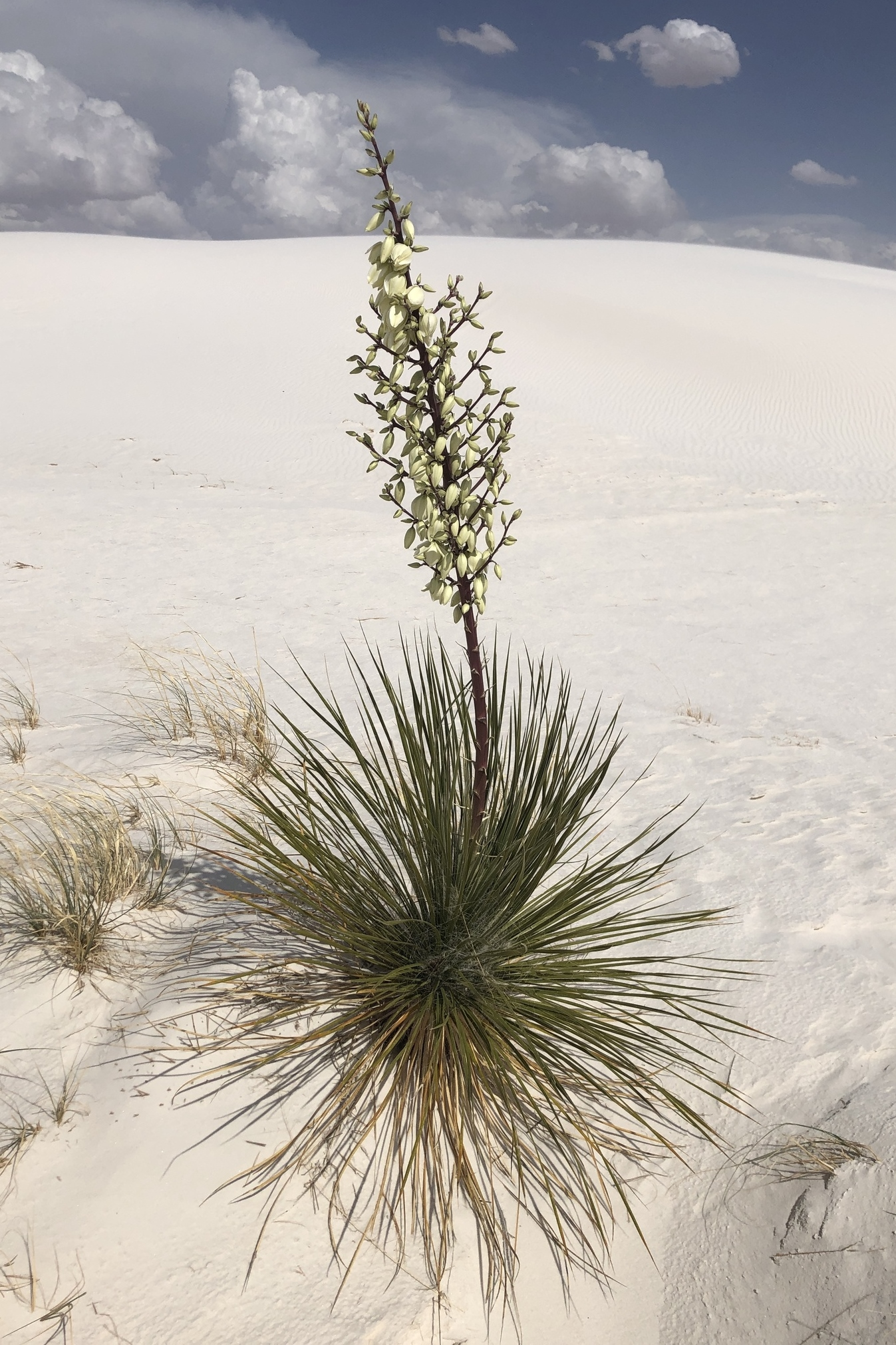
- Yucca elata in White Sands National Park, New Mexico

Scientific classification
- Kingdom: Plantae
- Clade: Tracheophytes
- Clade: Angiosperms
- Clade: Monocots
- Order: Asparagales
- Family: Asparagaceae
- Subfamily: Agavoideae
- Genus: Yucca; L.

Species
- See List of Yucca species
- Yucca in North America

Synonyms
- List: Clistoyucca (Engelm.) Trel.; Codonocrinum Willd. ex Schult. & Schult.f.; Samuela Trel.; Sarcoyucca (Trel.) Linding.; Matuda-pina Hochstätter

= Yucca =

Plant genus in the agave subfamily

Yucca (/ˈjʌkə/ YUK-ə) is both the scientific name and common name for a genus native to North America from Panama to southern Canada. It contains 50 accepted species. In addition to yucca, they are also known as Adam's needle or Spanish-bayonet. The genus is generally classified in the asparagus family in a subfamily with the Agave, though historically it was part of the lily family. The species range from small shrubby plants to tree-like giants, such as the Joshua tree. All yuccas have rosettes of leaves that taper to points and inflorescences with many flowers that are mainly cream white with thick petals. Though adapted to a wide range of climates the plants are xerophytes, ones that specialize in dry living conditions.

The tight relationship between the yucca plants and their pollinators, the yucca moths from the genera Tegeticula and Parategeticula, is a well known example of evolutionary mutualism. They are an important part of the ecology of North American deserts, providing shelter to small animals and creating habitats. The human uses of yuccas include garden plants, as food, and for extracts. The flower petals of various species are eaten as a part of local cuisine, particularly in Central America and Mexico. Historically, the yucca was extensively used for its fibers to make cords, baskets, mats, and sandals. It continues to be used by native peoples for traditional soaps.

== Description ==
Yuccas are perennial plants with long, pointed sword shaped leaves in one or more rosettes, circular arrangements of leaves. Usually the leaves are stiff and fibrous, but a few species have fleshy leaves. The leaves are numerous and arranged in spirals at the ends of stems or branches. Plants can be small shrubs or large resembling trees. The surface of the leaves are hairless, but some have a very rough surface. About half of all species have fibers that peel off the edges of the leaves. Their color can be bright green, gray-green, or pale blue. The leaves never have spines on their edges, but may be very finely toothed. Some yucca species reproduce by underground rhizomes and form colonies of plants, but this feature is rare in the fleshy-fruited yuccas, which will usually produce new sprouts at the base of the plant from nodule-like growths.

Plants without stems or trunks grow from a thick underground caudex, a modified stem with growth at the end like in a palm tree. Species that do not have trunks tend to be found in colder areas such as the Rocky Mountains, Great Plains, and eastern United States. Species with trunks are more common in the subtropics, deserts, and tropics to the south. The largest of these tree yuccas is Yucca brevifolia, commonly known as the Joshua tree in the American southwest. The Joshua tree can reach up to 15 meters (49 ft) in height. Every species grows in soil, however Yucca lacandonica usually grows as an epiphyte.

Some species have a scape, a long flowering stem without any leaves or bracts along its length. These are always less than 2.5 centimeters (1 in) in diameter. The inflorescence is usually upright, but in a few species bends over and hangs downward. The inflorescence can be a panicle, where the flowers are on branches off the main stem, or a raceme, where the flowers are attached directly by flower stalks to the main stem. Though the plants live for many years and flower multiple times, each inflorescence dies after setting seed.

The flowers are large and showy, ranging from bell shaped to round like a globe. The six tepals are white to cream or slightly green in color. They are thick and leathery in texture, and in many species the three outermost tepals will have red, pink, maroon, purple, or brown streaks.

In about half of the species the fruit is a dry capsule. In the other half, it is a fleshy fruit. Inside the fruit, the seeds are tightly packed, flat, and black in color. Dry capsules are held in an upright position while soft capsules hang downwards.

Due to similar characteristics of many species it is difficult to identify them without flowers or fruits. Many characteristics taken together are needed to make identifications, often including the size and color of the pistil, style, and flowers while alive. Yuccas are distinct from Agave due to typically having less succulent leaves, thicker flower petals, and a lack of spines on leaf edges.

Gallery of forms

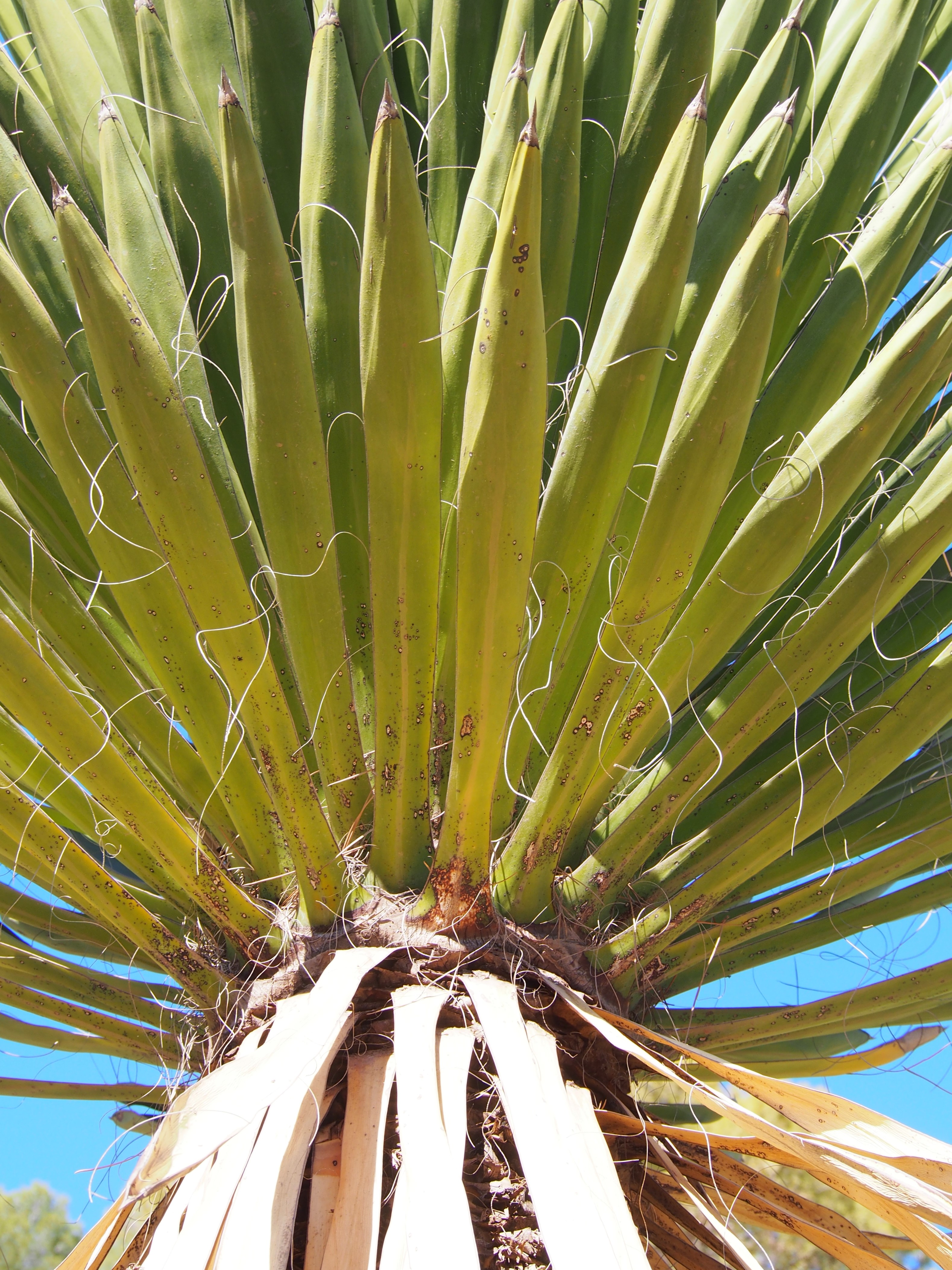
Underside of leaves, giant Spanish dagger (Yucca carnerosana)

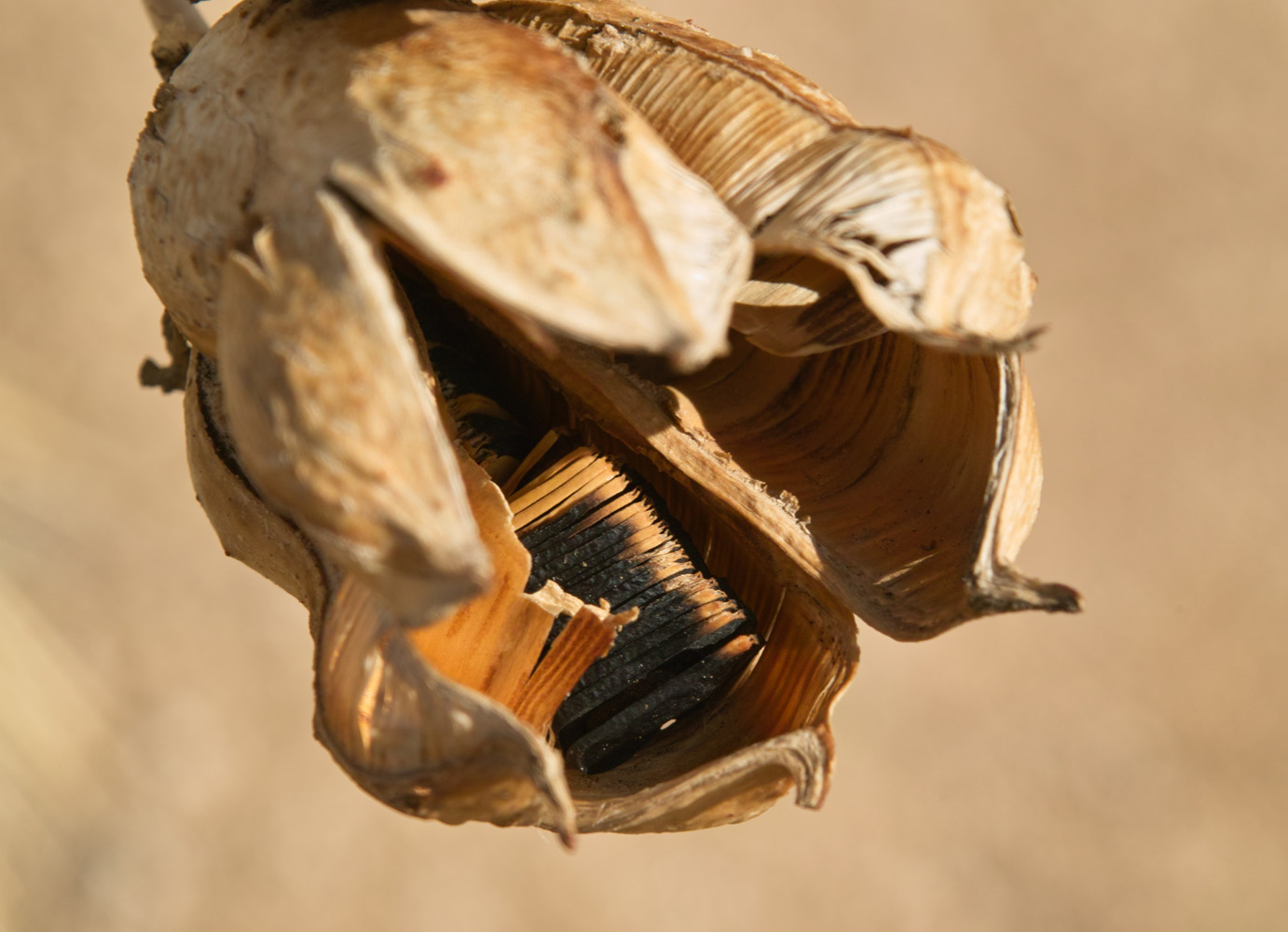
The dry capsule of soaptree yucca (Yucca elata), open with the flat black seeds inside

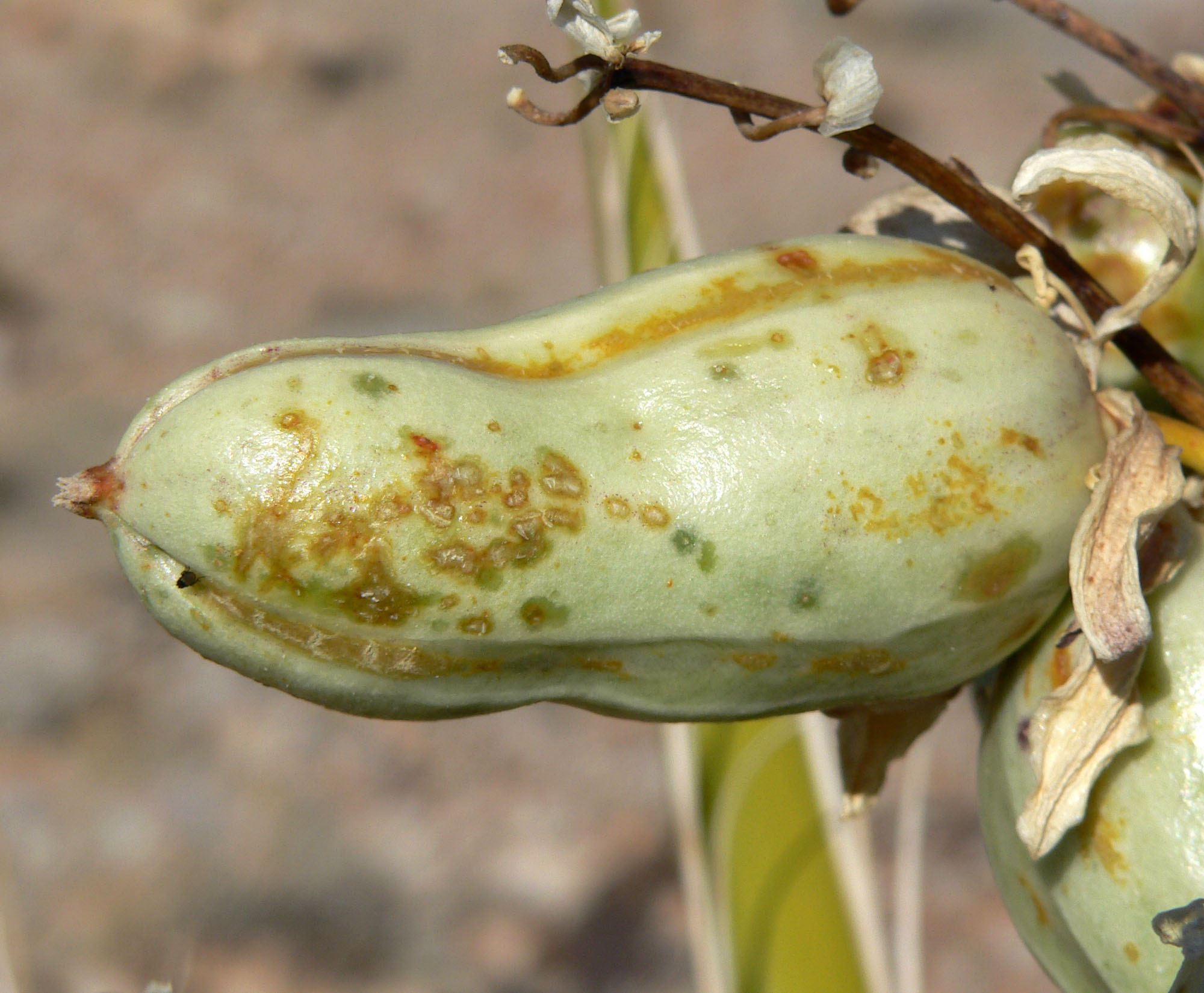
Yucca schidigera fruit, Blue Diamond Hill Red Rock Canyon National Conservation Area, southern Nevada

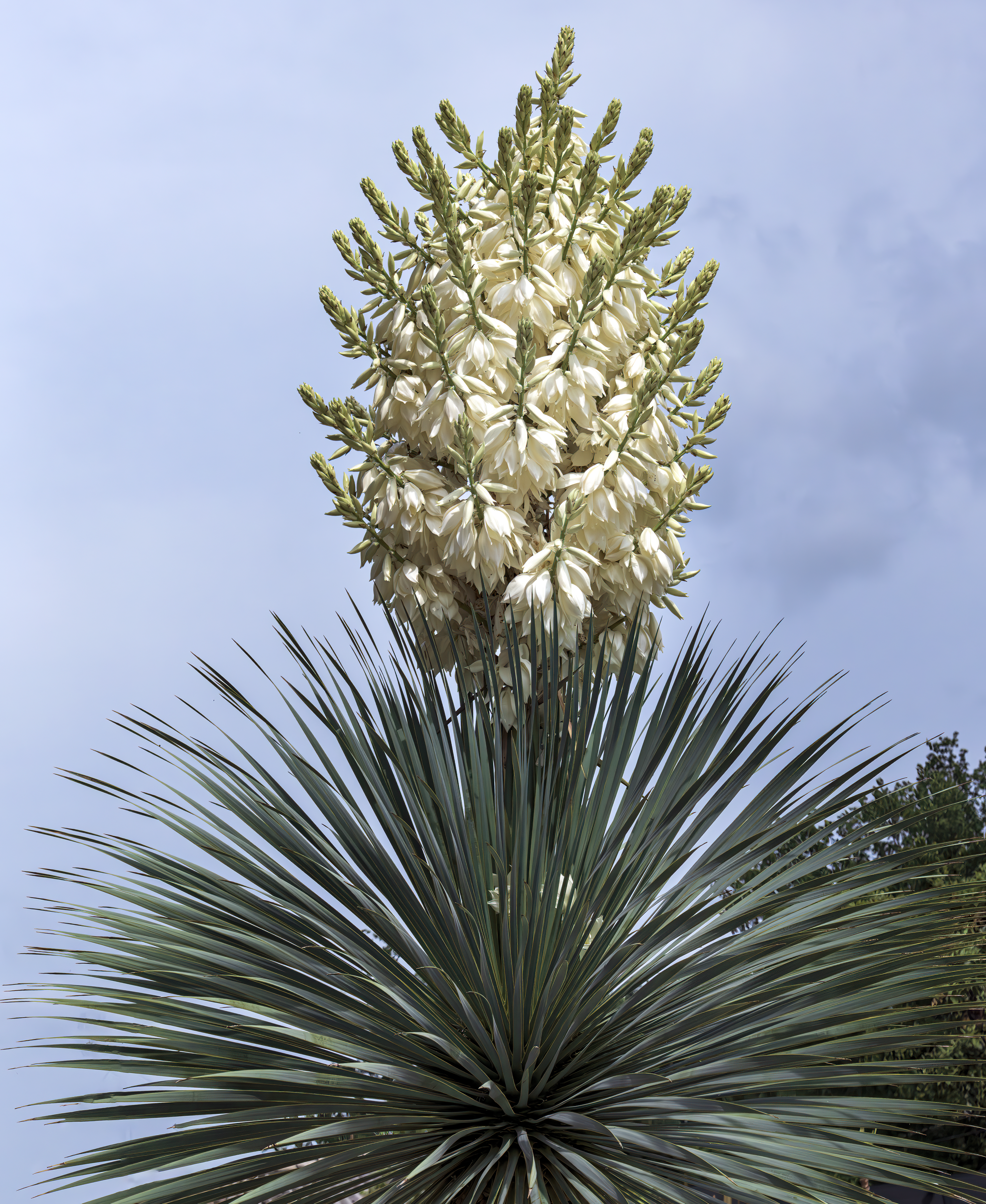
Branched inflorescence on beaked yucca

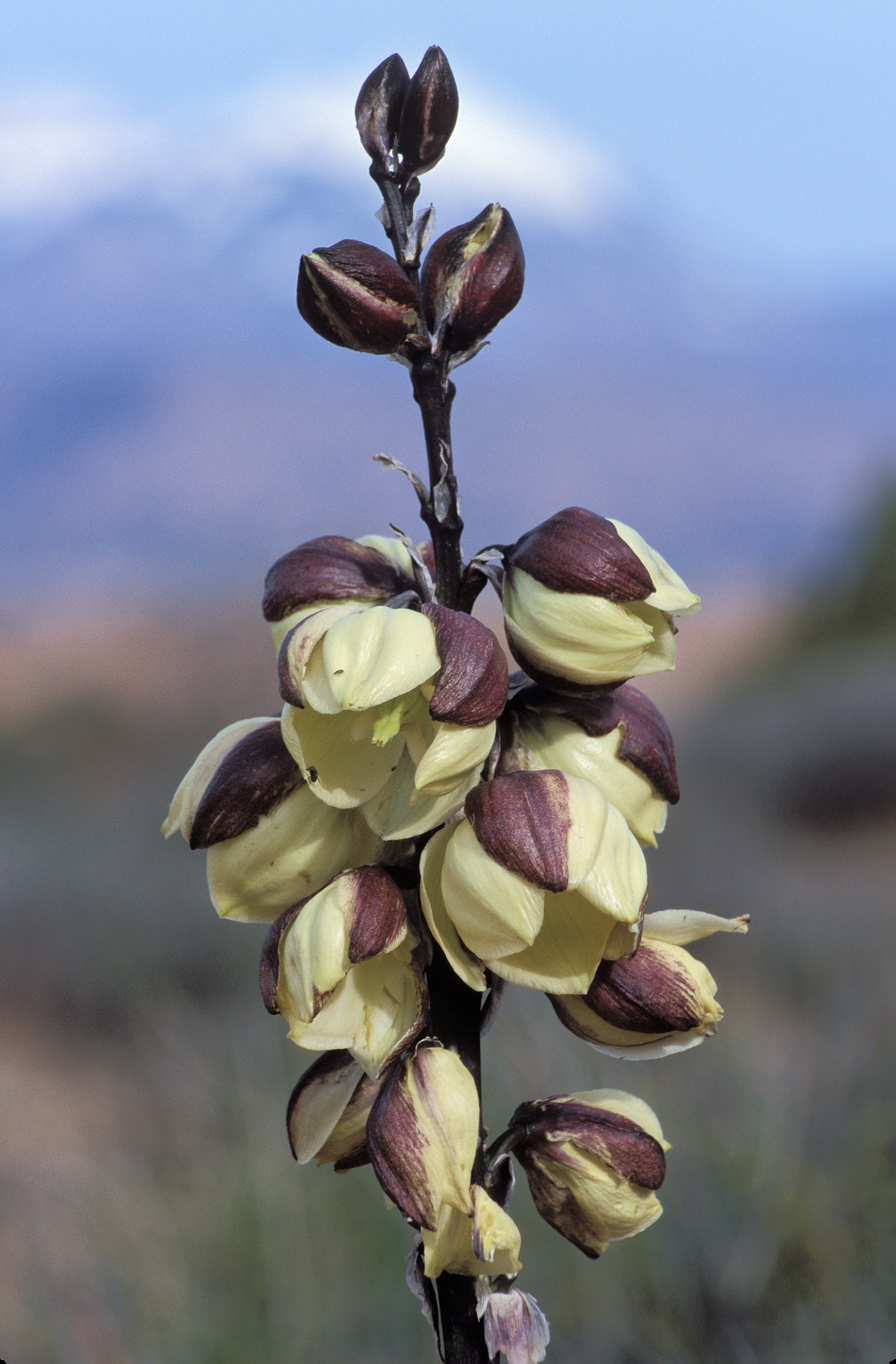
Simple inflorescence on Narrowleaf yucca

== Taxonomy ==
Yucca was first described and named by Carl Linnaeus in his book Species Plantarum, published in 1753. The first work on the genus as a whole was published by George Engelmann in 1873. A lectotype for the genus, a specimen of Yucca aloifolia, was designated by Nathaniel Lord Britton and John Adolph Shafer in 1908.

In 1902 William Trelease published a paper separating out Clistoyucca and Samuela from Yucca, along with his 1893 separation of Hesperoyucca from the genus. Susan Delano McKelvey argued against this separation, though she recognized them as sections of Yucca. McKelvey did allow that Hesperoyucca might be recognized as a genus writing, "since a number of flower and fruit characters differ from those in all other sections". DNA investigations in the 1990s found support for Hesperoyucca. As of 2025, Hesperoyucca is listed as accepted.

Prior to the 1950s Yucca was placed in Liliaceae, the lily family, due to having a superior ovary. Since that time, evidence of it being more closely related to the Agave genus has been accepted. In particular, the discovery that Yucca, like plants in Agave, has 5 large and 20 small chromosomes was a large factor in reconsidering their relationship. The APG III system, published in 2009, placed the genus into the family Asparagaceae in the Agavoideae subfamily. This classification continued in APG IV. However, some botanists prefer to classify this subfamily as a family named Agavaceae.

=== Species ===
As of 2025 Plants of the World Online (POWO) and World Flora Online (WFO) both list 50 valid species. In addition, POWO lists three other species, Yucca jaegeriana (McKelvey) L.W.Lenz, Yucca muscipula Ayala-Hern., Ríos-Gómez, E.Solano & García-Mend., and Yucca pinicola Zamudio, that WFO lists as unchecked or as a synonym of another species. There are also two natural hybrids, Yucca × schottii, which was formerly listed as a species under various names, and Yucca × quinnarjenii.

Gallery of species

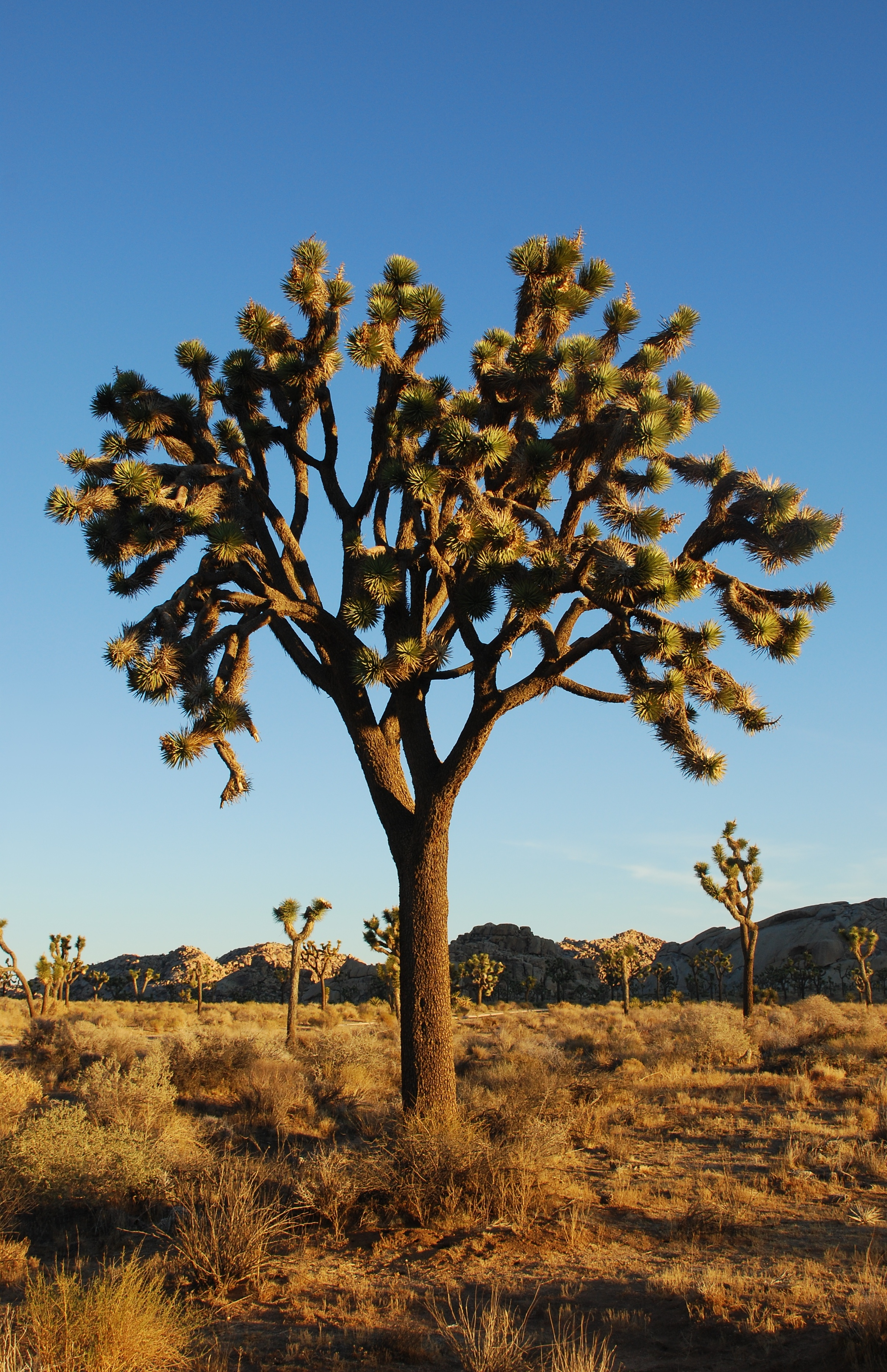
Joshua tree (Yucca brevifolia), Joshua Tree National Park

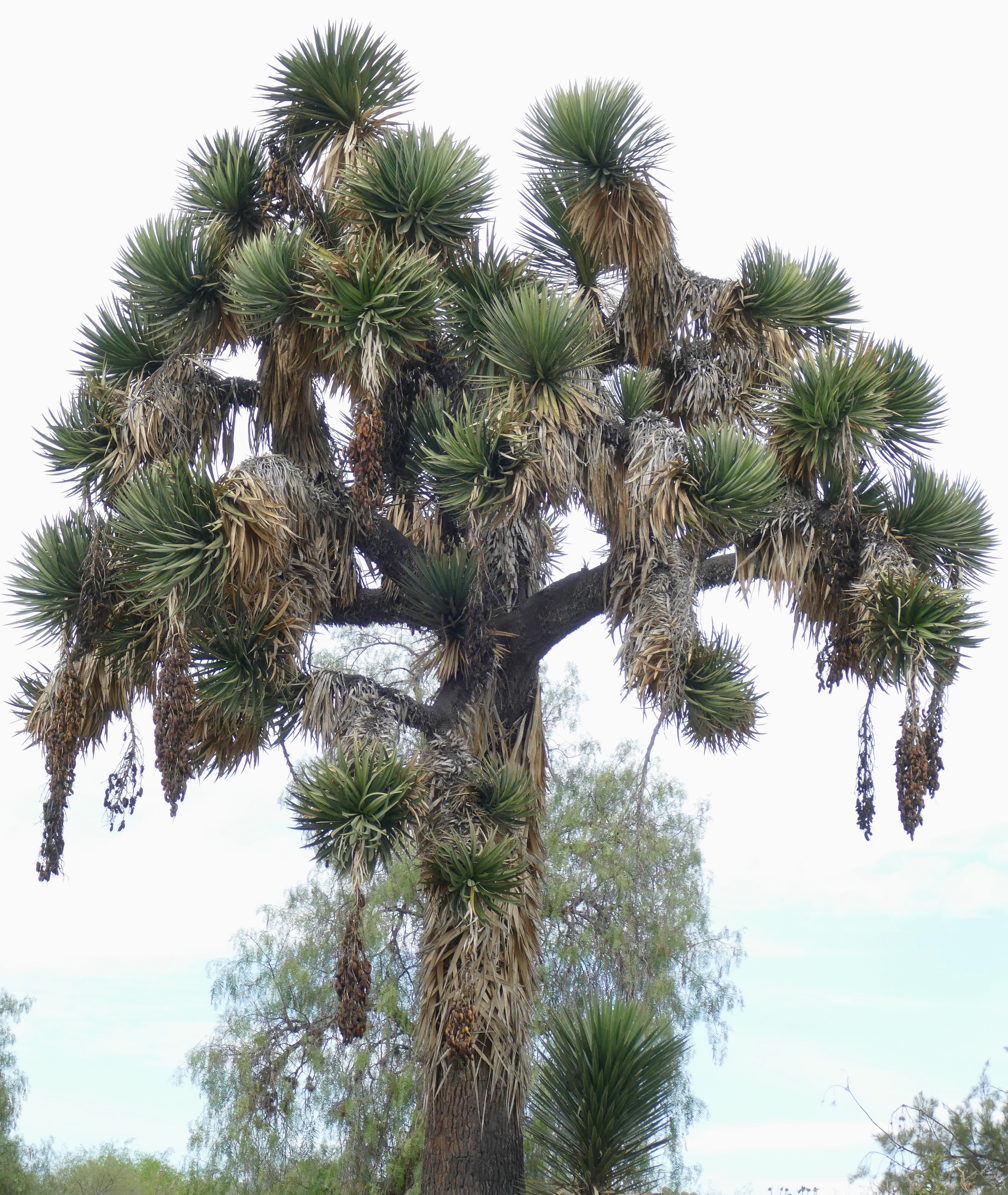
Tree yucca (Yucca filifera), Tula National Park

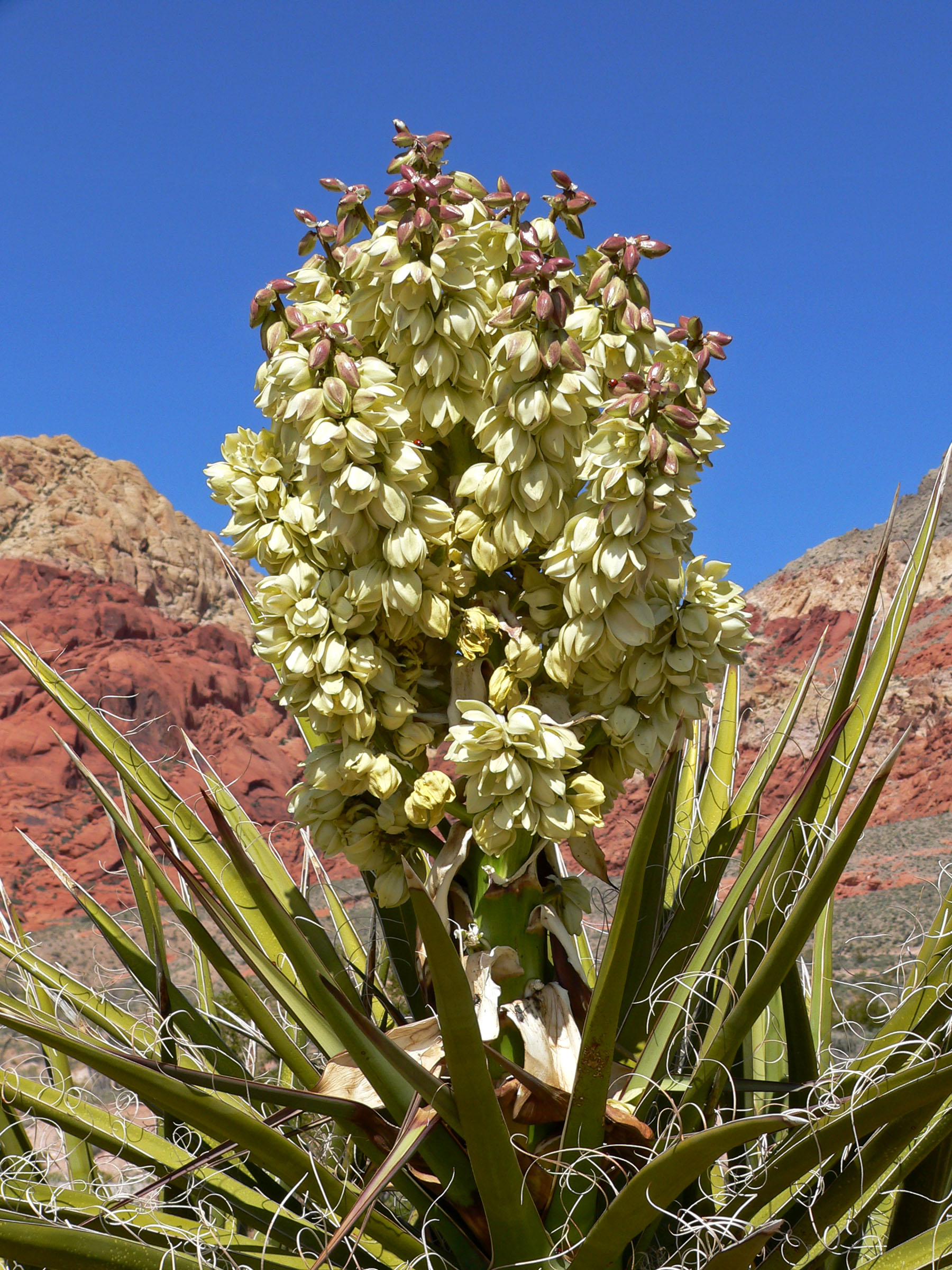
Mojave yucca (Yucca schidigera) Spring Mountains, southern Nevada

=== Names ===
In 1737 Linnaeus, in setting out his rules for the names of genera, wrote, "Generic names which have not a root derived from Greek or Latin are to be rejected". However, in the case of Yucca and several other names, he violated his own rule by adopting names derived from other languages. The word was borrowed from the Carib language by Spanish as juca, starting with Amerigo Vespucci in 1497 referring to cassava. It was first used to refer to the unrelated plants of the genus Yucca in a German travel account published in 1557. This was used as the genus name by Linnaeus in Species Plantarum.

The name yucca is used as an English common name for plant species in the genus. It is pronounced /ˌˈjəkəˌ/ (YUCK-uh) in both British English and American English, but may also be pronounced /ˌˈjuːkəˌ/ (YOO-kuh) in British English. It is also known as Adam's needle or as Spanish-bayonet. Other common names for some species include Spanish dagger, shin dagger, soapweed, or soaptree. In the plant trade they are sometimes known as palm lilies. The name yucca can be confused with cassava, though the spelling yuca is often used to distinguish the food from plants in Yucca.

The Aztecs living in Mexico call the local yucca species iczotl in Nahuatl, which gave the Spanish izote.

== Range and habitat ==
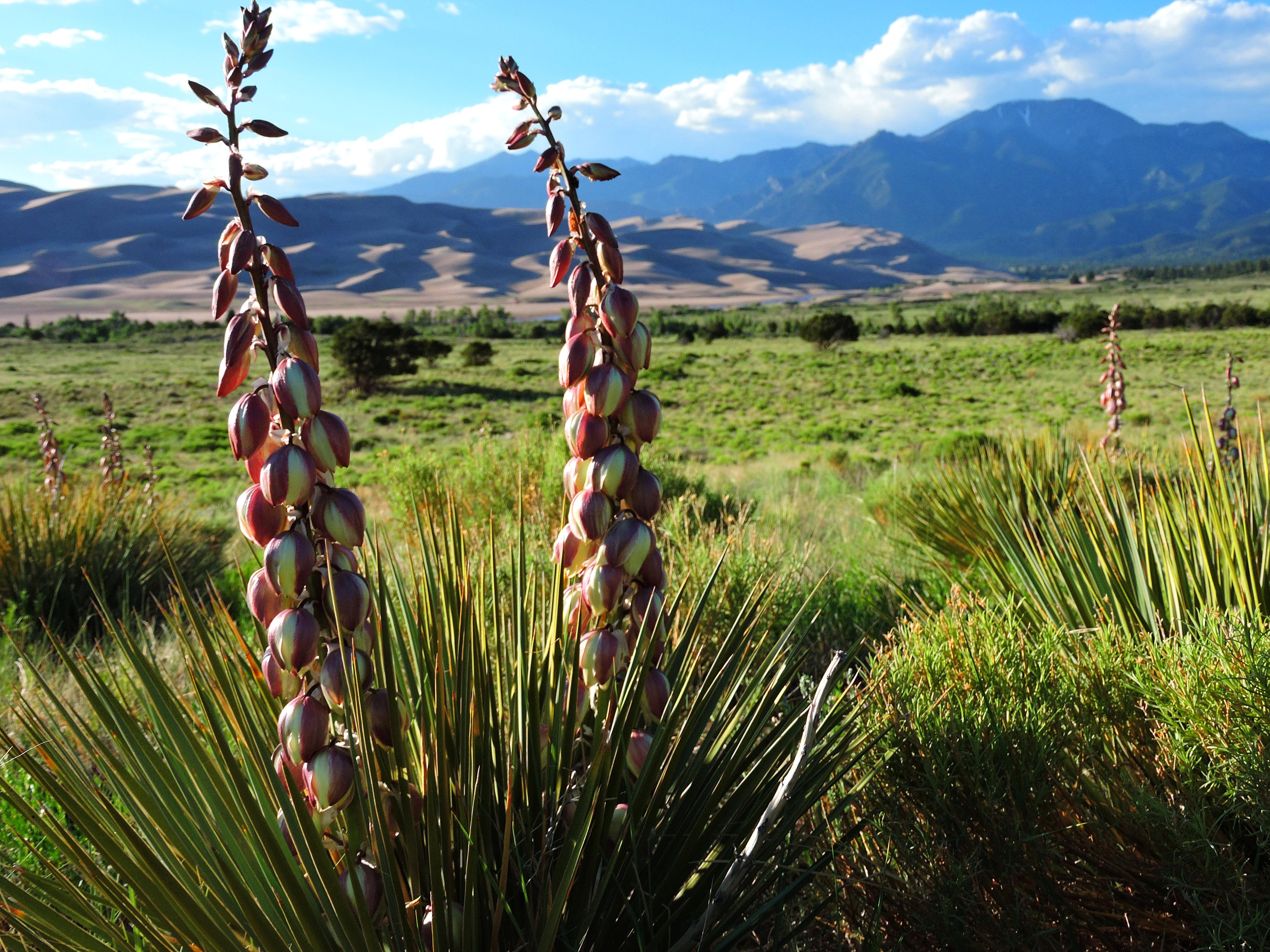
Narrowleaf yucca (Yucca angustissima) blooming in Great Sand Dunes National Park and Preserve

The natural range of the yuccas stretches across much of southern North America from Panama in the south as far north as Alberta in Canada. The exact extent is disputed as though Yucca gigantea is listed by Plants of the World Online (POWO) and World Flora Online (WFO) as native to Central America, other sources like World Plants list it as introduced to all the nations of Central America. Likewise, Yucca flaccida is listed as native to Ontario by POWO, WFO, and World Plants, but is listed by the Database of Vascular Plants of Canada as introduced.

Yuccas are generally accepted to be introduced to the islands Caribbean. Various species have also escaped from cultivation in Europe as far east as Poland and Romania. They grow as an introduced species in Turkey, Pakistan, and Bangladesh in Asia. In Africa they are reported in Tunisia and KwaZulu-Natal and Free State in South Africa. They have been introduced to South America in Ecuador, Bolivia, Uruguay, and Argentina. In Australia Aloe yucca (Yucca aloifolia) has naturalized in Western Australia, Queensland, New South Wales, and the Australian Capital Territory. It is doubtfully naturalized on Lord Howe Island and naturalized on Norfolk Island. Two other species, Yucca gloriosa and Yucca whipplei, may also be naturalized in Australia. Spineless yucca (Yucca gigantea) is considered the most common variety in Australia. They are listed as an environmental weed in New Zealand having been found 31 times outside of cultivation.

The yuccas are xerophytic, plants with adaptations to dry environments, with even those native to rainy habitats growing better when in drier areas. The smaller, freeze-tolerant species of yucca have two centers of diversity, one in Texas and the other on the Colorado Plateau. They are found generally to the north and east of the range in Chihuahuan Desert, the Trans-Pecos region, the Rocky Mountains, the Colorado Plateau, and the Great Plains. Tree-like yuccas with fleshy fruits have a center of diversity in the Sonoran Desert. They are found mainly in Mexico, while the tree like yuccas with spongy fruits are found only in the Mojave Desert.

== Ecology ==
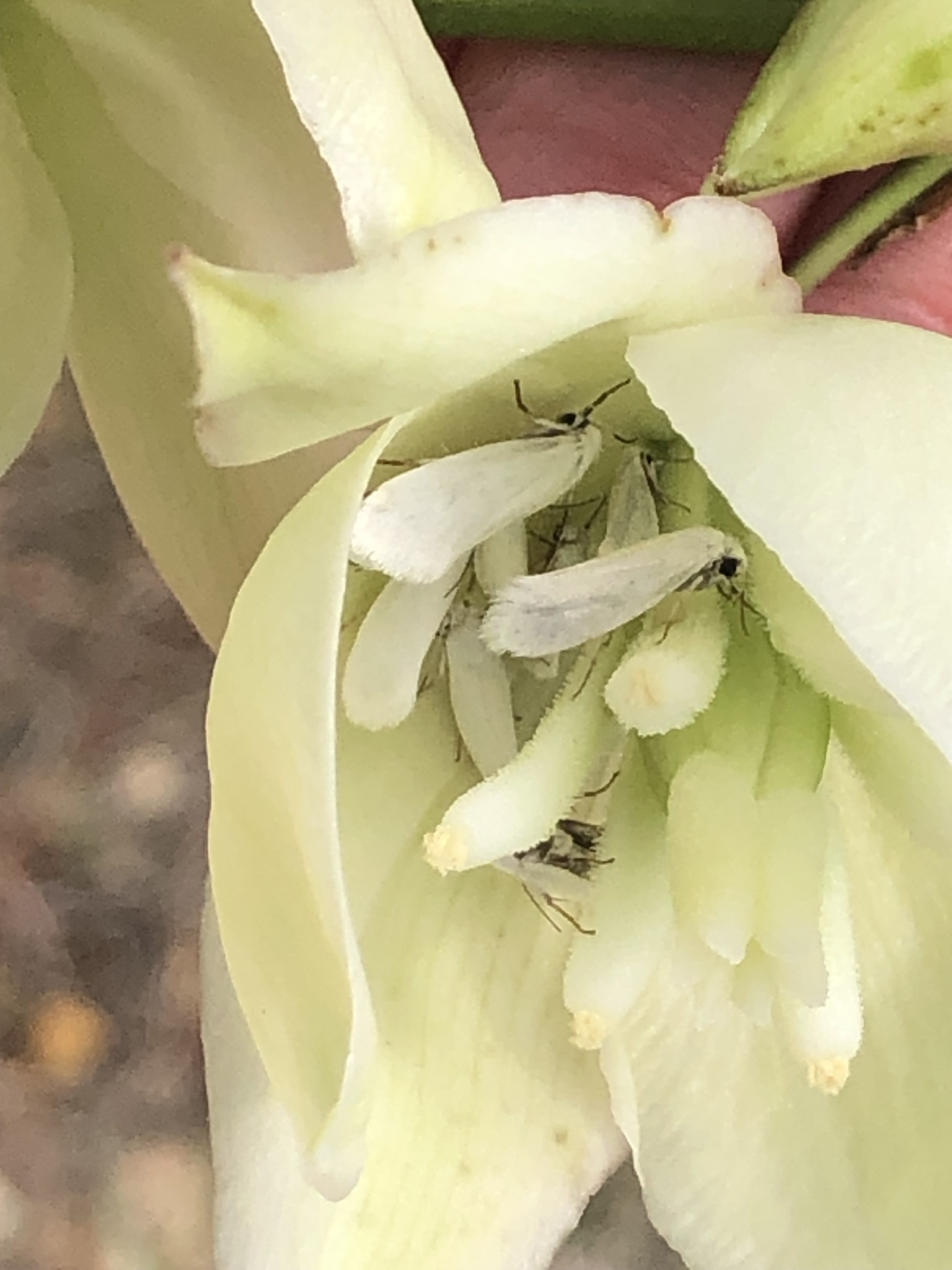
Yucca moths inside a yucca flower, Candler County, Georgia

Yuccas have a very specialized mutualistic system of pollination. Yucca moths in genus Tegeticula or Parategeticula pollinate the flowers and then lay their eggs in the seed capsules of yuccas. Some species of Tegeticula provide no benefit to the yuccas, laying eggs but not pollinating the flowers due to lacking the specialized parts for carrying pollen. Almost all species are pollinated by one or more species of these moths with one species, Aloe yucca (Yucca aloifolia), documented to revert away from mutualism to a generalist pollinator when the moths are absent. This mutualism was first documented by Charles Valentine Riley in 1873, and its discovery elicited much excitement in the scientific community. In a 1874 letter to his friend Joseph Dalton Hooker, Darwin called it "the most wonderful case of fertilisation ever published".

Instances of animal behavior that are exclusively aimed at pollination of plants, rather than just accompanying the animal gathering food, are quite rare. Female yucca moths have tentacle-like mouth parts that they use to gather pollen and then to deposit it on the reproductive parts. In the 150 years following the discovery of this relationship it became one of the most famous of the documented plant and animal mutualisms along with the fig wasps and fig trees. The association between the yuccas and the yucca moths is quite ancient, with a molecular clock estimate that it began between 51.3 and 31.7 million years ago with them becoming pollinators 35.6 million years ago ±9 million years.

About two-thirds of the moth species are limited to just one species of yucca. There is some evidence that the moths that visit a single species are guided to the flowers by distinct scents. All yucca moths species gather together inside of blooms to mate. The females of Tegeticula gather pollen and then pierce the yucca ovaries or styles to lay their eggs. After this, they deposit their load of pollen to ensure the development of seeds. The female Parategeticula moths cut grooves into flower stems, petals, or other parts to lay their eggs, but also use their mouthparts to deposit pollen on stigmas and into styles. In order to limit the numbers of seeds eaten by moth larvae, yucca plants abort fruits with large numbers of eggs deposited within them, but also drop fruits without sufficient pollination to produce a minimum number of seeds.

Though the reduction or local extinction of yucca moths can reduce the fertility of seeds or the numbers produced, there is not yet evidence that it reduces the populations of yuccas as they are relatively long lived. The scientist Robert William Cruden and his collaborators speculated in 1976 that yucca species are limited to lower elevations by the inability of their moth pollinators to tolerate colder temperatures at high elevations. Yuccas continue to be an important subject of study because of the simple coevolutionary competition and their relatively exclusive relationship.

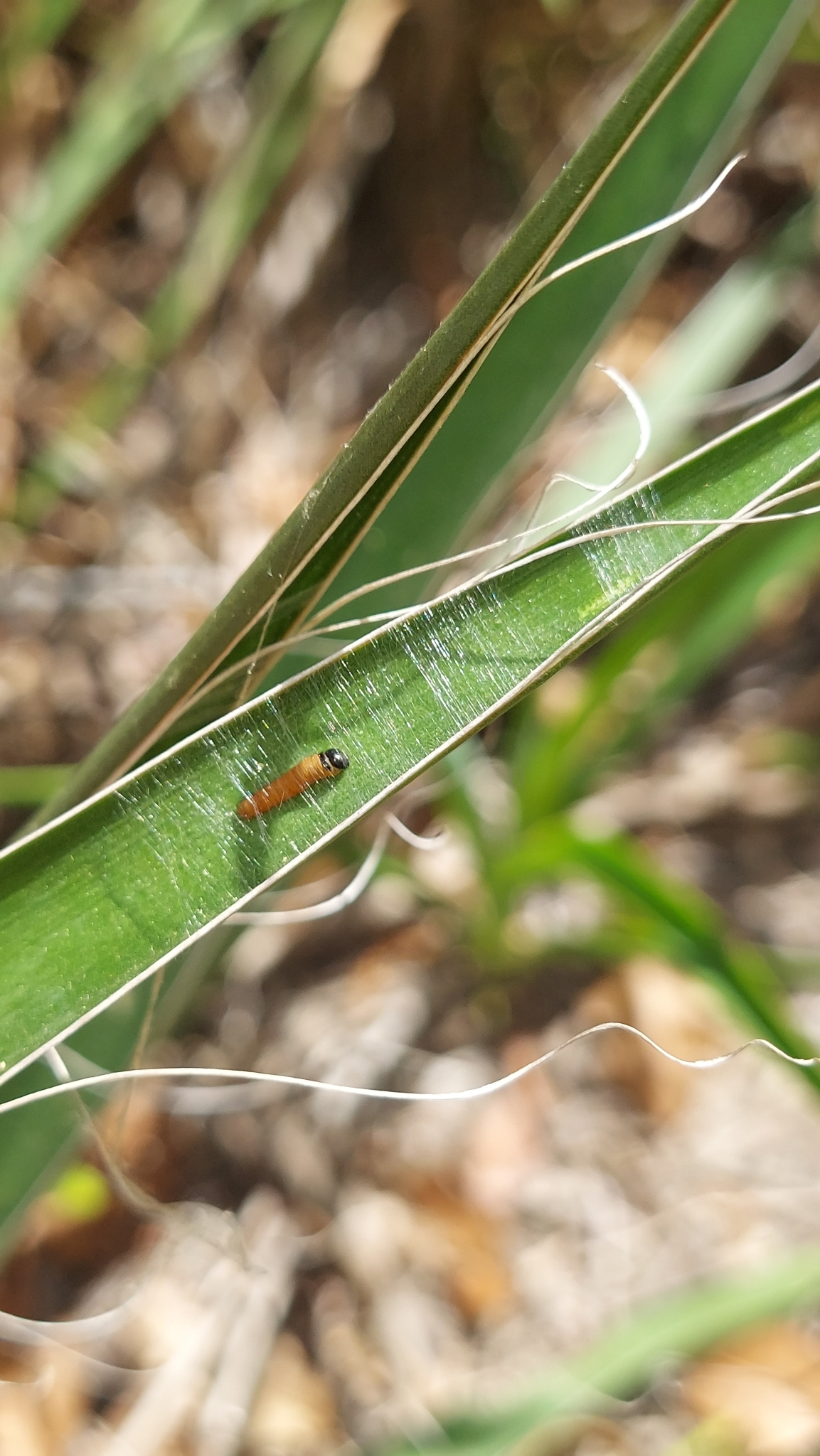
Larva of a yucca giant-skipper butterfly on a yucca leaf in Florida

Besides the yucca moths, a number of other insect species depend upon yuccas for food. The bogus yucca moths (Prodoxus) lay their eggs on yucca species, but do not pollinate the flowers. They also do not eat the seeds, instead feeding on fruits, stems, or leaves, frequently forming gall-like structures. Yucca species are the host plants for the caterpillars of the widespread but uncommon yucca giant-skipper butterfly (Megathymus yuccae), which is found across the southern United States and northern Mexico. The ursine giant skipper butterfly (Megathymus ursus), from southern Arizona, southern New Mexico, western Texas, and Nuevo León, feeds on yuccas such as Schott's yucca (Yucca × schottii) and datil yucca (Yucca baccata), as does the more northerly Strecker's giant skipper (Megathymus streckeri), though it prefers smaller species of yucca. The giant skippers (Megathymini) are species that feed in the roots of yuccas and inside the leaves of agaves. Beetle herbivores include yucca weevils in the family Curculionidae. Some species of darkling beetle (Tenebrionidae) also feed on parts related to the stigma or the parts connecting them to the ovary as well as mating inside the flowers.

In desert environments, yuccas are an important part of the ecology, improving the environment by enriching the soil with organic material and reducing erosion. The shelter the yuccas provide attracts small animals, and their waste and remains concentrate nutrients in the immediately surrounding areas, creating a microhabitat alongside small plants. Tree-like species of yucca, such as the Joshua tree, provide nesting sites for birds and materials for small rodents. Their fallen trunks provide shelter for lizards. In the plains biome, species like Yucca glauca provide perches for birds as well as cover for small birds, small reptiles, and small mammals. In the plains, yuccas are not a significant source of food for either native grazers or for livestock, but in desert environments cattle will learn to avoid the sharp ends of the leaves and eat the base instead. Similarly, goats will eat the whole head of leaves when there is no other forage available. Under heavy grazing pressure grasses in the southwest are replaced by resistant native shrubs.

Yucca seeds remain viable for many years in the environment due to being well protected and having plenty of energy reserves. To start germination they require a large amount of moisture. Due to the scarcity of water in much of their habitat the reproduction of yuccas by seed is limited and the majority of new plants sprout from rhizomes.

=== Conservation ===
According to the International Union for Conservation of Nature, only five species are endangered: plains yucca (Yucca campestris), nodding yucca (Yucca cernua), quim (Yucca lacandonica), pitilla (Yucca endlichiana), and Yucca queretaroensis.

== Uses ==
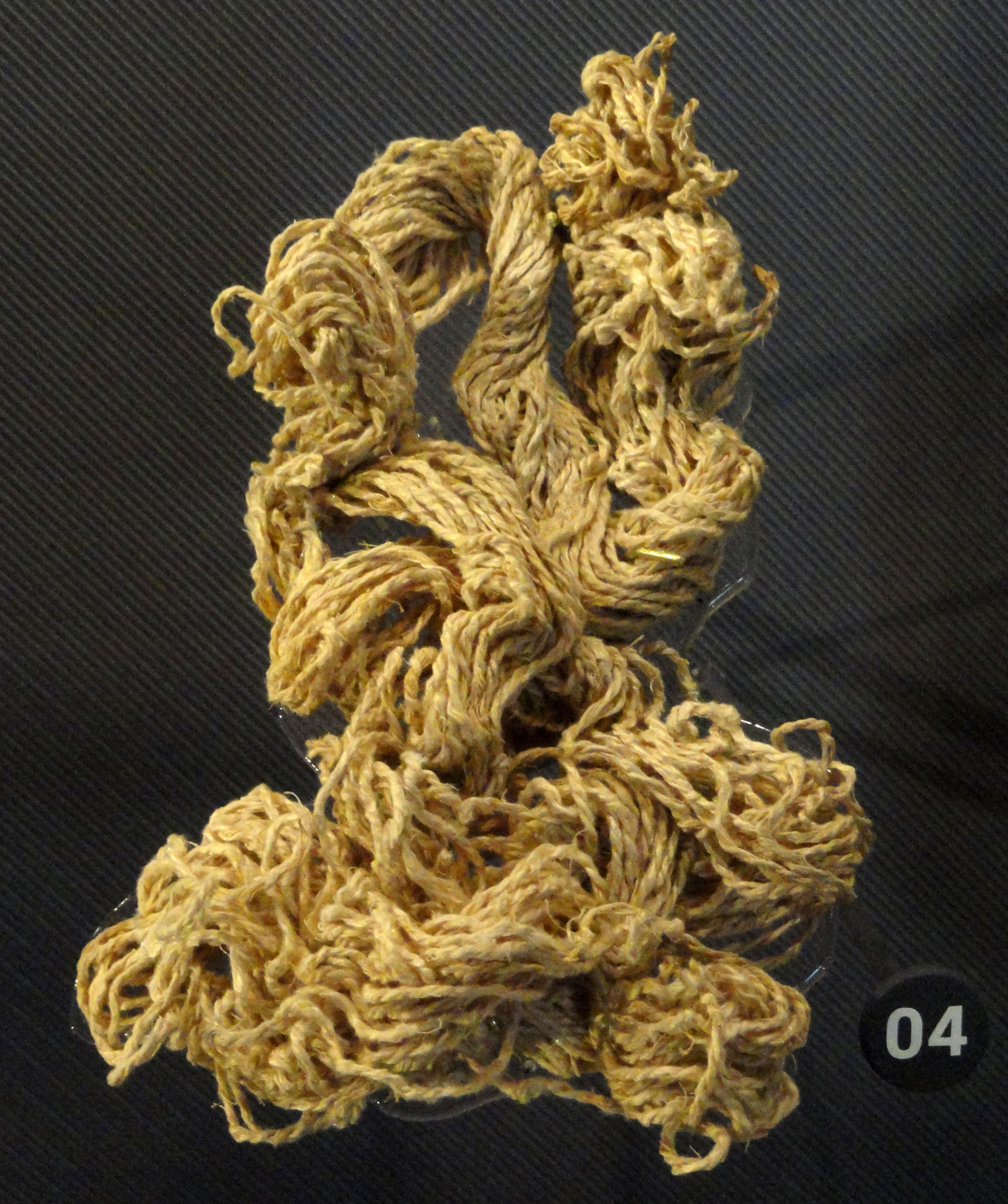
Spun yucca-fiber cordage, c. 900 CE – c. 1100 CE, Kayenta Anasazi, Twin Cave House, Arizona

Yuccas are widely grown as ornamental plants in gardens and landscaping. Yucca plants have provided food and fibers to humans. Several yucca species have fleshy fruits that are edible, although the seeds they contain are not. Additionally, the flowers are edible both cooked and raw. The young flowering stems of some species are edible when cooked. The leaves, roots, stems, and hearts of the plants are all inedible due to high levels of saponins.

Yucca rhizomes have been extensively used to produce soaps, shampoos, detergents and are still used to a lesser extent for this today. The leaves are still used to make trays and baskets in the southwestern US. Research efforts have been made into making use of the fibers as a substitute for sisal or abacá. Efforts to cultivate existing North American yucca plants for their fibers were abandoned after conclusion of the Second World War. While the strength of yucca fibers is good, their harvest is uneconomical unless alternatives are unavailable.

Yucca extract, specifically from the rhizomes of Mojave yucca (Yucca schidigera), is used as a foaming agent in some beverages such as root beer and soda. Yucca powder is produced from yucca plants. Harvested logs are squeezed and the sap produced is then evaporated to produce the powder, which is used in food, cosmetics, pharmaceuticals, and as animal feed additives. The extract is also used to reduce surface tension in water to allow it to more easily penetrate into heavy soils during irrigation.

=== Cultivation ===
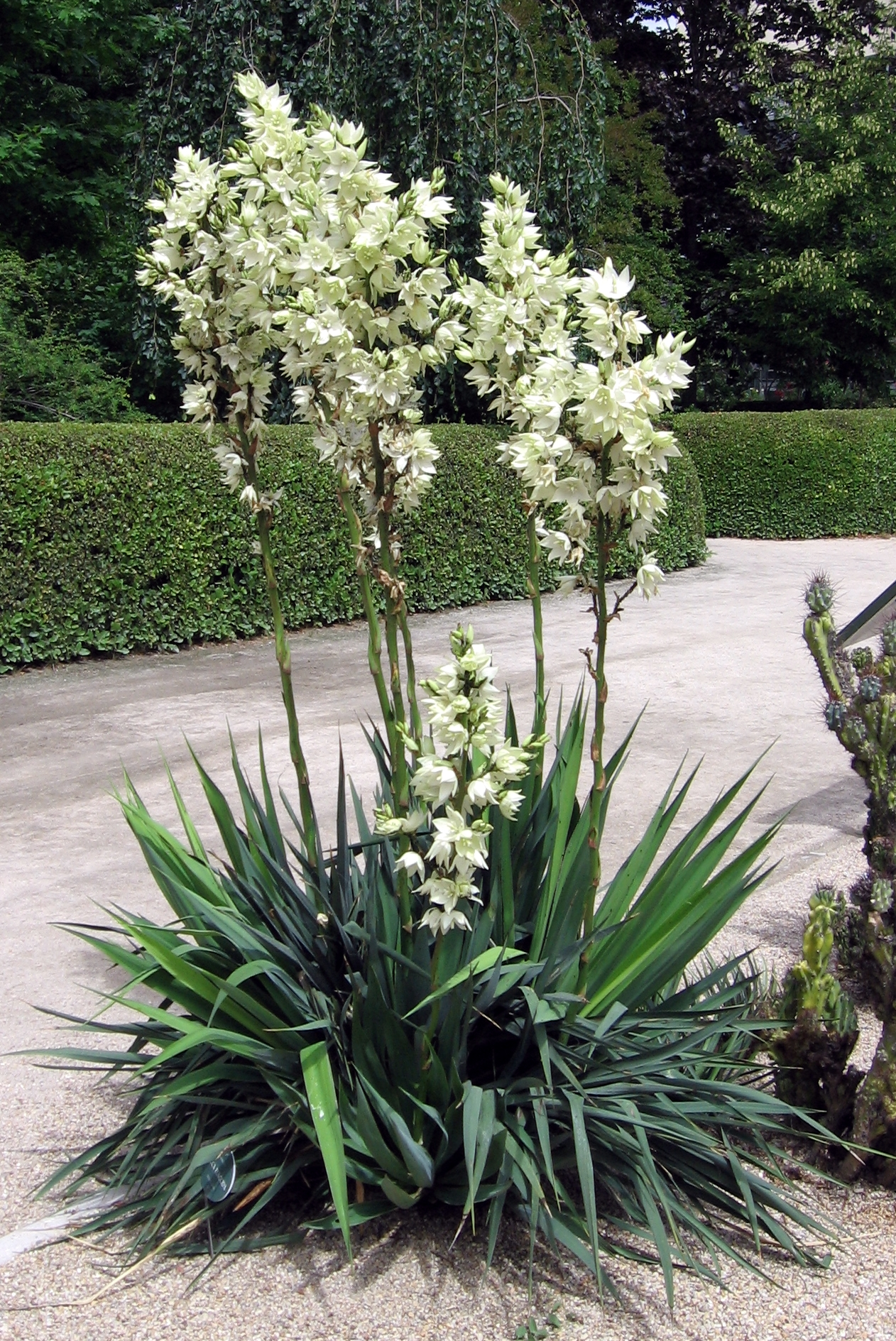
Yucca flaccida in the Royal Botanical Garden of Madrid

Very soon after the start of the Columbian exchange of plants across the Atlantic Ocean, yuccas were planted in European gardens as ornamental plants with the first recorded bloom in England in 1604. Though they were planted for productive uses in Mexico prior to the Spanish Conquest, it is not recorded if they used them for ornamental purposes. The use of yucca as an ornamental was not well documented in the early early history of the United States, though Thomas Jefferson did grow Yucca filamentosa, which he called bear grass.

The spineless yucca (Yucca gigantea) is used as a common houseplant, though sometimes under the mistaken name of Yucca elephantipes. When tropical yuccas are grown indoors they do not reach the large sizes they can achieve outdoors.

Yuccas are widely grown as architectural plants in landscape design due to the distinctive silhouette of their leaves. They are also particularly valued for their resistance to high temperatures and drought conditions. They tolerate a range of conditions but are best grown in full sun in subtropical or mild temperate areas. Some of the larger species of yucca are used as living barriers and fences. All yuccas require good drainage, but are tolerant of difficult conditions such as dry and poor soils. In cold climates when there is enough precipitation to collect in the crown of the yucca plant, the freeze-thaw cycle can damage the plant and provide an entry for damaging fungi or bacteria.

Several species of yucca can be grown outdoors in temperate climates, including:

- Yucca filamentosa
- Yucca flaccida
- Yucca glauca
- Yucca gloriosa
- Yucca recurvifolia
- Yucca rostrata
- Yucca × schottii
- Yucca treculeana

=== Gastronomy ===
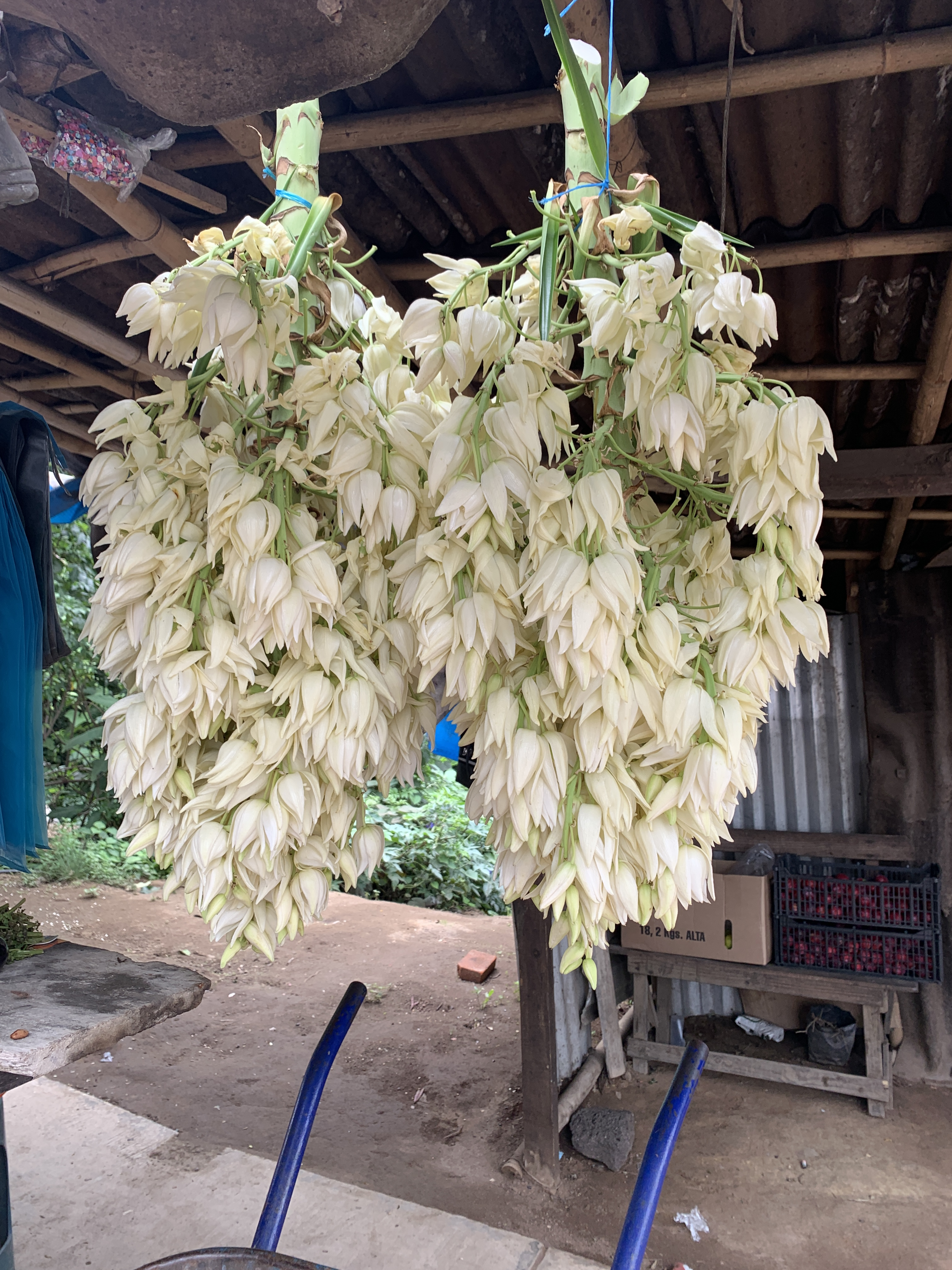
Harvested yucca flowers on their way to Naolinco, in Veracruz, Mexico

The flower petals are commonly eaten in Central America and Mexico, but the plant's reproductive organs (the anthers and ovaries) are first removed because of their bitterness. Petals have a flavor reminiscent of lettuce.

In addition to being called flor de izote in Mexico, yucca flowers are also called flores de palma (palm flowers) in Hidalgo and San Luis Potosí, guayas, cuaresmeñas, or chochos in Veracruz, and chochas in Tamaulipas. In rural central Mexico, they are eaten as food, as they were in pre-Hispanic times. Bunches are sold in public markets and eaten while very fresh and tender, before they become bitter. They are also cooked with scrambled eggs or in green chili salsa in this area.

Another way that yucca flowers are served is in a sauce after roasting where they are called chochos in tomachile. It is served this way as a snack or with salads in the Los Tuxtlas region of Veracruz. In the northern Mexican state of Coahuila, yucca flowers are considered a traditional food for Lent.

In Guatemala, they are boiled and eaten with lemon juice. In El Salvador, the tender tips of stems are eaten and known locally as cogollo de izote.

These Central American and Mexican culinary traditions have been imported to the United States to areas such as Los Angeles where the flowers of the giant yucca are eaten in season in scrambled eggs, pupusas, and tacos. Before being used as an ingredient, the petals are often blanched for five minutes, though they are also eaten raw in small amounts.

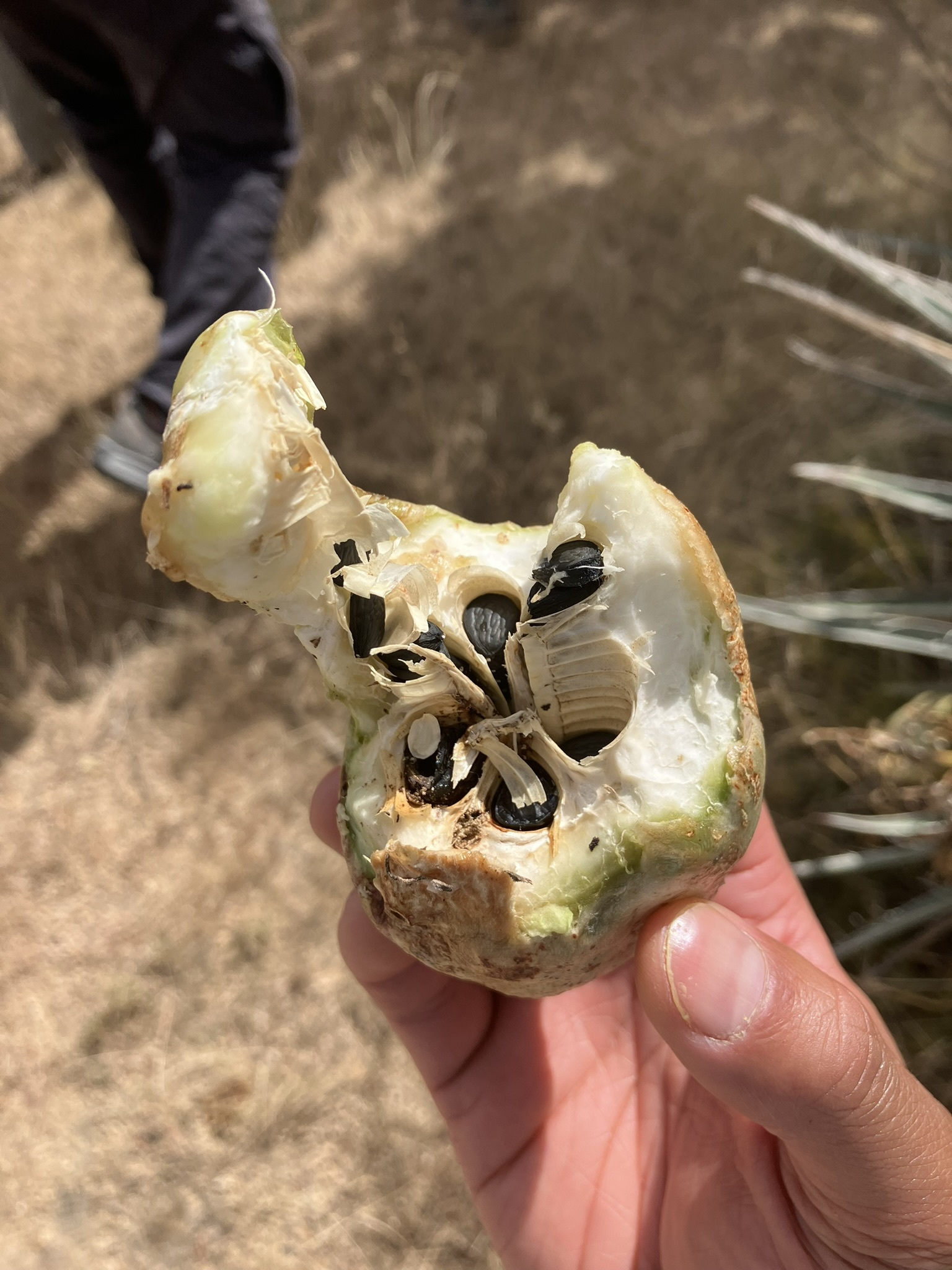
An opened banana yucca (Yucca baccata) fruit, Mojave National Preserve

In Mexico, the fleshy fruits of some yucca species are called datiles, the same word as for the fruit of the date palm, though they are unrelated. These fruits are used to produce alcoholic drinks. The edible fruit of the banana yucca becomes significantly sweeter when cooked. If puréed it is similar to applesauce. Raw fruits have a flavor similar to straightneck squash.

=== Traditional uses ===
Yuccas were and are one of the most important plants outside of cultivation for both ancient and contemporary native peoples in the Southwestern US. They have a wide range of uses, from fibers to food. Some of these uses are in fishing nets, in making paintbrushes, in combs, sandals, mats, blankets, and sewing. The dried and split trunks of yuccas are soft and work well for a hearth in starting fires via friction. The use of items woven from yucca leaves dates from the archaic period, 8000 to 1000 BCE.

The young stalks of the soaptree yucca (Yucca elata) have been consumed by the Mescalero Apache. They are roasted over an open fire and then peeled to eat the soft interior. The flower stalks of Great Plains yucca (Yucca glauca) have been prepared similarly as recorded in the 1930s. The flowers of the same species were frequently boiled to remove their bitter flavor or the flower pistil, the most bitter part, was removed. The cooking of banana yucca fruits has continued to the present day among the Hopi. The use of yucca shampoo for hair and to wash traditional rugs continues with the Navajo. The Jicarilla Apaches will similarly use it to clean woven baskets.

== Symbolism ==
The yucca flower is the state flower of New Mexico in the southwestern United States. No species name is given in the law; however, the Secretary of State of New Mexico website notes that the soaptree yucca (Yucca elata) is one of the more widespread species in New Mexico. It was officially designated as the state flower in 1927 by the state legislature after a survey of state students with the support of the New Mexico Federation of Women's Clubs.

The yucca, specifically Yucca gigantea, is the national flower of El Salvador, where it is known as flor de izote. It was officially designated the floral emblem in 1995. Salvadorans often compare their ability to recover from periods of repression to the ability of the flor de izote to grow back after being cut.
