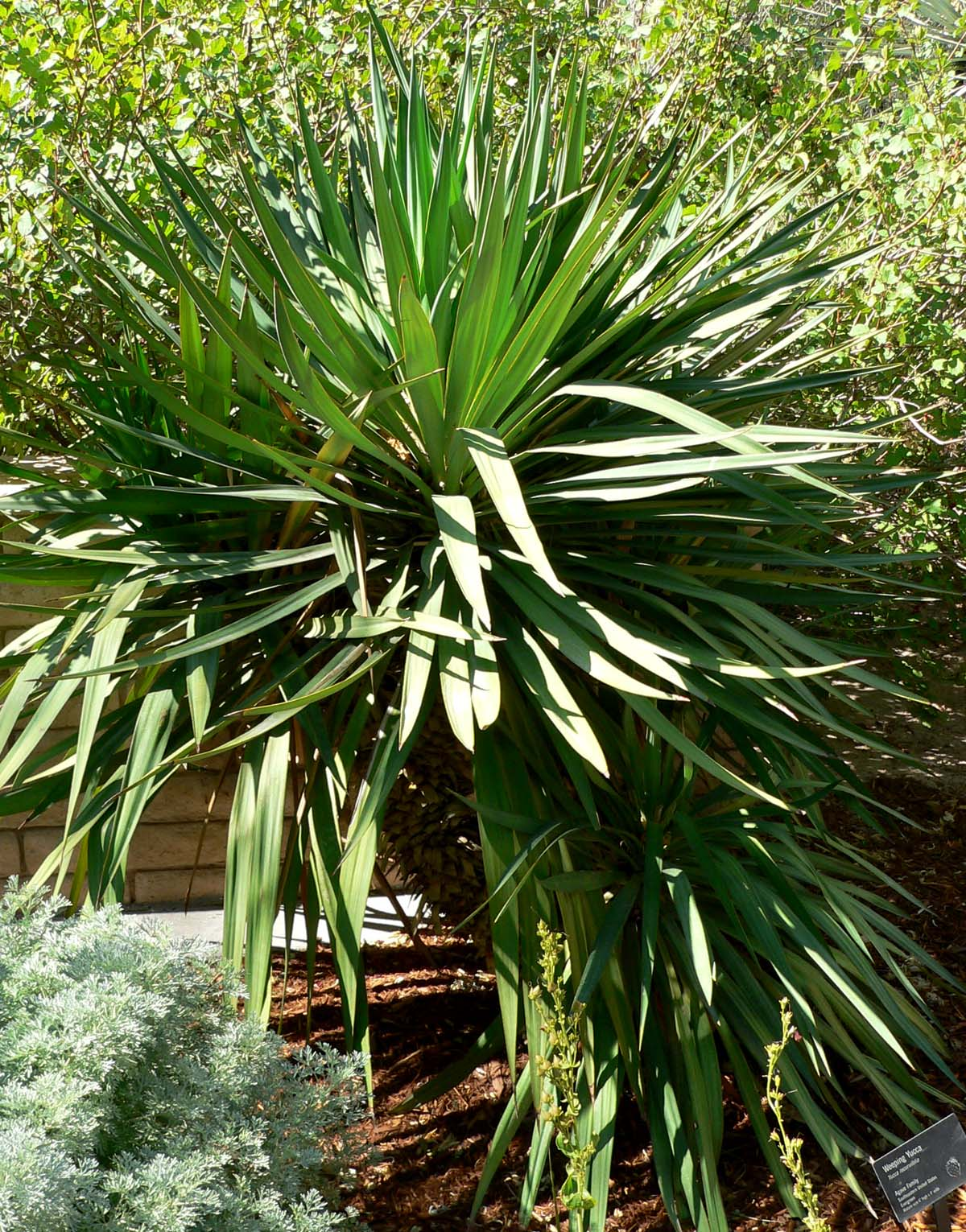

Scientific classification
- Kingdom: Plantae
- Clade: Tracheophytes
- Clade: Angiosperms
- Clade: Monocots
- Order: Asparagales
- Family: Asparagaceae
- Subfamily: Agavoideae
- Genus: Yucca
- Species: Y. gloriosa
- Variety: Y. g. var. tristis

Trinomial name
- Yucca gloriosa var. tristis Carrière

= Yucca gloriosa var. tristis =

Variety of flowering plant

Yucca gloriosa var. tristis (syn. Yucca recurvifolia, Yucca gloriosa var. recurvifolia), known as curve-leaf yucca, curved-leaved Spanish dagger weeping yucca or pendulous yucca, is a variety of Yucca gloriosa. It is often grown as an ornamental plant, and is native to the Southern United States, from coastal southeastern Virginia south through Florida and west to Texas. In contrast to Y. gloriosa var. tristis, the leaves of Y. gloriosa var. gloriosa are hard stiff, erect and narrower.

Yucca gloriosa var. tristis is often found in sandy habits like coastal sand dunes and beach scrub along with species of Opuntia. Growing a trunk often 1.2 to 1.8 metres (4 to 6 feet) high, this yucca will often branch and sucker to form colonies in the area it is planted in. Cultivated in the warmer areas of Europe and the parts of Australia. In the United States a popular landscape plant in beach resort areas along the lower East Coast from coastal Maryland to Florida. It (or its cultivar(s)) is a recipient of the Royal Horticultural Society's Award of Garden Merit under the Yucca recurvifolia name.
