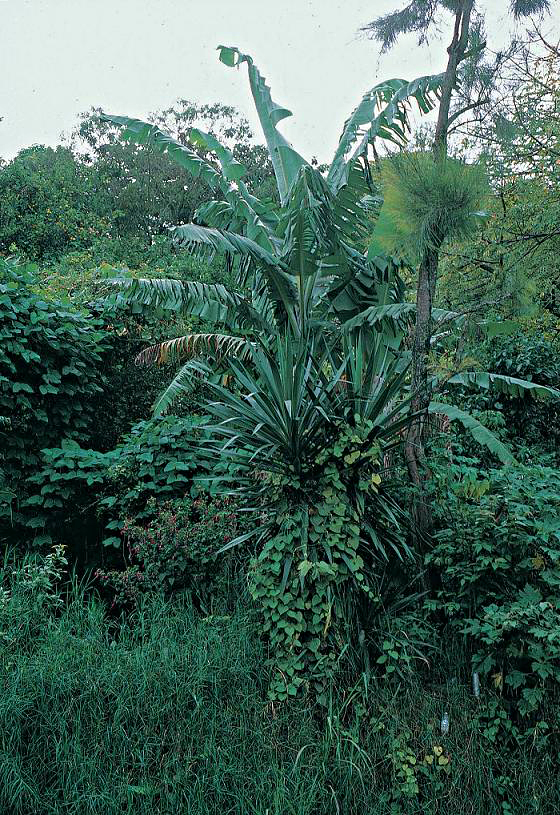
- Y. lacandonica (center)

Conservation status
- Endangered (IUCN 3.1)

Scientific classification
- Kingdom: Plantae
- Clade: Tracheophytes
- Clade: Angiosperms
- Clade: Monocots
- Order: Asparagales
- Family: Asparagaceae
- Subfamily: Agavoideae
- Genus: Yucca
- Species: Y. lacandonica

Binomial name
- Yucca lacandonica Gómez Pompa & J.Valdés

= Yucca lacandonica =

Tropical yucca Yuca epífita

Species of epiphyte

Yucca lacandonica is a plant species in the yucca genus with the common name "tropical yucca." It is native to Belize and to southern Mexico, the states of Chiapas, Veracruz, Tabasco, Quintana Roo, Campeche, and Yucatán. It is uniquely the only epiphytic species in the genus, although it has been reported to grow terrestrially as well.

Yucca lacandonica usually grows in tree branches about 20–25 m above the ground. It has a trunk up to 3 m long, 25 cm wide at the base, partially horizontal. The leaves are long and narrowly lanceolate, tapering at both ends, up to 85 cm long, about 5 cm wide at the widest point. Its flowers are white, up to 7 cm across, with cream-colored stamens and pistils as well as tepals narrowing to a long point at the tip. It produces juicy, elongated fruits up to 10 cm long.
