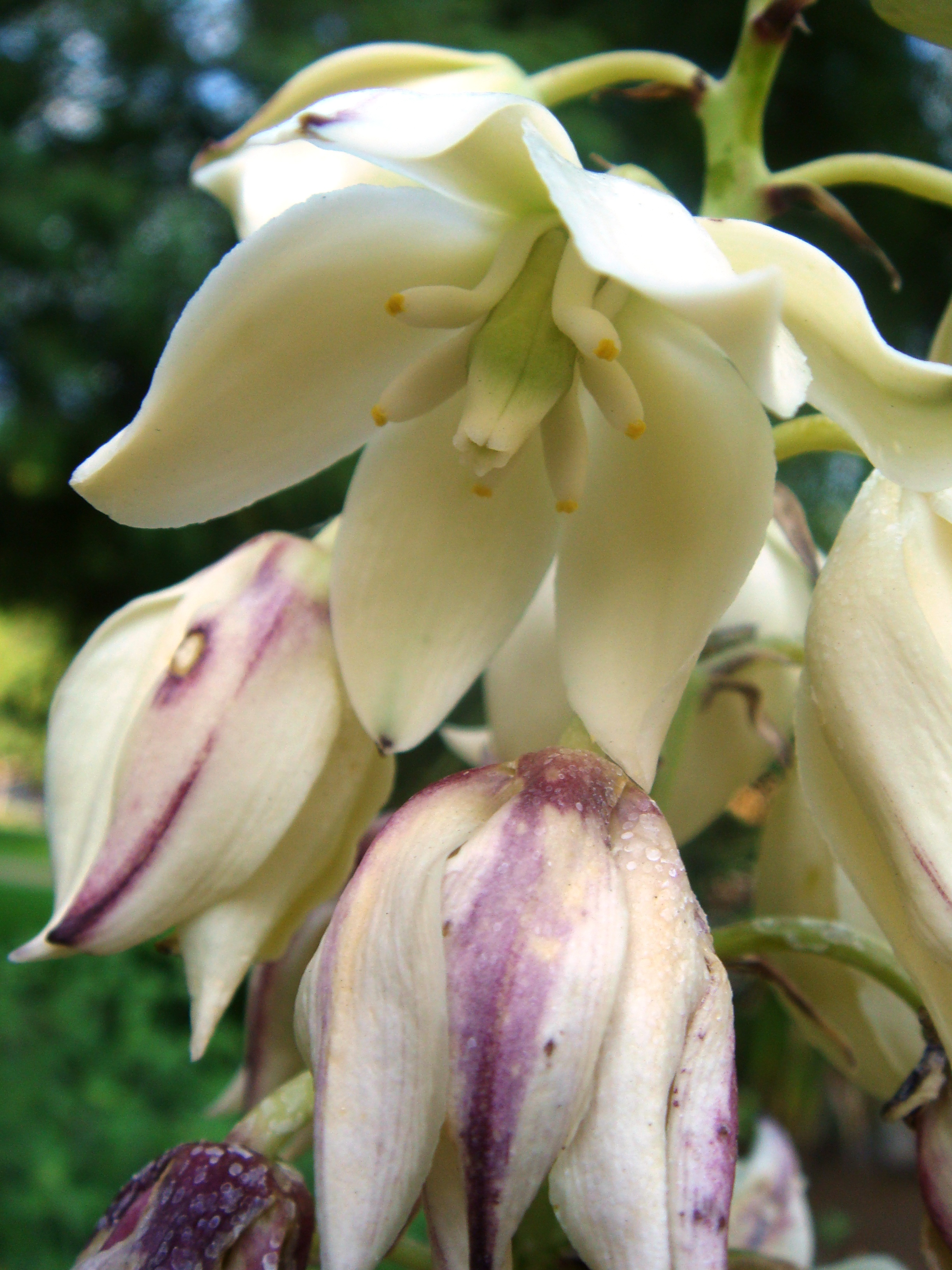
- Yucca aloifolia, cultivated, Arizona State University, Tempe, Arizona

Conservation status
- Data Deficient (IUCN 3.1)

- Secure (NatureServe)

Scientific classification
- Kingdom: Plantae
- Clade: Tracheophytes
- Clade: Angiosperms
- Clade: Monocots
- Order: Asparagales
- Family: Asparagaceae
- Subfamily: Agavoideae
- Genus: Yucca
- Species: Y. aloifolia

Binomial name
- Yucca aloifolia L.

Synonyms
- Dracaena lenneana Regel; Sarcoyucca aloifolia (L.) Lindinger; Yucca aloifolia var. arcuata (Haw.) Trel.; Yucca aloifolia f. arcuata (Haw.) Voss; Yucca aloifolia var. conspicua (Haw.) Engelm.; Yucca aloifolia f. conspicua (Haw.) Engelm.; Yucca aloifolia f. crenulata (Haw.) Voss; Yucca aloifolia var. draconis (L.) Engelm.; Yucca aloifolia f. draconis (L.) Voss; Yucca aloifolia var. flexifolia J.Bommer; Yucca aloifolia var. gigantea Sprenger; Yucca aloifolia var. marginata J.Bommer; Yucca aloifolia var. menandi Trel.; Yucca aloifolia var. purpurea Baker; Yucca aloifolia var. quadricolor-variegata Carrière; Yucca aloifolia var. roseomarginata Regel; Yucca aloifolia var. serratifolia Sprenger; Yucca aloifolia var. stenophylla J.Bommer; Yucca aloifolia var. tenuifolia (Haw.) Trel.; Yucca aloifolia f. tenuifolia (Haw.) Voss; Yucca aloifolia f. tenuifolia (Haw.) Trel.; Yucca aloifolia var. tricolor J.Bommer; Yucca aloifolia var. variegata Naudin; Yucca aloifolia var. versicolor Carrière; Yucca aloifolia var. yucatana (Engelm) Trel.; Yucca arcuata Haw.; Yucca atkinsii Baker; Yucca conspicua Haw.; Yucca crenulata Haw.; Yucca draconis L.; Yucca haruckeriana Crantz; Yucca parmentieri Carrière; Yucca jacksonii E.J.Whalen; Yucca purpurea Baker; Yucca quadricolor Baker; Yucca serrulata Haw.; Yucca striata auct.; Yucca tenuifolia Haw.; Yucca tricolor Baker; Yucca yucatana Engelm.

= Yucca aloifolia =

Spanish bayonet

Species of flowering plant

Yucca aloifolia is the type species for the genus Yucca. Common names include aloe yucca, dagger plant, and Spanish bayonet. It grows in sandy soils, especially on sand dunes along the coast.

== Range ==
Yucca aloifolia is native to the Atlantic and Gulf Coasts of the United States from southern Virginia south to Florida and west to the Texas Gulf Coast, to Mexico along the Yucatán coast, and to Bermuda, and parts of the Caribbean. Normally, Yucca aloifolia is grown in USDA zones 8 through 11. It is a popular landscape plant in beach areas along the lower East Coast from Virginia to Florida.

Yucca aloifolia has become naturalized in Bahamas, Argentina, Uruguay, Italy, Pakistan, South Africa, Queensland, New South Wales, and Mauritania. It is common in gardens and parks of the Iberian Peninsula.

== Description ==
Yucca aloifolia has an erect trunk, 3–5 in (7.6–12.7 cm) in diameter, reaching up to 5–20 ft (1.5–6.1 m) tall before it becomes top heavy and topples over. When this occurs, the tip turns upward and keeps on growing. The trunk is armed with sharp pointed straplike leaves with fine-toothed edges, each about 2 ft (0.61 m) long. The young leaves near the growing tip stand erect; older ones are reflexed downward, and the oldest wither and turn brown, hanging around the lower trunk like a Hawaiian skirt. Eventually the tip of the trunk develops a 2 ft (0.61 m) long spike of white, purplish-tinged flowers, each blossom about 4 in (12.7 cm) across. After flowering, the trunk stops growing, but one or more lateral buds are soon formed, and the uppermost becomes a new terminal shoot. Yucca aloifolia also produces new buds, or offshoots, near the base of the trunk, forming the typical thicket often observed in dry sandy and scrub beach areas of the southeastern United States.

Yucca aloifolia flowers are white and showy, sometimes tinged purplish, so that the plant is popular as an ornamental. Fruits are elongated, fleshy, up to 5 cm long. It is widely planted in hot climates and arid environments.

The tree has a short lifespan and can live up to 50 years.

== Uses ==
The fruit is eaten by both birds and humans, and the flowers can be eaten cooked or raw.

Yucca aloifolia's roots can be used as soap and shampoo.

== Gallery ==
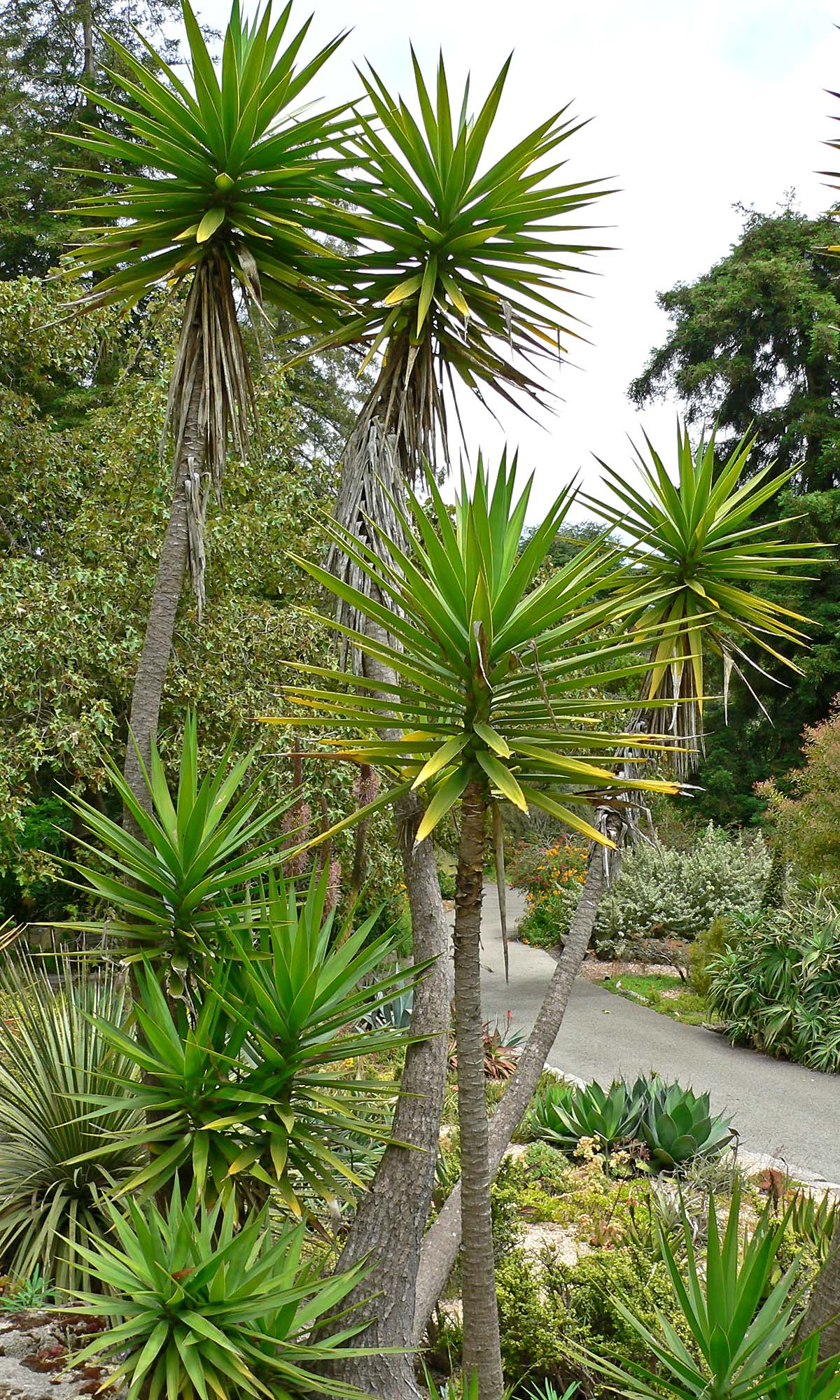
Yucca aloifolia at the San Francisco Botanical Garden

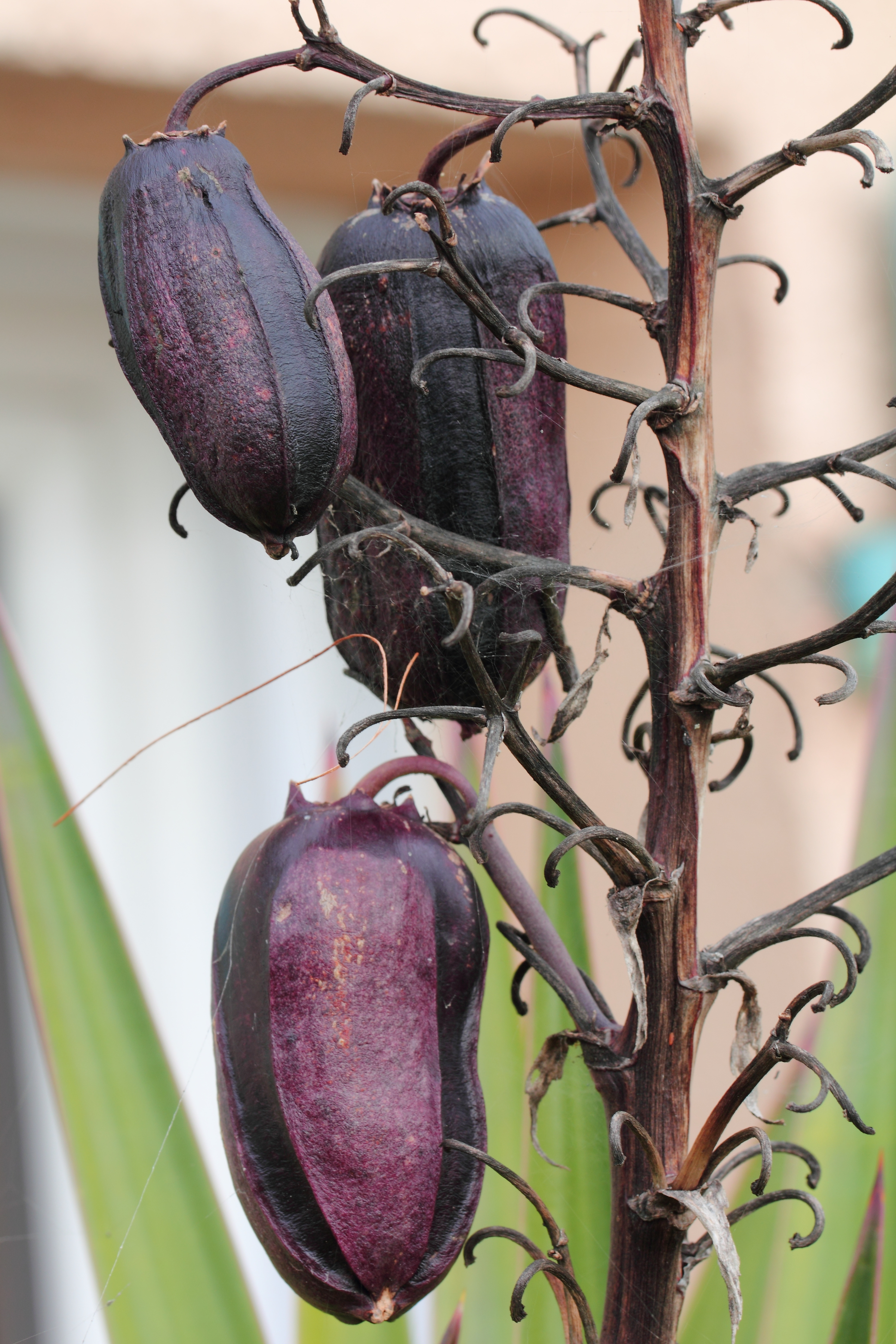
Yucca aloifolia purplish fruits

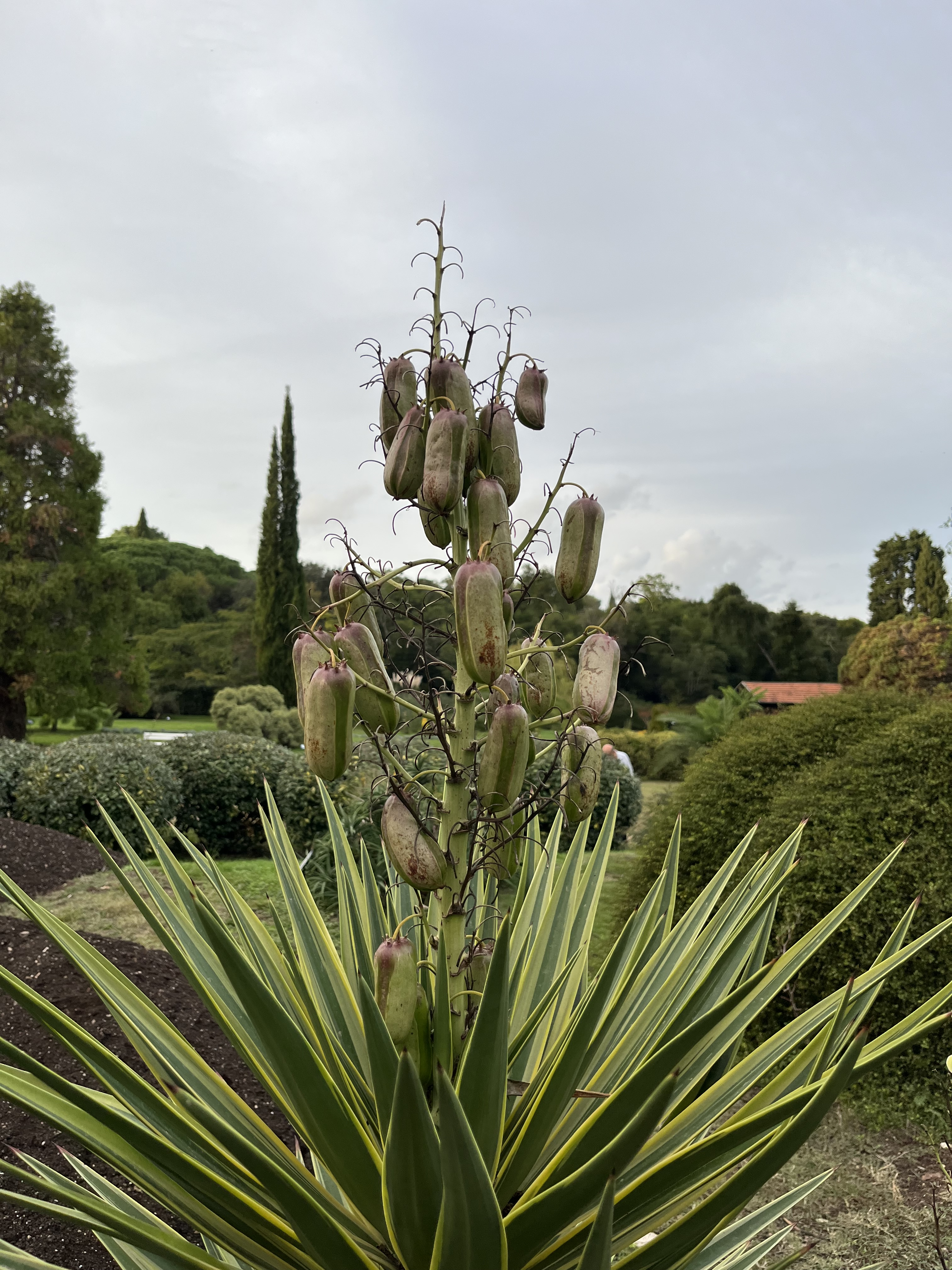
Yucca aloifolia greenish fruits
