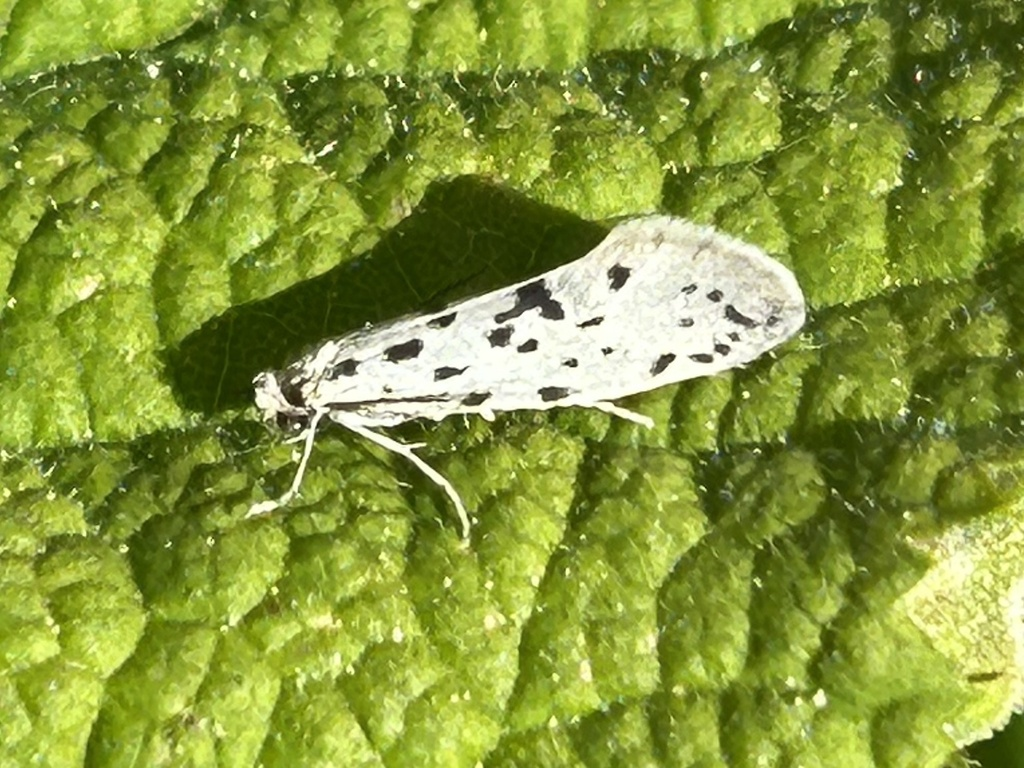

Scientific classification
- Kingdom: Animalia
- Phylum: Arthropoda
- Clade: Pancrustacea
- Class: Insecta
- Order: Lepidoptera
- Family: Prodoxidae
- Genus: Greya
- Species: G. piperella

Binomial name
- Greya piperella (Busck, 1904)

Synonyms
- Incurvaria piperella Busck, 1904

= Greya piperella =

Species of moth

Greya piperella is a moth of the family Prodoxidae. In North America it is found from southern British Columbia to central Oregon, east to western Montana. There is an isolated population in central California and the species is possibly also present in New Mexico and Utah. The habitat consists of open, grassy pine forests or rockfaces in open country.

The wingspan is 16.5-21.5 mm. Adults drink nectar from the flowers of the larval hosts.

The larvae feed on Heuchera cylindrica and Heuchera micrantha. The larvae mine the peduncle of the host plant.
