= Martella =

Martella may refer to:

== People ==
- Andrea Martella (born 1968), Italian politician
- Anthony Martella (born 2008), Canadian racing driver
- Brian Martella (born 1951), Australian rules football player
- Bruno Martella (born 1992), Italian football player
- Luigi Martella (1948–2015), Italian bishop
- Vincent Martella (born 1992), American actor, voice actor and singer

== Fictional characters ==
- Viv Martella, character in The Bill

== Animals ==
- Martella (spider), genus of ant mimicking jumping spider
- Parategeticula martella, moth of the family Prodoxidae
