= Yucca moth =

Yucca moth may refer to:

- Prodoxidae moth family
  - Parategeticula moths
  - Tegeticula moths
    - Tegeticula yuccasella
