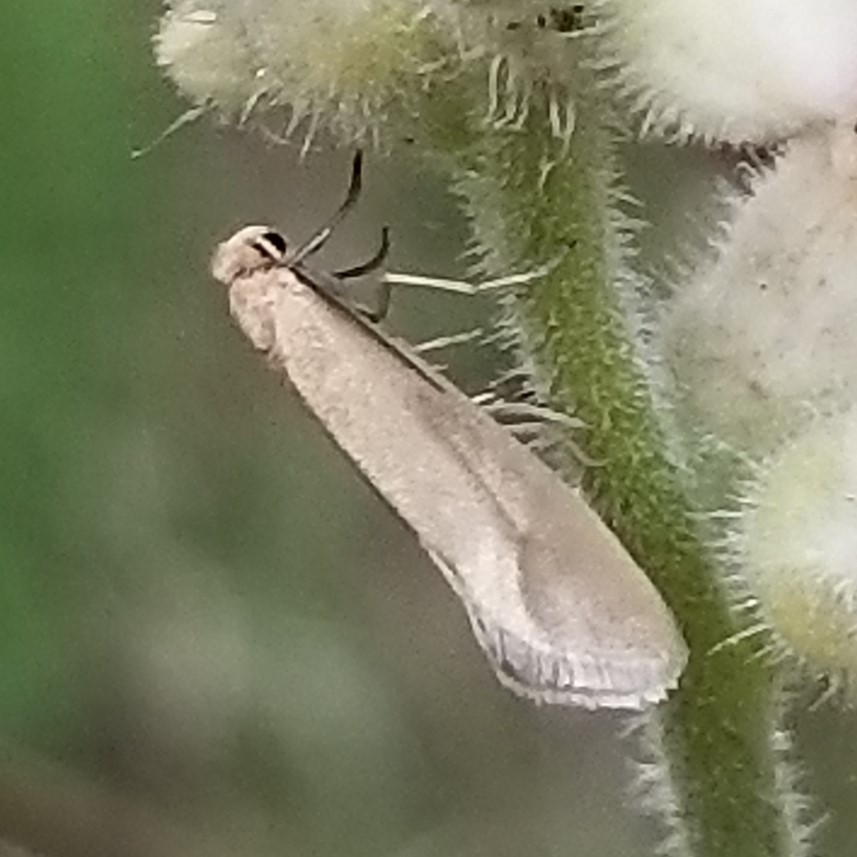

Scientific classification
- Kingdom: Animalia
- Phylum: Arthropoda
- Clade: Pancrustacea
- Class: Insecta
- Order: Lepidoptera
- Family: Prodoxidae
- Genus: Greya
- Species: G. enchrysa

Binomial name
- Greya enchrysa Davis & Pellmyr, 1992

= Greya enchrysa =

Species of moth

Greya enchrysa is a species of moth in the family Prodoxidae. It is found in open, grassy pine forests in the drier interior regions of southern British Columbia, Alberta, Washington, Oregon, Idaho and western Montana.

The wingspan is 15.5–20 mm.

The larvae feed on Heuchera cylindrica and Heuchera grossulariifolia. They initially live in a capsule of their host plant, feeding on the seeds.
