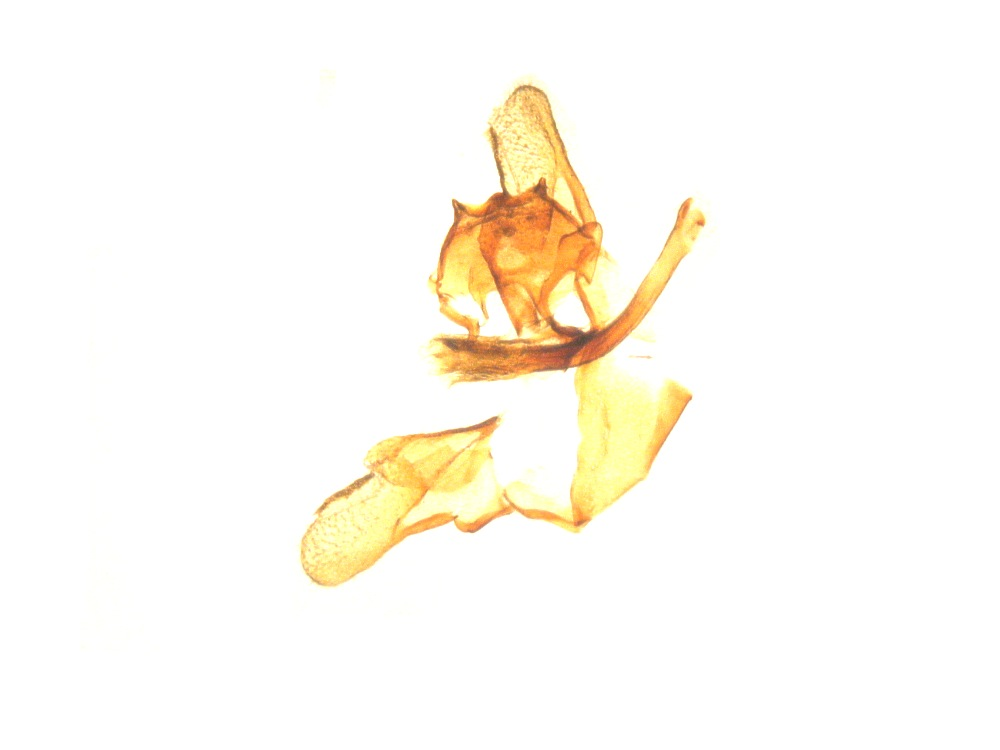
- Male genitalia

Scientific classification
- Kingdom: Animalia
- Phylum: Arthropoda
- Clade: Pancrustacea
- Class: Insecta
- Order: Lepidoptera
- Family: Prodoxidae
- Genus: Lampronia
- Species: L. pubicornis

Binomial name
- Lampronia pubicornis (Haworth, 1828)

Synonyms
- Capillaria pubicornis Haworth, 1828; ?Lampronia flavifrontella (Denis & Schiffermüller)

= Lampronia pubicornis =

Species of moth

Lampronia pubicornis is a moth of the family Prodoxidae. It is found in Ireland, Great Britain, France, Spain, Germany, Austria, Hungary and on Sicily, in addition to Venice and occasionally mainland Italy.

The wingspan is 12–14 mm. Head pale yellowish. Forewings relatively broader and with termen less oblique than in Lampronia tenuicornis, shining fuscous. Hindwings with hair-scales, grey.

The larvae feed on within the young shoots of Rosa pimpinellifolia.
