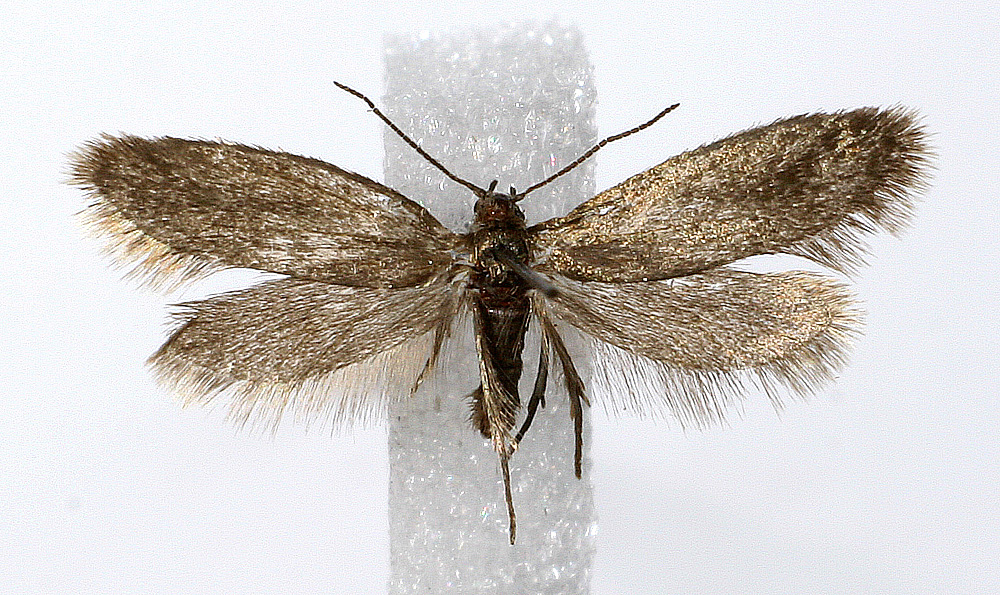

Scientific classification
- Kingdom: Animalia
- Phylum: Arthropoda
- Clade: Pancrustacea
- Class: Insecta
- Order: Lepidoptera
- Family: Prodoxidae
- Genus: Lampronia
- Species: L. standfussiella

Binomial name
- Lampronia standfussiella Zeller, 1839

= Lampronia standfussiella =

Species of moth

Lampronia standfussiella is a moth of the family Prodoxidae. It is found in central Europe, including the Alps, Germany, Austria and Poland, north to Finland and Sweden and northern Russia.

The wingspan is 9–13 millimetres (0.35–0.51 in).

The larvae probably feed on Rosa species. Larvae have been reported on Rosa majalis and Ribes spicatum.
