= Parategeticula tzoyatlella =

Scientific classification
- Kingdom: Animalia
- Phylum: Arthropoda
- Clade: Pancrustacea
- Class: Insecta
- Order: Lepidoptera
- Family: Prodoxidae
- Genus: Parategeticula
- Species: P. tzoyatlella

Binomial name
- Parategeticula tzoyatlella Pellmyr & Balcazar-Lara, 2000

Species of moth

Parategeticula tzoyatlella is a moth of the family Prodoxidae. It is found in the southern Mapimí area of the Chihuahuan Desert in Mexico.

The wingspan is 19–24 mm for males and 21-25.5 mm for females. Adults are on wing in March.

The larvae feed on Yucca rostrata and Yucca rigida.

== Etymology ==
The species name is derived from tzoyatl, the Nahuatl name for Yucca rostrata.
