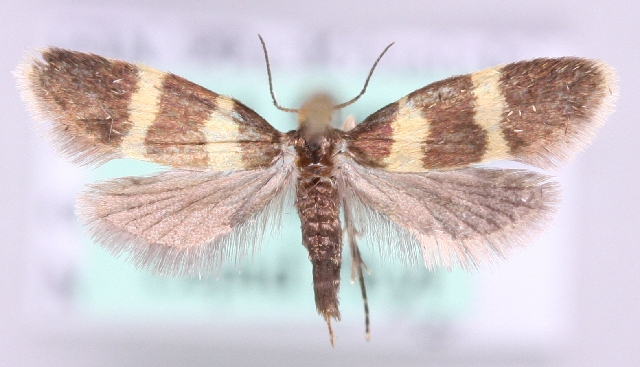

Scientific classification
- Kingdom: Animalia
- Phylum: Arthropoda
- Clade: Pancrustacea
- Class: Insecta
- Order: Lepidoptera
- Family: Prodoxidae
- Genus: Lampronia
- Species: L. redimitella

Binomial name
- Lampronia redimitella (Lienig & Zeller, 1846)

Synonyms
- Tinea redimitella Lienig & Zeller, 1846

= Lampronia redimitella =

Species of moth

Lampronia redimitella is a moth of the family Prodoxidae. It is found in Fennoscandia, the Baltic region, Poland, the Czech Republic and Germany.

The wingspan is 9–11.5 mm. Adults are on wing in May and June.

The larvae feed on the buds of Ribes spicatum and Ribes alpinum.
