= Lampronia aeneella =

Scientific classification
- Kingdom: Animalia
- Phylum: Arthropoda
- Clade: Pancrustacea
- Class: Insecta
- Order: Lepidoptera
- Family: Prodoxidae
- Genus: Lampronia
- Species: L. aeneella

Binomial name
- Lampronia aeneella (Heinemann, 1870)

Species of moth

Lampronia aeneella is a moth of the family Prodoxidae. It is found in western Austria.

The wingspan is about 15 mm.
