= Greya powelli =

Scientific classification
- Kingdom: Animalia
- Phylum: Arthropoda
- Clade: Pancrustacea
- Class: Insecta
- Order: Lepidoptera
- Family: Prodoxidae
- Genus: Greya
- Species: G. powelli

Binomial name
- Greya powelli Davis & Pellmyr, 1992

Species of moth

Greya powelli is a moth of the family Prodoxidae. It is found in the coastal range between the San Francisco Bay area and the San Gabriel Mountains, and in the south-central Sierra Nevada of California.

The wingspan is 7–12 mm.

The larvae feed on Bowlesia incana.
