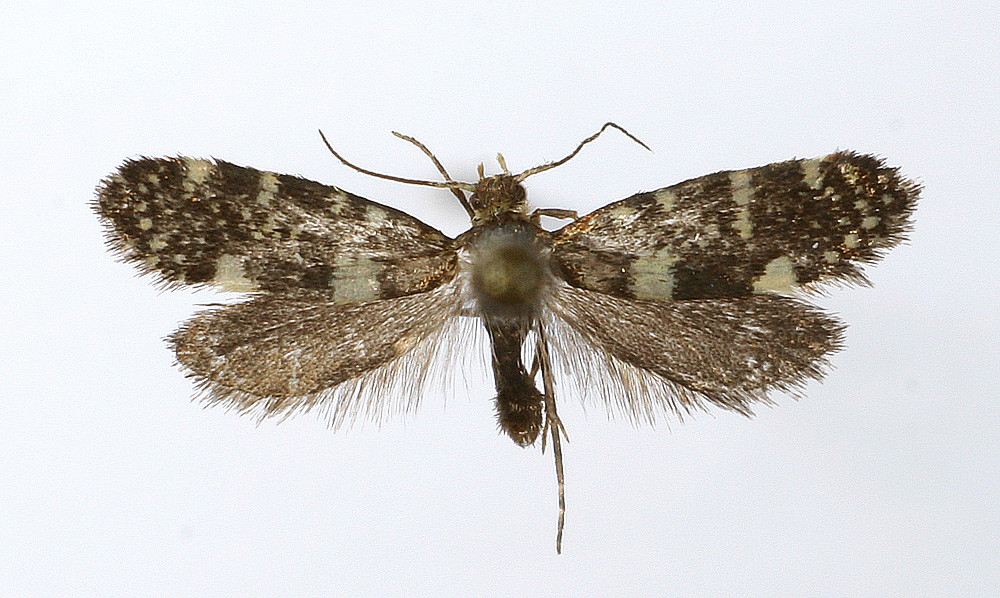

Scientific classification
- Kingdom: Animalia
- Phylum: Arthropoda
- Class: Insecta
- Order: Lepidoptera
- Family: Prodoxidae
- Genus: Lampronia
- Species: L. corticella

Binomial name
- Lampronia corticella (Linnaeus, 1758)

Synonyms
- Phalaena (Tinea) corticella Linnaeus, 1758; Tinea corticella Linnaeus, 1758; Tinea rubiella Bjerkander, 1781; Lampronia rubiella Bjerkander, 1781; Tinea variella (Fabricius, 1794); Lampronia multipunctella Duponchel, 1838

= Lampronia corticella =

Species of moth

Lampronia corticella, the raspberry moth, is a moth of the family Prodoxidae. The species was first described by Carl Linnaeus in his 1758 10th edition of Systema Naturae. It is found in most of Europe, except Iceland, the Iberian Peninsula and the Balkan Peninsula. It is an introduced species in North America, where it was first detected in New Brunswick, Canada, in 1936.

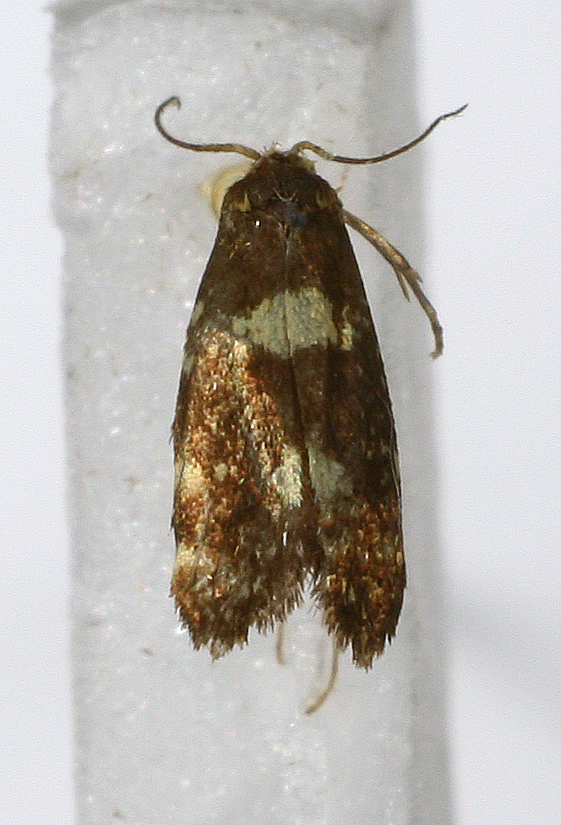

The wingspan is 10–12 mm.9–12 mm. The head is light yellow-ochreous mixed with fuscous. Forewings dark fuscous, with scattered pale yellowish dots. There are four small costal and two larger dorsal pale ochreous-yellowish spots; tips of apical cilia whitish. Hindwings are dark grey. The larvae feed on Rubus species.
