= Greya kononenkoi =

Scientific classification
- Kingdom: Animalia
- Phylum: Arthropoda
- Clade: Pancrustacea
- Class: Insecta
- Order: Lepidoptera
- Family: Prodoxidae
- Genus: Greya
- Species: G. kononenkoi

Binomial name
- Greya kononenkoi Kozlov, 1996

Species of moth

Greya kononenkoi is a moth of the family Prodoxidae. It is found in low-shrub tundra on the Chukchi Peninsula in eastern Siberia.

The wingspan is 14–15 mm (0.55–0.59 in).
