= Greya subalba =

Scientific classification
- Kingdom: Animalia
- Phylum: Arthropoda
- Clade: Pancrustacea
- Class: Insecta
- Order: Lepidoptera
- Family: Prodoxidae
- Genus: Greya
- Species: G. subalba

Binomial name
- Greya subalba Braun, 1921

Species of moth

Greya subalba is a moth of the family Prodoxidae. In North America, it is found in southern British Columbia, Alberta, Washington, Oregon, northern Idaho, western Montana and south to south-western Oregon. The habitat consists of dry, forb-rich steppe.

The wingspan is 11–16 mm.

The larvae feed on Lomatium species. Young larvae feed on the developing seeds of their host plant.
