= Lampronia sakhalinella =

Scientific classification
- Kingdom: Animalia
- Phylum: Arthropoda
- Clade: Pancrustacea
- Class: Insecta
- Order: Lepidoptera
- Family: Prodoxidae
- Genus: Lampronia
- Species: L. sakhalinella

Binomial name
- Lampronia sakhalinella Kozlov, 1996

Species of moth

Lampronia sakhalinella is a moth of the family Prodoxidae. It is found on the Sakhalin island in Russia.
