= Greya variata =

Scientific classification
- Kingdom: Animalia
- Phylum: Arthropoda
- Clade: Pancrustacea
- Class: Insecta
- Order: Lepidoptera
- Family: Prodoxidae
- Genus: Greya
- Species: G. variata

Binomial name
- Greya variata (Braun, 1921)

Synonyms
- Lampronia variata Braun, 1921

Species of moth

Greya variata is a moth of the family Prodoxidae. It is found in herb-rich meadows and along forest edges in the central Rocky Mountains at the border between the United States and Canada.

The wingspan is 11–13 mm. The forewings have a dark brown base and two pale tan-coloured patches. The hindwings are slightly lighter and have no pattern.

The larvae possibly feed on Osmorhiza occidentalis.
