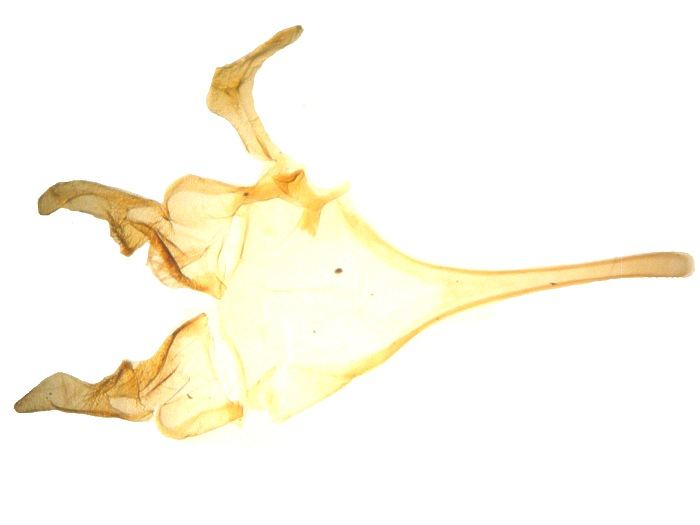
- Lampronia provectella male genitalia

Scientific classification
- Kingdom: Animalia
- Phylum: Arthropoda
- Clade: Pancrustacea
- Class: Insecta
- Order: Lepidoptera
- Family: Prodoxidae
- Genus: Lampronia
- Species: L. provectella

Binomial name
- Lampronia provectella (Heyden, 1865)

Synonyms
- Incurvaria provectella Heyden, 1865; Lampronia triangulifera Tengstrom, 1869

= Lampronia provectella =

Species of moth

Lampronia provectella is a moth of the family Prodoxidae. It is found in France, Germany, Switzerland, Austria, Poland, the Czech Republic, Slovakia and Romania. It is also present in Russia east to the Altai Mountains.

The wingspan is 16–19 mm.

The larvae feed on the buds of Rosa species, including Rosa pendulina. Pupation takes place between the shoots of the host plant.
