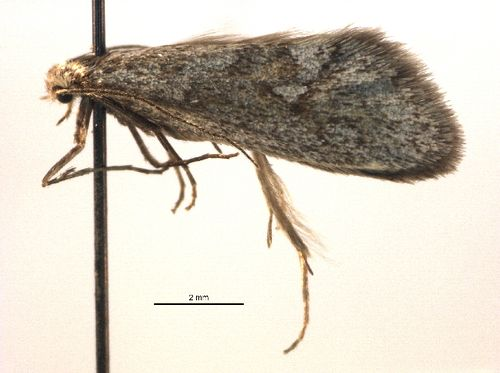

Scientific classification
- Kingdom: Animalia
- Phylum: Arthropoda
- Clade: Pancrustacea
- Class: Insecta
- Order: Lepidoptera
- Family: Prodoxidae
- Genus: Greya
- Species: G. solenobiella

Binomial name
- Greya solenobiella (Walsingham, 1880)

Synonyms
- Incurvaria solenobiella Walsingham, 1880

= Greya solenobiella =

Species of moth

Greya solenobiella is a moth of the family Prodoxidae. In the United States it is found from south-western Oregon south to California, where it is found along the coast and in the Sierra Nevada.

The wingspan is 9.5–14.5 mm (0.37–0.57 in).

The larvae feed on Yabea microcarpa. Young larvae feed on the developing seeds of their host plant.
