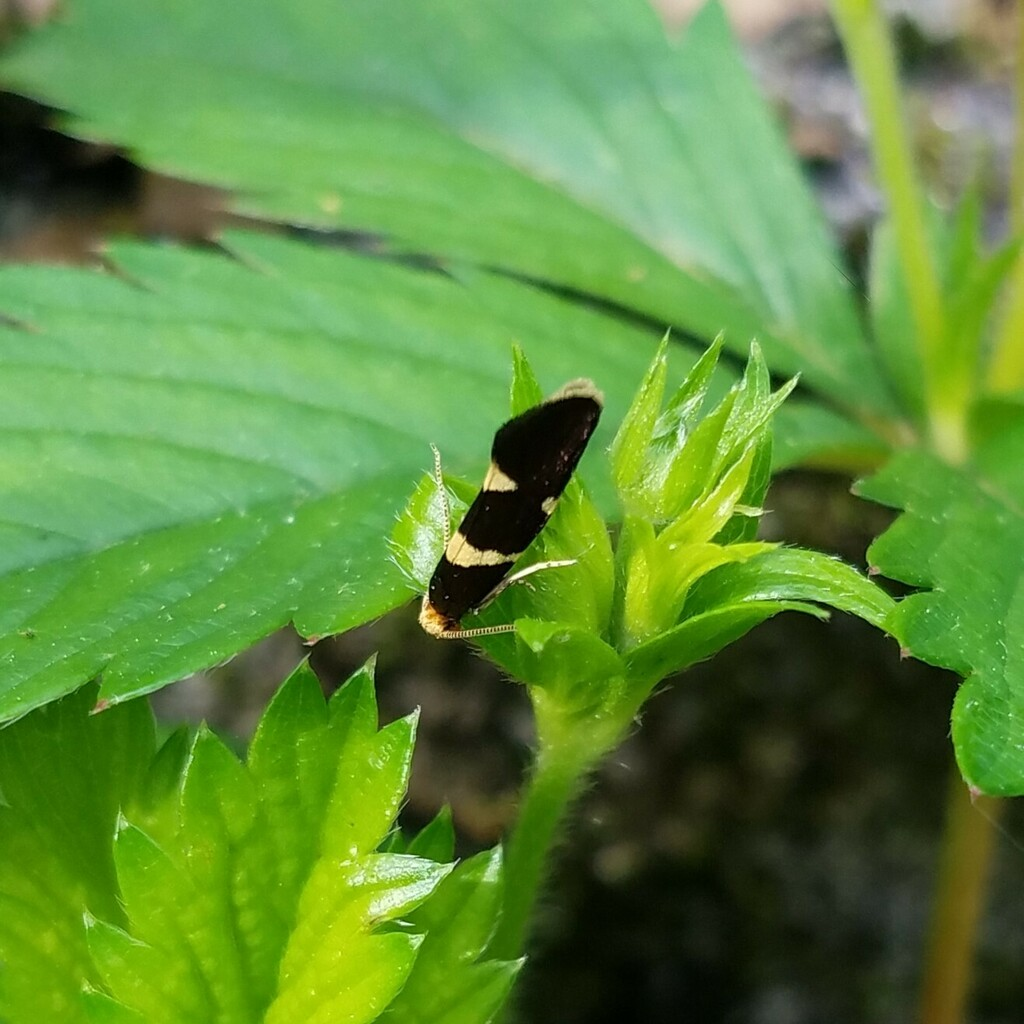

Scientific classification
- Kingdom: Animalia
- Phylum: Arthropoda
- Clade: Pancrustacea
- Class: Insecta
- Order: Lepidoptera
- Family: Prodoxidae
- Genus: Lampronia
- Species: L. russatella

Binomial name
- Lampronia russatella (Clemens, 1860)

Synonyms
- Incurvaria russatella Clemens, 1860; Lampronia tripunctella Walsingham, 1880

= Lampronia russatella =

Species of moth

Lampronia russatella is a moth of the family Prodoxidae. It is found in mesic forests in eastern North America.

The wingspan is about 12 mm. Adults are on wing from May to July.
