= Host sanction theory =

Ecological theory regarding mutualisms

The host sanction (HS) theory aims to understand how cooperation evolves and is maintained in a mutualistic relationship between organisms. The host sanction model theorizes that the host organism of a mutualism is able to decrease the fitness of the other organism to prevent cheating.

The basis of the host sanction (HS) theory was first introduced by J.J. Bull and W.R. Rice in 1991 as the partner-choice model. The partner-choice model was proposed as a mechanism in which one organism is capable of rewarding or punishing the other organism based on its cooperation. Bull and Rice hypothesized the partner-choice model is evident in both fig tree-fig wasp and yucca-yucca moth (Parategeticula or Tegeticula) mutualisms. Further studies conclude these mutualisms align with the host sanction (HS) model given they both involve a host organism implementing sanctions on their symbiotic partners. The fig tree-fig wasp mutualism was observed by Axelrod and Hamilton in 1981. In this mutualism, the fig tree receives pollination from the fig wasps, and the fig wasps oviposit eggs into figs. This relationship represents a host sanction mechanism due to the fig tree's ability to prevent the fig wasp from ovipositing too many eggs by selectively aborting figs with too many wasp eggs. The yucca -yucca moth mutualism is similar; the oviposition of yucca moth eggs allows yucca pollination. The yucca plant is capable of enforcing sanctions on the moths by withholding nectar to prevent cheating. In both these situations, the yucca plant and fig tree are hosts to the insects and they administer sanctions to the insects. Host sanctions are commonly accepted as a mechanism that allows mutualisms to exist through evolving cooperation between organisms.
