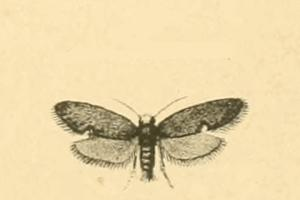

Scientific classification
- Kingdom: Animalia
- Phylum: Arthropoda
- Clade: Pancrustacea
- Class: Insecta
- Order: Lepidoptera
- Family: Prodoxidae
- Genus: Lampronia
- Species: L. aeripennella

Binomial name
- Lampronia aeripennella (Rebel, 1889)

Synonyms
- Incurvaria aeripennella Rebel, 1889

= Lampronia aeripennella =

Species of moth

Lampronia aeripennella is a moth of the family Prodoxidae. It is found in Sweden, Finland, France, Austria, Italy and Romania.

The wingspan is 13–19 mm. Adults are on wing in July.

The larvae feed in the bark of Pyrus communis and related species.
