= Lampronia quinquepunctata =

Scientific classification
- Kingdom: Animalia
- Phylum: Arthropoda
- Class: Insecta
- Order: Lepidoptera
- Family: Prodoxidae
- Genus: Lampronia
- Species: L. quinquepunctata

Binomial name
- Lampronia quinquepunctata Nielsen, 1982

Species of moth

Lampronia quinquepunctata is a moth of the family Incurvariidae. It is known from Nepal.

== Description ==
The wingspan is about 14 mm.
