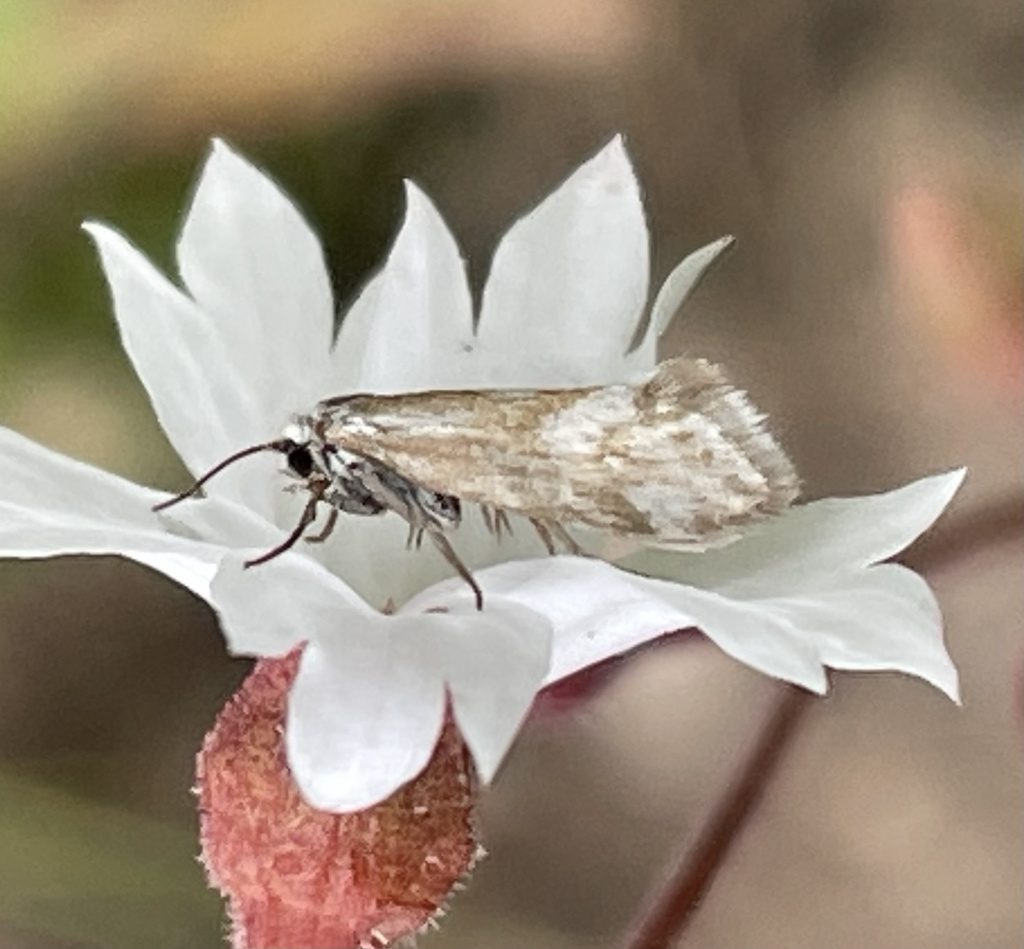

Scientific classification
- Kingdom: Animalia
- Phylum: Arthropoda
- Clade: Pancrustacea
- Class: Insecta
- Order: Lepidoptera
- Family: Prodoxidae
- Genus: Greya
- Species: G. obscura

Binomial name
- Greya obscura Davis & Pellmyr, 1992

= Greya obscura =

Species of moth

Greya obscura is a moth of the family Prodoxidae. It is found from south-western Oregon to the San Garbriel Mountains and the southern Sierra Nevada of California. The habitat consists of grassy portions of open oak woodland.

Their wingspan is 10.5–19 mm.

The larvae feed on Lithophragma species. The larvae are thought to be leaf miners.
