= Parategeticula elephantipella =

Scientific classification
- Kingdom: Animalia
- Phylum: Arthropoda
- Clade: Pancrustacea
- Class: Insecta
- Order: Lepidoptera
- Family: Prodoxidae
- Genus: Parategeticula
- Species: P. elephantipella

Binomial name
- Parategeticula elephantipella Pellmyr & Balcazar-Lara, 2000

Species of moth

Parategeticula elephantipella is a moth of the family Prodoxidae. It is found on the eastern slopes of the Sierra Madre Oriental in Veracruz, Mexico.

The wingspan is 21–23 mm for males and 20.5-26.5 mm for females.

The larvae feed on Yucca elephantipes.
