= Greya sparsipunctella =

Scientific classification
- Kingdom: Animalia
- Phylum: Arthropoda
- Clade: Pancrustacea
- Class: Insecta
- Order: Lepidoptera
- Family: Prodoxidae
- Genus: Greya
- Species: G. sparsipunctella

Binomial name
- Greya sparsipunctella (Walsingham, 1907)

Synonyms
- Tinea sparsipunctella Walsingham, 1907

Species of moth

Greya sparsipunctella is a moth of the family Prodoxidae. It is found along the northern California coast of the United States. The habitat consists of low, forb-rich ocean cliff vegetation and moist coniferous forest.

The wingspan is 23–27 mm, making it the largest Greya species.
