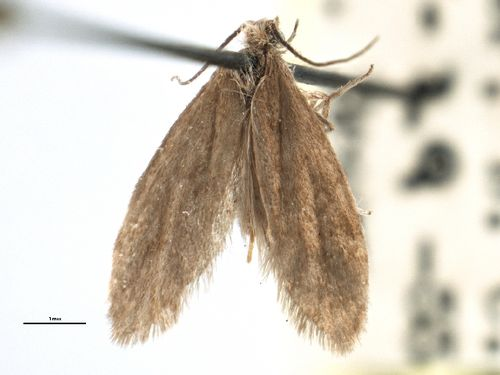

Scientific classification
- Kingdom: Animalia
- Phylum: Arthropoda
- Clade: Pancrustacea
- Class: Insecta
- Order: Lepidoptera
- Family: Prodoxidae
- Genus: Lampronia
- Species: L. humilis

Binomial name
- Lampronia humilis (Walsingham, 1888)

Synonyms
- Incurvaria humilis Walsingham, 1888; Lampronia (Tanysaccus) humilis

= Lampronia humilis =

Species of moth

Lampronia humilis is a moth of the family Prodoxidae. In North America it is found in the coastal areas of British Columbia south to northern California.

The wingspan is 10–14 mm. The forewings and hindwings are unicolorous grayish brown.
