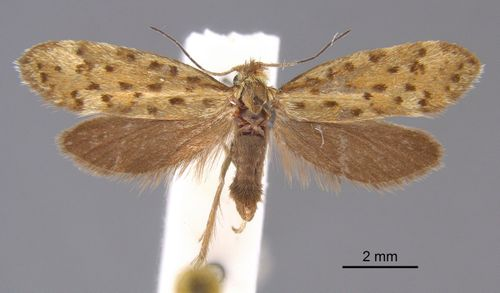

Scientific classification
- Kingdom: Animalia
- Phylum: Arthropoda
- Clade: Pancrustacea
- Class: Insecta
- Order: Lepidoptera
- Family: Prodoxidae
- Genus: Greya
- Species: G. mitellae

Binomial name
- Greya mitellae Davis & Pellmyr, 1992

= Greya mitellae =

Species of moth

Greya mitellae is a moth of the family Prodoxidae. It is found in moist coniferous or mixed coniferous forests in north-western Idaho and the Blue Mountains of south-eastern Washington.

The wingspan is 10–15 mm. Adults are sexually dimorphic.

The larvae feed on Mitella stauropetala. The larvae are thought to be leaf miners.
