= Greya variabilis =

Scientific classification
- Kingdom: Animalia
- Phylum: Arthropoda
- Clade: Pancrustacea
- Class: Insecta
- Order: Lepidoptera
- Family: Prodoxidae
- Genus: Greya
- Species: G. variabilis

Binomial name
- Greya variabilis Davis & Pellmyr, 1992

Species of moth

Greya variabilis is a moth of the family Prodoxidae. It is found on the Yugorski, Taymyr and Chukchi peninsulas of arctic Russia, the Pribilof Islands, Alaska and along the North American west coast. In the northern part of the range, the habitat consists of tundra. In the south, it occurs in moist coniferous forests.

The wingspan is 12–18 mm.

The larvae possibly feed on Saxifraga species.
