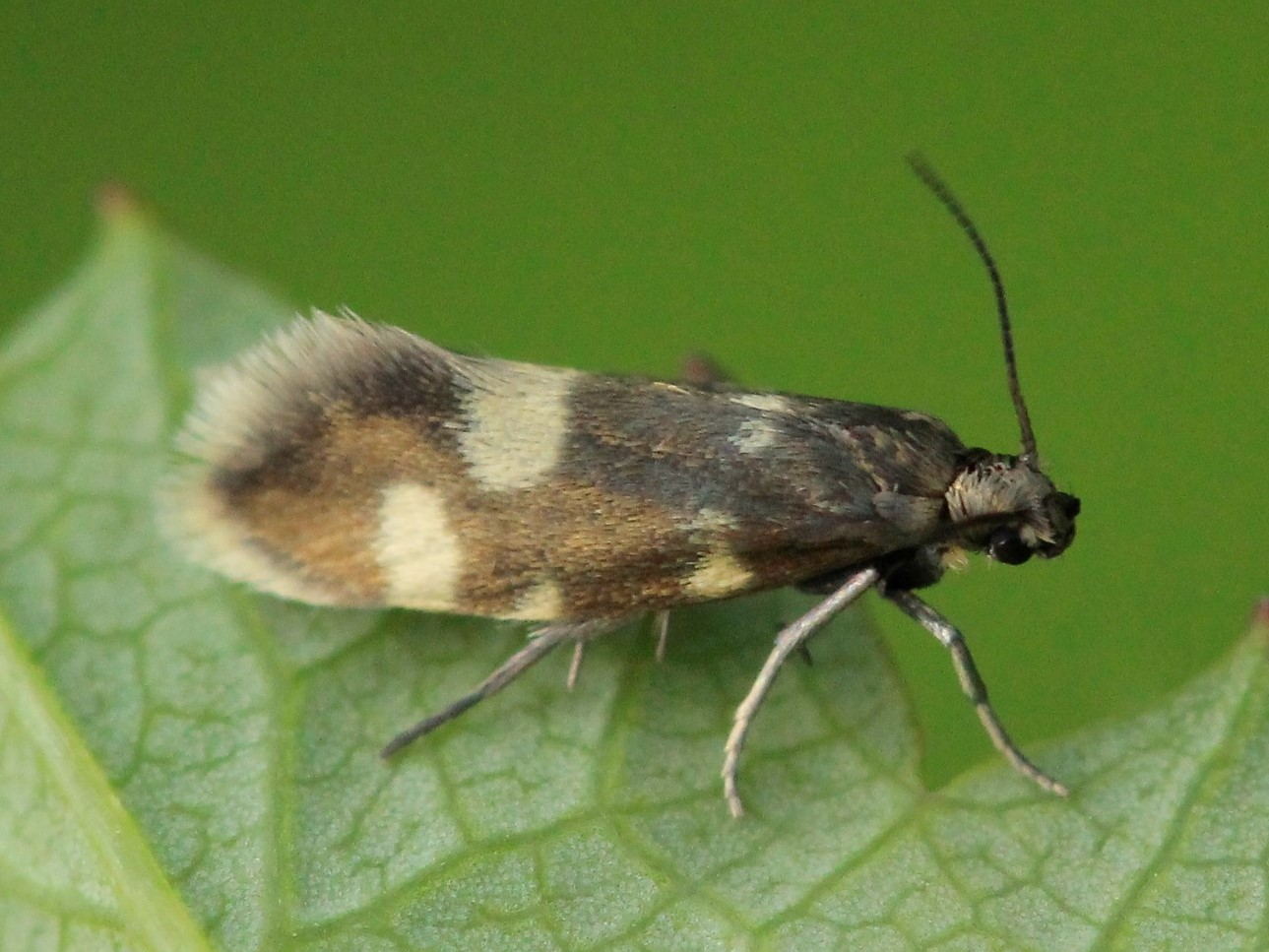

Scientific classification
- Kingdom: Animalia
- Phylum: Arthropoda
- Clade: Pancrustacea
- Class: Insecta
- Order: Lepidoptera
- Family: Prodoxidae
- Genus: Lampronia
- Species: L. altaica

Binomial name
- Lampronia altaica Zagulajev, 1992

= Lampronia altaica =

Species of moth

Lampronia altaica is a species of moth in the family Prodoxidae. It is found in the Altai Mountains of central Asia, the Ryanggang Province of North Korea and in Japan.

The wingspan is 10.5-11.5 mm for males and about 9 mm for females.
