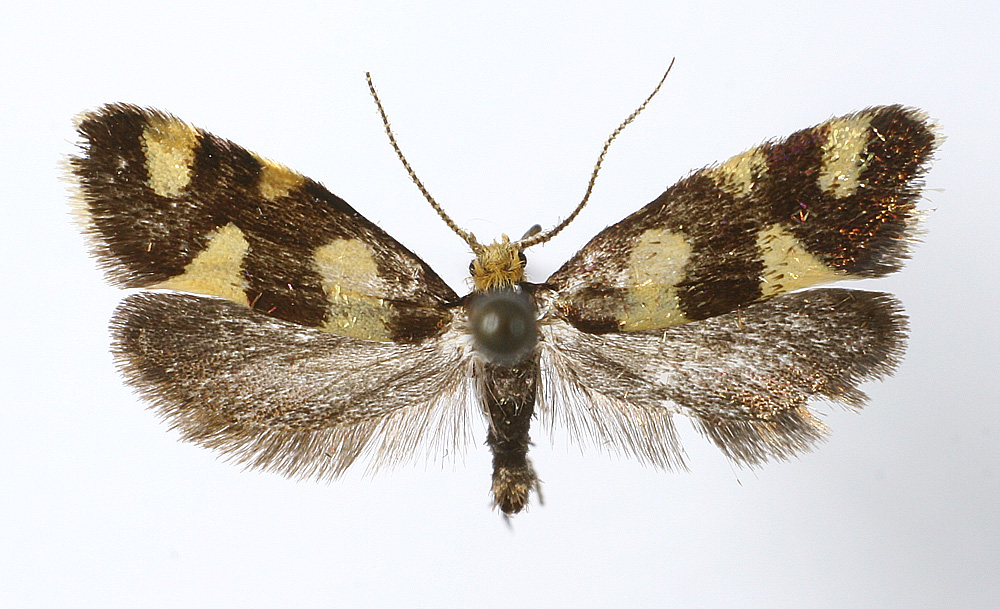

Scientific classification
- Domain: Eukaryota
- Kingdom: Animalia
- Phylum: Arthropoda
- Class: Insecta
- Order: Lepidoptera
- Family: Prodoxidae
- Genus: Lampronia
- Species: L. rupella

Binomial name
- Lampronia rupella (Denis & Schiffermüller, 1775)

Synonyms
- Tinea rupella Denis & Schiffermüller, 1775; Tortrix naezeniana Thunberg, 1797

= Lampronia rupella =

Species of moth

Lampronia rupella is a moth of the family Prodoxidae. It is found in most of Europe, with the exception of Iceland, Ireland, Great Britain, the Benelux, the Iberian Peninsula, Croatia and Slovenia.

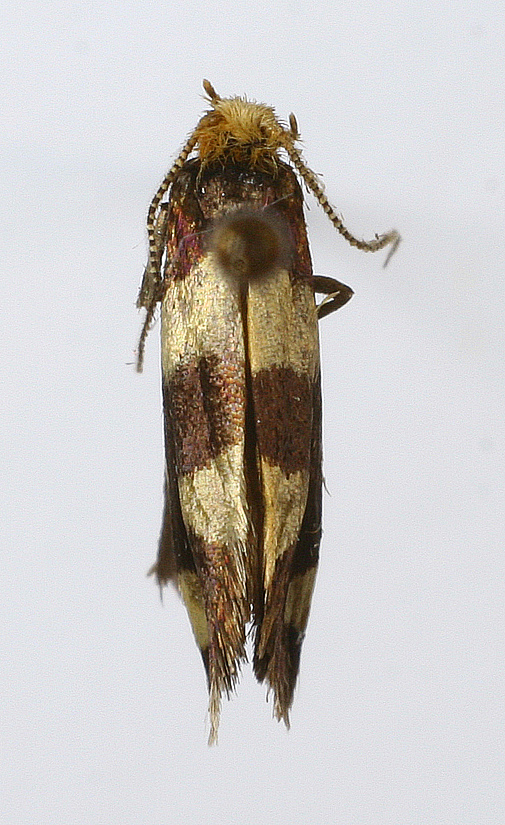

The wingspan is 13–16 mm.

The larvae feed on Asteraceae species.
