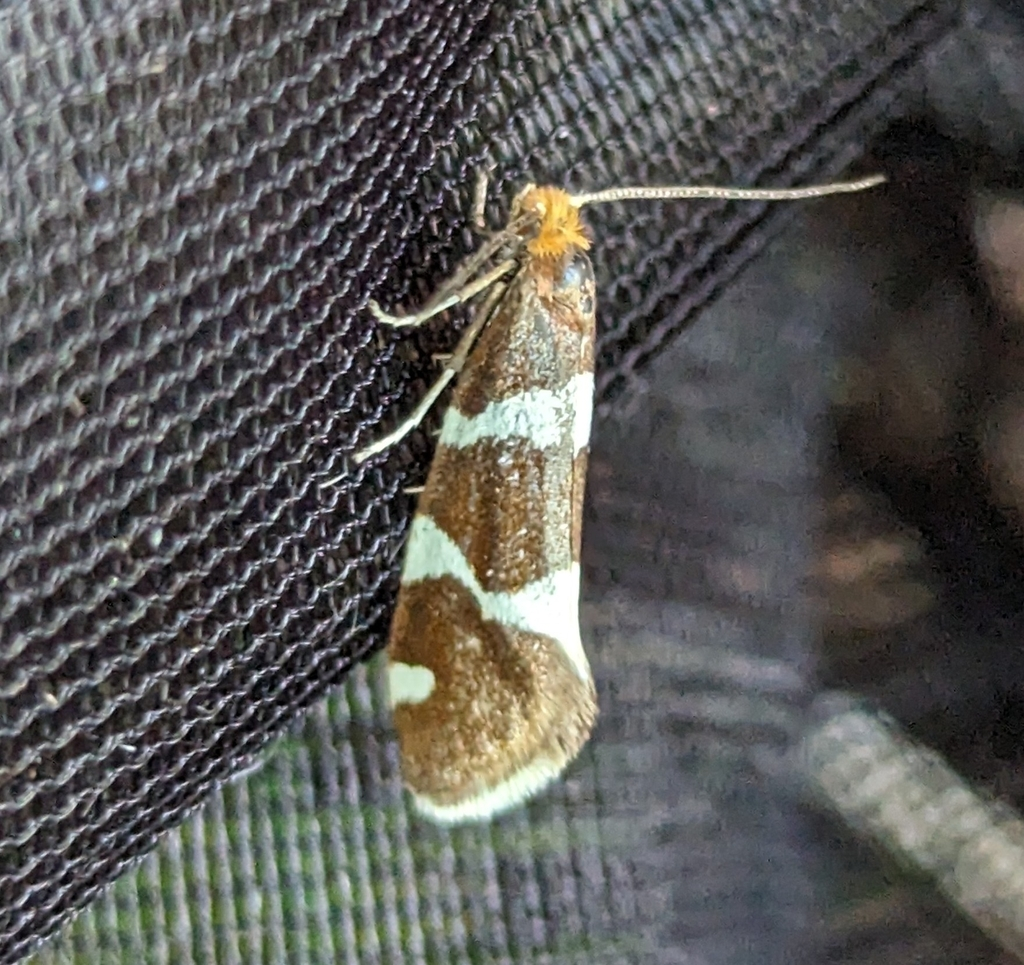

Scientific classification
- Kingdom: Animalia
- Phylum: Arthropoda
- Clade: Pancrustacea
- Class: Insecta
- Order: Lepidoptera
- Family: Prodoxidae
- Genus: Lampronia
- Species: L. oregonella

Binomial name
- Lampronia oregonella Walsingham, 1880

Synonyms
- Incurvaria gilletella Busck, 1915

= Lampronia oregonella =

Species of moth

Lampronia oregonella is a moth of the family Prodoxidae. In North America it is found in British Columbia, Washington, Oregon and Colorado.

The larvae feed on Heuchera species.
