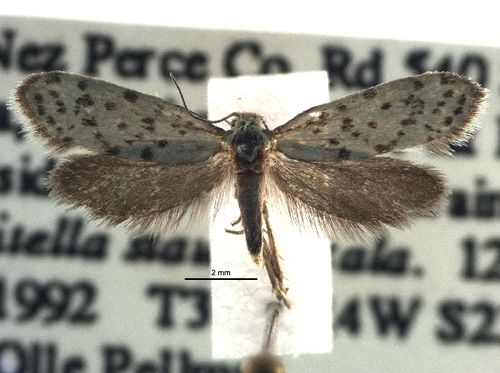

Scientific classification
- Kingdom: Animalia
- Phylum: Arthropoda
- Clade: Pancrustacea
- Class: Insecta
- Order: Lepidoptera
- Family: Prodoxidae
- Genus: Greya
- Species: G. obscuromaculata

Binomial name
- Greya obscuromaculata (Braun, 1921)

Synonyms
- Lampronia obscuromaculata Braun, 1921; Greya augustella Blackmore, 1926

= Greya obscuromaculata =

Species of moth

Greya obscuromaculata is a moth of the family Prodoxidae. In North America it is found in southern British Columbia, Alberta, Washington, Idaho and Montana. The habitat consists of moist coniferous forests.

The wingspan is 13–17 mm.

The larvae possibly feed on Osmorhiza chilensis and/or Tiarella trifoliata.
