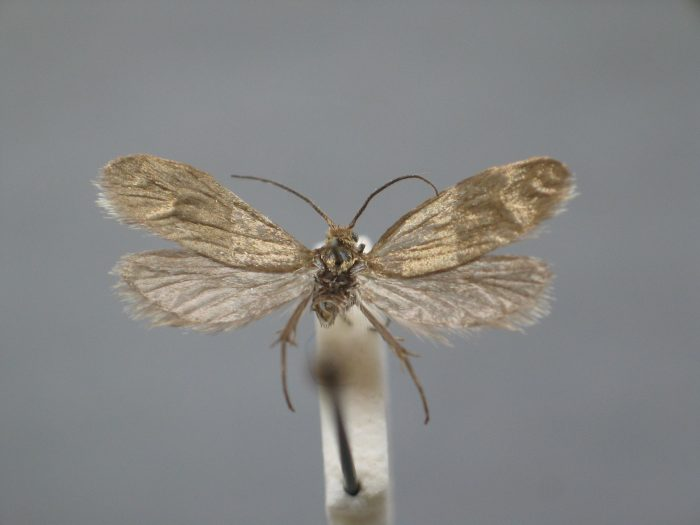

Scientific classification
- Kingdom: Animalia
- Phylum: Arthropoda
- Clade: Pancrustacea
- Class: Insecta
- Order: Lepidoptera
- Family: Prodoxidae
- Genus: Lampronia
- Species: L. splendidella

Binomial name
- Lampronia splendidella (Heinemann, 1870)

Synonyms
- Incurvaria splendidella Heinemann, 1870

= Lampronia splendidella =

Species of moth

Lampronia splendidella is a moth of the family Prodoxidae. It is found in Germany, Poland, Slovakia, Austria and Switzerland. In the east, the range extends to the Altai Mountains.

The wingspan is 12–15 mm. Adults are on wing in May and June.
