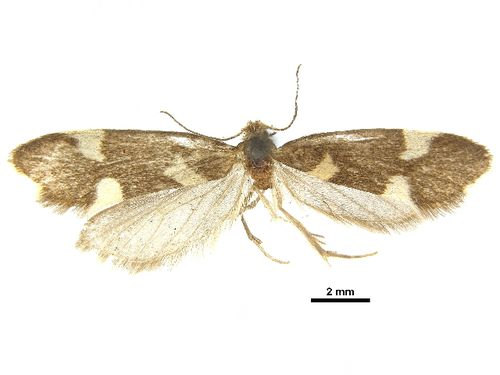

Scientific classification
- Kingdom: Animalia
- Phylum: Arthropoda
- Clade: Pancrustacea
- Class: Insecta
- Order: Lepidoptera
- Family: Prodoxidae
- Genus: Lampronia
- Species: L. taylorella

Binomial name
- Lampronia taylorella (Kearfott, 1907)

Synonyms
- Incurvaria taylorella Kearfott, 1907; Lampronia quieta Braun, 1921

= Lampronia taylorella =

Species of moth

Lampronia taylorella is a moth of the family Prodoxidae. In North America it is found along the coast of British Columbia and in Washington and Montana.

The wingspan is about 18 mm.
