= Greya marginimaculata =

Scientific classification
- Kingdom: Animalia
- Phylum: Arthropoda
- Clade: Pancrustacea
- Class: Insecta
- Order: Lepidoptera
- Family: Prodoxidae
- Genus: Greya
- Species: G. marginimaculata

Binomial name
- Greya marginimaculata (Issiki, 1957)

Synonyms
- Lampronia marginimaculata Issiki, 1957

Species of moth

Greya marginimaculata is a moth of the family Prodoxidae. It is found in Japan on the main island of Honshu and possibly the Russian Far East.

The wingspan is 14–16 mm.
