= Lampronia novempunctata =

Scientific classification
- Kingdom: Animalia
- Phylum: Arthropoda
- Class: Insecta
- Order: Lepidoptera
- Superfamily: Adeloidea
- Family: Prodoxidae
- Genus: Lampronia
- Species: L. novempunctata

Binomial name
- Lampronia novempunctata Nielsen, 1982

Species of moth

Lampronia novempunctata is a moth of the family Incurvariidae. It is known from Nepal.

The wingspan is about 12 mm.
