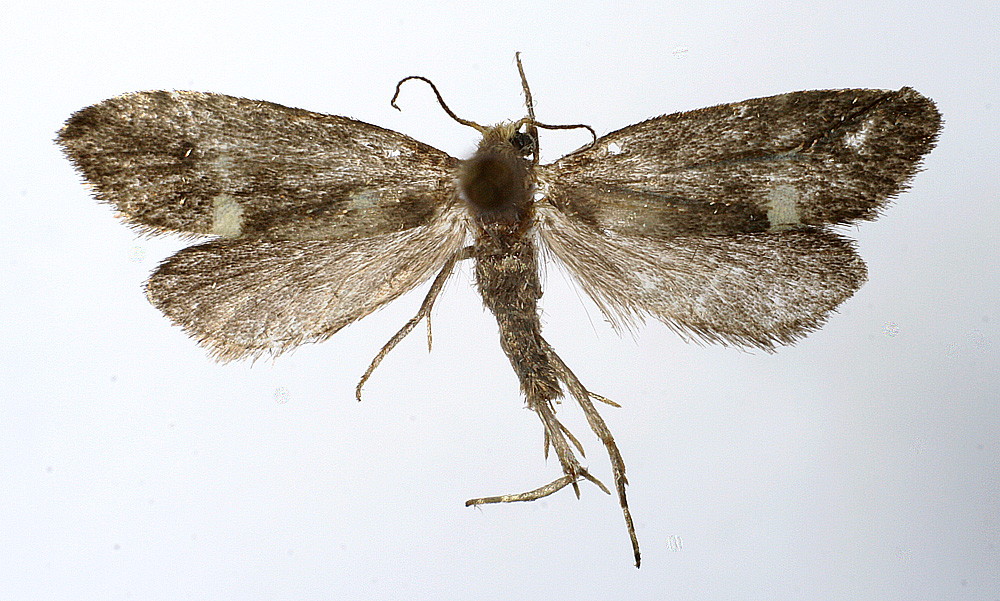

Scientific classification
- Kingdom: Animalia
- Phylum: Arthropoda
- Clade: Pancrustacea
- Class: Insecta
- Order: Lepidoptera
- Family: Prodoxidae
- Genus: Lampronia
- Species: L. flavimitrella

Binomial name
- Lampronia flavimitrella (Hübner, 1817)

Synonyms
- Tinea flavimitrella Hübner, 1817

= Lampronia flavimitrella =

Species of moth

Lampronia flavimitrella is a moth of the family Prodoxidae. It is found in most of Europe, with the exception of Iceland, Ireland, the Iberian Peninsula and most of the Balkan Peninsula.

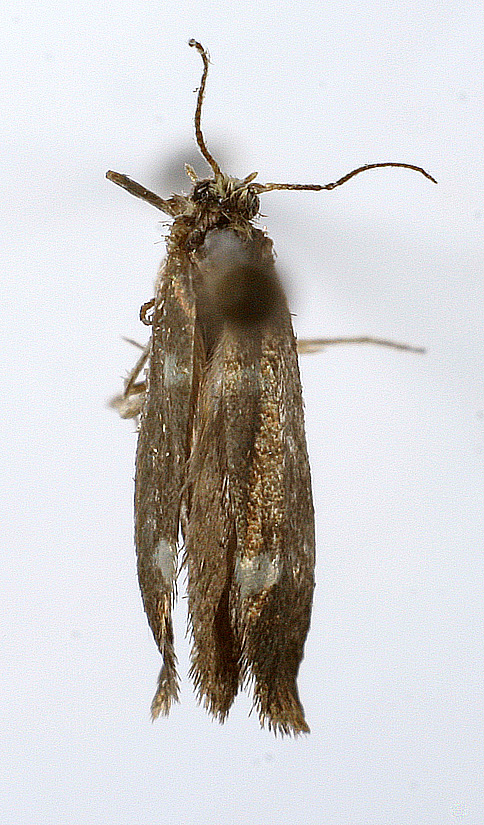

The wingspan is 13–15 mm. Adults are on wing from May to June and are active in the afternoon sunshine.

The larvae probably feed on Rubus idaeus and Rubus caesius.
