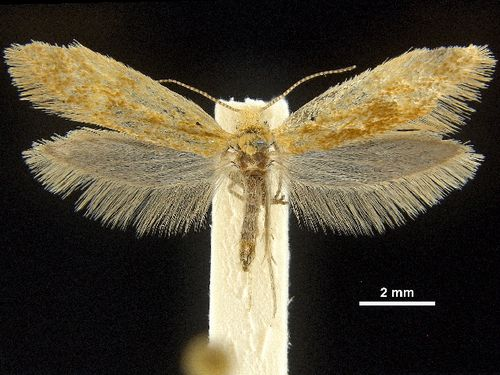

Scientific classification
- Kingdom: Animalia
- Phylum: Arthropoda
- Clade: Pancrustacea
- Class: Insecta
- Order: Lepidoptera
- Family: Prodoxidae
- Genus: Lampronia
- Species: L. aenescens

Binomial name
- Lampronia aenescens (Walsingham, 1888)

Synonyms
- Incurvaria aenescens Walsingham, 1888; Lampronia; (Tanysaccus) aenescens

= Lampronia aenescens =

Species of moth

Lampronia aenescens is a moth of the family Prodoxidae first described by Thomas de Grey, 6th Baron Walsingham, in 1888. In North America it is found in Alberta and ranges west and south through southern British Columbia to northern California and Colorado.

The wingspan is 10.5–13.5 mm. Adults are on wing in June.

The larvae feed on Rosa woodsii.
