= Lampronia intermediella =

Scientific classification
- Kingdom: Animalia
- Phylum: Arthropoda
- Clade: Pancrustacea
- Class: Insecta
- Order: Lepidoptera
- Family: Prodoxidae
- Genus: Lampronia
- Species: L. intermediella

Binomial name
- Lampronia intermediella (Heinemann, 1870)

Synonyms
- Incurvaria intermediella Heinemann, 1870

Species of moth

Lampronia intermediella is a moth of the family Prodoxidae. It is found in Slovakia and Romania.

The wingspan is about 16.5 mm.

The larvae feed on Corylus species. They initially mine the leaves of their host plant.
