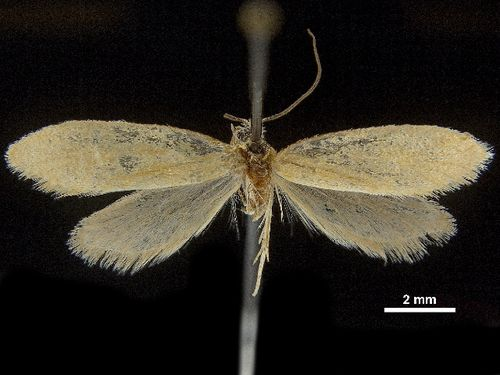

Scientific classification
- Kingdom: Animalia
- Phylum: Arthropoda
- Clade: Pancrustacea
- Class: Insecta
- Order: Lepidoptera
- Family: Prodoxidae
- Genus: Lampronia
- Species: L. sublustris

Binomial name
- Lampronia sublustris Braun, 1925

Synonyms
- Lampronia (Tanysaccus) sublustris

= Lampronia sublustris =

Species of moth

Lampronia sublustris is a moth of the family Prodoxidae first described by Annette Frances Braun in 1925. In North America it is found from southern British Columbia south to northern California and east to Alberta, Utah and Colorado.

The wingspan is 12–16 mm. Adults are on wing in June.

The larvae probably feed on Rosa woodsii.
