= Lampronia stangei =

Scientific classification
- Kingdom: Animalia
- Phylum: Arthropoda
- Clade: Pancrustacea
- Class: Insecta
- Order: Lepidoptera
- Family: Prodoxidae
- Genus: Lampronia
- Species: L. stangei

Binomial name
- Lampronia stangei Rebel, 1903

Species of moth

Lampronia stangei is a moth of the family Prodoxidae. It is found in Italy.
