= Parategeticula ecdysiastica =

Scientific classification
- Kingdom: Animalia
- Phylum: Arthropoda
- Clade: Pancrustacea
- Class: Insecta
- Order: Lepidoptera
- Family: Prodoxidae
- Genus: Parategeticula
- Species: P. ecdysiastica

Binomial name
- Parategeticula ecdysiastica Pellmyr & Balcázar-Lara, 2008

Species of moth

Parategeticula ecdysiastica is a moth of the family Prodoxidae. It is found in the Sierra de la Laguna Mountains of the Cape region of Baja California, Mexico

The wingspan is about 25 mm. Adults are possibly on wing in July.
