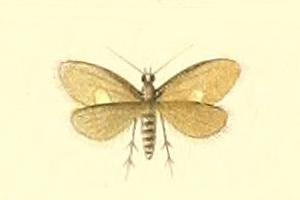

Scientific classification
- Kingdom: Animalia
- Phylum: Arthropoda
- Clade: Pancrustacea
- Class: Insecta
- Order: Lepidoptera
- Family: Prodoxidae
- Genus: Lampronia
- Species: L. psychidella

Binomial name
- Lampronia psychidella (Milliere, 1854)

Synonyms
- Incurvaria psychidella Milliere, 1854

= Lampronia psychidella =

Species of moth

Lampronia psychidella is a moth of the family Prodoxidae. It is found in France.
