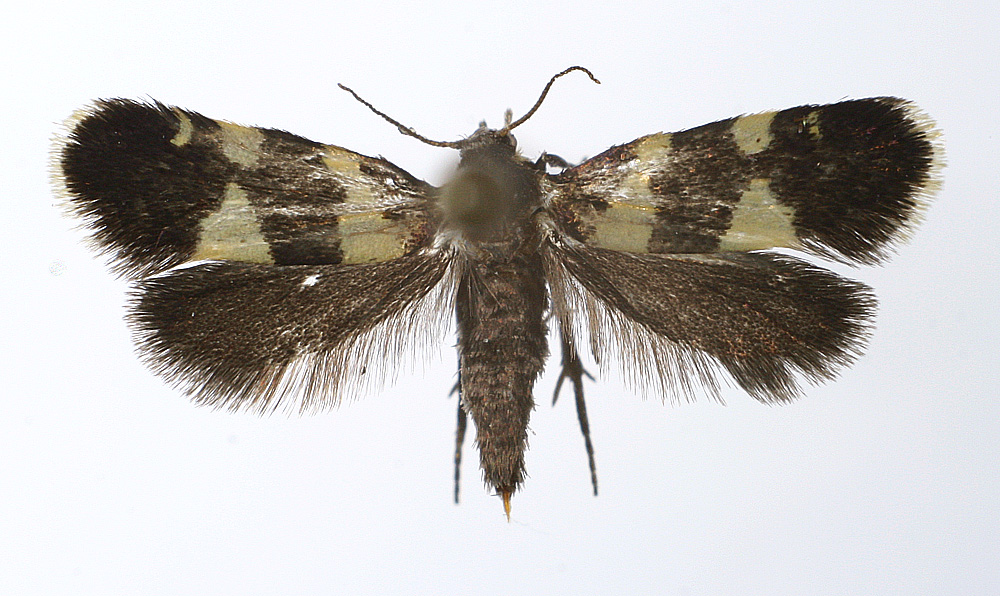

Scientific classification
- Kingdom: Animalia
- Phylum: Arthropoda
- Class: Insecta
- Order: Lepidoptera
- Family: Prodoxidae
- Genus: Lampronia
- Species: L. luzella

Binomial name
- Lampronia luzella (Hübner, 1817)

Synonyms
- Tinea luzella Hubner, 1817

= Lampronia luzella =

Species of moth

Lampronia luzella is a moth of the family Prodoxidae. It is found in Ireland, Great Britain, the Benelux, France, central Europe, Italy, Fennoscandia, the Baltic region, Russia, Poland, the Czech Republic and Romania.

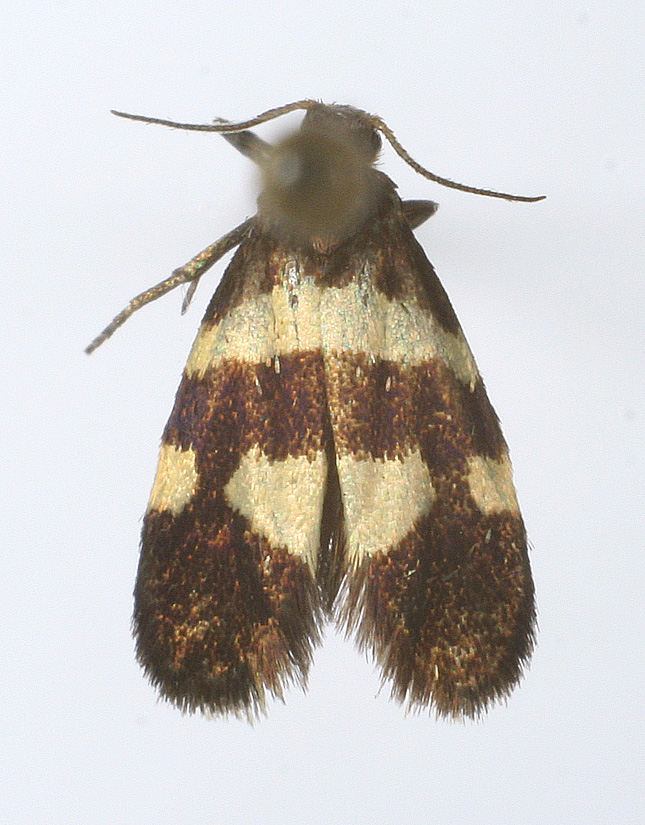

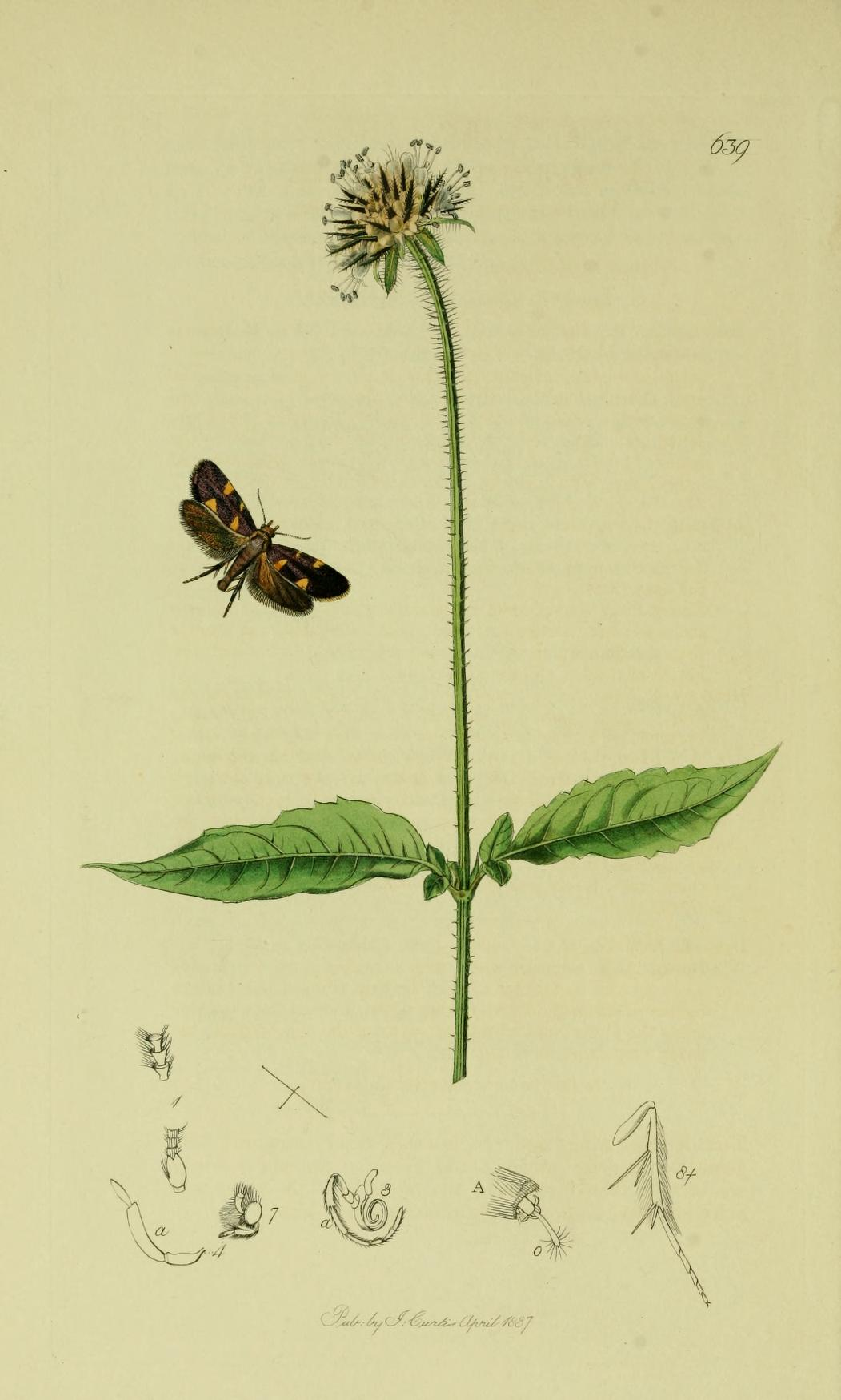
Illustration from John Curtis's British Entomology Volume 6

The wingspan is about 12 mm. The head is fuscous. Forewings dark purple-fuscous; a sometimes interrupted fascia about 1/4, a subquadrate costal spot beyond middle, and a larger triangular dorsal spot before tornus yellow; tips of apical cilia whitish. Hindwings dark fuscous. Adults are on wing from May to July and fly in afternoon sunshine.

The larvae probably feed on Rubus species.
