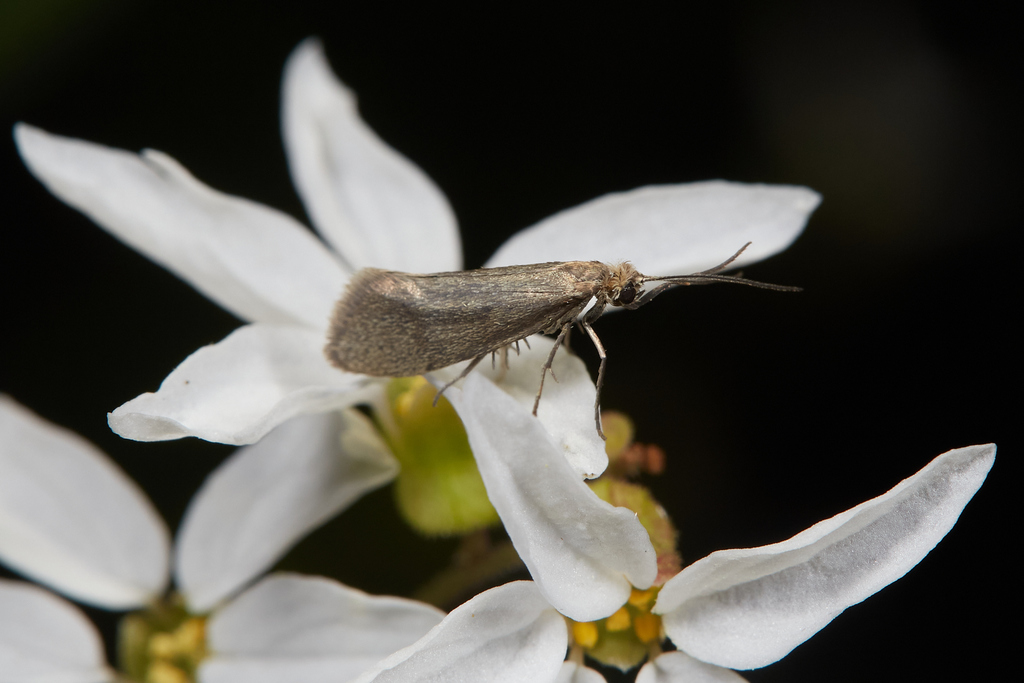

Scientific classification
- Kingdom: Animalia
- Phylum: Arthropoda
- Clade: Pancrustacea
- Class: Insecta
- Order: Lepidoptera
- Family: Prodoxidae
- Genus: Greya
- Species: G. politella

Binomial name
- Greya politella (Walsingham, 1888)

Synonyms
- Incurvaria politella Walsingham, 1888

= Greya politella =

Species of moth

Greya politella is a moth of the family Prodoxidae. It is found from southern British Columbia to the Channel Islands of California and the southern Sierra Nevada, and from the Pacific coast to eastern Idaho and south-western Colorado.

The larvae feed on Saxifragaceae species, including Lithophragma, Heuchera grossulariifolia, Heuchera micrantha and Heuchera saxicola.
