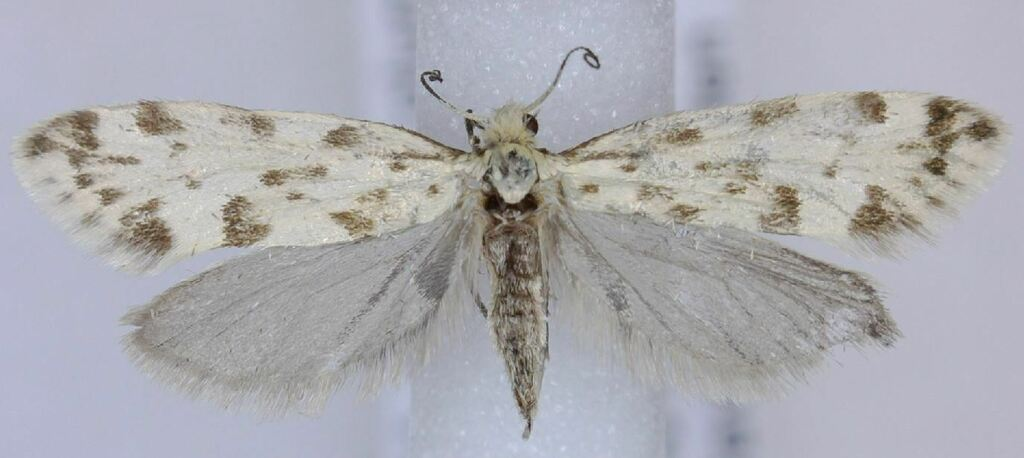

Scientific classification
- Kingdom: Animalia
- Phylum: Arthropoda
- Clade: Pancrustacea
- Class: Insecta
- Order: Lepidoptera
- Family: Prodoxidae
- Genus: Greya
- Species: G. punctiferella

Binomial name
- Greya punctiferella (Walsingham, 1888)

Synonyms
- Incurvaria punctiferella Walsingham, 1888; Greya speculella Blackmore, 1926

= Greya punctiferella =

Species of moth

Greya punctiferella is a moth of the family Prodoxidae. It is found in the Pacific coastal ranges, the western slopes of the Cascades and in parts of the Sierra Nevada from south-eastern Alaska in the north to the Mendocino region of northern California in the south. The habitat consists of moist, coniferous or mixed conifer-Alnus forests.

The wingspan is 12.5–19 mm.

The larvae feed on Tiarella trifoliata, Tolmiea menziesii and Tellima grandiflora. The larvae are thought to be leaf miners.
