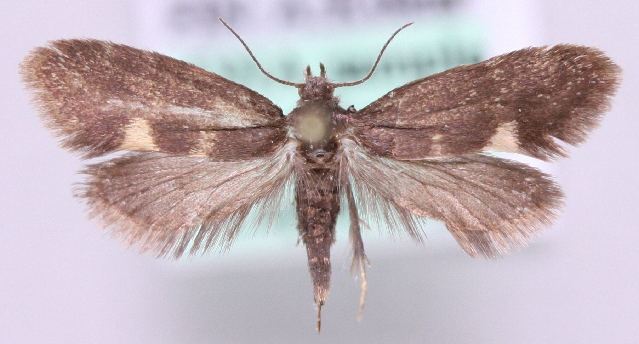

Scientific classification
- Kingdom: Animalia
- Phylum: Arthropoda
- Clade: Pancrustacea
- Class: Insecta
- Order: Lepidoptera
- Family: Prodoxidae
- Genus: Lampronia
- Species: L. morosa

Binomial name
- Lampronia morosa Zeller, 1852

= Lampronia morosa =

Species of moth

Lampronia morosa is a moth of the family Prodoxidae. It is found in most of Europe, except Ireland, Latvia, Lithuania, Portugal and part of the Balkan Peninsula. It is also present in the Caucasus and Asia Minor.

The wingspan is 12–15 mm. Adults are on wing in May and June.

The larvae feed on Rosa species.
