= Greya pectinifera =

Scientific classification
- Kingdom: Animalia
- Phylum: Arthropoda
- Clade: Pancrustacea
- Class: Insecta
- Order: Lepidoptera
- Family: Prodoxidae
- Genus: Greya
- Species: G. pectinifera

Binomial name
- Greya pectinifera Davis & Pellmyr, 1992

Species of moth

Greya pectinifera is a moth of the family Prodoxidae. It is found in moist coniferous forests on the Olympic Peninsula and in the Mount Rainier region of the Cascades in Washington.

The larvae possibly feed on Saxifraga species.
