= Lampronia argillella =

Scientific classification
- Kingdom: Animalia
- Phylum: Arthropoda
- Clade: Pancrustacea
- Class: Insecta
- Order: Lepidoptera
- Family: Prodoxidae
- Genus: Lampronia
- Species: L. argillella

Binomial name
- Lampronia argillella (Zeller, 1851)

Synonyms
- Incurvaria argillella Zeller, 1851

Species of moth

Lampronia argillella is a moth of the family Prodoxidae. It is found in Austria, Slovakia and the Caucasus.

The wingspan is 15–17 mm.
