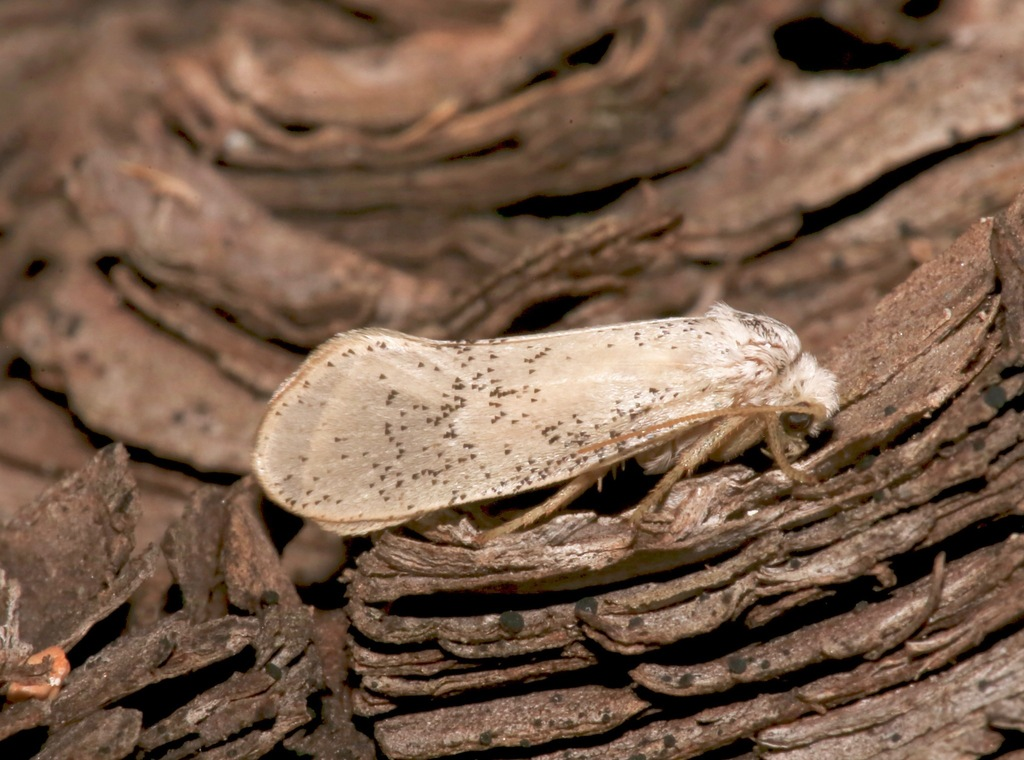

Scientific classification
- Kingdom: Animalia
- Phylum: Arthropoda
- Clade: Pancrustacea
- Class: Insecta
- Order: Lepidoptera
- Family: Prodoxidae
- Genus: Parategeticula
- Species: P. pollenifera

Binomial name
- Parategeticula pollenifera Davis, 1967

= Parategeticula pollenifera =

Species of moth

Parategeticula pollenifera is a moth of the family Prodoxidae. It is found in pine-oak forests in south-western Arizona, south-western New Mexico and Veracruz (in Mexico).

The wingspan is 24–31 mm.

The larvae feed on Yucca schottii and Yucca elephantipes.
