= Parategeticula martella =

Scientific classification
- Kingdom: Animalia
- Phylum: Arthropoda
- Clade: Pancrustacea
- Class: Insecta
- Order: Lepidoptera
- Family: Prodoxidae
- Genus: Parategeticula
- Species: P. martella

Binomial name
- Parategeticula martella Pellmyr & Balcazar-Lara, 2000

Species of moth

Parategeticula martella is a moth of the family Prodoxidae. It is found in southern Coahuila, Mexico.

The wingspan is 16-17.5 mm for males and 19-19.5 mm for females. Adults are on wing in March.

== Etymology ==
The species name is derived from Marte, the type locality in southern Coahuila.
