= Prodoxoides =

Scientific classification
- Kingdom: Animalia
- Phylum: Arthropoda
- Clade: Pancrustacea
- Class: Insecta
- Order: Lepidoptera
- Family: Prodoxidae
- Genus: Prodoxoides; Nielsen & Davis, 1985
- Species: P. asymmetra

Binomial name
- Prodoxoides asymmetra Nielsen & Davis, 1985

Genus of moths

Prodoxoides asymmetra is a moth of the family Prodoxidae. It is found in the Valdivian temperate rain forest and humid Nothofagus-Chusqua forest along the border of Chile (Osorno Province) and Argentina (Río Negro Province). It is the only known Prodoxidae species in the Southern Hemisphere.

The wingspan is 9–13 mm.
