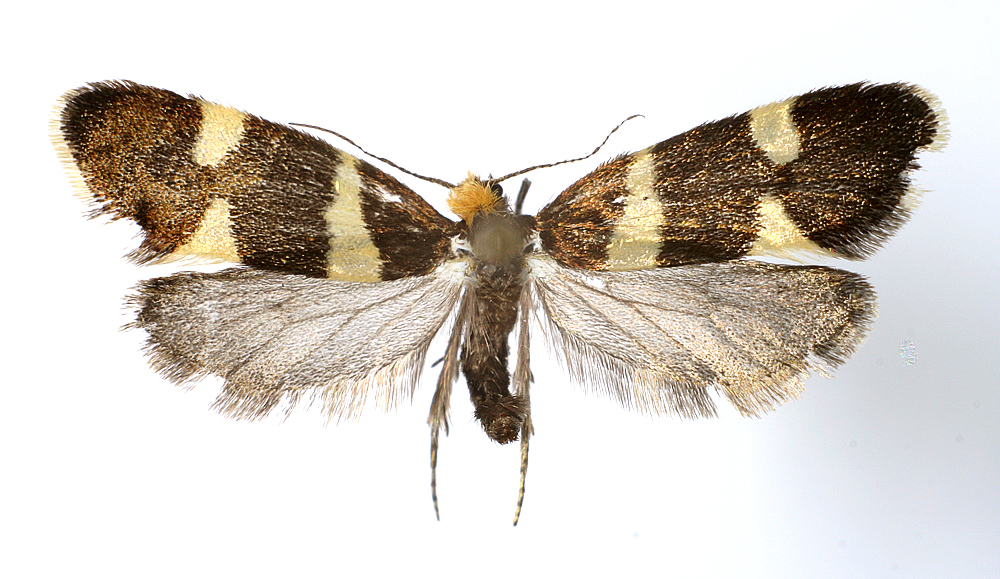

Scientific classification
- Kingdom: Animalia
- Phylum: Arthropoda
- Class: Insecta
- Order: Lepidoptera
- Family: Prodoxidae
- Genus: Lampronia
- Species: L. capitella

Binomial name
- Lampronia capitella (Clerck, 1759)

Synonyms
- Phalaena capitella Clerck, 1759

= Lampronia capitella =

Species of moth

The currant shoot borer moth (Lampronia capitella) is a species of moth of the family Prodoxidae. It is found in most of central, northern and eastern Europe. It is also found in North America.

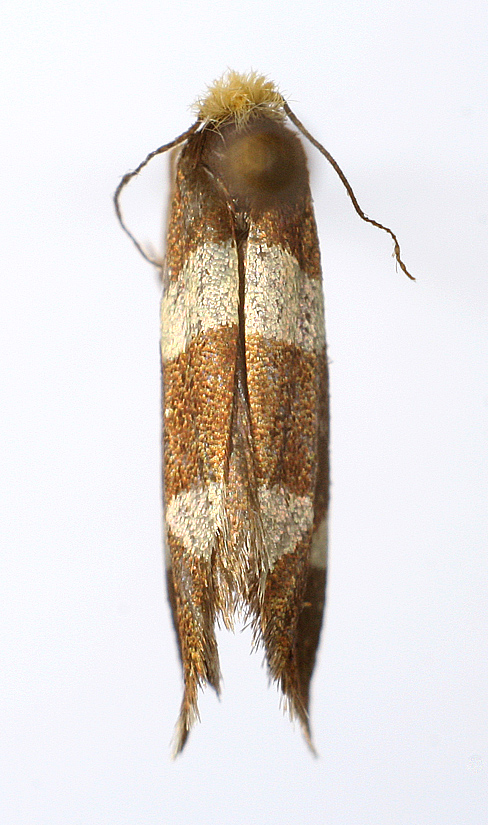

== Description ==
The wingspan is 14–17 mm. They are on wing from May to mid-July.

The larvae feed on the young green fruit of Ribes rubrum, Ribes uva-crispa and Ribes nigrum. Larvae can be found from August to September.
