= Tetragma =

Scientific classification
- Kingdom: Animalia
- Phylum: Arthropoda
- Clade: Pancrustacea
- Class: Insecta
- Order: Lepidoptera
- Family: Prodoxidae
- Genus: tetragma Davis & Pellmyr, 1992
- Species: T. gei

Binomial name
- Tetragma gei Davis & Pellmyr, 1992

Species of moth

Tetragma gei is a moth of the family Prodoxidae. It is found in herb-rich steppe and forest openings in Washington, Idaho, Wyoming, South Dakota, and Alberta.

The wingspan is 11–17 mm.

The larvae feed on Geum triflorum. Young larvae feed inside the developing seeds.
