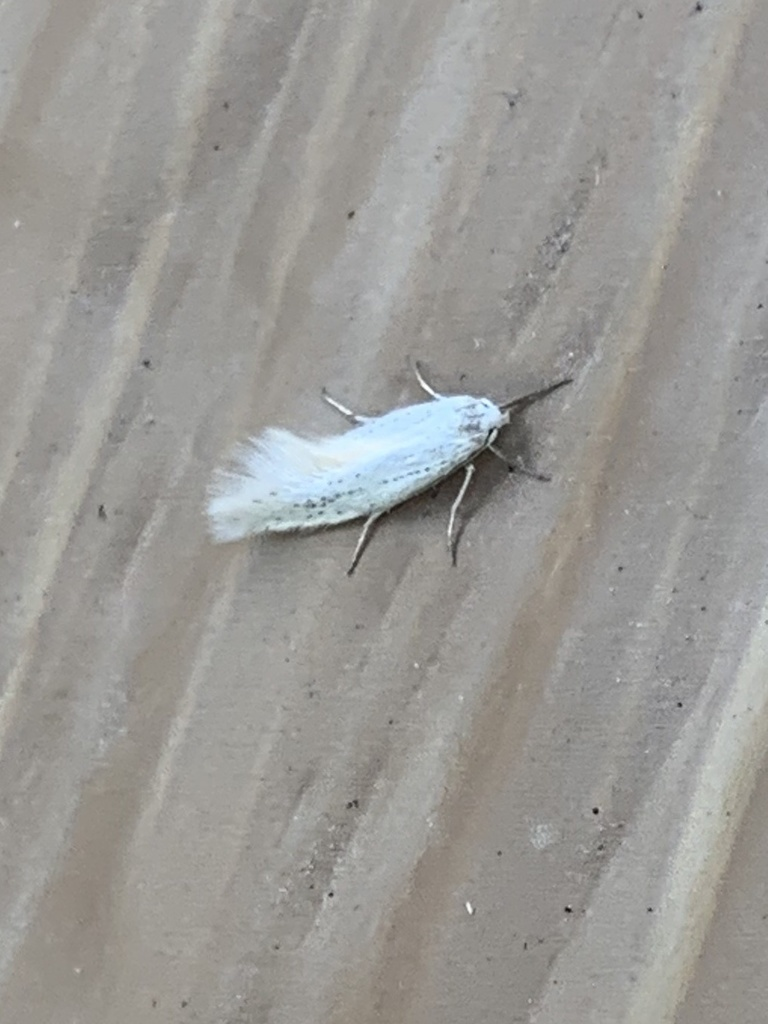

Scientific classification
- Kingdom: Animalia
- Phylum: Arthropoda
- Clade: Pancrustacea
- Class: Insecta
- Order: Lepidoptera
- Family: Prodoxidae
- Genus: Mesepiola; Davis, 1967
- Species: M. specca

Binomial name
- Mesepiola specca Davis, 1967

= Mesepiola =

Mesepiola specca

Species of moth

Mesepiola specca is a moth of the family Prodoxidae. It is found in desert and chaparral habitats in southern California, Arizona and New Mexico.

The wingspan is 8–12 mm. Adults feed on flower nectar of the larval host plants.

The larvae feed on Nolina and Dasylirion species.
