= Greya =

Scientific classification
- Domain: Eukaryota
- Kingdom: Animalia
- Phylum: Arthropoda
- Class: Insecta
- Order: Lepidoptera
- Family: Prodoxidae
- Genus: Greya; Busck, 1903

Species
- See text

Genus of moths

Greya is a genus of moths of the family Prodoxidae.

== Species ==
The genus consists of the following species:

- Greya enchrysa
- Greya kononenkoi
- Greya marginimaculata
- Greya mitellae
- Greya obscura
- Greya obscuromaculata
- Greya pectinifera
- Greya piperella
- Greya politella
- Greya powelli
- Greya punctiferella
- Greya reticulata
- Greya solenobiella
- Greya sparsipunctella
- Greya subalba
- Greya suffusca
- Greya variabilis
- Greya variata
