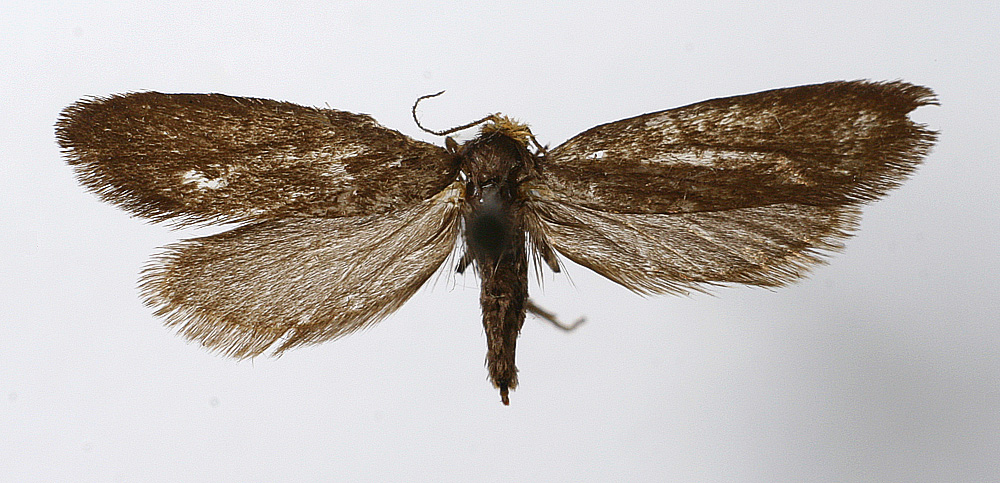

Scientific classification
- Domain: Eukaryota
- Kingdom: Animalia
- Phylum: Arthropoda
- Class: Insecta
- Order: Lepidoptera
- Family: Prodoxidae
- Genus: Lampronia
- Species: L. fuscatella

Binomial name
- Lampronia fuscatella (Tengström, 1848)

Synonyms
- Tinea fuscatella Tengström, 1848; Incurvaria tenuicornis Stainton, 1854

= Lampronia fuscatella =

Species of moth

Lampronia fuscatella is a moth of the family Prodoxidae. It is found in most of Europe, with the exception of Iceland, Ireland, Portugal, Italy and most of the Balkan Peninsula. To the east its range extends to the Baltic region and northern Russia.

The wingspan is 14–18 mm. Head whitish-yellowish. Forewings rather dark shining prismatic fuscous. Hindwings with hair-scales, grey. Adults are on wing from May to June and are active in the afternoon sunshine.

The larvae form a swelling, or gall on a twig of a Betula species, usually at a node, within which it feeds.
