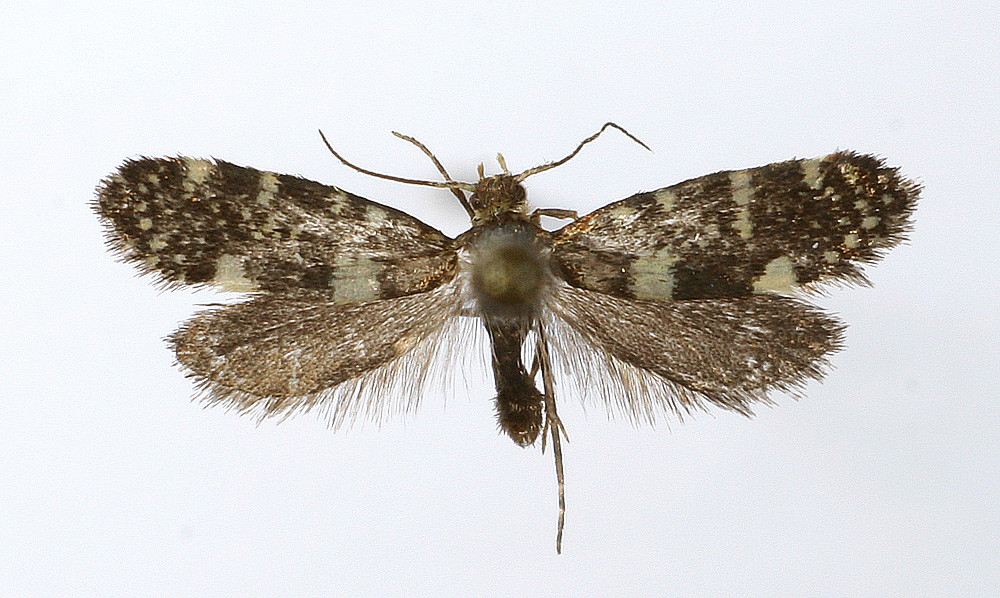

Scientific classification
- Domain: Eukaryota
- Kingdom: Animalia
- Phylum: Arthropoda
- Class: Insecta
- Order: Lepidoptera
- Family: Prodoxidae
- Genus: Lampronia; Stephens, 1829

= Lampronia =

Genus of moths

Lampronia is a genus of moths of the family Prodoxidae.

== Diversity ==
The genus has a Holarctic distribution and contains about twenty-five described species. There are additional undescribed species in North America, Japan and Iran.

== Biology ==
Most species are day-flying.

Lampronia corticella and Lampronia capitella are minor pests on raspberry (Rubus idaeus) and current (Ribes species).

== Species ==
- Subgenus Lampronia
  - Lampronia aeneella
  - Lampronia aeripennella
  - Lampronia altaica
  - Lampronia argillella
  - Lampronia capitella
  - Lampronia corticella
  - Lampronia flavimitrella
  - Lampronia fuscatella
  - Lampronia intermediella
  - Lampronia luzella
  - Lampronia morosa
  - Lampronia novempunctata
  - Lampronia oregonella
  - Lampronia provectella (syn: Lampronia triangulifera)
  - Lampronia psychidella
  - Lampronia pubicornis
  - Lampronia quinquepunctata
  - Lampronia redimitella
  - Lampronia rupella
  - Lampronia russatella
  - Lampronia sakhalinella
  - Lampronia splendidella
  - Lampronia standfussiella
  - Lampronia stangei
  - Lampronia taylorella
- Subgenus Tanysaccus Davis, 1978
  - Lampronia aenescens
  - Lampronia humilis
  - Lampronia sublustris
