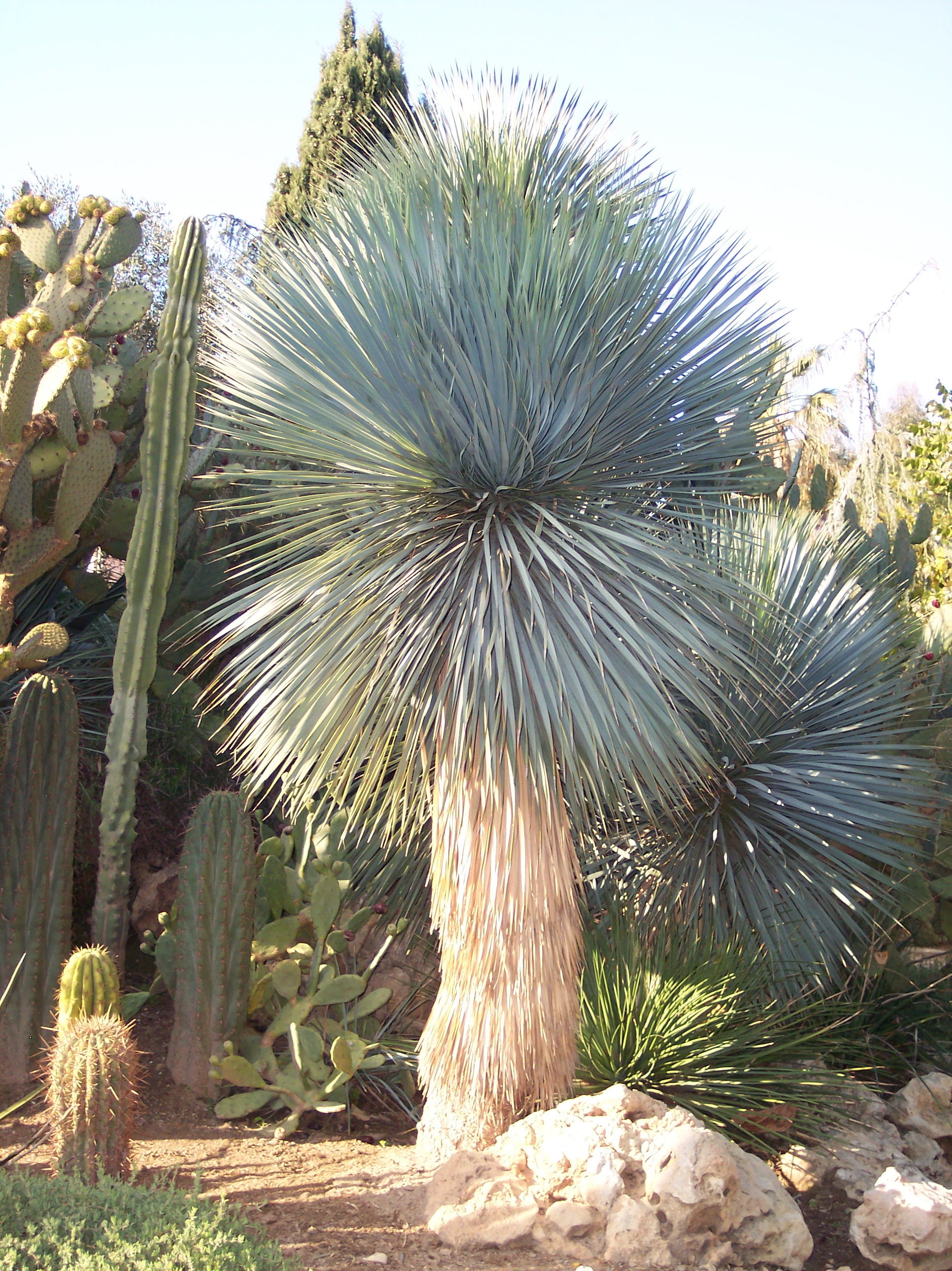
- Yucca rostrata

Conservation status
- Least Concern (IUCN 3.1)

Scientific classification
- Kingdom: Plantae
- Clade: Tracheophytes
- Clade: Angiosperms
- Clade: Monocots
- Order: Asparagales
- Family: Asparagaceae
- Subfamily: Agavoideae
- Genus: Yucca
- Species: Y. rostrata

Binomial name
- Yucca rostrata Engelm. ex Trel.
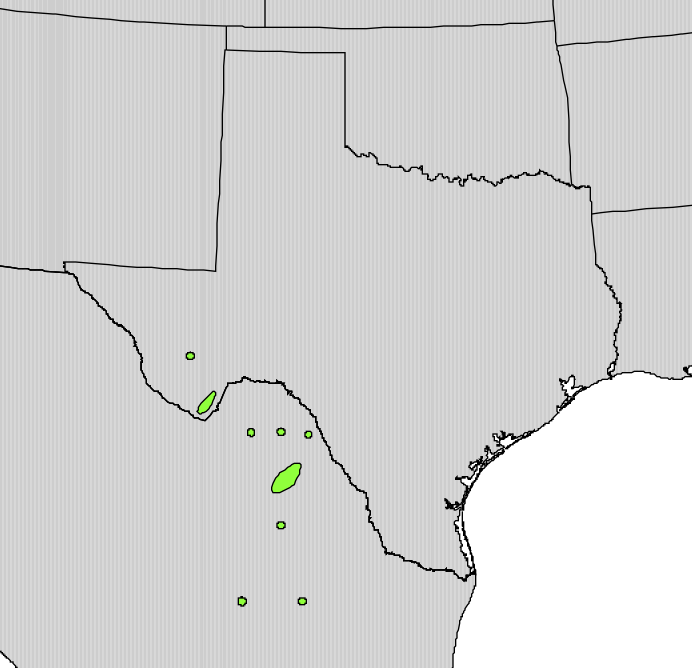

Synonyms
- Yucca linearis (Trel.) D.J.Ferguson; Yucca rostrata var. linearis Trel.

= Yucca rostrata =

Beaked yucca

Species of flowering plant

Yucca rostrata, also called beaked yucca, is a tree-like plant belonging to the genus Yucca. The species is native to Texas, and the Chihuahua and Coahuila regions of Mexico. This species of Yucca occurs in areas that are arid with little annual rainfall, normally Bw climates (desert) and Bs climates (steppe or semiarid).

Yucca rostrata has a trunk up to 4.5 meters tall, with a crown of leaves at the top. Leaves are thin, stiff, up to 60 cm long but rarely more than 15 mm wide, tapering to a sharp point at the tip. The inflorescence is a large panicle 100 cm tall, with white flowers.

== Cultivation ==
As one of the hardiest trunk-forming yuccas, Yucca rostrata can be grown successfully outdoors down to USDA hardiness zone 5 and is popular in many desert cities such as Palm Springs, CA, Phoenix, AZ, and Las Vegas, NV, in the Southwestern United States. The tree-like plant is also commonly cultivated in garden zones 7 and 8 in El Paso, Texas, Albuquerque, New Mexico, Salt Lake City, Utah, and Denver, Colorado. More recently, Yucca rostrata is being used in beach landscaping in coastal zone 7 and 8 areas of the East Coast, and can be found in coastal North Carolina, Virginia Beach, VA, Ocean City, MD, and on Long Island, NY and coastal Connecticut.

In Southern Europe, Yucca rostrata is cultivated in the subtropical Mediterranean region, including in southern Italy, Spain, Greece, and southern France. Rostrata is also cultivated in smaller numbers north into temperate Europe in the UK, Germany, and other areas. In European (away from the drier climates around the Mediterranean Sea) cultivation is often more difficult due to cool summers and frequent wet conditions found in these areas. However, many people in the cooler and wetter parts of Northwest Europe cover Yucca rostrata in winter to keep moisture off the plant. Yucca rostrata is also popular in Australia and is on occasion used as a specimen plant in home landscapes.

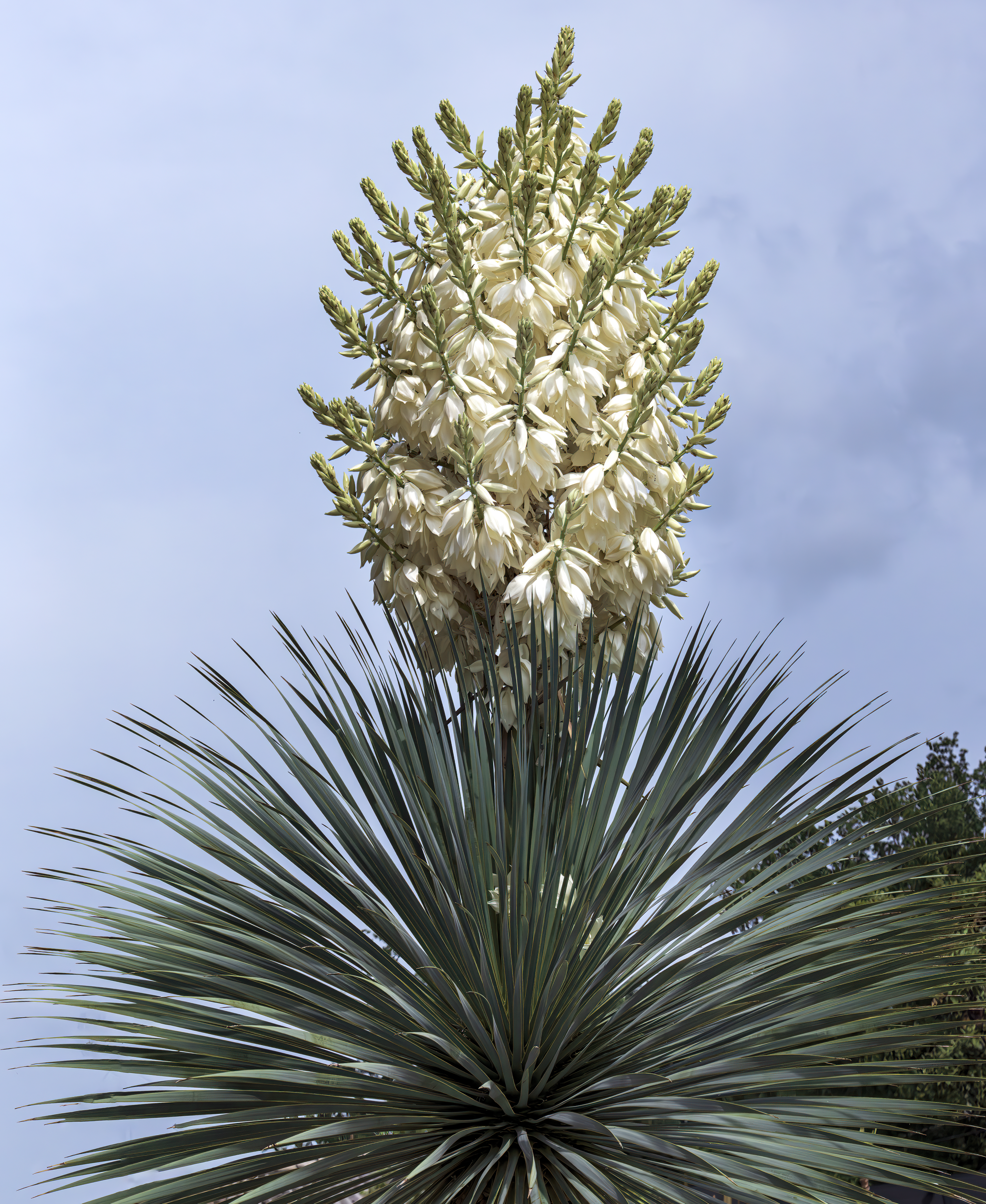
Inflorescence

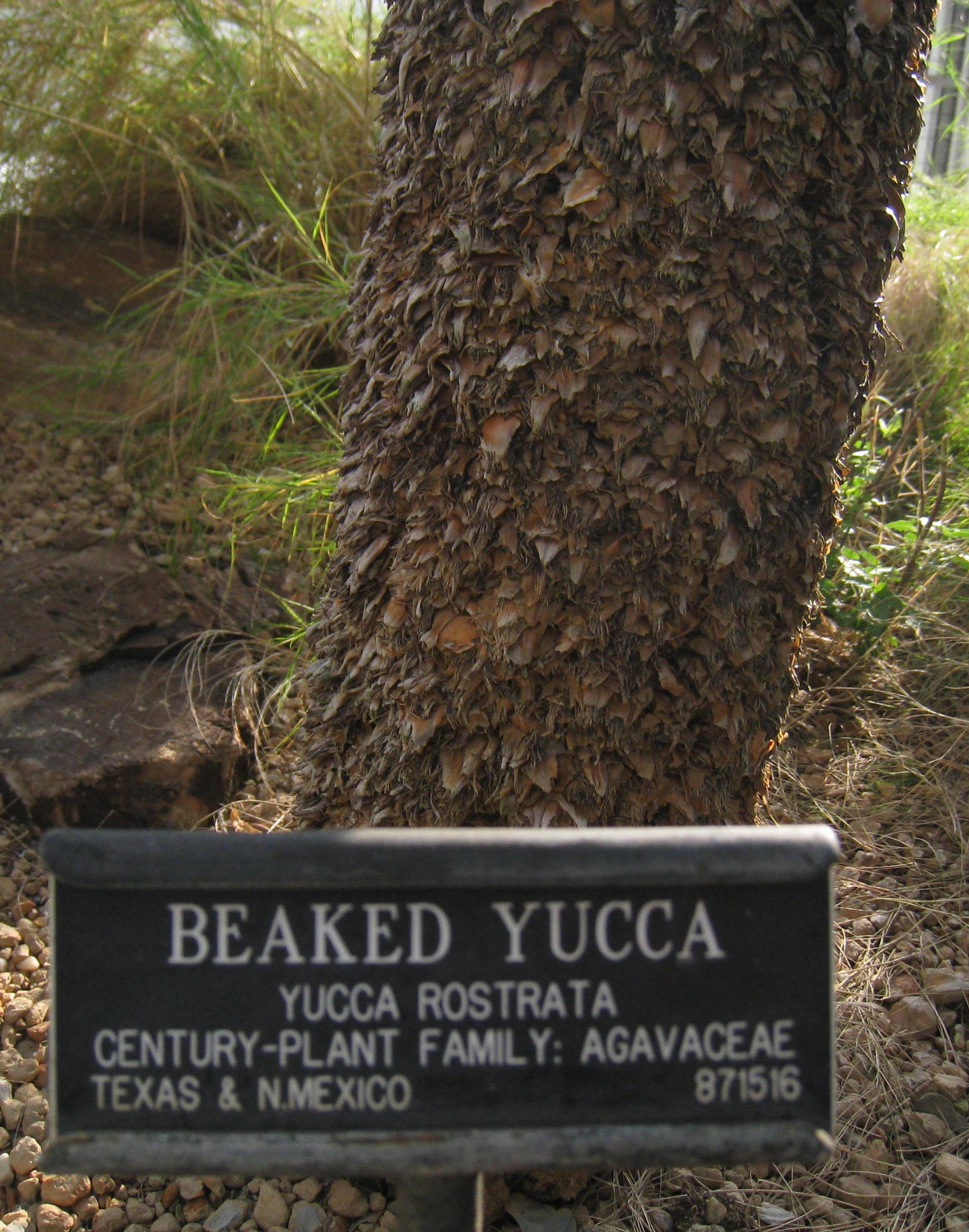
Detail of the trunk

=== Cultivars ===
- 'Sapphire Skies' has powder blue foliage.
