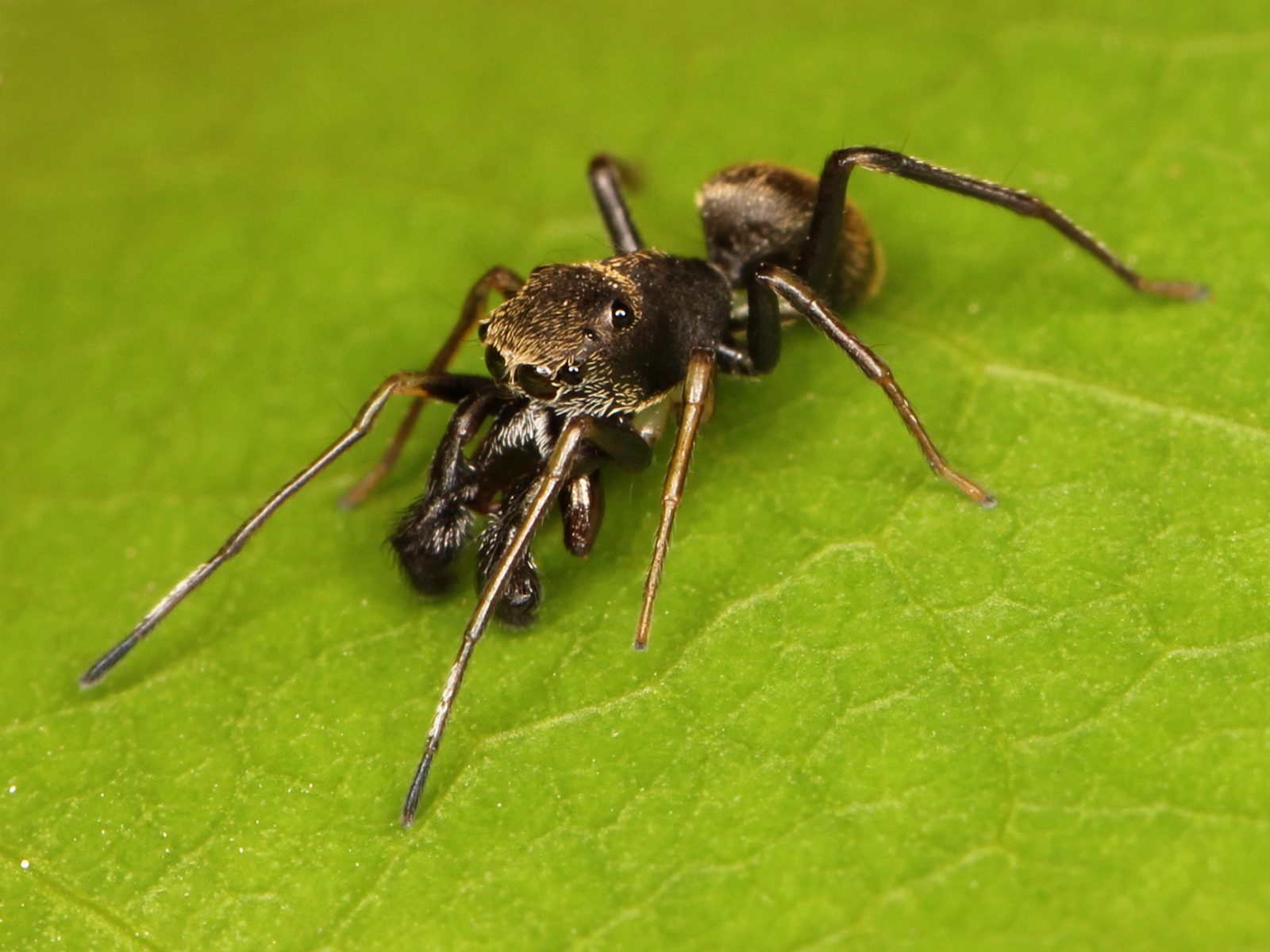
- Adult male Martella lineatipes from Belize

Scientific classification
- Kingdom: Animalia
- Phylum: Arthropoda
- Subphylum: Chelicerata
- Class: Arachnida
- Order: Araneae
- Infraorder: Araneomorphae
- Family: Salticidae
- Subfamily: Salticinae
- Genus: Martella; Peckham & Peckham, 1892

Type species
- M. pottsi Peckham & Peckham, 1892

Species
- 12, see text

= Martella (spider) =

Genus of spiders

Martella is a genus of ant mimicking jumping spiders that was first described by George and Elizabeth Peckham in 1892. Species of this genus are found in South America and Central America.

== Species ==
As of June 2019 it contains twelve species, found in Central America, Peru, Argentina, Brazil, and Mexico:

- Martella amapa Galiano, 1996 – Brazil
- Martella bicavata (Chickering, 1946) – Panama
- Martella camba (Galiano, 1969) – Argentina
- Martella furva (Chickering, 1946) – Panama
- Martella gandu Galiano, 1996 – Brazil
- Martella goianensis Galiano, 1969 – Brazil
- Martella lineatipes F. O. Pickard-Cambridge, 1900 – Mexico to Costa Rica
- Martella maria Peckham & Peckham, 1892 – Brazil
- Martella mutillaeformis (Taczanowski, 1878) – Peru
- Martella pasteuri Galiano, 1996 – Brazil
- Martella pottsi Peckham & Peckham, 1892 (type) – Guatemala to Brazil
- Martella utingae (Galiano, 1967) – Brazil
