= Brian Martella =

Australian rules footballer

Personal information
- Full name: Brian Martella
- Born: 28 November 1951
- Original team: Werribee Juniors
- Height: 184 cm (6 ft 0 in)
- Weight: 79 kg (174 lb)

Playing career^{1}
Years	Club	Games (Goals)
1971	Geelong	1 (0)
- ^{1} Playing statistics correct to the end of 1971.

Brian Martella (born 28 November 1951) is a former Australian rules footballer who played with Geelong in the Victorian Football League (VFL).

He made his debut against Essendon on 1 May 1971, but had little opportunity to impress as he only came onto the ground in the last quarter as a replacement for Wayne Closter.
