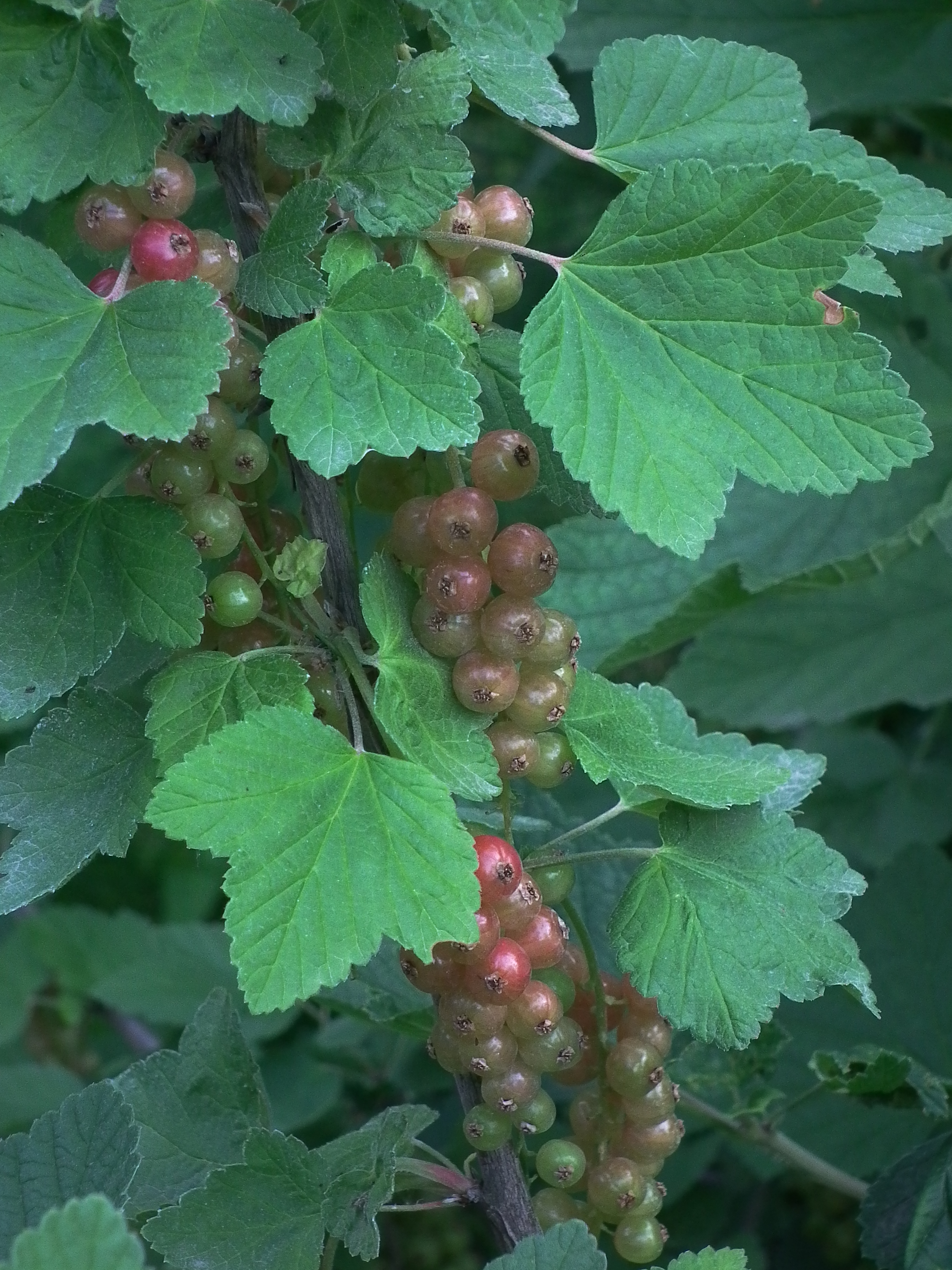
- Unripe fruit

Scientific classification
- Kingdom: Plantae
- Clade: Tracheophytes
- Clade: Angiosperms
- Clade: Eudicots
- Order: Saxifragales
- Family: Grossulariaceae
- Genus: Ribes
- Species: R. spicatum

Binomial name
- Ribes spicatum E.Robson

Synonyms
- List: Ribes heteromorphum Topa; Ribes lithuanicum Jancz.; Ribes liouanum Kitag.; Ribes pubescens (Hartm.) Hedl.; Ribes scandicum Hedl.; Ribes schlechtendalii Lange; Ribes spicatum var. pubescens (Hartm.) Cinovskis; Ribes palczewskii (Jancz.) Pojark.

= Ribes spicatum =

Species of plant in the genus Ribes

Ribes spicatum, the downy currant or Nordic currant, is a species of shrub in the family Grossulariaceae, native to northern Europe and northern Asia. Its bright red berries are edible and quite good‑tasting. It can be differentiated from the more common redcurrant (Ribes rubrum) not so much by its leaf hairs, as these tend to fall off as the leaf ages, but by other characteristics: the leaves of R. spicatum are a duller and darker green than R. rubrum with its paler yellowish‑green leaves. R. spicatum holds its leaves at a right angle to the stem, whereas R. rubrum leaves are less erect, markedly distinguishing the overall form of the bushes. R. spicatum has green petioles, but R. rubrum petioles are more orange‑ish.

== Subspecies ==
The following subspecies is currently accepted:

- Ribes spicatum subsp. hispidulum (Janch.) L.Hämet-Ahti
