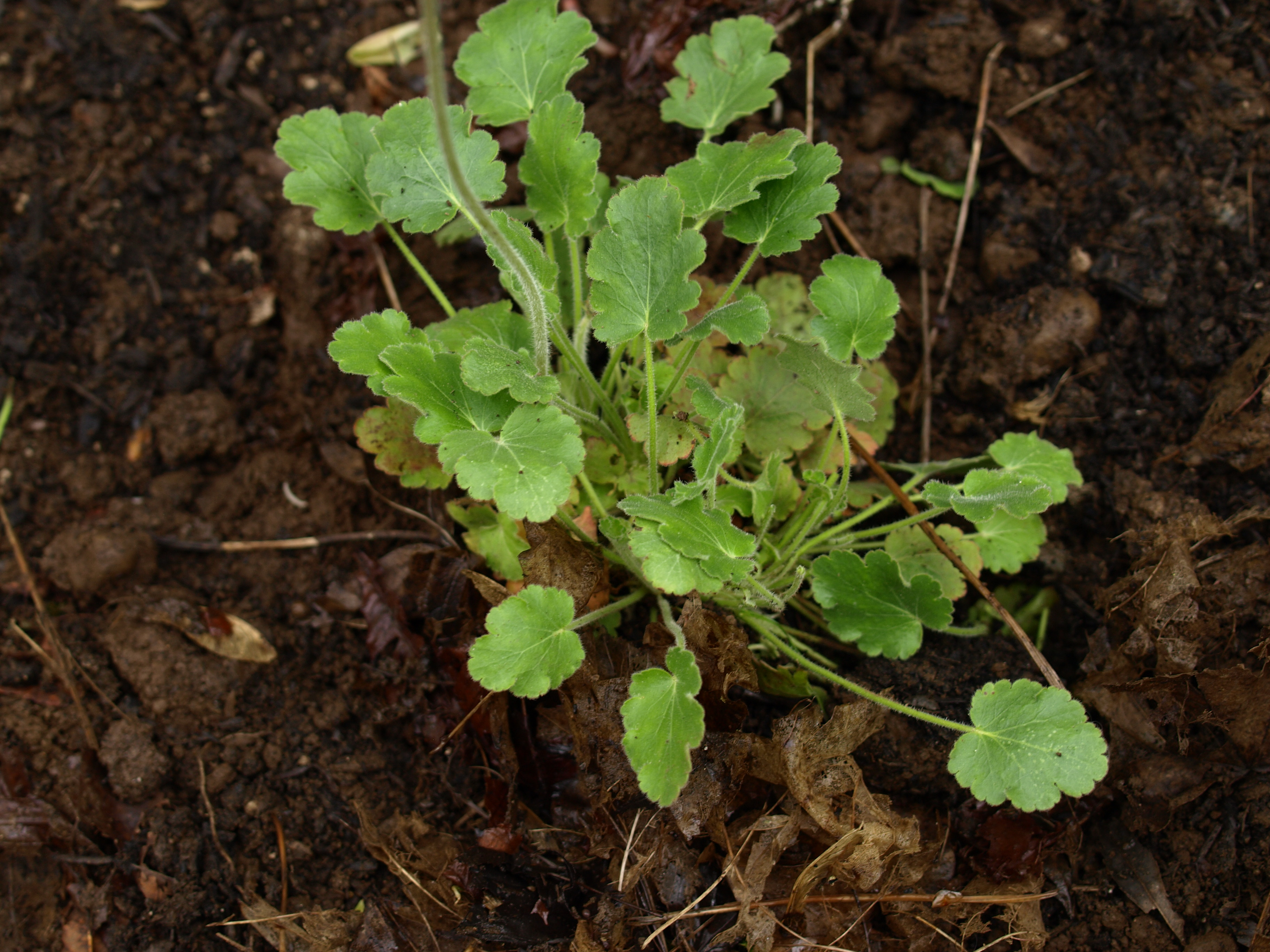
- Heuchera cylindrica in spring

Conservation status
- Secure (NatureServe)

Scientific classification
- Kingdom: Plantae
- Clade: Tracheophytes
- Clade: Angiosperms
- Clade: Eudicots
- Order: Saxifragales
- Family: Saxifragaceae
- Genus: Heuchera
- Species: H. cylindrica

Binomial name
- Heuchera cylindrica Douglas

= Heuchera cylindrica =

Species of flowering plant

Heuchera cylindrica is a species of perennial flowering plant in the saxifrage family known by the common names poker alumroot, roundleaf alumroot, and coral bells. It is native to western North America, where it is found from British Columbia to California, and east to Wyoming and Montana.

== Description ==
A saxifrage with basal, oval to round leaves. These are often lobed or toothed. Flowers are in a spike on an erect leafless stem which can reach up to 35 inches in height. Flowers are bell-shaped and can be pale yellow, cream, green or pink.

== Distribution and habitat ==
Heuchera cylindrica is native to rocky areas in the woods, cliff-side ledges, slopes and sub-alpine meadows in the Pacific Northwest. It prefers soil rich in humus, that receives plenty of moisture, but is well drained. It can thrive in sunny or partly shady habitats. The species is widespread and locally common, so it is considered ecologically secure.
