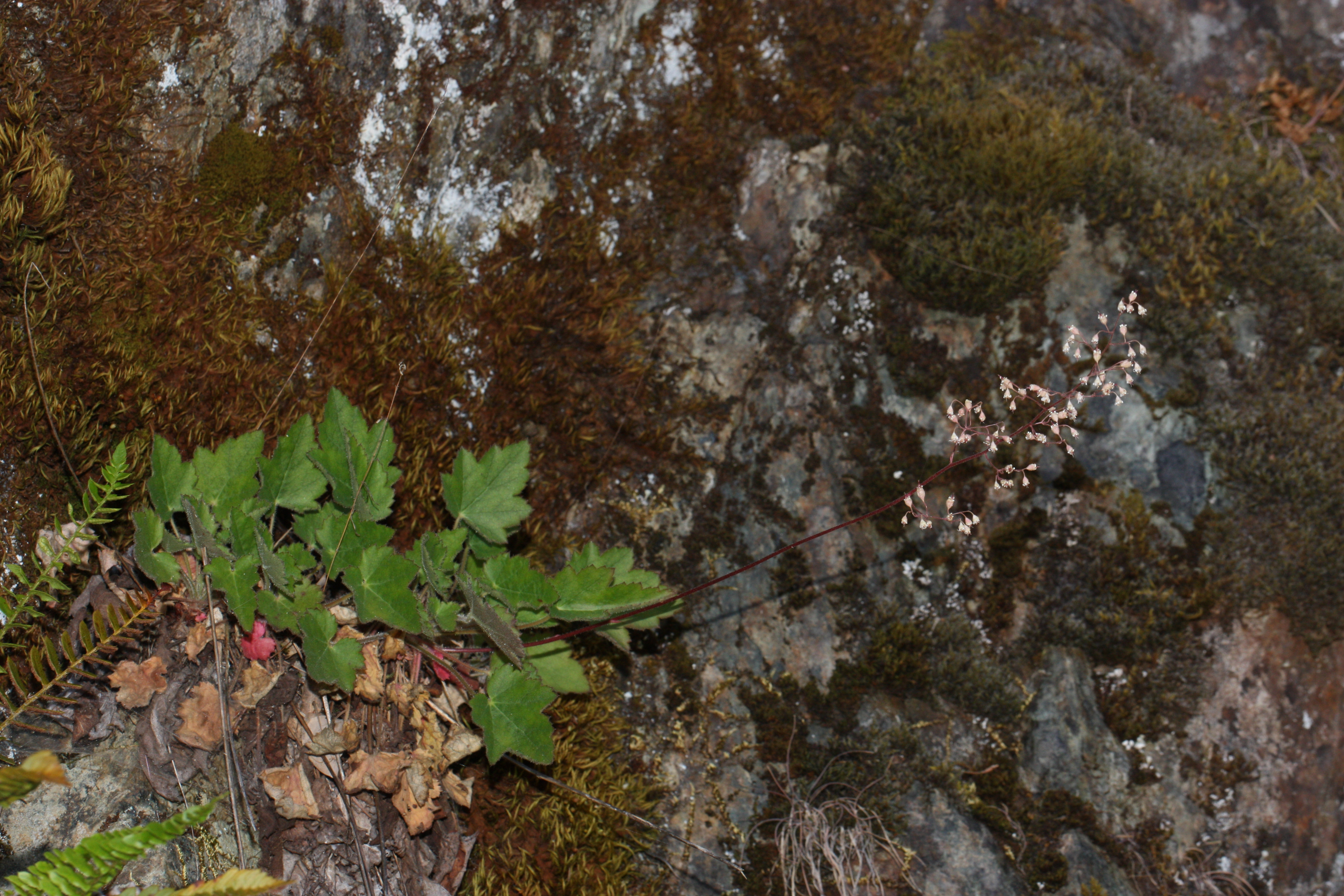
- Heuchera micrantha in Rogue Wild and Scenic River

Scientific classification
- Kingdom: Plantae
- Clade: Tracheophytes
- Clade: Angiosperms
- Clade: Eudicots
- Order: Saxifragales
- Family: Saxifragaceae
- Genus: Heuchera
- Species: H. micrantha

Binomial name
- Heuchera micrantha Dougl. ex Lindl.

= Heuchera micrantha =

Crevice alumroot

Species of flowering plant

Heuchera micrantha is a species of flowering plant in the saxifrage family known by the common name crevice alumroot, or small-flowered alumroot.

== Distribution ==
It is native to western North America from British Columbia to California, where it grows on rocky slopes and cliffs.

== Description ==
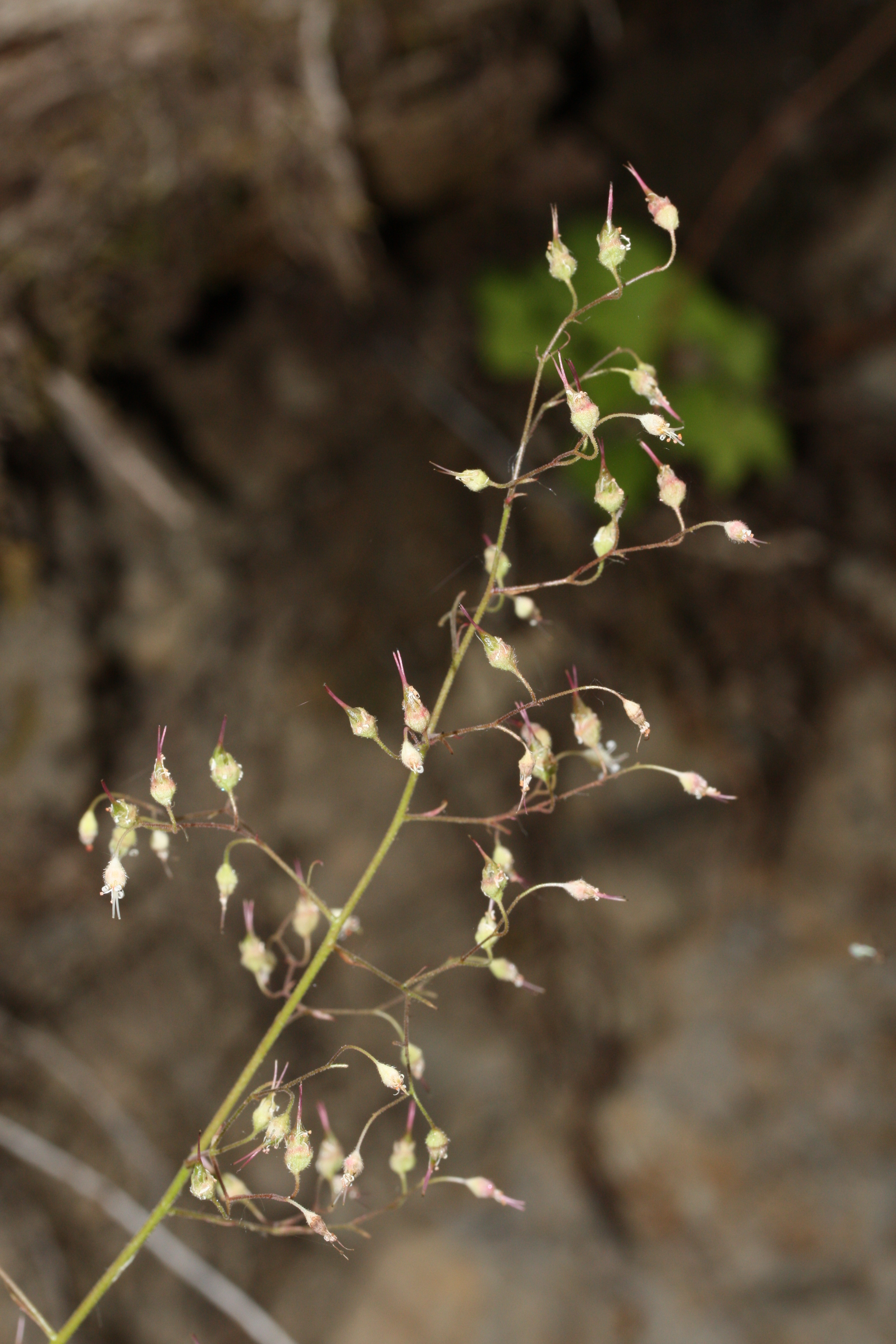
Each rounded flower has fleshy, hairy lobes tipped with tiny petals and protruding stamens and stigma.

This plant is quite variable in appearance. There are a number of wild and cultivated varieties. The leaves are lobed and usually coated in glandular hairs. They are green to reddish-green or purple-green in color and may have very long, gland-dotted petioles. The plant produces an erect inflorescence up to a meter high bearing many clusters of pink, white, or greenish flowers. Each rounded flower has fleshy, hairy lobes tipped with tiny petals and protruding stamens and stigma.

Native Americans pounded the root to make a poultice.
