= Parategeticula =

Scientific classification
- Kingdom: Animalia
- Phylum: Arthropoda
- Class: Insecta
- Order: Lepidoptera
- Family: Prodoxidae
- Genus: Parategeticula; Davis, 1967

Genus of moths

Parategeticula is a genus of moths of the family Prodoxidae, one of three genera known as yucca moths; they are mutualistic pollinators of various Yucca species.

== Species ==
- Parategeticula ecdysiastica
- Parategeticula elephantipella
- Parategeticula martella
- Parategeticula pollenifera
- Parategeticula tzoyatlella
