= Prodoxidae =

Scientific classification
- Kingdom: Animalia
- Phylum: Arthropoda
- Class: Insecta
- Order: Lepidoptera
- Superfamily: Adeloidea
- Family: Prodoxidae; Riley, 1881

Genera
- Greya; Lampronia; Mesepiola; Parategeticula; Prodoxoides; Prodoxus (syn: Agavenema); Tegeticula; Tetragma

Diversity
- About 9 genera and 98 species

Family of moths

The Prodoxidae are a family of moths, generally small in size and undistinguished in appearance. They include species of moderate pest status, like the currant shoot borer, and others of considerable ecological and evolutionary interest, such as various species of "yucca moths".

== Description and affinities ==
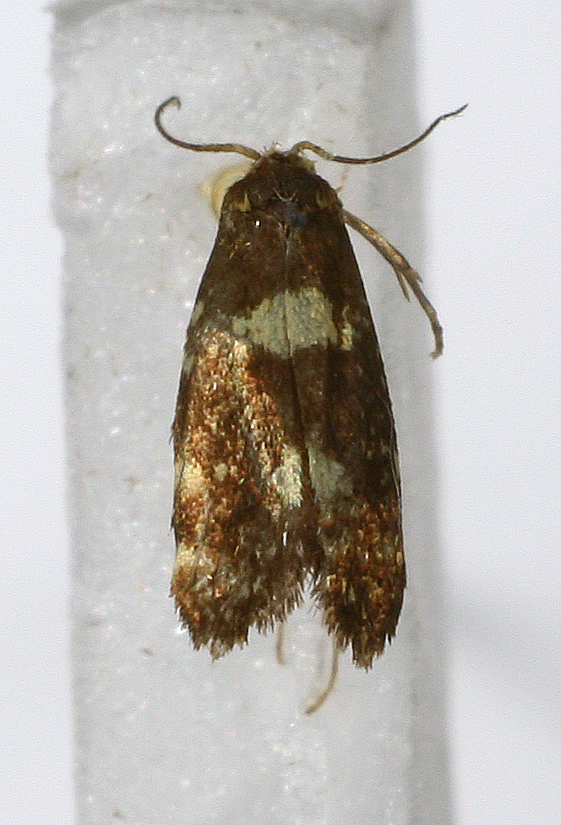
Lampronia corticella

Prodoxidae are a family of primitive monotrysian Lepidoptera. Some of these small-to-medium-sized moths are day flying, like Lampronia capitella, known to European gardeners as the currant shoot borer. Others occur in Africa and Asia. The other common genera are generally confined to dry areas of the United States. Tetragma gei feeds on mountain avens (Geum triflorum) in the US. Greya politella lay eggs in the flowers of Saxifragaceae there. Prodoxoides asymmetra occurs in Chile and Argentina, but all other prodoxid moth genera have a northern distribution. The enigmatic genus Tridentaforma is sometimes placed here and assumed to be close to Lampronia, while other authors consider it incertae sedis among the closely related family Adelidae.

== Yucca moths and coevolution ==
"Yucca moths" have a remarkable biology. They are famous for an old and intimate relationship with Yucca plants and are their obligate pollinators as well as herbivores. Interactions of these organisms range from obligate mutualism to commensalism to outright antagonism. Their bore holes are a common sight on trunks of such plants as the soaptree yucca. Two of the three yucca moth genera in particular, Tegeticula and Parategeticula, have an obligate pollination mutualism with yuccas. Yuccas are only pollinated by these moths, and the pollinator larvae feed exclusively on yucca seeds; the female moths use their modified mouthparts to insert the pollen into the stigma of the flowers, after having oviposited in the ovary, where the larvae feed on some (but not all) of the developing ovules. This obligate pollination mutualism is similar to the mutualistic relationship between the senita cactus and the senita moth. Species of the third genus of yucca moths, Prodoxus, are not engaged in the pollination mutualism, nor do the larvae feed on developing seeds. Their eggs are deposited in fruits and leaves, where they eat and grow, not emerging until fully mature. One species of yucca moth, Tegeticula intermedia, betrays this obligate mutualism by not pollinating the yucca while still laying its eggs on the host plant, cheating the yucca out of any benefits from this relationship.

Coevolution is particularly important in evolutionary biology as it demonstrates increased genetic variance between two organisms that have strong interactions, resulting in increased fitness generally for both species. In an effort to further investigate the traits that have evolved as a result of coevolution, Pellmyr and his team utilized a phylogenetic framework to observe the evolution of active pollination and specializing effects of the yucca moths which eventually lead to the loss of nectar in the genus of yucca plants, requiring them to have Prodoxidae moths around to reproduce. The moths in this case, specifically Tegeticula and Parategeticula, pollinate yucca flower purposefully, and lay their eggs in the flowers. The larvae of the moths rely on yucca seeds as nourishment and this is also cost inflicted on the plants to maintain the mutualism. A test experiment was set up which involved pairing species of Prodoxidae with different host plants. The results showed how moths which were able to develop a pollination-type relationship with the new plant species were more successful and better at reproducing than moths that were unable to do so.

Another study takes a look at coevolution as a primary driver of change and diversification in the yucca moth and the Joshua tree, more commonly known as the yucca palm. The researchers tested this hypothesis by setting up a differential selection of two species of yucca moths and two corresponding species of yucca palms which they pollinate. The study showed floral traits involving pollination evolved substantially more rapidly than other flower features. The study then looks at phylogeny and determines that coevolution is the major evolutionary force behind diversification in the yucca palms when pollinated moths were present. The researchers of the Joshua tree show that setting up phylogenetic patterns using maximum likelihood techniques, can be a powerful tool to analyze the divergence in species.

Researchers have again tried to demonstrate the absolute minimal level of evolution needed to secure a yucca plant and moth mutualism. The researchers attempt to find an answer as to how integral coevolution was as the driving force behind various adaptions between the yucca moth and plant species. Phylogenetic examination was also used here to reconstruct the trait evolution of the pollinating yucca moths and their non-mutualistic variants. Certain mutualistic traits have predated the yucca moth-plant mutualism, such as larval feeding in the floral ovary. However, it suggests that other key traits linked to pollination were indeed a result of coevolution between the two species. It is integral to reiterate here that key traits such as tentacular appendages which help in pollen collection and pollinating behaviors evolved as a result of coevolution during a mutualism between moths and host plants. After collecting genetic information from dozens of differing Prodoxidae moths, including ones involved in ideal mutualisms such as Tegeticula, and mapping these extracted sequences using the BayesTraits clade forming algorithm, conclusions could be drawn about trait formation that differentiated the monophylum or clade of strict obligate pollinators in the family Prodoxidae from other moths which did not undergo mutualism.
