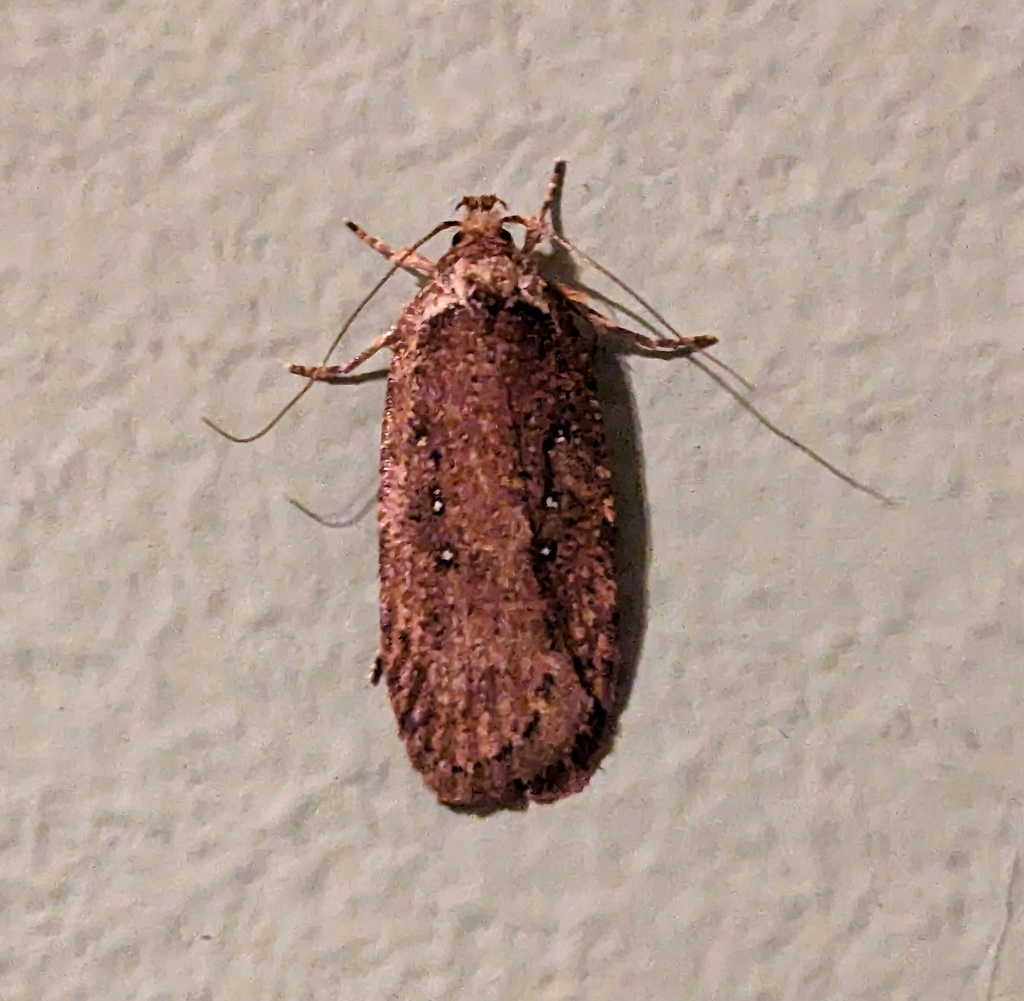

Scientific classification
- Kingdom: Animalia
- Phylum: Arthropoda
- Clade: Pancrustacea
- Class: Insecta
- Order: Lepidoptera
- Family: Depressariidae
- Genus: Agonopterix
- Species: A. rosaciliella

Binomial name
- Agonopterix rosaciliella (Busck, 1904)

Synonyms
- Depressaria rosaciliella Busck, 1904; Depressaria rosiciliella Meyrick, 1922; Agonopterix rosaciliella echinopanicis Clarke, 1941

= Agonopterix rosaciliella =

Species of moth

Agonopterix rosaciliella is a moth in the family Depressariidae. It was described by August Busck in 1904. It is found in North America, where it has been recorded from Alaska and western Saskatchewan through Washington to California and Arizona.

The wingspan is 20–26 mm. The forewings are ochreous-white overlaid with reddish and suffused with reddish fuscous, and irrorated with sparse blackish scales. The basal portion of the forewings is light and contains a fuscous spot and is followed by a deep reddish-fuscous shade. There is a series distinct fuscous spots on the costa and termen, the former alternated with small whitish-ochreous spots. There are also four white discal spots, edged with black. The hindwings are light fuscous.

The larvae feed on Angelica arguta, Angelica hendersonii, Conioselinum chinense, Ligusticum apiifolium, Oenanthe sarmentosa, Osmorhiza chilensis, Osmorhiza occidentalis and Echinopanax horridum.
