= A. polyclada =

A. polyclada may refer to:

- Ahnfeltiopsis polyclada, a red algae
- Angelica polyclada, a perennial plant
