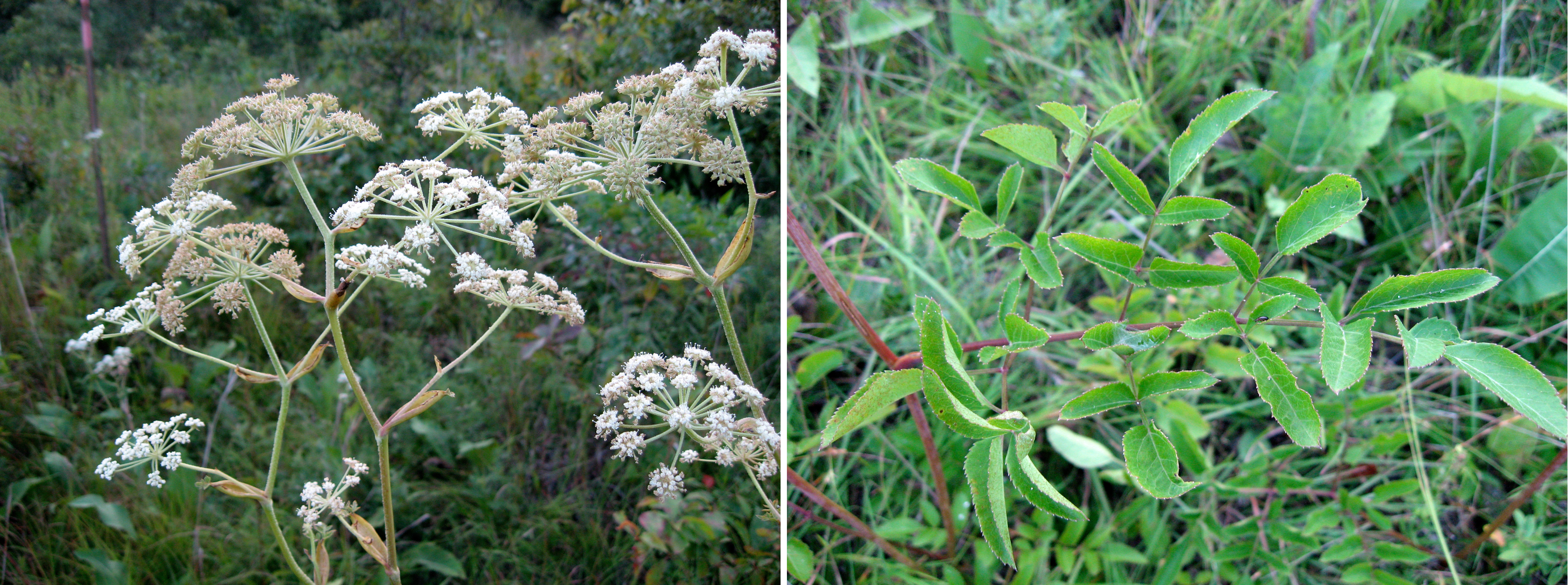

Scientific classification
- Kingdom: Plantae
- Clade: Tracheophytes
- Clade: Angiosperms
- Clade: Eudicots
- Clade: Asterids
- Order: Apiales
- Family: Apiaceae
- Genus: Angelica
- Species: A. venenosa

Binomial name
- Angelica venenosa (Greenway) Fernald

Synonyms
- Cicuta venenosa Greenway

= Angelica venenosa =

Species of flowering plant

Angelica venenosa is a species of flowering plant, known as hairy angelica, in the family Apiaceae. It is native to the Eastern United States where it ranges from the East Coast to the Ouachita Mountains. It is most often found in open, acidic areas. In the Midwest, its habitat includes prairies and savannas.

It is a tall perennial, reaching heights of 2 meters. It produces an umbel of flowers in late spring and early summer.

A recent publication has suggested that populations in the Fall Line Sandhills area of the Southeast have a number of unusual morphological features and may be worthy of taxonomic recognition. At the present, no varieties or subspecies of Angelica venenosa are recognized.
