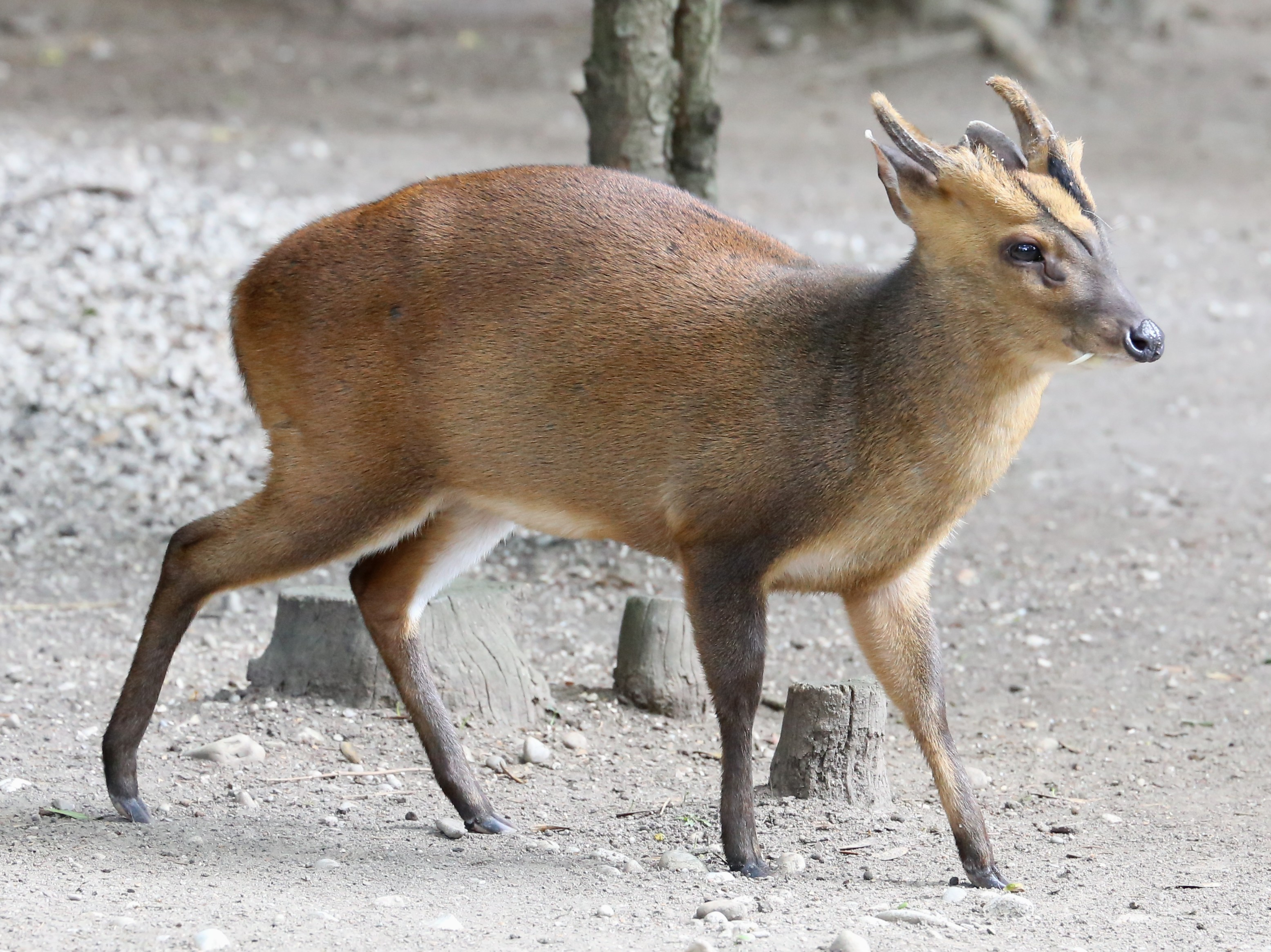
- At Augsburg Zoo

Conservation status
- Least Concern (IUCN 3.1)

Scientific classification
- Kingdom: Animalia
- Phylum: Chordata
- Class: Mammalia
- Order: Artiodactyla
- Family: Cervidae
- Genus: Muntiacus
- Species: M. reevesi

Binomial name
- Muntiacus reevesi (Ogilby, 1839)
- Reeves's muntjac range, according to IUCN (2016). Extant Possibly extant Extant & introduced

= Reeves's muntjac =

Species of deer

Reeves's muntjac (Muntiacus reevesi), also known as the Chinese muntjac, is a species of muntjac found widely in south-eastern China (from Gansu to Yunnan) and Taiwan. It has also been introduced in the United Kingdom, Ireland, the Netherlands, Belgium, and Japan. It takes its name from John Reeves, a naturalist employed by the British East India Company in the 19th century.

== Description ==
Reeves's muntjac grows to 0.5 m (1 ft 8 in) high at the shoulder and 0.95 m (3 ft 1 in) in length, plus a short tail up to 4 in (10 cm) long. It weighs between 10 and 18 kg (22 and 40 lb) when fully grown. It is reddish-brown in appearance with striped markings on its face. The belly is creamy-white, with lighter fur extending to the neck, chin, and the underside of the tail. The males have short antlers, usually 4 in (10 cm) or less, and long upper canines (tusks), usually about 2 in (5.1 cm) long. Females have bony lumps on their foreheads and localised black spots. The Taiwanese subspecies (M. r. micrurus), commonly known as the Formosan Reeves's muntjac, is darker than other subspecies.

At Dumbleton Hall
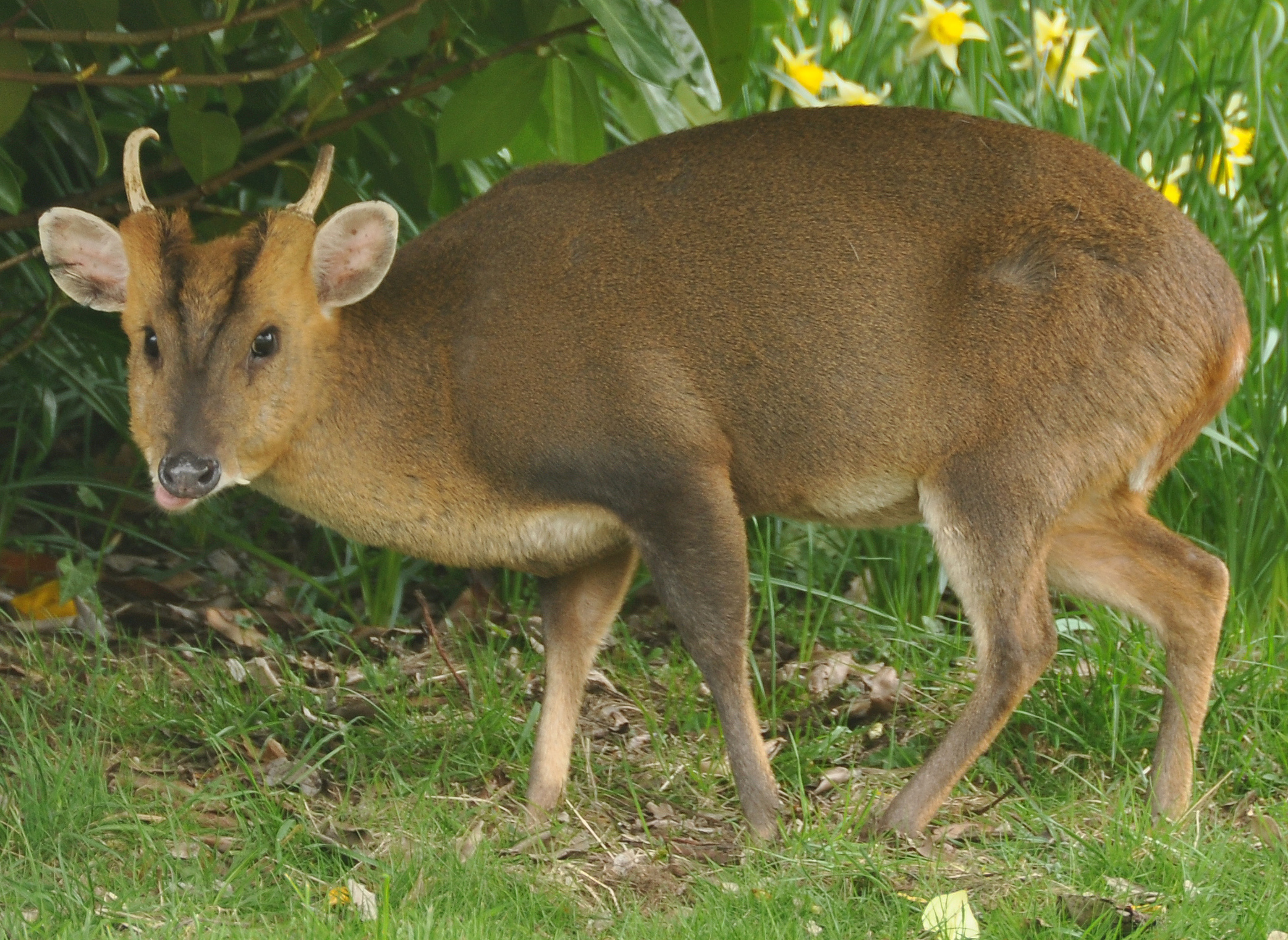

== Behaviour ==
Reeves's muntjac feeds on herbs, blossoms, succulent shoots, fungi, berries, grasses, and nuts, and has also been reported to eat tree bark. Eggs and carrion are eaten opportunistically. It is also called the barking deer due to its distinctive barking sound, though this name is also used for other species of muntjacs. The barking sound is common during mating or when provoked. Its preferred habitats are forest and shrubland. It is a solitary and crepuscular animal. Both males and females defend small territories that they mark with preorbital gland secretions that are thought to be pheromonal in nature. When fighting, males first use their antlers to push enemies off balance so they can wound them with their 2 in (5.1 cm) upper canine teeth.

On Hachijō-jima

== Reproduction ==
Female, Prague Zoo
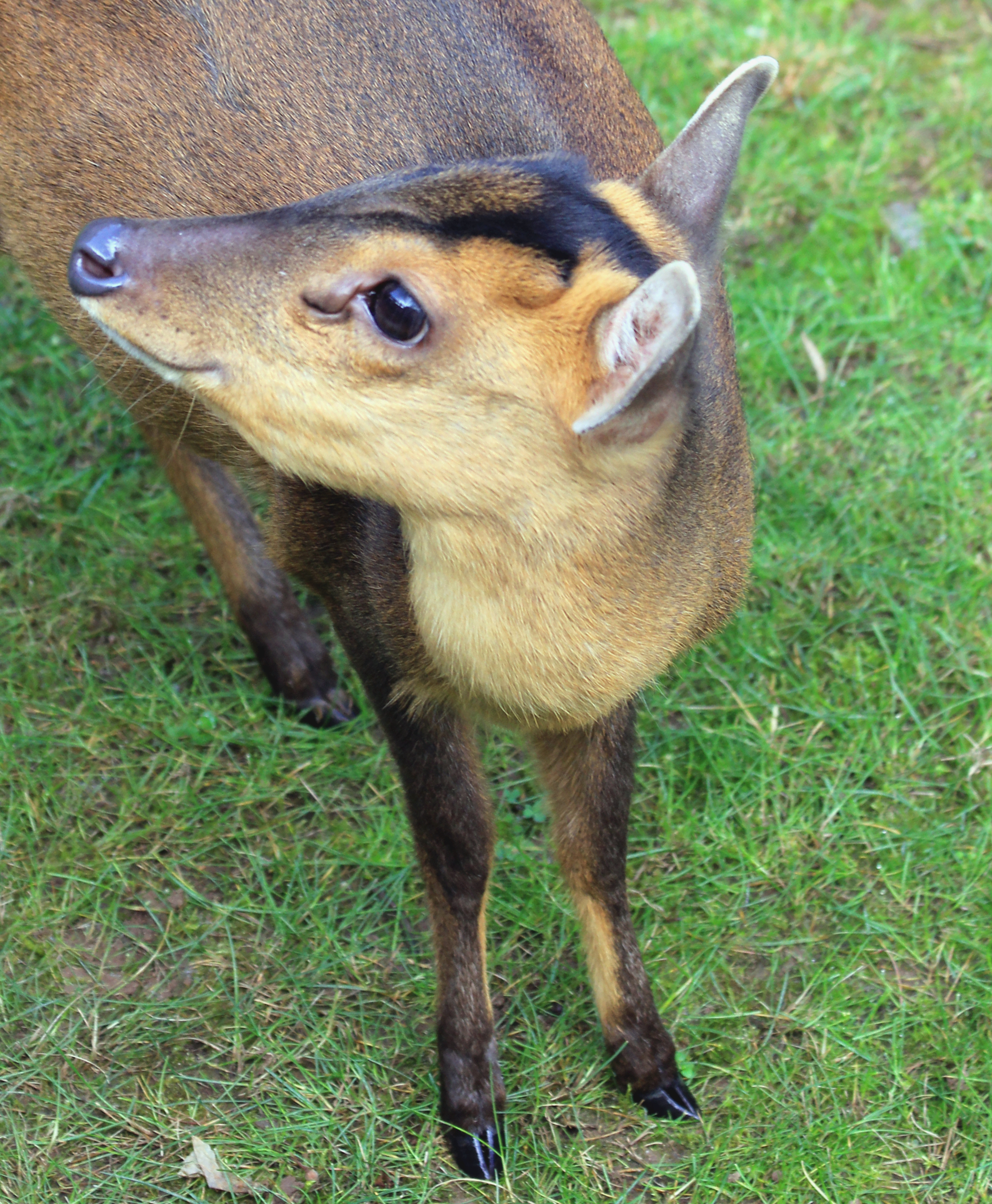

Female muntjacs (known as "does") become sexually mature within the first year of life. Mating occurs throughout the year. Their gestation period lasts from 209 to 220 days. Females limit the number of mating bouts, though time between successive bouts is determined by males (known as "bucks").

== Distribution ==
It is widely found in south-eastern China (from Gansu to Yunnan) and Taiwan. It has also been introduced in several other regions.

=== Continental Europe ===
It has been introduced in Belgium and seen in the Netherlands. Populations were once present in France, but this is no longer the case as of 2020.

In Europe, this species is included since 2016 in the list of Invasive Alien Species of Union concern (the Union list). This implies that this species cannot be imported, bred, transported, commercialised, or intentionally released into the environment in the whole of the European Union.

=== Great Britain ===
Reeves's muntjacs were first introduced to the UK in the early 19th century.

In the late 19th century, the then Duke of Bedford brought some to Woburn Abbey in Bedfordshire, then in 1901 released them into the surrounding woods. A few more probably escaped from the nearby Whipsnade Zoo. During the mid-20th century, Woburn conducted several deliberate releases in distant locations throughout England. It is suspected that there were also other unrecorded releases or escapes from private collections. These releases later caused misperception that muntjacs spread very rapidly. The estimated population of Reeves's muntjacs in England was 52,000 in 1995, and 104,000 in 2008.

Under the Wildlife and Countryside Act 1981 it was illegal to release the species except where already established, and the Invasive Alien Species (Enforcement and Permitting) Order 2019 has subsequently prohibited the capture and re-release of muntjac in all cases. As of 2017, colonies exist throughout England south of the Humber, and the population continues to grow.

=== Ireland ===
It has been introduced in the Republic of Ireland.

Sightings in 2008 caused the government, concerned at the risk of the species becoming established, to quickly introduce a year-round hunting season.

=== Japanese archipelago ===
Sometime before the 1980s, several specimens escaped from an exhibition zoo in Chiba Prefecture in eastern Japan. By 2023, their numbers had grown to 71,500. It is considered a harmful invasive species. Also, Reeves's muntjac escaped a zoo on Izu Ōshima in 1970 when a fence fell due to a typhoon. They have inflicted severe damage to the local ashitaba plantations. A muntjac eradication effort on Izu Ōshima was undertaken in 2007–2014 but failed, and as of 2014, at least 11,000 individuals exist and have a yearly population growth rate of 15%. This failure has been blamed on inadequate survey methods.

== Conservation ==
In Hong Kong, Reeves's muntjac is a protected species under the Wild Animals Protection Ordinance Cap 170. It is listed as least concern by the IUCN due to being generally common and widespread.

== Economic significance ==
The tanned skin of Reeves's muntjac is notable for its softness and is occasionally used in beauty-care products, musical instruments, lenses, and antique items packaging. Low-fat muntjac meat is also noted for its culinary qualities.
