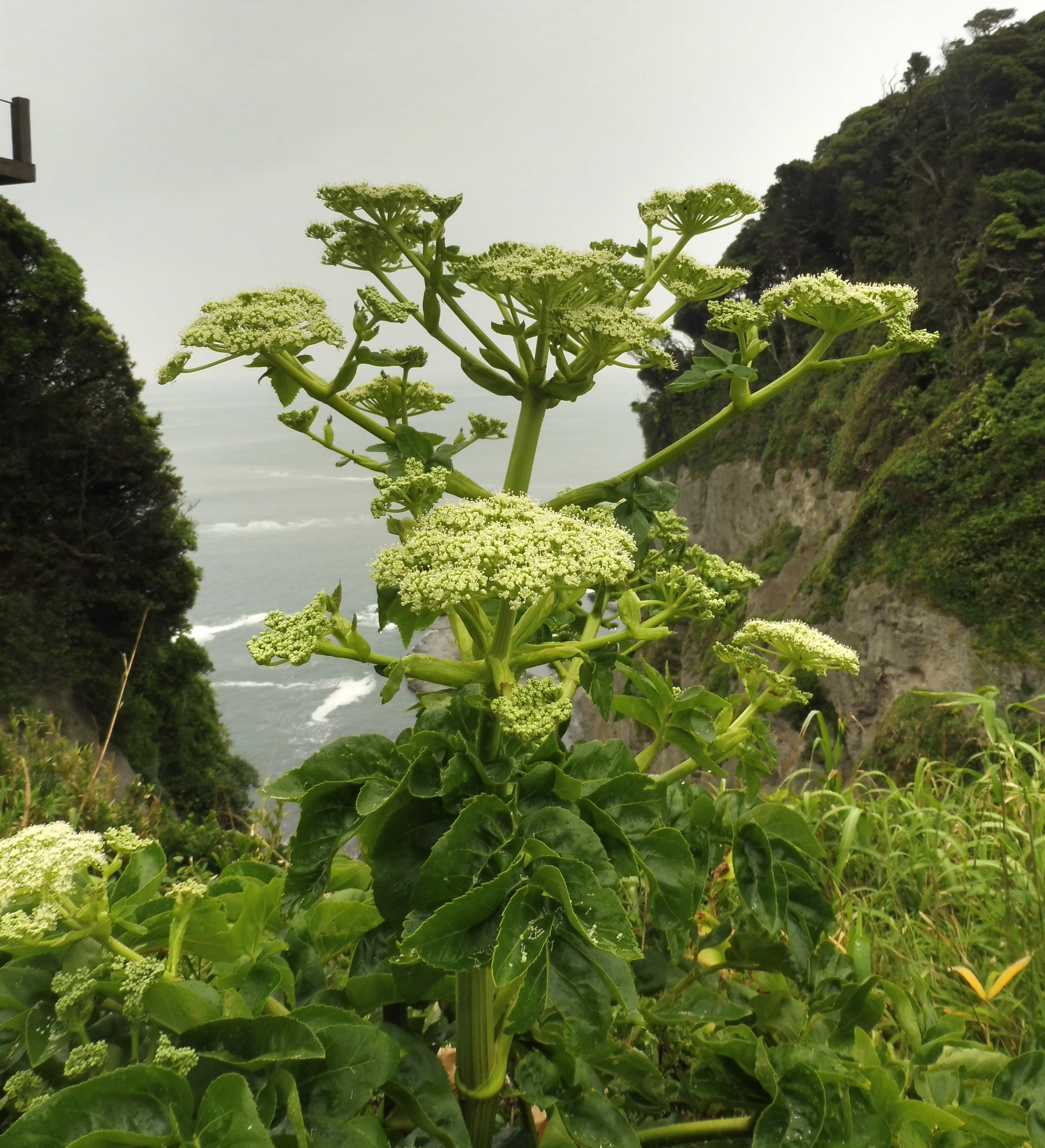

Scientific classification
- Kingdom: Plantae
- Clade: Tracheophytes
- Clade: Angiosperms
- Clade: Eudicots
- Clade: Asterids
- Order: Apiales
- Family: Apiaceae
- Genus: Angelica
- Species: A. japonica

Binomial name
- Angelica japonica A.Gray

= Angelica japonica =

Species of flowering plant

Angelica japonica is a species of flowering plant in the carrot family (Apiaceae). It is native to Japan, where it is found from the Kantō region westward to the island of Okinawa. Its natural habitat is along coastlines.

Angelica japonica is a tall species, reaching up to 1.5 meters in height. Its leaves are dark and lustrous on the upper surface. It produces umbels of white flowers in April through June.

It is similar to Angelica keiskei, but differs in several key features. Angelica japonica can be distinguished its red-striped stem, and leaves that are thicker with less coarse serration. In addition, Angelica keiskei does not produce its first flowers until late summer or fall.
