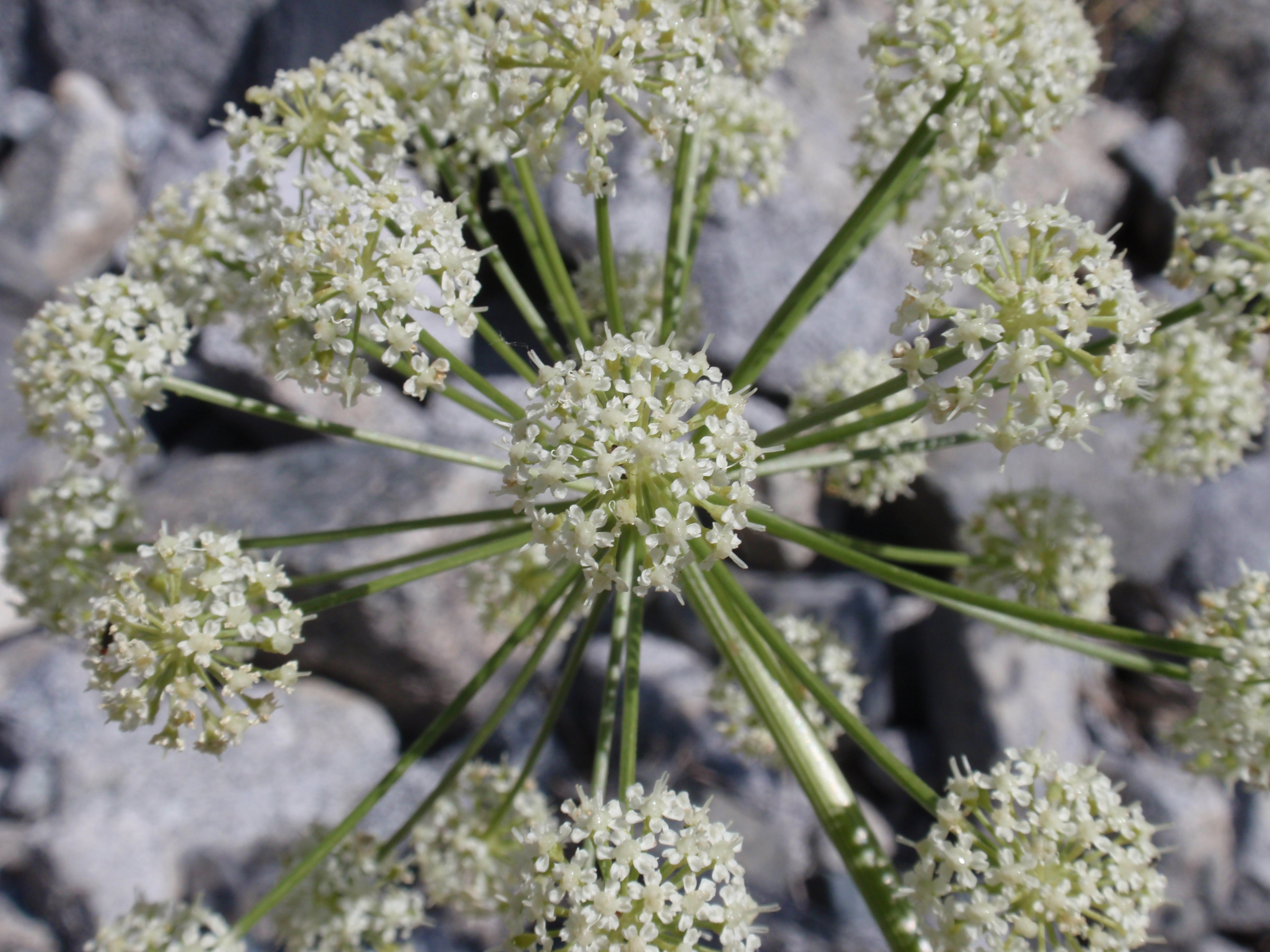

Scientific classification
- Kingdom: Plantae
- Clade: Tracheophytes
- Clade: Angiosperms
- Clade: Eudicots
- Clade: Asterids
- Order: Apiales
- Family: Apiaceae
- Genus: Angelica
- Species: A. lineariloba

Binomial name
- Angelica lineariloba A.Gray

= Angelica lineariloba =

Species of flowering plant

Angelica lineariloba is a species of Angelica known as poison angelica or Sierra angelica. It is native to the Sierra Nevada and nearby slopes and flats in California and western Nevada from 6000 to 10,600 ft in elevation. This is a taprooted perennial herb producing an erect, hollow stem up to about 1.5 meters tall. The large but feathery leaves are made up of many highly dissected leaflets which are linear to threadlike in shape. The inflorescence is a compound umbel with up to 40 rays holding clusters of small white to cream flowers. There are papery sheaths at the base of each petiole where it branches from the stem (see image at left). The plants overall are rather similar to the other large umbellifers cow parsnip and swamp whiteheads, but cow parsnips have huge lobed but undivided leaves, while swamp whiteheads have pinnate leaves and the individual flowerheads are dense, round balls.
