= Angelica glauca =

Conservation status
- Endangered (IUCN 3.1)

Scientific classification
- Kingdom: Plantae
- Clade: Tracheophytes
- Clade: Angiosperms
- Clade: Eudicots
- Clade: Asterids
- Order: Apiales
- Family: Apiaceae
- Genus: Angelica
- Species: A. glauca

Binomial name
- Angelica glauca Edgew.

Synonyms
- Angelica nuristanica Kitam.

Species of plant in the celery family

Angelica glauca, also known as Himalayan angelica, is a species of flowering plant in the family Apiaceae. It is found from eastern Afghanistan through the western Himalayas to western Tibet. It is noted for its medicinal and aromatic properties. A. glauca grows mainly in high-altitude areas and is cultivated for its value in traditional medicine, especially its roots and essential oil. Collecting in the wild for its essential oil has driven this species to endangered status.

== Description ==
A. glauca is a large, sturdy, tall herbaceous plant that can reach a height of 1–2 meters (3 ft 3 in – 6 ft 7 in). The stems are hollow and the plant flowers in clusters, with small white, yellow, or purple flowers arranged in an umbel, typical of the family Apiaceae. The roots are aromatic and succulent; and are commonly used medicinally for their anti-inflammatory, digestive, fever, headache, mental disorders, and respiratory properties. The plant is often recognized by its large size, distinctive flowers, and strong aroma.

== Distribution and habitat ==
A. glauca is native to the highland regions of the Himalayas, especially in countries such as India, Nepal, Bhutan, and Tibet. It typically grows at high altitudes, between 2,000 and 4,000 meters (6,600 and 13,100 ft) above sea level, where the temperatures are cool and the soil is moist and well-drained. The plant prefers cool climates and humus-rich soils. It typically grows in grasslands, forest edges, and along streams in its native areas, where there is little light or partial shade.

== Conservation ==
A. glauca is listed on the IUCN Red List as endangered due to overharvesting and loss of natural habitat. The plant's growing popularity for medicinal uses, coupled with climate change and agricultural expansion, has led to the decline of natural populations. Therefore, sustainable harvesting methods and conservation efforts are needed to protect the plant. Some areas have begun planting and controlled cultivation to reduce pressure on natural populations and ensure the plant's future survival.

== Cultivation ==
Growing A. glauca requires recreating the conditions of its natural highland habitat. The plant thrives in cool climates, with temperatures ranging from 10–15.5 °C (50.0–59.9 °F). The soil should be loose, well-drained, and humus-rich, with a neutral to slightly acidic pH (pH no higher than 7) and USDA hardiness zones 4–7. To propagate the plant, the seeds should be chilled before planting to break the dormancy. Sowing should begin in autumn or early spring (November or December). In addition, A. glauca needs constant moisture but should not be waterlogged as it is susceptible to root rot. The plant can tolerate shade but can also grow well in direct sunlight in cool climates.

== Uses ==
Angelica glauca is a plant in the family Apiaceae, native to the Himalayan mountain regions. The genus Angelica is an important medicinal plant used in traditional medicine to treat various diseases. Traditionally, A. glauca has been used to treat colds, bronchitis, flatulence, colic and stomachache. In addition, A. glauca was found to contain β-phellandrene, (Z)-ligustilide, methyl octane, limonene, β-pinene, α-phellandrene, β-pinene, thujene, β-caryophyllene, β-bisabolene, germacrene D with oxygenated terpenes such as trans-carveol, β-caryophyllene oxide.These are chemical components that have biological properties such as antioxidants, antibacterial, antifungal, and insecticides.
