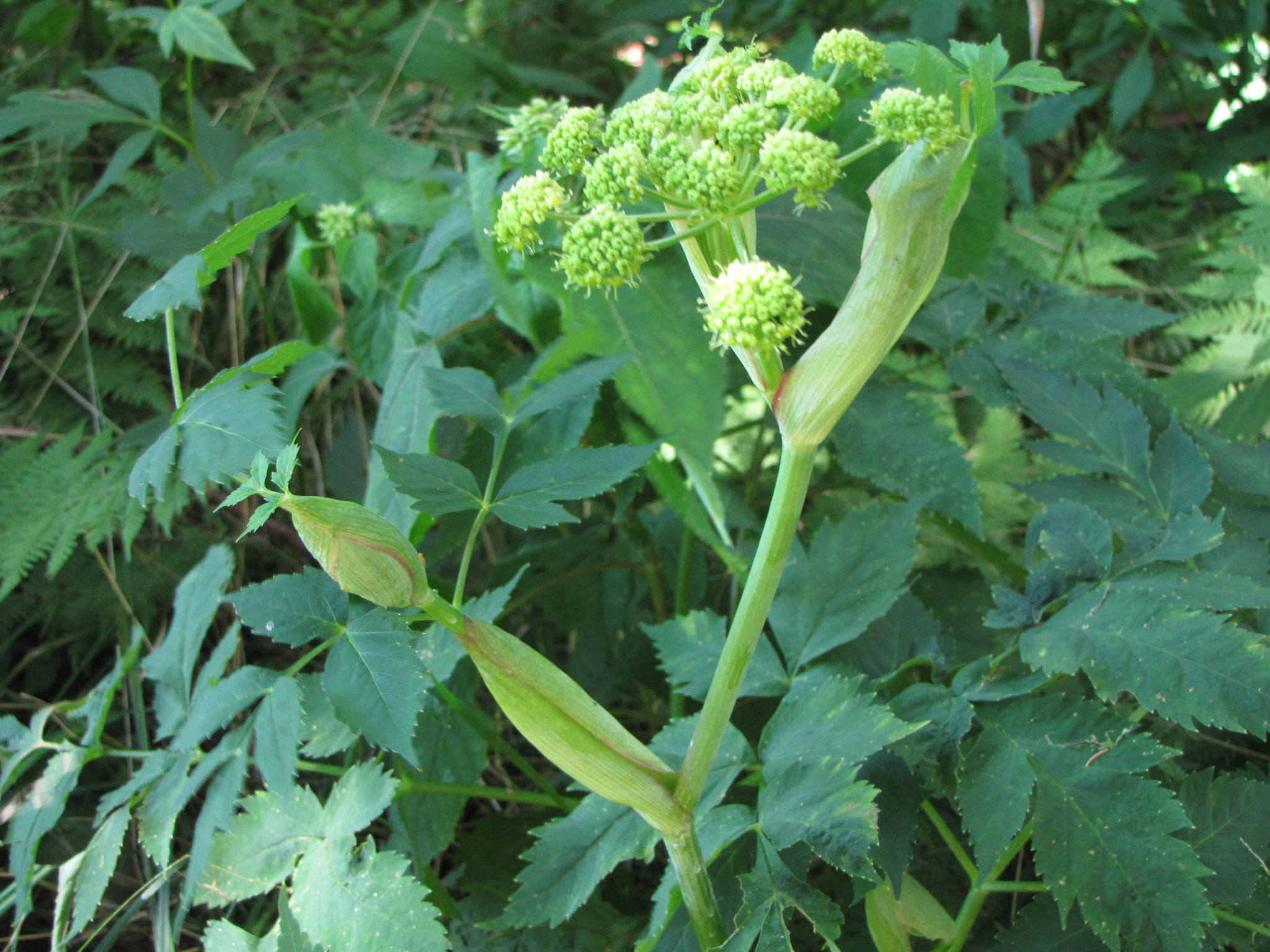

Scientific classification
- Kingdom: Plantae
- Clade: Tracheophytes
- Clade: Angiosperms
- Clade: Eudicots
- Clade: Asterids
- Order: Apiales
- Family: Apiaceae
- Genus: Angelica
- Species: A. triquinata

Binomial name
- Angelica triquinata Michx. (1803)
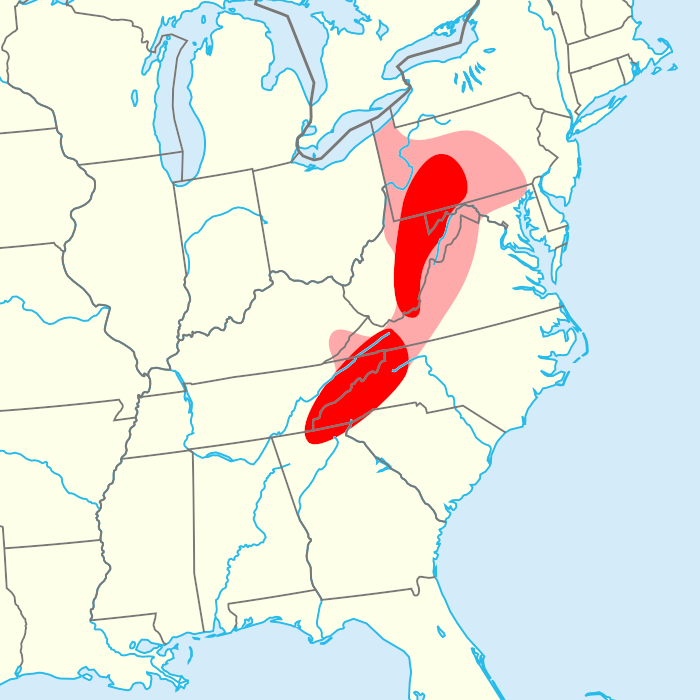
- General range of Angelica triquinata

Synonyms
- Angelica hirsuta Muhl. (1818); Oxypolis triquinata (Michx.) Raf. (1830); Pastinaca triquinata (Michx.) Spreng. (1818); Angelica curtisii Buckley (1843)

= Angelica triquinata =

Filmy angelica

Species of plant

Angelica triquinata, known by the common name of filmy angelica, is a member of the carrot family, Apiaceae. It is a perennial herb, native to the Appalachian Mountains in the eastern United States, from Georgia to Pennsylvania.
