= Angelica callii =

Conservation status
- Vulnerable (NatureServe)

Scientific classification
- Kingdom: Plantae
- Clade: Tracheophytes
- Clade: Angiosperms
- Clade: Eudicots
- Clade: Asterids
- Order: Apiales
- Family: Apiaceae
- Genus: Angelica
- Species: A. callii

Binomial name
- Angelica callii Mathias & Constance

Species of flowering plant

Angelica callii is an uncommon species of angelica known as Call's angelica. It is endemic to the Sierra Nevada of California, where it grows by forest streams.

This is a taprooted perennial herb producing a rough, hollow, erect stem to heights between 1 and 2 meters. The leaves are made up of highly dissected toothed leaflets each up to 13 centimeters. The inflorescence is a compound umbel with up to 50 rays bearing clusters of hairy flowers.
