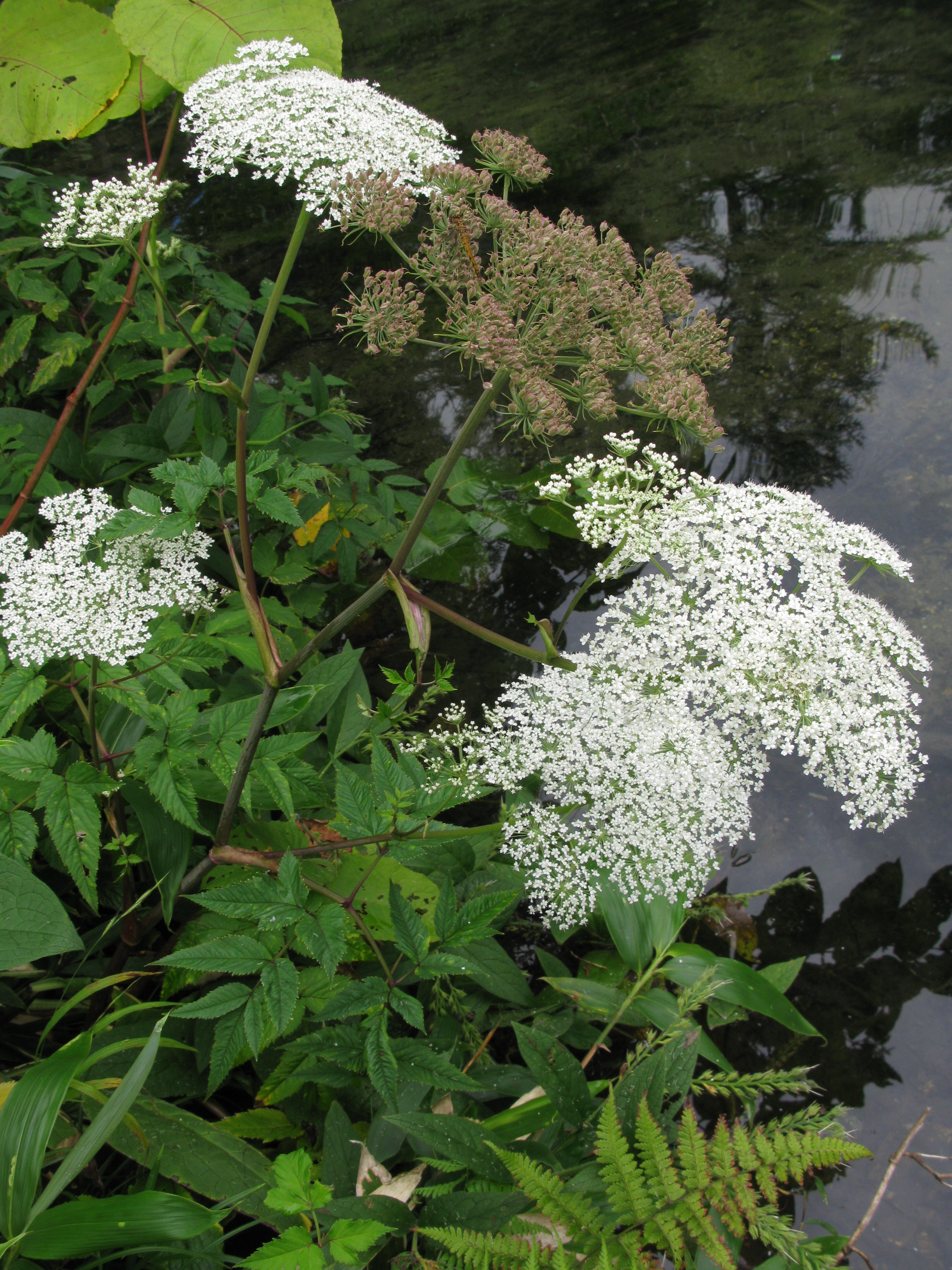

Scientific classification
- Kingdom: Plantae
- Clade: Embryophytes
- Clade: Tracheophytes
- Clade: Spermatophytes
- Clade: Angiosperms
- Clade: Eudicots
- Clade: Asterids
- Order: Apiales
- Family: Apiaceae
- Genus: Angelica
- Species: A. genuflexa

Binomial name
- Angelica genuflexa Nutt.

= Angelica genuflexa =

Species of flowering plant

Angelica genuflexa is a species of angelica known as kneeling angelica. It is native to northwestern North America from Alaska to northern California, where it grows in moist areas in coniferous forests such as streambanks. This is a taprooted perennial herb producing an erect, hollow stem to heights between 1 and 2 meters. The leaves are up to 80 centimeters long and are made up of many dissected, toothed leaflets, each up to 10 centimeters long. The inflorescence is a compound umbel of up to 50 rays bearing clusters of small flowers.
