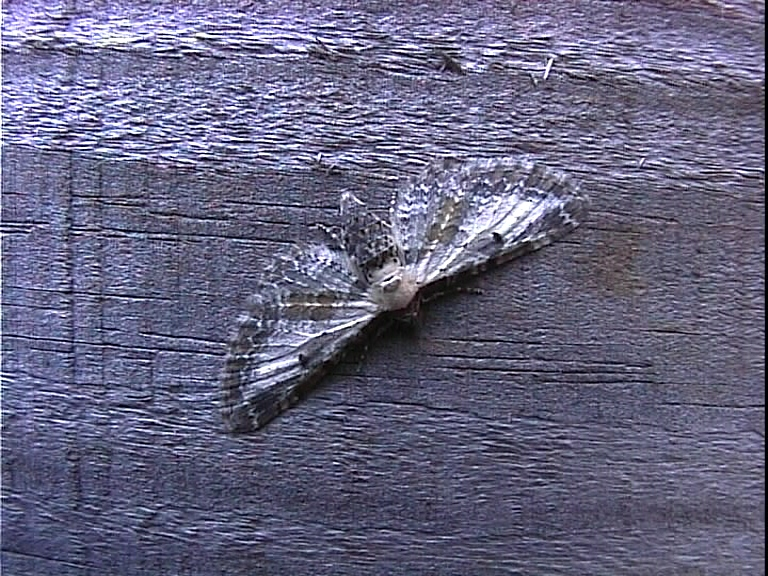

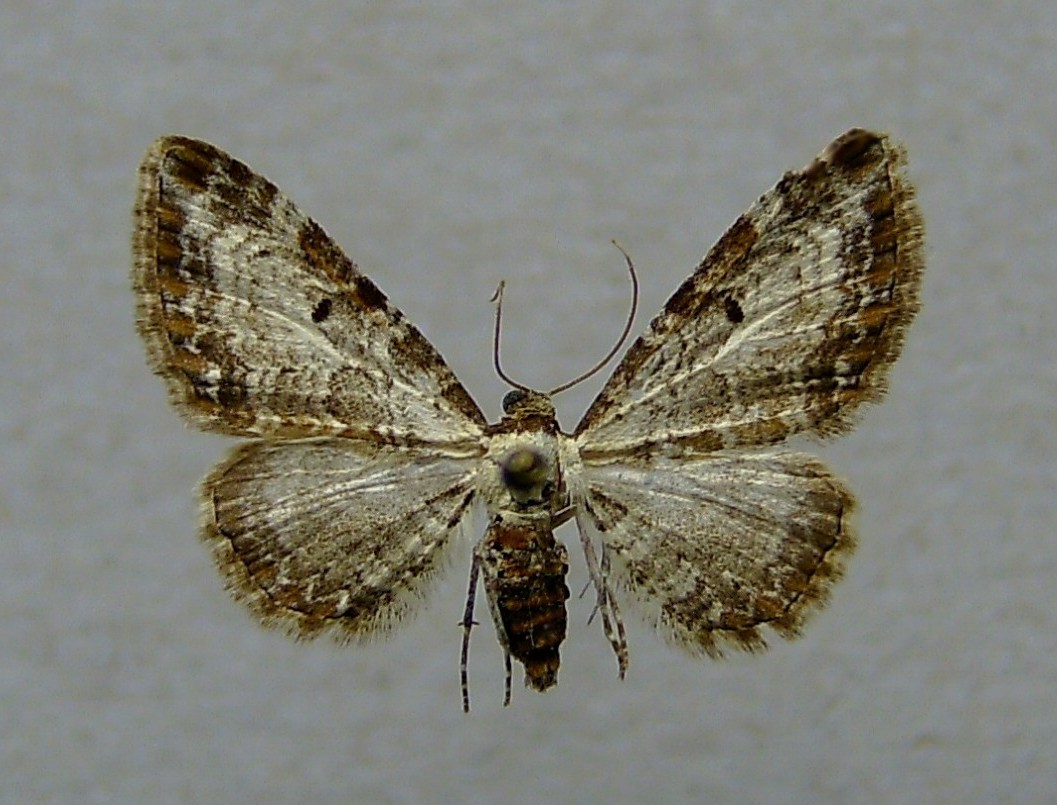

Scientific classification
- Kingdom: Animalia
- Phylum: Arthropoda
- Class: Insecta
- Order: Lepidoptera
- Family: Geometridae
- Genus: Eupithecia
- Species: E. succenturiata

Binomial name
- Eupithecia succenturiata (Linnaeus, 1758)

Synonyms
- Phalaena succenturiata Linnaeus, 1758; Geometra disparata Hubner, 1799; Tephroclystia exalbidata Staudinger, 1901

= Bordered pug =

Species of moth

The bordered pug (Eupithecia succenturiata) is a moth of the family Geometridae. It is found across the Palearctic region. In the Pyrenees, the species can be found up to an altitude of 1800 metres. It prefers steppe areas, open bushy terrain, fallow and unimproved grasslands and parkland.

== Description ==
This is an easily recognisable species, mainly due to the combination of colours and its large size relative to most other pugs (wingspan 21–24 mm). Typically this moth has whitish forewings with broad dark grey margins or suffused with brown margins. It is very variable, however, and can be nearly all white or nearly all grey. There is a small dark-coloured discal spot. The hindwings are similar in colour with a small discal spot. The abdomen is conspicuously patterned. It is grey, with a white base. The larva is light brown with numerous, small white warts scattered throughout the body. It has a narrow white lateral stripe and a variety of diamond-shaped brown spots along the back.

== Biology ==
The species flies at night from early June to late August and is attracted to light.

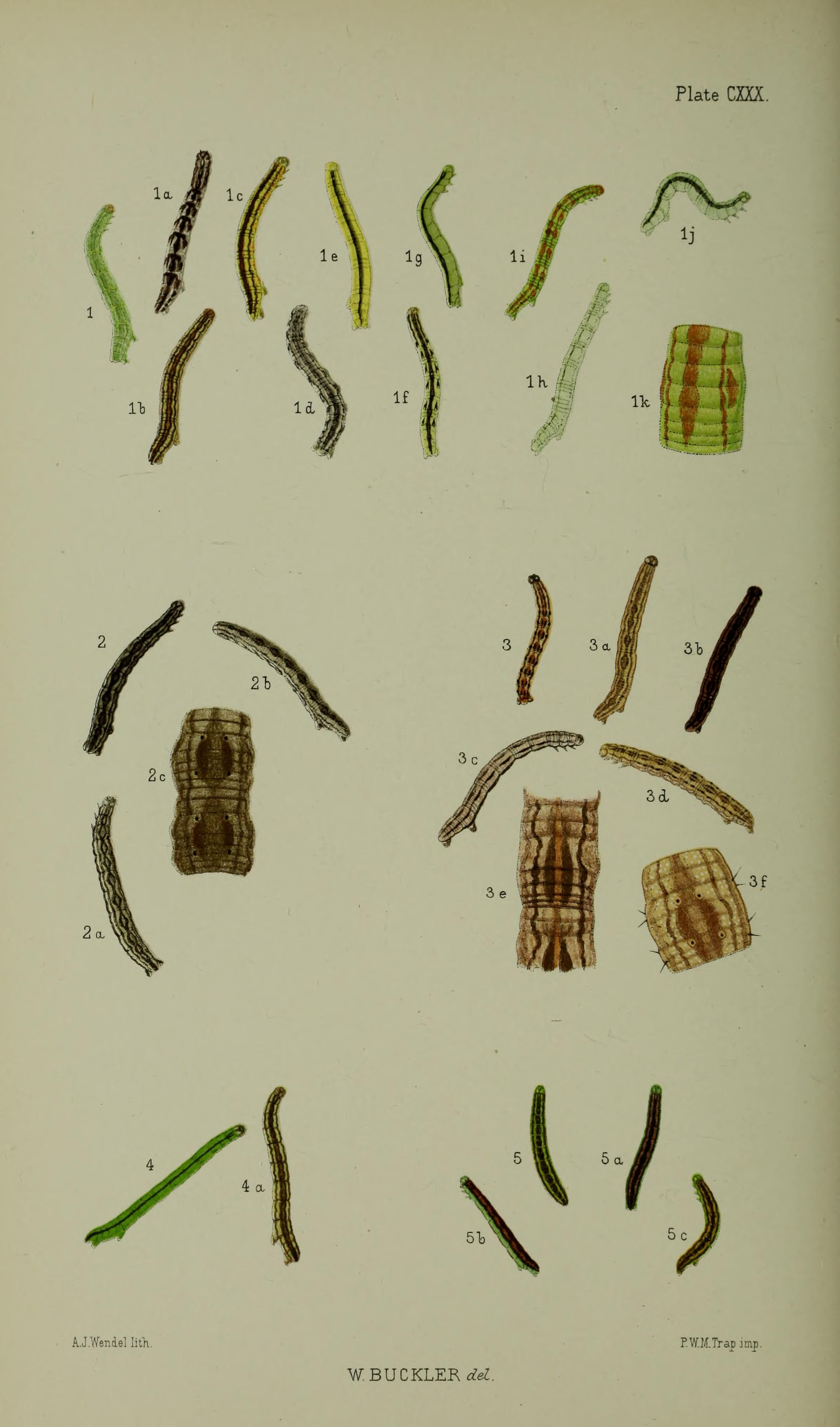
Figs 2,2a,2b larvae after final moult 2c enlarged detail of segments

The larva feeds on the foliage of mugwort, although it has also been recorded feeding on Angelica, bilberry, tansy and yarrow. The species overwinters as a pupa.
