= Angelica morii =

Scientific classification
- Kingdom: Plantae
- Clade: Tracheophytes
- Clade: Angiosperms
- Clade: Eudicots
- Clade: Asterids
- Order: Apiales
- Family: Apiaceae
- Genus: Angelica
- Species: A. morii

Binomial name
- Angelica morii Hayata

Species of plant

Angelica morii is a species of plant native to South Central China and Taiwan.

== Description ==
It is a perennial plant that grows in the temperate biome and grows from 50 cm to 100 cm. The root is conic and brown.
