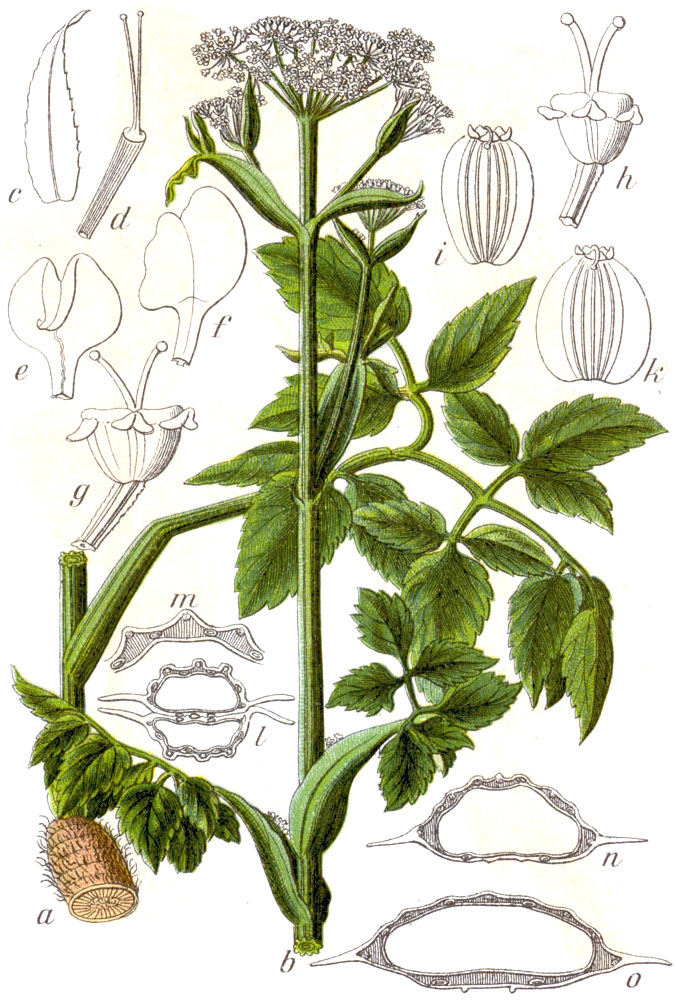

Scientific classification
- Kingdom: Plantae
- Clade: Tracheophytes
- Clade: Angiosperms
- Clade: Eudicots
- Clade: Asterids
- Order: Apiales
- Family: Apiaceae
- Genus: Angelica
- Species: A. palustris

Binomial name
- Angelica palustris (Besser) Hoffm.

Synonyms
- Ostericum palustre (Besser) Besser; Angelica pratensis M.Bieb. ex Besser; Gomphopetalum albiflorum Turcz.; Imperatoria palustris Besser; Ostericum palustre (Besser) Besser; Ostericum pratense Hoffm.; Selinum ostericum E.H.L.Krause.

= Angelica palustris =

Species of flowering plant

Angelica palustris (syn. Ostericum palustre), commonly known as marsh angelica, is a biennial or a perennial plant species from the family Apiaceae.

It can grow up to 1.2 meter tall. It has bipinnate leaves, meaning arranged opposite each other in rows. The leaves are ovate shaped with scalloped edges. The white compound umbel flowers bloom from July to August and are five petalled. It has achenes as fruit.

The plant is native to Europe, such as Yugoslavia (Serbia and Montenegro) and central Asia, Siberia.

It prefers to grow in a wide variety of soils, from loamy, sand and clay soils and can tolerate a sunny or half shady position.

The species epithet palustris is Latin for "of the marsh" and indicates its common habitat.

The species was first described and published by Georg Franz Hoffmann in Gen. Pl. Umbell. on page 162 in 1814.

== Conservation status ==
This plant occurs in Eastern Europe, and Western Asia, and it is rare and threatened throughout its range. Populations of the plant are generally small and reduced in number, mainly due to habitat loss, and exhibit a marked reduction in genetic diversity. Owing to its Europe-wide conservation status, this plant has been included in the Bern Convention, and subsequently listed in Annex II of the EU Flora–Fauna Directive—Natura 2000.
