= Angelica californica =

Scientific classification
- Kingdom: Plantae
- Clade: Tracheophytes
- Clade: Angiosperms
- Clade: Eudicots
- Clade: Asterids
- Order: Apiales
- Family: Apiaceae
- Genus: Angelica
- Species: A. californica

Binomial name
- Angelica californica Jeps.

Species of plant

Angelica californica is a species of angelica known as California angelica. It is found in northern California and occasionally in southern Oregon. Its habitats are the dry, low-elevation slopes of the foothills and coast ranges. It bears umbels of white angelica flowers.
