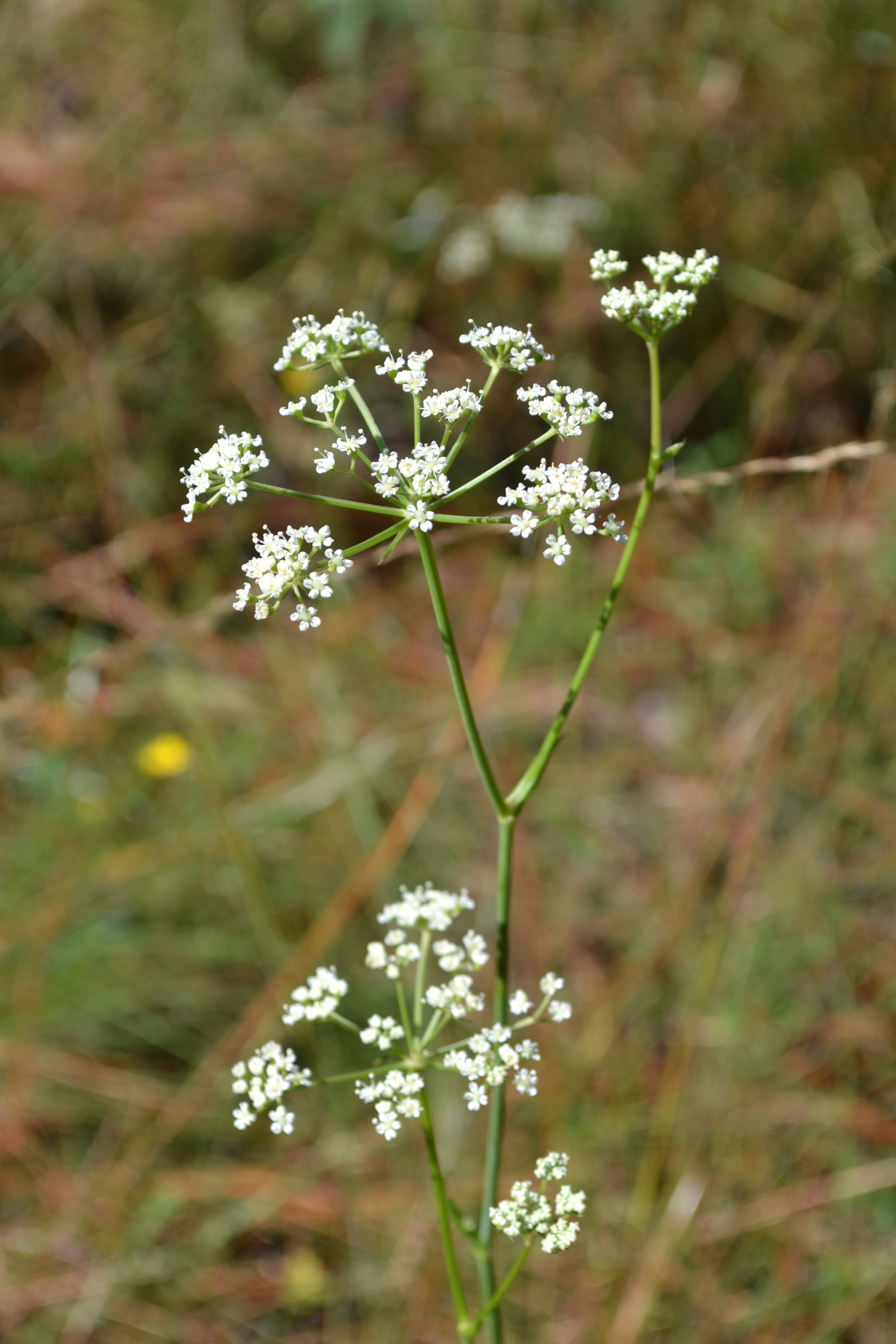
- Angelica dentata flowering

Conservation status
- Imperiled (NatureServe)

Scientific classification
- Kingdom: Plantae
- Clade: Tracheophytes
- Clade: Angiosperms
- Clade: Eudicots
- Clade: Asterids
- Order: Apiales
- Family: Apiaceae
- Genus: Angelica
- Species: A. dentata

Binomial name
- Angelica dentata J.M.Coult. & Rose

= Angelica dentata =

Species of flowering plant

Angelica dentata, the coastal plain angelica, is a species of perennial herb found in parts of the southeastern United States. A. dentata can be found in the states of Georgia, Florida, and Alabama. It occurs most commonly in upland pineland communities and tends to be restricted to native groundcover.

The stems of A. dentata may grow between 50 and 100 centimetres (20 and 39 inches) in height. Leaves are positioned on long leaf stalks, divided into leaflets. The flowers grow in clusters of 5 to 12 smaller groups of flowers, which are small and white in color. Each flower has 5 petals. A. dentata's fruits are long and oval in shape, ranging from 5 to 6 millimetres (0.20 to 0.24 inches).
