= Angelica adzharica =

Adjarian angelica

Conservation status
- Endangered (IUCN 3.1)

Scientific classification
- Kingdom: Plantae
- Clade: Tracheophytes
- Clade: Angiosperms
- Clade: Eudicots
- Clade: Asterids
- Order: Apiales
- Family: Apiaceae
- Genus: Angelica
- Species: A. adzharica

Binomial name
- Angelica adzharica Pimenov

Species of flowering plant

Angelica adzharica, the Adjarian angelica is a species of angelica in the carrot family that is endemic to Adjara in Georgia. It can be found in meadows and subalpine tall herb communities, in montane and subalpine zones between 700 and 2,300 m elevation. It is threatened by overgrazing and hay making.
