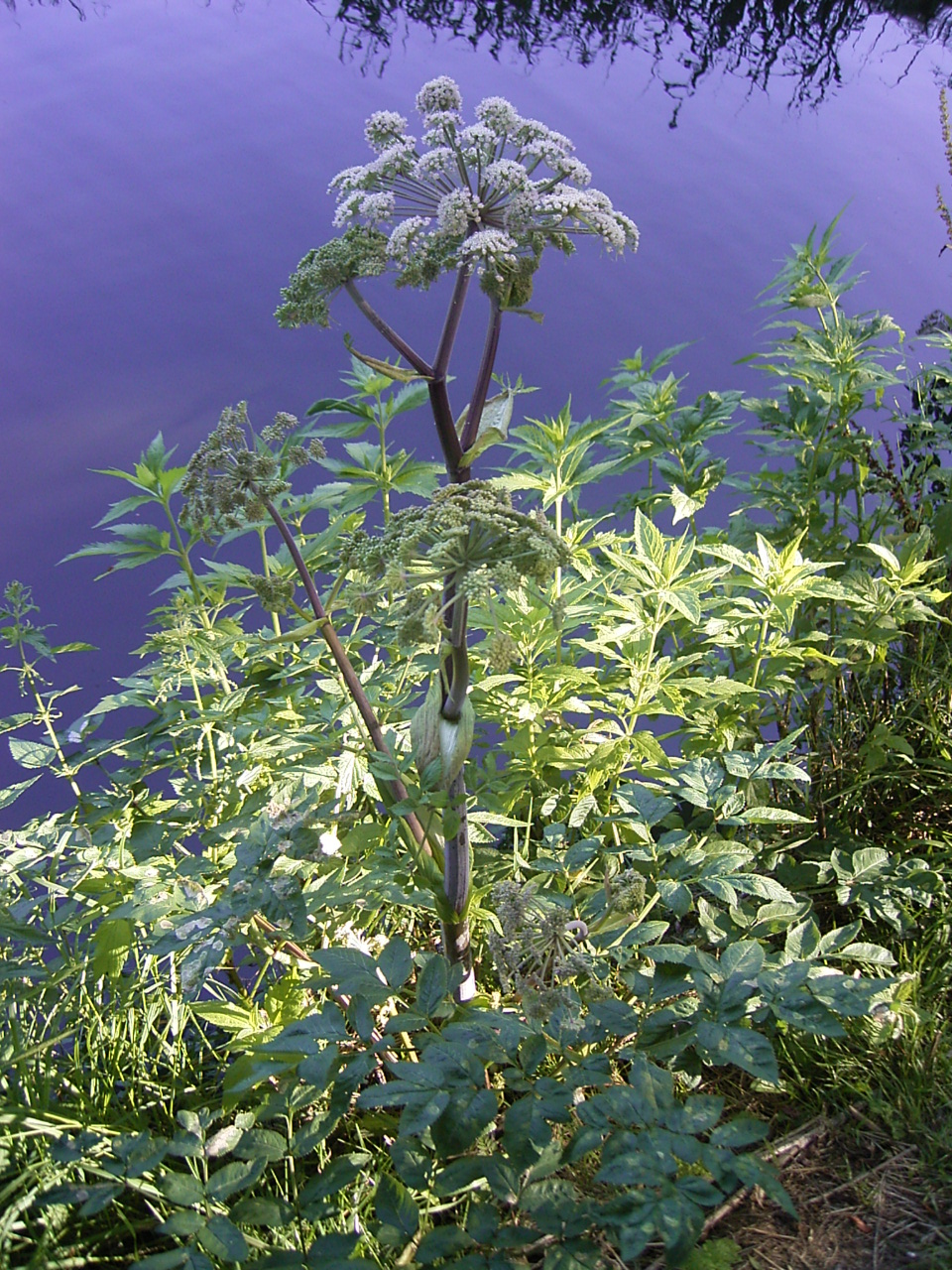
- Wild angelica (Angelica sylvestris)

Scientific classification
- Kingdom: Plantae
- Clade: Tracheophytes
- Clade: Angiosperms
- Clade: Eudicots
- Clade: Asterids
- Order: Apiales
- Family: Apiaceae
- Subfamily: Apioideae
- Tribe: Selineae
- Genus: Angelica; L.

Species
- About 90 species; see text.

Synonyms
- Agathorhiza Raf.; Angelocarpa Rupr.; Angelophyllum Rupr.; Archangelica Wolf; Callisace Fisch. ex Hoffm.; Coelopleurum Ledeb.; Czernaevia Turcz. ex Ledeb.; Gomphopetalum Turcz.; Halosciastrum Koidz.; Homopteryx Kitag.; Physolophium Turcz.; Porphyroscias Miq.; Razulia Raf.; Rompelia Koso-Pol.; Sphenosciadium A.Gray

= Angelica =

Genus of flowering plants

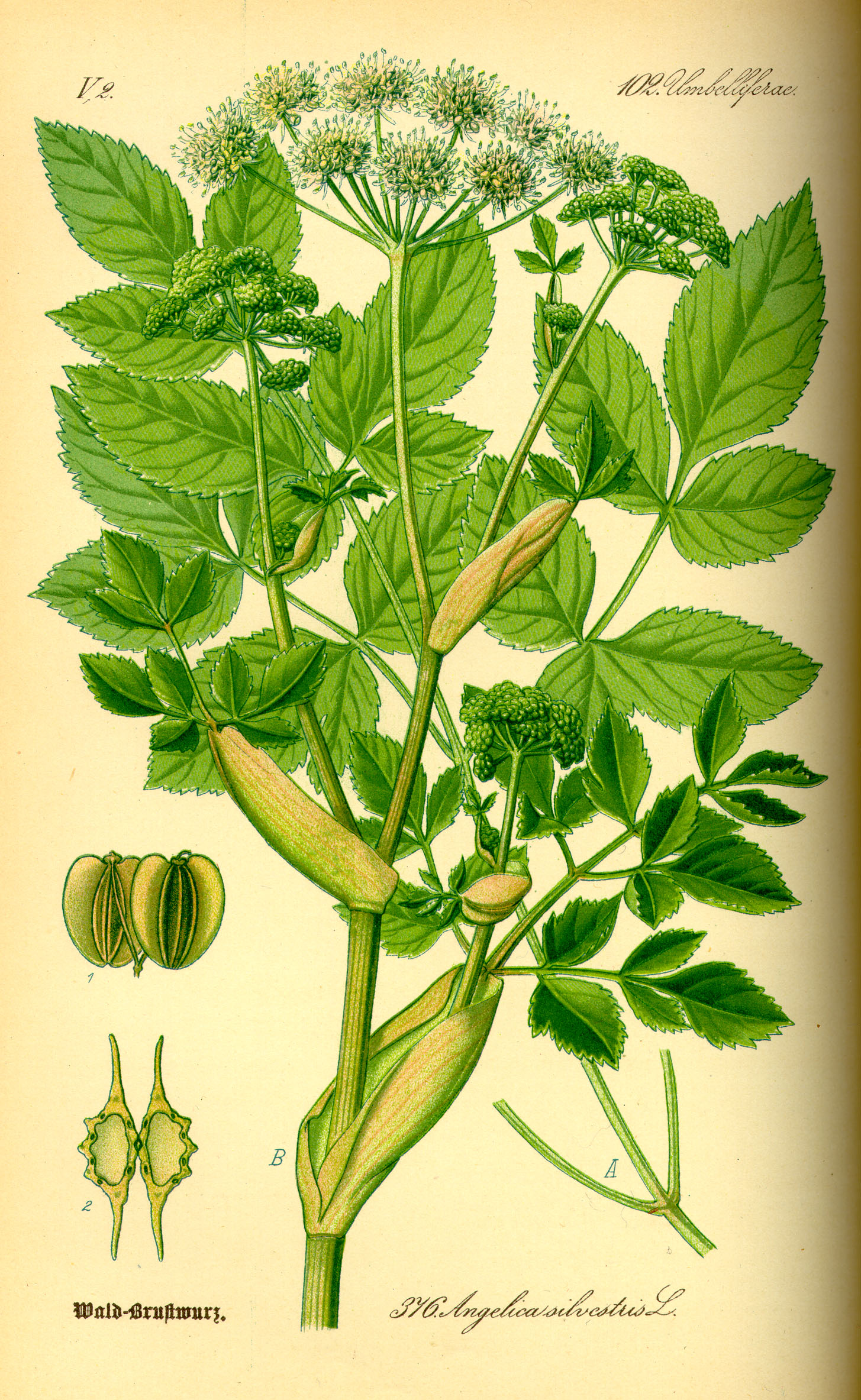
Wild angelica (Angelica sylvestris) from Thomé, Flora von Deutschland, Österreich und der Schweiz 1885

Angelica is a genus of about 90 species of tall biennial and perennial herbs in the family Apiaceae, native to temperate and subarctic regions of the Northern Hemisphere, reaching as far north as Iceland, Sápmi, and Greenland. They grow to 1–3 m (3 ft 3 in – 9 ft 10 in) tall, with large bipinnate leaves and large compound umbels of white or greenish-white flowers. It shows variations in fruit anatomy, leaf morphology, and subterranean structures. The genes are extremely polymorphic.

Some species can be found in purple moor and rush pastures.

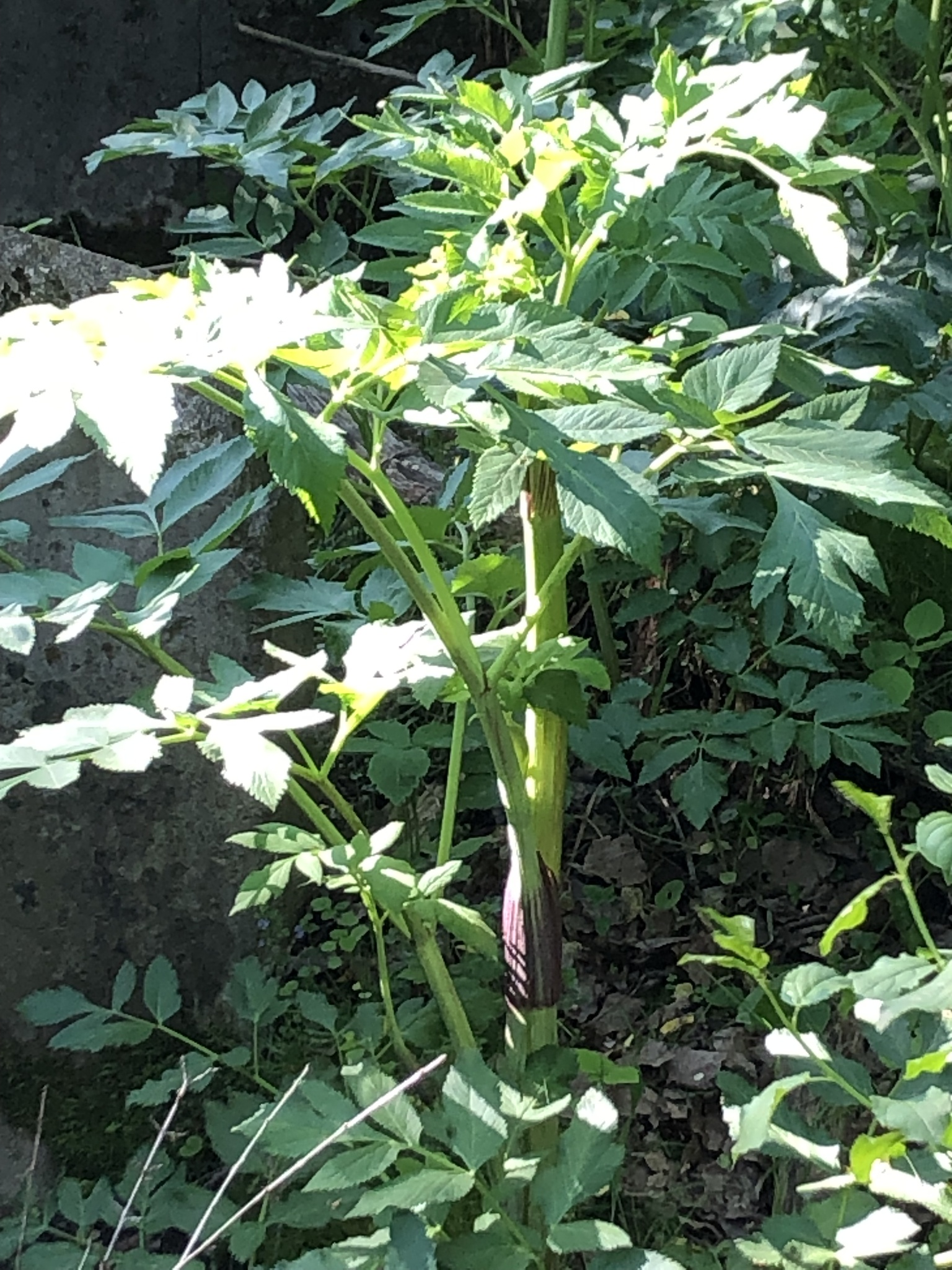
Purple-stemmed Angelica (Angelica atropurpurea) found near Winona, MN, USA. The plant is seen here where it was growing near a creek.

== Characteristics ==
Angelica species grow to 1–3 m (3 ft 3 in – 9 ft 10 in) tall, with large bipinnate leaves and large compound umbels of white or greenish-white flowers. Their large, sparkling, starburst flowers are pollinated by a great variety of insects (the generalist pollination syndrome), the floral scents are species-specific, and even specific to particular subspecies. The active ingredients of angelica are found in the roots and rhizomes and contains furocoumarins in its tissues, which make the skin sensitive to light.

== Cladistic classification ==
Molecular phylogenetic analyses have identified four major clades:

Archangelica clade
which includes the type species Angelica archangelica and North American species such as A. atropurpurea.
Eurasian Angelica clade
containing primarily Eurasian species and the Pacific Coast species A. genuflexa.
North American Angelica clade
comprising approximately twenty species native to North America, including A. arguta and A. californica. North American species traditionally assigned to Angelica do not form a single evolutionary lineage, are polyphyletic and require taxonomic revision.
PENA clade
acronym for the genera Perideridia, Eulophus, Neoparrya, and Angelica, and represented by A. dawsonii, which was found to be more closely related to other genera within the Apiaceae.

== Species ==
List of species accepted by Plants of the World Online as of September 2025:

- Angelica acutiloba
- Angelica adzharica – Adjarian angelica
- Angelica ampla – giant angelica
- Angelica angelicastrum – Norwegian angelica (Note: Accepted by PoWO, but considered a synonym of Angelica major by GBIF.)
- Angelica anomala – anomalous angelica
- Angelica apaensis
- Angelica archangelica – garden angelica, archangel, angelique
- Angelica arguta – sharp-toothed angelica, Lyall's angelica
- Angelica atropurpurea – purplestem angelica, alexanders, American angelica, masterwort
- Angelica biserrata – heavy-toothed angelica
- Angelica brevicaulis – short-stem angelica
- Angelica breweri – Brewer's angelica
- Angelica californica – California angelica
- Angelica callii – Call's angelica
- Angelica canbyi – Canby's angelica
- Angelica capitellata – Ranger buttons
- Angelica cartilaginomarginata
- Angelica cincta – Hubei angelica
- Angelica cryptotaeniifolia
- Angelica cyclocarpa – Nepalese angelica
- Angelica czernaevia – Eastern Siberian angelica, parsley angelica
- Angelica dabashanensis
- Angelica dahurica – Chinese angelica, garden angelica, wild angelica
- Angelica dailingensis
- Angelica dawsonii – Dawson's angelica
- Angelica decurrens – descending angelica
- Angelica decursiva
- Angelica dentata – coastalplain angelica
- Angelica duclouxii – DuCloux's angelica
- Angelica edulis
- Angelica genuflexa – kneeling angelica
- Angelica gigas
- Angelica glauca
- Angelica gmelinii – Gmelin's angelica, Okhostk angelica
- Angelica grayi – Gray's angelica
- Angelica hakonensis – Hakone angelica
- Angelica hendersonii – Henderson's angelica
- Angelica heterocarpa – variable-fruit angelica
- Angelica inaequalis – unequal angelica
- Angelica indica – Indian angelica
- Angelica japonica – Japanese angelica
- Angelica kaghanica
- Angelica kangdingensis
- Angelica keiskei
- Angelica kingii – King's angelica
- Angelica komarovii
- Angelica laxifoliata
- Angelica lignescens
- Angelica likiangensis
- Angelica lineariloba – poison angelica
- Angelica longeradiata
- Angelica longicaudata
- Angelica longipes
- Angelica lucida – seacoast angelica
- Angelica major
- Angelica maowenensis
- Angelica megaphylla
- Angelica minamitanii
- Angelica mixta
- Angelica morii
- Angelica morrisonicola
- Angelica muliensis
- Angelica multicaulis
- Angelica multisecta
- Angelica nakaiana
- Angelica nelsonii
- Angelica nitida
- Angelica nubigena
- Angelica oreada
- Angelica pachycarpa – Portuguese angelica
- Angelica paeoniifolia
- Angelica palustris – marsh angelica
- Angelica pinnata – small-leaf angelica
- Angelica pinnatiloba
- Angelica polymorpha
- Angelica pseudoselinum
- Angelica pseudoshikokiana
- Angelica pubescens
- Angelica pyrenaea
- Angelica razulii
- Angelica roseana – rose angelica
- Angelica saxatilis
- Angelica saxicola
- Angelica scabrida – Charleston Mountain angelica, rough angelica
- Angelica setchuenensis
- Angelica shikokiana
- Angelica sinanomontana
- Angelica sinensis
- Angelica sylvestris – wild angelica
- Angelica tarokoensis
- Angelica tenuisecta
- Angelica tenuissima – Korean gobon, slender angelica
- Angelica ternata
- Angelica tianmuensis
- Angelica tomentosa – woolly angelica
- Angelica triquinata – filmy angelica, mountain angelica
- Angelica turcica
- Angelica ubadakensis
- Angelica ursina – ezo angelica, ezo nyū
- Angelica urumiensis
- Angelica valida
- Angelica venenosa – hairy angelica
- Angelica viridiflora
- Angelica wheeleri – Utah angelica
- Angelica yakusimensis
- Angelica yanyuanensis

== Cultivation and uses ==
Some species are grown as flavouring agents or for their medicinal properties. The most notable of these is garden angelica (A. archangelica), which is commonly known simply as angelica. Crystallized strips of young angelica stems and midribs are green in colour and are sold as decorative and flavoursome cake decoration material, but may also be enjoyed on their own. The roots and seeds are commonly used to flavour gin. Its presence accounts for the distinct flavour of many liqueurs, such as Chartreuse. Angelica roots are used in perfumery as a plant analogue of musk.

Seacoast angelica (A. lucida) has been eaten as a wild version of celery.

A. sylvestris and some other species are eaten by the larvae of some Lepidoptera species, including bordered pug, grey pug, lime-speck pug and the V-pug.

=== Asia ===
The plant is known as 当归 and a remedy for hangovers in traditional Chinese medicine. The radix of Angelica dahurica is widely used as an herbal remedy in traditional Chinese medicine and is known as bai zhi. In Korean medicine, its name is baek-ji.

In parts of Japan, especially the Izu Islands, the shoots and leaves of ashitaba (A. keiskei) are eaten as tempura, particularly in the spring.

=== Europe ===
Natives of Sápmi use the fleshy roots as food and the stalks as medicine. Among the Sami people of Lapland, the plant is used to make a traditional musical instrument the fadno.

=== North America ===
A. dawsonii was used by several first nations in North America for ritual purposes.

A. atropurpurea is found in North America from Newfoundland west to Wisconsin and south to Maryland, and was smoked by Missouri tribes for colds and respiratory ailments. This species is very similar in appearance to the poisonous water hemlock.

A. lucida root was regarded as preventive medicine by the Aleut of St. Lawrence Island, whom consumed small pieces of the root daily to treat illness and malaise.
