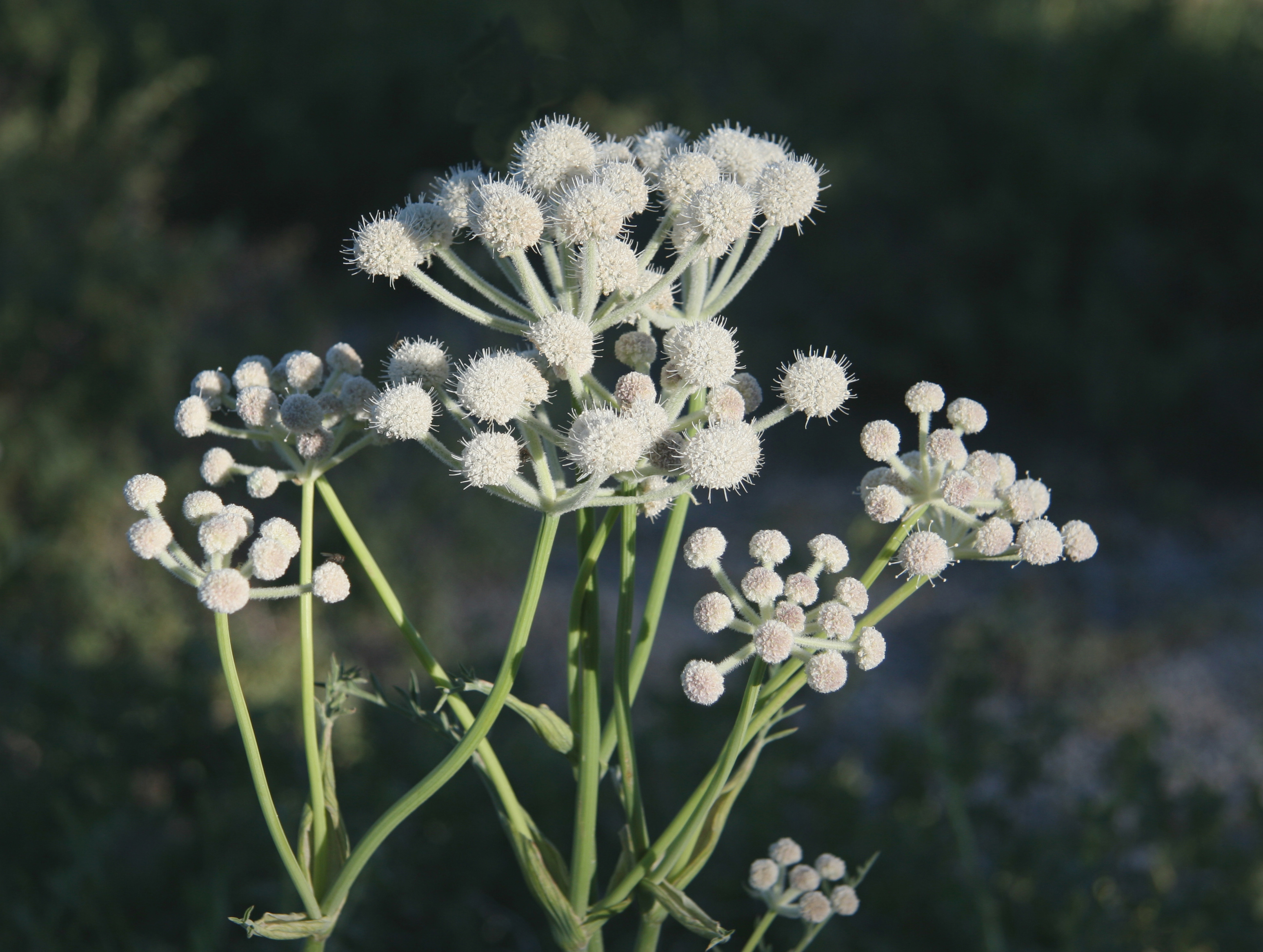

Scientific classification
- Kingdom: Plantae
- Clade: Tracheophytes
- Clade: Angiosperms
- Clade: Eudicots
- Clade: Asterids
- Order: Apiales
- Family: Apiaceae
- Genus: Angelica
- Species: A. capitellata

Binomial name
- Angelica capitellata (A.Gray) Spalik, Reduron & S.R.Downie

Synonyms
- Selinum capitellatum (A.Gray) Benth. & Hook.f. ex S.Watson; Sphenosciadium capitellatum A.Gray; Selinum capitellatum var. scabrum Munz; Selinum eryngiifolium Greene; Selinum validum Congdon; Sphenosciadium eryngiifolium (Greene) J.M.Coult. & Rose

= Angelica capitellata =

Species of flowering plant

Angelica capitellata, synonym Sphenosciadium capitellatum, is a species of flowering plant in the family Apiaceae. When treated as Sphenosciadium capitellatum, it was the only species in the monotypic genus Sphenosciadium. It is known by the common names woollyhead parsnip, ranger's buttons, button parsley, and swamp white heads.

== Description ==
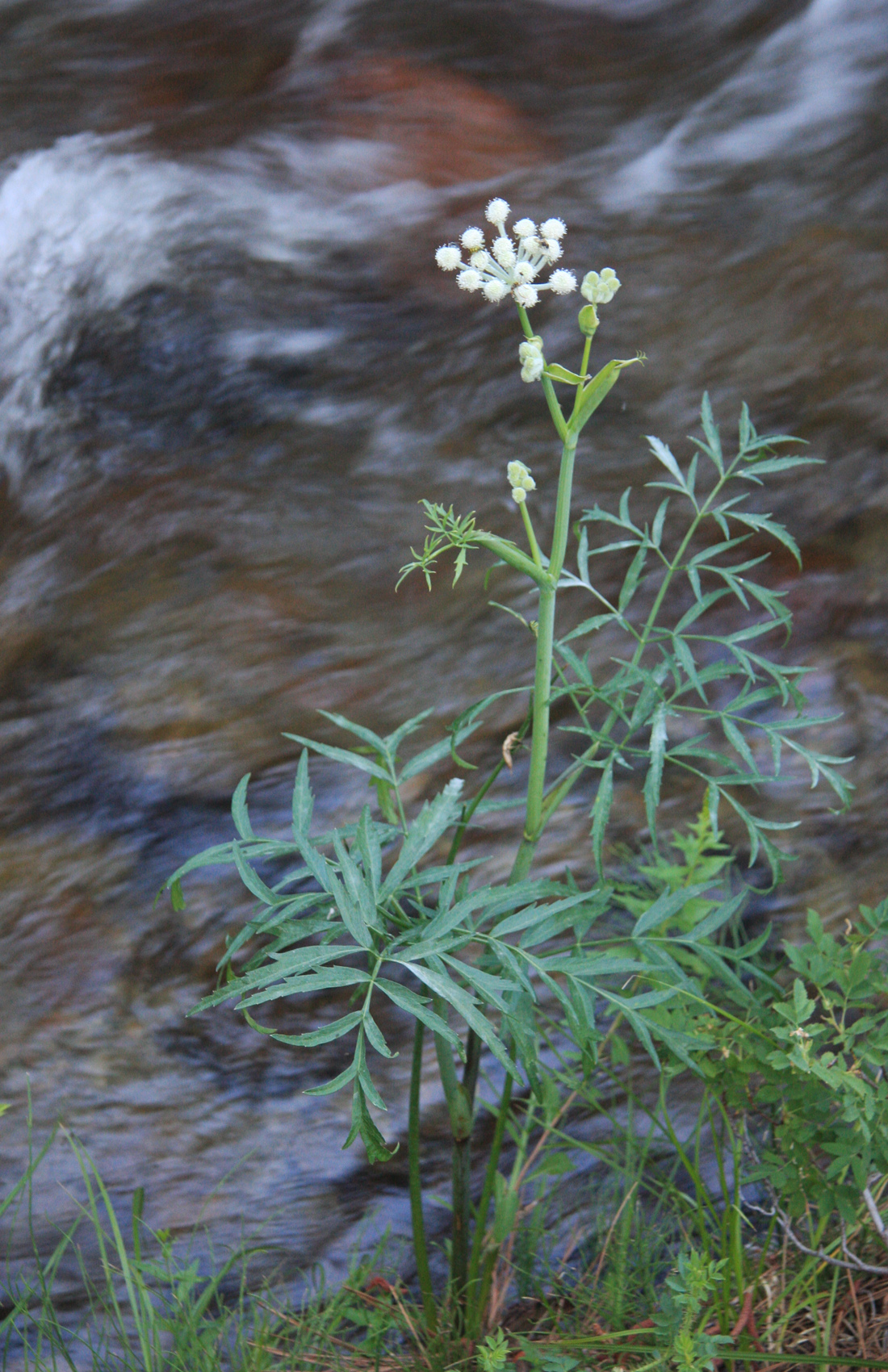
Doubly pinnate leaves of foliage

It is a stout perennial herb growing from a tuberous root and producing an erect stem often exceeding 1 meter (3 1/2 feet) tall and sometimes reaching 2.1 m (7 ft) overall. The stem and leaves are usually green but sometimes nearly white in color, smooth below but with rough hairs on the inflorescence. The leaves are 10–40 centimeters (4–15 1/2 inches) long and divided into several segments which bear widely spaced leaflets. The leaflets may also be intricately divided into small segments.

The inflorescence is a whitish compound umbel about 10 cm (4 in) across, with many branches. It blooms from July to August. The nearly spherical, headlike terminal umbellets contain many tiny white or purple-tinged flowers, whose protruding stamens make them appear very fuzzy in full bloom, as for the central umbels in the top right image.

== Distribution and habitat ==
The plant is native to western North America from eastern Oregon and central Idaho through Nevada and southern California, reaching into Baja California. It grows in moist habitat types, such as creeksides and meadows.

Ranger's buttons plants are quite similar to the other large Umbelliferae that share similar habitats: Sierra angelica and cow parsnip, but each has a very differently shaped leaf, and the other two have umbellets with quite distinct flowers, in contrast to the tight balls on ranger's buttons.

== Toxicity ==
The species is included in Toxic Plants of North America (2001).
