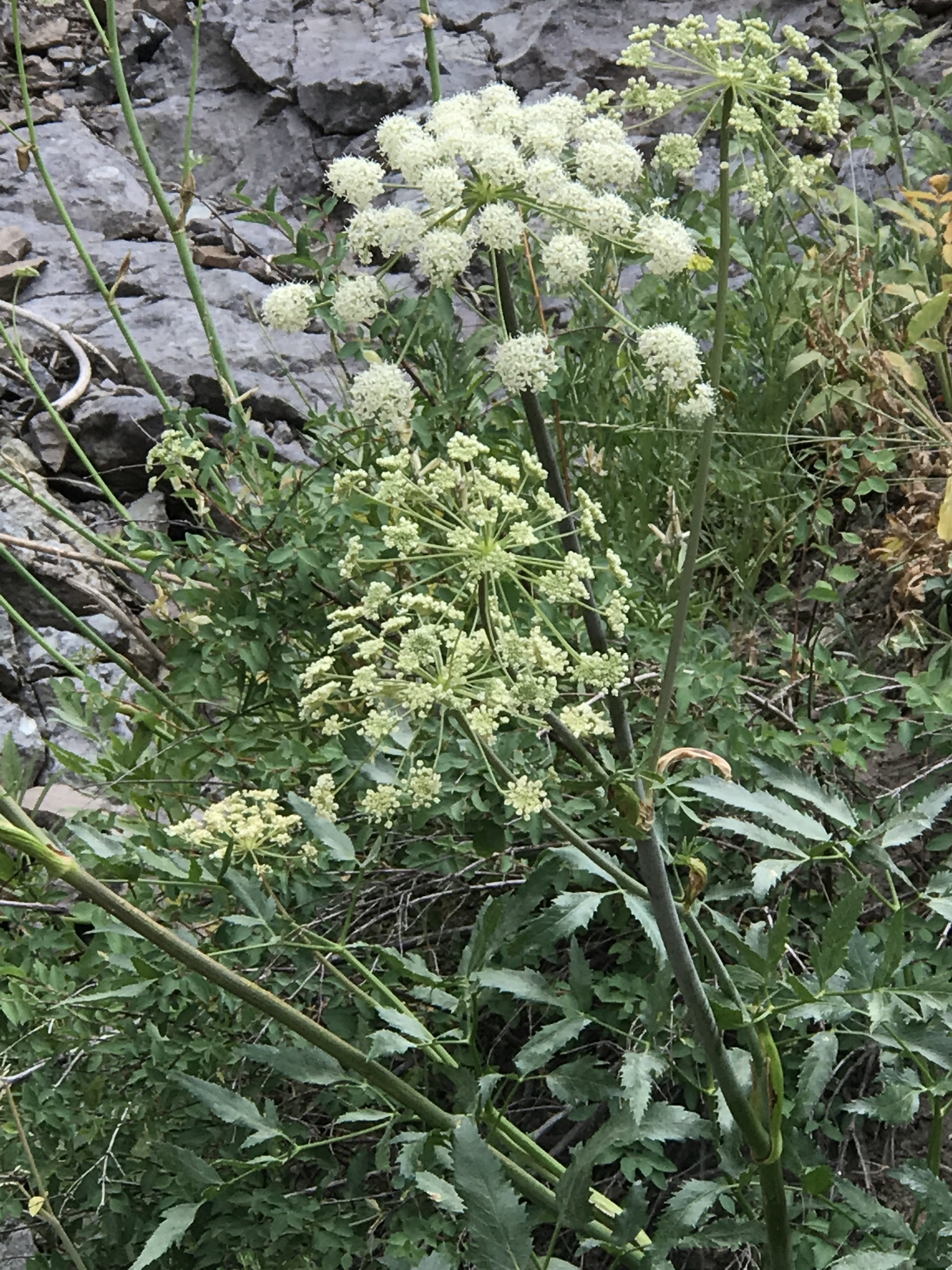

Scientific classification
- Kingdom: Plantae
- Clade: Tracheophytes
- Clade: Angiosperms
- Clade: Eudicots
- Clade: Asterids
- Order: Apiales
- Family: Apiaceae
- Genus: Angelica
- Species: A. breweri

Binomial name
- Angelica breweri A.Gray

= Angelica breweri =

Species of plant

Angelica breweri is a species of angelica known as Brewer's angelica. It is native to the high mountain ranges of eastern California and far western Nevada, where it grows in coniferous forests. This is a taprooted perennial herb producing an erect, hollow, hairy stem to heights between 1 and 2 meters. The large leaves are composed of many highly dissected leaflets, each up to 10 centimeters long. The inflorescence is a compound umbel with up to 50 long rays holding clusters of hairy white flowers. The base of each pedicel has a thick webbing. The fruit is a pair of ribbed bodies, each containing a seed.

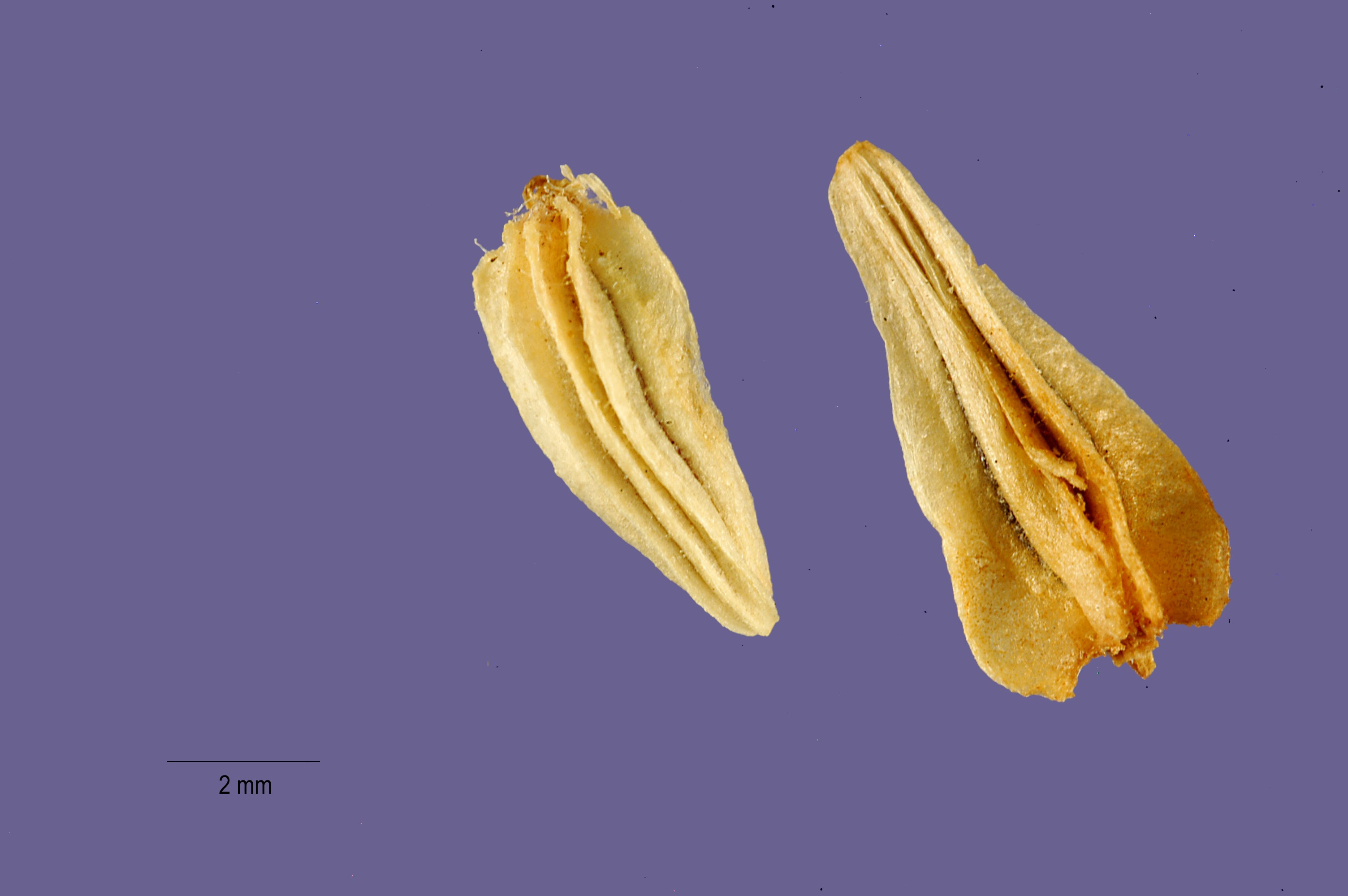
Seeds
