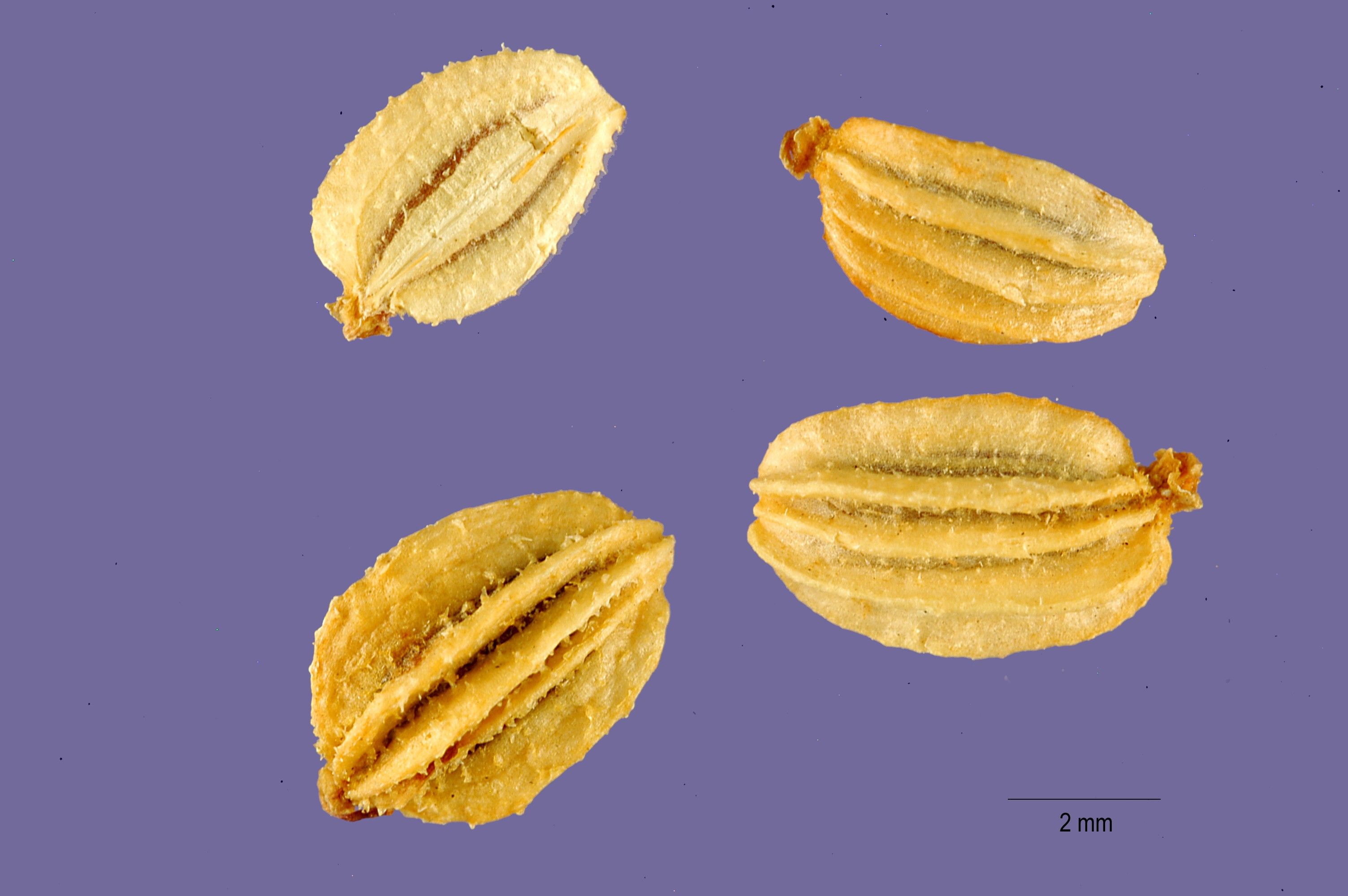
- seeds

Scientific classification
- Kingdom: Plantae
- Clade: Tracheophytes
- Clade: Angiosperms
- Clade: Eudicots
- Clade: Asterids
- Order: Apiales
- Family: Apiaceae
- Genus: Angelica
- Species: A. kingii

Binomial name
- Angelica kingii (S.Watson) J.M.Coult. & Rose

= Angelica kingii =

Species of flowering plant

Angelica kingii is a species of angelica known as King's angelica. It is native to the western United States, especially the Great Basin region. This is a taprooted perennial herb varying in shape and size. It produces an erect, hollow stem to heights between 30 centimeters and two meters. The large leaves are composed of many lance-shaped leaflets each up to 12 centimeters in length. The inflorescence is a compound umbel with up to 14 long rays each holding clusters of small hairy flowers. The fruit is a pair of bodies about half a centimeter long each containing a seed.
