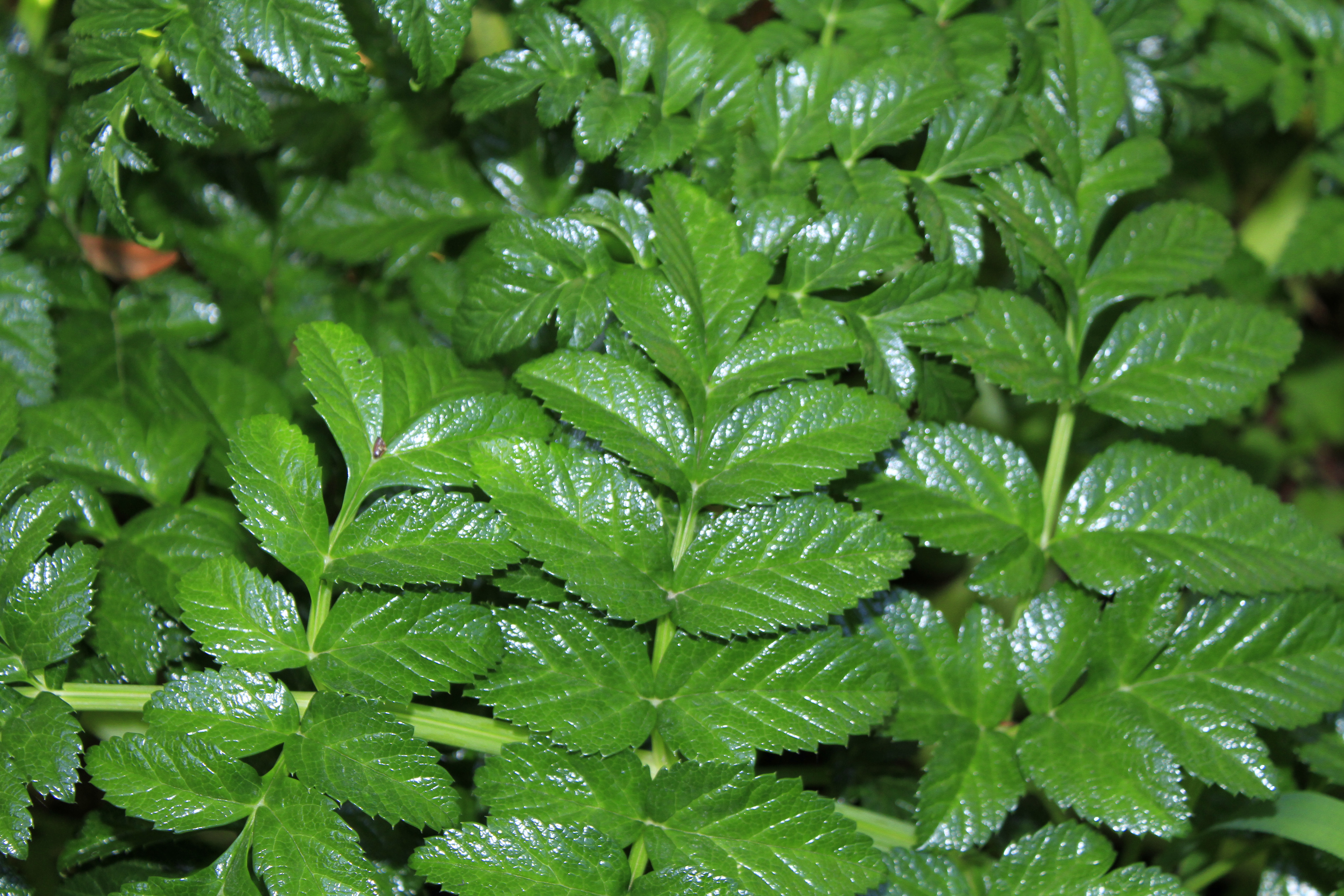

Scientific classification
- Kingdom: Plantae
- Clade: Tracheophytes
- Clade: Angiosperms
- Clade: Eudicots
- Clade: Asterids
- Order: Apiales
- Family: Apiaceae
- Genus: Angelica
- Species: A. pachycarpa

Binomial name
- Angelica pachycarpa Lange.

= Angelica pachycarpa =

Shiny-leaved angelica

Species of flowering plant

Angelica pachycarpa, the Portuguese angelica, is a herbaceous perennial plant native to north western Spain and western Portugal, and naturalised in New Zealand. It inhabits forests, grasslands and stream sides and is occasionally grown as an ornamental garden subject for its glossy foliage and umbels of white flowers.

== Distribution ==
It is present in coastal regions of north western Spain from Santander west to the Portugal-Spain border and has a disjunct population in the Berlengas archipelago off central-western Portugal.

== Description ==
Angelica pachycarpa is a short-lived, stout fleshy plant. It grows about one meter tall, with very glossy dark green foliage. It has creamy-white to greenish-white flowers in flat umbels that are ten to twenty centimeters wide. The foliage and hollow stems have a faint aniseed odor. The stems are grooved. The base foliage is two to three pinnate and noticeable petiolate; the stem leaves are one to three pinnate with very short petioles. The fruit are up to twelve millimeters long, brown with lighter colored wings, and have a pepper-like scent.

Angelica pachycarpa is found growing in the Crithmo-Armerion maritimae (Géhu 1968) community of plants in Spain and Portugal which includes these species also: Armeria berlengensis, Armeria euscadiensis, Armeria maritima subsp. miscella, Armeria pubigera subsp. depilata, Armeria pubigera subsp. pubigera, Centaurea borjae, Daucus gingidium subsp. atlanticum, Leucanthemum ircutianum subsp. crassifolium, Leucanthemum merinoi, Leucanthemum pluriflorum, Rumex acetosa subsp. biformis, Rumex rupestris, Sesamoides suffruticosa subsp. latifolia, Silene uniflora, Spergularia rupicola subsp. rupicola, Trifolium occidentale.
