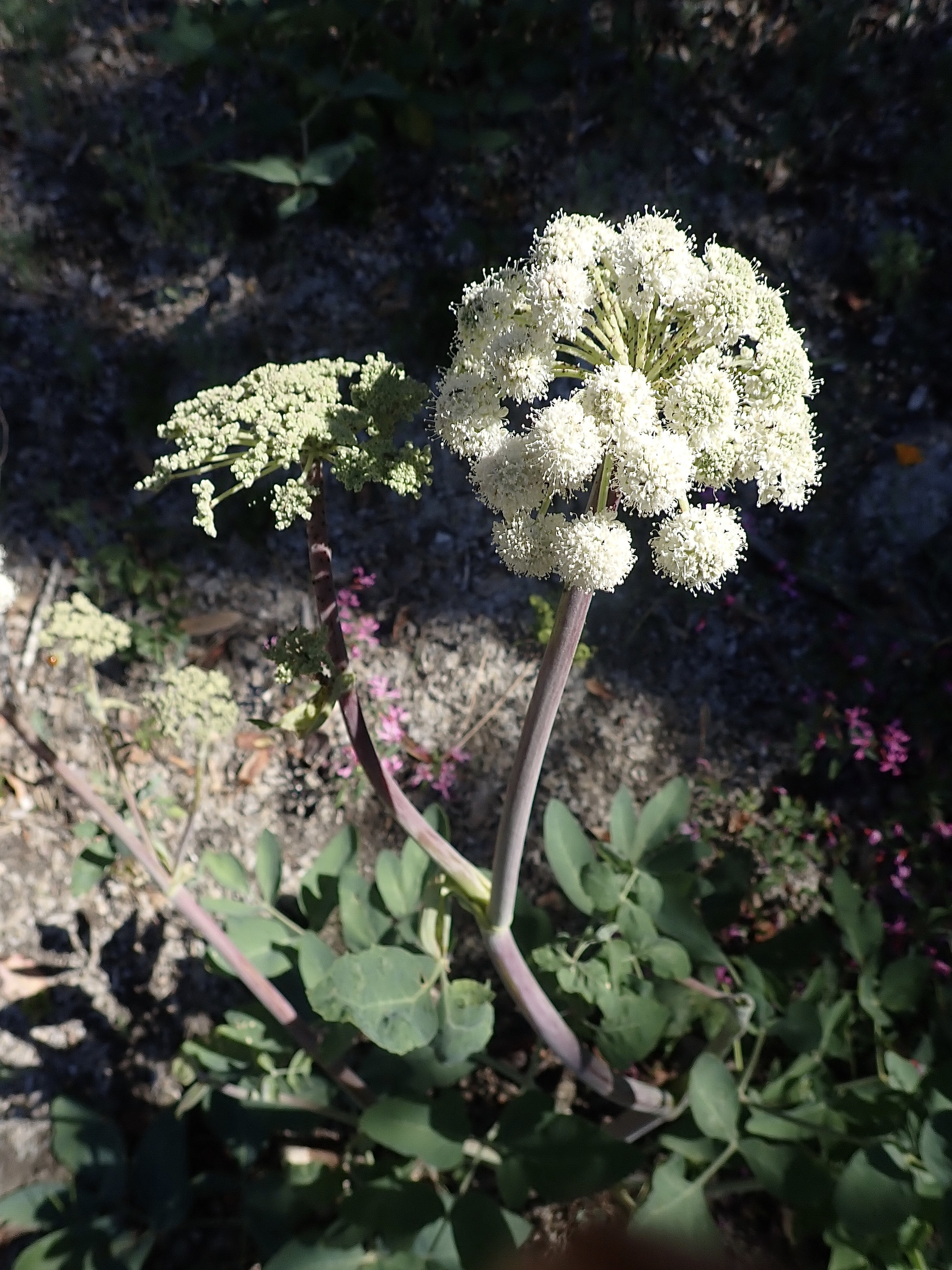

Scientific classification
- Kingdom: Plantae
- Clade: Tracheophytes
- Clade: Angiosperms
- Clade: Eudicots
- Clade: Asterids
- Order: Apiales
- Family: Apiaceae
- Genus: Angelica
- Species: A. tomentosa

Binomial name
- Angelica tomentosa S.Watson

= Angelica tomentosa =

Species of flowering plant

Angelica tomentosa is a species of angelica known as woolly angelica. It is native to the coastal mountain ranges of California and southern Oregon, where it grows in wooded areas. This is a taprooted perennial herb producing an erect, hollow stem to heights generally between 1 and 2 meters. The leaves may be nearly a meter long but are actually made up of many leaflike leaflets, each up to 12 centimeters long and lance-shaped to oval and sometimes toothed. The inflorescence is a compound umbel of up to 60 long rays each bearing clusters of whitish or yellowish flowers.
