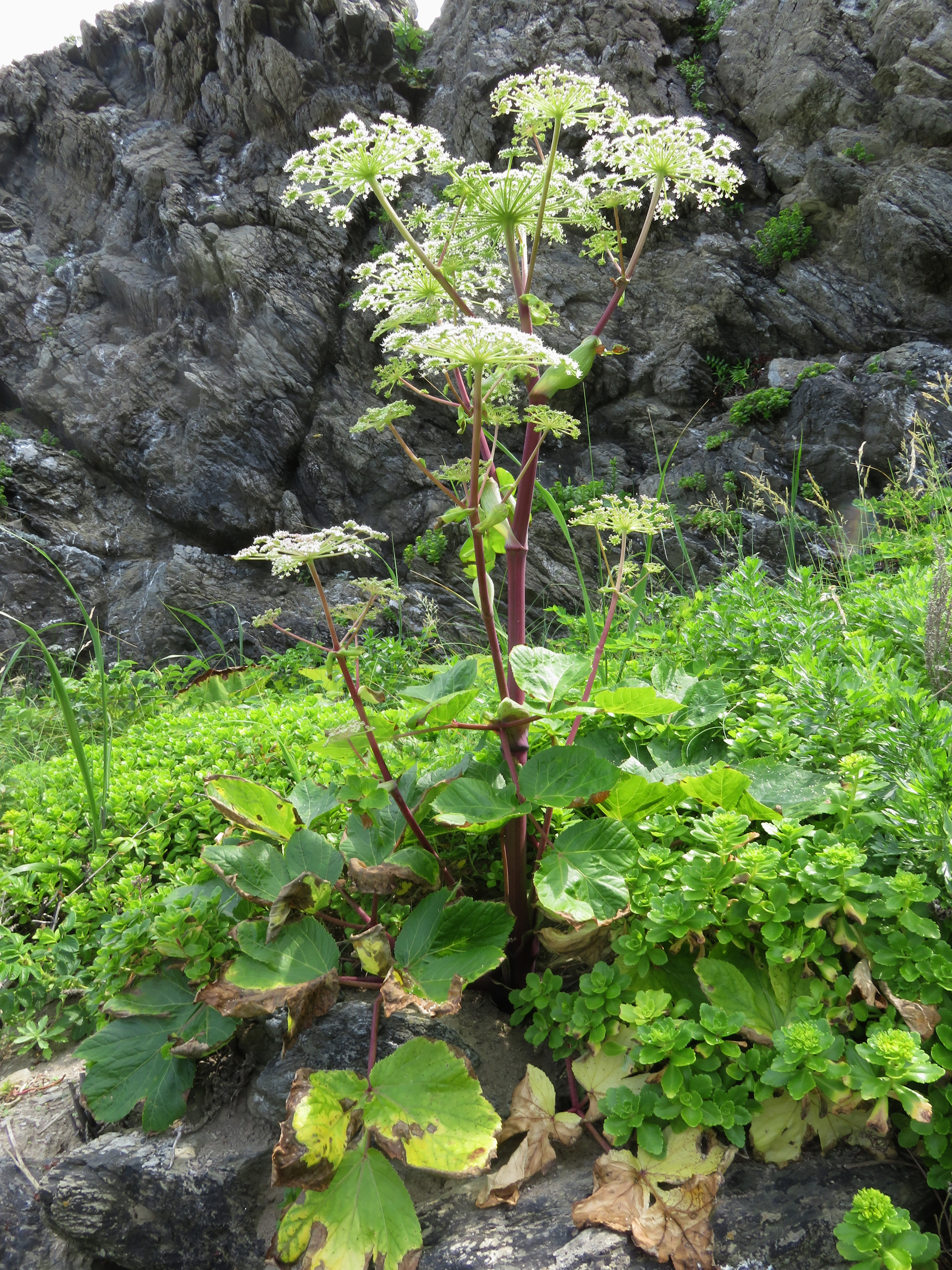
- Habit

Scientific classification
- Kingdom: Plantae
- Clade: Tracheophytes
- Clade: Angiosperms
- Clade: Eudicots
- Clade: Asterids
- Order: Apiales
- Family: Apiaceae
- Genus: Angelica
- Species: A. edulis

Binomial name
- Angelica edulis Miyabe ex Y.Yabe

Synonyms
- Angelica edulis f. triloba Koidz.

= Angelica edulis =

- Inflorescence

Species of plant

Angelica edulis, the edible angelica, is a species of flowering plant in the family Apiaceae. It is native to Sakhalin, the Kurils, and northern Japan. An erect perennial reaching 3 m (10 ft), it is typically found in moist situations and can handle full sun and partial shade. It is occasionally available from commercial suppliers.
