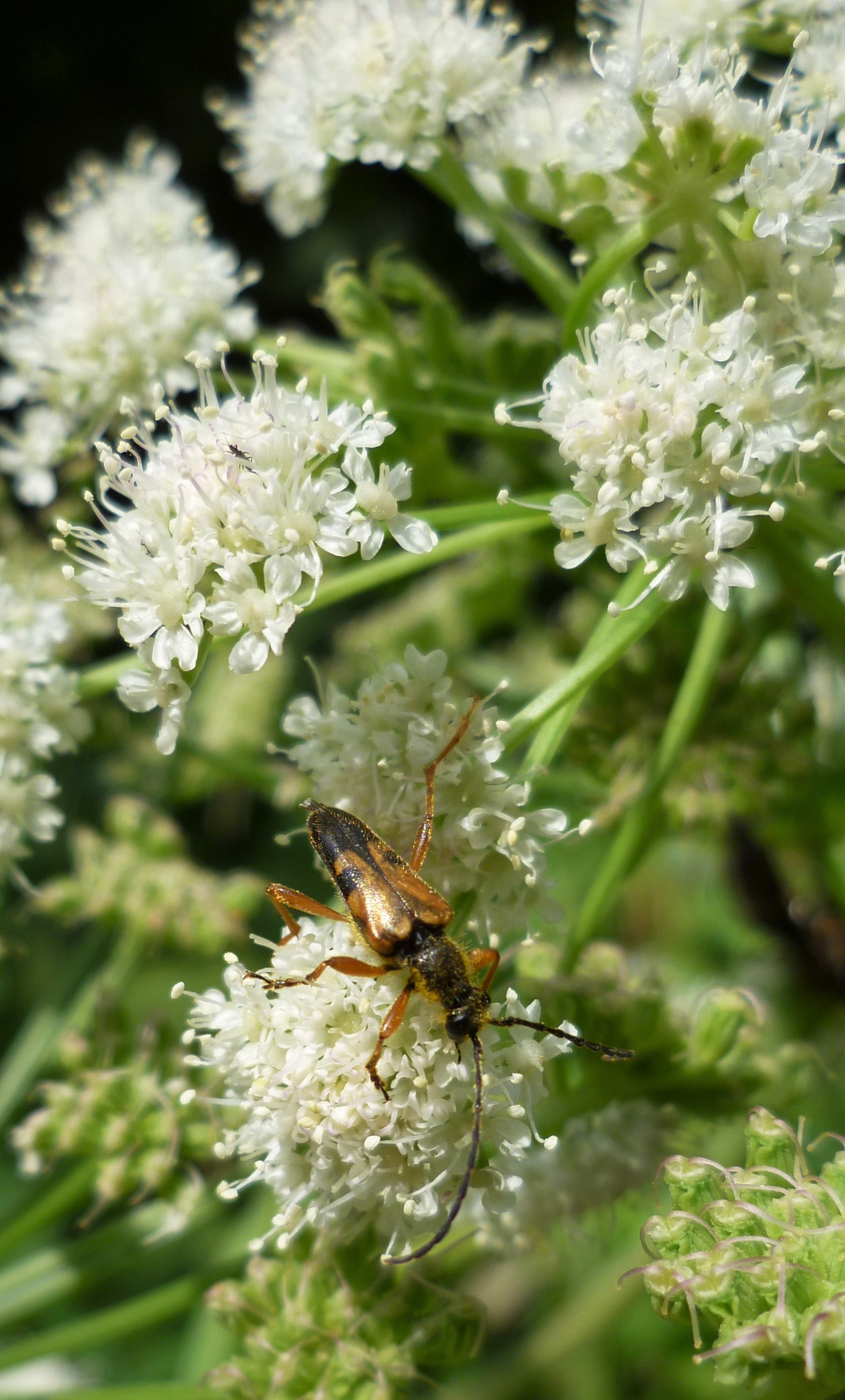
- Angelica arguta near Lake Wenatchee, Chelan County Washington

Scientific classification
- Kingdom: Plantae
- Clade: Embryophytes
- Clade: Tracheophytes
- Clade: Spermatophytes
- Clade: Angiosperms
- Clade: Eudicots
- Clade: Asterids
- Order: Apiales
- Family: Apiaceae
- Genus: Angelica
- Species: A. arguta

Binomial name
- Angelica arguta Nutt.

= Angelica arguta =

Species of flowering plant

Angelica arguta commonly known as Lyall's angelica is a species of angelica. It is native to western North America, where it grows in coniferous forests from British Columbia to Utah. This is a taprooted perennial herb growing an erect, hollow stem to heights between one and two meters. It produces large, somewhat triangular leaves made up of many toothed, pointed leaflets each up to 9 centimeters long. The top of the stout stem is occupied by an inflorescence in a compound umbel arrangement, with the webbed rays of the umbel up to 10 centimeters long each. The flowers are generally yellowish.

The roots have been used medicinally for colds, sore throats or cramps. Beetles pollinate the flowers. Also an important bear food, consuming new leaves and stems in spring, and digging and eating roots in the fall

== Unresolved Lineage ==
Molecular phylogenetic analyses have identified two distinct lineages within Angelica arguta: a Rocky Mountain lineage occurring in the interior Western United States and a Klamath Mountain lineage restricted to Northern California. The two groups differ genetically and exhibit subtle differences in fruit and leaf morphology. Their taxonomic status remains unresolved, and further study has been recommended to determine whether they represent separate species or reflect historical hybridization and incomplete lineage sorting.
