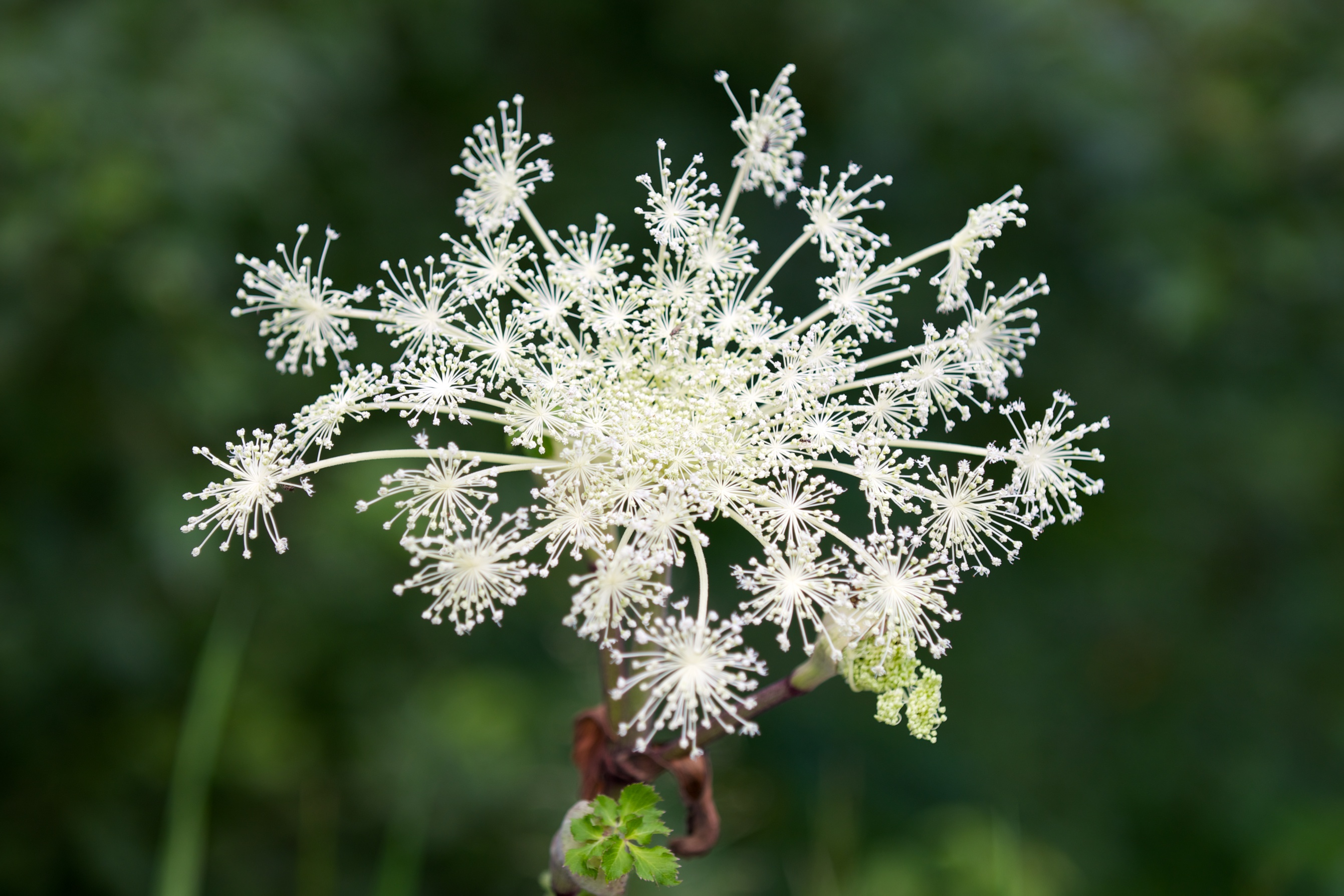

Scientific classification
- Kingdom: Plantae
- Clade: Tracheophytes
- Clade: Angiosperms
- Clade: Eudicots
- Clade: Asterids
- Order: Apiales
- Family: Apiaceae
- Genus: Angelica
- Species: A. pubescens

Binomial name
- Angelica pubescens Maxim.

Synonyms
- Angelica polyclada Franch.

= Angelica pubescens =

Species of flowering plant

Angelica pubescens is a plant in the family Apiaceae, native to Japan and Taiwan. The Japanese common name is shishiudo. In Mainland China, the plant under the name Angelica pubescens is actually Angelica biserrata.

It is a herbaceous perennial plant growing to 1–2 m tall with tripinnate leaves up to 1 m long, the leaflets being 5–10 cm long. The flowers are white, produced in large umbels.

The young stems and leaves are edible. Shishiudo is often mistaken with udo.
