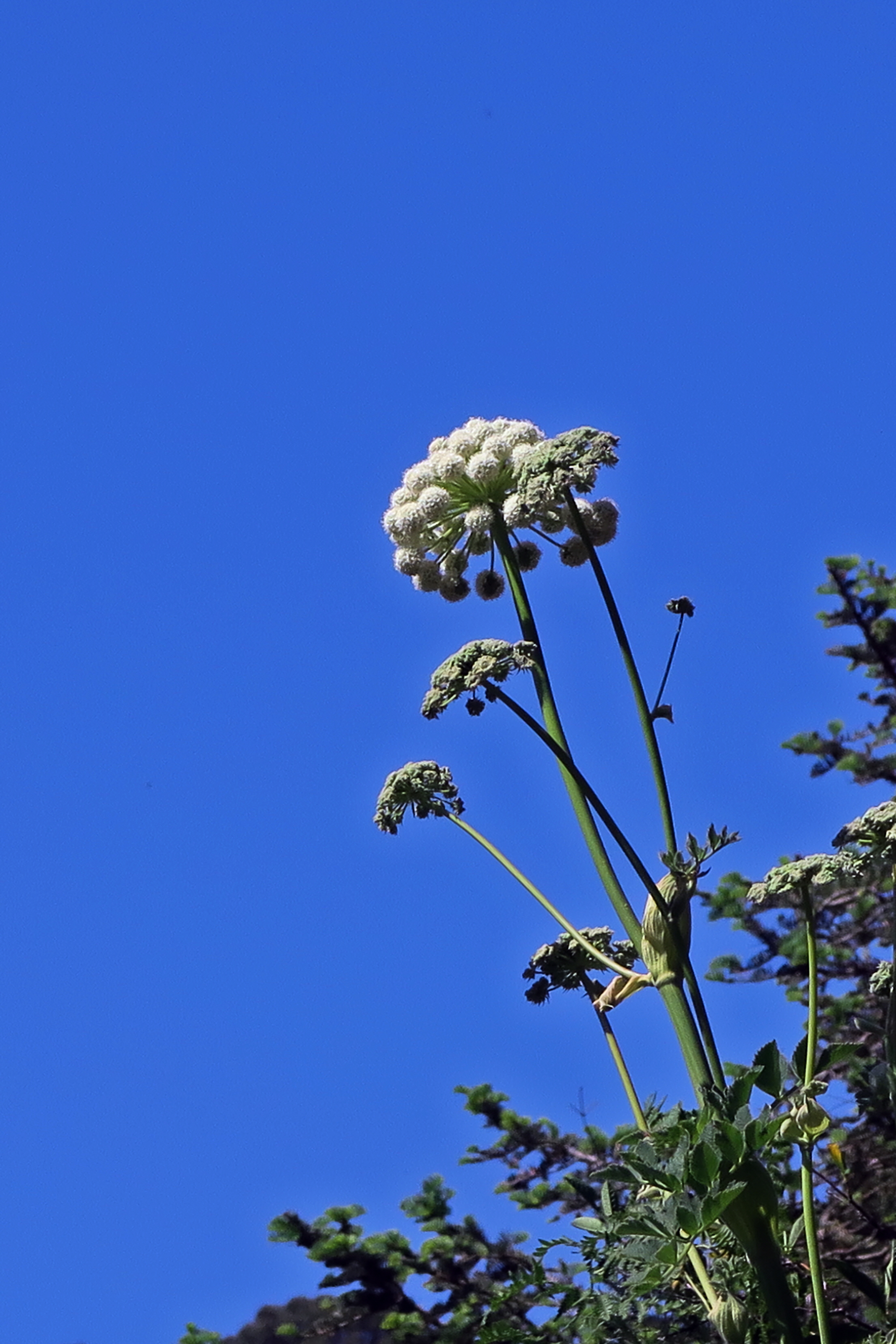

Scientific classification
- Kingdom: Plantae
- Clade: Embryophytes
- Clade: Tracheophytes
- Clade: Angiosperms
- Clade: Eudicots
- Clade: Asterids
- Order: Apiales
- Family: Apiaceae
- Genus: Angelica
- Species: A. hendersonii

Binomial name
- Angelica hendersonii J.M.Coult. & Rose

= Angelica hendersonii =

Henderson's angelica

Species of flowering plant

Angelica hendersonii is a species of angelica known as Henderson's angelica or coast angelica. It is native to the west coast of the United States from Washington to central California, where it grows in the coastal sage scrub and other habitat on the immediate coastline. This is a taprooted perennial herb that grows to heights between about 1 and 2 meters. Leaves are made up of oval-shaped leaflets each up to 10 centimeters long, with toothed edges and white woolly undersides. The woolly inflorescences are compound umbels of up to 60 rays holding clusters of fuzzy whitish flowers. The flowers yield fruits which are paired bodies nearly a centimeter long each containing a seed. This plant mainly blooms/flowers during months from June to August, though some individuals can be found blooming from months leading up to November. Native American people such as the Ohlone used this plant for medical practices. This includes using heating leaves for skin disorders, treating headaches by inhaling smoke from burning roots, and applying burned twigs for rheumatic pains.
