= Percy James Greenway =

British botanist (1897–1980)

Percy James Greenway OBE (born 1897 - died 1980) was a British botanist
