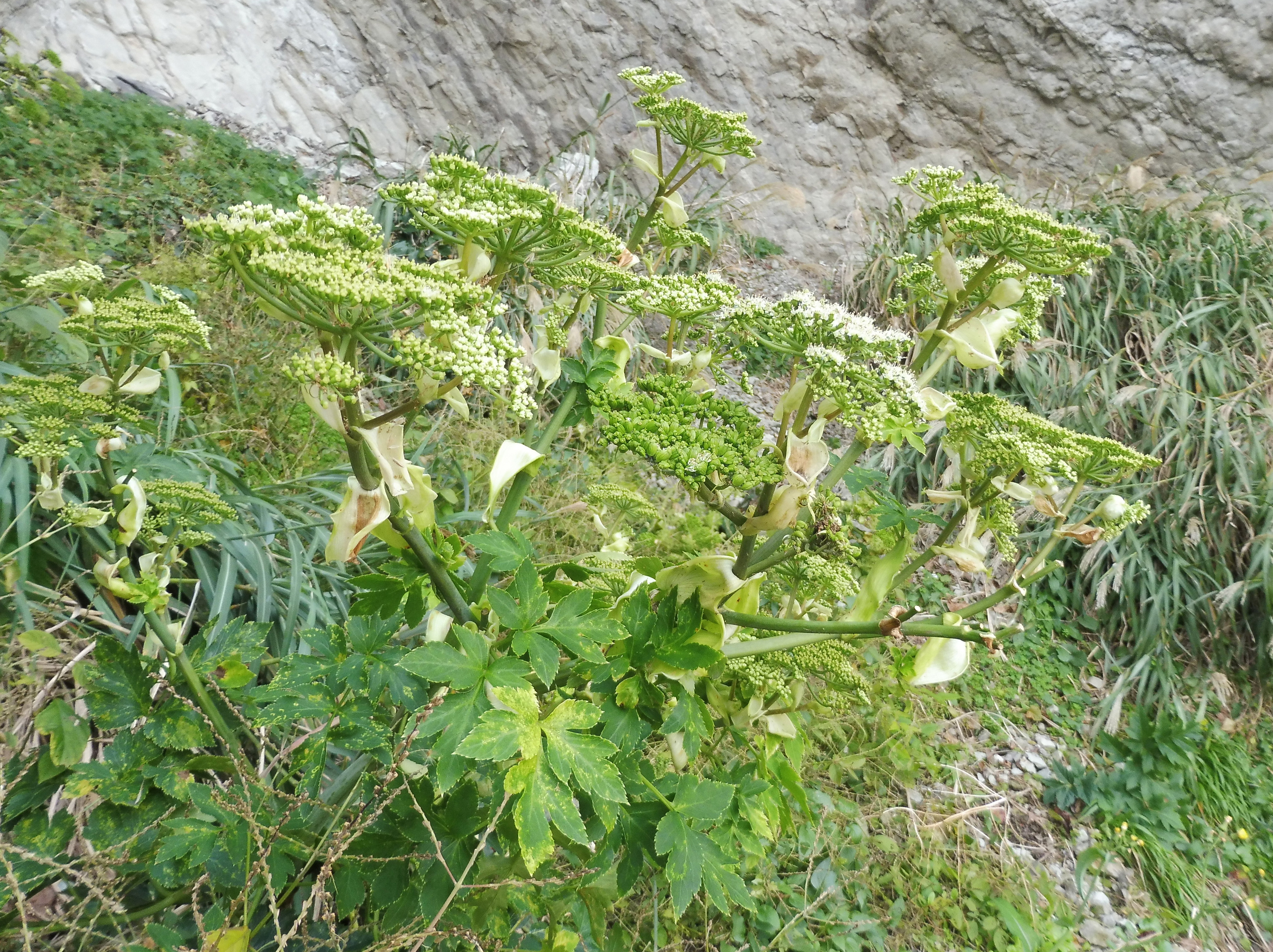

Scientific classification
- Kingdom: Plantae
- Clade: Tracheophytes
- Clade: Angiosperms
- Clade: Eudicots
- Clade: Asterids
- Order: Apiales
- Family: Apiaceae
- Genus: Angelica
- Species: A. keiskei

Binomial name
- Angelica keiskei (Miq.) Koidz.

= Ashitaba =

Species of flowering plant

Angelica keiskei, commonly known under the Japanese name of ashitaba (アシタバ or 明日葉), literally "tomorrow's leaf", is a species of flowering plant in the carrot family. It is native to Japan, where it is found on the Pacific Coast. It is native to the area of the Bōsō Peninsula, Miura Peninsula, Izu Peninsula, and the Izu Islands. It has been widely cultivated outside its natural range.

== Description ==
It is a perennial, with a typical growth height of 50–120 cm. Like most other members of the carrot family, it produces large umbels of white flowers and has dissected leaves.

Angelica keiskei closely resembles Angelica japonica, but can be distinguished by its blooming period, which lasts from May to October, whereas A. japonica's blooming period lasts only between May and July. Another indicator is the characteristic color of its sap.

== Taxonomy ==
This species is named in honor of Keisuke Ito, a Japanese physician and biologist. A named cultivar of this species, "Koidzumi", refers to botanist Gen'ichi Koizumi. The Japanese name of Angelica keiskei, "ashitaba" (tomorrow-leaf), stems from the above-average regenerative capabilities it exhibits after injury.

== Cultivation ==
Many Japanese plant ashitaba in herb gardens, flower pots, and backyards. This is due to the modest conditions for cultivation and fast rate of growth. This is a cold hardy plant, with optimal temperatures ranging between 12 and 22 °C. Harvesting a leaf at the break of day often results in a new sprout growing overnight, being visible the following morning, hence the name "tomorrow's leaf".

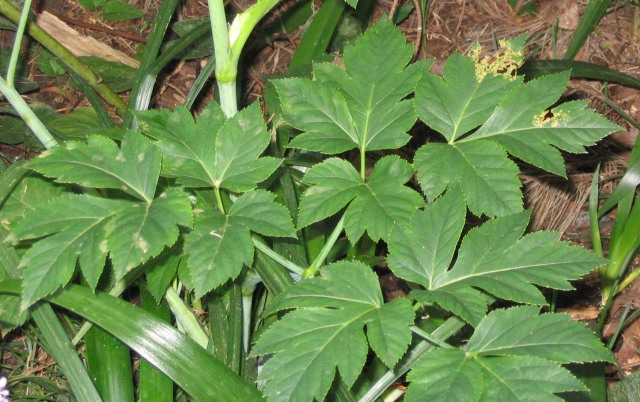
Angelica keiskei leaves in cultivation

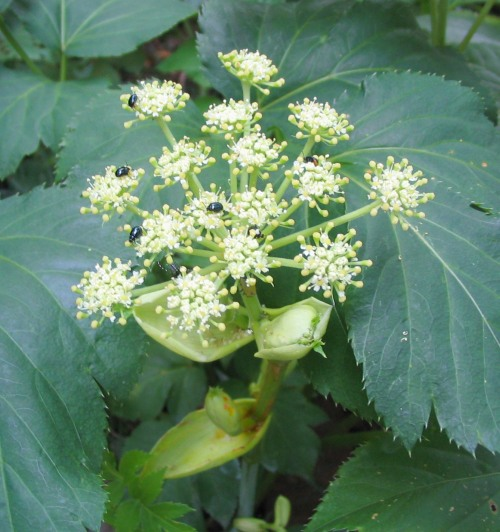
Flowers

== Uses ==
=== As food ===
The main use of their stipes, leaves, and taproots is in regional cuisine, where they are used to prepare soba, tempura, shōchū, tea, ice cream, pasta, etc.. The Mikura-jima variety might excel in this regard, as it is reputed to be less bitter than others.

==== Historical use ====
Traditionally, it is seen as a major contributor to the supposedly healthier, extended lives of the local residents, possibly due to the chalconoids that are unique to this species of Angelica. At one point in Edo period, the haulm's yellow sap was effectively used in the external treatment of smallpox, which prompted Kaibara Ekken to describe the herb in his Yamato honzō (大和本草), under the name of ashitagusa (鹹草), as "a powerful tonic drug". In folk medicine, it is claimed to be a diuretic, tonic, to improve digestion, and to speed wound healing and prevent infection when applied topically. Also, its nutritive qualities are said to be the factor behind the internal exiles and their families' never waning stamina in the face of their arduous, compulsory labor.

For similar reasons, it very widely serves as pasture for cattle, reckoned to improve the quality of milk, as well as the yield, and to maintain cattle health at the same time. Most of these claims have yet to be proven in trials, while studies have substantiated the presence of furocoumarins in several of these plants' components. Furanocumarin is known to increase skin sensitivity to sunlight and may cause dermatitis.
