= List of Apiales of Montana =

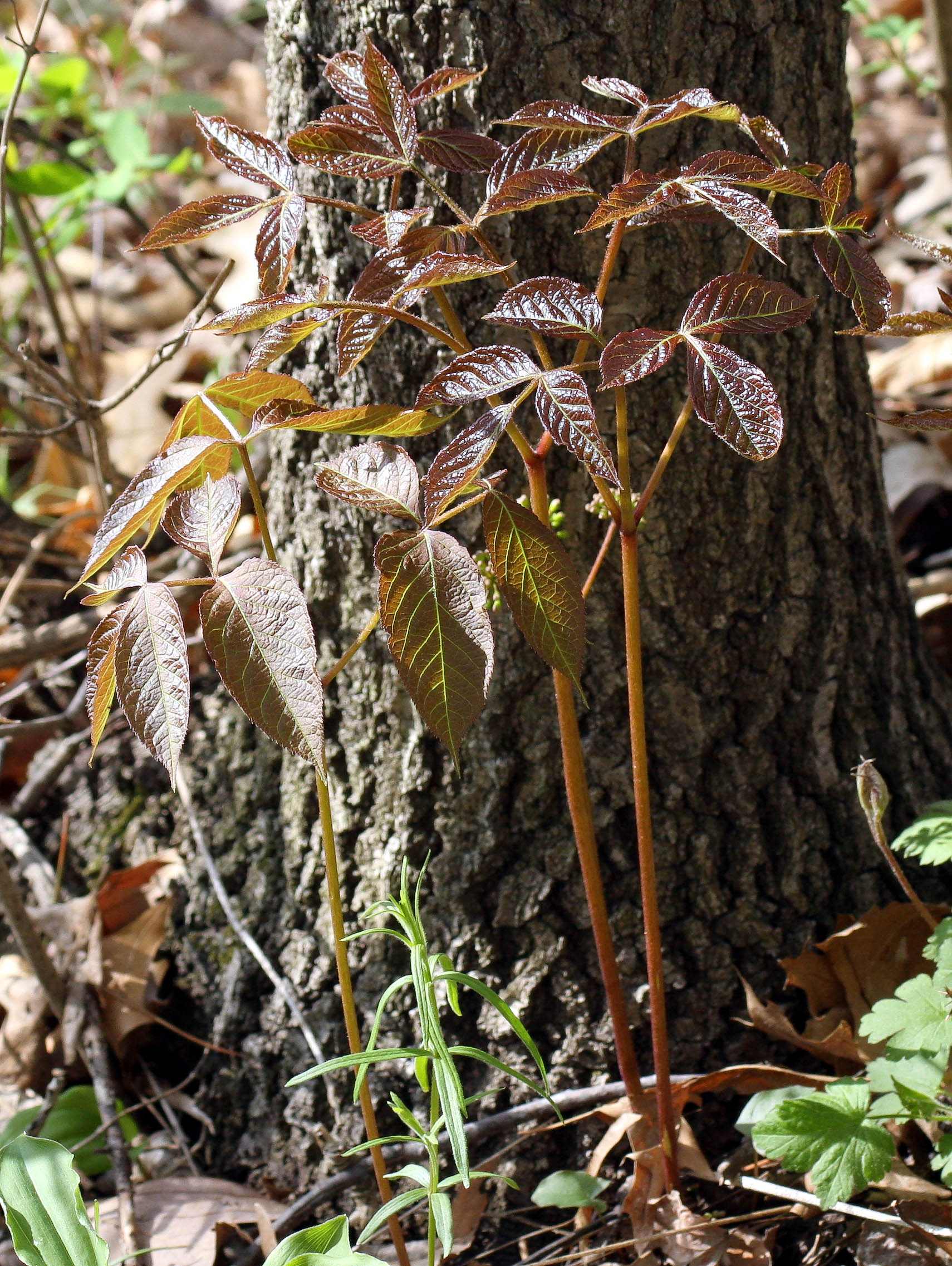
Wild sarsaparilla, Aralia nudicaulis

There are at least 59 members of the Ginseng and Parsley order: Apiales found in Montana. Some of these species are exotics (not native to Montana) and some species have been designated as Species of Concern.

== Ginseng ==
Family: Araliaceae

- Aralia nudicaulis, wild sarsaparilla
- Oplopanax horridus, devil's-club

== Parsley ==
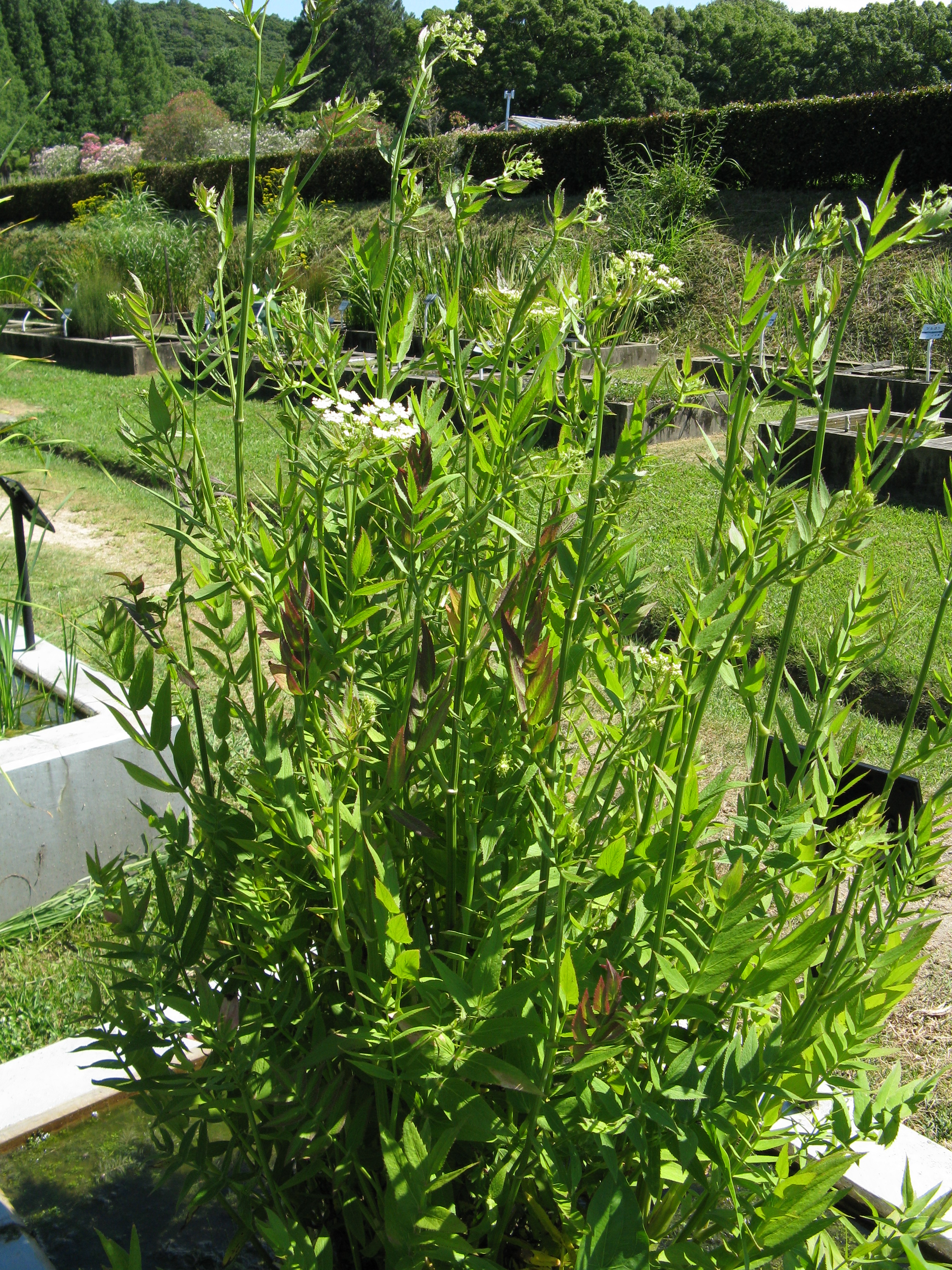
Hemlock water-parsnip, Sium suave

Family: Apiaceae

- Angelica arguta, Lyall's angelica
- Angelica dawsonii, Dawson's angelica
- Angelica pinnata, small-leaf angelica
- Angelica roseana, rock angelica
- Anthriscus cerefolium, common chervil
- Berula erecta, wild parsnip
- Bupleurum americanum, American thorowax
- Carum carvi, common caraway
- Cicuta bulbifera, bulb-bearing water-hemlock
- Cicuta douglasii, western water-hemlock
- Cicuta maculata, spotted water-hemlock
- Conioselinum scopulorum, hemlock parsley
- Conium maculatum, poison-hemlock
- Cymopterus acaulis, plains spring-parsley
- Cymopterus bipinnatus, snow spring-parsley
- Cymopterus glaucus, waxy spring-parsley
- Cymopterus hendersonii, Henderson's wavewing
- Cymopterus longilobus, Henderson's wavewing
- Cymopterus terebinthinus, turpentine wavewing
- Cymopterus terebinthinus var. terebinthus
- Cymopterus terebinthinus var. foeniculaceus
- Daucus carota, wild carrot
- Heracleum lanatum, cow-parsnip
- Ligusticum canbyi, canby's wild lovage
- Ligusticum filicinum, fern-leaf lovage
- Ligusticum tenuifolium, slender-leaf lovage
- Lomatium ambiguum, Wyeth biscuitroot
- Lomatium attenuatum, taper-tip desert-parsley
- Lomatium bicolor, bicolor biscuitroot
- Lomatium cous, cous biscuitroot
- Lomatium cusickii, Cusick's desert-parsley
- Lomatium dissectum, fernleaf biscuitroot
- Lomatium foeniculaceum, carrotleaf desert-parsley
- Lomatium geyeri, Geyer's biscuitroot
- Lomatium macrocarpum, large-fruit desert-parsley
- Lomatium nuttallii, Nuttall desert-parsley
- Lomatium orientale, oriental desert-parsley
- Lomatium sandbergii, Sandberg's biscuitroot
- Lomatium triternatum, nineleaf biscuitroot
- Lomatium triternatum, nineleaf biscuitroot
- Lomatium triternatum, umbrella desert-parsley
- Musineon divaricatum, wild parsley
- Musineon vaginatum, Rydberg's parsley
- Orogenia linearifolia, Great Basin Indian-potato
- Osmorhiza chilensis, Chilean sweet-cicely
- Osmorhiza depauperata, blunt-fruit sweet-cicely
- Osmorhiza longistylis, smoother sweet-cicely
- Osmorhiza occidentalis, western sweet-cicely
- Osmorhiza purpurea, purple sweet-cicely
- Pastinaca sativa, wild parsnip
- Perideridia gairdneri, Gairdner's yampah
- Pimpinella saxifraga, burnet-saxifrage
- Sanicula graveolens, Sierra sanicle
- Sanicula marilandica, Maryland black snakeroot
- Shoshonea pulvinata, shoshonea
- Sium suave, hemlock water-parsnip
- Zizia aptera, golden alexanders

== See also ==
- List of dicotyledons of Montana
