= Prodoxus atascosanellus =

Scientific classification
- Kingdom: Animalia
- Phylum: Arthropoda
- Clade: Pancrustacea
- Class: Insecta
- Order: Lepidoptera
- Family: Prodoxidae
- Genus: Prodoxus
- Species: P. atascosanellus

Binomial name
- Prodoxus atascosanellus Pellmyr & Balcazar-Lara, 2005

Species of moth

Prodoxus atascosanellus is a moth of the family Prodoxidae. It is found from the Houston area of coastal Texas in the United States, south to the Mexican state of Michoacán, and west to the state of Durango.

The wingspan is 8.6-10.8 mm for males and 9.1-12.5 mm for females. Adults are on wing from mid February to May.

The larvae feed on Yucca treculeana, Yucca filifera and Yucca decipiens.

== Etymology ==
The species name refers to the type locality, Laguna Atascosa National Wildlife Refuge, in the Rio Grande/Rio Bravo river delta of southern Texas.
