= Antitropical distribution =

Antitropical (alternatives include biantitropical or amphitropical) distribution is a type of disjunct distribution where a species or clade exists at comparable latitudes across the equator but not in the tropics. For example, a species may be found north of the Tropic of Cancer and south of the Tropic of Capricorn, but not in between. With increasing time since dispersal, the disjunct populations may be the same variety, species, or clade. How the life forms distribute themselves to the opposite hemisphere when they can't normally survive in the middle depends on the species; plants may have their seed spread through wind, animal, or other methods and then germinate upon reaching the appropriate climate, while sea life may be able to travel through the tropical regions in a larval state or by going through deep ocean currents with much colder temperatures than on the surface. For the American amphitropical distribution, dispersal has been generally agreed to be more likely than vicariance from a previous distribution including the tropics in North and South America.

Peter Raven identified three patterns of amphitropical disjunct distribution of plants. Bipolar disjuncts are taxa which occur at high (subpolar or polar) latitudes. Temperate disjuncts are those which occur in temperate climates. Desert disjuncts occur in the Sonoran, Chihuahuan, and central Mexican deserts of North America (southwestern United States and northern Mexico) and in the deserts and semi-deserts of southern South America. Raven identified 30 bipolar disjunct species and closely-related species pairs, 130 temperate disjuncts, and 'a substantial number' of desert disjuncts.

== Known cases ==
=== Plants ===
- Phacelia crenulata – scorpionweed
- Bowlesia incana – American Bowlesia
- Osmorhiza berteroi and Osmorhiza depauperata – sweet cecily species.
- Ruppia megacarpa
- Solenogyne
- For a list of American amphitropically distributed plants (237 vascular plants), see the tables in the open access paper Simpson et al. 2017 or their working group on figshare

=== Animals ===
- Scylla serrata – mud crab
- Freshwater crayfish
- Ground beetle genus Bembidion

=== Bryophytes and lichens ===
- Tetraplodon fuegianus - dung moss

== See also ==
- Rapoport's rule
