= Prodoxus tamaulipellus =

Scientific classification
- Kingdom: Animalia
- Phylum: Arthropoda
- Clade: Pancrustacea
- Class: Insecta
- Order: Lepidoptera
- Family: Prodoxidae
- Genus: Prodoxus
- Species: P. tamaulipellus

Binomial name
- Prodoxus tamaulipellus Pellmyr & Balcazar-Lara, 2005

Species of moth

Prodoxus tamaulipellus is a moth of the family Prodoxidae. It is found in thorn scrub interspersed with grasslands in the Tamaulipan biotic province which spans the borders of the southern United States and northern Mexico.

The wingspan is 8.4-11.1 mm for males and 9.4-12.5 for females. Adults are on wing from late February to early March.

The larvae feed on Yucca treculeana and Yucca filifera.
