= Yucca longifolia =

Yucca longifolia is a botanical synonym of three species of plant:

- Nolina parviflora published in 1830 by Josef August Schultes and Julius Hermann Schultes
- Yucca gloriosa published in 1859 by Élie-Abel Carrière
- Yucca treculiana published in 1862 by Samuel Botsford Buckley
