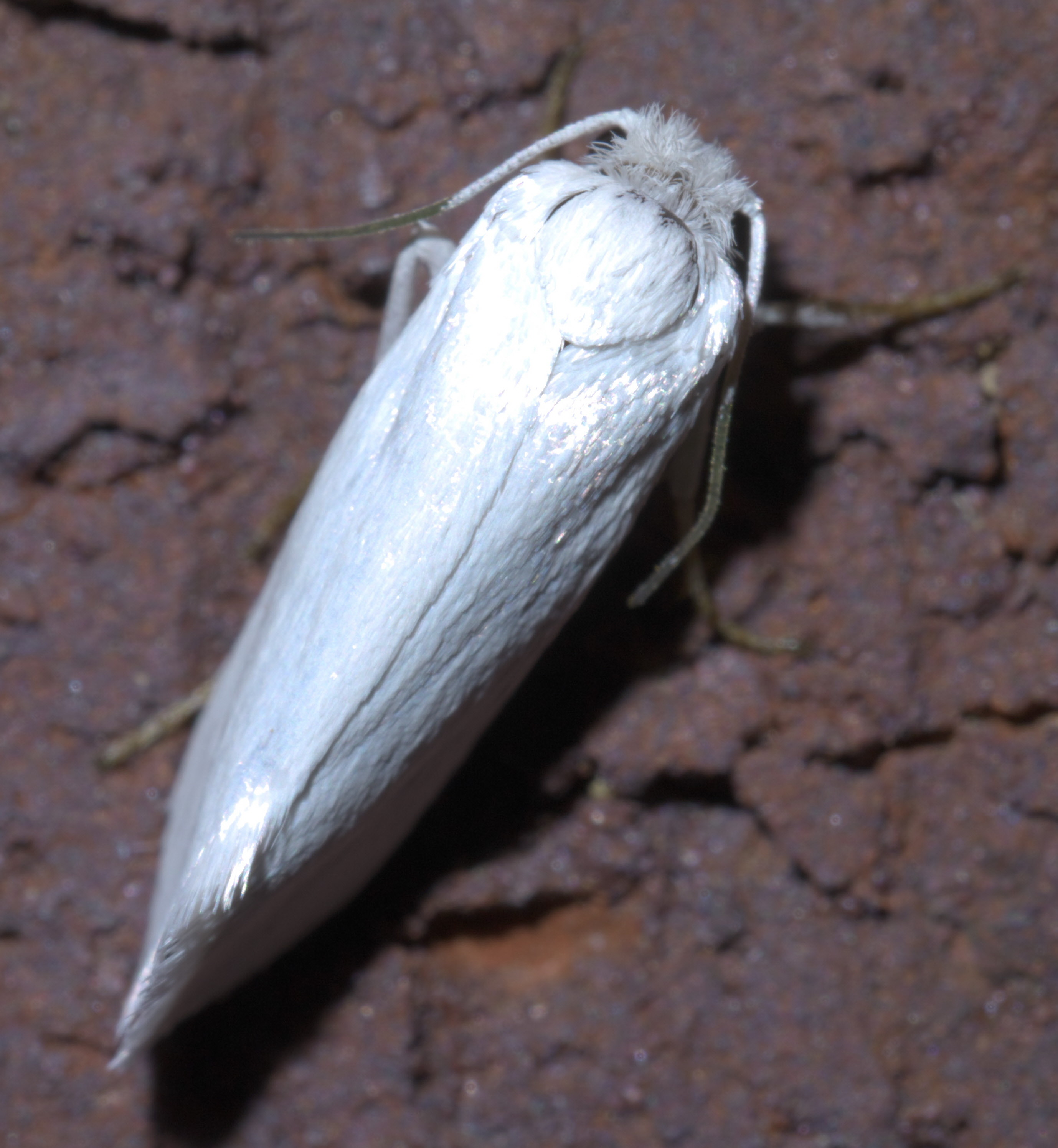

Scientific classification
- Kingdom: Animalia
- Phylum: Arthropoda
- Clade: Pancrustacea
- Class: Insecta
- Order: Lepidoptera
- Family: Prodoxidae
- Genus: Prodoxus; Riley, 1892

Synonyms
- Agavenema Davis, 1967

= Prodoxus =

Genus of moths

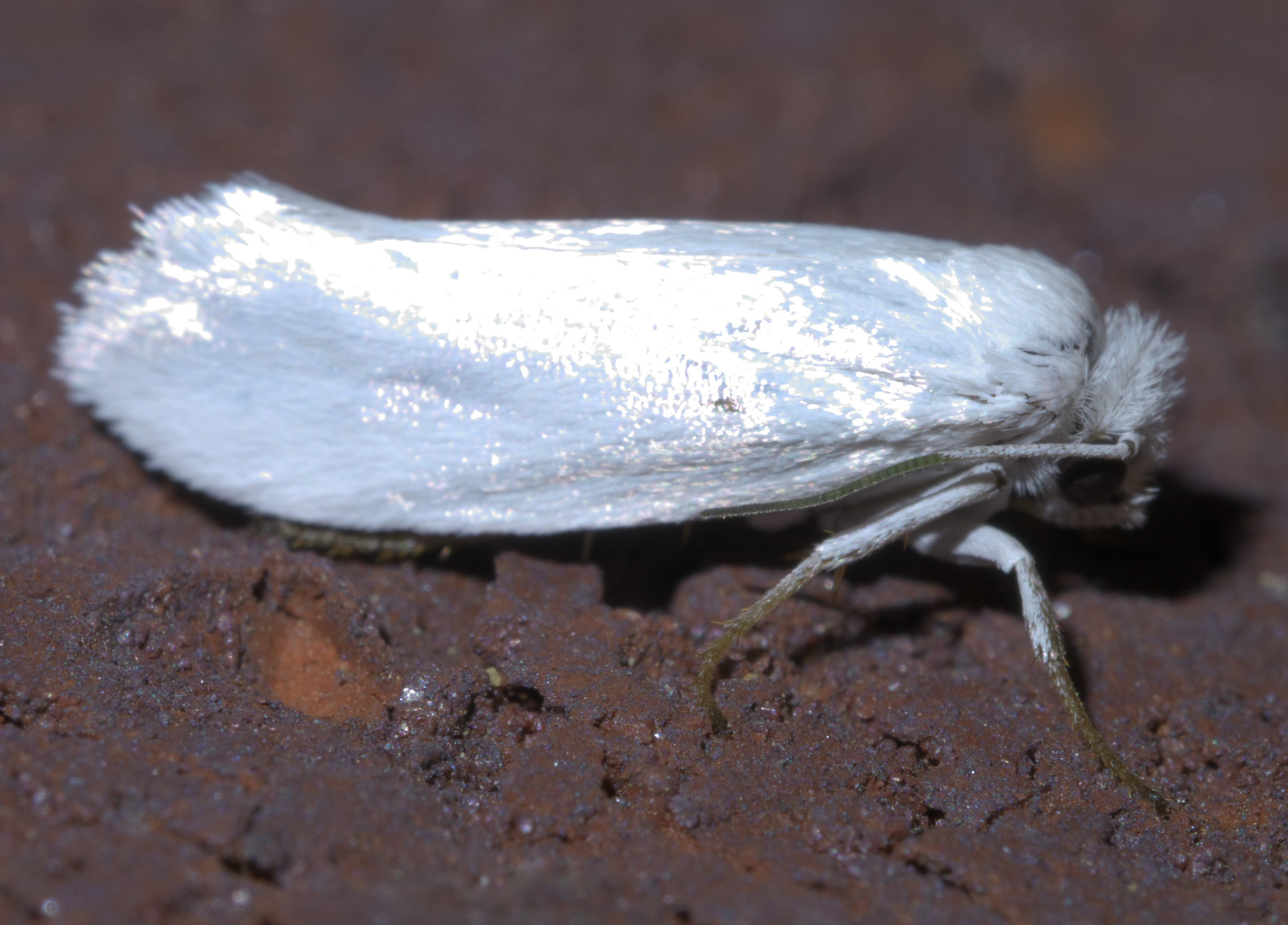
Prodoxus, bogus yucca moth

Prodoxus is a genus of moths of the family Prodoxidae. The members of this genus are known as bogus yucca moths.

== Species ==
- Prodoxus aenescens
- Prodoxus atascosanellus
- Prodoxus barberellus
- Prodoxus californicus
- Prodoxus carnerosanellus
- Prodoxus cinereus
- Prodoxus coloradensis
- Prodoxus decipiens
- Prodoxus gypsicolor
- Prodoxus intricatus
- Prodoxus mapimiensis
- Prodoxus marginatus (syn: Prodoxus pulverulentus)
- Prodoxus ochrocarus
- Prodoxus pallidus [=Prodoxus pallida per original spelling].
- Prodoxus phylloryctus
- Prodoxus praedictus
- Prodoxus quinquepunctellus (inc. syn. Prodoxus paradoxica, sometimes also P. decipiens)
- Prodoxus sonorensis
- Prodoxus sordidus
- Prodoxus tamaulipellus
- Prodoxus tehuacanensis
- Prodoxus weethumpi
- Prodoxus y-inversus

Transferred elsewhere:

- Prodoxus intermedius - see Tegeticula intermedius (Riley, 1881)
- Prodoxus reticulata - see Greya reticulata (Riley, 1892)
