= O. occidentalis =

O. occidentalis may refer to:

- Onychorhynchus occidentalis, the Pacific royal flycatcher, a bird species found in Ecuador and Peru
- Osmorhiza occidentalis, the western sweetroot, a flowering plant species native to much of western North America

== See also ==
- List of Latin and Greek words commonly used in systematic names#O
