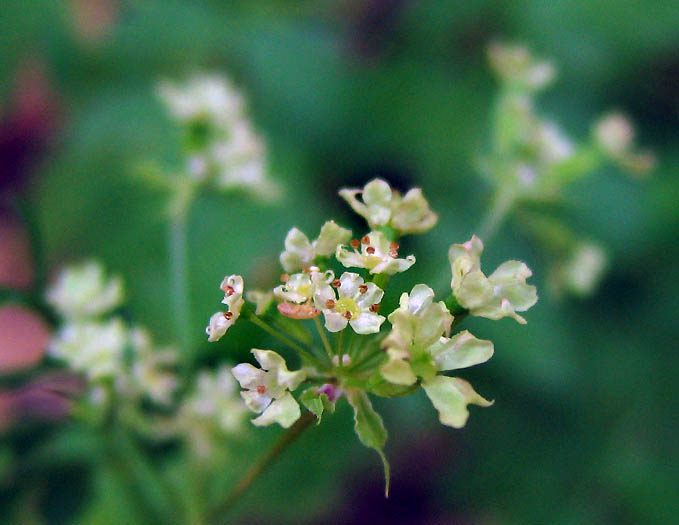

Conservation status
- Apparently Secure (NatureServe)

Scientific classification
- Kingdom: Plantae
- Clade: Tracheophytes
- Clade: Angiosperms
- Clade: Eudicots
- Clade: Asterids
- Order: Apiales
- Family: Apiaceae
- Genus: Osmorhiza
- Species: O. brachypoda

Binomial name
- Osmorhiza brachypoda Torr.

= Osmorhiza brachypoda =

California sweetcicely

Species of flowering plant

Osmorhiza brachypoda is a species of flowering plant in the family Apiaceae known by the common name California sweetcicely.

== Description ==
Osmorhiza brachypoda is a hairy, aromatic perennial herb growing 30–80 centimetres (12–31 in) tall.

The green leaves have blades up to 20 centimeters long which are divided into toothed or lobed leaflets. The blade is borne on a long petiole.

The inflorescence is a compound umbel of many tiny greenish yellow flowers at the tip of a stemlike peduncle. The narrow, elongated fruit is ribbed and bristly, measuring up to 2 centimeters long.

== Distribution and habitat ==
It is native to mountainous and wooded areas of California and Arizona, at elevations from 200–2,000 meters (660–6,560 ft). Habitats include chaparral and woodlands and coniferous forests.

It is found in the Southern California Coast Ranges, Transverse Ranges, Peninsular Ranges, and the central and southern Sierra Nevada foothills.

== Ecology ==
This is the only known host plant for the California endemic moth Greya suffusca.
