= Prodoxus praedictus =

Scientific classification
- Kingdom: Animalia
- Phylum: Arthropoda
- Clade: Pancrustacea
- Class: Insecta
- Order: Lepidoptera
- Family: Prodoxidae
- Genus: Prodoxus
- Species: P. praedictus

Binomial name
- Prodoxus praedictus Pellmyr, 2009

Species of moth

Prodoxus praedictus is a moth of the family Prodoxidae. It is found in the United States in the southern part of the Mojave Desert and bordering areas of the Colorado Desert, as well as in the central portion of the Joshua Tree National Park in California.

The wingspan is 10-10.9 mm for males and 11.4-12.8 mm for females. Adults are on wing from late March to early April.
