= Prodoxus ochrocarus =

Scientific classification
- Kingdom: Animalia
- Phylum: Arthropoda
- Clade: Pancrustacea
- Class: Insecta
- Order: Lepidoptera
- Family: Prodoxidae
- Genus: Prodoxus
- Species: P. ochrocarus

Binomial name
- Prodoxus ochrocarus Davis, 1967

Species of moth

Prodoxus ochrocarus is a moth of the family Prodoxidae, which lives in the dry oak and pine forests of southeastern Arizona, United States. The larvae bore into floral rachis to feed on their host plant, Yucca schottii.
