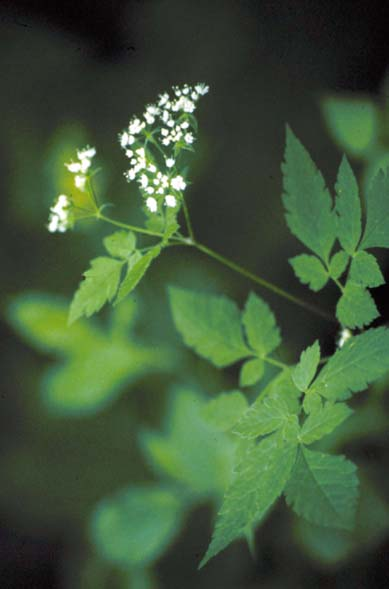

Conservation status
- Secure (NatureServe)

Scientific classification
- Kingdom: Plantae
- Clade: Tracheophytes
- Clade: Angiosperms
- Clade: Eudicots
- Clade: Asterids
- Order: Apiales
- Family: Apiaceae
- Genus: Osmorhiza
- Species: O. claytonii

Binomial name
- Osmorhiza claytonii (Michx.) C.B. Clarke

Synonyms
- Myrrhis claytonii Michx.; Myrrhis claytonii Michx.; Osmorhiza amurensis F. Schmidt ex Maxim.; Osmorhiza claytonii (Michx.) C.B. Clarke; Osmorhiza aristata var. montana Makino; Osmorhiza japonica Siebold & Zucc.; Scandix aristata (Thunb.) Makino; Scandix claytonii (Michx.) Koso-Pol.; Uraspermum aristatum (Thunb.) Kuntze; Washingtonia claytonii (Michx.) Britton

= Osmorhiza claytonii =

Species of flowering plant

Osmorhiza claytonii is a North American perennial herb, native to Canada and the eastern United States. It is also known as Clayton's sweetroot, sweet cicely, or woolly sweet cicely a name it shares with other members of its genus Osmorhiza.

== Description ==
Osmorhiza claytonii is a herbaceous perennial 45–90 centimetres (1–3 ft) tall and pubescent. Leaves are large, compound, deeply divided, and dentate. Flowers are small 1.5 millimetres (0.059 in), white, and clustered with others on a long-stalked umbel. Its native habitats include rich woods and wooded slopes.

The leaves are yellowish green. There are white hairs on the stem and to a lesser extent on the leaves as well. It is ternately branched, having three-leafed branches. When broken it has an anise like smell or flavor.

The seeds of this plant have barbs on the end allowing them to stick to clothing, fur, or feathers.

== Ecology ==
Small to medium-sized bees, wasps, flies, and beetles feed on the nectar and pollen of the flowers. The caterpillars of the butterfly Papilio polyxenes (Black Swallowtail) feed on the foliage.

== Similar species ==
O. claytonii is very similar in appearance to Osmorhiza longistylis (long-styled sweet-cicely) with a similar geographic range. The roots of O. longistylis have a stronger anise smell than those of O. claytonii, and the styles of the flowers protrude beyond the petals, while the styles of O. claytonii are shorter than the petals.
