= Prodoxus californicus =

Scientific classification
- Kingdom: Animalia
- Phylum: Arthropoda
- Clade: Pancrustacea
- Class: Insecta
- Order: Lepidoptera
- Family: Prodoxidae
- Genus: Prodoxus
- Species: P. californicus

Binomial name
- Prodoxus californicus Pellmyr, 2005

Species of moth

Prodoxus californicus is a moth of the family Prodoxidae. It is found along the coast of southern California, United States.

The wingspan is 7.2-10.9 mm for males and 13.1-13.6 mm for females. Adults are on wing in April.

The larvae feed on Yucca schidigera.
