= Prodoxus weethumpi =

Scientific classification
- Kingdom: Animalia
- Phylum: Arthropoda
- Clade: Pancrustacea
- Class: Insecta
- Order: Lepidoptera
- Family: Prodoxidae
- Genus: Prodoxus
- Species: P. weethumpi

Binomial name
- Prodoxus weethumpi Pellmyr, 2005

Species of moth

Prodoxus weethumpi is a moth of the family Prodoxidae. It is found in the United States in the south-western and north-eastern edges of the Mojave Desert in southern California and Nevada, north-western Arizona and south-western Utah.

The wingspan is 8.75-10.6 mm for males and 9.2-13.6 mm for females. Adults are on wing from March to early May.
