= Prodoxus pallidus =

Scientific classification
- Kingdom: Animalia
- Phylum: Arthropoda
- Clade: Pancrustacea
- Class: Insecta
- Order: Lepidoptera
- Family: Prodoxidae
- Genus: Prodoxus
- Species: P. pallidus

Binomial name
- Prodoxus pallidus (Davis, 1967)

Synonyms
- Agavenema pallida Davis, 1967; Agavenema pallidus; Prodoxus pallida

Species of moth

Prodoxus pallidus is a moth of the family Prodoxidae. It is found in southern California, United States. The habitat consists of shrubby desert.

The wingspan is 17–25 mm. The forewings are near white to light gray, with scattered dark brown spots and streaks. The hindwings are medium to dark brown.

The larvae feed on Agave species.
