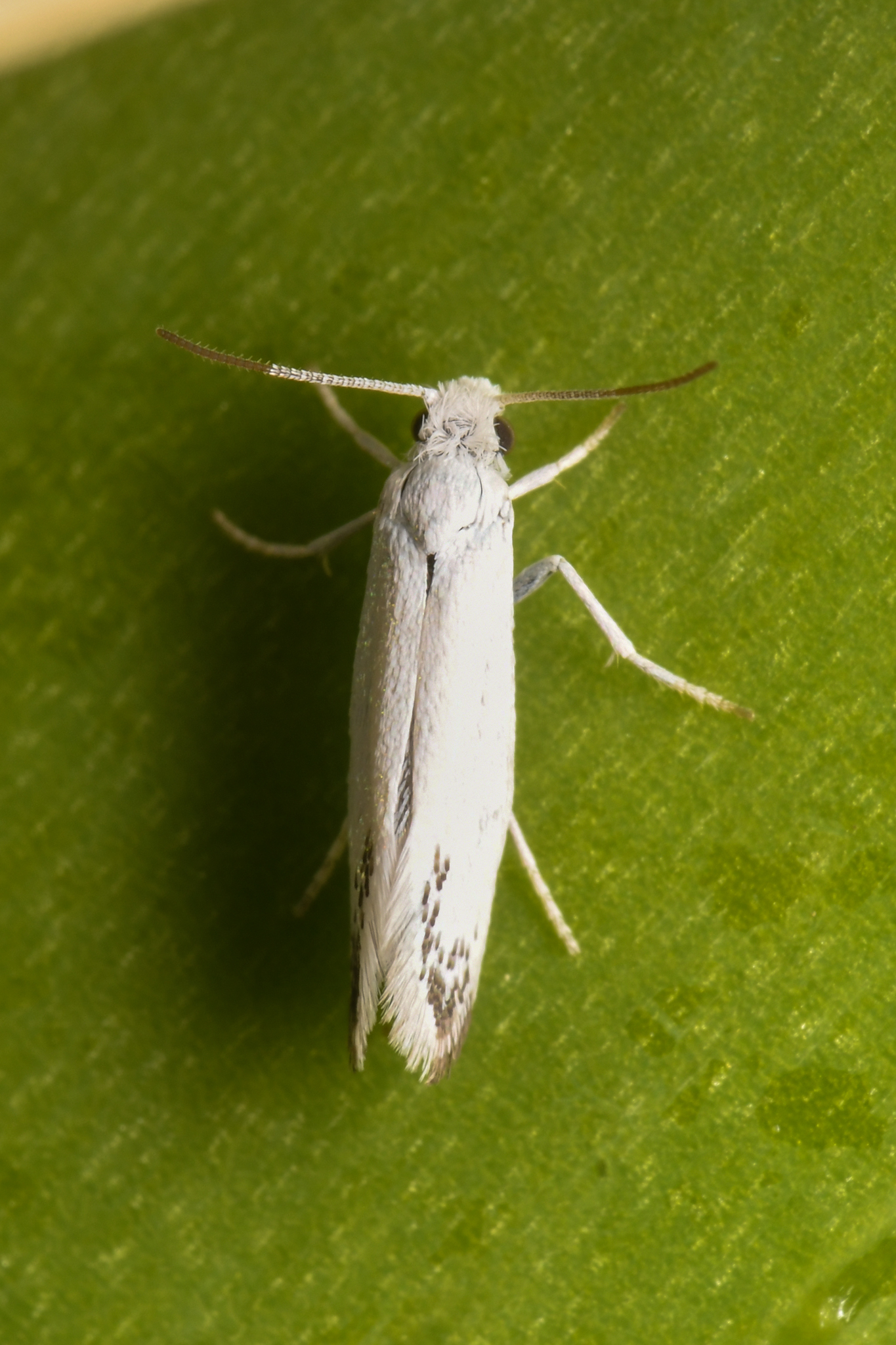

Scientific classification
- Kingdom: Animalia
- Phylum: Arthropoda
- Clade: Pancrustacea
- Class: Insecta
- Order: Lepidoptera
- Family: Prodoxidae
- Genus: Prodoxus
- Species: P. marginatus

Binomial name
- Prodoxus marginatus Riley, 1881

Synonyms
- Prodoxus pulverulentus Riley, 1892

= Prodoxus marginatus =

Species of moth

Prodoxus marginatus is a moth of the family Prodoxidae. It is found in California, United States. The habitat consists of coastal chaparral and montane dry shrubby grassland.

The wingspan is 8–12 mm, making it the smallest Prodoxus species.

The larvae feed on Yucca whipplei.
