= Greya suffusca =

Scientific classification
- Kingdom: Animalia
- Phylum: Arthropoda
- Clade: Pancrustacea
- Class: Insecta
- Order: Lepidoptera
- Family: Prodoxidae
- Genus: Greya
- Species: G. suffusca

Binomial name
- Greya suffusca Davis & Pellmyr, 1992

Species of moth

Greya suffusca is a moth of the family Prodoxidae. It is found in the Sierra Nevada near Sequoia National Park in California. The habitat consists of oak and mixed oak-conifer forest.

The wingspan is 12.5–20 mm.

The larvae feed on Osmorhiza brachypoda. Young larvae feed on the developing seeds of their host plant.
