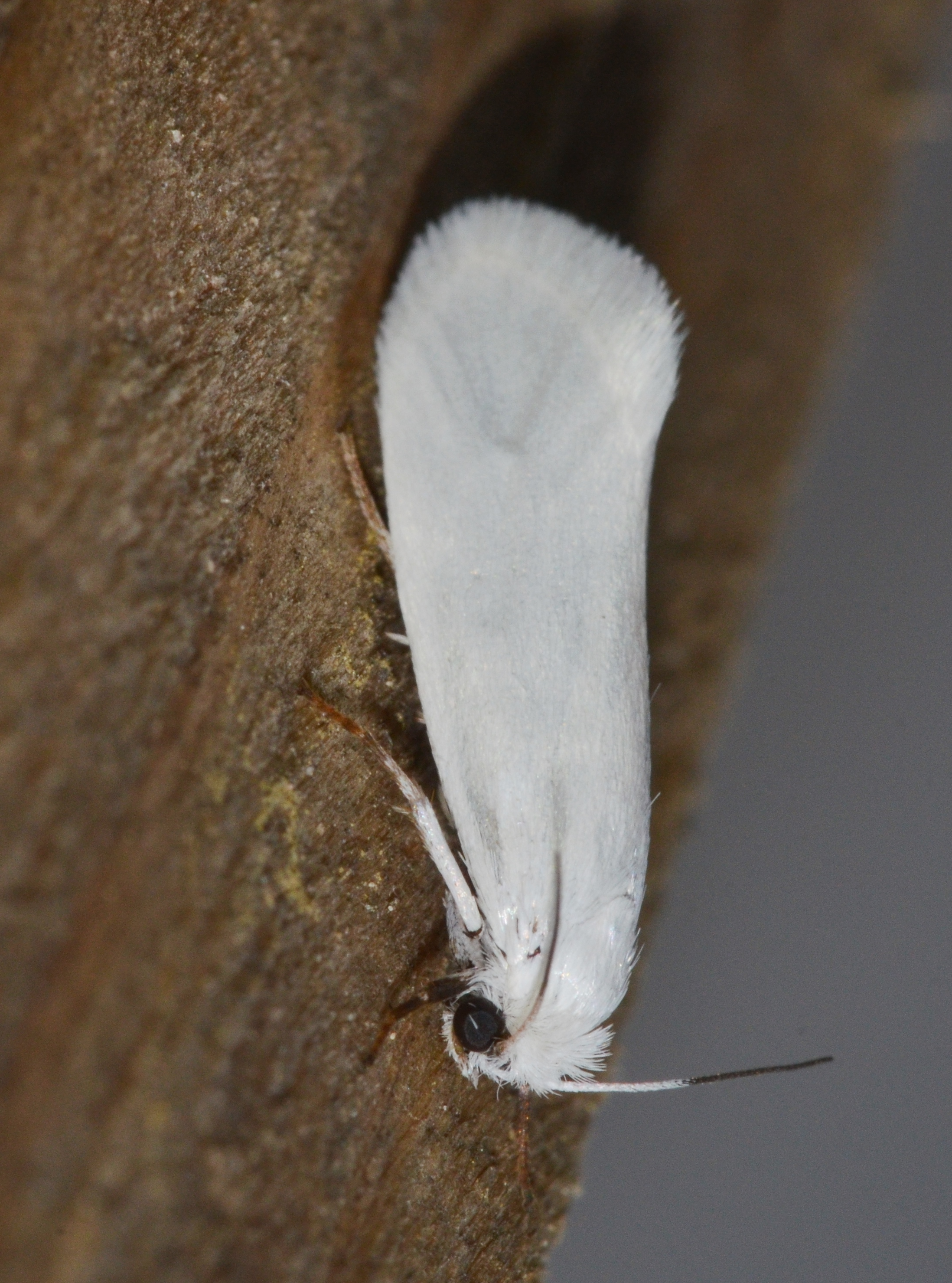

Scientific classification
- Kingdom: Animalia
- Phylum: Arthropoda
- Clade: Pancrustacea
- Class: Insecta
- Order: Lepidoptera
- Family: Prodoxidae
- Genus: Prodoxus
- Species: P. quinquepunctellus

Binomial name
- Prodoxus quinquepunctellus (Chambers, 1875)

Synonyms
- Hyponomeuta quinquepunctella Chambers, 1875; Prodoxus quinquepunctella; Prodoxus paradoxica Chambers, 1878; Prodoxus decipiens Riley, 1880

= Prodoxus quinquepunctellus =

Five-Spotted Bogus Yucca Moth

Species of moth

Prodoxus quinquepunctellus, commonly referred to as the five-spotted bogus yucca moth, is a moth of the family Prodoxidae. It is found from southern Alberta, Canada, to the Mexican Plateau of northern Mexico. Its habitat consists of desert, grassland, openings in pine or deciduous forests and coastal chaparral and dunes.

Discovered in 1875 by American entomologist V.T. Chambers, the five-spotted bogus yucca moth was given the genus Prodoxus to differentiate it from Tegeticula yuccasella, also known as the yucca moth. They were initially thought to be the same species, but were later differentiated due to behavioral and physical distinctions.

The five-spotted bogus yucca moth is currently classified as endangered by the Committee on the Status of Endangered Wildlife in Canada in April 2006. The status of the moth was reassessed in May 2013, but no changes were made.

The wingspan of the moth is roughly 12–23 mm.
