= Prodoxus sonorensis =

Scientific classification
- Kingdom: Animalia
- Phylum: Arthropoda
- Clade: Pancrustacea
- Class: Insecta
- Order: Lepidoptera
- Family: Prodoxidae
- Genus: Prodoxus
- Species: P. sonorensis

Binomial name
- Prodoxus sonorensis Pellmyr & Balcazar-Lara, 2005

Species of moth

Prodoxus sonorensis is a moth of the family Prodoxidae. It is found in south-eastern Arizona, United States, and south into northern Sonora, Mexico.

The wingspan is 8.9-12.8 mm for males and 10.9-15.6 mm for females. Adults are on wing from late June to mid August.

The larvae feed on Yucca schottii.
