= Prodoxus aenescens =

Scientific classification
- Kingdom: Animalia
- Phylum: Arthropoda
- Clade: Pancrustacea
- Class: Insecta
- Order: Lepidoptera
- Family: Prodoxidae
- Genus: Prodoxus
- Species: P. aenescens

Binomial name
- Prodoxus aenescens Riley, 1881

Species of moth

Prodoxus aenescens is a moth of the family Prodoxidae. In North America it is found in central-southern cismontane California, north-western Arizona and Baja California Norte. The habitat consists of coastal chaparral and montane dry shrubby grassland.

The wingspan is 9–15 mm.

The larvae feed on Yucca whipplei.
