= Prodoxus gypsicolor =

Scientific classification
- Kingdom: Animalia
- Phylum: Arthropoda
- Clade: Pancrustacea
- Class: Insecta
- Order: Lepidoptera
- Family: Prodoxidae
- Genus: Prodoxus
- Species: P. gypsicolor

Binomial name
- Prodoxus gypsicolor Pellmyr, 2005

Species of moth

Prodoxus gypsicolor is a moth of the family Prodoxidae. It is found in the United States in the Kingston Range of the north-eastern Mojave Desert and possibly the Grand Canyon National Park in central-northern Arizona.

The wingspan is 11.2-16.2 mm for males and 12-19.1 mm for females. The forewings are calcareous white and the hindwings are brownish gray. Adults are on wing from late March to early April.

The larvae feed on Agave utahensis.

== Etymology ==
The species name refers to the chalk white color of the forewings.
