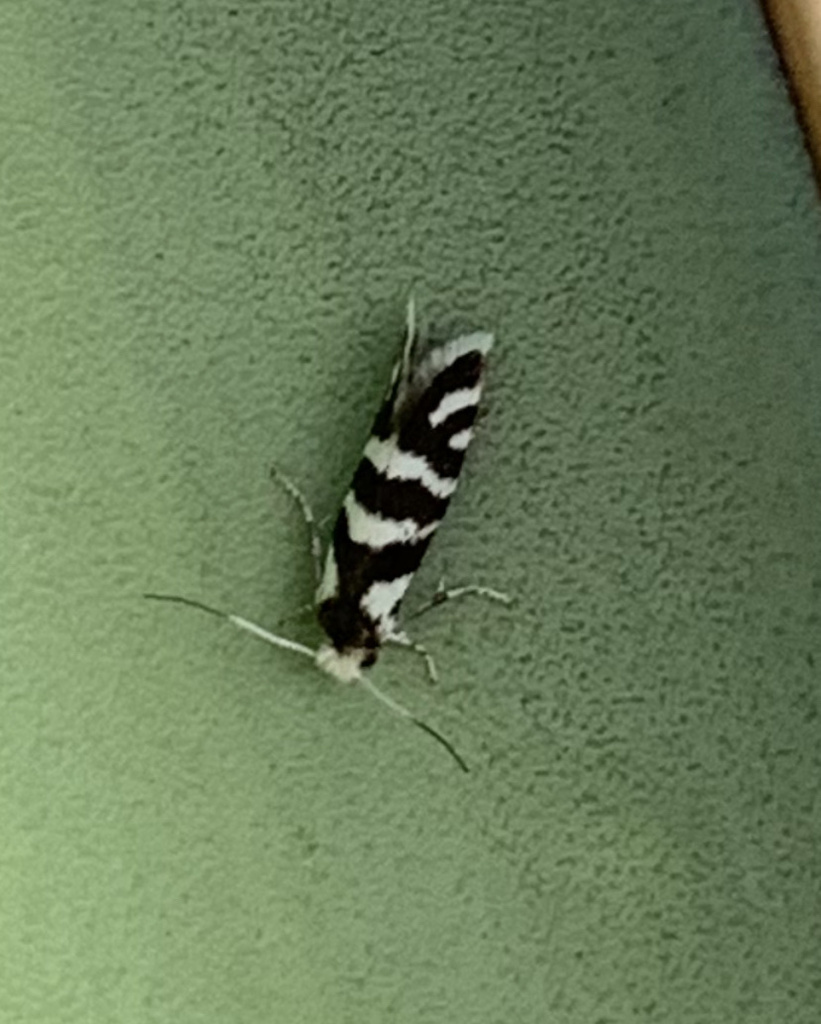

Scientific classification
- Kingdom: Animalia
- Phylum: Arthropoda
- Clade: Pancrustacea
- Class: Insecta
- Order: Lepidoptera
- Family: Prodoxidae
- Genus: Prodoxus
- Species: P. phylloryctus

Binomial name
- Prodoxus phylloryctus Wagner & Powell, 1988

= Prodoxus phylloryctus =

Species of moth

Prodoxus phylloryctus is a moth of the family Prodoxidae. It is found in south-western Colorado, United States. Its habitat consists of open oak-pine forests.

The wingspan ranges from 9–13 mm.

The larvae feed on Yucca baccata, mining the leaves of their host plant.
