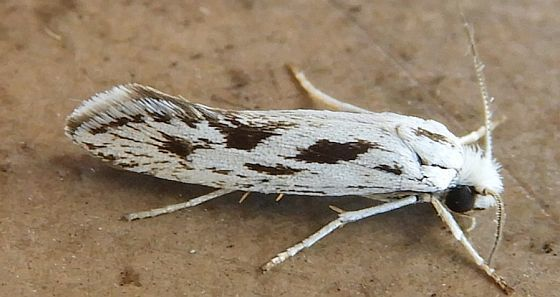

Scientific classification
- Kingdom: Animalia
- Phylum: Arthropoda
- Clade: Pancrustacea
- Class: Insecta
- Order: Lepidoptera
- Family: Prodoxidae
- Genus: Prodoxus
- Species: P. barberellus

Binomial name
- Prodoxus barberellus Busck, 1915

Synonyms
- Prodoxus barberella; Agavenema barberellus; Agavenema barberella

= Prodoxus barberellus =

Species of moth

Prodoxus barberellus is a moth of the family Prodoxidae. It is found in south-eastern Arizona. The habitat consists of shrubby desert.

The larvae feed on Agave palmeri.
