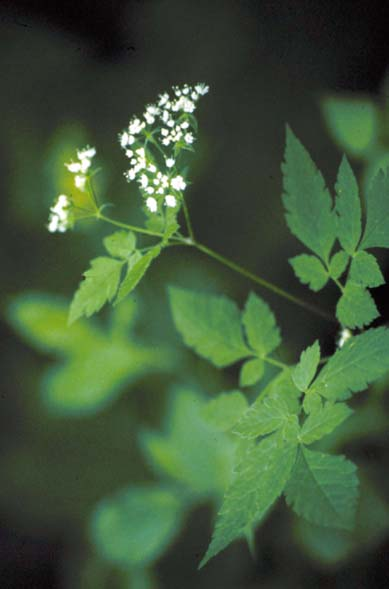
- Osmorhiza claytonii

Scientific classification
- Kingdom: Plantae
- Clade: Tracheophytes
- Clade: Angiosperms
- Clade: Eudicots
- Clade: Asterids
- Order: Apiales
- Family: Apiaceae
- Subfamily: Apioideae
- Tribe: Scandiceae
- Subtribe: Scandicinae
- Genus: Osmorhiza; Raf. 1819

Species
- See text

= Osmorhiza =

Genus of flowering plants

Osmorhiza is a genus of perennial herbs, known generally as sweet cicely, sweetcicely, or sweetroot. Most species are native to North America, but some grow in South America and Asia. Some species are used for medicinal purposes, but have dangerous lookalikes. The fruits of this plant have barbs on the end allowing them to stick to clothing, fur, or feathers.

American Indians used the roots of sweet cicely as a panacea. It was used as a tonic for upset stomachs and to ease childbirth. The root was poulticed on boils and wounds, and a root tea was used as an eye wash. Folk medicine lists uses of the plant as an expectorant and as a tonic for coughs and for stomachaches.

== Species ==
- Osmorhiza aristata
- Osmorhiza berteroi (Tapering sweetroot, mountain sweet cicely, mountain sweetroot)
- Osmorhiza brachypoda (California sweet cicely)
- Osmorhiza claytonii (Clayton's sweetroot, sweet cicely)
- Osmorhiza depauperata (Bluntseed sweetroot)
- Osmorhiza glabrata
- Osmorhiza longistylis (American sweet cicely, sweet cicely, white cicely, longstyle sweetroot, aniseroot, licorice root, or wild anise)
- Osmorhiza mexicana (Mexican sweet cicely)
- Osmorhiza occidentalis (Western sweetroot)
- Osmorhiza purpurea (Purple sweetroot)
