= Prodoxus coloradensis =

Scientific classification
- Kingdom: Animalia
- Phylum: Arthropoda
- Clade: Pancrustacea
- Class: Insecta
- Order: Lepidoptera
- Family: Prodoxidae
- Genus: Prodoxus
- Species: P. coloradensis

Binomial name
- Prodoxus coloradensis Riley, 1892

Synonyms
- Prodoxus lautus Cockerell, 1897; Prodoxus confluens Cockerell, 1897; Incurvaria rheumapterella Dietz, 1905

Species of moth

Prodoxus coloradensis is a moth of the family Prodoxidae. In North America it is found from the Colorado Plateau in the north to northern Sonora in the south, east to the Big Bend region of Texas and west to the coastal range of southern California.

The wingspan is 8.9–12 mm for males and 9.2–13 mm for females. Adults are on wing from April to June.

The larvae feed on Yucca baccata, Yucca arizonica and Yucca schidigera.
