= Prodoxus tehuacanensis =

Scientific classification
- Kingdom: Animalia
- Phylum: Arthropoda
- Clade: Pancrustacea
- Class: Insecta
- Order: Lepidoptera
- Family: Prodoxidae
- Genus: Prodoxus
- Species: P. tehuacanensis

Binomial name
- Prodoxus tehuacanensis Pellmyr & Balcazar-Lara, 2005

Species of moth

Prodoxus tehuacanensis is a moth of the family Prodoxidae. It is found in Mexico in the Tehuacán-Cuicatlán region of Puebla and Oaxaca.

The wingspan is 8.3-11.25 mm for males and 9.2-11.6 mm for females. Adults are on wing in late April.
