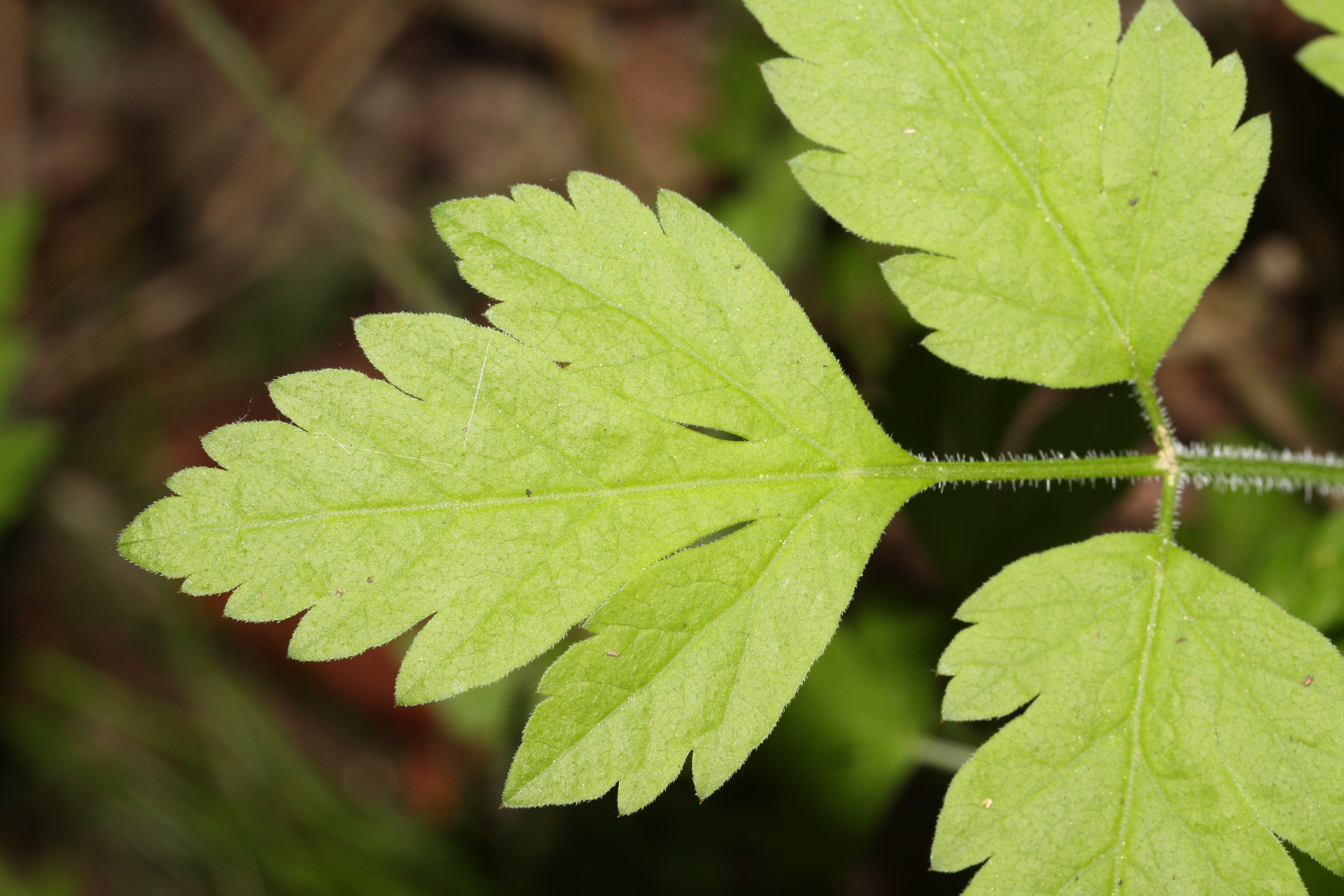

Conservation status
- Secure (NatureServe)

Scientific classification
- Kingdom: Plantae
- Clade: Tracheophytes
- Clade: Angiosperms
- Clade: Eudicots
- Clade: Asterids
- Order: Apiales
- Family: Apiaceae
- Genus: Osmorhiza
- Species: O. berteroi

Binomial name
- Osmorhiza berteroi DC.

Synonyms
- Osmorhiza brevipes Osmorhiza chilensis Osmorhiza divaricata Osmorhiza nuda Washingtonia divaricata

= Osmorhiza berteroi =

Species of flowering plant

Osmorhiza berteroi is a species of flowering plant in the family Apiaceae known by the common name mountain sweet cicely.

== Systematics ==
Osmorhiza berteroi forms a species complex together with O. depauperata and O. purpurea. Until recently these were all treated as O. chilensis, but a revision resulted in the 3 species being split, and also revealed that O. chilensis, published in December 1830 by Hooker and Arnott was a junior synonym of O. berteroi, published in September of the same year by De Candolle.

Studies of both chloroplast and nuclear DNA confirm that the various populations of O. berteroi are monophyletic.

== Distribution ==
It has an amphitropical distribution being native to both temperate parts of North and South America. In the Northern Hemisphere it is found boreal zones from Alaska to Newfoundland, extending south to South Dakota, and in mountain ranges adjacent to the Pacific coast from the Alaska panhandle to California and Arizona. In South America it occurs in Magellanic forests in Argentina and Chile.

The amphitropical distribution is believed to have arisen recently (in the past 1 million years), probably by seeds attached to the feathers of migratory birds. In contrast, the east–west disjunct distribution are most likely relict populations of a once continuous range.

== Habitat ==
It grows in wooded and forested areas. In the Great Lakes area O. berteroi is found in hardwood forests dominated by Sugar Maple

== Biology ==
Osmorhiza berteroi is a short-lived perennial. It usually flowers in late Spring (June in Minnesota, October to December in Chile). It is insect-pollinated, with seed being distributed by animals, typically by attaching to the fur of mammals (epizoochory).

=== Associated organisms ===
The larvae of a prodoxid moth restricted to California, Greya reticulata, feed on fruits of O. berteroi.

== Description ==
It is an aromatic perennial herb producing a branching stem which may exceed a meter tall. The plentiful green leaves have blades up to 20 centimeters long which are divided into three leaflets (trifoliate), which are toothed or lobed. The blade is borne on a long petiole. The inflorescence is a compound umbel of many tiny white flowers at the tip of a stemlike peduncle. There are 4–10 florets on each umbellule with the central florets only possessing anthers. The narrow, elongated fruit is ribbed and bristly, measuring up to 2.5 centimeters long.

=== Similar species ===
Osmorhiza berteroi occurs alongside several other species of Osmorhiza throughout its range, but is most likely to be confused with O. depaurerata. The two species are very similar and most easily separated by examining the seeds

== Relationship with humans ==
=== Use for food and medicine ===
Osmorhiza berteroi was used as a source of food by several groups of Native Americans in all parts of its native range. These included the Selkʼnam people in what is now Chile, and tribes of the Great Plains, such as the Cheyenne and Blackfoot. The root was eaten, and also used as a medicinal treatment for coughs and colds.

=== Conservation ===
It is not threatened in most parts of its range. However some disjunct populations in eastern North America are isolated, and the typical habitat is fragmented and prone to destruction.

=== Garden plant ===
It can be used as ground cover in shady places. Hardy in USDA zones 5–9.
