= Prodoxus mapimiensis =

Scientific classification
- Kingdom: Animalia
- Phylum: Arthropoda
- Clade: Pancrustacea
- Class: Insecta
- Order: Lepidoptera
- Family: Prodoxidae
- Genus: Prodoxus
- Species: P. mapimiensis

Binomial name
- Prodoxus mapimiensis Pellmyr & Balcazar-Lara, 2005

Species of moth

Prodoxus mapimiensis is a moth of the family Prodoxidae. It is found in Mexico in the Chihuahuan Desert, from Saltillo-Torre north to the Big Bend region of western Texas, United States.

The wingspan is 7.3–10.9 millimetres (0.29–0.43 in) for males and 8.8–12 millimetres (0.35–0.47 in) for females.
