= Prodoxus intricatus =

Scientific classification
- Kingdom: Animalia
- Phylum: Arthropoda
- Clade: Pancrustacea
- Class: Insecta
- Order: Lepidoptera
- Family: Prodoxidae
- Genus: Prodoxus
- Species: P. intricatus

Binomial name
- Prodoxus intricatus Riley, 1893

Species of insect

Prodoxus intricatus is a moth of the family Prodoxidae. It is found in Mexico in Veracruz and Oaxaca.

The wingspan is 13–16 mm. The forewings are dark brown with a violet sheen and about five to eight yellow spots. The hindwings are uniform brown.

The larvae feed on Yucca elephantipes. They probably bore in the floral rachis of their host plant.
