= Prodoxus carnerosanellus =

Scientific classification
- Kingdom: Animalia
- Phylum: Arthropoda
- Clade: Pancrustacea
- Class: Insecta
- Order: Lepidoptera
- Family: Prodoxidae
- Genus: Prodoxus
- Species: P. carnerosanellus

Binomial name
- Prodoxus carnerosanellus Pellmyr & Balcazar-Lara, 2005

Species of moth

Prodoxus carnerosanellus is a moth of the family Prodoxidae. It is found in the Big Bend region of western Texas, United States. It is probably also present in Mexico.

The wingspan is 8.1-10.9 mm for males and 8.9-12.8 mm for females.

== Etymology ==
The species name is derived from its only known host, Yucca carnerosana.
