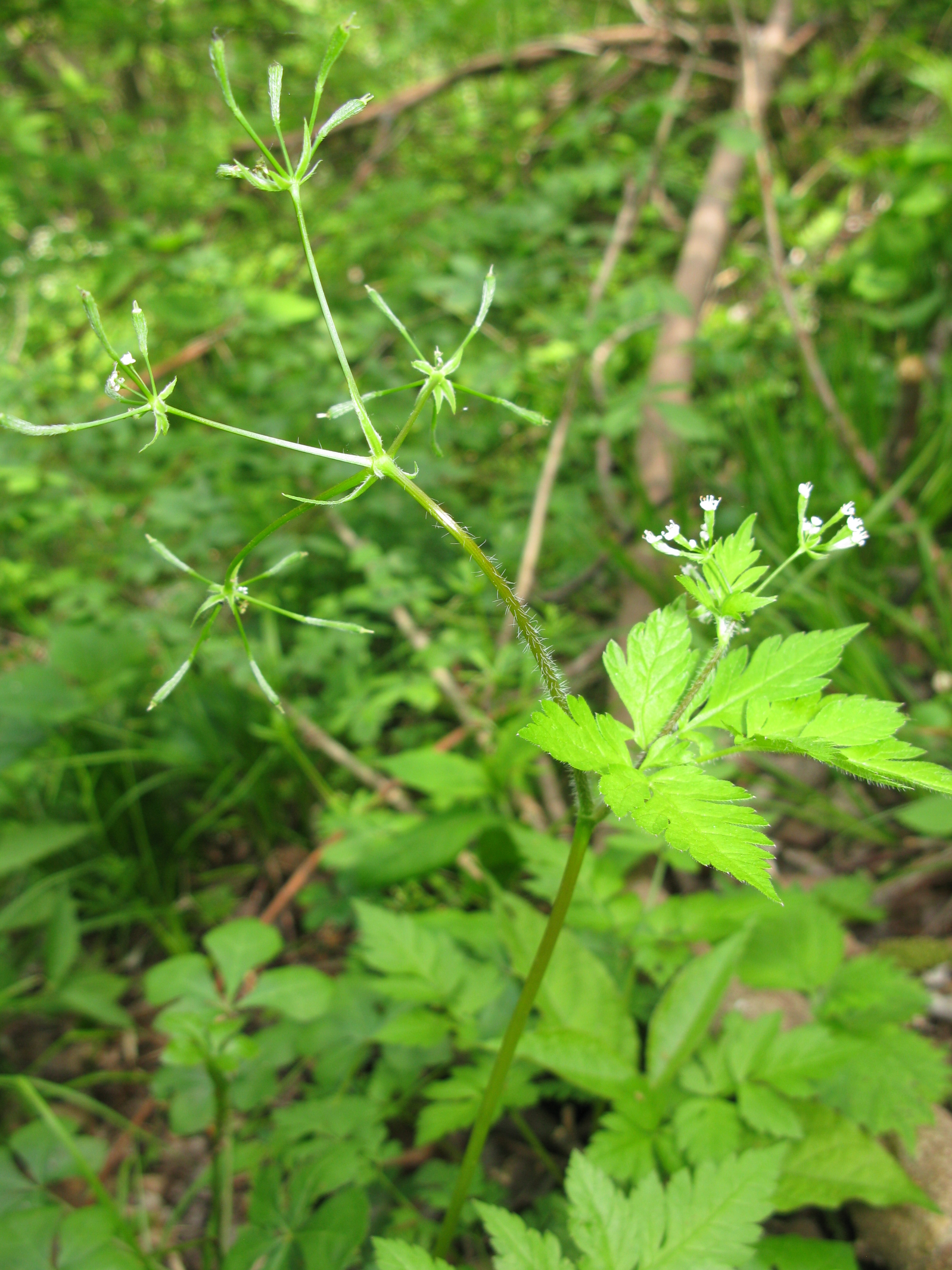
- Osmorhiza aristata in Fukushima Prefecture.

Scientific classification
- Kingdom: Plantae
- Clade: Embryophytes
- Clade: Tracheophytes
- Clade: Spermatophytes
- Clade: Angiosperms
- Clade: Eudicots
- Clade: Asterids
- Order: Apiales
- Family: Apiaceae
- Genus: Osmorhiza
- Species: O. aristata

Binomial name
- Osmorhiza aristata Thunb.

= Osmorhiza aristata =

Perennial species of flowering plant

Osmorhiza aristata (Chinese: 香根芹, Japanese: 藪人参) is a perennial plant belonging to the genus Osmorhiza, in the family Apiaceae. It is native to East Asia.

== Description ==
The stems are upright, reaching a height of 25 to 70 cm (9.8 to 28 in), and the leaves, which are oval and have serrated edges, are 7 to 30 cm (2.8 to 12 in)long.

The flowering season is from April to July, and it is pollinated by insects. The seeds of the perennial plant ripen from June to July.

== Distribution ==
The plant is endemic to Eastern Asia, particularly China, Korea and Japan, where it grows on the sides of mountains and stream banks at elevations between 200 and 3,500 meters (660 and 11,480 ft), shaded by bushes and other plants.
