= Prodoxus cinereus =

Scientific classification
- Kingdom: Animalia
- Phylum: Arthropoda
- Clade: Pancrustacea
- Class: Insecta
- Order: Lepidoptera
- Family: Prodoxidae
- Genus: Prodoxus
- Species: P. cinereus

Binomial name
- Prodoxus cinereus Riley, 1881

Species of moth

Prodoxus cinereus is a moth of the family Prodoxidae. It is found from Los Angeles in the United States south to the border with Mexico. The habitat consists of coastal chaparral and montane dry shrubby grassland.

The wingspan is 9–15 mm.

The larvae feed on Yucca whipplei. They feed primarily in the basal portion of the inflorescence stalk.
