= Prodoxus sordidus =

Scientific classification
- Kingdom: Animalia
- Phylum: Arthropoda
- Clade: Pancrustacea
- Class: Insecta
- Order: Lepidoptera
- Family: Prodoxidae
- Genus: Prodoxus
- Species: P. sordidus

Binomial name
- Prodoxus sordidus Riley, 1892

Species of moth

Prodoxus sordidus is a moth of the family Prodoxidae. It is found in the United States in the Mojave Desert in south-eastern California, north-western Arizona and southern Nevada.

The wingspan is 8–9.8 mm for males and 9.4-12.3 for females. Adults are on wing from March to mid-May.
