= Prodoxus y-inversus =

Scientific classification
- Kingdom: Animalia
- Phylum: Arthropoda
- Clade: Pancrustacea
- Class: Insecta
- Order: Lepidoptera
- Family: Prodoxidae
- Genus: Prodoxus
- Species: P. y-inversus

Binomial name
- Prodoxus y-inversus Riley, 1892

Synonyms
- Prodoxus y-inversum

Species of moth

Prodoxus y-inversus is a moth of the family Prodoxidae. It is found in the United States in south-western New Mexico, south-eastern Arizona and southern Nevada. The habitat consists of shrubby desert and open forests.

The wingspan is 11–16 mm. Adults are on wing from April to May.

The larvae feed on Yucca baccata and Yucca schottii.
