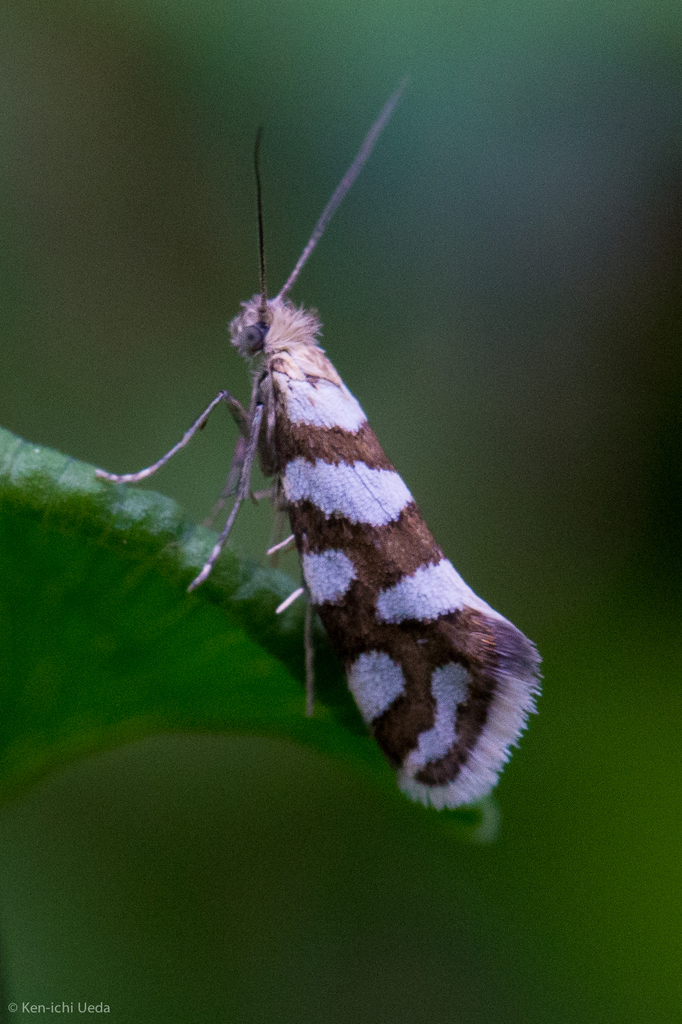

Scientific classification
- Kingdom: Animalia
- Phylum: Arthropoda
- Clade: Pancrustacea
- Class: Insecta
- Order: Lepidoptera
- Family: Prodoxidae
- Genus: Greya
- Species: G. reticulata

Binomial name
- Greya reticulata (Riley, 1892)

Synonyms
- Prodoxus reticulata Riley, 1892

= Greya reticulata =

Species of moth

Greya reticulata is a moth of the family Prodoxidae. It is found from the coastal range of California in the United States.

The wingspan is 9–15.5 mm.

The larvae feed on Osmorhiza chilensis. Young larvae feed on the developing seeds of their host plant.
