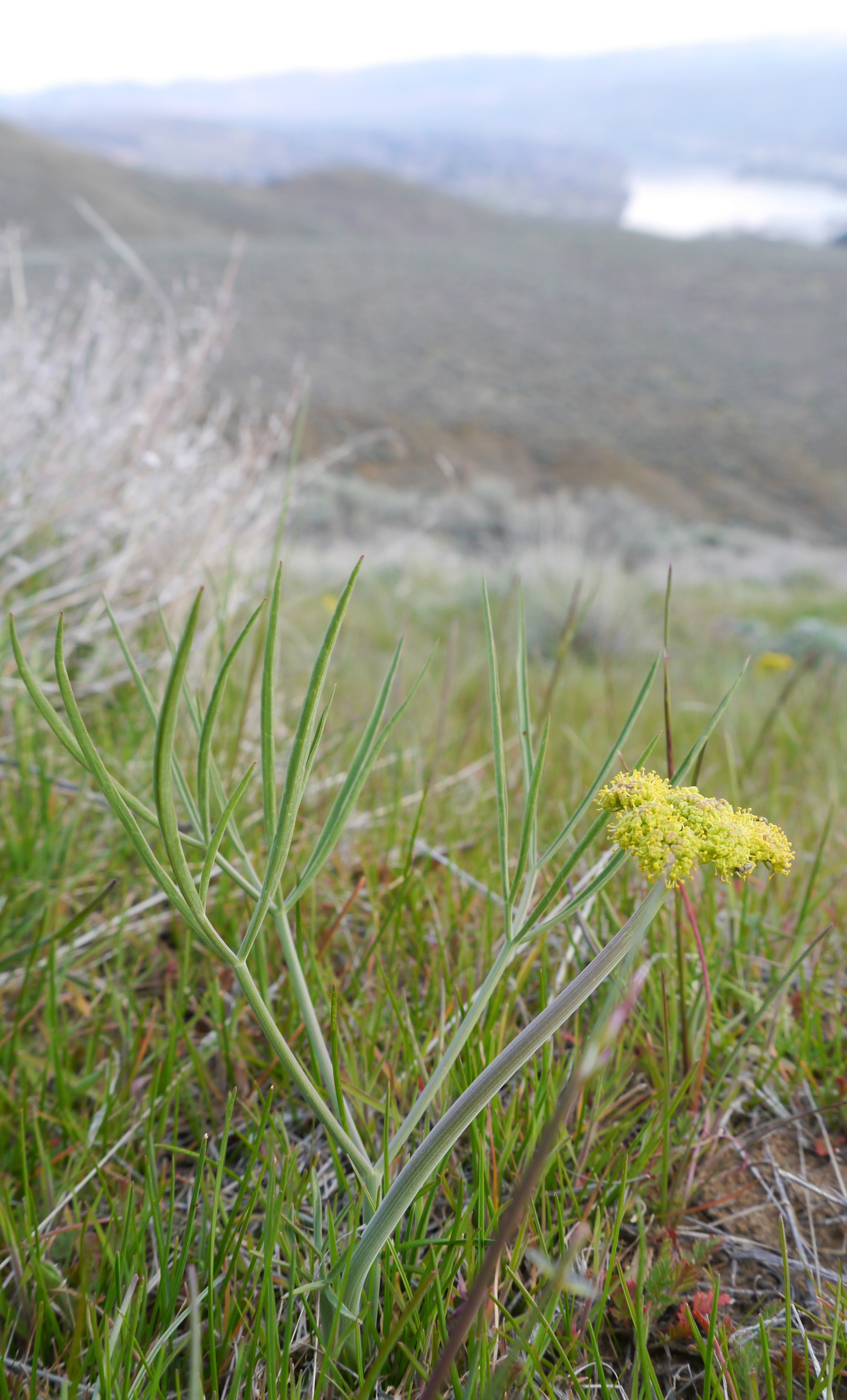
- Lomatium triternatum var. triternatum on Burch Mountain, Chelan County Washington

Conservation status
- Secure (NatureServe)

Scientific classification
- Kingdom: Plantae
- Clade: Tracheophytes
- Clade: Angiosperms
- Clade: Eudicots
- Clade: Asterids
- Order: Apiales
- Family: Apiaceae
- Genus: Lomatium
- Species: L. triternatum

Binomial name
- Lomatium triternatum (Pursh) J.M.Coult. & Rose

= Lomatium triternatum =

Species of flowering plant

Lomatium triternatum is a species of flowering plant in the carrot family known by the common name nineleaf biscuitroot. It is native to western North America from British Columbia to California to Colorado, where it grows in many types of habitat. It is a hairy perennial herb growing up to a meter tall from a taproot. The leaves emerge from the lower part of the stem. Each is generally divided into three leaflets which are each subdivided into three linear leaflike segments. The inflorescence is an umbel of yellow flowers, each cluster on a ray up to 10 centimeters long, altogether forming a flat formation of umbels.

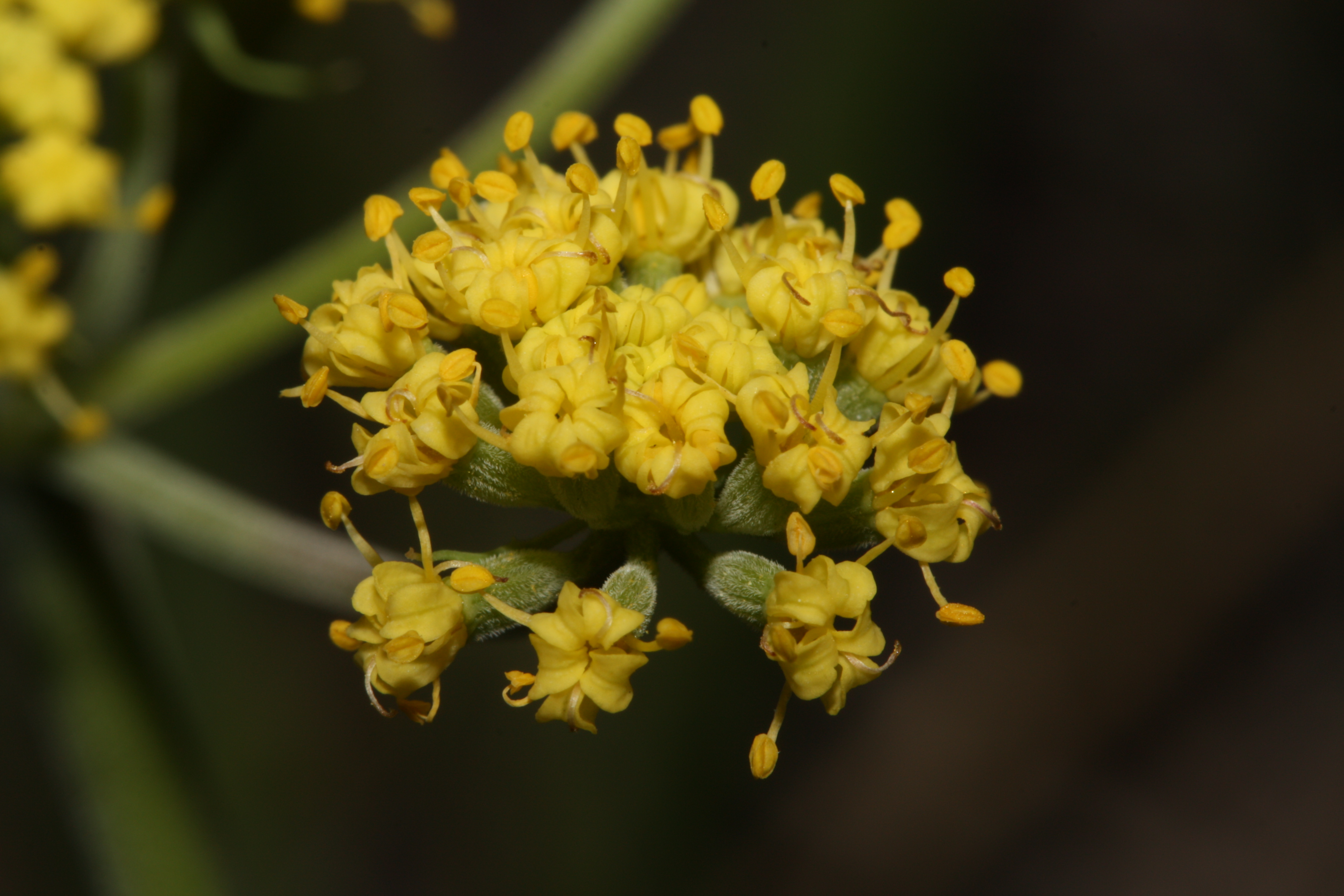
Flower cluster (Wenas Wildlife Area)
