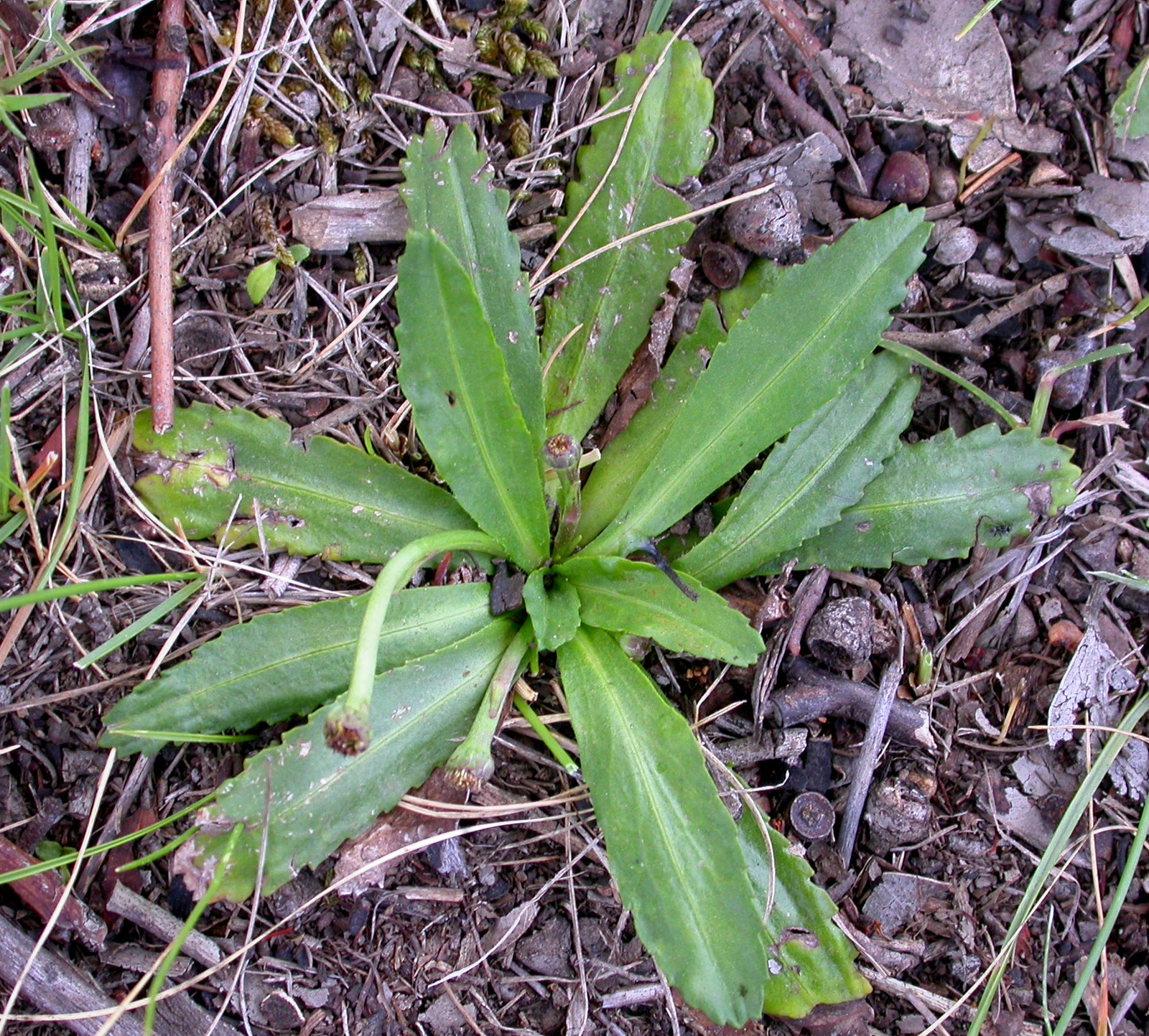
- Solenogyne dominii

Scientific classification
- Kingdom: Plantae
- Clade: Tracheophytes
- Clade: Angiosperms
- Clade: Eudicots
- Clade: Asterids
- Order: Asterales
- Family: Asteraceae
- Subfamily: Asteroideae
- Tribe: Astereae
- Subtribe: Lagenophorinae
- Genus: Solenogyne; Cass.

Type species
- Solenogyne bellioides Cass.

Synonyms
- Emphysopus Hook.f.; Lagenophora sect. Solenogyne Maiden & Betche

= Solenogyne =

Genus of plants

Solenogyne is a genus of Australian plants in the tribe Astereae within the family Asteraceae.

Species

- Solenogyne bellioides Cass. - New South Wales, Queensland
- Solenogyne dominii L.G.Adams - New South Wales, South Australia, Tasmania, Victoria; naturalized in New Zealand
- Solenogyne gunnii (Hook.f.) Cabrera - New South Wales, Tasmania, Victoria; naturalized in New Zealand

formerly included

see Lagenophora

- Solenogyne mikadoi - Lagenophora mikadoi
