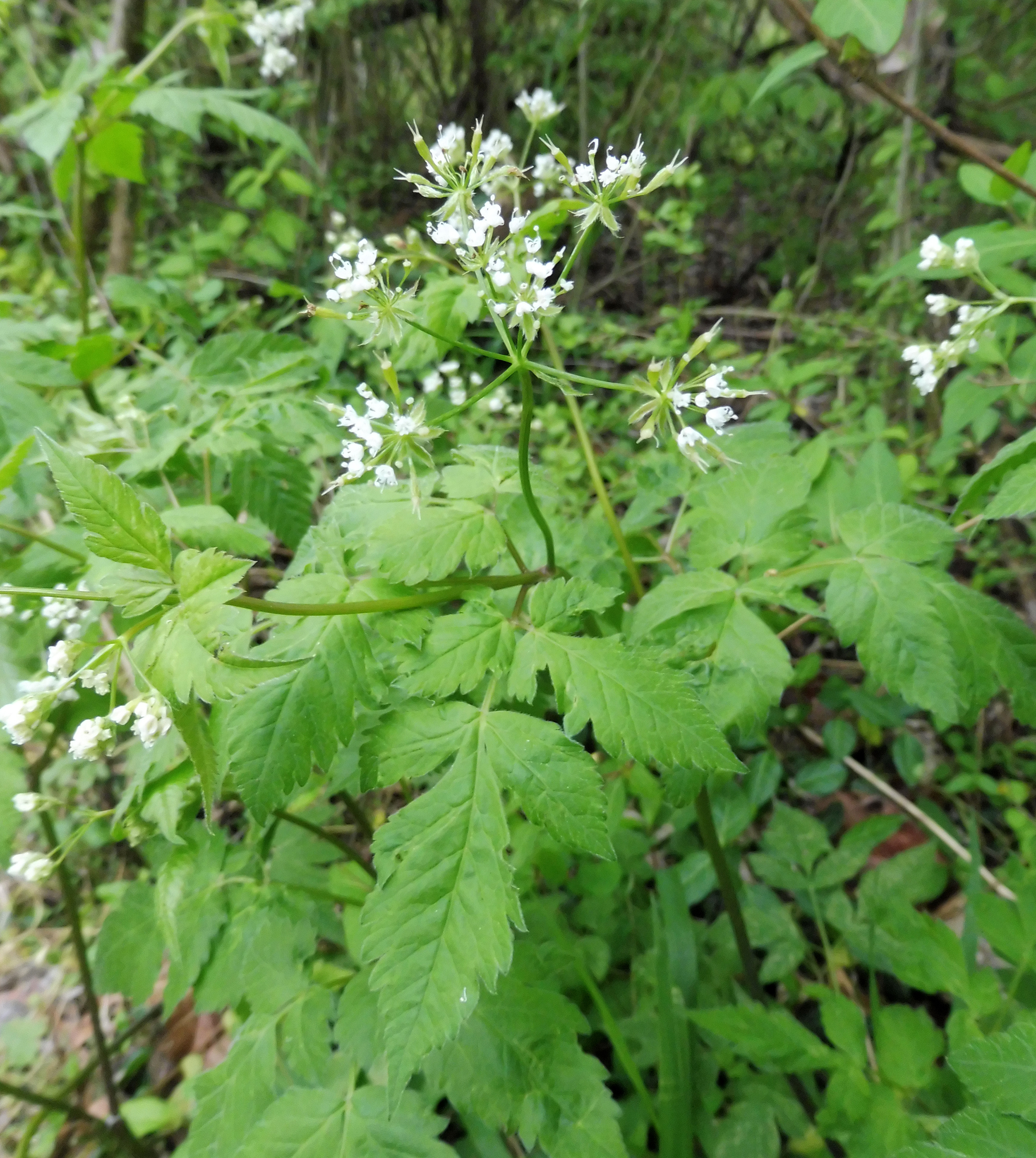

Conservation status
- Secure (NatureServe)

Scientific classification
- Kingdom: Plantae
- Clade: Tracheophytes
- Clade: Angiosperms
- Clade: Eudicots
- Clade: Asterids
- Order: Apiales
- Family: Apiaceae
- Genus: Osmorhiza
- Species: O. longistylis

Binomial name
- Osmorhiza longistylis (Torr.) DC.

= Osmorhiza longistylis =

Species of flowering plant

Osmorhiza longistylis, commonly called long-styled sweet-cicely or longstyle sweetroot, is an herbaceous plant in the family Apiaceae. It is native to North America, where it is found from the Rocky Mountains east to the Atlantic Coast, in Canada and the United States. Its natural habitat is in forests with fertile soil, often in areas of loam and dappled sunlight. It can be found in areas of high or average quality natural communities, and does not tolerate intense disturbance.

It is an herbaceous perennial that grows to two and a half feet tall. It produces umbels of small white flowers in late spring and early summer. The crushed plant has a distinct scent of anise.

== Uses ==
The roots have occasionally been used as a culinary substitute for anise. This species was also used historically by Native Americans as a medicinal herb.

== Ecology ==
Small to medium-sized bees, wasps, flies, and beetles feed on the nectar and pollen of the flowers. The caterpillars of the butterfly Papilio polyxenes (Black Swallowtail) feed on the foliage.

== Similar species ==
O. longistylis is very similar in appearance to Osmorhiza claytonii (sweet cicely) with a similar geographic range. The roots of O. longistylis have a stronger anise smell than those of O. claytonii, and the styles of the flowers protrude beyond the petals, while the styles of O. claytonii are shorter than the petals.
