= Lomatium bicolor =

- Flowering west side of the Sierra Madre Range, northeast of Reader Basin, Wyoming

Conservation status
- Apparently Secure (NatureServe)

Scientific classification
- Kingdom: Plantae
- Clade: Tracheophytes
- Clade: Angiosperms
- Clade: Eudicots
- Clade: Asterids
- Order: Apiales
- Family: Apiaceae
- Genus: Lomatium
- Species: L. bicolor

Binomial name
- Lomatium bicolor (S.Watson) J.M.Coult. & Rose

Synonyms
- Cogswellia bicolor; Peucedanum bicolor

Plant species in the parsley family

Lomatium bicolor (Wasatch desertparsley) is an herb of the parsley family from the western United States.

It is 20–50 cm tall and the stems are split at the ground. Lomatium bicolor has glabrous, or mildly scabrous, compound umbels with yellow flowers that have relatively wide petals. The petioles are 9–14 cm long.

== Taxonomy ==
In 1871 a new species in the genus Peucedanum was described by Sereno Watson, naming it Peucedanum bicolor. The botanists John Merle Coulter and Joseph Nelson Rose published a description of the species moving it to Lomatium, creating its accepted name. Until the 2024 publication of the volume 13 of the Flora of North America Lomatium leptocarpum was often included in Lomatium bicolor as variety leptocarpum. It continues to be listed as a variety in the USDA plants database. The species has three synonyms.

Table of Synonyms
Name	Year	Rank	Notes
Cogswellia bicolor (S.Watson) M.E.Jones	1908	species	≡ hom.
Peucedanum bicolor S.Watson	1871	species	≡ hom.
Peucedanum bicolor var. gumbonis M.E.Jones	1902	variety	= het.
Notes: ≡ homotypic synonym ; = heterotypic synonym

== Range ==
The according to Plants of the World Online bicolor biscuitroot is native to Utah, Wyoming, and Idaho. However, NatureServe also reports it as growing in Colorado.
