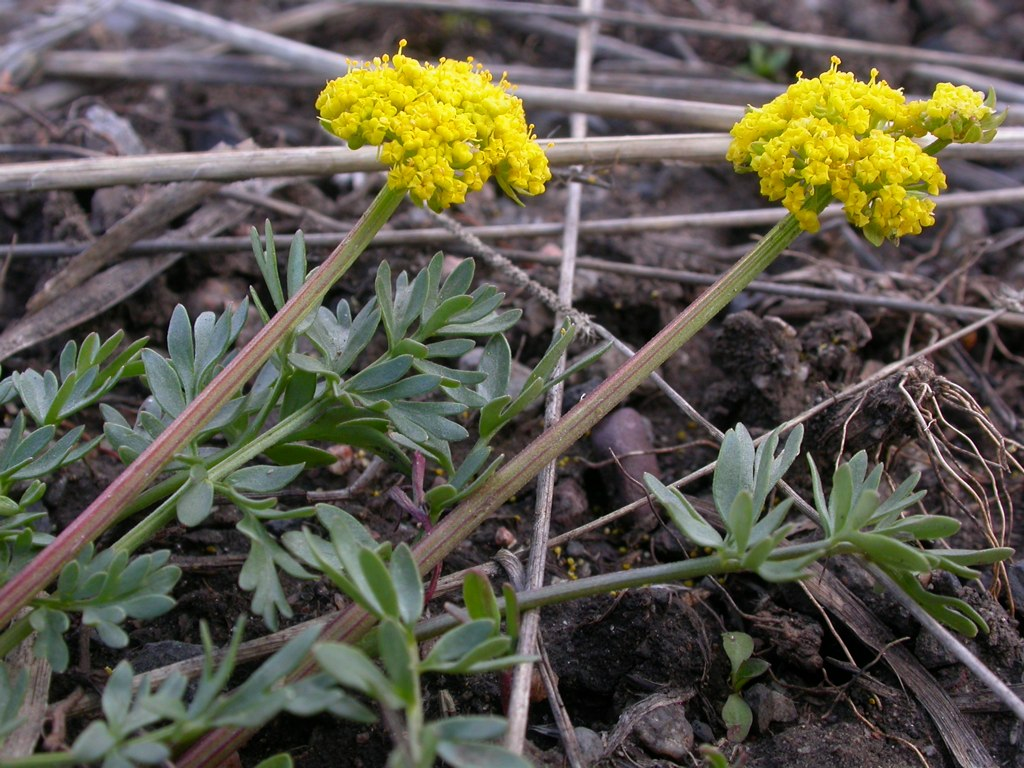

Scientific classification
- Kingdom: Plantae
- Clade: Tracheophytes
- Clade: Angiosperms
- Clade: Eudicots
- Clade: Asterids
- Order: Apiales
- Family: Apiaceae
- Genus: Lomatium
- Species: L. cous

Binomial name
- Lomatium cous (S.Watson) J.M.Coult. & Rose

= Lomatium cous =

Species of flowering plant

Lomatium cous (cous biscuitroot) is a perennial herb of the family Apiaceae. The root is prized as a food by the tribes of the southern plateau of the Pacific Northwest. Meriwether Lewis collected a specimen in 1806 while on his expedition.

It is called x̣áwš in the Sahaptin language, and qáamsit (when fresh) and qáaws (when peeled and dried) in the Nez Perce language.

It is called shappelell by the Chinooks: "... and a kind of bisquit, which the natives make of roots called by them shappelell."—Meriwether Lewis, Friday, January 9, 1806. From The Definitive Journals of Lewis & Clark, Down the Columbia to Fort Clatsop. Volume 6 of the Nebraska Edition. Gary E. Moulton, Editor. University of Nebraska Press, Lincoln, 1990.
