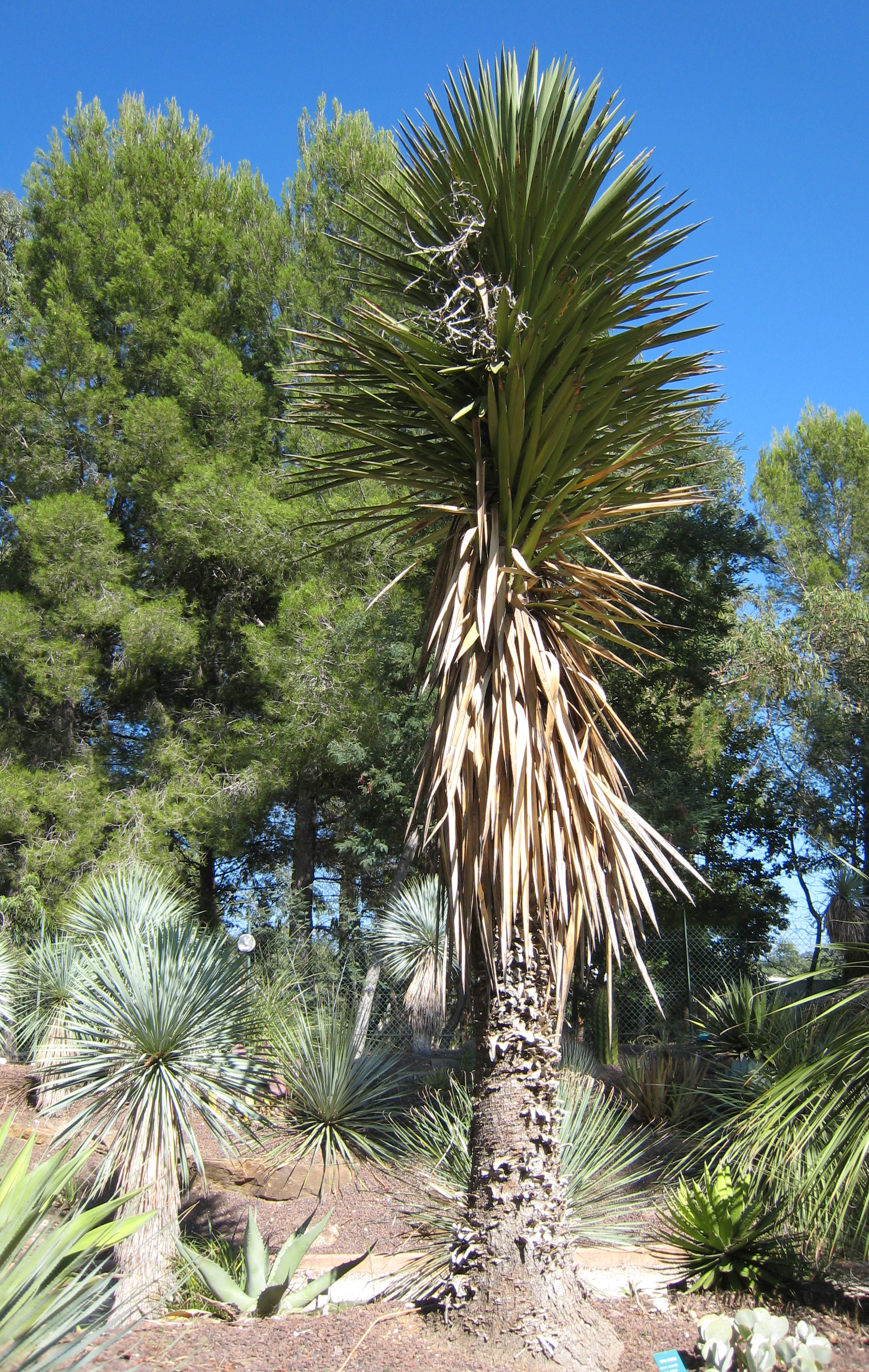

Conservation status
- Least Concern (IUCN 3.1)

Scientific classification
- Kingdom: Plantae
- Clade: Tracheophytes
- Clade: Angiosperms
- Clade: Monocots
- Order: Asparagales
- Family: Asparagaceae
- Subfamily: Agavoideae
- Genus: Yucca
- Species: Y. filifera

Binomial name
- Yucca filifera Chabaud

Synonyms
- Yucca australis (Engelm.) Trel.; Yucca baccata var. filifera (Chabaud) Schelle; Yucca canaliculata var. filifera (Chabaud) Fenzl

= Yucca filifera =

Species of flowering plant

Yucca filifera is a member of the subfamily Agavaceae, family Asparagaceae, native to central Mexico.

== History ==
Merchant and explorer Josiah Gregg discovered it in 1840 in northeastern Mexico between Saltillo and Parras (23°37′0″N 102°34′30″W) on 19 May 1847. It was later introduced to Europe and described for science by J. Benjamin Chabaud (1833-1915) in 1876.

== Description ==
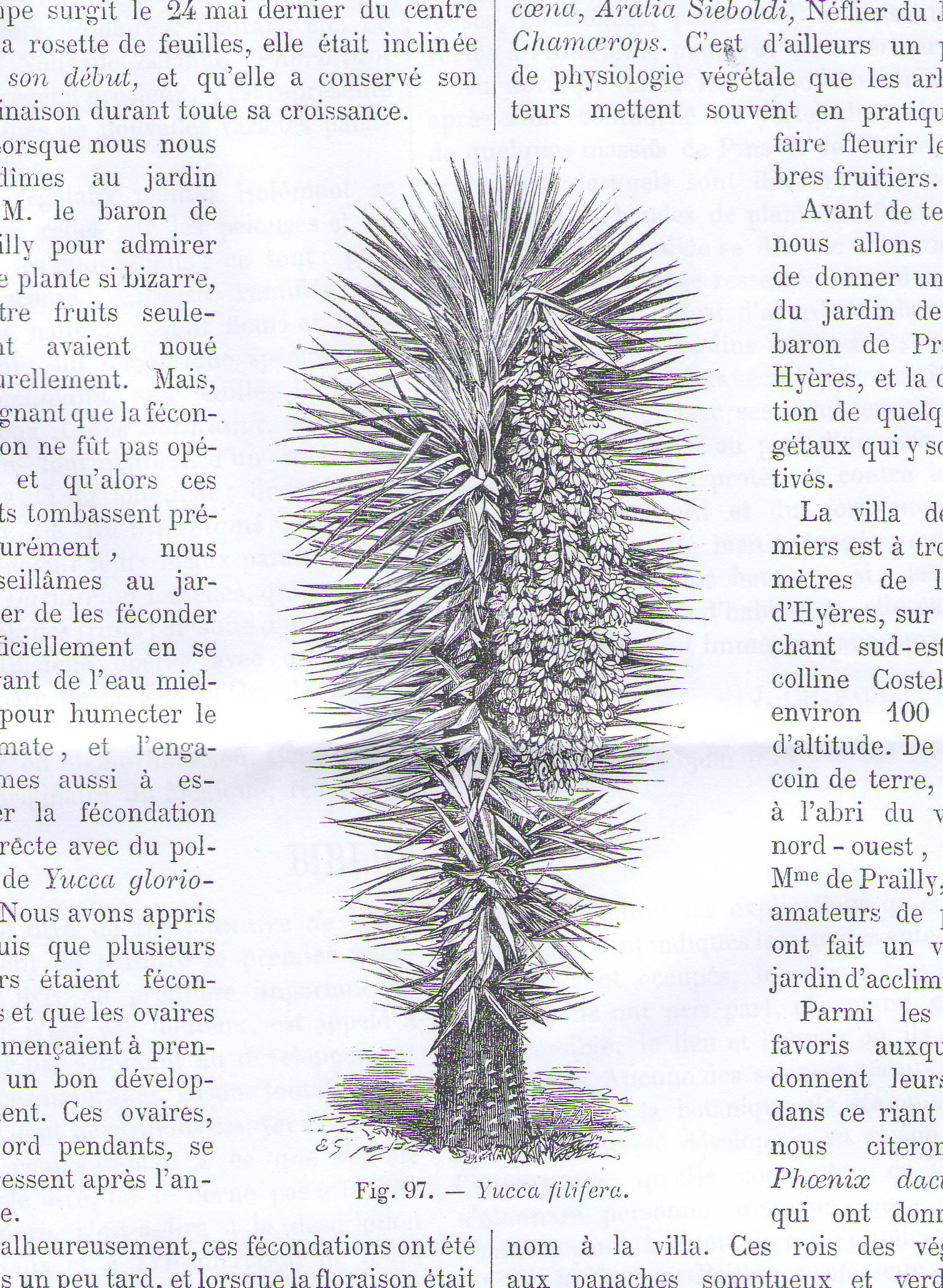
Yucca filifera as described by Chabaud, 1876

A tall, heavily branched yucca, Y. filifera has straight, ensiform leaves growing in rosette-shaped bunches from the end of each stem. Its inflorescence hangs over and is made of many separate white flowers.

== Status ==
Yucca filifera is not considered to be threatened by the IUCN, as it has a very large range and its population appears to be stable. It is locally used for fibers, and may experience some threat from habitat degradation.

== Cultivation ==
Y. filifera can be cultivated in xerophytic conditions. It is used as roof covering and as a source of fibre for handcrafting by the indigenous people, who call it palma china or izote.

An enormous specimen of Yucca filifera stands in front of the Anderson Collection at the Cantor Arts Center, Stanford University. It was transplanted to this site in the 1880s from the nearby Arizona Garden. In the spring, it bears long clusters of white flowers, some well over a meter long.

== See also ==
- Zdeněk Ježek; Libor Kunte (July 2007). Encyclopedia of Succulents. Bookmart Limited. ISBN 978-90-366-1705-5.
