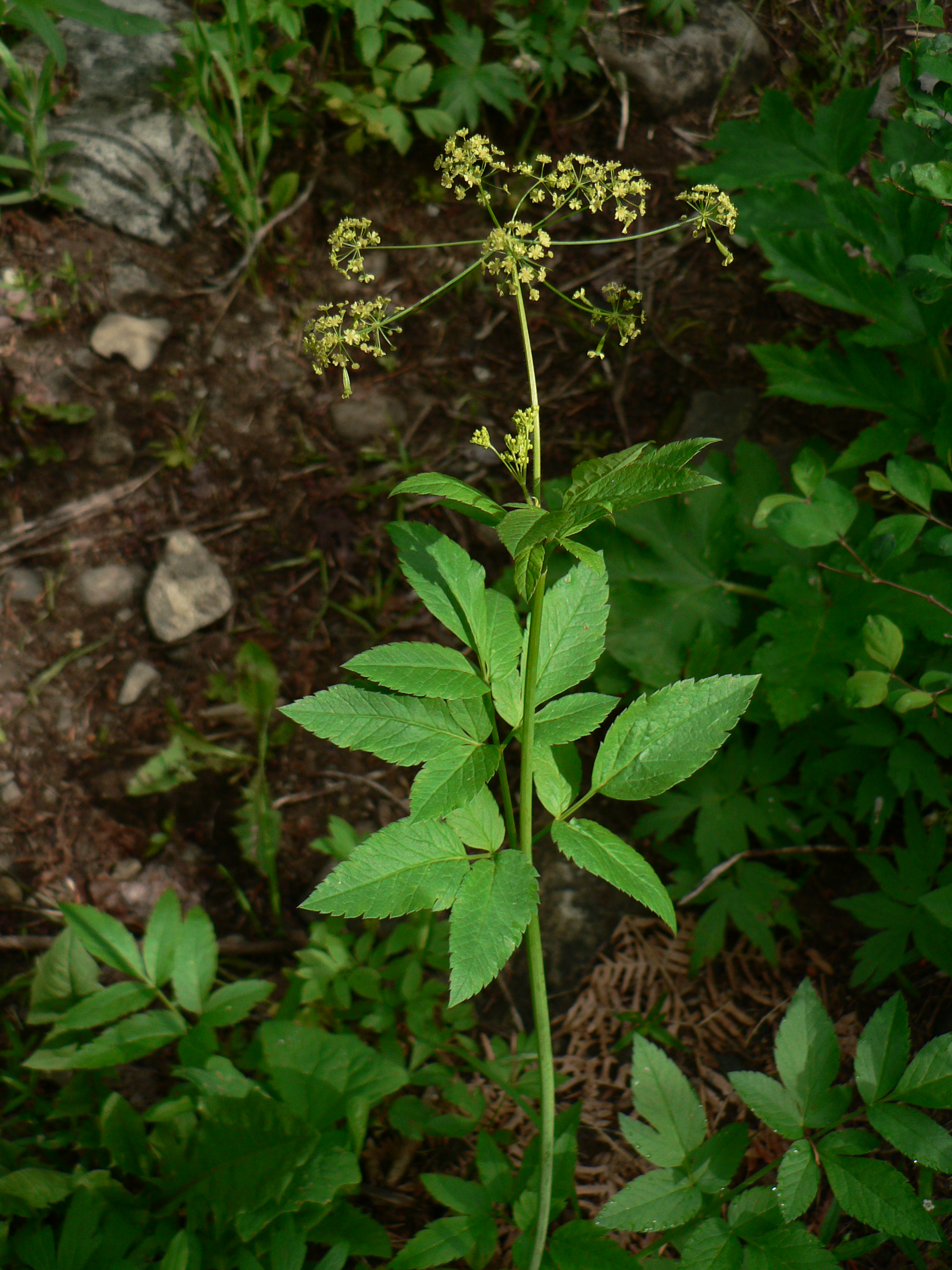

Conservation status
- Apparently Secure (NatureServe)

Scientific classification
- Kingdom: Plantae
- Clade: Tracheophytes
- Clade: Angiosperms
- Clade: Eudicots
- Clade: Asterids
- Order: Apiales
- Family: Apiaceae
- Genus: Osmorhiza
- Species: O. occidentalis

Binomial name
- Osmorhiza occidentalis (Nutt.) Torr.

= Osmorhiza occidentalis =

Species of flowering plant

Osmorhiza occidentalis is a species of flowering plant in the family Apiaceae known by the common name western sweet cicely or western sweetroot.

It is native to western North America, including the Northwestern United States and California. It grows in moist wooded and forested areas, most commonly in montane forests between 1,200–3,000 metres (3,900–9,800 ft).

== Description ==
Osmorhiza occidentalis is an erect perennial herb up sometimes exceeding 1 metre (3.3 ft) tall.

The green leaves have blades up to 20 centimeters long which are divided into toothed and irregularly cut leaflets. The blade is borne on a long petiole.

The inflorescence is a compound umbel of many tiny yellowish flowers at the tip of a stemlike peduncle. The fruit is elongated and narrow, up to 2.2 centimeters long.

== Uses ==
Many Native American groups used this plant for a great variety of medicinal purposes.
