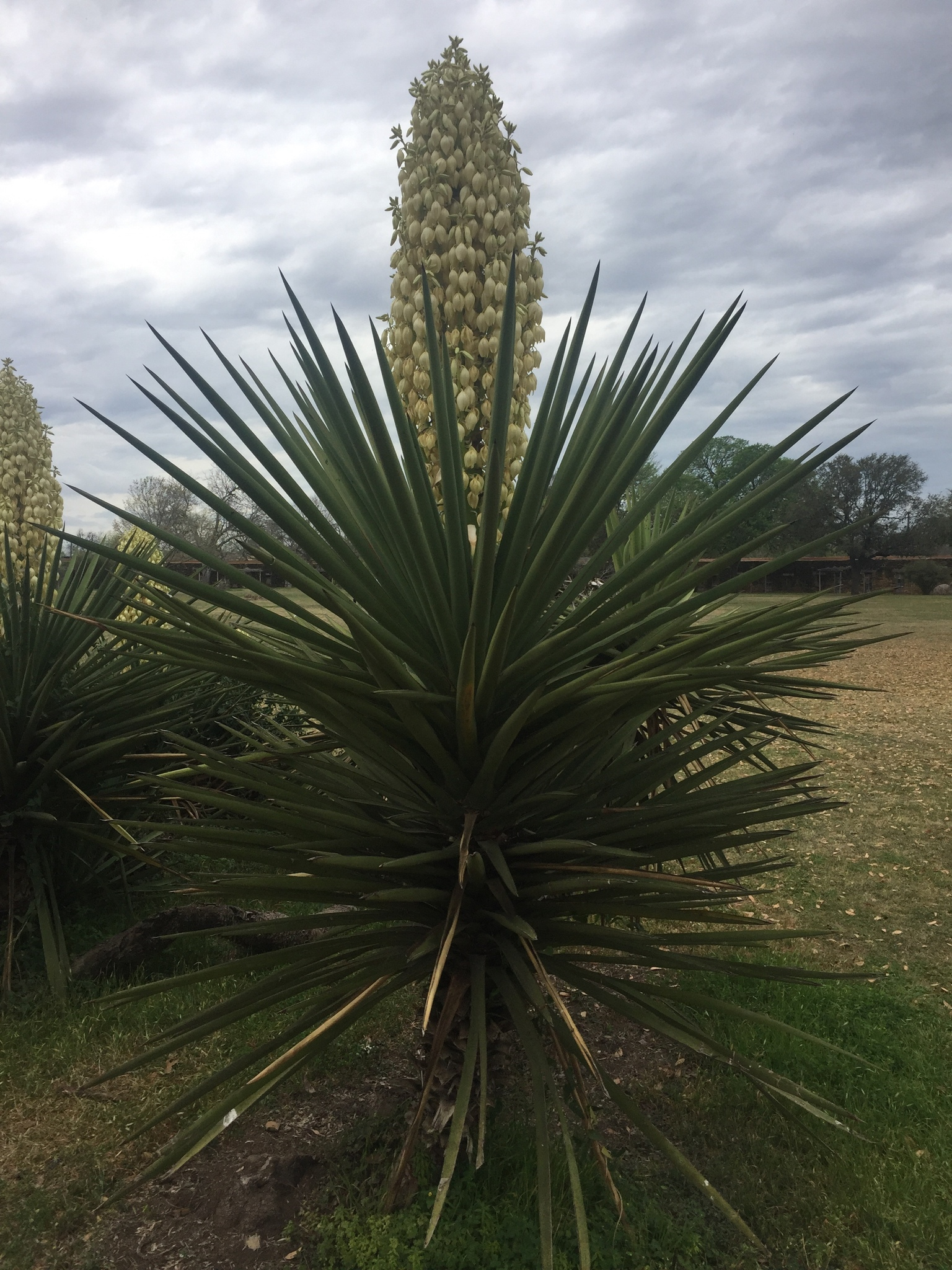

Conservation status
- Vulnerable (IUCN 3.1)

Scientific classification
- Kingdom: Plantae
- Clade: Embryophytes
- Clade: Tracheophytes
- Clade: Spermatophytes
- Clade: Angiosperms
- Clade: Monocots
- Order: Asparagales
- Family: Asparagaceae
- Subfamily: Agavoideae
- Genus: Yucca
- Species: Y. treculiana

Binomial name
- Yucca treculiana Carrière

Synonyms
- Sarcoyucca treculeana (Carrière) Linding.; Yucca agavoides Carrière; Yucca argospatha Verl.; Yucca aspera Regel; Yucca baccata var. australis Engelm.; Yucca canaliculata Hook.; Yucca canaliculata var. pendula K. Koch; Yucca contorta Carrière; Yucca cornuta Baker; Yucca crassifila Engelm.; Yucca longifolia Buckley, nom. illeg.; Yucca recurvata Carrière; Yucca revoluta Carrière; Yucca spinosa auct non Kunth; Yucca treculeana var. canaliculata Trel.; Yucca treculeana var. glauca Sprenger; Yucca treculeana var. succulenta McKelvey; Yucca undulata K.Koch

= Yucca treculiana =

Species of flowering plant

Yucca treculiana Carrière is a species of flowering plant in the family Asparagaceae, native to Texas, Coahuila, Nuevo Leon, and Tamaulipas. Common names include Trecul's Yucca, Spanish dagger, Spanish bayonet, and Don Quixote's lance.

== Description ==
Yucca treculiana is a large species of Yucca with stem unbranched except near the top, and up to 10 or more feet tall occurring in brushy and open areas. The leaves are stiff with a sharp pointed apex and are up to 3 feet long by 3 inches wide, in large clumps at the ends of stems or branches, with dead leaves hanging below the live leaves. The flowers are white or faintly purplish, in dense showy clusters rising above the leaves, typically flowering in March and April. The fruit is a capsule up to 4 inches long by 1 inch wide.

== Taxonomy ==
Ayala-Hernandez et al. analyzed genetic data in 2025 and found Yucca treculiana and the often-confused Yucca torreyi to not only be distinct species, but of different lineages. Y. torreyi was found to be more closely related to Y. filifera, Y. potosina, Y. decipiens, and Y. queretaroensis than it is to Y. treculiana.

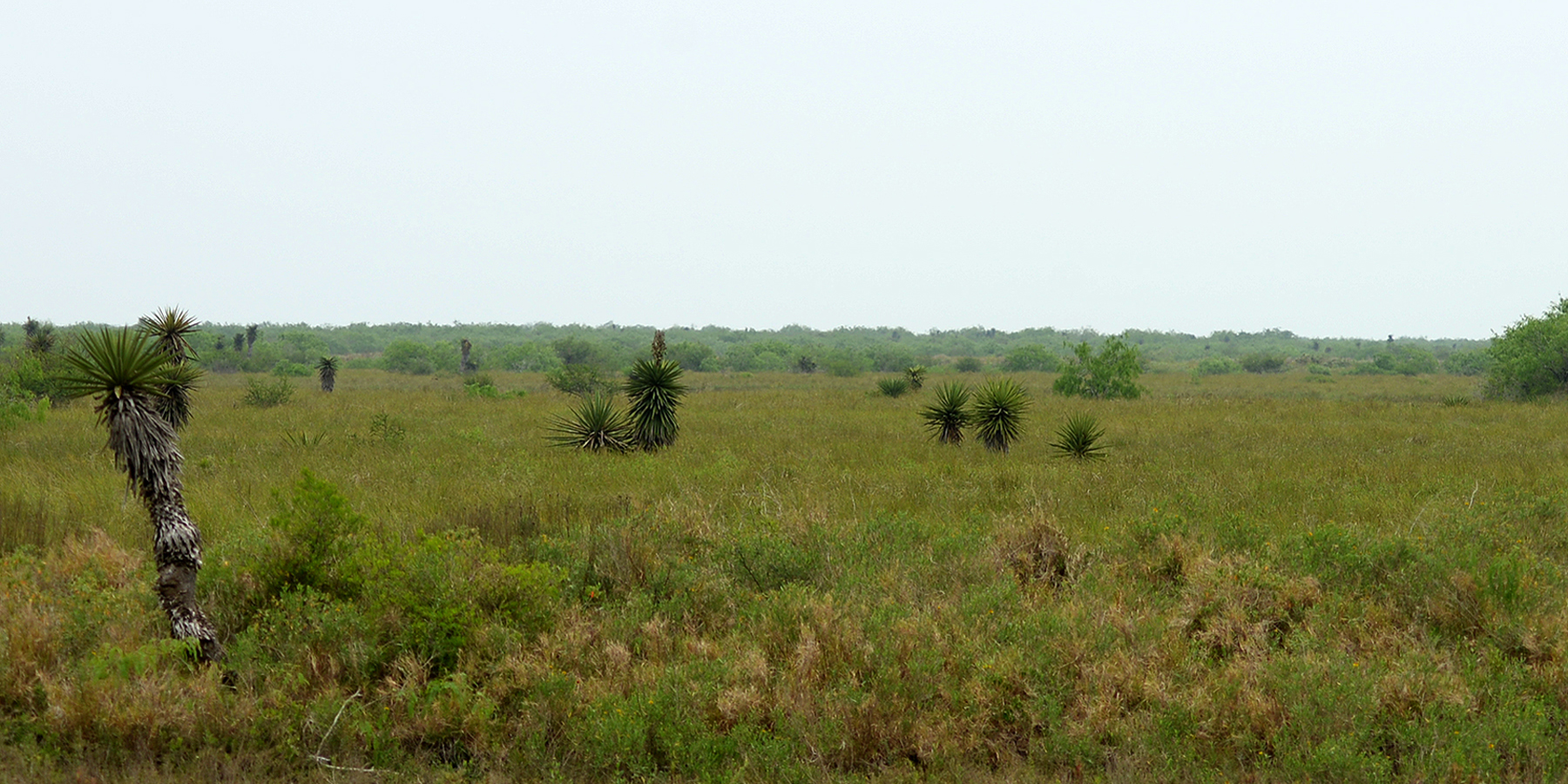
Spanish Dagger (Yucca treculiana), Laguna Atascosa National Wildlife Refuge, Cameron County, Texas, USA (12 April 2016)
