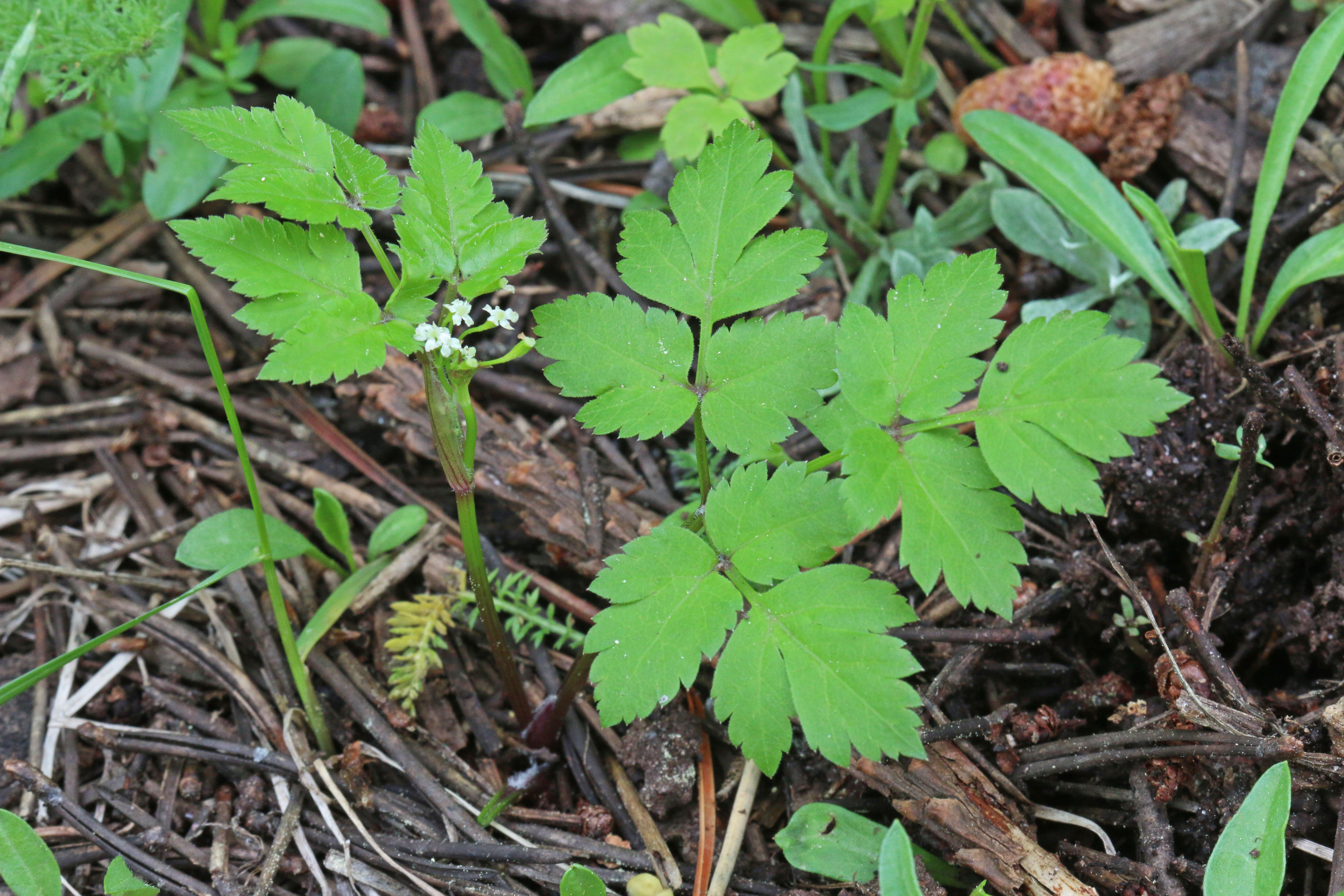

Conservation status
- Secure (NatureServe)

Scientific classification
- Kingdom: Plantae
- Clade: Tracheophytes
- Clade: Angiosperms
- Clade: Eudicots
- Clade: Asterids
- Order: Apiales
- Family: Apiaceae
- Genus: Osmorhiza
- Species: O. depauperata

Binomial name
- Osmorhiza depauperata Phil.

Synonyms
- Osmorhiza obtusa

= Osmorhiza depauperata =

Species of flowering plant

Osmorhiza depauperata is a species of flowering plant in the carrot family known by the common names bluntseed sweetroot and blunt-fruited sweet-cicely.

== Distribution and habitat ==
The plant is native to much of western and northern North America, as well as parts of South America. It grows in wooded areas.

== Description ==
Osmorhiza depauperata is an erect perennial herb up to 80 centimeters tall.

The green leaves have blades up to 12 centimeters wide which are divided into toothed or deeply lobed leaflets. The blade is borne on a long petiole.

The inflorescence is a compound umbel of many tiny white flowers at the tip of a stemlike peduncle. The club-shaped fruit is ribbed and bristly, measuring 1 to 2 centimeters long.
