= University of Iowa Museum of Natural History =

Coordinates: 41.6619°N 91.5357°W

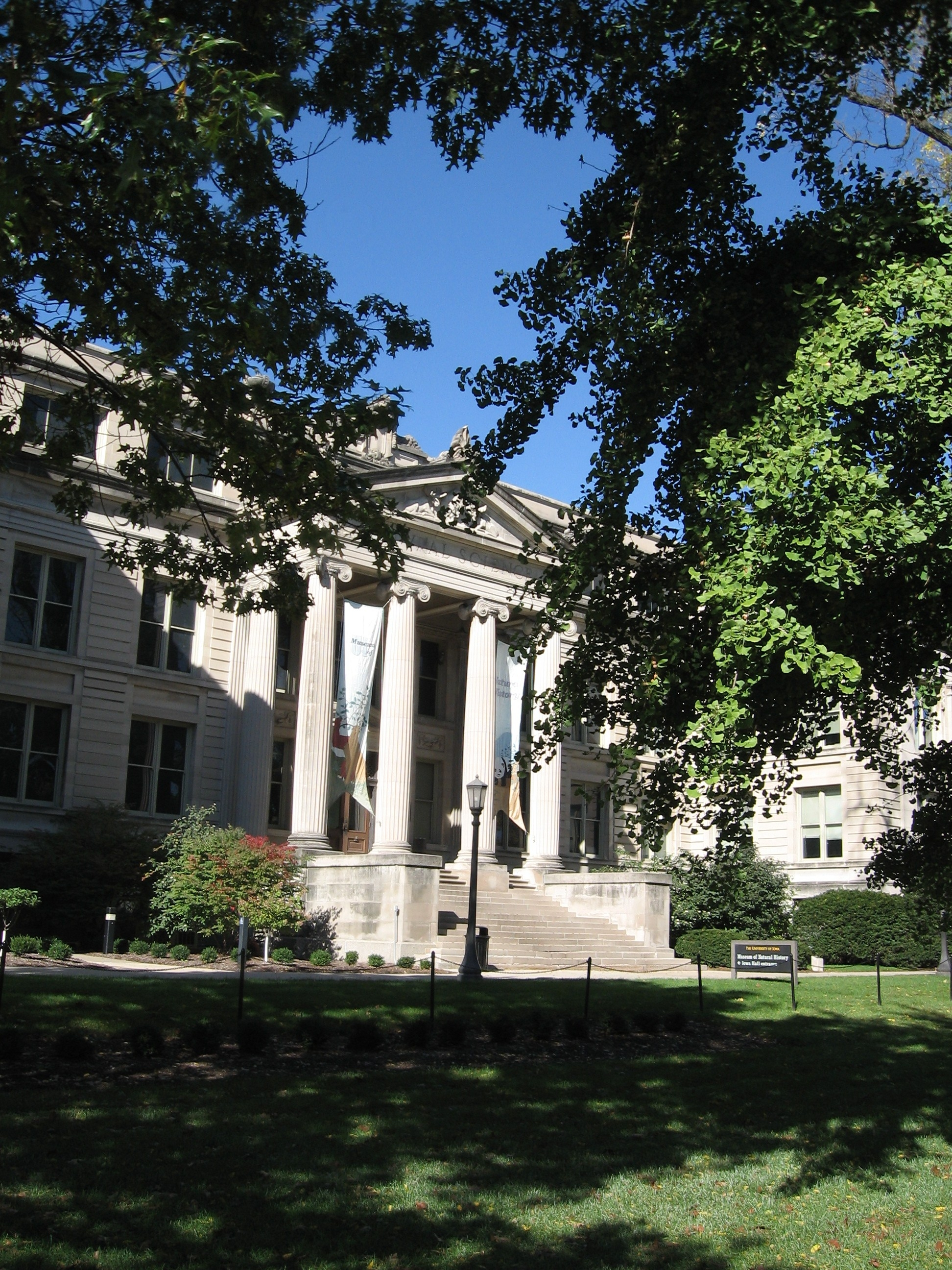
- Entrance to the University of Iowa Museum of Natural History
- Former name: University of Iowa Cabinet of Natural History
- Established: 1858
- Location: 17 N Clinton St. University of Iowa; Iowa City, Iowa, US
- Type: Natural history museum
- Accreditation: American Alliance of Museums
- Collections: Archaeological; Ethnographical; Zoological
- Collection size: 140,000 objects
- Director: Liz Crooks
- Website: https://mnh.uiowa.edu/

The University of Iowa Museum of Natural History is a natural history museum on the University of Iowa campus in Iowa City, Iowa. The museum was founded in 1858 by instruction of the Iowa General Assembly as the Cabinet of Natural History. It is housed within Macbride Hall, located in the Pentacrest area of the university campus. The museum's collections contain around 140,000 objects, including approximately 31,000 birds, eggs, and nests, 5,000 mammal specimens, 41,000 insects, 44,000 other invertebrates, 6,000 archaeological specimens, and historical documents and images from the museum's history. The museum includes several galleries on Iowa's geological and cultural history, biological diversity, and environmental science, spanning four floors. Major research collections include the Kallam Collection of prehistoric stone tools, the Talbot and Jones Bird Collections, the Frank Russell Collection of Inuit and Native Arctic artifacts, and the Philippine Collection of ethnographic materials from the 1904 World's Fair.

== History ==
The museum was originally founded by order of the Iowa General Assembly as a "cabinet" in which to house specimens from the State Natural History and Geological Surveys. This Cabinet of Natural History was housed in the Old Capitol, the university's only building at the time. Paleontologist James Hall was appointed as the cabinet's curator, though he abandoned this responsibility due to an earlier instance of bankruptcy at the university during his tenure as State Geologist.

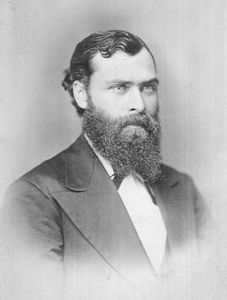
Geologist Samuel Calvin, the museum's fourth curator

Historian and lawyer Theodore S. Parvin was appointed as the Cabinet of Natural History's second curator in 1859. During this period, much of the cabinet's efforts were focused on building geological collections. After its fourth curator, geologist Samuel Calvin, successfully requested more funding for its fossil, bird, and mammal collections, the Cabinet of Natural History was moved to the Science Hall—now Calvin Hall—in 1885. Two years later, it was renamed the Museum of Natural History.

Under zoologist Charles Cleveland Nutting, who had been appointed curator in 1876, systematic glass displays of specimens were installed as popular attractions on the university's campus. Nutting also organized several significant expeditions to Dry Tortugas, The Bahamas, and Laysan Island, among other localities. By 1895, an influx of specimens prompted Nutting to request a larger building in which to house the museum. In response, a new Natural Sciences Building—now Macbride Hall—was completed in 1908 by the architectural firm Proudfoot & Bird.

After zoologist Homer R. Dill succeeded Nutting as curator in 1926, the Museum of Natural History's level of collecting fell. In 1965, in response to higher enrollment, a proposal was made by university president Howard R. Bowen to eliminate the museum. However, due to protests from student, faculty, and alumni, this proposal was unsuccessful. As part of an effort to revitalize support to the museum, university alumnus George D. Schrimper was appointed as curator in 1972. Schrimper emphasized the redesign of the museum's exhibits for a more modern audience; these plans included the creation of a new gallery, Iowa Hall, in 1985. By 1992, the Museum of Natural History received approximately 60,000 visitors per year.

== Permanent Exhibits ==
- Diversity of Life, featuring historic exhibits from the museum's past on ecology, geology, taxidermy, and biodiversity, with a highlight on notable animal phyla.
- Iowa Hall, featuring the history of life in Iowa on the first floor of the museum. Dioramas of a Devonian coral reef and a Pennsylvanian coal swamp are featured, along with a model of Jefferson's ground sloth (Megalonyx jeffersonii) and exhibits on Paleoindians and the Meskwaki tribe.
- Mammal Hall, showcasing taxidermied specimens and skeletons of various mammals collected by University faculty and students on the third floor of the museum. A skeleton of an Atlantic right whale is on display, along with a taxidermied specimen of a giant panda.
- William and Eleanor Hageboeck Hall of Birds, also called "Taking Flight: The World of Birds”, is located on the third floor of the museum. It features displays on the life, ecology, and evolution of birds and over 1,000 specimens, including those of nearly all avian species that live in or regularly visit Iowa. The historic Laysan Island Cyclorama is highlighted in this gallery, featuring a 360-degree view of the bird fauna of Laysan Island during the early twentieth century.
- Biosphere Discovery Hub, the museum's newest exhibit (opened in 2007), is located inside the Hageboeck Hall of Birds. The exhibit describes interactions between humans and their environment, highlighting manmade environmental concerns.
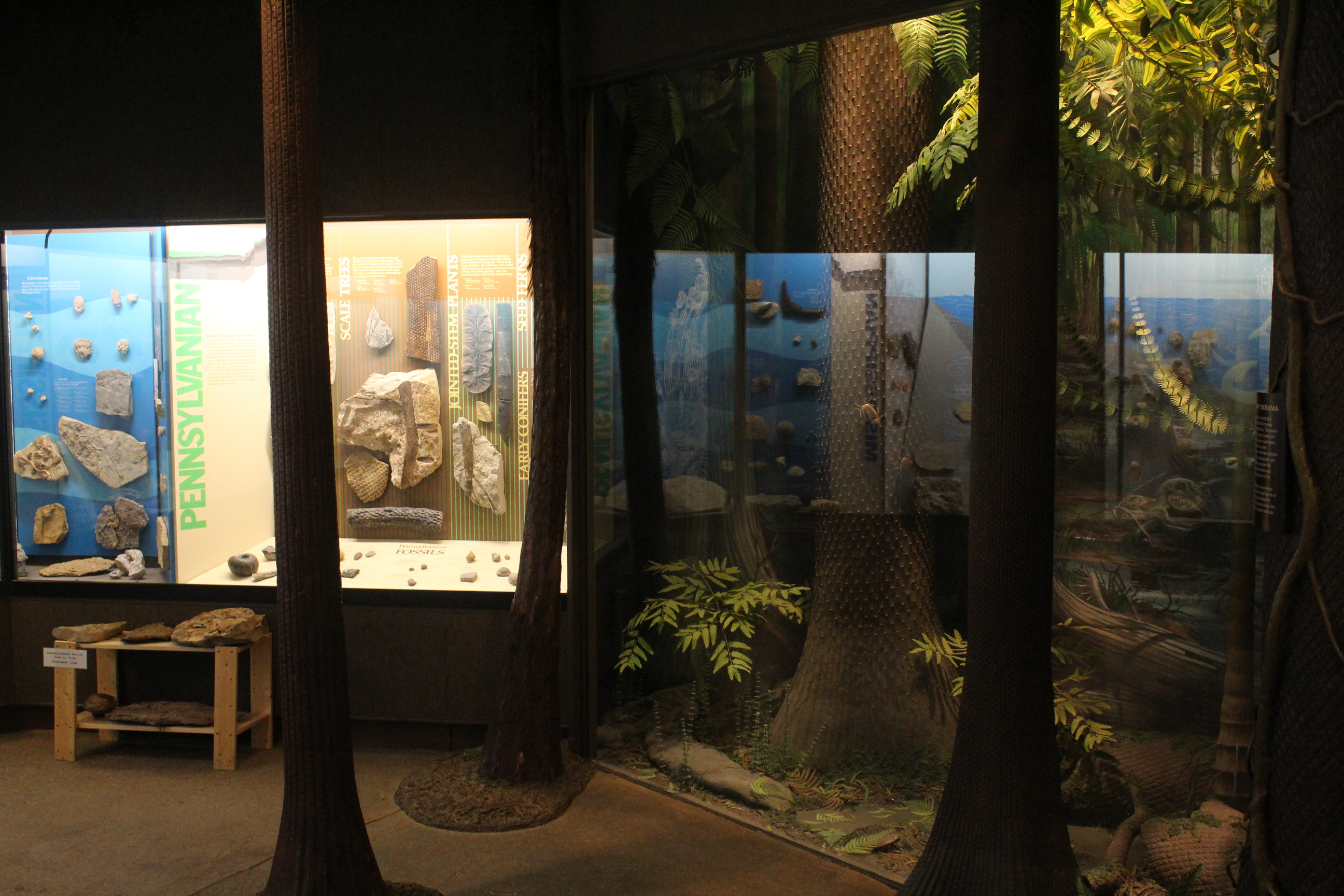
  Diorama of a Pennsylvanian coal swamp in Iowa Hall
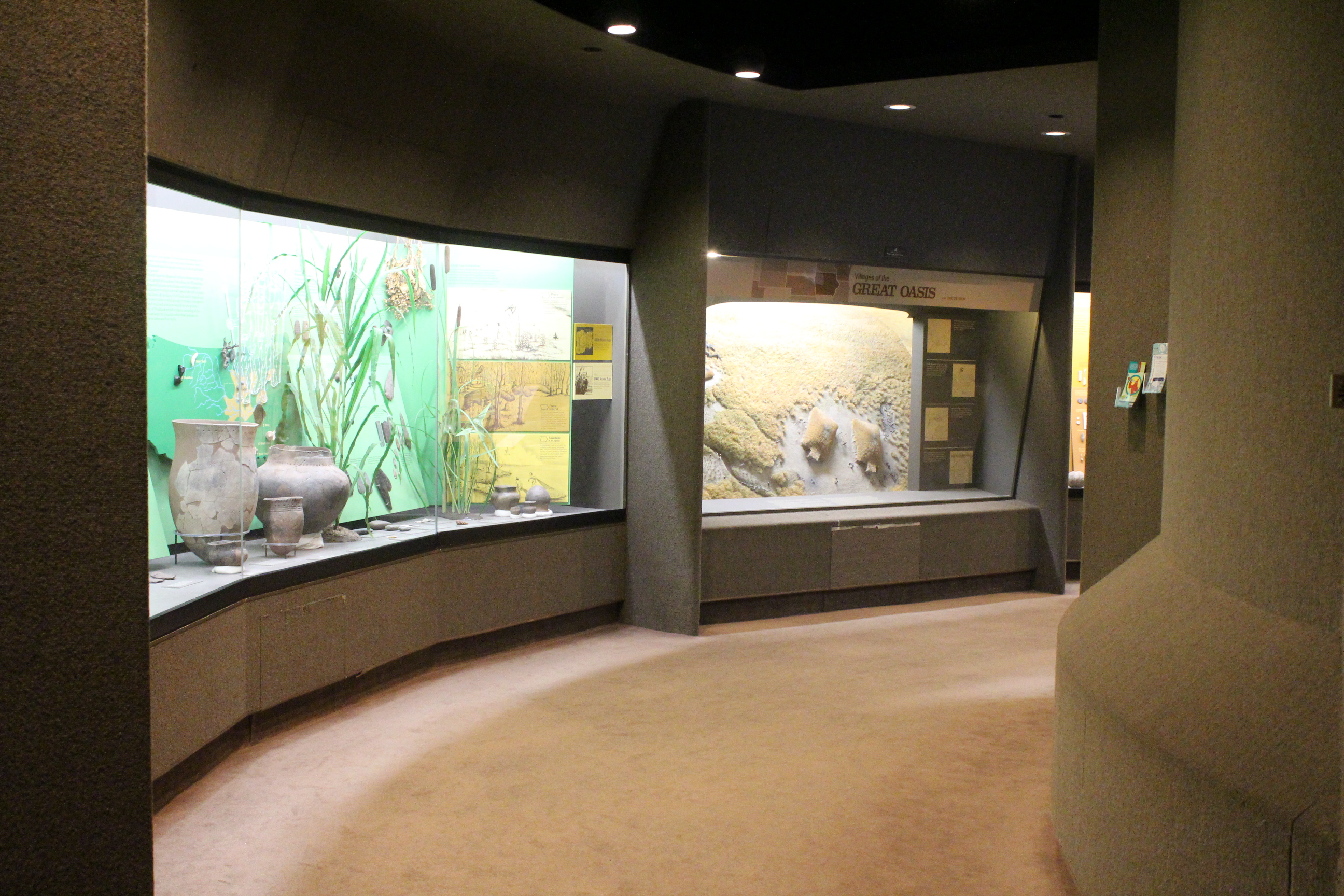
  Displays on Paleoindian artifacts in Iowa Hall
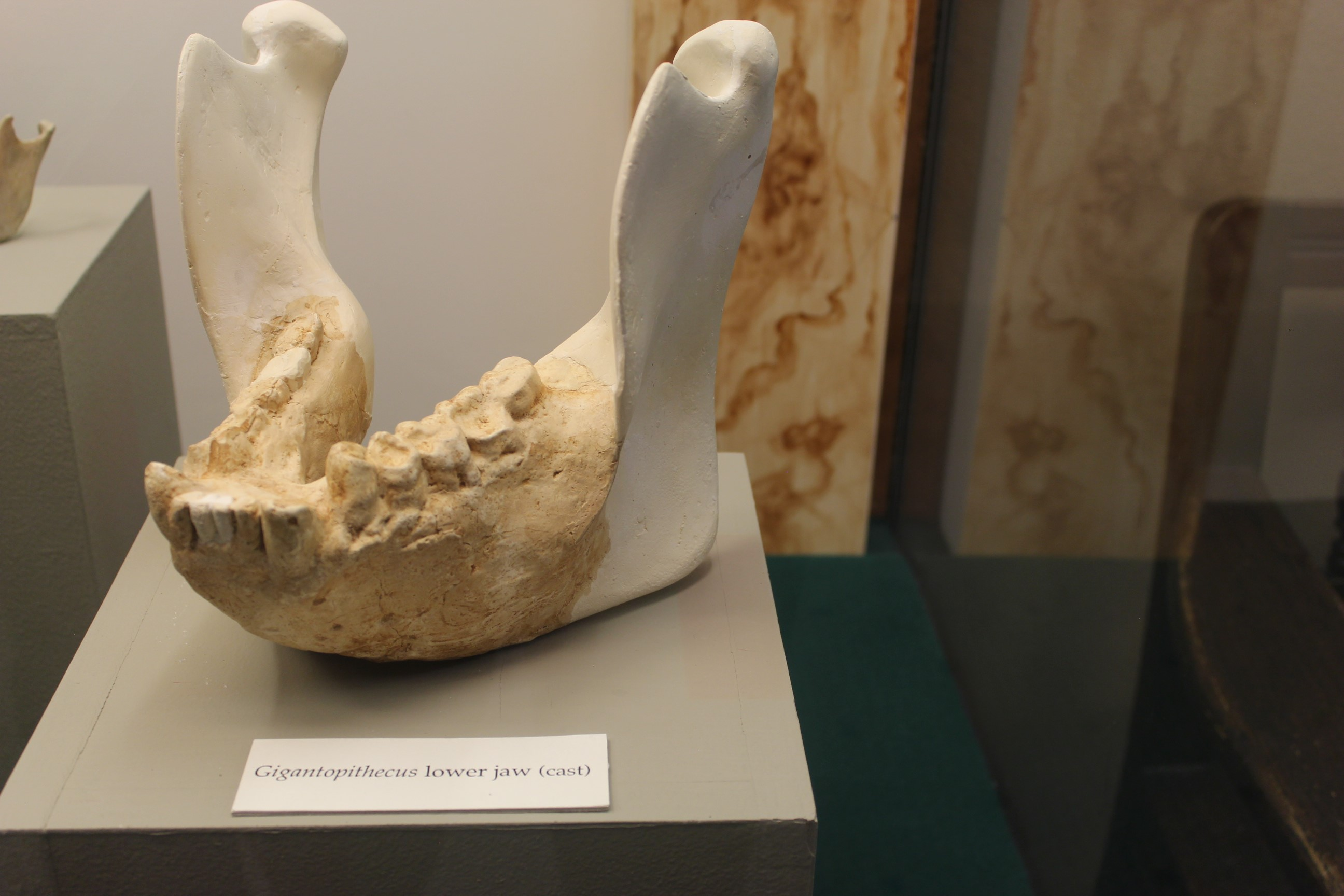
  Replica of a Gigantopithecus blacki jaw on display in Diversity of Life
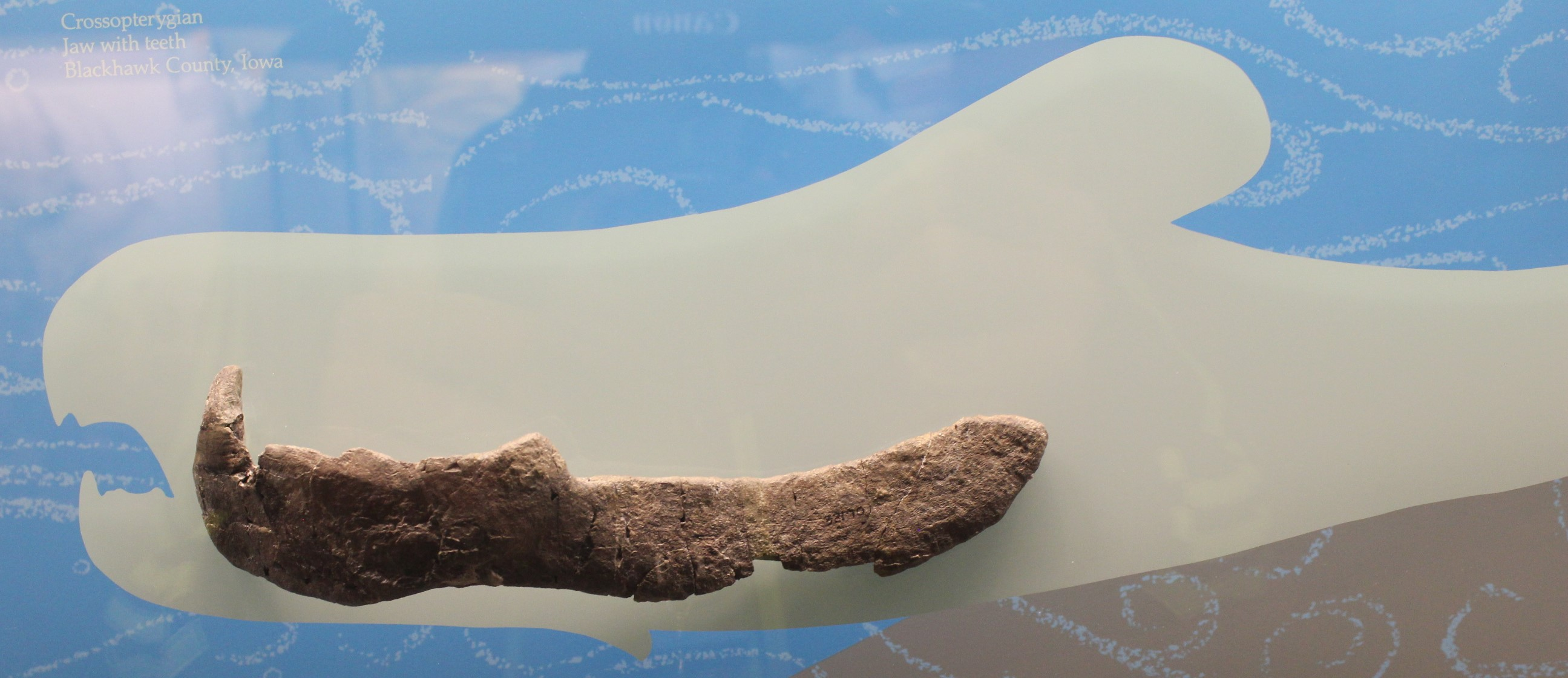
  Fossil jaw of Dunkleosteus on display in Iowa Hall

== Tarkio Valley sloths ==
From 2002 until 2010, the museum coordinated excavations of at least three Megalonyx jeffersonii individuals along the West Tarkio Creek near Shenandoah, Iowa. Most recently, a fourth ground sloth of a different species, Paramylodon harlani, has been identified from the excavation site. This is the first confirmed specimen of the genus to be discovered in Iowa.
