= Douglas Steinbrech =

American plastic surgeon (born 1965)

Douglas S. Steinbrech
- Born: 1965 (age 60–61); Solon, Iowa
- Education: Doctor of Medicine, University of Iowa
- Alma mater: University of Iowa (M.D.)
- Occupations: Plastic and reconstructive surgery
- Years active: 21
- Known for: Plastic surgery, Mommy Makeover Manhattan
- Website: www.drsteinbrech.com

Douglas S. Steinbrech (born 1965) is a plastic and reconstructive surgeon affiliated with Lenox Hill Hospital, the NYU Langone Medical Center in New York City and the New York Eye and Ear Infirmary of Mount Sinai and NYU Langone Medical Center. He left Gotham Plastic Surgery in 2022 to open the first male aesthetic plastic surgery practice in the US.

== Education and training ==
Steinbrech received a Bachelor of Science degree in biology from the University of Iowa College of Liberal Arts and Sciences in 1988. Then, he attended medical school at the University of Iowa Carver College of Medicine where he graduated in 1994.

== Career ==
Steinbrech is a Fellow of the American College of Surgeons since 2008. He is currently a clinical instructor at the New York University School of Medicine, practices at Gotham Plastic Surgery, and is a member of several medical societies including the American Society for Aesthetic Plastic Surgery, the American Society of Plastic Surgeons and the American Medical Association.

== Selected publications ==
- Steinbrech, Douglas (May 2009). Aesthetic Plastic Surgery (1st ed.). Elsevier. p. 976. ISBN 978-0-7020-3168-7.
- Gilbert SR, Steinbrech DS, Landas SK, and Hunninghake GW. Amounts of Angiotensin Converting enzyme mRNA reflect the burden of granulomas in granulomatous lung disease. American Review of Respiratory Disease, 148: 483-6 1993.
- Steinbrech DS et al. Fibroblast response to hypoxia: The relationship between angiogenesis and matrix regulation. Journal of Surgical Research, 84(2):127-33, 1999
