= Utterback =

Utterback is a surname. Notable people with the surname include:

- Bill Utterback (1931–2010), illustrator and caricature artist
- Camille Utterback (born 1970), interactive installation artist
- Gary L. Utterback (1889–1962), American politician from Maryland
- Hubert Utterback (1880–1942), served on the Iowa Supreme Court, elected to the United States House of Representatives
- John G. Utterback (1872–1955), U.S. Representative from Maine, and cousin of Hubert Utterback
- Luther Utterback (1947–1997), American artist, who primarily worked in sculpture and painting
- Robin Utterback (1949–2007), contemporary artist from Houston, Texas
- Sarah Utterback (born 1982), American actress, played Nurse Olivia Harper on ABC's medical drama series Grey's Anatomy
- William Irvin Utterback (1872–1949), malacologist
- Loyd Stafford "Chip" Utterback (born 1953), Lieutenant General in the United States Air Force

== See also ==
- Utterbackia
