= University of Iowa College of Liberal Arts and Sciences =

- Type: Public
- Established: 1900
- Faculty: 600
- Students: 18,300
- Undergraduates: 16,000
- Postgraduates: 2,300
- Location: Iowa City, Iowa, USA
- Campus: Urban
- Dean: Sara Sanders
- Website: http://www.clas.uiowa.edu/

The University of Iowa College of Liberal Arts and Sciences (CLAS) is the largest of the eleven colleges at the University of Iowa, founded in 1900. In 2007-2008, there was a total of 16,417 undergraduates enrolled in CLAS, 81% of all undergraduates at the university, and about 2,400 graduate students. The largest undergraduate majors are: Psychology, English, Biology, Communication Studies, Interdepartmental Studies, Political Science, School of Art and Art History, History, International Studies, and Journalism. The College is housed in Schaeffer Hall, part of the historic Pentacrest on the university's Iowa City campus.

== History ==
The College of Liberal Arts and Sciences was founded in 1900 when the University reorganized itself through the establishment of colleges to nurture disciplinary areas. Though The University of Iowa has offered liberal arts education since its founding in 1847, The College of Liberal Arts came into existence only at the dawn of the new century. George MacLean, president of the University of Iowa from 1899–1911 and whom a building on the Pentacrest is named for, reorganized the academic structure of the University, transforming the Collegiate Department into the College of Liberal Arts, one of the seven colleges established in 1900-01, along with the Graduate College and five professional colleges. Eventually, other colleges evolved from Liberal Arts: Engineering in 1905, Education in 1913, and Commerce, now Business in 1921.

The College of Liberal Arts was renamed The College of Liberal Arts and Sciences in 2001. There are currently 140,000 living alumni of the College.

== Departments and Academic Programs ==
CLAS is made up of roughly 40 academic departments, ranging from the fine and performing arts, humanities and letters, social sciences, and natural sciences and mathematical sciences. These units offer nearly 70 undergraduate majors and certificates, as well as more than 50 graduate programs, for which the degrees are awarded by the Graduate College.
