= Women's Resource & Action Center =

The Women's Resource and Action Center, also known as WRAC, is an organization dedicated to the equality and well-being of female students at the University of Iowa and members of the Iowa City community. It provides resources and information that are helpful for the everyday activities of women and as a source of entertainment and subject matter relevant to women.

== History ==
Originally called the Women's Liberation Front in 1971, WRAC was established to promote women's rights and equality, and allow women to meet other women as friends, classmates, coworkers, etc. WRAC's website states that members of the organization "met to discuss their shared oppression as women and search for solutions to their common problems." In 1974, the group changed its name to that which it currently holds: Women's Resource and Action Center.

When the organization was created, the members made it an issue to function collectively rather than have an officer team or executive board, to encourage women's empowerment and not be discriminatory. After WRAC had successfully established itself as a feminist group in the Iowa City community, it began to reach out to other oppressed groups, diversifying their human rights values to expand to groups including "people of color, people with disabilities, the elderly, and lesbians and gays." Originally, as a source of education and entertainment, WRAC held workshops and programs such as counseling, divorce rights, abortion and birth control, women's health information, women's studies, self-defense, economics, etc. These workshops and programs were beneficial to all women involved with WRAC because of the knowledge they were obtaining.

In the early 1980s, the Women Against Racism Committee (WAR) was formed as a branch of WRAC, and populated primarily by the members of WRAC, as well as other women in the Iowa City community. The original purpose of the organization was to critique the racism WRAC members perceived, and to raise awareness of the harmful effects of internalized racism. These actions evolved into the study of all forms of oppression, including sexism, disability-related discrimination, and homophobia, especially among colored women. As WAR grew in popularity, it brought in renowned speakers, such as Winona LaDuke and Natalie Wong to the University of Iowa campus to speak on behalf of the oppressed populations. In early April, 1989, WAR held its first and only national conference, "Parallels and Intersections: Racism and Other Forms of Oppression." Participation in the Women Against Racism Committee declined throughout the 1990s until it was shut down in 1998.

== Present day ==
=== Programs ===
WRAC offers services including counseling, scholarships, support groups, and a library containing resources that address financing, health care (women's health, abuse recovery, eating disorders), gender studies, LGBT studies, marriage, sex, parenting, feminism theory, domestic violence, single parenting, adoption, and literature. The Center has also helped teach bystander intervention classes that were open to all members of the community to combat the issue of street harassment in Iowa City in 2014.

=== Student life ===
WRAC has organized "Take Back The Night" rallies, an event including a march in advocation of sexual violence victims and an open-mic time for victims to tell their stories that has been ongoing since 1979. Since 2014 the University of Iowa has had a new focus on decreasing sexual assaults on campus. Because of this, WRAC has increased their staff and resources and has been able to reach more students. The organization grew too large for its former location on Madison Street where the Center was for 39 years. Between the growth of WRAC and the old age of the building, the organization has since moved into the Bowman House on Clinton Street, officially occupying the space on January 7, 2016.

== Safety ==
WRAC has been providing safety resources for years. Whether it be in their office or online, there are many different options. For example, on their website, it lists hotlines for immediate assistance as well as counselling and care for victims of sexual assault. One of WRAC's projects to fight sexual violence and increase safety was the Street Lighting and Safety Project. WRAC acted as an advisor to the Association of Student Women (ASW) and collaborated with them to complete the project. The goal of the Street Lighting and Safety Project was to have more street lights put in place around Iowa City to provide more lighting during the evenings and at night. WRAC and ASW began the project in 1976 and it was completed in 1980. The lights put up around the campus acted as a precursor to current lights and blue safety lights around campus today.
