= University of Iowa College of Engineering =

Academic college

Coordinates: 41.659671°N 91.536732°W

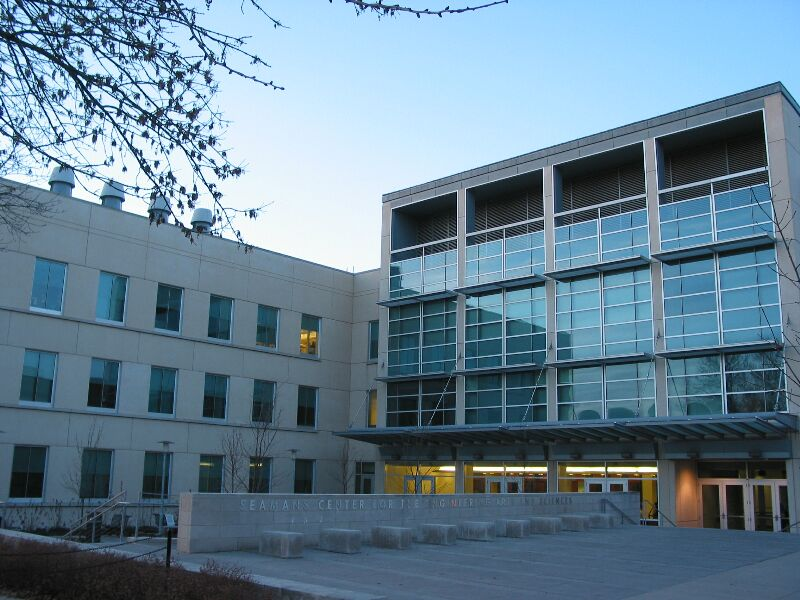
- Seamans Center for the Engineering Arts and Sciences
- Type: Public
- Established: 1904
- Dean: Ann F. McKenna
- Academic staff: 110
- Administrative staff: 173
- Students: 2445
- Undergraduates: 2176
- Postgraduates: 269
- Location: Iowa City, Iowa
- Website: www.engineering.uiowa.edu

The University of Iowa College of Engineering is one of twelve academic colleges in The University of Iowa.

The college comprises six distinct departments: biomedical, chemical and biochemical, civil and environmental, electrical and computer, industrial and systems, and mechanical engineering. It provides comprehensive educational programs leading to the attainment of bachelor's, master's, and doctoral degrees.

Eight alumni are members of the National Academy of Engineering.
