= University of Iowa =

Public university in Iowa City, Iowa, US

- Other name: State University of Iowa
- Type: Public research university
- Established: February 25, 1847; 179 years ago
- Parent institution: Iowa Board of Regents
- Accreditation: HLC
- Academic affiliations: AAU; URA; Space-grant
- Endowment: $3.77 billion (2025)
- President: Barbara J. Wilson
- Provost: Kevin Kregel
- Administrative staff: 2,296
- Students: 31,563 (fall 2025)
- Undergraduates: 23,407 (fall 2025)
- Postgraduates: 6,269 (fall 2025)
- Other students: 1,877 (fall 2025)
- Location: Iowa City, Iowa, United States; 41°39′42″N 91°32′11″W
- Campus: 1,880 acres (7.6 km^{2}); Small city
- Other campuses: Cedar Rapids; Des Moines; Oakdale
- Newspaper: The Daily Iowan
- Colors: Black and old gold (official); Black and gold (branding)
- Nickname: Hawkeyes
- Sporting affiliations: NCAA Division I FBS – Big Ten
- Mascot: Herky the Hawk
- Website: uiowa.edu

The University of Iowa (U of I, UIowa, or Iowa) is a public research university in Iowa City, Iowa, United States. Founded in 1847, it is the oldest and largest university in the state. The University of Iowa is organized into 12 colleges offering more than 200 areas of study and 7 professional degrees.

On an urban 1,880-acre campus on the banks of the Iowa River, the University of Iowa is classified among "R1: Doctoral Universities – Very high research activity". In fiscal year 2021, research expenditures at Iowa totaled $818 million. The university was the original developer of the Master of Fine Arts degree, and it operates the Iowa Writers' Workshop, whose alumni include 17 of the university's 46 Pulitzer Prize winners. Iowa is a member of the Association of American Universities and the Universities Research Association.

Among public universities in the United States, UI was the first to become coeducational and host a department of religious studies; it also opened the first coeducational medical school. The University of Iowa's 32,000 students take part in nearly 500 student organizations. Iowa's 22 varsity athletic teams, the Iowa Hawkeyes, compete in Division I of the NCAA and are members of the Big Ten Conference. The University of Iowa alumni network exceeds 250,000 graduates.

== History ==
=== Founding and early history ===
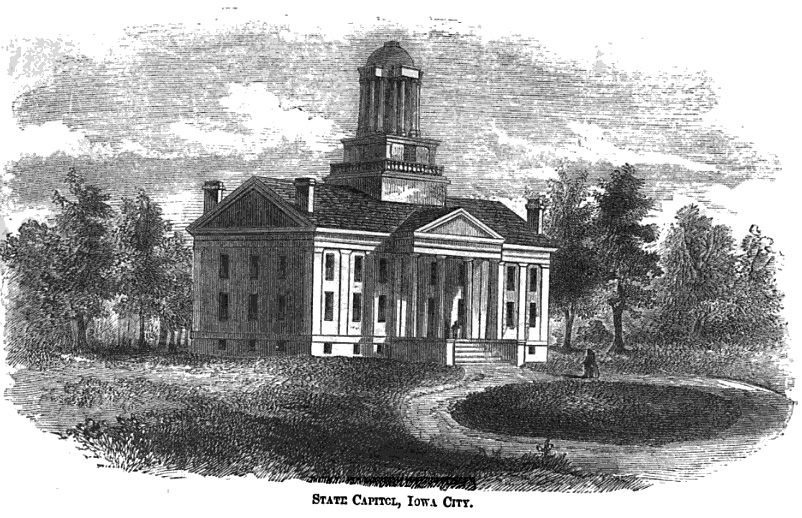
Iowa Old Capitol Building, Iowa City, 1855

The University of Iowa was founded on February 25, 1847, just 59 days after Iowa was admitted to the Union. The Constitution of the State of Iowa refers to a State University to be established in Iowa City "without branches at any other place." The legal name of the university is the State University of Iowa (frequently abbreviated as SUI), but the Board of Regents approved using "The University of Iowa" for everyday usage in October 1964.

The first faculty offered instruction at the university beginning in March 1855 to students in the Old Mechanics Building, located where the student recreational area east of Van Allen Hall is now. In September 1855, there were 124 students, of whom forty-one were women. The 1856–57 catalog listed nine departments offering ancient languages, modern languages, intellectual philosophy, moral philosophy, history, natural history, mathematics, natural philosophy, and chemistry. The first president of the university was Amos Dean.

The original campus consisted of the Iowa Old Capitol Building and the 10 acres (40,000 m^{2}) (4.05 hectares) of land on which it stood. Following the placing of the cornerstone July 4, 1840, the building housed the Fifth Legislative Assembly of the Territory of Iowa (December 5, 1842) and then became the first capitol building of the State of Iowa on December 28, 1846. Until that date, it had been the third capitol of the Territory of Iowa. When the capital of Iowa was moved to Des Moines in 1857, the Old Capitol became the first permanent "home" of the university.

In 1855, the university became the first public university in the United States to admit men and women on an equal basis. In addition, Iowa was the world's first university to accept creative work in theater, writing, music, and art on an equal basis with academic research.

The university was one of the first institutions in America to grant a law degree to a woman (Mary B. Hickey Wilkinson, 1873), to grant a law degree to an African American (Alexander G. Clark, Jr. in 1879), and to put an African American on a varsity athletic squad (Frank Holbrook in 1895). The university awarded its first doctorate in 1898.

=== 20th century–present ===
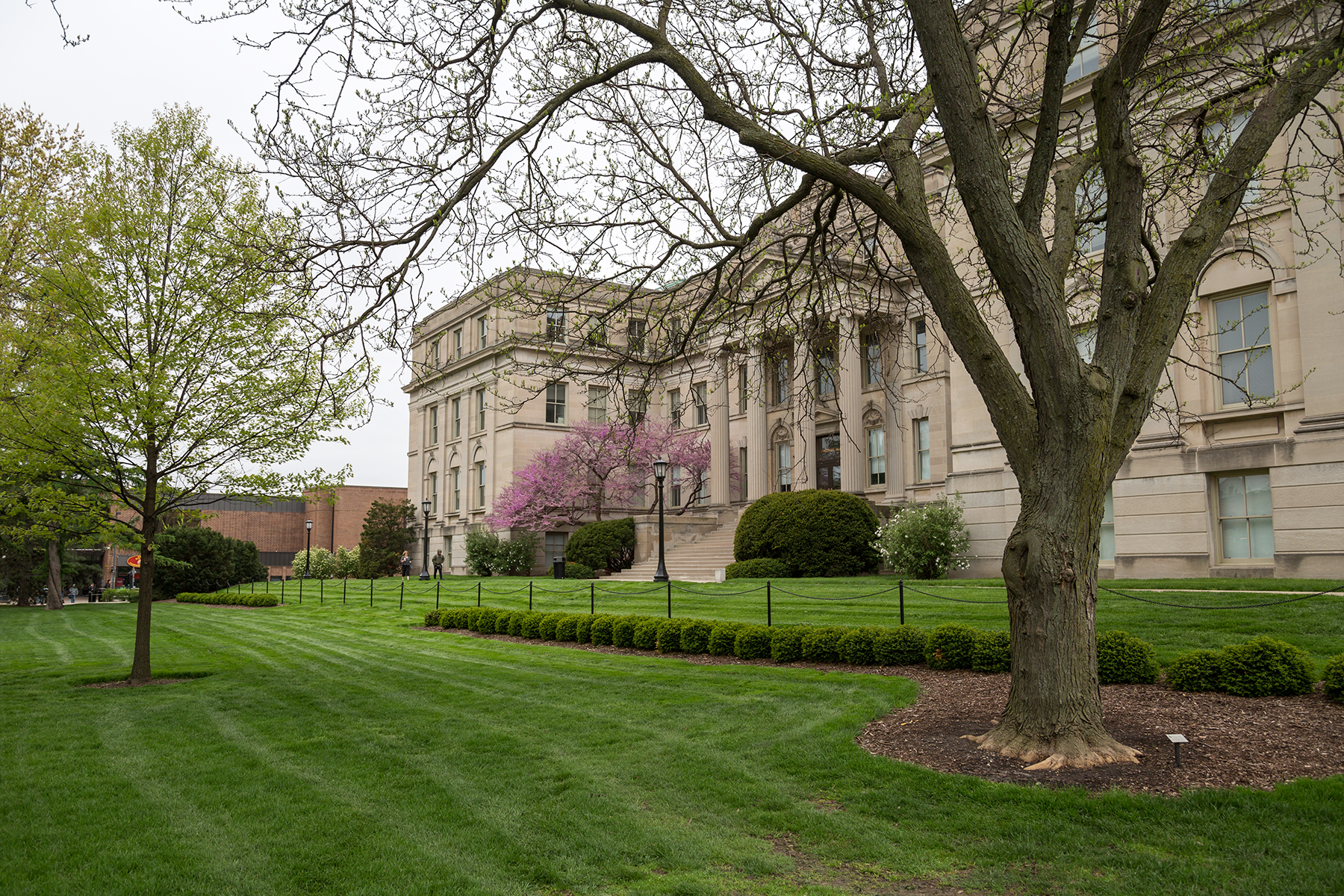
Schaeffer Hall, location of the College of Liberal Arts and Sciences

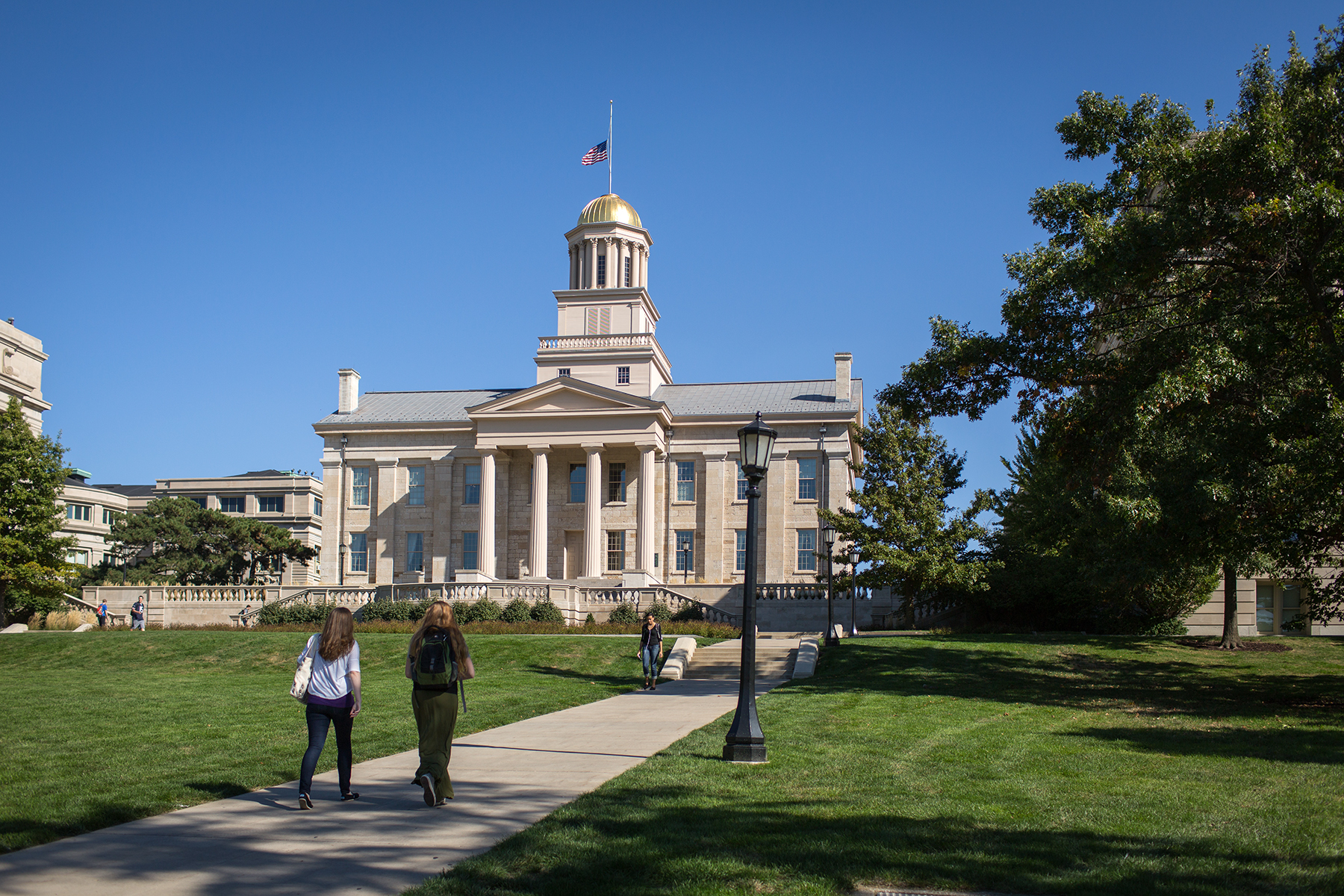
Old Capitol Museum

The University of Iowa established the first law school and dental school west of the Mississippi River. It was the first university to use radio (later television, too) in education, in 1932, and it pioneered in the field of standardized testing. Also, the University of Iowa was the first Big Ten institution to promote an African American to the position of administrative vice president (Phillip Hubbard, promoted in 1966).

Under the leadership of Carl Seashore in 1922, Iowa became the first university in the United States to accept creative projects as theses for advanced degrees. Traditionally, graduate study culminates in the writing of a scholarly thesis, but Iowa accepted creative works including a collection of poems, a musical composition, or a series of paintings to be presented to the graduate college in support of a degree. In so doing, Iowa established a creative standard in qualifying for the Master of Fine Arts degree and secured a place for writers and artists in the academy. The university's Program in Creative Writing, known worldwide as the Iowa Writers' Workshop, was founded in 1936 with the gathering together of writers of both poetry and fiction. It was the first creative writing program in the country, and it became the prototype for more than 300 writing programs, many of which were founded by Workshop alumni. The workshop remains the most prestigious creative writing program in the country and one of the most selective graduate programs of any kind, typically admitting fewer than five percent of its applicants.

The U.S. Atomic Energy Commission conducted several experiments examining the effects of iodine-131 administration in pregnant women (scheduled for abortions) and infants in 1953 and 1963, respectively.

The university was the first state university to recognize the Gay, Lesbian, Bisexual, Transgender, and Allied Union (in 1970).

A shooting took place on campus on November 1, 1991. Six people died in the shooting, including the perpetrator, and one other person was wounded. This was one of the deadliest university campus shootings in United States history.

In the summer of 2008, flood waters breached the Coralville Reservoir spillway, damaging more than 20 major campus buildings. Several weeks after the floodwaters receded, university officials placed a preliminary estimate on flood damage at $231.75 million. Later, the university estimated that repairs would cost about $743 million. The reconstruction and renovation work took a decade, but the university has recovered and taken several preventive measures with the hope of avoiding a tragic repeat of the event.

In January 2009, UNESCO designated Iowa City the world's third City of Literature, making it part of the UNESCO Creative Cities Network.

In 2015, the Iowa Board of Regents selected Bruce Harreld, a business consultant with limited experience in academic administration, to succeed Sally Mason as president. The regents' choice of Harreld provoked criticism and controversy on the UI campus due to his corporate background, lack of history in leading an institution of higher education, and the circumstances related to the search process. The regents said they had based their decision on the belief that Harreld could limit costs and find new sources of revenue beyond tuition in an age of declining state support for universities.

On July 15, 2021, Barbara J. Wilson was named the 22nd president of the University of Iowa.

On April 19, 2026, a mass shooting occurred near the campus. Five people were injured and one is in critical condition.

== Campus ==
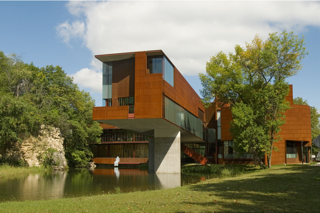
Art Building West, University of Iowa School of Art and Art History

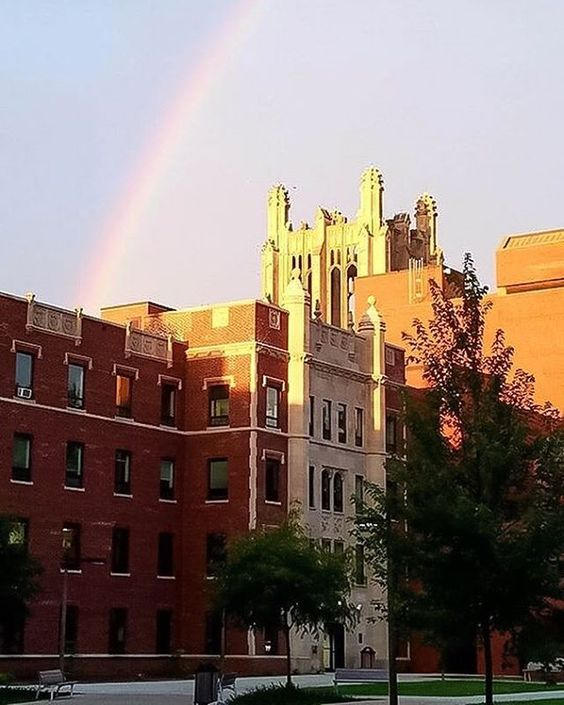
General Hospital's collegiate Gothic tower is prominent on the west side of campus

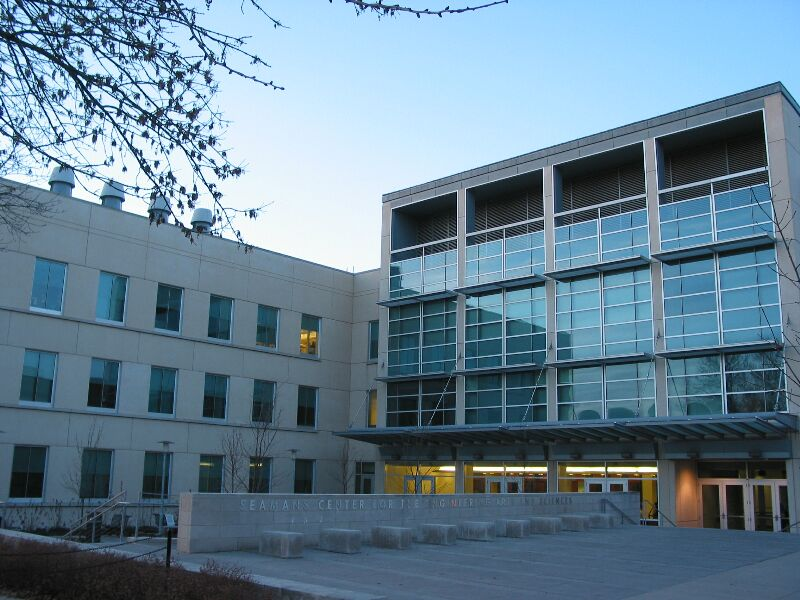
Seamans Center for the Engineering Arts and Sciences

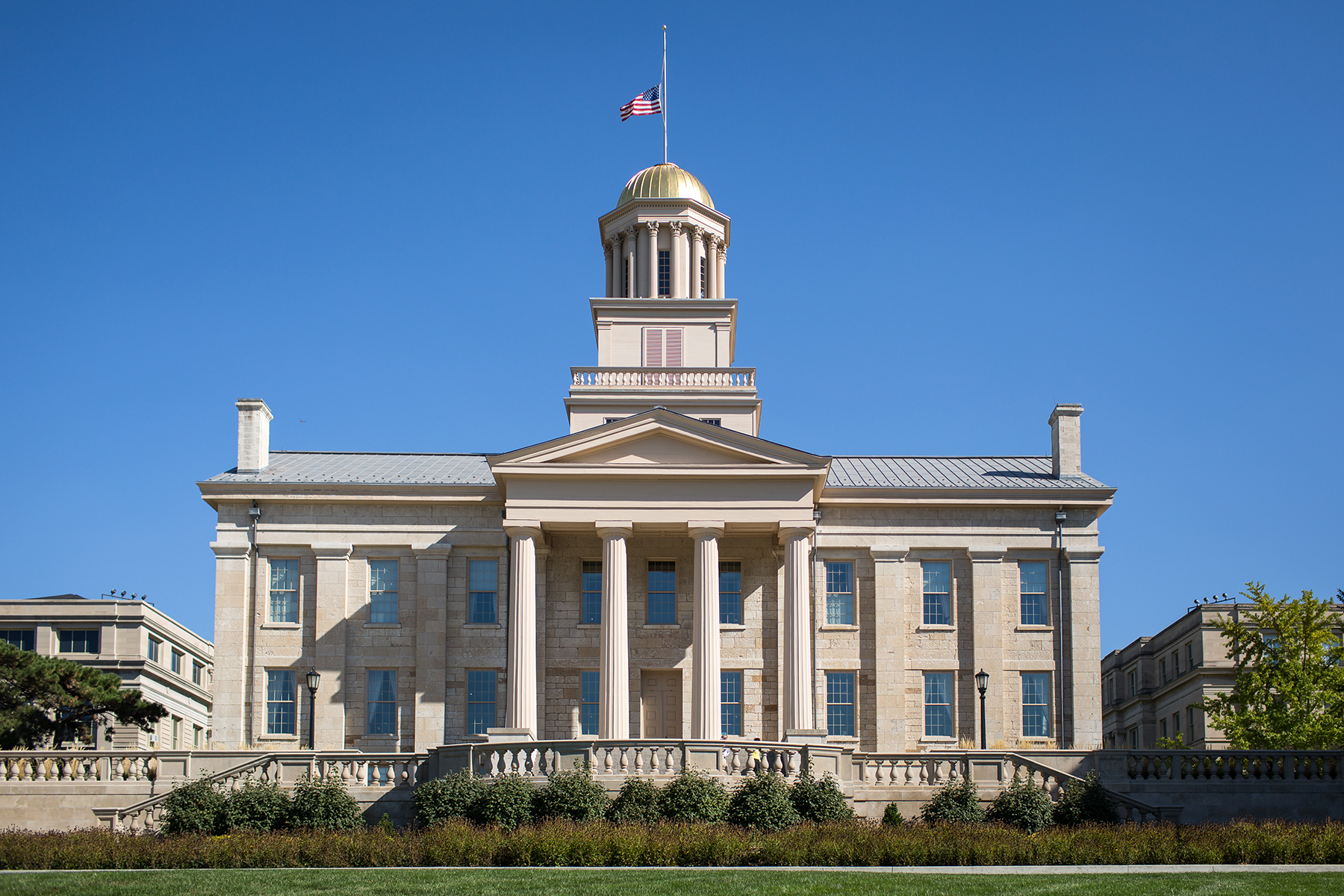
The Old Iowa State Capitol sits at the center of The Pentacrest

The University of Iowa's main campus is in Iowa City. The campus is roughly bordered by Park Road and U.S. Highway 6 to the north and Dubuque and Gilbert streets to the east. The Iowa River flows through the campus, dividing it into west and east sides.

Of architectural note is the Pentacrest which comprises five major buildings—Old Capitol, Schaeffer Hall, MacLean Hall, Macbride Hall, and Jessup Hall—at the center of the University of Iowa Campus. The Pentacrest reflects the Beaux-Arts in addition to Greek Revival architectural styles and the Collegiate Gothic architecture, which is dominant in sections of the campus east of the Iowa River. The Old Capitol was once the home of the state legislature and the primary government building for the State of Iowa but is now the symbolic heart of the university with a restored ceremonial legislative chamber and a museum of Iowa history.

Also on the east side of the campus are six residence halls (Burge, Daum, Stanley, Currier, Mayflower, and Catlett), the Iowa Memorial Union, the Women's Resource & Action Center, the Pappajohn Business Building, Seamans Center for the Engineering Arts and Sciences, the Lindquist Center (home of the College of Education), Phillips Hall (the foreign language building), Van Allen Hall (home to physics and astronomy), Trowbridge Hall (home to Earth & Environmental Sciences, as well as the Iowa Geological Survey), the English-Philosophy Building, the Becker Communication Building, the Adler Journalism Building, Voxman Music Building, and the buildings for biology, chemistry, and psychology. The Main Library can also be found on the east side.

The Colleges of Law, Medicine, Nursing, Dentistry, Pharmacy, and Public health are on the west side of the Iowa River, along with the University of Iowa Hospitals and Clinics, Art Building West and Visual Arts Building, and the Theatre Building. Additionally, five residence halls (Hillcrest, Slater, Rienow, Parklawn, and Petersen), Kinnick Stadium, and Carver-Hawkeye Arena are located on the west campus.

The campus is home to several museums, including the University of Iowa Stanley Museum of Art, the Museum of Natural History, the Old Capitol Museum, the Medical Museum, the Athletic Hall of Fame and Museum, and Project Art at the University Hospitals and Clinics.

A flood of the Iowa River in 2008 had a major impact on several campus buildings, forcing many to temporarily or permanently close. The upper levels of the Iowa Memorial Union remained open while its lower level was renovated. The arts campus, which included Art Building West, Old Art Building, Hancher Auditorium, Voxman Music Building, Clapp Recital Hall, and the Theatre Building, sustained significant damage. Art Building West reopened in 2012 after repairs were completed. Sections of Old Art Building were razed, leaving only the historic WPA-era building, which includes regionalist artist Grant Wood's former studio. Esteemed artists Elizabeth Catlett, Ana Mendieta, and Charles Ray were all trained in this building. The new Visual Arts Building was opened on a higher plot of land adjacent to Art Building West in 2016 after years when studio arts were housed in a temporary facility. Hancher Auditorium was rebuilt near its current site on the West bank of the Iowa River, and Voxman Music Hall was constructed adjacent to downtown Iowa City and the main campus on South Clinton Street. The new Hancher Auditorium and the new Voxman Music Building opened in 2016.

The Oakdale Campus, which is home to some of the university's research facilities and the driving simulator, is located north of Interstate 80 in adjacent Coralville.

=== Campus public art collection ===
The University of Iowa holds and continues to commission an extensive collection of public art. The program began under the Iowa State 'Art in State Buildings Program,' one of the first percent for art programs in the United States since repealed in 2017. The collection includes many important works, including works by artists Sol LeWitt (2-3-1-1, 1994), El Anatsui (Anonymous Creature 2009), Dale Chihuly (Forest Amber and Gilded Chandelier, 2004), Auguste Rodin (Jean de Fiennes, draped, 1889), and Peter Randall-Page (Ridge and Furrow, 2011).

=== Sustainability ===
The University of Iowa is one of the EPA's Green Power Partners, burning oat hulls instead of coal and reducing coal consumption by 20%. In May 2004, the university joined the Chicago Climate Exchange, and in April 2009, a student garden was opened.

The university also offers a Certificate in Sustainability through the Office of Sustainability (OS). The OS recently coordinated the university's first sustainability plan: "2020 Vision UIowa Sustainability Targets," proposed by UI president Sally Mason on October 29, 2010.

== Organization and administration ==
The Iowa Board of Regents, a statewide body, governs the University of Iowa, as well as the state's two other public universities (Iowa State University and the University of Northern Iowa), along with certain other institutions. Created by the Iowa General Assembly in 1909, the board is composed of nine volunteer members appointed by the governor and confirmed by the Iowa Senate to serve staggered six-year terms. The Iowa Board of Regents hires the president of the University of Iowa and the university president reports to the board. The 22nd and current president of the University of Iowa is Barbara J. Wilson, who has served since July 15, 2021.

== Undergraduate admissions ==
Undergraduate admissions statistics
- 2021 entering class
- Admit rate: 86.2 (▲ +2.1)
- Yield rate: 23.4 ( −0.1)

Test scores middle 50%
- SAT Total: 1140-1330 (among 18% of FTFs)
- ACT Composite: 22-29 (among 65% of FTFs)

The 2022 annual ranking of U.S. News & World Report categorizes UIowa as "more selective." For the Class of 2025 (enrolled fall 2021), UIowa received 22,434 applications and accepted 19,340 (86.2%). Of those accepted, 4,521 enrolled, a yield rate (the percentage of accepted students who choose to attend the university) of 23.4%. UIowa's freshman retention rate is 88%, with 73.7% going on to graduate within six years.

Of the 65% of enrolled freshmen in 2021 who submitted ACT scores; the middle 50 percent Composite score was between 22 and 29. Of the 18% of the incoming freshman class who submitted SAT scores; the middle 50 percent Composite scores were 1140-1330.

University of Iowa is a college-sponsor of the National Merit Scholarship Program and sponsored 24 Merit Scholarship awards in 2020. In the 2020–2021 academic year, 31 freshman students were National Merit Scholars.

Fall First-Time Freshman Statistics
	2021	2020	2019	2018	2017	2016
Applicants	22,434	24,132	25,928	26,706	27,734	28,494
Admits	19,340	20,338	21,404	22,077	23,862	23,967
Admit rate	86.2	84.3	82.6	82.7	86.0	84.1
Enrolled	4,521	4,510	4,986	4,806	5,027	5,643
Yield rate	23.4	22.2	23.3	21.8	21.1	23.5
ACT composite* (out of 36)	22-29 (65%^{†})	22-29 (87%^{†})	22-29 (87%^{†})	23-28 (90%^{†})	23-28 (95%^{†})	23-28 (92%^{†})
SAT composite* (out of 1600)	1140-1330 (18%^{†})	1130-1310 (27%^{†})	1140-1330 (29%^{†})	1120-1330 (26%^{†})	1140-1370 (9%^{†})	—
* middle 50% range^{†} percentage of first-time freshmen who chose to submit

== Academics ==
College/school founding
College/school	Year founded
Carver College of Medicine	1870
College of Dentistry	1882
College of Education	1872
College of Engineering	1904
College of Law	1865
College of Liberal Arts and Sciences	1900
College of Nursing	1949
College of Pharmacy	1885
College of Public Health	1999
Graduate College	1908
Tippie College of Business	1921
University College	2005

The University of Iowa is categorized as an R1 doctoral research university and has been a member of the Association of American Universities since 1909. The university is home to ISCABBS, a public bulletin board system that was the world's largest Internet community before the commercialization of the World Wide Web.

The Iowa Writers' Workshop was founded in 1936 and was the nation's first graduate program in creative writing. Since 1947, workshop alumni have won seventeen Pulitzer Prize winners and close to fifty alumni or faculty associated with the university have won a Pulitzer Prize. Its history of eminence in fiction, non-fiction, poetry, playwriting, journalism and communications have earned it the moniker "The Writing University". The Hanson Center for Technical Communication was founded at The University of Iowa and named after a 1960 graduate, Thomas R. Hanson, who funded the institution with $800,000.

The university has educated many of the state's professionals, including 79% of Iowa's dentists, 50% of physicians, 48% of pharmacists, as well as many teachers and administrators in each of the state's K–12 school districts.

=== Rankings ===
Academic rankings

National
- Forbes: 155
- U.S. News & World Report: 98
- Washington Monthly: 110
- WSJ/College Pulse: 169

Global
- QS: =530
- THE: 201–250
- U.S. News & World Report: 180

In 2025, the University of Iowa tied for 98th among national universities, tied for 46th among public universities, placed 113th among "Best Value Schools," tied for 4th for Nursing, 10th in "Writing in the Disciplines" and tied for 394th in "Top Performers on Social Mobility" by U.S. News & World Report.

In graduate school rankings for 2021, U.S. News & World Report ranked Iowa's Carver College of Medicine tied for 20th in the U.S. for primary care and tied for 34th for research. Its College of Public Health tied for 19th, its College of Pharmacy tied for 18th, its College of Law tied for 27th, and its Nursing School tied for 21st. U.S. News & World Report also ranked 9 University of Iowa graduate programs among the top 25 in the United States for 2021.

Forbes ranked the University of Iowa 155th out of the top 500 rated private and public colleges and universities in America for the 2024-25 report. The University of Iowa was also ranked 68th among public colleges and 20th in the Midwest. In 2019 the University of Iowa was ranked as America's 99th "Best Value College".

According to the National Science Foundation, Iowa spent $511 million on research and development in 2018, ranking it 51st in the United States.

=== Research institutes ===
- Institute of Agricultural Medicine. The Institute of Agricultural Medicine was established in 1955 to study rural public health issues with a grant from the W. K. Kellogg Foundation. It was later renamed the Institute of Agricultural Medicine and Occupational Health.
- IIHR–Hydroscience & Engineering (Iowa Institute of Hydraulic Research). IIHR—Hydroscience & Engineering is a world-renowned center for education, research, and public service focusing on hydraulic engineering and fluid mechanics. Based in the C. Maxwell Stanley Hydraulics Laboratory, a five-story red brick building on the banks of the Iowa River, IIHR is a unit of the University of Iowa's College of Engineering. Because of its contributions to water's study and use, the American Society of Civil Engineers recognized the Stanley Hydraulics Lab as a National Historic Civil Engineering Landmark. The ASCE distinguishes the lab as the "oldest university-based hydraulics laboratory in the nation continuously focusing on research and education in hydraulic engineering."
- Obermann Center for Advanced Studies

=== Libraries ===
The University of Iowa library system is the state's largest library and comprises the Main Library, the Hardin Library for the Health Sciences, five branch libraries, and the Law Library. The University Libraries' holdings include more than five million bound volumes, more than 200,000 rare books, and 1000 historical manuscript collections. Significant holdings include Hardin Library's John Martin Rare Book Room, the Iowa Women's Archives, the Louis Szathmary culinary arts collections, the Ruth and Marvin Sackner Archive of Concrete and Visual Poetry, science fiction collections, and works of Walt Whitman. The comic books collection in the Special Collections contains original art for 6,000 cartoons, film and television scripts, magazines and other underground or amateur publications, as well as mainstream books from throughout the 20th and 21st centuries.

== Student life ==
Student body composition as of September 2024
Race and ethnicity	Total
White	75%
Hispanic	9%
Asian	5%
Two or more races	4%
Black	3%
Unknown	3%
Foreign national	2%
Economic diversity
Low-income (Note: The percentage of students who received an income-based federal Pell grant intended for low-income students.)	19%
Affluent (Note: The percentage of students who are a part of the American middle class at the bare minimum.)	81%

There are also over 500 student organizations, including groups focused on politics, sports, games, lifestyles, dance, song, theater, and a variety of other activities. The university also tries to sponsor events that give students an alternative to the typical drinking scene. In 2004 the university established an annual $25,000 contract with the newly reopened Iowa City Englert Theatre to host concerts and performances for as many as 40 nights a year. Students participate in a variety of student media organizations. For example, students edit and manage The Daily Iowan newspaper (often called the DI), which is printed every Monday through Friday while classes are in session. Noted pollster George Gallup was an early editor of the DI. Daily Iowan TV, KRUI Radio, Student Video Productions, Off Deadline magazine, and Earthwords magazine are other examples of student-run media.

== Athletics ==
The University of Iowa has 22 varsity athletic teams, known as the Hawkeyes. All teams are members of the Big Ten Conference in the National Collegiate Athletic Association's Division I. There are 10 men's teams and 12 women's teams. Three of these teams—men's gymnastics, men's swimming and diving, and men's tennis—were eliminated after the 2020–21 academic year to help address a projected $60–75 million deficit related to the COVID-19 pandemic.

=== Wrestling ===
Iowa's most successful team is men's wrestling, which has won 24 of the school's 26 NCAA championships. Fifteen of those championships occurred during Dan Gable's 21-year tenure as head coach (1977–1997). It has 35 Big Ten titles, 81 individual NCAA Titles, and has graduated 17 Olympians. The team is currently coached by alumnus Tom Brands.

=== Football ===
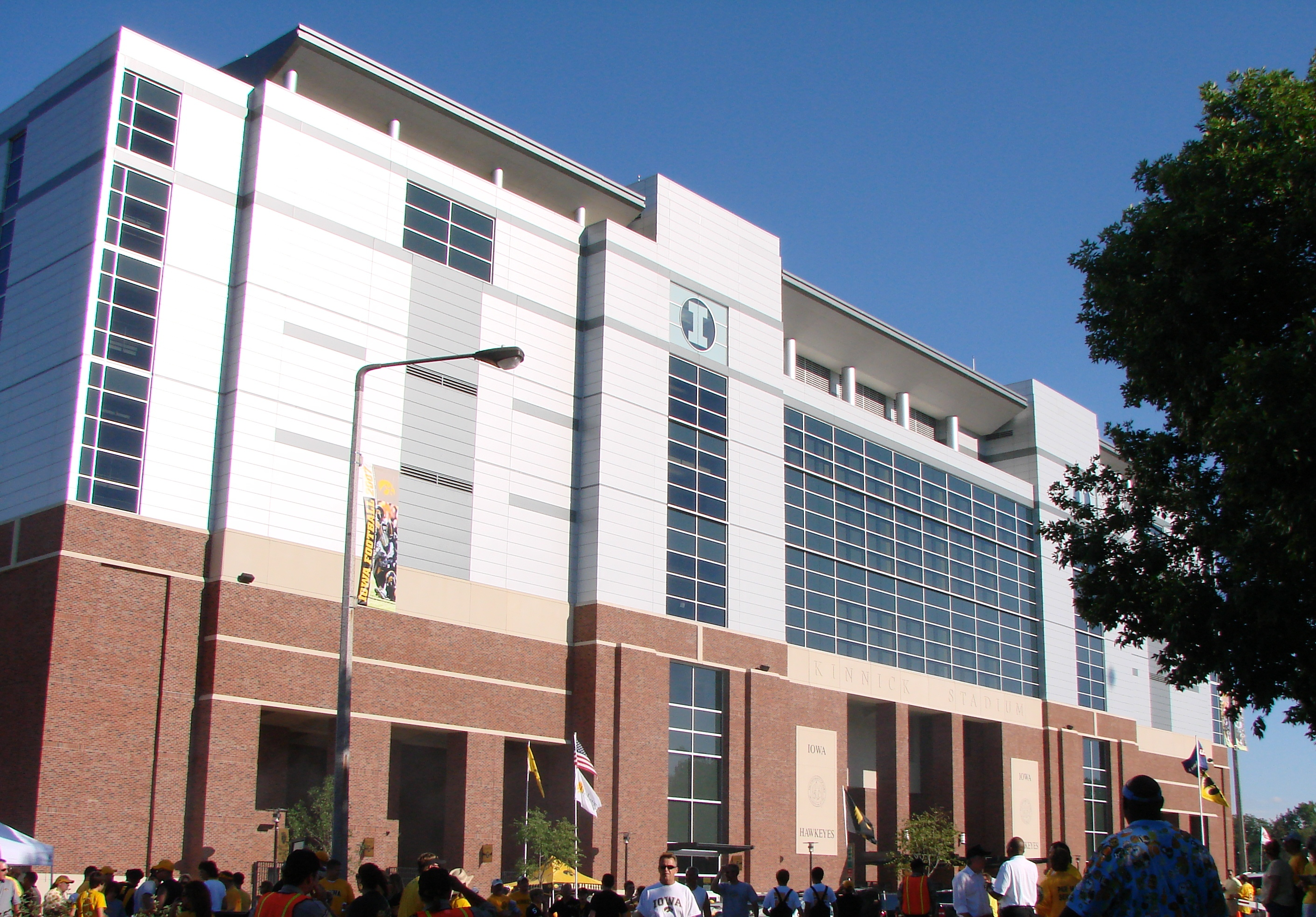
The facade of the west stand of Kinnick Stadium

Iowa's football team is one of the most financially valuable college programs in the country. They have won 11 Big Ten championships and claim 5 national championships. The program has produced 10 members of the College Football Hall of Fame, 27 consensus first-team All-Americans, 5 members of the Pro Football Hall of Fame and 245 NFL Draft Picks. The team is currently coached by Kirk Ferentz, who has completed his 23rd year following coach Hayden Fry, who coached the previous 20 seasons.

=== Field hockey ===
Iowa's field hockey team is the most successful women's team at the university, winning the 1986 national championship. They have won 13 conference titles and have made 11 Final Four appearances in the 33-year history of the NCAA tournament, despite field hockey not being a high school sport in Iowa. The program has produced 85 All-Americans and 13 Olympians. The program is currently coached by Lisa Celluci.

=== Other sports ===
Other sports at the university include basketball, soccer, baseball, softball, gymnastics, golf, swimming and diving, tennis, track and field, volleyball, cross country, and rowing. Most of the school's athletic facilities are located on the west end of campus. The largest venue is the 70,585-seat Kinnick Stadium, home to the football program. Opening in 1929 as Iowa Stadium, it was renamed in 1977 after Nile Kinnick, winner of the 1939 Heisman Trophy. The basketball, wrestling, gymnastics, and volleyball teams play at Carver-Hawkeye Arena, which seats 15,400. Other venues include the Beckwith Boathouse, Duane Banks Field, and the old Iowa Fieldhouse.

== Notable alumni and faculty ==
Among the thousands of graduates from the University of Iowa, especially notable alumni include George Gallup, founder of the Gallup Poll (BA, 1923; MA 1925; PhD 1928); Tennessee Williams, leading 20th century playwright and author of "A Streetcar Named Desire" and "Cat on a Hot Tin Roof" (BA 1938); Gene Wilder, comedic film and television actor (BA 1955, Communication and Theatre Arts); James Van Allen, world-famous physicist and discoverer of the radiation belts (the Van Allen Belts) that surround the earth, Emeritus Carver Professor of Physics at the University of Iowa (MS 1936, PhD 1939, Physics); Mauricio Lasansky, Latin American artist known as the father of modern printmaking, founder of the University of Iowa's 'Iowa print group'; Albert Bandura, one of the most cited psychologists of all-time as originator of social cognitive theory (MA 1951, PhD 1952); (Mary) Flannery O'Connor, novelist and author of numerous short stories (MFA 1947, English); Sarai Sherman, a twentieth century modernist painter whose work is in major national and international collections; Sculptor Luther Utterback (1973 M.F.A.); John Irving, novelist who wrote The World According to Garp, A Prayer for Owen Meany, and several others (MFA 1967, English), writer Jenny Zhang; Andre Tippett, NFL Hall of Fame linebacker for the New England Patriots; Don Nelson, Boston Celtics star, NBA head coach and Naismith Hall of Fame member, and Luka Garza, two-time college basketball national player of the year currently playing in the NBA for the Boston Celtics. Jewel Prestage, the first African-American woman to earn a Ph.D. in political science, graduated with a master's and a doctorate in 1954. Tom Brokaw, Mark Mattson, Caitlin Clark, Technoblade, and Ashton Kutcher also attended the University of Iowa.

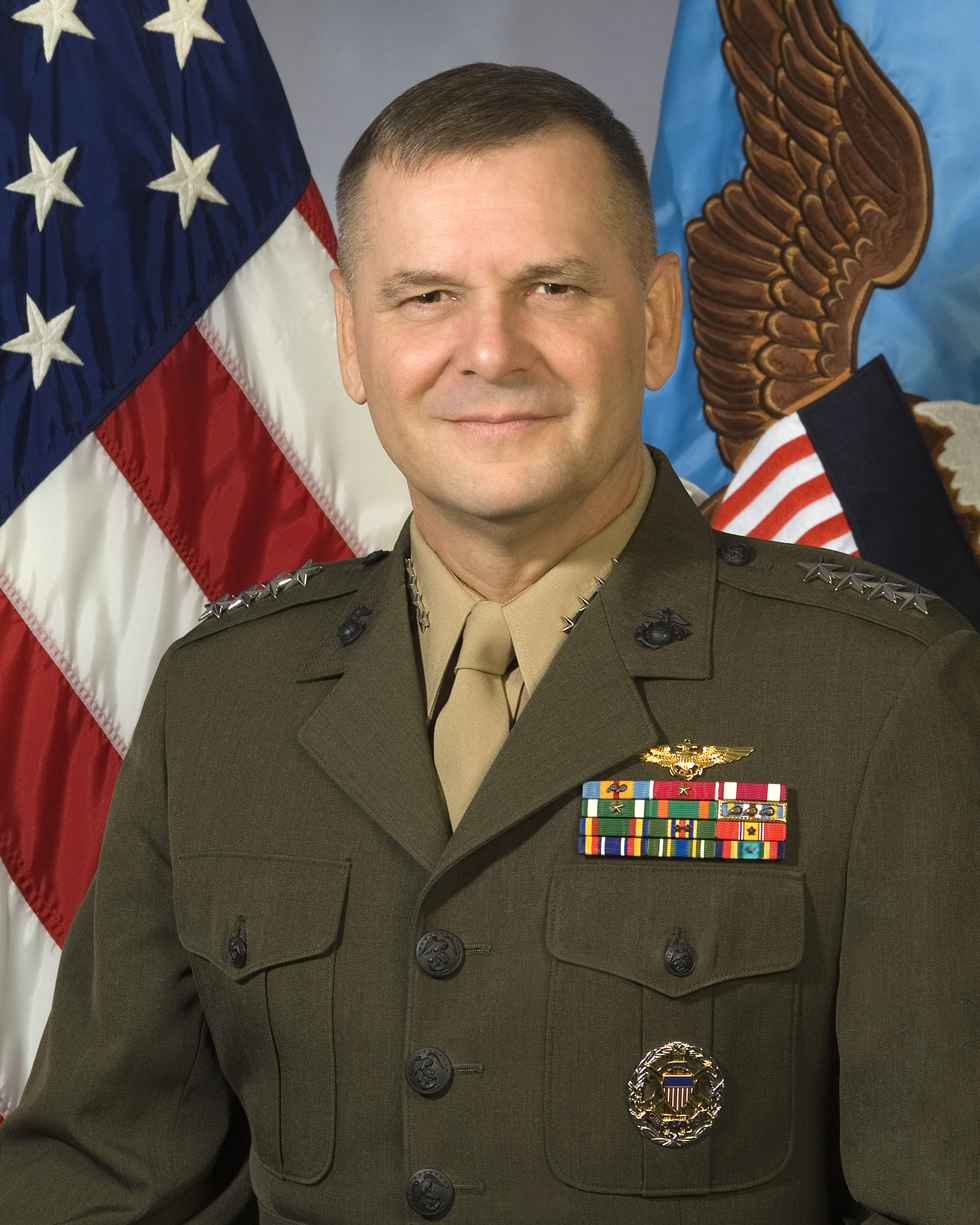
James Cartwright, former Vice Chairman of the Joint Chiefs of Staff

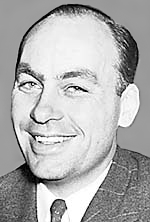
George Gallup, founder of Gallup Poll

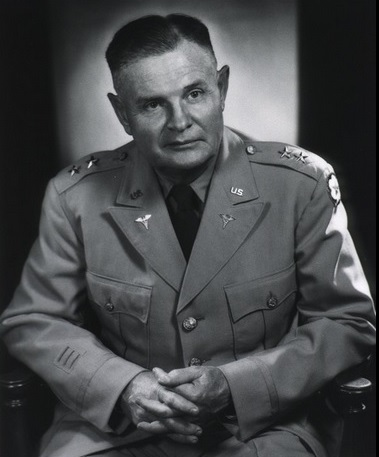
Silas B. Hays, former Surgeon General of the United States Army

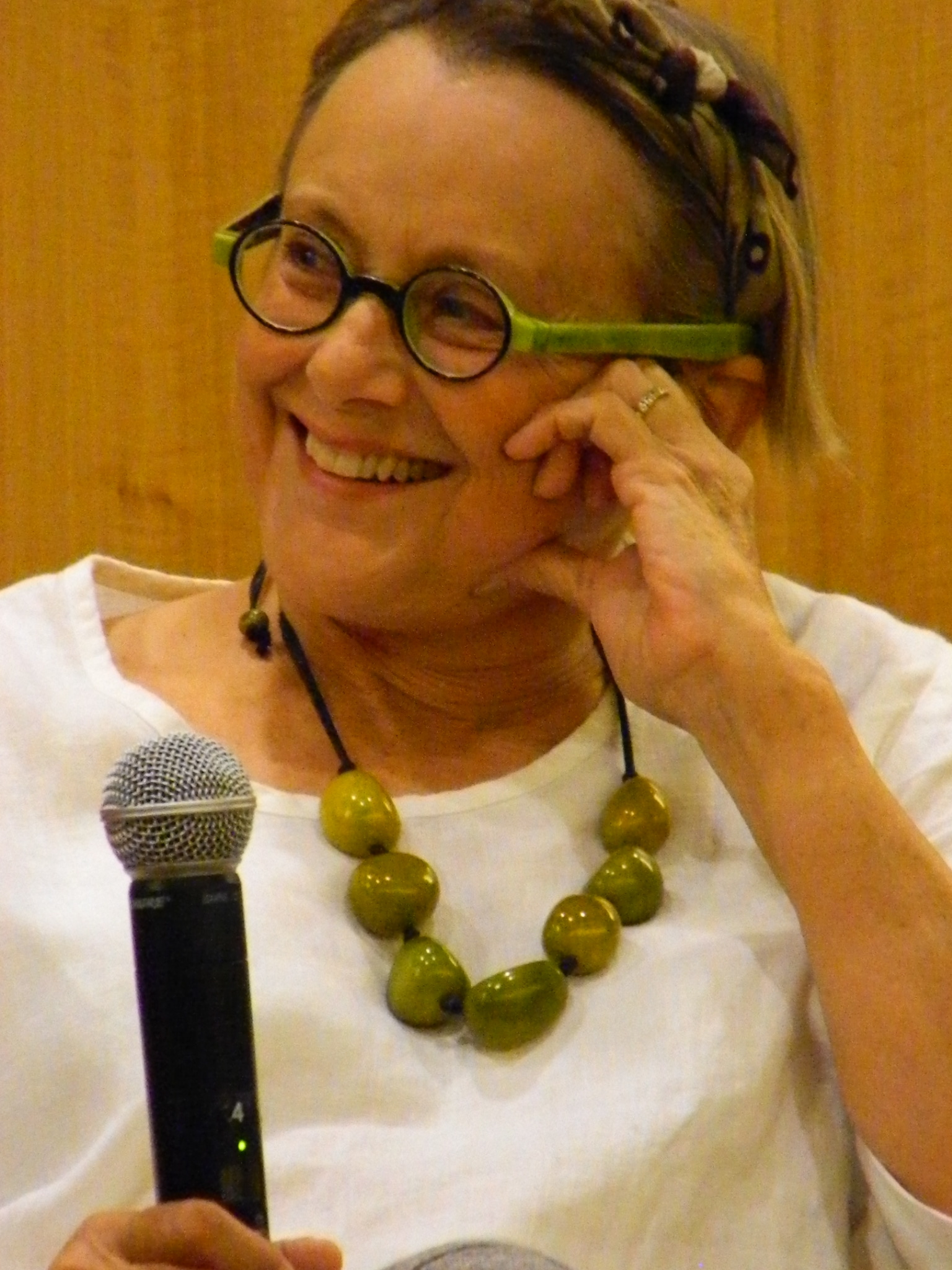
Mary Beth Hurt, Tony Award nominee

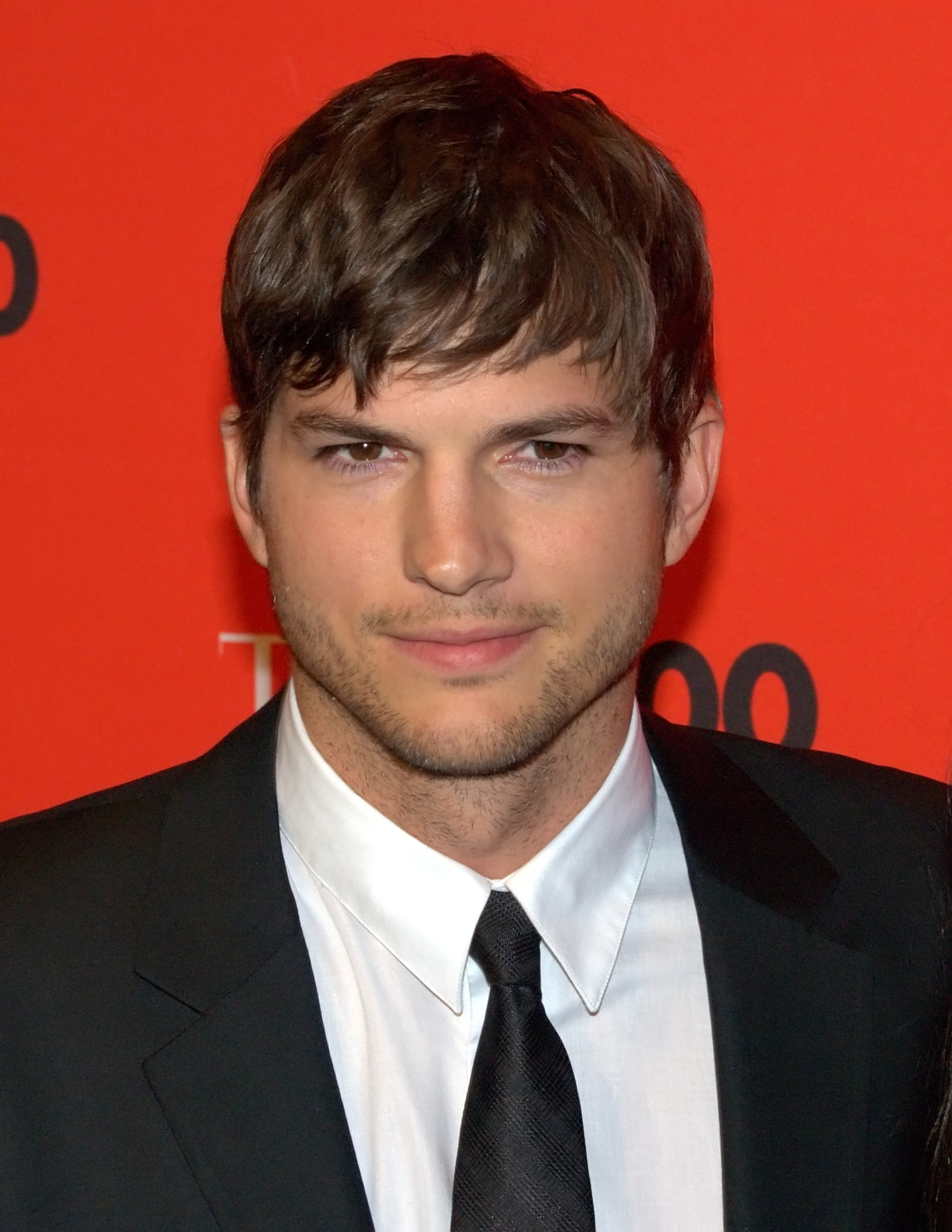
Ashton Kutcher, actor

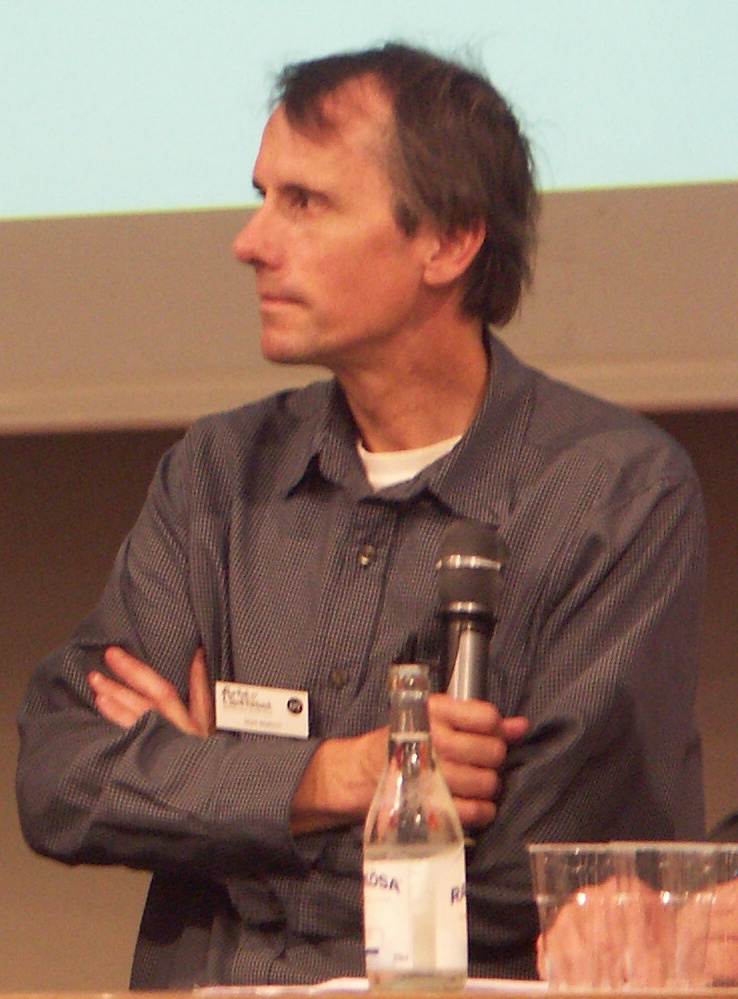
Mark Mattson, neuroscientist at the National Institutes of Health

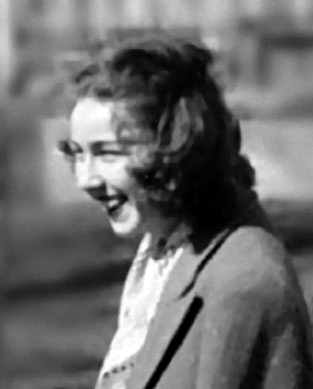
Flannery O'Connor, writer; winner of National Book Award for Fiction

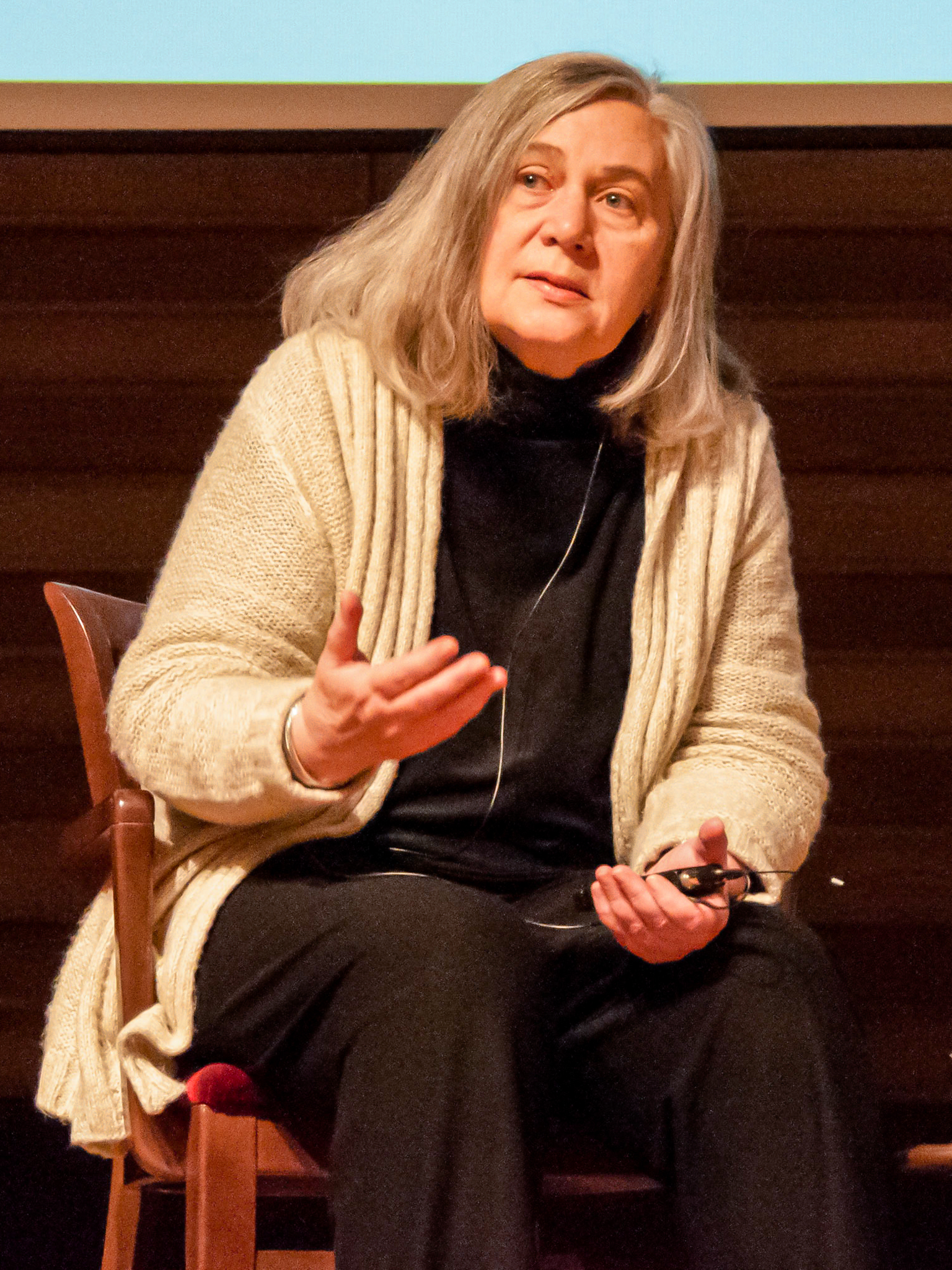
Marilynne Robinson, Pulitzer Prize-winning novelist

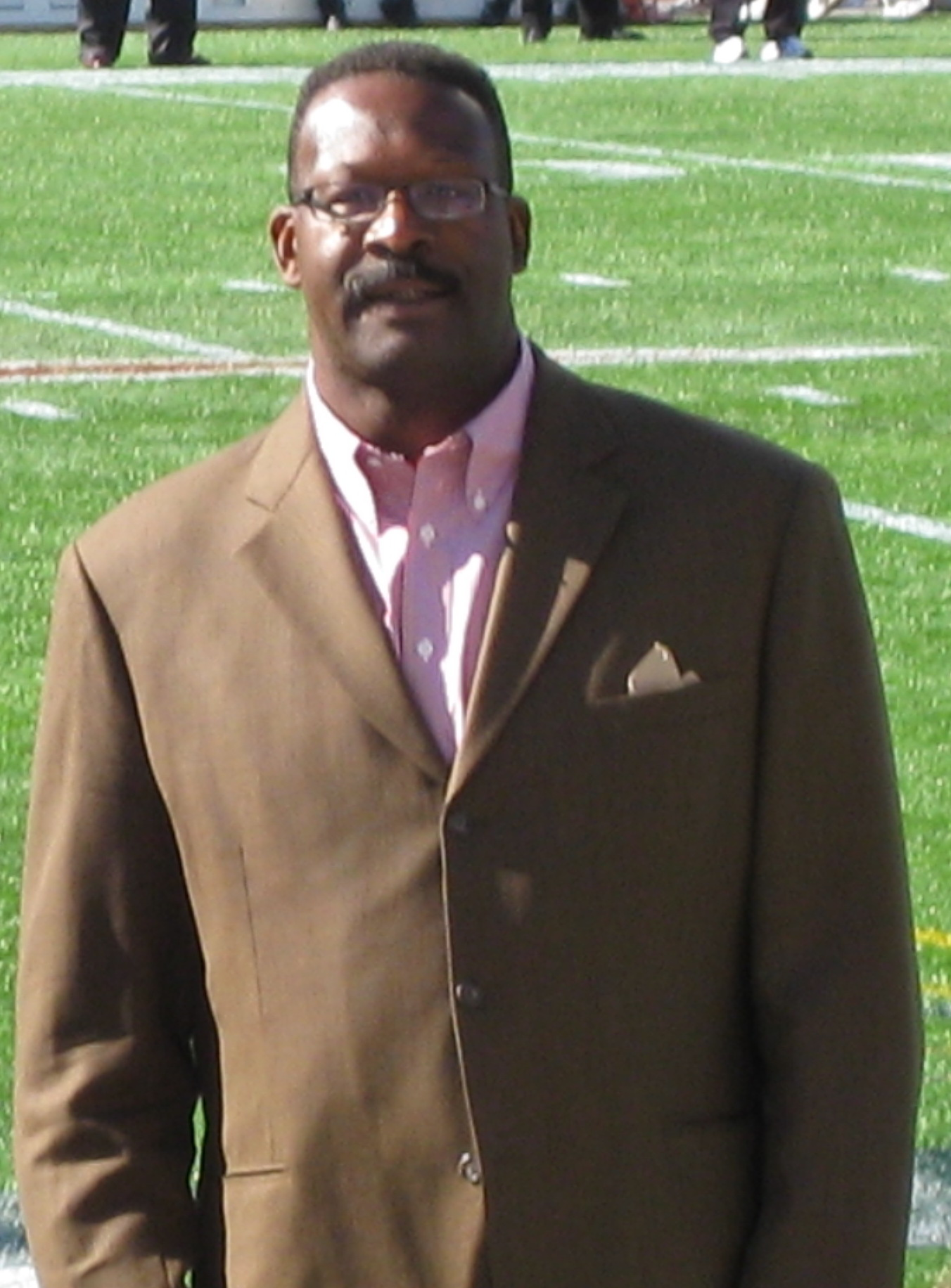
Andre Tippett, Hall of Fame football player

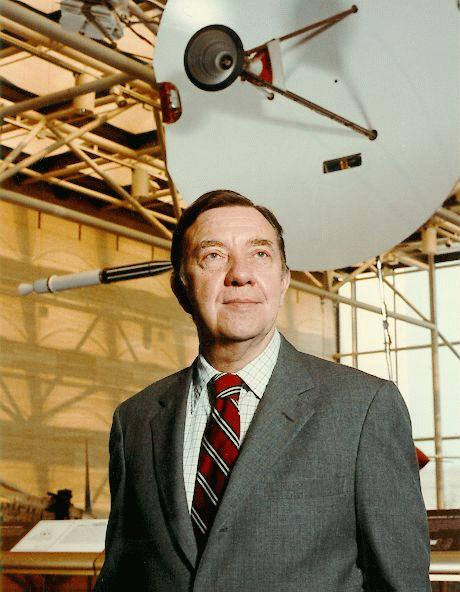
James Van Allen, pioneer space scientist

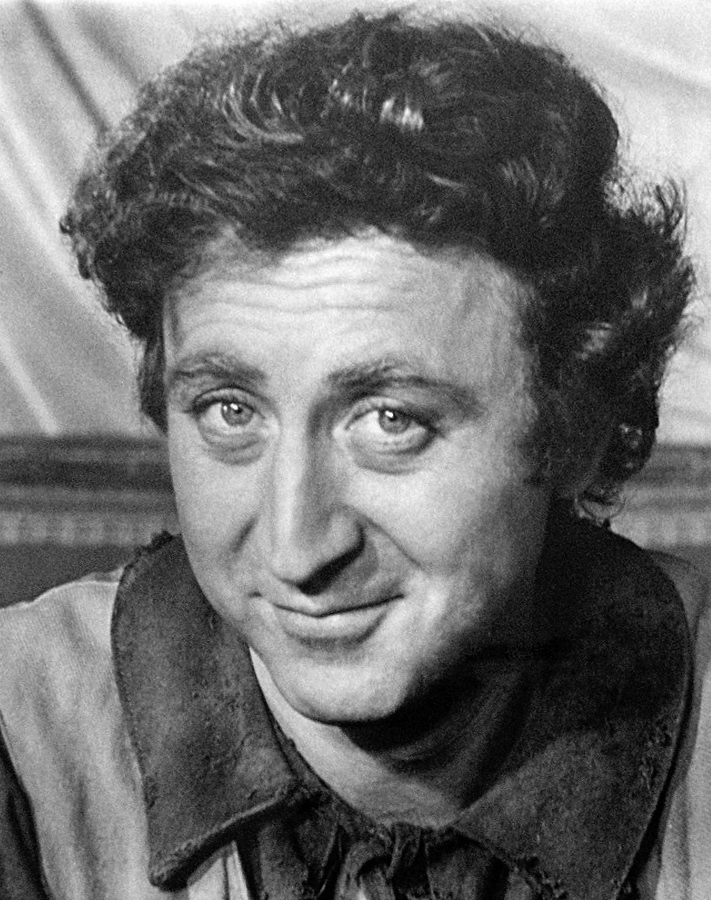
Gene Wilder, Academy Award nominee

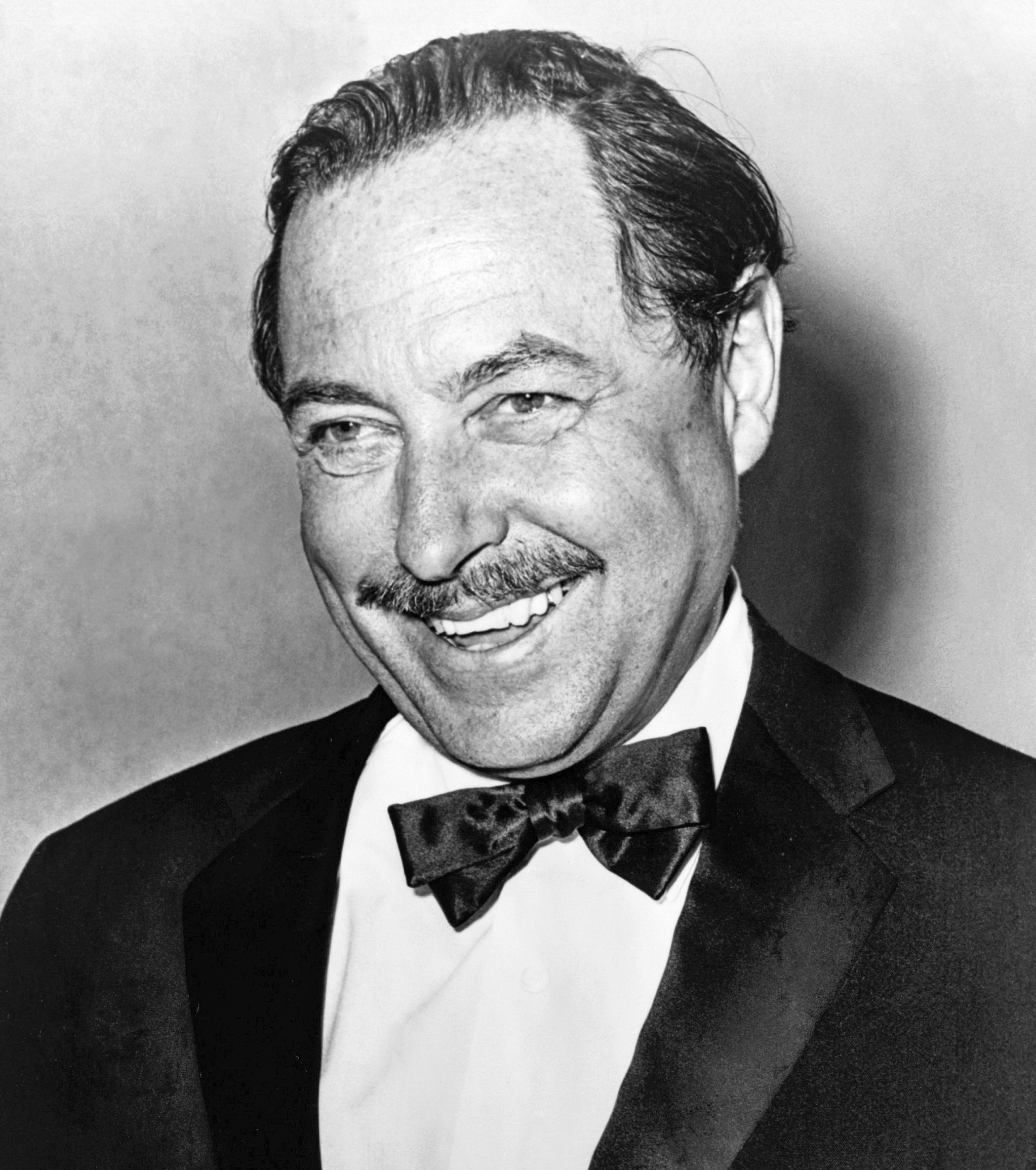
Tennessee Williams, Pulitzer Prize-winning playwright

== See also ==
- Monster Study
