= Luther Utterback =

American artist

Luther Ellsworth Utterback (July 18, 1947 – May 28, 1997) was an American artist, who primarily worked in sculpture and painting. He was known for his large-scale installations in public spaces and corporate buildings.

== Personal life and work ==
Utterback was born in Texas, the only child of Reverend Glenn Lester Utterback and Ruth Henderickson Utterback. Reverend soon moved his family to Nashua, Iowa so he could pastor the Little Brown Church.

== Career ==
In 1974, Utterback began serving as an instructor for the Department of Art and Art History at the University of Iowa. In 1975–1976, he was a visiting artist at the University of Wisconsin-Platteville. It was during this time, in early 1976, that the University of Iowa held a competition for a structural sculpture to be placed on the university's campus, near the Hancher Auditorium. Utterback was chosen, and, later in 1976, he completed the piece, which he entitled, “Untitled.”

Utterback moved to Brooklyn, New York in 1976. There he created a series of drawings on mylar, linen, and paper. He returned to Des Moines in 1979, after receiving a commission to create an art installation in the state capitol grounds of the Hoover State Office Building in Des Moines. That year he began construction on the piece he titled “Five Stones, One Tree”, which was completed in 1980.

In 1996, Utterback returned to New York to begin designing a large 1,000-acre art piece. It was envisioned as a planting reserve, incorporating four limestone “pyramid” structures and land covenants. However before construction could begin, in 1997 Utterback died aged 49 in Brooklyn, N.Y.

== Selected works ==
- Untitled – A stone installation on the campus of the University of Iowa, near the Hancher Auditorium. It consists of four large, rectangular, limestone blocks: three blocks standing, one block laying on its side. The blocks were cut at the Reed Quarries in Bloomington, Indiana, each block weighing approximately 40 tons. They were transported to Iowa City via train, where Utterback positioned them accordingly to his design.
- Five Stones, One Tree – An art installation in the green space of the Hoover State Office Building in Des Moines. It consists of two rough-cut limestone pillars, each containing two large stones, standing about 22 feet apart. The stones are oriented so that their smoothly textured sides face east and west, and their adjacent, naturally accreted sides face north and south. Between these pillars, the earth has settled in the form of a rectangle over a 16-ton block of limestone buried 6 feet below the surface. A Japanese ginkgo tree completed the design, forming an isosceles triangle between it and the two pillars. The Greater Des Moines Public Art Foundation wrote an interpretation and review of the piece.
