= Iowa Old Capitol Building =

Building at the University of Iowa

- Old Capitol
- U.S. National Register of Historic Places
- U.S. National Historic Landmark
- U.S. Historic district – Contributing property
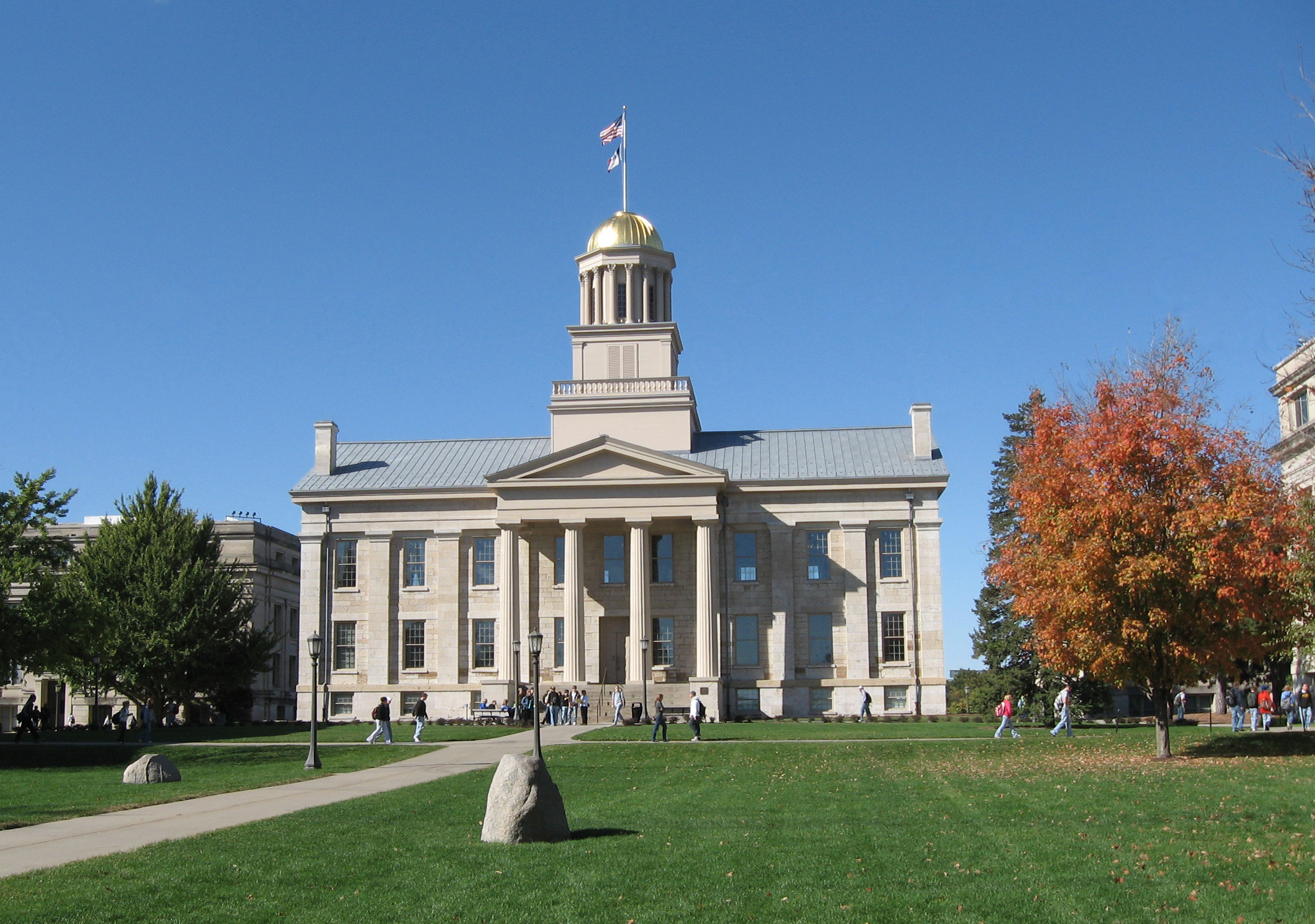
- Old Capitol, 2008

- Location within Iowa Location within the United States
- Interactive map showing the location of Iowa Old Capitol Building
- Location: Iowa City, Iowa, United States
- Coordinates: 41°39′40.8″N 91°32′08.3″W
- Built: 1842
- Architect: John F. Rague
- Architectural style: Greek Revival
- Part of: Pentacrest (ID78001230)
- NRHP reference No.: 72000475

Significant dates
- Added to NRHP: May 31, 1972
- Designated NHL: January 7, 1976

The Iowa Old Capitol Building is located in Iowa City, Iowa, United States. It was once the main government building for the state of Iowa, and it now stands as the most prominent landmark at the center of the University of Iowa's campus. The building was depicted on the 1946 Iowa Centennial commemorative half dollar. It was individually listed in the National Register of Historic Places (NRHP) in 1972, and it was named a U.S. National Historic Landmark in 1976. In 1978 it was included as a contributing property in the Pentacrest, a historic district listed on the NRHP.

== Government building ==
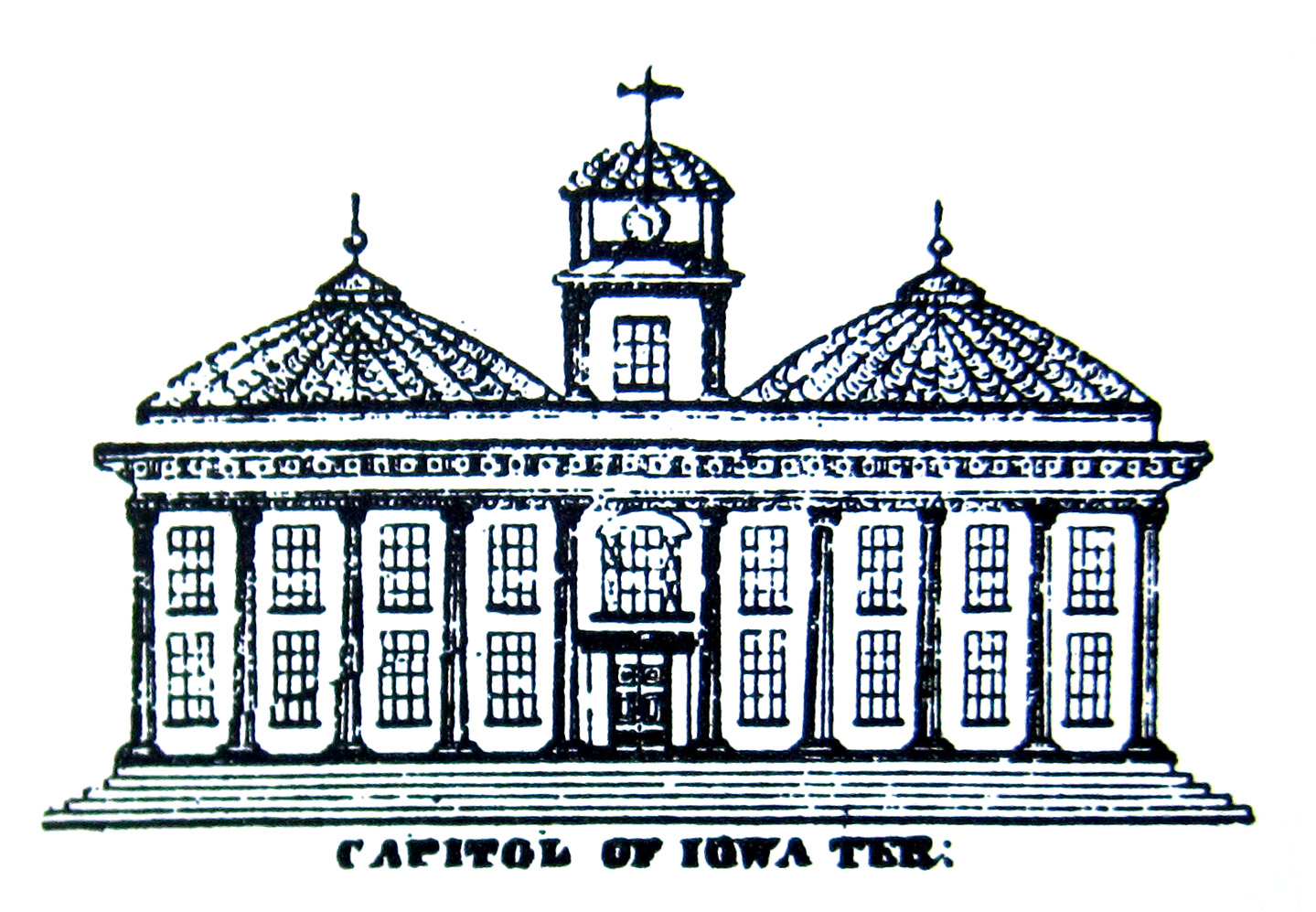
1839 sketch of planned Iowa capitol, from the original town plat

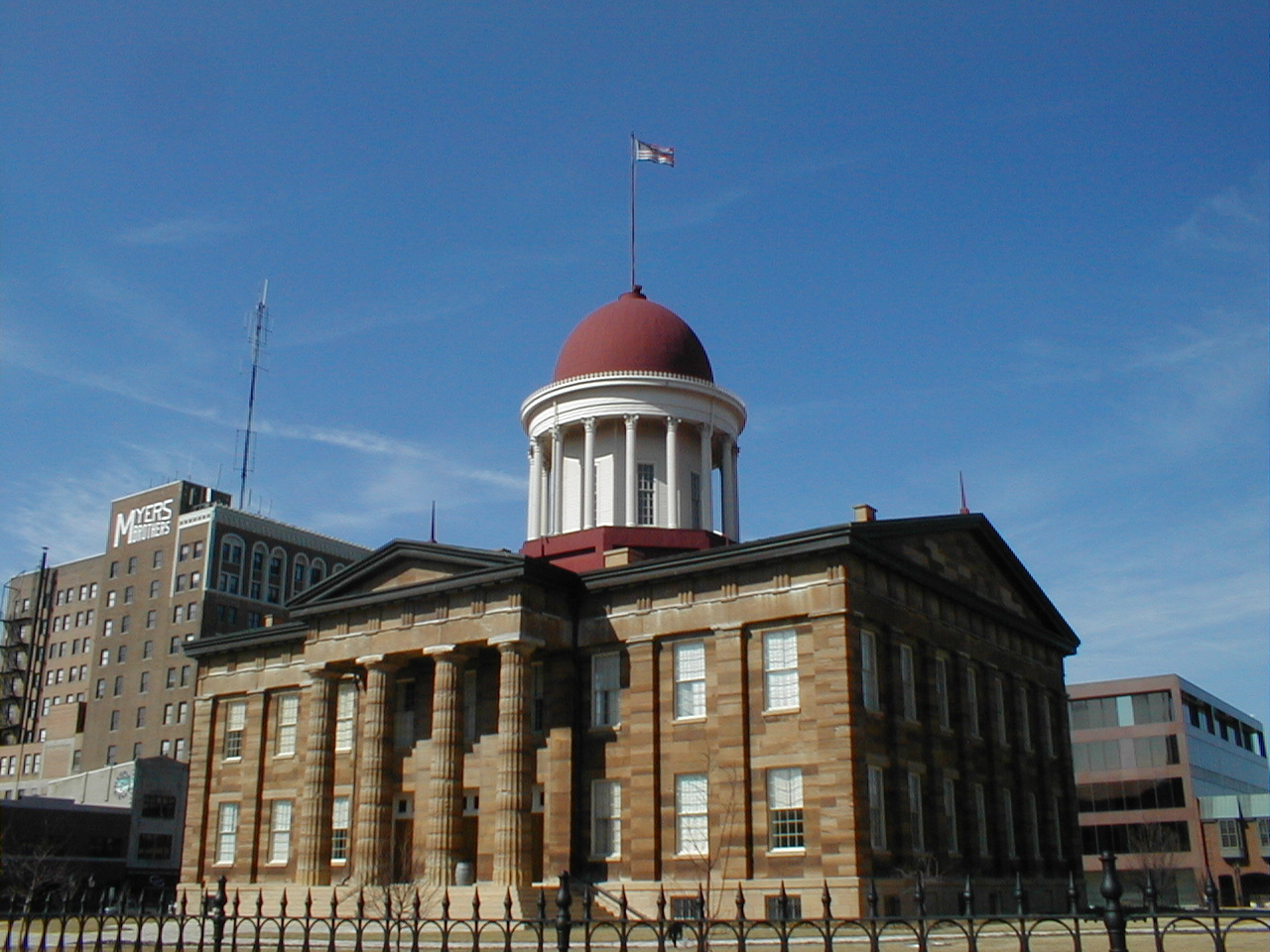
1837 Old Capitol of Illinois, the model for the 1840 Iowa Capitol

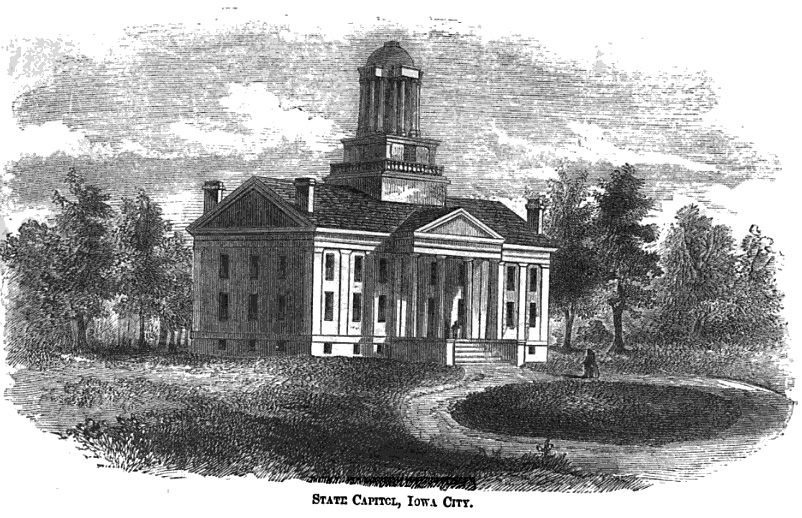
Iowa Capitol in 1855

John F. Rague is credited with designing the Territorial Capitol Building, although it is thought that missionary priest Father Samuel Mazzuchelli helped with the design also. Rague had previously designed the 1837 capitol of Illinois and was supervising its construction when he got the commission to design the new Iowa capitol in 1839. He quit the Iowa project after five months, claiming his design was not followed, but the resemblance to the Illinois capitol suggests he strongly influenced the final Iowa design. One surviving 1839 sketch of the proposed capital shows a radically different layout, with two domes and a central tower. The cornerstone of the Old Capitol Building was laid in Iowa City on July 4, 1840. Iowa City served as the third and last territorial capital of Iowa, and the last four territorial legislatures met at the Old Capitol Building until December 28, 1846, when Iowa was admitted into the United States as the 29th state of the union. Iowa City was declared the state capital of Iowa, and the government convened in the Old Capitol Building.

The Iowa constitution was crafted in the Old Capitol Building. The first governor of the state of Iowa was inaugurated there, and the first six Iowa general assemblies met in the building. 59 days after being admitted into the union, the state of Iowa passed legislation in the Old Capitol Building authorizing the formation of the state's first public university, the State University of Iowa, which is known today as The University of Iowa.

After ten years of housing the government in Iowa City, the state decided to move the seat of state government and build the Iowa State Capitol in Des Moines, a city located more toward the center of the state. When the state government moved to Des Moines in 1857, the Old Capitol Building became the first permanent building owned by the University of Iowa.

== Campus landmark and 1970s restoration ==
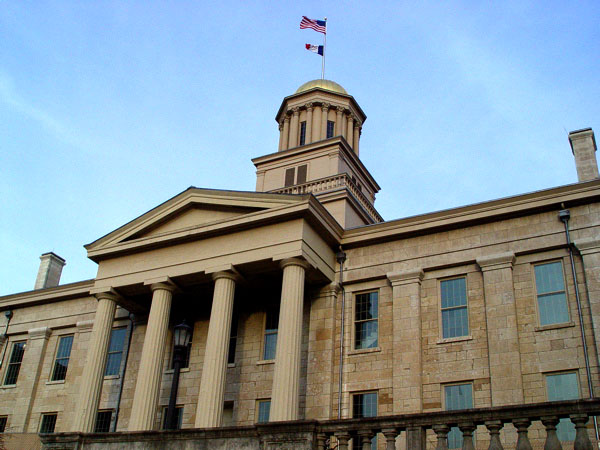
Old Capitol

The Old Capitol Building housed almost the entire university from 1857 to 1863. As the school grew, the Old Capitol remained the focal point of the university, serving as a library, chapel, and armory, and providing space for classrooms and offices.

The Old Capitol sits in the middle of the Pentacrest, five buildings in an X pattern at the center of the University of Iowa's campus. The four other buildings are Jessup Hall directly northwest of the Capitol, MacBride Hall to the northeast, MacLean Hall to the southwest, and Schaeffer Hall to the southeast.

The state of Iowa authorized a major renovation of the building in the 1920s, and it continued to function as a classroom and office building until the 1970s. University presidents had their offices there until the 1970s.

In 1970, the building needed another renovation. However, the university decided against converting the building into a modern office building. Instead, the offices were moved out, and with the leadership of educator and conservationist Margaret Keyes the university undertook a six-year interior renovation of the building, restoring most of it back to its original condition as a government building in the 1850s, and for use as a state historical museum. It was declared a National Historic Landmark on January 7, 1976. The Old Capitol Building reopened to the public on July 3, 1976.

== November 2001 fire and renovation ==
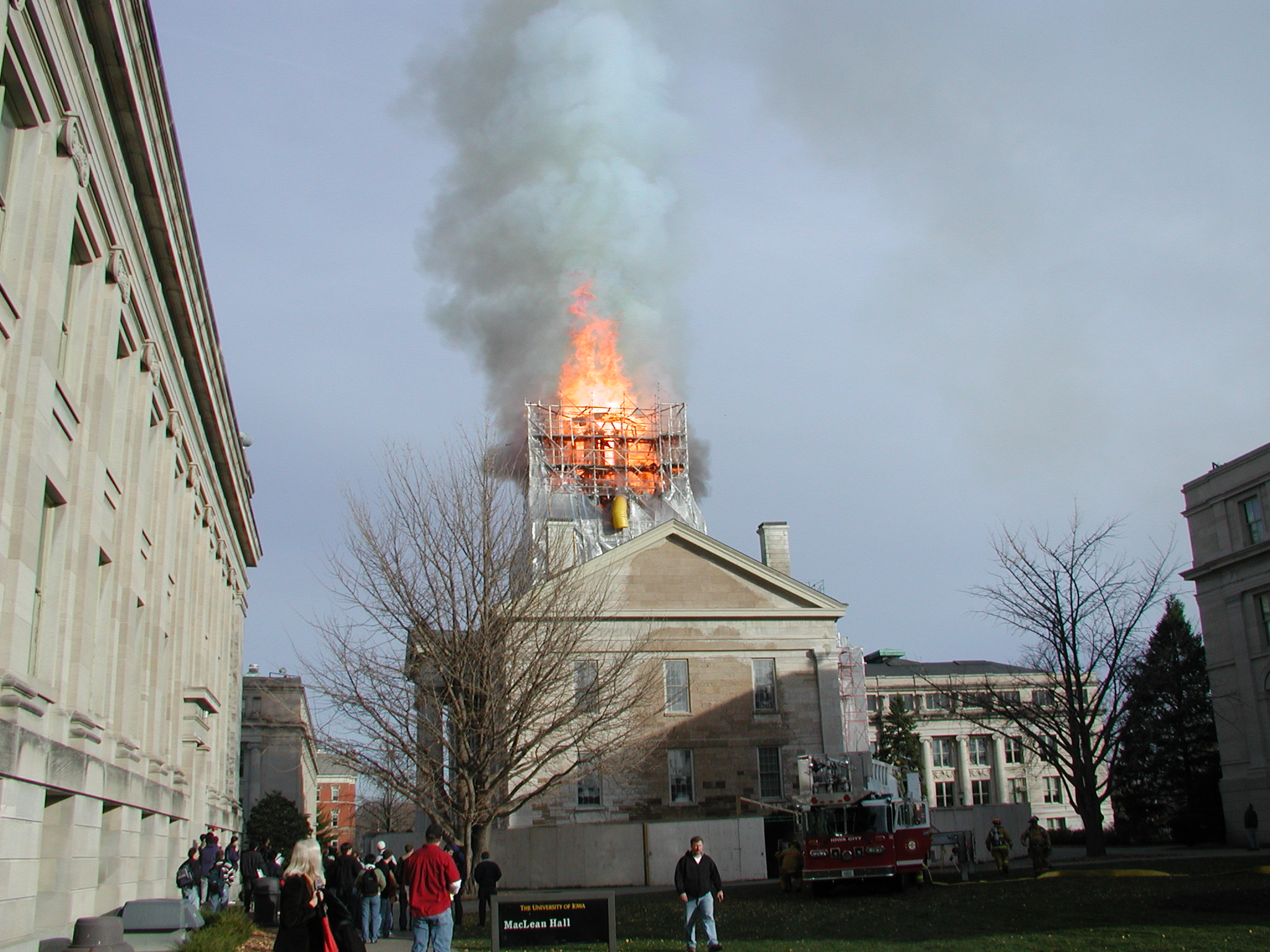
November 2001 Old Capitol Fire

The 1970s renovation restored the interior of the building to its original condition, but by the 1990s, it was apparent that the building needed exterior and structural repairs. The University of Iowa began another round of renovations to upgrade the Old Capitol Building. Part of the repairs called for asbestos to be removed from the Capitol's gold dome.

On November 20, 2001, contractors using open-flame torches and heat guns on the cupola supporting the building's gold dome accidentally set the cupola on fire. The fire was limited to the cupola of the building, thanks to a concrete slab firewall that had been installed during the 1920s renovation. The bell at the top of the Old Capitol was irreparably damaged, the dome was destroyed, and the tens of thousands of gallons of water used to douse the blaze caused major damage. The University of Iowa later settled a lawsuit with the contractors for $1.9 million.

In February 2003, a new, 12,000 pound wood dome was placed on top of the Old Capitol Building. The dome is covered with 23 3/4 carat gold leaf. A new bell was installed, and the old bell is on display inside the building.

== Today ==
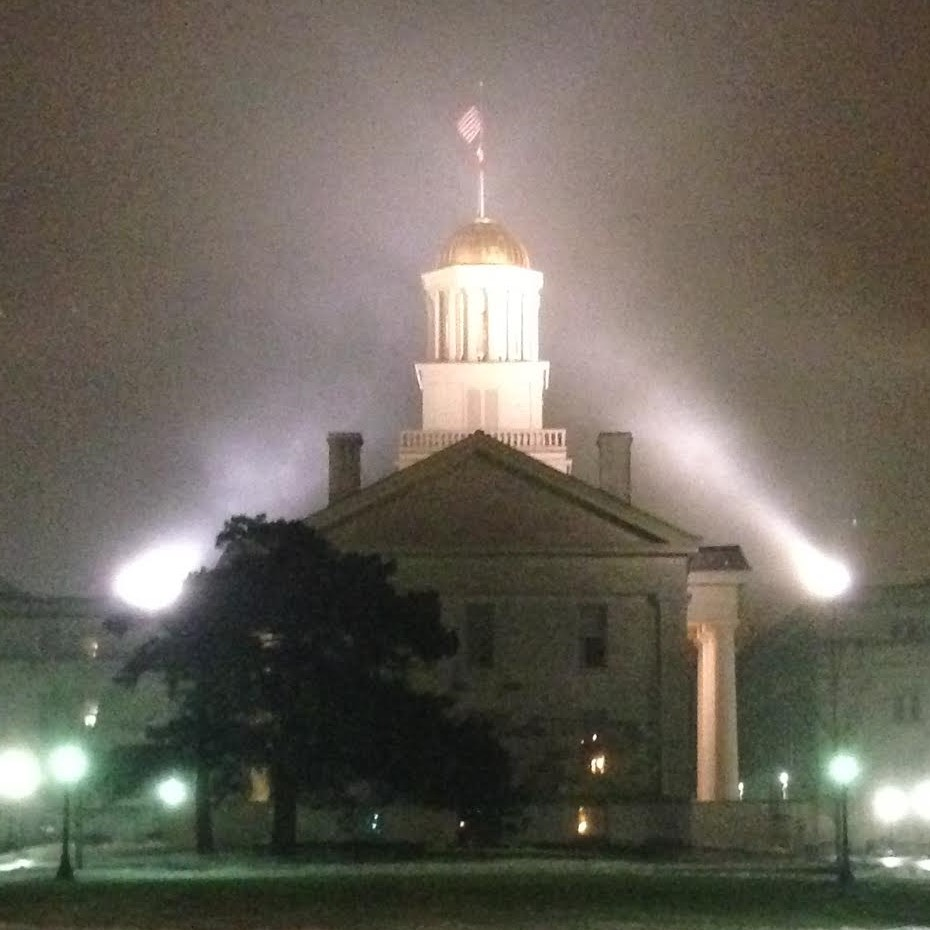
Old Capitol at night

On May 6, 2006, the Old Capitol Building was reopened to the public. The ground floor of the building is now a museum, with exhibits about the history of the building, the university, and the state of Iowa. University meetings and speeches can again take place at the Old Capitol, and as in the past, Ph.D. students often make their doctoral defenses in the chambers of the Old Capitol Building.

The University of Iowa's official logo is a graphic representation of the Old Capitol dome.

== See also ==
- List of the oldest buildings in Iowa
- Iowa State Capitol
- List of National Historic Landmarks in Iowa
- National Register of Historic Places listings in Johnson County, Iowa
