= Pentacrest =

Historic district in Iowa City, Iowa, US

- U.S. National Register of Historic Places
- U.S. Historic district
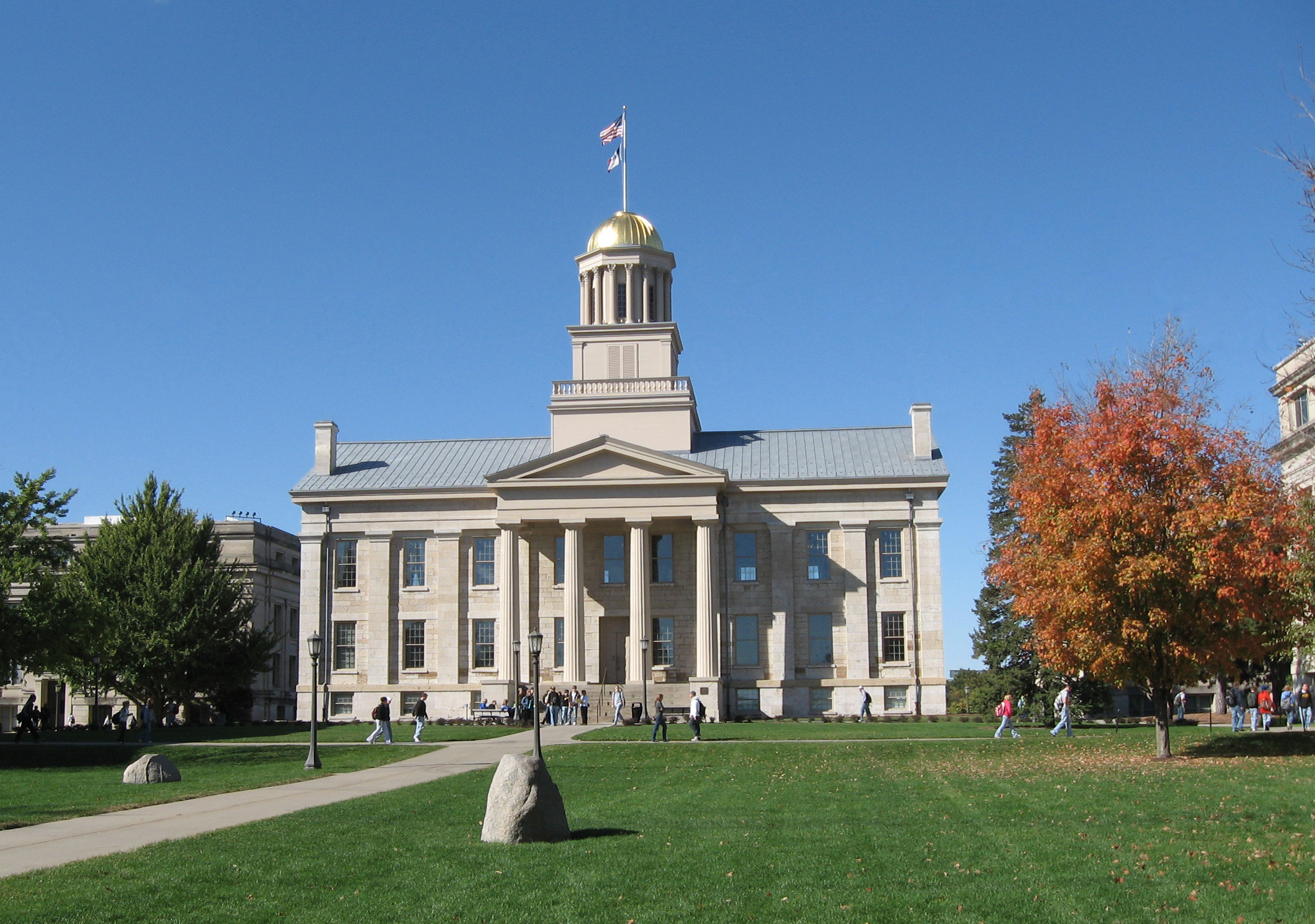
- Old Capitol, center of the Pentacrest

- Location within Iowa Location within the United States
- Location: Bounded by Clinton, Madison, Jefferson, and Washington Sts. Iowa City, IA
- Coordinates: 41°39′41″N 91°32′09″W
- Built: 1842 (Old Capital), 1898
- Architects: John F. Rague (Old Capital), Proudfoot, Bird & Rawson
- Architectural style: Beaux-Arts; Greek Revival
- NRHP reference No.: 78001230
- Added to NRHP: March 29, 1978

The Pentacrest is the Old Capitol and a collection of four buildings on the campus of the University of Iowa that surround the Old Capitol — Jessup Hall, Macbride Hall, MacLean Hall, and Schaeffer Hall — on a four-block-sized parcel of land in Iowa City, Iowa. The Old Capital exhibits the Greek Revival style while the four buildings that surround it display Beaux-Arts architecture.

== Description ==
The Pentacrest is a four-block park-like area including the zero-point of the street grid of Iowa City. The axes are defined by Iowa Avenue and Capitol Street. The exact center is marked by the Iowa Old Capitol Building, which was used as the first state capitol.

The borders of the Pentacrest are Jefferson Street on the north, Washington Street on the south, Madison Street on the west, and Clinton Street on the east.

== History ==
The present configuration is a relatively recent one that was established during the 20th century; beforehand, the site was occupied by other buildings. Calvin Hall once belonged to the Pentacrest, and was located where Macbride Hall currently is. The decision was made that all buildings of the Pentacrest should be the same color; therefore, Calvin Hall was moved intact across Jefferson Street and Macbride Hall was built in its place.

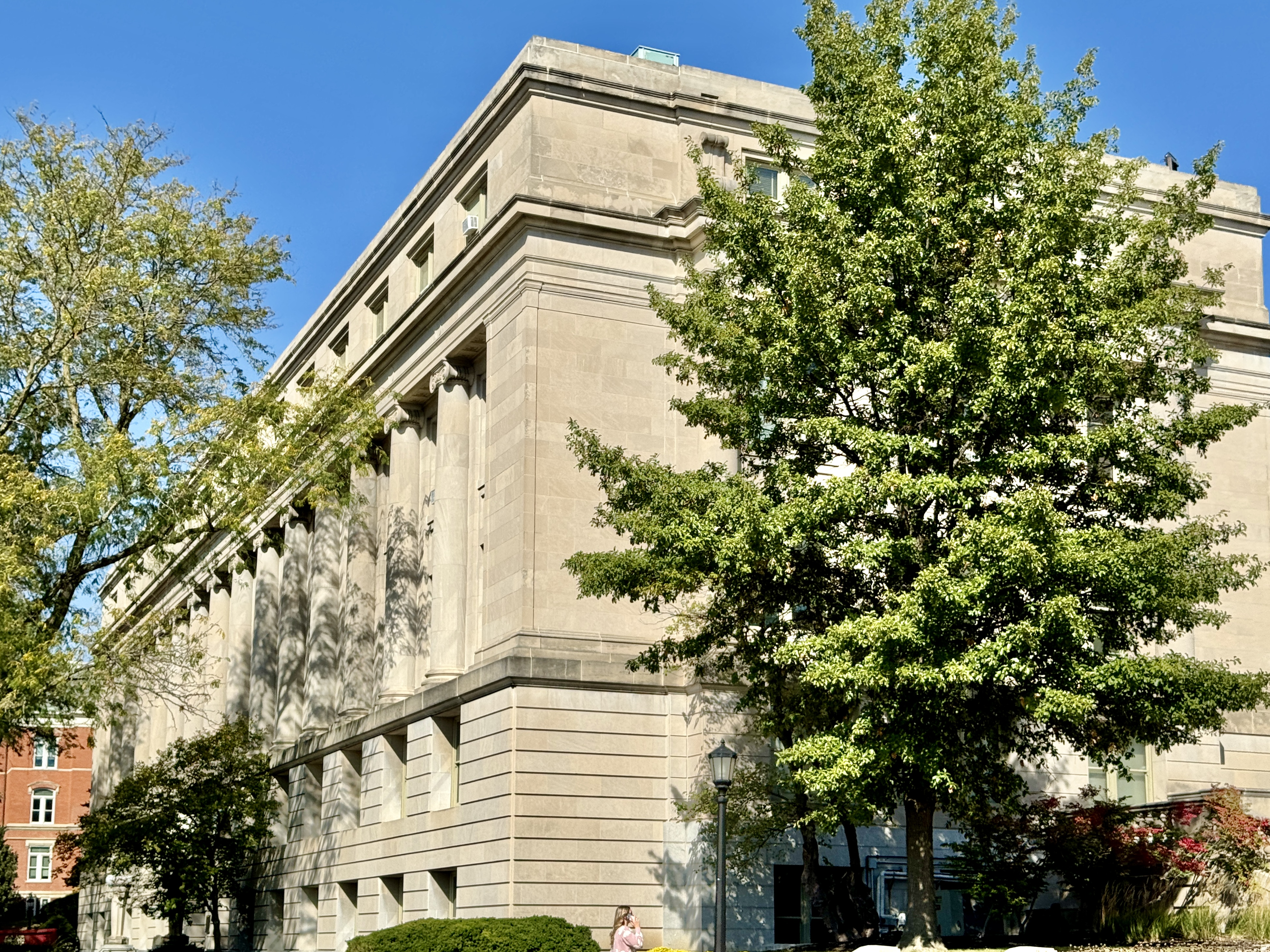
Jessup Hall

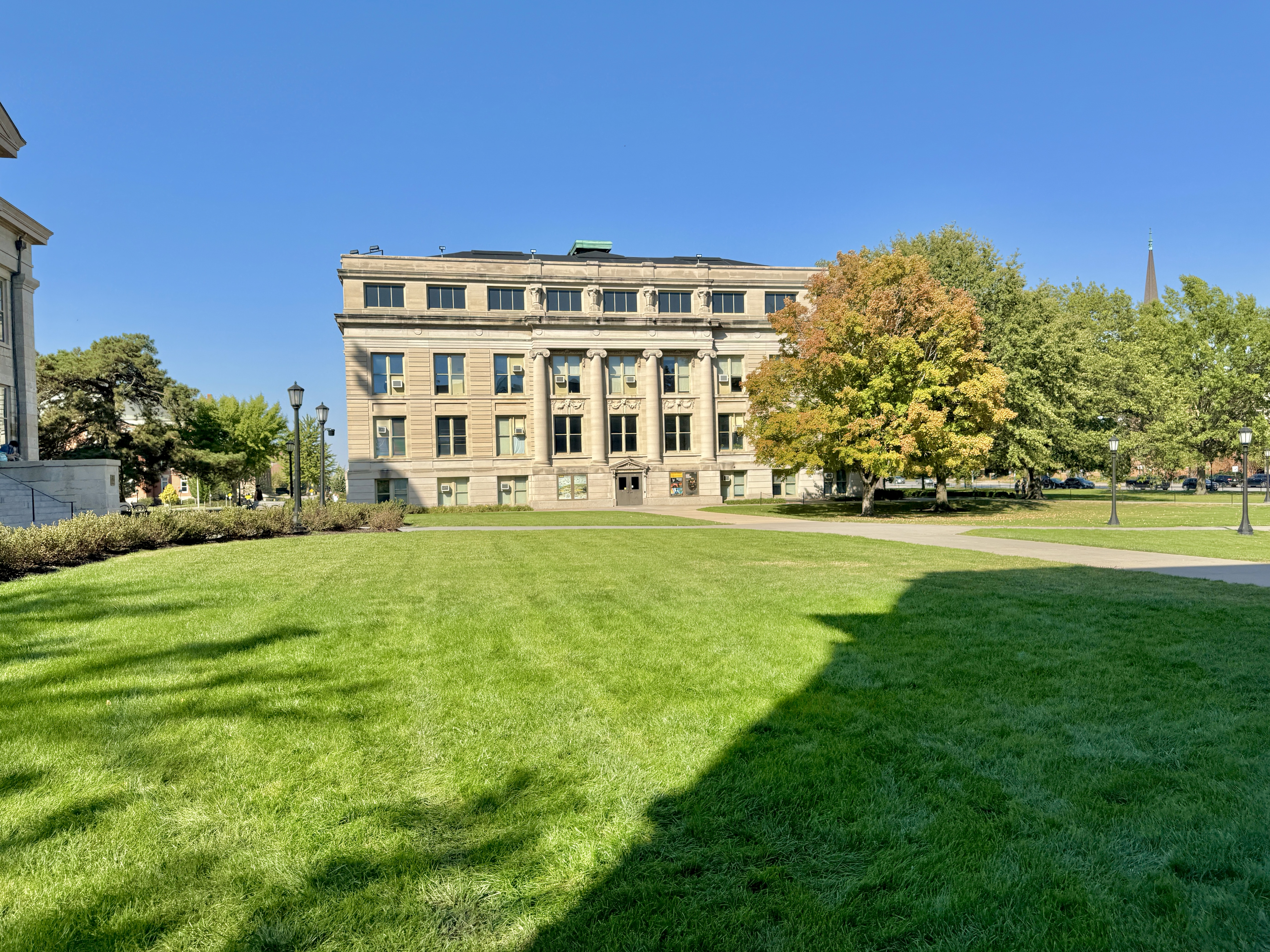
Macbride Hall

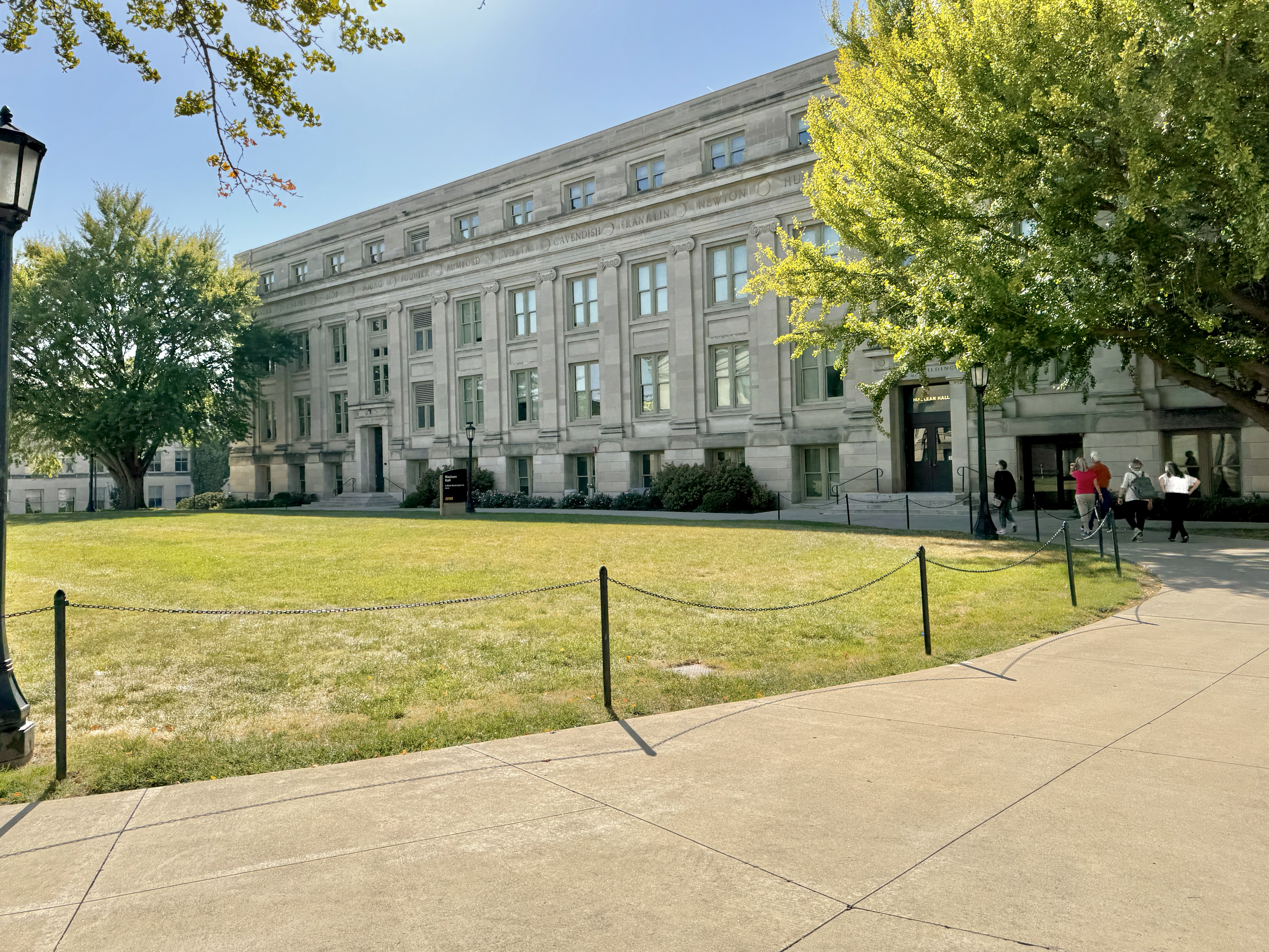
MacLean Hall

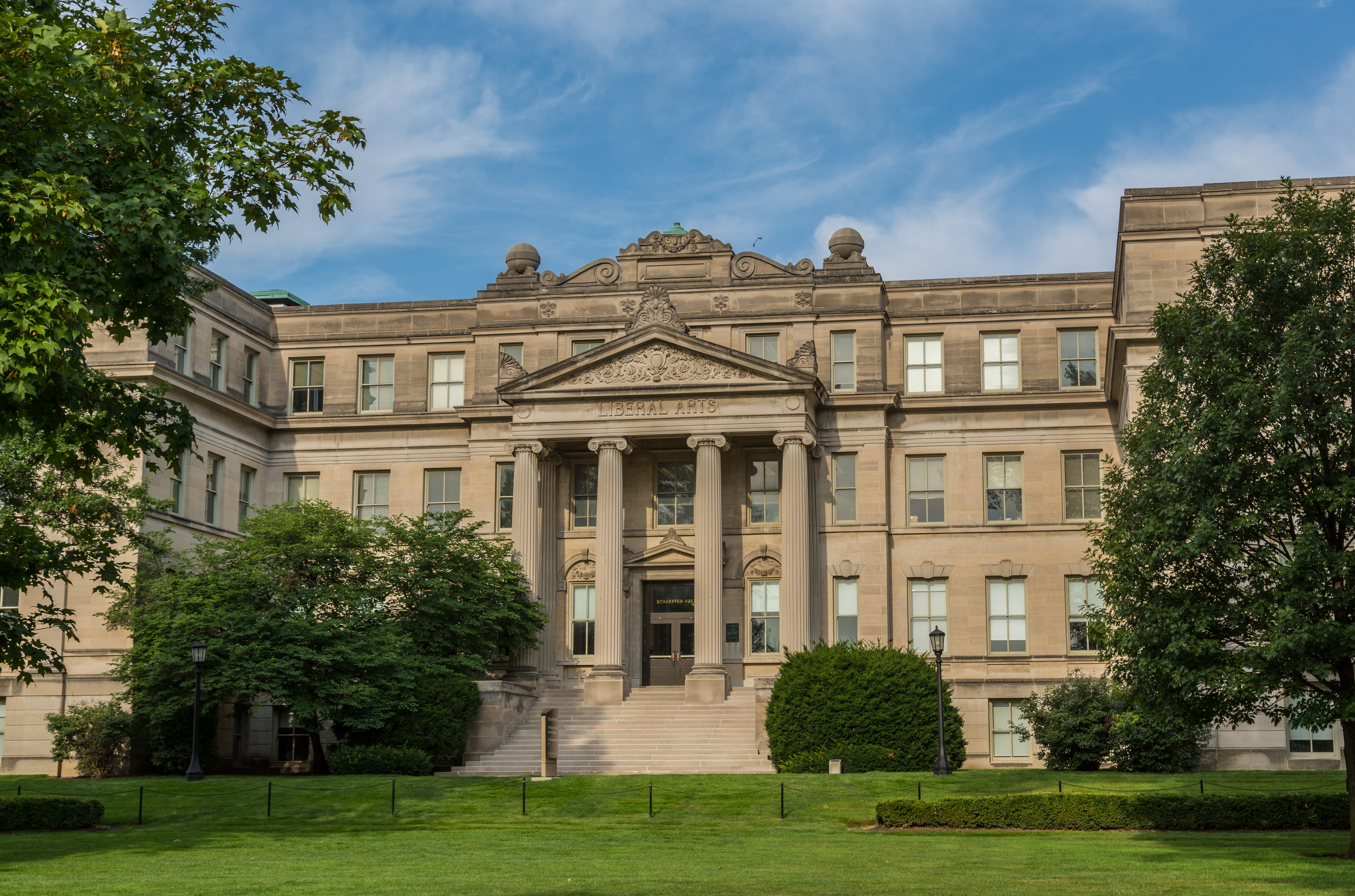
Schaeffer Hall

== See also ==
- National Register of Historic Places listings in Johnson County, Iowa
