= National Register of Historic Places listings in Johnson County, Iowa =

Location of Johnson County in Iowa

Johnson County, Iowa, United States, has 97 properties and districts listed on the National Register of Historic Places, including one National Historic Landmark. Another two properties were formerly listed but have been removed. Latitude and longitude coordinates are provided for many National Register properties and districts; these locations may be seen together in a map.

This National Park Service list is complete through NPS recent listings posted October 16, 2026.

== Current listings ==
	Name on the Register	Image	Date listed	Location	City or town	Description
1	Ned Ashton House	Ned Ashton House	January 26, 2001 (#00001677)	820 Park Rd. 41°40′20″N 91°33′03″W	Iowa City	
2	Charles Berryhill House	Charles Berryhill House	May 31, 1979 (#79000904)	414 Brown St. 41°40′13″N 91°31′46″W	Iowa City	
3	Bethel AME Church	Bethel AME Church	September 27, 2000 (#00000925)	411 S. Governor St. 41°39′22″N 91°31′23″W	Iowa City	
4	Billingsley-Hills House	Billingsley-Hills House	January 21, 1983 (#83000376)	629 Melrose Ave. 41°39′23″N 91°32′54″W	Iowa City	
5	Boerner-Fry Company/Davis Hotel	Boerner-Fry Company/Davis Hotel	January 27, 1983 (#83000377)	332 E. Washington St. 41°39′37″N 91°31′49″W	Iowa City	
6	Albert J. and Alice E. Borts House	Albert J. and Alice E. Borts House	May 8, 2019 (#100003921)	416 Reno St. 41°39′59″N 91°31′07″W	Iowa City	
7	William Bostick House	William Bostick House	March 28, 1996 (#96000312)	115 N. Gilbert St. 41°39′45″N 91°31′50″W	Iowa City	
8	Bowery Street Grocery Store	Bowery Street Grocery Store	April 7, 2014 (#14000112)	518 E. Bowery St. 41°39′15″N 91°31′41″W	Iowa City	
9	Brown Street Historic District	Brown Street Historic District	September 23, 1994 (#94001112)	Roughly Brown St. from west of Linn St. to Governor St. and adjacent parts of intersecting streets • Boundary increase (listed September 29, 2004, refnum 04001096): the 500-800 blocks of E. Ronalds St. 41°40′15″N 91°31′42″W	Iowa City	part of the Iowa City Multiple Property Submission (MPS)
10	Buresh Farm		April 29, 1977 (#77000533)	West of Solon off Iowa Highway 382; 41°48′35″N 91°33′46″W	Solon	
11	Dr. Albert Henry Byfield House	Dr. Albert Henry Byfield House	March 23, 2017 (#100000792)	715 W. Park Rd. 41°40′16″N 91°32′56″W	Iowa City	
12	Wilbur D. and Hattie Cannon House	Wilbur D. and Hattie Cannon House	October 7, 1994 (#94001198)	320 Melrose Ave. 41°39′23″N 91°32′42″W	Iowa City	
13	Thomas C. Carson House	Thomas C. Carson House	September 9, 1982 (#82002623)	906 E. College St. 41°39′33″N 91°31′21″W	Iowa City	
14	Cavanaugh-Zetek House	Cavanaugh-Zetek House	September 16, 1977 (#77000527)	704 Reno St. 41°40′08″N 91°31′05″W	Iowa City	
15	Chicago, Rock Island and Pacific Railroad Passenger Station	Chicago, Rock Island and Pacific Railroad Passenger Station	December 10, 1982 (#82000411)	115 Wright St. 41°39′13″N 91°32′01″W	Iowa City	
16	Clark House	Clark House	May 16, 1996 (#96000545)	829 Kirkwood Ave. 41°38′56″N 91°31′22″W	Iowa City	
17	Close House	Close House	May 31, 1974 (#74000791)	538 S. Gilbert St. 41°39′16″N 91°31′47″W	Iowa City	
18	College Block Building	College Block Building	July 23, 1973 (#73000728)	125 E. College St. 41°39′31″N 91°31′35″W	Iowa City	
19	College Green Historic District	College Green Historic District	July 9, 1997 (#97000623)	Roughly bounded by Burlington, Summit, Washington, and Van Buren Sts. 41°39′32″N 91°31′32″W	Iowa City	part of the Iowa City MPS
20	Congregational Church of Iowa City	Congregational Church of Iowa City	June 18, 1973 (#73000729)	30 N. Clinton St. 41°39′44″N 91°32′02″W	Iowa City	
21	Coralville Public School	Coralville Public School	January 11, 1974 (#74000789)	402-404 5th St. 41°40′26″N 91°34′12″W	Coralville	
22	Coralville Union Ecclesiastical Church	Coralville Union Ecclesiastical Church	April 11, 1977 (#77000526)	405 2nd Ave. 41°40′22″N 91°33′57″W	Coralville	
23	Cottage at Rock and Dubuque Streets	Cottage at Rock and Dubuque Streets	January 3, 1985 (#85000004)	Route 4, Box 3; 41°48′35″N 91°29′40″W	Solon	
24	Czecho Slovakian Association Hall	Czecho Slovakian Association Hall	November 7, 1976 (#76000775)	524 N. Johnson St. 41°40′02″N 91°31′36″W	Iowa City	
25	East College Street Historic District	East College Street Historic District	July 9, 1997 (#97000624)	Roughly bounded by Muscatine Ave., Summitt, Washington, and Burlington Sts. 41°39′28″N 91°31′40″W	Iowa City	part of the Iowa City MPS
26	Economy Advertising Company	Economy Advertising Company	April 28, 1986 (#86000875)	119-123 N. Linn; 41°39′48″N 91°31′53″W	Iowa City	
27	Englert Theatre	Englert Theatre	August 30, 2001 (#01000911)	221 E. Washington St. 41°39′35″N 91°31′56″W	Iowa City	
28	First Johnson County Asylum	First Johnson County Asylum	August 31, 1978 (#78001226)	West of Iowa City; 41°39′22″N 91°36′18″W	Iowa City	
29	First Unitarian Church	First Unitarian Church	October 5, 2018 (#100002996)	10 S Gilbert St. 41°39′40″N 91°31′49″W	Iowa City	
30	First Welsh Congregational Church	First Welsh Congregational Church	April 13, 1977 (#77000528)	5 miles (8.0 km) southwest of Iowa City off Iowa Highway 1; 41°36′47″N 91°36′33″W	Iowa City	
31	Arthur Hillyer Ford House	Arthur Hillyer Ford House	April 10, 1986 (#86000713)	228 Brown St. 41°40′14″N 91°31′48″W	Iowa City	
32	Franklin Printing House	Franklin Printing House	April 10, 1986 (#86000712)	115 S. Dubuque; 41°39′34″N 91°32′00″W	Iowa City	
33	Gilbert-Linn Street Historic District	Gilbert-Linn Street Historic District	April 21, 2005 (#05000366)	Portions of the 300-600 blocks of N. Gilbert and N. Linn Sts. 41°40′00″N 91°31′49″W	Iowa City	part of the Iowa City, Iowa MPS AD
34	Emma J. Harvat and Mary E. Stach House	Emma J. Harvat and Mary E. Stach House	May 11, 2000 (#00000478)	332 E. Davenport St. 41°40′02″N 91°31′49″W	Iowa City	part of the Iowa City MPS
35	Hawthorne Glove and Novelty Company-Shrader Drug Company Building	Hawthorne Glove and Novelty Company-Shrader Drug Company Building	September 22, 2014 (#14000666)	529 S. Gilbert St. 41°39′16″N 91°31′49″W	Iowa City	
36	Henyon-Kasper-Duffy Barn	Henyon-Kasper-Duffy Barn	January 2, 2004 (#03001348)	2520 Iowa Highway 1, NE. 41°44′58″N 91°28′20″W	Solon	
37	Iowa City Community Recreation Center	Iowa City Community Recreation Center	December 5, 2024 (#100011133)	220 S. Gilbert St. 41°39′31″N 91°31′48″W	Iowa City	
38	Iowa City Downtown Historic District	Iowa City Downtown Historic District	May 27, 2021 (#100006609)	South Clinton to South Gilbert Sts., Iowa Ave. to alley south of East College St. 41°39′36″N 91°31′56″W	Iowa City	
39	Iowa City Municipal Airport Terminal		October 14, 2026 (#100013526)	1801 South Riverside Drive; 41°38′24″N 91°32′28″W	Iowa City	
40	Iowa Federation Home for Colored Girls	Iowa Federation Home for Colored Girls	December 6, 2019 (#100004731)	942 Iowa Ave. 41°39′41″N 91°31′16″W	Iowa City	
41	Iowa-Illinois Gas and Electric Company Coralville Power Plant		October 22, 2026 (#100013540)	501 1st Avenue; 41°40′24″N 91°33′56″W	Coralville	
42	Jackson-Swisher House and Carriage House	Jackson-Swisher House and Carriage House	November 10, 1982 (#82000412)	120 E. Fairchild St. 41°40′02″N 91°32′00″W	Iowa City	
43	Jefferson Street Historic District	Jefferson Street Historic District	September 29, 2004 (#04001097)	Portions of the 100-400 blocks of E. Jefferson St. 41°39′46″N 91°31′51″W	Iowa City	part of the Iowa City, Iowa MPS AD
44	Johnson County Courthouse	Johnson County Courthouse	March 27, 1975 (#75000692)	S. Clinton St. 41°39′22″N 91°32′07″W	Iowa City	part of the County Courthouses in Iowa Thematic Resource (TR) (AD)
45	Johnson County Poor Farm and Asylum Historic District	Johnson County Poor Farm and Asylum Historic District	September 22, 2014 (#14000668)	S. side of Melrose & Slothtower Aves. 41°39′26″N 91°36′17″W	Iowa City	
46	Johnson County Savings Bank	Johnson County Savings Bank	September 8, 2017 (#100001580)	102 S. Clinton St. 41°39′36″N 91°32′05″W	Iowa City	
47	Sylvanus Johnson House	Sylvanus Johnson House	December 6, 1990 (#90001857)	2155 Prairie du Chien Rd. 41°41′26″N 91°31′31″W	Iowa City	
48	Kirkwood House	Kirkwood House	September 17, 1974 (#74000792)	1101 Kirkwood; 41°38′57″N 91°31′09″W	Iowa City	
49	Letovsky-Rohret House	Letovsky-Rohret House	April 12, 1982 (#82002624)	515 E. Davenport St. 41°39′55″N 91°31′39″W	Iowa City	
50	Linsay House	Linsay House	August 2, 1977 (#77000529)	935 E. College; 41°39′27″N 91°31′17″W	Iowa City	
51	Longfellow Historic District	Longfellow Historic District	September 12, 2002 (#02001023)	Roughly bounded by Court, Rundell, Sheridan, and the western boundary of Longfellow School; 41°39′16″N 91°30′59″W	Iowa City	part of the Iowa City, Iowa MPS AD
52	James McCollister Farmstead	James McCollister Farmstead	October 8, 1976 (#76000776)	Southeast of the junction of U.S. Routes 6 and 218; 41°38′03″N 91°31′45″W	Iowa City	
53	Melrose Historic District	Melrose Historic District	December 6, 2004 (#04001321)	Portions of Melrose Ave., Melrose Ct., Melrose Circle, Brookland Park Dr., Brookland Place, and Myrtle Ave. 41°39′21″N 91°32′45″W	Iowa City	part of the Iowa City, Iowa MPS AD
54	Miller Round Barn	Miller Round Barn	June 30, 1986 (#86001445)	County Road F62; 41°33′38″N 91°37′52″W	Sharon Center	part of the Iowa Round Barns: The Sixty Year Experiment TR
55	Muscatine Avenue Moffitt Cottage Historic District	Muscatine Avenue Moffitt Cottage Historic District	May 4, 1993 (#93000327)	1322-1330 Muscatine Ave. 41°39′26″N 91°30′55″W	Iowa City	part of the Small Homes of Howard F. Moffitt in Iowa City and Coralville MPS
56	Nicking House	Nicking House	April 21, 1975 (#75000693)	410 E. Market St. 41°39′49″N 91°31′45″W	Iowa City	
57	North Presbyterian Church	North Presbyterian Church	August 28, 1973 (#73000730)	26 E. Market St. 41°39′50″N 91°32′04″W	Iowa City	
58	Oakes-Wood House	Oakes-Wood House	April 14, 1978 (#78001227)	1142 E. Court St. 41°39′25″N 91°31′05″W	Iowa City	
59	Old Capitol	Old Capitol	May 31, 1972 (#72000475)	University of Iowa campus 41°39′41″N 91°32′08″W	Iowa City	
60	Old Post Office	Old Post Office	April 17, 1979 (#79000905)	28 S. Linn St. 41°39′38″N 91°31′52″W	Iowa City	
61	Old Settlers' Association of Johnson County Cabins	Old Settlers' Association of Johnson County Cabins	June 25, 2013 (#13000429)	Upper City Park Rd. off 100 blk. Park Rd. 41°40′16″N 91°32′32″W	Iowa City	
62	Old State Quarry	Old State Quarry	February 23, 1998 (#97001676)	0.1 miles (0.16 km) south of the southern end of Rice Ridge Ln., NE., at Coralville Lake; 41°45′48″N 91°34′13″W	North Liberty	
63	Oxford Commercial Historic District	Oxford Commercial Historic District	May 2, 1997 (#97000389)	Roughly Augusta Ave. between Wilson St. and the Center St. alley 41°43′26″N 91°47′25″W	Oxford	
64	Park House Hotel	Park House Hotel	December 11, 1978 (#78001229)	130 E. Jefferson St. 41°39′46″N 91°32′00″W	Iowa City	
65	Paul–Helen Building	Paul–Helen Building	April 10, 1986 (#86000708)	207-215 E. Washington; 41°39′35″N 91°31′57″W	Iowa City	
66	Pentacrest	Pentacrest	March 29, 1978 (#78001230)	Bounded by Clinton, Madison, Jefferson, and Washington Sts. 41°39′41″N 91°32′09″W	Iowa City	
67	Plum Grove	Plum Grove	May 7, 1973 (#73000731)	1030 Carroll Ave. 41°38′52″N 91°31′28″W	Iowa City	
68	Polygonal Barn, Lincoln Township		June 30, 1986 (#86001452)	Off U.S. Route 6; 41°35′16″N 91°23′41″W	Lincoln Township	part of the Iowa Round Barns: The Sixty Year Experiment TR
69	A.W. Pratt House	A.W. Pratt House	February 3, 1983 (#83000378)	503 Melrose Ave. 41°39′23″N 91°32′45″W	Iowa City	
70	Samuel and Emma A. Ranshaw House	Samuel and Emma A. Ranshaw House	September 26, 2012 (#12000814)	515 W. Penn St. 41°45′05″N 91°36′21″W	North Liberty	
71	F.X. Rittenmeyer House	F.X. Rittenmeyer House	May 31, 1979 (#79000906)	630 E. Fairchild St. 41°40′01″N 91°31′32″W	Iowa City	
72	Roberts Octagon Barn	Roberts Octagon Barn	June 30, 1986 (#86001449)	County Road W62; 41°35′24″N 91°38′07″W	Sharon Center	part of the Iowa Round Barns: The Sixty Year Experiment TR
73	Rose Hill	Rose Hill	April 28, 1992 (#92000425)	1415 E. Davenport St. 41°39′57″N 91°31′01″W	Iowa City	
74	St. John's Lutheran Church	St. John's Lutheran Church	April 5, 1977 (#77000532)	North of Kalona; 41°33′15″N 91°40′03″W	Kalona	
75	St. Mary's Church and Rectory	St. Mary's Church and Rectory	February 8, 1980 (#80001454)	220 E. Jefferson St. 41°39′46″N 91°31′54″W	Iowa City	
76	St. Mary's Rectory	St. Mary's Rectory	July 7, 1995 (#95000811)	610 E. Jefferson St. 41°39′48″N 91°31′54″W	Iowa City	
77	Saints Peter and Paul Catholic Church	Saints Peter and Paul Catholic Church	July 9, 1997 (#97000622)	1165 NE. Taft Ave. 41°50′57″N 91°27′49″W	Solon	
78	Schindhelm-Drews House	Schindhelm-Drews House	January 28, 1994 (#93001589)	410 N. Lucas St. 41°39′58″N 91°31′27″W	Iowa City	
79	Secrest Octagon Barn	Secrest Octagon Barn	November 5, 1974 (#74000790)	West of Downey; 41°36′49″N 91°22′13″W	Downey	part of the Iowa Round Barns: The Sixty Year Experiment TR
80	Bohumil Shimek House	Bohumil Shimek House	December 23, 1991 (#91001837)	529 Brown St. 41°40′11″N 91°31′37″W	Iowa City	part of the Conservation Movement in Iowa MPS
81	Sigma Pi Fraternity House	Sigma Pi Fraternity House	December 31, 2013 (#13001019)	108 McLean St. 41°40′10″N 91°32′30″W	Iowa City	
82	South Summit Street District	South Summit Street District	October 9, 1973 (#73000732)	301-818 S. Summit St. 41°39′16″N 91°31′16″W	Iowa City	
83	Stone Academy	Stone Academy	January 16, 2001 (#00001653)	Iowa Highway 1, 2 miles (3.2 km) north of Solon; 41°50′20″N 91°30′05″W	Solon	
84	Summit Apartment Building	Summit Apartment Building	September 29, 1983 (#83004188)	228 S. Summit St. 41°39′29″N 91°31′14″W	Iowa City	
85	Sutliff Bridge	Sutliff Bridge	May 15, 1998 (#98000520)	Sutliff Rd. over the Cedar River; 41°50′23″N 91°23′33″W	Sutliff	part of the Highway Bridges of Iowa MPS
86	Tate Arms	Tate Arms	December 9, 2019 (#100004732)	914 S. Dubuque St. 41°39′02″N 91°31′58″W	Iowa City	
87	Trinity Episcopal Church	Trinity Episcopal Church	December 31, 1974 (#74000793)	320 E. College St. 41°39′33″N 91°31′49″W	Iowa City	
88	Union Bakery	Union Bakery	December 15, 2015 (#15000893)	203 N. Linn St. 41°39′50″N 91°31′55″W	Iowa City	
89	Union Brewery	Union Brewery	April 10, 1986 (#86000710)	127-131 N. Linn St. and 221-227 E. Market St. 41°39′48″N 91°31′54″W	Iowa City	
90	Vogt House	Vogt House	July 24, 1978 (#78001231)	800 N. Van Buren St. 41°40′15″N 91°31′42″W	Iowa City	
91	Washington Township Center High School	Washington Township Center High School	December 15, 1979 (#79000903)	Northeast of Amish; 41°33′20″N 91°46′12″W	Washington Township	
92	Roland and Marilyn Wehner House	Roland and Marilyn Wehner House	September 9, 2013 (#13000691)	3112 Iowa Highway 1; 41°42′29″N 91°28′58″W	Iowa City vicinity	
93	Jacob Wentz House	Jacob Wentz House	August 27, 1974 (#74000794)	219 N. Gilbert St. 41°39′51″N 91°31′48″W	Iowa City	
94	Isaac A. Wetherby House	Isaac A. Wetherby House	March 17, 2009 (#09000127)	611 North Governor Street; 41°40′05″N 91°31′23″W	Iowa City	Former home of Isaac Augustus Wetherby.
95	H.A. White General Store and House	H.A. White General Store and House	January 12, 1984 (#84001265)	10 W. Cherry St. 41°45′33″N 91°35′52″W	North Liberty	
96	Windrem House	Windrem House	September 13, 1977 (#77000531)	604 Iowa Ave. 41°39′41″N 91°31′36″W	Iowa City	
97	Woodlawn Historic District	Woodlawn Historic District	March 26, 1979 (#79000907)	Irregular pattern along Woodlawn Ave. 41°39′40″N 91°31′10″W	Iowa City	

== Former listings ==
	Name on the Register	Image	Date listed	Date removed	Location	City or town	Description
1	Opera House Block		November 29, 1978 (#78001228)	October 11, 2006	210–212 South Clinton Street; 41°39′40″N 91°31′10″W	Iowa City	
2	M. T. Close and Company Flaxseed Warehouse		July 12, 1984 (#84001262)	August 15, 1995	521 S. Gilbert St. 41°39′40″N 91°31′10″W	Iowa City	
3	St. Mary's High School		December 19, 1977 (#77000530)	November 12, 1997	104 E. Jefferson St.	Iowa City	Demolished in 1990
4	Benjamin F. Shambaugh and Bertha M. Horack House		August 16, 1996 (#96000895)	March 18, 2004	219 N. Clinton Street; 41°40′00″N 91°32′03″W	Iowa City	The house was moved to a new location on January 8, 2002.
5	Van Patten House	Van Patten House	January 27, 1983 (#83000379)	March 7, 2016	9 S. Linn St. 41°39′38″N 91°30′57″W	Iowa City	Demolished in January 2012 following a fire started at a nearby business.

== See also ==
- List of National Historic Landmarks in Iowa
- National Register of Historic Places listings in Iowa
- Listings in neighboring counties: Benton, Cedar, Iowa, Linn, Louisa, Muscatine, Washington
