= Union Brewery =

Union Brewery may refer to:

- Union Brewery (Adelaide), an early establishment in South Australia
- Union Brewery (Iowa), a historic brewery building in Iowa City, Iowa, United States
- Union Brewery (Slovenia), one of the largest breweries in Slovenia
- Dortmund U-Tower, a former brewery building in Dortmund, Germany
- Yakel House and Union Brewery, a historic house and brewery complex in Alton, Illinois, United States
