= Elizabeth Tate (disambiguation) =

Elizabeth Tate was a civil rights activist.

Elizabeth Tate may also refer to:

- Elizabeth Tate (The Other Sister)
- Elizabeth Tate High School, see List of high schools in Iowa
- Elizabeth Tate, character, see List of Quantum Leap episodes
- Lizzie Tate or USS Victory (1863)

== See also ==
- Betty Tate (disambiguation)
- Elizabeth Tait (disambiguation)
