= Betty Tate =

Betty Tate may refer to:

- Betty Tate-Hughes, character in Atlantic (film)
- Betty Tate, songwriter, see Delta Dawn (album)

== See also ==
- Elizabeth Tate (disambiguation)
