= Elizabeth Tait =

Elizabeth Tait may refer to:

- Elizabeth Tait, appeared in the 1906 film The Story of the Kelly Gang
- Elizabeth Tait (Holby City)

== See also ==
- Elizabeth Tate (disambiguation)
