= Isaac A. Wetherby House =

Historic house in Iowa, United States

- U.S. National Register of Historic Places
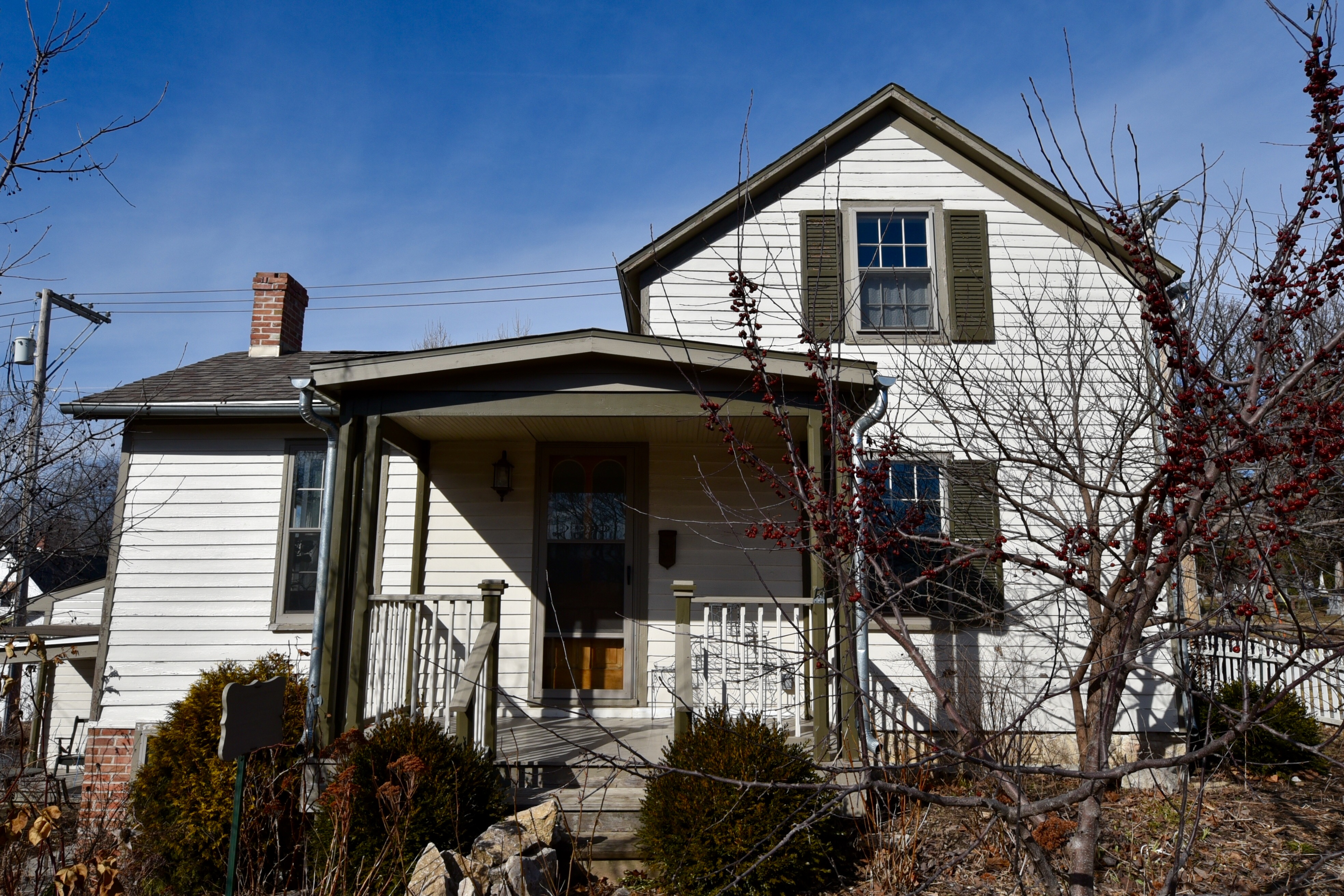

- Location within Iowa Location within the United States
- Location: 611 N. Governor St. Iowa City, Iowa
- Coordinates: 41°40′06″N 91°31′22.9″W
- Area: less than one acre
- Built: 1854, 1860
- Built by: Patrick Doyle; Isaac Augustus Wetherby
- NRHP reference No.: 09000127
- Added to NRHP: March 17, 2009

The Isaac A. Wetherby House is a historic building located in Iowa City, Iowa, United States. This house was built in two parts. The original two-story frame section was built in 1854 by Patrick Doyle, an Irish immigrant and teamster. A single-story frame addition was built by portrait painter and photographer Isaac Augustus Wetherby in 1860. He had acquired the house from Doyle, who could no longer afford the taxes. Wetherby lived here until 1887 when he sought economic opportunities elsewhere but probably visited from time to time until his death in 1904. His family continued to reside here until 1948. The house was originally located on Market Street and was moved to this location on Governor in 2008 when a developer threatened to tear it down. It is the only extant building associated with Isaac Wetherby. The house was listed on the National Register of Historic Places in 2009.
