= Polygonal Barn, Lincoln Township =

- U.S. National Register of Historic Places

- Location within Iowa Location within the United States
- Location: Off U.S. Route 6 West Liberty, Iowa
- Coordinates: 41°35′16″N 91°23′41″W
- Area: less than one acre
- Built: 1880
- Built by: George Frank Longerbean
- MPS: Iowa Round Barns: The Sixty Year Experiment TR
- NRHP reference No.: 86001452
- Added to NRHP: June 30, 1986

The Polygonal Barn, Lincoln Township was a historic building located in Lincoln Township in rural Johnson County, Iowa, United States. It was built in 1880 by George Frank Longerbean. The barn was an 8-sided structure and has subsequently been torn down. It featured a bell shaped roof of curving hand-laminated beams. The building was listed on the National Register of Historic Places in 1986.
