= Oxford Commercial Historic District =

Historic district in Iowa, United States

- U.S. National Register of Historic Places
- U.S. Historic district
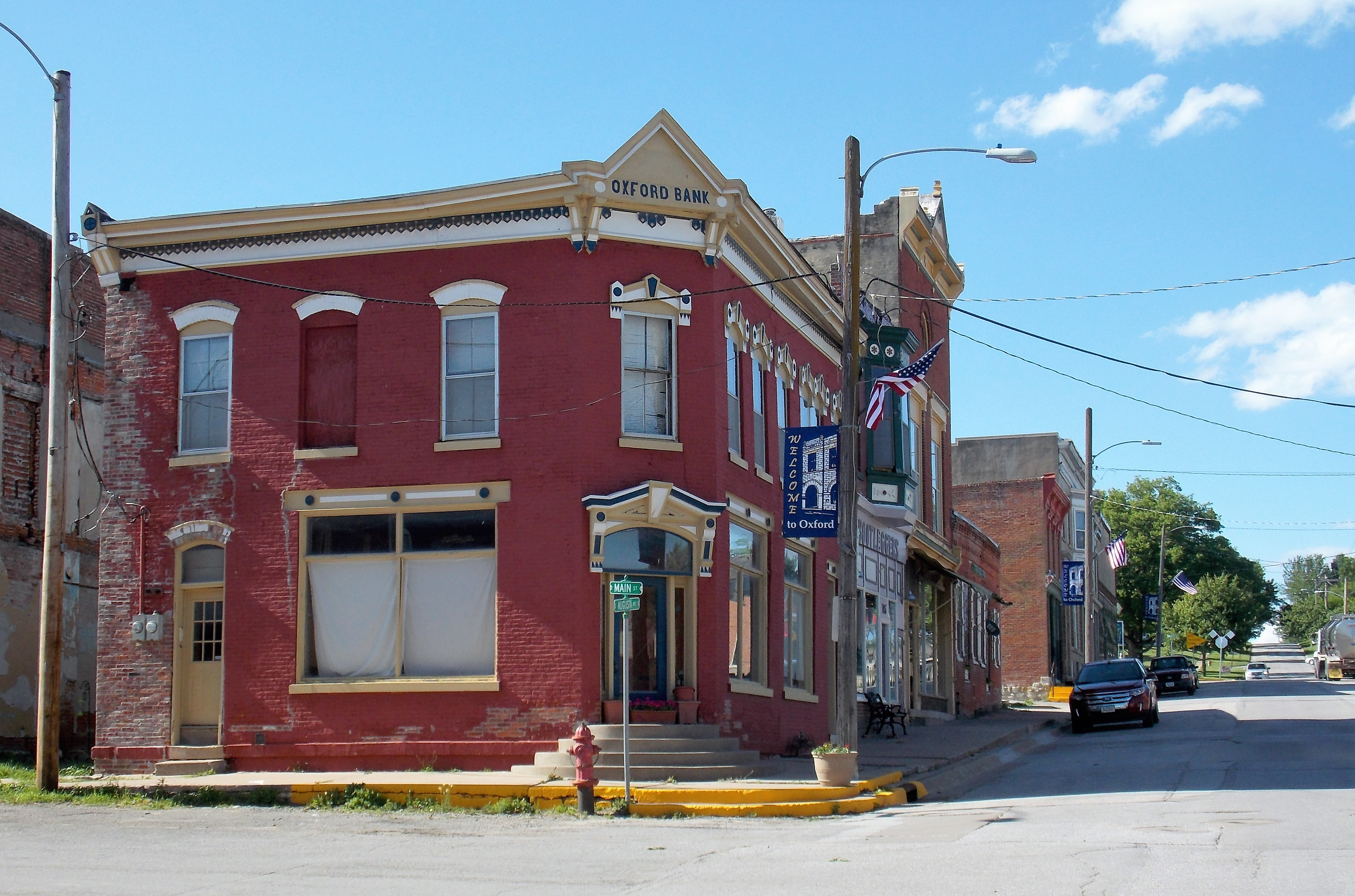
- Buildings in Downtown Oxford on North Augusta Avenue

- Location within Iowa Location within the United States
- Location: Roughly Augusta Ave. between Wilson St. and the Center St. alley, Oxford, Iowa
- Coordinates: 41°43′26″N 91°47′25″W
- Area: 1.5 acres (0.61 ha)
- Built by: Henry C. Seevogel
- Architectural style: Italianate; Romanesque
- NRHP reference No.: 97000389
- Added to NRHP: May 2, 1997

The Oxford Commercial Historic District is a nationally recognized historic district located in Oxford, Iowa, United States. It was listed on the National Register of Historic Places in 1997. At the time of its nomination it consisted of 20 resources, which included 16 contributing buildings and four non-contributing buildings. This district reflects a typical central business district found in a Midwest town. It represents a transitional period from a frontier town to a settled community, and from the horse as the primary means of transportation to the automobile and mechanized farming. Most of the buildings in Oxford's business district were constructed between 1883 and 1917. Some replaced the wood-frame structures from the town's frontier days, while others replaced those destroyed by a major fire that consumed the north side of the district in 1890. They are one to two stories in height, and their exteriors are composed of common brick. While simple in composition, many feature ornate decorative cornices. The Italianate and Romanesque Revival styles dominate.

Oxford began informally in the 1850s by workers who serviced the engines on the Mississippi and Missouri Railroad, which was replaced by the Chicago, Rock Island and Pacific. The town itself was platted in 1868, and it experienced significant growth in the 1870s. Four additions were added to the town in that decade alone.
