= H.A. White General Store and House =

Historic house in Iowa, United States

- U.S. National Register of Historic Places
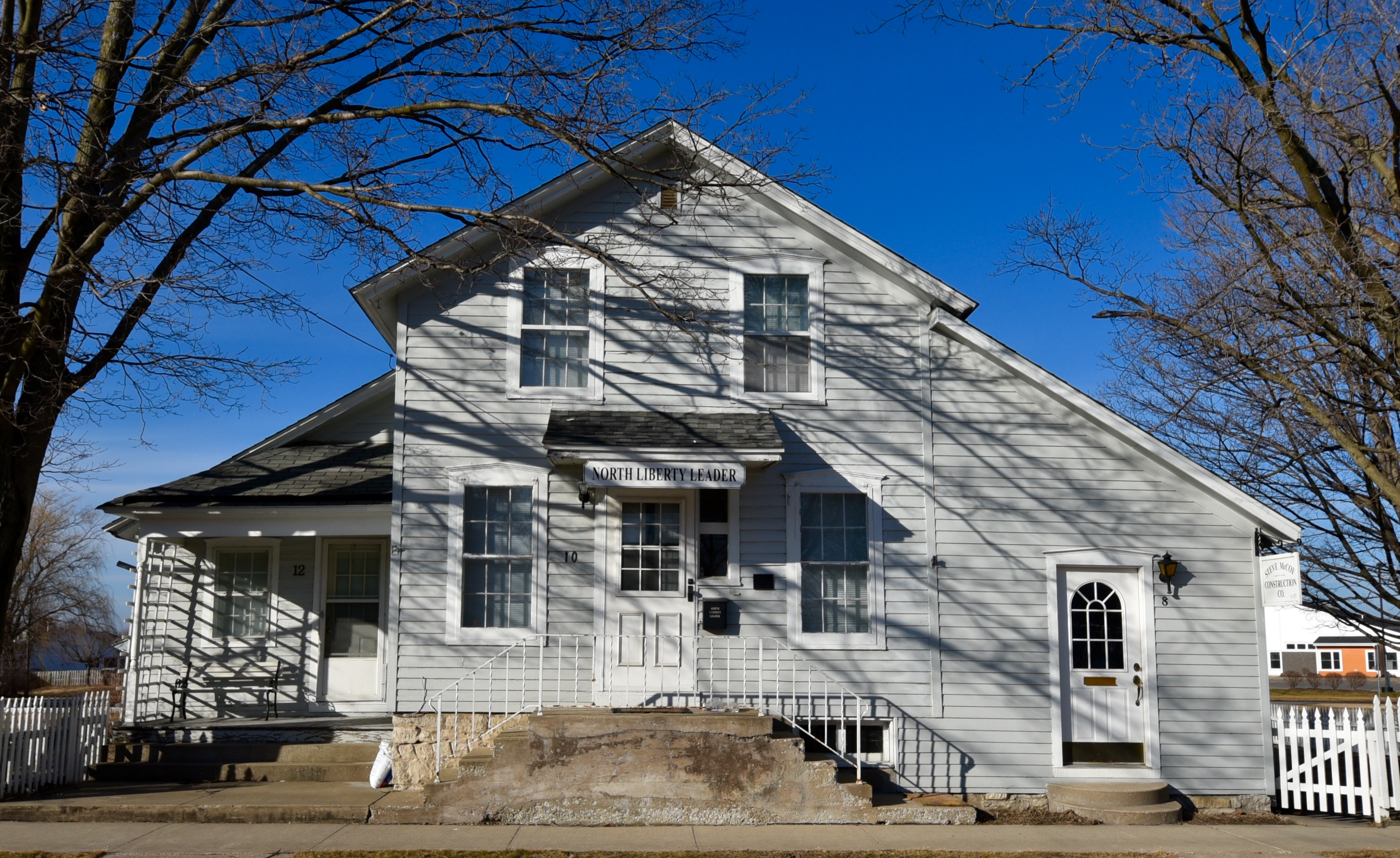
- The general store property in North Liberty in February 2016

- Location within Iowa Location within the United States
- Location: 10 W. Cherry St. North Liberty, Iowa
- Coordinates: 41°44′55.3″N 91°35′53.9″W
- Area: less than one acre
- Built: 1876
- Built by: H.A. White
- NRHP reference No.: 84001265
- Added to NRHP: January 12, 1984

H.A. White General Store and House is a historic building located in North Liberty, Iowa, United States. The central portion of the two-story frame building was completed in 1876. At least three additions were built onto the original in subsequent years. It housed the commercial businesses and residence of H.A. White and his family. It was the only commercial enterprise in North Liberty between 1876 and 1889. White served as the local postmaster from 1877 through 1888, and the building housed the post office in those years. Dr. James Polk Von Stein boarded here c. 1879 to 1891 and had his office here as well. After 1903 the building was used only as a residence, and became a rental property by the 1980s. It was listed on the National Register of Historic Places in 1984. The building is presently used once again for commercial purposes.
