= Economy Advertising Company =

- U.S. National Register of Historic Places
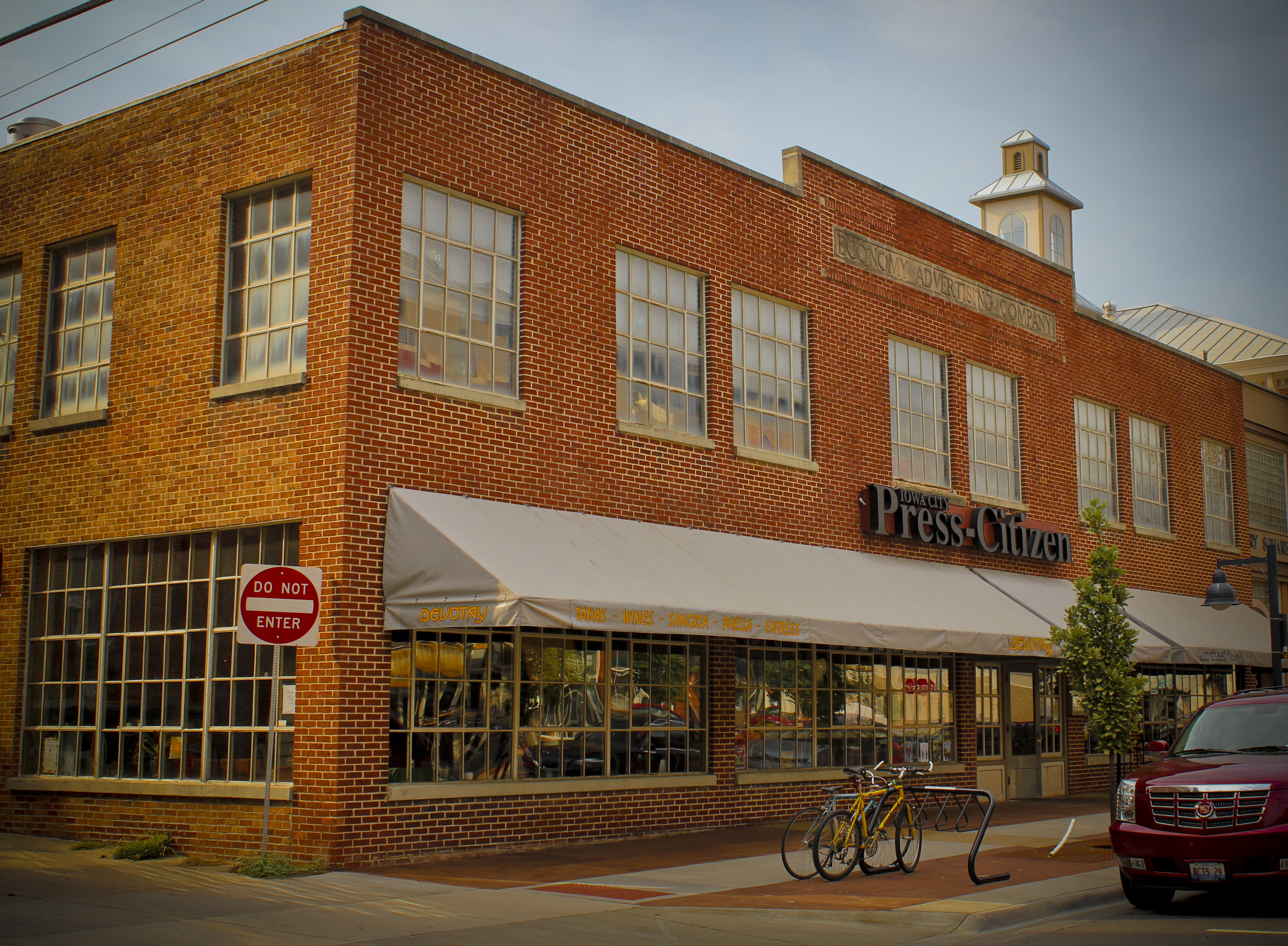

- Location within Iowa Location within the United States
- Location: 119-123 N. Linn St. Iowa City, Iowa
- Coordinates: 41°39′47.5″N 91°31′55.2″W
- Area: less than one acre
- Built: 1923
- Built by: David Willis Bywater
- NRHP reference No.: 86000875
- Added to NRHP: April 28, 1985

Economy Advertising Company is a historic building located in Iowa City, Iowa, United States. It is important due to its association with John Towner Frederick, and the journal he founded and edited, The Midland. This was a literary magazine that focused on regional literature from the Midwest. It featured writers whose work was not being accepted by literary journals in the eastern U.S. that dominated national literary circles. While The Midland had several offices during its run from 1915 to 1934, Economy Advertising Company typeset, printed and bound every edition of the journal. They also provided financial support. Frederick had worked here as an apprentice when he was a student at the University of Iowa. He went on to become the first educator to organize and teach a course in American literature when he taught at the University of Iowa. Together with Frank Luther Mott, who was sometimes a co-editor of the journal, he organized the Saturday Luncheon Club, a literary forum that was a forerunner of the Iowa Writer's Workshop. When Frederick took a position at Northwestern University, the magazine relocated to Chicago. The Midland was never financially self-sufficient, and Frederick took on its deficits himself. Financial factors finally doomed it in 1933.

Economy Advertising was founded around 1896 by Samuel W. Mercer. He had this two-story brick building constructed in 1923. In addition to The Midland, Economy published hard back books under the "Clio Press" imprint, and for several years printed the State Historical Society of Iowa's journal, The Palimpsest. They also published literary works edited by Mott that included Grant Wood's Revolt Against the City. The building was listed on the National Register of Historic Places in 1986.
