= St. John's Lutheran Church (Kalona, Iowa) =

- U.S. National Register of Historic Places
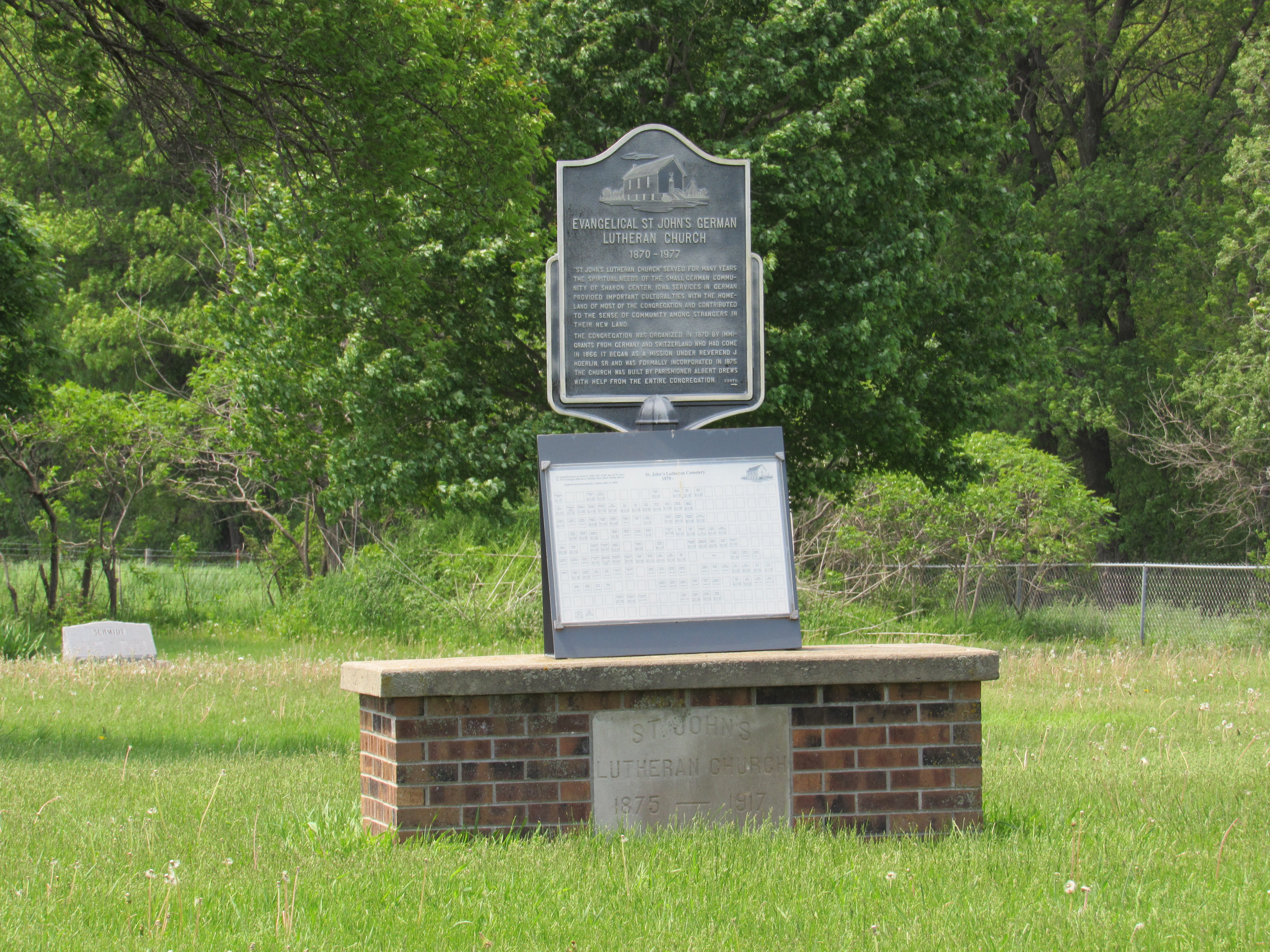
- Marker at the church's former location

- Location within Iowa Location within the United States
- Location: North of Kalona
- Coordinates: 41°33′15″N 91°40′05″W
- Area: 1 acre (0.40 ha)
- Built: 1875
- Built by: Albert Drews
- NRHP reference No.: 77000532
- Added to NRHP: April 13, 1977

St. John's Lutheran Church, also known as Evangelical St. John's German Lutheran Church, was a complex of historic buildings located north of Kalona, Iowa, United States. This Lutheran congregation was organized in 1870 by German immigrants who settled in southern Johnson County in the 1860s. It began as a mission under the direction of the Rev. J. Hoerlin, Sr., and it was formally incorporated in 1875. The simple frame church building was completed that same year. It rested on a concrete block foundation, from 1917, and featured three round-arch windows on the side walls and a fanlight over the main entrance. When the Rev. H. Hertle came as the first resident pastor in 1878 a two-story frame parsonage was built next to the church. Behind the church and parsonage sat an outhouse and a catechetical room that was used for children's religious instruction. Services in English were begun in 1905 because the younger members no longer spoke German.

From the turn of the 20th century until 1955 the congregation slowly declined in numbers. From 1955 to 1958 a minister from Iowa City conducted services here. After that time only occasional services for funerals or family reunions were held. By the time the buildings were listed on the National Register of Historic Places in 1977, they were in poor condition. They have all subsequently been torn down. A small cemetery remains in the church grounds.
