= South Summit Street District =

Historic district in Iowa, United States

- U.S. National Register of Historic Places
- U.S. Historic district
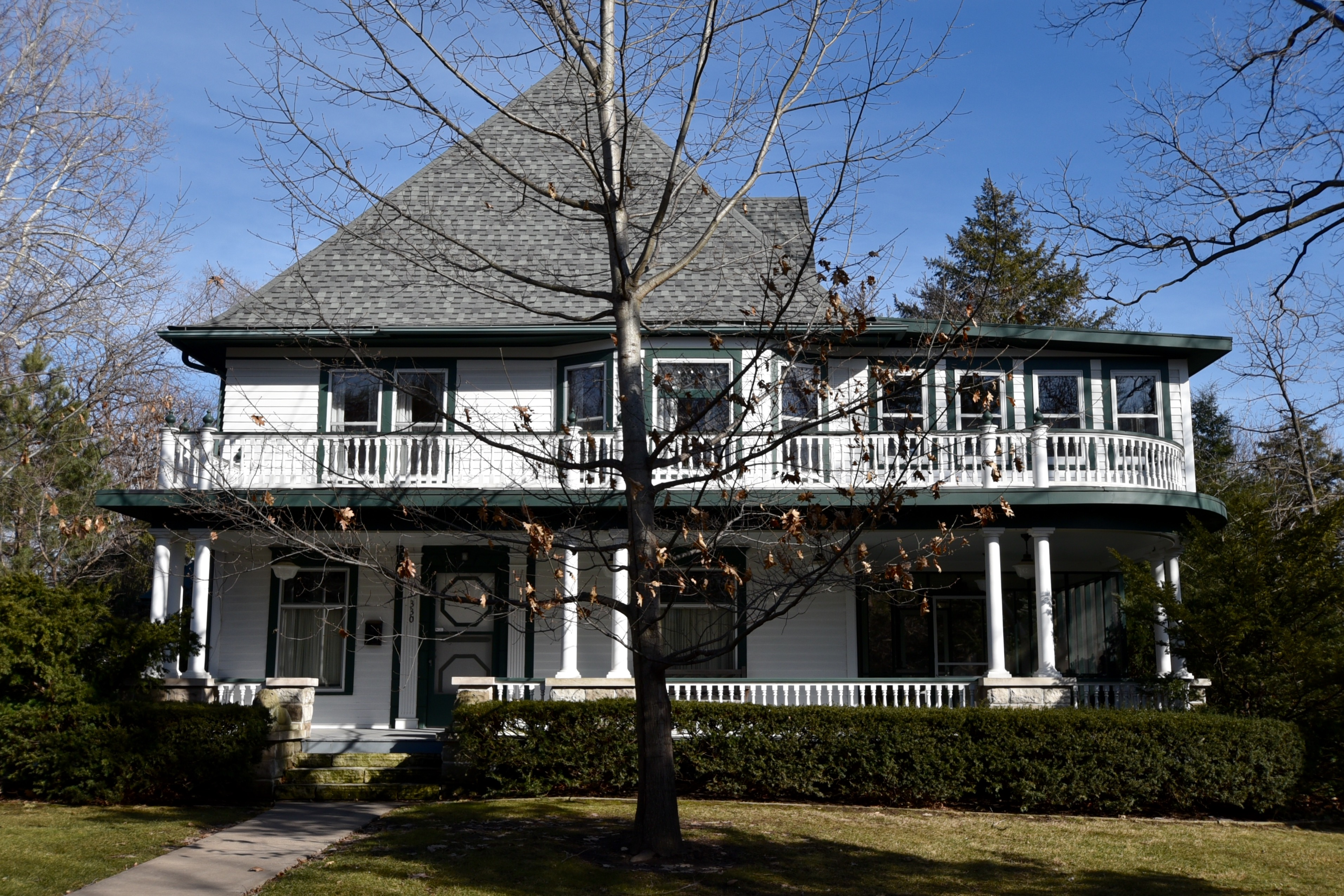
- 330 South Summit Street

- Location within Iowa Location within the United States
- Location: 301-818 S. Summit St. Iowa City, Iowa
- Coordinates: 41°39′16″N 91°31′16″W
- Area: 29 acres (12 ha)
- Architectural style: Folk Victorian; Queen Anne; Stick Style; Tudor Revival; Colonial Revival
- NRHP reference No.: 73000732
- Added to NRHP: October 9, 1973

The South Summit Street District is a nationally recognized historic district located in Iowa City, Iowa, United States. It was listed on the National Register of Historic Places in 1973. At the time of its nomination it consisted of 50 contributing buildings, most of which were built between 1860 and 1910. The west side of the 300 block formed part of Iowa City's original boundary. A 6-foot (1.8 m) limestone obelisk at 331 South Summit marks the original southeast corner of the city. Although nothing is left of it, Camp Pope, a training camp for the Union Army during the American Civil War, was located in this area in 1862. Three Iowa Infantry regiments, the 22nd, 28th and 40th, trained here. The street itself was created in the 1850s and the 1860s, and it was incorporated into the city in 1881. The neighborhood is a park-like setting with mature trees and large homes that sit back from the street. A large variety of architectural styles are represented in the neighborhood.
