= Dr. Albert Henry Byfield House =

Historic house in Iowa, United States

- U.S. National Register of Historic Places
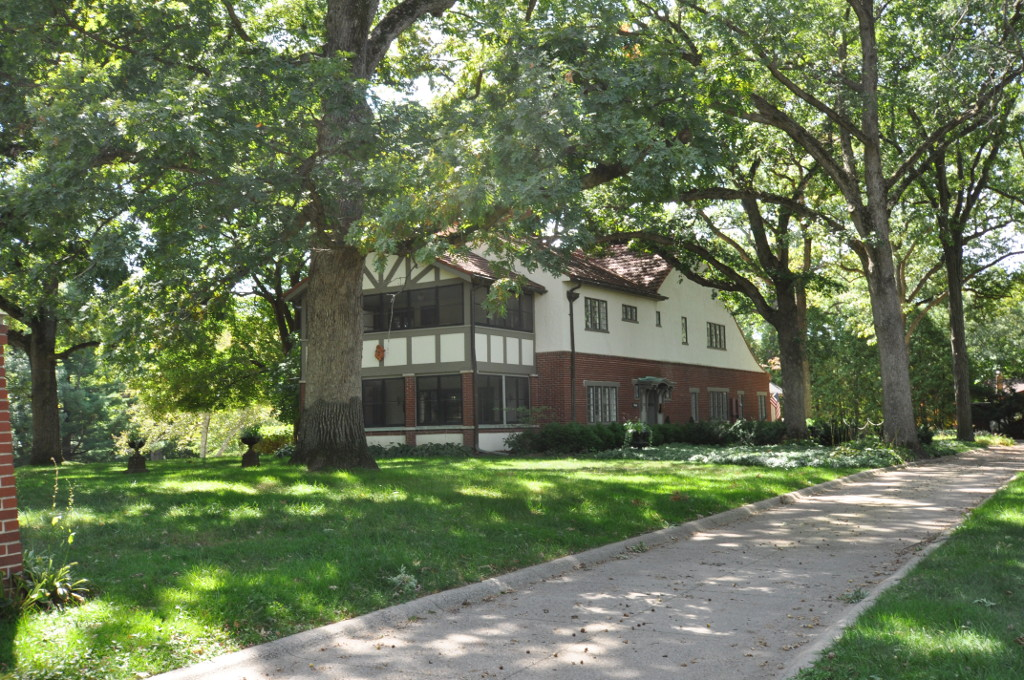

- Location within Iowa Location within the United States
- Location: 715 W. Park Rd. Iowa City, Iowa
- Coordinates: 41°40′15.5″N 91°32′56″W
- Area: less than one acre
- Built: 1917
- Architect: Stuart Hobbs Sims
- Architectural style: Tudor Revival; Craftsman
- NRHP reference No.: 100000792
- Added to NRHP: March 23, 2017

The Dr. Albert Henry Byfield House is a historic building located in Iowa City, Iowa, United States. Completed in 1917, the two-story house combines elements of the Tudor Revival and the Craftsman styles. It was designed by Stuart Hobbs Sims, an engineering professor at the University of Iowa. It features asymmetrical facades, a two-story porch on the east elevation, and a tile roof with a cat-slide gable. The first owner of the house, Dr. Byfield, founded the Pediatrics Department at the University of Iowa College of Medicine. The house was listed on the National Register of Historic Places in 2017.
