= Sylvanus Johnson House =

Historic house in Iowa, United States

- U.S. National Register of Historic Places
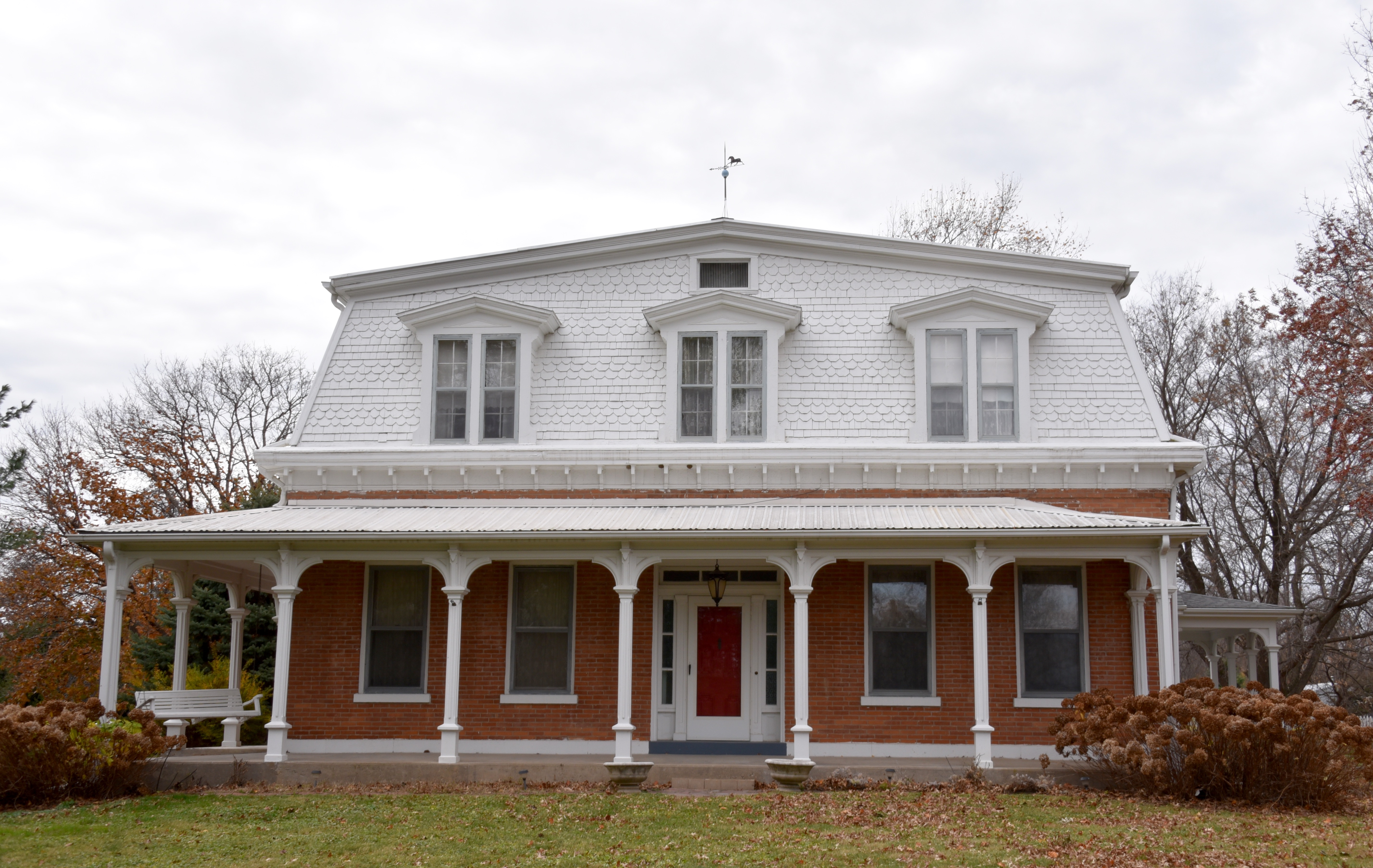

- Location within Iowa Location within the United States
- Location: 2155 Prairie du Chien Rd., Iowa City, Iowa
- Coordinates: 41°41′26″N 91°31′32.8″W
- Area: less than one acre
- Architectural style: Second Empire
- NRHP reference No.: 90001857
- Added to NRHP: December 6, 1990

The Sylvanus Johnson House, also known as Pinehurst, is a historic building located in Iowa City, Iowa, United States. Johnson was a Connecticut native who worked in his father's brickyard before moving to Iowa in 1837. He opened the first brickyard in Iowa City and provided the bricks for many of its oldest buildings, including the Old Capitol. He also provided the bricks for his own house, which is the first in the area to have a mansard roof. Because the floor plan is very similar to the 18th century double-hipped roof houses in his native Connecticut it is very possible they were the inspiration for this house. The Second Empire style, which this house also resembles, would not become popular until after the American Civil War. The house was listed on the National Register of Historic Places in 1990.
