= Coralville Union Ecclesiastical Church =

- U.S. National Register of Historic Places
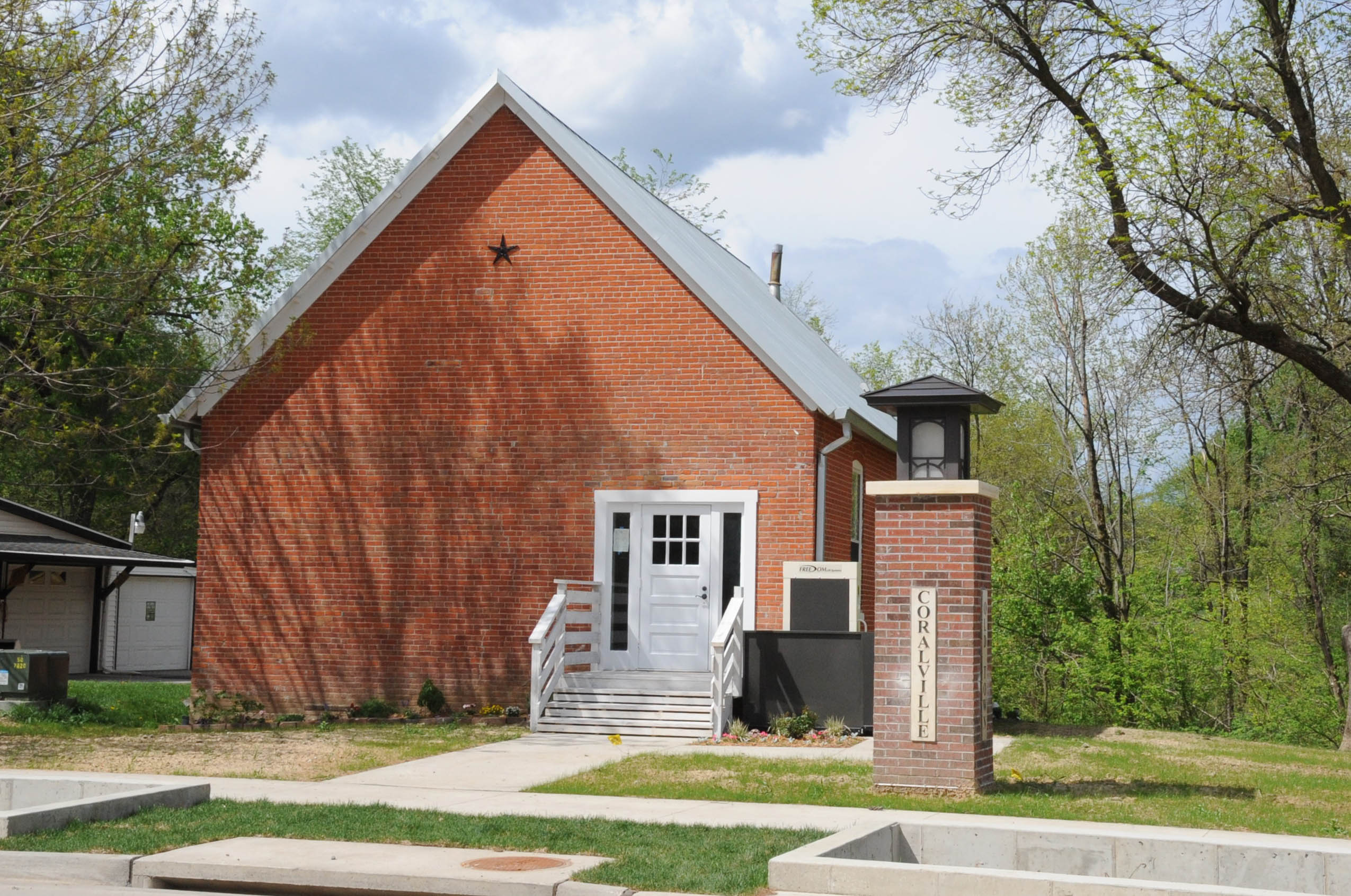
- The building in early Springtime

- Location within Iowa Location within the United States
- Location: 405 2nd Ave. Coralville, Iowa
- Coordinates: 41°40′27.2″N 91°34′13.3″W
- Area: less than one acre
- Built: 1885
- NRHP reference No.: 77000526
- Added to NRHP: April 11, 1977

Coralville Union Ecclesiastical Church, also known as Coralville Town Hall, is a historic building located at 405 2nd Avenue in Coralville, Iowa, United States. It was listed on the National Register of Historic Places in 1977.

== History ==
Coralville's first church was a frame structure built by a Methodist Episcopal congregation. It was destroyed in a fire around 1880. The Coralville Union Ecclesiastical Society was formed to build a new church. The simple brick structure with a gable roof was built about 1885 to serve as a multi-denominational church on the main floor and as a town hall on the lower level. Any orthodox church, which excluded the Unitarians or Universalists, could use the building. In addition to the town's administration, the lower level could be used for a variety of social functions, excluding dancing. The town purchased the building in 1921 for $2,500, and it was used as a school, a meeting house for the Evangelical Free Church, and as the town's administrative center. It was renovated for the later purpose in 1953.

After its use as a town hall the building was converted into a museum. The building stood in the way of economic development, and in order to preserve it, the city of Coralville moved it from Second Avenue to Fifth Street in 2014. It now sits across the street from the historic Coralville Public School (1876). Both buildings flank the entrance to a mixed use development known as Old Town.
