= Coralville Public School =

- U.S. National Register of Historic Places
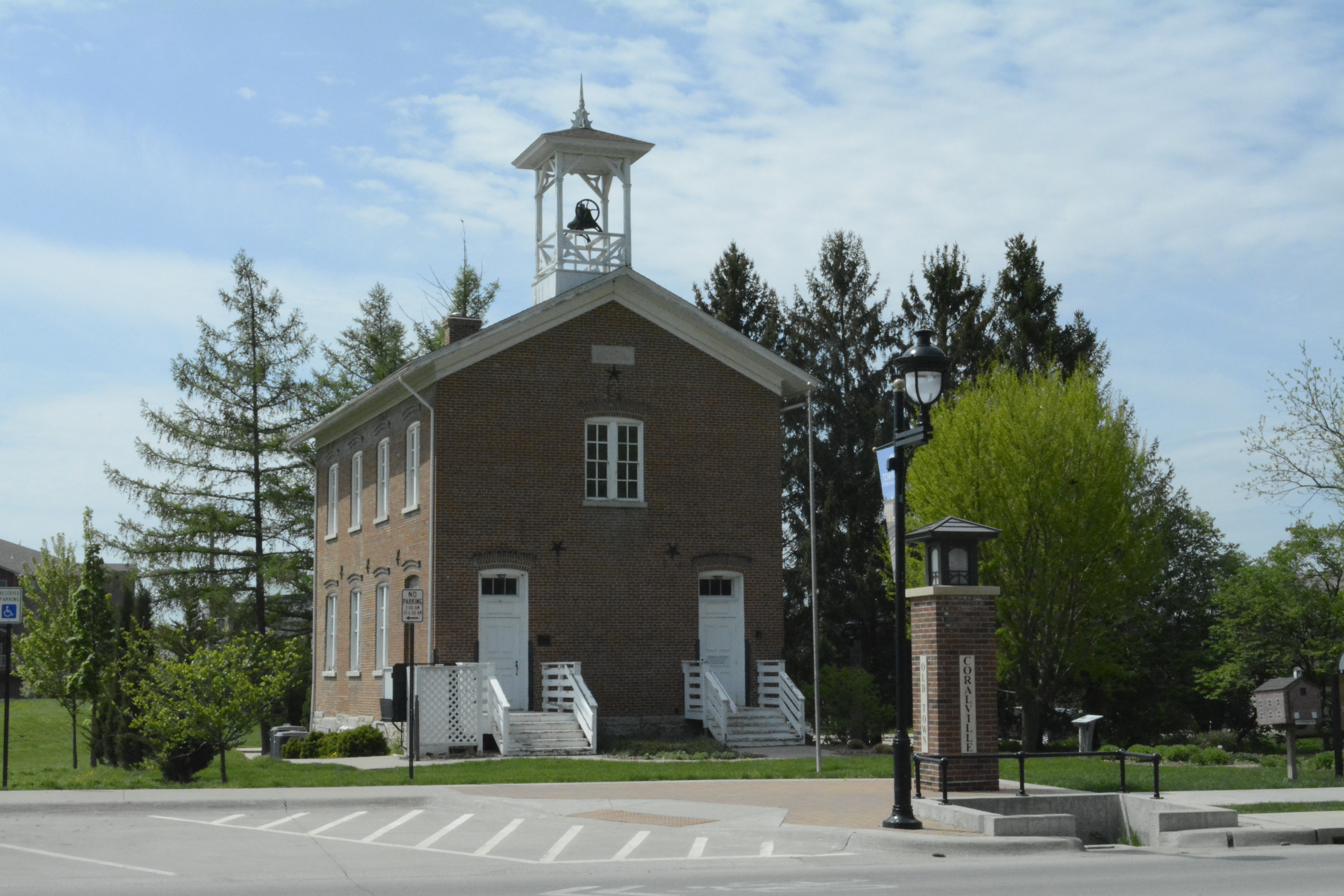
- The location of the schoolhouse on Fifth Street in Coralville

- Location within Iowa Location within the United States
- Location: 402-404 5th St., Coralville, Iowa
- Coordinates: 41°40′25.2″N 91°34′13.2″W
- Area: less than one acre
- Built: 1876
- NRHP reference No.: 74000789
- Added to NRHP: January 11, 1974

Coralville Public School, also known as the Fifth Street School, is a historic building located in Coralville, Iowa, United States. This two-story brick structure replaced Coralville's first school building, which was destroyed in a fire. It housed grades one through eight from 1876 to 1949, and it was the town's only school building during that time. It was closed two years later when Coralville schools became a part of the Iowa City Community School District. After its use as a school it has housed a teen center and then for the storage of school equipment. It has subsequently been converted into a museum. It was listed on the National Register of Historic Places in 1974. The former school now sits across the street from the historic Coralville Union Ecclesiastical Church and Town Hall (c. 1885), which was moved there in 2014. Both buildings flank the entrance to a mixed use development known as Old Town.

There are three cast-iron star clamps in a triangular pattern on the main facade, and three on each side of the structure. Their placement on the building is as much decorative as they are structural.
