= Nicking House =

Historic house in Iowa, United States

- U.S. National Register of Historic Places
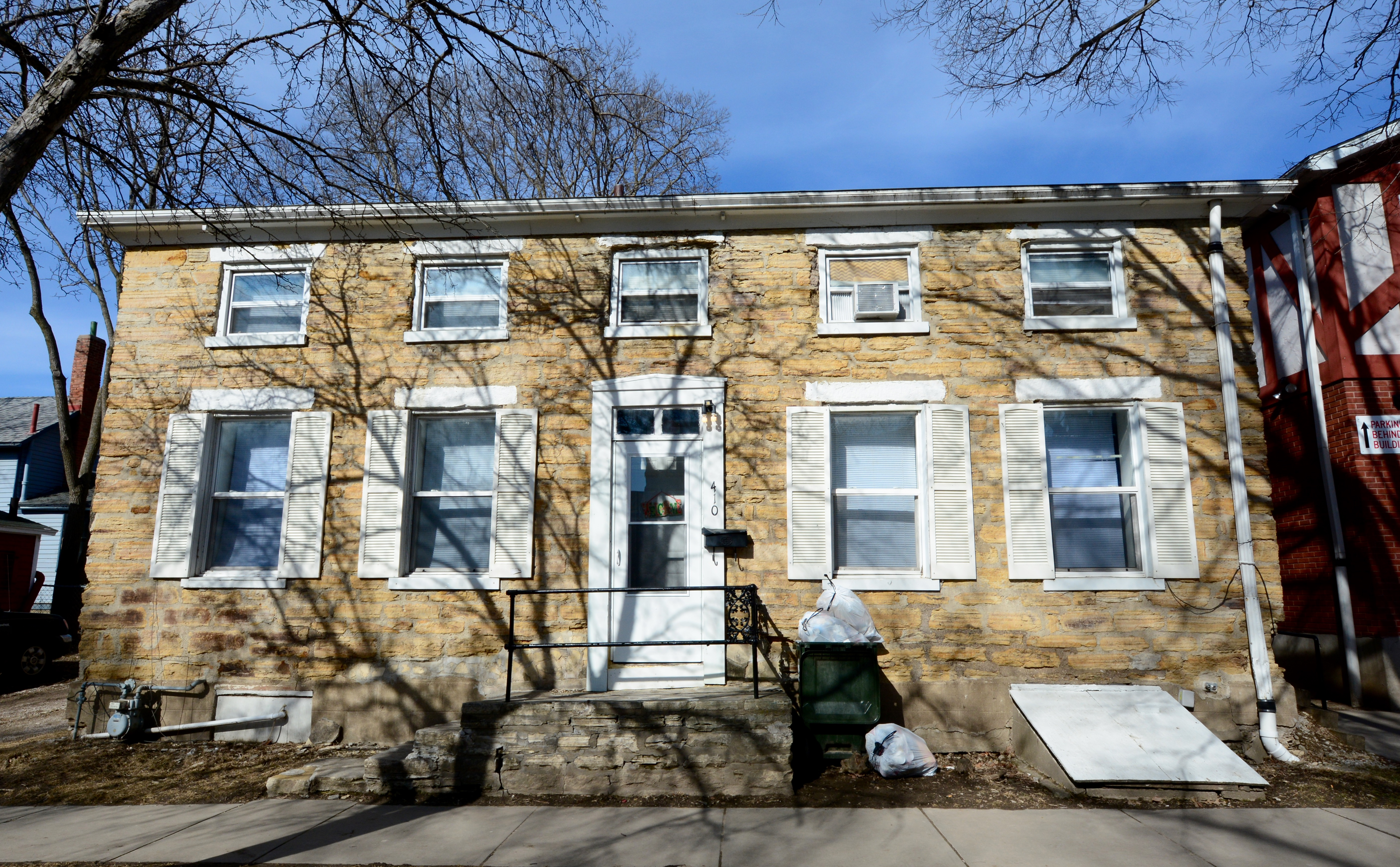

- Location within Iowa Location within the United States
- Location: 410 E. Market St. Iowa City, Iowa
- Coordinates: 41°39′49.5″N 91°31′46.7″W
- Area: less than one acre
- Built: 1854
- NRHP reference No.: 75000693
- Added to NRHP: April 21, 1975

The Nicking House is a historic building located in Iowa City, Iowa, United States. Henry C. Nicking, who was a barber, had this house built in 1854. It is one of the oldest houses in the city, and one of a very few that was constructed using sandstone. The general architectural style is a stripped-down version of the Greek Revival style, but a rear addition gives it a saltbox appearance. It features a symmetrical facade, side gable roof, limestone lintels and window sills, and cornice returns on the front. The house was listed on the National Register of Historic Places in 1975.
