= Union Bakery =

- U.S. National Register of Historic Places
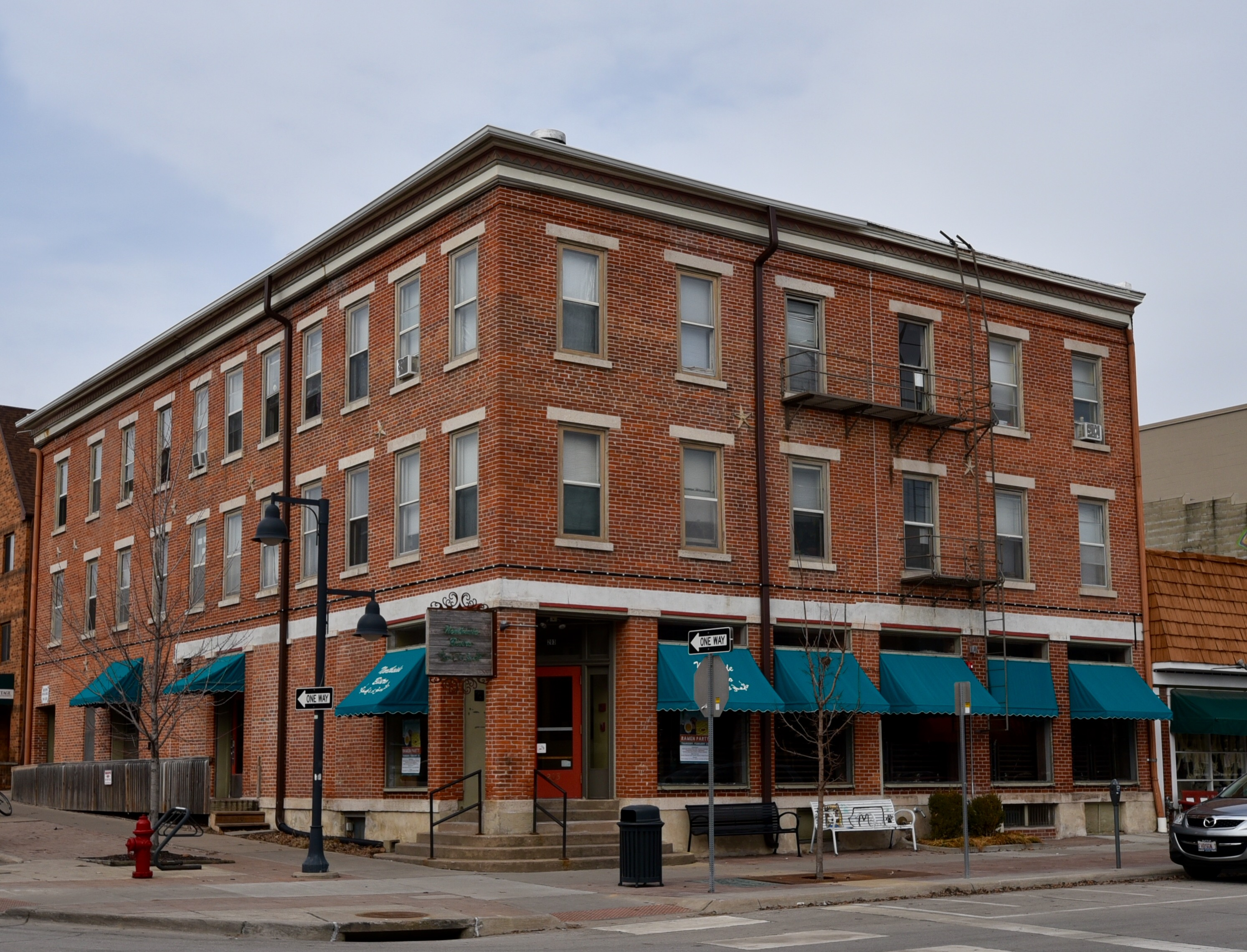

- Location within Iowa Location within the United States
- Location: 203 N. Linn St. Iowa City, Iowa
- Coordinates: 41°39′47.5″N 91°31′55.2″W
- Area: less than one acre
- Built: 1862, 1893
- Architectural style: Greek Revival
- NRHP reference No.: 15000893
- Added to NRHP: December 15, 2015

Union Bakery is a historic building located in Iowa City, Iowa.

== History ==
The first section of the building was built along Market Street around 1862, and an addition was built on the north side in 1893. The building reflects the entrepreneurial nature of Iowa City's German community who founded the bakery and built the original part of the building.

The ovens for the bakery were located in the basement and the retail portion of the business was located in the storefront along Linn Street. Other uses for the building have been a hotel, cafe, and a bar. It was listed on the National Register of Historic Places in 2015.

The three-story brick building is essentially a vernacular structure with elements of the Greek Revival style. Those elements include the raised foundation and stone water table, the pilasters with flat capitals and the belt course on the first-floor, stone lintels, and the "mousetooth" detail at the roofline that possibly references dentils.
