= Henyon-Kasper-Duffy Barn =

- U.S. National Register of Historic Places
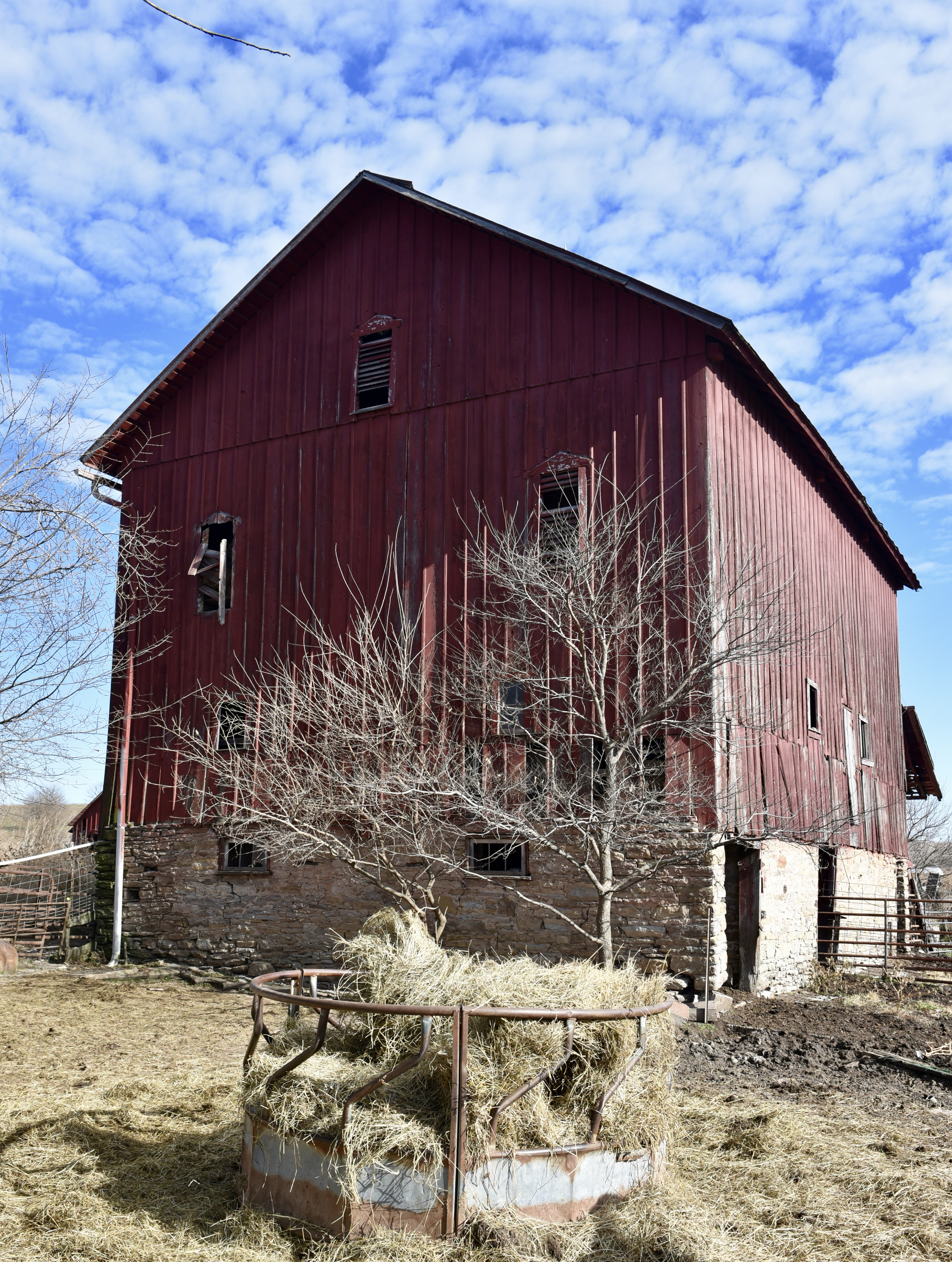

- Location within Iowa Location within the United States
- Location: 2520 Iowa Highway 1, NE.
- Nearest city: Solon, Iowa
- Coordinates: 41°44′58.7″N 91°28′20.9″W
- Area: less than one acre
- Built: 1874
- NRHP reference No.: 03001348
- Added to NRHP: January 2, 2004

Henyon-Kasper-Duffy Barn is a historic building located south of Solon, Iowa, United States. The barn was built for Bradford "Hoss" Henyon in 1876. He owned this farm from 1848 until his death in 1879. He used the barn as a changing station for horses on both the stage route and the mail route on the Old Dubuque Road, which passed in front of the farm. James B. Kasper bought the farm from the Henyon's and his son John took over from him. They also housed horses in the barn. John's son-in-law Charles D Duffy bought the farm from John Kasper, his father in law, and then his son Chuck succeeded him in the operation. Charles Duffy and wife Joyce housed hogs and then began the Newport Valley Shorthorn cattle Charles is well known for.

The barn is unusually tall for its time. In order to provide additional stability, it employs two tall canted (leaning) posts along with the more common vertical posts in its construction, which is unusual for a barn of this type. The canted posts support a secondary girt below the principal tie beam instead of the principal beam itself. The barn was listed on the National Register of Historic Places in 2004.
