= Cottage at Rock and Dubuque Streets =

Historic house in Iowa, United States

- U.S. National Register of Historic Places
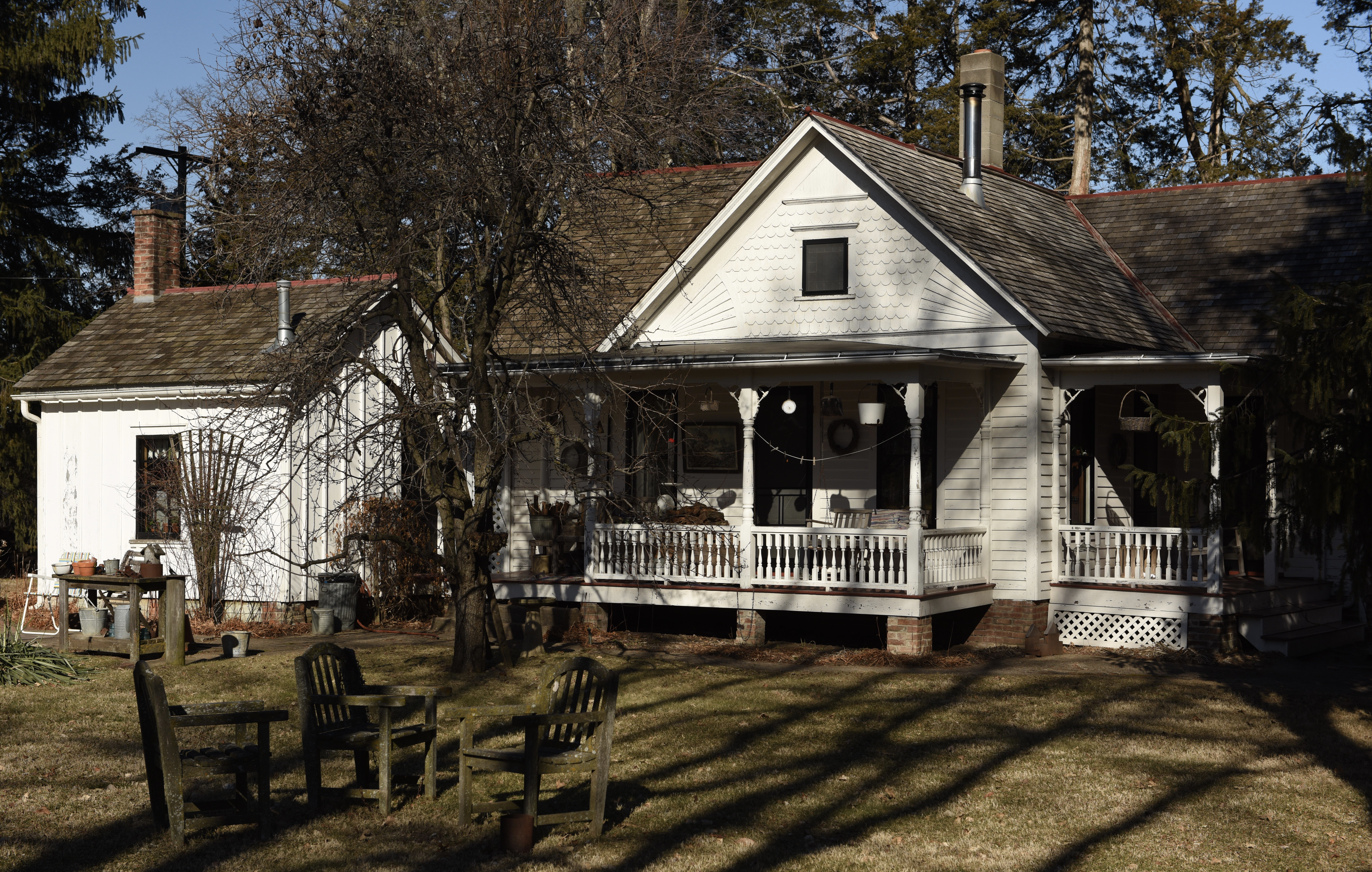

- Location within Iowa Location within the United States
- Location: Route 4, Box 3 Solon, Iowa
- Coordinates: 41°48′35″N 91°29′40″W
- Area: less than one acre
- Built: c. 1870
- Architectural style: Queen Anne
- NRHP reference No.: 85000004
- Added to NRHP: January 3, 1985

The Cottage at Rock and Dubuque Streets is a historic building located in Solon, Iowa, United States. It is a good example of applying elements of the Queen Anne style to a small-scale residence. The railroad arrived in Solon in 1870, which allowed the availability of ready made millwork for its construction. It was built sometime after 1870. The 1½-story frame structure has two porches. They feature turned columns, posts, and simple turned gingerbread ornamentation. The cottage was listed on the National Register of Historic Places in 1985.
