= East College Street Historic District =

Historic district in Iowa, United States

- U.S. National Register of Historic Places
- U.S. Historic district
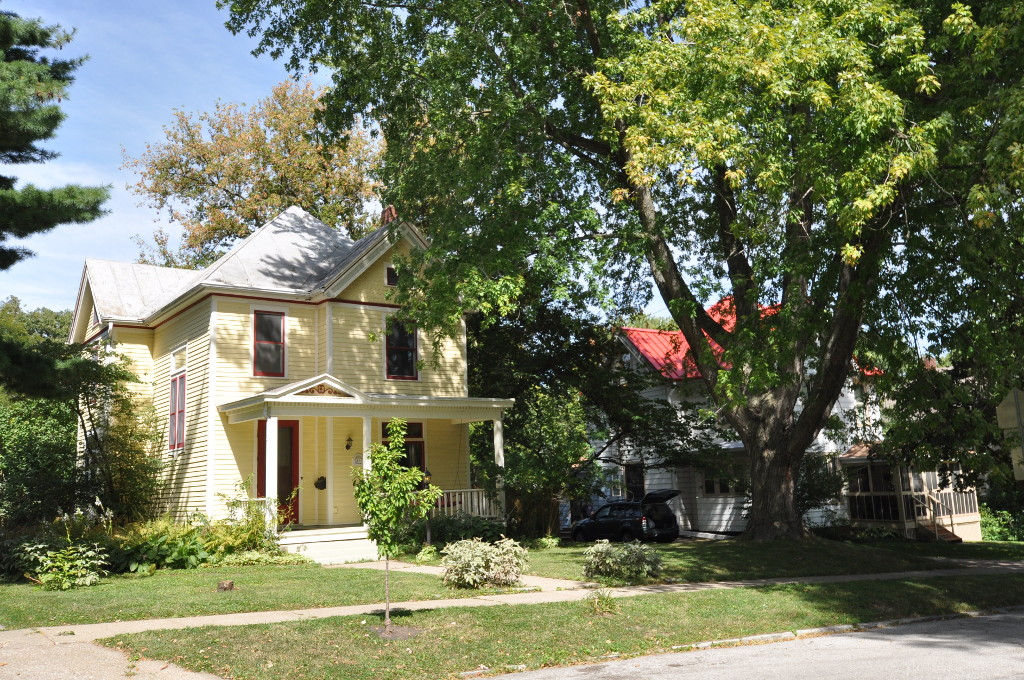

- Location within Iowa Location within the United States
- Location: Roughly bounded by Muscatine Ave., Summitt, Washington, and Burlington Sts., Iowa City, Iowa
- Coordinates: 41°39′32″N 91°31′10″W
- Area: 5.5 acres (2.2 ha)
- Architectural style: Late 19th and 20th Century Revivals; Late 19th and Early 20th Century American Movements
- MPS: Iowa City MPS
- NRHP reference No.: 97000624
- Added to NRHP: July 9, 1997

The East College Street Historic District is a nationally recognized historic district located in Iowa City, Iowa, United States. It was listed on the National Register of Historic Places in 1997. At the time of its nomination it consisted of 27 resources, which included 21 contributing buildings and six non-contributing buildings. This district is cohesive architecturally. While the earliest houses in the district were built in the 1880s, most were constructed between 1890 and 1920. The most prominent styles found here are the Queen Anne, American Foursquare, Bungalow and American Craftsman. The houses are mostly modest in size and ornamentation, and are all wood-frame construction.
