= Samuel and Emma A. Ranshaw House =

Historic house in Iowa, United States

- U.S. National Register of Historic Places
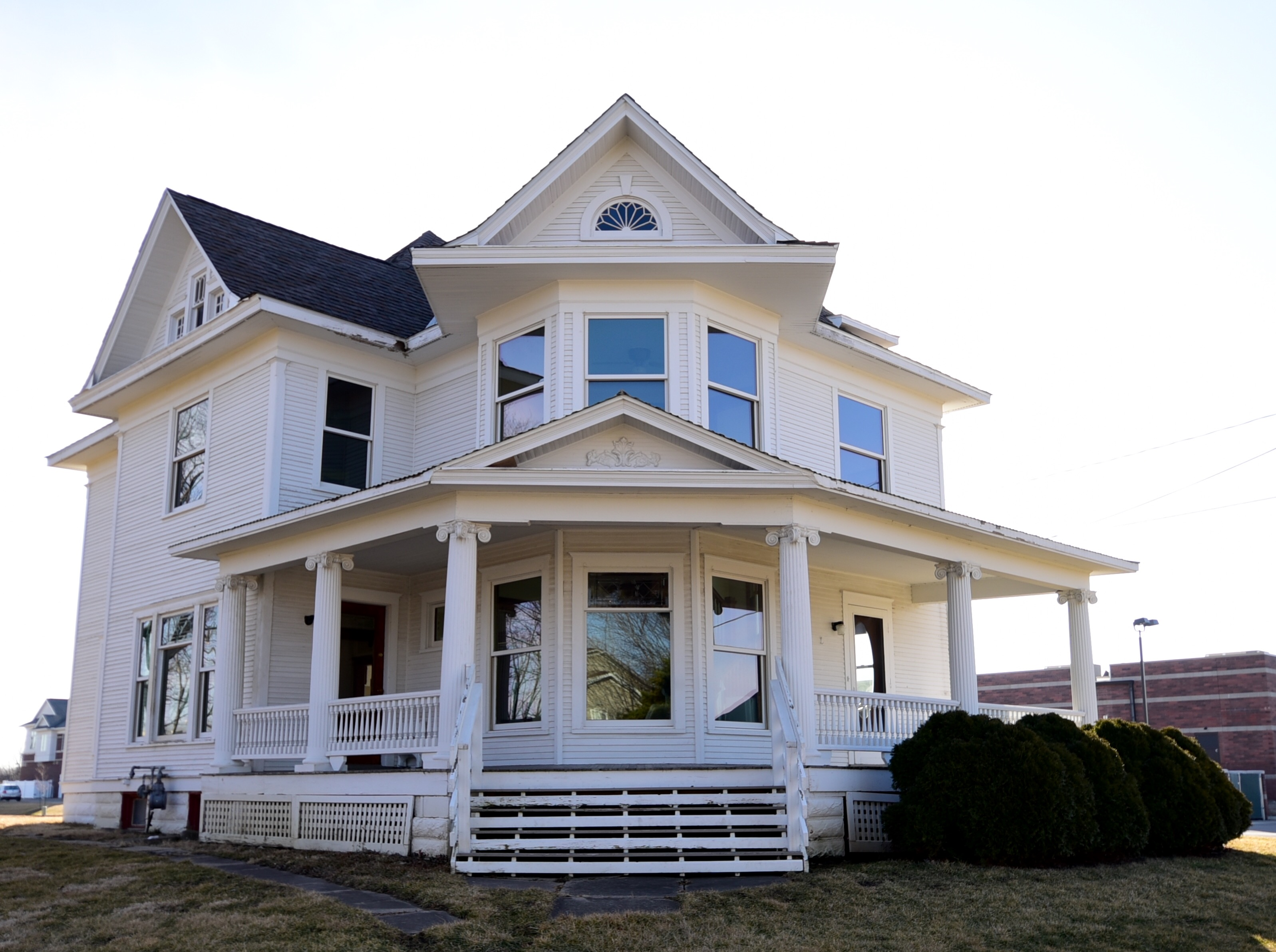
- The Ranshaw house is located near the community center in North Liberty

- Location within Iowa Location within the United States
- Location: 515 Community Drive; North Liberty, Iowa
- Coordinates: 41°45′05″N 91°36′21.7″W
- Area: 2 acres (0.81 ha)
- Built: 1908
- Architect: Bernard Alfred Wickham
- Architectural style: Queen Anne
- NRHP reference No.: 12000814
- Added to NRHP: September 26, 2012

The Samuel and Emma A. Ranshaw House is a historic building in North Liberty, Iowa, United States. At the time this house was built in 1908, North Liberty was a small and prosperous farming community. The Ranshaws engaged Iowa City architect-builder Bernard Wickham to design and construct this transitional Free Classic subtype of the Queen Anne style. It is characterized by simple classical decorative details that were becoming popular in the early 20th-century, as opposed to the more elaborate elements of the Late Victorian style. It was a typical house that Wickham was building in this area. The 10-acre (4.0 ha) farmstead on which it was built was surrounded by farm fields just to the west of the town. Suburban development now surrounds the house on its 2-acre (0.81 ha) lot. In addition to the house, a concrete sidewalk and cistern cap with inlaid glass marbles that are set in geometric and floral patterns is included in the nomination. They were listed on the National Register of Historic Places in 2012.
