= Tate Arms =

Historic house in Iowa, United States

- U.S. National Register of Historic Places
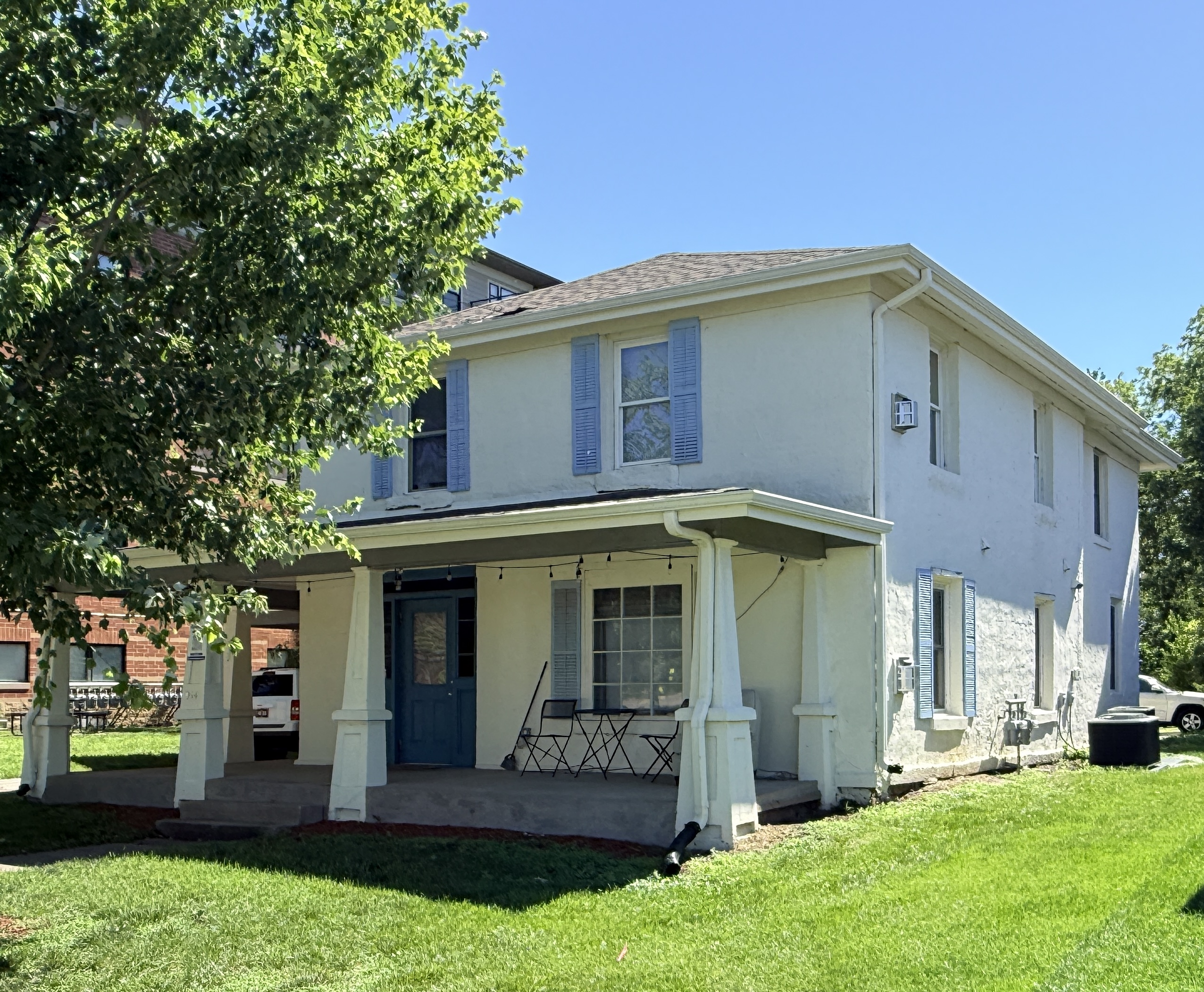
- Tate Arms in 2026

- Location within Iowa Location within the United States
- Location: 914 S. Dubuque St. Iowa City, Iowa
- Coordinates: 41°39′02″N 91°31′58″W
- Area: less than one acre
- Built: 1914
- Architectural style: American Foursquare
- NRHP reference No.: 100004732
- Added to NRHP: December 9, 2019

Tate Arms, also known as the Charles and Dorothy Alberts House and the Williams Hotel, is a historic building located in Iowa City, Iowa, United States. The University of Iowa started to admit African American students in the 1870s, but they were rare before the 1910s. The university constructed dormitories in the 1910s, but they did not allow African Americans to live in them until 1946. Completed in 1914 for Charles and Dorothy Alberts, this house was Iowa City's first rooming house that was built for black tenants and owned by black landlords. Charles Alberts was a stonemason and he operated a cement block manufacturing business. He might have built the house himself. The first black university student started to reside here in 1920. The building was acquired by local attorney Edward F. Rate, who was white, in the 1920s and he continued to rent to African Americans. From c. 1928 to c. 1932 the house was known as the Williams Hotel after its proprietor James Williams, who also owned a car wash.

Elizabeth “Bettye” Tate and Junious “Bud” Tate bought the house in 1940. Bud operated a janitorial service, and Bettye had operated a rooming house for black male students in their previous home at East Prentiss Street. She later spent 22 years working at the University of Iowa's cardiovascular laboratory. After the Tate's bought this 12-room house they changed the name to the Tate Arms and housed up to 20 male students a year. Bettye was known for her disciplined residence and did not permit liquor, women in the bedrooms, and tenants were expected to make their beds. The Tate Arms continued as a black student boarding house until 1961 when the Tates divorced. It continued to house students after this time, but they were not necessarily black. Housing discrimination in Iowa City continued until the Fair Housing Amendment to the Iowa Civil Rights Act was passed in 1967. Prior to that there was no history of city ordinances requiring racial segregation in housing, it was just a fact. In 1979 Bettye Tate sold the building, which had been vacant since 1970, and it was slated for demolition several times until 2014 when it was designated an Iowa City Historic Landmark. The building was listed on the National Register of Historic Places in 2019.
