= Letovsky-Rohret House =

Historic house in Iowa, United States

- U.S. National Register of Historic Places
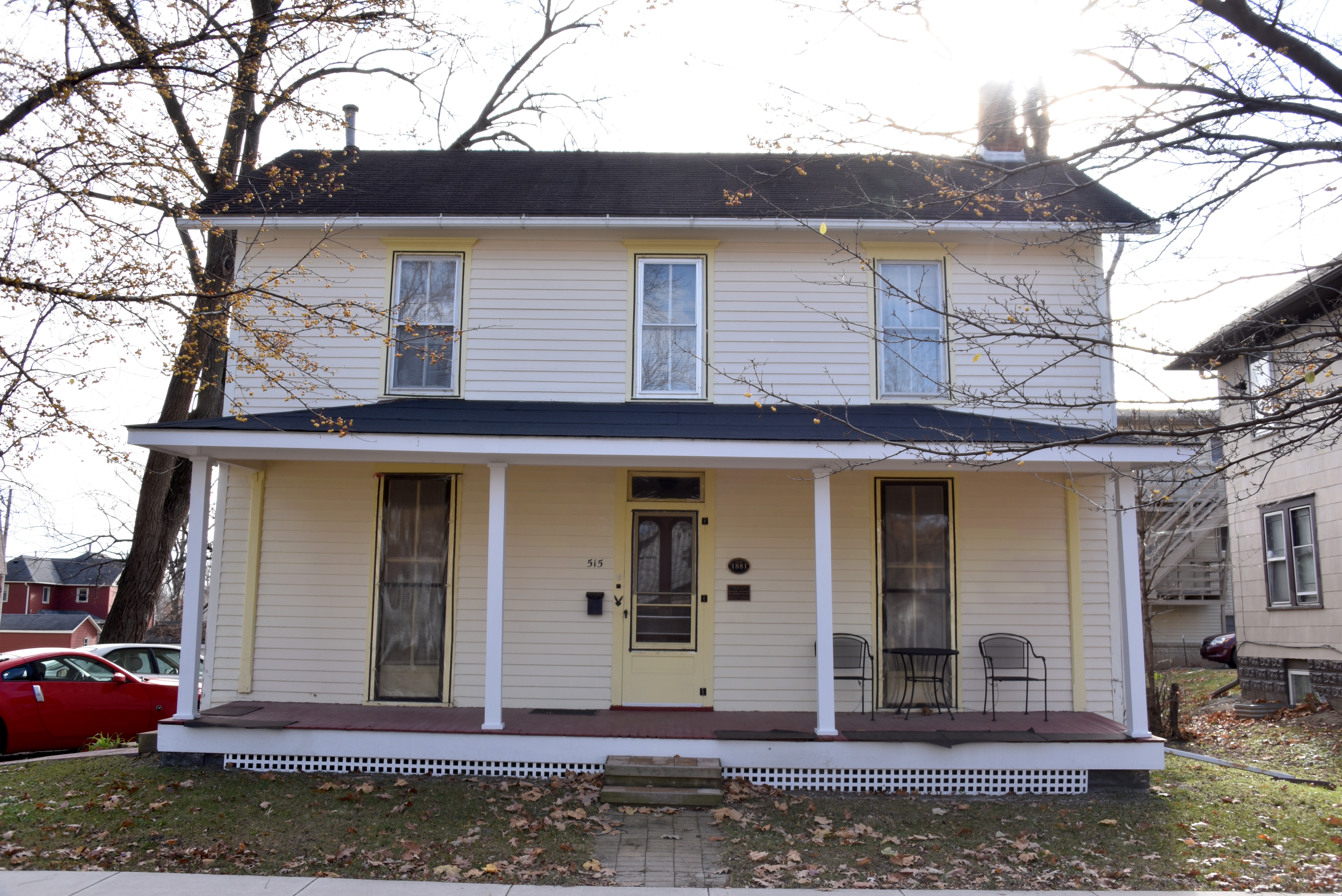

- Location within Iowa Location within the United States
- Location: 515 E. Davenport St. Iowa City, Iowa
- Coordinates: 41°39′55.9″N 91°31′40.8″W
- Area: less than one acre
- Built: 1881
- Architectural style: Greek Revival; Italianate
- NRHP reference No.: 82002624
- Added to NRHP: April 12, 1982

The Letovsky-Rohret House is a historic building located in Iowa City, Iowa, United States. This simple two-story wood-frame structure largely embodies the Greek Revival style with its side gable roof, entablature window and door heads, boxed cornice and plain frieze, and its pedimented attic vents. The tall windows on the first floor and arched windows on the main door reflect elements of the Italianate style. Built in 1881, the house originally faced Van Buren Street, but it was turned to face Davenport Street in 1919 and placed on the eastern end of its lot so two more house could be built there.

The house is associated with two immigrant families. Bonhumil Barta Letovsky, who had the house built, was born in present-day Czech Republic. His father helped found the first Czech language newspaper in the United States, Slovan Amerikansky, in Wisconsin. After they settled in Iowa City they established Iowa's first Czech newspaper, Slovan Americky. After the family relocated to Cedar Rapids, Iowa with its larger Czech community, the house was bought by Mary H. Rohret in 1891. Her husband Peter was a native of Bavaria and was known for his ax skills. While he worked most of his life as a farmer, Rohret is thought to have helped build the Old Capitol in Iowa City in his youth. He was also involved in local politics. The Rohrets lived here until their respective deaths in 1914 (Peter) and 1918 (Mary). The house was listed on the National Register of Historic Places in 1982.
