= F. X. Rittenmeyer House =

Historic house in Iowa, United States

- U.S. National Register of Historic Places
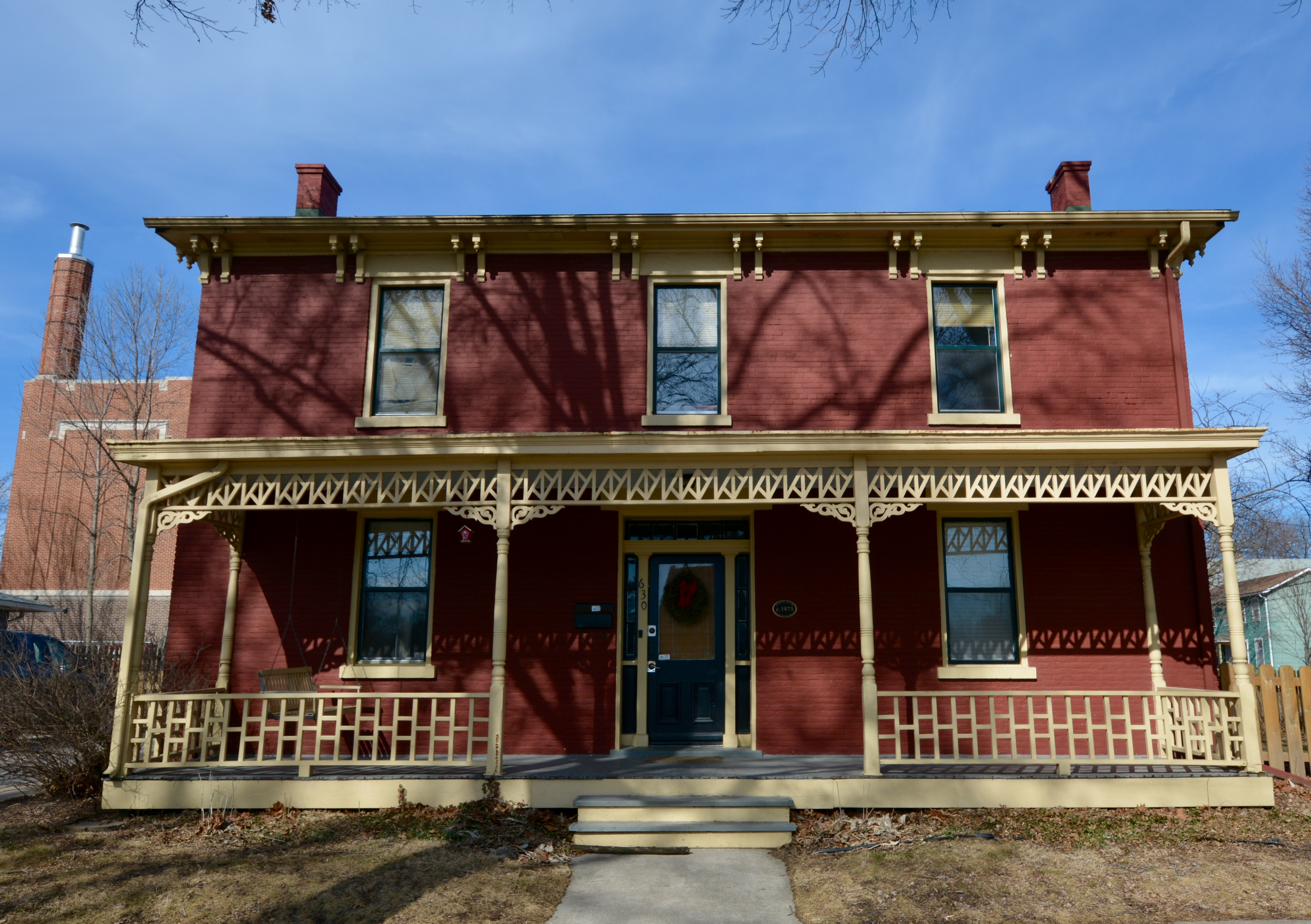

- Location within Iowa Location within the United States
- Location: 630 E. Fairchild St., Iowa City, Iowa
- Coordinates: 41°40′01.2″N 91°31′33.6″W
- Area: less than one acre
- Built: 1875
- NRHP reference No.: 79000906
- Added to NRHP: May 31, 1979

The F. X. Rittenmeyer House is a historic building located in Iowa City, Iowa, United States. Built in the mid-1870s, this two-story brick house is a typical residential building found in Iowa City from this era. While it lacks the elaborate window hoods and broad cornice typically found on these houses, it does include bracketed eaves. There is also a single story kitchen wing off the back of the house. Somewhat unique to this house is the front porch with its geometrically patterned frieze, which is thought to be a later addition. The house was listed on the National Register of Historic Places in 1979.
