= Woodlawn Historic District (Iowa City, Iowa) =

Historic district in Iowa, United States

- U.S. National Register of Historic Places
- U.S. Historic district
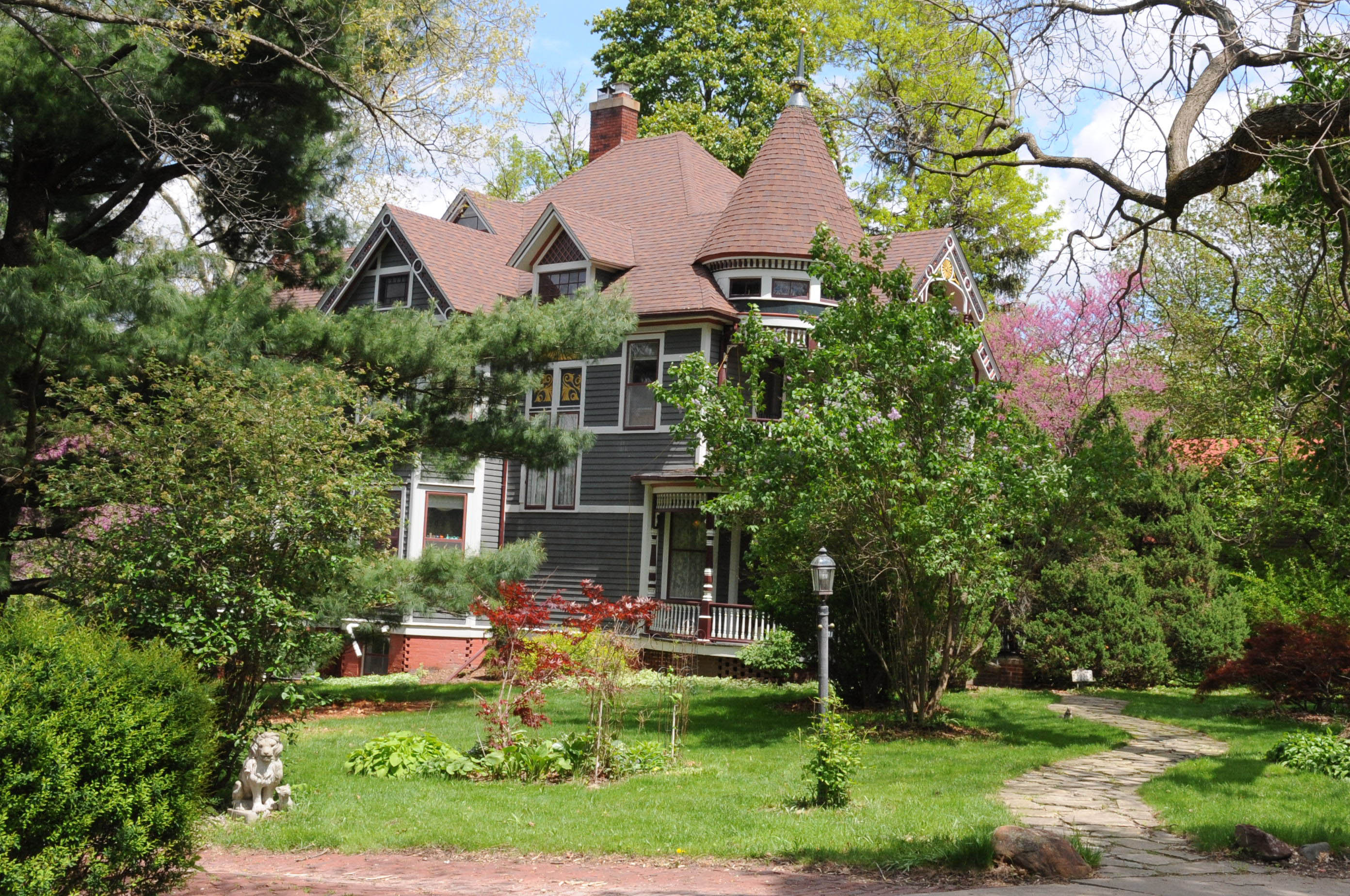
- 1036 Woodlawn St. (c. 1895)

- Location within Iowa Location within the United States
- Location: Irregular pattern along Woodlawn Ave., Iowa City, Iowa
- Coordinates: 41°39′40″N 91°31′10″W
- Area: approximately 8 acres (3.2 ha)
- Architectural style: Late Victorian; Queen Anne
- NRHP reference No.: 79000907
- Added to NRHP: March 26, 1979

The Woodlawn Historic District is a nationally recognized historic district located in Iowa City, Iowa, United States. It was listed on the National Register of Historic Places in 1979. At the time of its nomination it consisted of 14 resources, all of which are contributing buildings. The district is largely on Woodlawn Street, a gravel dead-end extension of Iowa Avenue. The eastern terminus of Iowa Avenue was originally planned to be a block to the west and was to be the location of the Governor's Mansion, but it was never built. The Old Capitol is on western terminus of the same street. The district is an enclave of upper-middle-class houses on Woodlawn and Evans Streets. Nine of the houses were built in the late 19th century, two were built in the 1920s, and two were built in mid-20th century. There is also a four-story Tudor Revival apartment building on Evans Street that was built in 1926. All of the buildings are located on deep set-backs on large landscaped lots that provide seclusion and cohesion, which is what gives them their significance. The most prominent house is a Queen Anne style home at 1036 Woodlawn Street.
