= Summit Apartment Building =

- U.S. National Register of Historic Places
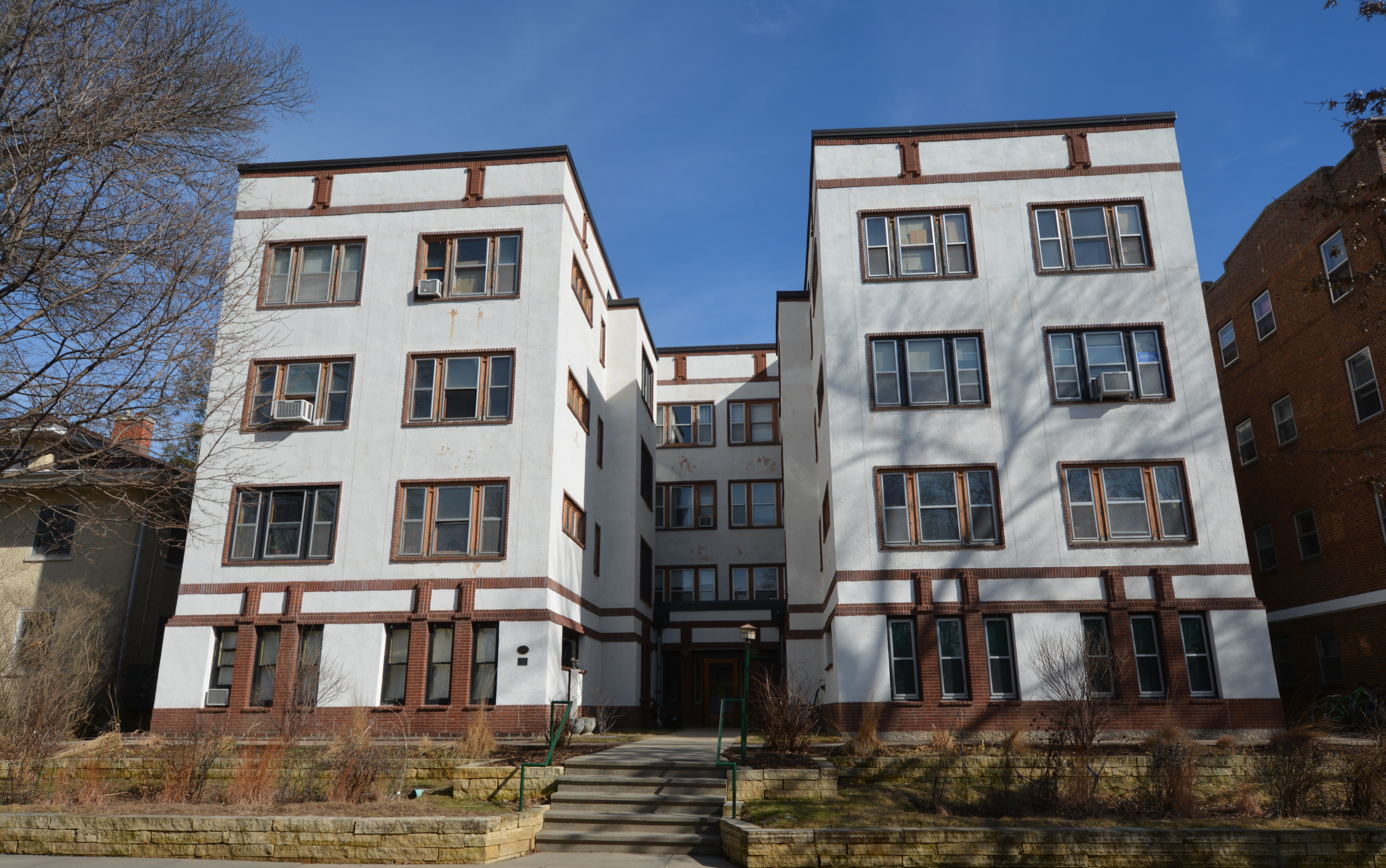

- Location within Iowa Location within the United States
- Location: 228 S. Summit St. Iowa City, Iowa
- Coordinates: 41°39′29.5″N 91°31′15.2″W
- Area: less than one acre
- Built: 1916
- Architect: Parker N. Berry
- Architectural style: Prairie School
- NRHP reference No.: 83004188
- Added to NRHP: September 29, 1983

The Summit Apartment Building, also known as the Summit Street Cooperative Apartments, is a historic building located in Iowa City, Iowa, United States. This is the only known Iowa work of Chicago architect Parker Nobel Berry, a student of, and chief designer for, Louis Sullivan. The building is a stripped-down version of his original plan, which proved too expensive to build. The three-story structure follows a U-shaped plan, and is built on a raised basement. Completed in 1916, it was Iowa City's first apartment flat. The Prairie School-style building was built by local developer, Dr. Frank C. Titzell, who continued to own it until his death in 1932. His wife Bertha owned it until 1939 when she sold it to an out-of-state buyer. In 1947 it became the first Housing cooperative in the state after the Iowa General Assembly passed the Cooperative Housing Authorization Act earlier in the same year. The building was listed on the National Register of Historic Places in 1983.
