= Roland and Marilyn Wehner House =

Historic house in Iowa, United States

- U.S. National Register of Historic Places
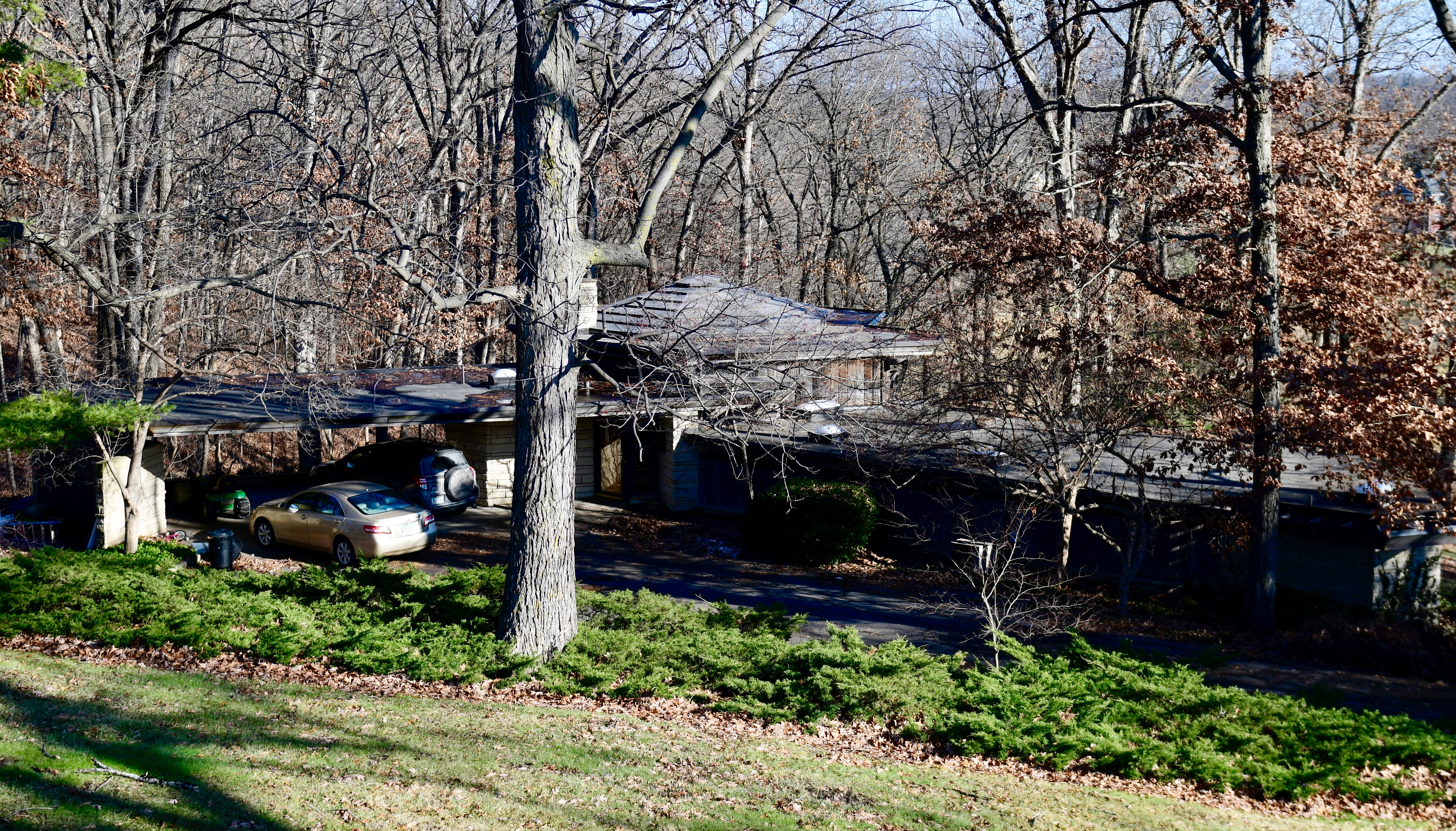

- Location within Iowa Location within the United States
- Location: 3112 Iowa Highway 1
- Nearest city: Iowa City, Iowa
- Coordinates: 41°42′28.8″N 91°28′58.5″W
- Area: 2.33 acres (0.94 ha)
- Built: 1959, 1964
- Architect: Roland C. Wehner
- Architectural style: Modern Movement
- NRHP reference No.: 13000691
- Added to NRHP: September 9, 2013

The Roland and Marilyn Wehner House is a historic building located north of Iowa City, Iowa, United States. Local architect Roland Wehner designed this house for his own residence. Its architectural influence are the Usonian houses designed by Frank Lloyd Wright. In particular, Wehner was interested in creating a "modular, affordable, and organic design" for his home. This was his first Wrightian design out of college. The Wehner's bought the 2.33-acre (0.94 ha) property and moved their mobile home here in 1957. Because they had no children and limited funds, the main living pavilion and carport were completed in 1959. As the family grew the bedroom wing was added in 1964. The house is located on a wooded lot in a rural area. It follows an asymmetrical plan that is centered on the two-story living pavilion. The carport juts out to the northwest, the bedroom wing to the southwest, and the cantilevered deck to the east. Most of the windows face the east and south to take advantage of the sun, and to face away from the highway to the west. The exterior is composed of Anamosa Limestone and California Redwood siding. The house was listed on the National Register of Historic Places in 2013.
