= Elizabeth Tate =

Civil rights advocate during the American Civil Rights Movement

Elizabeth Crawford ("Bettye") Tate (June 22, 1906 – September 11, 1999) was a civil rights advocate during the Civil Rights Movement of the 1950s and 1960s that desegregated African-Americans across the United States of America.

== Biography ==
Elizabeth (Bettye)Crawford Tate was born in Fairfield, Iowa, in 1906.https://share.google/9GUjK2UgKzGmxY5n2 Tate graduated from Fairfield High School, Iowa, in 1926. Tate worked at the cardiovascular lab at the University of Iowa hospital; she retired in 1976.

In 1938 Tate bought a house for $3,300 that would later become a boarding house in Iowa City for African-American students who were not allowed to use the normal university accommodation. In the house Tate did the cooking while the boys staying at the house cleaned up. The house, Tate Arms, was named an historic landmark in 2014 and was added to the National Register of Historic Places in 2020. Tate Arms started housing black students in 1938, and created a "home away from home" for the people who lived there. Tate sold the building in 1979.

== Honors ==
In 2005, Iowa City named its alternative high school, Tate High School, in honor of Tate.
