= Cavanaugh-Zetek House =

Historic house in Iowa, United States

- U.S. National Register of Historic Places
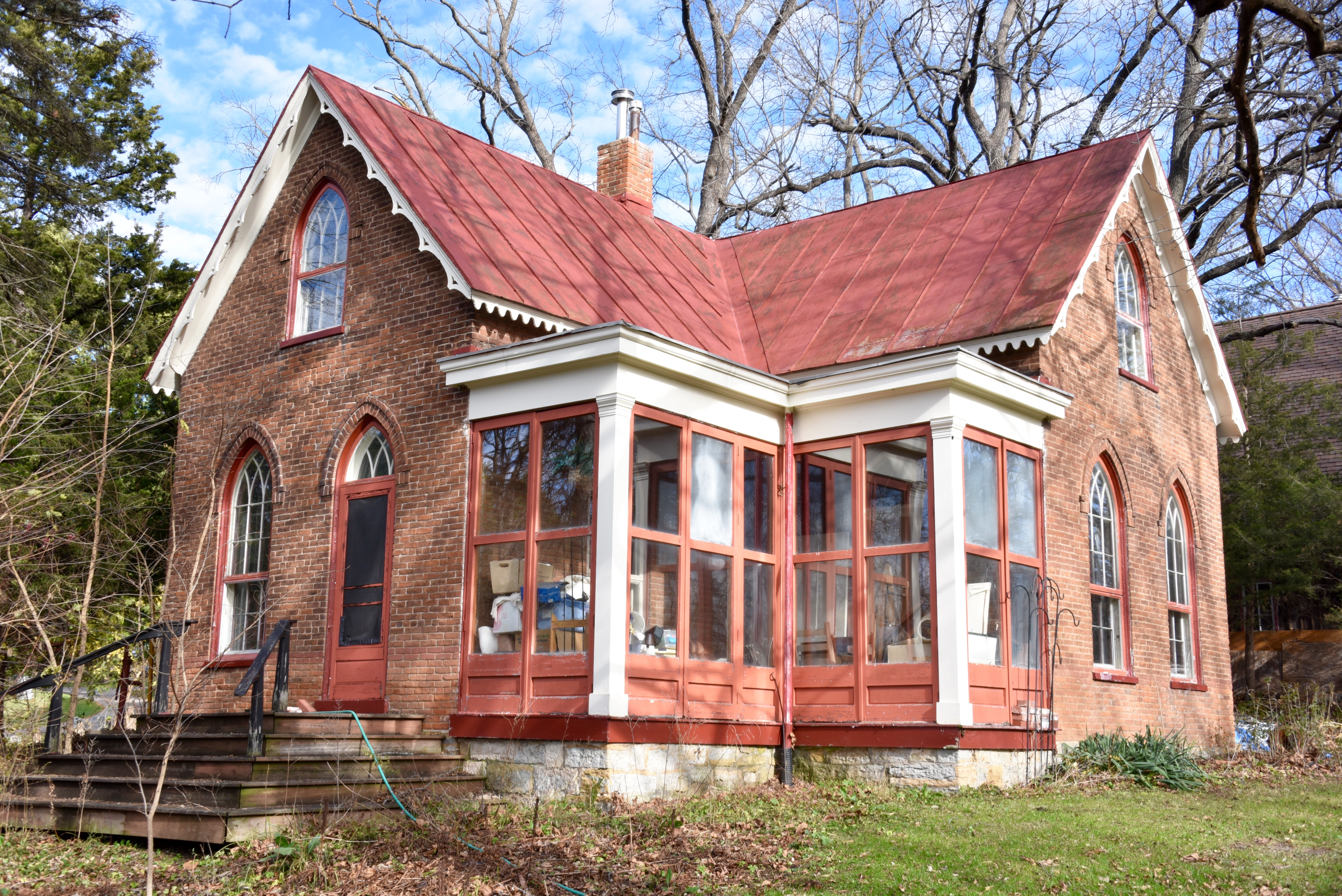

- Location within Iowa Location within the United States
- Location: 704 Reno St., Iowa City, Iowa
- Coordinates: 41°40′09.1″N 91°31′05″W
- Area: less than one acre
- Built: 1870
- Architectural style: Gothic Revival
- NRHP reference No.: 77000527
- Added to NRHP: September 16, 1977

The Cavanaugh-Zetek House (also known as the Cavanuagh House) is a historic house located at 704 Reno Street in Iowa City, Iowa.

== Description and history ==
Ohio native James Cavanaugh (Cavanagh) was the first owner of the house. He was a farmer who was involved in local politics. His widow Amy died in 1902, and the house was sold to Joseph Zetek. It remained in his family until 1976. This is one of two brick Gothic Revival houses in the city. The 1¼-story, L-shaped structure with a single-story addition on the north side features pointed-arch doorways and tracery windows on the south and west elevations. There is a glass enclosed porch in the middle of the "L".

The house was listed on the National Register of Historic Places on September 16, 1977.
