= Old Settlers' Association of Johnson County Cabins =

- U.S. National Register of Historic Places
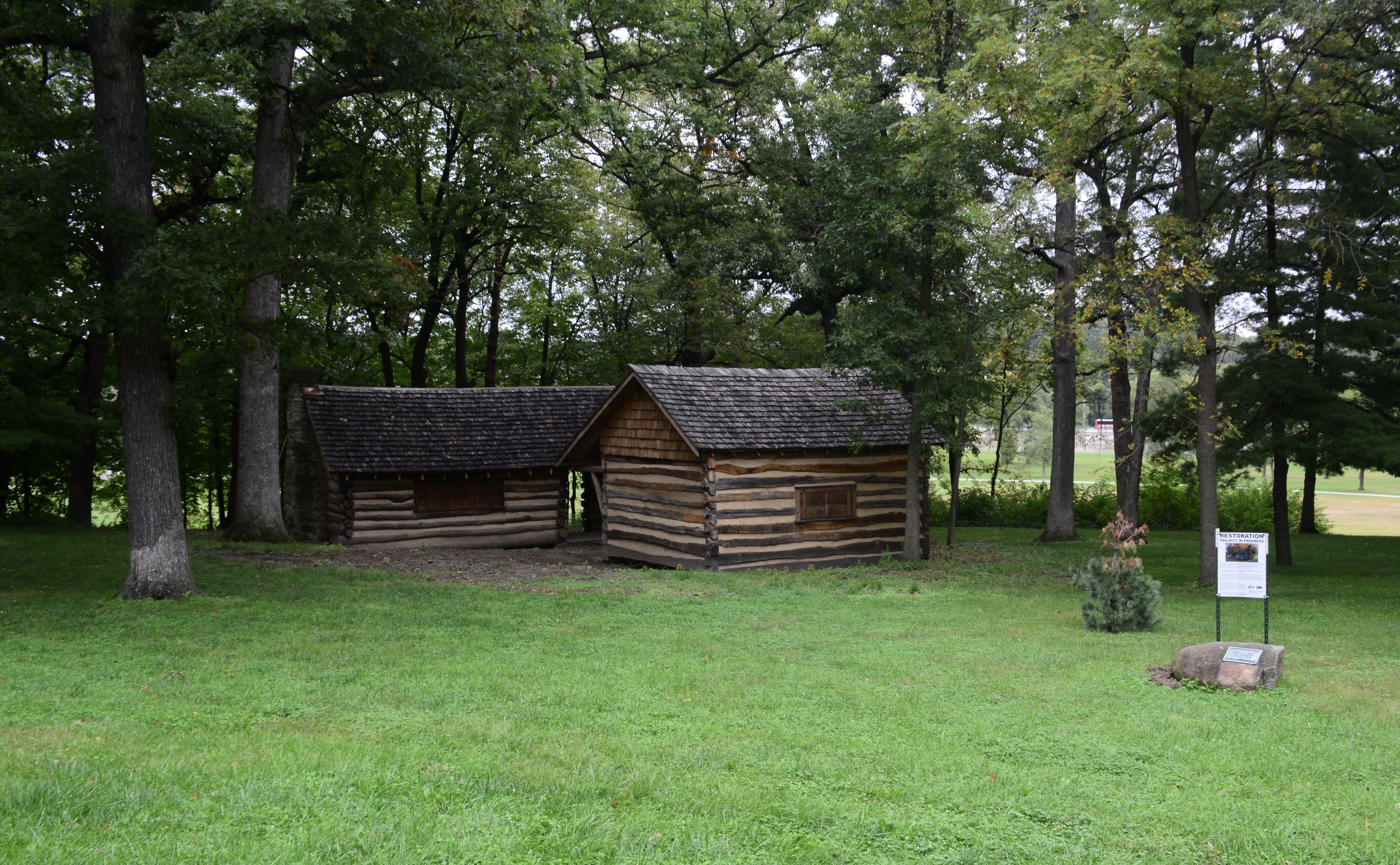

- Location within Iowa Location within the United States
- Location: Upper City Park Rd. off 100 blk. Park Rd., Iowa City, Iowa
- Coordinates: 41°40′22.2″N 91°32′14.2″W
- Area: less than one acre
- Built: 1906
- Architect: Old Settlers Assoc. of Johnson County
- NRHP reference No.: 13000429
- Added to NRHP: June 25, 2013

The Old Settlers' Association of Johnson County Cabins, also known as City Park Cabins, are historic buildings located in Iowa City, Iowa, United States. These are two log structures built by the Old Settlers' Association of Johnson County. The single-room log cabin was built in 1889 for Johnson County's semicentennial. It had been located at two different county fairground sites until it was moved to City Park in 1918. The second cabin was built here by the association in 1913. It is a dogtrot house that is meant to be a replica of an early trading post in this area. These are typical log house forms from Iowa's pioneer era whose existence are now rare. They also represent an effort by a social organization to commemorate the community's common pioneer heritage. A third element that is part of the historical designation is a bronze plaque affixed to a granite boulder. Located southwest of the cabins, it was installed in 1929 to mark a "Grand Army Tree" that was planted nearby. It is not known if the tree survives. The buildings and plaque were listed together on the National Register of Historic Places in 2013.
