= Hawthorne Glove and Novelty Company–Shrader Drug Company Building =

- U.S. National Register of Historic Places
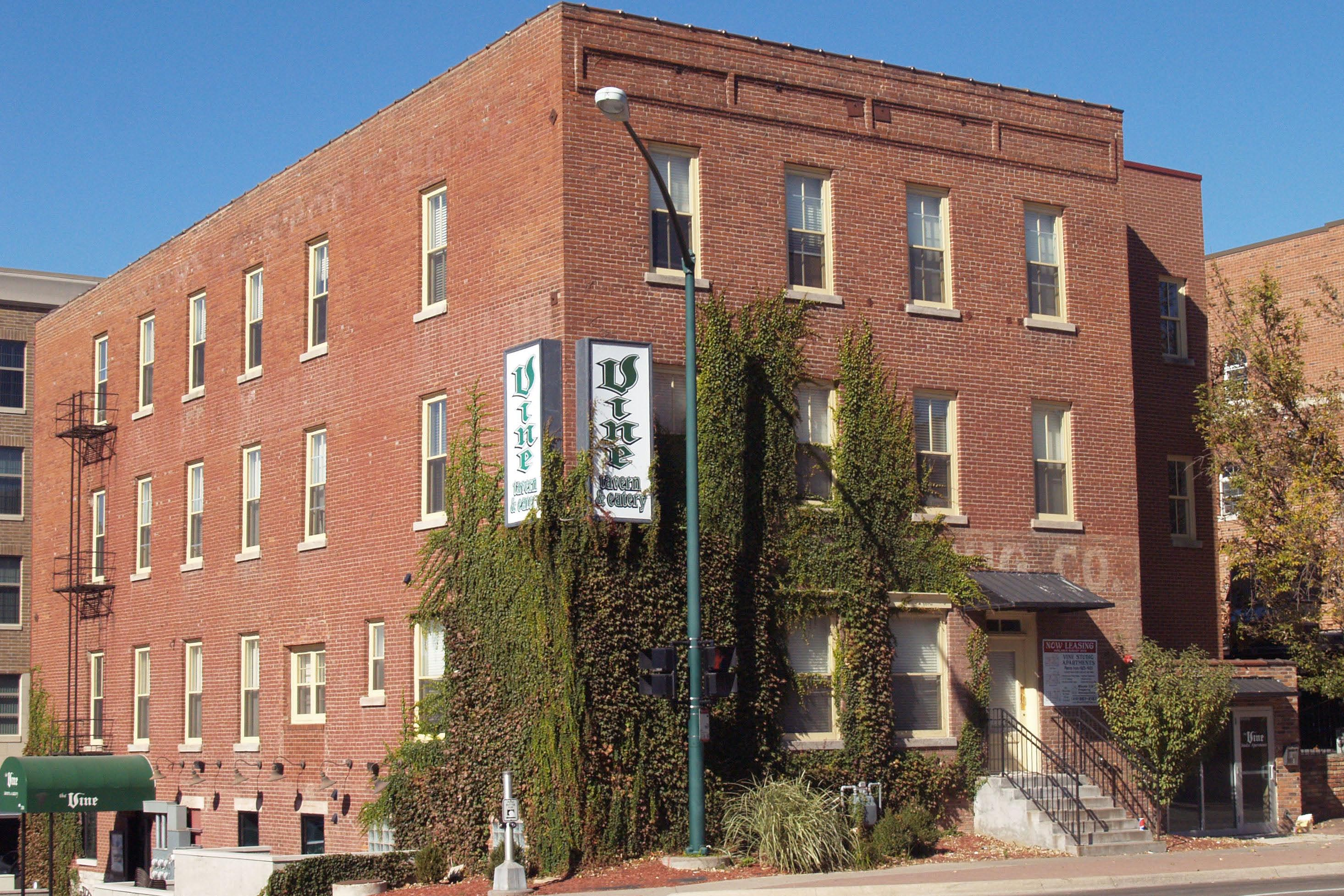

- Location within Iowa Location within the United States
- Location: 529 S. Gilbert St. Iowa City, Iowa
- Coordinates: 41°39′16.4″N 91°31′49.9″W
- Area: less than one acre
- Built: 1906
- NRHP reference No.: 14000666
- Added to NRHP: April 7, 2014

The Hawthorne Glove and Novelty Company–Shrader Drug Company Building is a historic building located in Iowa City, Iowa, United States. Completed in 1906, this utilitarian three-story brick structure is located in the city's original railroad and industrial corridor south of the central business district. This was an industrial area from the 1870s to the 1940s. It replaced a recently built building on the same site by the Hawthorne Glove and Novelty Company that had been destroyed in a fire. The back of the building opened upon the rail sidings of a branch line of the Burlington, Cedar Rapids and Northern Railway, later the Chicago, Rock Island and Pacific. By the start of World War I the Shrader Drug Company occupied the building. It was one of three drug related factories that were located along the South Gilbert Street corridor at that time. The company name changed to the Hewell-Shrader Drug Company in 1930 and then the Hewell-Shrader Company in 1945 after farm fertilizer was added to its product line. The company closed in 1956, and the building was sold to the Thompson Transfer and Storage Company who used it for a warehouse. Whipple House Furniture Store took over the building three years later, and remained until 1975. In the intervening years a variety of businesses occupied the building until the 1980s when it was vacant for a period of time. In the mid-1980s The Vine Tavern occupied the basement level and the upper floors were used for artist studios. In 2012 the upper floors were converted into apartments. The building was listed on the National Register of Historic Places in 2014.
