= Isaac Augustus Wetherby =

American painter and photographer

Isaac Augustus Wetherby (1819-1904) or I.A. Wetherbee was an American painter and photographer. He worked in Boston, Massachusetts, and in Iowa. Examples of his work are in the Beverly Historical Society, Massachusetts; Fruitlands Museum; New York Historical Society; and the State Historical Society of Iowa.
