= Lincoln Township, Johnson County, Iowa =

Township in Johnson County, Iowa, U.S.

Coordinates: 41.5547°N 91.4058°W

Lincoln Township is a township in Johnson County, Iowa, United States.

== History ==
Lincoln Township was organized in 1870.
