= Union Brewery (Iowa) =

- U.S. National Register of Historic Places
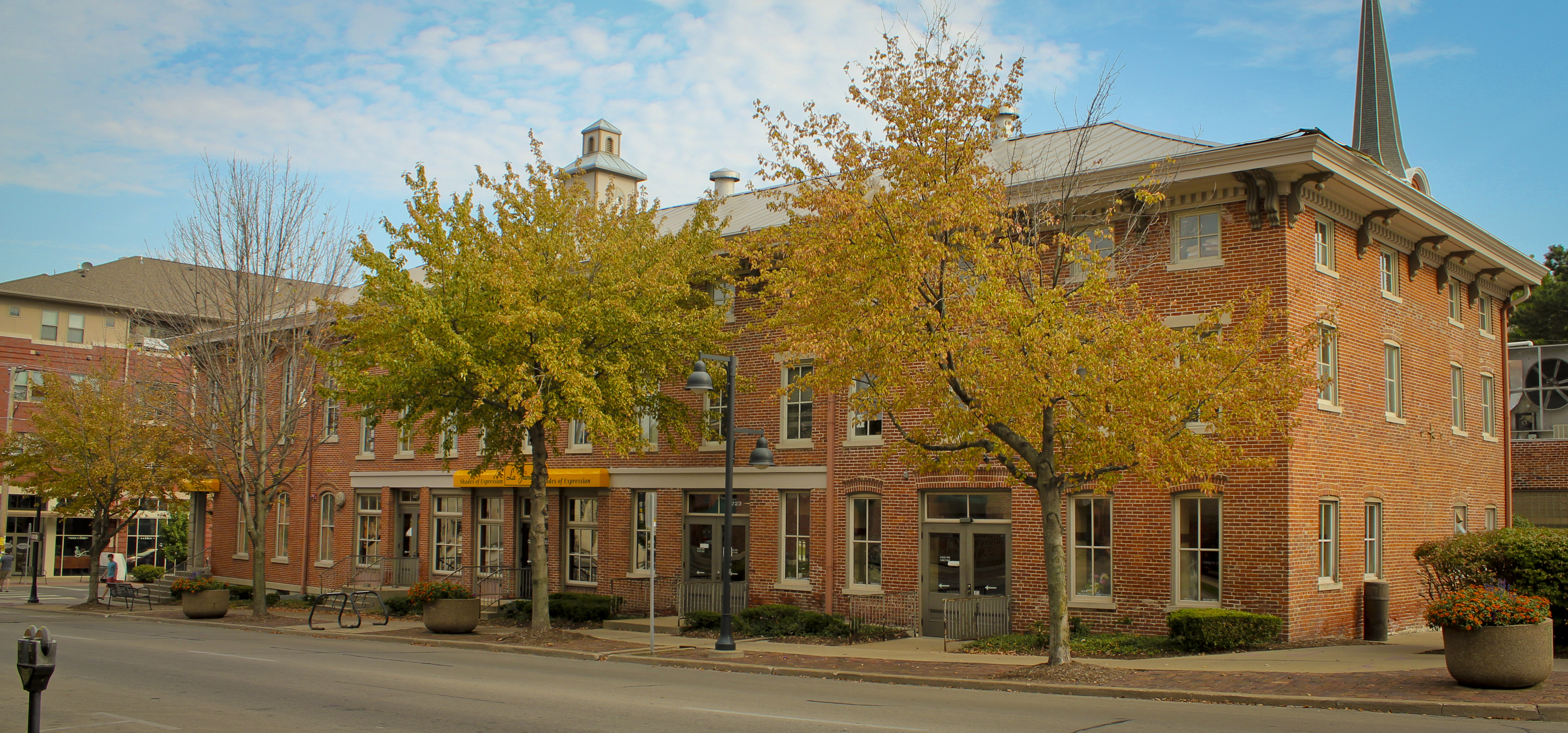

- Location within Iowa Location within the United States
- Location: 127-131 N. Linn and 221-227 E. Market Streets, Iowa City, Iowa
- Coordinates: 41°39′48″N 91°31′54″W
- Built: 1856
- Architectural style: Italianate, vernacular Italianate
- NRHP reference No.: 86000710
- Added to NRHP: April 10, 1986

The Union Brewery is a historic brewery building in Iowa City, Iowa. The brewery was founded in 1856 by German immigrants Anton Geiger and Simeon Hotz. Conrad Graf was the brewery's brewmaster, and its beer was named Graf's Golden Brew after him; Graf later came to own the brewery after Geiger's death. Graf was instrumental in inciting the 1884 Iowa City beer riots, a popular uprising against Iowa's new prohibition law; the rioting mob injured multiple law officers and city attorneys, one of whom successfully sued Graf for $7,000. The brewery continued to operate until Prohibition; during Prohibition, it attempted to produce soda, but residual yeast spores caused the soda to ferment.

A network of tunnels connected the Union Brewery to two other breweries in Iowa City. The tunnels linked cellars and "beer caves" used by the breweries to store their products. The tunnels are well-preserved, and a developer has attempted to reopen them for tours or business use.

The building was added to the National Register of Historic Places on April 10, 1986.
