= Iowa City Sueppel murders =

2008 family annihilation in Iowa City, Iowa

- Location: Iowa City, Iowa, U.S.
- Date: March 23, 2008
- Target: Family
- Attack type: Familicide, mass murder, murder-suicide
- Weapon: Two baseball bats
- Deaths: 6 (including the perpetrator)
- Perpetrator: Steven Sueppel

The Iowa City Sueppel murders were a family annihilation perpetrated by Steven Sueppel, a 42-year-old former banker, at his residence in Iowa City, Iowa, US on Easter Sunday night, March 23, 2008.

On Monday morning at 6:31 a.m., Sueppel called 9-1-1 from his mobile phone, requested that police visit his house immediately, and hung up without identifying himself. When police arrived at his house, they found Sueppel's wife Sheryl and their four adopted children—Ethan (age 10), Seth (age 9), Mira (age 5) and Eleanor (age 3) dead of multiple blunt force trauma injuries to their upper torsos and heads. Police recovered the presumed murder weapons—two baseball bats—at the scene of the crime. At 6:36 a.m., five minutes after his 9-1-1 call, Steven Sueppel committed suicide by driving the family minivan into a concrete abutment on Interstate 80 at high speed, causing his vehicle to burst into flames.

== Details ==
In February 2008 (one month before the murders), Steven Sueppel was indicted by a federal grand jury on charges of embezzlement and money laundering in connection with $559,040 stolen from his former employer, the Hills Bank and Trust Company of Hills, Iowa, where he had served as a vice president and controller. Sueppel had pleaded not guilty, but had indicated to investigators that he had in fact diverted the funds to a personal account. At the time of the murders, Sueppel was out on bond and awaiting an April 2008 trial.

Starting at about 11:30 p.m. on the evening of the murders, Sueppel left a series of apologetic voicemail messages for former co-workers and relatives. He also left a handwritten note in his own kitchen; in it, he wrote that he had killed his wife and children.

On March 29, 2008, St. Mary's Church in Iowa City, where the Sueppel family had attended services the day before the familicide, held a Catholic funeral mass for all six members of the Sueppel family. The church's decision to grant Steven Sueppel, a presumed multiple murderer, a Catholic funeral generated controversy among Iowa City-area Catholics and Catholic scholars.

== Timeline of murders ==
Sunday a.m.: The Sueppel family attends Easter Mass at St. Mary's Catholic Church. Steven's and Sheryl's parents are also at the Mass and later said they did not notice anything unusual about anyone's behavior.

Sunday, 8:00 p.m.: A family friend stops by at the Sueppels' home and visits with Steven. The friend saw one of the children, but noted nothing unusual.

Sunday, 11:30 p.m.: Steven Sueppel leaves a message for his father and brother at their law firm. In the message, he states that his family is in heaven. It is believed that his wife had been killed by now, although the children were likely still alive.

Sunday, 11:30 p.m.—Monday 3:45 a.m.: At some point, according to a letter Steven wrote, he allegedly gathers his four children into the family van which was parked in the garage and tries to kill the children and himself by carbon monoxide poisoning. When this doesn't work, Steven ushers the children back into the house and bludgeons them to death. The three oldest children were found in their bedrooms. Eleanor, the youngest was found downstairs in the toy room.

Monday, 3:45 a.m.: Steven leaves a message at the office of his former employer. Details of this message were not released.

Monday, 3:50 a.m.: Steven leaves a message on his home answering machine expressing his regret.

Monday, 4:01 a.m.: Steven leaves a second message on his home answering machine. In the message, he indicates that he tried to drown himself in the Iowa River at Lower City Park but he "kept floating".

Monday, 6:31 a.m.: 9-1-1 dispatchers receive a call directing them to the home of Steven and Sheryl Sueppel and telling them to "go there immediately". The call came from Steven Sueppel's mobile phone and the caller immediately disconnects without identifying himself.

9-1-1 Transcript:
Dispatch: This is 9-1-1. Location of your emergency? Hello?
Caller: Am I talking to Iowa City?
Dispatch: No this is ... Where, what is the location of your emergency?
Caller: Iowa City, Iowa.
Dispatch: What's the address?
Caller: 629 Barrington Road. Please go there immediately.
Dispatch: What's going on there?
Caller hangs up.

Monday, 6:36 a.m.: Sueppel dies in a fiery crash on Interstate 80, outside Iowa City. Witnesses indicate that the driver was driving at high speed and seemed to have deliberately crashed into a concrete pillar.

== Suspect ==
Sueppel was born on August 13, 1965, the son of William and Patricia Tierney Sueppel. He graduated from Regina High School and the University of Northern Iowa. The Sueppel family were members of St. Mary's Catholic Church, and Steven married Sheryl Kesterson there on June 13, 1990. During their marriage, the couple had no biological children, but instead adopted four South Korean children: Ethan, Seth, Mira, and Eleanor. The family attended services at St. Mary's every week, and had been present at the church's Easter mass on Sunday, March 23, 2008.

== Aftermath ==
In the days after, there was some controversy over the inclusion of Sueppel in the Catholic funeral for his wife and children. Factoring in were differing accounts of possible mental illness both independent of and related to Sueppel committing familicide. In August 2008, Hills Bank and Trust filed court documents demanding payment from Sueppel's estate for the allegedly embezzled funds and for $32,673 in outstanding loans.

== In media ==
The murders were featured in the tv show, “Deadliest Mums and Dads” in season 2, episode 2.
