= Saint Patrick's Church (Iowa City, Iowa) =

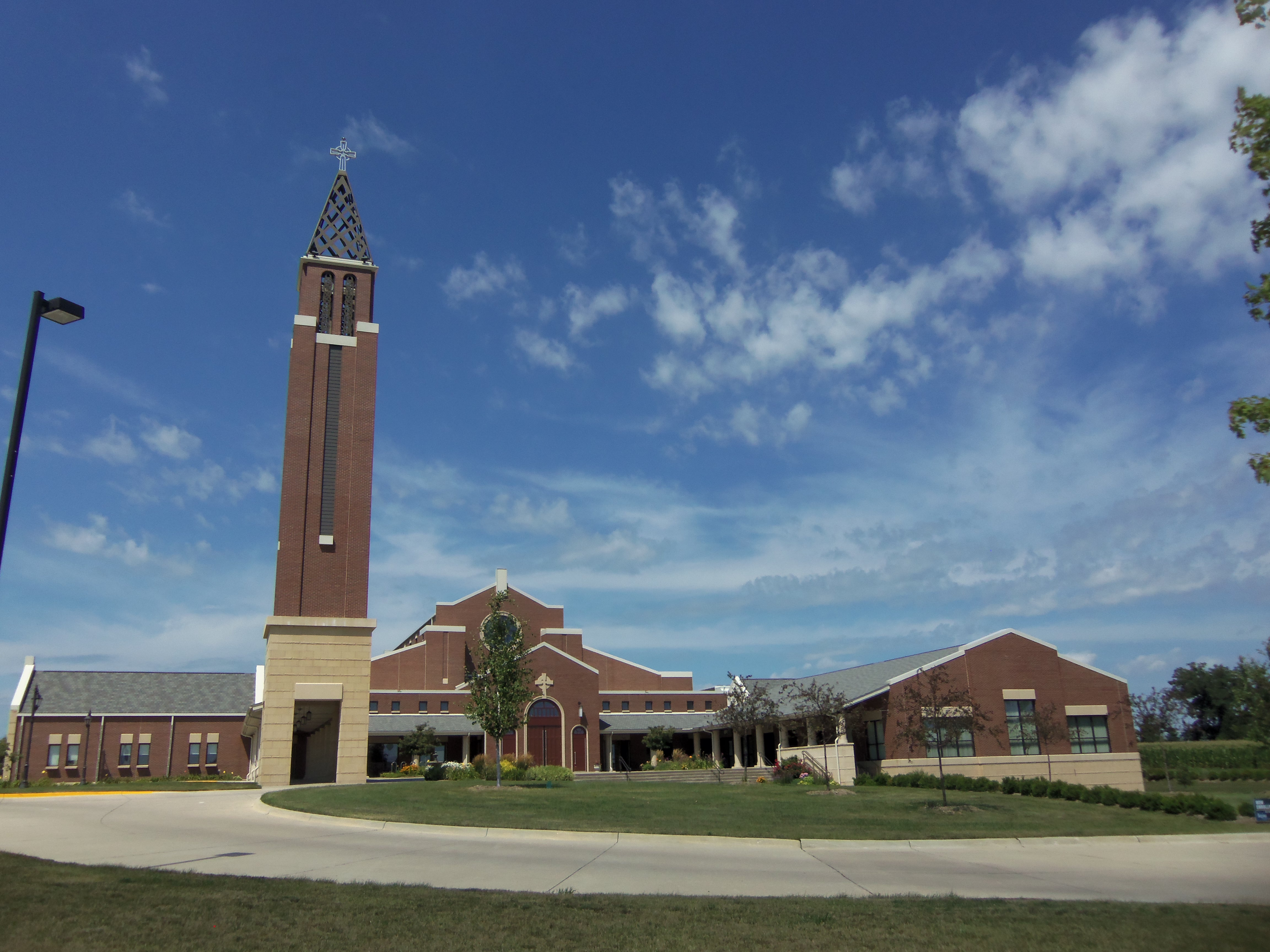

- Location in Iowa Saint Patrick's Church (the United States)
- 41°39′55″N 91°28′18″W
- Location: 4330 St. Patrick Dr. Iowa City, Iowa
- Country: United States
- Denomination: Roman Catholic
- Website: www.stpatsic.com

History
- Founded: 1873
- Dedication: St. Patrick

Architecture
- Groundbreaking: 2008
- Completed: 2009

Specifications
- Materials: Brick

Administration
- Diocese: Davenport

Clergy
- Bishop: Most Rev. Dennis G. Walsh
- Pastor: Rev. Troy Richmond

Saint Patrick's Church is a Catholic parish located at 4330 St. Patrick Drive in Iowa City, Iowa. The church is part of the Diocese of Davenport. The parish was formerly located at 228 East Court Street, near downtown Iowa City, before its church building was destroyed by a tornado in 2006.

== History ==
St. Patrick's is the second parish founded in Iowa City after St. Mary's, which was established in 1841. The Rev. M. V. Rice celebrated the first mass for St. Patrick's parish in the former Trinity Episcopal Church on March 23, 1873. The building was on Dubuque Street, near Burlington, and had been remodeled for the parish's use. The parish's long-time home at Court and Linn Streets was obtained on August 31, 1876. The cornerstone for the new church was laid on June 13, 1878. Although incomplete, the first Mass in the new church was celebrated on February 2, 1879. The Gothic Revival building was built for $18,000. The rectory was built in 1908, and a convent for the Sisters of Charity of the Blessed Virgin Mary was built in 1910. Bishop Davis formally dedicated the church on January 29, 1916.

Classes for the parish school were held in various locations until the cornerstone for its first school building was laid on March 14, 1885. The building was doubled in size in 1896. A new combination grade school and high school building was opened in 1922. In the 1950s Bishop Hayes requested that the Iowa City parishes plan for a new central high school to replace those at St. Mary's and St. Patrick's. The result, Regina High School, was built on Rochester Avenue and dedicated on August 31, 1958. In the fall of 1968 the Catholic grade schools were merged and formed the Iowa City Catholic Grade School in the St. Patrick's school building. The sisters moved into the St. Mary's convent. In 1972 the 7th and 8th grades were moved to Regina, and the remaining grades moved in the 1990s.

== 2006 tornado ==
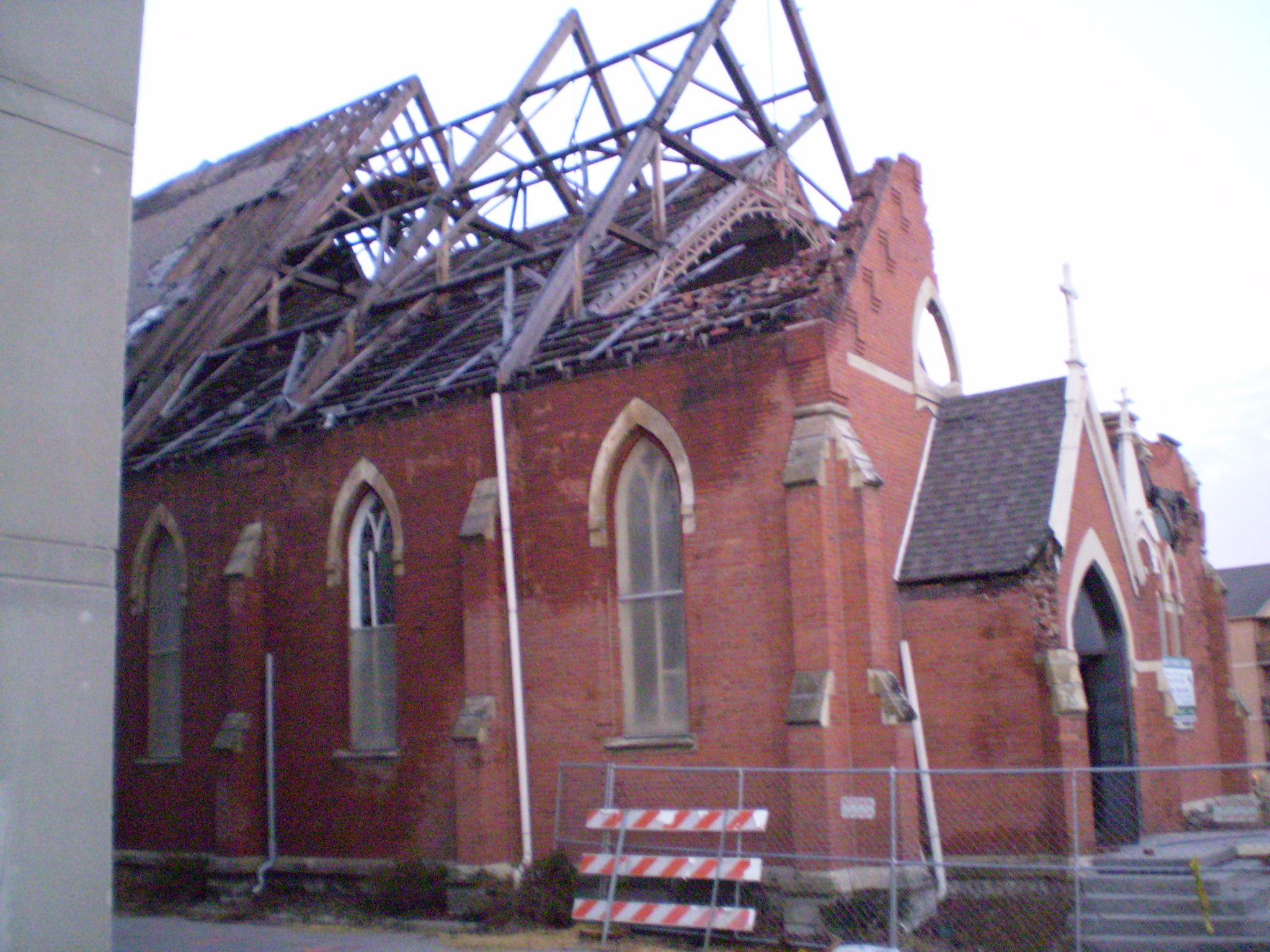
St. Patrick's Church after it was struck by a tornado

On April 13, 2006, the Iowa City area was hit by an F2 tornado. During the course of the storm, St. Patrick's Church was heavily damaged. Most of the roof of the church building was torn off during the storm, and the 80-foot steeple was knocked over as well. The adjoining rectory also sustained damage. As Holy Thursday services had taken place on this date, there were people present at St. Patrick's during the storm. The Mass of the Lord's Supper had finished just before the storm. People took shelter in the basement of the rectory. No one at the church at the time was injured or killed.

Because of the storm, Mass for the remainder of Holy Week and Easter were held at Regina High School. The pastor, Rev. Rudolph Juarez stated at the time that the current church building was probably a total loss. He was not yet sure what form the new parish buildings would take, but Juarez said that the parish would rebuild.

In September 2006, it was announced that St. Patrick's Church would be moved to the east side of Iowa City. The plans were to build a much larger church with a capacity of 1000 people (the old church could hold 300). On December 26, 2006, the rectory was torn down by Peterson Contractors Inc. of Reinbeck. The 130-year-old church building was torn down as well after asbestos removal delayed the demolition. The construction of the new parish church was completed in November 2009, with a dedication ceremony held on November 29, 2009.

== See also ==
- Easter Week 2006 tornado outbreak sequence
