= Easter Week 2006 tornado outbreak sequence =

Weather event in the United States

Easter Week 2006 Tornado Outbreak Sequence
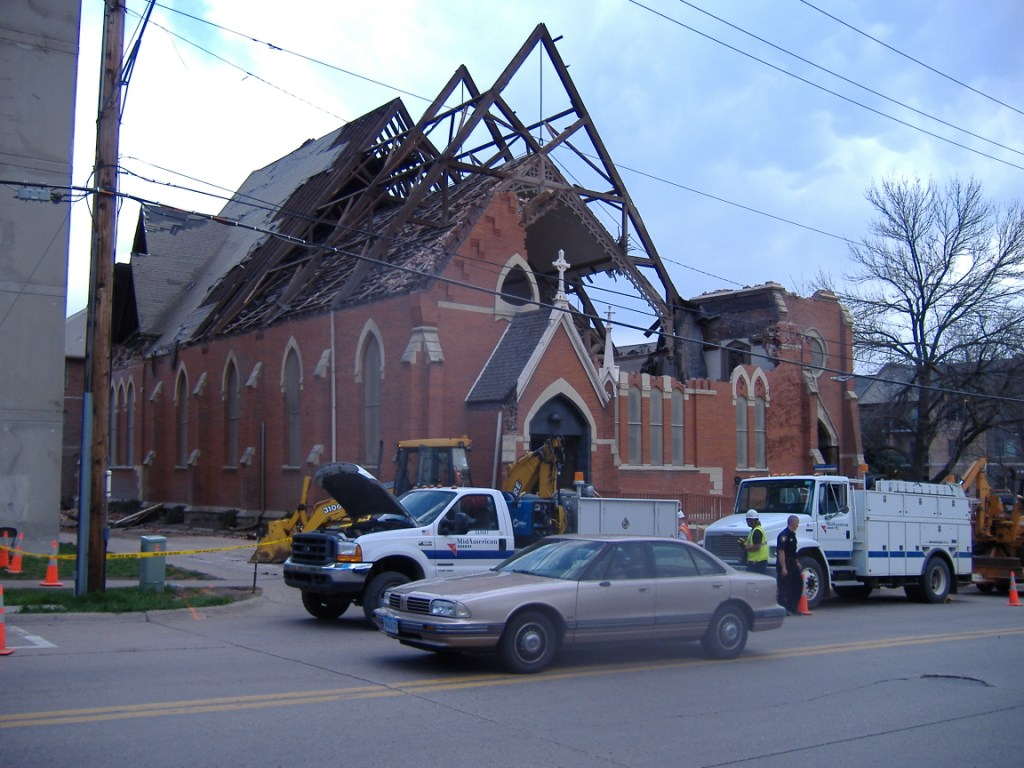
- Damage to Saint Patrick's Church in Iowa City

Meteorological history
- Duration: April 13–18, 2006

Tornado outbreak
- Tornadoes: 54 confirmed
- Max. rating: F2 tornado
- Duration: 4 days, 4 hours, 19 minutes

Overall effects
- Casualties: 1 fatality, 34 injuries
- Damage: $23.952 million (2006 USD) $25.61 million (2008 USD)
- Areas affected: Midwest, North Carolina

The Easter Week 2006 tornado outbreak sequence was a tornado outbreak sequence during the days leading up to Easter, continuing into the week after the holiday. It was the third major outbreak of April 2006, which had been an unusually busy month for tornado activity.

== Meteorological synopsis ==
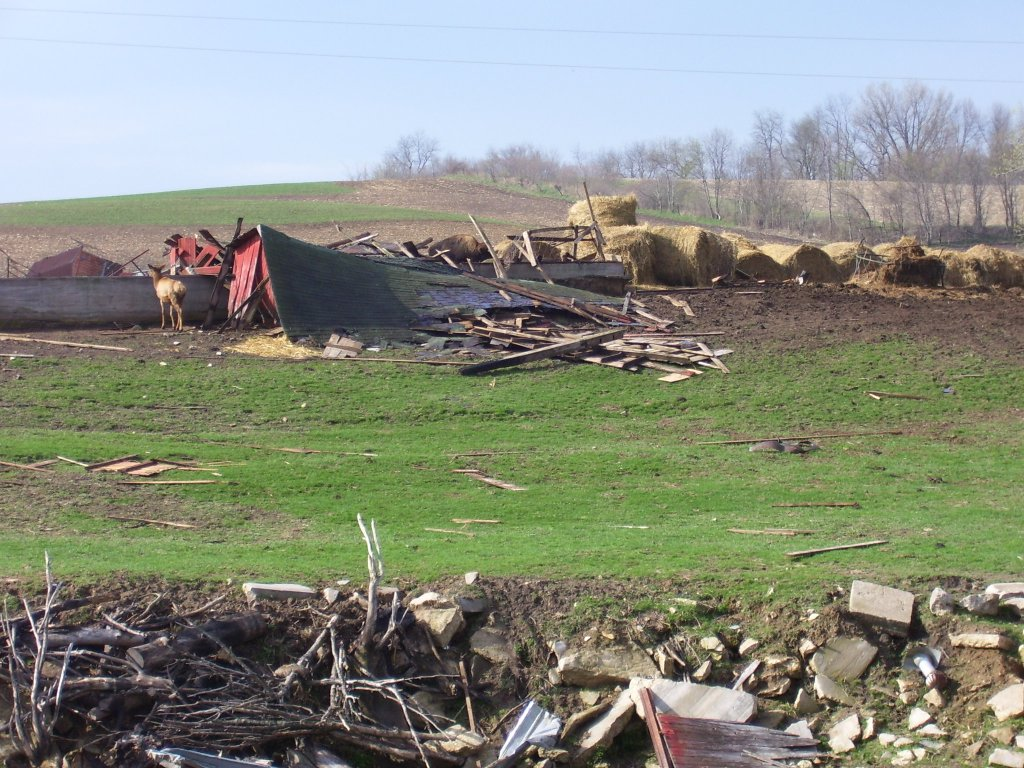
F1 damage to a farm near Anamosa, Iowa.

On April 13, a complex of severe thunderstorms formed in eastern Iowa, bringing many reports of large hail along with unexpected reports of strong tornadoes, some with debris. The worst impacts were felt in the Iowa City area, where significant damage and numerous injuries were reported, in addition to at least one death across the region.

Another supercell developed on April 14 across western Indiana, producing a few tornadoes; although, nothing very serious was actually reported. That system moved eastward over the Mid-Atlantic States on April 15, but no tornadoes were reported there.

While the first system moved eastward, a second system developed over the Upper Midwest and tracked across the Midwest between April 15 and 16. This new system produced 40 reported tornadoes, several of which have been damaging; however, no fatalities were reported from the second system.

That system then tracked into the Mid-Atlantic on April 17 and was mostly a straight-line wind event, even though there were a handful of new tornadoes reported across the region.

A third system developed on April 18 and brought even more severe weather, this time farther south in the lower Midwest, primarily in Missouri. There were several more tornadoes reported from this one.

The severe weather activity finally ended on April 19 across the South.

The back side of this system produced heavy snow and blizzard conditions over the High Plains.

== Reported tornadoes ==
Confirmed tornadoes by Fujita rating
| FU | F0 | F1 | F2 | F3 | F4 | F5 | Total |
|---|---|---|---|---|---|---|---|
| 0 | 30 | 18 | 6 | 0 | 0 | 0 | 54 |

=== April 13 event ===
List of reported tornadoes - Thursday, April 13, 2006
| F# | Location | County | Coord. | Time (UTC) | Path length | Damage |
|---|---|---|---|---|---|---|
Iowa
| F0 | NE of Toledo | Tama | 42.05°N 92.52°W | 0010 | 0.1 miles (0.2 km) | Brief tornado remained over open fields with no damage. |
| F0 | N of Marion | Linn | 42.1°N 91.6°W | 0040 | 1 mile (1.6 km) | A recreational trailer was destroyed, with some farm outbuilding roofs and trees damaged. A couple of concrete walls were collapsed, and a cattle shed collapsed as well, killing some cattle. |
| F0 | SE of Van Horne | Benton | 41.98°N 92.05°W | 0050 | 4.8 miles (7.7 km) | Tornado snapped four power poles and damaged fences. |
| F1 | SW of Anamosa | Jones | 42.08°N 91.33°W | 0115 | 3.7 miles (6.0 km) | A mobile home was completely destroyed, injuring one person. Garages and barns were destroyed, and homes sustained roof and wall damage. |
| F1 | SSW of Sharon Center | Johnson | 41.55°N 91.68°W | 0116 | 3.6 miles (5.8 km) | Tornado damaged trees and outbuildings. |
| F2 | Iowa City | Johnson | 41.67°N 91.55°W | 0129 | 4.5 miles (7.2 km) | see section on this tornado |
| F1 | NE of Hills (1st tornado) | Johnson | 41.6°N 91.48°W | 0138 | 5.1 miles (8.2 km) | A mobile home was destroyed and a house lost a portion of its roof. Considerable tree damage was noted and several farm outbuildings were damaged or unroofed. |
| F1 | SE of Lone Tree to NE of Nichols | Johnson, Muscatine | 41.43°N 91.38°W | 0145 | 9.4 miles (15.1 km) | 1 Death - Damage near Lone Tree was limited to trees. Near Nichols, the tornado destroyed a mobile home, resulting in a fatality and one injury. Considerable tree and outbuilding damage occurred, along with some damage to homes and garages. |
| F1 | E of Lone Tree to NE of Nichols | Johnson, Muscatine | 41.48°N 91.38°W | 0148 | 4.8 miles (7.7 km) | Near Lone Tree, an outbuilding was damaged, along with some trees. Near Nichols, a community center was unroofed and a new metal pole barn was destroyed. Tornado followed a path very similar to the previous tornado. |
| F1 | WSW of Muscatine W of Illinois City | Muscatine, Rock Island (IL) | 41.4°N 91.12°W | 0213 | unknown | Trees and outbuildings were damaged along the path. |
| F0 | NE of Hills (2nd tornado) | Johnson | 41.67°N 91.48°W | 0219 | 0.5 miles (0.8 km) | Tornado caused roof damage to a house that had been previously damaged by an F1 tornado 40 minutes earlier. |
| F1 | W of LeClaire | Scott | 41.6°N 90.37°W | 0242 | 1.5 miles (2.4 km) | Unusual tornado formed on the cold side of a front and was initiated by a downburst. A cattle barn was severely damaged, and another sustained minor damage. A machine shed sustained roof damage, a doghouse was flipped onto its roof, and a power pole was knocked over as well. |
Illinois
| F1 | W of Illinois City | Rock Island, Mercer | 41.33°N 90.98°W | 0229 | 13 miles (20.9 km) | Damage confined mainly to trees, with a few outbuildings damaged as well. |
| F1 | NW of Mannon | Mercer | 41.25°N 90.97°W | 0257 | 1.5 miles (2.4 km) | Tornado destroyed a mobile home. |
| F2 | WNW of Matherville | Mercer | 41.27°N 90.62°W | 0307 | 2 miles (3.2 km) | One home sustained roof damage, and another lost its roof entirely. |
| F1 | Alexis | Mercer | 41.05°N 90.55°W | 0312 | 0.8 miles (1.3 km) | A parsonage on the west side of town had 75 percent of its roof torn off with the roof blown onto the house next door. Across the north side of town, several sheds were heavily damaged or destroyed with considerable tree damage. One house had its roof completely torn off with varying roof damage to numerous other houses. Several utility poles were snapped in half. |
| F0 | NNW of Lincoln | Logan | 41.18°N 89.38°W | 0525 | 0.1 miles (0.2 km) | Brief touchdown, no damage reported. |
| F0 | Lincoln area | Logan | 41.15°N 89.37°W | 0527 | 3.8 miles (6.1 km) | Tornado touched down near Lincoln Airport. The tornado damaged roofs, siding and outbuildings, and blew down numerous trees and power lines. In addition, before lifting, the tornado damaged several barns in a rural area to the east of Lincoln. |

=== April 14 event ===
List of reported tornadoes - Friday, April 14, 2006
| F# | Location | County | Coord. | Time (UTC) | Path length | Damage |
|---|---|---|---|---|---|---|
Illinois
| F0 | N of Grand Ridge | LaSalle | 41.25°N 88.83°W | 2333 | 0.5 miles (0.8 km) | Brief touchdown, no damage reported. |
Indiana
| F0 | S of Ambia | Benton | 40.48°N 87.52°W | 2357 | 0.5 miles (0.8 km) | Brief touchdown, no damage reported. |
| F0 | NW of Cairo | Tippecanoe | 40.55°N 86.93°W | 2358 | 3.2 miles (5.1 km) | Brief touchdown, no damage reported. |
| F1 | Americus to W of Radnor | Tippecanoe, Carroll | 40.53°N 86.75°W | 0018 | 2.3 miles (3.7 km) | Damage was confined to farm outbuildings. |
| F1 | E of Burney | Decatur | 39.32°N 85.63°W | 0018 | 0.8 miles (1.3 km) | Tornado destroyed a garage, and damaged several outbuildings. |

=== April 15 event ===
List of reported tornadoes - Saturday, April 15, 2006
| F# | Location | County | Coord. | Time (UTC) | Path length | Damage |
|---|---|---|---|---|---|---|
Nebraska
| F2 | W of Wymore to N of Sterling | Gage, Johnson | 40.13°N 96.78°W | 2133 | 34 miles (54.7 km) | Long-tracked tornado passed near Beatrice and destroyed one home, severely damaged two other homes, and affected 69 others. Outbuildings were destroyed, and tree damage was also noted. |
| F1 | S of Nebraska City | Otoe | 40.48°N 95.85°W | 2333 | 2.5 miles (4.0 km) | Tornado damaged multiple homes. Several trees were also toppled onto vehicles destroying them or causing extensive damage. |
Kansas
| F0 | E of Onaga | Pottawatomie | 39.48°N 96.13°W | 2248 | 0.1 miles (0.2 km) | Brief touchdown, no damage reported. |
| F0 | NE of Circleville to W of Horton | Jackson, Brown | 39.53°N 95.82°W | 2320 | 11 miles (17.7 km) | Tornado damaged a few outbuildings and trees. |
| F0 | NW of Horton | Brown | 39.7°N 95.57°W | 2340 | 1 mile (1.6 km) | Tornado destroyed 2 outbuildings, and caused minor damage to trees and a home. |
| F1 | S of Willis | Brown | 39.7°N 95.5°W | 2344 | 4 miles (6.4 km) | Four well-built outbuildings were destroyed, and several others were damaged. |
| F0 | SSW of Robinson | Brown | 39.78°N 95.43°W | 2352 | 0.1 miles (0.2 km) | Tornado damaged a home and some trees. |
| F0 | N of Denton | Doniphan | 39.77°N 95.27°W | 0003 | 2 miles (3.2 km) | Brief touchdown, no damage reported. |
| F0 | S of Tonganoxie | Leavenworth | 39.07°N 95.08°W | 0105 | 1 mile (1.6 km) | Brief touchdown, no damage reported. |
| F0 | S of Basehor to W of Bonner Springs | Leavenworth, Wyandotte | 39.08°N 94.93°W | 0120 | 4 miles (6.4 km) | Tornado remained over open fields and caused no damage. |
Missouri
| F0 | SSE of Stewartsville | DeKalb | 39.75°N 94.48°W | 0138 | 1.5 miles (2.4 km) | Brief touchdown, no damage reported. |
| F2 | E of Stewartsville | DeKalb | 39.75°N 94.48°W | 0143 | 13 miles (20.9 km) | Two pole barns were destroyed and one home was heavily damaged. |
| F0 | Vibbard area | Ray | 39.38°N 94.15°W | 0215 | 10.1 miles (16.3 km) | One home had its roof blown off, and tree and power line damage occurred. |
Iowa
| F0 | SW of Audubon | Audubon | 41.7°N 94.97°W | 0143 | 0.2 miles (0.3 km) | Brief touchdown, no damage reported. |

=== April 16 event ===
List of reported tornadoes - Sunday, April 16, 2006
| F# | Location | County | Coord. | Time (UTC) | Path length | Damage |
|---|---|---|---|---|---|---|
Illinois
| F1 | SW of Warrensburg | Macon | 39.92°N 89.1°W | 1935 | 1 mile (1.6 km) | Tornado destroyed an outbuildings and caused roof and siding damage to a home. |
| F0 | E of Taylorville | Christian | 39.55°N 89.22°W | 1953 | 0.1 miles (0.2 km) | Brief touchdown, no damage reported. |
| F0 | SSE of Assumption | Christian | 39.48°N 89.03°W | 2005 | 0.1 miles (0.2 km) | Brief touchdown, no damage reported. |
| F0 | SE of Stonington | Christian | 39.58°N 89.13°W | 2007 | 0.1 miles (0.2 km) | Brief touchdown, no damage reported. |
| F0 | E of Piper City | Ford | 40.75°N 88.15°W | 2157 | 0.5 miles (0.8 km) | A tool shed was knocked over. |
| F2 | SW of Dieterich | Effingham | 39.02°N 88.43°W | 2209 | 4 miles (6.4 km) | Several homes were damaged, two of which had their attached garages destroyed. Numerous trees were snapped, barns and outbuildings were destroyed, and a combine was flipped into a pond. An antenna tower was knocked down, and grain bins were destroyed as well. |
| F1 | S of Humboldt | Coles | 39.58°N 88.32°W | 2215 | 5 miles (8.0 km) | Two outbuildings were damaged. |
| F2 | SW of Wheeler | Jasper | 39.03°N 88.35°W | 2218 | 1.5 miles (2.4 km) | A mobile home was completely destroyed, with debris scattered hundreds of yards into a field. A refrigerator from the home was found a quarter-mile away. Extensive tree damage occurred, and a car was moved 15 feet. Other homes and outbuildings sustained minor damage. |
| F0 | E of Humboldt | Coles | 39.6°N 88.22°W | 2225 | 1 mile (1.6 km) | Brief touchdown, no damage reported. |
| F0 | S of Ashkum | Iroquois | 40.83°N 87.95°W | 2241 | 0.5 miles (0.8 km) | Brief touchdown, no damage reported. |
| F0 | SW of Robinson | Crawford | 38.95°N 87.8°W | 2309 | 0.1 miles (0.2 km) | Brief touchdown, no damage reported. |
| F0 | NW of Martinton | Iroquois | 40.93°N 87.75°W | 2320 | 0.5 miles (0.8 km) | Brief touchdown, no damage reported. |
| F0 | NW of Beaverville | Iroquois | 40.98°N 87.68°W | 2356 | 0.5 miles (0.8 km) | Brief touchdown, no damage reported. |
| F1 | Robinson area | Crawford | 39.0°N 87.73°W | 0006 | 0.1 miles (0.2 km) | Tornado destroyed a garage, caused significant tree damage, flattened a highway sign, and caused siding and roof damage to another home and two churches. |

=== April 17 event ===
List of reported tornadoes - Monday, April 17, 2006
| F# | Location | County | Coord. | Time (UTC) | Path length | Damage |
|---|---|---|---|---|---|---|
North Carolina
| F1 | N of Whiteville | Columbus | 34.35°N 78.7°W | 2105 | 1 mile (1.6 km) | Numerous trees and power lines were downed, some of which fell on and damaged a mobile home. |
| F0 | SW of Jacksonville | Onslow | 34.7°N 77.48°W | 2130 | 0.5 miles (0.8 km) | Tornado touched down over the New River, affecting several boaters. |

=== April 18 event ===
List of reported tornadoes - Tuesday, April 18, 2006
| F# | Location | County | Coord. | Time (UTC) | Path length | Damage |
|---|---|---|---|---|---|---|
Illinois
| F0 | W of Lincoln | Logan | 40.15°N 89.4°W | 0419 | 0.1 miles (0.2 km) | Tornado crossed I-55, flipping two semi-trucks and injuring the two drivers. |

=== Iowa City, Iowa ===
Iowa City, Iowa
- The tornado while it was on the ground

Meteorological history
- Date: April 13, 2006
- Formed: April 13, 2006, 8:29 p.m. CDT (UTC–05:00)
- Dissipated: April 13, 2006, 8:37 p.m. CDT (UTC–05:00)
- Duration: 8 minutes

F2 tornado
- on the Fujita scale
- Highest winds: 155 mph (249 km/h)

Overall effects
- Injuries: 30
- Damage: $12 million (2006 USD)

View of damage in downtown Iowa City

The most well-known tornado of the outbreak was a destructive high-end F2 that tore directly through downtown Iowa City shortly after dark. The tornado touched down at the southwest edge of town and moved northeast, downing power lines and striking the Sheriff's Office. The tornado then struck the University of Iowa campus, heavily damaging multiple buildings and temporarily trapping several students. The motor pool headquarters was a total loss. Just off campus, the Alpha Chi Omega sorority house was also severely damaged, and had to be evacuated following the event. As the tornado struck the downtown area, multiple historic brick buildings sustained collapse of walls or had their roofs torn off. Saint Patrick's Church was heavily damaged by the tornado. Just before the tornado hit, Reverend Rudolph Juarez ushered 50 to 75 parishioners (many elderly) to the safety of the rectory basement next door. This likely saved many lives, as the tornado tore off the roof of the church and collapsed the top portion of the brick facade and the steeple into the main congregation area. Residential sections of the city also sustained major damage, as many trees and power lines were downed, and 1,016 homes and apartment buildings were damaged. Upper portions of exterior walls failed at some of these residences. Elsewhere, a 53-year-old Dairy Queen was destroyed, multiple vehicles were flipped, a Wal-Mart sustained roof damage, and a gas station awning was blown over. Three automobile dealerships were also damaged; one dealership had 200 vehicles damaged, a second had 60-70 vehicles damaged, and a third had nearly every vehicle sustaining some type of damage. A total of 35 businesses were damaged or destroyed. The tornado dissipated as it exited at the northeast side of town.

The tornado struck on a Thursday night, which is normally a busy time for the bars of downtown Iowa City. Fortunately, the tornado struck relatively early in the evening, and downtown was not as packed as it might have been had the tornado struck a few hours later. There were a few reports of looting, mainly at establishments where liquor was sold/stored. The Iowa National Guard was called in to restore order and assist with debris cleanup. Electricity was cut to about 7,000 customers in the area, but most power was quickly restored after the tornado. This was the only known tornado to have struck downtown Iowa City. Overall, 30 people were injured in the event.

== Impact ==
UI President David Skorton canceled classes as a result of the tornado. on Friday, April 14. On Friday, area governments declared a joint state of emergency for Johnson County The Daily Iowan (the University newspaper) continued coverage through the weekend, days on which the newspaper does not traditionally print.

== See also ==
- List of North American tornadoes and tornado outbreaks
- Tornadoes of 2006
