= St. Mary's Church and Rectory (Iowa City, Iowa) =

- U.S. National Register of Historic Places
- U.S. Historic district – Contributing property
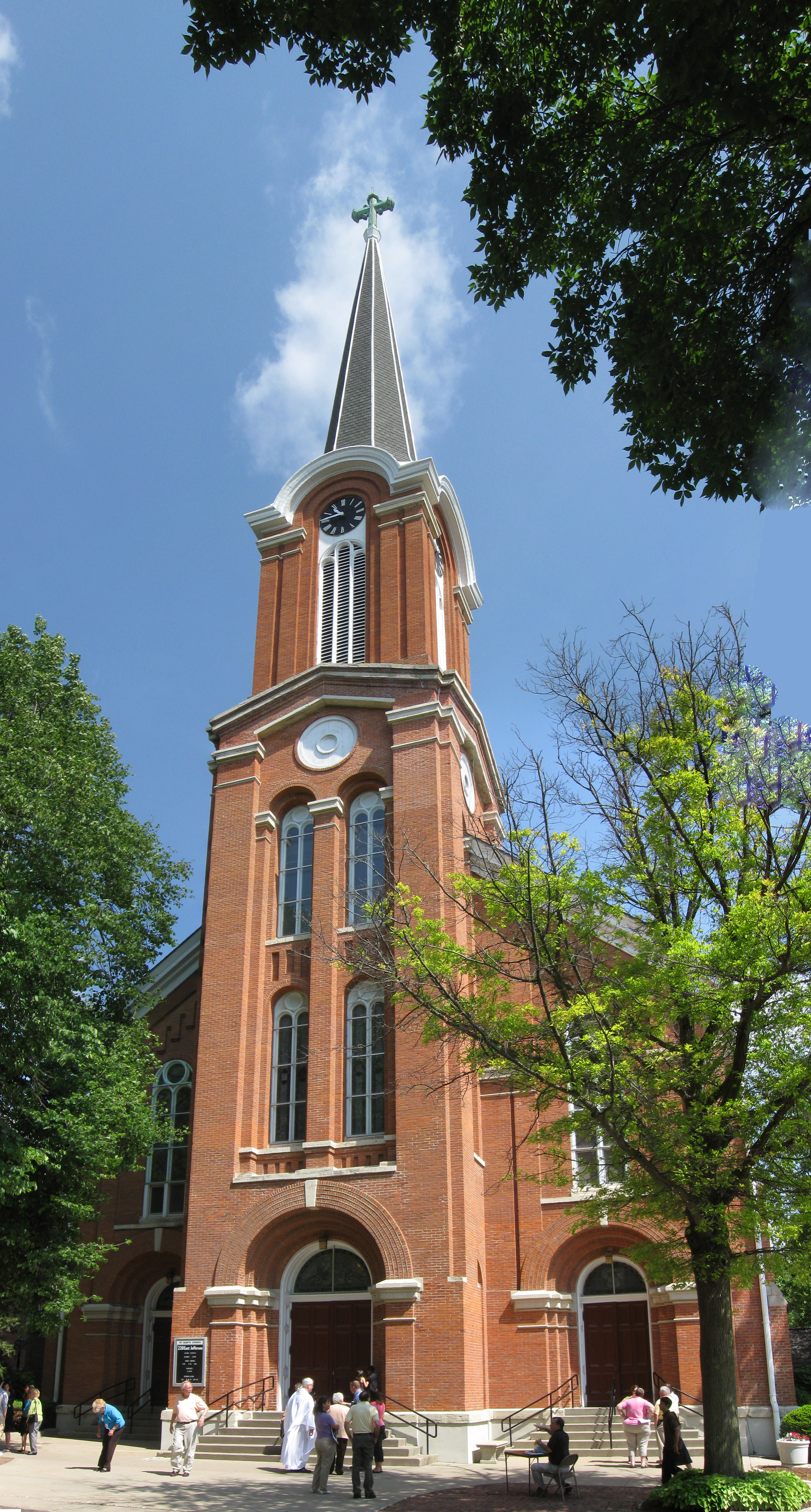

- Location within Iowa Location within the United States
- Location: 220 E. Jefferson St. Iowa City, Iowa
- Coordinates: 41°39′46″N 91°31′54″W
- Area: approximately 1 acre (0.40 ha)
- Built: 1867
- Built by: Hugh Gilles; A. Groebel; J.J. Hotz
- Part of: Jefferson Street Historic District (ID04001097)
- NRHP reference No.: 80001454
- Added to NRHP: February 8, 1980

St. Mary's Catholic Church, also known as St. Mary of the Visitation Church, is a parish church of the Diocese of Davenport which is located in Iowa City, Iowa, United States. The church building and rectory were listed together on the National Register of Historic Places in 1980. They were both included as contributing properties in the Jefferson Street Historic District in 2004. The parish's first rectory, which is now a private home, is also listed on the National Register as St. Mary's Rectory. It is located a few blocks to the east of the present church location at 610 E. Jefferson St.

== History ==
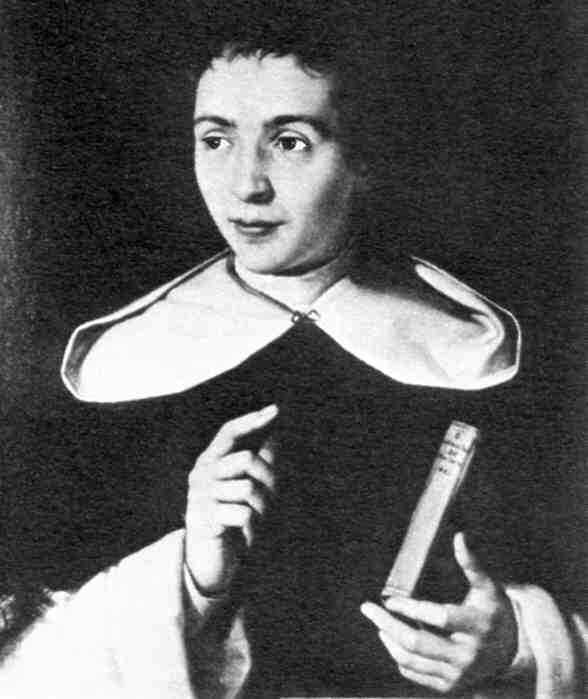
Rev. Samuel Charles Mazzuchelli, OP

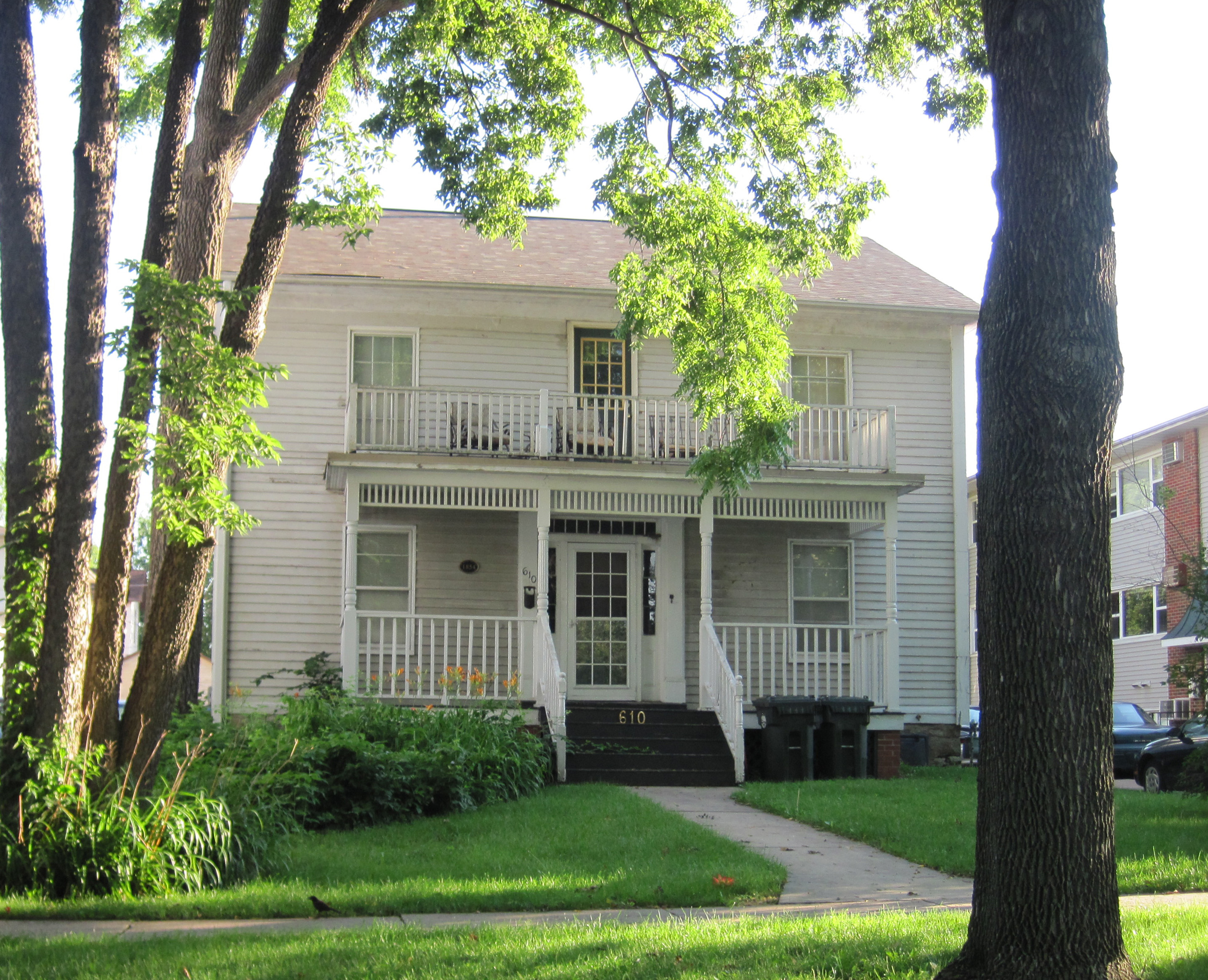
Original rectory

The first Mass in what is now Iowa City was celebrated by a frontier missionary, the Rev. Samuel Charles Mazzuchelli, OP, on December 20, 1840. It was attended by 28 people in a building that doubled as a private home and a hotel owned by Fred Haberstroh. The University of Iowa’s School of Business is currently on that location. The previous day, Mazzuchelli had arrived from St. Paul's Church in Burlington and bought two lots for $2,000 on which the church and rectory stand today.

St Mary's parish was established by Mazzuchelli in 1841, and he designed a small frame building that would serve as a church. The cornerstone for the Greek Revival structure was laid on July 12, 1841, by Bishop Mathias Loras of Dubuque. The building, named St. Mary of the Assumption, was largely completed by 1842. Several priests, including the Rev. J.A.M. Pelamourgues from St. Anthony's in Davenport celebrated Mass in the new church. In 1844 the parish had grown to about 70 families and the Rev. Anthony Godfert was assigned the parish's first pastor.

A year later he established St. Joseph Cemetery to the northeast of the city. Godfert left the parish in 1846 and the parish was served by visiting clergy again for the next two years. Father Pelamourgues came again, as did J.G. Perodin, Joseph Cretin, and John Alleman. In 1848 the Rev. F.B. Poyet was named pastor and the parish has not been without a pastor since then. In the 1850s the parish's first choir was organized and a gallery was added to the interior of the church. The original rectory was built during the pastorate of the Rev. Mathias Hannon in 1853. When Hannon arrived in 1852, the foreign-born Catholic population in Iowa City was growing, especially the Germans and the Bohemians. In 1862 St. Francis Xavier Church was established for the pastoral care of Bohemian immigrants. That church burned to the ground in 1869 and the parishioners returned to St. Mary's.

The Rev. William Emonds became the pastor in 1858. During his pastorate of 32 years saw the expansion of Catholic education and the building of the present church. He also served more than the Iowa City parish. He is credited with establishing 44 parishes, and he built churches in many of them.

Initially, Father Emonds extended the original church to the north for more space, but it became obvious a new church was needed. The cornerstone for the present church was laid on October 27, 1867. Hugh Gilles of Dubuque, Iowa and A. Groebel of Chicago were contracted to build the new church. The new building was built over the old church as the parish continued to worship there. When the new building's roof was completed the old structure was torn down. It took two years to build the church, although the tall spire would be completed at a later date. By the time it was dedicated the main altar, pews, pulpit, and stained glass windows were in place. The new church was dedicated by Bishop John Hennessey of Dubuque on August 15, 1869, as St. Mary of the Visitation Church. It was the first consecrated church in the Diocese of Dubuque. The construction costs of the new church were $75,000. The tower was completed in 1873 and the spire and cross were added in 1874. A 17-bell carillon was added to the tower in 1885.

St. Mary's parish was divided when other parishes were established in Iowa City. St. Patrick's was founded in 1872 and their church was built a few blocks south of St. Mary's in 1879. Another parish to serve the Bohemian community was established in 1891 when St. Wenceslaus was founded. St. Thomas More was founded in 1944 as the Newman Center before it became an independent parish.

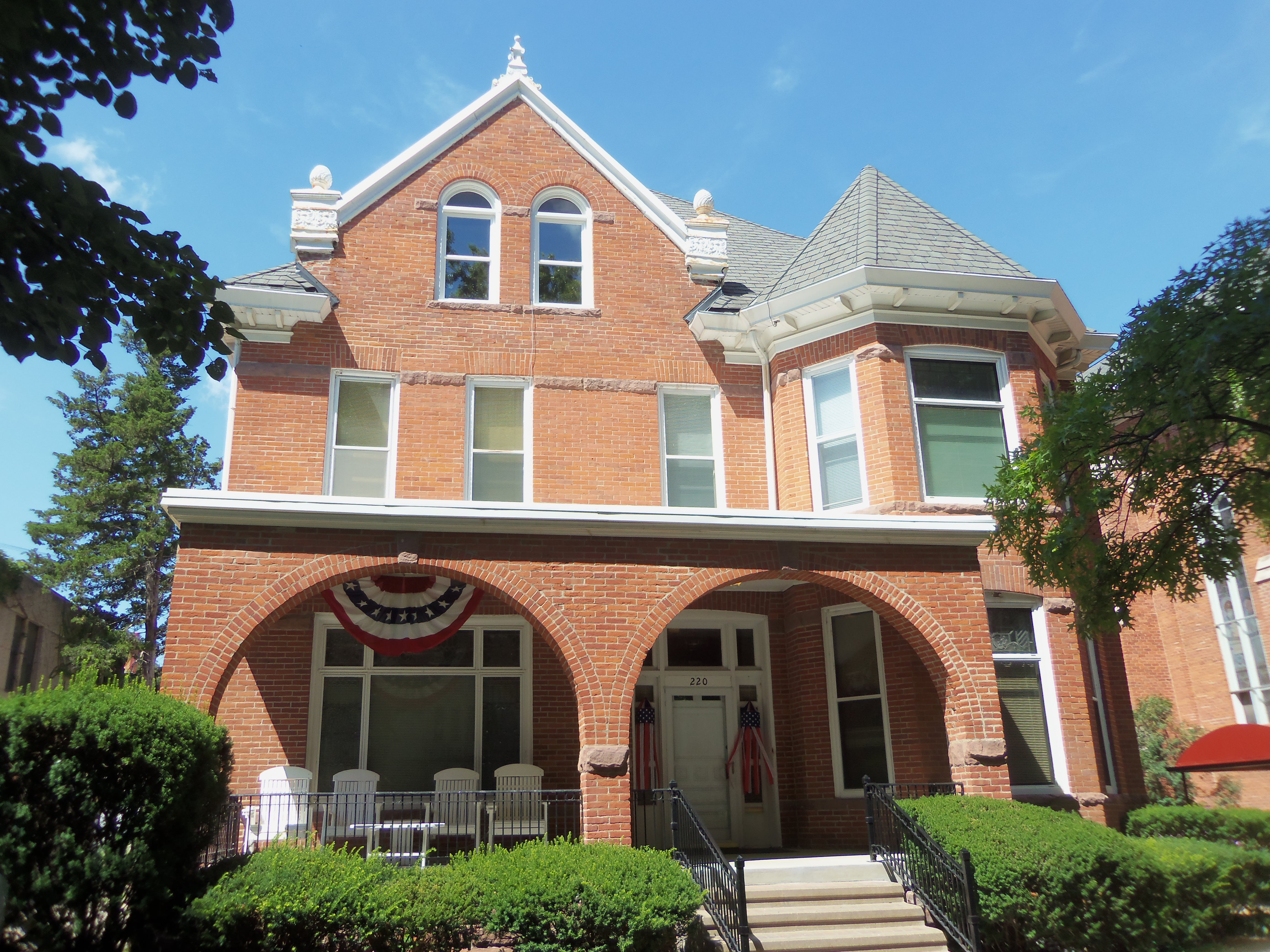
The current Rectory

The parish became a part of the Diocese of Davenport when it was established in 1881. The parish's rectory was moved four blocks to the east in 1891 by the Rev. John F. Kempker and the following year the present rectory was built during the pastorate of Msgr. A.J. Schulte, who would serve the parish for nearly 50 years. The rectory was designed to match the church, and was built for $8,000.

Renovations were done to the church building in 1908 under Msgr. Schulte. The work included sixteen buttresses to strengthen the building, a new cross and spire were built, a basement was dug below the church, and the church interior was redecorated. A local builder and parishioner J.J. Hotz did the buttressing. The church was once again redecorated for the parish centennial in 1941 during the pastorate of Msgr. Carl Meinberg. The present pews were added at that time. Liturgical changes were made after the Second Vatican Council during the pastorate of the Rev. John Morrissey. Changes included a new altar so the priest could face the congregation. Masses were now celebrated in English rather than Latin. Another renovation of the church occurred in the early 1980s under the leadership of the Rev. Henry Griener. The pipe organ was rebuilt in 1981. A parish hall was built in the basement of the church in 1982, and the church interior was redecorated in 1983. The church renovation included removal of the communion rail, new carpet, reconciliation rooms, altar, ambo and chairs. The tabernacle was moved from the high altar to a side altar. Another redecorating project occurred around 2000 by the Rev. Kenneth Kunz, which included moving the baptismal font near the front door and new carpeting.

The parish council was initiated by Father Morrissey in 1969. From 1971 to 1980, Father Morrissey and the Rev. Carlos Leveling served the parish as co-pastors. In 1986 the concept of sacrificial giving was introduced to the parish and it started the practice of tithing a percentage of the parish income. About the same time, the parish offices were moved out of the rectory to a house just east of the church. In 1988 the church tower was reconstructed. Another house was added to the parish offices and the two buildings were renovated for expanded office space by the Rev. Thomas Doyle in 1992. At the same time, the parish hired its first youth minister. Today, approximately 1,700 families belong to the parish.

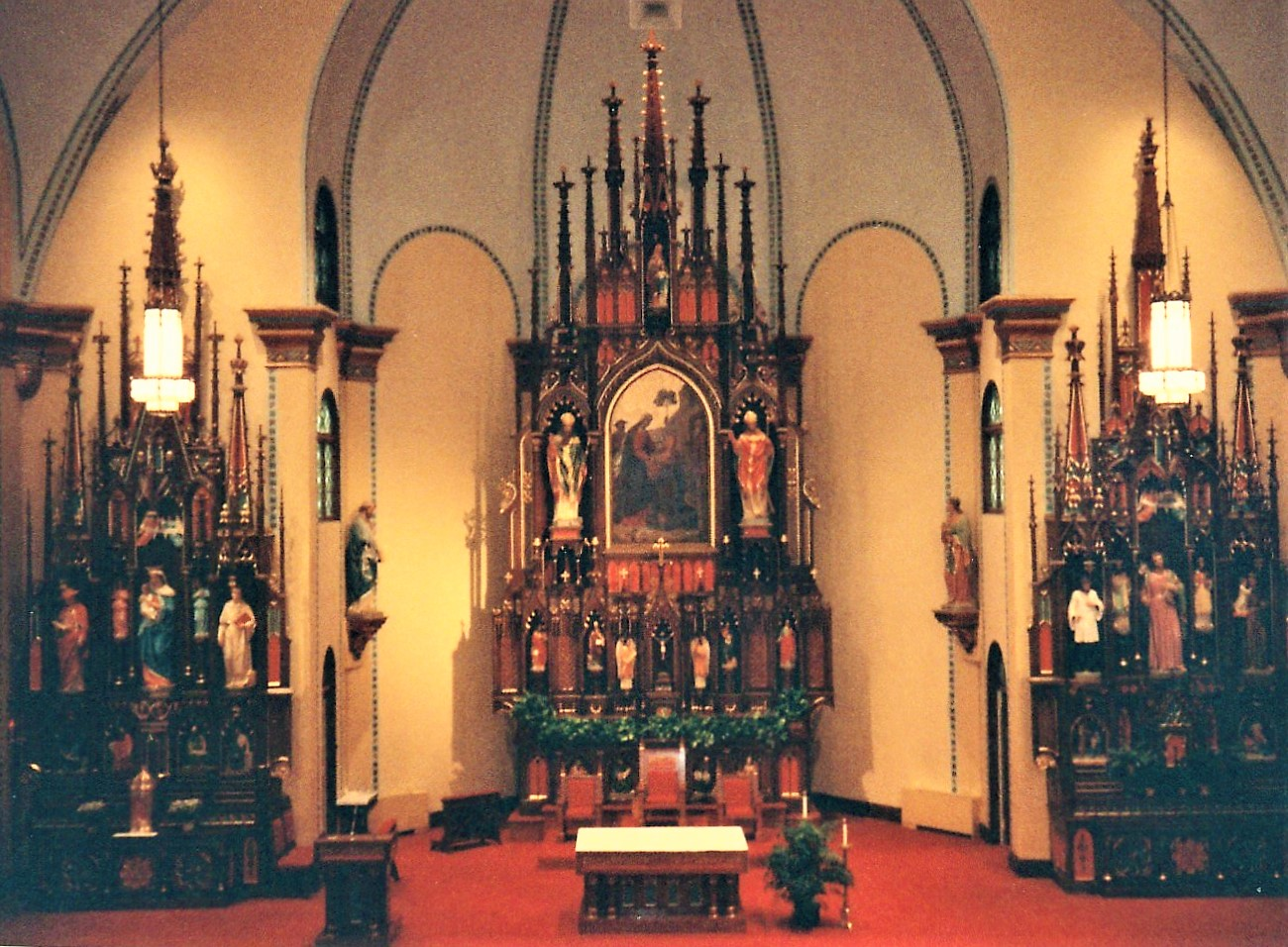
The interior of St. Mary's Church.

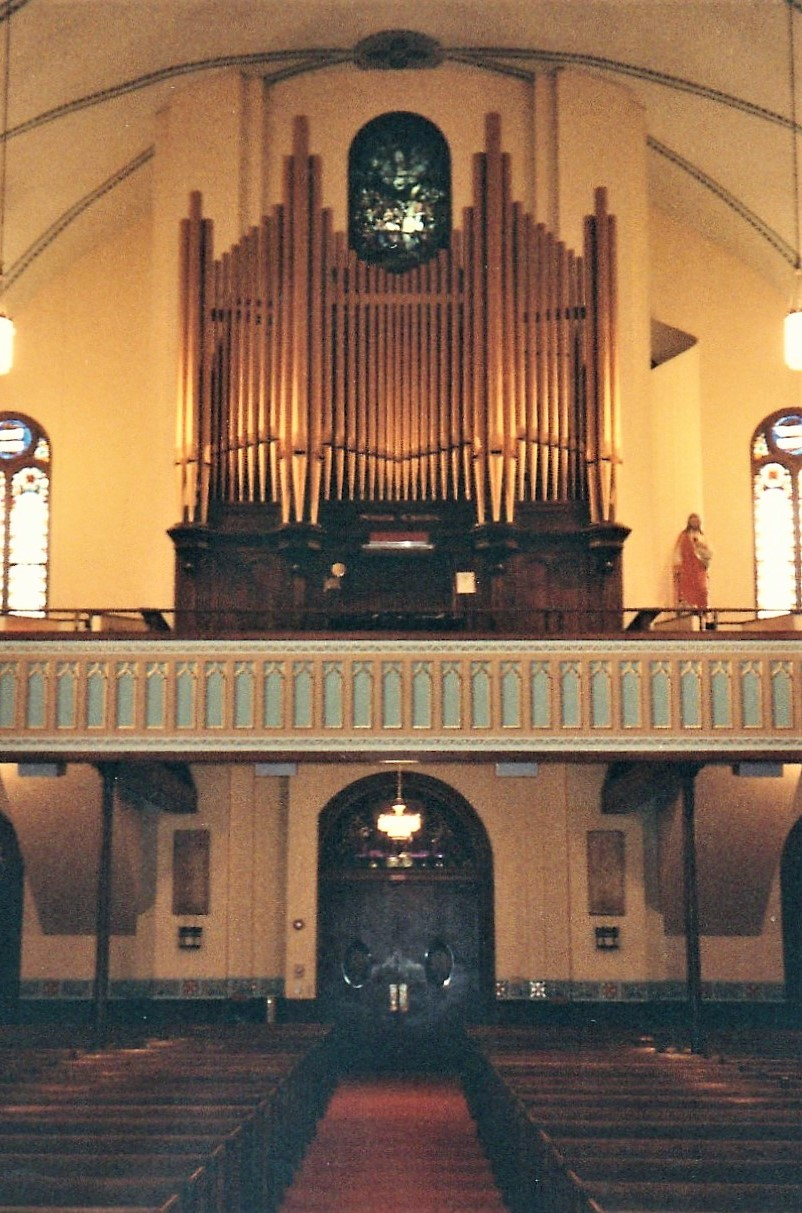
The Moline pipe organ of St. Mary's Church.

== Architecture ==
The church was constructed of red brick on a stone foundation, and it has stone trim. The Romanesque Revival style is evoked by the use of the round arch for the entrance portals, the windows, and bell tower elements. Its form and verticality, however, are more prevalent of the Gothic Revival style. The side elevations are seven bays in length and are divided by buttresses that are flanked by flat brick pilasters. Each bay contains a stained glass window and a corbel table just below the eaves. The east side of the church building has two brick structures that cover side entrances into the basement. On the west side is a brick structure that covers a handicap entrance into the church itself. The main facade is dominated by a two-stage, central bell tower that is capped by an octagon-shaped spire. At the base of the tower is the main entrance into the church. The tower is flanked by narrower side entrances. The three entrance portals are framed by compound round arches that feature limestone keystones and impost blocks. Above the main entrance is two pairs of round arch windows, and above them is the bell chamber whose cornices are arched to accommodate a clock on each face of the tower. The building is capped by a gable roof with no exterior apse on the rear of the building.

The 65-by-145-foot (20 by 44 m) rectangular structure features a large open interior without columns. The arches of the vaulted ceiling rise from impost blocks that are set high on the walls. The tall wooden high altar created by Alert and Kloustie of Cincinnati features a painting of the Visitation, which is flanked by statues of Saint Patrick and Saint Boniface. Above the painting is a statue of Saint Anne with Mary as a child. On the lower level of the reredos are statues of the Four Evangelists. The small crucifix in the center is flanked by statues of angels holding grapes and wheat in reference to the elements of the Eucharist. The former altar frontal bears the images of the four great Western Church Fathers Saints Jerome, Augustine of Hippo, Ambrose, and Gregory the Great. They flank an image of the Lamb and the scroll with seven seals from the Book of Revelation. The altar of the Blessed Virgin Mary was installed in 1872. The main statue of Mary is flanked by statues of Saints Bernard of Clairvaux and Bonaventure. Below them are bas-reliefs of Old Testament Prophets Moses, David, Isaiah, and Ezekiel. The Saint Joseph altar was installed in 1900. The main statue of Joseph is flanked by statues of Saints Aloysius Gonzaga and Anthony of Padua. The Moline pipe organ, which is still in use, was installed in 1883 in the rear gallery. The Stations of the Cross are plaster bas-reliefs that were purchased by Father Emonds on one of his trips back to his native Germany. Along the side walls of the nave are statues of the Twelve Apostles.

The rectory is a 47-by-67-foot (14 by 20 m) wood-frame structure that is covered with brick veneer. The house is essentially a large box capped with a pointed hip roof. There are large gabled wall dormers that end in shoulder parapets on the east and south elevations. The main facade is asymmetrical and is dominated by a projecting window bay of the southeast corner and the large porch on the southwest corner. The porch features large semicircular brick arches that complement the church's Romanesque Revival style.

== St. Mary's School ==
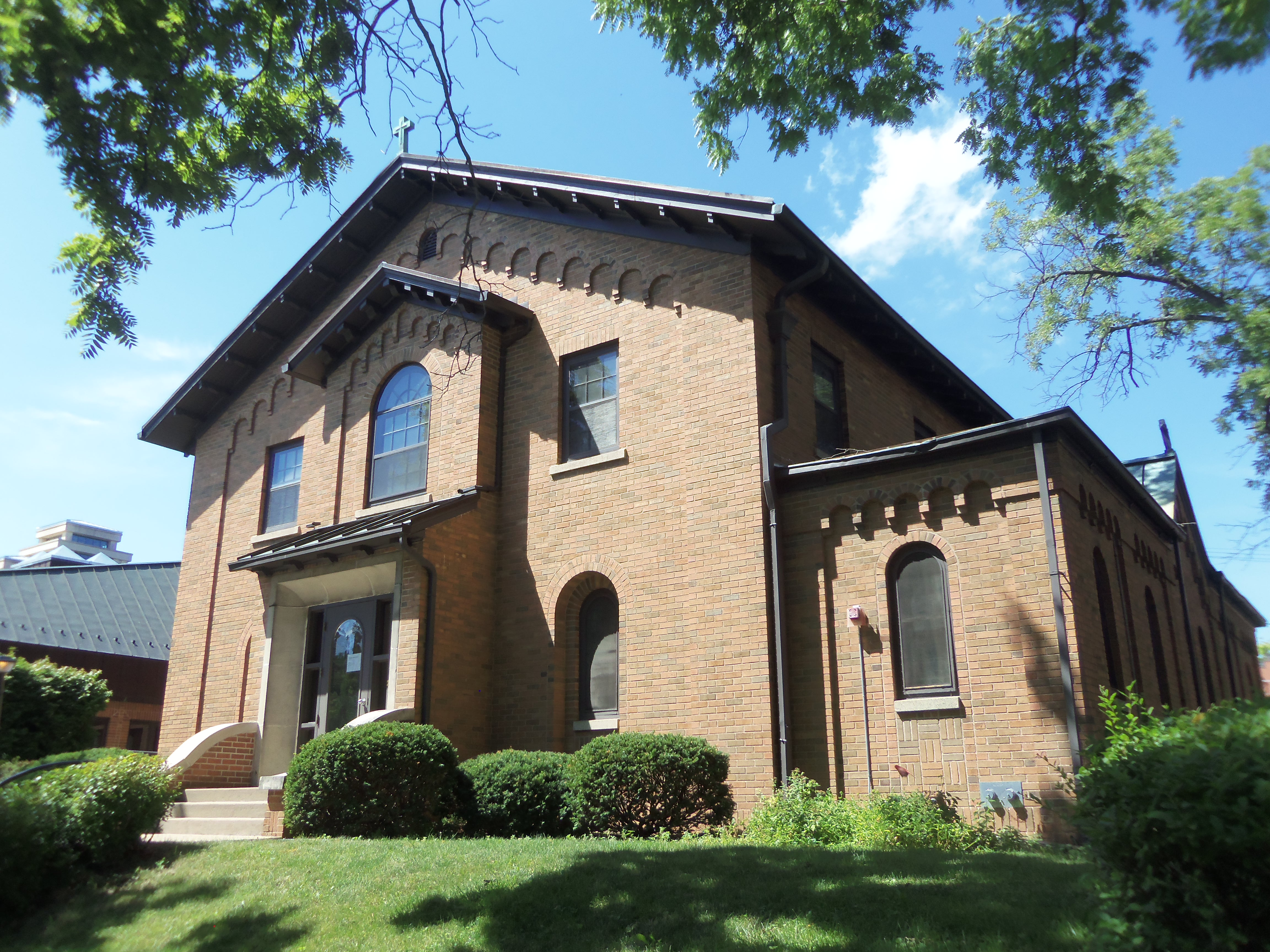
The former convent, now a part of the Newman Center, was located next to the school building.

In 1844 Father Godfert started the parish's first school in the basement of the church with Miss Norma O'Connor as the first teacher. The Sisters of Charity of the Blessed Virgin Mary arrived in Iowa City in 1860 to teach at St. Mary's. They also opened St. Agatha's Seminary, a school for girls, in 1861. In 1865 St. Joseph Institute, a school for advanced learning, was established by Father Emonds. It was taught by lay teachers and closed around 1890.

In 1892 the parish acquired property on the corner of Clinton and Jefferson Streets. The cornerstone for the new school was laid on September 11, 1892, on that location. The new school opened in 1893 with Franciscan Sisters teaching there until 1895, when the Sisters of Charity of the Blessed Virgin Mary again started teaching in the school. In 1897 high school grades were added to the school, and it was the first Catholic high school in Iowa to be accredited by the State University of Iowa. In 1911 an addition was built onto the school, which contained an auditorium and cafeteria. A convent was also built to house the sisters. It was replaced by the current building, now a part of the Newman Center, in 1926. The new convent was built for $33,000. St. Mary's and St. Patrick's Junior and Senior high schools were consolidated in 1958 when Regina High School was opened. The St. Mary's School building started to deteriorate, and it was closed in 1968. The school itself consolidated with the school at St. Patrick's and used its building. The sisters remained in the St. Mary's Convent. In 1975 the St. Mary's school buildings and convent were sold to the diocese for use by the Newman Center. In the early 1990s, an addition was made to Regina High School and the elementary grades were moved from St. Patrick's.

The school building had been listed on the National Register of Historic Places as St. Mary's High School in 1977. It was removed in 1997 after the buildings had been torn down.

== Pipe organ ==
The Moline pipe organ (1883) is located in a gallery-level case at the back of the church. It features a traditional style console with a keyboard cover that can be lifted to become the music rack and an attached keydesk en fenêtre. It is equipped with three manuals, 31 stops, 30 ranks, slider chests, mechanical key action, and mechanical stop action. The drawknobs are arranged in horizontal rows on terraced/stepped jambs. The balanced swell shoes/pedals are not in standard AGO position. The combination action is a fixed mechanical system and there is a flat straight pedalboard. The historic pipe organ was restored in 2015.

Stoplist:

GREAT 58

- 16' Double Open Diapason TC 46m
- 16' Contra Bass 12m
- 8' Open Diapason 58m
- 8' Viol di Gamba 58m
- 8' Hohl Flute 58w
- 4' Principal 58m
- 4' Flute Harmonic 58m
- 2.2/3' Twelfth 58m
- 2' Fifteenth 58m
- IV Rks. Mixture 232m
- 8' Trumpet 58m

SWELL 58 enclosed

- 16' Lieblich Gedact TC 46w
- 16' Lieblich Bourdon 12w
- 8' Open Diapason 58m
- 8' Salicional 58m
- 8' Quintadena 58m
- 8' Stopped Diapason 58w&m
- 4' Fugara 58m
- 4' Flauto Traverso 58w&m
- 2' Flautino 58m
- 8' Oboe (BB) 47m
- 8' Bassoon (CC-AA#) 11m
- Tremolo

CHOIR 58 unenclosed

- 8' Dulciana 58m
- 8' Keraulophon (1-7 from Melodia) 51m
- 8' Melodia 58w
- 4' Flute d' Amour 58w&m
- 2' Flageolet 58m
- 8' Clarionette TC 46m

PEDALE 27

- 16' Grand Open Diapason 27w
- 16' Sub Bass 27w
- 8' Bass Flute ext., 12w

Pedale Check

COUPLERS

- Swell to Great
- Choir to Great
- Swell to Choir
- Swell to Pedale
- Great to Pedale
- Choir to Pedale

COMPOSITION PEDALS

- Piano to Great
- Mezzo to Great
- Forte to Great
- Swell Mezzo (original label missing)
- Forte to Swell
- Great to Pedale (reversible)
