= Jefferson Street Historic District (Iowa City, Iowa) =

Historic district in Iowa, United States

- U.S. National Register of Historic Places
- U.S. Historic district
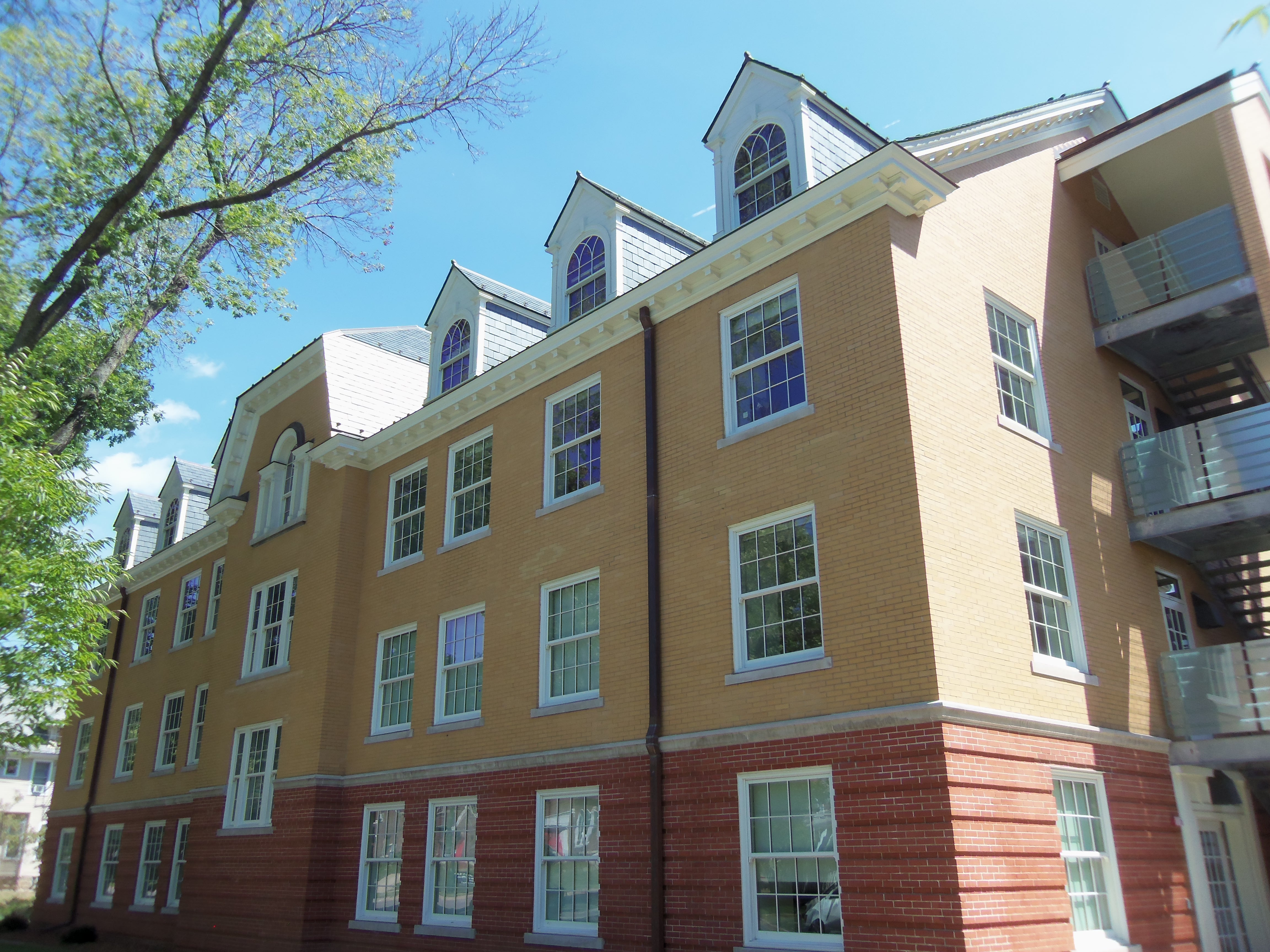
- The former State University of Iowa Isolation Hospital (1916).

- Location within Iowa Location within the United States
- Location: Portions of the 100-400 blocks of E. Jefferson St., Iowa City, Iowa
- Coordinates: 41°39′46″N 91°31′51″W
- Area: 12 acres (4.9 ha)
- Architectural style: Gothic Revival; Greek Revival
- MPS: Iowa City MPS
- NRHP reference No.: 04001097
- Added to NRHP: September 29, 2004

The Jefferson Street Historic District is a nationally recognized historic district located in Iowa City, Iowa, United States. It was listed on the National Register of Historic Places in 2004. At the time of its nomination it consisted of 39 resources, which included 36 contributing buildings and three non-contributing buildings. This section of the city started to develop to its present form in the late 19th and early 20th centuries. During this period the neighborhood was transformed from residential to include churches and buildings associated with the University of Iowa and its hospitals. Both professionals and business owners lived here, along with working-class people. Graduate students, especially those associated with the medical professions, resided in apartment buildings here. Four architecturally significant churches, along with their attendant buildings, are located in the district.

The architectural styles of both residential and institutional forms found here are representative of those built in the city from the 1850s through the 1930s. The Gothic Revival, especially for the churches, and Greek Revival styles are particularly evident. Architects of regional and local importance with buildings in the district include Gurdon P. Randall, Proudfoot & Bird, and Orville H. Carpenter. The William Bostick House (1851), Park House Hotel (1852), St. Mary's Catholic Church (1869) and Rectory (1891), and the Congregational United Church of Christ (1869) are individually listed on the National Register of Historic Places.
