= Lone Tree, Iowa =

- City
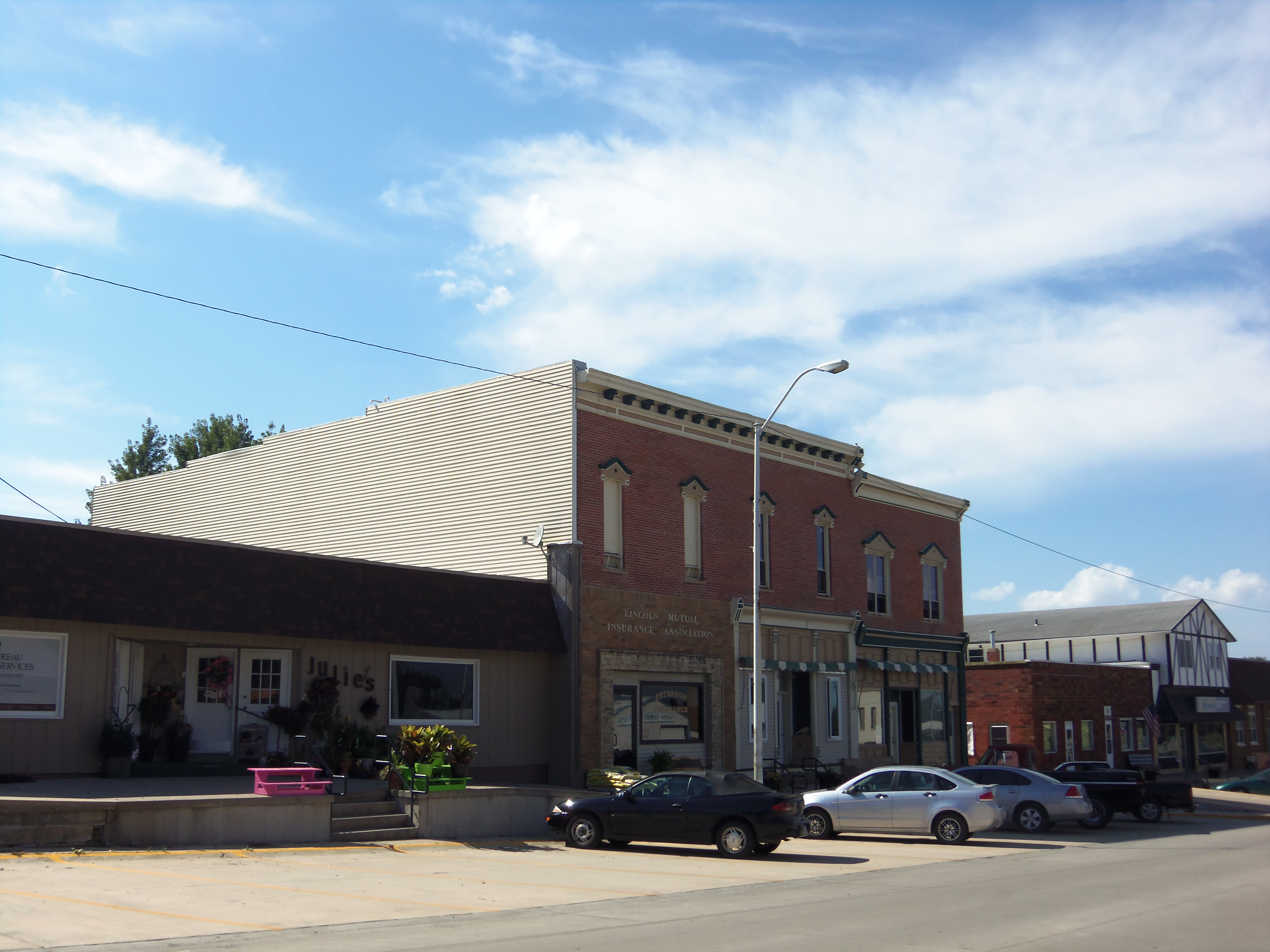
- Buildings in downtown Lone Tree off of West Commercial Street

- Location of Lone Tree, Iowa
- Coordinates: 41°29′09″N 91°25′36″W
- Country: United States
- State: Iowa
- County: Johnson
- Incorporated: May 20, 1890

Government
  - Type: Mayor–council government
  - Mayor: Josh Spillman

Area
  - Total: 1.07 sq mi (2.76 km^{2})
  - Land: 1.07 sq mi (2.76 km^{2})
  - Water: 0 sq mi (0.00 km^{2})
- Elevation: 735 ft (224 m)

Population (2020)
  - Total: 1,357
  - Density: 1,272.0/sq mi (491.11/km^{2})
- Time zone: UTC-6 (Central (CST))
  - Summer (DST): UTC-5 (CDT)
- ZIP code: 52755
- Area code: 319
- FIPS code: 19-46335
- GNIS feature ID: 2395752
- Website: www.lonetreeiowa.com

Lone Tree is a city in southeastern Johnson County, Iowa, United States. It is part of the Iowa City, Iowa Metropolitan Statistical Area. The population was 1,357 at the time of the 2020 census.

== History ==
Lone Tree was platted by John W. Jayne in 1872. Lone Tree derives its name from a giant elm that grew nearby in the pioneer era and served as a prairie landmark. This elm stood on a slight hill south of town. Local legend has it that the tree was so large, buffalo grazed under its expansive branches. It escaped prairie fires because of the lack of grass around the tree. The tree succumbed to the Dutch Elm disease of the 1960s, although valiant efforts were made to save it. The wood from the tree was used to make a sign denoting the tree's home on the hill southeast of the city limits.

On December 9, 1985, during the 1980s farm crisis, a local farmer, Dale Burr, became distraught over his growing debt. He shot his wife Emily in their home. He then went to Hills Bank & Trust in the neighboring town of Hills and attempted to cash a check and when rebuffed, returned with a shotgun and killed bank president John Hughes. Next on his list was his neighbor Richard Goody, who had recently won a court settlement against Burr's son. When pulled over by Johnson County sheriffs, Burr shot himself fatally. Burr had left a note beside his wife's body. It said he "couldn't manage his problems anymore." The story was captured in Bruce Brown's book Lone Tree.

== Geography ==
According to the United States Census Bureau, the city has a total area of 1.04 square miles (2.69 km^{2}), all land.

Lone Tree is located alongside Iowa Highway 22.

== Demographics ==
Historical populations
Year	Pop.	±%
1880	217	—
1890	448	+106.5%
1900	600	+33.9%
1910	782	+30.3%
1920	673	−13.9%
1930	627	−6.8%
1940	651	+3.8%
1950	639	−1.8%
1960	717	+12.2%
1970	834	+16.3%
1980	1,014	+21.6%
1990	979	−3.5%
2000	1,151	+17.6%
2010	1,300	+12.9%
2020	1,357	+4.4%
Source:"U.S. Census website". United States Census Bureau. and Iowa Data Center; Source: U.S. Decennial Census

=== 2020 census ===
As of the 2020 census, Lone Tree had a population of 1,357, with 544 households and 359 families residing in the city. The median age was 41.3 years. 22.3% of residents were under the age of 18. For every 100 females, there were 98.4 males, and for every 100 females age 18 and over, there were 94.6 males age 18 and over.

Age distribution was 25.1% under 20; 4.5% from 20 to 24; 24.5% from 25 to 44; 26.3% from 45 to 64; and 19.6% age 65 or older. The gender makeup of the city was 49.6% male and 50.4% female.

The population density was 1,273.4 inhabitants per square mile (491.7/km^{2}). There were 593 housing units at an average density of 556.5 per square mile (214.8/km^{2}). Of all housing units, 8.3% were vacant. The homeowner vacancy rate was 1.4% and the rental vacancy rate was 14.9%. 0.0% of residents lived in urban areas, while 100.0% lived in rural areas.

Of the 544 households, 32.2% had children under the age of 18 living with them, 50.6% were married-couple households, 9.9% were cohabitating-couple households, 23.3% had a female householder with no spouse or partner present, and 16.2% had a male householder with no spouse or partner present. Non-family households made up 34.0% of all households. About 26.4% of all households were made up of individuals, and 12.7% had someone living alone who was 65 years of age or older.

Racial composition as of the 2020 census
Race	Number	Percent
White	1,245	91.7%
Black or African American	8	0.6%
American Indian and Alaska Native	2	0.1%
Asian	8	0.6%
Native Hawaiian and Other Pacific Islander	0	0.0%
Some other race	39	2.9%
Two or more races	55	4.1%
Hispanic or Latino (of any race)	89	6.6%

=== 2010 census ===
As of the census of 2010, there were 1,300 people, 505 households, and 335 families living in the city. The population density was 1,250.0 inhabitants per square mile (482.6/km^{2}). There were 539 housing units at an average density of 518.3 per square mile (200.1/km^{2}). The racial makeup of the city was 94.8% White, 0.7% African American, 0.2% Native American, 0.5% Asian, 1.7% from other races, and 2.1% from two or more races. Hispanic or Latino of any race were 4.0% of the population.

There were 505 households, of which 36.0% had children under the age of 18 living with them, 53.1% were married couples living together, 10.1% had a female householder with no husband present, 3.2% had a male householder with no wife present, and 33.7% were non-families. 26.5% of all households were made up of individuals, and 10.5% had someone living alone who was 65 years of age or older. The average household size was 2.50 and the average family size was 3.06.

The median age in the city was 39.3 years. 26.2% of residents were under the age of 18; 6.2% were between the ages of 18 and 24; 26.2% were from 25 to 44; 26.9% were from 45 to 64; and 14.4% were 65 years of age or older. The gender makeup of the city was 49.2% male and 50.8% female.

=== 2000 census ===
As of the census of 2000, there were 1,151 people, 459 households, and 323 families living in the city. The population density was 1,165.3 inhabitants per square mile (449.9/km^{2}). There were 489 housing units at an average density of 495.1 per square mile (191.2/km^{2}). The racial makeup of the city was 98.96% White, 0.17% African American, 0.09% Asian, 0.26% from other races, and 0.52% from two or more races. Hispanic or Latino of any race were 0.52% of the population.

There were 459 households, out of which 41.6% had children under the age of 18 living with them, 57.5% were married couples living together, 7.6% had a female householder with no husband present, and 29.6% were non-families. 25.1% of all households were made up of individuals, and 11.8% had someone living alone who was 65 years of age or older. The average household size was 2.51 and the average family size was 3.04.

29.4% are under the age of 18, 5.9% from 18 to 24, 31.1% from 25 to 44, 20.2% from 45 to 64, and 13.5% who were 65 years of age or older. The median age was 35 years. For every 100 females, there were 97.1 males. For every 100 females age 18 and over, there were 89.5 males.

The median income for a household in the city was $42,431, and the median income for a family was $50,000. Males had a median income of $35,227 versus $25,815 for females. The per capita income for the city was $18,990. About 4.5% of families and 7.8% of the population were below the poverty line, including 4.9% of those under age 18 and 14.1% of those age 65 or over.
