= St. Mary's Rectory (Iowa City, Iowa) =

Historic house in Iowa, United States

- St. Mary’s Rectory
- U.S. National Register of Historic Places
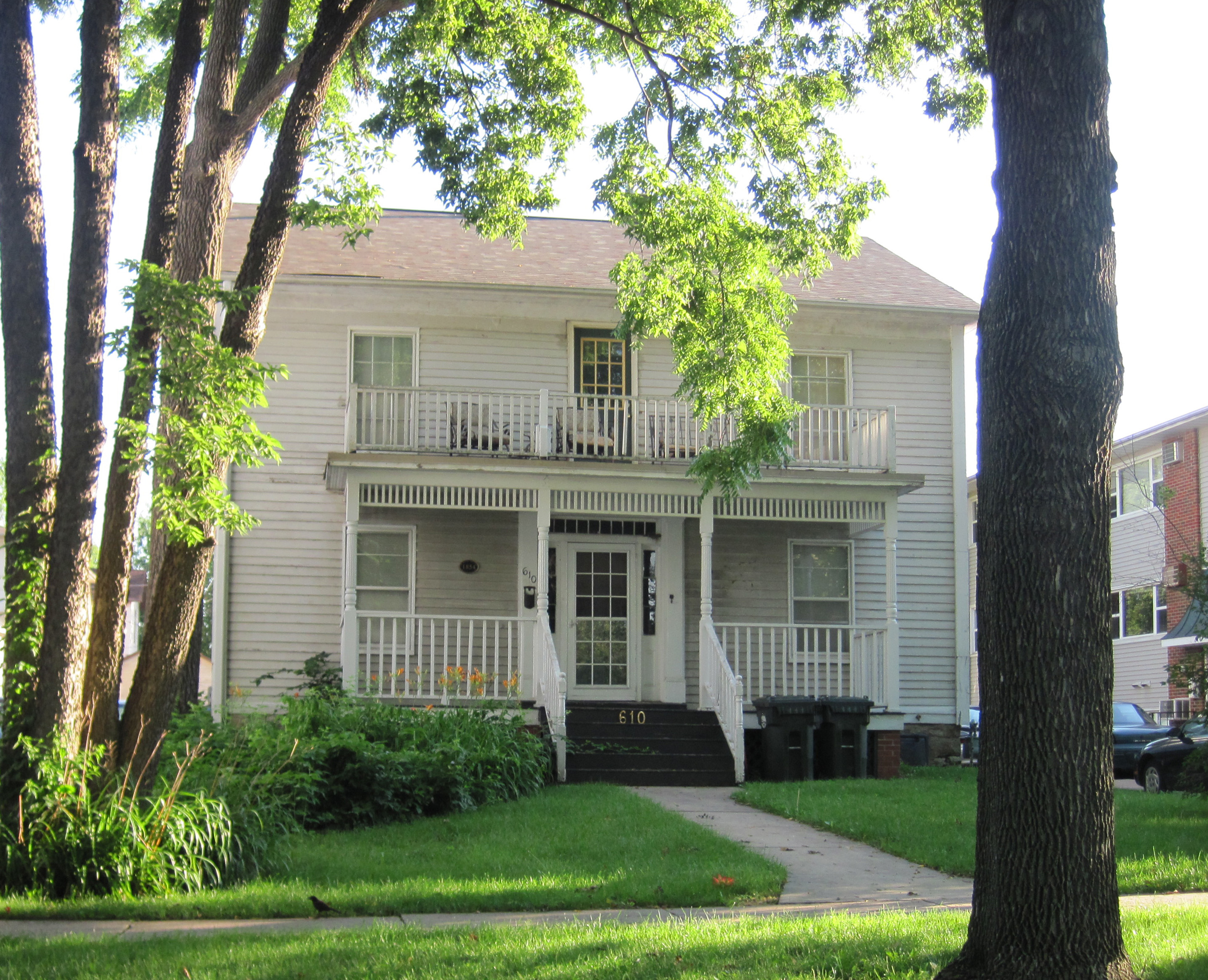

- Location within Iowa Location within the United States
- Location: 610 E. Jefferson St. Iowa City, Iowa
- Coordinates: 41°39′45.7″N 91°31′36.2″W
- Area: less than one acre
- Built: 1854
- Architectural style: Greek Revival
- NRHP reference No.: 95000811
- Added to NRHP: July 7, 1995

The former St. Mary's Rectory is a historic building located in Iowa City, Iowa, United States. Now a private home, the residence housed the Catholic clergy that served St. Mary's Catholic Church from 1854 to 1892. At that time the house was located next to the church, which is four blocks to the west. It was listed on the National Register of Historic Places in 1995.

== History ==
St. Mary's parish was founded in 1841 by the Rev. Samuel Charles Mazzuchelli, OP. He bought two lots for the church on Jefferson Street. Mazzuchelli, however, did not reside in Iowa City, nor did many of the early priests, who served multiple parishes and were based elsewhere. The first resident pastor, Rev. Anthony Godfert, served in Iowa City from 1842 to 1844. The second pastor, the Rev. B. M. Poyet (1848–1850), and the third pastor, the Rev. Francis P. McCormick (1851–52) resided in Iowa City, but there is no mention of a rectory in church records. The Rev. Mathias Hannon arrived at St. Mary's as an assistant and became pastor in 1852. He served St. Mary's until 1855. It was during his pastorate that the front two rooms of both floors were built in 1854. The rectory was constructed to the west of the original church on the north side of the property along the alley. The home was built for $1,100. The rooms on the back side of the house were added two years later.

Following Father Hannon, other clergy who lived in the rectory included the Revs. Mathias Michael (1855–1858), William Emonds (1858–1890) and John F. Kempker (1890–1891). It was during Father Kempker's brief pastorate that the rectory was moved four blocks to its present location in the 600 block of East Jefferson Street. In 1892 the Rev. A.J. Schulte built the current rectory on the same lot as the old rectory for $8,000. It, along with the church, is also listed on the National Register of Historic Places. After this home ceased to house clergy it became a private residence. It has been used has both a single family and multi-family house.

== Architecture ==
The dwelling is a simple wood-frame structure with a side gable that was built on a limestone foundation. The 33-by-33-foot (10 by 10 m) structure sits 70 feet (21 m) from the street. It is a rare example of a vernacular form of the Greek Revival style found in Iowa City. It has four rooms on each floor. The porch is believed to be from 1891 when the house was moved to its present location, although the house had a porch when it was located on the church property. The main entrance on the first floor is framed by sidelights and a transom. The second floor entrance-way that opens onto the balcony on top of the porch is original to the structure.
