= Park House Hotel =

- U.S. National Register of Historic Places
- U.S. Historic district – Contributing property
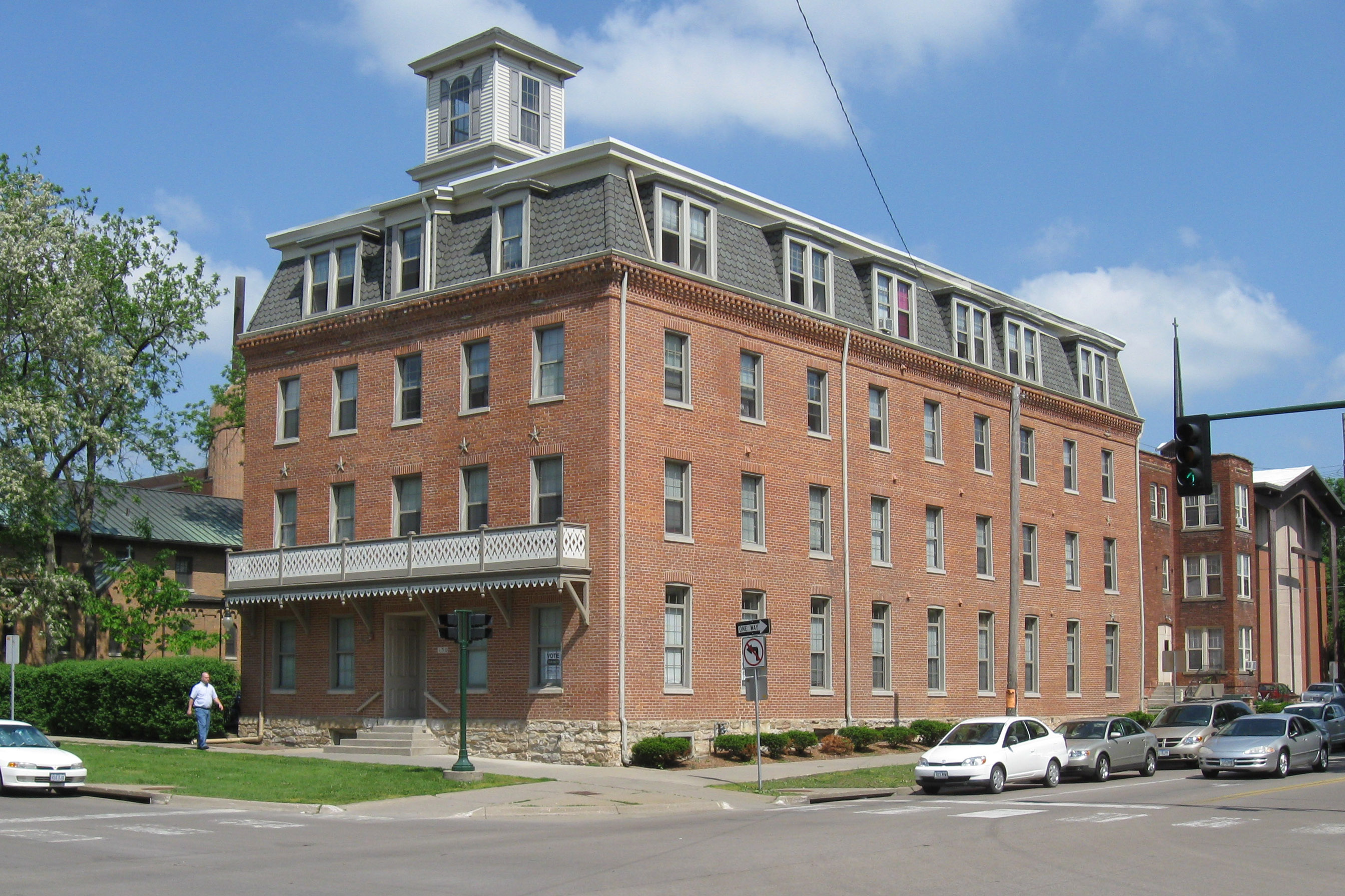

- Location within Iowa Location within the United States
- Location: 130 E. Jefferson St. Iowa City, Iowa
- Coordinates: 41°39′46″N 91°32′0″W
- Area: less than one acre
- Built: 1852
- Part of: Jefferson Street Historic District (ID04001097)
- NRHP reference No.: 78001229
- Added to NRHP: December 11, 1978

The Park House Hotel, also known as St. Agatha's Seminary and Burkeley Apartments, is a historic building located in Iowa City, Iowa, United States.

The building was built in 1852 for Ferdinand Haberstroh. As the Park House Hotel, it catered to those who did business when the city was the capital of Iowa, and it is one of the few remaining commercial buildings from that era.

After Haberstroh died in 1860, the Rev. William Emonds of nearby St. Mary's Catholic Church bought the property and its debt. Two years later the Sisters of Charity of the Blessed Virgin Mary from Dubuque, Iowa, opened St. Agatha's Female Seminary. An early photo of the building shows a sign running the length of the building saying, "Seminary for the Education of Young Ladies." The building acquired its mansard roof in 1875. Classrooms were located on the first two floors, and residential space for the sisters and students who boarded there were on the upper two floors. The school closed in 1909, and Albert Burkeley converted the building into a women's boarding house called "Svendi". After 1918 it became an apartment building known as "Burkeley Place", and it has been an apartment building ever since.

The building was individually listed on the National Register of Historic Places in 1978 as property number 04001097. In 2004 it was included as a contributing property in the Jefferson Street Historic District. The lower photo was taken after extensive renovations, including replacing the cupola, by Michael Hodge of Hodge Construction in Iowa City.
