= Congregational United Church of Christ (Iowa City, Iowa) =

- Congregational Church of Iowa City
- U.S. National Register of Historic Places
- U.S. Historic district – Contributing property
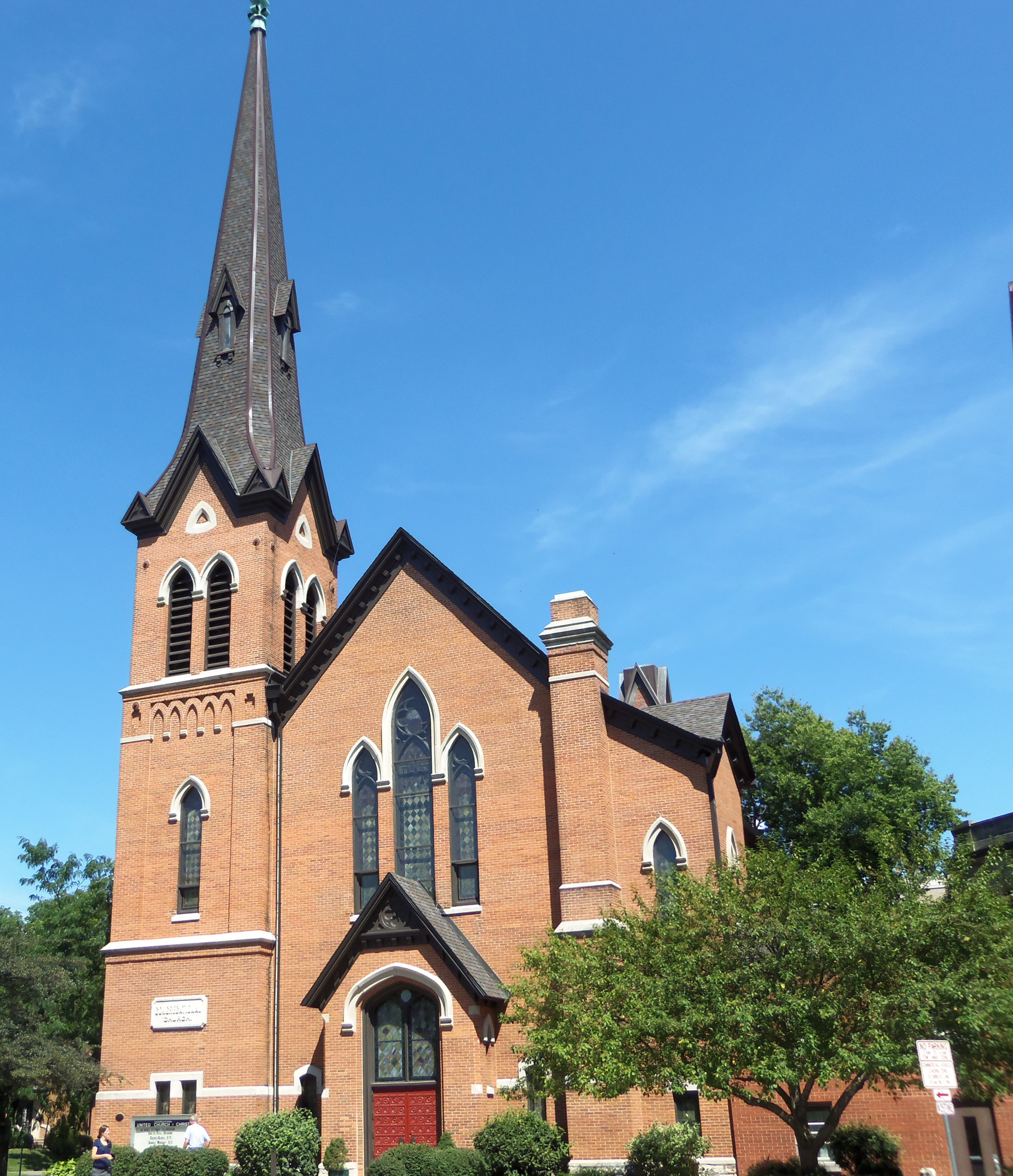

- Location within Iowa Location within the United States
- Location: 30 N. Clinton St. Iowa City, Iowa
- Coordinates: 41°39′44″N 91°32′2″W
- Built: 1869
- Architect: Gurdon P. Randall
- Architectural style: Gothic Revival
- Part of: Jefferson Street Historic District (ID04001097)
- NRHP reference No.: 73000729
- Added to NRHP: June 18, 1973

Congregational United Church of Christ is located in the downtown area of Iowa City, Iowa, United States near the campus of the University of Iowa. The congregation was organized in 1856 and the church building was listed on the National Register of Historic Places in 1973. In 2004 it was included as a contributing property in the Jefferson Street Historic District.

== History ==
Seventeen individuals signed the charter that initiated the congregation in 1856. Chicago architect Gurdon P. Randall designed the present church and the cornerstone was laid in 1868. The building cost $30,000 to construct, and it was dedicated on December 9, 1869.

A parsonage was built on the eastside of the church in 1891, which was later sold to the university and is now the location of the biology building. In 1903 a Lyon and Healy organ was installed. Other additions to the church include the administration annex, which was built in 1924, and the Little Chapel built in 1940.

In 1957 the Congregational Church and the Evangelical and Reformed Church merged to form the United Church of Christ. The congregation was affiliated with the new church at this time. The same year a new Wicks organ was installed and the Christian Education building was added.

Renovations to the church building made for a new ground floor entry and improvements to the social hall, choir loft and chancel in 1969. The sanctuary became handicapped accessible in 1986, and was renovated in 2002.

The Casavant Frères, Opus 3867, pipe organ was donated anonymously to the congregation in 2007. It combines elements of the church's previous instruments. The base of the retable woodwork is from the 1903 Lyon and Healy organ; the upper portion of the case, with the Gothic style embellishments, were from the 1934 additions; and seven ranks from the 1958 Wicks organ are part of the 29 ranks of the new organ.

== Architecture ==
The brick, Gothic Revival structure features a square corner tower, an asymmetrical facade, and a small tower at the rear that was part of the ventilating heating system. The small turret opposite the tower originally terminated in a pinnacle. A small vestibule, added in 1969, projects from the front of the building. Above it are three lancet windows. The same type of window also lines the side walls. The main sanctuary is located above a raised basement. A 1934 renovation of the interior saw the introduction of the Gothic-styled beams on what was a plain ceiling.
