= William Bostick House =

Historic house in Iowa, United States

- U.S. National Register of Historic Places
- U.S. Historic district – Contributing property
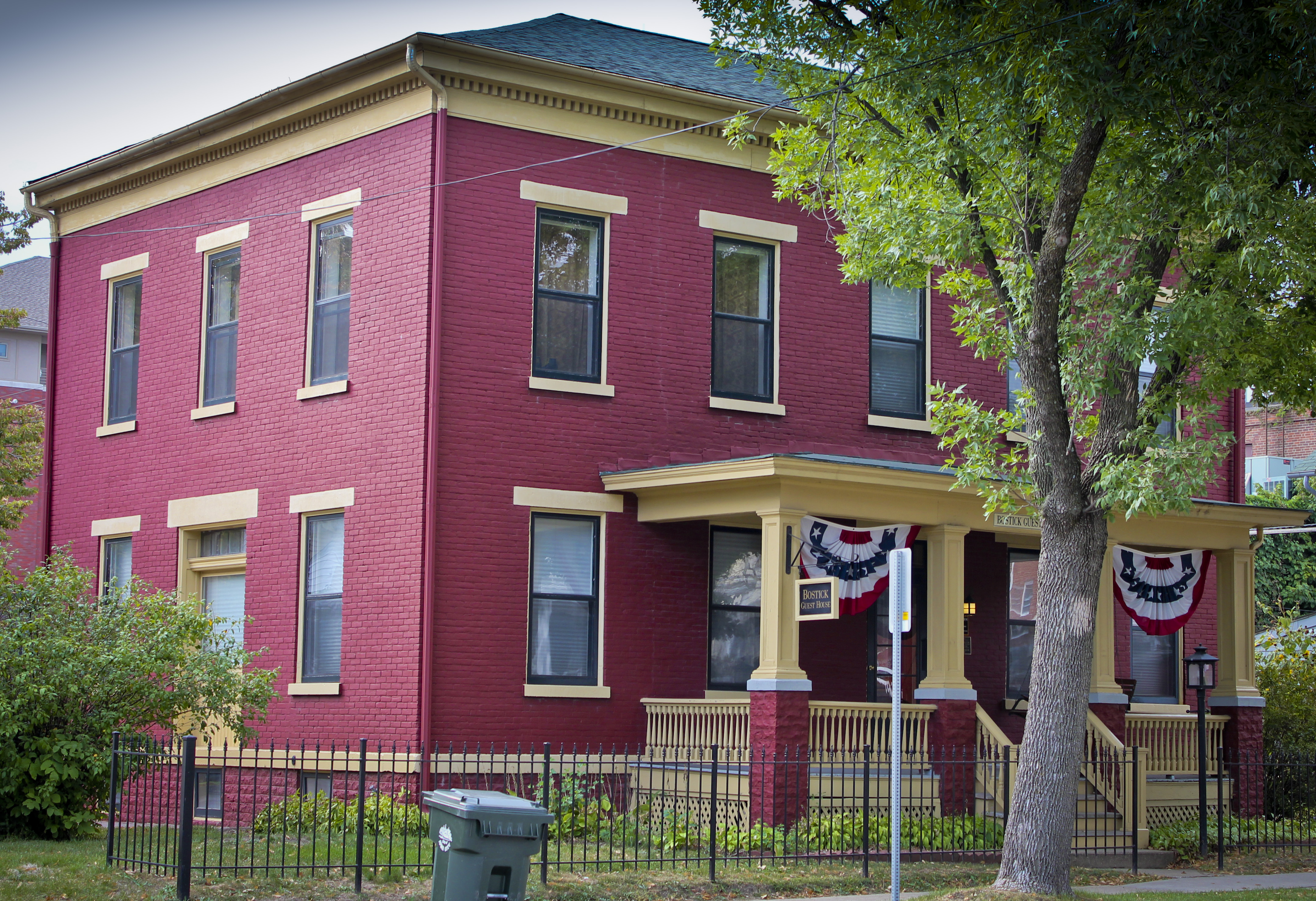

- Location within Iowa Location within the United States
- Location: 115 N. Gilbert St. Iowa City, Iowa
- Coordinates: 41°39′46.6″N 91°31′49.5″W
- Area: less than one acre
- Built: 1851
- Built by: William H. Bostick
- Architectural style: Greek Revival
- Part of: Jefferson Street Historic District (ID04001097)
- NRHP reference No.: 96000312
- Added to NRHP: March 28, 1996

The William Bostick House is a historic building located at 115 North Gilbert Street in Iowa City, Iowa.

== Description and history ==
William H. Bostick, who built this house in 1851, is credited with constructing the first brick building in the city. The two-story structure is a vernacular high style Greek Revival. The decorative elements were kept to a minimum. It features limestone lintels, a low-pitched hipped roof, an Arts and Crafts style porch with a balustrade of turned spindles, and a simple entablature across the top. The bricks and stonework have long been painted. It is believed the building served as an early city hall here and as a recruitment center for Civil War regiments. While the house has always been on this lot, it was moved to its current location further back on the lot in 1908. The present porch was added at that time.

The house was individually listed on the National Register of Historic Places in 1996. In 2004 it was included as a contributing property in the Jefferson Street Historic District.
