= Jim Miller (offensive guard) =

American football player (born 1949)

- Miller in 1972

No. 55
- Position: Offensive guard

Personal information
- Born: July 24, 1949 (age 77); Iowa City, Iowa, U.S.
- Listed height: 6 ft 3 in (1.91 m)
- Listed weight: 240 lb (109 kg)

Career information
- High school: Regina (Iowa City)
- College: Iowa (1967–1970)
- NFL draft: 1971: undrafted

Career history
- Atlanta Falcons (1971–1974); Green Bay Packers (1976)*
- * Offseason or practice squad member only

Career NFL statistics
- Games played: 30
- Starts: 11
- Stats at Pro Football Reference

James Robert Miller (born July 24, 1949) is an American former professional football player who was an offensive guard for three seasons with the Atlanta Falcons of the National Football League (NFL). He played college football for the Iowa Hawkeyes.

== Early life and college ==
James Robert Miller was born on July 24, 1949, in Iowa City, Iowa. He was a two sport (basketball and football) All-State athlete for Regina High School in Iowa City.

Miller played college football at the University of Iowa as an offensive tackle. He was on the freshman team in 1967. He was then a three-year letterman and three-year starter for the Hawkeyes from 1968 to 1970. He graduated with a business degree.

== Professional career ==
Miller signed with the Atlanta Falcons of the National Football League (NFL) after going undrafted in the 1971 NFL draft. Falcons head coach Norm Van Brocklin said that Miller went undrafted due to being overweight. Miller was 270 pounds in college but dropped to 235 with the Falcons. He played in all 14 games for the Falcons during his rookie year in 1971, recovering one fumble, while mostly playing special teams. He injured his knee during the 1972 preseason, and missed the first five games of the 1972 regular season. Miller returned and played in two games before suffering a season-ending knee injury. He ended up missing the entire 1973 season due to injury as well. He played in all 14 games, starting 11, for the Falcons in 1974. Miller had another injury setback in July 1975. It was revealed that his knee had "bone fragments chipped and floating loose". Miller stated "Right now I've decided not to play this year. Possibly I'll play next season, but I haven't really decided yet. It would depend on how my knee is and how things are going for me otherwise." Miller was then released by the Falcons after having knee surgery for the fourth time.

Miller signed with the Green Bay Packers in April 1976. On August 2, 1976, Miller retired from the NFL after being declared physically unable to perform due to his knee.

== Post-playing career ==
In 1977, Miller returned to the Falcons as a scout for two years. In 1980, he started Jim Miller Real Estate Development. In 1988, it was reported that Miller owned 200 apartment units in Iowa City and 500 apartment units in Ohio.
