= Hills Bank and Trust Company =

Hills Bank is an independent community bank based in Hills, Iowa, U.S.A., with 500 employees across 19 offices in four Eastern Iowa counties and total assets of $4.5 billion. Hills Bank is the 3rd largest bank headquartered in Iowa. Its headquarters are in Hills, IA, a town of fewer than 1,000 people located south of Iowa City. The bank was founded in 1904, and is a subsidiary of Hills Bancorporation, a holding company established on December 12, 1982. The bank's president and CEO is Lisa Shileny. Member FDIC.

== Early Years: Hills Savings Bank ==
On February 15, 1904, Hills Savings Bank was founded by 19 local citizens with $10,000 among them and the dream of organizing a local savings bank. Subscriptions for stock in the bank were purchased with each share valued at $100. A board of directors was elected and plans were made to construct a building.

Later that summer, the Hills Savings Bank opened for business with only a handful of employees. Albert Droll was hired as a teller in 1921 and officially became president in 1965.

Approximately 25 years after the bank's doors opened, the Great Depression struck causing 600 banks in Iowa to fail. Among those to close were all five banks in Iowa City, and seven of nine banks in Cedar Rapids. This was a defining time and turning point for the small Hills Savings Bank in Hills, whose doors remained open through the Great Depression.

== Early Years: Hills Bank and Trust Company ==
In 1934, Hills Savings Bank reorganized under the new name of Hills Bank and Trust Company. The name change more accurately reflected the services that the bank offered. At that time, the total capital of the bank was $30,000.

The bank expanded in 1952, when a new one-story building was built east of the existing building. During that time, the town of Hills boasted a population of 211 and the total resources of the bank were $3,132,200 —“the largest per capita resources of any bank in an Iowa community” as stated in an Iowa City Press-Citizen article, June 1952.

== Hills Bank and Trust Company Expansion ==
For many years, Iowa banking law allowed banks to establish a bank branch only in towns where the boundaries were contiguous. In 1979, the city of Hills annexed their small town to Iowa City by way of the old Rock Island Railroad track, which connected Hills to Iowa City. This annexation provided an opportunity for the first Hills Bank location to be opened outside of Hills, in the city of Iowa City. Hills Bank could then better serve its customers in the Iowa City area.

The first Iowa City office was completed in November 1982 on South Gilbert Street. The branch opened for business with 10 employees. At that time, the total assets of Hills Bank exceeded $100 million, making it the third largest bank in Iowa City.

In 1984, Hills Bank purchased UniBank & Trust. This acquisition added two more branches, one on Highway 6 in Coralville and another in downtown North Liberty. In March 1985, John Hughes publicly announced plans to relocate the downtown North Liberty office to the new site.

John Hughes was murdered in the bank in December 1985. His untimely death was challenging, but with the solid foundation made by John, strong support of customers, guidance from the board of directors, and the commitment and teamwork of the employees, the bank moved forward building on his legacy.

In 1986, Dwight Seegmiller, an employee of the bank since 1975, was named the new Hills Bank president.

In 1990, Hills Bank opened its fifth location on Washington Street in downtown Iowa City. Hills Bank continued to grow within Johnson County and expanded its markets into Linn and Washington counties in 1996 by acquiring Lisbon Bank and Trust in Lisbon and establishing a bank location in Kalona. In 1998, a branch in Mount Vernon was built to provide convenience to the growing number of customers in this area. Then, in 1999, the third Iowa City office opened on the eastside, later moving to its present location in 2001. The bank had the opportunity to open a branch in downtown Cedar Rapids in 2000.

To accommodate the growth of the bank, property was purchased in 2001 on the west side of the main bank in Hills. A 45,000-square-foot (4,200 m^{2}) operations center was built to house the many employees who process customer loans and deposits. This allows all processing to be centralized, resulting in a much more efficient work environment in the town where Hills Bank began.

In 2002, an office on the southwest side of Cedar Rapids was constructed. In early 2003, a branch was opened for business in Marion. The new offices and staff enhanced services and convenience for Linn County customers.

In 2004, the bank's 100th anniversary was celebrated. After a century of business building relationships, the bank had grown from 19 founding citizens to over 450 co-workers at 12 offices, serving customers from local communities to around the world.

In 2005, the bank began offering services on location to residents at Oaknoll Retirement Community in Iowa City. Then in 2006, an office was established in Wellman serving an already strong base of customers. This increased the number of Washington County offices to two.

In 2009, an office on the northeast side of Cedar Rapids was constructed on Blairs Ferry Road.

In 2012, an office in North Liberty was constructed on Forevergreen Road and became the new location of the Trust and Wealth Management department. Also in 2012, branches were opened on the University of Iowa Campus at the Iowa Memorial Union and at the University of Iowa Hospital and Clinics.

In 2015, an office in Washington was constructed on Hwy 92.

In 2016, a second office in Marion was constructed on 7th Ave.

In 2019, Hills Bank and Trust Company rebranded itself as Hills Bank, along with a new logo and tagline – “Connection is here.”

In December 2024, Hills Bank opened a bank office in Williamsburg, IA, its first location in Iowa County.

== AG Month ==
In 1990, the bank highlighted contributions of the ag community with a special Ag Week. Enthusiasm for the event hatched, literally, in 1996 when the first baby chicks peeped in the Hills office lobby. Children and adults alike celebrated the anticipation of spring and the joy of new life. The event sparked an annual month-long tradition, complete with baby chicks at each office.

== Flood of 2008 ==
The summer of 2008 left its mark in the minds of many in the community as flood waters rose in homes and businesses, including the bank's offices in downtown Cedar Rapids and on South Gilbert Street in Iowa City. Co-workers and countless volunteers worked to relocate contents of the offices. Service to customers continued at temporary locations while the buildings were renovated. Later that year, the offices reopened while the Trust and Wealth Management Division relocated to a new site at the Grand Rail development in Coralville.

As the rebuilding wrapped up, new construction began with the groundbreaking for a new location on the northeast side of Cedar Rapids in early 2009, and the permanent building opened for business in early 2010. The bank then had 14 offices in three eastern Iowa counties serving more than 117,000 customers.
