= Regina High School (Iowa) =

Private secondary school in Iowa City, Iowa, United States

Regina Catholic Education Center

Location
- 2150 Rochester Avenue; Iowa City, Iowa 52245; United States
- Coordinates: 41°39′59″N 91°30′16″W

Information
- Type: Private school
- Religious affiliation: Roman Catholic
- Oversight: Roman Catholic Diocese of Davenport
- NCES School ID: 00457678
- Principal: Glenn Plummer
- Teaching staff: 60.0 (on an FTE basis)
- Grades: PK–12
- Gender: Co-educational
- Enrollment: 858 (2015-2016)
- Student to teacher ratio: 13.9
- Colors: Navy Blue and Gold
- Athletics conference: River Valley Conference
- Mascot: Reggie
- Team name: Regals
- Newspaper: None
- Website: www.regina.org

Regina Catholic Education Center is a PK–12 private, Roman Catholic co-educational school in Iowa City, Iowa, United States. It is located in the Roman Catholic Diocese of Davenport.

== Athletics ==
Regina's sports teams are known as the Regals, with a school mascot named "Reggie," a lion. Reggie replaced "Crownie," an anthropomorphic blue and gold crown, as mascot during the 2025-26 school year.

The Regals won a state football championship in 2005, and more recently have won a state record six titles in a row from 2010 to 2015, a string that included a record 56 game winning streak from 2010 to 2013. From 2007 to 2020, the team was coached by former NFL tight end Marv Cook, who attended high school at Regina's conference rival West Branch High School.

The Regals have won eight state titles in boys' cross-country since 1993. The girls' softball team took the state title in 2011.

=== State championships ===
- Boys' Cross Country - 8-time State Champions (1993, 1997, 1998, 2003, 2004, 2006, 2007, 2010, 2022)
- Boys' Soccer - 9-time Class 1A State Champions (2009, 2010, 2011, 2013, 2014, 2017, 2018, 2019, 2026)
- Football - 8-time State Champions (2005, 2010, 2011, 2012, 2013, 2014, 2015, 2020)
- Boys' Basketball -3 time Class 1A State Champions (1976, 1978, 1979)
- Softball - 4-time Class 2A State Champions (2011, 2015, 2017, 2023)
- Girls' Golf - 2009 Class 2A State Champions
- Girls' Track and Field - 1995 Class 1A State Champions

== Notable alumni ==
- Jim Miller, offensive guard for the Atlanta Falcons
- Steven Sueppel, local banker and murderer

== See also ==
- List of high schools in Iowa
