= Paul–Helen Building =

- U.S. National Register of Historic Places
- U.S. Historic district – Contributing property
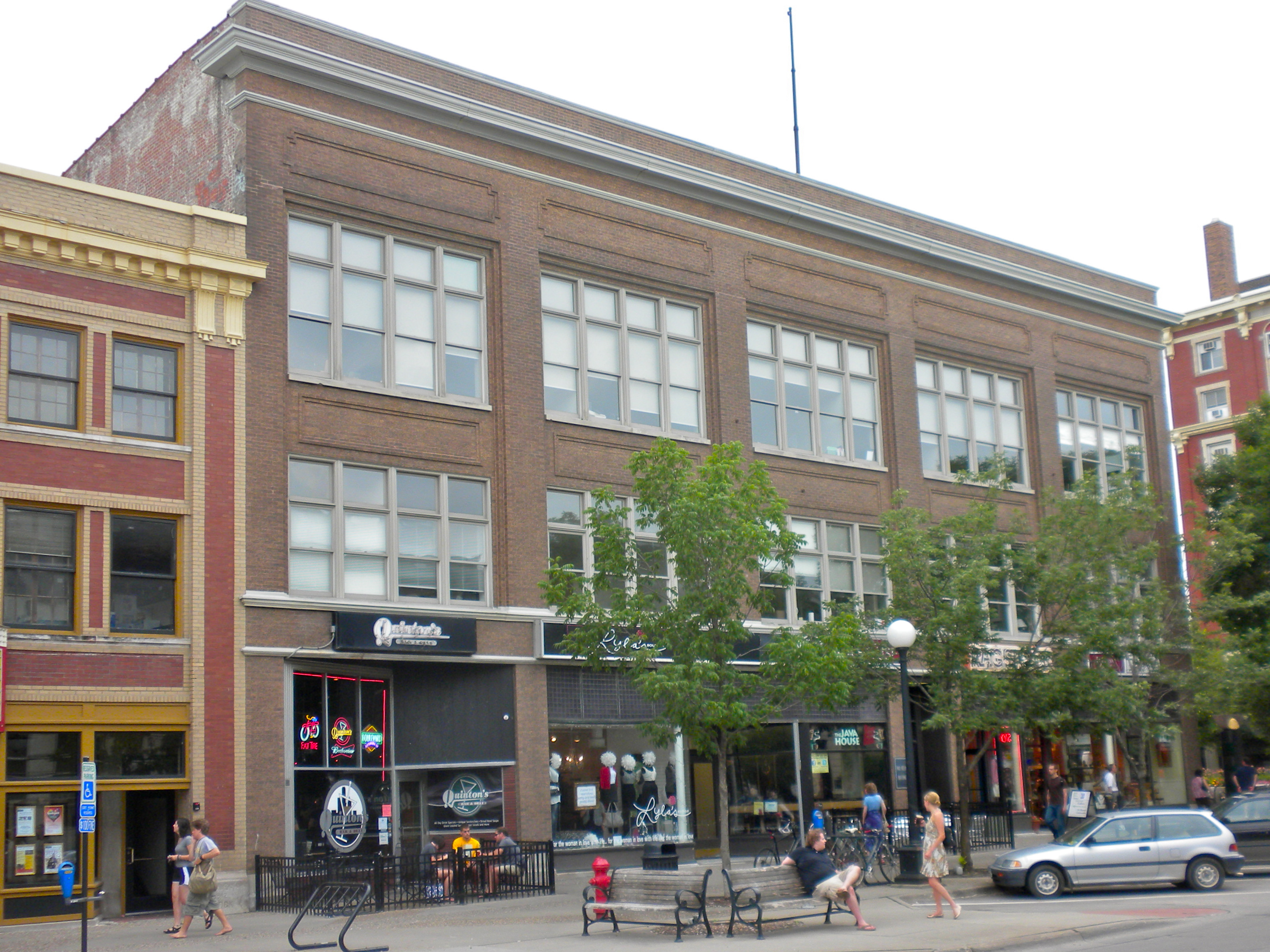

- Location within Iowa Location within the United States
- Location: 207–215 E. Washington, Iowa City, Iowa
- Coordinates: 41°39′35″N 91°31′57″W
- Built: 1910
- Architect: Frank X. Freyder (presumed)
- Architectural style: Chicago
- Part of: Iowa City Downtown Historic District (ID100006609)
- NRHP reference No.: 86000708
- Added to NRHP: April 10, 1986

The Paul–Helen Building is a historic building in downtown Iowa City, Iowa. The Chicago school building was the first part of a renewal of downtown Iowa City starting in the 1910s.

== History ==
The construction of the Paul–Helen Building coincided with a period of growth for Iowa City. The Paul–Helen was the first new building in the central business district in over 20 years. It is thought that it was designed and built by Frank X. Freyder, the owner of the Iowa City Planing & Molding Mill; Freyder designed several other city buildings of the era. The building was owned by the Schmidt–Kurz Improvement Company. G. W. Schmidt owned the Iowa City Iron Works and was an alderman. William Kurz owned a saloon on College Street. Charles A Schmidt owned a bakery on Clinton Street and a billiards parlor. When the Paul–Helen was completed, Kurz moved his establishment into one of the storefronts. The main tenant was the Iowa City Gas & Electric Company, who remained from its completion until the late 1970s. The building was named after the children of the Schmidt–Kurz Improvement Company partners. Construction began in April 1910 and finished that December. The building was individually listed on the National Register of Historic Places on April 10, 1986. In 2021, the building was included as a contributing property in the Iowa City Downtown Historic District.

== Architecture ==
The building was designed in the Chicago school. Typical of the style, the three-story building features steel framing. There are also Prairie School elements in the building with banded windows emphasizing the horizontal aspects. The cornice is likewise banded. It is adjacent to the Englert Theatre, completed three years later. The first floor has three retail spaces and the upper floors have office spaces.
