= Franklin Printing House =

- U.S. National Register of Historic Places
- U.S. Historic district – Contributing property
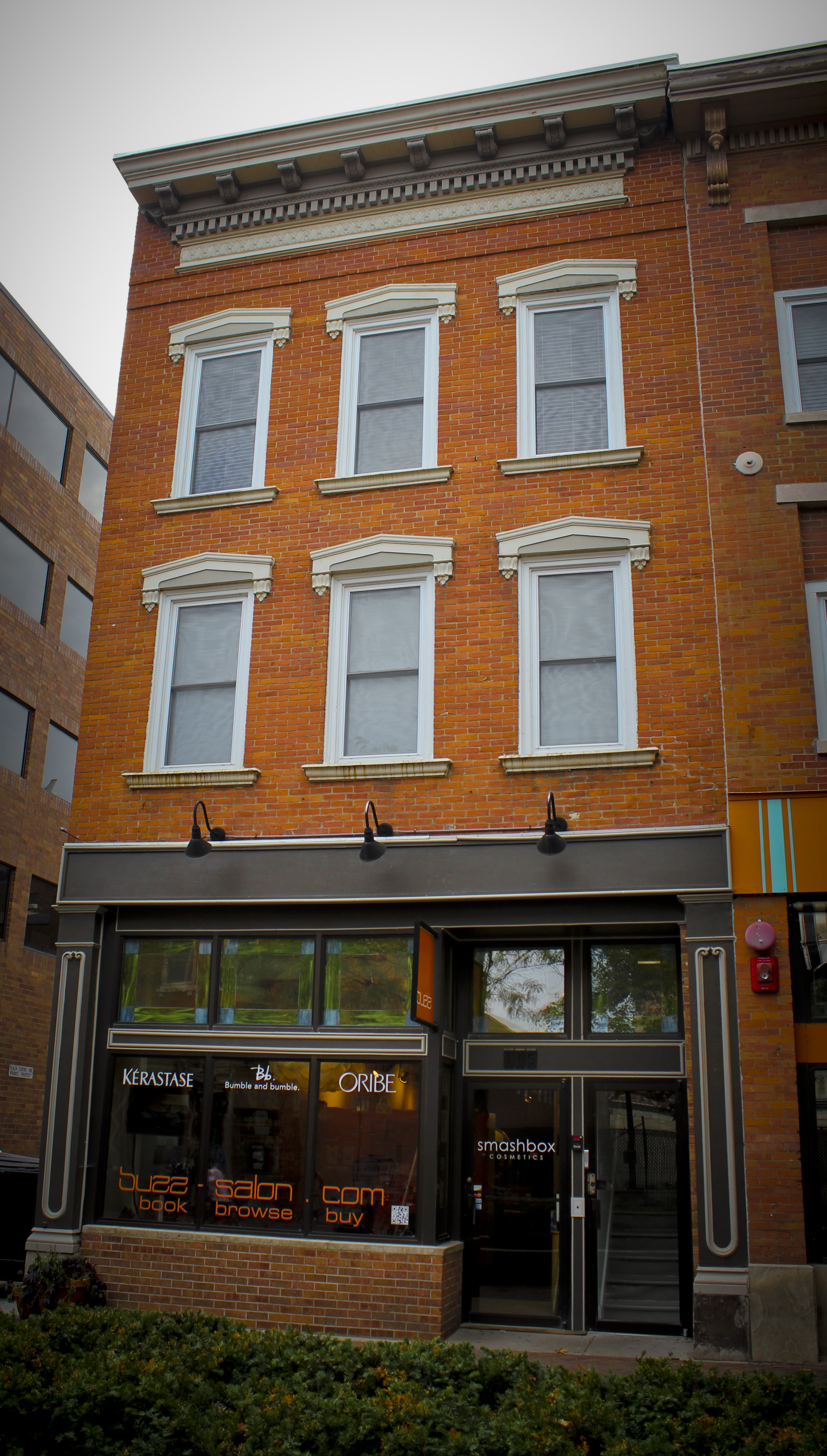

- Location within Iowa Location within the United States
- Location: 115 S. Dubuque St. Iowa City, Iowa
- Coordinates: 41°39′34.5″N 91°32′0.2″W
- Area: less than one acre
- Built: 1856
- Part of: Iowa City Downtown Historic District (ID100006609)
- NRHP reference No.: 86000712
- Added to NRHP: April 10, 1986

Franklin Printing House, also known as the Koza Building, is a historic building located in Iowa City, Iowa, United States. It was built in 1856 expressly for the purposes of housing the Iowa Capitol Reporter, a local newspaper named for when this was Iowa's capital city. The newspaper's offices were located on the main floor, the composition room was on the second floor, and printing press was in the basement. The Iowa Capitol Reporter was sold by the 1860s and the Iowa City Republican took over the building. They moved out in the mid-1870s, and the building housed a series of saloons into the 1890s. After it was occupied by a variety of businesses, the building housed John V. Koza's meat shop for about 40 years. The three-story brick building is considered an excellent example of pre-Civil War commercial architecture in Iowa City. The metal cornice across the top of the main facade dates from some time prior to 1904. The present storefront dates to a 1984 renovation, at which time the two cast iron columns were discovered. The building was individually listed on the National Register of Historic Places in 1986. In 2021, it was included as a contributing property in the Iowa City Downtown Historic District.
