= Coldren Opera House =

Former theater in Iowa City, Iowa, US

Coordinates: 41.6590°N 91.5346°W

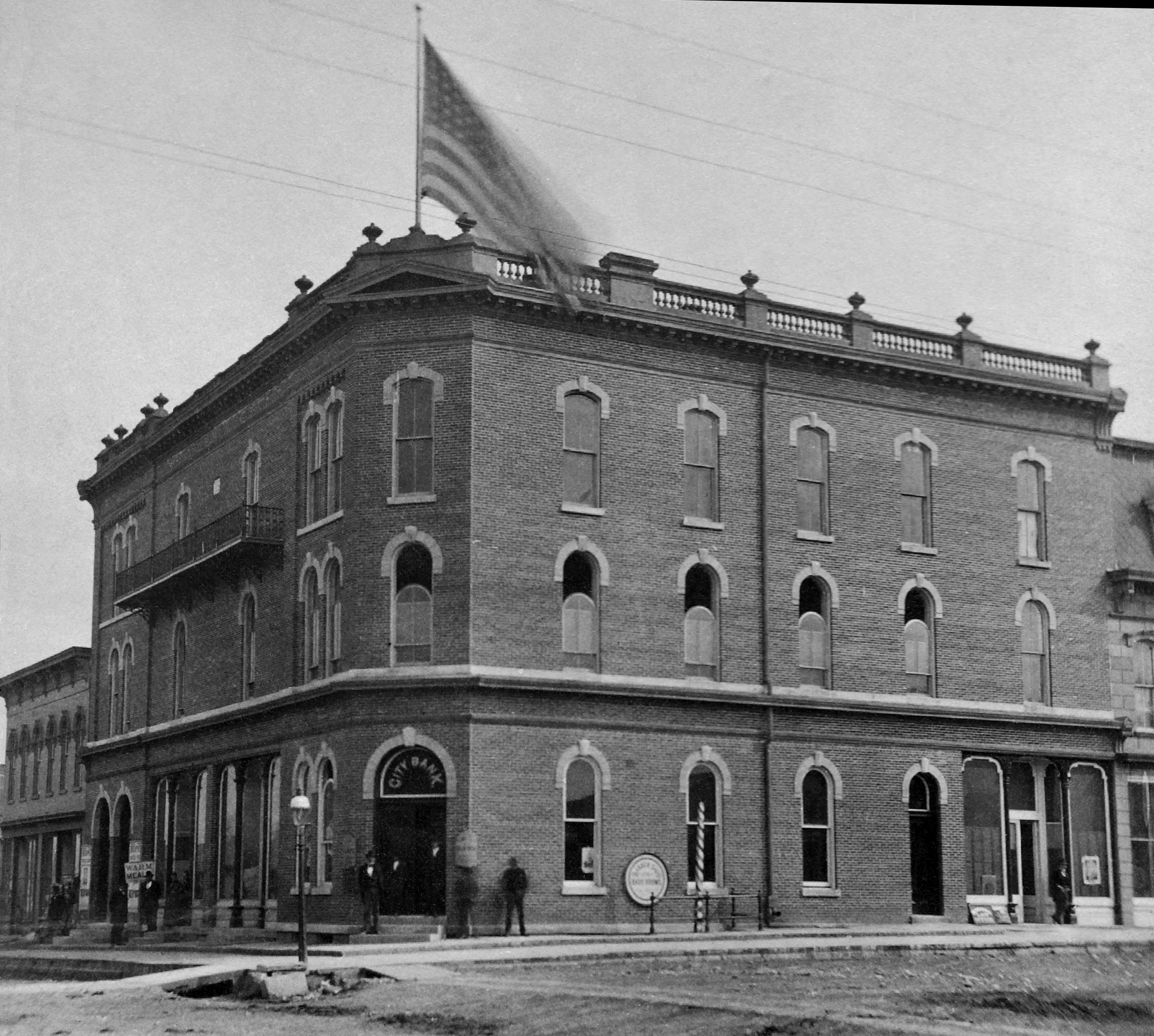
Iowa City Bank c. 1875; the Coldren Opera House occupied the second and third floors.

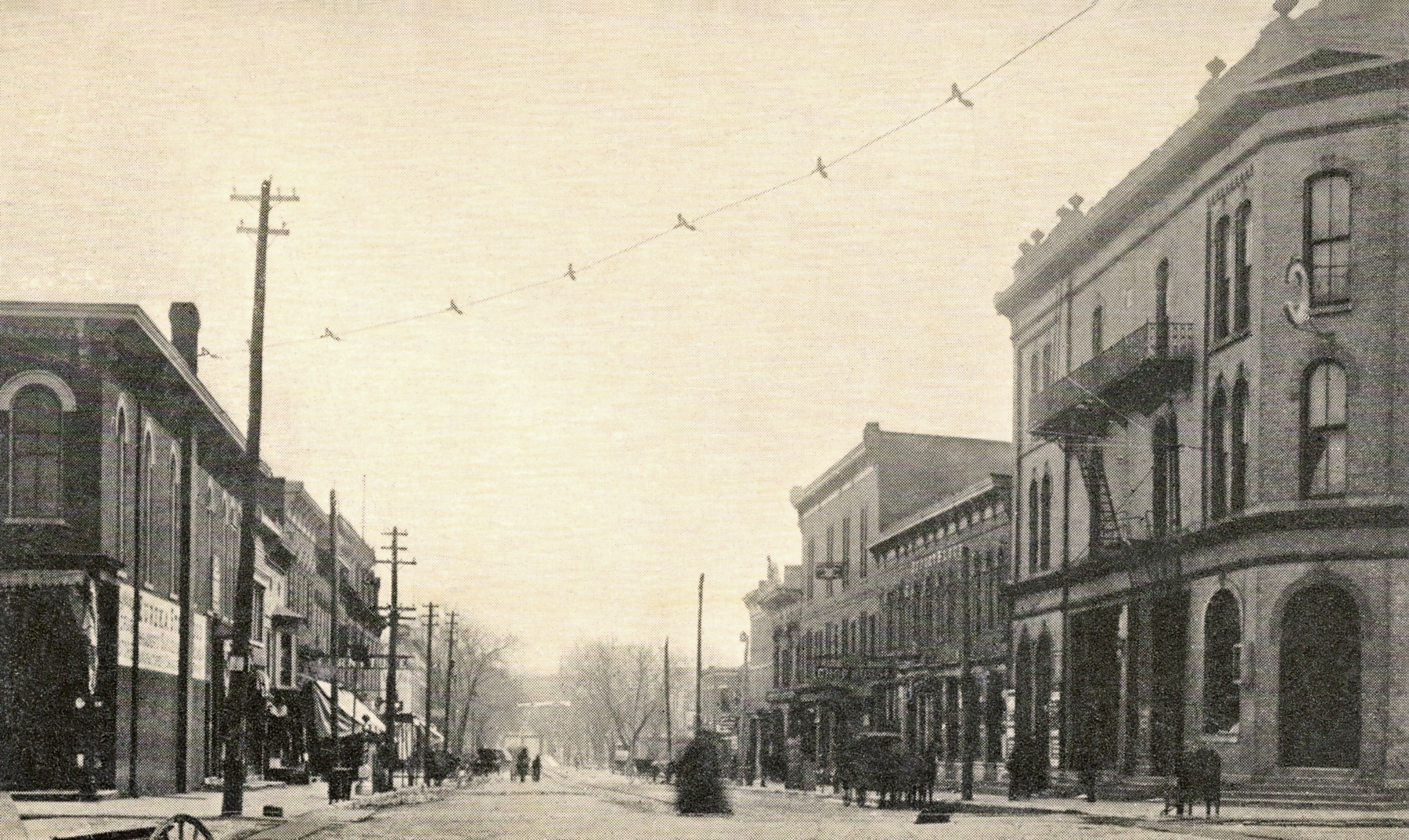
College Street seen from Clinton Street c. 1910; bank and opera house at right

The Coldren Opera House was a theater that operated in Iowa City, Iowa, United States, from 1877 to 1912. Its site at 105 College Street, at the corner of Clinton Street, is now covered by the Ped Mall.

== History ==
The Grand Opera House was built in 1876–77 to a design by Robert S. Finkbine. It was dedicated on November 2, 1877 and opened on November 6 and 7 with performances of How Women Love and Van the Virginian. It occupied the second and third floors of the Iowa City Bank building, on the site of the Clinton House, an auditorium that had been destroyed by fire in 1872. In addition to the bank, whose entrance was on the corner, the Opera House Bar was located in a first floor storefront on College Street. It became known as the Coldren Opera House after John N. Coldren, who served as sheriff of Iowa City from 1877 to 1882, purchased it from the bank's owners, Ezekiel Clark and Thomas Hill.

The auditorium, measuring 50 by 60 feet, had a capacity of 1,050 on three levels (parquet, dress circle, and gallery), almost 1,400 with the addition of chairs in the aisles. Following a fire, Coldren remodeled the interior in 1897 to seat 845. Beethoven, Meyerbeer, Mozart, and Wagner were depicted in oils at the four corners of the auditorium, and Shakespeare above the proscenium arch. The chandeliers and sconces and then state-of-the-art stage lighting gave the theater an excellent reputation.

The Opera House rarely if ever hosted opera performances; the name was used to avoid the less prestigious "theater". In addition to plays, it was used for many civic functions, including inaugurations of University of Iowa presidents. On April 27, 1882, Oscar Wilde lectured there on "The Decorative Arts" during a speaking tour of the United States.

The Coldren Opera House closed in 1912 following the opening of the Englert Theatre, which seated 1,079.
