= Boerner-Fry Company/Davis Hotel =

- U.S. National Register of Historic Places
- U.S. Historic district – Contributing property
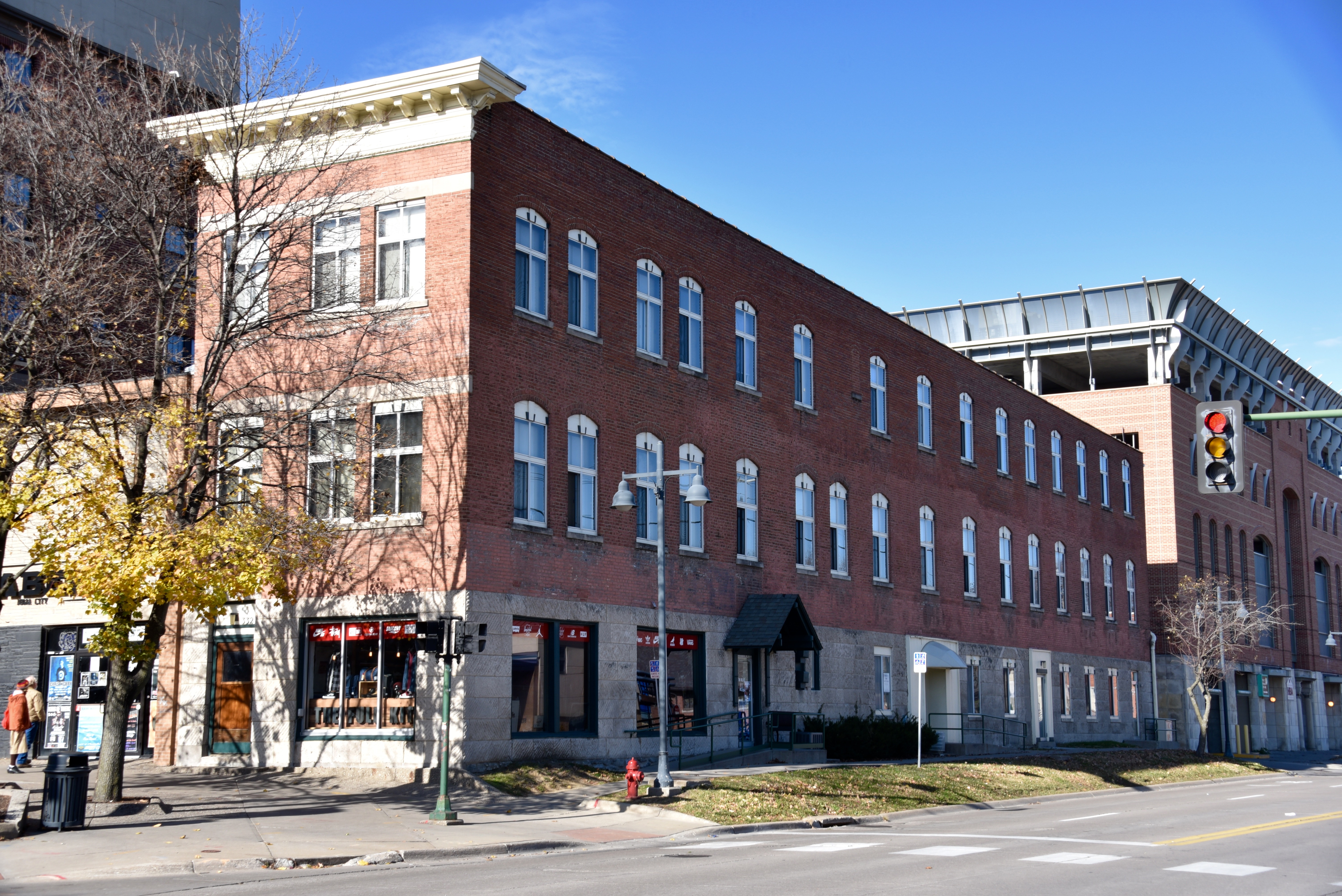

- Location within Iowa Location within the United States
- Location: 332 E. Washington St. Iowa City, Iowa
- Coordinates: 41°39′37.5″N 91°31′49.5″W
- Area: less than one acre
- Built: 1899
- Built by: Jacob J. Hotz
- Architectural style: Italianate
- Part of: Iowa City Downtown Historic District (ID100006609)
- NRHP reference No.: 83000377
- Added to NRHP: January 27, 1983

The Boerner-Fry Company/Davis Hotel is a historic building located in Iowa City, Iowa, United States. Emil Louis Boerner was born in Prussia and came to Iowa City with his family when he was 12. He was educated at the Philadelphia College of Pharmacy, and he owned and operated a drugstore in Iowa City for 57 years. He was also one of the primary organizers of the Iowa Pharmaceutical Association, a member of the faculty at the newly established Iowa College of Pharmacy in Des Moines, and was involved in establishing the Department of Pharmacy at the University of Iowa where he served as its first dean. Boerner and his partner William A. Fry had this building constructed in 1899 as a factory that produced toilet articles and light pharmaceuticals. Local contractor Jacob J. Hotz was responsible for its construction. The factory relocated to another facility in 1915, and went out of business the following year. This building was used for a variety of businesses until 1922 when it was converted into the Washington Hotel. George W. Davis renamed the hotel after himself in 1952, and he continued to operate it until 1972. It was then converted into office and retail space. The building was individually listed on the National Register of Historic Places in 1983. In 2021, it was included as a contributing property in the Iowa City Downtown Historic District.
