= Old Post Office (Iowa City, Iowa) =

- U.S. National Register of Historic Places
- U.S. Historic district – Contributing property
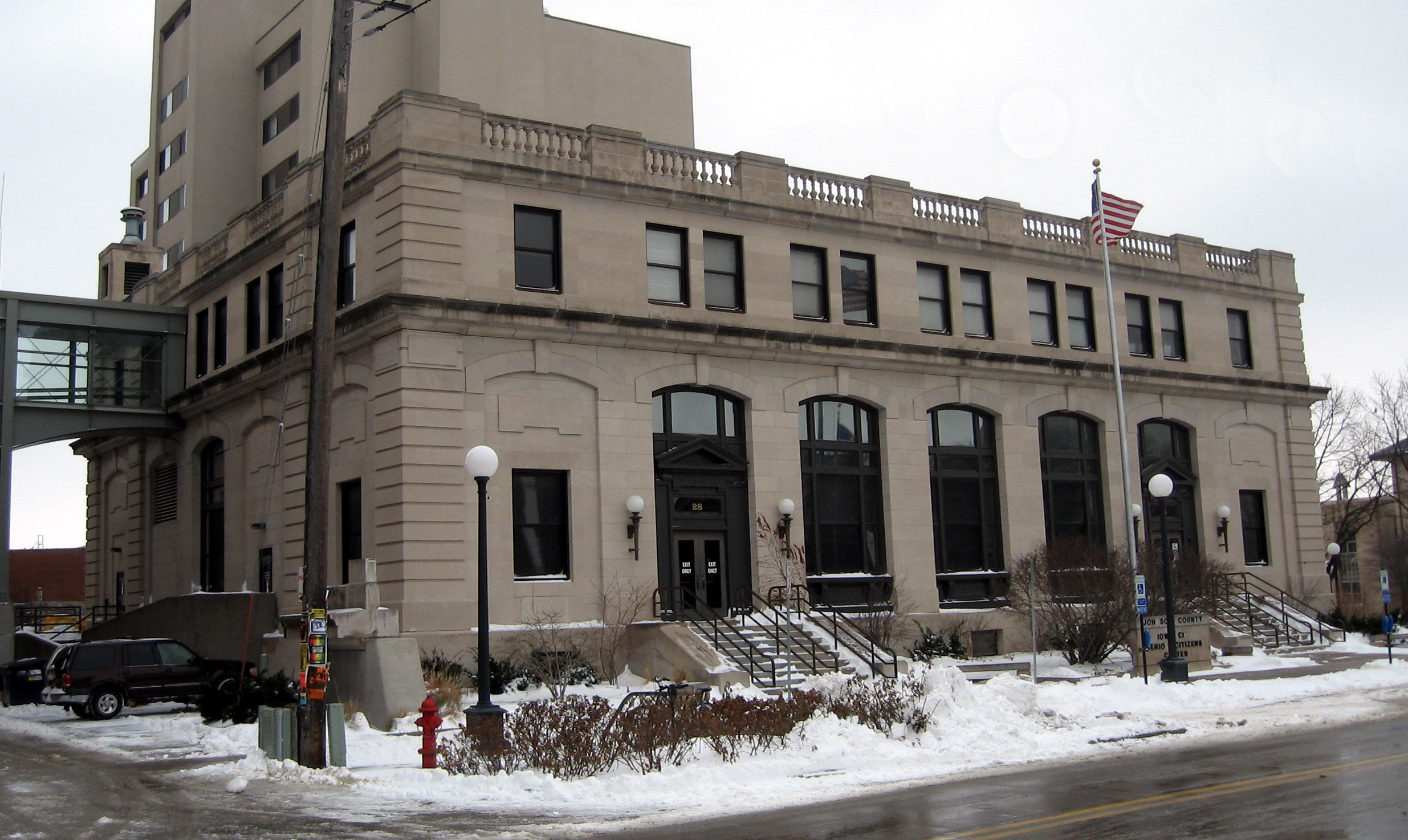

- Location within Iowa Location within the United States
- Location: 28 S. Linn St. Iowa City, Iowa
- Coordinates: 41°39′38″N 91°31′52″W
- Area: less than one acre
- Built: 1904, 1931
- Architectural style: Beaux Arts
- Part of: Iowa City Downtown Historic District (ID100006609)
- NRHP reference No.: 79000905
- Added to NRHP: April 17, 1979

The Old Post Office is a Beaux Arts-style building in downtown Iowa City, Iowa, United States. Built of Indiana Limestone in 1904, the post office was expanded in 1931. The addition was designed and built in such a way that it is indistinguishable from the original structure. It remained the city's central post office until 1975, when a new facility was built. After two years of vacancy, it was bought by the Iowa City/Johnson County Senior Center; it was selected over other sites due to its central location. Four years of renovations, concluded in September 1981, resulted in its opening as a senior center. On April 17, 1979, midway through the renovation, the building was individually listed on the National Register of Historic Places. Today, the center serves thousands of area residents monthly; nearly 90,000 visits were made to the center in 2003, of whom approximately 2/3 were lower-income. In 2021, the building was included as a contributing property in the Iowa City Downtown Historic District.

== See also ==
- List of United States post offices
