= Ped Mall (Iowa City) =

- City Plaza (Ped Mall)
- U.S. National Register of Historic Places
- U.S. Historic district – Contributing property
- Location within Iowa Location within the United States
- Location: E. College from S. Clinton to S. Linn and S. Dubuque from E. College to Iowa Avenue, Iowa City, Iowa
- Coordinates: 41°39′32.5″N 91°31′59.2″W
- Built: 1979
- Architect: Jack Leaman
- Architectural style: Urban Renewal Landscape Feature
- Part of: Iowa City Downtown Historic District
- NRHP reference No.: 100006609
- Added to NRHP: May 27, 2021

The Ped Mall, also known as the Pedestrian Mall, is a pedestrian mall located in downtown Iowa City, Iowa, near the University of Iowa campus. Officially named City Plaza it was completed in 1979 as the centerpiece of the city's urban renewal project. Landscaping was completed the following year. It was designed by Jack Leaman of Associated Engineers, Inc., in Mason City, Iowa. While pedestrian malls were a common feature of urban renewal projects in the United States, the Iowa City Ped Mall is one of the few that is still in existence. Spanning from Burlington Street to Washington Street and Clinton Street to Linn Street, the Ped Mall serves as a gathering place for students, locals, and transients. It draws large crowds for its summertime events such as the Friday Night Concert Series and the annual Iowa City Jazz Festival and Iowa City Arts Festival. The Ped Mall area also contains restaurants, bars, retail, hotels, the Riverside Theatre, a playground for children, and the Iowa City Public Library. The Coldren Opera House was located on the street which has now become the mall. In 2021, it was included as a contributing property in the Iowa City Downtown Historic District.

In April 2026, there was a shooting at the Ped Mall in which five people were shot, three of whom were University of Iowa Students. There were no fatalities.

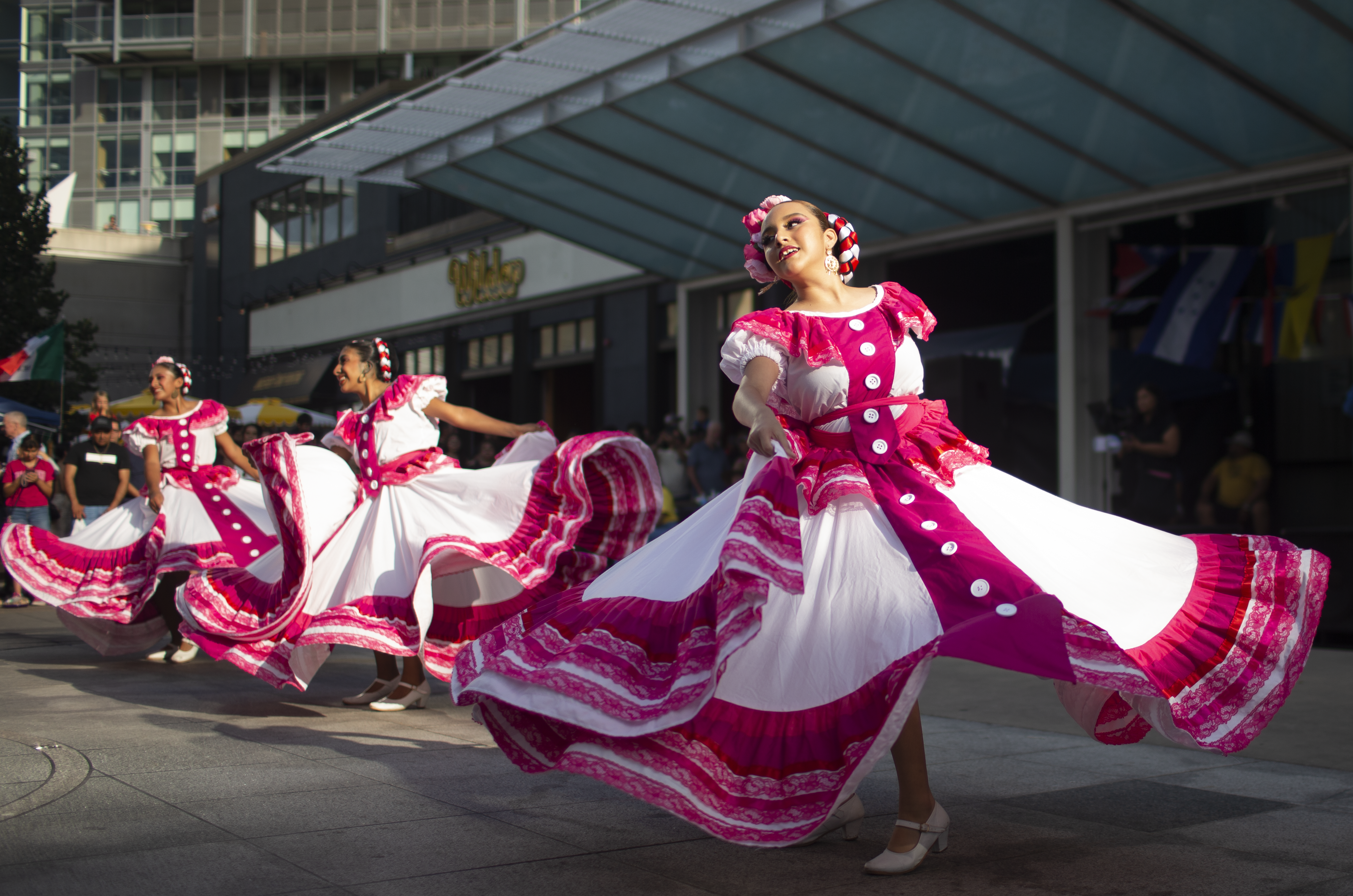
Performers from Ballet Folklorico Sones Mexicanos dance at the Iowa City Latino Fest in the Ped Mall on August 26, 2023.
