= Johnson County Savings Bank =

- U.S. National Register of Historic Places
- U.S. Historic district – Contributing property
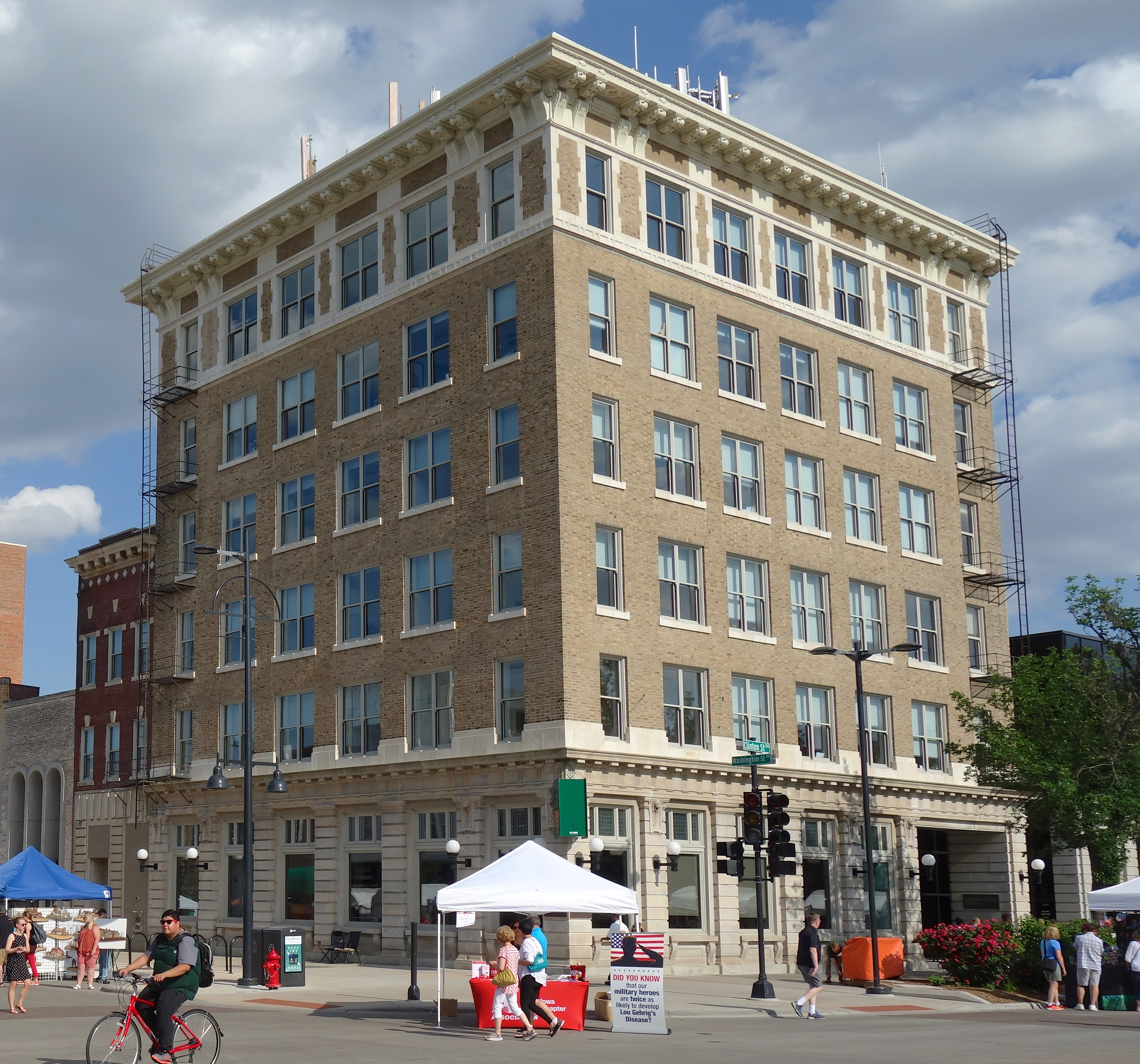

- Location within Iowa Location within the United States
- Location: 102 S. Clinton St.. Iowa City, Iowa
- Coordinates: 41°39′35.7″N 91°32′03.7″W
- Area: less than one acre
- Built: 1912
- Architectural style: Palazzo style
- Part of: Iowa City Downtown Historic District (ID100006609)
- NRHP reference No.: 100001580
- Added to NRHP: September 8, 2017

Johnson County Savings Bank, also known as Iowa State Bank, is a historic building located in Iowa City, Iowa, United States. Completed in 1912, it is a six-story, brick structure that rises to a height of 72.45 feet (22.08 m). The design of the structure shows the influence of the Chicago Commercial style of architecture and that of architect Louis Sullivan. These influences are found in the building's arrangement with a base, shaft, and capital. The decorative elements executed in stone and terra cotta show the influence of Neoclassical architecture. The building was individually listed on the National Register of Historic Places in 2017. In 2021, it was included as a contributing property in the Iowa City Downtown Historic District.
