= Trinity Episcopal Church (Iowa City, Iowa) =

- U.S. National Register of Historic Places
- U.S. Historic district – Contributing property
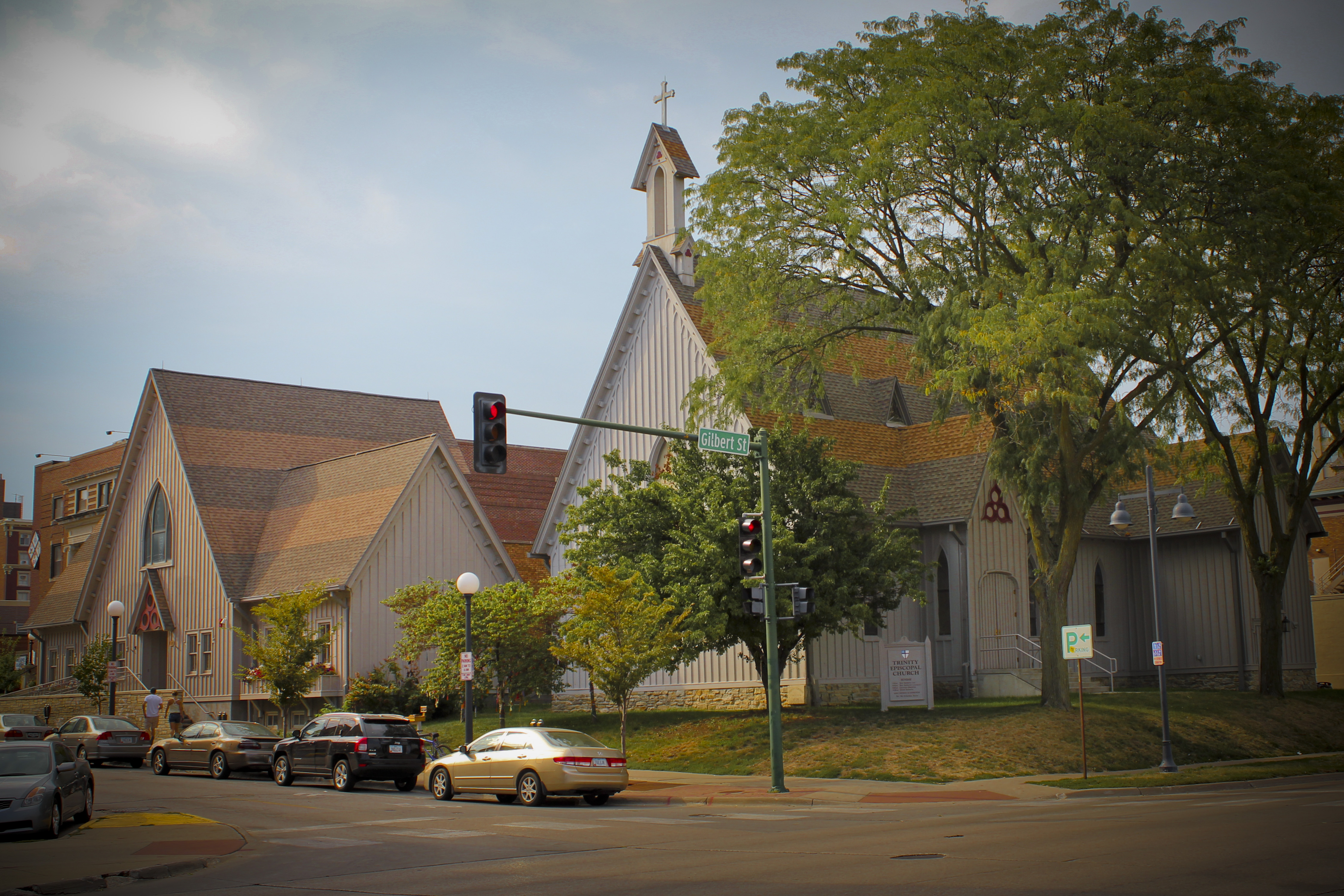

- Location within Iowa Location within the United States
- Location: 320 E. College St. Iowa City, Iowa
- Coordinates: 41°39′33″N 91°31′49″W
- Area: 0.8 acres (0.32 ha)
- Built: 1871
- Built by: James M. Sheets
- Architect: Richard Upjohn
- Architectural style: Gothic Revival; Carpenter Gothic
- Part of: Iowa City Downtown Historic District (ID100006609)
- NRHP reference No.: 74000793
- Added to NRHP: December 31, 1974

Trinity Episcopal Church is a parish church in the Episcopal Diocese of Iowa. The church is located in Iowa City, Iowa, United States. It was individually listed on the National Register of Historic Places in 1974. In 2021, the building was included as a contributing property in the Iowa City Downtown Historic District.

In 2017, the church reported 582 members; in 2023, it reported 272 members. No membership statistics were reported in 2024 national parochial reports. Plate and pledge financial support reported by the church in 2024 was $389,586. Average Sunday Attendance (ASA) reported in 2024 was 103 persons. This was a relative decrease from ASA of 186 persons reported in 2016.

== History ==
Trinity Church traces its roots to the missionary activities of the Rt. Rev. Jackson Kemper, Missionary Bishop of the Northwest, who first visited the area on July 10, 1841. He continued his visits until the parish was formed on August 7, 1853. The first rector of the church, the Rev. Willis H. Barris, came to Trinity on October 15, 1855. The Rev. Silas Totten who was rector from 1859 to 1862, served as the second President of the University of Iowa at the same time. The parish had no regular meeting place until 1862, when it purchased the Athenaeum. That building was used for church purposes until the present church was completed on October 1, 1871. The Athenaeum building was later sold to St. Patrick's Catholic Church when it was established in 1873.

The present church building was built on property purchased from Samuel and Sarah Ballard in 1868. The design for the church is attributed to Richard Upjohn. It is not known if the plans came directly from Upjohn, or if they were from drawings found in his Rural Architecture. There is also some evidence that it resembles a drawing by Bishop Randall of Colorado that was published in The Spirit of Missions in May 1867. The church is a wood structure in the Gothic Revival style. It is considered significant as the only Gothic Revival building in Iowa City that utilizes vertical boarding that is often used in this form of the style. While the sanctuary remains similar to the day it was built, additions for educational facilities and a parish hall have been added over the years.
