= College Block Building =

- U.S. National Register of Historic Places
- U.S. Historic district – Contributing property
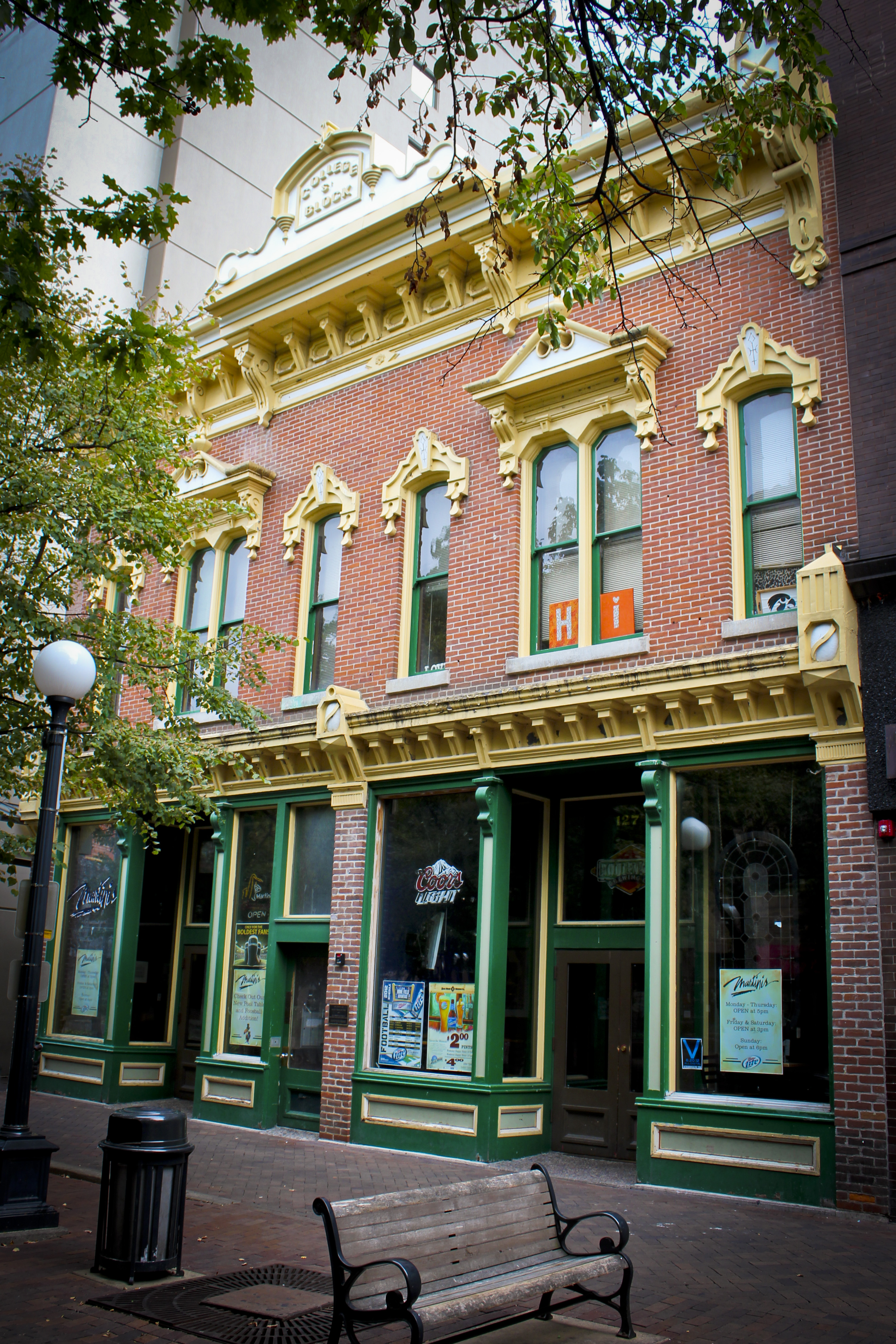

- Location within Iowa Location within the United States
- Location: 125 E. College St. Iowa City, Iowa
- Coordinates: 41°39′31.5″N 91°32′0.8″W
- Area: less than one acre
- Built: 1883; 143 years ago
- Architect: Chauncey F. Lovelace
- Architectural style: Italianate
- Part of: Iowa City Downtown Historic District (ID100006609)
- NRHP reference No.: 73000728
- Added to NRHP: July 23, 1973

The College Block Building is a historic building located in Iowa City, Iowa, United States. Completed in 1883, this is the first known architect-designed commercial building in Iowa City. It was designed by local architect Chauncey F. Lovelace, who moved his office into the building. The main facade of this two-story brick structure is capped with an ornate, bracketed, tin cornice with the words "College Block" on an ornamented crest. There are eight windows on the second floor, all with ornate window hoods. The second and third windows on both ends are coupled together under a larger hood. The main floor is occupied by commercial space, and the second floor contains apartments. Urban renewal threatened the building's existence in the 1970s. It was individually listed on the National Register of Historic Places in 1973. In 2021, the building was included as a contributing property in the Iowa City Downtown Historic District.
