= Iowa City Downtown Historic District =

Historic district in Iowa, United States

- U.S. National Register of Historic Places
- U.S. Historic district
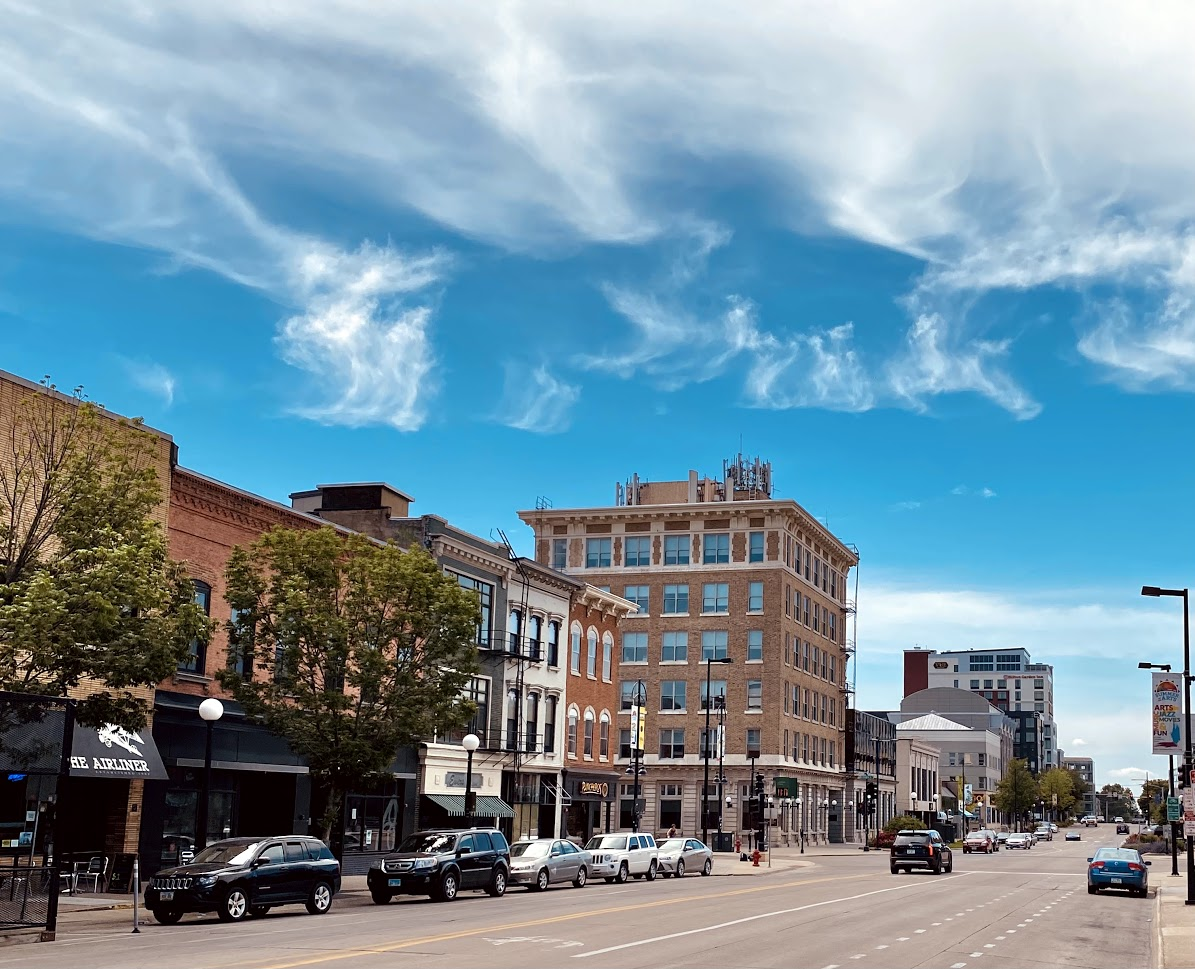
- Buildings on the east side of South Clinton Street.

- Location within Iowa Location within the United States
- Location: South Clinton to South Gilbert Sts., Iowa Ave. to alley south of East College St., Iowa City, Iowa
- Coordinates: 41°39′36″N 91°31′56″W
- Area: 25 acres (10 ha)
- NRHP reference No.: 100006609
- Added to NRHP: May 27, 2021

The Iowa City Downtown Historic District is a nationally recognized historic district located in Iowa City, Iowa, United States. It was listed on the National Register of Historic Places in 2021. At the time of its nomination it consisted of 102 resources, which included 73 contributing buildings, one contributing site, one contributing object, 21 non-contributing buildings, and seven non-contributing objects. Eight buildings that were previously listed on the National Register are also included in the district. Iowa City's central business district developed adjacent to the Iowa Old Capitol Building and the main campus of the University of Iowa. This juxtaposition gives the area its energy with the overlap of university staff and students and the local community. The district was significantly altered in the 1970s by the city's urban renewal effort that brought about the Ped Mall (City Plaza), which transformed two blocks of College Street from Clinton Street to Linn Street and Dubuque Street from Burlington Street to Washington Street. It is the contributing site and the large planters/retaining walls that are original to the project are counted together as the contributing object. There are also several freestanding, limestone planters, five contemporary sculptures, and a playground area are the non-contributing objects.

The district mainly contains commercial buildings that were built in the Early Classical Revival, the revival styles of the Late Victorian era, the Chicago Commercial Style, Art Deco, and the Art Moderne styles. Modern architecture was introduced in the urban renewal years when new buildings were constructed and storefronts renovated. Architects of regional and local importance with buildings in the district include Chauncey Lovelace, Iowa City; Proudfoot & Bird and their successor firm of Proudfoot, Bird & Rawson, Des Moines; Dieman & Fiske, Cedar Rapids, Iowa; Liebbe, Nourse & Rasmussen, Des Moines; Vorse, Kraetsch & Kraetsch, Des Moines; H.L. Stevens & Company, Chicago; Kruse and Klein of Davenport, Iowa; and J. Bradley Rust, Iowa City. The Franklin Printing House (1856), Trinity Episcopal Church (1871), College Block Building (1883), Boerner-Fry Company/Davis Hotel (1899), Old Post Office (1904, 1931), Paul–Helen Building (1910), Englert Theatre (1912), and Johnson County Savings Bank (1912) are individually listed on the National Register of Historic Places.
