= Englert Theatre =

Theater and arts center in Iowa City, Iowa

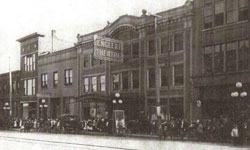
- Englert Theatre displays its original 1912 face along Washington Street, enhanced later by alterations to its dark canopy, and signage seen outside its third level.
- Interactive map of Englert Theatre
- Address: 221 Washington Street
- Location: Iowa City, Iowa
- Owner: Englert Civic Theatre
- Capacity: 725
- Type: Performing arts center

Construction
- Built: 1912
- Renovated: 2004

Website
- www.englert.org
- Englert Theatre
- U.S. National Register of Historic Places
- U.S. Historic district – Contributing property
- Location within Iowa Location within the United States
- Coordinates: 41°39′35″N 91°31′56″W
- Architect: Vorse, Kraitsch, & Kraitsch, Wiley & Son
- Architectural style: Renaissance, Tudor Revival
- Part of: Iowa City Downtown Historic District (ID100006609)
- NRHP reference No.: 01000911
- Added to NRHP: August 30, 2001

Englert Theatre in Iowa City, Iowa, is a renovated vaudeville-era playhouse now serving as a community arts center and 725-seat performance venue. It is owned and operated year around by Englert Civic Theatre, a non-profit art organization. The building was individually listed on the National Register of Historic Places in 2001. In 2021, it was included as a contributing property in the Iowa City Downtown Historic District.

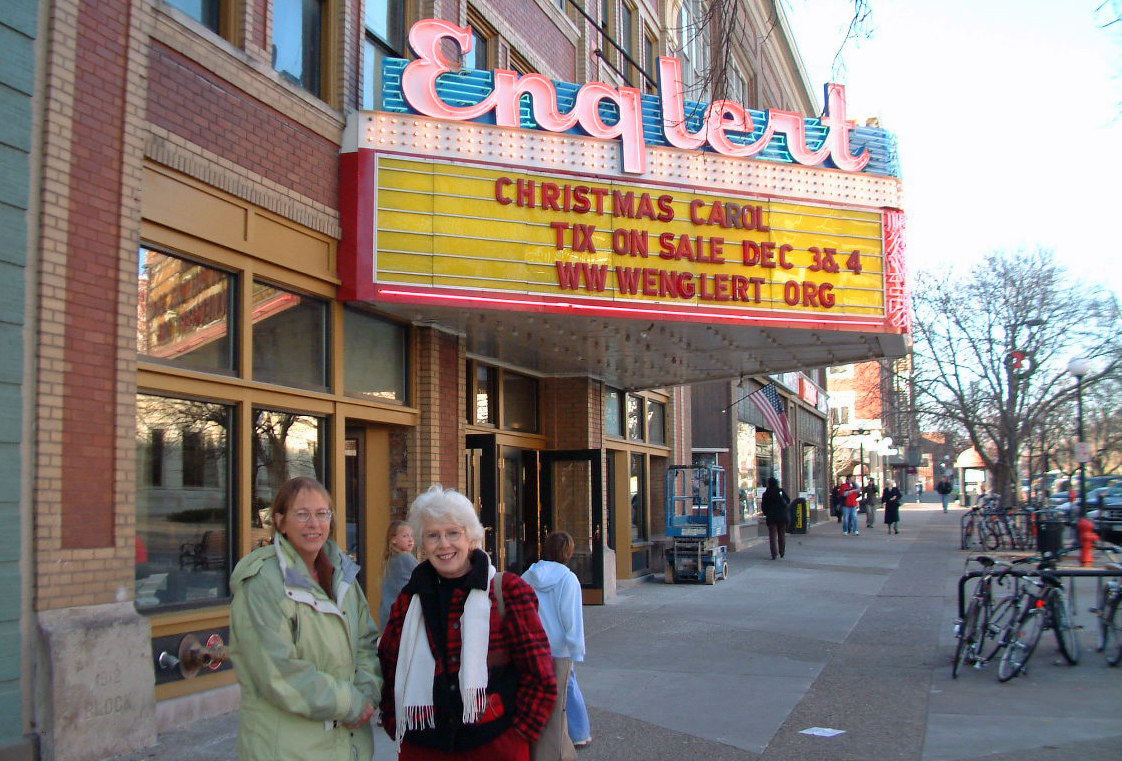
The canopy at the reopening matinee of Englert Civic Theatre on Friday December 3, 2004.

The theater hosts a variety of events including live music, comedy, dance, plays, lectures, film screenings, civic events, public and private ceremonies such as awards and anniversary celebrations, and more.

== History ==
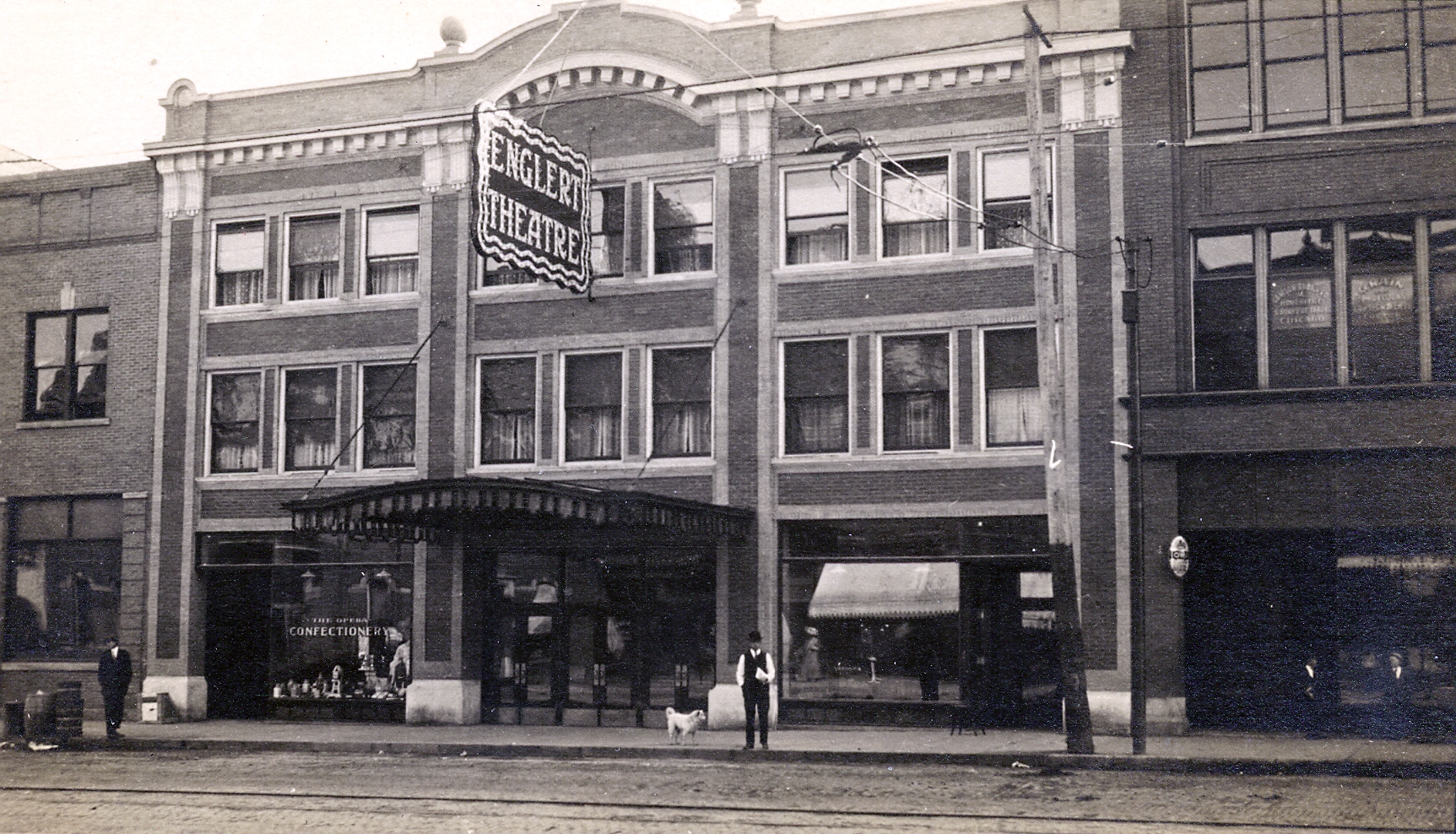
A new Englert Theatre on Washington Street in downtown Iowa City during 1912. The original sign hangs outside the third-floor level.

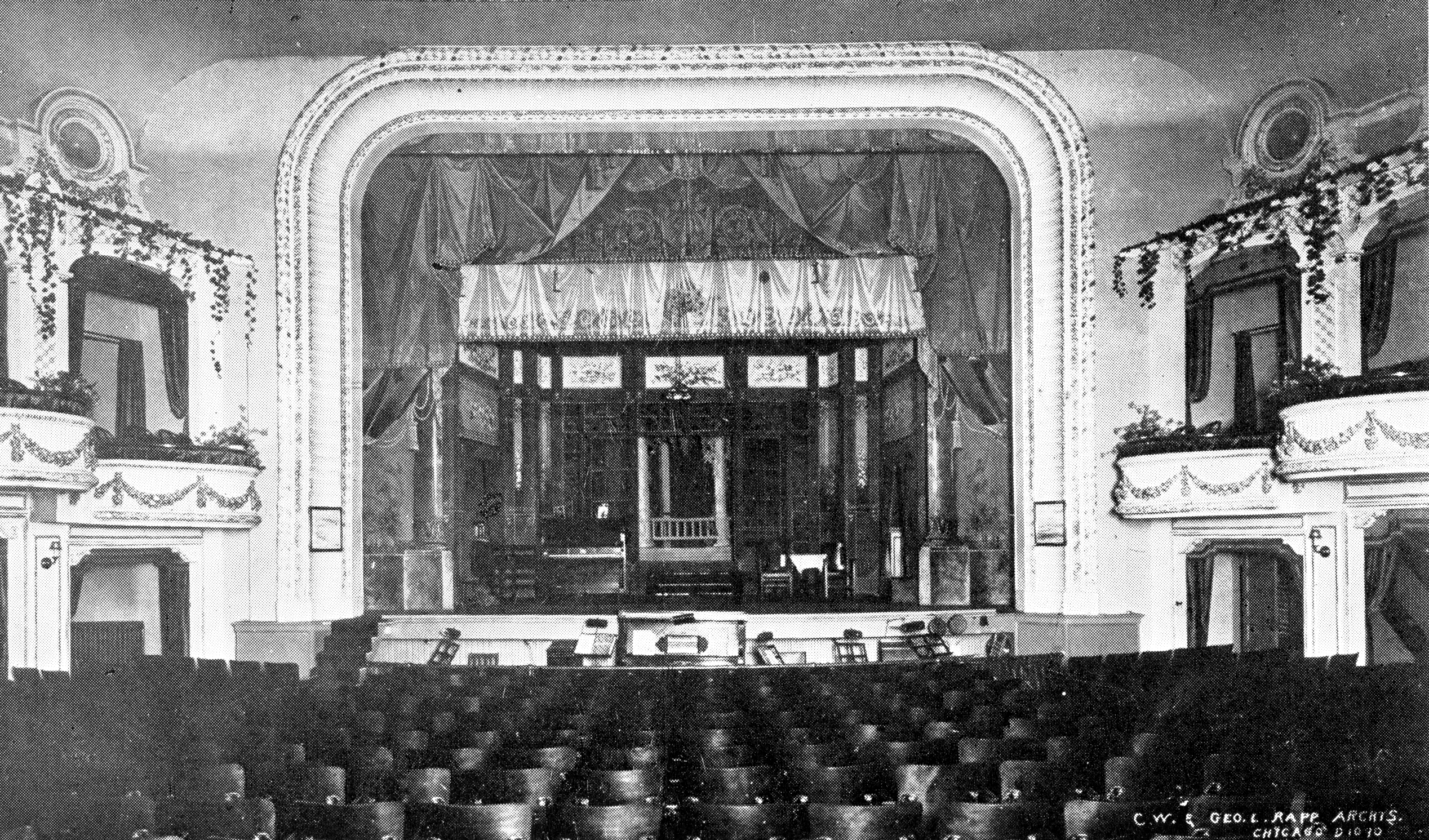
The original interior of Englert Theatre as shown in an advertisement in the 1918 Iowa City High School annual (yearbook). It features the early orchestra pit, and original box seating along the sidewalls.

The original Englert Theatre was opened September 26, 1912, featuring a local eight-piece orchestra whose leader Punch (Albert C.) Dunkel and his brother Charles co-owned another local movie house, Pastime Theatre (later called Capitol Theatre).

When opened, the Englert seated 1,079 with side aisles, and without a center aisle. College students and faculty and town residents often attended performances; the theater was the only of its kind in Iowa City.

An opening night performance was a Thomas W. Ross & Co. play production of The Only Son, which less than two years later was filmed under the same name, co-directed by Cecil B. DeMille.

== Construction ==
The original theater building was constructed at a cost of about $60,000 (equal to $1.5 million in 2012 dollars) by Will (William H., 1874–1920) and Etta Chopek Englert (1883–1952), both already prominent in operating other local businesses—he Englert Ice Co. at 315 Market Street, now a parking lot, and she the Bon Ton Cafe at 24-26 South Dubuque Street, where they lived upstairs. The cafe building now serves as part of the remodeled western Dubuque Street face of the US Bank building.

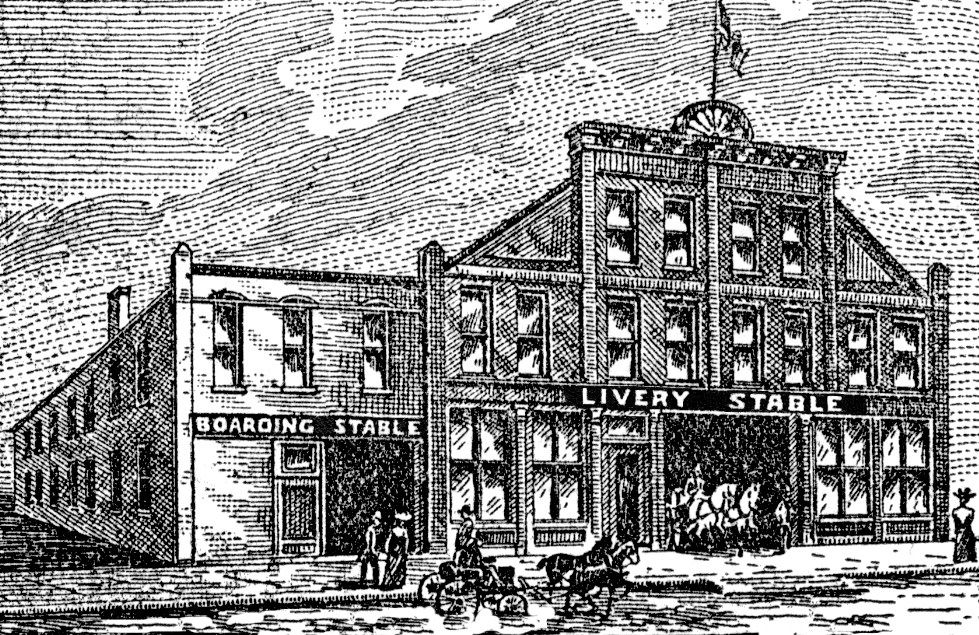
The future Englert Theatre site prior to a fire about 1905 was occupied by a livery stable with a faux three-story front façade and adjoining boarding livery at left on ground level and hotel upstairs. Subsequent rebuilding was limited to a smaller, but taller hotel on the opposite side of the site, and a minimal stable, all perhaps salvaged from ruins. This image appears in an advertisement in a locally prepared and published 1904 Directory of Iowa City.

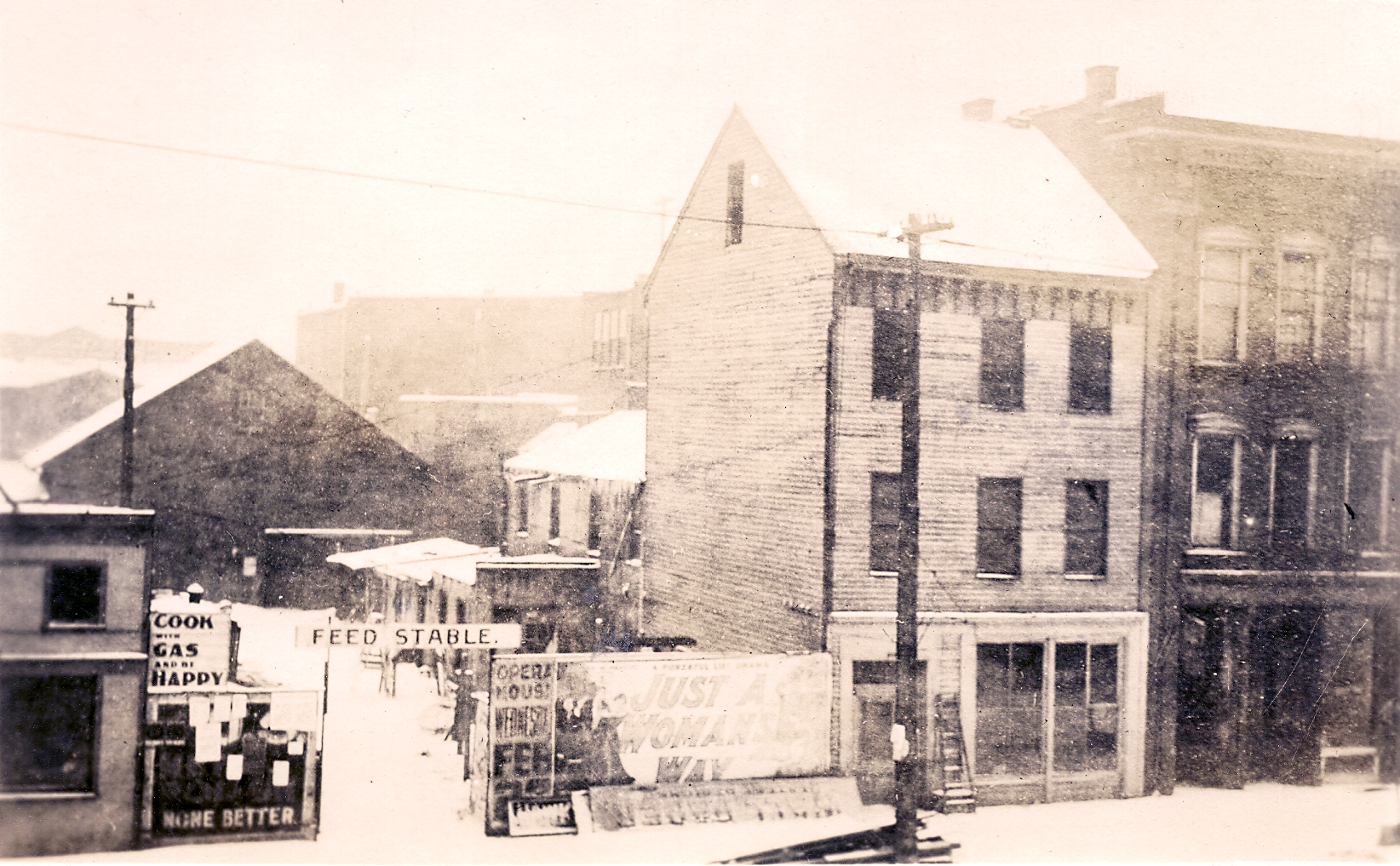
Foster, Graham & Schaffer livery stable appears about 1907 or 1908 on part of the future Englert Theatre site. The stable operated from the open area and sheds beside and behind the Schaffer Hotel building in this image which appears on a photographic postcard sold during that era. The dark structure at right was replaced by the Paul-Helen building during 1910-11.

The new Englert occupied a site that previously served Foster, Graham & Schaffer livery stable, and the adjoining Schaffer Hotel. The livery-hotel property had suffered a major fire during the brief period between the two accompanying images, and had been only minimally restored without rebuilding a huge barn-type stable, and providing a smaller hotel structure, although the new one boasted three levels as opposed to two much longer levels of the fire-destroyed "boarding livery" with its second level sleeping rooms.

With completion of their new theater building, the Englerts moved around the Dubuque-Washington streets corner from above their Bon Ton Cafe into an apartment overlooking Washington Street from the second and third floors at the front of their new structure.

Englert Theatre screened the first talkie motion picture displayed in Iowa City on June 9, 1928, of a first run (film) titled The Jazz Singer featuring Al Jolson, the first sound film to be originally presented in that format. It had been premiered in New York City in October 1927. Early road show movies presented at the Englert such as The Covered Wagon (1923) and All Quiet on the Western Front (1930 film) were accompanied by up to 60-piece orchestras.

Former Iowa City Mayor William C. Hubbard (1966–67) and city councilman (1962–67) who is considered "the father of urban renewal in Iowa City," and a 1943 graduate of Iowa City High School, recalled that after City High was moved into a new building during 1939 Englert Theatre donated a considerable supply of its used stage props and set decorations to the school for use in what subsequently was named Iver Opstad Auditorium in the school. The Englert was managed at that time by Louis and Albert Davis.

== Performance History ==
During its commercial operation, vaudeville acts on national tours made regular stops at Englert Theatre. The Englert stage saw notables as Ethel Barrymore, Ed Wynn, Lynn Fontanne, and Sarah Bernhardt perform.

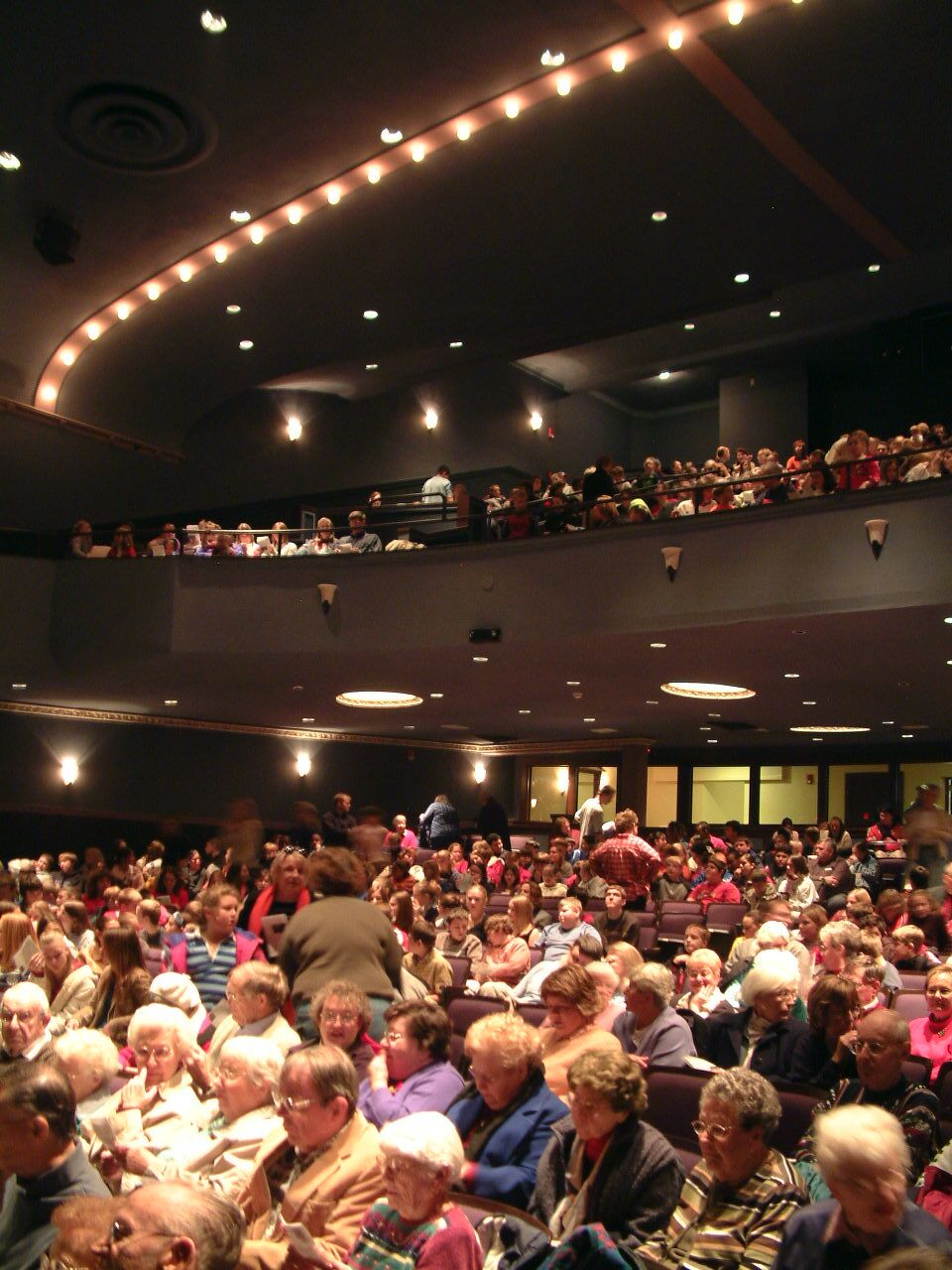
An audience gathers December 3, 2004 for the opening matinee of a refurbished Englert.

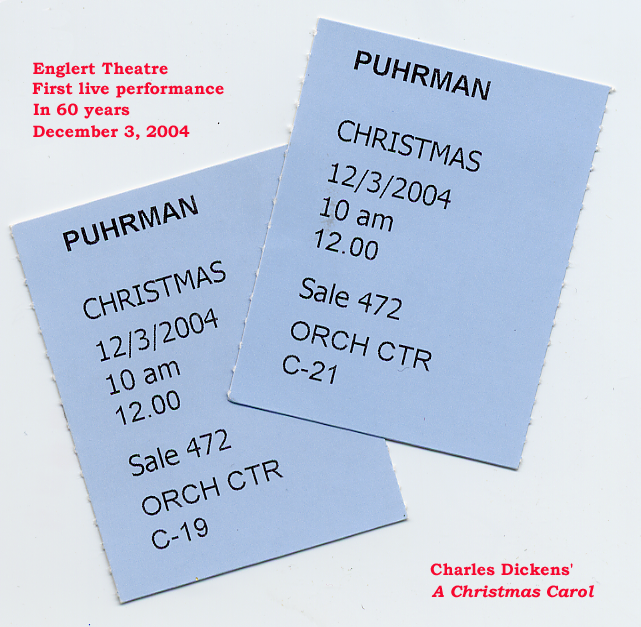
Souvenir ticket stubs from the first performance, a matinee, of the non-profit Englert Civic Theatre

Since its re-opening as a non-profit theater in the modern era, efforts to keep the refurbished facility fully utilized included a use through a 2004 agreement with the University of Iowa for up to 40 nights each year. The Englert currently typically has live events about 225 nights annually.

The Englert also has hosted groups and performers such as The Second City, Paula Poundstone, New Orleans Jazz Orchestra, Greg Brown, and many others. The theater also is the primary venue for Landlocked Film Festival.

== Other Movie Houses in Iowa City ==
The Englerts purchased a lot on Washington Street and built yet another motion picture venue, Garden Theatre. They opened it in June 1915, charging an admission of 5¢, equal to about $1.25 during 2012. Unlike the Englert, Garden Theatre was purely a movie venue, with a minimal stage and without an orchestra pit or tall scenery storage area.

A decade later, a fire that started in an upstairs cafe seriously damaged that foodservice and the adjoining rooms housing the State Historical Society of Iowa, although the Garden continued operations on the main level with little damage. It eventually was remodeled into Varsity Theatre (1932–1960), which became Astro Theatre; Astro Theatre closed in 1991 as local movie houses took hold in outlying shopping centers. The Garden, Varsity and Astro Theatre site later became the site for an expansion and renovation of First National Bank, now US Bank.

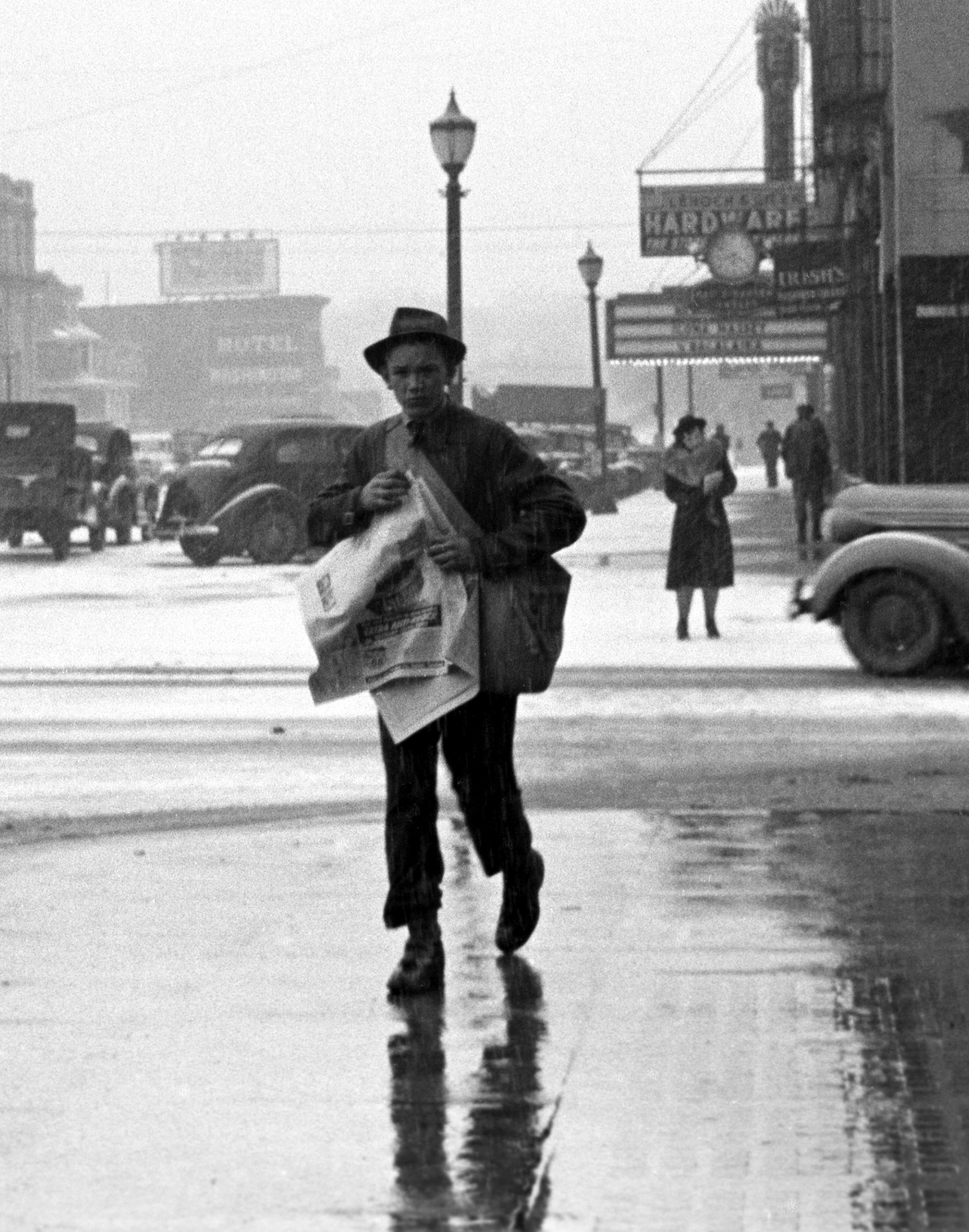
The Englert Theater canopy is visible in the background right of a newspaper carrier in 1940 along Washington Street, recorded by the camera of renowned photographer Arthur Rothstein.

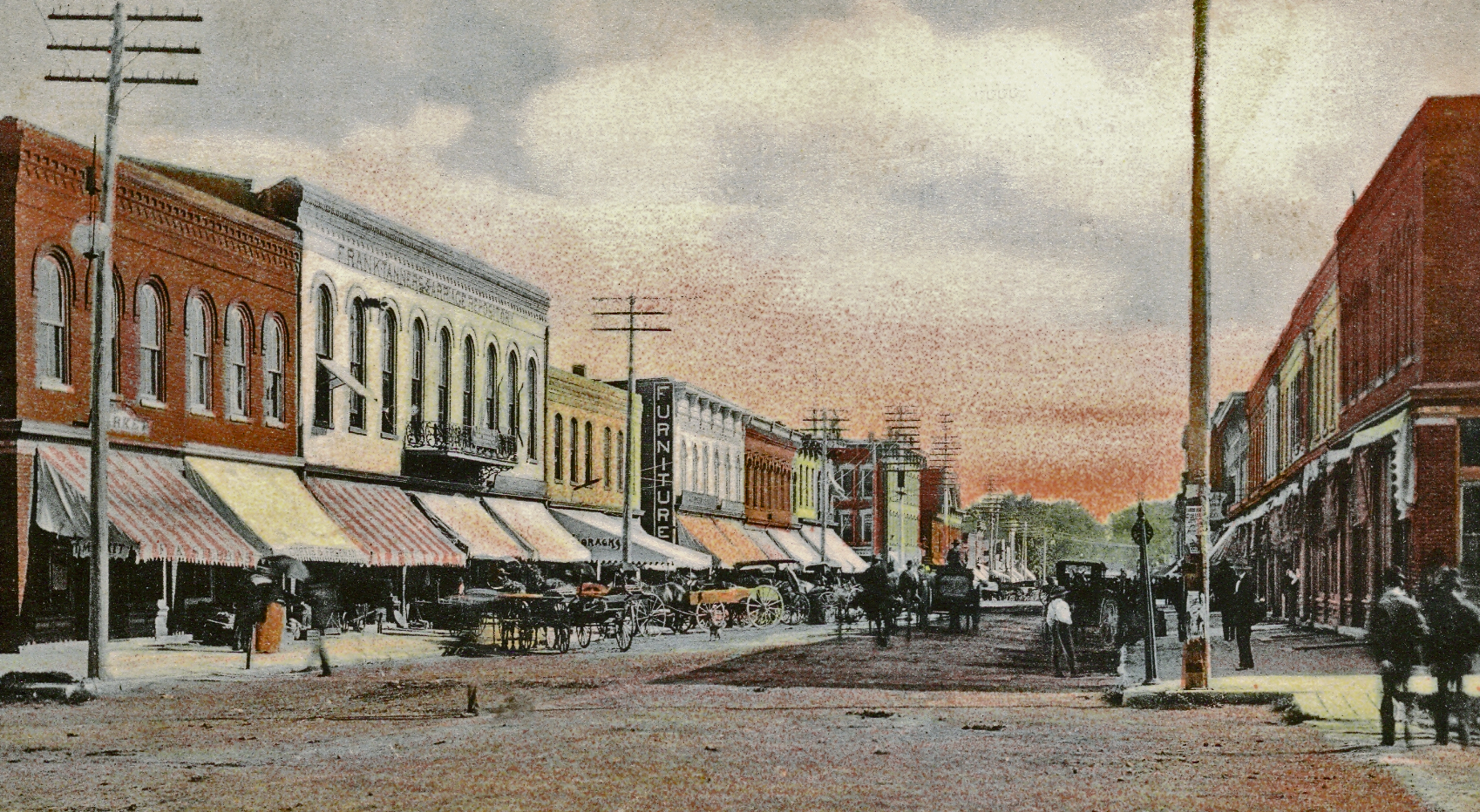
Looking south on Iowa Avenue along Dubuque toward the Englert family's Bon Ton cafe at 24-26 South Dubuque Street. The cafe appears as a brownish-colored building on the east (left) face near the center of this 1907 postcard image.

In addition to Pastime Theatre (later Capitol) noted above, other movie houses in downtown Iowa City during the 20th century included Strand Theatre in the old Mendenhall Block along the south face of College Street about where the check-in desk in the Sheraton Hotel now is located. The Strand was razed by fire about 1961.

Another was Iowa Theatre along the Dubuque streetscape adjacent to what now is the west face of the Iowa City Public Library building. The Iowa Theatre structure was transformed during 1983 into a two-level fast-food franchised burger joint, and subsequently into other uses.

In 1946 there were five operating full-time in downtown Iowa City, including Englert, Iowa, New Pastime, Strand, and Varsity, but none yet had sprouted in outlying malls.

The first outlying theater to be built was Iowa City Drive-In Theatre, which actually was located along the then northwest edge of Coralville, now site of the Coralville City Hall, police, fire, and library buildings, plus some privately owned apartment structures along its northern edge. It was opened about 1949.

A mall-type three-screen cinema multiplex landed in downtown Iowa City during 1983 with opening of the Campus III theaters adjacent to the university campus in a new Old Capitol Mall, which initially housed a large two-level Younkers department store, as well as an outsized Osco Drug. Now called Old Capitol Town Center, the second-level theater space currently is occupied by University of Iowa uses, as is much of the other space in the center.

== Englert Family ==
The locally prominent Englert family was based in nineteenth century patriarch Louis, who in 1853 opened and operated City Brewery at 315 Market Street, the original of three historic Iowa City breweries which together served the large local German and Bohemian populations with enough capacity for a large portion of eastern Iowa. Louis' son John developed a successful ice (winter cut, summer sales) and wood (summer cut, winter sales) business, which Will and his half brothers Clarence (Bumps) and John (Jack) eventually ran jointly as their father's successors.

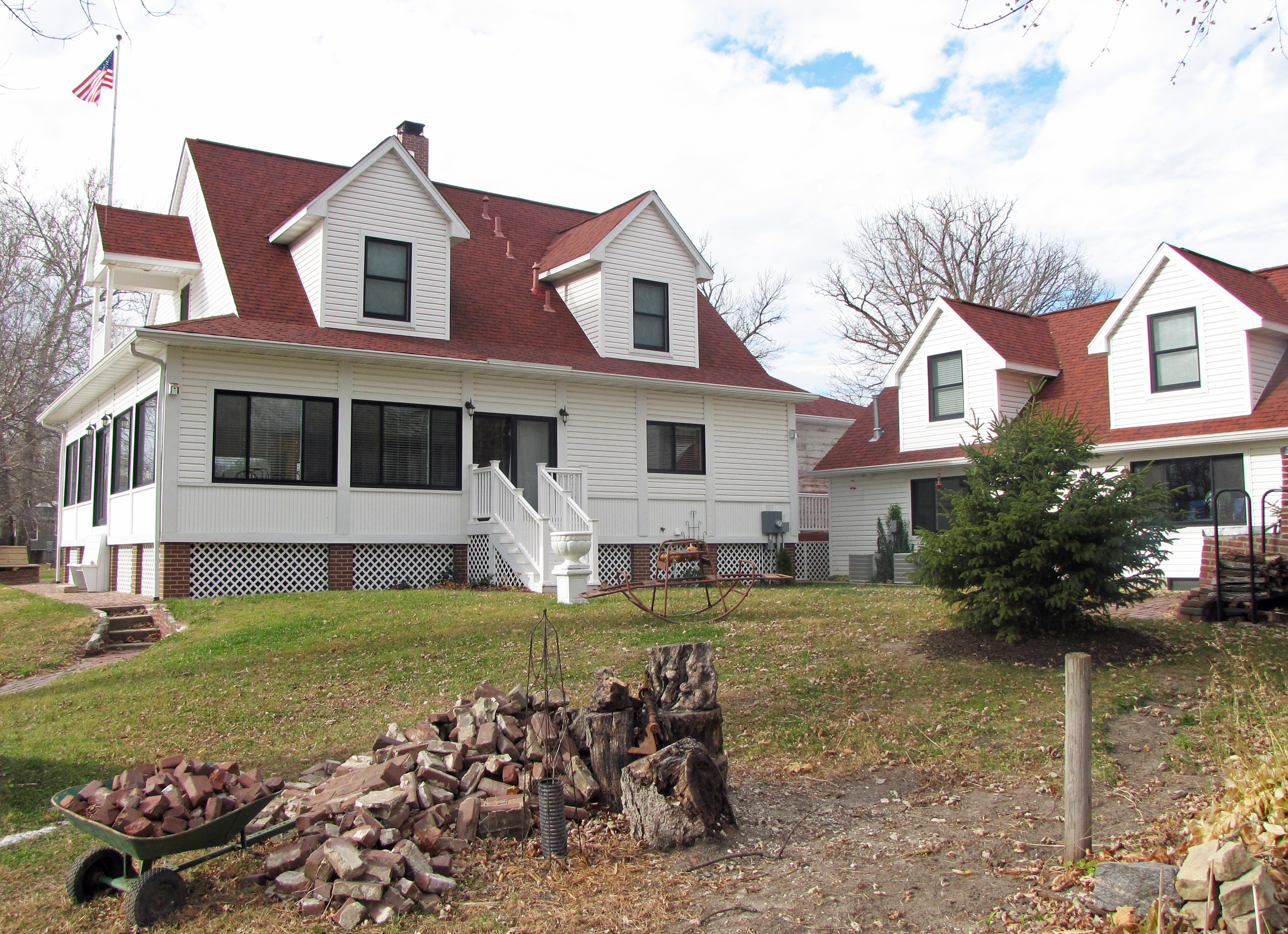
A river view of an Englert relative's year-around "replica" home on the site to Will and Etta Chopek Englert's "summer cottage" on their Brighton Beach along Iowa River across from City Park.

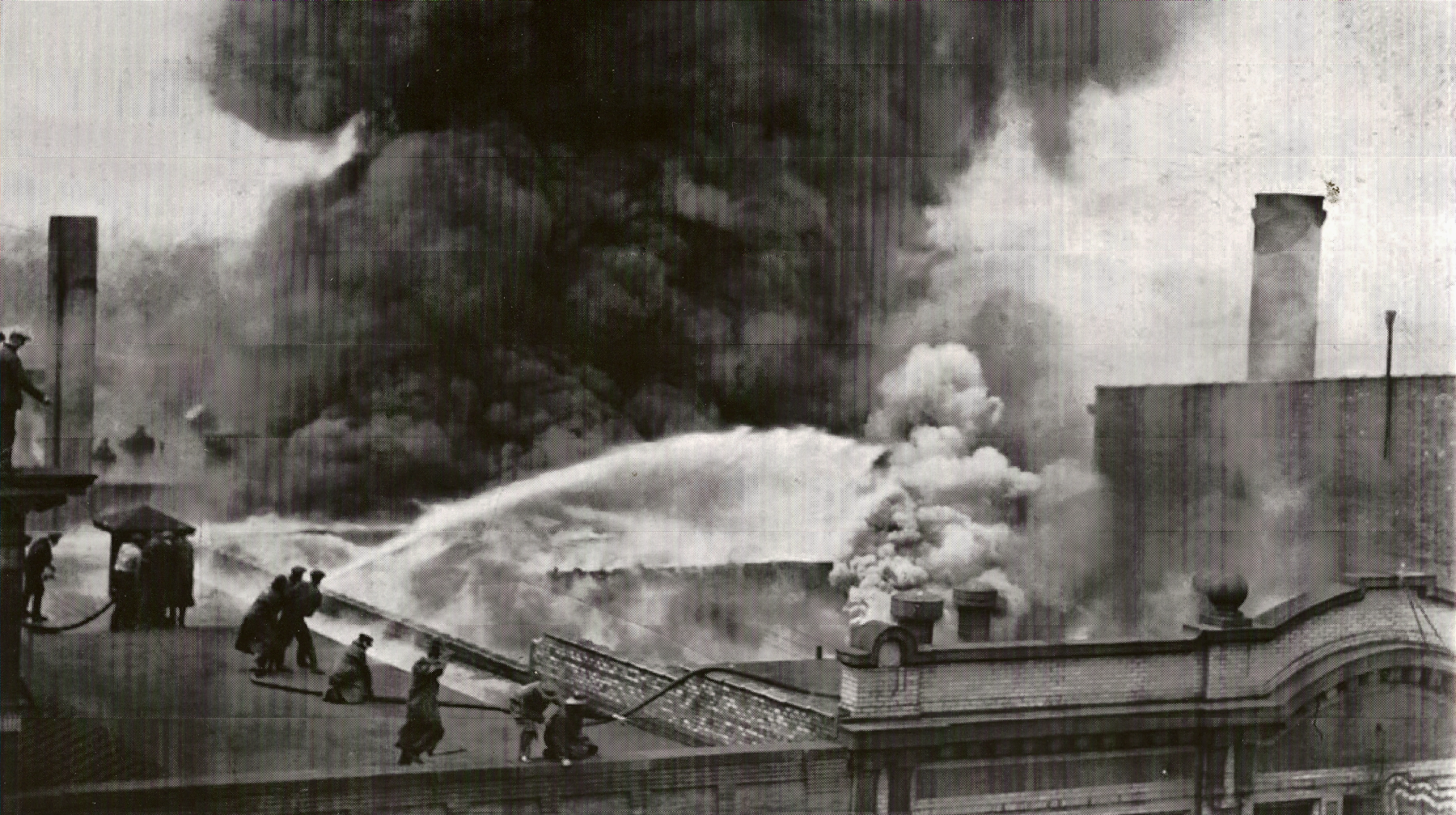
Smoke billows from the roof and back wall of Englert Theatre during 1926 as firemen spray from the roof of the adjoining Parks Transfer building (later Pla-Mor Bowling).

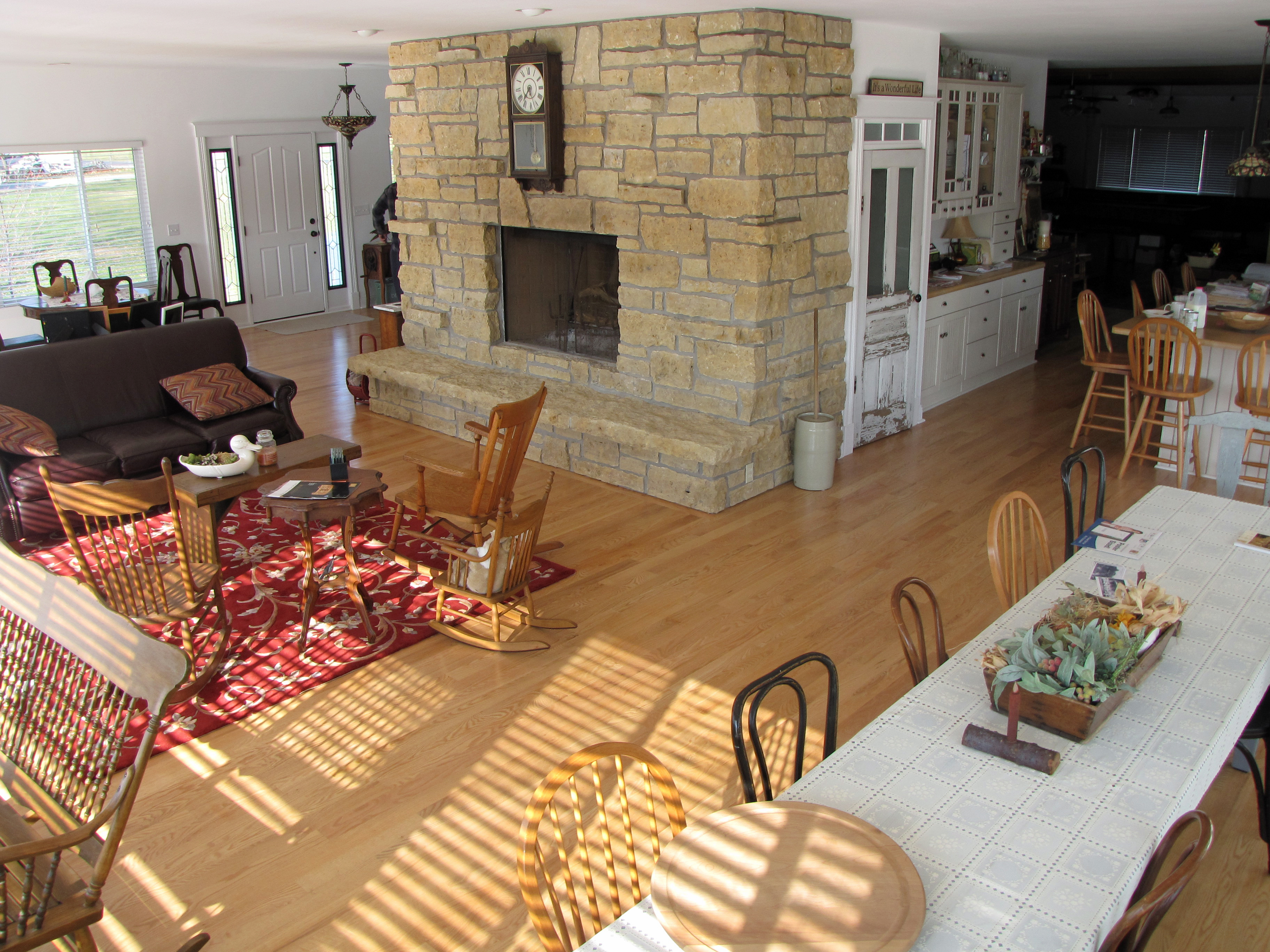
The spacious interior of an Englert relative's private home on the Englert's Brighton Beach site.

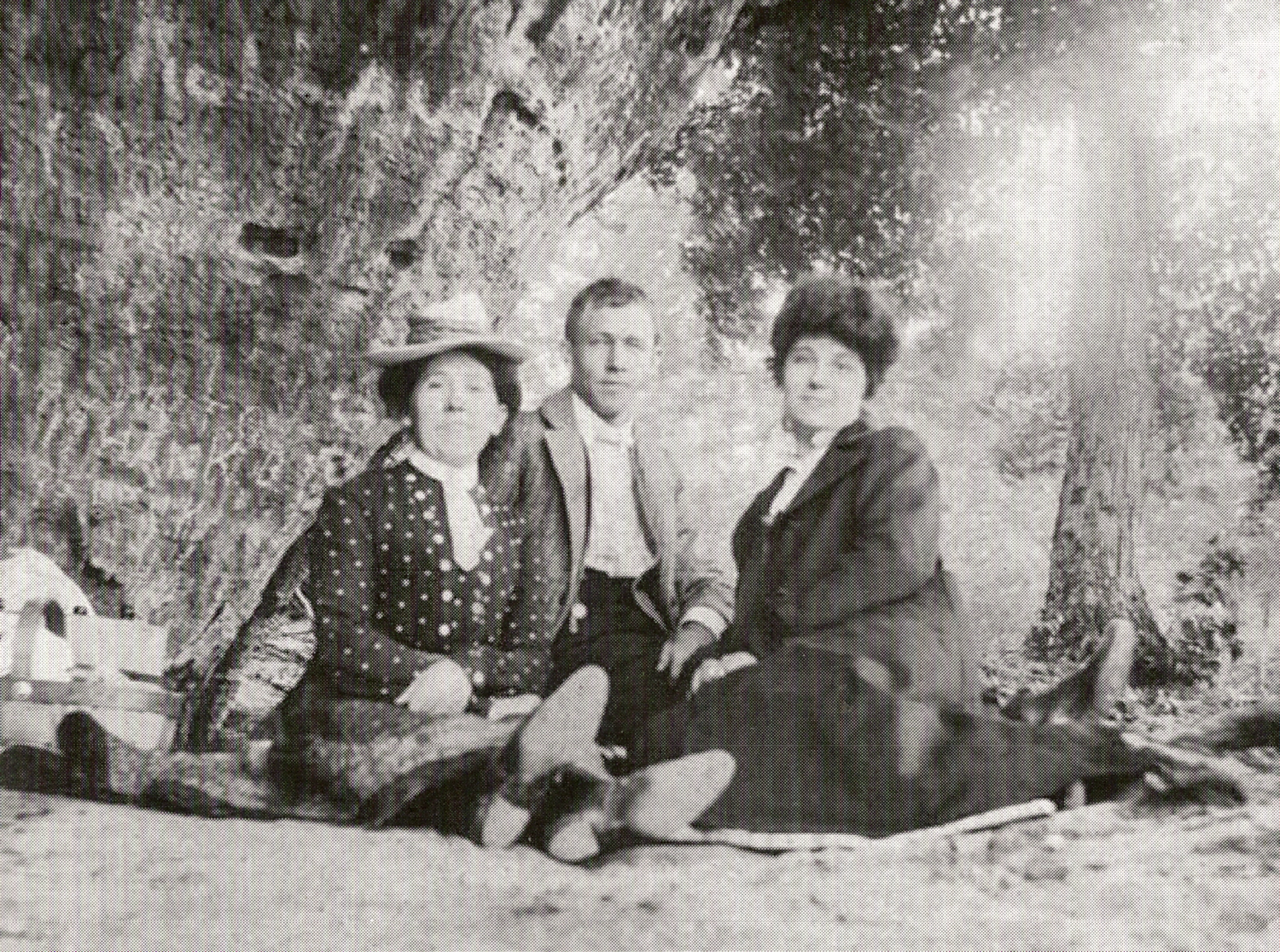
Will and Etta Chopek Englert with her sister Emma Chopek Unrath (left) pose during a picnic under a rock outcrop about 1909. The photo is from the family archive of grandniece Carol Chopek Seydel.

A 1926 fire destroyed the original interior of the Englert, but a determined remarried Englert widow, Etta Chopek Englert Hanlon rebuilt.

The reconstruction cost $125,000, which is equal to $1.6 million in 2012 dollars. Among other design alterations, she eliminated eight box seating areas, each with six seats, hanging from the side walls. They had been considered fire traps even while under construction during 1912.

Will Englert had died in 1920 from "a nervous breakdown and cerebral hemorrhage" (stroke) in a bedroom of his home in the Englert Theatre building. Englert management briefly was the province of William M. McKenzie.

A year after her first husband's death, Etta Englert was remarried at age 38 to barber James J. Hanlon, whose shop was beside the ticket booth at street level of the Englert building, a spot previously occupied by Englert Candy Nook, which was moved into the theater lobby. Englert management by Etta and her new husband followed.

During a portion of the 1930s Great Depression years, Hanlon also managed the local Falstaff beer distributorship. He earlier had owned and operated Iowa City Fruit Co. Etta Chopek Englert Hanlon died at age 69 in 1952, shortly after the death of her second husband. She bore no children from either marriage.

For movie screenings, the Englert succeeded improvised store-front movie houses in Iowa City adapted on flat floors with such names as Dreamland, Nickledom, American, and Bijou. The first, Dreamland, had been opened during 1906 at 111 South Dubuque Street, just south of Jefferson Building, by Fred Racine, who became widely known later for what became his four cigar stores with pool tables and ornate soda fountains. The Bijou name now is used by a student activities board screening old titles in the university's Iowa Memorial Union during the academic year.

The original film showing in Iowa City, however, was not even in a building, but a tent pitched in Dubuque Street to show the 12-minute-long 1903 flick The Great Train Robbery (film). Admission cost a dime, or about $2.50 in 2012 dollars.

The Englert remained a local commercial movie house until 1999, although significantly damaged more than a decade earlier by its division into two auditoriums. The building was offered for sale, and purchased by a widely known local bar owner for possible use as a night club.

A public drive to "Save the Englert" project resulted. As sufficient funding was raised and arranged, reconstruction restored the Englert back its original configuration as a single auditorium and to the condition it operates in today.

== See also ==
- Coldren Opera House, which eventually closed following competition from the Englert Theatre
- Movie palaces list
