= VuFind =

Open-source library search software

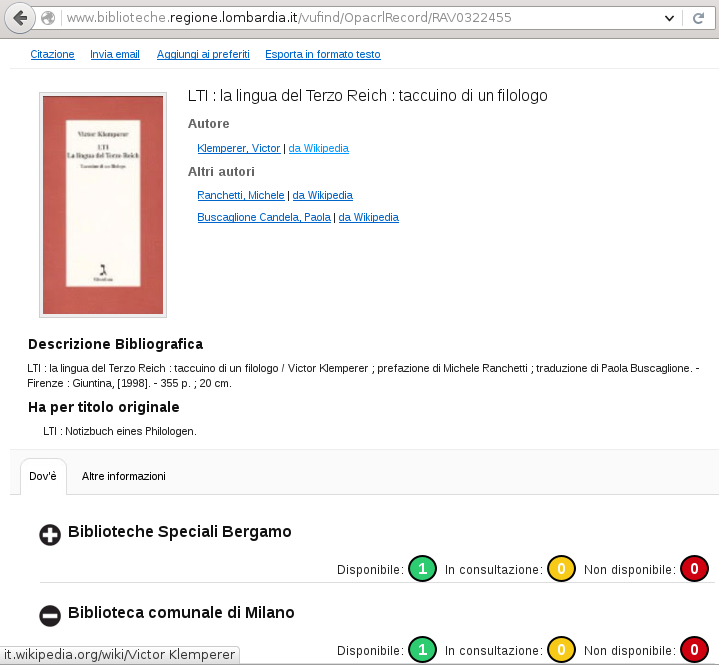
- Developer: Villanova University
- Release: July 15, 2010; 15 years ago
- Stable release: 11.0.4 / 1 June 2026; 37 days ago
- Written in: PHP/Laminas, Java
- Available in: English
- Type: Discovery layer
- License: GPL-2.0-only
- Website: https://vufind.org
- Repository: github.com/vufind-org/vufind

VuFind is an open-source library search engine that allows users to search and browse beyond the resources of a traditional Online public access catalog (OPAC). Developed by Villanova University, version 1.0 was released in July 2010 after two years in beta.

VuFind operates with a simple interface and offers flexible keyword searching. While most commonly used for searching catalog records, VuFind can be extended to search other library resources including: locally cached journals, digital library items, and institutional repository and bibliography. The software is also modular and highly configurable, allowing implementers to choose system components to best fit their needs.

The project wiki lists around two hundred institutions running live or beta instances of VuFind including the National Library of Finland, the National Library of Ireland, and the Iowa City Public Library, as well as a dozen of instances run by finc in Germany.

== Features ==
VuFind offers a number of features that enhance usability:

- Faceted search results that allow users to narrow items by format, call number, language, author, genre, era, region, and more
- Suggested resources and searches
- Browsing capability
- Personal organization and annotation of resources through favorites lists, texting, e-mailing, tagging, and commenting features
- Persistent URLs
- APA or MLA citations
- Author biographies
- Multi-language capability with translations available in Brazilian Portuguese, Chinese, Czech, Dutch, English, French, German, Japanese, Spanish, Bengali (India) and more
