= Margaret Elizabeth Sangster =

American poet (1838–1912)

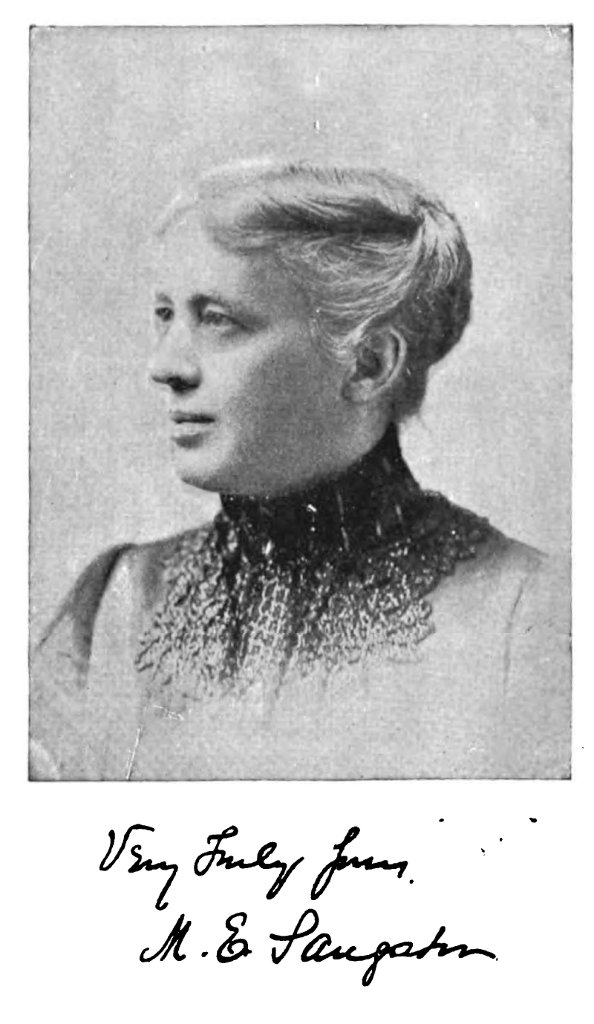
- a "Woman of the Century"
- Born: Margaret Elizabeth Munson; February 22, 1838; New Rochelle, New York, U.S.
- Died: June 3, 1912 (aged 74); South Orange, New Jersey, U.S.
- Occupations: Poet; author; editor
- Spouse: George Sangster (m. 1858; died 1871)
- Writing career
- Pen name: Aunt Marjorie
- Language: English

Margaret Elizabeth Sangster (pen name, Aunt Marjorie; February 22, 1838 – June 3, 1912) was an American poet, author, and editor. Her poetry was inspired by family and church themes, and included hymns and sacred texts. She worked in several fields including book reviewing, story writing, and verse making. For a quarter of a century, Sangster was known by the public as a writer, beginning as a writer of verse, and combining later the practical work of a critic and journalist. Much of her writing did not include her name.

Her literary productions were numerous, and she was a regular contributor to many of the leading periodicals. She gradually drifted into editorial work, and in 1871, she became the editor of Hearth and Home. In 1873, she took an editorial position on the Christian at Work, which she held for six years. In 1879, she joined the staff of the Christian Intelligencer, and served as assistant editor until 1888. In 1882, she added to her work the editing of Harper's Young People, then starting. In 1890, she became the editor of Harper's Bazar. During these busy years, she also wrote poetry. Her miscellaneous work included stories, sketches, essays, editorial comment, criticisms, and other writing implied in the journalistic positions she held. Her published books are Manual of Missions of the Reformed Church in America (New York, 1878); Poems of the Household (Boston, 1883); Home Fairies and Heart Flowers (New York, 1887), and a series of Sunday school books.

== Early years and education ==
Margaret Elizabeth Munson was born February 22, 1838, in New Rochelle, New York,. She was the daughter of John Munson of Ireland and Margaret Chisholm of New York City. Her father was in the marble industry in New York City. Margaret and her younger sister Isabell grew up in a very religious household.

She was educated principally at home, in Paterson, New Jersey, and at Williamsburgh. In childhood she was precocious and gave signs of her literary talents.

== Career ==
Her literary career began in her seventeenth year, when she wrote and published a book—a child's story—called Little Jamie. Before that, however, she had written verses, competed for prizes (and won them) with essays and other writings. For seventeen years she has entirely supported her family by journalistic work. In the beginning of her career, she was connected with Hearth and Home, an attractive but rather short-lived paper.

Sangster held editorial positions with a number of periodicals including, The Christian at Work, Harper's Young People and eventually became an editor at Harper’s Bazaar from 1889 to 1899. At Harper's Young People, she was known among the young readers as "The Little Postmistress." Other than Harper’s Bazaar, she contributed to Ladies' Home Journal, Hearth and Home, and the Christian Intelligencer, The Christian Union (later became The Outlook), The Congregationalist and The Christian Herald. Sangster also wrote a 3-column, full page spread for Woman's Home Companion entitled "Mrs. Sangster's Home Page" which often included a double-paged layout folio of contemporary photographs of women-at-work, internationally, as well as a follow-up page called Mrs. Sangster's "Answers to Correspondents" published in 1907. Through her work, she became acquainted with notable people of her era, including Mark Twain and Helen Keller.

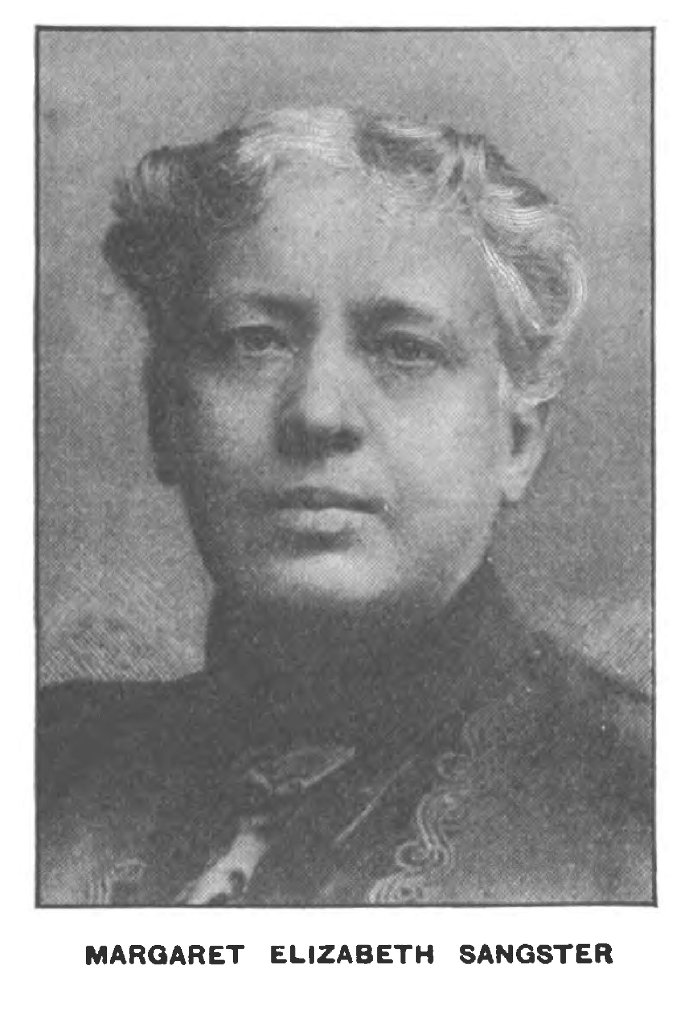
Sangster in 1904

Among Sangster's prose works are several volumes of stories for children, and of these, Little Jamie was written when she was seventeen years old. Hours with Girls and Winsome Womanhood were her most popular works. Her volumes of poetry include, Poems of the Household, Home Fairies and Heart Flowers, On the Road Home and Easter Bells. Sangster grew up a devout member of the Dutch Reformed Church and wrote many hymns and sacred texts. These include a setting of the Te Deum Laudamus and a hymn called, Thine is the Power, which gained a fair degree of popularity in its time. For fifteen years, she contributed largely to religious periodical literature.

Most of her writing as of 1889 was for the newspapers, and without her name. In speaking of her profession as a journalist she once said :—" I love it with all my heart, and would not exchange it with all its drudgery for any other position of which I can dream. Everything about it suits me and charms me. More, perhaps, than anything else, I value the opportunity it gives me to say helpful words, and reach a cordial hand to the struggling of my sex." In 1902, Sangster wrote the introduction to the book, Happenings in Our Home, a book where a family could record the important events in their lives such as births, deaths, weddings, vacations, and holidays. She published her autobiography in 1909.

== Personal life ==
She married George Sangster, of Williamsburgh, New York, in 1858, and accepted the care of a family of children, and was a successful stepmother. She had one child of her own, a son, George Sangster, a journalist, later becoming a grandmother to Margaret E. Sangster, a writer and magazine editor. She made her home in Brooklyn, where she was active in connection with church and Sunday-school work. She essentially gave up writing until after her husband's death in 1871; she never remarried.

Sangster was a member of the Woman's Board of Foreign Missions of the Reformed Church in America, as well as being fond of music and society. She was a conspicuous personage in the literary and social circle of New York, her home being in Brooklyn. Sangster died in South Orange, New Jersey, June 3, 1912. Her nephew, Charles Chisholm Brainerd, was married to the author Eleanor Hoyt Brainerd.

== Style and themes ==
Her verses are full of tender, often religious, sentiments and her stories are bright and well told. The themes of Christian devotion and homely wisdom were often mingled together.

== Selected works ==
- Little Knights and Ladies (1895) Harper & Brothers
- Village Life in America, 1852–1872, including the period of the American Civil War as told in the diary of a school-girl by Caroline Cowles Richards
- An Experience
- Lyrics of Love of Hearth and Home & Field and Garden (1901)
- Eleanor Lee (1903)
- From My Youth Up
- Winsome Womanhood; Familiar Talks on Life and Conduct
- Fairest Girlhood
- The Women of the Bible: A Portrait Gallery
- Cheerful To-days and Trustful To-morrows
- The Little Kingdom of Home
- Radiant Motherhood; A Book for the Twentieth Century Mother
- The Art of Being Agreeable
- Vacation Time
- The Story Bible (1905) Moffat, Yard & Co. of New York
- The Sin of Omission
- The Birthday
- Happy School Days(1909)
