= Andy Haman =

American bodybuilder (1966–2021)

- Born: August 16, 1966; Iowa City, Iowa, U.S.
- Died: March 19, 2021 (aged 54); Colorado Springs, Colorado, U.S.
- Education: University of Iowa
- Years active: 1987, 2004–2010
- Known for: IFBB professional bodybuilder, USA national freestyle wrestling champion, and "Mr. Incredible" impression
- Television: Actor/Producer: Duque in "The Jurassic Dead"
- Title: Midwest Natural Championships in 1987, Colorado Superheavyweight Mr. Colorado 2007
- Spouse: Michelle (m. 1992)
- Children: 4

Anthony Joseph "Andy" Haman (August 16, 1966 – March 19, 2021) was an American professional bodybuilder who competed in the superheavyweight class.

== Biography ==
Born in Iowa City, Iowa, Haman was a member of the University of Iowa wrestling team. Before he was a bodybuilder, Haman was a standout high school wrestler in the state of Iowa where he compiled 210 victories and a state championship. He went on to wrestle at the University of Iowa under collegiate and Olympic wrestler Dan Gable. While there, he was a National freestyle champion, Olympic sport Festival Champion and World runner-up in wrestling as a Varsity team member of 4 National Championship Wrestling Teams. He graduated from the University of Iowa with a Bachelor of Science in Education with a minor in Health and Art. He taught in the public school system for 14 years, coaching wrestling and football teams to both team and individual state championships. He competed in bodybuilding tournaments, winning the 1987 Midwest Natural Championships, but gave up the sport to focus on teaching. He relocated to Colorado Springs, Colorado, where he taught physical education and health at Thomas B. Doherty High School. In 2004, Haman retired from teaching to concentrate on establishing a career in bodybuilding.

In 2006, Haman won the National Physique Committee (NPC) Colorado State Championship in the superheavyweight class. Later that year, he placed 16th in both the NPC USA Bodybuilding Championships and the NPC National Bodybuilding Championships. In 2007, Haman placed second in the Shawn Ray Colorado NPC Classic, then won the superheavyweight class and the overall title at the NPC Masters Bodybuilding National Championships, where he earned his International Federation of BodyBuilding & Fitness bodybuilding pro card.

== Career overview ==
- Iowa City High School, Iowa City, Iowa (1990–1991) Physical Education Teacher and Coach

- Fitness Director at YMCA, Lexington, Kentucky (1992–1994) Director of youth and adult sports programs Manager of fitness and wellness department

- Physical Education Teacher Thomas B. Doherty High School Colorado Springs, Colorado (1994–2005) Heath and PE teacher Head Wrestling Coach Assistant Football Coach

- Professional Athlete at Dymatize (2007–2015) Spokesman and Representative

- Professional Athlete at R-Labz Colorado Springs, Colorado (2015–2017) Spokesman and Brand Representative

- Owner and Founder at Incredible Way Nutrition Tampa, Florida (2018–2021)

== Death ==
Haman died on March 19, 2021; his wife Michelle said the death was due to a pulmonary embolism from an elbow joint surgery three days prior.
