= Hamburg Inn No. 2 =

Diner in Iowa City, Iowa, United States

Coordinates: 41.6641°N 91.5314°W

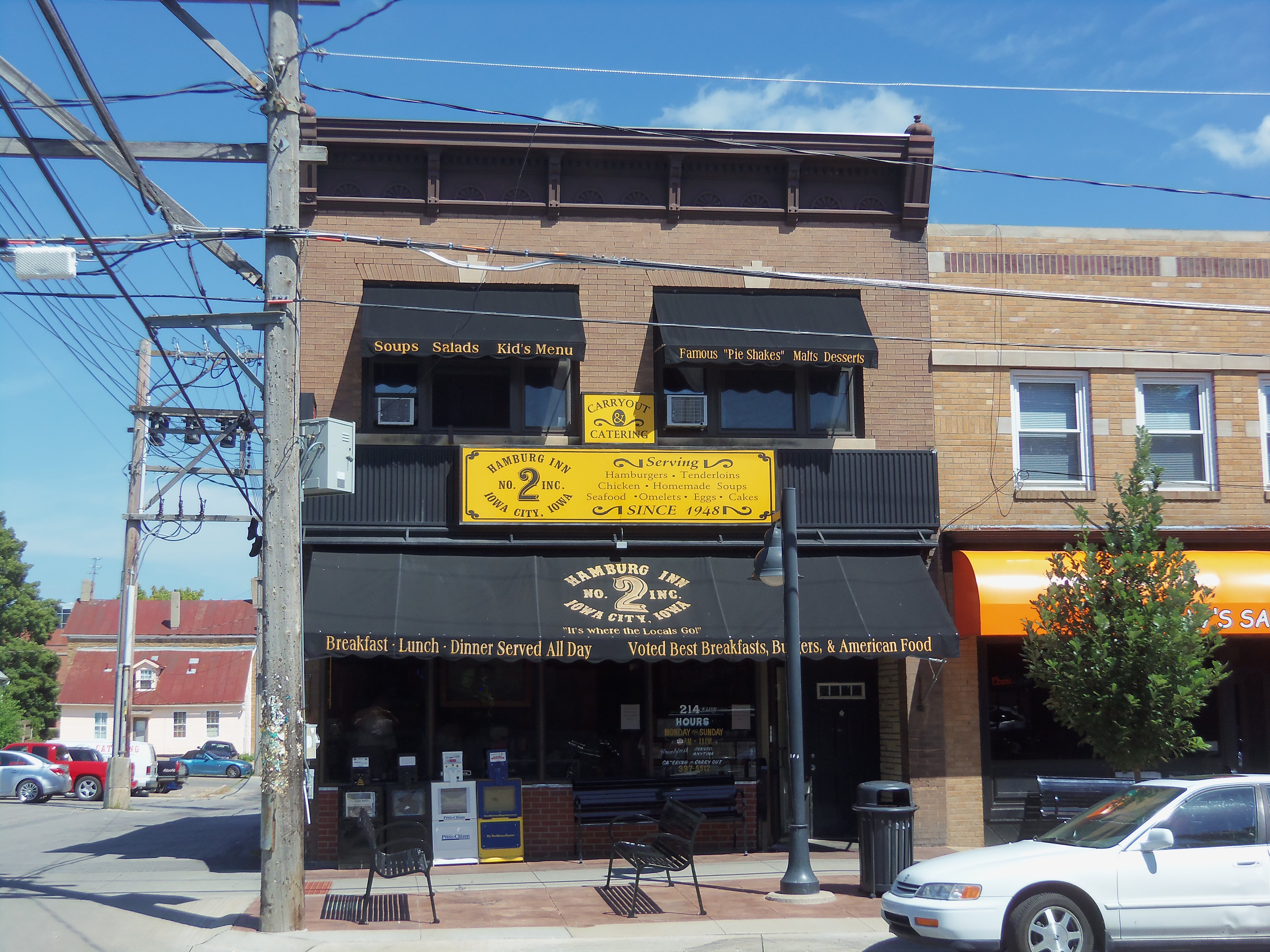
Hamburg Inn No. 2

The Hamburg Inn No. 2 is a small family diner located near downtown in Iowa City, Iowa, in the United States. The Hamburg Inn is a regular stop for presidential candidates during the Iowa Caucuses. Ronald Reagan, Bill Clinton, and Barack Obama have visited, and the restaurant was featured on the TV show, The West Wing.

== History ==
Joe Panther started the Hamburg Inn on Iowa Avenue in the mid-1930s. Later, Joe's brother Adrian joined the business, and eventually bought the restaurant from Joe. In 1948, Mrs. Van's Restaurant at 214 North Linn Street came up for sale and was bought by another brother, Fritz, and his wife, Fran, which would become known as the Hamburg Inn No. 2. Adrian and Fritz formed a partnership and over the years developed several restaurants, the Hamburg Inns No. 1 and No. 2, the Big Ten Inn on Riverside Drive and the Airport Inn in Iowa City. They also had the Hamburg Inn No. 3 in Cedar Rapids on Center Point Road. As of 2011 Hamburg Inn No. 2 is the only location remaining of the three. Dave Panther, Fritz and Fran's son, bought the restaurant in 1979 from his parents and continued the tradition. In 2016 the diner was purchased by Michael Lee, who announced plans to expand the diner into a chain, with locations across the Midwest and in China.

== Food and drink ==
The "Burg" has also been widely acclaimed as one of the best "greasy spoons" in Iowa. It serves breakfast all day long, and serves a wide variety of omelettes sided by homefries.

One of the more famous Hamburg Inn concoctions is the "pie shake", a milkshake made by blending soft serve ice cream, milk, and a slice of pie.

== Iowa Caucuses ==
During the Iowa Caucuses, candidates seeking the presidential nomination of their party frequently meet caucus-goers at the Hamburg Inn. The restaurant conducts a coffee-bean caucus, in which each guest is given a coffee bean to place in the jar of his/her candidate. Howard Dean won in 2004, with Dennis Kucinich and John Kerry coming in second and third, respectively. In 2008, Barack Obama won the Democratic contest with John Edwards and Hillary Clinton coming in second and third. Mike Huckabee won for the Republicans. Each year many political candidates visit the Hamburg Inn to increase the publicity to Iowa. John Edwards visited there in the 2008 election. Former governor Mike Huckabee and governor Chris Christie visited during the 2016 election cycle.

== Appearances ==
Major political appearances include:

- President Ronald Reagan
- President Bill Clinton
- General Wesley Clark
- Congressman Dennis Kucinich
- Governor Howard Dean
- Pat Buchanan
- Then-Senator Barack Obama
- Senator Elizabeth Warren

Major surrogate appearances:

- Elizabeth Edwards for her husband John Edwards
- Rob Reiner for Howard Dean
- Martin Sheen for Howard Dean
- Patch Adams for Dennis Kucinich
