= Finc =

Open consortium serving academic libraries in Germany

finc (find in catalog) is an open consortium comprising various university libraries that jointly operate and develop bibliographic search engines (cf. discovery systems) for their users. The consortium focuses on free and open source software as well as being independent of lesser transparent solution, such as commercial bibliographic indexes. Thus, apart from extending the open source software VuFind major efforts embrace negotiating with publishers to acquire metadata records (e.g. as MARC or JATS or any proprietary format) to already licensed content, as well as processing such records to adhere to the Solr index schema in place.

Initiated 2011 with public funds for Saxony, Germany, as a three-year project, its scope used to be restricted to Saxon university libraries. The consortium since finances their infrastructure and further development via own shared means of over a dozen institutions across Germany. Coordination and hosting is undertaken in and by University Library of Leipzig.
