= Eleanor Hoyt Brainerd =

American writer

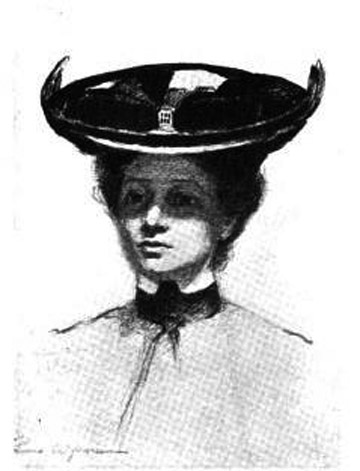
- Eleanor Hoyt Brainerd, ca. 1902
- Born: January 31, 1868; Iowa City, Iowa
- Died: March 18, 1942 (aged 74); Pasadena, California
- Education: Cincinnati Wesleyan College
- Occupations: Novelist; author; reporter; editor
- Spouse: Charles Chisholm Brainerd
- Relatives: Margaret Elizabeth Sangster (by marriage)
- Writing career
- Pen name: Eleanor Hoyt; Eleanor Hoyt Brainerd
- Period: 1902–1919
- Genres: Youth literature, novels, memoirs

Eleanor Hoyt Brainerd (1868 – 1942) was an early 20th-century American writer. She published at least 10 novels, mostly written for young women.

== Childhood ==
Eleanor was born on January 31, 1868 at Plum Grove Historic House in Iowa City, Iowa, the historic home of Robert Lucas. Her parents, Walter Hoyt and Louisa Smith, were active in the abolitionist movement. Walter's family helped found Eleutherian College. Eleanor's 1919 novel, Our Little Old Lady, is a biography of her parents.

== Career ==
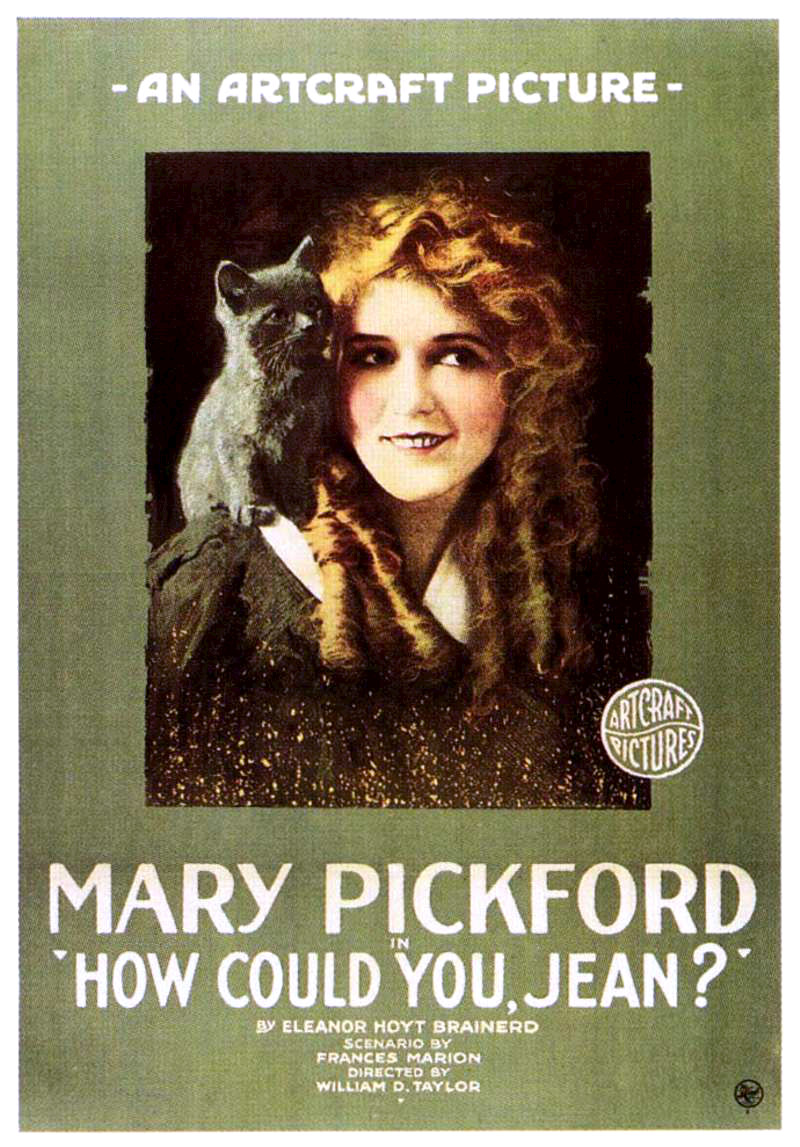
Poster from How Could You Jean?, 1918

Eleanor began her professional career in New York City as a writer and editor for the New York Sun, specializing in fashion writing. Her novel In Vanity Fair drew heavily from her coverage of fashion in Paris and New York. She published extensively in magazines, including Collier's, The Girl's Own Paper, Ladies' Home Journal, The Saturday Evening Post, and Everybody's Magazine, typically in serial format. Her fictional novels often follow the same formula as the Pollyanna or Rebecca of Sunnybrook Farm series, in which a young girl, often an orphan, tries to improve the lives of adults through pluck and daring.

Three of Eleanor's novels were made into silent films, Pegeen (1920), How Could You, Jean? (1918), and For Love of Mary Ellen (1915). How Could You, Jean?, the most famous of the films, was directed by William Desmond Taylor and starred Mary Pickford.

== Personal life ==
Many of Eleanor's novels were written in East Hampton, Connecticut, at her “Faraway Farm” retreat. In 1904 she married attorney Charles Chisholm Brainerd, the nephew of the well-known writer Margaret Elizabeth Sangster. Charles and Eleanor retired to Pasadena, California and are buried in Oakland Cemetery, Iowa City.

She died on March 18, 1942.

== Published novels ==
- 1902 – The Misdemeanors of Nancy. Doubleday, New York. Republished in 1903 and 1904 (as Eleanor Hoyt).
- 1904 – Nancy's Country Christmas, and Other Stories. illustr. Anna Whelan Betts, Doubleday, New York.
- 1905 – Concerning Belinda. Doubleday, New York. Reprinted 1969, Books for Library Press, Freeport, New York.
- 1906 – In Vanity Fair: A Tale of Frocks and Femininity. Moffat, Yard and Co., New York.
- 1907 – Bettina. Doubleday, New York.
- 1910 – The Personal Conduct of Belinda. Doubleday, New York.
- 1912 – For Love of Mary Ellen: A Romance of Childhood. Harper, New York.
- 1915 – Pegeen. Century, New York.
- 1917 – How Could You, Jean? Doubleday, Garden City, New York.
- 1919 – Our Little Old Lady. Doubleday, Garden City, New York.
