= Iowa City, Iowa =

- City
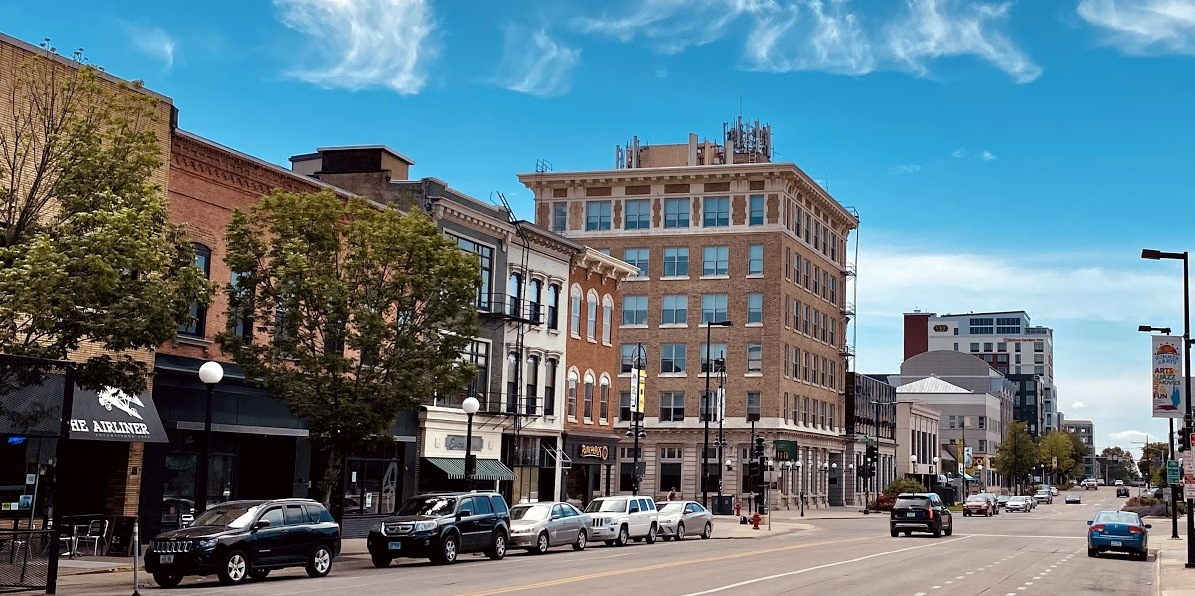
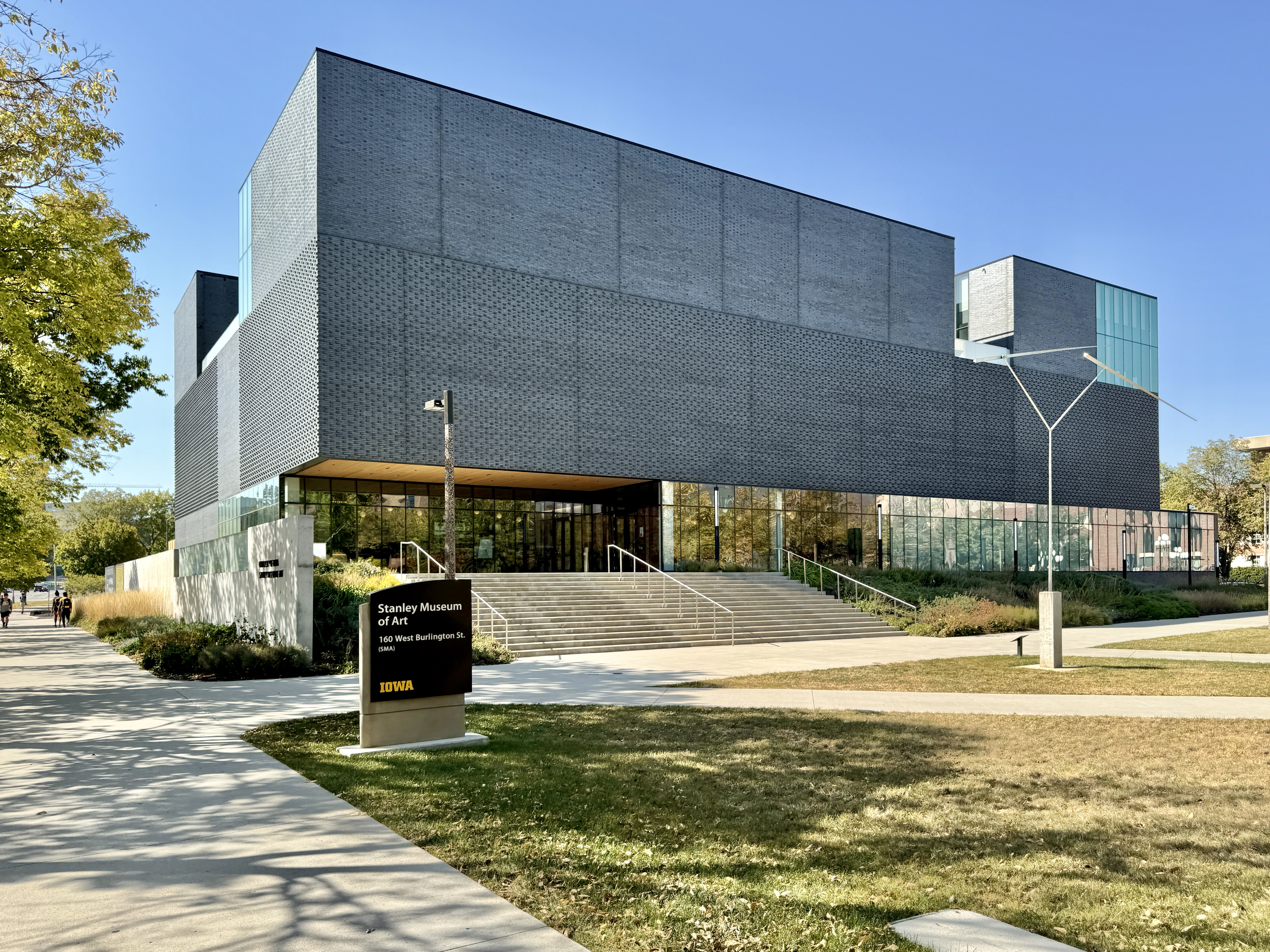
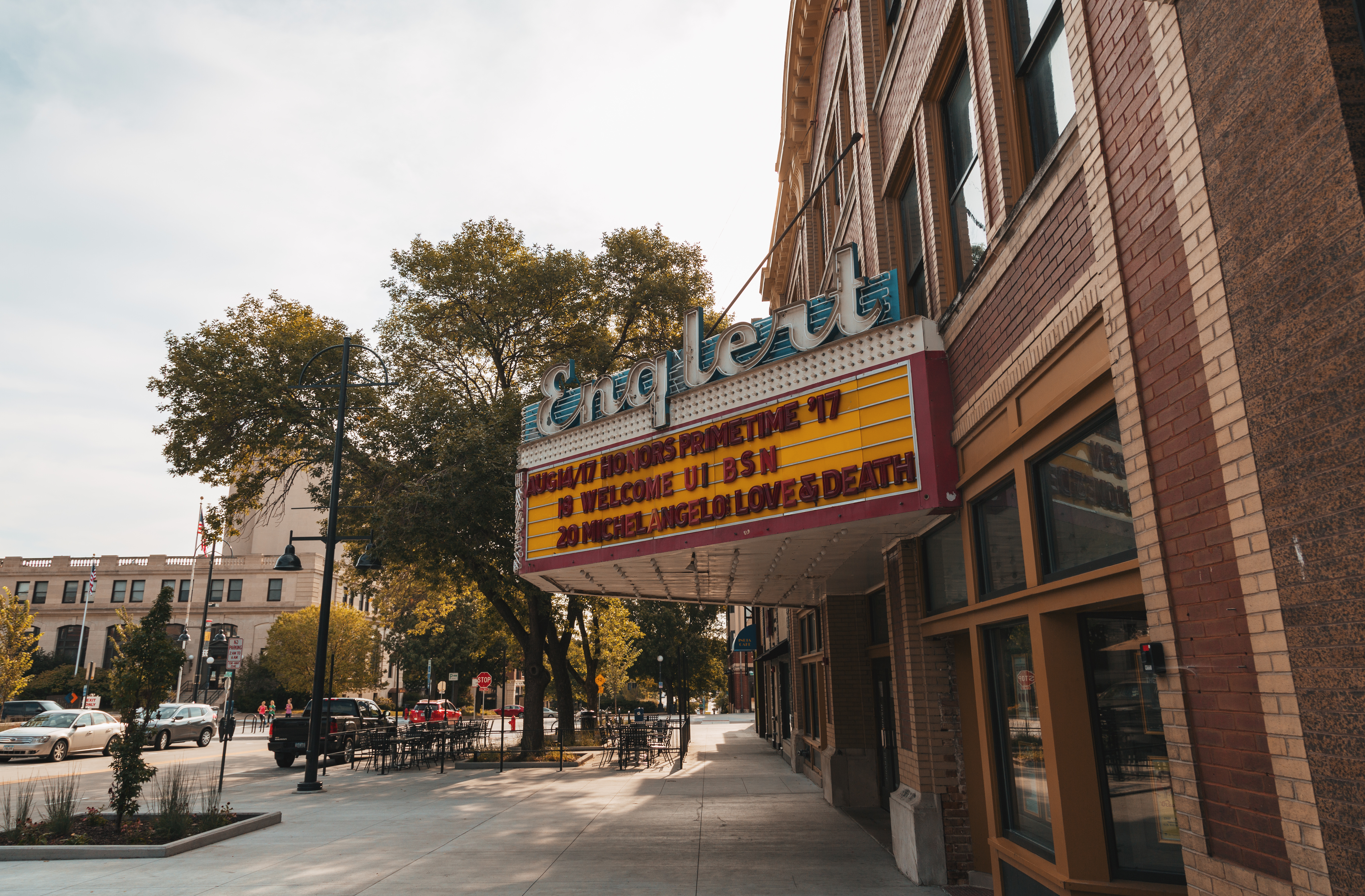
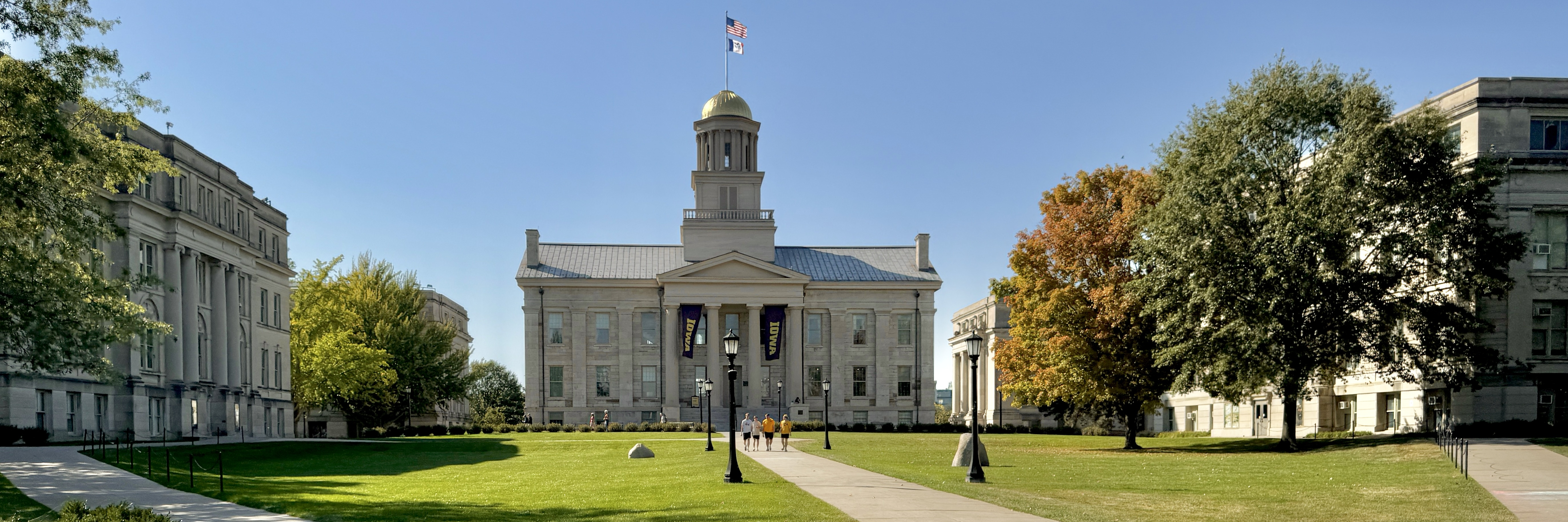
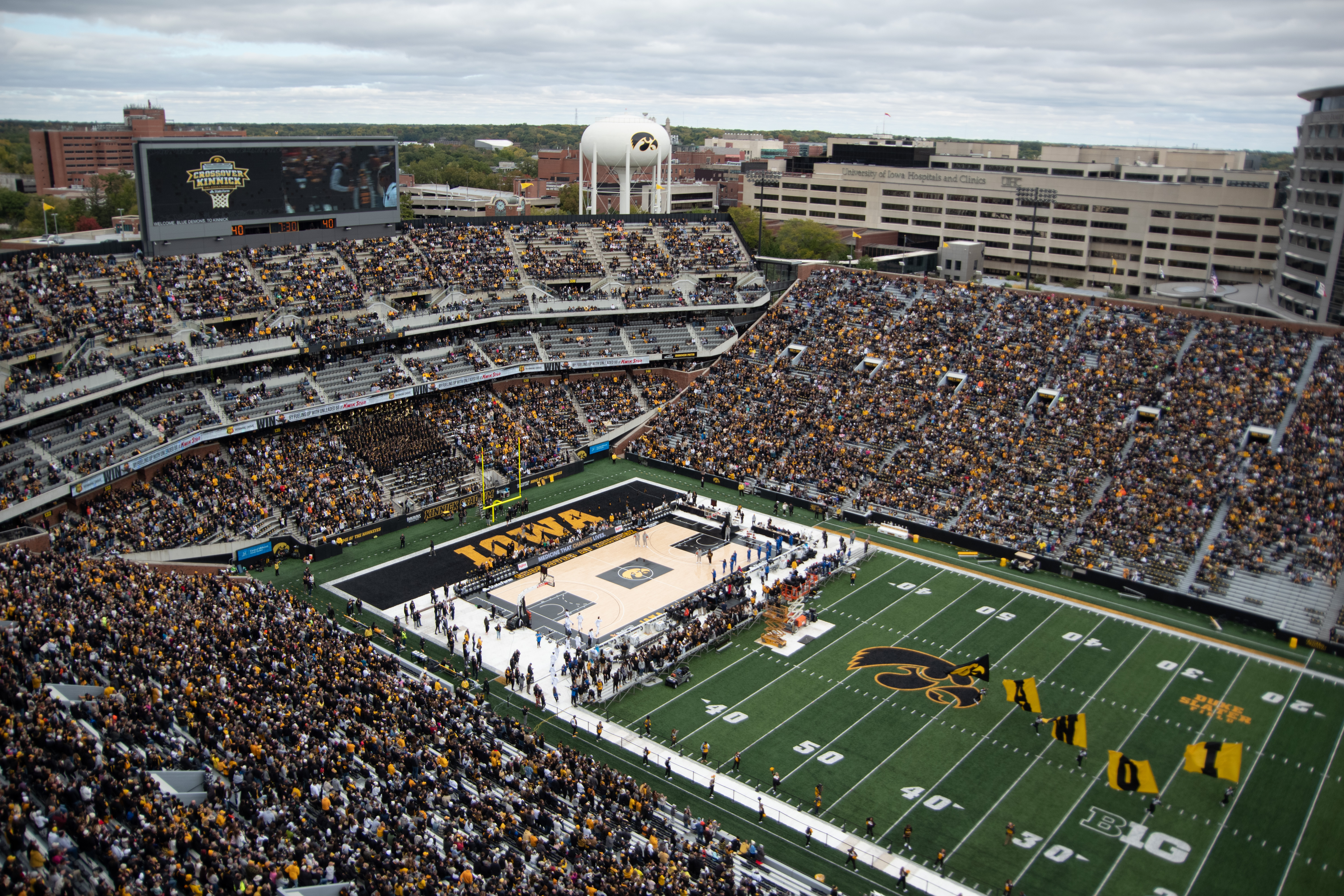
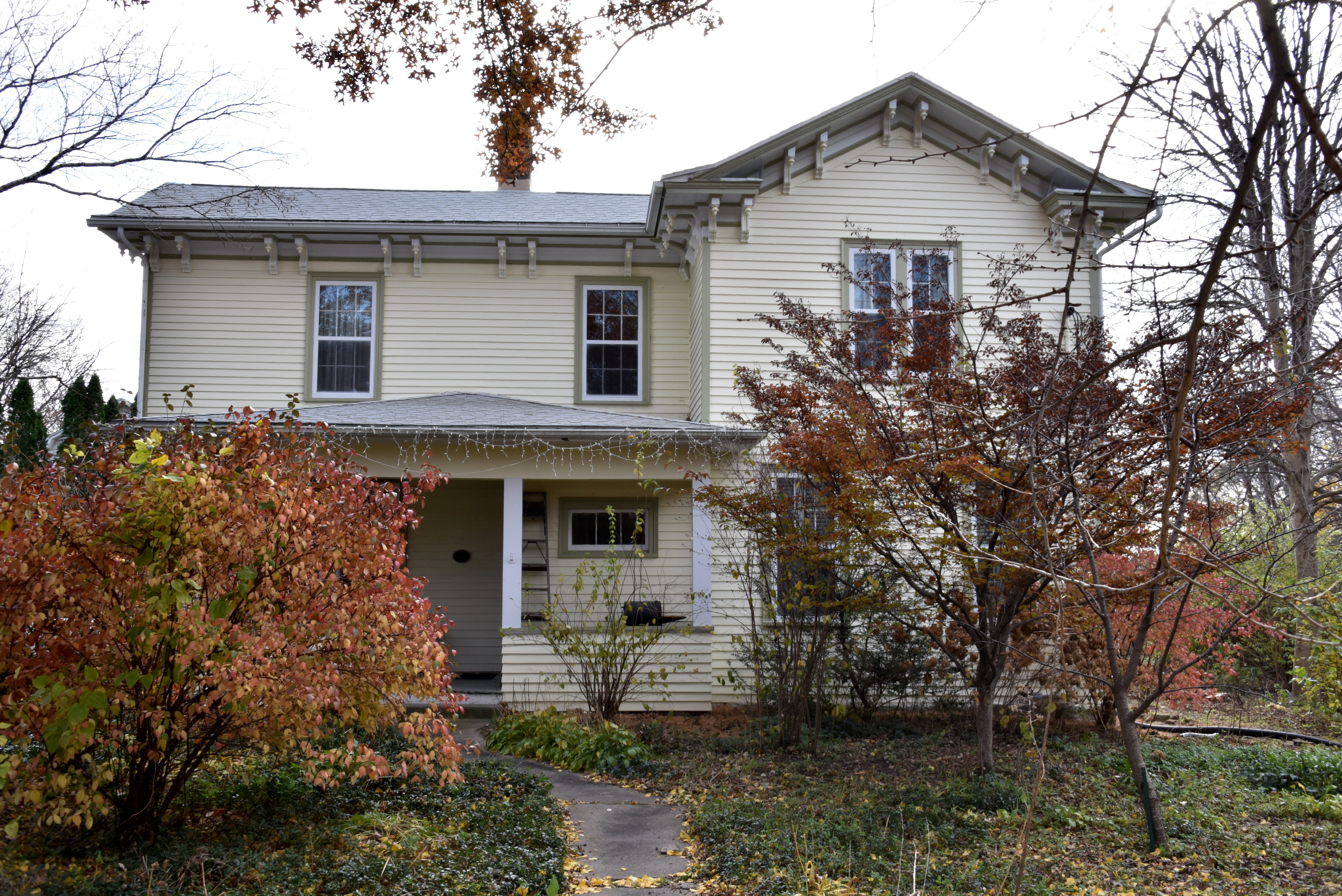
- Downtown Iowa City Stanley Museum of Art Englert Theatre University of Iowa and the Pentacrest Kinnick Stadium Kirkwood House

- Logo
- Nickname: Athens of Iowa
- Interactive map of Iowa City, Iowa
- Location within Iowa Location within the United States
- Coordinates: 41°37′15″N 91°29′41″W
- Country: United States
- State: Iowa
- County: Johnson
- Incorporated: January 24, 1853

Government
  - Type: Council–manager
  - Mayor: Bruce Teague (D)

Area
  - City: 26.19 sq mi (67.82 km^{2})
  - Land: 25.65 sq mi (66.43 km^{2})
  - Water: 0.54 sq mi (1.40 km^{2})
- Elevation: 656 ft (200 m)

Population (2020)
  - City: 74,828
  - Estimate (2025): 76,229
  - Rank: 5th in Iowa
  - Density: 2,917.5/sq mi (1,126.47/km^{2})
  - Metro: 171,491
  - Demonym: Iowa Citian
- Time zone: UTC−6 (CST)
  - Summer (DST): UTC−5 (CDT)
- ZIP codes: 52240, 52242 – 52246
- Area code: 319
- FIPS code: 19-38595
- GNIS feature ID: 468086
- Website: Icgov.org

Iowa City is the largest city in Johnson County, Iowa, United States, and its county seat. The population was 74,828 at the 2020 census, making it the state's fifth-most populous city. The Iowa City metropolitan area, which encompasses Johnson and Washington counties, has a population of over 171,000. The metro area is also a part of a combined statistical area with the Cedar Rapids metro area known as the Iowa City–Cedar Rapids region; collectively, this region has a population of nearly 500,000.

Home of the University of Iowa, the city served as the third and final capital of the Iowa Territory (1841–1846) and the first capital of the state of Iowa (1846–1857). The Old Capitol building, where the state legislature met, is now a National Historic Landmark and museum on the University of Iowa campus. The University of Iowa Art Museum and Plum Grove Historic House, the home of the first governor of Iowa, are also tourist attractions.

== History ==
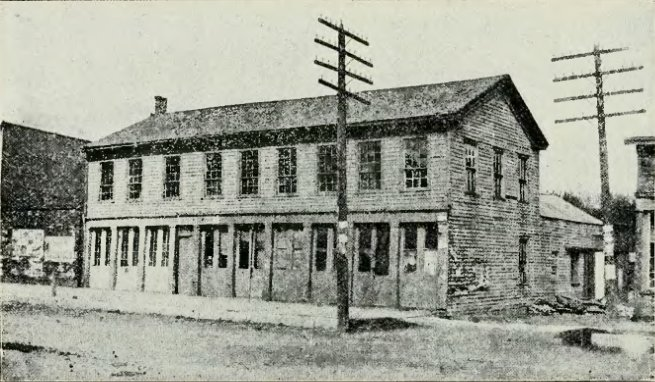
Building in which the Iowa Territorial Legislature first met in Iowa City. Image recorded after the building, which was called Butler's Capitol, had been moved from its original location near Clinton and Washington streets to an alley-side location along Dubuque Street a half-block south of College Street. In this second location, as shown, it became the notorious City Hotel.

Iowa City was created by an act of the Legislative Assembly of the Iowa Territory on January 21, 1839, fulfilling the desire of Governor Robert Lucas to move the capital out of Burlington and closer to the center of the territory. This act began:

An Act to locate the Seat of Government of the Territory of Iowa ... so soon as the place shall be selected, and the consent of the United States obtained, the commissioners shall proceed to lay out a town to be called "Iowa City".

Commissioners Chauncey Swan and John Ronalds met on May 1 in the small settlement of Napoleon, south of present-day Iowa City, to select a site for the new capital city. The following day, the commissioners selected a site on bluffs above the Iowa River north of Napoleon, placed a stake in the center of the proposed site and began planning the new capital city. Commissioner Swan, in a report to the legislature in Burlington, described the site:

Iowa City is located on a section of land lying in the form of an amphitheater. There is an eminence on the west near the river, running parallel with it.

By June of that year, the town had been platted and surveyed from Brown St. in the north to Burlington St. in the south, and from the Iowa River eastward to Governor St.

Iowa City was selected and surveyed as the territorial capital site in 1839. Construction of the Old Capitol Building commenced that year, but the city did not officially serve as the territorial capital until 1841, when the building neared completion. The territorial legislature convened in the Old Capitol Building from 1842 until territorial government ceased on December 28, 1846, when Iowa achieved statehood. In 1857 the state capital was moved to Des Moines.

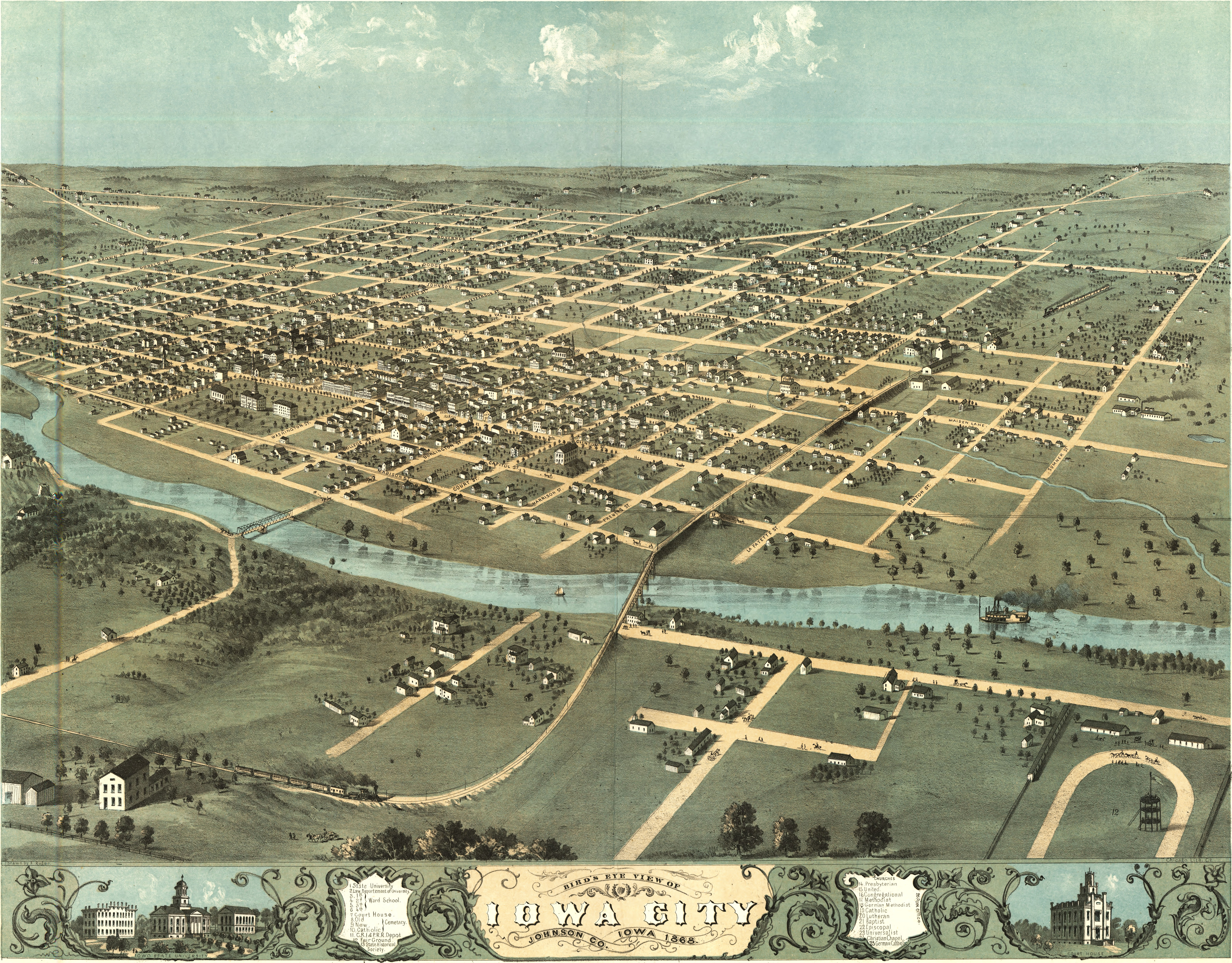
A bird's-eye-view map of Iowa City c. 1868

John F. Rague is credited with designing the Iowa Old Capitol Building. He had previously designed the 1837 capitol of Illinois and was supervising its construction when he got the commission to design the new Iowa capitol in 1839. He quit the Iowa project after five months, claiming his design was not followed, but the resemblance to the Illinois capitol suggests he strongly influenced the final Iowa design. One surviving 1839 sketch of the proposed capital shows a radically different layout, with two domes and a central tower. The cornerstone of the Old Capitol Building was laid in Iowa City on July 4, 1840. Iowa City served as the third and last territorial capital of Iowa, and the last four territorial legislatures met at the Old Capitol Building until December 28, 1846, when Iowa was admitted into the United States as the 29th state of the union. Iowa City was declared the state capital of Iowa, and the government convened in the Old Capitol Building.

Oakland Cemetery was deeded to "the people of Iowa City" by the Iowa territorial legislature on February 13, 1843. The original plot was one block square, with the southwest corner at Governor and Church. Over the years, the cemetery has been expanded and now encompasses 40 acres (16 hectares). Oakland Cemetery is a non-perpetual care city cemetery. This cemetery is supported by city taxes. The staff is strongly committed to the maintenance and preservation of privately owned lots and accessories.

The cemetery is the final resting place of many men and women important in the history of Iowa, of Iowa City and the University of Iowa. These include Robert E. Lucas, first governor of the territory (1838–41); Samuel J. Kirkwood, governor during the Civil War (1860–64), again in 1876, a U.S. senator in 1877, and subsequently secretary of the interior and U.S. minister to Spain; well-known presidents of the university, Walter A. Jessup (1915–33) and Virgil M. Hancher (1940–64); Cordelia Swan, daughter of one of the three commissioners who selected the site for Iowa City and the new territorial capitol; and Irving B. Weber (1900–1997), noted Iowa City historian.

The cemetery contains the 'Black Angel,' an 8.5-foot (2.6 m) bronze monument erected in 1912 for the Feldevert family. The 8.5-foot bronze monument erected in 1912 for the Feldevert family darkened significantly over time due to copper oxidation, a transformation that has generated local urban legends.

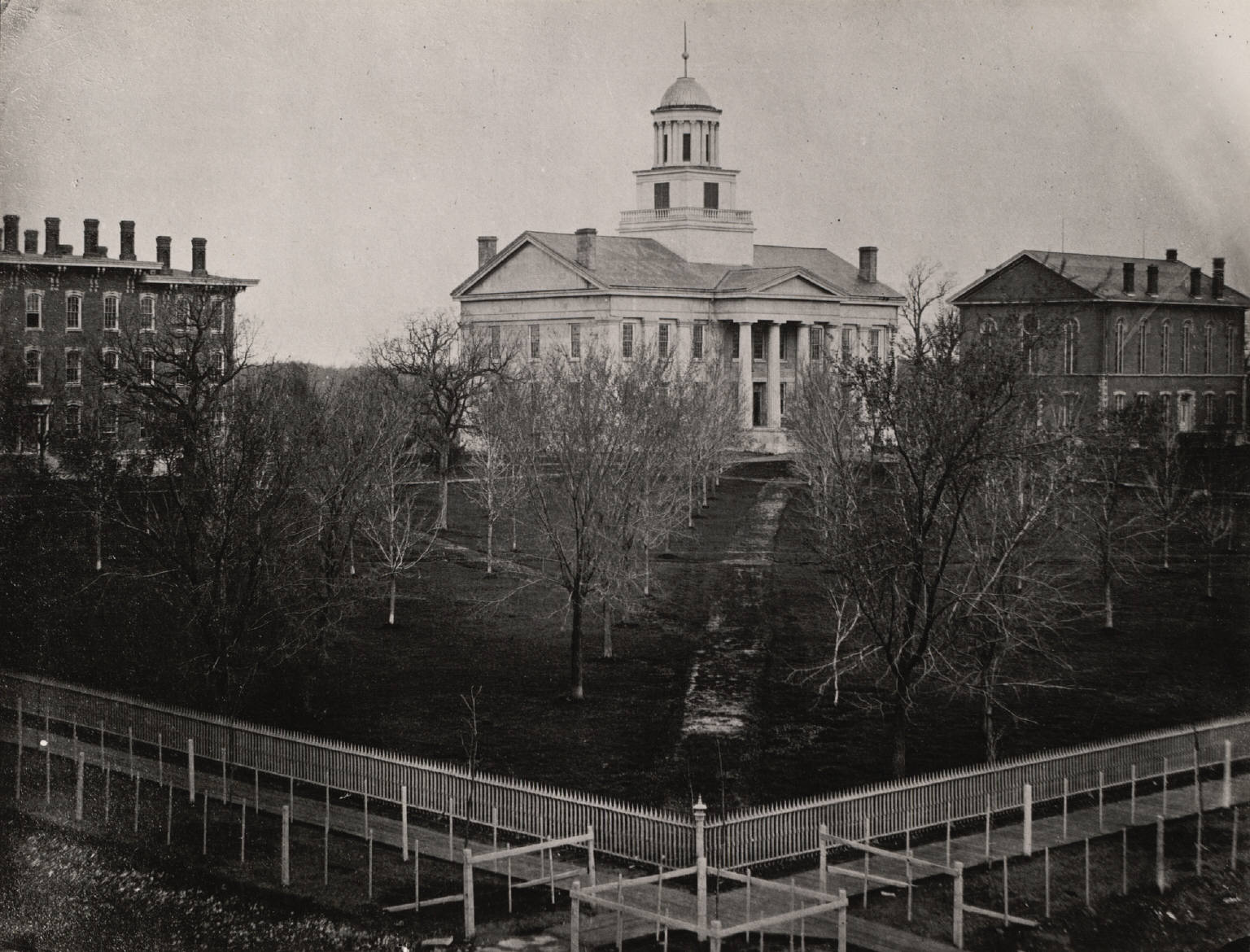
The Iowa Old Capitol Building c. 1924

=== 1970 riots ===
Following the Kent State shootings on May 4, 1970, anti-war protests escalated nationally and in Iowa City. On April 30, President Richard Nixon announced that U.S. forces would invade Cambodia because of the recent communist coup. Students around the country protested this escalation of the Vietnam War. On May 4, the National Guard fired on students at Kent State University, killing four and wounding nine people, which ignited protests all over the country. Anti-war protests were not new to Iowa City or to elsewhere in Iowa; protests had been occurring throughout the 1960s. Spring of 1970 was different.

After the Kent State shootings, students marched on the National Guard Armory, broke windows there as well as in some downtown businesses. The City Council gave the mayor curfew powers. On May 6, students boycotted classes. That evening, approximately 400 demonstrators held a sit-in on the Pentacrest. Later that night, about 50 individuals entered the Old Capitol, discharged a smoke bomb, and voluntarily exited upon request. In the early morning of May 9, President Boyd ordered highway patrolmen to arrest students gathered on the Pentacrest, but the next day he regretted the mass arrests and said he had received faulty information. On May 8, President Boyd cancelled the 89th annual Governor's Day ROTC observance for the following day. On Friday and Saturday, a National Guard helicopter circled the Pentacrest.

In the early morning hours of Saturday, May 9, the Old Armory Temporary (O.A.T.), also known as "Big Pink", which housed the writing lab, was burned down. This building was located next to the Old Armory, where the Adler Journalism and Mass Communications building is currently located. Contemporary accounts indicate that O.A.T. was a priority target for protest actions due to its deteriorated structural condition and documented fire hazard status.

The June–July 1970 issue of the Iowa Alumni Review documented the fire, reporting that structural damage was extensive, with only the building's end walls remaining intact. By Sunday morning, President Boyd gave students the option to leave. Classes were not cancelled, but students could leave and take the grade they currently had. An account of the May 1970 protests can be read in the June–July issue of the Iowa Alumni Review.

In his autobiography, My Iowa Journey: The Life Story of the University of Iowa's First African American Professor, Philip Hubbard (University Vice-Provost in 1970) gives an administrator's perspective of all the protests of the 1960s. He supported the students' right to protest and in 1966 stated: "Students should not accept everything that is dished out to them. We don't want to dictate what they should or should not do. However, student demonstrations should remain within the law and good taste without interfering with the university's primary purpose of instructing students."

During this time, there was also a strong ROTC presence on campus. Their presence on campus and the academic credit they received for their service was called into question by both students and faculty in the spring of 1970, but Boyd said he could not abolish ROTC. The Alumni Review had an article called "ROTC: Alive and well at Iowa" in the December 1969 issue which helps provide a more complete picture of this period in history.

=== 2006 tornadoes ===
On the evening of April 13, 2006, a confirmed EF2 tornado struck Iowa City, causing severe property damage and displacing many from their homes, including many University of Iowa students. It was the first tornado ever recorded to hit the city directly. The tornado caused extensive property damage, with no fatalities reported. The impacts extended across the city's downtown business district, residential areas on the east side, and the university campus, affecting approximately 50+ properties

Several businesses along Riverside Drive and Iowa Highway 1 were destroyed. The 134-year-old Saint Patrick's Catholic Church was heavily damaged only minutes after Holy Thursday Mass, with most of its roof destroyed. Declared a total loss, the building was subsequently demolished. The downtown business district as well as the eastern residential area and several parks suffered scattered damage of varying degrees.

Additionally, several houses in the sorority row area were destroyed. The Alpha Chi Omega house was nearly destroyed, though no one was injured. The building was later razed. Cleanup efforts were underway almost immediately as local law enforcement, volunteer workers from all over the state, and Iowa City residents and college students worked together to restore the city. The total cost of damage was estimated at $12 million–$4 million of which was attributed to Iowa City and Johnson County property.

=== 2008 flood ===
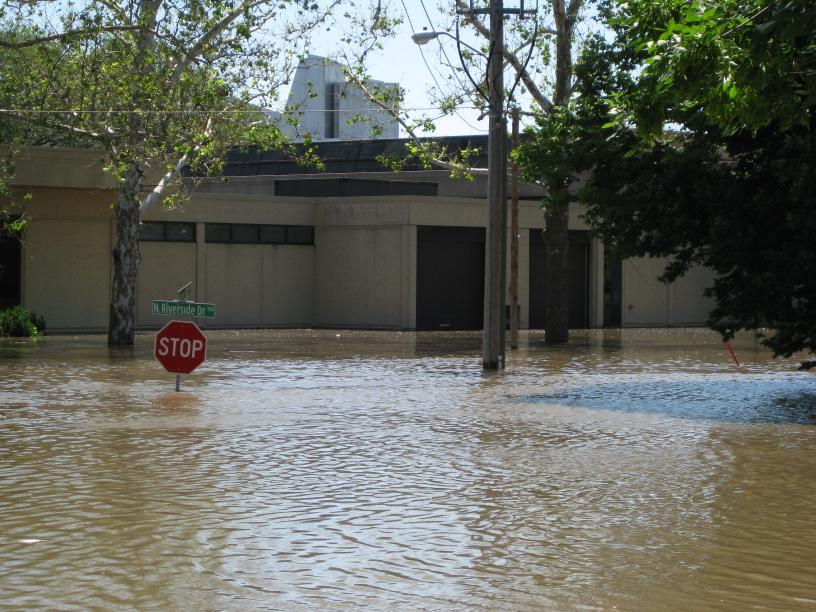
The University of Iowa Museum of Art on North Riverside Drive during the height of the flood

On June 11, 2008, water exceeded the emergency spillway at the Coralville Reservoir outside of Iowa City. As a result, the City of Iowa City and the University of Iowa were seriously affected by unprecedented flooding of the Iowa River, which caused widespread property damage and forced evacuations in large sections of the city. By Friday, June 13, 2008, the Iowa River had risen to a record level of 30.46 feet (9.28 m) (5:00 pm CST) with a crest of approximately 33 feet (10 m) predicted for Wednesday, June 18, 2008. Much of the city's 500-year floodplain saw mild to catastrophic effects of the rapidly flowing, polluted water. University of Iowa officials reported that 19 campus buildings sustained water damage during the flood, with several, including the main library, requiring extensive remediation. Extensive efforts to move materials from the university's main library were undertaken as large groups of sandbagging volunteers began to construct a massive levee near the building. Prior to the flooding of the fine arts campus, the university evacuated approximately $300 million worth of artwork to a secure facility in the Chicago area.

On Friday, June 13, university employees were encouraged to stay home, and travel was strongly discouraged in Iowa City; one city statement advised, "If you live in east Iowa City, stay in east Iowa City; if you live in west Iowa City, stay in west Iowa City." The Burlington St. bridge was the only bridge that remained open, other than the I-80 bridge on the edge of town, to connect the east and west sides of the Iowa River. On Saturday, June 14, officials at the University of Iowa began to power down the university's primary power-generating plant along the Iowa River to prevent structural damage. Backup units continued to provide necessary power and steam services for essential University services, including the University of Iowa Hospitals and Clinics. Water began touching the bottom of the Park Street bridge, forcing the Army Corps of Engineers to drill several holes in the bridge to allow air trapped underneath to escape. Also on Saturday, Mayor Regenia Bailey issued a curfew restricting anyone except those authorized by law enforcement from being within 100 yards (91 m) of any area affected by the flood between 8:30 pm and 6 am.

=== 2010s and environmental issues ===
On October 4, 2019, a Friday climate school strike with Greta Thunberg was held in Iowa City. During the strike, school youths protested against coal power.

== Geography and climate ==
Iowa City is located in eastern Iowa, along the Iowa River, on Interstate 80, approximately 60 miles (97 km) west of the Quad Cities (Davenport and Bettendorf, Iowa, and Moline and Rock Island, Illinois).

According to the United States Census Bureau, the city has a total area of 25.28 square miles (65.47 km^{2}), of which 25.01 square miles (64.78 km^{2}) is land and 0.27 square miles (0.70 km^{2}) is water.

The elevation at the Iowa City Municipal Airport is 668 ft (204 m) above sea level.

Iowa City has a humid continental climate, hot-summer subtype (Dfa in the Köppen climate classification). Average monthly temperatures range from about 22.8 °F (−5.1 °C) in January to 75.8 °F (24.3 °C) in July. Average monthly precipitation is lowest in winter and peaks significantly from May to August, with June being the average wettest month. Showers and thunderstorms are common from May to September, and can be severe, especially from May to July. In winter, snowfall is moderate, occasionally heavy in single storms. Snow cover is occasional in drier and/or warmer winter seasons, but (rarely) can be continuous in the coldest seasons, such as that of 1978–79. The Iowa City area was struck by a severe hailstorm on May 18, 1997, and by tornadoes on April 13, 2006. Relative to Oklahoma, Kansas, and Missouri, Iowa City's tornado frequency is comparatively low, though higher than northern Iowa locations.

Climate data for Iowa City, Iowa (1991–2020 normals, extremes 1893–present)
Month	Jan	Feb	Mar	Apr	May	Jun	Jul	Aug	Sep	Oct	Nov	Dec	Year
Record high °F (°C)	68 (20)	76 (24)	88 (31)	93 (34)	105 (41)	105 (41)	109 (43)	108 (42)	101 (38)	94 (34)	81 (27)	74 (23)	109 (43)
Mean maximum °F (°C)	51.8 (11.0)	56.8 (13.8)	72.7 (22.6)	82.3 (27.9)	88.6 (31.4)	93.2 (34.0)	95.4 (35.2)	94.7 (34.8)	91.0 (32.8)	84.3 (29.1)	69.3 (20.7)	55.8 (13.2)	97.2 (36.2)
Mean daily maximum °F (°C)	29.3 (−1.5)	34.3 (1.3)	47.9 (8.8)	61.6 (16.4)	72.2 (22.3)	81.0 (27.2)	84.4 (29.1)	82.4 (28.0)	76.3 (24.6)	63.2 (17.3)	47.5 (8.6)	34.4 (1.3)	59.5 (15.3)
Daily mean °F (°C)	20.5 (−6.4)	24.9 (−3.9)	37.2 (2.9)	49.4 (9.7)	60.6 (15.9)	70.0 (21.1)	73.5 (23.1)	71.3 (21.8)	64.0 (17.8)	51.6 (10.9)	37.5 (3.1)	26.0 (−3.3)	48.9 (9.4)
Mean daily minimum °F (°C)	11.6 (−11.3)	15.5 (−9.2)	26.6 (−3.0)	37.1 (2.8)	48.9 (9.4)	59.0 (15.0)	62.5 (16.9)	60.2 (15.7)	51.6 (10.9)	39.9 (4.4)	27.6 (−2.4)	17.5 (−8.1)	38.2 (3.4)
Mean minimum °F (°C)	−9.5 (−23.1)	−3.1 (−19.5)	8.1 (−13.3)	24.7 (−4.1)	36.0 (2.2)	48.9 (9.4)	54.9 (12.7)	52.5 (11.4)	38.9 (3.8)	26.1 (−3.3)	13.0 (−10.6)	−1.6 (−18.7)	−13.6 (−25.3)
Record low °F (°C)	−32 (−36)	−32 (−36)	−17 (−27)	10 (−12)	24 (−4)	37 (3)	40 (4)	38 (3)	20 (−7)	4 (−16)	−6 (−21)	−27 (−33)	−32 (−36)
Average precipitation inches (mm)	1.14 (29)	1.40 (36)	2.33 (59)	3.86 (98)	5.05 (128)	5.49 (139)	4.56 (116)	4.32 (110)	3.45 (88)	3.00 (76)	2.27 (58)	1.60 (41)	38.47 (977)
Average snowfall inches (cm)	7.6 (19)	7.5 (19)	3.2 (8.1)	0.5 (1.3)	0.0 (0.0)	0.0 (0.0)	0.0 (0.0)	0.0 (0.0)	0.0 (0.0)	0.4 (1.0)	1.1 (2.8)	7.2 (18)	27.5 (70)
Average extreme snow depth inches (cm)	7.4 (19)	6.4 (16)	2.8 (7.1)	0.5 (1.3)	0.0 (0.0)	0.0 (0.0)	0.0 (0.0)	0.0 (0.0)	0.0 (0.0)	0.1 (0.25)	1.0 (2.5)	4.6 (12)	9.7 (25)
Average precipitation days (≥ 0.01 in)	7.4	7.0	8.7	11.4	12.6	11.2	8.8	8.9	8.4	9.0	7.6	8.2	109.2
Average snowy days (≥ 0.1 in)	4.0	3.5	1.5	0.3	0.0	0.0	0.0	0.0	0.0	0.2	0.6	4.0	14.1
Source: NOAA

== Demographics ==
Historical populations
Year	Pop.	±%
1850	1,250	—
1860	5,214	+317.1%
1870	5,914	+13.4%
1880	7,123	+20.4%
1890	7,016	−1.5%
1900	7,987	+13.8%
1910	10,091	+26.3%
1920	11,267	+11.7%
1930	15,340	+36.1%
1940	17,182	+12.0%
1950	27,212	+58.4%
1960	33,443	+22.9%
1970	46,850	+40.1%
1980	50,508	+7.8%
1990	59,735	+18.3%
2000	62,220	+4.2%
2010	67,862	+9.1%
2020	74,828	+10.3%
Source:"U.S. Census website". United States Census Bureau. and Iowa Data Center (PDF); Source: U.S. Decennial Census

Iowa City is commonly known as a college town. It is home to the University of Iowa. The population increases during the months when school is in session.

As of the 2010 census, about 58.0% of adults held a bachelor's degree or higher and 79.7% were white alone, not Hispanic or Latino, 6.2% were Asian alone, and 5.8% were black alone, while the median household income was $41,410, about $10,000 less than the state median.

=== Racial and ethnic composition ===
Iowa City city, Iowa – Racial and ethnic composition Note: the US Census treats Hispanic/Latino as an ethnic category. This table excludes Latinos from the racial categories and assigns them to a separate category. Hispanics/Latinos may be of any race.
Race / Ethnicity (NH = Non-Hispanic)	Pop 2000	Pop 2010	Pop 2020	% 2000	% 2010	% 2020
White alone (NH)	53,405	54,103	52,796	85.83%	79.73%	70.56%
Black or African American alone (NH)	2,272	3,805	7,574	3.65%	5.61%	10.12%
Native American or Alaska Native alone (NH)	175	107	76	0.28%	0.16%	0.10%
Asian alone (NH)	3,492	4,655	5,457	5.61%	6.86%	7.29%
Native Hawaiian or Pacific Islander alone (NH)	26	26	12	0.04%	0.04%	0.02%
Other race alone (NH)	131	136	327	0.21%	0.20%	0.44%
Mixed race or Multiracial (NH)	886	1,403	3,135	1.42%	2.07%	4.19%
Hispanic or Latino (any race)	1,833	3,627	5,451	2.95%	5.34%	7.28%
Total	62,220	67,862	74,828	100.00%	100.00%	100.00%

=== 2020 census ===
As of the 2020 census, Iowa City had a population of 74,828 and 30,291 households, including 13,206 families. The population density was 2,923.3 inhabitants per square mile (1,128.7/km^{2}). There were 32,854 housing units at an average density of 1,283.5 per square mile (495.6/km^{2}). 99.8% of residents lived in urban areas, while 0.2% lived in rural areas.

The median age was 27.1 years. 15.8% of residents were under the age of 18 and 21.0% were under 20; 24.3% were between the ages of 20 and 24; 27.1% were from 25 to 44; 16.1% were from 45 to 64; and 11.6% were 65 years of age or older. The gender makeup of the city was 49.0% male and 51.0% female; for every 100 females there were 96.1 males, and for every 100 females age 18 and over there were 94.5 males age 18 and over.

Of the 30,291 households, 20.4% had children under the age of 18 living in them, 32.9% were married-couple households, and 7.1% were cohabitating couples. 32.4% had a female householder with no spouse or partner present and 27.6% had a male householder with no spouse or partner present; 56.4% of all households were non-families. About 36.2% of all households were made up of individuals and 9.2% had someone living alone who was 65 years of age or older.

Housing units had a vacancy rate of 7.8%, including a homeowner vacancy rate of 2.2% and a rental vacancy rate of 7.8%.

Racial composition as of the 2020 census
Race	Number	Percent
White	54,277	72.5%
Black or African American	7,664	10.2%
American Indian and Alaska Native	132	0.2%
Asian	5,482	7.3%
Native Hawaiian and Other Pacific Islander	12	0.0%
Some other race	2,270	3.0%
Two or more races	4,991	6.7%

=== 2010 census ===
As of the census of 2010, there were 67,862 people, 27,657 households, and 11,743 families residing in the city. The population density was 2,713.4 inhabitants per square mile (1,047.6/km^{2}). There were 29,270 housing units at an average density of 1,170.3 units per square mile (451.9 units/km^{2}). The racial makeup of the city was 82.5% White, 5.8% African American, 0.2% Native American, 6.9% Asian, 2.1% from other races, and 2.5% from two or more races. Hispanic or Latino people of any race were 5.3% of the population.

There were 27,657 households, of which 19.8% had children under the age of 18 living with them, 32.5% were married couples living together, 7.2% had a female householder with no husband present, 2.8% had a male householder with no wife present, and 57.5% were non-families. 34.3% of all households were made up of individuals, and 7% had someone living alone who was 65 years of age or older. The average household size was 2.22 and the average family size was 2.88.

The median age in the city was 25.6 years. 14.9% of residents were under the age of 18; 33.4% were between the ages of 18 and 24; 25.7% were from 25 to 44; 17.8% were from 45 to 64; and 8.2% were 65 years of age or older. The gender makeup of the city was 49.7% male and 50.3% female.

=== 2000 census ===
As of the census of 2000, there were 62,220 people, 25,202 households, and 11,189 families residing in the city. The population density was 2,575.0 inhabitants per square mile (994.2/km^{2}). There were 26,083 housing units at an average density of 1,079.4 units per square mile (416.8 units/km^{2}). The racial makeup of the city was 87.33% White, 3.75% African American, 0.31% American Indian, 5.64% Asian, 0.04% Pacific Islander, 1.25% from other races, and 1.68% from two or more races. Hispanic or Latino people of any race were 2.95% of the population.

There were 25,202 households, out of which 21.2% had children under the age of 18 living with them, 35.2% were married couples living together, 2% were households with same-sex couples (2000 U.S. Census), 3.7% had a female householder with no husband present, and 55.6% were non-families. 33.8% of all households were made up of individuals, and 6.1% had someone living alone who was 65 years of age or older. The average household size was 2.23 and the average family size was 2.90.

Age spread: 16.2% under the age of 18, 32.8% from 18 to 24, 28.1% from 25 to 44, 15.9% from 45 to 64, and 7.0% who were 65 years of age or older. The median age was 25 years. For every 100 females, there were 96.2 males. For every 100 females age 18 and over, there were 94.3 males.

The median income for a household in the city was $34,977, and the median income for a family was $57,568. Males had a median income of $35,435 versus $28,981 for females. The per capita income for the city was $20,269. About 2.7% of families and 4.7% of the population were below the poverty line, including 10.2% of those under age 18 and 3.0% of those age 65 or over.

=== Metropolitan area ===
The Iowa City Metropolitan Statistical Area originally comprised Johnson County alone. The U.S. Census Bureau expanded the MSA to include Washington County following the 2000 census, increasing the metro population to 152,586 by 2010.

Iowa City is contiguous with Coralville to the northwest. University Heights is completely contained within the boundaries of Iowa City, near Kinnick Stadium. Tiffin, North Liberty, Solon, and Hills are other towns within a few miles.

The Iowa City MSA and the nearby Cedar Rapids MSA are collectively a Combined Statistical Area (CSA). This CSA along with two additional counties are known as the Iowa City-Cedar Rapids (ICR) Corridor and collectively have a population of over 450,000.

== Economy ==
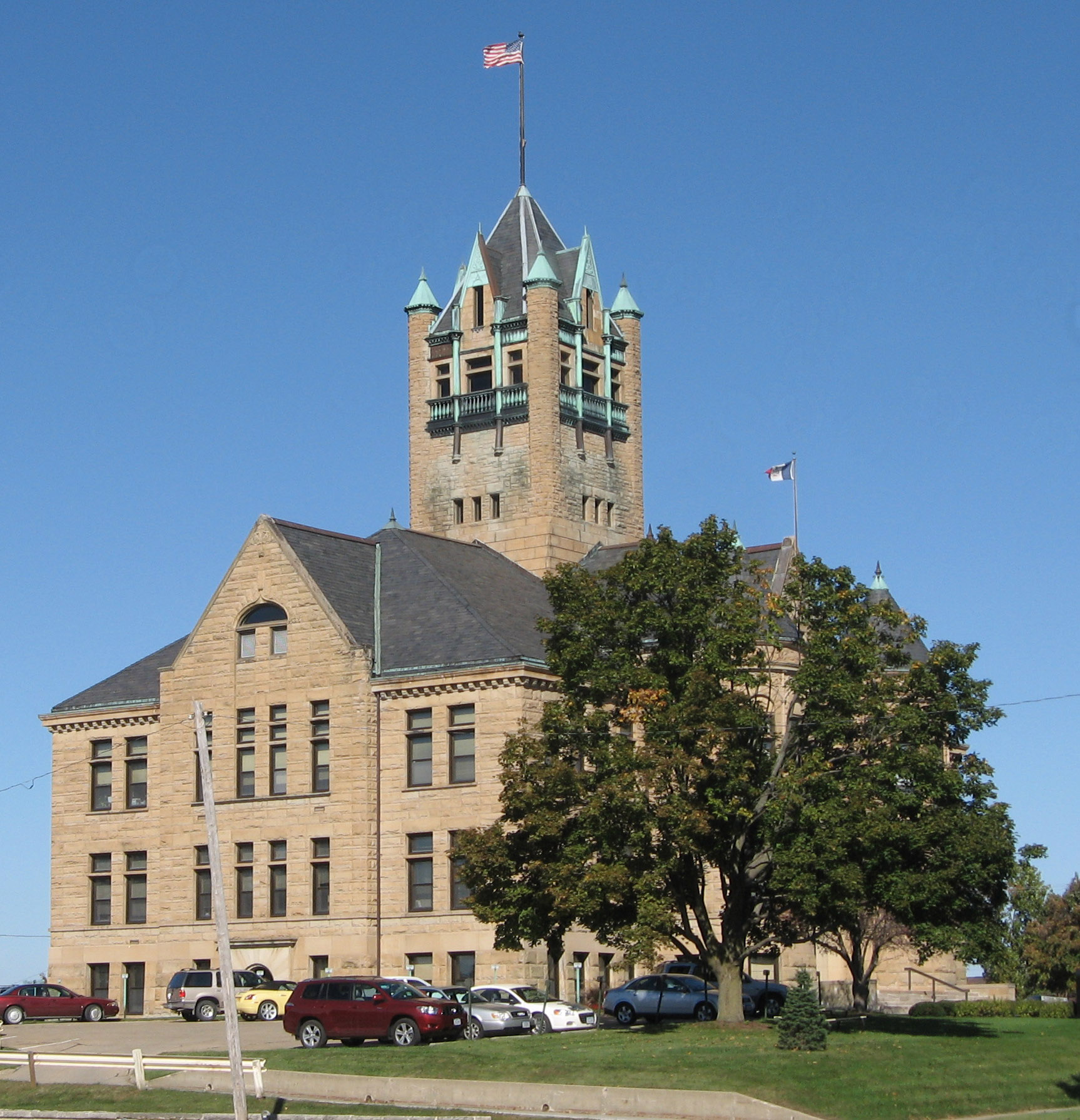
Johnson County Courthouse

Iowa City is home to the University of Iowa Hospitals and Clinics (UIHC), the state's only comprehensive tertiary care medical center. The Holden Comprehensive Cancer Center in Iowa City is an NCI-designated Cancer Center, one of fewer than 60 in the country.

ACT Inc., which develops the ACT standardized college admissions test and provides educational assessment services, operates its global headquarters in Iowa City, employing approximately 1,200 people locally.

=== Top employers ===
According to Iowa City's 2024 Comprehensive Annual Financial Report, the top employers in the city are:

#	Employer	Employees
1	University of Iowa Hospitals & Clinics	15,500
2	University of Iowa	10,300
3	Iowa City Community School District	2,000
4	VA Medical Center	2,000
5	Procter & Gamble	1,300
6	City of Iowa City	988
7	ACT Inc	985
8	Pearson	800
9	Goodwill of the Heartland	638
10	Systems Unlimited	500

== Arts and culture ==
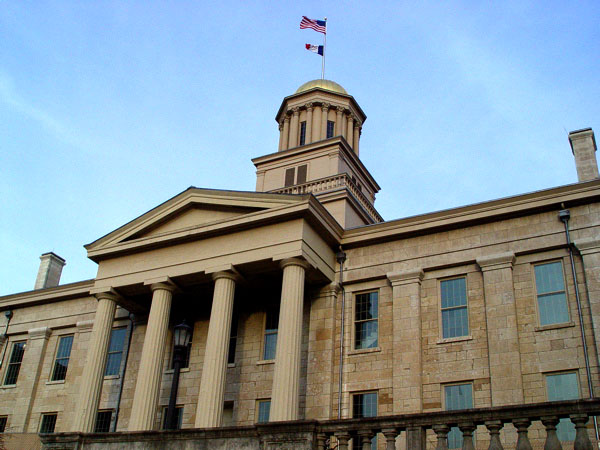
The Old Capitol Building is today a museum about the building, the University of Iowa, and Iowa's history

In the early 1970s, the Old Capitol was renovated and university administrative offices were relocated to Jessup Hall. All but one of the major rooms were restored to their appearance when Iowa City was the state capital. In November 2001, the cupola caught fire during the renovation of its gold leaf dome. The cupola was destroyed and the building was heavily damaged. In 2006, after an extensive restoration, the building reopened to the public. The building now serves as the Old Capitol Museum, as well as a venue for speeches, lectures, press conferences and performances in the original state senate chamber.

The Iowa Avenue Literary Walk, a series of bronze relief panels that feature authors' words as well as attribution, is a tribute to the city's rich literary history. The panels are visually connected by a series of general quotations about books and writing stamped into the concrete sidewalk. All 49 authors and playwrights featured in the Literary Walk were born in Iowa, lived there significantly, or set major literary works in the state.

In November 2008, UNESCO designated Iowa City as the world's third City of Literature, making it a part of the UNESCO Creative Cities Network. Iowa City remained the sole American City of Literature until Seattle received the same designation in 2017.

In 2004, the Old Capitol Cultural District was one of the first Cultural Districts certified by the State of Iowa. The district extends from the University of Iowa Pentacrest, south to the Johnson County Courthouse, east to College Green Park, and north into the historic Northside Neighborhood.

=== Cultural events ===
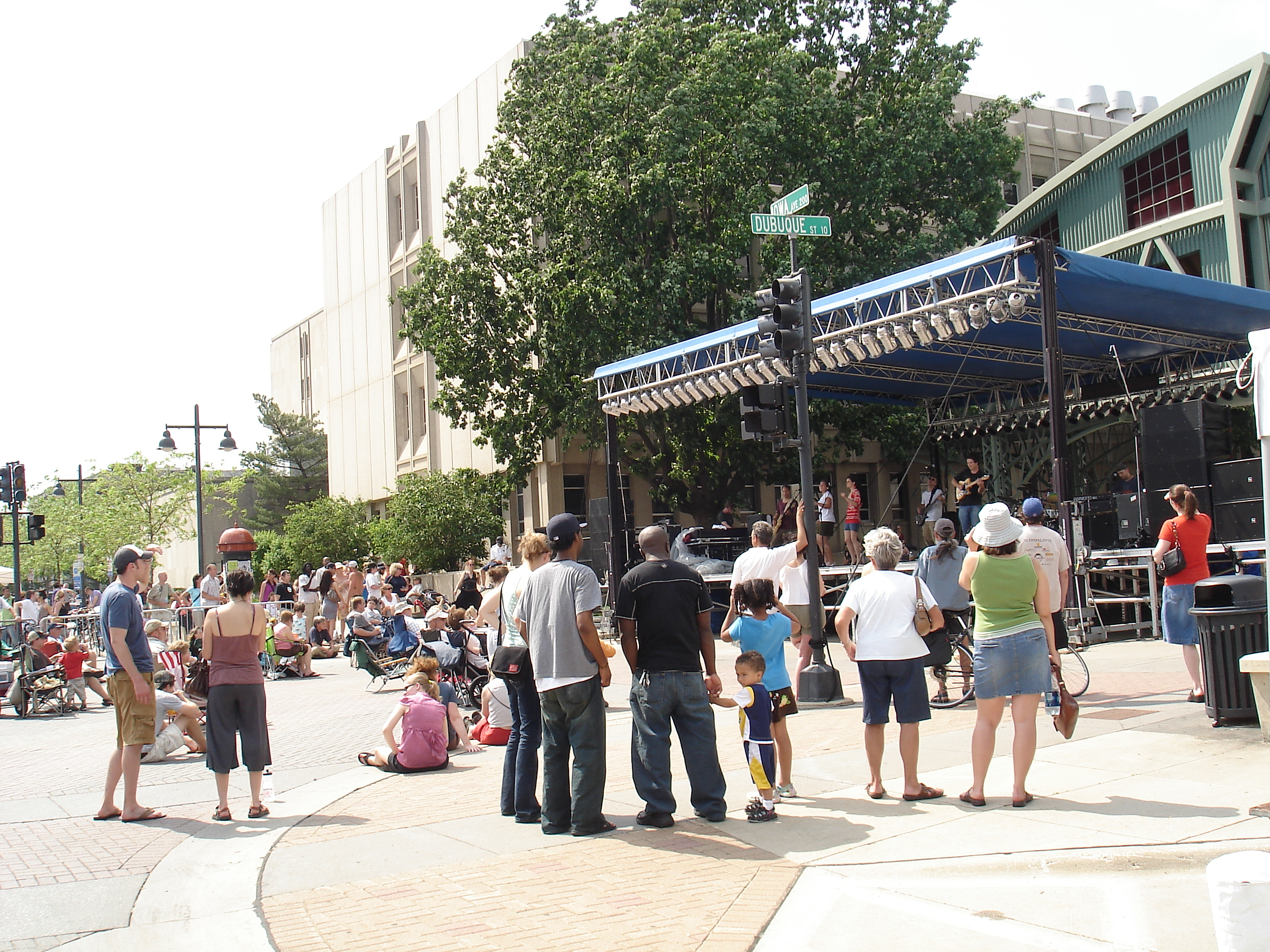
Iowa Arts Festival

Iowa City has a variety of cultural events. It has a strong literary history and is the home of the Iowa Writers' Workshop, whose graduates include John Irving, Flannery O'Connor, T.C. Boyle, and many other prominent U.S. authors; the nation's leading Non-Fiction Writing Program; the Iowa Playwrights' Workshop; the Iowa Summer Writing Festival; and the International Writing Program, a unique residency program that has hosted writers from more than 120 countries.

Iowa City also sponsors a variety of events in the Summer of the Arts program. These include Iowa City Jazz Festival, Iowa Arts Festival, open-air summer movies series called Saturday Night Free Movie Series and free concerts every Friday night in the pedestrian mall called the Friday Night Concert Series (Ped Mall).

The Iowa City Book Festival began as an annual summer event in 2009 sponsored by the University of Iowa Libraries and in 2013 it was moved to October when management was handed off to the Iowa City UNESCO City of Literature. It features readings from prominent authors and literature themed events.

The Iowa Biennial Exhibition [TIBE] began in 2004 as an international survey of contemporary miniature printmaking held at the University of Iowa. The 2006 exhibition, received a 2007 "ICKY" award nomination in Visual Arts Programming from the Iowa Cultural Corridor Alliance for its exhibition at the University of Iowa's Project Art Gallery.

Downtown Iowa City arts venues include the historic Englert Theatre, a live music and performing arts center; Riverside Theatre, a professional theatre company with an annual season that includes an outdoor Shakespeare festival; and FilmScene, a non-profit film organization and art house movie theater with two locations and five screens plus a seasonal outdoor cinema.

The Englert Theatre produces Mission Creek Festival each spring, focusing on community events, performance and literary programming featuring over 100 writers each year. Witching Hour takes place each fall and focuses on exploring the unknown, discussing the creative process and presenting new work.

Refocus Film Festival occurs annually in downtown Iowa City. This festival specializes in films that are adaptations of existing work

=== Local landmarks ===
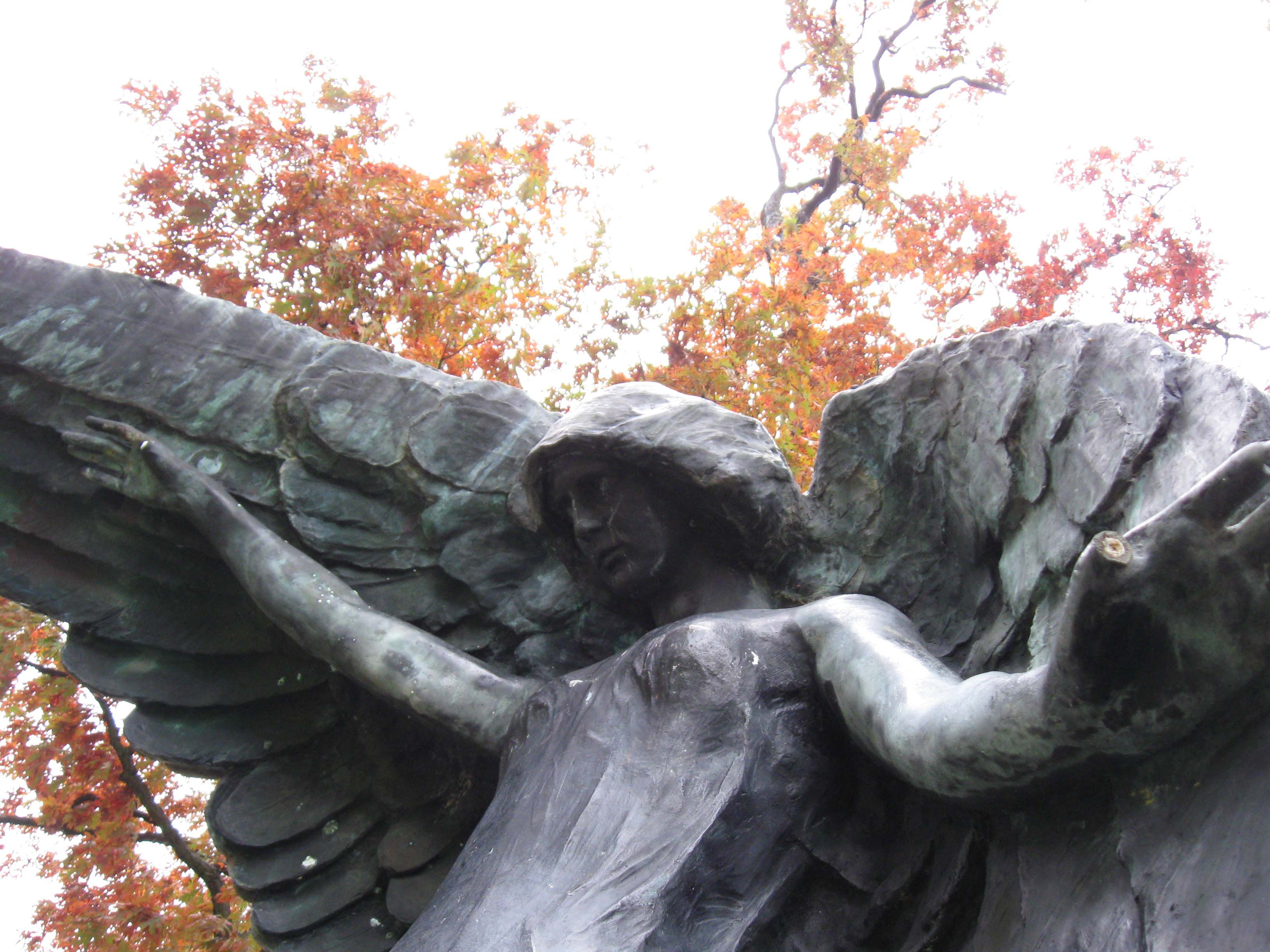
The "Black Angel" in Oakland Cemetery

- Hancher Auditorium often hosts nationally touring theater, dance and musical shows, and has commissioned more than 100 works of music, theater and dance during the last 20 years. This facility was badly damaged during the Iowa flood of 2008 and the facility has been rebuilt farther uphill, away from the Iowa River and reopened in Fall of 2016.
- Hamburg Inn No. 2 is a favorite campaign stop for political candidates. It was featured in a 2005 episode of the political drama The West Wing. It has also been a favored campaign stop for many U.S. Presidents, including Bill Clinton and Ronald Reagan. It was featured in The New York Times for its widely renowned "pie shakes".
- Oakland Cemetery contains graves of notable locals as well as the "Black Angel" statue.
- Plum Grove Historic House was the residence of Robert Lucas, the first territorial governor of Iowa, and the novelist Eleanor Hoyt Brainerd.
- Moffitt cottages, built in a unique vernacular architectural style, are scattered around eastern Iowa City. Moffitt cottages feature an unconventional vernacular architectural style with asymmetrical proportions and decorative elements that distinguish them throughout eastern Iowa City.
- Prospect Hill
- Ned Ashton House, built as a private residence by Iowa bridge engineer Ned Ashton in 1947, was placed on the National Register of Historic Places in 2001. Today, it is a popular venue that can accommodate up to 100 people for meetings, reunions, parties, weddings and receptions along the banks of the Iowa River.
- The James Theater is a black box theatre located in the Northside district of downtown Iowa City. It hosts performances from local theatre groups and musicians. It was the previous location of Riverside Theatre.
- Vogt House, a house in which Kurt Vonnegut lived.

=== Pedestrian Mall ===
City Plaza (commonly called the Pedestrian Mall or simply Ped Mall) serves as a gathering place for students and locals and draws large crowds for its summertime events such as the Friday Night Concert Series and the annual Iowa City Jazz Festival and Iowa City Arts Festival. The Ped Mall area contains restaurants, bars, retail, hotels, and the Iowa City Public Library. The area functions as a cultural and social hub, featuring numerous restaurants, bars, and retail establishments, alongside the Iowa City Public Library. The Coldren Opera House was located on the street which has now become the mall.

== Sports ==
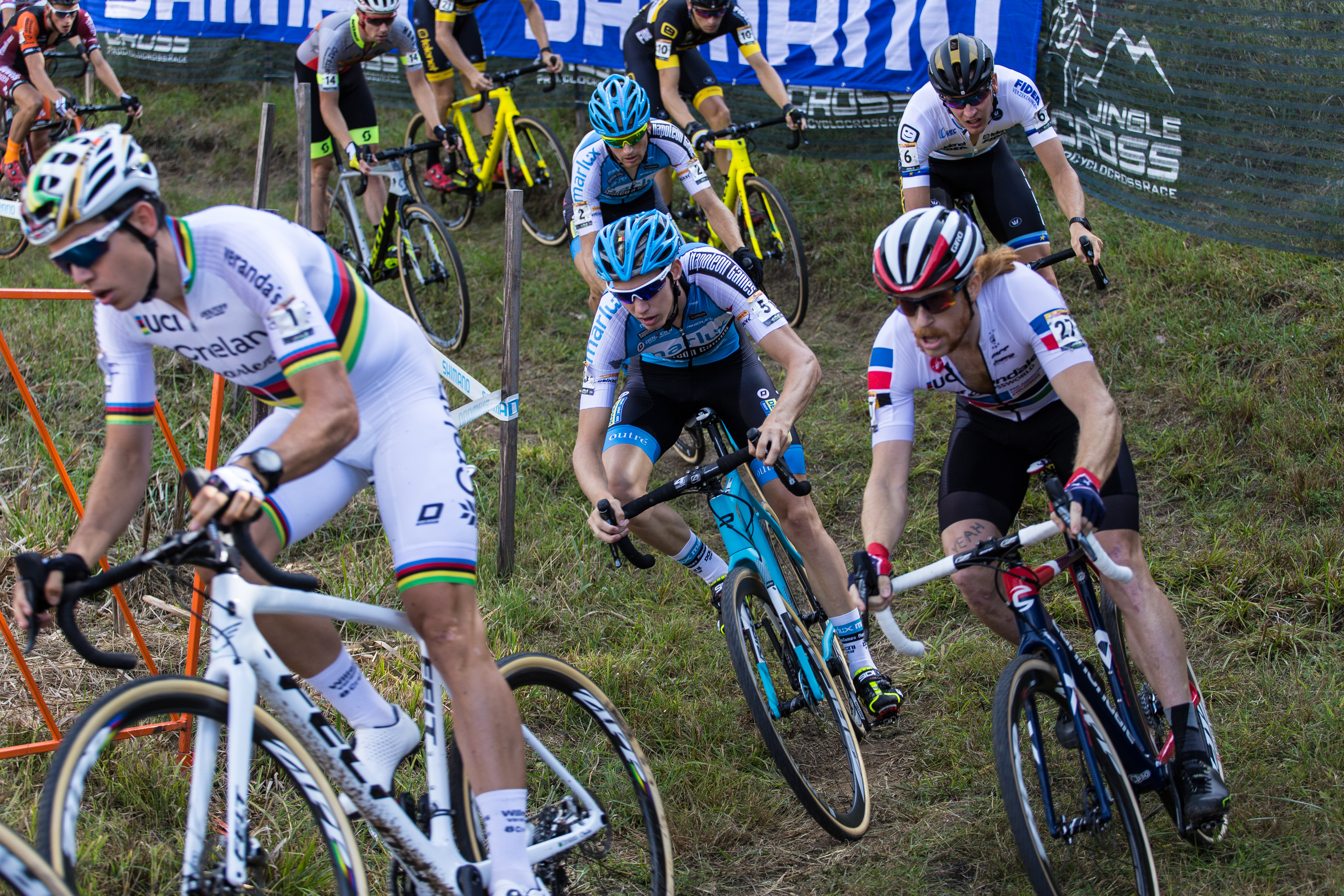
Cyclists competing in the Jingle Cross

Iowa City is home to the University of Iowa's athletic teams, known as the Iowa Hawkeyes. A member of the Big Ten Conference, the football team plays at Kinnick Stadium, while men's and women's basketball, volleyball, and the wrestling and gymnastics teams compete at Carver-Hawkeye Arena. The Hawkeyes football team regularly sends players to the NFL, including Super Bowl Champion all-pro Baltimore Ravens guard Marshal Yanda, 2004 2nd overall draft pick Robert Gallery, and San Francisco 49ers tight end George Kittle, among many others. Kirk Ferentz is the longest tenured head coach in NCAA FBS dating back to the 1999–2000 season.

Iowa City's three public high schools, City, West, and Liberty, are members of the Mississippi Valley Conference. Regina competes in the River Valley Conference.

The Iowa City Gold Sox were a semi-professional baseball team that called Iowa City home from 1912 through 1913.

== Parks and recreation ==
Iowa City is home to many public spaces. Most of the facilities are operated by the City of Iowa City Parks & Recreation Department, while some are owned by the University of Iowa, and others held by private entities such as the Bur Oak Land Trust.

Some of the more significant parks include Waterworks Prairie Park which is a naturalized sand pit and the largest park in the city at 231 acres (93 hectares). City Park contains the Bobby Oldis Fields, an outdoor pool complex, many picnic areas and playgrounds, as well as the Riverside Festival Stage. Hickory Hill Park is a large wooded park on the north side of town. Hubbard Park is a green space directly south of the Iowa Memorial Union building and is used for many campus events.

There are three golf courses within city limits. Finkbine Golf Course is an 18-hole course owned by the University of Iowa. Pleasant Valley Golf Course is a public 18-hole course located south along the Iowa River. Elks Lodge Country Club is a private 9-hole course located near the Peninsula Neighborhood.

The Iowa City Kickers Soccer Complex can hold more than 17 soccer fields depending on layout and is home to the Iowa City Kickers soccer club. Napoleon Park is located along the Iowa River and has 8 baseball diamonds. Bobby Oldis Fields are located within City Park and has 8 baseball diamonds. Hawkeye Recreation Fields is in the University of Iowa and consists of 12 soccer fields, 4 beach volleyball pitches, and 4 basketball courts. The Bill and Jim Ashton Cross Country Course is one of the few dedicated cross country courses in the country. The University of Iowa also operates the Fieldhouse, Campus Recreation & Wellness Center, and Hawkeye Tennis & Recreation Complex which contain fitness space as well as indoor sports pitches and pools.

Iowa City has many miles of cycling trails. There are dedicated trails along the Iowa River, Clear Creek, Willow Creek, and Ralston Creek. The Iowa City trail system connects to the northwest to Coralville, Tiffin, and North Liberty's trail systems.

== Government ==
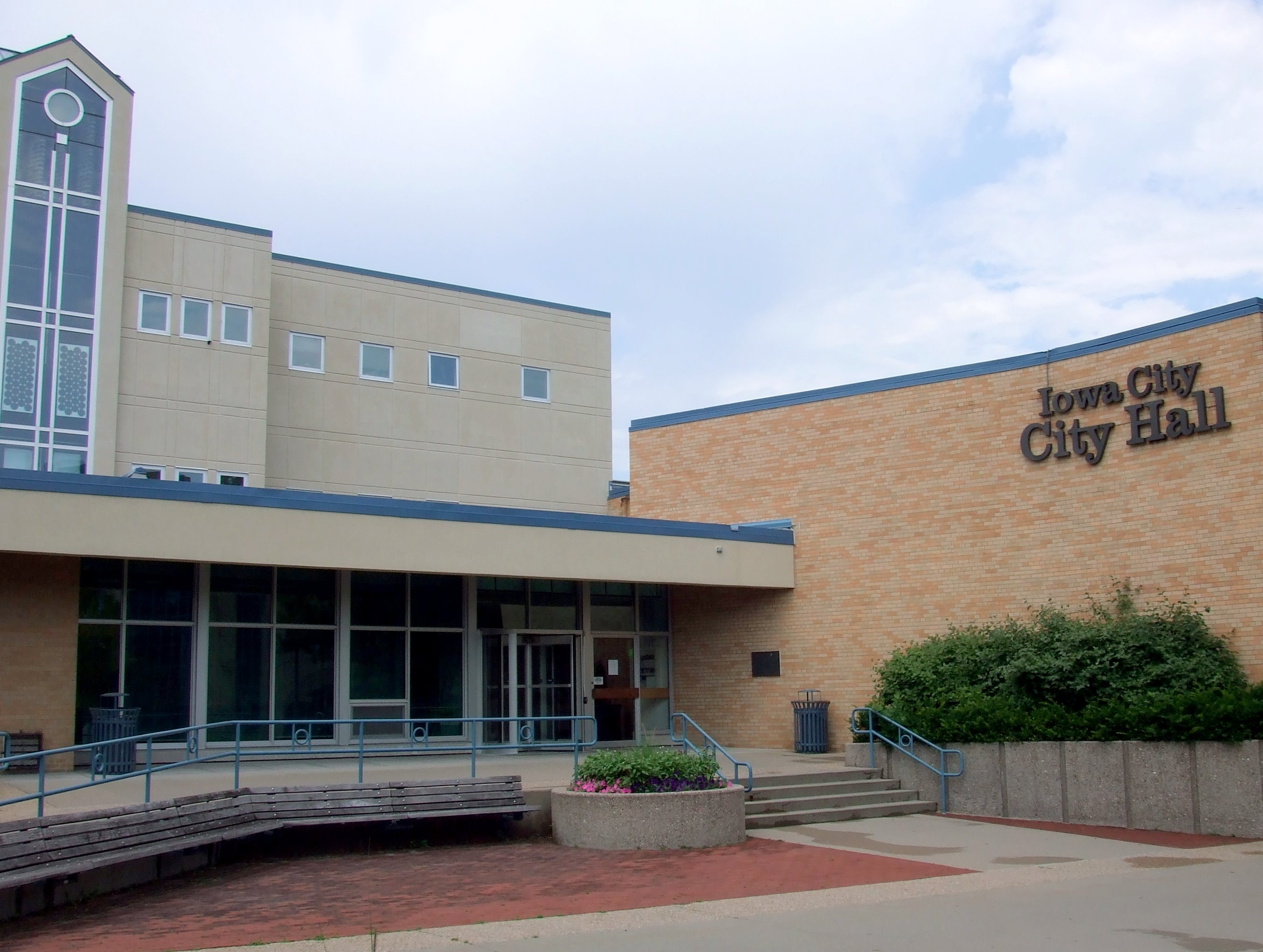
City hall

Iowa City is governed by an elected city council of seven members: four council members at large and three district members. The two council members at large who receive the most votes and the three district council members serve four-year terms. The other two council members at large serve two-year terms. A mayor and mayor pro tem are elected by the council from within its members to serve terms of two years.

Under this form of council-manager government, the powers of the city are vested in the city council. The council is responsible for appointing the city manager (as of 2016 Geoff Fruin) who implements the policy decisions of the city council, enforces city ordinances and appoints city officials. The council selects the mayor and appoints the city attorney and city clerk.

Iowa City is unusual in that it is one of only four cities in Iowa in which the mayor is chosen by the city council. The mayor of Iowa City serves a two-year term from amongst the members of the council. The mayor is primarily a figurehead or a "first among equals", with some power to set agendas and lead meetings, as well as serving as the public face of city government.

== Education ==
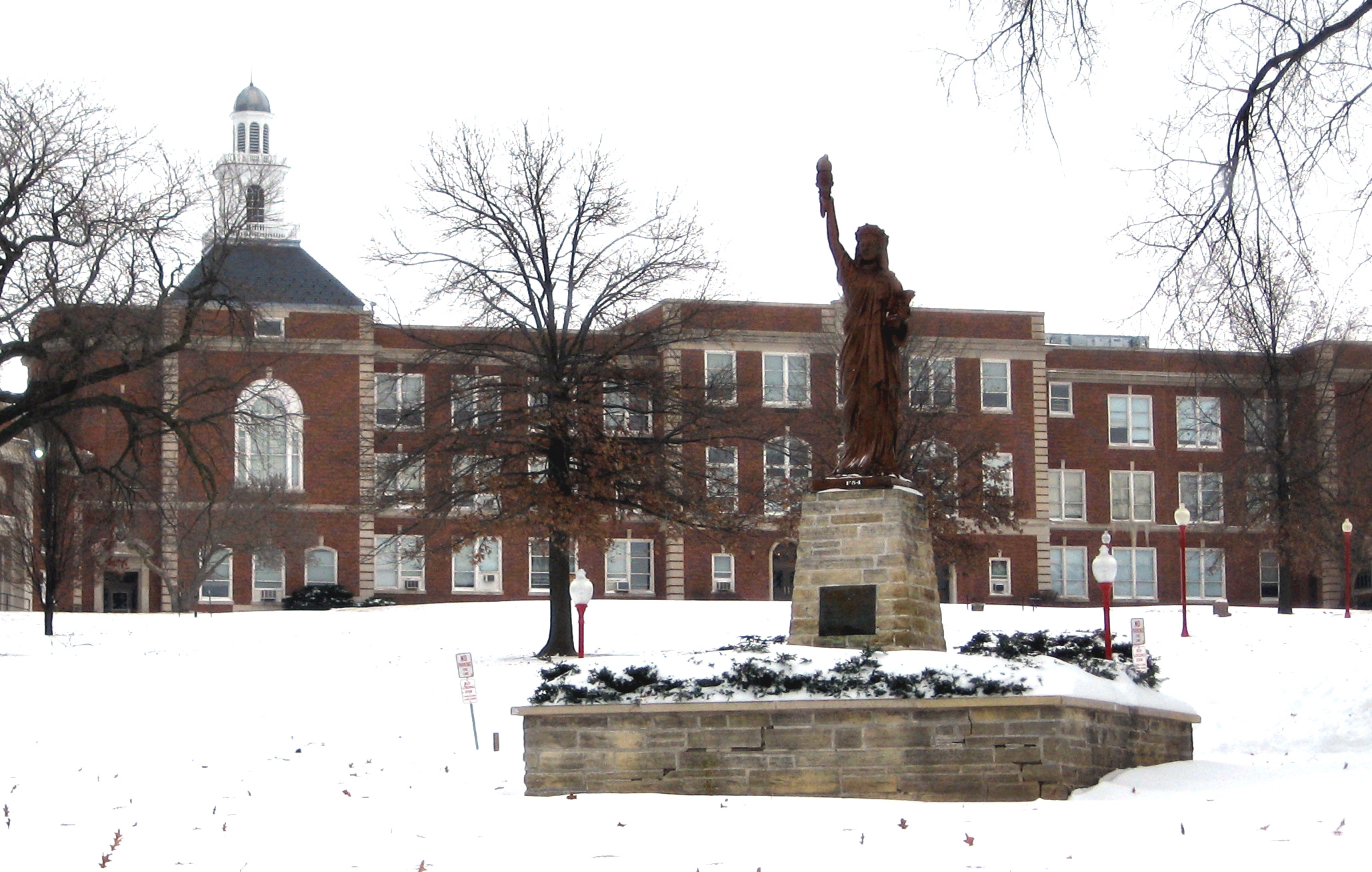
Iowa City High School

The Iowa City Community School District operates four public high schools in Iowa City, Coralville, and North Liberty, Iowa. Iowa City High School, Iowa City West High School, Liberty High School and Elizabeth Tate Alternative High School are the four public high schools. Iowa City is also home to the private PK-12 school district, Regina Catholic Education Center.

Founded in 1847, the University of Iowa enrolls approximately 31,000 students across more than 200 degree programs, ranging from undergraduate to doctoral studies. The university includes a medical school and one of the United States' largest university-owned teaching hospitals, providing patient care within 16 medical specialties. The University of Iowa College of Law is located there.

The Iowa City Japanese School (アイオワシティ補習授業校 Aiowa Shiti Hoshū Jugyō Kō), a weekend educational program for Japanese nationals, provides Japanese language instruction, holding its classes at Zion Lutheran Church.

== Media ==
Three radio stations are based at the University of Iowa. Two have become part of the statewide Iowa Public Radio network: WSUI 910 AM, a National Public Radio affiliate and originator of some Iowa Public Radio news and talk programming; and KSUI 91.7 FM, which broadcasts classical music and concerts by Iowa classical orchestras, opera companies, and other artists, as well as interviews. KCCK-FM is Iowa's only Jazz station and affiliated with Public Radio International. KRUI 89.7 FM is the university's student-run radio station.

iHeartMedia owns two of the Iowa City area's commercial radio stations: KXIC 800 AM, a news/talk station, and KKRQ 100.7 FM, a classic rock station. KCJJ 1630 AM is an independently owned, 10,000-watt station that broadcasts a mixture of talk radio and Hot AC music programming along with area high school football and basketball games and NASCAR racing. Another Iowa City-licensed station, KRNA 94.1 FM, now broadcasts from Cedar Rapids and is operated by Cumulus Media. Radio signals from other cities, including Cedar Rapids and the Quad Cities, also reach the Iowa City area.

Iowa City and Johnson County are part of the Cedar Rapids-Waterloo-Iowa City-Dubuque media market, which was ranked 87th by Nielsen Media Research for the 2007–2008 TV season. Two television stations, KIIN channel 12 (PBS) and KWKB channel 20 (Court TV Mystery), are licensed to Iowa City. KCRG-TV 9, the ABC affiliate in Cedar Rapids, maintains a news bureau at Old Capitol Mall in downtown Iowa City.

Mediacom, a local cable television franchisee, provides channel space for seven Public, educational, and government access (PEG) cable TV channels in Iowa City: City Channel 4, Infovision (channel 5), Kirkwood Television Services (channel 11), Public Access Television (channel 18), the Iowa City Public Library Channel (channel 20), and the Iowa City Community School District's channel 21.

Two daily newspapers are published in Iowa City. The Iowa City Press-Citizen, owned by Gannett, publishes six days a week with Gannett's Des Moines Sunday Register standing in as a Sunday edition. The Daily Iowan, an independent newspaper based at the University of Iowa, publishes Monday through Friday while classes are in session. In addition, The Gazette of Cedar Rapids maintains a news bureau in Iowa City.

Little Village is an independent alt-weekly magazine covering Iowa City and Cedar Rapids metropolitan areas.

== Transportation ==
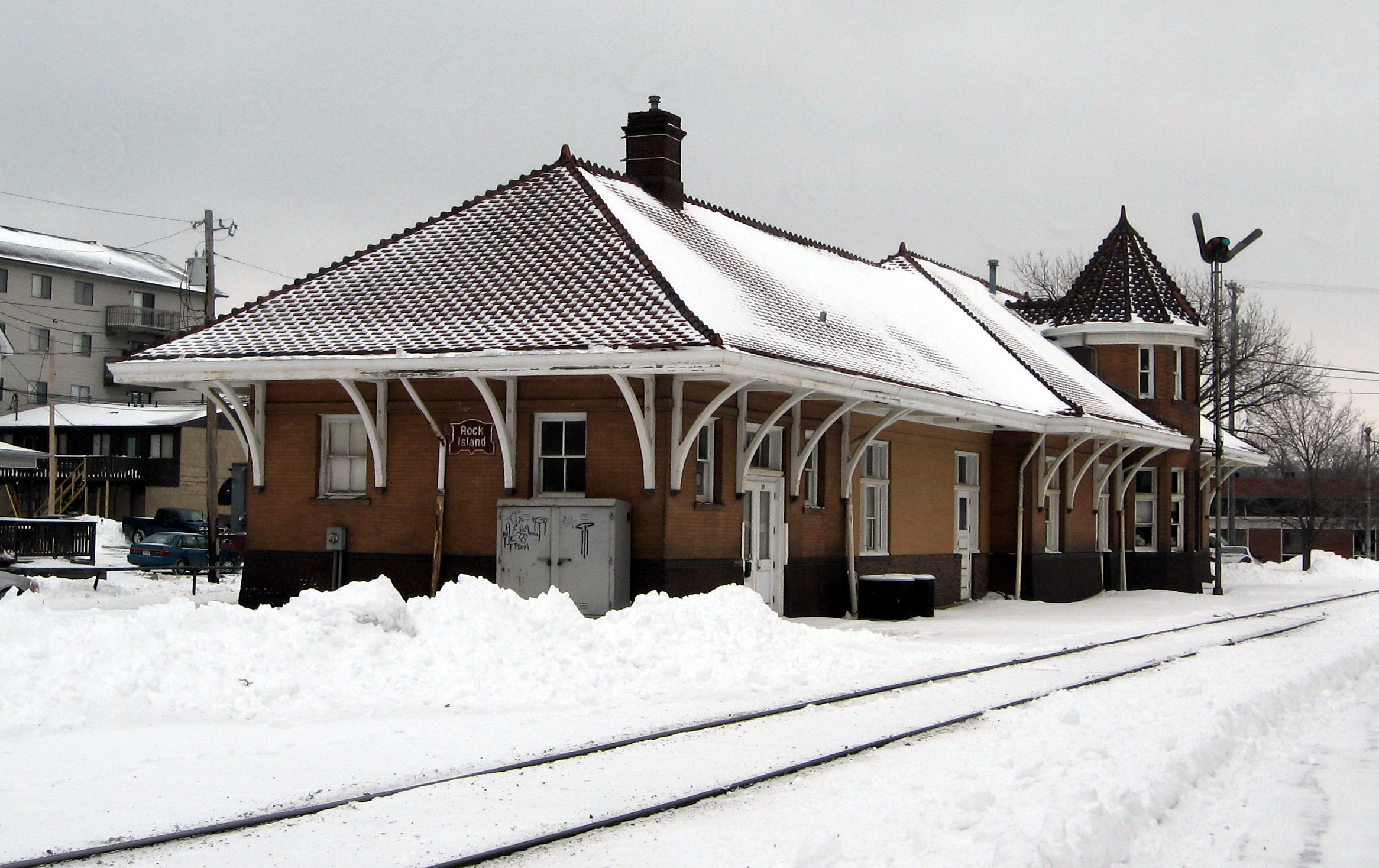
Iowa City Depot

Iowa City has a general aviation airport, the Iowa City Municipal Airport, on the south side of the city. The Eastern Iowa Airport, 20 miles (32 km) to the northwest, serves Iowa City and Cedar Rapids with scheduled passenger flights.

Interstate 80 runs east–west along the north edge of Iowa City. U.S. Highway 218 and Iowa Highway 27 (the Avenue of the Saints) are co-signed along a freeway bypassing Iowa City to the west. U.S. Highway 6 and Iowa Highway 1 also run through Iowa City.

Iowa City is served by the freight-only Iowa Interstate Railroad and the Cedar Rapids and Iowa City Railway (CRANDIC). The historic Iowa City Depot, shown in the picture at left, is no longer in use for railway services; it has been modified into a commercial office building.

In 2009, the Iowa City metropolitan statistical area (MSA) ranked as the seventh highest (tied with Hinesville-Fort Stewart, Georgia MSA) in the United States for percentage of commuters who walked to work (8.2 percent). In 2013, the Iowa City MSA ranked as the sixth lowest in the United States for percentage of workers who commuted by private automobile (73.4 percent). During the same year, 11.1 percent of Iowa City area commuters walked to work.

=== Buses ===
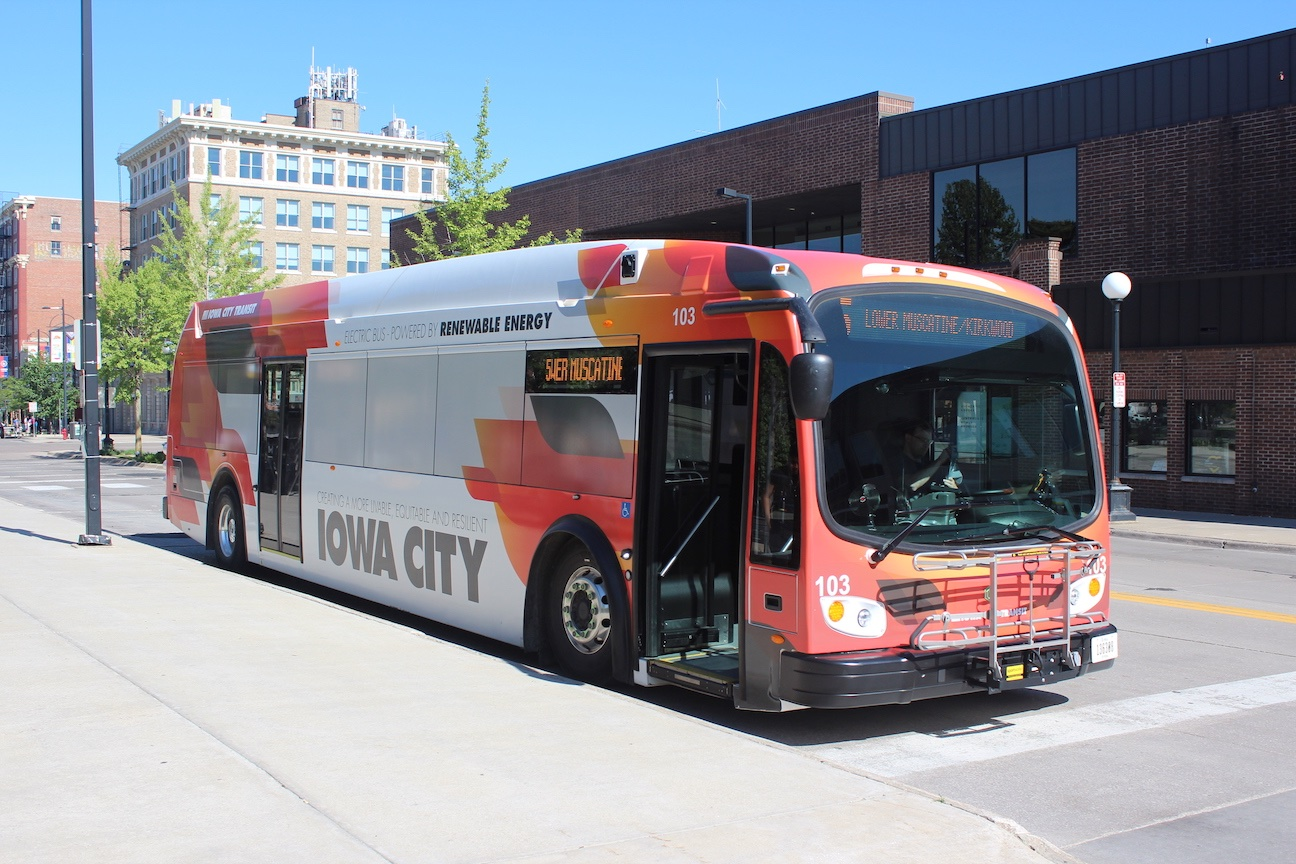
An Iowa City Transit bus

Iowa City Transit, Coralville Transit, and the University of Iowa's Cambus system provide public transportation.

Commuter bus service to Cedar Rapids is provided by the 380 Express. Intercity bus transit is served at either the Court Street Transportation Center in Iowa City or the Coralville Transit Intermodal Facility in Coralville.

=== Cycling ===
There is a system of paved bicycle paths, especially along the Iowa River. Some of the main roads also have designated bike lanes or sharrows, such as Jefferson street, Market street, First avenue, Mccollister Blvd and Dodge street. As of 2017, both Iowa City and the University of Iowa have been awarded 'silver' status as a bicycle friendly community and university, respectively, by the League of American Bicyclists.

The city is also home to the Iowa City Bike Library, a nonprofit bicycle collective that refurbishes donated bicycles and offers public repair education.

== Notable people ==
- Nancy C. Andreasen, psychiatrist and professor at University of Iowa
- George Washington Ball (1847–1915), Iowa state senator
- Janusz Bardach, gulag survivor, author, and plastic surgeon
- Bob Barr, former Georgia congressman
- Brian Bell, guitarist of the alternative rock band Weezer
- Todd Blodgett, member of White House staff (Reagan-Bush) 1985–87
- Moses Bloom, former mayor of Iowa City
- Eleanor Hoyt Brainerd, novelist
- Greg Brown, folk musician
- Abbie Callahan, country singer songwriter
- Ethan Canin, writer
- Thomas R. Cech (born 1947), 1989 Nobel Prize winner in chemistry
- Harry Chase, 19th-century marine painter
- Eli P. Clark, railroad man
- James Claussen, lithographer, abstract painter
- Iris DeMent, musician, lives in Iowa City
- Peter A. Dey, Mayor of Iowa City, civil engineer and banker
- Edward M. Doe, Arizona Territorial jurist, lived in Iowa City
- Tim Dwight, NFL player
- Benjamin Edwards, visual artist
- Albert Erives (born 1972), biologist, provided pacRNA model for evolutionary origin of genetic code
- Kenny Fields, former NBA player, born in Iowa City
- Jim Foster, creator of the Arena Football League
- Dan Gable, Olympic gold medalist wrestler; NCAA champion from Iowa State University
- Janet Guthrie, Indy Car and NASCAR driver, first woman in Indianapolis 500
- Oscar Hahn, author
- Andy Haman, bodybuilding champion
- Mary Eunice Harlan, daughter-in-law of Abraham Lincoln
- Hill Harper, actor
- Jay Hilgenberg, center for the Chicago Bears and broadcaster
- Rob Hogg, Iowa State Senate Minority Leader
- John P. Irish (1843–1923), Iowa and California editor and activist
- Zach Johnson (1976– ), golfer on the PGA Tour
- Nate Kaeding (1982– ), NFL kicker for San Diego Chargers
- Bridget Kearney, musician and songwriter, and founding member of Lake Street Dive
- Carol Kelso, member of the Wisconsin State Assembly
- Seung Min Kim, journalist
- Alex Ko, Broadway actor
- Alan Larson (born 1949), diplomat and ambassador
- Diego Lasansky, visual artist
- Mauricio Lasansky, visual artist
- Tomas Lasansky, visual artist
- Laura Leighton, actress
- Helen Lemme, local activist
- Elinor Levin, member of the Iowa House of Representatives
- Michelle Lilienthal, distance runner
- Janet Lilly, dancer and choreographer
- Jean Hall Lloyd-Jones, state legislator
- Nia Long, actress
- Melissa Ludtke, editor
- Corine Mauch, mayor of Zürich
- Dan McCarney, head football coach for Iowa State Cyclones and others
- James Alan McPherson, writer
- Christopher C. Miller, acting United States Secretary of Defense
- Jim Miller, football player
- Julie Miller, harness racing driver and trainer
- Phil Morris, actor
- Mary Neuhauser, mayor of Iowa City, state legislator, and lawyer
- Stephanie Novacek, operatic mezzo-soprano
- Dan Perkins, aka Tom Tomorrow, political cartoonist
- Joseph M. Petrick, writer and co-director of The Mother of Invention
- Henry Augustus Pilsbry (1862–1957), malacologist and carcinologist
- Jason Reeves, singer-songwriter
- Marilynne Robinson, Pulitzer Prize-winning author of Gilead
- Nate Ruess, lead vocalist of the band Fun
- Paul Schedl (born 1947 in Iowa City) molecular biologist
- Phyllis Somerville, actress
- Russell Stover, candy maker
- David Strackany, folk singer-songwriter aka Paleo
- John T. Struble, pioneer builder, rancher, and farmer
- Elizabeth Tate, civil rights advocate who ran a boarding house for African-American students
- James Van Allen (1914–2006), physicist and astronomer, discoverer of the Van Allen Belts
- Michael Wacha, MLB pitcher
- Zach Wahls, an LGBT activist and state legislator
- Louis J. Wilde, 17th mayor of San Diego (1917–1921)
- Grant Wood, artist and painter of the iconic American Gothic
- Joey Woody, world champion sprinter
- Bart Yates, writer

== See also ==
- Coralville, Iowa
- Iowa City Community School District
- Iowa City Police Department
- Iowa City Public Library
- Iowa City Public Works Facility
- Kirkwood Community College
- Mormon handcart pioneers
- University of Iowa
- University of Iowa Hospitals and Clinics
