= Pegeen (film) =

1920 silent film by David Smith

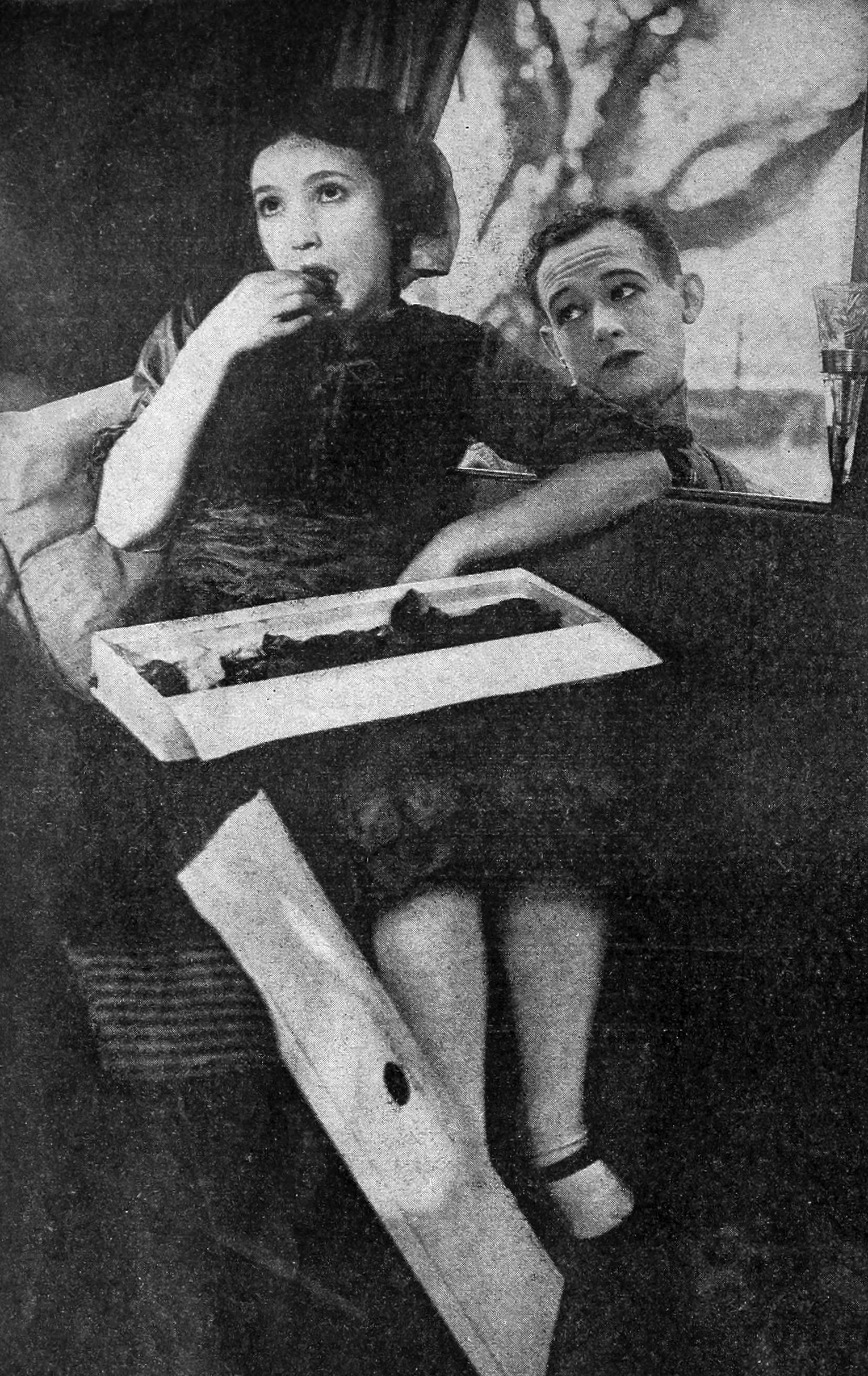
- Still with Bessie Love and Charles Spere
- Directed by: David Smith
- Screenplay by: William B. Laub
- Based on: Pegeen (novel) by Eleanor Hoyt Brainerd
- Starring: Bessie Love
- Cinematography: Charles R. Seeling
- Production company: Vitagraph Studios
- Release date: January 11, 1920 (U.S.)
- Running time: 5 reels
- Country: United States
- Language: Silent (English intertitles)

Pegeen is a 1920 American silent drama film based on the 1915 novel of the same name by Eleanor Hoyt Brainerd. It was produced by Vitagraph Studios and directed by David Smith. It stars Bessie Love in the title role.

== Plot ==
Recently widowed Danny O'Neil has the belief that his wife will return to him by way of fire, and sets fire to buildings around town in hope that she will return to him. For her safety, his daughter Pegeen is sent to live with a neighbor. When her father is to be arrested, Pegeen's friend Ezra helps hide her father, who dies shortly thereafter.

== Cast ==
- Bessie Love as Pegeen O'Neill
- Edmund Burns as John Archibald
- Ruth Fuller Gordon as Nora Moran
- Charles Spere as Jimmie
- Juan de la Cruz as Meredith
- Major McGuire as Ezra
- George Stanley as Dan O'Neill
- Anne Schaefer as Ellen
- Jay Morley as Lem Tollerton

== Reception ==
Reviews for the film were mixed. Its "worst criticism" is that "it is not a thriller, nor a spectacle. Neither is it a heavy digest of a weighty social or economic problem. It is just a simple story of every day people, told in simple, direct continuity, intelligently and coherently."

Scenes involving a hanging and a shoot-out were recommended for removal when showing the film to family audiences.
