= Irving Weber =

American historian

Irving B. Weber (December 19, 1900 – March 16, 1997) was a local athlete, businessman, and historian in Iowa City, Iowa.

He was the first athlete at the University of Iowa to make the All-American Swimming Team.

He joined Sidwell's Ice Cream Company in Iowa City and later became one of its owners. He later organized the firm and four other independent producers of ice cream into the Quality Chek'd Dairy Association.

Beginning in the 1970s, his weekly Saturday newspaper articles in the Iowa City Press-Citizen under the title "Irving Weber's Iowa City" were what led to his greatest renown in the community as a local character. While not considered a literary stylist on a par with Proust or Dickens, his articles regularly informed readers about odd byways of Iowa City history, teaching about both lost and still-extant historic structures and the mores of another age.

The articles were collected in various bound paperback volumes that were sold to benefit the local Iowa City Lions Club.

His name was later memorialized in the Irving B. Weber Elementary School, which opened its doors in 1994.

There is a bronze statue depicting Weber, located on Iowa Avenue in downtown Iowa City. The statue was donated by Steve Maxon and Doris Park in 2003, along with sponsors; Iowa City Host Noon Lions Club, Iowa City Public Art Program, Quality Chekd Dairies, and Friends of Irving Weber.
