= Iowa City Public Works Facility =

- Interactive map of Iowa City Public Works Facility

General information
- Type: Public service facility
- Location: 310 Napoleon Lane, Iowa City, IA 52240, Iowa City, Iowa, United States
- Coordinates: 41°37′48.34″N 91°31′44.07″W
- Completed: 2019
- Cost: $11,300,000
- Owner: City of Iowa City

Technical details
- Floor count: 2
- Floor area: 88,160 sq ft (8,190 m^{2})

Design and construction
- Architecture firm: Neumann Monson Architects
- Structural engineer: Raker Rhodes Engineering
- Civil engineer: Snyder & Associates
- Main contractor: Merit Construction
- Awards and prizes: 2022 AIA COTE Top Ten Award; 2020 AIA Central States Design Award; 2020 AIA Iowa Design Award

The Iowa City Public Works Facility in Iowa City, Iowa, United States opened in 2019. The intent of the building was to replace several sites with a single, consolidated location. The new building has a footprint of roughly 88,000 square feet (8,200 m^{2}) and cost $11.3 million. Enclosed within the facility are the Streets and Water Departments, and their vehicles and equipment. In 2022, the facility received an American Institute of Architects (AIA) Committee on the Environment (COTE) Top Ten award.

== History ==
Iowa City and ICPW had long utilized several buildings which served different departments and equipment. According to special projects administrator Melissa Clow, “the current facilities are in poor condition and are inefficient, spreading the city fleet and staff across the city at multiple locations.” In addition to the logistical problems posed with disjointed locations, the city also observed that many of these locations were outdated and falling behind safety standards. The public works service was due to receive new equipment and significant safety upgrades alongside the new buildings.

A 14-acre (5.7 ha) city-owned parcel was chosen as the site of the new facility. The location neighbors existing public works storage facilities and the Iowa City Streets Division office. In February 2018, the architecture firm Neumann Monson Architects was awarded the design service contract by the Iowa City Council.

One of the main goals of new facility would be to consolidate multiple departments in one centralized location. The plans for the project included an addition to the main fleet maintenance building, remodeling of an existing building on-site for the Iowa City Police and Fire Departments.

== Design ==
The Phase I structure serves three of five public works divisions and their vehicle and equipment needs. The program includes shops, large-scale vehicle/equipment storage, wash bays, and mezzanine storage. Also included are police and fire department storage. By transferring personnel and vehicles to a single structure, CO_{2} emissions are reduced by an estimated 150 tonnes per year. In addition, a stand-alone four-story fire training facility that features a smoke generator, rapelling, burn room, movable wall partitions, roof cut out station were also constructed.

The building's volumetric aspect ratio enables the mechanical system to heat and cool efficiently. The structure's 50-foot (15 m) module anticipates future additions and modifications. This structure was constructed using highly durable, cost-effective materials that are easy to maintain. 29% of the materials were made from recycled content, 87% of all construction waste was diverted from landfills and 29% of the materials were from local manufacturers.

Multiple strategies are applied as a means of reducing operational carbon emissions including properly sized HVAC systems and appropriate zoning, and building automation systems coupled with a finely tuned exterior façade. Precast wall panels were used which incorporate 4 inches of insulation, and windows were selected to be translucent polycarbonate, which have lower U-values and less sunlight glare than standard double pane windows.

All indoor water fixtures are designed to be low flow, and a small vehicle wash bay has a reclamation system to capture grey water and repurpose it for street cleaning and roadside irrigation. Rainwater on the roof is collected at a central location for similar uses. These measures reduce the building's potable water demand by 65%.

The roof of the main structure is also designed to support photovoltaics, however such systems were not included in the initial construction. Council members questioned the decision to omit such systems, with one city council member stating: "I think we're making a huge mistake by not making a serious commitment to a net-zero facility... to put that solar infrastructure on the front end... I don't think we're serious about our climate change program if we're not showing the private sector what the public sector can do.” In 2021, the city approved the installation of a 39 kW solar array that will be installed in 2022 and is expected to offset 10–15% of the facility's energy use.

The project's LEED certification is in progress however it is anticipated that it will receive LEED Gold certification.

== Influence ==
The Public Works structure is a byproduct of the South District development plan, an effort to address residents' desires for the area. To gather information, the city's Public Works team interviewed property owners, businesses, and local organizations. Each public works division was involved in the idea phase, participating in surveys and workshops. Among those interviewed, the main points of contention were the lack of "middle housing," or housing options that are more dense than single-family homes, but less so than urban apartment complexes, as well as the lack of cohesion in the city's public works facilities. The result of this feedback was the 2015 master plan for the South District.

Overall, among employees of the new public works facility, 93% reported that they felt like their health improved, 78% felt safer on the job, and 83% felt that the new facility increased efficiency. Consolidating the previous public works facilities into one reduced employee fuel consumption, which has resulted in over 20 tons of CO_{2} savings per year. The building is also estimated to save $400,000 annually in operating costs

== Awards ==
In 2020, the project received the AIA Central States Region Architecture Design Award Merit and the AIA Iowa Design Award Honor. The jury commented "The simplicity of a shed building was defined by the near perfect proportions and logic of this storage facility...great to see the city/state investing in a building like this. A perfect example of how all buildings deserve great architecture."

In 2022, the project received the AIA COTE Top Ten award in recognition of its ability to address growing civic infrastructure demand while also incorporating sustainable design practices. This building is a rare recipient of an AIA COTE Top Ten award that is not an education building, library, or museum.
