= Plum Grove Historic House =

Historic house in Iowa, United States

- Plum Grove
- U.S. National Register of Historic Places
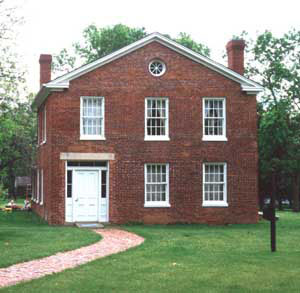
- Plum Grove, Iowa City, 1996

- Location within Iowa Location within the United States
- Interactive map showing the location for Plum Grove
- Location: 1030 Carroll St. Iowa City, Iowa
- Coordinates: 41°38′52″N 91°31′28″W
- Built: 1844
- Architectural style: Greek Revival
- NRHP reference No.: 73000731
- Added to NRHP: May 07, 1973

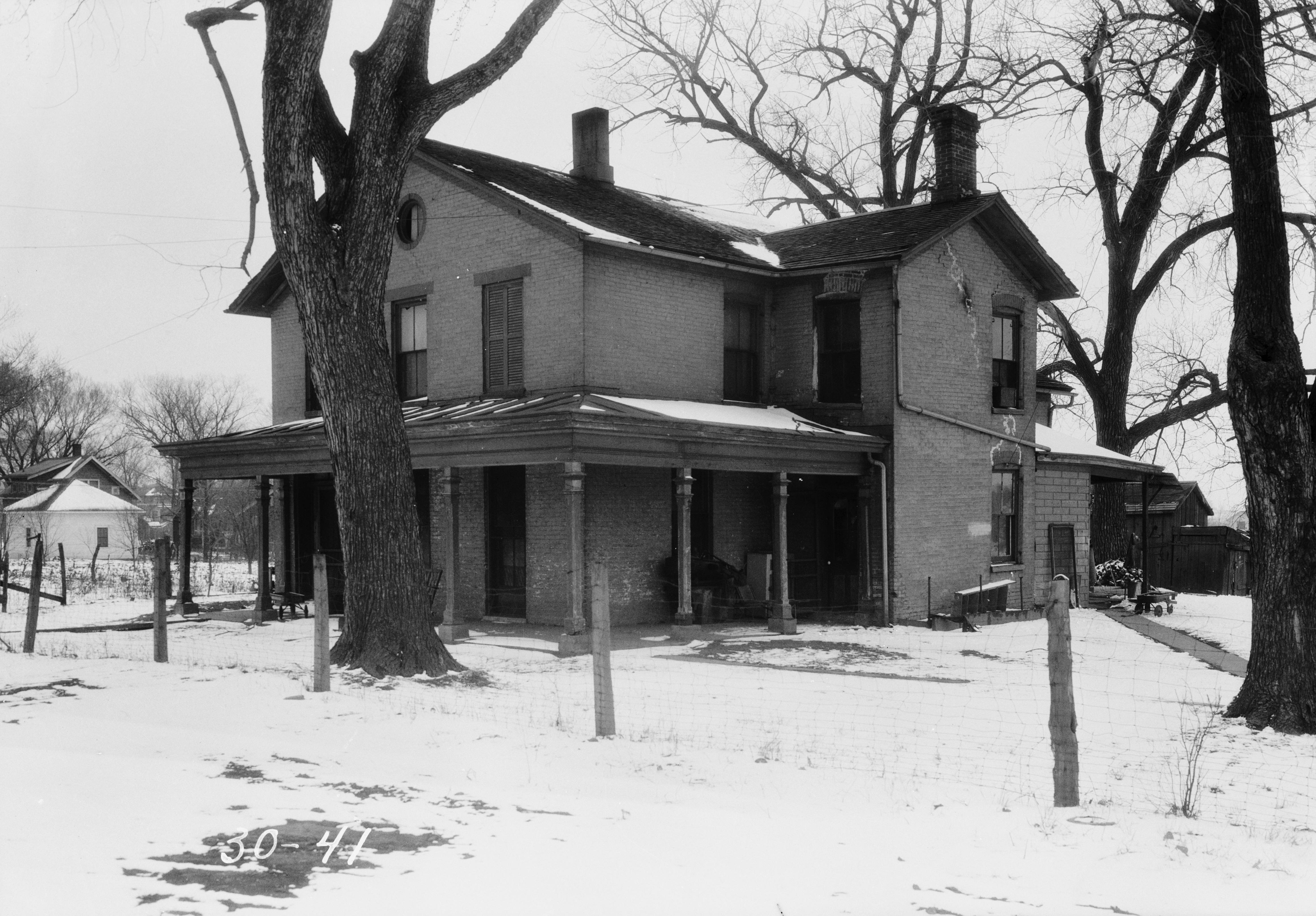
Plum Grove, 1934, prior to restoration.

Plum Grove is a historic house located in Iowa City, United States. Plum Grove was the retirement home of Gov. Robert Lucas and the childhood home of the author Eleanor Hoyt Brainerd.

== History ==
Built in 1844, Robert Lucas lived in the house with his wife, Friendly, and several children and grandchildren. Lucas died at Plum Grove in 1853, and his family moved out by 1866.

Subsequent owners include the Hoyt family, who were associated with the Eleutherian College, and Plum Grove was the birthplace of Eleanor Hoyt Brainerd in 1868. The house was subsequently occupied by the family of Jacob Carroll Switzer, a Civil War hero, and then by a number of immigrant and impoverished families. It was bought by the state of Iowa in 1943 and refurbished as a monument to Lucas.

The house is currently maintained by the Johnson County Historical Society, but owned by the State Historical Society of Iowa. The house is open for tours Memorial Day through Labor Day on Wednesdays through Sundays, 1 p.m. to 5 p.m. Between Labor Day and October 31 it is open Saturday and Sunday, 1 p.m. to 5 p.m. and by group appointment.

== Archaeology ==
The grounds have been the focus of archaeological research since 1974, documenting Iowa frontier history and changes in farming from 1844 until 1943. Most of this work was led by the late Dr. Thomas Charlton who was with the University of Iowa's Department of Anthropology. Previous excavations have uncovered house additions, outbuildings, and a large trench full of butchered animal bones.
