= Iowa City Public Library =

Library

Coordinates: 41.6593°N 91.5323°W

The Iowa City Public Library (ICPL) was established in 1896 to serve the people of Iowa City, Iowa, United States. Currently located in a new facility at the intersection of college and Linn Streets on the downtown pedestrian mall, ICPL serves a population of 69,000 residents of Iowa City, and through contract, residents of unincorporated Johnson County, University Heights and Hills. ICPL has approximately 67,000 cardholders.

== History ==
The idea to establish a library, to provide a room for reading and games for the local young people, came about in 1896, when Iowa City had already existed for fifty-seven years. At this time, there were approximately 7,500 residents and 1300 students attending the University of Iowa. When the library first opened its doors on January 21, 1897, it contained 1,300 books and twenty magazines and newspapers. It was located at 211 Iowa Avenue, and took up two rooms above a steam laundry.

Over the years, the library moved or modified its location five times: in 1901, to 212 East College Street; in 1904, to a Carnegie library at 212 South Linn Street; in 1963, when an addition was added to the Carnegie library; and in 1981, to 123 South Linn Street. On June 12, 2004, the library opened the doors of its new facility, built at the same location but nearly double the size of the previous building. The new library was designed by Engberg Anderson Design Partnership, located in Milwaukee, Wisconsin, and built by Knutson Construction. It covers 81,276 square feet (7,550.8 m^{2}) on two floors in a building that also contains rental space.

== Collections, services and staff ==
ICPL maintains a popular collection that spans the entire range of the Dewey Decimal Classification system. The library holds roughly 175,000 circulating print books, 36,000 non-print items, 6,700 reference materials (print and electronic) and 520 newspapers and periodicals. Fiction and nonfiction items are held in many formats besides print, including downloadable eBooks, eAudiobooks, CD and DVD. Popular areas of the collection include children's items, new fiction and mysteries, the movie and TV collection, video games, biographical materials, the Art-to-Go prints, and gardening, cooking and travel books and videos.

In addition to the items in the collection, the library offers many other services to its patrons: various types of audiovisual equipment can be checked out, there are five meeting rooms that can be booked by the public, study space for young adults and general-use study rooms, a large children's room with computers and story time area, forty-two internet/database computers, free wireless Internet throughout the building, Channel 20 (ICPL's local public-access television cable TV channel that shows recorded programming), and a wide variety of programming for adults and children. Outside of the library's downtown location, it provides and maintains eighteen outreach collections at various community, youth and senior centers in the area.

Iowa City Public Library offers times for Accessible Browsing. During this special services hour, accommodations are made for patrons with Autism and anyone who would benefit from a calmer environment. Overhead fluorescent lights are turned off during this time and therapy animals are brought in for support.

In 2009, the Library reached a milestone of 1,500,000 circulations, making it the busiest public library in Iowa.

ICPL employs over 100 full, part-time and hourly workers, and has over 430 volunteers that perform a wide variety of tasks. It is governed by a nine-member Board of Trustees which is appointed by the Iowa City City Council. The Interim Director is Anne Mangano. It has a digital library.
