= Rudbeckia auriculata =

Scientific classification
- Kingdom: Plantae
- Clade: Tracheophytes
- Clade: Angiosperms
- Clade: Eudicots
- Clade: Asterids
- Order: Asterales
- Family: Asteraceae
- Tribe: Heliantheae
- Genus: Rudbeckia
- Species: R. auriculata

Binomial name
- Rudbeckia auriculata (Perdue) Kral. 1975

Plant species

Rudbeckia auriculata (Perdue) Kral., commonly known as the eared coneflower, is a species of flowering plant in the Asteraceae Bercht. & J.Presl., native to acid bogs in the southeast United States.

== Etymology ==
The specific epithet ‘auriculata’ (meaning with ears), refers to the lobed clasping attachment of the upper leaves to the stem. The species was described by Robert Edward Perdue.

== Taxonomy ==
Previously R. auriculata has been treated as a variety of R. fulgida Aiton. However, in 1957 it was noted that it varied considerably from R. fulgida var. fulgida, such that treating it as a variety would conflict with species concepts within Rudbeckia, consequently in 1975 'R. fulgida var. auriculata' gained species status becoming R. auriculata. This revision revealed the species' close relationship to other Rudbeckia spp. including R. nitida and R. mohrii, species which along with R. auriculata are now placed in the informal subgenus macrocline. R. auriculata is commonly misidentified as R. scabrifolia L.E.Br. and sequencing of the Internal transcribed spacer region as well as the generation of spontaneous garden hybrids between these species suggests a recent divergence.

== Morphology ==
Rudbeckia auriculata is conspicuous in the wild due to its extreme height (occasionally over 3 m (9.8 ft)) as long as the morphological differences with Rudbeckia laciniata L. such as its dissected leaves are noted. R. auriculata is a long-lived perennial. The lower leaf blades are up to 65 cm (26 in) long and attached to the stem by a petiole, they are arranged alternately along the stem. Progressing up the stem the leaves decrease in size and the petioles are lost, the attachment of the leaves to the stem becoming auriculate. The flowers are arranged in a panicle containing a dozen bright yellow ray flowers. If fertilized, purple-brown achenes 4–5 mm (0.16–0.20 in) long form. R. auriculata is classified within the section macroline. In contrast with the more typical macroline, R. auriculata has smaller seeds as well as having the species defining character ‘clasping leaves’.

== Growth and reproduction ==
Studies show R. auriculata is pollinated by the mining bee Andrena aliciae where plants exist in large numbers. In contrast, when populations are small the most numerous pollinators are bees in the family Halictidae. A species of pollen mimic fungus Fusarium semitectum capitalises on the plant pollinator relationship, its spores are morphologically similar to Rudbeckia pollen and are transported between flowers by A. aliciae. The fungus sporulates on the disk flowers for effective dispersal. Artificial pollination experiments reveal that the plant is xenogamous as few fertile seeds are produced from self-pollination. If pollinated the achenes mature and once seed is ripe the seedheads slowly break apart releasing seeds close to the plant. Once dispersed, seeds require cold stratification in order to germinate once temperatures rise and the photoperiod lengthens. To germinate, these seeds require bare soil such as would be produced after herbaceous plants and shrubs are cleared by fire or when buried soils are uplifted by scouring stream scouring. Because these events are infrequent and fires are often suppressed by humans seedlings are rarely recorded in the wild. Despite its ineffective seed dispersal, this species can spread through clonal reproduction. Resultantly, often the entire population consists of a single genet.

== Distribution and habitat ==
Rudbeckia auriculata is endemic to the USA especially the southeast. Most recorded populations occur in Alabama with one population in Georgia. The Florida population was presumed extinct until a population was discovered in 2026. The distribution and population of this species is reducing with the majority of sites producing fewer than 50 flowering stems annually. R. auriculata along with the closely related R. scabrifolia and R. morhii occupy habitats such as peat bogs and can be found in disturbed areas such as alongside roads and within grazed fields. Healthy beaver populations support R. auricuata by engineering rivers to slow waterflow and create bogs. R. auriuclata is found in similar habitats to R. scabrifolia and Sarracenia spp. Tourn. ex L.

== Conservation ==
Several factors limit the population size of R. auriculata, these include poor seed set due to fungal pathogens, low dispersal capacity, and low rates of germination. As a result of several population/distribution surveys this species has been added to the Endangered Species Act.

== Cultivation ==
This species is little known in cultivation as it is difficult to grow within a typical mixed or herbaceous border unless provided with boggy soil. R. auriculata is occasionally available from specialist nurseries but is typically only used in prairie restorations or within botanic gardens. One major drawback is R. auriculatas propensity to lodge, this is most severe when grown in rich soils that differ from the low nutrient peaty soils the species is adapted to
