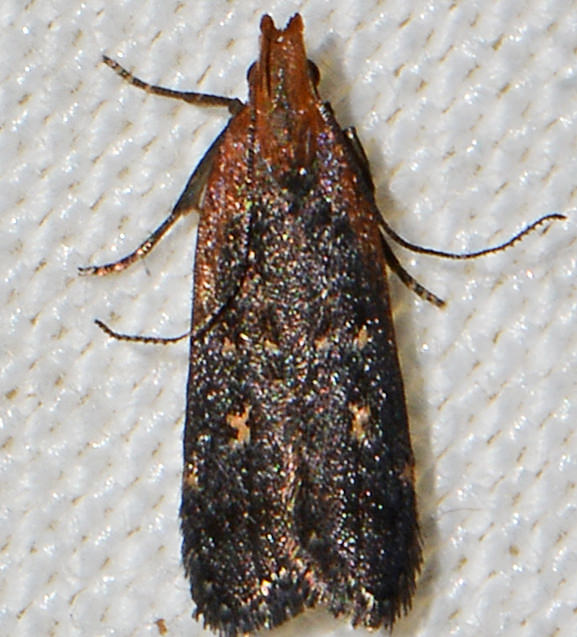

Scientific classification
- Kingdom: Animalia
- Phylum: Arthropoda
- Clade: Pancrustacea
- Class: Insecta
- Order: Lepidoptera
- Family: Gelechiidae
- Genus: Dichomeris
- Species: D. costarufoella

Binomial name
- Dichomeris costarufoella (Chambers, 1874)

Synonyms
- Gelechia costa-rufoella Chambers, 1874; Trichotaphe costirufella Meyrick, 1925

= Dichomeris costarufoella =

Species of moth

Dichomeris costarufoella is a moth in the family Gelechiidae. It was described by Vactor Tousey Chambers in 1874. It is found in North America, where it has been recorded from Illinois and Louisiana to Nebraska, Oklahoma, Texas, New Mexico, Arkansas and Manitoba.

The wingspan is about 12 mm. The forewings are dark gray to black with a yellowish-brown basal patch that extends about halfway along the costa as a tapering streak. There are several small pale spots in the median area and a larger irregular-shaped spot in the postmedial area. The subterminal line is blackish, diffuse and inconspicuous. The hindwings are whitish or pale gray. Adults are on wing from April to October.

The larvae feed on Rudbeckia species.
