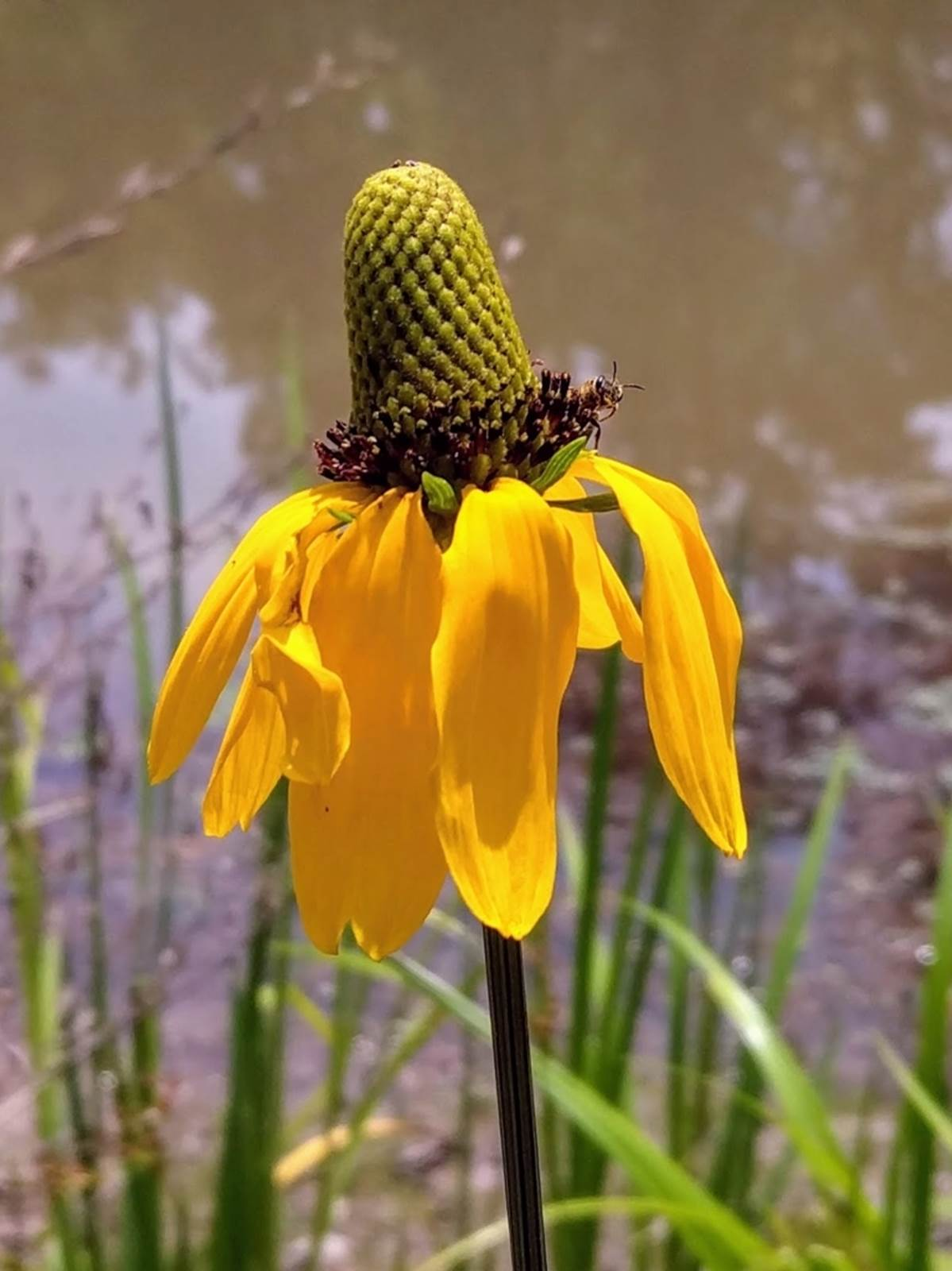

Scientific classification
- Kingdom: Plantae
- Clade: Tracheophytes
- Clade: Angiosperms
- Clade: Eudicots
- Clade: Asterids
- Order: Asterales
- Family: Asteraceae
- Genus: Rudbeckia
- Species: R. texana

Binomial name
- Rudbeckia texana (Perdue) Cox and Urbatsch

= Rudbeckia texana =

Species of flowering plant

Rudbeckia texana, commonly known at Texas coneflower or shiny coneflower, is a perennial plant in the family Asteraceae native to the Western Gulf coastal grasslands of Texas and Louisiana.

== Description ==
Rudbeckia texana is a robust perennial growing up to 150 cm (59 in) tall by 30 cm (12 in) wide. It has alternate, mostly basal leaves 9–20 cm long. The leaves have a leathery texture and are elliptic in shape. Flowering stems appear in the spring, each stem terminating with between 1 and 4 composite flower heads. Flowers have a conical shape and are about 2.0–4.5 cm tall, 1–1.5 cm wide with yellow ray florets circling a conspicuous dark brown dome-shaped cone of many small disc florets.

== Taxonomy ==
Because of its morphological differences from Rudbeckia nitida, R. texana was elevated from varietal to species level in 1989.

== Distribution and habitat ==
Rudbeckia texana can be found in western Louisiana and eastern Texas, primarily in remnant wet prairies and along railroads and highways.

== Ecology ==
Like other members of the genus Rudbeckia, R. texana is likely an important source of pollen for native bees, especially Adrena rudbeckiae. Rudbeckia texana blooms between May and November.

== Conservation ==
The Texas coneflower is sensitive to overgrazing, plowing, and other forms of degradation. It is easily grown from seeds collected in the fall and seeds germinate in 1–2 weeks with no treatment.
