= Coneflower =

Coneflower is a common name of several genera of flowering plants:

In the family Asteraceae

- Dracopis
- Echinacea
- Rudbeckia
- Ratibida

In the family Proteaceae

- Isopogon

== See also ==
- Cornflower
