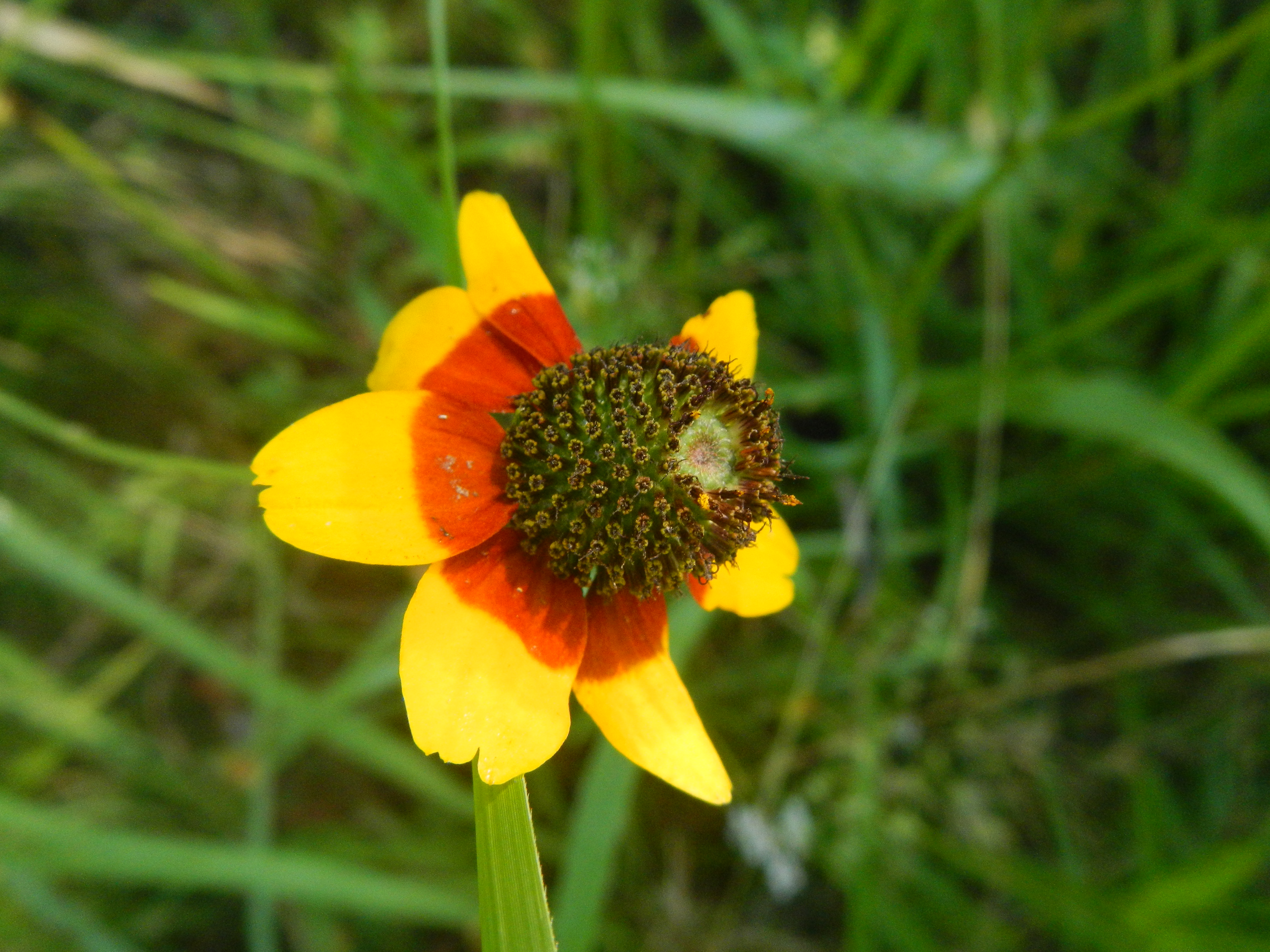

Scientific classification
- Kingdom: Plantae
- Clade: Tracheophytes
- Clade: Angiosperms
- Clade: Eudicots
- Clade: Asterids
- Order: Asterales
- Family: Asteraceae
- Tribe: Heliantheae
- Genus: Dracopis; Cass.
- Species: D. amplexicaulis

Binomial name
- Dracopis amplexicaulis (Vahl) Cass.

= Dracopis =

Clasping coneflower

Genus of flowering plants

Dracopis is a monotypic genus with Dracopis amplexicaulis (clasping coneflower; syn. Rudbeckia amplexicaulis) the sole species. It is native to North America.

It is an annual plant growing to 1 m tall, with simple or branched stems. The leaves are oval, 5–10 cm (2.0–3.9 in) long and 2–4 cm (0.79–1.57 in) broad. The flowers are produced in daisy-like inflorescences, with yellow to yellowish-purple florets. It is distinguished from the genus Rudbeckia (in which it used to be treated) by the presence of chaff subtending the ray flowers.

It is one of at least four genera in the flowering plant family Asteraceae whose members are commonly known as coneflowers; the others being Echinacea, Rudbeckia and Ratibida.

In cultivation in the UK this plant has gained the Royal Horticultural Society's Award of Garden Merit.
