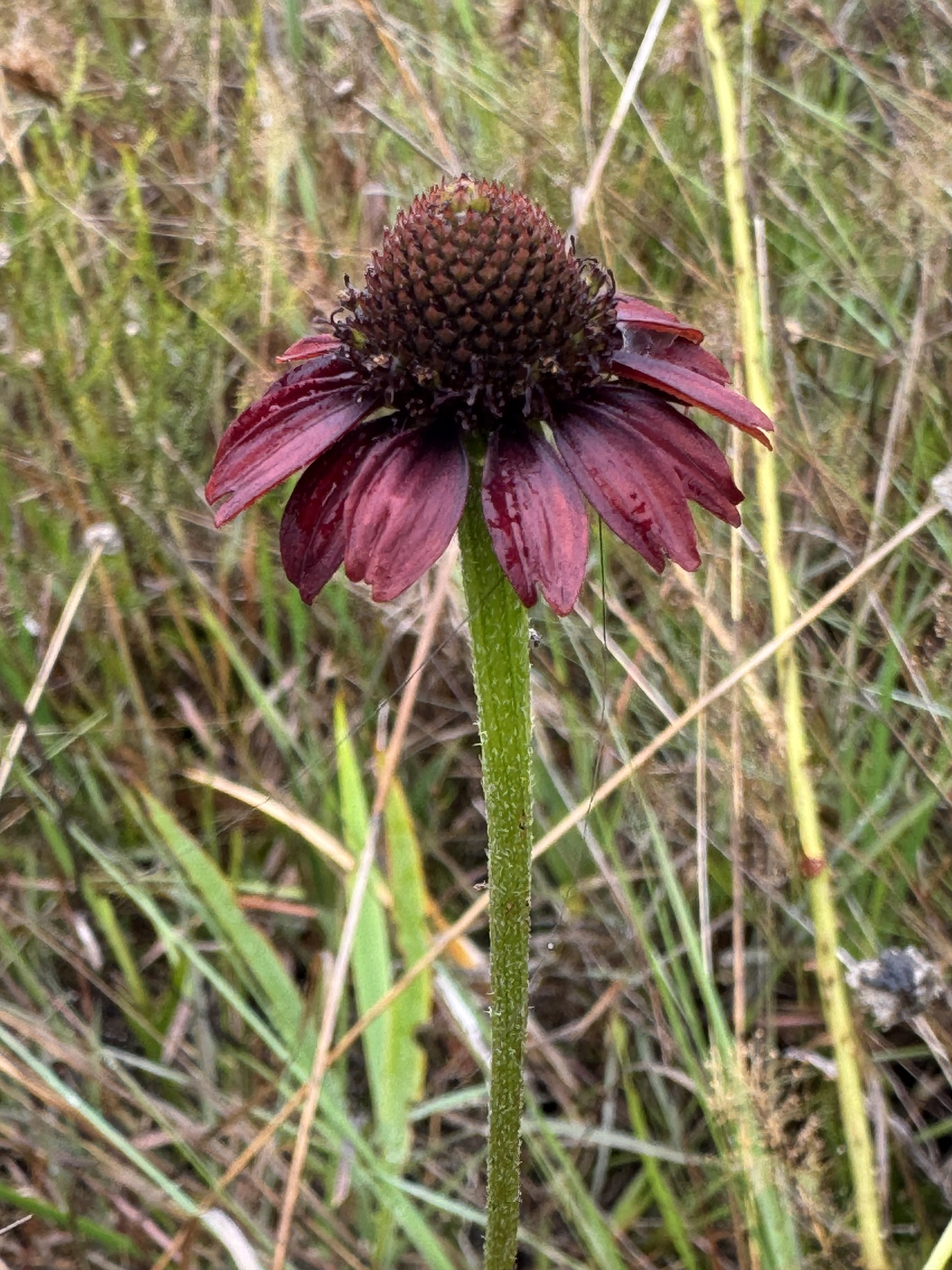

Scientific classification
- Kingdom: Plantae
- Clade: Tracheophytes
- Clade: Angiosperms
- Clade: Eudicots
- Clade: Asterids
- Order: Asterales
- Family: Asteraceae
- Tribe: Heliantheae
- Genus: Rudbeckia
- Species: R. graminifolia

Binomial name
- Rudbeckia graminifolia (Torr. & A. Gray) C.L. Boynt. & Beadle

= Rudbeckia graminifolia =

Species of flowering plant

Rudbeckia graminifolia, the grassleaf coneflower, is a species of flowering plant. It grows in parts of the Florida Panhandle. It produces tubular disc flowers, which go on to form seeds and ray flowers. The flowering plants have been spotted in wet roadside ditches.
