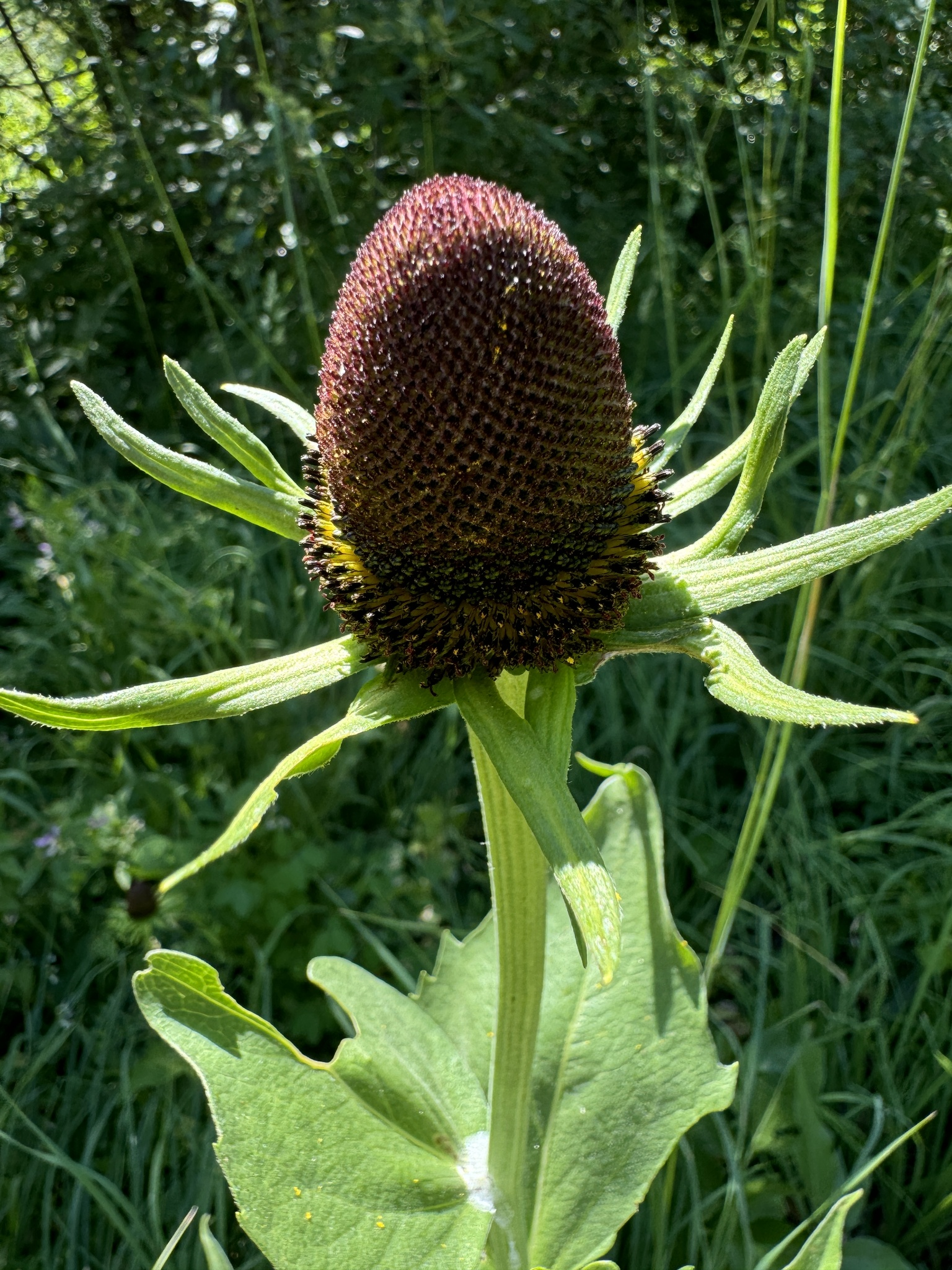

Scientific classification
- Kingdom: Plantae
- Clade: Tracheophytes
- Clade: Angiosperms
- Clade: Eudicots
- Clade: Asterids
- Order: Asterales
- Family: Asteraceae
- Tribe: Heliantheae
- Genus: Rudbeckia
- Species: R. alpicola

Binomial name
- Rudbeckia alpicola Piper

= Rudbeckia alpicola =

Species of flowering plant

Rudbeckia alpicola, the showy coneflower, Washington coneflower, or Wenatchee mountain coneflower. It is a perennial flowering plant native to Washington state in the United States.
