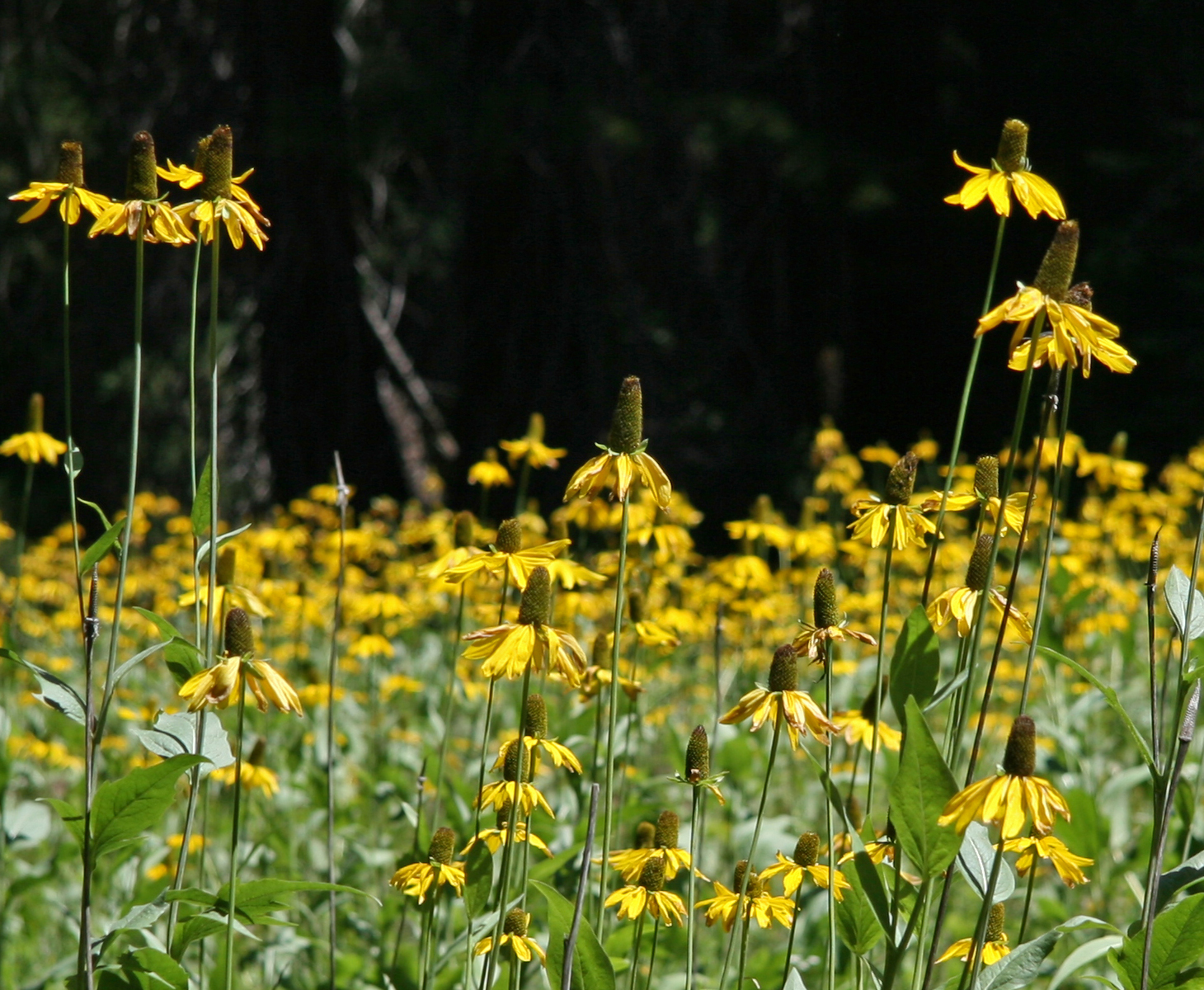
- Meadow of Rudbeckia californica flowers

Scientific classification
- Kingdom: Plantae
- Clade: Tracheophytes
- Clade: Angiosperms
- Clade: Eudicots
- Clade: Asterids
- Order: Asterales
- Family: Asteraceae
- Tribe: Heliantheae
- Genus: Rudbeckia
- Species: R. californica

Binomial name
- Rudbeckia californica A.Gray

= Rudbeckia californica =

Species of flowering plant

Rudbeckia californica is a species of flowering plant in the family Asteraceae, known by the common name California coneflower.

== Habitat and range ==
It is native to California, where it grows in the Sierra Nevada (U.S.). It occurs in moist habitats, such as mountain meadows and streambanks.

== Growth pattern ==
It is an erect perennial herb growing from a thick rhizome, its stem exceeding one meter in maximum height and sometimes approaching two meters. It usually has no branches.

== Leaves ==
Most of the large leaves are basal, with a few alternately arranged along the stem. The leaves can be up to 30 centimeters long and are lance-shaped to oval, smooth-edged or lobed.

== Inflorescence and fruit ==
The inflorescence is a usually solitary sunflower-like flower head with a base up to 6 centimeters wide lined with several ray florets, each of which are 2 to 6 centimeters long. The yellow ray florets extend outwards and then become reflexed, pointing back along the stem. The disc florets filling the button-shaped to conical to cylindrical center of the head are greenish yellow.

The fruits are achenes each about half a centimeter long tipped with a pappus of scales.

== Comments ==
One variety of this species, var. intermedia, is now generally treated as a species in its own right named Rudbeckia klamathensis, the Klamath coneflower. Another variety, var. glauca, is now treated as a species Rudbeckia glaucescens, waxy coneflower, by the same references.
