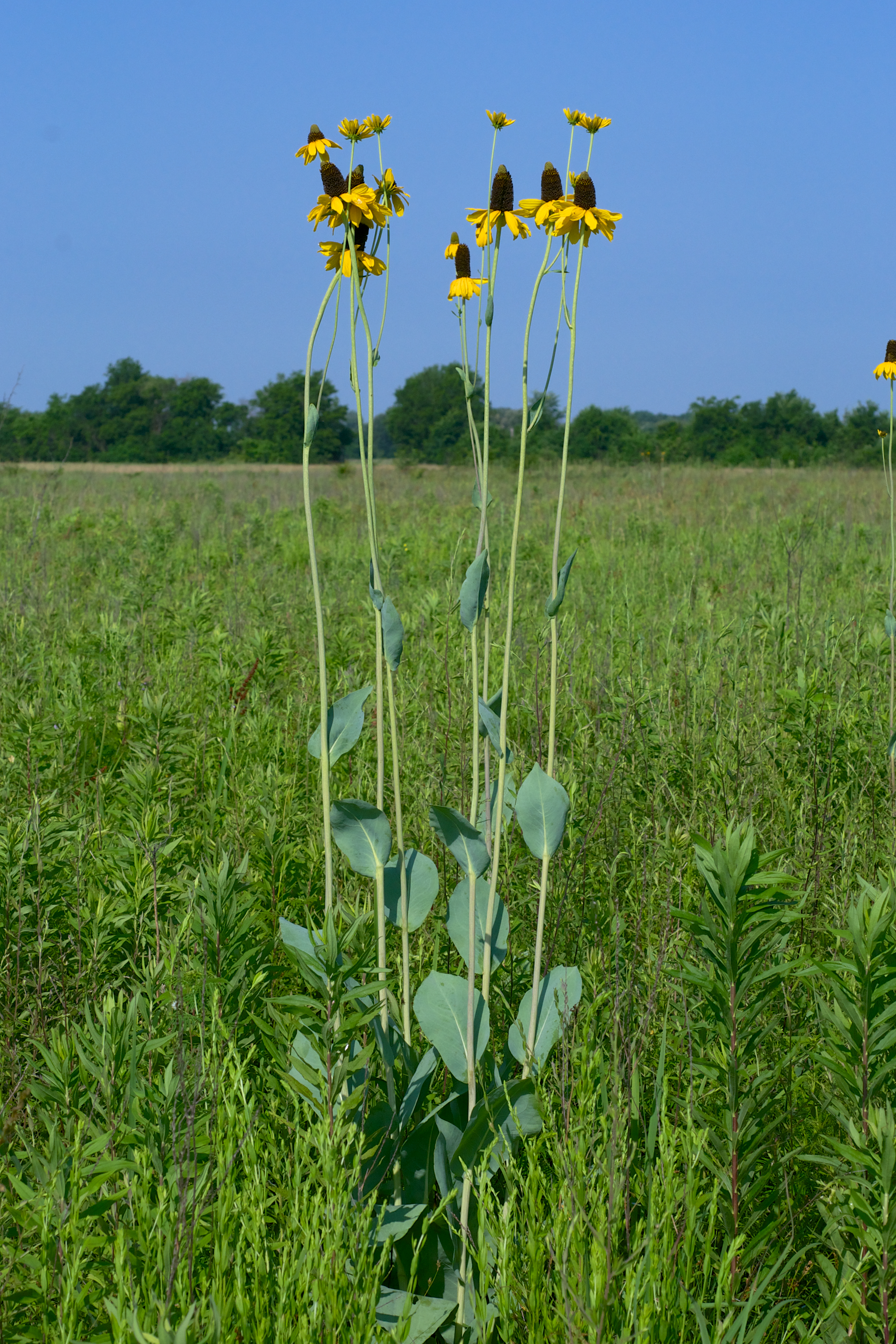
- Wild population at a blackland prairie preserve in southwest Arkansas

Scientific classification
- Kingdom: Plantae
- Clade: Tracheophytes
- Clade: Angiosperms
- Clade: Eudicots
- Clade: Asterids
- Order: Asterales
- Family: Asteraceae
- Tribe: Heliantheae
- Genus: Rudbeckia
- Species: R. maxima

Binomial name
- Rudbeckia maxima Nutt.

= Rudbeckia maxima =

Species of flowering plant

Rudbeckia maxima, the great coneflower, is a flowering plant in the family Asteraceae, which is used as an ornamental plant. They can reach a maximum height of eight feet. Once it produces seeds, finches and other small birds come to feed on them.

Rudbeckia maxima
