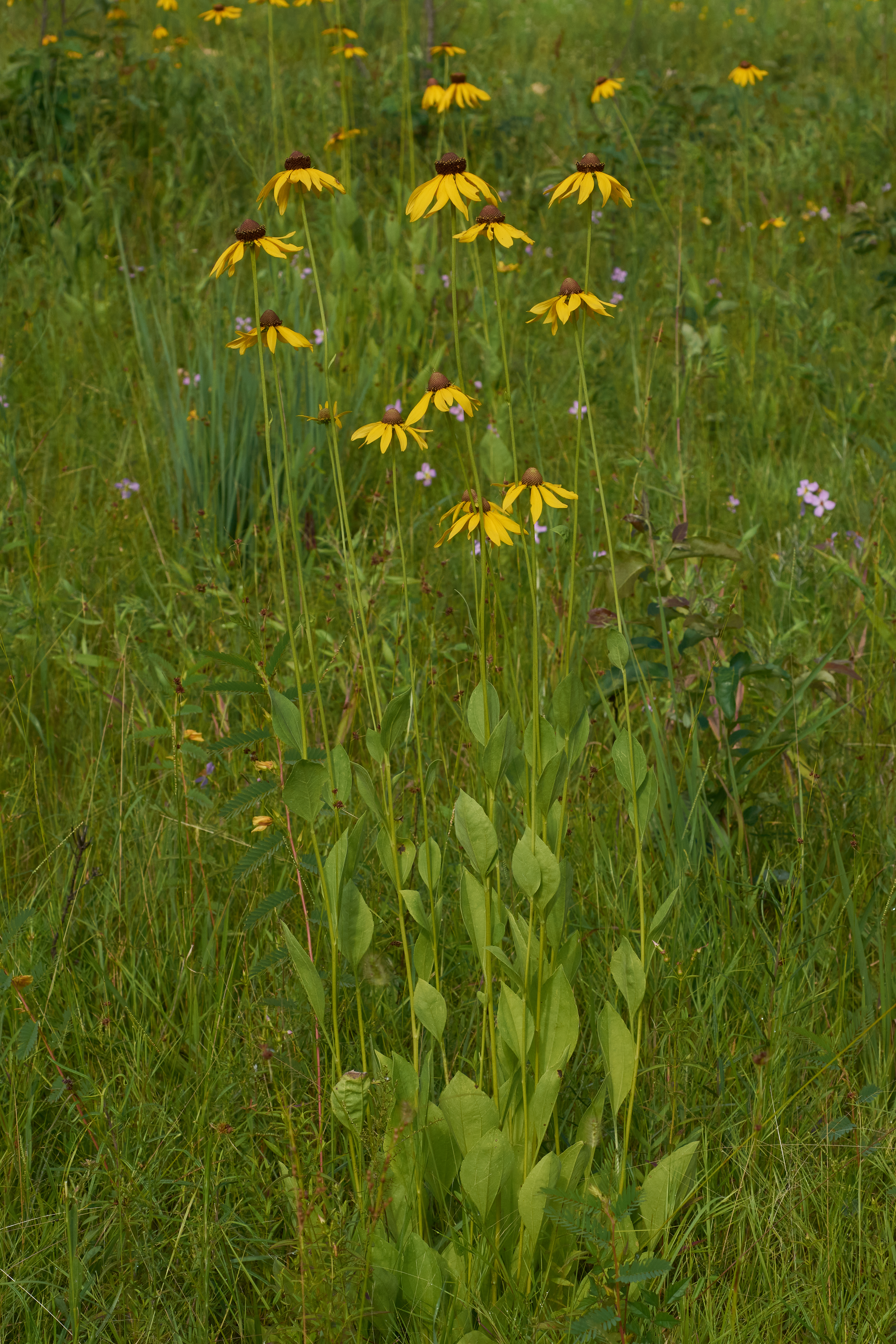

Scientific classification
- Kingdom: Plantae
- Clade: Tracheophytes
- Clade: Angiosperms
- Clade: Eudicots
- Clade: Asterids
- Order: Asterales
- Family: Asteraceae
- Genus: Rudbeckia
- Species: R. grandiflora

Binomial name
- Rudbeckia grandiflora (D. Don) J.F. Gmel. ex DC., 1836

= Rudbeckia grandiflora =

Species of flowering plant

Rudbeckia grandiflora, commonly called rough coneflower, is a species of flowering plant in the family Asteraceae.

== Description ==
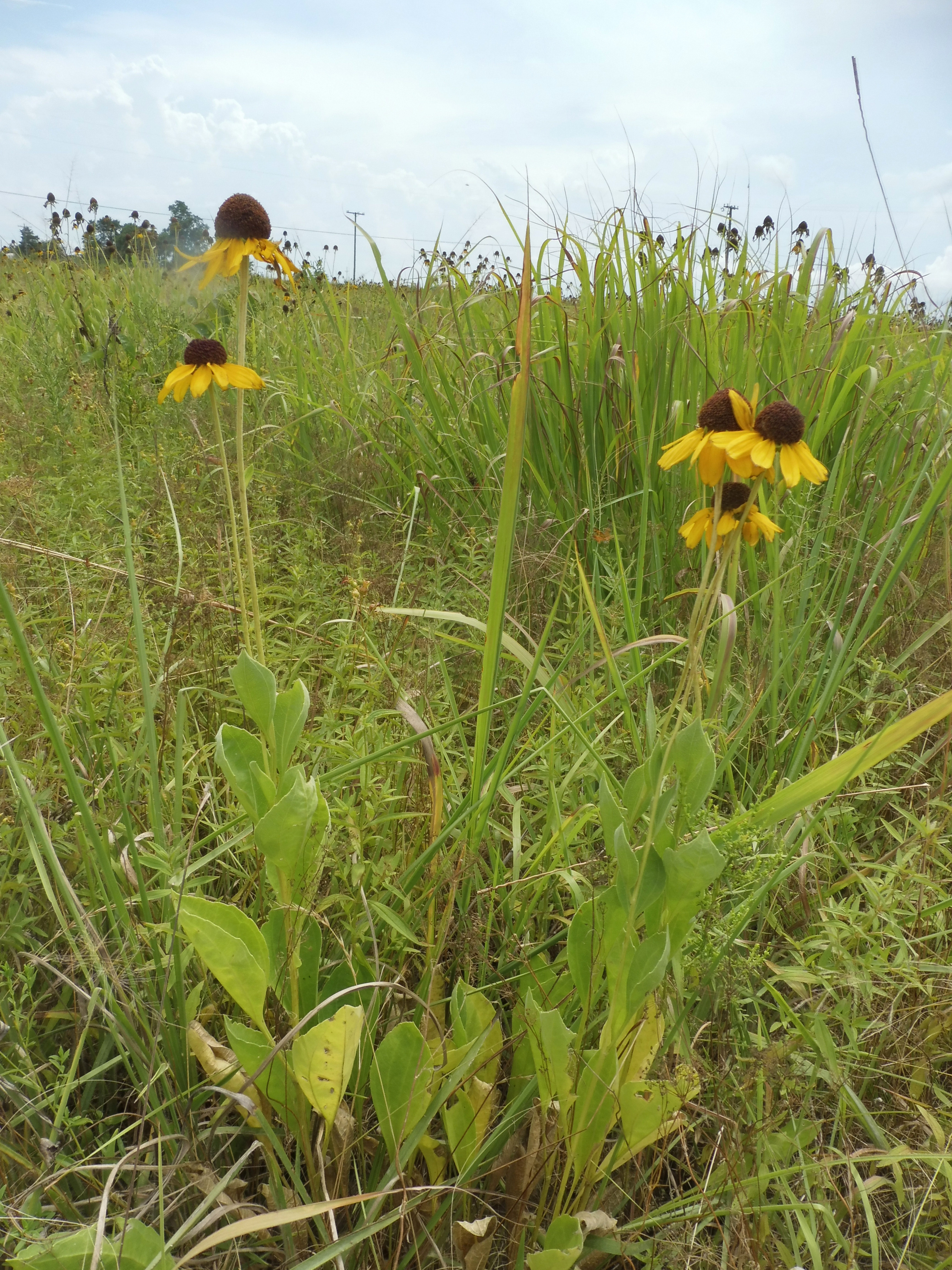
Growing wild in Arkansas

It is a perennial from a woody base, growing to around 120 cm tall. It produces relatively large inflorescences, with 12-25 yellow ray flowers, each around 3–5 cm long. It blooms from late spring into summer.

== Distribution ==
It is native to North America, where it is found primarily in the south-central United States, including a disjunct population in northwest Georgia. The other populations further east, all small and isolated, are believed to have originated from human introductions.

Its typical natural habitat is in prairies and open woodlands.

== Taxonomy ==
Two varieties are recognized:

- Rudbeckia grandiflora var. alismifolia - Stems glabrous or sparsely pubescent, with hairs ascending a less than 0.5 mm
- Rudbeckia grandiflora var. grandiflora - Stems with regular spreading hairs over 1 mm
