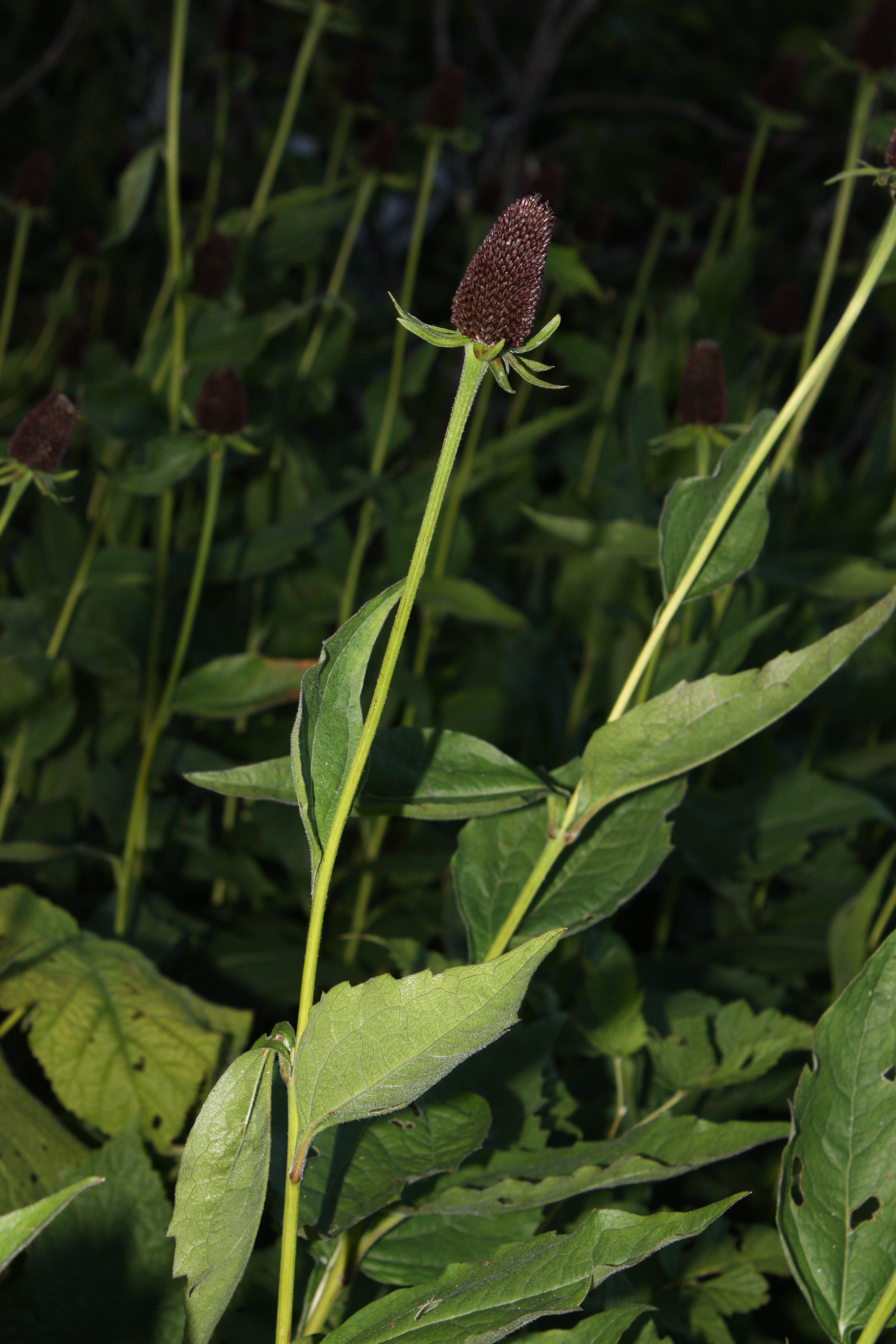
- Rudbeckia occidentalis in Saddle Mountain State Natural Area,

Scientific classification
- Kingdom: Plantae
- Clade: Embryophytes
- Clade: Tracheophytes
- Clade: Spermatophytes
- Clade: Angiosperms
- Clade: Eudicots
- Clade: Asterids
- Order: Asterales
- Family: Asteraceae
- Tribe: Heliantheae
- Genus: Rudbeckia
- Species: R. occidentalis

Binomial name
- Rudbeckia occidentalis Nutt.

= Rudbeckia occidentalis =

Species of flowering plant

Rudbeckia occidentalis is a species of flowering plant in the family Asteraceae known by the common name western coneflower. It is native to the northwestern United States from Washington to northern California and east to Wyoming and Montana, where it grows in moist habitat types, such as meadows. It is an erect perennial herb growing from a thick rhizome, its mostly unbranched stem approaching two meters in maximum height. The large leaves are generally oval but pointed, and lightly to deeply toothed along the edges, growing to 30 centimeters long. The inflorescence is one or more flower heads with purplish bases up to 6 centimeters wide. There are no ray florets, just an array of reflexed phyllaries around the purple-brown center packed with disc florets. This center, containing the receptacles, lengthens to several centimeters in length as the fruits develop. The fruits are achenes each a few millimeters long, some tipped with pappi of tiny scales.

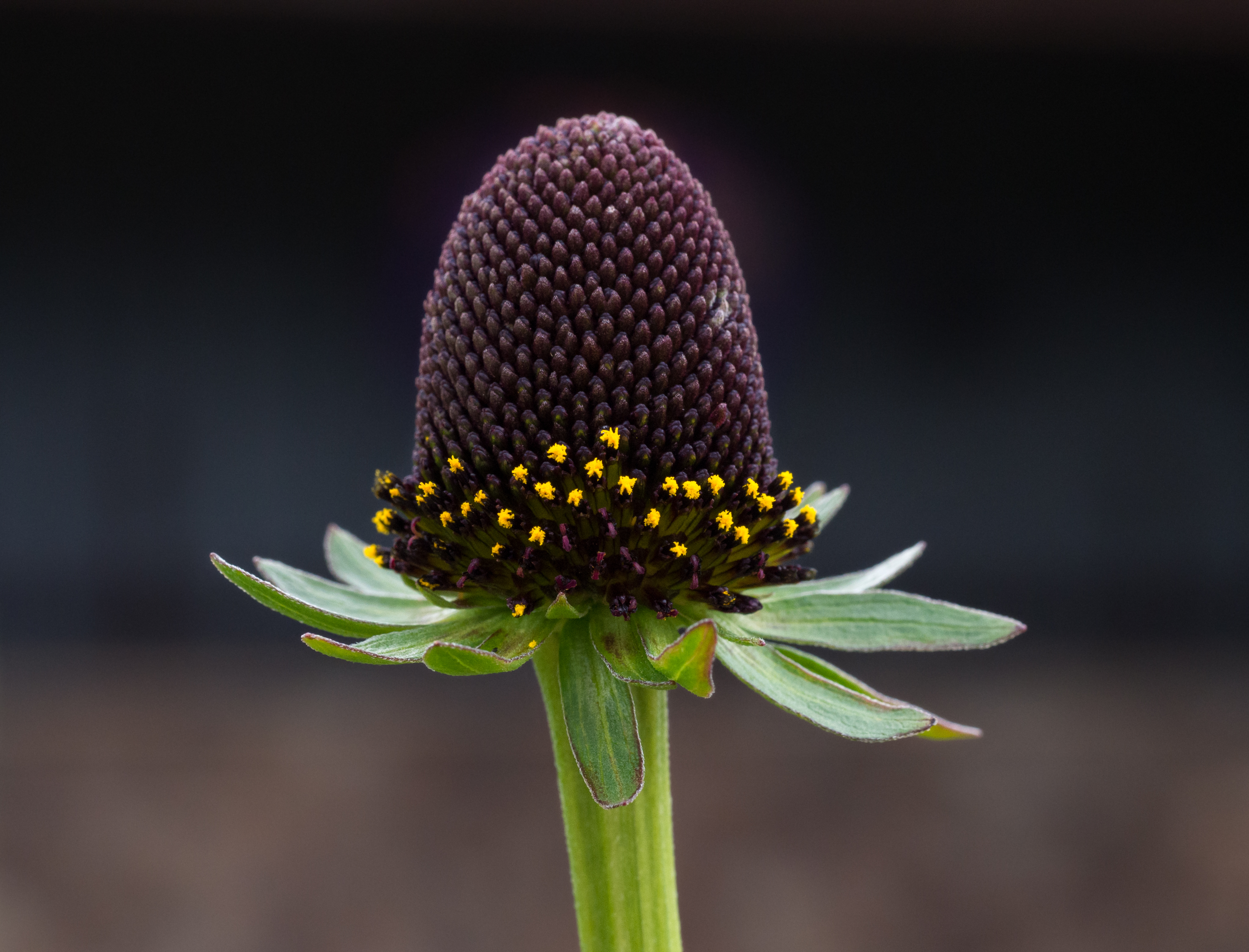
Rudbeckia occidentalis in Aspen, Colorado
