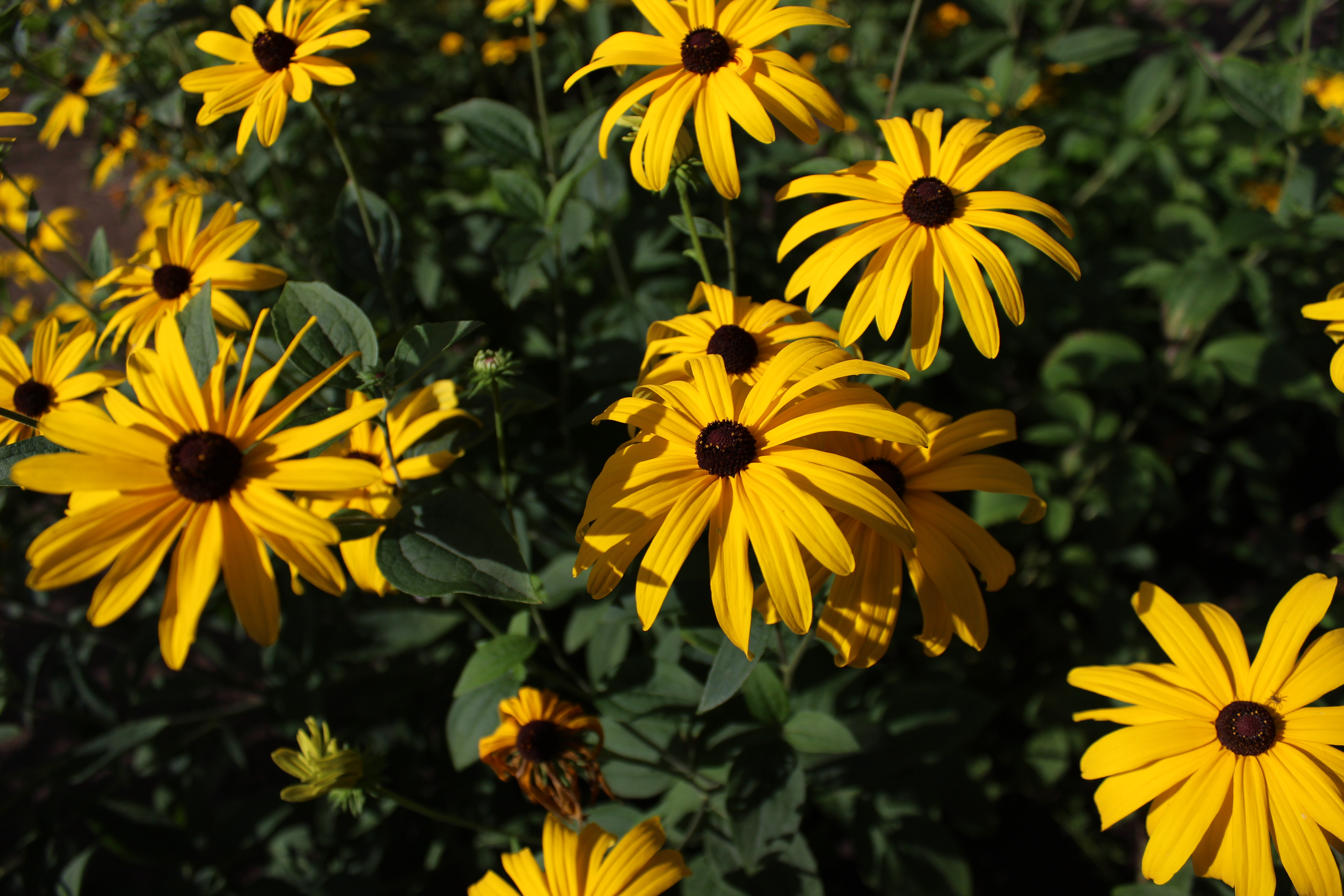

Scientific classification
- Kingdom: Plantae
- Clade: Tracheophytes
- Clade: Angiosperms
- Clade: Eudicots
- Clade: Asterids
- Order: Asterales
- Family: Asteraceae
- Tribe: Heliantheae
- Genus: Rudbeckia
- Species: R. subtomentosa

Binomial name
- Rudbeckia subtomentosa Pursh.

= Rudbeckia subtomentosa =

Species of flowering plant

Rudbeckia subtomentosa, the sweet coneflower, is a flowering plant in the family Asteraceae and is found in the central United States.

Growing to 1.5 m (4.9 ft) tall, it is an erect herbaceous perennial that produces brown centered, yellow daisy-like flowers from late summer to fall. It flowers best in a sheltered position with full sun.

In cultivation in the UK, the cultivar 'Loofahsa Wheaten Gold' has received the Royal Horticultural Society's Award of Garden Merit.
