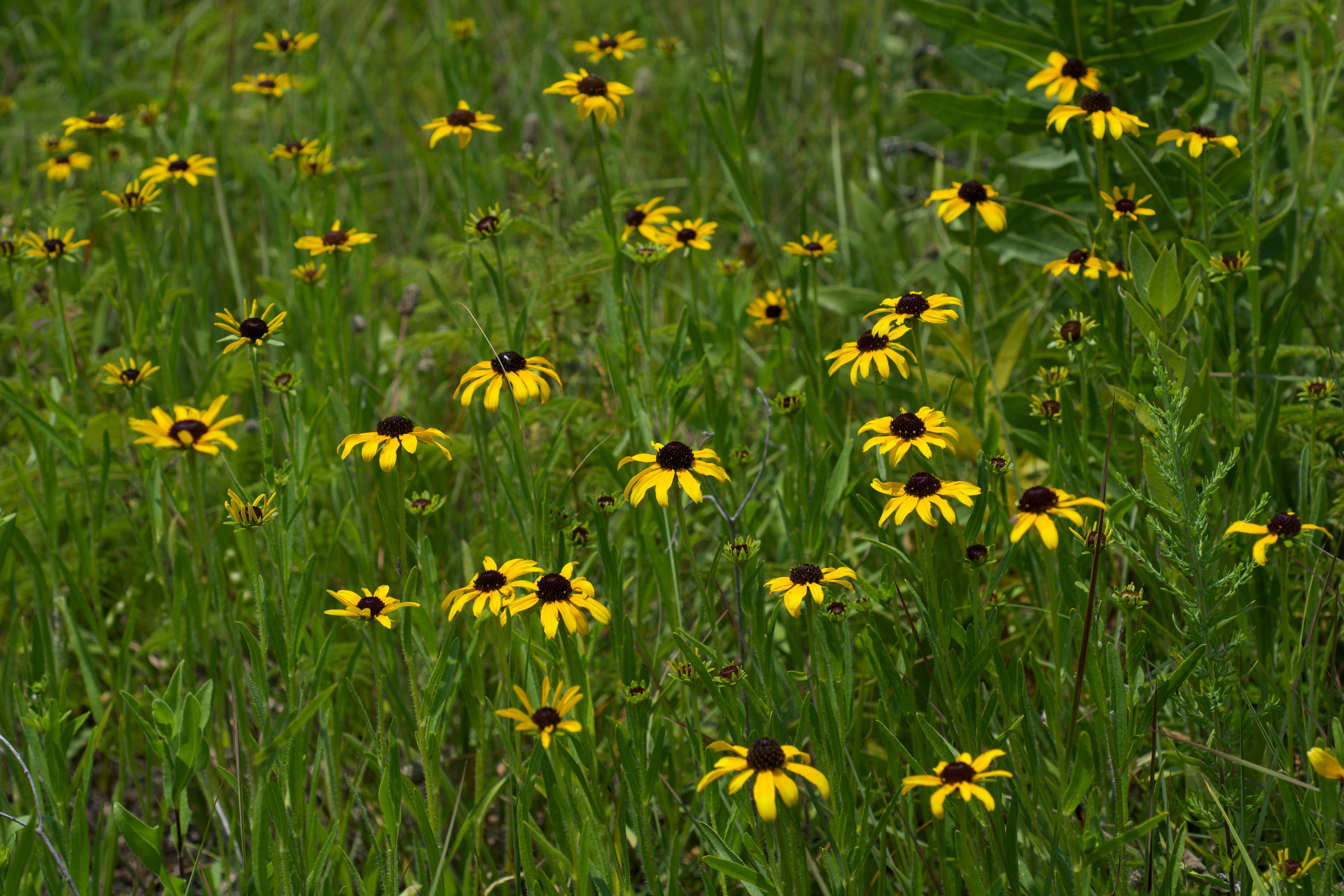

Scientific classification
- Kingdom: Plantae
- Clade: Tracheophytes
- Clade: Angiosperms
- Clade: Eudicots
- Clade: Asterids
- Order: Asterales
- Family: Asteraceae
- Tribe: Heliantheae
- Genus: Rudbeckia
- Species: R. missouriensis

Binomial name
- Rudbeckia missouriensis Engelm. ex C.L. Boynt. & Beadle

= Rudbeckia missouriensis =

Species of plant

Rudbeckia missouriensis, the Missouri coneflower, is a flowering plant in the family Asteraceae and is found mostly in the Ozarks of Missouri and Arkansas in the central United States.
