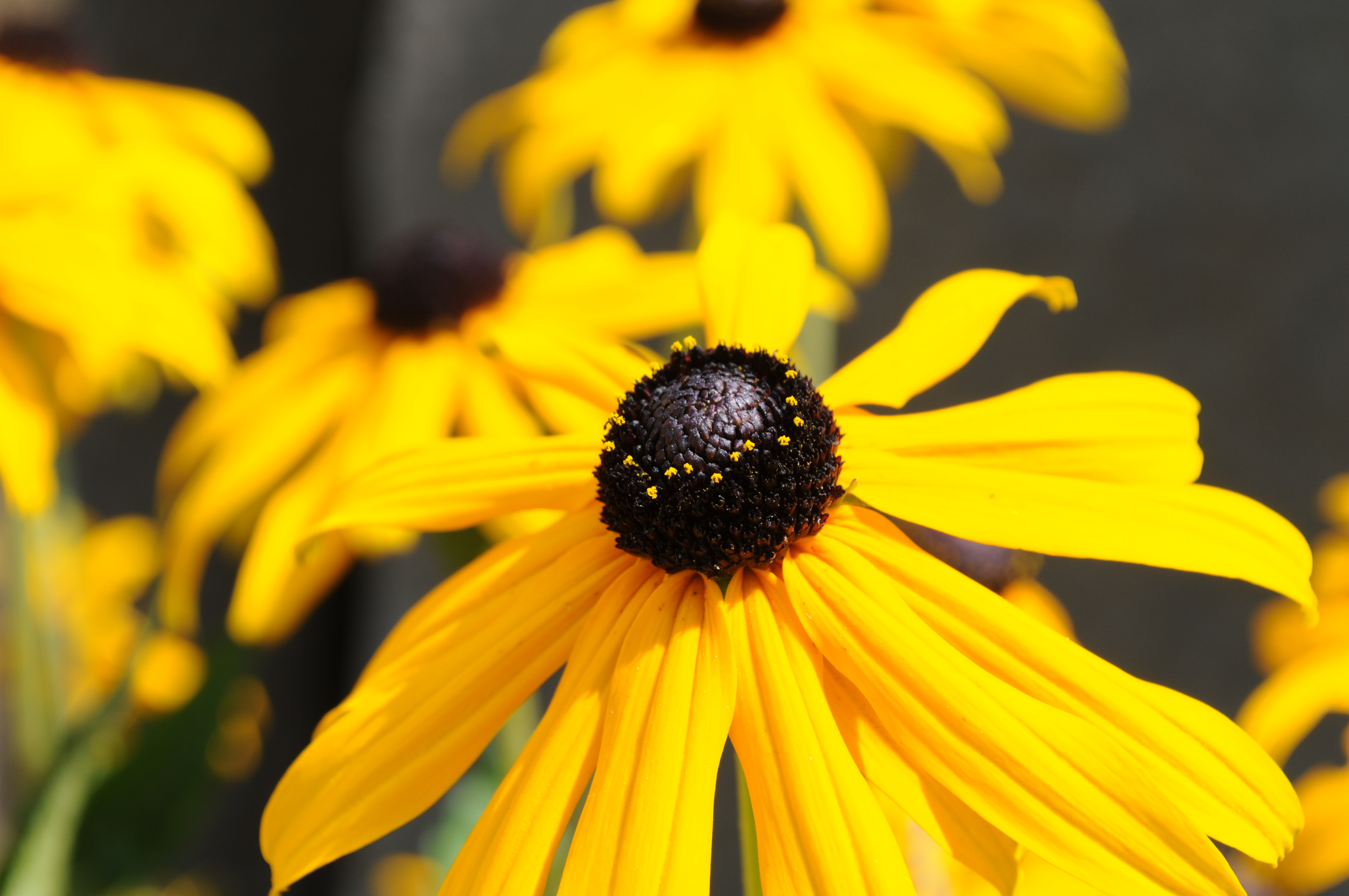
- Rudbeckia hirta

Scientific classification
- Kingdom: Plantae
- Clade: Embryophytes
- Clade: Tracheophytes
- Clade: Angiosperms
- Clade: Eudicots
- Clade: Asterids
- Order: Asterales
- Family: Asteraceae
- Subfamily: Asteroideae
- Tribe: Heliantheae
- Subtribe: Rudbeckiinae
- Genus: Rudbeckia; L.

Type species
- Rudbeckia hirta L.

Species
- See text.

Synonyms
- Centrocarpha D.Don; Dracopis (Cass.) Cass.; Obeliscotheca Vaill. ex Adans.; Peramibus Raf.

= Rudbeckia =

Black-eyed-susans Coneflowers

Genus of flowering plants in the daisy family

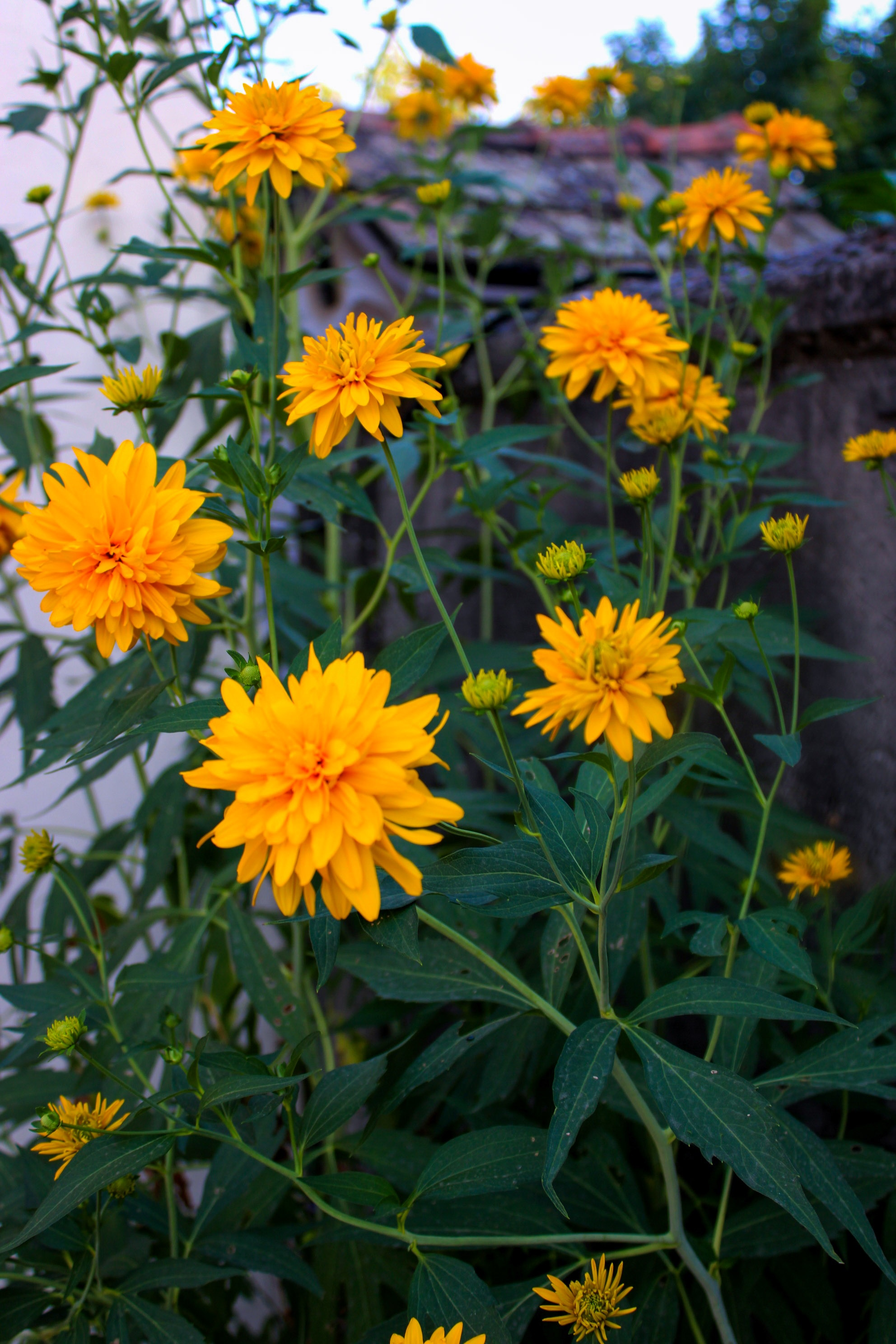
Rudbeckia sp.

Rudbeckia (/rʌdˈbɛkiə/) is a plant genus in the Asteraceae or composite family. Rudbeckia flowers feature a prominent, raised central disc in black, brown shades of green, and in-between tones, giving rise to their familiar common names of coneflowers and black-eyed-susans. All are native to North America, and many species are cultivated in gardens for their showy yellow or gold flower heads that bloom in mid to late summer.

The species are herbaceous, mostly perennial plants (some annual or biennial) growing to 0.5–3.0 m (1.6–9.8 ft) tall, with simple or branched stems. The leaves are spirally arranged, entire to deeply lobed, and 5–25 cm (2.0–9.8 in) long. The flowers are produced in daisy-like inflorescences, with yellow or orange florets arranged in a prominent, cone-shaped head; "cone-shaped" because the ray florets tend to point out and down (are decumbent) as the flower head opens.

A large number of species have been proposed within Rudbeckia, but most are now regarded as synonyms of the limited list given below.

Several currently accepted species have several accepted varieties. Some of them (for example the black-eyed susan, R. hirta), are popular garden flowers distinguished for their long flowering times. Many cultivars of these species are known.

Rudbeckia is one of at least four genera within the flowering plant family Asteraceae whose members are commonly known as coneflowers; the others are Echinacea, Dracopis, and Ratibida.

Rudbeckia species are eaten by the caterpillars of some Lepidoptera species including cabbage moths and dot moths.

== Etymology ==
The name was given by Carolus Linnaeus to honor his patron and fellow botanist at Uppsala University, Olof Rudbeck the Younger (1660–1740), as well as Rudbeck's late father Olof Rudbeck the Elder (1630–1702), a distinguished Naturalist, Philologist, and Doctor of Medicine (he had discovered the lymphatic system), and founder of Sweden's first botanic garden, now the Linnaean Garden at Uppsala. In 1730 Linnaeus had been invited into the home of the younger Rudbeck (now almost 70) as tutor of his youngest children. Rudbeck had then recommended Linnaeus to replace him as a lecturer at the university and as the botanical garden demonstrator, even though Linnaeus was only in his second year of studies. In his book The Compleat Naturalist: A Life of Linnaeus, Wilfred Blunt quotes Linnaeus's dedication:

So long as the earth shall survive and as each spring shall see it covered with flowers, the Rudbeckia will preserve your glorious name. I have chosen a noble plant in order to recall your merits and the services you have rendered, a tall one to give an idea of your stature, and I wanted it to be one which branched and which flowered and fruited freely, to show that you cultivated not only the sciences but also the humanities. Its rayed flowers will bear witness that you shone among savants like the sun among the stars; its perennial roots will remind us that each year sees you live again through new works. Pride of our gardens, the Rudbeckia will be cultivated throughout Europe and in distant lands where your revered name must long have been known. Accept this plant, not for what it is but for what it will become when it bears your name.

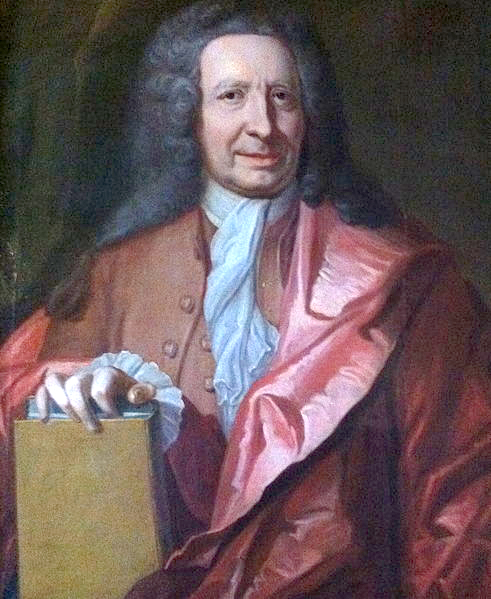
Olof Rudbeck The Younger (1660–1740), patron of Linnaeus. Oil portrait in Uppsala University's Universitethuset

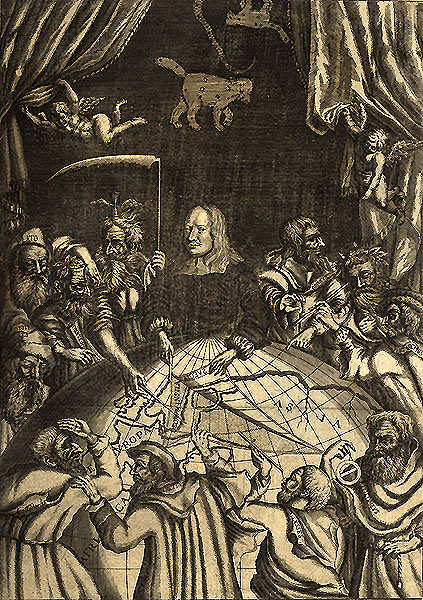
A 1689 frontispiece portrait of polymath Olof Rudbeck The Elder (1630–1702), who in 1655 established Sweden's first botanic garden, now the Linnaean Garden at Uppsala University. He is shown surrounded by sages, mythic and historical: Hesiod, Plato, Aristotle, Apollodorus, Tacitus, Odysseus, Ptolemy, Plutarch and Orpheus.

== Species ==
As of November 2024, the following species were accepted by Plants of the World Online.

- Rudbeckia alismifolia Torr. & A.Gray
- Rudbeckia alpicola Piper
- Rudbeckia amplexicaulis Vahl
- Rudbeckia auriculata (Perdue) Kral
- Rudbeckia californica A.Gray
- Rudbeckia deamii S.F.Blake
- Rudbeckia fulgida Aiton
- Rudbeckia glaucescens Eastw.
- Rudbeckia graminifolia (Torr. & A.Gray) C.L.Boynton & Beadle
- Rudbeckia grandiflora (Sweet) C.C.Gmel. ex DC.
- Rudbeckia heliopsidis Torr. & A.Gray
- Rudbeckia hirta L.
- Rudbeckia klamathensis P.B.Cox & Urbatsch
- Rudbeckia laciniata L.
- Rudbeckia maxima Nutt.
- Rudbeckia missouriensis Engelm. ex C.L.Boynton & Beadle
- Rudbeckia mohrii A.Gray
- Rudbeckia mollis Elliott
- Rudbeckia montana A.Gray
- Rudbeckia nitida Nutt.
- Rudbeckia occidentalis Nutt.
- Rudbeckia palustris Eggert ex C.L.Boynton & Beadle
- Rudbeckia scabrifolia L.E.Br.
- Rudbeckia spathulata Michx.
- Rudbeckia speciosa Wender.
- Rudbeckia subtomentosa Pursh
- Rudbeckia sullivantii C.L.Boynton & Beadle
- Rudbeckia terranigrae J.J.N.Campb. & W.R.Seymour
- Rudbeckia texana (Perdue) P.B.Cox & Urbatsch
- Rudbeckia triloba L.
- Rudbeckia umbrosa C.L.Boynton & Beadle

The following species were formerly included in the genus.

- Echinacea atrorubens (as R. atrorubens)
- Echinacea pallida (as R. pallida)
- Echinacea purpurea (as R. purpurea)
- Helianthus angustifolius (as R. angustifolia)
- Helianthus porteri (as R. porteri)
- Helianthus radula (as R. radula)
- Ratibida columnifera (as R. columnaris or R. columnifera)
- Ratibida tagetes (as R. tagetes)

== Uses ==
Many species are used in prairie restorations, for ornamental use, and by livestock for forage. An abundance of these plants on a rangeland indicates good health. They are deer and rabbit resistant.

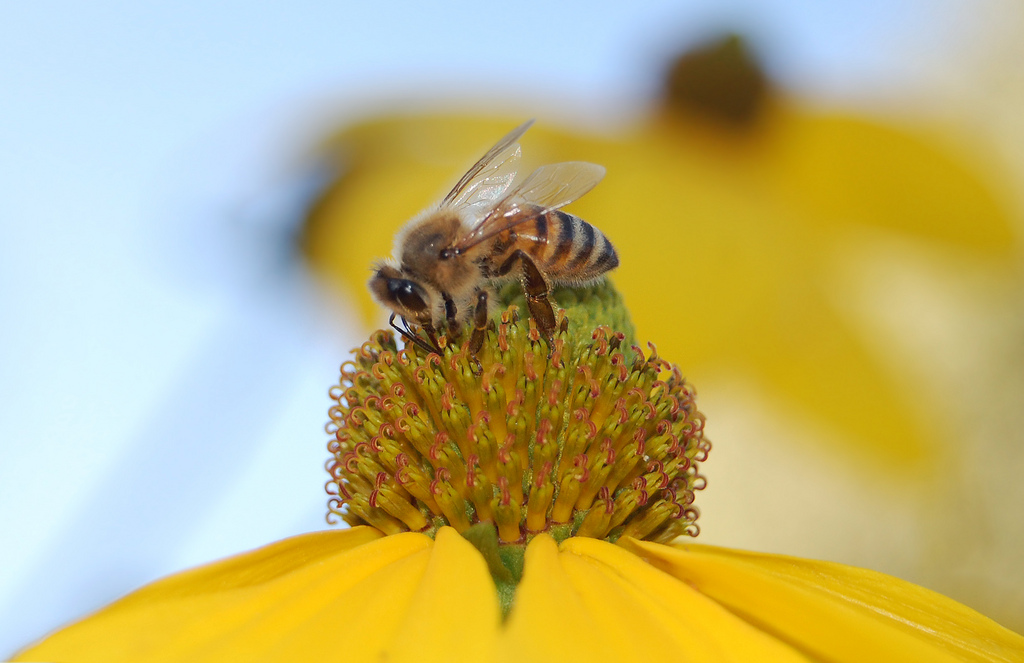
Honey bee feeding on a coneflower (Rudbeckia)

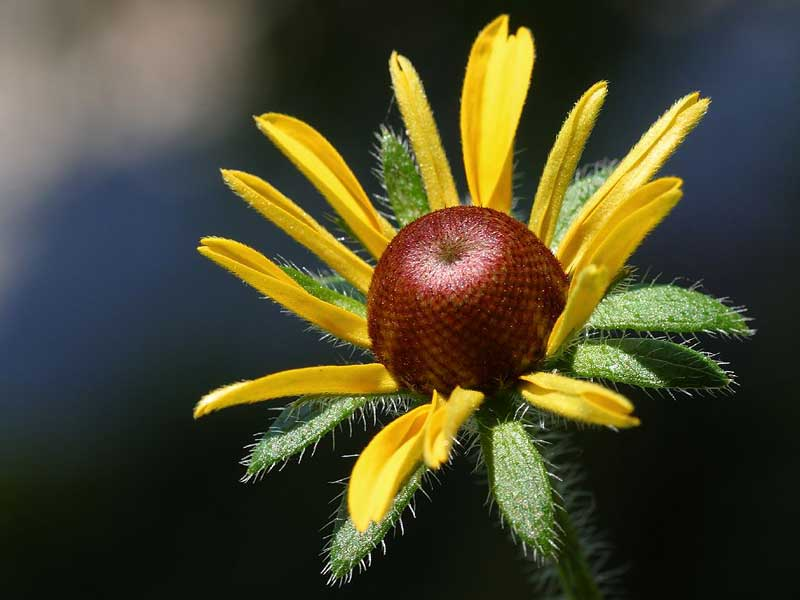
Rudbeckia hirta

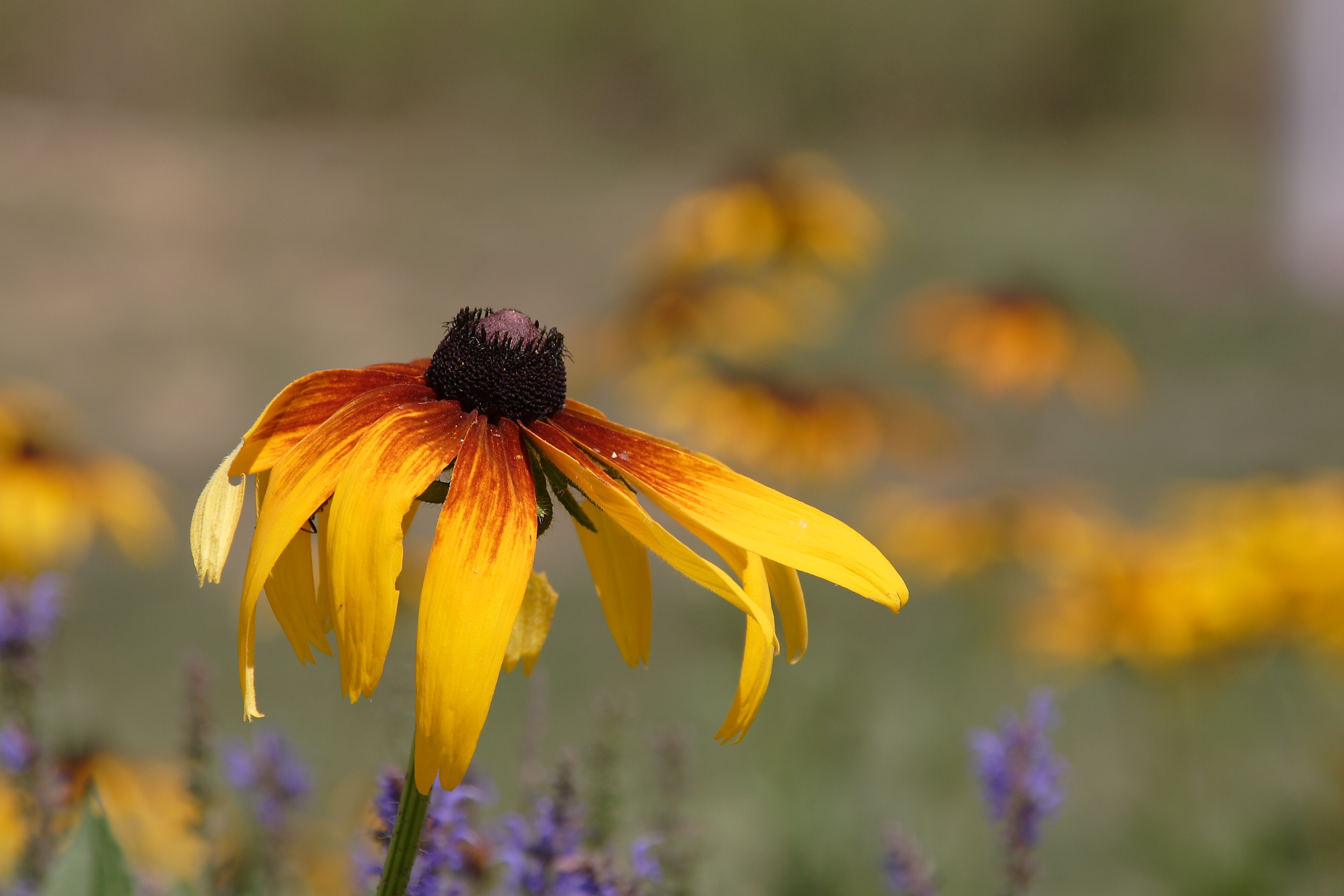
Prairie restoration

Rudbeckia hirta

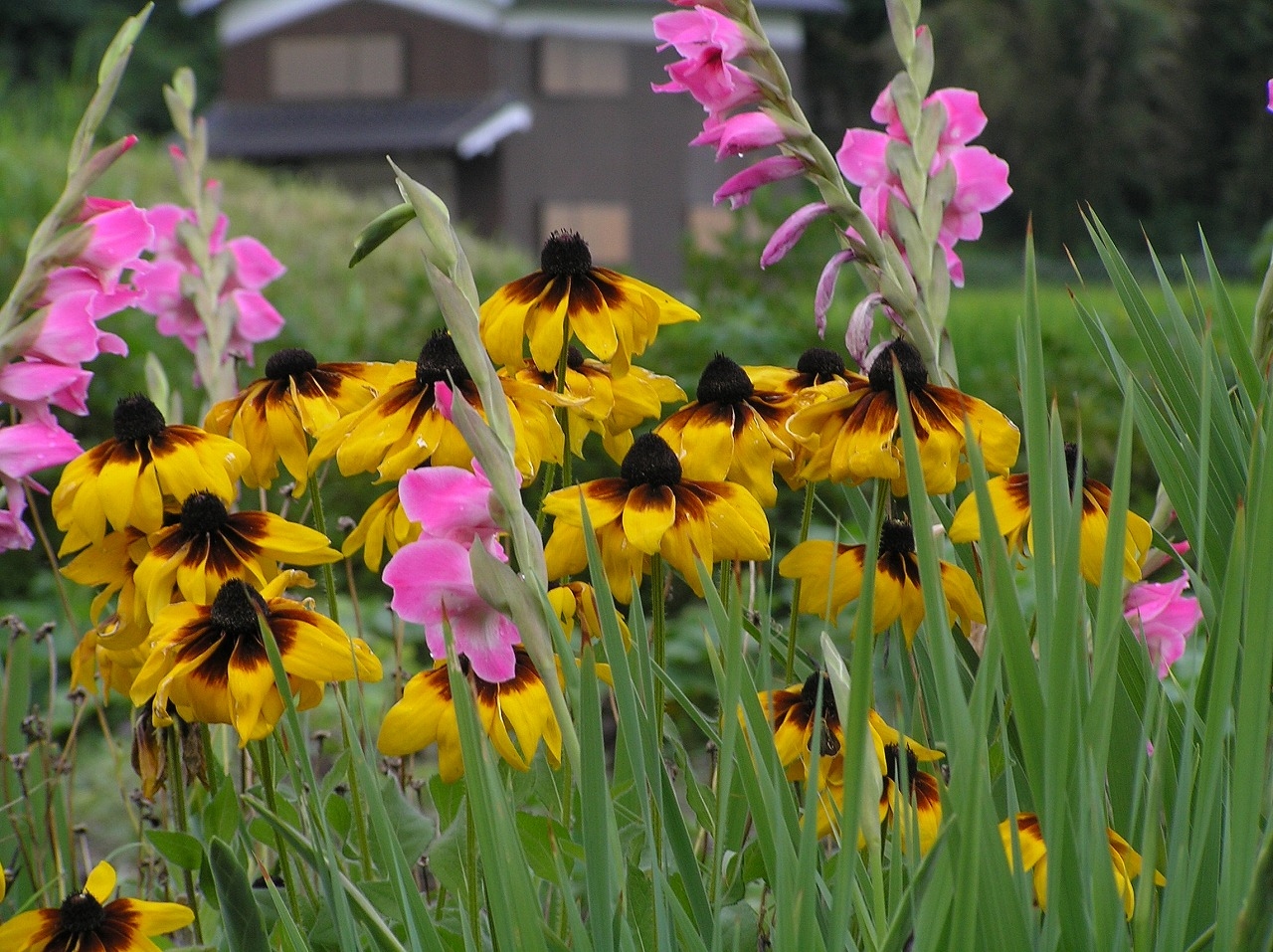
Rudbeckia with gladiolus in Japan

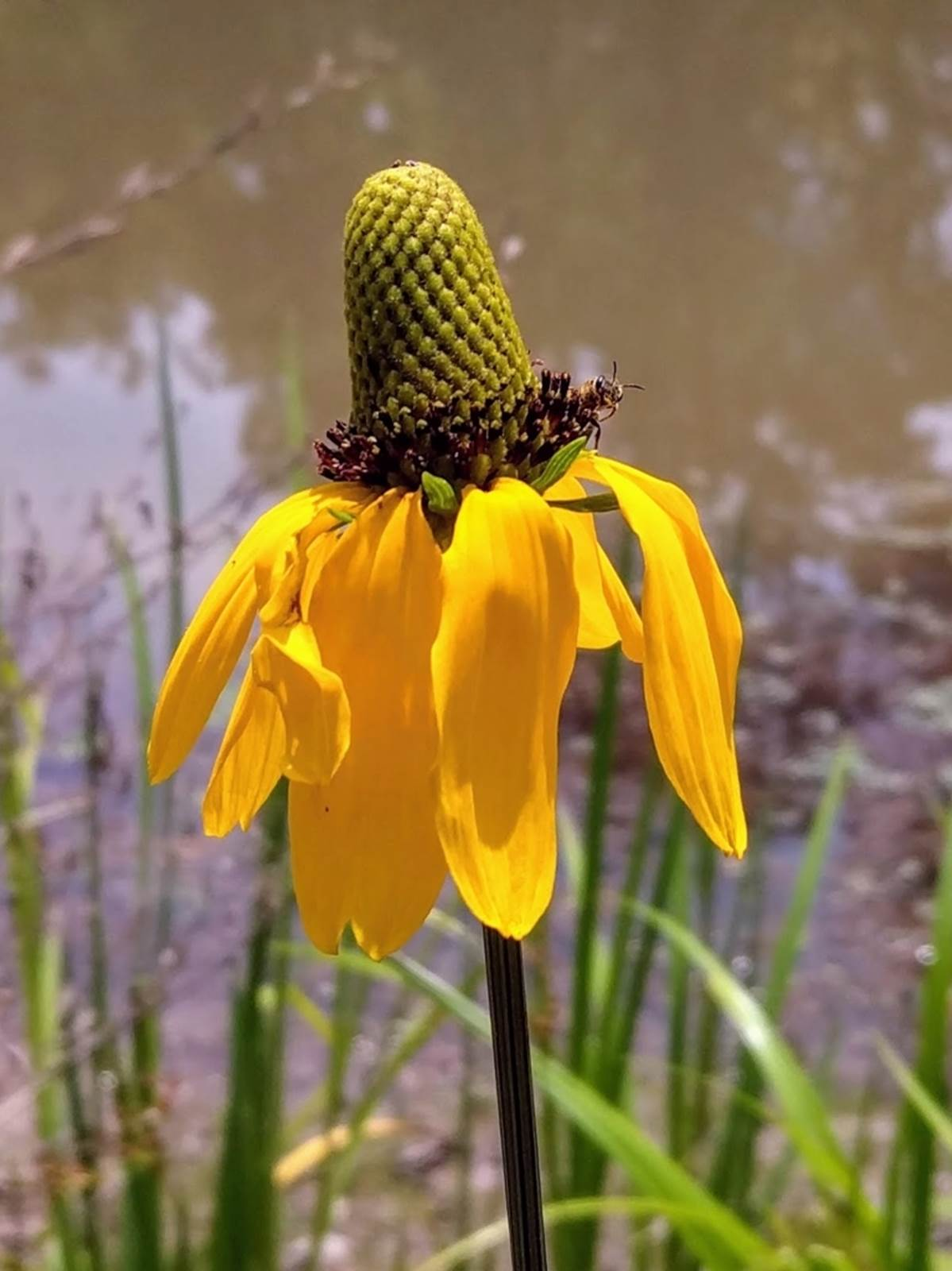
Rudbeckia texana

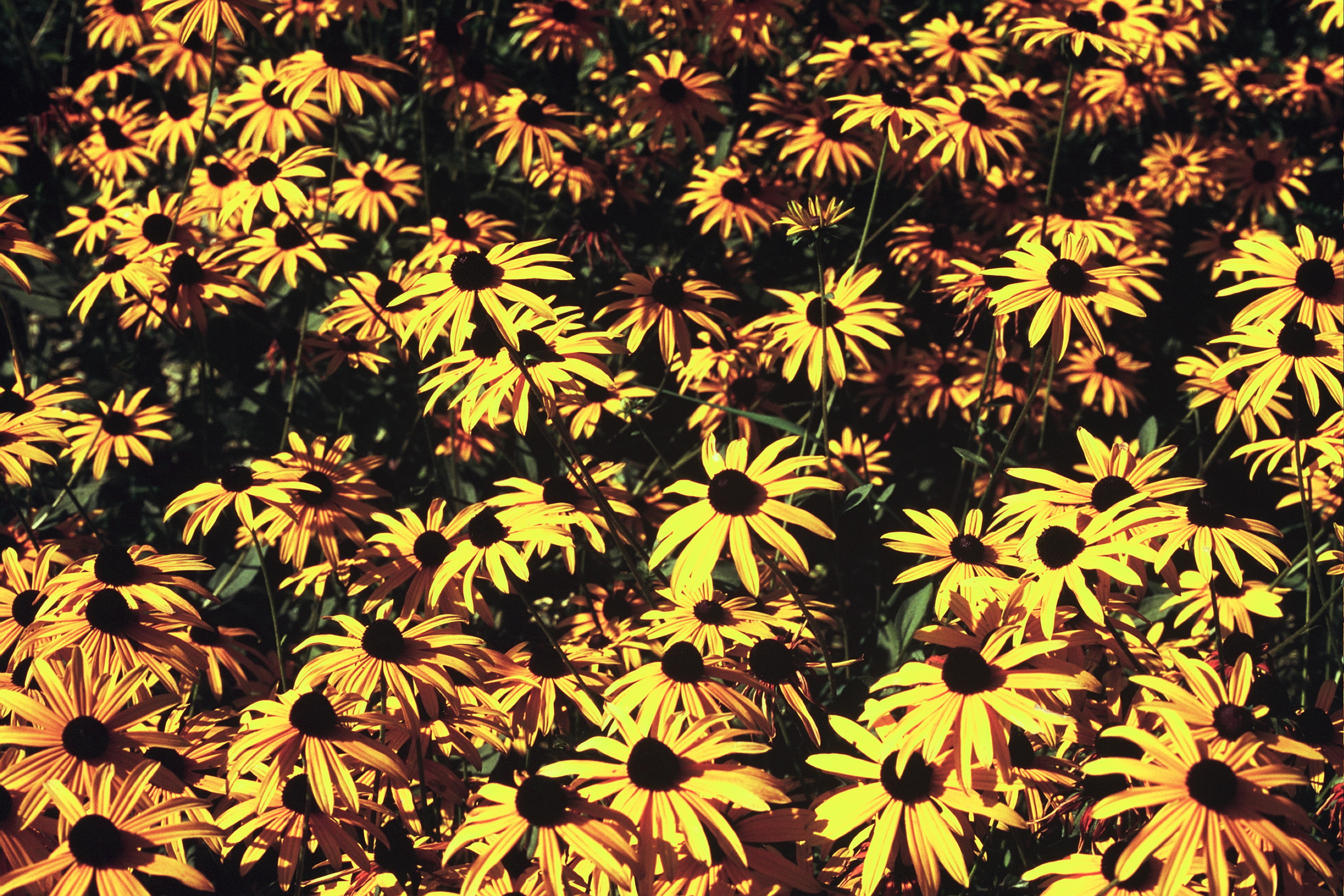
Rudbeckia in Poland

== Bibliography ==
- Urbatsch, Lowell E.; Baldwin, Bruce G.; Donoghue, Michael J. (July 2000). "Phylogeny of the Coneflowers and Relatives (Heliantheae: Asteraceae) Based on Nuclear rDNA Internal Transcribed Spacer (ITS) Sequences and Chlorplast DNA Restriction Site Data". Systematic Botany. 25 (3): 539. doi:10.2307/2666695. JSTOR 2666695. S2CID 28581817.
