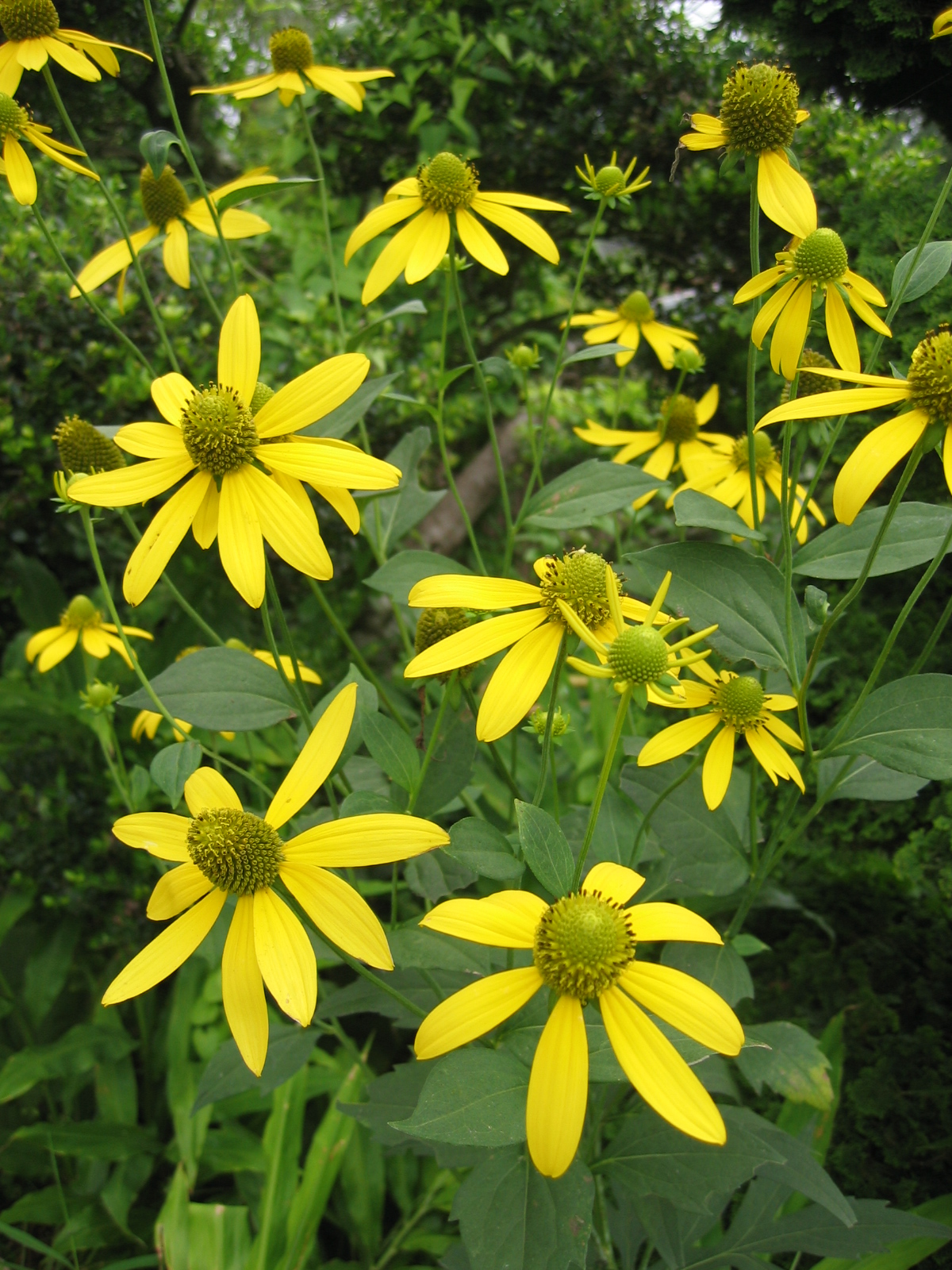

Conservation status
- Secure (NatureServe)

Scientific classification
- Kingdom: Plantae
- Clade: Tracheophytes
- Clade: Angiosperms
- Clade: Eudicots
- Clade: Asterids
- Order: Asterales
- Family: Asteraceae
- Tribe: Heliantheae
- Genus: Rudbeckia
- Species: R. laciniata

Binomial name
- Rudbeckia laciniata L.

= Rudbeckia laciniata =

Species of flowering plant

Rudbeckia laciniata, the cutleaf coneflower, is a species of flowering plant in the family Asteraceae. Other common names include cutleaf, goldenglow, green-headed coneflower, tall coneflower, sochan and thimbleweed. It is native to North American floodplains, stream banks, and moist forests. Although toxic to animals, the leaves have culinary uses.

== Description ==
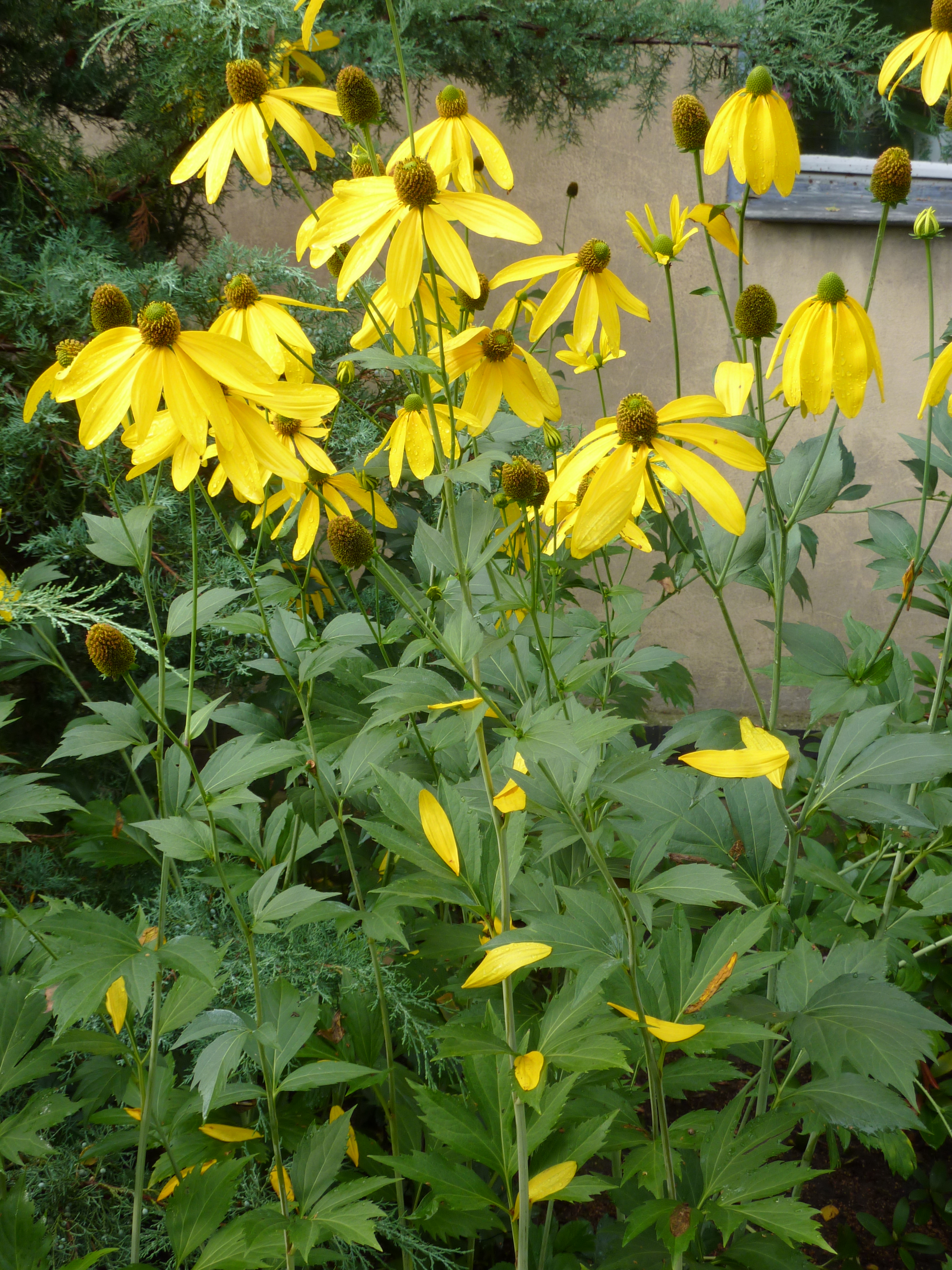
Growing in garden

It is a robust herbaceous perennial plant growing up to 2 metres (6 1/2 feet) tall. Long rhizomes are formed as persistence organs with fibrous roots. The stem is bare. The alternate leaves are usually divided into a petiole and a leaf blade. They are up to 20 cm (7 3/4 in) long, broadly ovate, somewhat glaucous, and often deeply dissected, with smooth to roughly serrated margins. The smooth or hairy leaf blade is simple or one to two-pinnate. The leaflets are lobed three to eleven times.

=== Inflorescence ===
The composite flowers (flower heads) are produced in late summer and autumn. The disc flowers are green to yellowish green, while the rays are pale yellow. In umbrella-clustered total inflorescences, two to 25 cup-shaped partial inflorescences stand together. The flower heads, which have a diameter of 7 to 15 cm (3 to 6 in), stand on long stems. 8 to 15 irregularly arranged, foliage-like, smooth to hairy bracts have a length of up to 2 cm and usually a ciliate border. The inflorescence base is almost spherical to conical in shape. The chaff leaves are 3 to 7 millimetres (1/8 to 1/4 in) long.

In a flower basket, there are 8–12 ray flowers and 150 to over 300 tubular disk flowers. The golden-yellow rays are 1.5 to 5 cm long and 4 to 14 mm (1/8 to 1/2 in) wide and are later repulsed. The yellow to yellowish-green tubular flowers are 9 to 30 mm (3/8 to 1 1/8 in) in length and 10 to 23 mm in diameter, with yellow corolla lobes 3.5 to 5 mm (1/8 to 3/16 in) long. The stylus branches have a length of 1 to 1.5 mm.

The 3 to 4.5 mm long achenes have a crown-shaped or four up to 1.5 mm long scales consisting of pappus.

=== Similar species ===
R. hirta is similar, with a hemispherical disk and orangish-yellow rays.

== Taxonomy ==
Up to six varieties of R. laciniata are currently recognized. The varieties ampla and heterophylla are considered to be the most distinctive, while the others are less so. There is variation in treatment among authors, with the less distinctive varieties sometimes being subsumed into laciniata, and variety ampla sometimes recognized at the species level.

The six varieties are:

- Rudbeckia laciniata var. ampla – Native west of the Great Plains, into the Rocky Mountains
- Rudbeckia laciniata var. bipinnata – Native to New England and the Mid-Atlantic area
- Rudbeckia laciniata var. digitata – Native to the Southeastern Coastal Plain
- Rudbeckia laciniata var. heterophylla – Endemic to Levy County, Florida
- Rudbeckia laciniata var. humilis – Native to the southern Appalachian Mountains
- Rudbeckia laciniata var. laciniata – Widespread and common, native across eastern North America

=== Etymology ===
The Latin specific epithet laciniata refers to the pinnately divided leaves.

== Distribution and habitat ==
It is native to North America, where it is widespread in both Canada and the United States. Its natural habitat is wet sites in floodplains, along stream banks, and in moist forests.

== Cultivation ==
Rudbeckia laciniata is widely cultivated in gardens and for cut flowers. Numerous cultivars have been developed, of which 'Herbstsonne' ("Autumn sun") and 'Starcadia Razzle Dazzle' have gained the Royal Horticultural Society's Award of Garden Merit. The cultivar 'Goldquelle' features double yellow, pom-pom blooms that are 8 cm across.

Rudbeckia laciniata has long been cultivated as an ornamental plant and arrived in Paris in the private garden of Vespasian Robin at the beginning of the 17th century. Caspar Bauhin also received this ornamental plant from Robin in 1622, who described it as 'Doronicum americanum laciniato folio'. The first recorded garden in Germany is Altdorf, dating back to 1646. The double-flowered form, which is mainly cultivated, has been known since around 1894. The first naturalizations on river banks in Central Europe were observed in the 18th century. Anton Johann Krocker reported about it in 1787 in Queistal near Flinsburg in eastern Upper Lusatia. As an ornamental plant, varieties are used in parks and gardens in temperate areas, for example also filled forms. In Europe, Rudbeckia laciniata has become a wild species in various countries. Besides Europe, Rudbeckia laciniata is a neophyte in China and New Zealand. [6]

The Lady Bird Johnson Wildflower Center notes that "Because it spreads rampantly by underground stems, cut-leaf coneflower is only appropriate for large sites."

== Toxicity ==
The plant is somewhat toxic to livestock. One report cites circumstantial evidence of poisoning to horses, sheep and pigs.

== Uses ==
Traditionally, the young leaves have been gathered from the wild and eaten in the early spring. They are greatly favored as a potherb (cooked). Although some references suggest using this plant as salad greens (raw), traditional use is as cooked greens. This is assumed to be done to remove toxins, although there is little evidence of their presence.

== Gallery ==
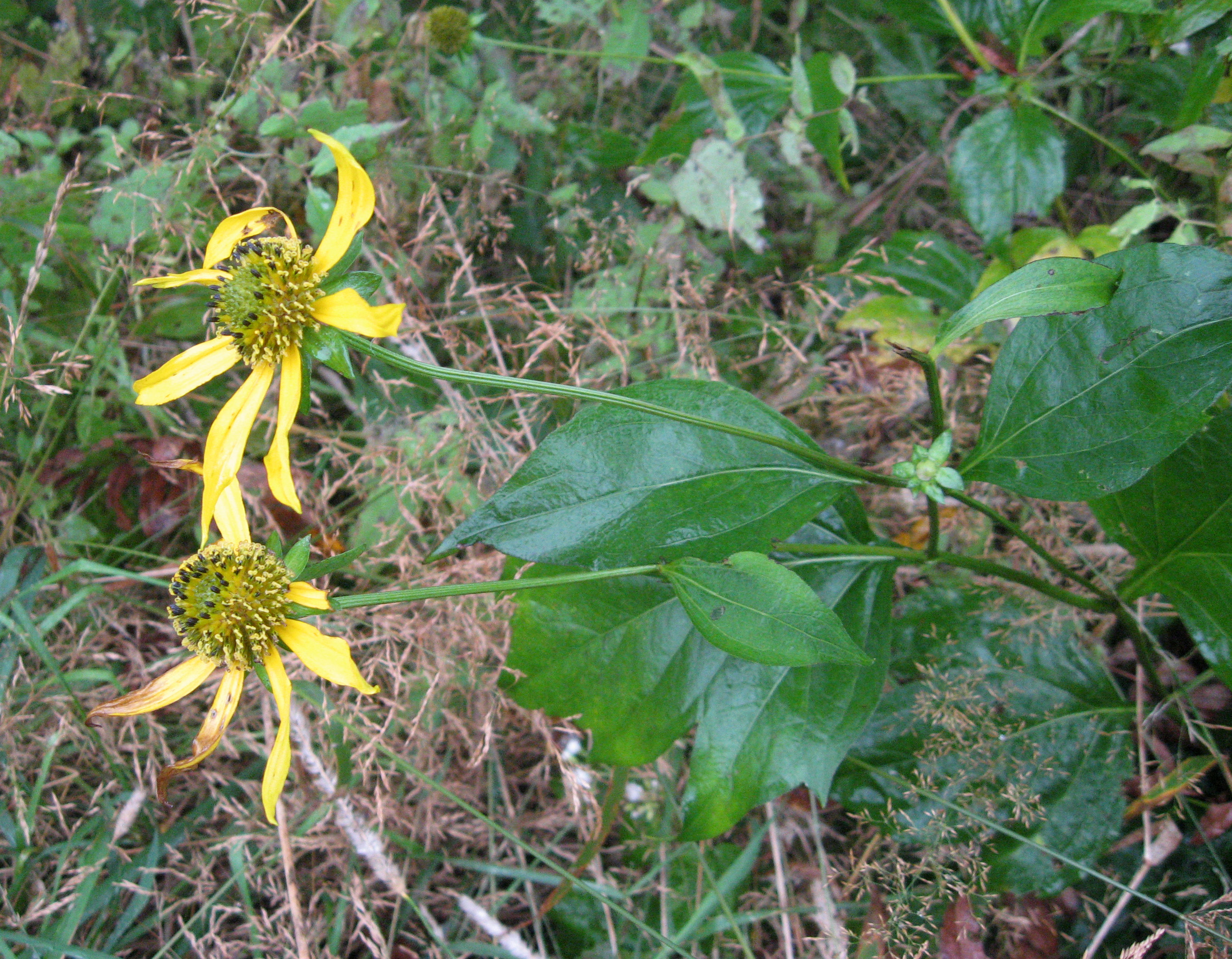
Variety humilis has shallowly lobed leaves and large flowers (Kuwohi (formerly Clingmans Dome), North Carolina)

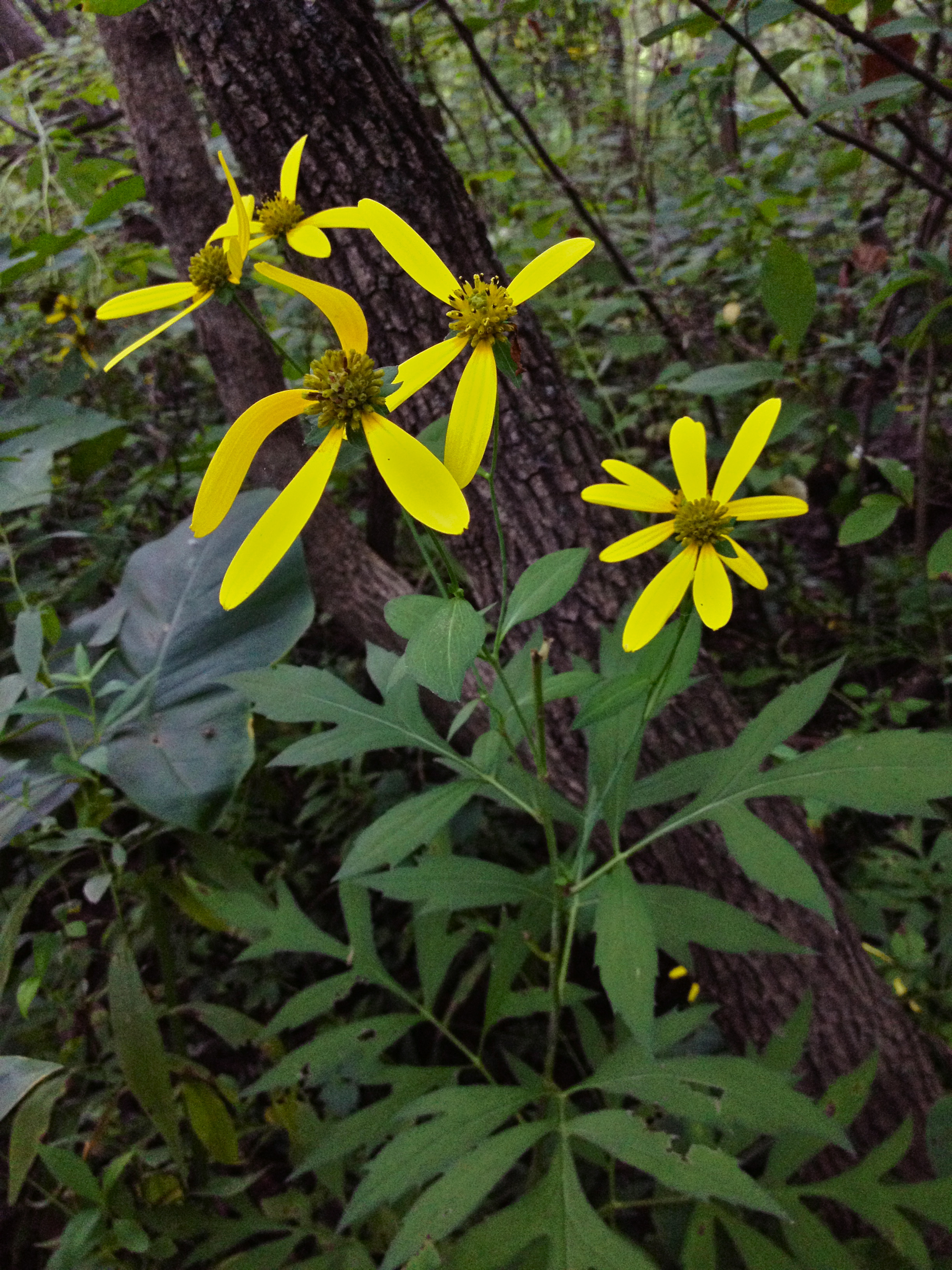
Variety laciniata, showing deeply divided leaves (Washington, D.C.)

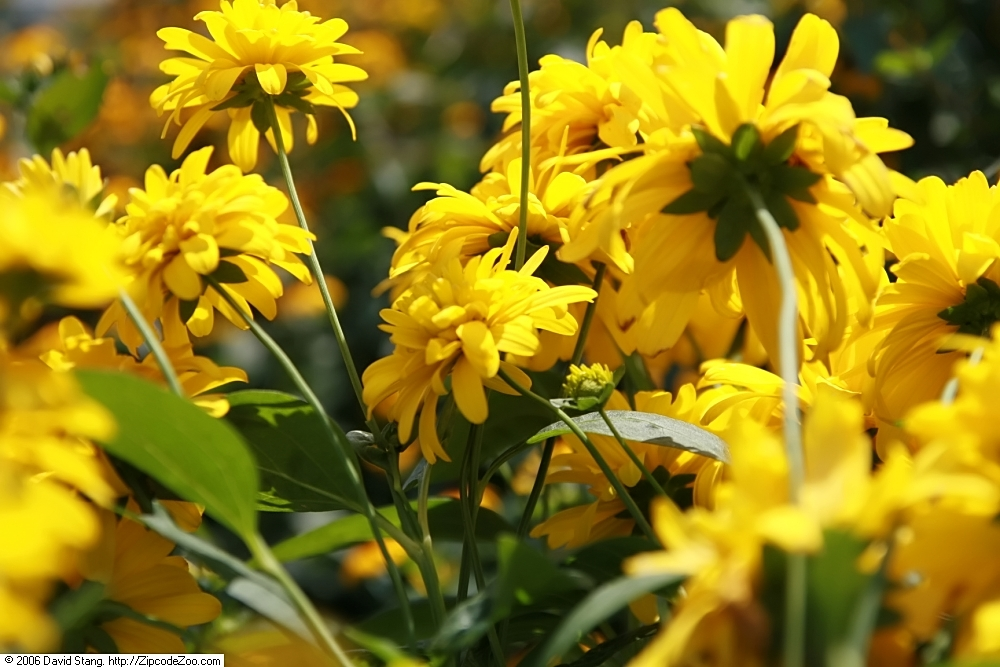
Flowers of the cultivar 'Goldquelle'

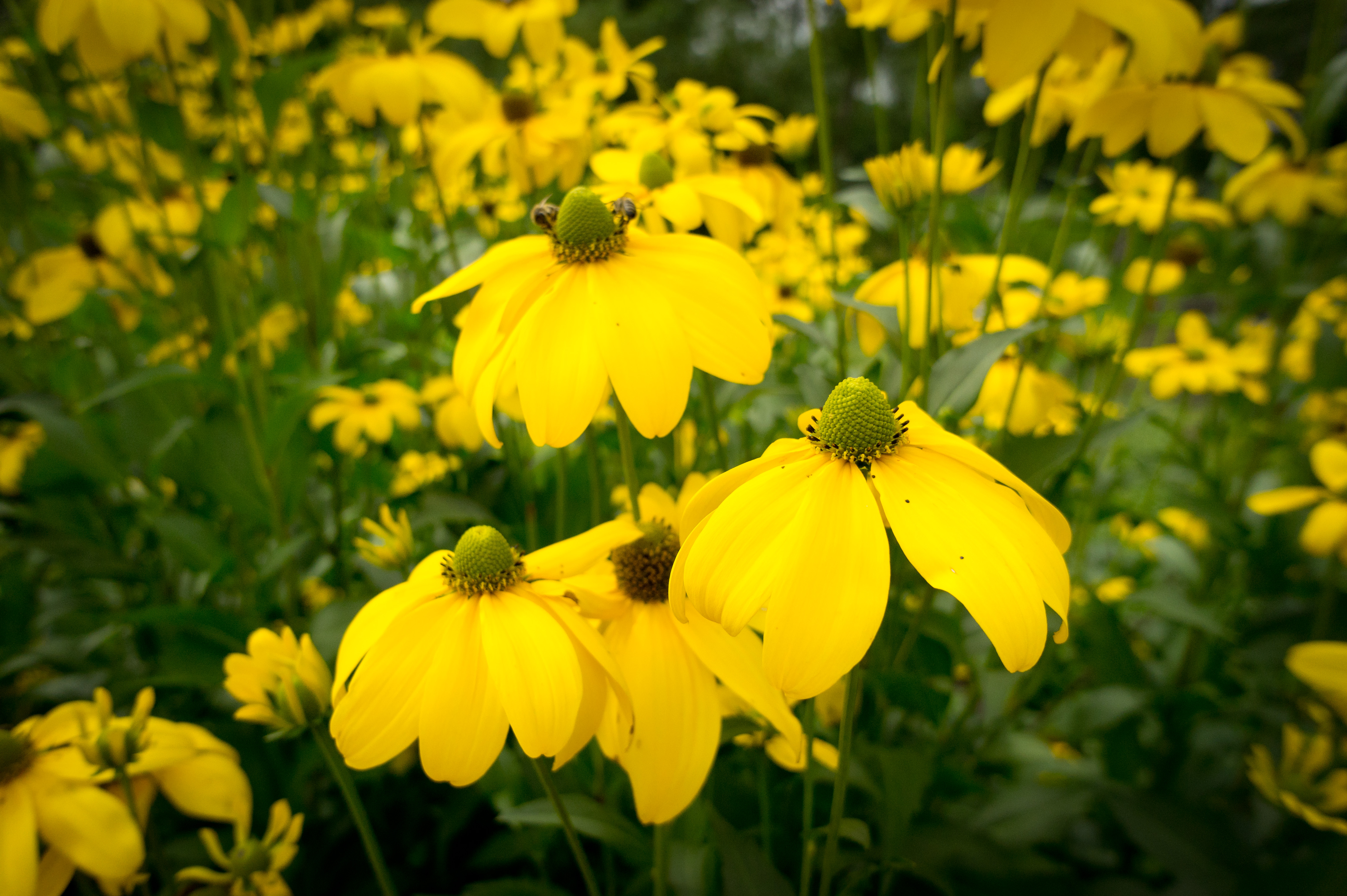
Flower heads

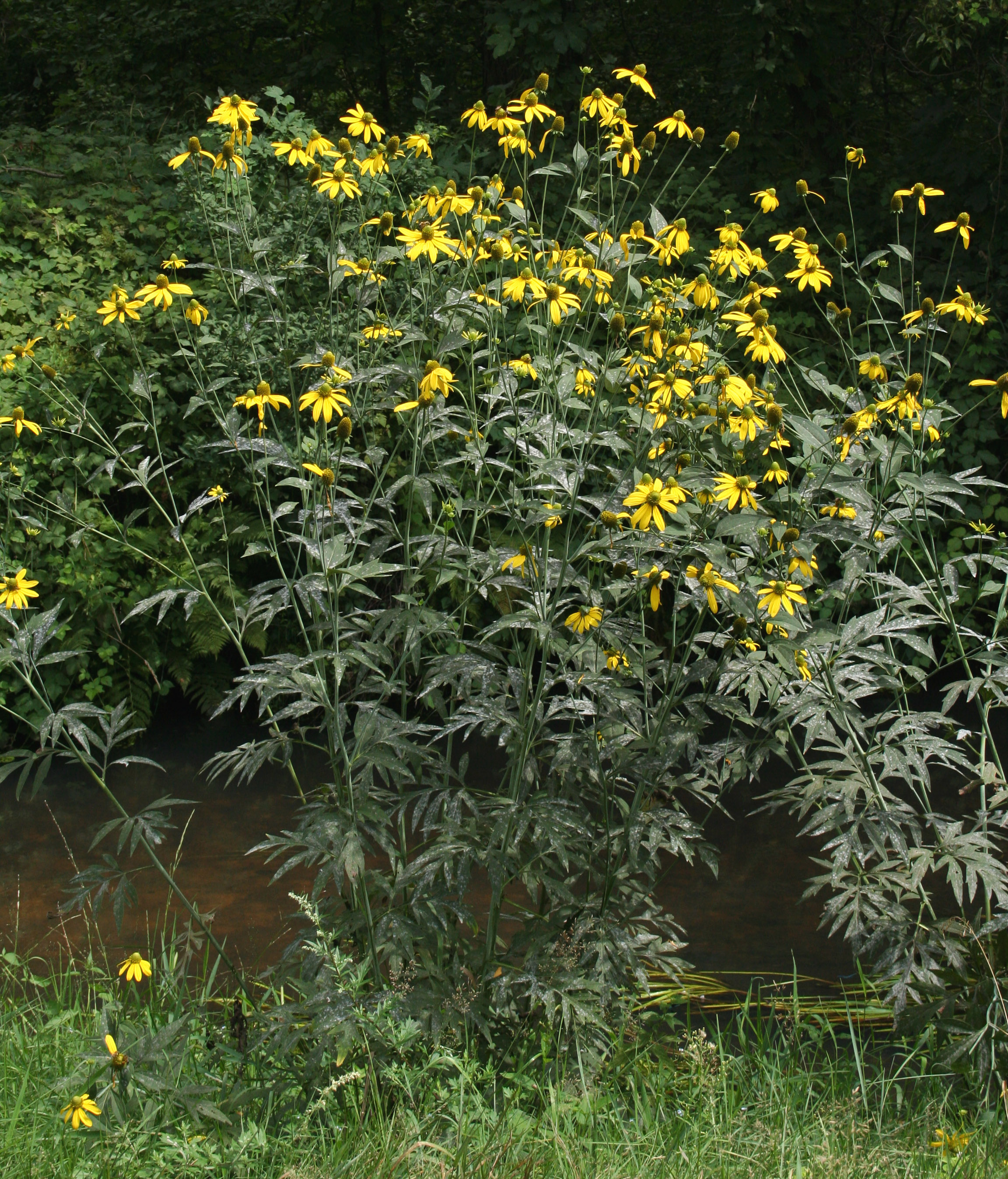
Growing near a stream

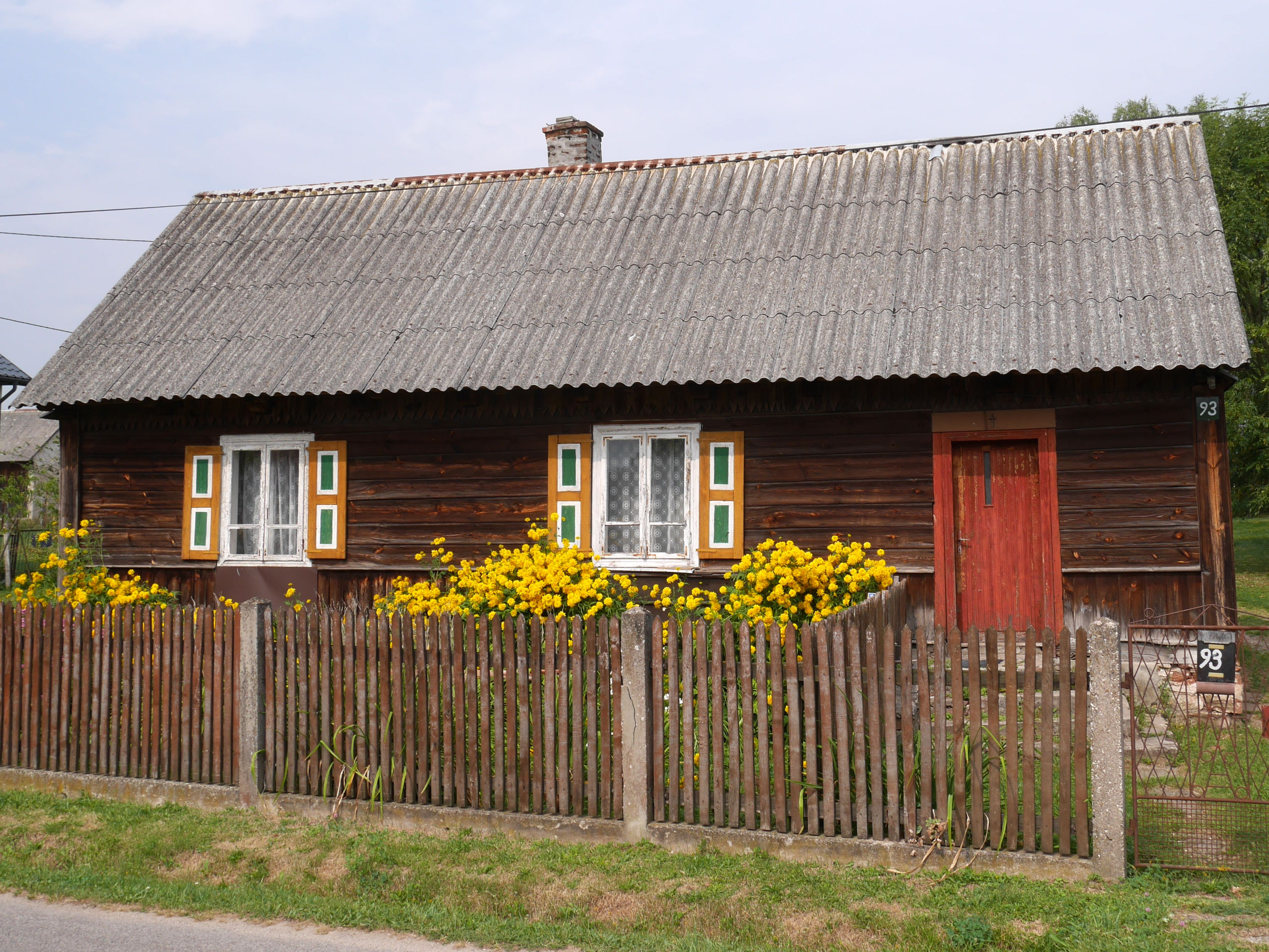
In a house garden ('Goldquelle')

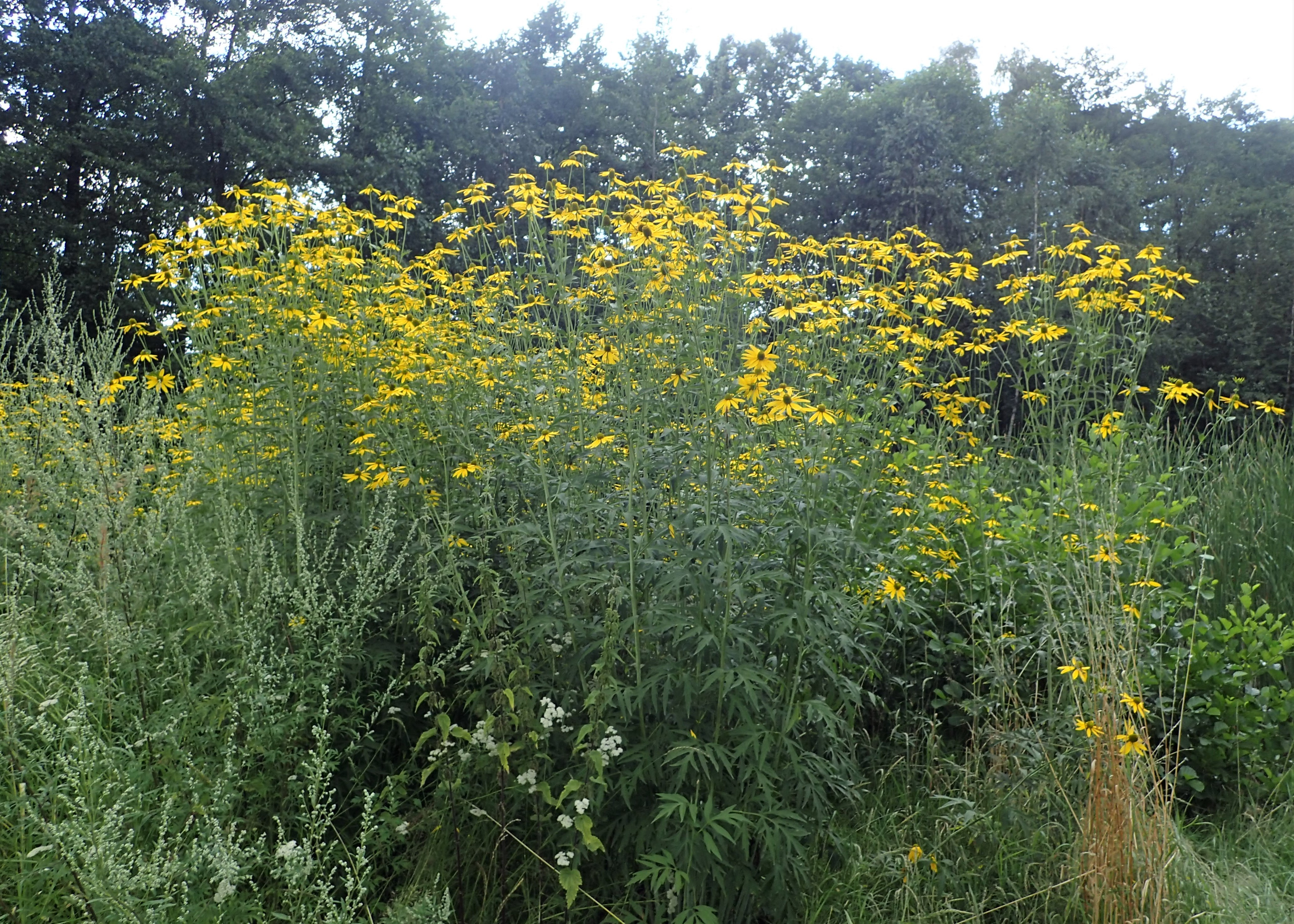
In a woodland
