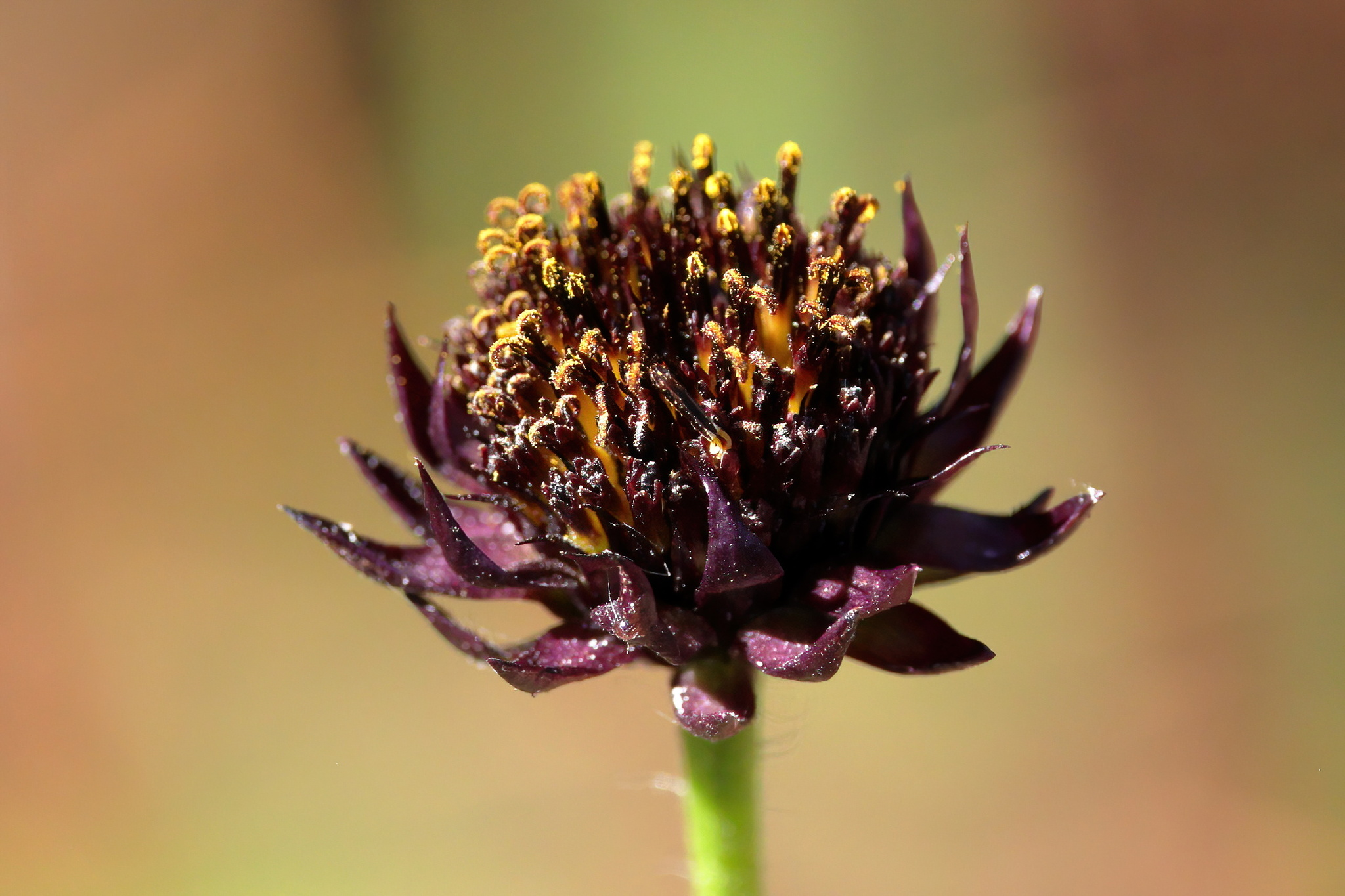

Conservation status
- Apparently Secure (NatureServe)

Scientific classification
- Kingdom: Plantae
- Clade: Tracheophytes
- Clade: Angiosperms
- Clade: Eudicots
- Clade: Asterids
- Order: Asterales
- Family: Asteraceae
- Genus: Helianthus
- Species: H. radula

Binomial name
- Helianthus radula (Pursh) Torr. & A.Gray

Synonyms
- Rudbeckia radula Pursh; Centrocarpha radula D.Don

= Helianthus radula =

Species of sunflower

Helianthus radula is a North American species of sunflower known by the common name rayless sunflower or pineland sunflower. It is native to the southeastern United States from eastern Louisiana to South Carolina.

Helianthus radula grows in sandy, open woodlands such as pine barrens. It is a perennial herb up to 100 cm (40 inches) tall. One plant usually produces only one flower head, containing 0-8 yellow ray florets surrounding sometimes as many as 150 or more yellow or brown disc florets.
