= Hickory Hill Park =

Park in Iowa City, Iowa, US

Coordinates: 41°40′20.46″N 91°30′35.91″W

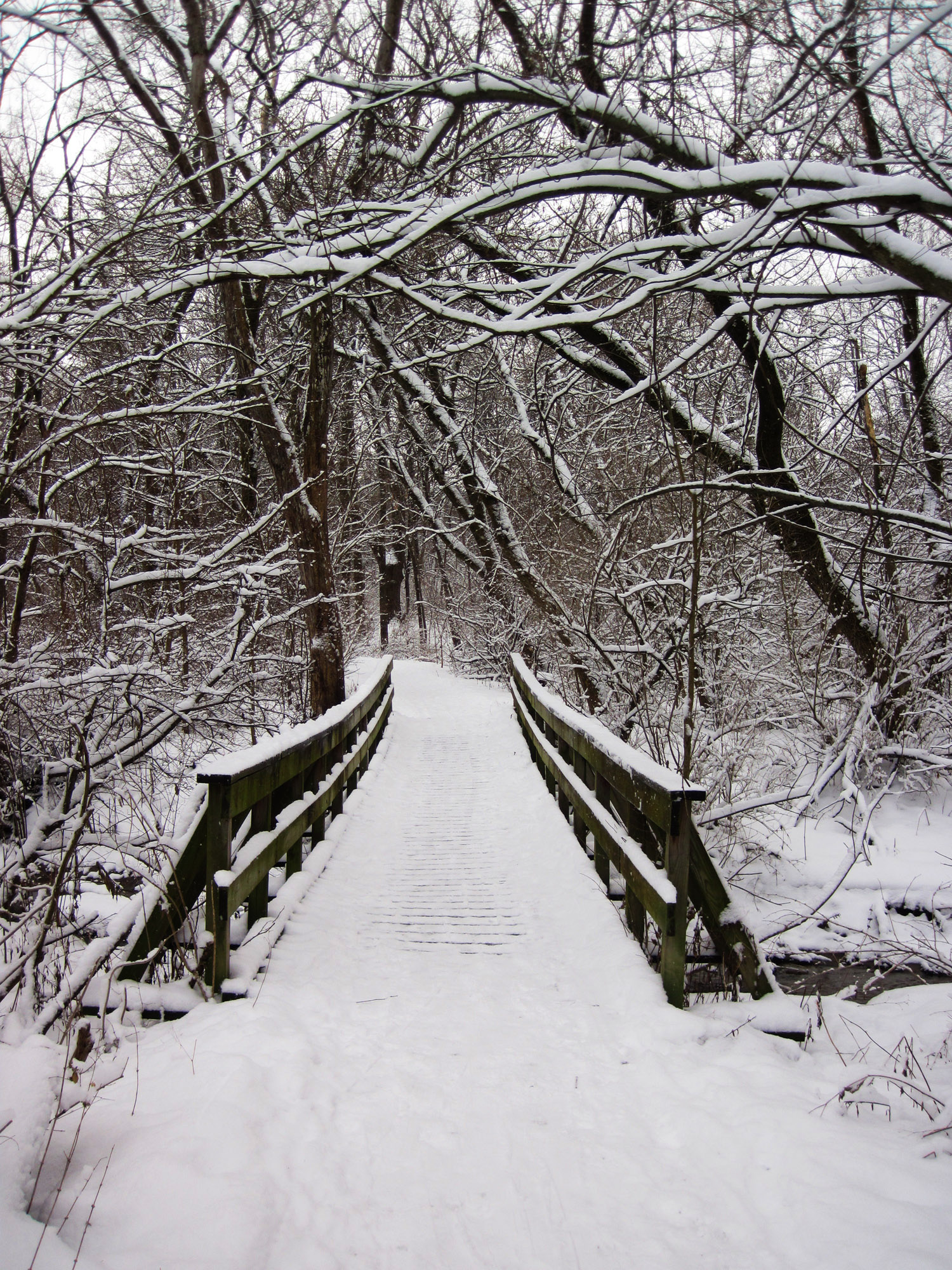
Wooded trail at Hickory Hill Park

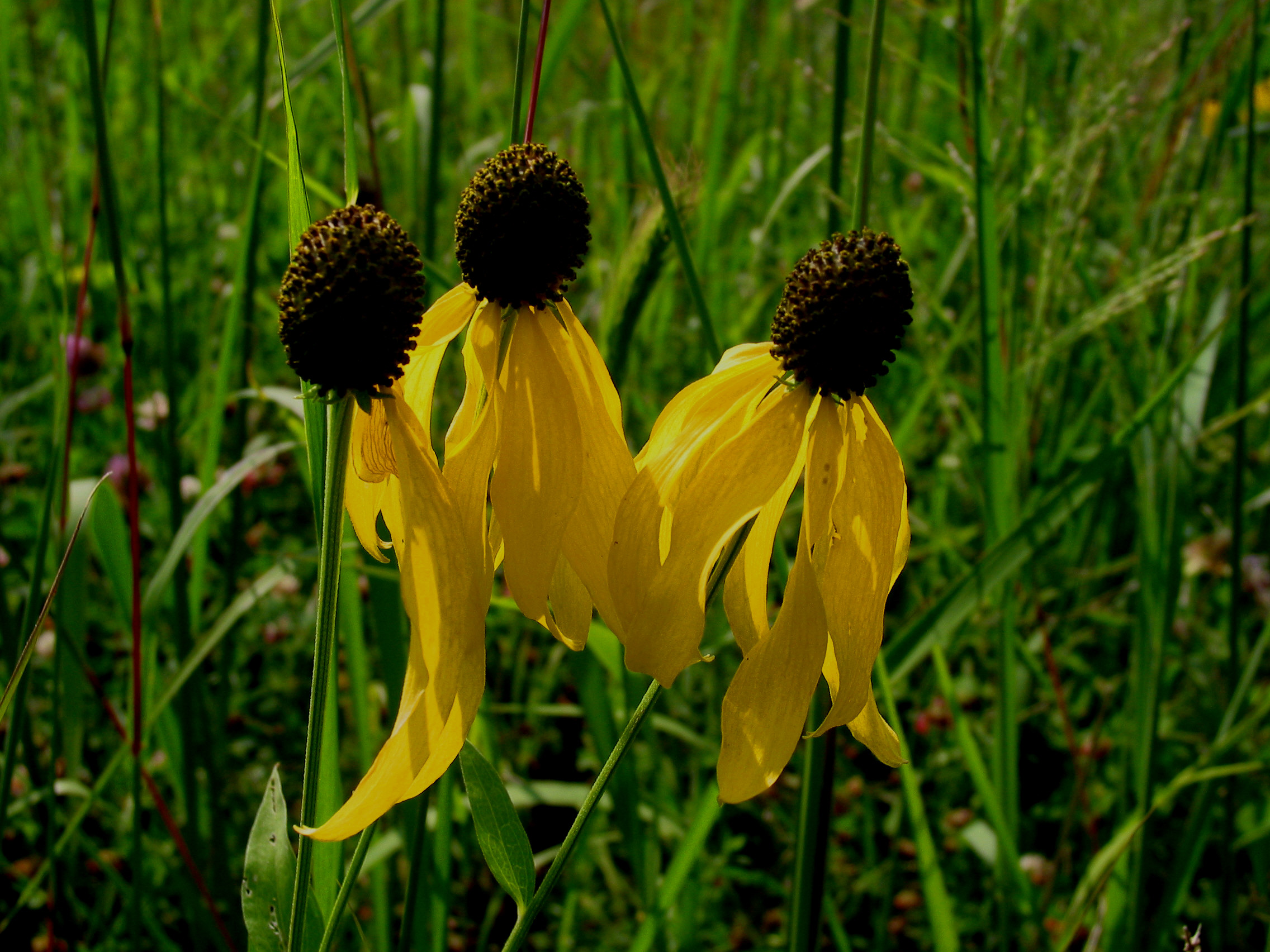
Coneflowers at Hickory Hill Park

Hickory Hill Park is a large natural area in northeast Iowa City, Iowa consisting of 190 acres (0.77 km^{2}) of forest, abandoned fields, reconstructed prairie, wetlands, and parkland centered on Ralston Creek and its tributary drainages. It is owned and administered by the city, with help from Friends of Hickory Hill Park. The park is popular with day hikers, dog walkers, cross-country skiers, sledders, and picnickers. Iowa City’s Hickory Hill Park should not be confused with Hickory Hills Park near Waterloo, or Hickory Hills Park in Tama County.

== Park history ==
Hickory Hill Park traces its origins to 1927 with a 40-acre (160,000 m^{2}) parcel of wood lots and farm fields purchased for expansion of the adjacent Oakland Cemetery. Oakland expanded slowly, leaving much of the land to naturalize. An area of 50 acres (200,000 m^{2}) was added in 1952 and the area was formally dedicated as a park in 1968, thanks to efforts of Dee Norton and other citizens. The park was expanded to 190 acres (0.77 km^{2}) in the 1980s as part of a storm water control project. In April 2008, Friends of Hickory Hill Park raised $160,000 to purchase a 16-acre (65,000 m^{2}) parcel that abuts the northwest edge of the park. The parcel includes wooded and open areas. The remains of an ice dam and an ice house may be found on the property.

== Park layout ==
Hickory Hill Park is irregular in shape owing to its piecemeal land acquisitions. Much of the park is steeply sloped and wooded, with large areas of abandoned fields that are slowly being naturalized. Two picnic shelter areas are available, one near the far south entrance off Bloomington Street and one in the west off Conklin Lane. A large retention dam, built in the 1990s, sits in the center of the park.

== Park threats ==
Until the 1990s, Hickory Hill Park was at the edge of the city, and the park boundaries abutted farmlands to the north and east. However, development of the First Avenue extension to the east and Scott Avenue to the north enclosed the park, and new housing and commercial developments within this area greatly reduced the potential expansion area for Hickory Hill. Expansion plans are also limited by the adjacent Oakland Cemetery, St. Joseph’s Cemetery, and Regina High School. Other threats include trail erosion, and invasive species including garlic mustard, multiflora rose, and tree of heaven.
