= Oakland Cemetery (Iowa City, Iowa) =

Cemetery in Iowa City, Iowa, US

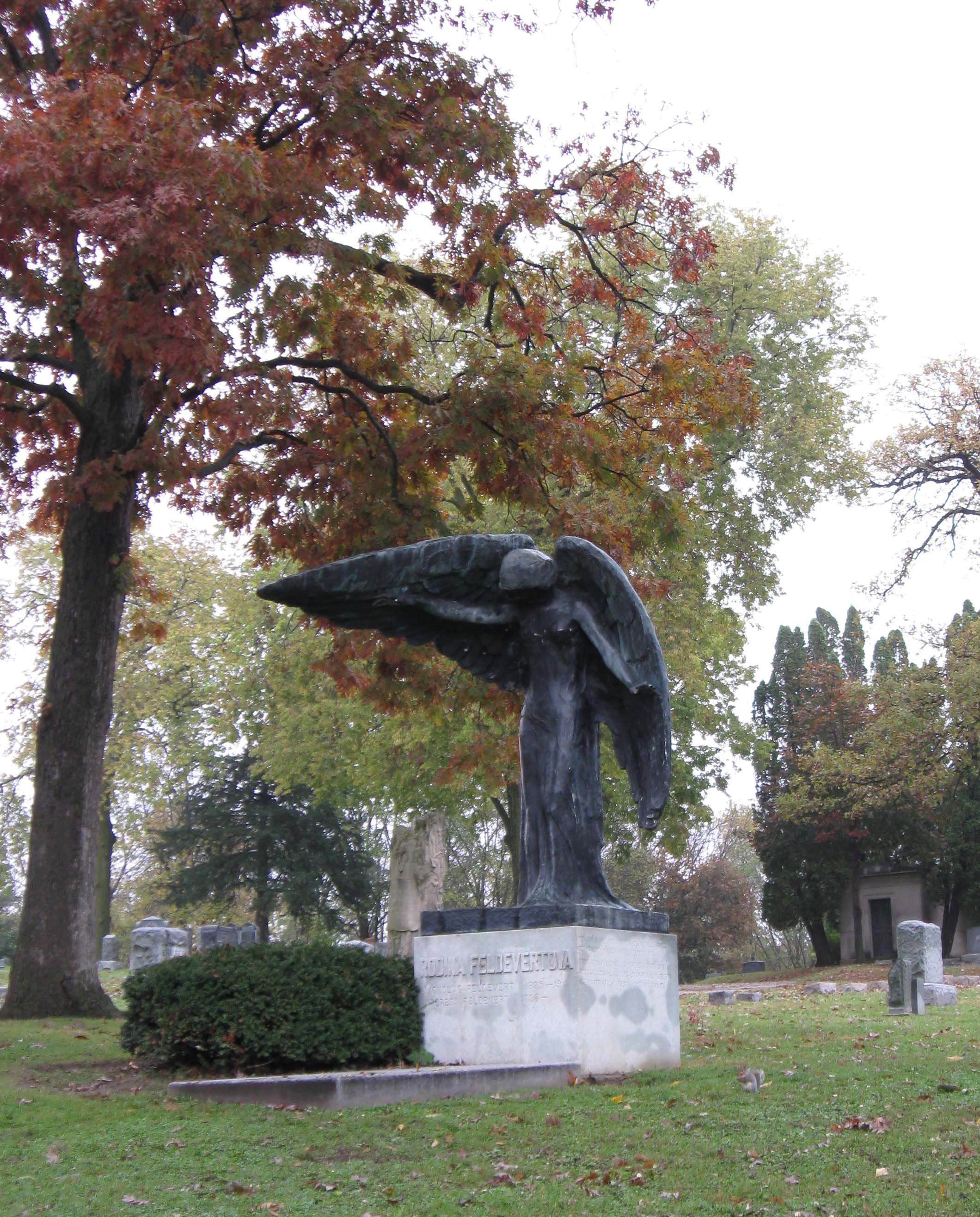
- Black Angel, Oakland Cemetery
- Interactive map of Oakland Cemetery

Details
- Established: 1843
- Location: 1000 Brown Street, Iowa City, Iowa
- Country: United States
- Coordinates: 41.67°N 91.52°W
- Type: Public
- Owned by: City of Iowa City
- Size: 40 acres (160,000 m^{2})
- Find a Grave: Oakland Cemetery

Oakland Cemetery is on the north side of Iowa City, Iowa, and has served as the main cemetery for Iowa City since 1843.

== Cemetery history ==
Oakland Cemetery was deeded to the residents of Iowa City on February 13, 1843. Over the years the cemetery has expanded to 40 acres (160,000 m^{2}). Supported by taxpayers, the cemetery is a non-perpetual care facility. As a public institution anyone can be buried in Oakland, but traditionally it was a Protestant cemetery; Catholics were usually buried in the nearby St. Joseph Cemetery, and Jewish Iowa Citians were buried at Agudas Achim Cemetery. Oakland is adjacent to Hickory Hill Park, a large natural area in Iowa City.

== Black Angel ==
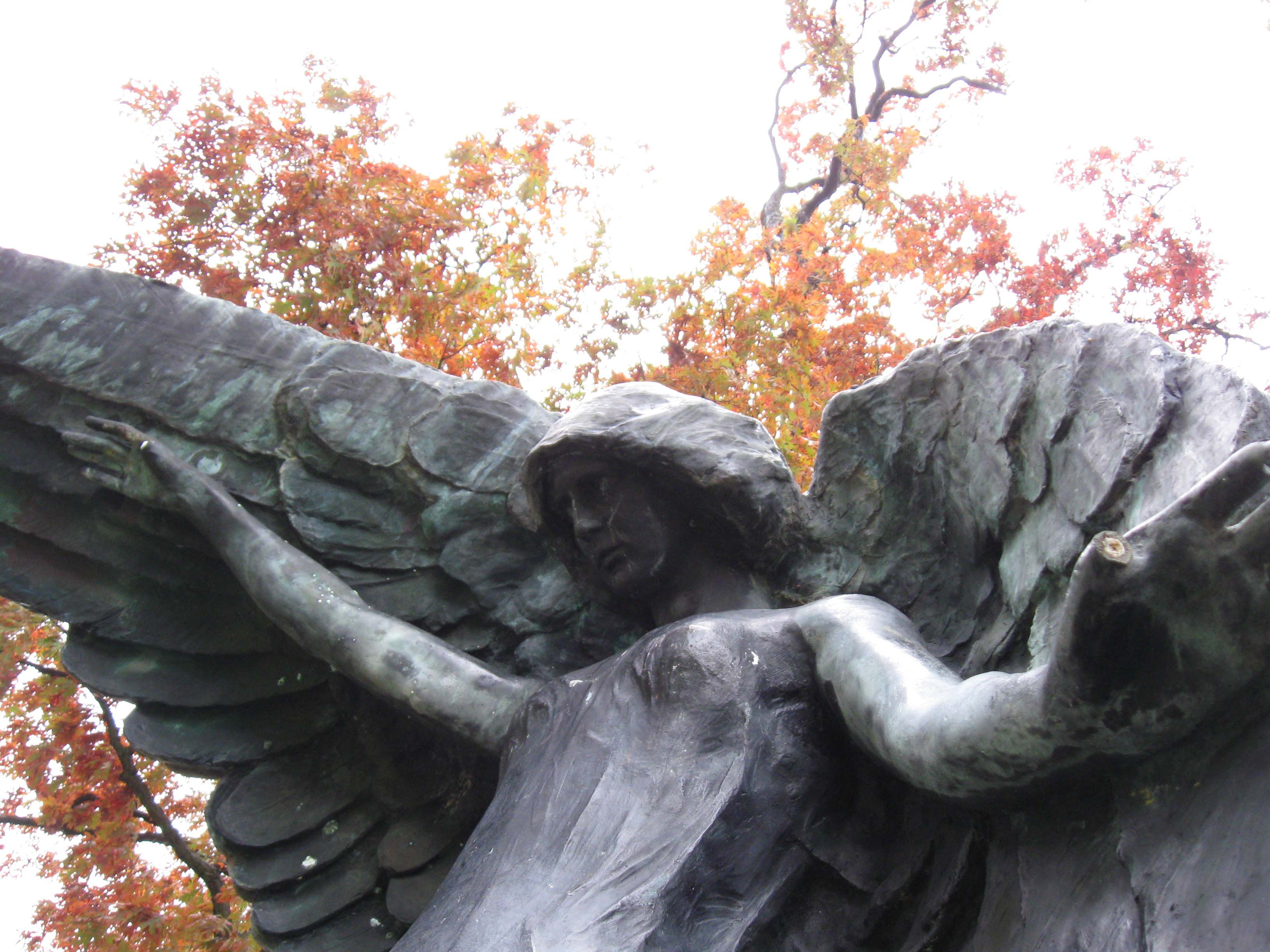
Black Angel, Oakland Cemetery, Iowa City.

A locally famous monument, the 8.5-foot (2.6 m) tall "Black Angel" statue by Mario Korbel was erected in 1913 as a memorial to Nicholas Feldevert.

The story of the Black Angel dates back to the late 19th century when Teresa Feldevert (née Karásková) moved to Iowa City from Bohemia (now in the Czech Republic). Her first marriage produced her son, Edward Dolezal, who died in Iowa City in 1891. Teresa had the bronze angel statue made in Chicago by Czech-American sculptor Mario Korbel and transported to Iowa City to be placed in the cemetery in 1915. Her second husband, Nicholas Feldevert’s ashes were placed in a repository at the base of the statue. When Teresa died in 1924, her ashes were placed beside her husband’s. Though the monument displays Teresa’s birthdate, there is no sign of her death date. Over the years the bronze statue oxidized, acquiring a greenish-black patina.

Many students and surrounding residents of Iowa City visit the statue. The biggest night of attraction is Halloween where students and residents gather around the statue; some test their luck by touching or kissing the statue. It is said that if one touches or kisses the statue they will be struck dead unless that person is a virgin. It is also rumored that if a pregnant woman walks beneath the statue’s stretched wings that she will miscarry. Vandals have damaged the statue, removing several fingers.

The Black Angel appears in W.P. Kinsella's 1986 novel The Iowa Baseball Confederacy, where the statue plays right field for the Confederacy.

The Black Angel also makes an appearance in Andrea Lawlor's 2017 novel Paul Takes the Form of a Mortal Girl, in which the titular Paul seduces a graduate student under its wings.

In 2013, the Black Angel was planned to be featured in an independent paranormal feature film. Footage of the Black Angel is included in the music video for "Alive Twice" by the band Friendship.

== Notable graves ==
- Isaac Augustus Wetherby, American painter and photographer
- Robert Lucas, Governor of Ohio and First Territorial Governor of Iowa
- Samuel J. Kirkwood, Civil War Governor of Iowa and U.S. Senator
- Eleanor Hoyt Brainerd, novelist
- Virgil Hancher, 13th president of the University of Iowa
- Irving Weber, Iowa City historian
- Mauricio Lasansky, artist
- Abel Beach, poet and a founder of the international fraternity Theta Delta Chi
- Bobbie Battista, CNN anchor and journalist
