= Allium rhizomatum =

Scientific classification
- Kingdom: Plantae
- Clade: Tracheophytes
- Clade: Angiosperms
- Clade: Monocots
- Order: Asparagales
- Family: Amaryllidaceae
- Subfamily: Allioideae
- Genus: Allium
- Species: A. rhizomatum

Binomial name
- Allium rhizomatum Wooton & Standl.

Species of plant

Allium rhizomatum is a species of plant native to southern Arizona (Cochise and Santa Cruz Counties), southern New Mexico (Catron, Grant, Hidalgo, Socorro, Sierra and Eddy Counties) and western Texas (Brewster and Jeff Davis Counties) in the United States, and Chihuahua in Mexico. It is generally found in dry, grassy areas at elevations of 1200–2200 m. Its common names include spreading wild onion and red flower onion.

Allium rhizomatum spreads by means of underground rhizomes, with new bulbs forming as much as 3 cm away from the parent plant. Bulbs are narrowly ellipsoid, up to 3 cm long but rarely more than 1 cm across. Flowers are up to 10 mm across; tepals white with red central veins, without glands; ovary oblong to elongate, lacking a crest; anthers yellow or pink; pollen yellow or white.

Some authors have considered A. rhizomatum to be the same species as A. glandulosum found in central and southern Mexico, but this latter species has deep red flowers, a rounded ovary and glands on the sepals.
