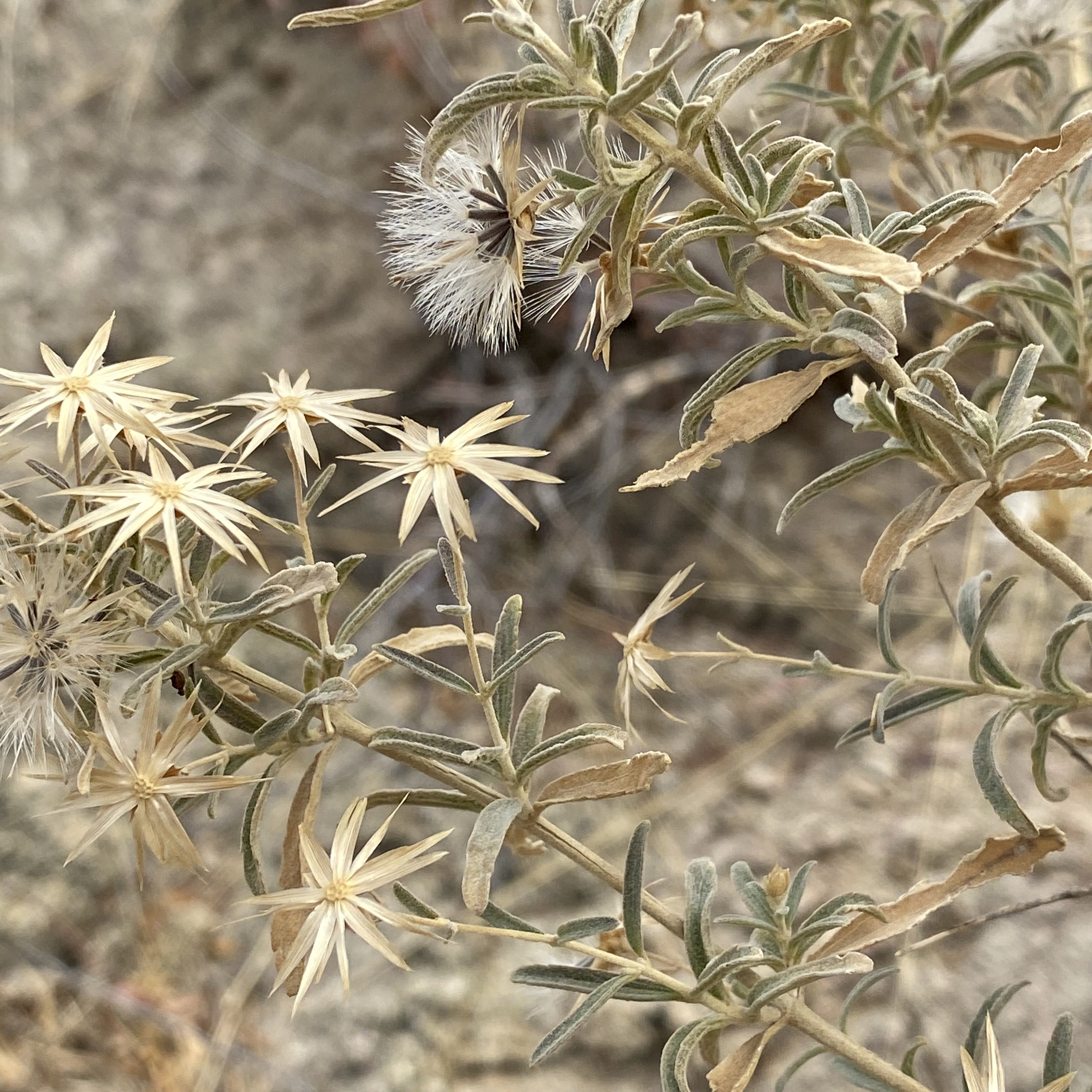

Scientific classification
- Kingdom: Plantae
- Clade: Tracheophytes
- Clade: Angiosperms
- Clade: Eudicots
- Clade: Asterids
- Order: Asterales
- Family: Asteraceae
- Genus: Brickellia
- Species: B. venosa

Binomial name
- Brickellia venosa (Wooton & Standl.) B.L.Rob.

Synonyms
- Coleosanthus venosus Wooton & Standl.

= Brickellia venosa =

Species of flowering plant

Brickellia venosa, the veiny brickellbush, is a North American species of flowering plant in the family Asteraceae. It is native to northern Mexico (Chihuahua, Sonora) and the southwestern United States (New Mexico, Arizona, far western Texas (El Paso County).

Brickellia venosa is a branching shrub up to 80 cm (32 inches) tall, growing from a woody caudex. It produces many small flower heads with yellow disc florets but no ray florets.
