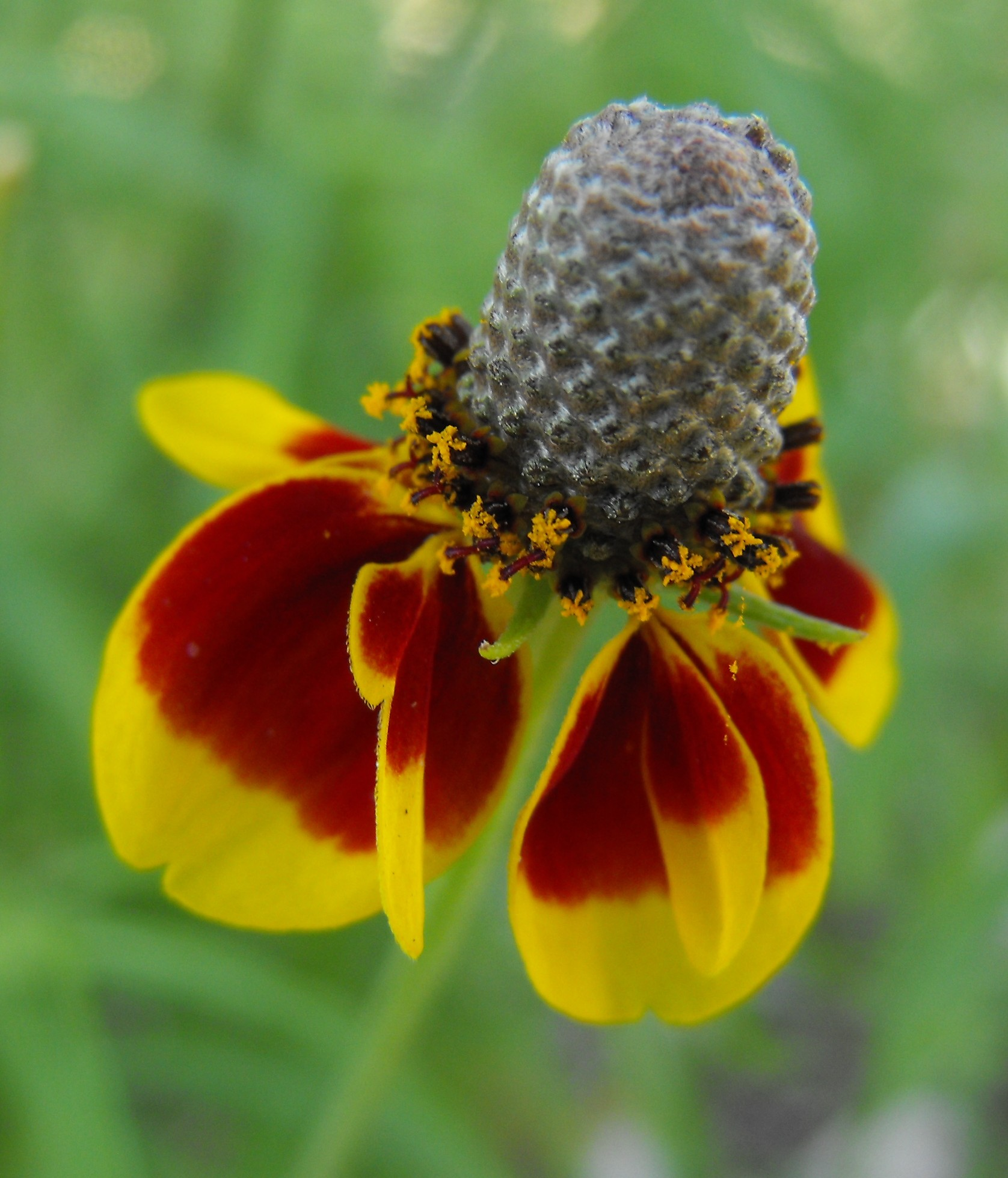

Conservation status
- Secure (NatureServe)

Scientific classification
- Kingdom: Plantae
- Clade: Tracheophytes
- Clade: Angiosperms
- Clade: Eudicots
- Clade: Asterids
- Order: Asterales
- Family: Asteraceae
- Genus: Ratibida
- Species: R. columnifera

Binomial name
- Ratibida columnifera (Nutt.) Wooton & Standl.

Synonyms
- Ratibida columnaris (Pursh) D.Don; Rudbeckia columnaris Pursh; Rudbeckia columnifera Nutt.

= Ratibida columnifera =

Species of flowering plant

Ratibida columnifera, commonly known as upright prairie coneflower, rocketflower, Mexican hat, and longhead prairie coneflower, is a perennial species of flowering plant in the genus Ratibida in the family Asteraceae. It is native to much of North America and inhabits prairies, plains, roadsides, and disturbed areas.

== Description ==
R. columnifera has medium green, hairy stems that branch occasionally, growing to 30–91 cm (1–3 ft) tall. Leaves are also hairy and are deeply pinnate with 5 to 11 lobes. They are alternate and measure up to 15 cm (6 in) long and 5 cm (2 in) across. The petioles are up to 5 cm (2 in) long.

The inflorescence at the top of the stem consists of 4 to 12 drooping, sterile ray florets that are yellow, brownish red, or brown with yellow borders, surrounding a central column which is up to 5 cm (2 in) long. The column is made up of numerous purplish disk florets, which open in bands starting at the base of the column and moving upwards. Flowers appear June to September.

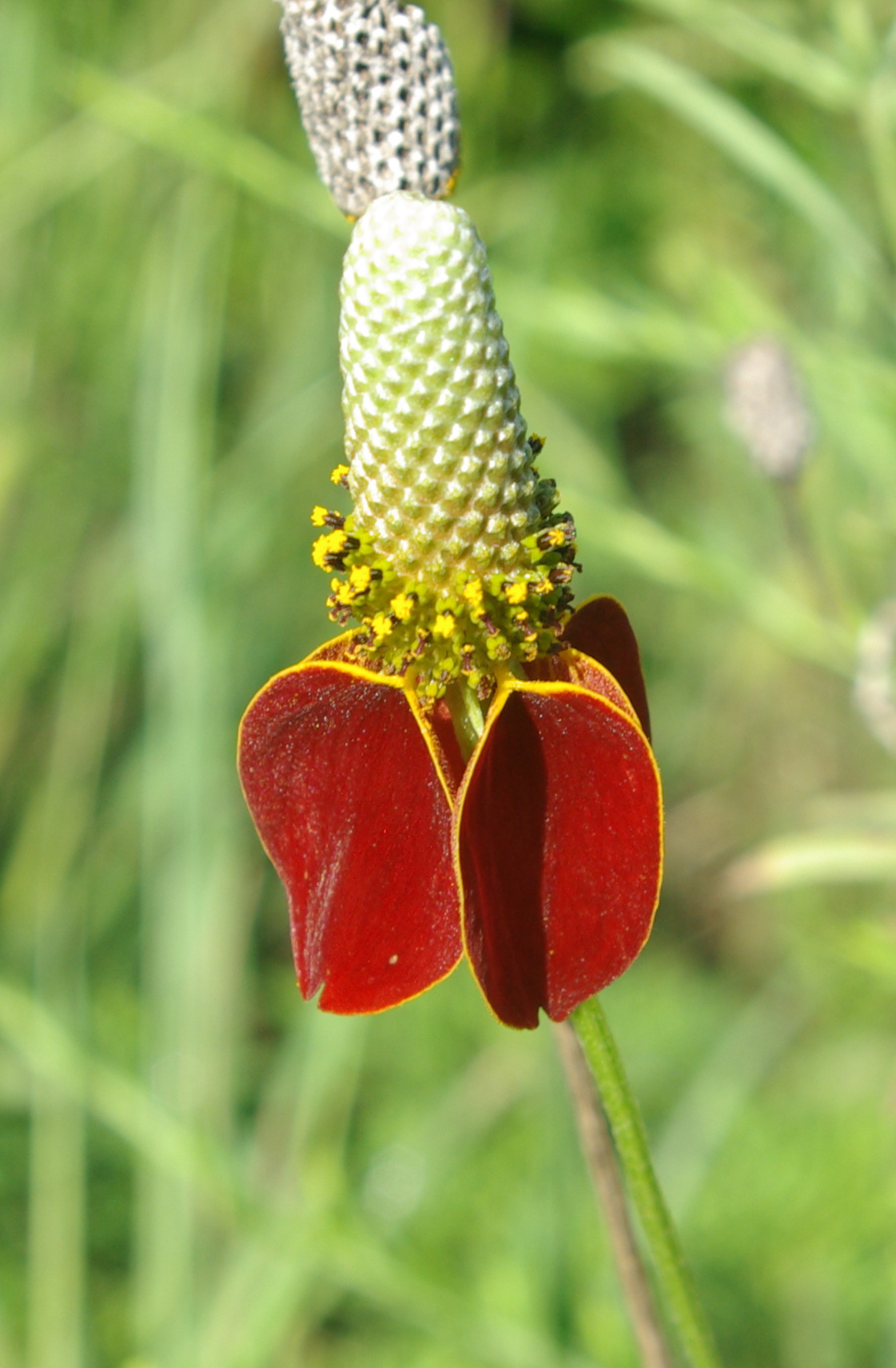
In bloom

=== Similar species ===
It is similar to Ratibida tagetes, but the leaves of R. tagetes are closer to the flower, while the leaves of R. columnifera are further below on the stem.

== Distribution and habitat ==
R. columnifera is native from southern Canada to northern Mexico. In Canada, it is native in Alberta, British Columbia, Saskatchewan, and Manitoba. In the United States, it is native as far as Idaho to the west and north, Texas to the south, and Massachusetts to the east. Habitats include sunny sites with well-drained soil, such as upland prairies, pastures, roadsides, and open disturbed areas.

== Uses ==
The Zuni people use an infusion of the whole plant as an emetic.

=== Cultivation ===
Prairie coneflower is valued by gardeners for xeriscaping and native plant gardens for its color and rich fragrance. Grown in garden settings plants are often biennial, growing the first year and dying after blooming in the second year. The prairie coneflower requires dry to medium soil moisture and rarely has serious disease or pest problems. It is hardy in USDA zones 4–9.
