= Brickellia chenopodina =

Scientific classification
- Kingdom: Plantae
- Clade: Tracheophytes
- Clade: Angiosperms
- Clade: Eudicots
- Clade: Asterids
- Order: Asterales
- Family: Asteraceae
- Genus: Brickellia
- Species: B. chenopodina

Binomial name
- Brickellia chenopodina (Greene ex Wooton & Standl.) B.L.Rob.

Synonyms
- Coleosanthus chenopodinus Greene ex Wooton & Standl.

Species of flowering plant

Brickellia chenopodina, the chenopod brickellbush, is a North American species of flowering plants in the family Asteraceae. It is native to Grant County in New Mexico.
