= Ralston Creek =

Ralston Creek may refer to:

- Ralston Creek (Colorado)
- Ralston Creek (Iowa)
