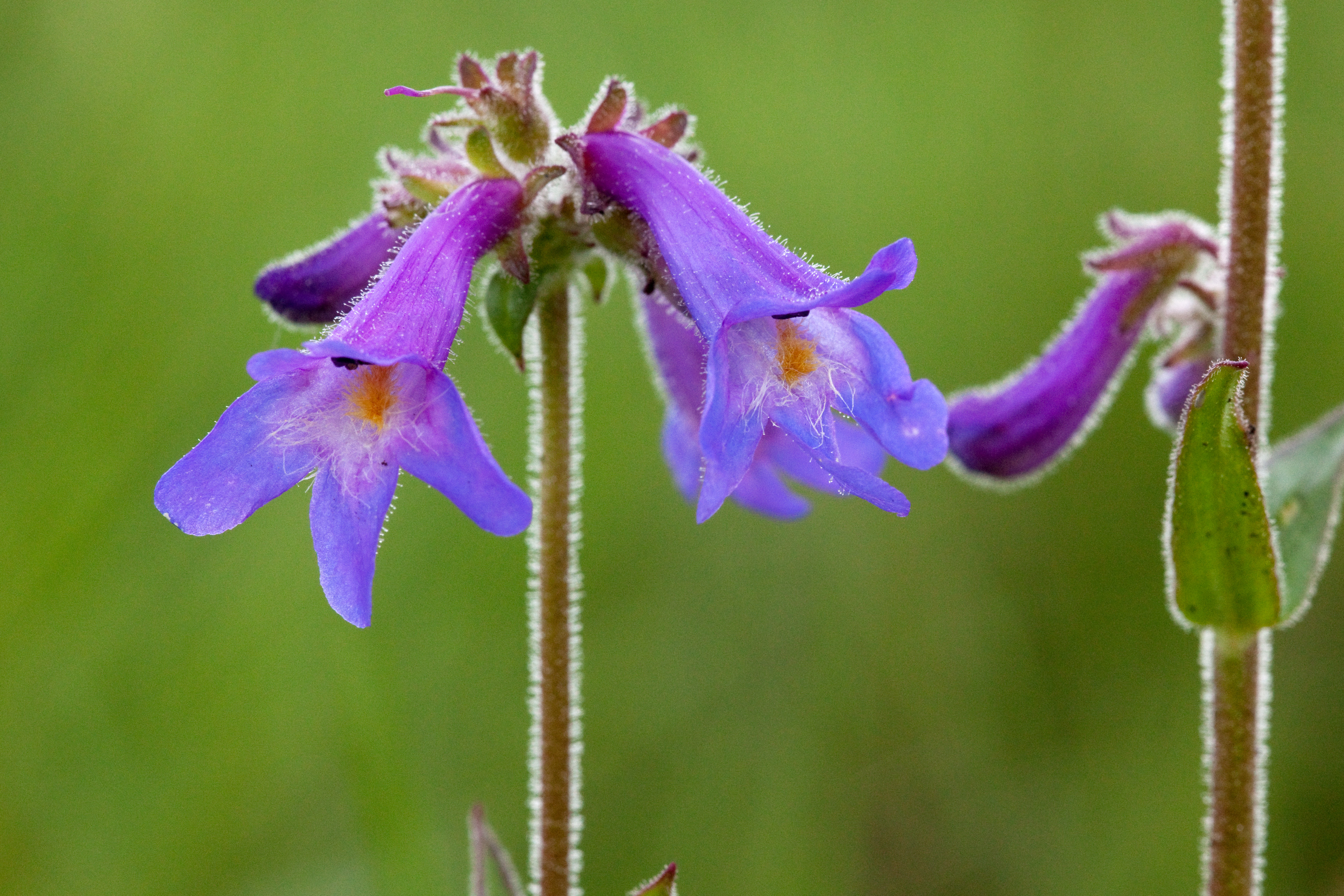

Conservation status
- Vulnerable (NatureServe)

Scientific classification
- Kingdom: Plantae
- Clade: Tracheophytes
- Clade: Angiosperms
- Clade: Eudicots
- Clade: Asterids
- Order: Lamiales
- Family: Plantaginaceae
- Genus: Penstemon
- Species: P. oliganthus

Binomial name
- Penstemon oliganthus Wooton & Standl.

Synonyms
- Penstemon pseudoparvus

= Penstemon oliganthus =

Plant species in the veronica family

Penstemon oliganthus, the Apache penstemon or tubtop penstemon, is a species from Arizona and New Mexico in the Southwestern United States.

== Description ==
Apache penstemons are a herbaceous plant that grows flowering stems that can be 6 to 45 centimeters (2.5–17.5 in) at maturity, but are usually at least 10 cm (4 in) tall. The stems are covered in backwards pointing hairs on their lower parts and glandular hairs towards the top.

It has both basal leaves and ones attached to its flowering stems. The basal leaves are wider, with a range of shapes from ovate, elliptic, or lanceolate all possible as well as having either sharp or blunt ends. The basal leaves are still present when the plant is in bloom. The stem leaves are attached in pairs and are shorter than the stem between the attachment points. They are lanceolate to linear, resembling a grass blade. The basal leaves and the lowest stem leaves are 1.5–7.5 cm long and 0.2–1.9 cm wide. None of the leaves are leathery and those near the base of the plant are normally hairy along their lower midveins and edges while nearly hairless towards the ends.

The flowering season can commence as early as June or occur as late as October in its native habitat, but usually not after the month of August. The bottom of the flower's tube is white contrasting with the blue to blue-violet of the top and lobes of the fused petals. The lower three lobes spread widely and jut forward. They are attached by long flower stalks and often droop downward. The flowers are attached to the main stem in two to seven widely space groups. Each group will have one or two points of attachment with one to four flowers.

== Taxonomy ==
Penstemon oliganthus was scientifically described and named in 1913 by E. O. Wooton and Paul Carpenter Standley. Wooton collected the type specimen of the plant 1 August 1892 in mountains west of Grants Station, New Mexico. It is a part of the genus Penstemon; which is classified in the Plantaginaceae family. When reviewing the plants of the genus for the Flora of North America the botanist Craig C. Freeman concluded that that the species Penstemon pseudoparvus, described by Frank Samuel Crosswhite in 1965, is identical to Penstemon oliganthus. However, as of 2026 Plants of the World Online continues to list P. pseudoparvus as an accepted species as does the Natural Resources Conservation Service.

=== Names ===
Penstemon oliganthus is known by the common names Apache penstemon, Apache beardtongue, and tubtop penstemon.

== Range and habitat ==
Apache penstemon is native to New Mexico and Arizona. In Arizona it is recorded on the Mogollon Rim and the White Mountains in Coconino, Apache, and Greenlee counties. In New Mexico it is more widespread, with populations growing in seven counties in the northwest to north-central parts of the state, in the Jemez Mountains and both the Cibola San Mateo Mountains and the Socorro San Mateo Mountains. It grows at elevations of 2,400 meters (7,900 ft) to as high as 3,500 meters (11,500 ft).

The species grows in mountain meadows and clearings in the pine or spruce forests, as well as in the ciénagas, alkaline wet meadows in valley bottoms.

== See also ==
- List of Penstemon species
