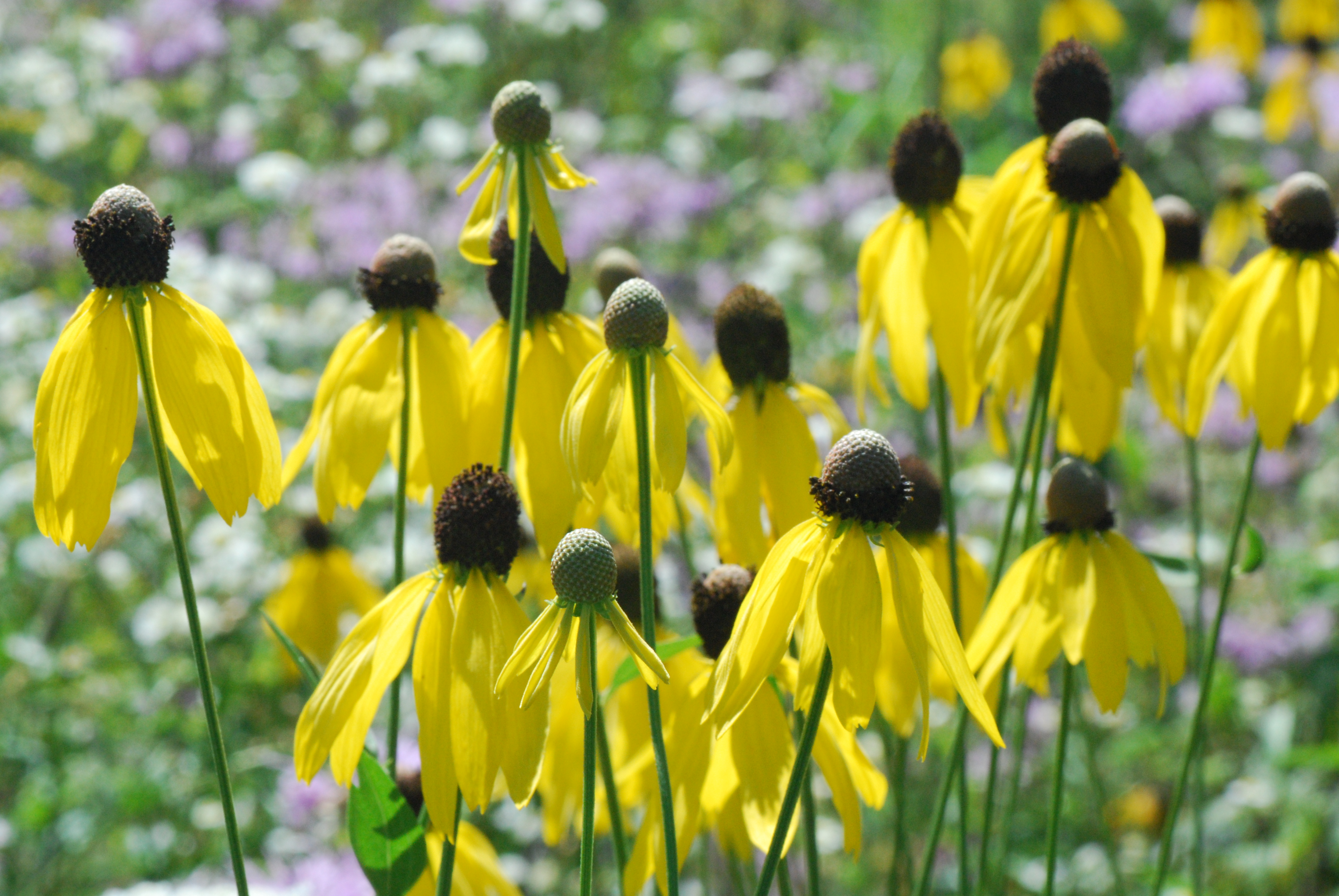

Conservation status
- Secure (NatureServe)

Scientific classification
- Kingdom: Plantae
- Clade: Tracheophytes
- Clade: Angiosperms
- Clade: Eudicots
- Clade: Asterids
- Order: Asterales
- Family: Asteraceae
- Genus: Ratibida
- Species: R. pinnata

Binomial name
- Ratibida pinnata (Vent.) Barnhart

= Ratibida pinnata =

Species of flowering plant

Ratibida pinnata is a species of flowering plant in the family Asteraceae known by the common names pinnate prairie coneflower, gray-head coneflower, yellow coneflower, and prairie coneflower. It is native to the central and eastern United States and Ontario in Canada.

This species is a perennial herb which can well exceed 1 meter (3 ft 3 in) in height. It has fibrous roots and rhizomes or woody caudices. The rough-haired, glandular leaves are up to 40 cm (16 in) long and are divided into several large lance-shaped or oval lobes. The inflorescences are tall, generally far above the highest leaves. Each flower head contains up to 15 yellow ray florets up to 6 cm (2 1/4 in) long. The center of the flower is globular or oval in shape and measures up to 2.5 cm (1 in) long. It is covered in up to 200 or more disc florets which are yellow-green to purplish in color. The disc heads have a scent reminiscent of anise when crushed.

This plant grows in prairies, on the margins of woods, and on roadsides. It can grow in moist or dry habitat. It is hardy and not easily outcompeted by other plants.

This plant is grown as an ornamental garden plant. It is attractive to butterflies and birds. Cultivars include 'Sunglow'.
