= Abel Beach =

American poet (1829–1899)

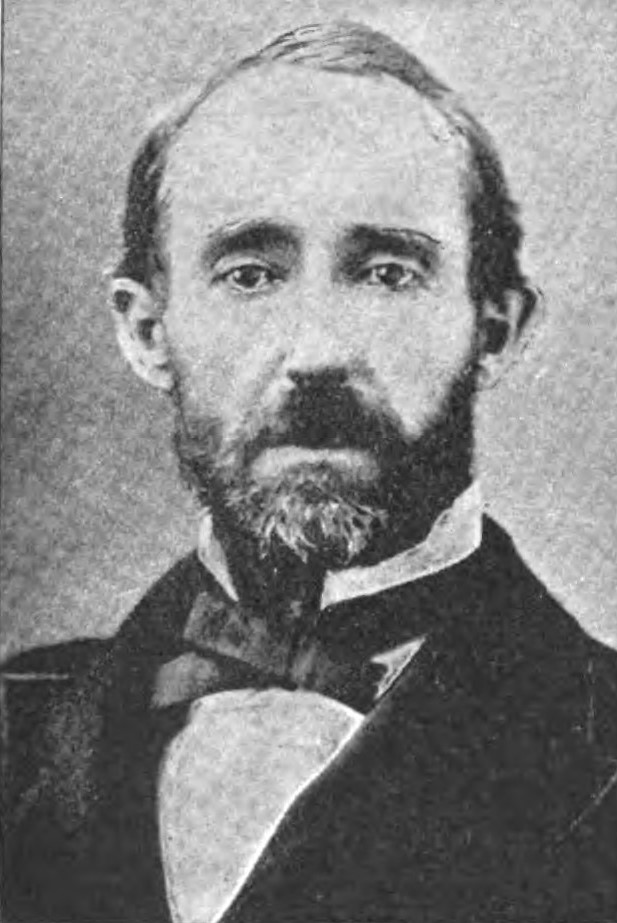
- Born: February 7, 1829; Groton, New York, U.S.
- Died: June 19, 1899 (aged 70); Iowa City, Iowa, U.S.
- Education: Union College
- Writing career
- Genre: Poetry

Abel Beach (February 7, 1829 – June 19, 1899) was an American poet, attorney, state auditor, and college professor. He was one of the six founders of the international fraternity Theta Delta Chi.

== Early life ==
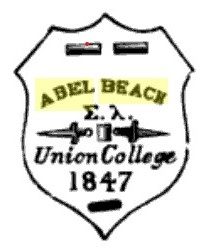
Woodblock print of the back side of Beach's Theta Delta Chi badge

Beach was born in Groton, New York in 1829. In 1846, he enrolled in Union College in Schenectady, New York his sophomore year. His classmates at Union included Chester A. Aurthur and Daniel Butterfield.

While at Union, he was a founder of Theta Delta Chi fraternity in 1847. He also helped designed the fraternity's badge and wrote its motto. In what should have been his senior year, he taught school. However, he returned to Union and graduated in 1849. He tied for first place in his class and was elected to Phi Beta Kappa.

== Career ==
After graduating from college, he taught school at the Ithaca Academy in Ithaca, New York. He then taught school in Virginia and at the Westfield Academy in New York. However, he left teaching after contracting a bronchial infection. In Buffalo, New York, Beach studied law with Messrs. Marvin Bros. He was admitted to the Bar and practice law in Ithaca, New York.

He moved to Iowa in 1854 where his health recovered. He became of professor and chair of Ancient Languages (Greek and Latin) at the University of Iowa in Iowa City, Iowa. He was one of three faculty members for what was then called the Mechanics Academy in the spring 1855 term. His appointment was approved by the board on March 15, 1855, and his pay was $130 for the seven weeks of the term. However, he resigned his position in 1857 after the return of his health condition.

He was the assistant Iowa Auditor of State under Republican John Patte, starting on December 3, 1855. The state capital of Iowa moved from Iowa City to Des Moines in 1857, necessitating Beach's move to Des Moines. Although his term did not end until December 1858, he resigned in March 1858 and returned to farming on his property near Iowa City

Corn was one of the crops he grew on his farm; in 1860, he had the best bushel of yellow corn at the fair. He left the farm for Iowa City where he pursued various businesses. Beach was the private secretary of Iowa's Governor Samuel J. Kirkwood sometime during his 1860 to 1864 term. He became the editor of the morning newspaper in Keokuk, Iowa; however, working an overnight schedule hurt his health. In 1864, he received a U.S. Patent for an automatic cistern regulator. Later, he received a patent for a writing tablet.

Around 1865, he started a book and stationery mercantile, Beach & Allin, with R. A. Allin. When Beach & Allin when out of business, he became an insurance and pension attorney in Iowa City. In the 1890s, he held former soldiers and their families secure pensions and completed pension paperwork. His clients were veterans of the Civil War, the American Indian Wars, and the Mexican–American War. He was also affiliated with the Bureau of Pensions.

== Poetry ==
Beach was a poet whose work was published in regional periodicals and two volumes. He wrote and recited poems for special events, such as the Johnson County Pioneers' Gala Day in 1892 where, according to the local newspaper, his recitation was "thrilling". However, a review of one of poetry collections noted, "Eager as we were to find real poetry in his Western Airs, our laborious research proved unavailing...." A modern author, Clarence Andrews, consider's Beach's poetry to be "sentimental and ordinary".

Beach also contributed articles and prose that were published in various newspapers. One of his essays, "Modern Architecture: A Plea for the Establishment of a Purely American School", was published in the Chicago Journal in 1888 and reprinted by newspapers in the midwest.

== Personal life ==
Shortly after graduating from college, Beach contracted a bronchial condition. Beach moved to Iowa City, Iowa in 1854 which hopes of improving his health. In 1856, Beach married Ellen, a former pupil and the daughter of Jesse Bowan who was the Adjutant General of Iowa and former member of the Indiana Senate and the Iowa Senate. They had three sons, two who survived to adulthood. The couple had a farm in Johnson County, near Iowa City, although they lived in Des Moines for several years during Beach's political career. They left the farm to live in Iowa City. However, by 1882, his wife lived in Washington, D.C. In May 1887, she petitioned for a divorce in that city.

Beach continued to be active in Theta Delta Chi, participating in the charter ceremonies for new chapters in various states, where he would read special poems that he wrote for the occasion. He delivered an address and was honored at the fraternity's 50th convention in New York City in 1898; at the time, he was one of its two surviving founders. He was a founding director of The Citizens' State Bank in Havensville, Kansas. He was also active in the Methodist Episcopal Church.

Beach's health declined in his later years. He died in his sleep in a boarding house room on East Washington Street in Iowa City on June 19, 1899.

== Publications ==
=== Poetry books ===
- Western Airs: Choice Selections from the Miscellaneous Poems (Buffalo: The Peter Paul Book Company, 1895)
- P.S. The Mysteries of Life and Other Late Poems: Supplemental to Western Airs. Iowa City, Iowa: [s.n.], 1897

=== Poetry anthologies ===
- Local and National Poets of America: With Biographical Sketches and Choice Selections from Over One Thousand Living American Poets. Thomas William Herringshaw, ed. (1890). Chicago: American Publishers' Association, 1890.
- Poets and Poetry of Iowa. Thomas William Herringshaw, editor. Chicago, American Publishers' Association, 1894.
