= Caveman Wakes Up =

Studio album by Friendship
- Released: May 16, 2025
- Studios: Uniform Recording, Philadelphia
- Genre: Indie rock
- Length: 45:54
- Label: Merge

Friendship chronology
Love the Stranger (2022)	Caveman Wakes Up (2025)

Singles from Caveman Wakes Up
- 1. "Free Association" Released: February 19, 2025

Caveman Wakes Up is the fifth studio album by American indie rock band Friendship. It was released on May 16, 2025, by Merge Records.

== Background ==
Consisting of eleven songs ranging between two and six minutes each with a total runtime of approximately forty-five minutes, Caveman Wakes Up was described as an indie rock album. It succeeds the band's 2022 album, Love the Stranger, and it was recorded in Uniform Recording in Philadelphia. "Free Association" was released as the album's lead single on February 19, 2025, with a music video directed by Zach Puls.

== Reception ==
Professional ratings
Review scores
Source	Rating
AllMusic	4/5 stars
New Noise	2.5/5 stars
Paste	7.0/10
Pitchfork	7.7/10
Spill Magazine	4.5/5 stars
Under the Radar	6.5/10

Spill Magazine gave Caveman Wakes Up a rating of four and a half. It described the album as exemplifying "in full and all in flying, somewhat darkly tinged colors."

AllMusic referred to it as a "deceptively artful examination of, and expression of, depression." Paste gave it a rating of 7.0 out of ten, calling it "a record on the precipice of a breakthrough, but the inconsistent, patchworked tone and thematic material show the band still has some refining to do." Under the Radar assigned the album a rating of 6.5 out of ten and remarked, "In part, Caveman Wakes Up comes down to how you like your cup of reality served. Black and bitter or with a dash of restraint."

Stereogum designated the album as its "Album of the Week" and remarked, "It's one of the most assured indie rock albums in recent memory, the sound of a brilliant writer coming into his own and a band honing in on the ideal aesthetic complement for his songs, imbuing his quiet indignities with a plaintive grace." New Noise rated the album two and a half out of five, stating "Caveman Wakes Up resides in an open landscape, green pastures with limitless possibilities despite heavy hearts taking over its narrations."

== Track listing ==
Caveman Wakes Up track listing
No.	Title	Length
1.	"Salvage Title"	2:48
2.	"Tree of Heaven"	4:37
3.	"Betty Ford"	4:25
4.	"Free Association"	4:35
5.	"Hollow Skulls"	4:53
6.	"Artex"	3:08
7.	"Love Vape"	3:34
8.	"Wildwood in January"	4:30
9.	"Resident Evil"	4:13
10.	"All Over the World"	5:05
11.	"Fantasia"	4:06
Total length:		45:54

== Personnel ==
Credits adapted from Bandcamp.

=== Friendship ===
- Peter Gill – guitar, synthesizer, vibraphone, vocals, production
- Michael Cormier-O'Leary – drums, percussion, piano, organ, synthesizer, vibraphone, drum machine, string and woodwind arrangement, production
- Jon Samuels – bass, synthesizer, production
- Dan Wriggins – vocals, guitar, production

=== Additional contributors ===
- Adelyn Strei – flute, clarinet
- Jason Calhoun – violin
- Jeff Zeigler – recording
- Bradford Krieger – additional recording
- Lucas Knapp – additional recording, mixing
- Matthew Barnhart – mastering
- Matthew Reed – cover art
- Daniel Murphy – design
