= Theta Delta Chi =

American collegiate social fraternity

- ΘΔΧ
- Founded: October 31, 1847; 178 years ago Union College
- Type: Social
- Affiliation: NIC
- Status: Active
- Scope: North America
- Motto: "A small, intimate, diverse brotherhood focused on scholarship, leadership, and responsible social life."
- Slogan: Our Hearts are United
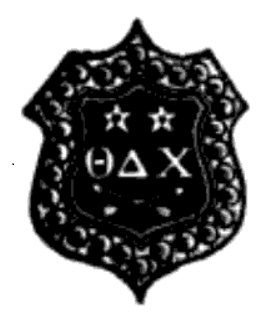
- Member badge
- Colors: Black, White, and Blue
- Flag
- Flower: Red carnation
- Jewel: Ruby
- Patron Roman deity: Minerva (Note: Named as Minerva as early as 1873 according to the Membership Handbook (2010), p.42, this deity's name would be Athena in the Greek language.)
- Publication: The Shield
- Chapters: 29 active 69 total chartered
- Nicknames: TDX, TDC, Thete, Theta Delt, Thumpers
- Headquarters: 214 Lewis Wharf; Boston, Massachusetts 02110; United States
- Website: thetadeltachi.net

Theta Delta Chi (ΘΔΧ) is a social fraternity that was founded in 1847 at Union College, New York, United States. While nicknames differ from institution to institution, the most common nicknames for the fraternity are TDX, TDC, Thete, Theta Delt, and Thumpers. Theta Delta Chi brothers refer to their local organizations as charges rather than using the common fraternity nomenclature of chapters.

== History ==
=== Origins and growth ===
Theta Delta Chi, the eleventh oldest of the college fraternities, was founded in 1847 at Union College in Schenectady, New York by six members of the class of 1849, including William G. Akin, Abel Beach, Theodore B. Brown, Andrew H. Green, William Hyslop, and Samuel F. Wile.

In the first minute book of the Alpha charge, taken in 1848, the names Jesse D. Fonda and Theodore J. Fonda were listed alongside the other six founders. The Fonda brothers seemed to be under the impression that they were founders and the existence of this record led to the mistaken belief that Theta Delta Chi was founded in 1848. On July 14, 1914, Andrew Green wrote a letter clarifying that the fraternity was founded in 1847, and that the Fonda brothers, upon the realization that they were not founding members, lost interest and disassociated from the society. Despite this, many early fraternity records incorrectly show 1848 as the founding year. In 1849, Green and Akin along with Francis Martindale (the first initiate), organized the Beta charge (later renamed Beta Proteron) at Ballston Law School. However, two years later the school itself moved and the new charge was disbanded and the members put on Alpha's rolls.

During the 1850s Theta Delta Chi spread rapidly, adding charges at Vermont (1852), Rensselaer Polytechnic Institute (1853), William and Mary (1853), Virginia (1857), Hobart (1857), Wesleyan (1857), Harvard (1856), Brown (1853), Bowdoin (1854), Kenyon (1854), Tufts (1856), Washington and Jefferson (1858), South Carolina (1859), and North Carolina (1856). Few of these remained active for long, although several were later revived.

During the 1860s new charges, at, among other institutions, Lafayette and Rochester (1867), Hamilton (1868), and Dartmouth (1869), continued to be chartered at a pace that kept slightly ahead of attrition caused by charges going inactive. The American Civil War, however, severely weakened most charges as men left for military service; many of the earliest charges went inactive during this period, and expansion in the South ceased for half a century.

Only after 1870 did Theta Delta Chi begin to acquire its present configuration. Westward expansion had traditionally been opposed by a large segment of the Fraternity, which worried that supervision and solidarity would suffer if Theta Delta Chi were to stray far from the East. The rise of the large state universities in the West, particularly in the Big Ten, eventually overcame that resistance and Michigan, Minnesota, and Wisconsin welcomed Theta Delta Chi between 1889 and 1895. Further Midwest expansion included Illinois (1908) and Iowa State (1919). Berkeley (1900), Stanford (1903), the University of Washington (1913) and UCLA (1929) brought Theta Delta Chi in strength to the Pacific coast.

Expansion in the East during the 1870s, 1880s and 1890s brought charges to Cornell, Boston University, Wabash, CCNY, Columbia, Lehigh, Amherst, Yale, MIT, Williams, and George Washington. Pennsylvania (1915) was the last Eastern charge to become active before World War I, although 1904 and 1910 saw the reactivation of the Southern charges, with Epsilon at William and Mary and Nu at the University of Virginia.

Theta Delta Chi became an International Fraternity with charterings at McGill (1901) and Toronto (1912).

The Great Depression and the Second World War saw a number of charges go inactive and brought a halt to expansion. At its Centennial Convention in 1947, Theta Delta Chi stood at 28 charges, a number that would begin to increase only in the 1950s.

=== Institutional development ===
The institutions of the Fraternity slowly took shape during the late nineteenth and early twentieth centuries. In 1867 anti-fraternity sentiment at Union led to the disbanding of the Alpha. As the Mother charge, Alpha had exercised governing power over the Fraternity, but her demise, although temporary, brought about the creation of the Grand Lodge by action of the eight surviving charges at the Convention of 1868. The Grand Lodge, originally three, then five, and now seven officers (of whom two are undergraduates), remains the elected governing body of the Fraternity to this day (Alpha was rechartered in 1923, although executive power has remained with the Grand Lodge).

The annual Convention has evolved into a major international assembling of Theta Delts at which all charges are represented by undergraduate and graduate delegates and at which the major business of the Fraternity is transacted.

The 1881 Convention required that the President of the Grand Lodge visit every charge once a year; Central Fraternity Office staff now performs these duties. In 1869, the first issue of The Shield was produced, qualifying it as the oldest fraternity magazine. Although it lapsed after one issue, The Shield was revived in 1884 and has been published continually since then.

The Central Fraternity Office, or CFO, evolved over many decades from a virtually one-man job, filled by a Grand Lodge member, and housed in the now defunct Theta Delta Chi Club in New York City, to a professional staff consisting of an Executive Director, a Director of Development, a Director of charge Operations, a Director of Expansion, a Director of charge Development, a Systems Administrator and one or more undergraduate interns, referred to as Member Service Coordinators. The office currently operates from 214 Lewis Wharf in Boston, Massachusetts.

The financial health of Theta Delta Chi was ensured through the establishment of two entities, the Founders' Corporation in 1910 and the Educational Foundation in 1944. Any Theta Delt may join the Corporation on payment of $250 and thereby vote at its annual meetings. It also receives bequests and holds and invests all funds for the benefit of the Fraternity. The Educational Foundation, a 501 (c)(3) public charity, receives bequests and owns the property occupied by the CFO and other assets. It funds the educational activities of the Fraternity.

=== Modern expansion ===
Between 1951 and 1970 the fraternity added charges at Northwestern, Penn State, Arizona State, Rhode Island, Michigan State, Santa Barbara, Calgary, Virginia Tech, and Virginia Commonwealth University; Bucknell was rechartered also. Several of these charters brought into being some of the strongest charges in the fraternity, but in the increasingly uncertain climate of those times, with anti-fraternity sentiment gaining strength on a number of campuses, a significant number went inactive. The 1992 rechartering at Wabash continued a pattern of reviving inactive charges; new charters in the 1990s and 2000 include Northeastern, Nova Southeastern, UNC Greensboro, SUNY Albany and Merrimack. The Fort Lauderdale, FL and Greensboro, NC charges marked a significant re-entry into the South.

With the start of the new millennium, Theta Delta Chi has worked to revive several of its defunct charges, while installing charges on new campuses. The Chi charge, founded in 1867, and active for most of the time since then was re-chartered in the summer of 2002 at the 155th Annual Convention. Following a brief closure, the Epsilon charge returned to the active ranks in August 2004. Theta Delta Chi has also worked to increase its presence in the northeast with the installation of the Iota Triton at UMass Dartmouth in 2005.

Yet the active charge roll call remains in flux, as the fraternity has lost several charges, young and old, since 2001; losing Omicron Triton at URI (2001), Nu Deuteron at Lehigh (2004), Delta Triton at Northeastern (2005), Eta Triton at Nova Southeastern (2005), Mu Deuteron at Amherst (2006), and Rho Triton at VCU (2009). Following the chartering of the Theta Triton at Binghamton University in 2007, the fraternity chartered four charges in 2008; reviving the Epsilon Triton at Arizona State University and the Rho Proteron at the University of South Carolina, while chartering the Tau Triton at Marist College and the Lambda Triton at Rutgers University. In March 2009, the Gamma Deuteron at the University of Michigan returned to the active roles of the fraternity. In 2010 Psi Deuteron at UCLA was rechartered, as well as Xi at Hobart College. In 2011, Upsilon Triton at Indiana University was established. In 2016, Psi Tetraton was established at the University of Arizona. In 2018, Rho Triton at Virginia Commonwealth University was rechartered. In 2022, the Omicron Triton was rechartered, followed by Epsilon in 2024.

== Member misconduct ==
The charge at Rutgers University held an unauthorized party in December 2017 while subject to a cease and desist order from the university. A freshman student, Kenneth Patterson, attended the party and was later killed by an Amtrak train after stumbling onto the tracks while highly intoxicated. Patterson's family sued Rutgers University and Theta Delta Chi for wrongful death in December 2019.

As of December 20, 2021, UC Berkeley has removed the recognition of the Delta Deuteron charge in response to hazing allegations.

== See also ==
- List of social fraternities
