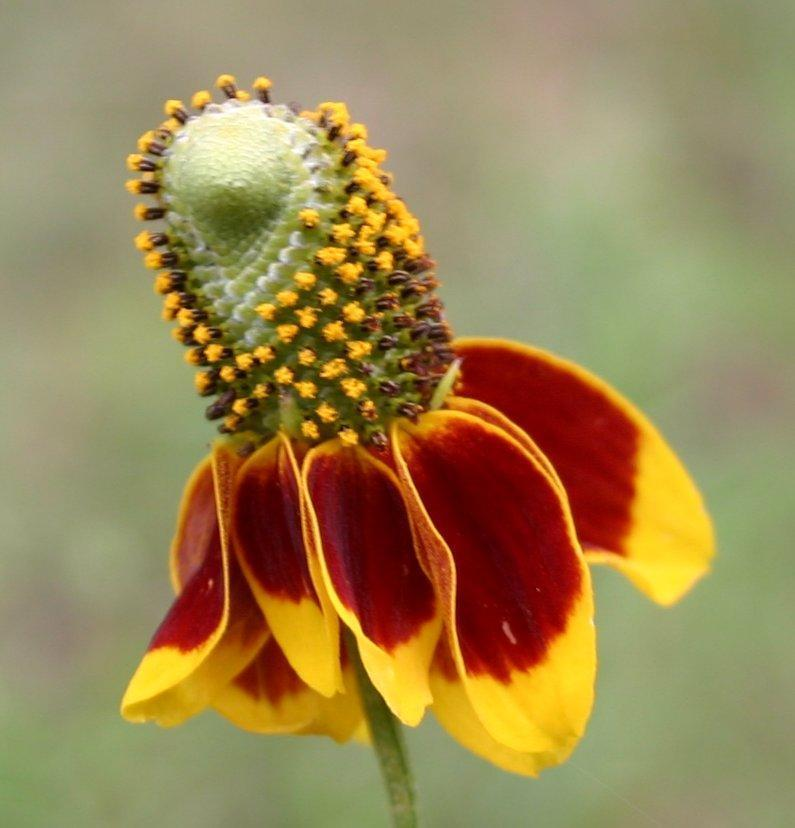
- Ratibida columnifera

Scientific classification
- Kingdom: Plantae
- Clade: Embryophytes
- Clade: Tracheophytes
- Clade: Spermatophytes
- Clade: Angiosperms
- Clade: Eudicots
- Clade: Asterids
- Order: Asterales
- Family: Asteraceae
- Subfamily: Asteroideae
- Tribe: Heliantheae
- Subtribe: Rudbeckiinae
- Genus: Ratibida; Raf.

Type species
- Ratibida sulcata Raf.

Synonyms
- Lepachys Raf.; Obeliscaria sect. Ratibida (Raf.) DC.; Obeliscaria sect. Lepachys (Raf.) DC.; Obelisteca Raf.; Obeliscaria Cass.

= Ratibida =

Prairie coneflowers

Genus of flowering plants

Ratibida is a genus of North American plants in the tribe Heliantheae within the family Asteraceae. Members of the genus are commonly known as prairie coneflowers or Mexican-hat.

== Species ==
There are 7 species:

- Ratibida coahuilensis B.L.Turner - Coahuila
- Ratibida columnifera (Nutt.) Wooton & Standl. – upright prairie coneflower - widespread in Canada, United States, and northeastern Mexico
- Ratibida latipalearis E.L.Richards - Chihuahua
- Ratibida mexicana (S.Watson) W.M.Sharp - Chihuahua, Coahuila, Sonora
- Ratibida peduncularis (Torr. & A.Gray) Barnhart – naked prairie coneflower - Louisiana, Texas
- Ratibida pinnata (Vent.) Barnhart – Grayhead or pinnate prairie coneflower - Ontario, eastern + central United States (primarily Great Lakes + Mississippi Valley)
- Ratibida tagetes (E.James) Barnhart – short-ray prairie coneflower - Chihuahua, United States (desert southwest, western Great Plains)
