= Love the Stranger =

Studio album by Friendship
- Released: July 29, 2022
- Studios: Big Nice Studio, Lincoln, Rhode Island
- Genre: Americana
- Length: 45:10
- Label: Merge
- Producers: Bradford Krieger, Friendship

Friendship chronology
Dreamin' (2019)	Love the Stranger (2022)	Caveman Wakes Up (2025)

Singles from Love the Stranger
- 1. "Ugly Little Victory" Released: April 20, 2022; 2. "Hank" Released: May 17, 2022; 3. "Alive Twice" Released: June 13, 2022; 4. "Chomp Chomp" Released: July 12, 2022

Love the Stranger is the fourth studio album by Philadelphia indie rock band Friendship, released July 29, 2022, by Merge Records, their debut with the label. The album was recorded at Big Nice Studio in Lincoln, Rhode Island, and produced by the band along with Bradford Krieger.

== Singles and music videos ==
Four singles were released ahead of the album: "Ugly Little Victory" on April 20, 2022, alongside the announcement of the band's signing with Merge; "Hank" on May 17, with the announcement of the album; "Alive Twice" on June 13; and "Chomp Chomp" on July 12.

"Hank" was released along with a music video directed by comedian Joe Pera. The video, "a characteristically Pera-esque slice of life" per Jack Meyer of Paste, follows a painter named Kaitlyn and a woodworker named Henry through "the rocky shores and spruce-speckled woods" of Little Cranberry Island, where frontman Dan Wriggins once worked as a lobster fisherman just off the coast of his native Maine. Henry is depicted constructing a church while Kaitlyn paints the shoreline. The video was edited by Grant Farsi and shot by Pera and Michael Kaplan. Per Pera, the video came from a brainstorming session with Wriggins and drummer Michael Cormier-O'Leary. Another video was released for "Alive Twice", also shot by Kaplan, which includes footage of the Black Angel at Iowa City's Oakland Cemetery.

== Style and reception ==
Love the Stranger ratings
Aggregate scores
Source	Rating
Metacritic	75/100
Review scores
Source	Rating
AllMusic	3.5/5 stars
The Arts Desk	3/5 stars
Mojo	4/5 stars
Paste	7.5/10
Pitchfork	7.0/10
Uncut	7/10

According to the review aggregator Metacritic, Love the Stranger received "generally favorable reviews" based on a weighted average score of 75 out of 100 from 5 critic scores. AllMusic's Marcy Donelson calls the album "typically low-key and rustic in nature, with touches of (mostly) atmospheric keyboards and electronics" but "further distinguished by the use of brief instrumentals that make up about one-third of its extensive track list". Opener "St. Bonaventure" places "[lead vocalist Dan] Wriggins' craggy, conversational delivery ... over lap steel, sparse guitars, simple bass and drums, and part-time vocal harmonies" which "sets the tone for much of a weary group of songs in the drudgery of the everyday, although it never quite stagnates." On the other hand, "lusher", "crunchier" "Ryde" "adopts the elemental percussion and minor intervals of a work song until it breaks open into an organ- and strings-accompanied version of heartland rock." Despite other diversions, such as the "rare extended-chord exploration" on "Love's" and "Kum & Go"'s incorporation of "Southwestern Europe-style guitar and accordion", by the album's end "it has never quite abandoned its back-porch feel or relentlessly existential point of view, closing on the words 'Down here in the greasy mess/Hoping for the best.'" The Arts Desk's Kieron Tyler says that on Love the Stranger, the band "deal in an unhurried Americana which is never far from familiar touchstones", such as "Mr. Chill" which contains "hints of the 1970 Gene Clark song "One in a Hundred" and "Green on Red-esque "Ryde" which "is as strident as it gets." Tyler closes by saying the album "defines its space with clarity", that world being one "where overstatement is anathema, where wonder is found no matter how much hurt has been dealt out."

Mojo's Andrew Male notes "a deceptive narrative simplicity" in the band's songs which "sound so much like diary entries, or texts from friends, that when they slide into poetry and profundity, which they do so regularly, they catch you completely unawares" creating a "disarming mood of nothing much going on [which is compounded by the lazy twilight-porch country sounds" of the band. The lyrics of "Hank" draw to mind comparisons to "the hushed Americana intimacies of Vic Chesnutt and Townes Van Zandt, and also the wry imagistic poetry of David Berman". Per Paste's Jack Meyer, the album "hits like a call out of the blue from an old friend, touching on the passage of time, its disappointments and humble victories, and the struggle to stay kind whether or not the world returns the favor", with an "Americana-tinged sound [which] serves as home base for the album, but doesn't keep the band from branching out." "Alive Twice" "creates a skeletal frame for itself out of synthesizer and piano, just barely holding together through the faintest of kickdrums until snapping into place right at the end", while "more full-throated tracks" like "Ramekin" and "Ryde" "bring some of Songs: Ohia's more anthemic moments to mind, taking the band into a louder space than they've explored before, with the force of their sound on the songs mirroring the tug-of-war between bitterness and gratitude that permeates the characters within them." While the album's "instrumentation can still feel a little cut and dried at times, it's often saved by flourishes tucked into the gaps where songs threaten to turn stale", such as the "playful" melodica on "Chomp Chomp", the "warm organ that brings "Ugly Little Victory" to a triumphant close", or the coda on "Hank" "sampling a chainsaw as it splits a guitar in half." Pitchfork's Ian Cohen writes that "as their debut on indie institution Merge, the mere existence of Love the Stranger is a stress test on Friendship's ethos, a 45-minute Big Moment", and that "if Friendship's previous album, Dreamin', was meant to reflect the rejuvenating power of that one beer in the fridge after a long day of work, Love the Stranger is Wriggins splitting a six pack of the good shit for a celebratory toast." The band "do not engage in world-building, instead calling greater attention to the world in which we're all just passing through" to the point where, "while always endearing, over the course of Love the Stranger, they can just as often feel constrained by a documentarian approach."

BrooklynVegan ranked Love the Stranger at number 50 on their Top 50 Albums of 2022 list.

== Track listing ==
All tracks are written by Dan Wriggins, Jon Samuels, Michael Cormier-O'Leary, and Peter Gill, except where noted.

Love the Stranger track listing
No.	Title	Writer(s)	Length
1.	"St. Bonaventure"		3:51
2.	"What's the Move"		2:49
3.	"Blue Canoe"		0:21
4.	"Hank"		4:22
5.	"Chomp Chomp"		3:53
6.	"Love's"	Cormier-O'Leary	0:55
7.	"No Way"		3:50
8.	"Alive Twice"		2:49
9.	"Quickchek"	Wriggins; Samuels	0:31
10.	"Ramekin"		3:39
11.	"Mr. Chill"		3:12
12.	"UDF"	Cormier-O'Leary	1:04
13.	"Ryde"		3:45
14.	"Season"		2:49
15.	"Kum & Go"	Cormier-O'Leary	0:44
16.	"Ugly Little Victory"		3:28
17.	"Smooth Pursuit"		3:08
Total length:			45:10

== Personnel ==
Friendship

- Peter Gill – guitar, pedal steel, keyboard, vocals, production
- Michael Cormier-O'Leary – drums, percussion, keyboard, piano, guitar, organ, vocals, production
- Jon Samuels – bass, programming, keyboard, organ, production
- Dan Wriggins – vocals, guitar, keyboard, melodica, organ, accordion, production

Additional personnel

- Bradford Krieger – production, mixing, engineering, additional vocals
- Patrick Klem – mastering
- Abby Black – vocal recording (track 2)
- Jess Shoman – vocals (2)
- Meghan Cormier-O'Leary – additional vocals
- Daniel Murphy – design
- Oliver Wasow – cover photo
- Evangeline Krajewski – inside photo
