= List of Theta Delta Chi charges =

A list of Charges of the Theta Delta Chi fraternity. Active chapters are in bold. Inactive chapters are in italics. The Fraternity refers to its campus units as "charges" rather than the more common term, "chapters".

Charge	Charter date and range	Institution	Location	Status	Ref.
**Alpha**	October 31, 1847 – 1867; February 17, 1923	Union College	Schenectady, New York	Active	(Note: Restored in 1923 with absorption of the school's Commons Club, which had originated in 1909.)
Beta Proteron	1849–1851	Ballston Law College	Ballston Spa, New York	Inactive	(Note: Ballston Law College closed in the 1860s. It was first situated in Ballston Spa, NY, but had moved to Poughkeepsie, NY in 1853.)
Gamma	1852 – 1857; 1990 – 1995	University of Vermont	Burlington, Vermont	Inactive	
Delta	1853 – 1871; 1883 – 1896	Rensselaer Polytechnic Institute	Troy, New York	Inactive	
**Epsilon**	1853 – 1861; 1871 – 1872; 1904 – 2012; January 27, 2024	College of William & Mary	Williamsburg, Virginia	Active	(Note: At its 1904 revival, the chapter absorbed Mu Pi Lambda (local), which had originated in 1899.)
Zeta	1853 – 1877; 1887 – 1971; 1975 – 2016	Brown University	Providence, Rhode Island	Inactive	(Note: The chapter originated in 1852 as the Kappa chapter of St. Anthony Hall, the common name for Delta Psi. A year after its establishment it withdrew to join Theta Delta Chi.)
Eta	1854 – 1863; 1872 – 1999	Bowdoin College	Brunswick, Maine	Inactive	
Theta	1854 – 1861; 1870 – 1898	Kenyon College	Gambier, Ohio	Inactive	
Iota	1856 – 1861; 1885 – 1889; 1892 – 1916; 2005 – 2009	Harvard University	Cambridge, Massachusetts	Inactive	
Kappa	1856 – 2017	Tufts University	Medford and Somerville, Massachusetts	Inactive	
Lambda Graduate	1856 – 1857		Manhattan, New York	Inactive	
Mu	1856 – 1860	University of North Carolina at Chapel Hill	Chapel Hill, North Carolina	Inactive	
**Nu**	1857 – 1860; 1873 – 1881; June 11, 1910	University of Virginia	Charlottesville, Virginia	Active	(Note: The chapter was restored in 1910 by absorption of the Rotunda Club (local), which had been established in 1906.)
**Xi**	June 29, 1857 – 1996; January 22, 2011	Hobart and William Smith Colleges	Geneva, New York	Active	
Omicron	1857 – 1863	Wesleyan University	Middletown, Connecticut	Inactive	
Pi	1858 – 1872	Washington & Jefferson College	Washington, Pennsylvania	Inactive	
**Rho Proteron**	1859 – 1861; February 29, 2008	University of South Carolina	Columbia, South Carolina	Active	
Sigma	1861 – 1876; 1881 – 1896	Dickinson College	Carlisle, Pennsylvania	Inactive	
Tau	1863 – 1867; 1984 – 1990	Princeton University	Princeton, New Jersey	Inactive	
Upsilon	1865 – 1871; 1968 – 1977	Bucknell University	Lewisburg, Pennsylvania	Inactive	
Phi	1867 – 1886; 1889 – 2001	Lafayette College	Easton, Pennsylvania	Inactive	
Chi	1867 – 1880; 1892 – 1996; 2002 – 2009	University of Rochester	Rochester, New York	Inactive	
Psi	1868 – 2015	Hamilton College	Clinton, New York	Inactive	(Note: This chapter originated as Zeta Phi (local) in 1867.)
**Omicron Deuteron**	September 28, 1869	Dartmouth College	Hanover, New Hampshire	Active	
Rho	1869 – 1872	Washington and Lee University	Lexington, Virginia	Inactive	
**Beta**	January 11, 1870	Cornell University	Ithaca, New York	Suspended	(Note: The Cornell charge maintains a campus presence but is suspended from normal operations until the fall of 2026.)
Lambda	1877 – 1912	Boston University	Boston, Massachusetts	Inactive	
**Omega**				Memorial	
**Upsilon Deuteron**	May 24, 1879 – 1882; April 26, 1992	Wabash College	Crawfordsville, Indiana	Active	(Note: This chapter originated as the Beta Psi chapter of Delta Tau Delta, formed in 1872. It withdrew to become the Upsilon Deuteron charge of Theta Delta Chi in 1879.)
Pi Deuteron	1881 – 1931	City University of New York	New York City, New York	Inactive	(Note: This chapter originated as Delta Beta Phi (local), formed in 1878.)
Rho Deuteron	1883 – 1929	Columbia University	New York City, New York	Inactive	
Nu Deuteron	1884 – 1992; 1997 – 2004	Lehigh University	Bethlehem, Pennsylvania	Inactive	
Mu Deuteron	1885 – 1969; 1986 – 2006	Amherst College	Amherst, Massachusetts	Inactive	(Note: The chapter was revived in 1986 by absorption of Theta Delta (local), which had formed in 1969; likely from the original TDX chapter. Greek Letter organizations were officially banned at Amherst College in 1984. The chapter lingered some time as a sub rosa group.)
Epsilon Deuteron	1887 – 1900	Yale University	New Haven, Connecticut	Inactive	
**Gamma Deuteron**	December 13, 1889 – 1997; March 21, 2009	University of Michigan	Ann Arbor, Michigan	Active	
**Theta Deuteron**	March 21, 1890 – 1892; June 2, 1906	Massachusetts Institute of Technology	Cambridge, Massachusetts	Active	(Note: This chapter was restored in 1906 by absorption of Alpha Epsilon (local), which had formed in 1902.)
Iota Deuteron	1891 – 1966	Williams College	Williamstown, Massachusetts	Inactive	(Note: Fraternities were banned at Williams College in 1962; the TDX chapter lingered a few years after the ban was imposed.)
Tau Deuteron	1892 – 1984	University of Minnesota	Minneapolis, Minnesota	Inactive	(Note: This chapter originated as the Addisonian Society (local), formed in 1890.)
**Sigma Deuteron**	May 15, 1895	University of Wisconsin–Madison	Madison, Wisconsin	Active	(Note: This chapter originated as Sigma Delta Sigma (local), formed in 1894.)
Chi Deuteron	1896 – 1956; 1987 – 2013	George Washington University	Washington, D.C.	Inactive	
**Delta Deuteron**	April 20, 1900	University of California, Berkeley	Berkeley, California	Active	
Zeta Deuteron	1901 – 1972	McGill University	Montreal, Quebec	Inactive	(Note: This chapter originated as Sigma Phi (local), which had been established in 1900. This local was not affiliated with the national fraternity of the same name.)
**Eta Deuteron**	April 25, 1903	Stanford University	Stanford, California	Suspended	(Note: This chapter originated as Delta Kappa (local), which had formed in 1902.) (Note: The Eta Deuteron charge is suspended, pending the resolution of legal proceedings. According to a 22 March 2021 article in the Stanford Report, the suspension was levied on charges of substance abuse.)
Kappa Deuteron	1908 – 1970; 1982 – 1999	University of Illinois at Urbana-Champaign	Urbana, Illinois	Inactive	(Note: This chapter originated as Omicron Alpha Chi (local), which had formed in 1905.)
**Lambda Deuteron**	December 21, 1912	University of Toronto	Toronto, Ontario, Canada	Active	(Note: This chapter originated as Sigma Delta (local), which had formed in 1909.)
**Xi Deuteron**	January 4, 1913	University of Washington	Seattle, Washington	Active	(Note: This chapter originated as the Chalet Club (local), formed in 1909.)
Phi Deuteron	1915 – 1934	University of Pennsylvania	Philadelphia, Pennsylvania	Inactive	(Note: This chapter originated as Alpha Omega (local), formed in 1909. Coincidently, the Beta chapter of Alpha Omega (fraternity), a Jewish professional dental fraternity formed on the campus in 1910, but there appears to be no connection.)
**Beta Deuteron**	December 13, 1919	Iowa State University	Ames, Iowa	Active	(Note: This chapter originated as the Colonials (local), formed in 1908.)
**Psi Deuteron**	June 8, 1929 – 2003; February 20, 2010	University of California, Los Angeles	Los Angeles, California	Active	(Note: This chapter originated as Psi Delta (local), which had formed in 1925.)
Kappa Triton	1951 – 1989	Northwestern University	Evanston, Illinois	Inactive	(Note: This chapter originated as the Oaks Club (local), formed in 1949.)
**Sigma Triton**	May 22, 1954	Pennsylvania State University	University Park, Pennsylvania	Active	(Note: This chapter originated as the Beta chapter of Sigma Phi Sigma, a national fraternity which disbanded several years prior, of which the Penn State group was the last to use that name. Prior to this, the group had originated as Iota Chi Delta (local), which was first established in 1913.)
**Epsilon Triton**	December 2, 1961 – 1994 ; April 26, 2008	Arizona State University	Tempe, Arizona	Active	
**Omicron Triton**	1963 – 2000; November 12, 2022	University of Rhode Island	Kingston, Rhode Island	Active	(Note: This group originated as Beta Psi Alpha (local), formed in 1933.)
**Gamma Triton**	April 18, 1964	Michigan State University	East Lansing, Michigan	Active	(Note: This chapter originated as the Oaks Club (local), formed in 1962.)
Psi Triton	1968 – 1980;	University of California, Santa Barbara	Santa Barbara, California	Inactive	
Zeta Triton	1968 – 1970	University of Calgary	Calgary, Alberta, Canada	Inactive	
**Nu Triton**	November 15, 1970	Virginia Tech	Blacksburg, Virginia	Active	(Note: This chapter originated as Delta Sigma Chi (local), formed in 1957.)
**Rho Triton**	November 15, 1970 – 2002; March 17, 2018	Virginia Commonwealth University	Richmond, Virginia	Active	(Note: This chapter originated as Gamma Chi (local), which had formed in 1968.)
Phi Proteron	1972 – 1973	University of Central Florida	Orange County, Florida	Inactive	
Pi Triton	1972 – 1979	California University of Pennsylvania	California, Pennsylvania	Inactive	
Beta Triton	1978 – 1981	Lake Forest College	Lake Forest, Illinois	Inactive	
Delta Triton	1990 – 2005	Northeastern University	Boston, Massachusetts	Inactive	
Eta Triton	1994 – 2005	Nova Southeastern University	Fort Lauderdale-Davie, Florida	Inactive	
**Xi Triton**	September 21, 1996 – 1999; April 6, 2013	State University of New York at Albany	Albany, New York	Active	
**Mu Triton**	March 27, 1999	University of North Carolina at Greensboro	Greensboro, North Carolina	Active	(Note: This chapter originated as Beta Eta Omicron (local), which had formed in 1993.)
Chi Triton	2000 – 2008	Merrimack College	North Andover, Massachusetts	Inactive	(Note: This chapter originated as Alpha Chi Epsilon (local), which had formed in 1994.)
**Iota Triton**	August 6, 2005	University of Massachusetts Dartmouth	Dartmouth, Massachusetts	Active	
Theta Triton	April 28, 2007 - 2022	Binghamton University	Binghamton, New York	Inactive	
**Tau Triton**	April 19, 2008	Marist University	Poughkeepsie, New York	Active	
Lambda Triton	2008 – 2021	Rutgers University	New Jersey	Inactive	
Upsilon Triton	2011 – 2015	Indiana University Bloomington	Bloomington, Indiana	Inactive	
**Tau Tetraton**	February 22, 2015	Johnson & Wales University	Providence, Rhode Island	Active	
**Psi Tetraton**	February 11, 2017	University of Arizona	Tucson, Arizona	Active	
