= Friendship (indie rock band) =

American indie rock band

- Origin: Philadelphia, Pennsylvania, USA
- Genres: Indie rock
- Years active: 2015–present
- Labels: Burst & Bloom; Sleeper; Orindal; Merge
- Members: Dan Wriggins; Michael Cormier-O'Leary; Peter Gill; Jon Samuels
- Website: friendshipmusic.net

Friendship is an American indie rock band from Philadelphia, Pennsylvania. The band consists of Dan Wriggins, Michael Cormier-O'Leary, Peter Gill, and Jon Samuels.

== History ==
Friendship began in 2015 with the release of their first full-length album, You're Going to Have to Trust Me, on Burst & Bloom. On August 8, 2017, the band premiered a song titled "If You See My Beloved" from their upcoming second full-length album. They premiered another song on Stereogum in October titled "Skip To The Good Part". Their second full-length album, and first on Orindal Records, titled Shock Out Of Season, was released later in 2017. On September 11, 2019, Friendship once again premiered a new song through Stereogum titled "Clairvoyant". One month later, Friendship premiered another song on Stereogum titled "You Might Already Know". The album, Dreamin', was released on November 8, 2019. On July 29th, 2022, the band released their fourth full-length album, Love the Stranger, on Merge Records. Its fifth studio album, Caveman Wakes Up, was released in 2025.

== Discography ==
=== LPs ===
- You're Going to Have to Trust Me (2015, Burst & Bloom)
- Shock Out of Season (2017, Orindal Records)
- Dreamin' (2019, Orindal Records)
- Love the Stranger (2022, Merge Records)
- Caveman Wakes Up (2025, Merge Records)
- Chaos Outside (Free Association Remixes) (2025)

=== EPs ===
- F/V Hope (2017, Sleeper Records)
