= Thomas William Herringshaw =

American journalist (1858–1927)

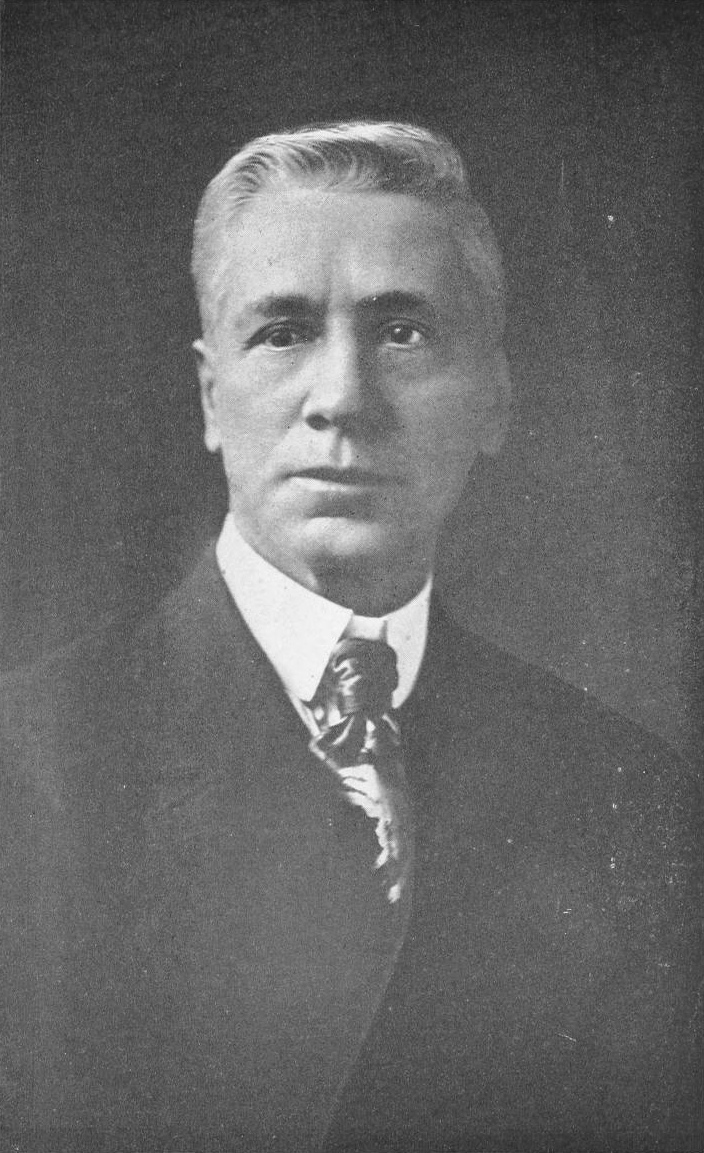
Thomas William Herringshaw (1858–1927)

Thomas William Herringshaw (January 27, 1858 – June 27, 1927) was an American journalist, publisher, genealogist and biographical author, best known for editing and publishing biographical reference works.

== Biography ==
According to the biographical sketch provided for his own National Library of American Biography, Herringshaw was born in Lincolnshire, England, and claimed descent from the Heronshaw family of Boston, Lincolnshire. He was brought up in America, where he studied at the Chicago Athenaeum and the Chicago union college of law. From 1875 to 1879 he worked as a printer in New York City, Philadelphia and Chicago. In 1879 he established and edited the magazine Farm, Field and Fireside, and became president of the Farm, Field and Fireside publishing company when it was incorporated in 1880.

In 1880 Herringshaw, who claimed himself the author of a volume titled Mulierology, married Mary Linna Jones: they lived near Lincoln Park. They also kept up a country villa, Herringshaw Hall, built of solid-cut granite, on the highest point in Lake County, Illinois. Selling his interest in Farm, Field and Fireside, Herringshaw established a Chicago printing office. In 1884 he founded the American Publishers' Association, was its president, and used it to publish various biographical reference works associated with his name. He died in Cook County, Illinois, aged 69.

== Works ==
- The Biographical Review of Prominent Men and Women of the Day, A. B. Gehman & Co, 1888
- [Anon.], Mulierology, or the Science of Woman, Home Publishing House, Chicago, 1890
- (ed.) Poetical Quotations, American Publishers' Company, 1892
- (ed.) Poets of America, American Publishers' Company, 1894
- (ed.) Herringshaw's Encyclopedia of American Biography, 1898
- (ed.) Library of American Literature, American Publishers' Company
- Herringshaw's National Library of American Biography, 5 vols, American Publishers' Company, 1909–14.
- (ed.) Herringshaw's American Blue Book of Biography, American Publishers' Company, published annually
