= Ralston Creek (Iowa) =

River in Iowa, United States

Coordinates: 41.6455724°N 91.5360013°W

Ralston Creek is a stream in Johnson County, Iowa, in the United States.

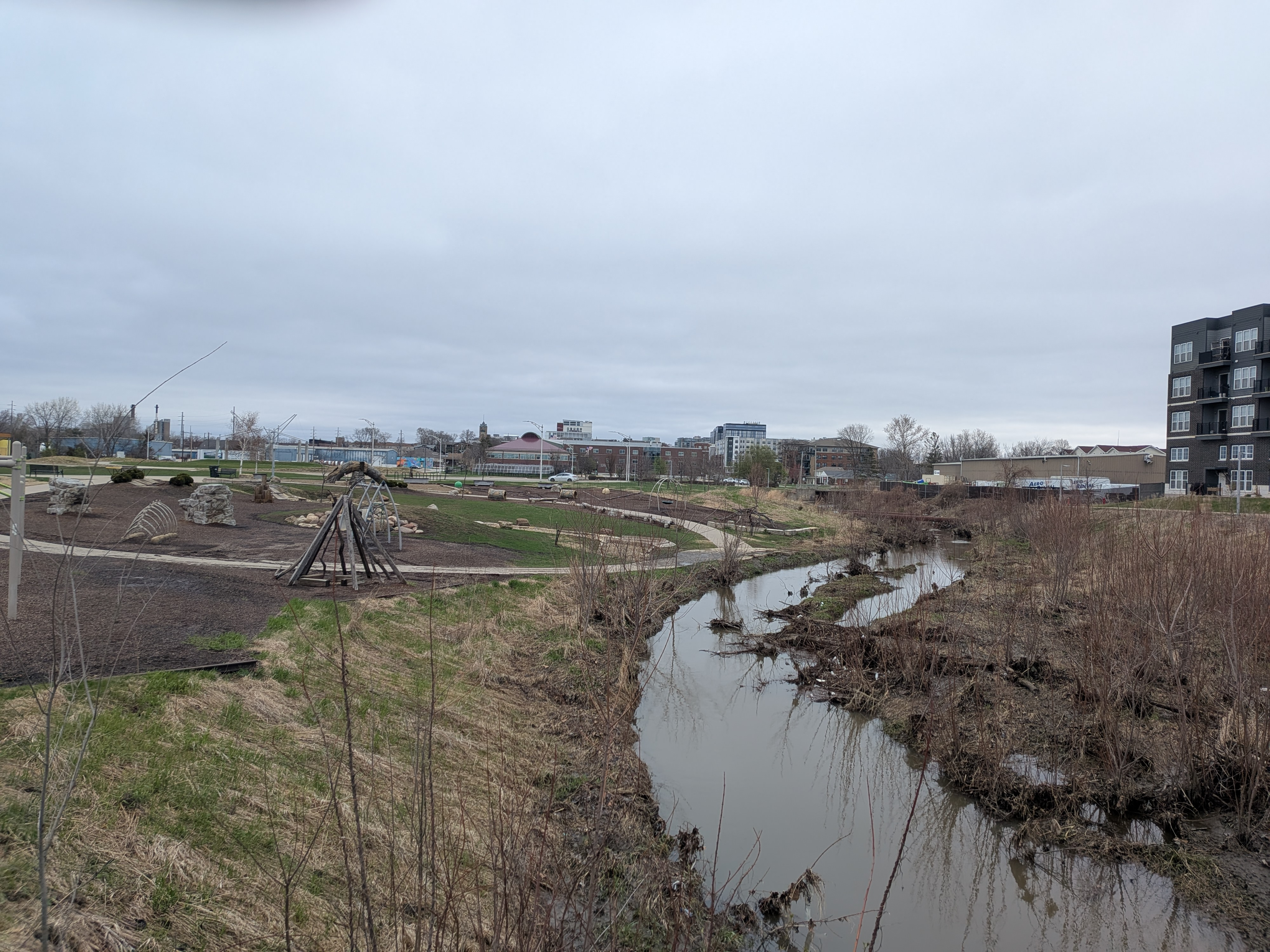
Ralston Creek (Iowa) flowing through River Front Crossings Park

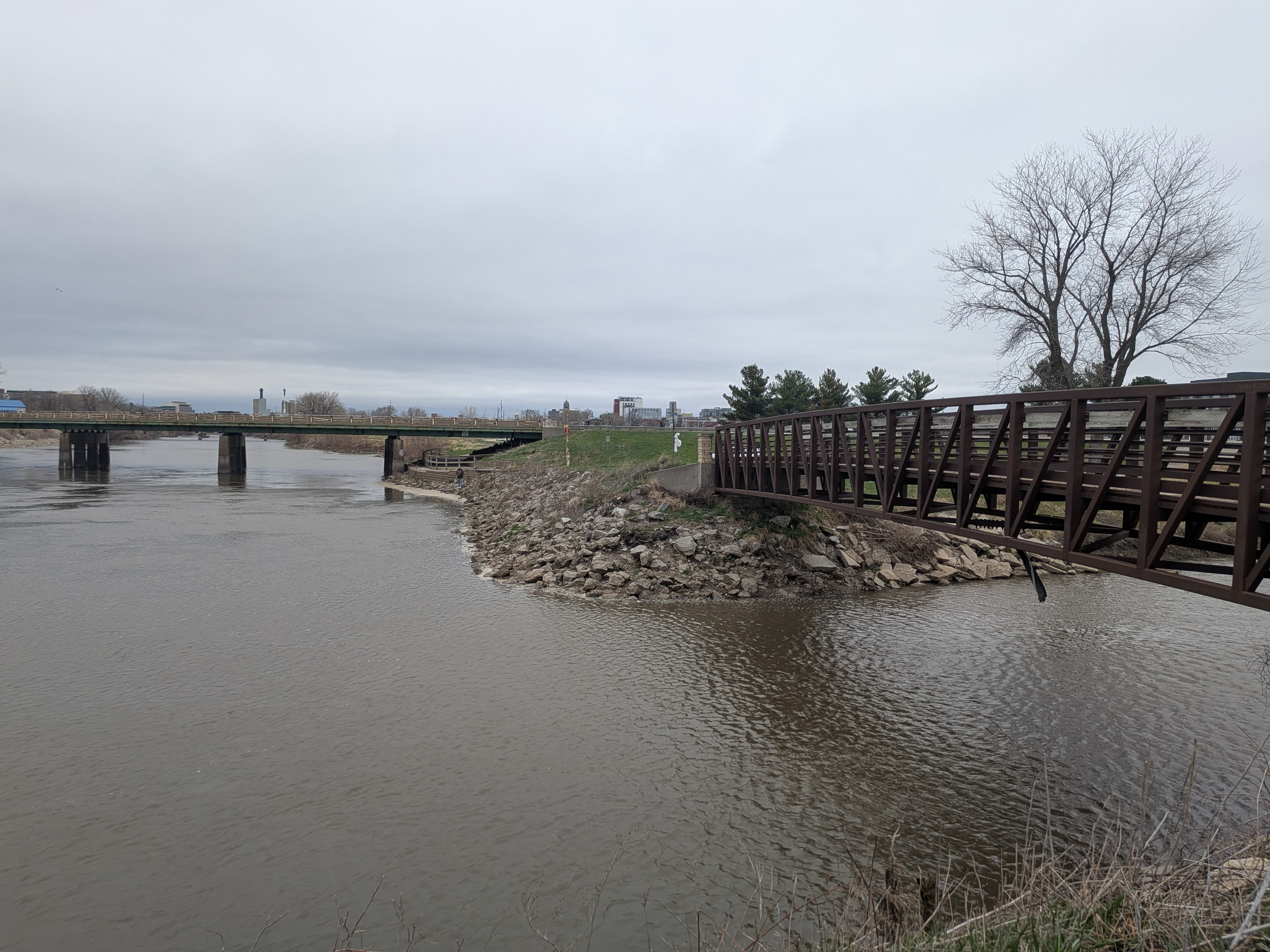
Confluence of Ralston Creek and Iowa River

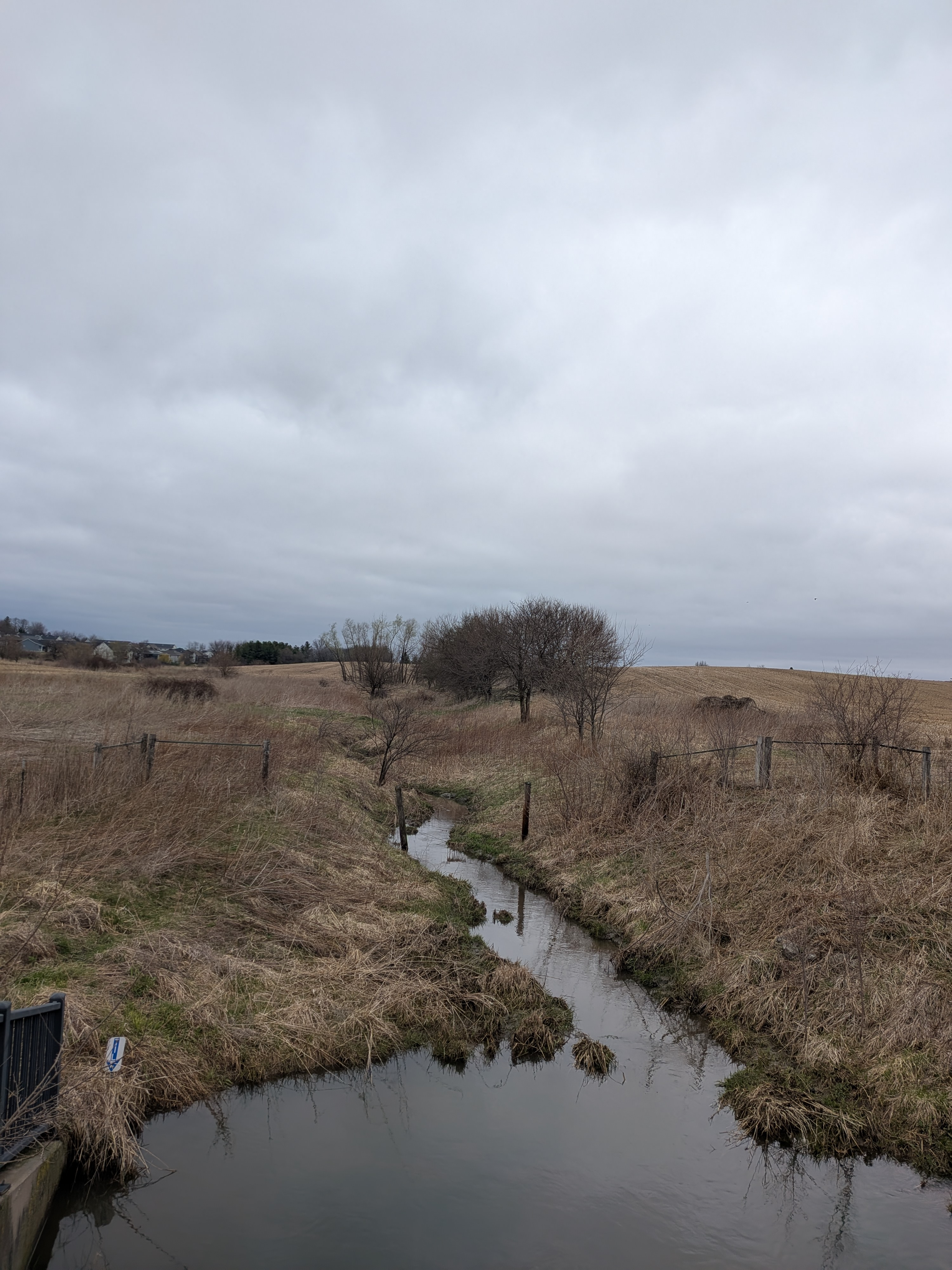
Ralston Creek (Johnson County, Iowa) headwaters

It is a tributary to the Iowa River, and its confluence is just south of Highway 6, approximately 1 mile south of the University of Iowa campus and downtown Iowa City. According to hydrologic studies conducted by the University of Iowa's Iowa Institute of Hydraulic Research (IIHR), it drains approximately three square miles of mostly urban and formerly agricultural land in eastern Iowa City.

Ralston Creek was named for Robert Ralston, a founder of Iowa City.

== See also ==
- List of rivers of Iowa
