= E. O. Wooton =

U.S. botanist (1865–1945)

Elmer Ottis Wooton (19 September 1865 – 1945), was an American botanist, professor of chemistry and botany at New Mexico State College from 1890 to 1911, assistant curator at the National Herbarium in 1910, and employed by the US Department of Agriculture from 1911 to 1935. The species Astragalus wootonii and Cheilanthes wootonii were named after him.

He edited and distributed an exsiccata with specimens collected by him under the title New Mexico plants.

The standard author abbreviation Wooton is used to indicate this person as the author when citing a botanical name.

== Sources ==
- Allred, Kelly (2008) "E. O. Wooton: New Mexico's Pioneer Botanist" Rangelands 30(5): pp. 11–17
- Spellenberg, Ricard (7 May 1997) "The NMSU Herbarium (NMC)" The New Mexico Botanist Issue number 5
- Standley, Paul C. (1947). "E. O. Wooton". Journal of the Washington Academy of Sciences. 37: 34–35.
