= Double Dragon Publishing =

Defunct Canadian publisher

- Founded: 2000
- Founder: Deron Douglas
- Defunct: 2020
- Successor: Fiction4All
- Country of origin: Canada
- Headquarters location: Markham, Ontario
- Distribution: Electronic
- Key people: Deron Douglas
- Fiction genres: Science-fiction, fantasy, horror
- Imprints: Eight separate imprints
- Official website: double-dragon-ebooks.com Double Dragon web site archive at the Wayback Machine (archived July 6, 2020)

Double Dragon Publishing was a Canadian-based publisher specializing in e-book format publication. Founded by Deron Douglas in 2000, the company claimed the largest collection of titles in the science fiction and fantasy categories in print, with annual sales of over 45,000 units prior to its closure in 2020.

== History ==
The firm was founded as a single-imprint small press publisher in 2000 by Deron Douglas. The publishing house has since grown into a stable publisher with eight separate imprints, focusing on different genres, but generally within the science-fiction, fantasy, horror, and paranormal romance subgenres.

While specializing in eBook publication, the firm also released paperback books, graphic novels, and pocket books.

Authors included Jedaiah Ramnarine, Gail Z. Martin, J.M. Frey, Danny Birt, Geoff Nelder, Simon Drake, Dan DeBono, Tony Teora, E. Rose Sabin, David Conway, Steve Lazarowitz, Michael A. Ventrella, Ben Manning, Thomm Quackenbush, Margret A. Treiber, Gillian Duce and the late Nick Pollotta.

Deron Douglas sold the Double Dragon Publishing brand in 2020 and retired from the publishing industry to create fine art full-time under the name D. Ahsén:nase Douglas.

== Electronic publishing ==
DDP publishes books in Rocket-eBook, Hiebook, Adobe PDF, MS Reader, Mobipocket, iSilo, Franklin eBookMan, and Palm Doc formats. While some selected texts are issued in audiobook format, the majority are electronic only. Their focus on electronic format sales led Piers Anthony to note in 2004 that "DD is one of the best, perhaps THE best, of the electronic publishers".

== Awards ==
- Winner, MyShelf Publishing Award, 2002
- Winner, Best Performance by a Publisher, KnowBetter.com, 2002
- Runner-Up, Wooden Rocket Award for best e-book publisher, computercrowsnest.com, 2003
- Nominated for four Eppie Awards, 2003
- Nominated for six Eppie Awards, 2004
