= Sabin (surname) =

Sabin is the surname of the following people:

- Albert Sabin (1906–1993), Polish-American medical researcher who developed an oral polio vaccine; President of the Weizmann Institute of Science
- Alvah Sabin (1793–1885), American politician
- Alec Sabin (born 1947), British actor
- Alfred Sabin (1905–1982), English footballer
- Andrew Sabin (born 1958), British sculptor
- Arthur Knowles Sabin (1879–1959), British writer, poet and printer
- Cédric Sabin (born 1979), French football forward
- Chauncey Brewer Sabin (1824–1890), United States federal judge
- Chris Sabin (born 1982), American professional wrestler
- Daniel Sabin, American engineer
- Diane Sabin (born 1952), American feminist activist
- Dmitry Sabin (born 1979), Ukrainian sprint canoer
- Dwight M. Sabin (1843–1902), American politician
- E. Rose Sabin, American author of fantasy and science fiction novels
- Edwin L. Sabin (1870–1952), American author of boys adventure stories
- Ellen Clara Sabin (1850–1949), American educator
- Éric Sabin (born 1974), French football player
- Florence R. Sabin (1871–1953), American medical scientist
- George Myron Sabin (1833–1890), American jurist
- Henry Sabin (1829–1918), American educator
- Hib Sabin (born 1935), American sculptor and educator
- Ibn Sab'in, a Sufi philosopher
- James Sabin, American psychiatrist and medical educator
- Jorge Alejandro Sabin (born 1957), United States medical doctor
- Joseph Sabin (1821–1881), bibliographer
- Kira Sabin (born 1998/1999), American wildlife painter
- Mike Sabin (born 1968), New Zealand police officer, drug educator and politician
- Oliver Sabin (born 1991), Scottish electronic music/chip music composer known as Unicorn Kid
- Pauline Sabin (1887–1955), American founder of the Women's Organization for National Prohibition Reform
- Philip Sabin, British military historian
- Portia Sabin, American music industry executive
- Roger Sabin, English writer
- Wallace Arthur Sabin (1869–1937), American composer and organist
- Warwick Sabin, American publisher
- Wayne Sabin (1915–1989), American tennis player
- William Warren Sabin (1861–1939), American architect

== See also ==
- Sabine (surname)
