= Sabin =

Sabin may refer to:

== Places ==
=== United States ===
- Sabin, Minnesota, a city in Clay County, Minnesota
- Sabin, Portland, Oregon, a neighborhood in Portland, Oregon
- Sabin, Wisconsin, an unincorporated community in the town of Sylvan, Wisconsin

=== Elsewhere ===
- Sabin Etxea, the official headquarters of the Basque Nationalist Party

== Other uses ==
- Sabin (given name)
- Sabin (surname)
- Sabin of Bulgaria, Khan of Bulgaria from 765 to 766
- Sabin (unit), a unit of sound absorption
- Sabin Figaro, fictional character in the video game Final Fantasy VI

== See also ==
- Sabine (disambiguation)
- Saidhbhín
