= Sive =

Sive may refer to:

- Sive means hear us in isiXhosa
- David Sive (1922–2014), American attorney, environmentalist, and professor of environmental law
- Sive (noun), a Nation, a large body of people united by common descent, history, culture, or language, inhabiting a particular state or territory.
- Sive (company), SiveHost.com, or SiveICT.co.za. A technology company focusing on online systems, mobile Apps, Business Email Services and Website Hosting.
- Sive (name), anglicised spelling of Sadhbh, an Irish female given name
- Sive (play), by John B. Keane
- Sive (musician), stage name of Sadhbh O'Sullivan
- Alternative spelling for "Sadhbh Ní Bhruinneallaigh" an Irish folk song that was given the moniker by Celtic Woman
- Sive (YouTuber), Known for graffiti tutorials and graffiti styles.
