= GUD Magazine =

Speculative fiction magazine

- Inaugural issue of GUD Magazine.
- Editor: Rotational
- Categories: literature
- Frequency: 2 per year
- Circulation: 900
- Publisher: Greatest Uncommon Denominator Publishing, Inc.
- First issue: Spring 2007
- Country: United States
- Language: American English, British English, Canadian English, Australian English
- Website: www.gudmagazine.com
- ISSN: 1932-8222

Greatest Uncommon Denominator Magazine (also known as GUD Magazine) was an American literary magazine, the first publication from Greatest Uncommon Denominator Publishing, founded in Laconia, New Hampshire in July 2006.

== Format and periodicity ==
Greatest Uncommon Denominator contained literary and genre fiction, poetry, essays, and art and featureed authors and artists from around the world. GUD paid semi-pro rates for content and paid royalties on the profits of the sales of the magazine, effectively making the contributors shareholders for that issue.

GUD Magazine also featured reviews of small press publications on-line, independent of its publication schedule.

The magazine, published irregularly, was available for purchase in print and many electronic formats, including:

- Portable Document Format (PDF)
- Palm Doc (PDB)
- Rocket Reader/REB1100 (RB)
- Microsoft Reader (LIT) - PocketPC 1.0+ Compatible
- Franklin eBookMan (FUB)
- hiebook (KML)
- Sony Reader (LRF)
- iSilo (PDB)
- Mobipocket (PRC)
- OEBFF format (IMP)

1871 submissions were read and responded to between July 2006 to the end of January 2007. The initial print run for Issue 0 was 200 copies, which was quickly followed up by an additional print run of 200. As of June, 2009, over 11,000 responses have been sent—with a record of over 800 submissions coming in during May, 2009. Working towards its goal of paying out royalties to its contributors, GUD boosted its circulation of early issues from 400 to 700 in the last week of November 2009 with its "pay what you want" sale.

The magazine was announced to have shut down on October 29, 2021.

== Ownership ==
The magazine was a publication of GUD Publishing, Inc., an organization started in 2006 by Mike Coombes, Sal Coraccio, Kaolin Fire, and Sue Miller. As of February 2007, the active members included Julia Bernd, Sal Coraccio, Kaolin Fire, Sue Miller and Debbie Moorhouse.

== List of editors ==
- Kaolin Fire, Issues 0+5
- Sue Miller, Issues 1+8
- Sal Coraccio, Issue 2
- Debbie Moorhouse, Issues 3+6
- Julia de Caradeuc Bernd, Issues 4+7

== Awards ==
T. L. Morganfield, ‘Night Bird Soaring’, Issue #3: Sidewise Awards (Shortlisted: Best Short-Form Alternate History 2009)

Kirstyn McDermott, ‘Painlessness’, Issue #2: Aurealis Awards (Best Horror Short Story, 2008) and Ditmar Awards (Best Novella/Novelette 2009)

Neal Blaikie, ‘Offworld Friends are Best’, Issue #2: Locus Recommended Reading List, 2008

Stories from GUD Issues 0 and 1 received 3 honorable mentions in The Year's Best Fantasy and Horror Awards 2008:

1. Steven J. Dines's "Unzipped"
2. Sarah Singleton and Chris Butler's "Songs of the Dead"
3. Leslie Claire Walker's "Max Velocity"

In 2008, GUD was considered one of the "Top 100 Markets for Magazine Writers and Book Writers" by Writer's Digest.

== See also ==
- List of literary magazines
