= University Heights, Iowa =

- City
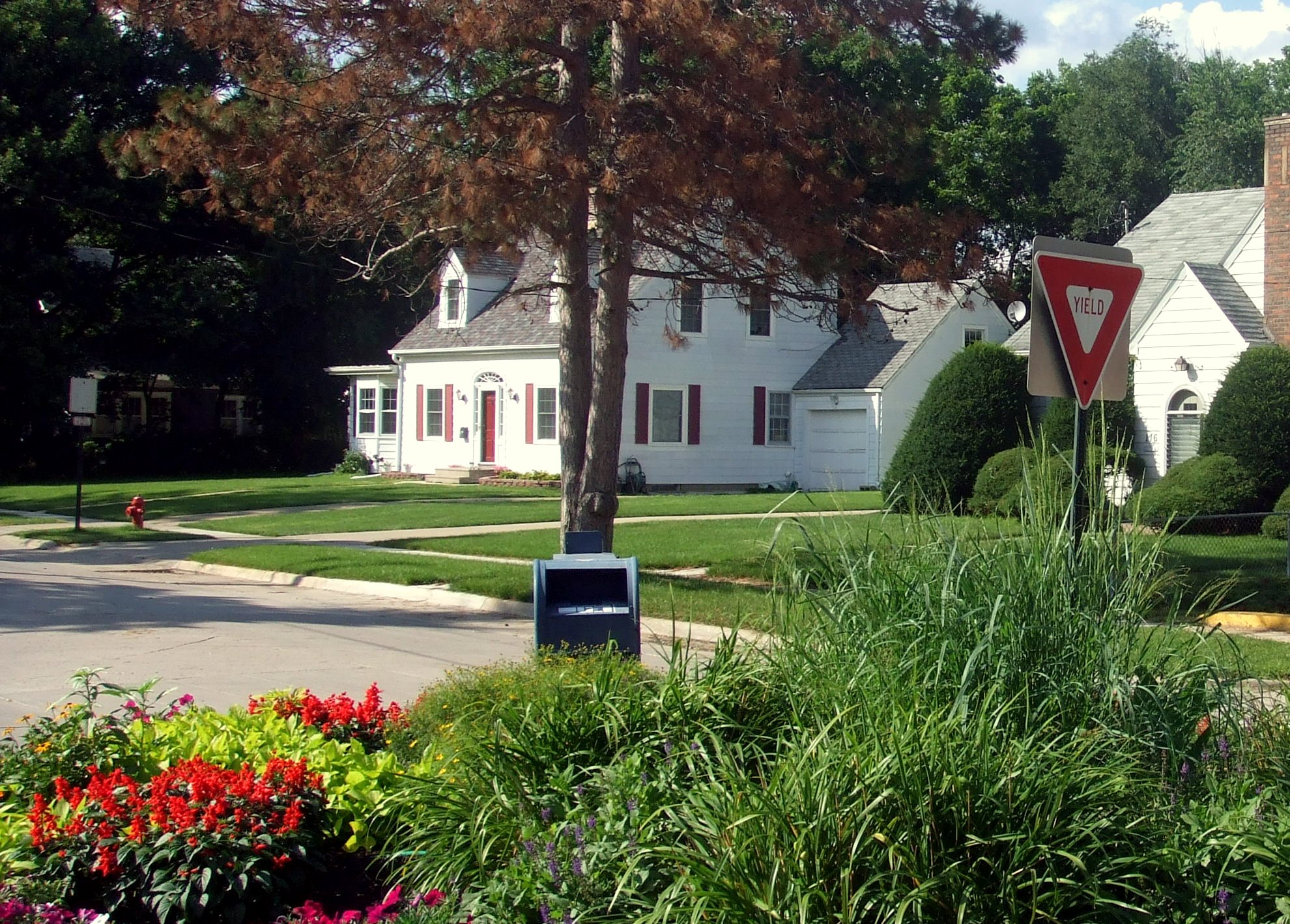
- The Melrose Triangle in University Heights

- Seal
- Motto: The Height of Good Living
- Location of University Heights, Iowa
- Coordinates: 41°39′18″N 91°33′32″W
- Country: United States
- State: Iowa
- County: Johnson
- Incorporated: August 13, 1935

Government
  - Type: Mayor-council government

Area
  - Total: 0.27 sq mi (0.69 km^{2})
  - Land: 0.27 sq mi (0.69 km^{2})
  - Water: 0 sq mi (0.00 km^{2})
- Elevation: 781 ft (238 m)

Population (2020)
  - Total: 1,228
  - Density: 4,617.5/sq mi (1,782.83/km^{2})
- Time zone: UTC-6 (Central (CST))
  - Summer (DST): UTC-5 (CDT)
- ZIP code: 52246
- Area code: 319
- FIPS code: 19-79770
- GNIS feature ID: 2397092
- Website: www.university-heights.org

University Heights is a city in Johnson County, Iowa, United States. It is part of the Iowa City, Iowa Metropolitan Statistical Area. The population was 1,228 at the time of the 2020 census. It is an enclave surrounded by Iowa City, located near the campus of the University of Iowa. The University Heights city border is approximately 0.1 miles from Kinnick Stadium. It is also the most densely populated city in Iowa, with a population density of 4,617.5 people per square mile.

== History ==
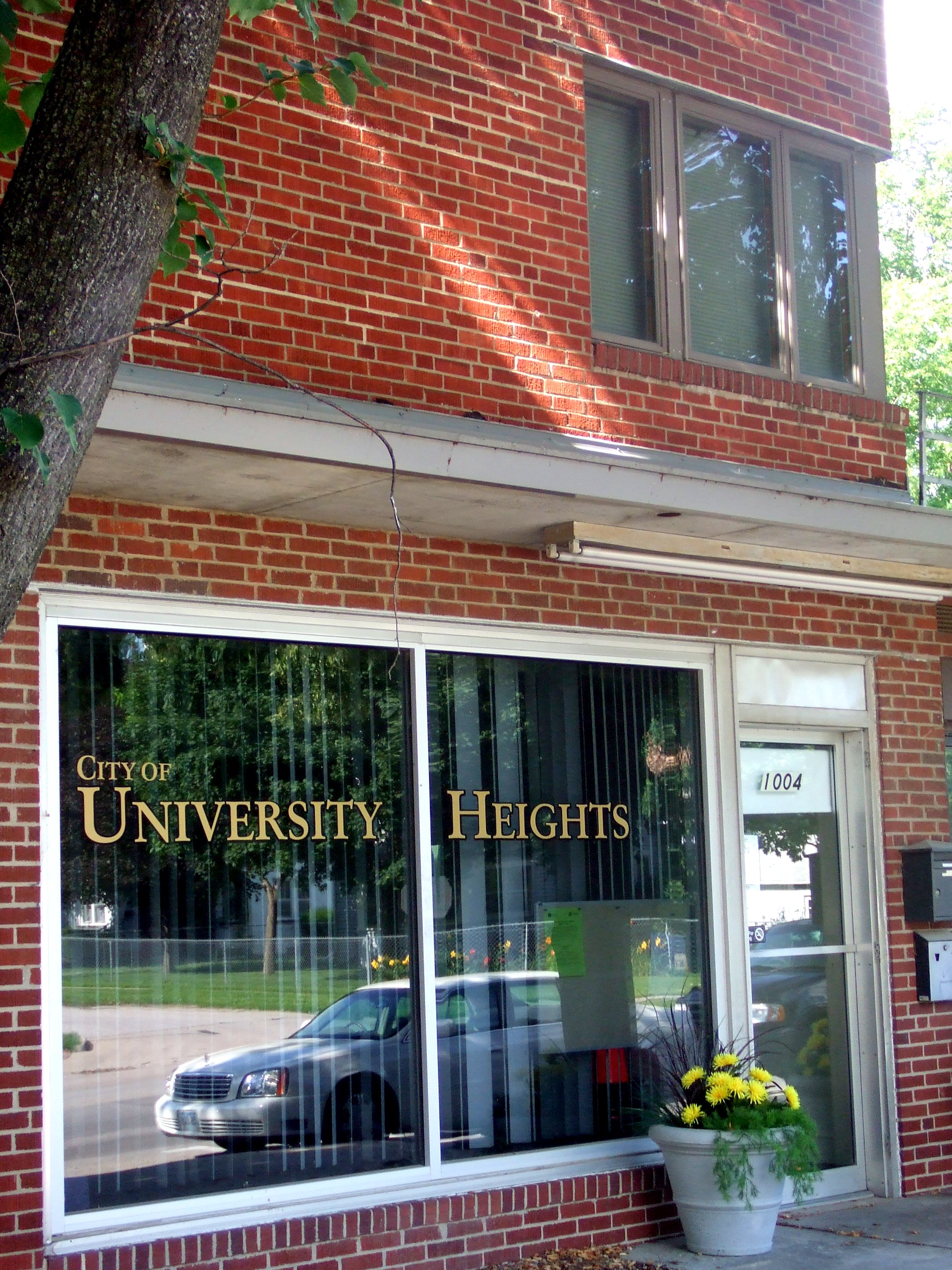
University Heights City Hall

At the turn of the 20th century, the area of present-day University Heights was known as West Lucas Township and consisted of several small farms and properties. At that time, the University of Iowa and Iowa City at large had not yet expanded westward past the Iowa River.

In the early 1920s, brothers Lee and George Koser began purchasing and developing the land that became the city of University Heights, anticipating the westward expansion of the university and the city. With the construction of the university's General Hospital in 1928 and Kinnick Stadium in 1929, those predictions came true. By 1933, the City of Iowa City began annexing land on the west side of the river and in 1935, the city of University Heights was incorporated. By the 1960s, most of the remaining lots west of Sunset St. were developed and the land surrounding University Heights had been annexed by Iowa City, limiting future growth.

All 241 lots in the original subdivisions of University Heights were set up with restrictive covenants stating that the lots were "for the sole use and benefit of the Caucasian Race and no lot or parcel shall be sold, owned, or used or occupied by the people of any other race, except when used in the capacity of a servant or helper". For 218 of the lots, Lee, Reka, George, and Tessie Koser were responsible for the language, while for the remaining 23, L.R. and Elizabeth Leamer were responsible. These racially restrictive covenants were legally enforceable until the Shelley vs. Kraemer US Supreme Court decision in 1948.

Despite this history, the city voted generally for the Democratic party in presidential elections since 1964. In 2024 Kamala Harris received nearly 70% of the vote. From 1976 to 1987, David Belgum, a member of the Socialist Party of America was mayor.

== Geography ==
According to the United States Census Bureau, the city has a total area of 0.27 square miles (0.70 km^{2}), all land.

External videos
- University Heights: A Unique Community, Senior Center Television

== Demographics ==
Historical Populations
| Year | Pop. | ±% |
|---|---|---|
| 1940 | 261 | — |
| 1950 | 446 | +70.9% |
| 1960 | 841 | +88.6% |
| 1970 | 1,265 | +50.4% |
| 1980 | 1,069 | −15.5% |
| 1990 | 1,042 | −2.5% |
| 2000 | 987 | −5.3% |
| 2010 | 1,051 | +6.5% |
| 2020 | 1,228 | +16.8% |
Source:"U.S. Census website". United States Census Bureau. and Iowa Data Center; Source: U.S. Decennial Census

=== 2020 census ===
As of the 2020 census, University Heights had a population of 1,228 people, with 564 households and 278 families. The population density was 4,617.5 inhabitants per square mile (1,782.8/km^{2}).

The median age was 30.4 years. 15.1% of residents were under the age of 18 and 14.2% were 65 years of age or older. 17.8% of residents were under the age of 20; 16.5% were between the ages of 20 and 24; 33.9% were from 25 to 44; and 17.7% were from 45 to 64. For every 100 females there were 100.7 males, and for every 100 females age 18 and over there were 97.0 males age 18 and over. The gender makeup of the city was 50.2% male and 49.8% female.

100.0% of residents lived in urban areas, while 0.0% lived in rural areas.

Of the 564 households, 22.0% had children under the age of 18 living in them. Of all households, 39.5% were married-couple households, 8.5% were cohabiting-couple households, 22.5% were households with a male householder and no spouse or partner present, and 29.4% were households with a female householder and no spouse or partner present. 50.7% of households were non-families. About 33.0% of all households were made up of individuals, and 5.6% had someone living alone who was 65 years of age or older.

There were 673 housing units at an average density of 2,530.6 per square mile (977.1/km^{2}), of which 16.2% were vacant. The homeowner vacancy rate was 13.0% and the rental vacancy rate was 10.7%.

Racial composition as of the 2020 census
| Race | Number | Percent |
|---|---|---|
| White | 1,049 | 85.4% |
| Black or African American | 22 | 1.8% |
| American Indian and Alaska Native | 2 | 0.2% |
| Asian | 54 | 4.4% |
| Native Hawaiian and Other Pacific Islander | 3 | 0.2% |
| Some other race | 18 | 1.5% |
| Two or more races | 80 | 6.5% |
| Hispanic or Latino (of any race) | 38 | 3.1% |

=== 2010 census ===
As of the census of 2010, there were 1,051 people, 474 households, and 251 families residing in the city. The population density was 3,892.6 inhabitants per square mile (1,502.9/km^{2}). There were 512 housing units at an average density of 1,896.3 per square mile (732.2/km^{2}). The racial makeup of the city was 93.5% White, 1.0% African American, 3.3% Asian, 0.3% Pacific Islander, 0.1% from other races, and 1.7% from two or more races. Hispanic or Latino of any race were 2.8% of the population.

There were 474 households, of which 21.9% had children under the age of 18 living with them, 44.9% were married couples living together, 5.7% had a female householder with no husband present, 2.3% had a male householder with no wife present, and 47.0% were non-families. 31.2% of all households were made up of individuals, and 5.2% had someone living alone who was 65 years of age or older. The average household size was 2.22 and the average family size was 2.78.

The median age in the city was 30.5 years. 17.1% of residents were under the age of 18; 17.8% were between the ages of 18 and 24; 32.3% were from 25 to 44; 21.5% were from 45 to 64; and 11.3% were 65 years of age or older. The gender makeup of the city was 50.6% male and 49.4% female.

=== 2000 census ===
As of the census of 2000, there were 987 people, 467 households, and 254 families residing in the city. The population density was 3,626.3 inhabitants per square mile (1,400.1/km^{2}). There were 477 housing units at an average density of 1,752.5 per square mile (676.6/km^{2}). The racial makeup of the city was 95.95% White, 0.91% African American, 1.22% Asian, 0.10% Pacific Islander, 0.41% from other races, and 1.42% from two or more races. Hispanic or Latino of any race were 1.62% of the population.

There were 467 households, out of which 22.1% had children under the age of 18 living with them, 46.9% were married couples living together, 4.5% had a female householder with no husband present, and 45.6% were non-families. 35.8% of all households were made up of individuals, and 6.9% had someone living alone who was 65 years of age or older. The average household size was 2.11 and the average family size was 2.74.

18.1% are under the age of 18, 10.7% from 18 to 24, 36.1% from 25 to 44, 22.5% from 45 to 64, and 12.6% who were 65 years of age or older. The median age was 36 years. For every 100 females, there were 101.4 males. For every 100 females age 18 and over, there were 97.1 males.

The median income for a household in the city was $48,929, and the median income for a family was $79,044. Males had a median income of $48,542 versus $36,397 for females. The per capita income for the city was $32,484. About 4.6% of families and 11.1% of the population were below the poverty line, including 5.0% of those under age 18 and none of those age 65 or over.

== Education ==
University Heights contains one school. Horn Elementary School is part of the Iowa City Community School District. Students in University Heights attend Northwest Junior High School and West High School.

A small portion of the University of Iowa's Finkbine Golf Course is contained in northwest University Heights.

== Parks and Recreation ==
There are 11.8 and 0.7 acre wooded parcels owned by the city at the very north end of University Heights. The city does not operate any parks.

== Transportation ==
Due to the proximity of the University of Iowa many residents who work or attend classes there walk or ride bicycles or electric scooters. Two Iowa City bus lines traverse University Heights and serve the University and down town Iowa City. During peak hours service is every 15 min. A restaurant and a hotel are adjacent to the University on Melrose Avenue and several businesses including a restaurant and coffee shop are centrally located near Sunset and Melrose avenues. A shopping area with 10 businesses including restaurants, a bank, grocery stores and a drug store are within 0.5 mile on Mormon Trek avenue.

There is a wide sidewalk which runs along the north side of Melrose Avenue.

== Special election ==
In 2009, the developer Jeff Maxwell proposed a large development to be built on the present site of St. Andrew Presbyterian Church. The proposal was considered by the zoning commission and disapproved. It was sent to the city council which also disapproved the proposed rezoning. The 2009 city election reflected the high level of interest in the development as ten candidates ran for the city council and voters turned out in record numbers.

Four of the five council members elected subsequently supported the Maxwell development. One of them, Amy Moore, resigned from the city council and was replaced by Jim Lane by appointment. A petition for a special election obtained more than the minimum signatures. The two candidates in the January 11th election were Jim Lane, the appointed incumbent, and Rosanne Hopson, a longtime resident.

The final turnout of 495 set a record for city elections in University Heights. Hopson received 262 votes (53%) and Lane received 233 (47%).
