= Scott Chandler (American football) =

American football player (born 1985)

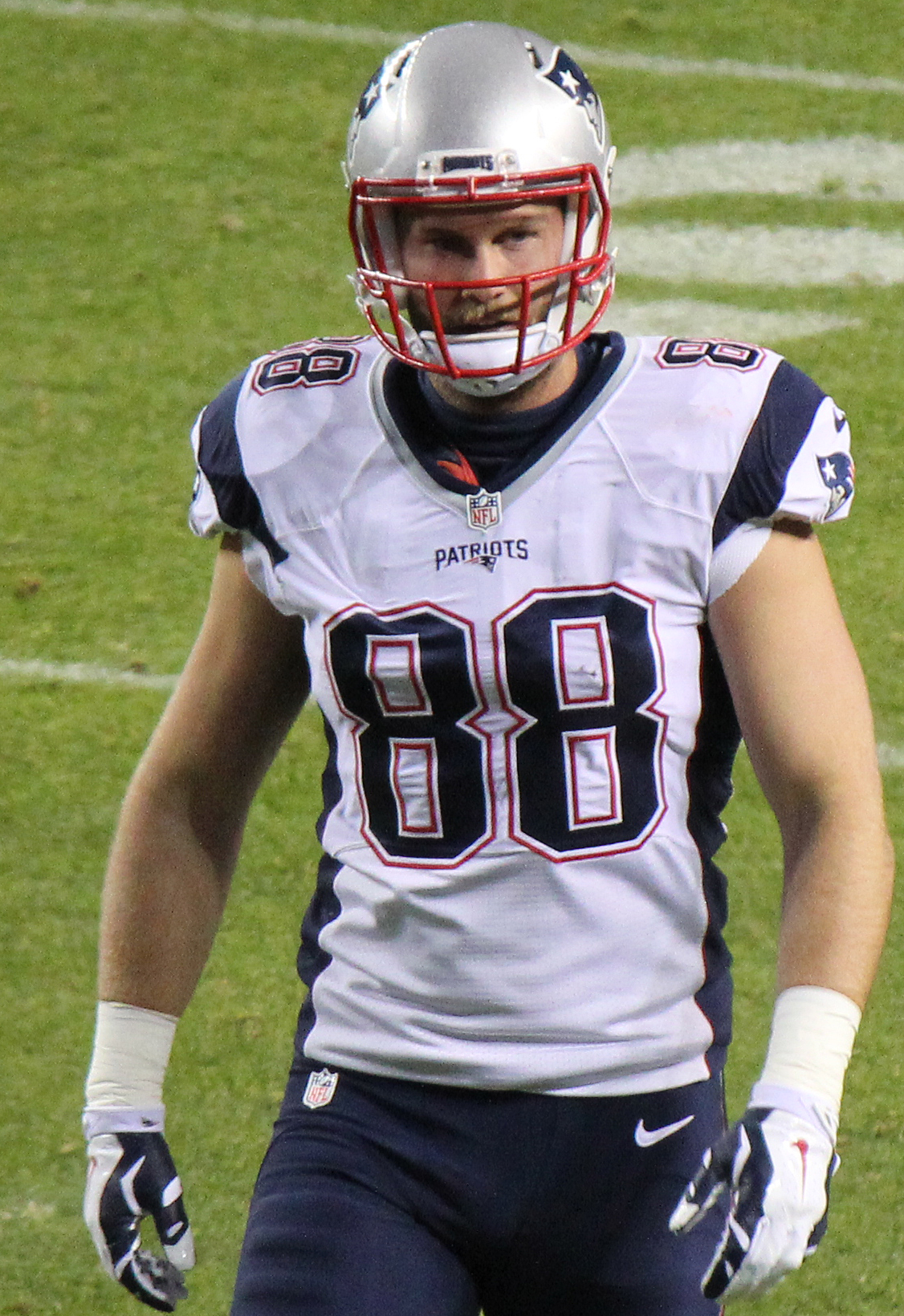
- Chandler with the Patriots in 2015

No. 87, 86, 84, 88
- Position: Tight end

Personal information
- Born: July 23, 1985 (age 41); Bedford, Texas, U.S.
- Listed height: 6 ft 7 in (2.01 m)
- Listed weight: 270 lb (122 kg)

Career information
- High school: Southlake Carroll (Southlake, Texas)
- College: Iowa (2003–2006)
- NFL draft: 2007: 4th round, 129th overall pick

Career history
- San Diego Chargers (2007–2008); Dallas Cowboys (2009)*; New York Giants (2009); Dallas Cowboys (2010)*; Buffalo Bills (2010–2014); New England Patriots (2015)
- * Offseason or practice squad member only

Awards and highlights
- Second-team All-Big Ten (2006)

Career NFL statistics
- Receptions: 205
- Receiving yards: 2,379
- Receiving touchdowns: 21
- Stats at Pro Football Reference

William Scott Chandler (born July 23, 1985) is an American former professional football player who was a tight end in the National Football League (NFL). He played college football for the Iowa Hawkeyes and was selected by the San Diego Chargers in the fourth round of the 2007 NFL draft. He was also a member of the Dallas Cowboys, New York Giants, Buffalo Bills, and New England Patriots. Chandler was the head football coach at Liberty High School in North Liberty, Iowa, near Iowa City. As of 2026, he is an offensive assistant at The University of Iowa.

== Early life ==
Chandler played in high school in Texas at Southlake Carroll. As a senior, he helped his team achieve an undefeated season (16–0 record) and the Class 5A Division II state title. He registered 68 catches for 1,203 yards and 18 touchdowns, while receiving All-district and honorable-mention All-state honors.

== College career ==
Chandler played college football for the Hawkeyes at the University of Iowa from 2004 to 2006. In his first year, he recorded 24 catches for 324 yards and averaged 13.5 yards per catch with two touchdowns. After his sophomore year, his production increased to 47 catches for 552 yards and two touchdowns.

As a junior, he led the team with 47 receptions for 552 yards and 2 touchdowns. In his last season, he posted 46 receptions for 591 yards and 6 touchdowns. He left school ranked second in school history among tight ends with 117 catches for 1,476 yards.

== Professional career ==
=== San Diego Chargers ===
Chandler was selected by the San Diego Chargers in the fourth round (129th overall) of the 2007 NFL draft. As a rookie, he played in only one game and didn't register any statistics. The next year, he was placed on the injured reserve list after hurting his toe in the final preseason game. He was waived on April 27, 2009.

=== Dallas Cowboys (first stint) ===
Chandler signed with the Dallas Cowboys on May 28, 2009. He was waived during final cuts on September 5 and re-signed to the practice squad.

=== New York Giants ===
Chandler was signed off the Dallas Cowboys' practice squad by the New York Giants on December 22, 2009. He was waived on September 4.

=== Dallas Cowboys (second stint) ===
After being waived by New York, Chandler was re-signed to the Cowboys' practice squad. On September 24, he was signed to the Cowboys active roster. He was cut on December 1, to make room for Martin Rucker.

=== Buffalo Bills ===
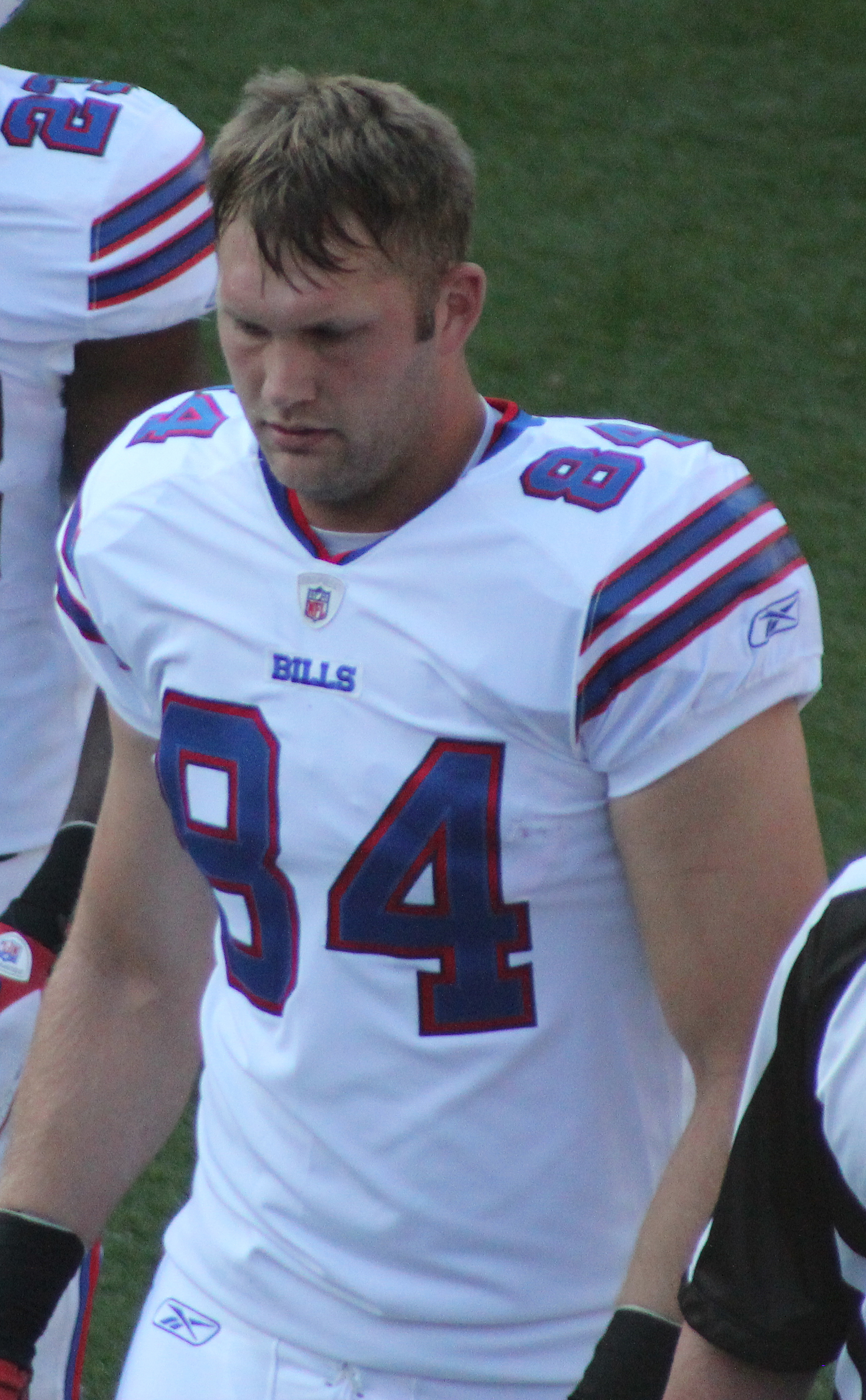
Chandler with the Buffalo Bills in 2011

After being waived by Dallas, Chandler was signed by the Buffalo Bills on December 2, 2010. On September 11, 2011, Chandler made his first career start against the Kansas City Chiefs, recording 5 catches for 63 yards and 2 touchdowns. He appeared in 14 games (9 starts), registering 38 receptions for 389 yards and tying a team record for a tight end with 6 receiving touchdowns in a season (Pete Metzelaars - 1992 and Jay Riemersma - 1998). The next year, he played in 15 games (3 starts), posting 43 receptions for 571 yards and 6 touchdowns. In 2013, he played in 16 games (7 starts), leading the team with 53 receptions and 655 receiving yards.

On March 13, 2014, Chandler signed a two-year contract extension. In 2014, he played 16 games (5 starts), recording 47 receptions for 497 yards and three touchdowns. In the same season, he became the first Bills tight end to surpass 1000 receiving yards since Pete Metzelaars in 1992 and became the fourth tight end in franchise history to reach 150 career receptions.

He was released on March 11, 2015.

=== New England Patriots ===
Chandler signed with the New England Patriots as a free agent on March 13, 2015. He appeared in 15 games (4 starts), posting 23 receptions for 259 yards and 4 touchdowns. He was released by the Patriots on March 2, 2016. Later, it was revealed that the reason for the release was a failed physical stemming from a knee injury suffered early in the season that he played with throughout the year. According to Chandler's Facebook profile, the injury was career ending.

== NFL career statistics ==
Year	Team	Games		Receiving				Fumbles	
Year	Team	GP	GS	Rec	Yards	Avg	TD	Fum	Lost
2007	SD	1	0	0	0	0.0	0	0	0
2009	NYG	0	0	DNP					
2010	SD	9	0	0	0	0.0	0	0	0
2010	BUF	4	1	1	8	8.0	0	0	0
2011	BUF	14	9	38	389	10.2	6	1	1
2012	BUF	15	13	43	571	13.3	6	2	1
2013	BUF	16	7	53	655	12.4	2	1	1
2014	BUF	16	5	47	497	10.6	3	0	0
2015	NE	15	4	23	259	11.3	4	0	0
Career		90	39	205	2,379	11.6	21	4	3

== Personal life ==
Chandler is married to Alissa Chandler, with whom he has four children. His older brother, Nathan, was the starting quarterback for the Iowa Hawkeyes in 2003. He also has two sisters, Caitlin and Deborah, who played college basketball. His brother-in-law, Derek LaFargue, played football for the Oklahoma State Cowboys.
