= Elizabeth Tate Alternative High School =

Public secondary school in Iowa City, Iowa, United States

Location
- 1528 Mall Dr. Iowa City, Iowa 52240
- 41.64°N 91.50°W

Information
- School type: Public Alternative
- Established: 2005
- Superintendent: Matt Degner
- Principal: Ann Browning
- Grades: 9-12
- Enrollment: 192 (2025-2026)
- Student to teacher ratio: 10.68
- Website: tate.iowacityschools.org

Elizabeth Tate Alternative High School (Tate High School) is an alternative high school in Iowa City, Iowa, that is part of the Iowa City Community School District. The school serves grades 9-12, with an enrollment of 164 students in the 2022-23 school year.

== History ==
From 2004–2005, the Iowa City school board planned and built Elizabeth Tate Alternative High School to accommodate students in grades nine through twelve. A $3.4 million building, it includes "natural day lighting for classrooms" and a success center combining a library and study area. It also features "geothermal heating and cooling, an arboretum, gardens and a sculpture patio".

The school is named for Elizabeth (Bettye) Crawford Tate, who was known as a desegregation champion for offering her home to "house American students beginning in 1938, when African Americans were allowed to attend the University of Iowa but not allowed to live in university housing." Iowa City school board president Lauren Reece said, "The way (Elizabeth Tate) combined a sense of rigor with a nurturing spirit exemplifies what the school district's alternative education program is trying to do. Her life contains many lessons of local and Iowa history."

Iowa City's Senior High Alternative Center (for students who were "not doing as well as they should at City High and West High") had been in operation since 1980, and it moved into Tate High School in Fall 2005. According to Sonja Elmquist of the Cedar Rapids Gazette, "The alternative high school program had been housed in a cramped space on the third-floor of the district's administrative office, but is now in its own building near Kirkwood Community College's Iowa City campus. Although starting smaller, the school will have room for 200 students."

== Athletics ==
Tate High School has a basketball and volleyball team. The school does not have any athletic facilities, but it maintains partnerships in the community to provide students with fitness activities.

== See also ==
- List of high schools in Iowa
