= Allie Bates =

American short story writer (born 1957)

- Born: May 1957 (age 69); Memphis, Tennessee, U.S.
- Education: University of Memphis (BA)
- Occupations: Novelist, editor
- Writing career
- Genres: Romance, Science fiction

Allie Bates (born May 1957, in Memphis) is an American short story writer who has also written Romance and Science Fiction novels and screenplays. She is also an English teacher and freelance editor.

== Biography ==
Bates received her BA in creative writing from the University of Memphis, and her master's degree from the University of Memphis College of Education. In the early days of the Internet, she worked in Writer's Ink and Macintosh BBS on GEnie. She has written for Woman's World, Byline Magazine, Marion Zimmer Bradley's Fantasy Magazine, Writers on the River and Softdisk Magazine among others. She has written under the name Allie Bates, Alison Weil, and under pseudonyms; and has ghostwritten books, screenplays, speeches and blogs.

She has won and/or placed in numerous writing competitions, such as the Tupelo Gumtree Festival Short Fiction Competition, NOLA's Novel Beginnings, Deep South Writer's Competition. Bates has edited for New Age Dimensions Publishing, Dark Romance Novel Group, Zumaya Press, as well as for several corporate clients. Her medieval novel Earthchild ISBN 1-59611-016-3 was well received. She worked in development on the movie Florida Road, for director Brad Glass.

== Novelspot ==
She wrote reviews and interviews for Novelspot.net an online magazine, and has written for other review sites. The initial core of Novelspot was made up of Bates, Steve Lazarowitz, and Theresa Rhodes. Novelspot's noteworthy contributors include Mike Resnick, Diana Gabaldon and hundreds of others. In 2007, Novelspot was recognized by Writer's Digest as one of the top 101 sites for writers.

== Work ==
- Dark Romance Anthology: The Abyss (2003) - A collection of eighteen short stories by thirteen diverse authors, including C.T. Adams, Jordan Alexander, Tabitha A. Bradley, Charlotte Boyette‑Compo, Adrianna Dane, Amy Eastlake, Morgan Huxley, Steve Lazarowitz, Brenna Lyons, Terry Pray, Rob Preece, Patricia A. Rasey, and Allie Bates herself.
- Earthchild (2004) - a medieval historical romance novel set in 15th‑century Scotland.
