= Dasia =

Dasia may refer to:

- Dasia (lizard), a genus
- Dasia, a diacritic in Polytonic Greek and Early Cyrillic text denoting rough breathing
- Dasia Taylor (born 2004), American inventor and scientist
