= Liberty High School (Iowa) =

Public secondary school in North Liberty, Iowa, United States

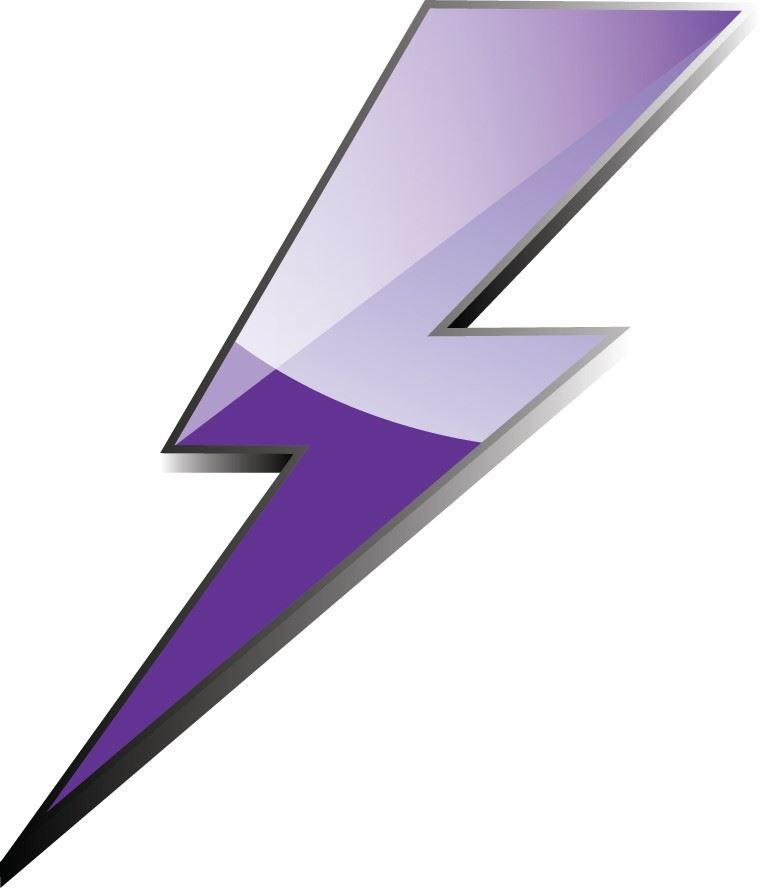
- Liberty High School Logo

Location
- 1400 South Dubuque Street; North Liberty, Iowa 52317; United States; 41.7354°N 91.5691°W

Information
- School type: Public
- Motto: Making a Difference
- Established: 2017
- School district: Iowa City Community School District
- Superintendent: Amy Kortemeyer (interim)
- Principal: Adam Zimmerman
- Teaching staff: 77.19 (FTE)
- Grades: 9–12
- Enrollment: 1,286 (2024–2025)
- Student to teacher ratio: 16.66
- Color
- Fight song: Liberty Fight Song
- Athletics conference: Mississippi Valley Conference
- Mascot: Lightning
- Newspaper: The Live Wire
- Yearbook: The Bolt
- Website: School Website

Liberty High School is a public high school in North Liberty, Iowa, located within the Iowa City Community School District (ICCSD). It opened in August 2017. Liberty is the third comprehensive high school in ICCSD and covers the entirety of North Liberty and northern Coralville.

Liberty is led by Principal Adam Zimmerman.

== Facilities ==
The school building, designed by SVPA Architects, Inc. in 2014, began construction in May 2015. The cost of construction was $75 million.

Liberty High opened to the public on August 12, 2017. The first day of classes began on August 23, 2017.

Liberty High features two gymnasiums, an auditorium, and classroom space for 1,500 students.

Library

The Liberty Lightning Library is comprehensive library that is part of the ICCSD Library Program. The Liberty Library contains upwards of 14,000 items as well as several online databases. The Liberty Library also counts with two collaborative labs, two integrated classrooms and three conference rooms.

== Student body and history ==
The school had 1,286 students enrolled for the 2024–2025 school year.

The Iowa City Community School Board voted in January 2015 to open Liberty High as a comprehensive high school. In May, it was announced that North Central Junior High School would become the feeder school for Liberty High. However, the decision was overturned a year later. North Central later became the feeder school for Liberty High School.

Approximately 700 students, most of whom were slated to attend Iowa City West High School, were enrolled at Liberty High School for the 2017–18 school year.

== Academics & rankings ==
Test Scores:

Average ACT and SAT Scores
	ACT	SAT
Average Composite Score	29	1410

Key Statistics:

Academic Percentages (average)
Graduation Rate	AP Enrollment
87%	23%

11th Grade Percent Proficient in the 2022 Iowa Assessment of Student Progress (ISASP)
	School	District	State
Reading	80.90%	73.57%	70.84%
Math	73.09%	67.22%	64.97%

US News & World Report

- In 2023, U.S. News & World Report ranked Liberty High School as the #1,524 public high school in the United States.
- In 2023, US News & World Report ranked Liberty as the #6 public high school in the State of Iowa.
- In 2023, US News & World Report ranked Liberty as the #2 high school in the Iowa City Community School District.

Niche

- In 2023, Niche (company) ranked Liberty High School as the #20 best public high school in the State of Iowa out of 326 ranked.

== Music ==
Liberty features ensembles in orchestra, choir, and band.

Choir is co-directed by Robert Williams and Judy Duncan and is divided into 4 curricular choirs:

- Treble-Clef Choir, all soprano and alto choir, non-auditioned.
- Bass-Clef Choir, all tenor and bass choir, non-auditioned.
- Bella Voce, all soprano and alto choir, auditioned.
- Liberty Singers, mixed-voice choir, auditioned.

Band is co-directed by Ryan Arp and Nick Carlo and divided into 3 curricular bands:

- Concert Band, non-auditioned band.
- Symphony Band, auditioned band.
- Wind Ensemble, auditioned band.

Orchestra is directed by Johanna Kennedy and is divided into 2 Orchestras.

- Symphonic Orchestra, non-auditioned.
- Philharmonic Orchestra, auditioned.

== Athletics ==
The school mascot, the Lightning, was announced in November 2014. Athletic teams bearing the moniker began practice in December 2015 competing at the freshman level with students that would be moving to Liberty from West High. Full membership in the Mississippi Valley Conference was granted in the 2018–2019 school year, when Liberty began fielding a varsity football team. During the inaugural year, Liberty had varsity programs in volleyball, girls’ and boys’ cross country, boys’ golf (fall), girls’ and boys’ basketball, wrestling, girls’ and boys’ soccer, girls’ and boys’ track and field, girls’ golf (spring), baseball and softball competing as an independent while football was only offered at the freshman and sophomore levels. Scott Chandler, a former tight end at the University of Iowa and National Football League, joined the Liberty football staff as an offensive coordinator before being promoted to head coach in 2024. In Chandler’s first year at the helm, the Lightning reached the Iowa Class 5A semifinals, falling to eventual champion Southeast Polk, 38-35.

- In 2022, the Liberty Volleyball Team brought home their first state title in school history.
- 2023 Boys' Soccer Class 3A State Champions

== See also ==
- List of high schools in Iowa
