= SADB =

SADB may refer to:

- StopXam (English:Stop A DoucheBag) a Russian non-profit organization
- Sadhbh (name)
- Sadhbh, the Sidhe mother of Oisin
- Sadb ingen Chuinn, an Irish queen
- A Security Association Database, used in IPsec
