= Dan DeBono =

American novelist

- Born: Daniel DeBono; November 13, 1964 (age 61); Detroit, Michigan, U.S.
- Education: Wayne State University
- Occupations: Writer; novelist

Daniel DeBono (born November 13, 1964, in Detroit, Michigan) is an American writer and novelist.

== Early life ==
Daniel DeBono grew up in Chesterfield, Michigan. He graduated from L'anse Creuse High School North and attended Wayne State University in Detroit, Michigan from 1982 to 1986.

== Career ==
From 1992 to 1995, DeBono wrote more than 200 travel features for The Citrus County Chronicle. He also wrote travel features for Scuba News. DeBono uses Gareth Blackmore as his nom de plume for some of his science fiction, horror, fantasy and comic writing. The name was first used in 1992 for the magazine Gareth Blackmore's Unusual Tales Following that, DeBono/Gareth Blackmore's stories were illustrated in Factual Illusions, a comic published by Alliance Comics and illustrated by comic artists Kyle Hotz and Armando Gil. DeBono also wrote sci-fi, horror and fantasy stories for other publications, including Vision, Midnight Zoo, and Enchanted Worlds. DeBono's Blackmore Publishing had its own periodical entitled Enchanted Worlds as well.

DeBono created & published Indy – The Independent Comic Guide from 1993 to 1996. An interview and original art publication with contributions from many influential alternative comics creators. Publisher (and attorney) Jeff Mason took the publication over and "went digital", which morphed into the Alternative Comics publisher. It is still published online. Indy is included in Michigan State University's Library Collection.

From 1996 to 2001, DeBono mainly wrote non-fiction articles. He wrote over 1,000 investment-education features for a variety of banks and investment firms, including Chase, Charles Schwab, Travelers, Merrill Lynch, Farmers, and USAA.

DeBono wrote a novel entitled The One Who Would Be King under the Blackmore name (ISBN 0-9728902-1-1) in 2003. DeBono created the Yahoo Group Worlds Of Fantasy in 2003. The group published a collection of short stories into a trade paperback called Worlds Of Fantasy. The published authors were chosen by the group and the ratings on www.fantasyreaders.com.

DeBono created the Website FantasyReaders in 2002. Authors can promote their science fiction, fantasy and horror stories. Short stories and novel excerpts are posted on the site and readers can read and rate. DeBono's latest novel was released in December, 2011 Double Dragon Publishing entitled, A Book Of The Lands: The Goblin Invasion. Three short stories appeared in Zharmae Publishing Press's Ends Of Man Anthology, published May, 2012.
