= Gail Z. Martin =

American writer

- Martin at Dragon Con in 2026
- Born: December 1, 1962 (age 63); Meadville, Pennsylvania, U.S.
- Education: Grove City College (BA); Pennsylvania State University (MBA)
- Occupation: Writer
- Writing career
- Pen name: Gail Z. Martin
- Period: 2007–present
- Genres: Urban fantasy, epic fantasy
- Website: ascendantkingdoms.com

Gail Zehner Martin (born December 1, 1962) is an American writer of epic fantasy and urban fantasy and is most well known for her The Chronicles of The Necromancer fantasy adventure series for Solaris Books and Double Dragon Publishing.

== Biography ==
Martin was born in Meadville, Pennsylvania, and she received her BA in history from Grove City College in 1984, and an M.B.A. in Marketing and Management Information Systems from Pennsylvania State University in 1986. She worked for seventeen years as a VP of Corporate Communications and other marketing roles before founding DreamSpinner Communications in 2003.

Her first novel, The Summoner, was published in 2007, and she has been a prolific author ever since. In addition to her fiction writing, Martin writes feature articles for regional and national magazines and teaches public relations writing and public speaking for the University of North Carolina - Charlotte. In 2018, Martin started publishing romance under the pen name Morgan Brice.

Her first story was about a vampire, which she wrote at age five. She also enjoyed watching Dark Shadows and Lost in Space in preschool. In college, she started a fanzine and is a regular attendee of science fiction/fantasy conventions, Renaissance fairs, and living history sites.

She married Larry N. Martin in 1987 and has three children.

== Awards and reception ==
=== Ascendant Kingdoms Saga ===
SF Signal felt that Ice Forged "Starts out with the swagger of a disaster/post-apocalyptic/fantasy hybrid but undergoes an unappealing change of course at the 2/3 mark and ends with a whimper," while a Publishers Weekly review felt it suffered from an "inflated dialogue-to-action ratio."

Publishers Weekly said that the extensive cast of characters and detailed action in War of Shadows were "...both strengths and weaknesses." They further said: "Colorful descriptions of vivid battle and magic scenes, complete with terrifying fantastic creatures, and complex familial and political relationships will reward the motivated reader, but when characters speculate on the actions of their adversaries it slows an already unwieldy story."

=== The Chronicles of the Necromancer ===
In Fantasy Magazine's review of Dark Haven, Richard Dansky explored the novel's world-building versus character development, saying "Fans of world-building will probably find it lightweight, while fans of characters will be much more engaged."

=== Fallen Kings Cycle ===
A Publishers Weekly review called found book one, The Sworn, "fun and accessible, if hardly groundbreaking...There's little plotwise that will surprise fantasy veterans, but it's a solidly told story and very friendly to new readers." However, it found The Dread, "Ambitious in scope and meticulous in detail, this adventure has no shortage of intrigue and action. Unfortunately, it’s bogged down by a sizable cast, myriad plot lines, and a slow start."

"A few loose threads leave the impression that this is the first of many adventures for Cassidy and her team, and a refreshing lack of interpersonal and sexual drama will appeal to longtime fans of paranormal mysteries."—Publishers Weekly on Deadly Curiosities http://www.publishersweekly.com/978-1-78108-233-1

== Bibliography ==
=== Ascendant Kingdoms Saga (published by Orbit Books) ===
1. Ice Forged. January 2013.
2. Reign of Ash. April 2014.
3. War of Shadows. April 2015.
4. Shadow and Flame. March 2016.

=== Ascendant Kingdoms Saga (Short Stories) ===
1. No Reprieve. December 2015.

=== Assassins of Landria (published by Ethan Ellenberg Literary Agency) ===
1. Assassin's Honor. October 2018.
2. Sellsword's Oath. January 2020.
3. Fugitive's Vow. December 2020.

=== Blaine McFadden Adventures (Short Stories & Novellas) ===
1. Arctic Prison: King's Convicts. October 2015.
2. Ice Bound: Kings Convicts II. December 2015.
3. Cold Fury: Kings Convicts III. December 2015.
4. King's Exiles. July 2019.

=== The Chronicles of the Necromancer (published by Solaris) ===
1. The Summoner. January 2007.
2. The Blood King. January 2008.
3. Dark Haven. January 2009.
4. Dark Lady's Chosen. January 2010.

=== Darkhurst (published by Solaris) ===
1. Scourge. July 2017.
2. Vengeance. July 2018.

=== Deadly Curiosities Novels (published by Solaris) ===
1. Deadly Curiosities. June 2014.
2. Vendetta. January 2016.
3. Tangled Web. May 2018.
4. Inheritance. October 2019.

=== Deadly Curiosities Adventures (Short Stories) ===
1. Vanities. February 2013.
2. Wild Hunt. July 2013.
3. Dark Legacy. July 2013.
4. Steer a Pale Course. February 2013.
5. Among The Shoals Forever. October 2013.
6. The Low Road. November 2013.
7. Buttons. December 2013.
8. Coffin Box. May 2014.
9. Wicked Dreams. June 2014.
10. Collector. July 2014.
11. Bad Memories. September 2014.
12. Shadow Garden. July 2015.
13. The Restless Dead. August 2015
14. Retribution. September 2015.
15. Spook House. October 2015
16. Fatal Invitation. November 2015
17. Redcap. December 2015.
18. The Final Death. April 2016.
19. Bloodlines. August 2016.
20. Predator. October 2016.
21. Fair Game. December 2016.
22. Unraveled. September 2017.

=== Fallen Kings Cycle (published by Orbit Books) ===
1. The Sworn. January 2011.
2. The Dread. February 2012.

=== Joe Mack (Novellas) (published by Falstaff Books) ===
1. Cauldron. July 2019.
2. Black Sun. April 2020.

=== The Jonmarc Vahanian Adventures (Short Stories) ===
1. Raider's Curse. February 2013.
2. Caves Of The Dead. March 2013.
3. Storm Surge. May 2013.
4. Bounty Hunter. June 2013.
5. Blood's Cost. July 2013.
6. Stormgard. September 2013.
7. Monstrosities. January 2014.
8. Bad Places. February 2014.
9. Dead Man's Bet. March 2014.
10. Dark Passage. April 2014.
11. Bad Blood. September 2014.
12. Haunts. November 2014.
13. Cursed. December 2014.
14. Death Plot. December 2014.
15. Brigands. February 2015.
16. Bleak Harvest. March 2015.
17. Hard Choices. March 2015.
18. Dead Reckoning. April 2015.
19. Desperate Flight. May 2015.
20. Deathmatch. January 2017.
21. Guardian. February 2017.
22. Smuggler. April 2017.

=== Spells, Salt, & Steel (Novellas) (published by Falstaff Books) ===
1. Spells, Salt, & Steel. July 2017.
2. Open Season. February 2018.
3. Double Trouble. June 2018.
4. Close Encounters. September 2018.
5. Night Moves. August 2019.
6. Monster Mash. March 2020.
7. Creature Feature. October 2020.

=== Storm and Fury Adventures (Short Stories) (co-written with Larry N. Martin) ===
1. Resurrection Day. July 2015.
2. Grave Voices. January 2016.
3. Airship Down. February 2016.
4. Rouge. March 2016.
5. Ghost Wolf. April 2017.
6. Lagniappe. May 2017.
7. Ruin Creek. June 2017.
8. The Hunt. September 2017.

=== Wasteland Marshals (Novellas) (published by Falstaff Books) ===
1. Wasteland Marshals. July 2019.
2. Witch of the Woods. February 2020.
3. Ghosts of the Past. July 2020.

=== Stand-alone titles ===
- Iron and Blood. July 2015.
- Sons of Darkness: A Night Vigil Novel. November 2018.

=== Non-fiction ===
- The Thrifty Author's Guide to Launching Your book Without Losing Your Mind. April 2010.
- 30 Days To Social Media Success : The 30 Day Results Guide to Making the Most of Twitter, Blogging, Linkedin, and Facebook. Career Press. October 2010. ISBN 9781601631305.
- Thrifty Author: Social Media and Mobile Apps for Authors. Comfort Publishing. August 2012. ISBN 9781936695959.
