= Geoff Nelder =

British freelance editor and author

- Born: Hannover, Germany
- Occupations: Writer, editor
- Writing career
- Period: 1990s-present
- Genres: Science fiction, Fantasy, Thriller
- Website: geoffnelder.com

Geoff Nelder is a British freelance editor and author. He has written both fiction and non-fiction, and his research in the field of air pollution and climate won him a fellowship with the Royal Meteorological Society. Nelder's fictional work falls in the genres of science fiction, fantasy and thrillers, and he is known for his sci-fi series ARIA, which won him a Preditors & Editors Award for best science fiction novel. Nelder also published the sci-fi magazine Escape Velocity, which launched in 2009. Prior to moving to writing as his primary occupation, Nelder has worked as a teacher at Queens Park High School for 26 years.

In 1975 Nelder became a life member of the British Vegan Society. In 2009 Nelder became a publisher for BeWrite Books, an independent publisher.

== Awards ==
- Fellow of the Royal Meteorological Society, Master of Science (Sheffield), Bachelor of Education
- Preditors & Editors Award for best science fiction novel (ARIA: Left Luggage) (2013, won)

== Bibliography ==
=== ARIA ===
- Left Luggage (2012, LL-Publications, ISBN 978-1905091959)
- Returning Left Luggage (2013, LL-Publications, ISBN 978-0957472655)
- Abandoned Luggage (TBA)

=== Fiction ===
- Escaping Reality (2005, Brambling Books, ISBN 978-0954956325)
- Dimensions, a sci-fi anthology with Robert Blevins (2006, Adventure Books of Seattle)
- Exit, Pursued by a Bee (2008, Double Dragon Publishing, ISBN 978-1554045945) now published in ebook only as Alien Exit
- Hot Air (2011, Adventure Books of Seattle)
- Escape Velocity - The Anthology, anthology with Robert Blevins (2011, Adventure Books of Seattle)
- ARIA Trilogy - Left Luggage; Returning Left Luggage; Abandoned Left Luggage (2012 - 2015, LL-Publishing)
- The Chaos of Mokii (2016, Solstice Publishing)
- Xaghra's Revenge (2018, Solstice Publishing) revised as Vengeance Island
- Incremental a collection of 25 surreal, mostly scifi short stories (2018, LL-Publishing)
- Suppose We first in the Flying Crooked scifi series. Vegan protagonist on a vegan planet (2019, LL-Publishing)
- Falling Up, Kepler's Son and Vanished Earth continue the Flying Crooked scifi series.

=== Non-fiction ===
- Huddersfield's Changing Climate (1977)
- Chester's Climate: past and present (1987) Republished with updates (2017)
- Cheshire from Space remote sensing pack (1992, as project manager with Keith Hilton)
- Inside Scoop (2008)
- How to Win Short Story Competitions Second edition (2018) co-written with Dave Haslett ISBN 978-1719861663
