= Iowa City Community School District =

Public school district in Iowa City, Iowa, United States

Location
- Iowa City, Iowa Johnson County
- Coordinates: 41.679169, -91.509581

District information
- Type: Public
- Grades: PK-12
- Superintendent: Matt Degner
- Schools: 28
- Budget: $236,987,000 (2020-21)
- NCES District ID: 1931680

Students and staff
- Students: 14,805 (2022-23)
- Teachers: 1081.15 FTE
- Staff: 1302.63 FTE
- Student–teacher ratio: 13.69
- Athletic conference: Mississippi Valley Conference

Other information
- Cities served: Iowa City, Coralville, North Liberty, Hills, and University Heights, Iowa
- Website: www.iowacityschools.org

Iowa City Community School District (ICCSD) is the public school district that serves the Iowa City, Iowa area. Over 14,000 students in kindergarten through 12th grade attend 21 elementary schools, three middle schools, three comprehensive high schools, and one alternative school for ninth through twelfth graders. The district covers 130 square miles (340 km^{2}) and serves the communities of Iowa City, Coralville, Hills, North Liberty, University Heights and the surrounding rural areas. The school district employs over 2,200 people. It is the fifth largest school district in the state of Iowa and the second largest employer in the Iowa City area.

== Historic schools ==
- Henry Sabin Elementary School in Iowa City, Iowa was located at 509 South Dubuque Street. The building housed an alternative high school, but was originally known as the First Ward School. The school was named for the Iowa educator Henry Sabin. The school closed as an elementary school circa 1979. It was known throughout the 1970s for its alternative teaching methods, including open classrooms and discussions about drug abuse and sexuality. Above the kindergarten level, classes were paired—first and second grade, third and fourth grade, and fifth and sixth grade. Ana Mendieta, an art teacher at the school for a few years in the mid-1970s, would achieve some renown as an artist. The building was torn down in 2015.

== List of schools ==
=== Elementary schools ===
- Alexander Elementary
- Borlaug Elementary
- Coralville Central Elementary
- Garner Elementary
- Grant Elementary
- Hills Elementary
- Hoover Elementary
- Horn Elementary
- Kirkwood Elementary
- Lemme Elementary
- Lincoln Elementary
- Longfellow Elementary
- Lucas Elementary
- Mann Elementary
- Penn Elementary
- Shimek Elementary
- Twain Elementary
- Van Allen Elementary
- Weber Elementary
- Wickham Elementary
- Grant Wood Elementary

=== Middle Schools ===
- North Central Middle School
- Northwest Middle School
- South East Middle School

=== High schools ===
- City High
- West High
- Liberty High School

=== Alternative school ===
- Elizabeth Tate Alternative High School

== Enrollment ==
View source data.

== See also ==
- List of school districts in Iowa
