= North Liberty, Iowa =

- City
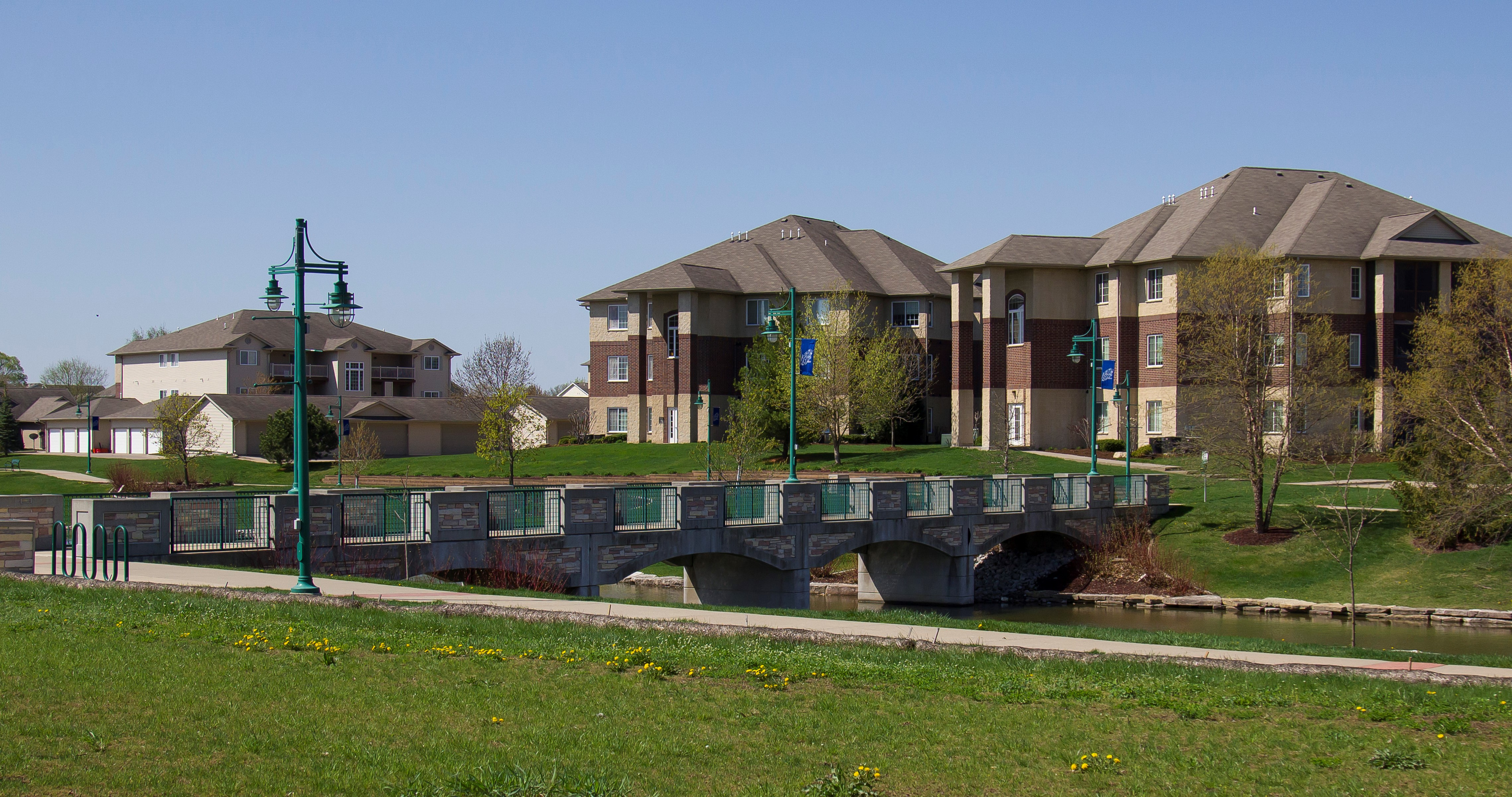
- Liberty Centre Pond at Liberty Centre in North Liberty

- Seal

- Location of North Liberty, Iowa
- Coordinates: 41°44′38″N 91°36′28″W
- Country: United States
- State: Iowa
- County: Johnson
- Incorporated: November 10, 1913

Government
  - Type: Council-manager government

Area
  - Total: 9.12 sq mi (23.62 km^{2})
  - Land: 9.12 sq mi (23.62 km^{2})
  - Water: 0 sq mi (0.00 km^{2})
- Elevation: 778 ft (237 m)

Population (2020)
  - Total: 20,479
  - Density: 2,245.2/sq mi (866.88/km^{2})
- Time zone: UTC-6 (Central (CST))
  - Summer (DST): UTC-5 (CDT)
- ZIP code: 52317
- Area code: 319
- FIPS code: 19-57360
- GNIS feature ID: 2395256
- Website: northlibertyiowa.gov

North Liberty is a city in Johnson County, Iowa, United States. It is a suburb of Iowa City and part of the Iowa City Metropolitan Statistical Area. As of the 2020 census, the city population was 20,479. From 2000 to 2010, North Liberty was the second fastest-growing city in Iowa. A 2017 LendEDU poll named North Liberty the ninth most educated city in the United States and the most educated city in the Midwest.

== History ==
The North Liberty area was first settled in 1838 by John Gaylor and Alonzo C. Dennison. It was originally known as "Big Bottom" or "North Bend" (in reference to its location near the bend of the Iowa River) by its earliest settlers and was later known as "Squash Bend" before the city was platted as North Liberty in 1857.

North Liberty incorporated on November 10, 1913, at which time its population was approximately 190. Population growth accelerated in the 1960s, and the Iowa City Community School District opened Penn Elementary there in 1961. A 1967 special census placed the city's population at 782, and by 1980 the population had grown to over 2,000. In 1984, in response to the population growth, the North Liberty Community Library was founded, and Penn Meadows Park, the city's largest, was opened. By 2000, the population of the city was over 5,000. The city had established its own police and fire departments and built a community center with library and aquatic park, as well as a city administration building. The city has since continued to grow, with a population of 7,224 in a 2004 special census. In 2007, the population was estimated to be 10,982, making North Liberty the second fastest-growing city in Iowa. According to the 2010 U.S. census the population of North Liberty had increased to 13,374.

== Geography ==
According to the United States Census Bureau, the city has a total area of 7.83 square miles (20.28 km^{2}), all land.

North Liberty is located on the Iowan erosion surface. Drivers on I-380 experience an abrupt transition from the muted topography of the Iowan surface to the rolling hills of the Southern Iowa drift plain, four miles south of North Liberty.

== Demographics ==
Historical populations
Year	Pop.	±%
1920	171	—
1930	161	−5.8%
1940	282	+75.2%
1950	309	+9.6%
1960	334	+8.1%
1970	1,055	+215.9%
1980	2,046	+93.9%
1990	2,926	+43.0%
2000	5,367	+83.4%
2010	13,374	+149.2%
2020	20,479	+53.1%
Source: U.S. Decennial Census

=== 2020 census ===
As of the 2020 census, North Liberty had a population of 20,479 and 7,897 households, of which 5,036 were families, with a population density of 2,245.2 inhabitants per square mile (866.9/km^{2}).

There were 8,192 housing units at an average density of 898.1 per square mile (346.8/km^{2}); 3.6% were vacant, the homeowner vacancy rate was 1.5%, and the rental vacancy rate was 4.2%.

99.1% of residents lived in urban areas, while 0.9% lived in rural areas.

Of all households, 39.7% had children under the age of 18 living in them; 49.1% were married-couple households; 10.2% were cohabitating couples; 24.9% had a female householder with no spouse or partner present; 15.9% had a male householder with no spouse or partner present; and 36.2% were non-families. About 25.6% of all households were made up of individuals, and 5.4% had someone living alone who was 65 years of age or older.

The median age was 31.7 years; 29.0% of residents were under the age of 18, 30.9% were under age 20, 5.9% were between the ages of 20 and 24, 37.5% were from 25 to 44, 17.8% were from 45 to 64, and 7.9% were 65 years of age or older. The gender makeup of the city was 48.7% male and 51.3% female, with 95.0 males for every 100 females and 89.7 males for every 100 females age 18 and over.

Racial composition as of the 2020 census
Race	Number	Percent
White	16,616	81.1%
Black or African American	1,324	6.5%
American Indian and Alaska Native	38	0.2%
Asian	615	3.0%
Native Hawaiian and Other Pacific Islander	13	0.1%
Some other race	427	2.1%
Two or more races	1,446	7.1%
Hispanic or Latino (of any race)	1,221	6.0%

=== 2010 census ===
As of the census of 2010, there were 13,374 people, 5,492 households, and 3,262 families living in the city. The population density was 1,708.0 inhabitants per square mile (659.5/km^{2}). There were 5,761 housing units at an average density of 735.8 per square mile (284.1/km^{2}). The racial makeup of the city was 90.2% White, 4.5% African American, 0.2% Native American, 1.8% Asian, 0.9% from other races, and 2.3% from two or more races. Hispanic or Latino of any race were 3.5% of the population.

There were 5,492 households, of which 37.0% had children under the age of 18 living with them, 46.4% were married couples living together, 9.7% had a female householder with no husband present, 3.3% had a male householder with no wife present, and 40.6% were non-families. 27.6% of all households were made up of individuals, and 3% had someone living alone who was 65 years of age or older. The average household size was 2.44 and the average family size was 3.08.

The median age in the city was 29.2 years. 28.1% of residents were under the age of 18; 9% were between the ages of 18 and 24; 44% were from 25 to 44; 15.3% were from 45 to 64; and 3.5% were 65 years of age or older. The gender makeup of the city was 49.0% male and 51.0% female.

=== 2000 census ===
As of the census of 2000, there were 5,367 people, 2,259 households, and 1,400 families living in the city. The population density was 791.9 inhabitants per square mile (305.8/km^{2}). There were 2,377 housing units at an average density of 350.7 per square mile (135.4/km^{2}). The racial makeup of the city was 95.38% White, 1.53% African American, 0.17% Native American, 0.82% Asian, 0.11% Pacific Islander, 0.78% from other races, and 1.21% from two or more races. Hispanic or Latino of any race were 2.38% of the population.

There were 2,259 households, out of which 35.4% had children under the age of 18 living with them, 48.6% were married couples living together, 9.6% had a female householder with no husband present, and 38.0% were non-families. 27.6% of all households were made up of individuals, and 3.7% had someone living alone who was 65 years of age or older. The average household size was 2.38 and the average family size was 2.95.

26.8% are under the age of 18, 11.5% from 18 to 24, 43.9% from 25 to 44, 13.8% from 45 to 64, and 4.1% who were 65 years of age or older. The median age was 29 years. For every 100 females, there were 98.0 males. For every 100 females age 18 and over, there were 96.2 males.

== Government ==
North Liberty is governed by a five member city council and a non-voting mayor, each serving a four-year term.

Position	Name	Term Expires
Mayor	Chris Hoffman	2029
Councilor 1	Tonja Fortney	2029
Councilor 2	Brian Wayson	2029
Councilor 3	Brian Leibold	2027
Councilor 4	Brent Smith	2027
Councilor 5	Paul Park	2027

== Education ==
A majority of North Liberty residents live within the boundaries of the Iowa City Community School District, while the area west of Jones Boulevard (and the Deerfield Subdivision) belongs to the Clear Creek–Amana Community School District.

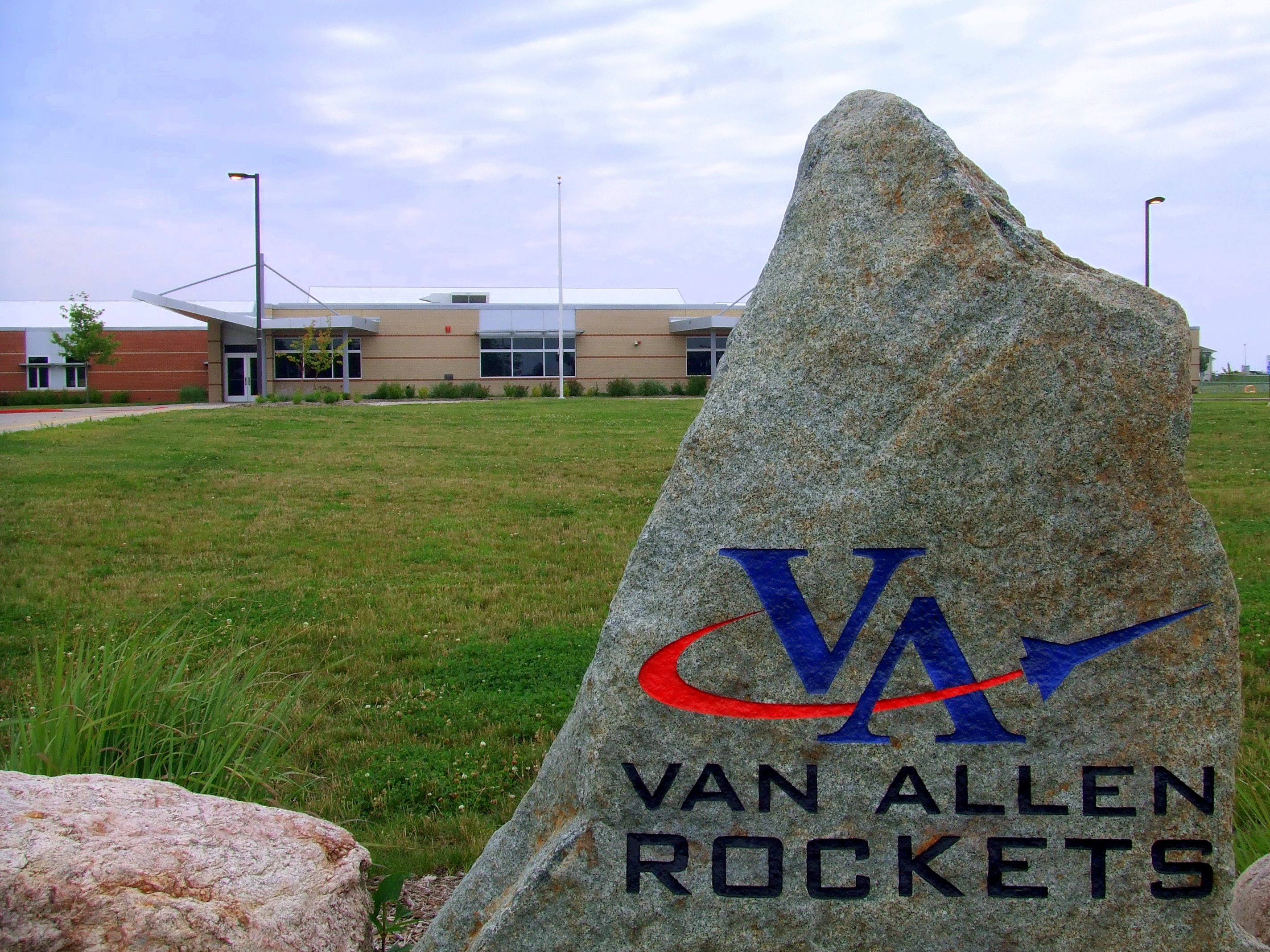
James Van Allen Elementary

Public schools in or serving students from North Liberty include the following:

- From the Iowa City Community School District:
  - Buford Garner Elementary
  - Penn Elementary
  - Van Allen Elementary
  - Christine Grant Elementary
  - North Central Junior High
  - Liberty High (North Liberty)
  - West High (Iowa City)
- From the Clear Creek–Amana Community School District:
  - North Bend Elementary
  - Clear Creek–Amana Middle School (Tiffin)
  - Clear Creek Amana High School (Tiffin)
  - Oak Hill Elementary (Tiffin)

A water tower in North Liberty

A 2017 poll by LendEDU gave North Liberty an Education Grade of 84.51, placing it 9th among its Top 500 Most Educated Cities. North Liberty is the only non-coastal city listed in the top 10. According to the study, the number of advanced-degree holding residents has a strong correlation with several social goods, including "a good number of high paying jobs in the area, an excellent schooling system to educate the next generation, nearby higher education institutions, and more."

== Transportation ==
The city adjacent to interstate highway 380 connecting Iowa City to Waterloo, Iowa.

A commuter bus route connects North Liberty and Iowa City on weekdays. The Campus Connect bus runs on weekdays, connecting Cedar Rapids to North Liberty four times a day. The East Central Iowa Council of Governments (ECICOG) operates a fully-accessible bus service.

Paved bicycle trails extend to Coralville, Iowa in the south and Coralville Reservoir to the north.

== Infrastructure ==
The sewage from the city is treated at a sewage treatment plant using Membrane Bio-Reactor (MBR) technology followed by UV sterilization. It is designed to be able to discharge more than 2 million gallons of effluent to Muddy Creek each day.

== VLBA node ==
The radio telescope located northeast of North Liberty (41°46′17.13″N 91°34′26.88″W; designation "NL") on Mehaffey Bridge Road is one of ten dishes comprising the Very Long Baseline Array (VLBA).

== Notable person ==
- Jean Prahm, Olympic bobsledder
