= Simon Drake (writer) =

Australian writer

Simon Drake (born 1975) is an Australian writer of science fiction and non-fiction.

== Biography ==
Simon Drake was born in Brisbane, Australia. In 1998 he lived in Sydney, and then in 2003 moved to live in Berlin, Germany. In 2004 he moved to London and wrote "The Art of Office War". Double Dragon Publishing released his first science fiction novel "Love Data", followed by "10,000BC - The First Geniuses". In response to the financial crisis, and during the height of the international bailout process, he wrote "The Bankers Who Sold the World", which was published in 2009. Simon Drake currently lives in Frankfurt am Main, Germany.

== List of major works ==
- The Art of Office War, 2006
- Love Data, 2007
- 10,000BC - The First Geniuses, 2008
- Generous Enemies, 2008
- The Return of the Last Space Explorer, 2008
- The Bankers Who Sold the World, 2009
