= Sadhbh (name) =

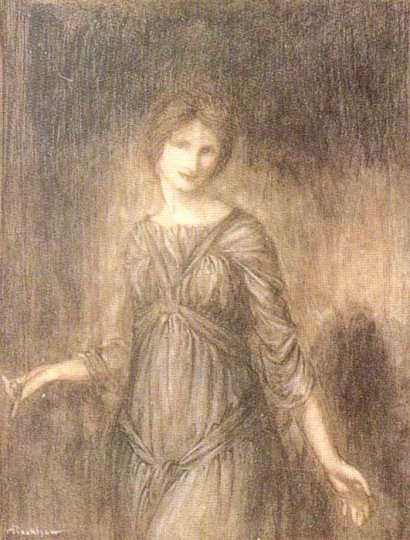
- Illustration of Sadb by Arthur Rackham, 1910
- Pronunciation: English: /saɪv/ SYVE; Connacht Irish: ['sˠaːw] Munster Irish: ['sˠəivˠ] Ulster Irish: ['sˠaːwə]
- Gender: Female

Origin
- Origin: Proto-Celtic *sŭādŭā
- Meaning: Sweet-lovely
- Region of origin: Ireland, Irish diaspora

Other names
- Related names: Saidhbhín (diminutive)

Sadhbh (Old Irish: Sadb, anglicised Sive) is an Irish feminine personal name. Derived from Proto-Celtic *swādwā '(the) sweet and lovely (lady)', the name is cognate with the initial elements in the attested Gallic names Suadu-gena and Suadu-rix and with Sanskrit svādú-, Ancient Greek ἡδύσ (hēdýs), Latin suāvis (compare Suada), Tocharian B swāre and Modern English sweet.

The town Cahersiveen in County Kerry roughly translates to 'The Fortress of Little Sadhbh'.

The Whiteboys, a secret agrarian organisation in 18th century Ireland, referred to themselves as "Queen Sive Oultagh's children" ("Sive" or "Sieve Oultagh" being anglicised from the Irish Sadhbh Amhaltach, or Ghostly Sally). This likely stemmed from the tradition of personifying Ireland as a woman and its people as her children, and was used alongside other women's names as intimidating pseudonyms on Whiteboy letters.

== Notable people ==
- Sadhbh McGrath
- Sadhbh Nic Donnchadh, daughter of Donnchadh, King of Ossory and wife of Ard-Rí Donnachadh mac Flann Sionna; patroness of Saighir
- Sadhbh O'Sullivan, member of the band The Isohels
- "Sadhbh Trinseach", name adopted by Irish nationalist artist Cesca Chenevix Trench
- Sadhbh Bean Uí Mailchonaire

=== In fiction ===
- In Irish mythology, Sadhbh (or Saba) was the mother of Oisín by Fionn mac Cumhail
- Sadb ingen Chuinn was a daughter of Conn of the Hundred Battles, a High King of Ireland
- Sive, a 1959 play by John B. Keane and also the name of its lead character
- Traditional Irish sean-nós song, Sadhbh Ní Bhruinneallaigh

== See also ==
- List of Irish-language given names
- Sabin (disambiguation)
