= Edwin L. Sabin =

American author (1870–1952)

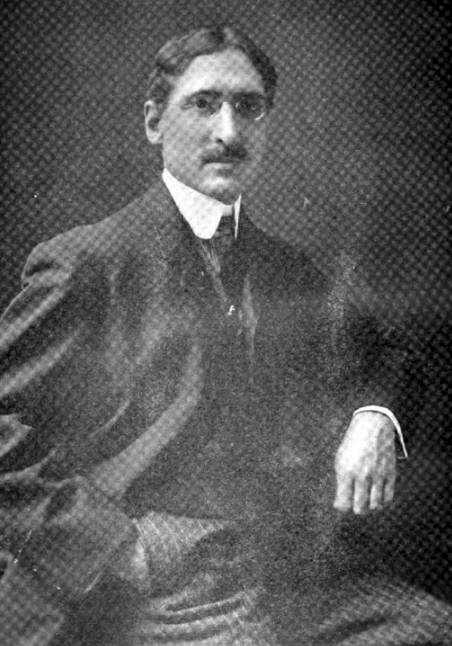
Edwin L. Sabin in 1906

Edwin Legrand Sabin (December 23, 1870 – November 24, 1952) was an American author, primarily of boys' adventure stories, mostly set in the American West.

== Biography ==
Sabin was born in Rockford, Illinois to Henry Sabin and Esther Frances Hotchkiss Sabin, but grew up in Clinton, Iowa, where his father became superintendent of schools when Sabin was less than a year old. Sabin's brother was the author Elbridge Hosmer Sabin. Sabin graduated from Clinton High School in 1888. He attended the University of Iowa until his senior year in 1892, when he left to begin his career as a newspaper reporter. He returned to graduate with Phi Beta Kappa honors in 1900. At the University of Iowa he was a member of Beta Theta Pi and the school's first rugby team.

Sabin worked for a number of newspapers in Iowa and Illinois: the Daily Herald in Clinton, the Des Moines Daily News, the Daily State Register, and the Daily Capital in Des Moines, Iowa, the Morning Democrat in Davenport, Iowa, the Peoria Herald, the Peoria Transcript, and the Peoria Journal in Peoria, Illinois, and Campbell's Weekly in Chicago, Illinois. In May 1893, as a correspondent he accompanied a scientific expedition led by University of Iowa zoology professor Charles Cleveland Nutting on the schooner Emily E. Johnson. The 83-day expedition to the Bahamas stopped at Egg Island, Havana, Bird Key, the Dry Tortugas, and Spanish Wells. It gathered 15,000 specimens, providing material for decades of exhibitions and research.

In October 1896, he married Mary Caroline Nash of Iowa, nine years younger than him, whom he met working in Chicago.

Sabin began writing poetry and short stories for popular publications, including The Chautauquan, St. Nicholas, Country Life, Everybody's Magazine, McBride's Magazine, The Saturday Evening Post, Outing Magazine, Outdoor Recreation, The Sewanee Review, Blue Book, The Cavalier, All-Story Cavalier Weekly, and Weird Tales. His first book, The Magic Mashie and Other Goldfish Stories (1902), was a collection of stories about golf, a game that was new to the United States. It included "The Supersensitive Golf-Ball", a story about a golf ball which reacts to the emotions of players. His second book was The Beaufort Chums (1905). Both books were unsuccessful, but the second began a long, fruitful relationship with the publisher Thomas Y. Crowell Co.

From 1913 to 1931 he published dozens of critically acclaimed adventure books about the American West, many of them for Crowell's "Great West" and "Range and Trail" series or for the "Trail Blazers" series from J. B. Lippincott & Co. Though aimed at an audience of boys, Sabin conducted copious research, even visiting institutions like the Bancroft Library and state historical societies and conducting interviews with people who had interacted with historical figures like Calamity Jane and George Armstrong Custer. He moved west to be closer to the geography of his works, first to Denver, Colorado, then San Diego, California, finally settling in La Jolla, California.

Sabin's most notable book is Kit Carson Days, the first seriously researched biography of the frontiersman Kit Carson. It was published as one volume in 1914 and a two-volume, revised edition was published in 1935. Though widely praised by critics and considered a standard work on the subject, given the amount of time he devoted to the project it was a net financial loss for Sabin.

The Great Depression spelled the end of Sabin's success as an author. He continued to be published sporadically, but royalties dwindled and his manuscripts began to be brusquely rejected by publishers. An attempt at establishing a correspondence school for novice writers failed. Financial circumstances forced the Sabins to move inland to Hemet, California. In 1952, he died a few months after his wife, a ward of Riverside County, California.
