= Henry Sabin =

American educator (1829–1918)

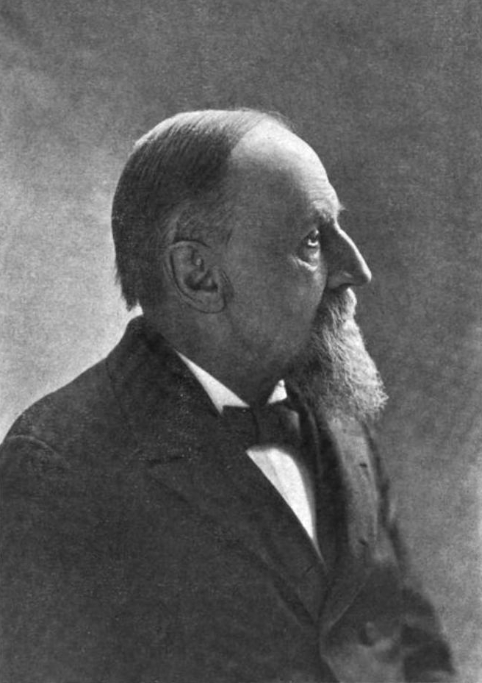
- Born: October 23, 1829; Pomfret, Connecticut
- Died: March 22, 1918 (aged 88); Chula Vista, California
- Education: Amherst College
- Occupation: Educator
- Political party: Republican
- Children: Edwin L. Sabin

Signature
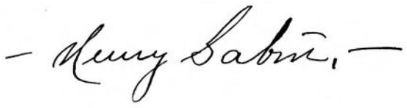

Henry Sabin (October 23, 1829 – March 22, 1918) was an Iowa educator.

== Biography ==
Henry Sabin was born in Pomfret, Connecticut on October 23, 1829. He entered Amherst College and graduated in 1852. He was a superintendent of public schools and a member of the State Teachers' Association. As a Republican nominee, he served as the State Superintendent of Public Instruction from 1887 to 1892, and again from 1893 until his retirement in 1898.

He was the father of writer Edwin L. Sabin.

He died at his home in Chula Vista, California on March 22, 1918.

== Schools named for Henry Sabin ==
At least two schools have been named for Henry Sabin:

- Henry Sabin Elementary, Clinton, Iowa
- Henry Sabin Elementary, Iowa City, Iowa
