= E. Rose Sabin =

American novelist

Elenora Rose Sabin
- Occupation: Writer
- Writing career
- Language: English
- Genres: Fantasy, science fiction
- Notable awards: Andre Norton Gryphon Award for best unpublished manuscript by a new woman fantasy writer in 1992

Elenora Rose Sabin (E. Rose Sabin) (January 15, 1936 – July 22, 2025) was an author of fantasy and science fiction novels for adults and young adults, the most notable being A School for Sorcery, which is set in an invented world in a country called Arucadi. In 1992, the novel in manuscript form won the Andre Norton Gryphon Award for the best unpublished manuscript by a new woman fantasy writer. Her other works include A Perilous Power, the prequel to A School for Sorcery, and When the Beast Ravens, the sequel to A School for Sorcery, all published in hardcover as Tor Books and in trade paperback as Starscape Books by Tom Doherty Associates, LLC. An adult science fiction novel titled Shadow of a Demon is published in ebook format and as a trade paperback by Double Dragon Publishing.

== Bibliography ==
- A School for Sorcery (2002) ISBN 0-7653-0289-6
- A Perilous Power (2004) ISBN 0-7653-0859-2
- When the Beast Ravens (2005) ISBN 0-7653-0858-4
- Shadow of a Demon (2011) ISBN 978-1-55404-845-8

== Reviews ==
Publishers Weekly wrote of A School for Sorcery, "The story has its charms, but it's so easy to follow and predict that the plot twists don't and the surprise ending isn't." RT Book Review wrote of A Perilous Power, "A touch of romance and a hint of terror make this a well-rounded, entertaining tale for all ages." Analog Science Fiction and Fact wrote of When the Beast Ravens, "It’s much darker than Potter, but it’s still a nice allegory of adolescence. Parents be warned, though: The darkness makes this one less suitable for kids and more suitable for teens."
