= Dasia Taylor =

American inventor (born 2004)

- Born: April 6, 2004 (age 22); Chicago, Illinois
- Education: University of Iowa
- Occupations: Inventor, scientist
- Known for: Founder and CEO of VariegateHealth

Dasia Taylor (born April 6, 2004) is an inventor, scientist and CEO known for her invention of medical sutures that indicate infection with surgical wounds.

== Early life and education ==
Dasia Taylor was born on April 6, 2004 in Chicago, Illinois. Her family relocated to Madison, Indiana and later on Iowa City, Iowa. She graduated from Iowa City West High School in 2021. Taylor attended weekly school board and district meetings as a student to advocate for an anti-racist curriculum. Taylor is enrolled and attends the University of Iowa.

== Career ==
In October 2019, Taylor invented medical sutures that change color to indicate a wound infection as part of a science fair. During the development of the project, she discovered that many sutures are coated with an electrically conductive material with a resistance which changes with the condition of the wound. This information is then sent to a patient or doctor's device to warn them of an infection. Taylor had to create and test out several dyes and suture threads before discovering beet dye and cotton-polyster blend threads worked best for her invention. Her sutures were also created with the aim to be cost-effective and accessible. In 2021, Taylor was named a finalist in the Regeneron Science Talent Search, and received the Seaborg Award.

She is the founder and CEO of VariegateHealth, a medical device company. Taylor cites research linking a higher infection rate for Black people post-surgeries, where signs of infection "like redness of the skin and swelling don’t appear as easily on darker skin tones". Taylor hopes to bring her invention to low and middle-income countries where it could better benefit mortality from common infections.

== Awards and honors ==
- In 2023, Taylor was named Iowa's Woman of the Year by USA Today.
- In 2023, Taylor was included on Black Enterprise's 40 under 40 list for "Tech & STEM" achievements
