= Sabin (given name) =

Sabin is a given name of the following people

- Sabin of Bulgaria, ruler of Bulgaria from 765 to 766
- Sabin Bălașa (1932–2008), Romanian painter
- Sabin Berthelot (1794–1880), French naturalist and ethnologist
- Sabin Bornei (born 1975), Romanian boxer
- Sabin Carr (1904–1983), American pole vaulter
- Sabin Chaushev (born 1971), Bulgarian Olympic shooter
- Sabin W. Colton (1847–1925), American investor
- Sabin Cutaș (1968–), Romanian politician
- Sabin Drăgoi (1894–1968), Romanian composer
- Sabin-Cosmin Goia (born 1982), Romanian football defender
- Sabin Howard, American classical figurative sculptor
- Sabin Ilie (born 1975), Romanian football striker
- Sabin Manuilă (1894–1964), Romanian statistician
- Sabin Merino (born 1992), Spanish professional footballer
- Sabin Rai (born 1974), Nepali singer and lyricist
- Sabin Strătilă (born 1995), Romanian rugby union full-back
- Sabin Willett (born 1957), American lawyer and novelist

== See also ==
- Sabine (given name)
