= Steve Lazarowitz =

American novelist

Steve Lazarowitz. (1962, New York, United States) is a writer. of Fantasy and Speculative Fiction. His fantasy serial Alaric Swifthand first appeared in Dragon's Claw Ezine (1997.) Music to My Ears was selected for The Best of the Hood Special Edition (anthology.) In 2000, "A Creative Edge: Tales of Speculation" won the Anthology category in the 2000 Dream Realm Awards. "Reflections of a Recovering Servant" was released by Twilight times books in 2002. "Dream Sequence and other Tales from Beyond", was published by Double Dragon Publishing. In 2003, he resides in Hobart Tasmania with his wife and son and current menagerie.
