= The Isohels =

Irish rock band

- Origin: Naas, County Kildare, Ireland
- Genres: Alternative Rock
- Years active: 2004–2008
- Members: Claire Nicole Prendergast, Sadhbh O'Sullivan, Sal Healy, Gill Prenderville, Eamonn Hoban
- Past members: Gavin Elsted, Brian Farrell
- Website: www.myspace.com/theisohels

The Isohels were an Irish five piece alternative rock band from Naas, Ireland, formed in 2004 by Claire Nicole Prendergast and Sadhbh O'Sullivan. A short time after the band began to take shape with the addition of Sal Healy on keys and Gill Prenderville on guitar.

The band released their first single "Better" in November 2005 which saw them get the attention of various industry folk and music lovers both in their native Ireland and overseas.

In June 2008, their debut album Kooramock was released, but the launch was to be their last live show.

== Biography ==
The band began in 2004 with Claire Nicole Prendergast (vocals & bass) and Sadhbh O'Sullivan (lead guitar). Sal Healy (keyboard) and Gill Prenderville (guitar) joined in early 2005. They played their first show at the Béaltaine Festival 2005 Newbridge Ireland. Drummers Gavin Elsted and Brian Farrel played with the band.

In November 2005 they recorded their first EP in Elekra Studios, Dublin. The three track release included the single "Better", "Out of love", and "Behind you". "Better" was named "Single of the Week" by Road Records, Dublin. It was also in line for use with the promotion of the Nokia N91 as a download as well as achieving air play on various radio stations; Kfm, Phantom fm, Kooba Radio.

They spent the most part of 2005 and 2006 working on their live show by playing in music venues and busking in Dublin. Eamonn Hoban became drummer for the band in January 2007. Around the same time, they headlined the first of a series of gigs held in the Dara Cinema Naas.

Meanwhile, their original material was developing and in September 2007, they started to record their music in Sonic Eye Studios, Dublin with producers Rob McLeoud and Ruth Kennington. The ten tracks recorded were mastered by Barry Woodward and the band released Kooramock, their debut album. The album was successfully launched in June 2008 in Whelan's, Dublin, which was also to be their last show. The band had split due to two of the members moving abroad.

== Follow up ==
Member Sadhbh O'Sullivan went on to release her debut album We Are Moving under the alias Sive in 2012. "'We Are Moving' is an album that reveals itself gradually, full of innovation and attention to detail, and what's going on underneath the vocals is always interesting." "Her stand-out instrument is her voice, which sweeps along displaying folk and jazz nuances with the confidence of one who knows."

Claire Nicole Prendergast since duetted on worldwide MAP-represented track; "Back Disco" from Band on an Island's The Sound Sweep and well received Knoxville Morning track "Baseball Song".

In 2013, both Sadhbh O'Sullivan and Claire Nicole Prendergast appeared on the first track; "Brasserie" of Sundernix's eponymous debut album.

In October 2013, Claire Nicole joined forces with musician Peadar Kearney to form Lyttet. Their first release "Forever Those Days" was described as "softly glowing atmospheric" music and crept into the Top 10 Electronic Irish Music Charts in iTunes Ireland.

== Discography ==
=== Albums ===
- Kooramock (2008)

=== Singles, EPs ===
- Better (2005)
