= Franklin eBookMan =

Ebook handheld reading device

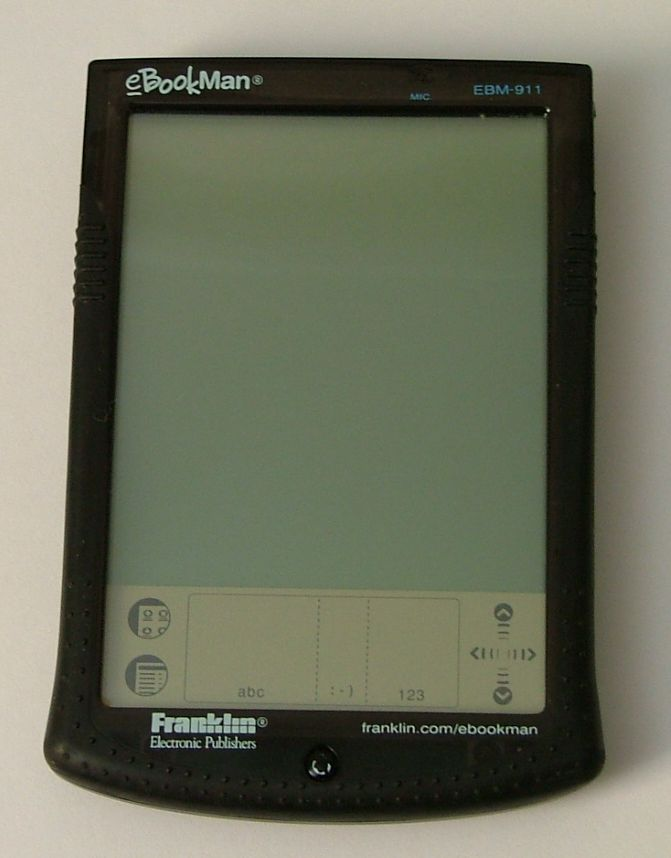
Franklin eBookMan EBM-911

The Franklin eBookMan is a discontinued handheld device made to read ebooks. This gadget, made from 1999 until 2002, has standard PDA functions and can play and record sounds. It has a black on green touchscreen, contains 8 or 16 MB of RAM, and uses its own proprietary operating system. Its handwriting recognition system accepts nearly natural handwriting.

Three models of eBookman were produced: the 900 (8 Mb memory - no backlight), the 901 (8 Mb memory - backlight) and the 911 (16 Mb memory - backlight). All come with an MMC (not SD-compatible for the 8Mb model, but properly compatible with the 16Mb models.) slot which allows for memory expansion. The eBookMan can read contacts and appointments from Microsoft Outlook; synchronization with a Windows PC is done through a USB cable.

Early eBookMan units lost all information stored on them when the batteries were changed. Franklin acknowledged the problem, and replaced all defective units at no charge. Its digital rights management system is tied directly to the hardware, which resulted in an immediate problem for marketing: it was not possible to try the device in-store since it wouldn't work until the user connected it to an Internet-linked PC and downloaded their own registered version of the OS. Support was provided via a home page at Franklin, now removed, which when development ceased in 2002 was still describing the device as 'new'.

Although research and development on the eBookMan ceased in 2002, new eBookMans continued to be available from Ectaco. As of April 30, 2011, all support and downloads for eBookMan were discontinued.

There is an active user base. Some users have written programs for the eBookMan. Many games were developed and a free version of the Mobipocket reader was developed for the eBookMan to take the place of the underpowered Franklin reader which came with the device.

== See also ==
- List of e-book readers
