= ISilo =

iSilo is a document reader available for Palm OS, Pocket PC, Windows Mobile Smartphone, Symbian UIQ, Symbian S60, and Windows CE Handheld PC handhelds, Windows computers as well as Apple iPhone, Android, Windows Phone 7 and HP webOS smartphones. iSilo has direct support for reading these document types: iSilo 4.x, iSilo 3.x, iSilo 2.x, Palm Doc, and plain text files (.txt). However it has largely fallen out of use due to its one-way nature — documents can be converted to iSilo format, but not back out for editing. Other formats, such as EPUB, use open standards, are easily edited or converted, and achieve similar compression rates.

== iSiloX ==
iSiloX is a desktop application that converts web and file content to the iSilo document format. It is made by DC & Co company. Supported file formats include HTML, CSS, text, Palm Doc, JPEG, GIF, BMP, and PNG. The X in the name iSiloX represents the "transformation" of content functionality provided by iSiloX. iSiloXC, on the other hand, stands for the command-line version of iSiloX, with the C denoting the command-line capability.

In 2005 a book recommended the usage of this program for medical practitioners.

== See also ==
- Palm OS
