= Iowa City West High School =

Public secondary school in Iowa City, Iowa, United States

Location
- 2901 Melrose Avenue; Iowa City, Iowa 52246; United States; 41°39′16″N 91°34′54″W

Information
- Type: Public
- Motto: "Where Excellence is a Tradition"
- Established: 1968
- School district: Iowa City Community School District
- Principal: Mitch Gross
- Teaching staff: 94.59 (FTE)
- Grades: 9–12
- Enrollment: 1,472 (2023–2024)
- Student to teacher ratio: 15.56
- Colors: Forest Green and Gold
- Mascot: Trojans/Women of Troy
- Newspaper: The West Side Story
- Yearbook: The Trojan Epic
- Website: West website

Iowa City West High School is a public high school in Iowa City, Iowa. It serves grades 9–12 for the Iowa City Community School District.

== Athletics ==
The Trojans compete in the Mississippi Valley Conference in the following sports:

- Cross country
  - Boys' 1988 Class 3A State Champions
  - Girls' 5-time State Champions (1997, 1998, 2000, 2001, 2004)
- Girls' volleyball
  - 2-time Class 4A State Champions (2010, 2011) (see the film The Miracle Season)
- Football
  - 3-time Class 4A State Champions (1995, 1998, 1999)
- Basketball
  - Boys' 7-time State Champions (1977, 1998, 2000, 2012, 2013, 2014, 2017)
  - Girls' 2012 and 2018 Class 5A State Champions
- Wrestling
  - 2-time Class 3A State Champions (2006, 2007)
- Swimming
  - Boys' 4-time State Champions (2014, 2015, 2020,2026)
- Track and field
  - Boys' 2-time Class 4A State Champions (2007, 2012)
  - Girls' 6-time State Champions (2000, 2001, 2006, 2007, 2008, 2010)
- Golf
  - 2010 Class 2A Coed State Champions
- Soccer
  - Boys' 9-time State Champions (2000, 2003, 2005, 2009, 2010, 2012, 2013, 2014, 2017)
  - Girls' 2-time State Champions (2004, 2015)
- Softball
- Baseball
- Tennis
  - Boys' 11-time Class 2A State Champions (1995, 2005, 2006, 2012, 2013, 2014, 2016, 2017, 2019,2022, 2023)
  - Girls' 4-time Class 2A State Champions (2004, 2005, 2006, 2018)
- Bowling

== Notable alumni ==
- Dan Perkins (1979), syndicated author of the award-winning satirical comic strip This Modern World.
- Laura Leighton (1986) starred on Fox's Melrose Place, a supporting character in ABC Family's Pretty Little Liars
- Amy Nielsen (1995), politician
- Nate Kaeding (2000), retired NFL placekicker for the San Diego Chargers, was selected to two Pro Bowl games
- Frances Haugen (2002), engineer and Facebook whistleblower
- Bridget Kearney (2003), Lake Street Dive bassist
- Ali Farokhmanesh (2006), former professional basketball player and current college coach
- Zach Wahls (2009), LGBT activist, author, and Iowa Senator from the 37th District.
- George Kittle (2012), current NFL tight-end for the San Francisco 49ers. He had been selected to 4 pro bowls as of 2023.^{[21]}
- Diego Lasansky (2012), painter and printmaker
- Jeremy Morgan (2013), basketball player for Hapoel Jerusalem in the Israeli Basketball Premier League.
- Patrick McCaffery (2019), basketball player
- Dasia Taylor (2021), inventor, scientist and CEO

== Notable staff ==
- Edwin K. Barker (1928–2019), principal

== See also ==
- The Miracle Season - 2018 film about the school's participation in the State Girls Volleyball Championship of 2011.
- List of high schools in Iowa
- Category:Iowa City West High School alumni
